= Timeline of RTÉ Radio =

This is a timeline of RTÉ Radio.

== 1920s ==
- 1925 – Test broadcasts of 2RN begin.
- 1926 – 1 January 2RN commences broadcasting.
- 1927 – Station 6CK is established in Cork.

== 1930s ==
- 1932 – The Athlone transmitter broadcasts a high power 60KW signal.
- 1933 – 2RN is renamed as Radio Athlone
- 1938 – Radio Athlone becomes Radio Éireann.

== 1940s ==
- 1948 – Radio Éireann broadcasts on shortwave from Athlone.

== 1950s ==
- 1953 – The Athlone transmitter's power is increased to 100 KW.

== 1960s ==
- 1960
  - The Broadcasting Authority Act 1960 establishes a statutory corporation called Radio Éireann. This change comes ahead of the launch of a television service the following year.
- 1961 to 1965
  - No events.
- 1966
  - Radio Éireann is renamed as Radio Telefís Éireann
  - VHF/FM broadcasts commence.
- 1967
  - No events.
- 1968
  - No events.
- 1969
  - 6 June – Building work commences on a new Radio Centre at Donnybrook.

== 1970s ==
- 1970
  - No events.
- 1971
  - April - Completion of building work on the new Radio Centre at Donnybrook.
- 1972
  - 2 April – At 3pm, RTÉ Raidió na Gaeltachta is launched.
- 1973
  - September - Start of live broadcasts from the new Radio Centre at Donnybrook.
- 1974
  - 2 March – RTÉ Cork Local Radio is established as an opt-out service which operated for a limited number of hours per week, relaying the national service (RTÉ Radio 1) at other times. The service was popular but had its hands tied by the limited number of local hours it could output.
- 1975
  - A new transmitter at Tullamore replaces Athlone.
- 1976
  - 8 November - Last broadcast from GPO Henry Street studios.
- 1977
  - No events.
- 1978
  - No events.
- 1979
  - 31 May – Radio 2 launches.

== 1980s ==
- 1980
  - No events.
- 1981
  - No events.
- 1982
  - RTÉ broadcasts Radio 2 on 1278 kHz in Dublin and in Cork.
- 1983
  - No events.
- 1984
  - 5 November – Breakfast news programme Morning Ireland launches on Radio 1.
  - 6 November – Classical music service RTÉ FM3 commences, sharing its frequency with Raidió na Gaeltachta FM3 broadcast on the RTÉ Raidió na Gaeltachta network at breakfast time, lunchtime and in the evenings.
- 1985
  - No events.
- 1986
  - August – RTÉ announces that it is to use its allocated longwave frequency for a new pop music station and RTÉ teams up with RTL Group / Radio Luxembourg to form Radio Tara to launch the venture, the trading name of what will become Atlantic 252 the following year.
- 1987
  - RTÉ commences building a giant 3-sided 248-metre broadcast mast in Clarkstown, County Meath to broadcast the new long wave station and sets up studios in the nearby town of Trim.
- 1988
  - RTÉ begins rolling out radical changes to Radio 2's format, which sees the ending on the station of most non-pop music programming. This sees the station being rebranded as "2FM".
  - RTÉ operates a temporary station, Millennium 88FM, to mark the year of the Dublin Millennium.
- 1989
  - April – Millennium 88FM closes down.
  - 1 September – At 8am, Atlantic 252 launches. The station broadcasts between 6am and 7pm, outside of which listeners were invited to tune to Radio Luxembourg.
  - RTÉ Cork Local Radio is rebranded as Cork 89FM.

== 1990s ==
- 1990
  - August – Atlantic 252 starts broadcasting in the evening and is now on air from 6 am until 2 am.
- 1991
  - September – Atlantic 252 commences 24-hour transmission.
- 1992
  - No events.
- 1993
  - No events.
- 1994
  - Cork 89FM is relaunched as RTÉ Radio Cork.
- 1995
  - No events.
- 1996
  - No events.
- 1997
  - No events.
- 1998
  - In late 1998 under the direction of David Dunne, Atlantic 252, in response to dropping audiences, relaunches with a format of indie and dance music which includes 30 hours of 'specialist' music shows.
- 1999
  - 1 May – RTÉ launches an additional national FM transmitter network and uses it to separate FM3 from Radio na Gaeltachta, and expand its remit to include other types of minority music.
  - RTÉ FM3 becomes RTÉ Lyric FM and expands its remit to include other types of minority music. The resulting station was Lyric FM (currently styled RTÉ lyric fm). It also moved from Dublin to Limerick as part of a policy of regionalisation.

== 2000s ==
- 2000
  - 2FM is renamed RTÉ 2fm.
  - RTÉ Radio Cork closes due to low listening figures.
  - February – Atlantic 252 is relaunched as "The New Atlantic 252". The format is changed to urban contemporary music (such as garage, house, hip hop and R&B) and the station is rebranded with the slogan "Non-stop Rhythm and Dance".
- 2001
  - 1 October – RTÉ Raidió na Gaeltachta begins 24-hour broadcasting.
- 2002
  - 2 January – After more than 12 years on air, Atlantic 252 closes.
- 2003
  - Radio 2 on 1278 kHz closes.
  - 31 December – RTÉ Radio stops broadcasting on shortwave, concentrating on satellite transmission and relay via the World Radio Network
- 2004
  - January – Radio 1 begins broadcasting on long wave from the Clarkstown transmitter which was previously used to broadcast Atlantic 252.
  - RTÉ closes 2FM on medium wave (612 kHz).
- 2005
  - 2 May – Songs with English lyrics are played on RTÉ Raidió na Gaeltachta for the first time in a new slot broadcast between 21:00 and 01:00, called Anocht FM (Tonight FM).
- 2006
  - 1 January – The RTÉ DAB Multiplex launches.
- 2007
  - 30 May – RTÉ Gold, RTÉ Digital Radio News and alternative music station RTÉ 2XM launch.
  - October RTÉ Choice on a trial basis and around the same time, RTÉ Digital Radio Sport launches.
- 2008
  - 24 March – At 3pm, Radio 1 stops broadcasting on medium wave.
  - March – RTÉ Chill launches.
  - April – Dance and electronic music station RTÉ Pulse launches and RTÉ Digital Radio Sport closes.
  - 1 May – RTÉ Jr Radio launches.
  - 30 November – RTÉ Digital Radio News closes.
  - 1 December – RTÉ Choice launches as a permanent station.
- 2009
  - RTÉ begins daily shortwave radio broadcasts to Irish in Africa between 19.30 and 20.30 UTC on 6220 kHz via WRN

== 2010s ==
- 2010
  - 29 October – Saorview is launched, making RTÉ's digital radio channels available via Digital Terrestrial Television.
- 2011
  - No events.
- 2012
  - 3 May – Saorsat is launched, bringing RTÉ Digital TV and Radio services to areas not reached by Saorview or DAB.
- 2013
  - May – RTÉ Choice and RTÉ Radio 1 Extra merge.
- 2014
  - 24 September – RTÉ announced that broadcasting of RTÉ Radio 1 on 252 kHz would cease on 27 October 2014. Following representations from Irish listeners in the UK and others that date has now been postponed until 2017, later extended until at least June 2019.
- 2015
  - No events.
- 2016
  - No events.
- 2017
  - No events.
- 2018
  - No events.
- 2019
  - 7 November – As part of cost-cutting measures, RTÉ announces plans to close all of its DAB digital radio services, including RTÉ Gold, RTÉjr and RTÉ Radio 1 Extra. The proposals state that the stations will close in April 2020.

== 2020s ==
- 2020
  - No events.
- 2021
  - 31 March – RTÉ ceases transmission of its radio services on Digital Audio Broadcast (DAB) after a report commissioned by the broadcaster found that just 0.5% of adults in Ireland listen to radio via DAB while 77% of adults in Ireland listen on FM. Its digital stations, which survived a closure plan in 2019, remain on air via Saorview, cable and online streaming,
- 2022
  - No events.
- 2023
  - 15 April – At 12.03am, RTE Radio 1 ends broadcasting on long wave. A looped broadcast of the station tuning signal and an information message on other methods of listening to the station was broadcast until 11am on 18 April 2023.
  - 18 April – Kevin Bakhurst, former director of the UK's media watchdog Ofcom, is appointed as the new Director-General of RTÉ, replacing Dee Forbes, and will take up the position from July.
  - 27 September – The transmitter mast which had broadcast RTE Radio's long wave output is demolished.
