= TV channels and radio stations of RTÉ =

This is a list of national, regional and local television and radio stations owned by the Raidió Teilifís Éireann in Ireland.

== List of television stations ==
=== National ===
- RTÉ One - Flagship channel showing news, current affairs, factual, drama, entertainment, and movies.
  - RTÉ One HD
  - RTÉ One +1
- RTÉ2 - A range of programming including movies and sport.
  - RTÉ2 HD
  - RTÉ2 +1
- RTÉjr - Focuses on children's programming.
- RTÉ News - Rolling news and current affairs.

=== Proposed ===
- RTÉ Ireland
- RTÉ Three

==== Proposed Closures ====
- RTÉ ONE +1
- RTÉ2 +1

== List of national radio stations ==
=== FM ===
- RTÉ Radio 1 - Speech and music
- RTÉ 2FM - Contemporary hit radio
- RTÉ Raidió na Gaeltachta - Irish-language speech and music
- RTÉ Lyric FM - Classical / specialist music

=== Saorview, Cable and online platforms only ===
- RTÉ 2XM - Alternative music
- RTÉ Junior - Children's (daytime 7.00–21.00)
- RTÉ Chill - Relaxation (overnight 21.00–7.00)
- RTÉ Gold - Nostalgia and oldies
- RTÉ Pulse - Electronic music
- RTÉ Radio 1 Extra - Intelligent speech

==== Proposed Closures ====
- RTÉ 2XM - Alternative music
- RTÉ Junior - Children's (daytime 7.00–21.00)
- RTÉ Chill - Relaxation (overnight 21.00–7.00)
- RTÉ Pulse - Electronic music
- RTÉ Radio 1 Extra - Intelligent speech

== List of former stations ==
=== Television ===
- Tara Television

=== Radio ===
- Atlantic 252
- Millennium 88FM
- RTÉ Digital Radio News
- RTÉ Digital Radio Sport
- RTÉ Choice
