= RTÉ Radio =

Radio division of Irish broadcaster, Raidió Teilifís Éireann

- Type: Division of Raidió Teilifís Éireann
- Industry: Media
- Founded: 1 January 1926
- Headquarters: RTÉ Radio Centre, Donnybrook, Dublin, Ireland
- Area served: Republic of Ireland; Northern Ireland
- Services: Radio broadcasting
- Owner: Government of Ireland
- Parent: Raidió Teilifís Éireann
- Website: www.rte.ie/radio

RTÉ Radio is a division and service of Irish public broadcaster Raidió Teilifís Éireann (RTÉ), which broadcasts four analogue channels and one digital channels across Ireland.

Beginning on 1 January 1926 as 2RN, it was the new Irish Free State's broadcasting service. In 1932 a 60-kw transmitter was set up in Athlone to cover a major event - the 1932 Eucharistic Congress. In 1933 the service became Radio Athlone (Irish Raidió Áth Luain) and in 1938 was renamed as Radio Éireann. After launching a television service in 1961 (Telefís Éireann), it became Raidió Teilifís Éireann, or RTÉ in 1966.

Similar to its parent company, RTÉ Radio is a statutory body, overseen by a board appointed by the Government of Ireland, with general management in the hands of a committee of senior managers, currently an interim leadership team, headed by the Director-General. It is regulated by Coimisiún na Meán, and is mostly financed through the radio license fee, while some funds come through advertising.

== Channels and availability ==
Station	Genre	FM	AM	Saorview DTT	Saorsat	Virgin Cable	Sky	Freesat	Internet radio
RTÉ Radio 1	Speech and music	87.8–90.2 MHz	No	200	200	901	0131	750	m3u8
RTÉ 2FM	Contemporary hit radio	90.4–92.2 MHz	No	202	202	902	0132	751	m3u8
RTÉ Raidió na Gaeltachta	Irish-language speech and music	92.6–94.4 MHz	No	204	204	905	0134	753	m3u8
RTÉ Lyric FM	Classical/specialist music	95.2–99.6 MHz	No	203	203	903	0133	752	m3u8
RTÉ Gold	Nostalgia	No	No	208	208		No	No	m3u8

Defunct

The following stations were closed on 31 December 2025.

Station	Genre	FM	AM	Saorview DTT	Saorsat	Virgin Cable	Sky	Freesat	Internet radio
RTÉ 2XM	Alternative music	No	No	206	206	944	No	No	m3u8
RTÉ Chill	Relaxation (overnight, 21.00–7.00)	No	No	209	209	942	No	No	m3u8
RTÉ Junior	Children's (daytime, 7.00–21.00)	No	No	209	209	942	No	No	m3u8
RTÉ Pulse	Electronic music	No	No	205	205	943	No	No	m3u8
RTÉ Radio 1 Extra	Intelligent speech	No	No	201	201	941	No	No	m3u8

== History ==
The first voice broadcast of 2RN, the original radio callsign for what would eventually become RTÉ Radio 1, took place on 14 November 1925 when Seamus Clandillon, the station director, announced on air: "Seo Raidió 2RN, Baile Átha Cliath ag tástáil", Irish for "This is Radio 2RN, Dublin calling" (or "Dublin testing", depending on the source). Regular Irish radio broadcasting began on 1 January 1926. However, people in most of Ireland could not receive 2RN's (1.5 kilowatt) signal at the time. When faced with numerous complaints from Cork regarding the writers' inability to tune in to the signal, Clandillon remarked in The Irish Radio Review, a magazine dedicated to the service, that they did not know how to operate their sets. A second station, 6CK (mostly relaying the transmissions of 2RN), was established in Cork in 1927.

A high power (initially 60 kW) station was established in Athlone, in 1932, to coincide with the staging of the Eucharistic Congress. 2RN, 6CK and Athlone became known as "Radio Athlone" or, in Irish, "Raidió Áth Luain" and were receivable across virtually the entire country. Radio Athlone was officially renamed "Radio Éireann" in 1938.

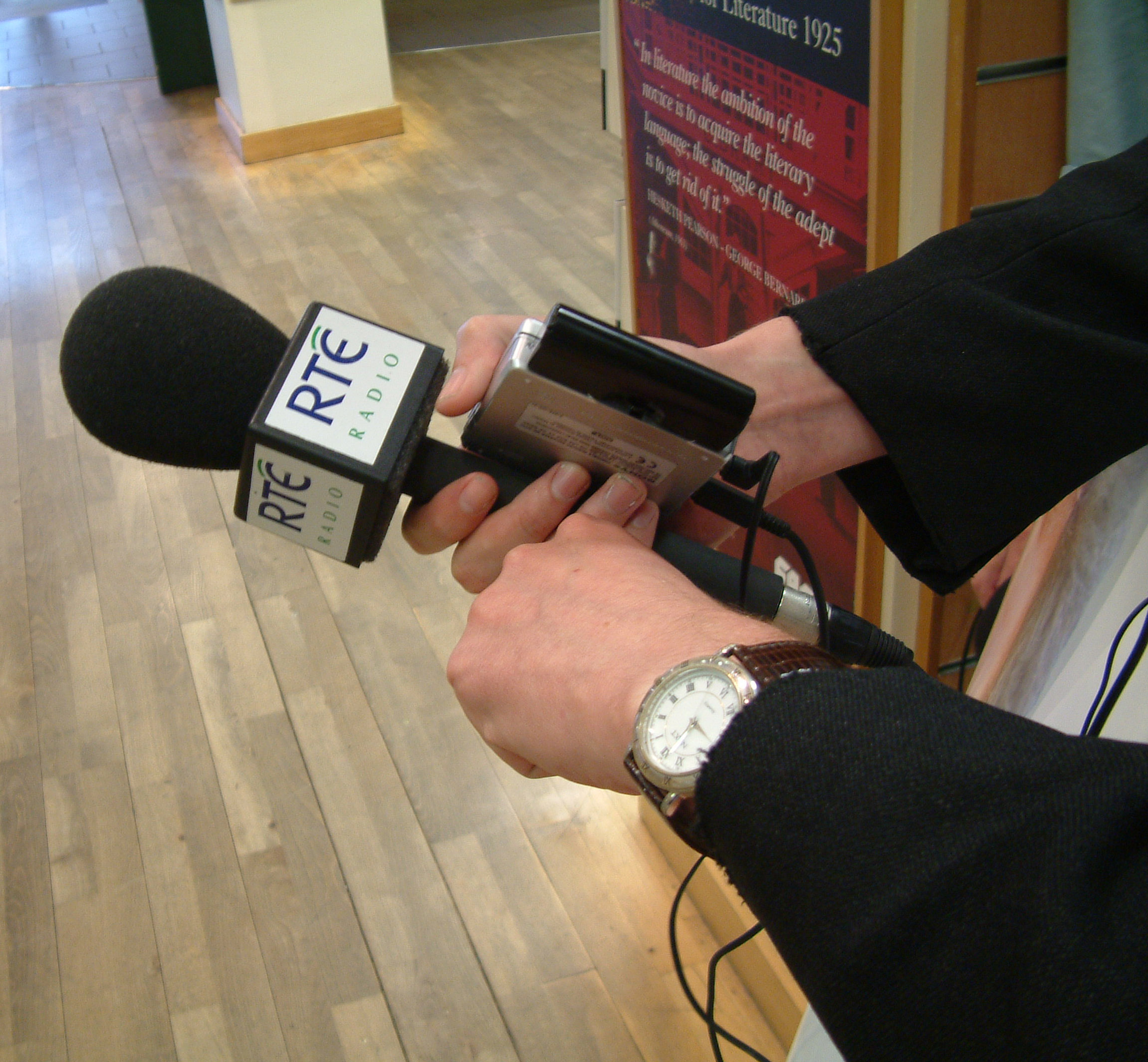
RTÉ Radio microphone in 2004

Radio Éireann had limited programming hours and a conservative programming policy. It was barely tolerated by some Irish listeners, and was often shunned in favour of BBC stations and Radio Luxembourg. This changed when Radio Éireann became free of direct government control in 1960.

Since 1928 the Radio Éireann studios had been housed in the newly rebuilt GPO on O'Connell Street in the centre of Dublin. The new broadcasting authority established in 1960 was primarily concerned with the introduction of television, but they also recognised that the radio service had long outgrown the cramped conditions in the GPO and that a new home was needed. However it was not until June 1969 that construction began on a Radio Centre alongside the existing Television Centre at Donnybrook on the Southside of Dublin. The building work was finished by April 1971 and after a period of fitting-out, the phased move from the GPO started. Live broadcasts from the Radio Centre commenced on 24 September 1973 and by May 1974 almost all programming was now coming from the new building. The old Henry Street studios however continued to be used for continuity announcements up until 8 November 1976 when the radio service finally ended its long tenancy of the GPO.

A pop music channel, RTÉ Radio 2 (renamed RTÉ 2fm in 1988), began broadcasting on 31 May 1979, founded in response to the growth of pirate radio channels.

An Irish language channel, Raidió na Gaeltachta, began broadcasting on 2 April 1972; RnaG has grown to become an influential news, music and spoken word service.

RTÉ lyric fm serves the interests of classical music and the arts, coming on air in May 1999, and replacing FM3 Classical Music, which had catered for the same target audience and time-shared with Raidió na Gaeltachta.

Now, RTÉ has a nationwide communications network with an increasing emphasis on regional news-gathering and input. Broadcasting on RTÉ Radio 1 provides comprehensive coverage of news, current affairs, music, drama and variety features, agriculture, education, religion and sport, mostly in English but also some Irish. RTÉ 2fm is a popular music and chat channel. RTÉ lyric fm serves the interests of classical music and the arts, replacing FM3 Classical Music, which had catered for the same target audience and time-shared with Raidió na Gaeltachta.

RTÉ-operated RTÉ Radio Cork (previously 'Cork 89FM' and 'RTÉ Cork Local Radio'), a local radio service in Cork. This closed in January 2000. Listen to recording from 1994 of the Cork station.

== Digital Radio and DAB ==
RTÉ Radio is streamed on the Internet and broadcast digitally on Saorview digital terrestrial television, on Virgin Media Ireland digital cable services, on the Saorsat satellite services (Spot beam on Eutelsat KA-SAT 9E) and core FM channels are available on Astra 2E @ 28.2°E, where they can be found in the Sky and Freesat EPGs or tuned manually at 11914 H 27500 5/6. Between 2006 and 2021, RTÉ Radio was also broadcast via DAB.

=== History ===
RTÉ had operated multiplex 1 (block 12C) on the Irish digital radio platform (DAB). The broadcaster launched nine digital-only channels in May 2007, as part of a trial to assess if demand existed for new radio services. This ran alongside a brief commercial radio trial MUX in some areas, which did not continue beyond the trial phase. On 30 November 2008 the trial ended and a permanent service was introduced. RTÉ officially launched six stations: RTÉ 2XM, RTÉ Chill/RTÉ Junior (timeshare), RTÉ Choice, RTÉ Gold, and RTÉ Pulse and RTÉ Radio 1 Extra.

Two of the trial stations were not continued. RTÉ Digital Radio News, which played the most recent Radio 1 news bulletin on loop and RTÉ Playback, a listen back service with content from Radio 1 and 2fm did not form part of the official launch. RTÉ Radio 1 Extra also continued to be broadcast, providing extra programming, such as sports coverage often broadcast only on the RTÉ Radio 1 Long Wave (AM) service.

Approximately 44% of the country was able to receive RTÉ DAB service. It was never extended nationally to all areas serviced by FM. Transmitters provided DAB coverage focused on three cities: Dublin, Limerick and Cork and parts of the Northeast.

On 6 November 2019, RTÉ management announced that, as part of a major cost-saving programme, all of its digital radio stations would be closed. RTÉ ceased broadcasting using DAB on 31 March 2021. However, its digital-only channels remain available as online streaming services and though the Saorview DTT service and on Virgin Media Ireland digital cable TV. Additionally, core services are carried on satellite television platforms on Astra 28.2°E, and are included in the Sky and Freesat EPGs. All services remain available streaming online, accessible through the RTÉ website and many online radio platforms, and are accessible via smart speaker services.

== FM frequencies ==
=== Main transmission sites ===
Transmitter	Service area	Radio 1 (MHz)	2FM (MHz)	RnaG (MHz)	Lyric FM (MHz)	ERP (kW)
Cairn Hill	The Midlands	89.8	92.0	94.2	99.4	20
Clermont Carn	NE Ireland, Northern Ireland	87.8	97.0	102.7	95.2	40
Holywell Hill	Donegal, Derry	89.2	91.4	93.6	98.8	6
Kippure	Dublin, Wicklow, SE Midlands	89.1	91.3	93.5	98.7	50
Maghera	West Ireland	88.8	91.0	93.2	98.4	160
Mount Leinster	SE Ireland	89.6	91.8	94.0	99.2	20
Mullaghanish	SW Ireland	90.0	92.2	94.4	99.6	160
Spur Hill	Cork city	89.2	91.4	93.6	98.8	5
Three Rock	Dublin city and county	88.5	90.7	92.9	96.7	5
Truskmore	NW Ireland	88.2	90.4	92.6	97.8	125

== Longwave ==
RTÉ Radio One was relayed on longwave, using the former Atlantic 252 transmitter in County Meath. This service ended in 2023 and the mast was then demolished.

Transmitter	Service area	Frequency	ERP(kW)
Clarkstown, Summerhill, County Meath	Ireland, UK with overspill into much of Western Europe	252 kHz	300 (day); 100(night)

== Shortwave ==
RTÉ occasionally broadcasts on shortwave bands aimed at the Irish Diaspora, for example, with RTÉ Radio One coverage of GAA All-Ireland Finals in several years, for around one hour a day.

Transmitter	Service area	Frequency	Times
Bloemendal, Meyerton, South Africa	Africa	5840 kHz	19:30-20:30 UTC

=== Special frequencies for GAA All-Ireland Finals ===
The Meyerton transmitter site in South Africa was used to relay this 17540 kHz in 2012.

Transmitter	Service area	Frequency	Times
	East Africa	17725 kHz	2-5pm
	East Africa	11620 kHz	5-6pm
	Southern Africa	7405 kHz	2-6pm
	West Africa	7505 kHz	2-6pm

== See also ==
- Raidió Teilifís Éireann
- Ulysses (broadcast)
