= Mass media in the Republic of Ireland =

The mass media in the Republic of Ireland includes all the media and communications outlets of the Republic.

== Print media ==
Ireland has a traditionally a competitive print media, which is divided into daily national newspapers and weekly regional newspapers, as well as national Sunday editions. Competition from international markets is also strong in Ireland many publications from the US, the UK and Central Europe are widely available in Ireland. The strength of the UK press is a unique feature of the Irish print media scene, with the availability of a wide selection of British published newspapers and magazines, many of these UK editions produce specialist versions for the Irish market e.g. Irish Daily Mail and the Irish Sun. Some of the most popular national newspapers include The Irish Times, the Irish Independent and the Irish Examiner. Local and regional papers include The Kerryman, the Evening Herald and the Evening Echo. The use of digitised versions of newspapers and websites is increasingly becoming popular, however readership amongst physical newspapers is still high in Ireland when compared to other European countries.

Newspapers are popular in Ireland. According to the National Newspapers of Ireland and Joint National Readership Survey 91% of Irish adults regularly read newspapers. The market penetration for daily newspapers runs at 190% and 350% for Sunday titles. For comparison, US newspaper market penetration is only 51%.

There are several daily newspapers in Ireland, including the Irish Independent, The Irish Examiner, The Irish Times, Irish Daily Star, and the Evening Herald. The best selling of these is the Irish Independent, which is published in both tabloid and broadsheet formats.

The leading Sunday newspaper in terms of circulation is the Sunday Independent which has over a million readers each week, a very large number considering that Ireland has only 1.25 million households. Other popular papers include The Sunday Business Post, Irish Mail on Sunday and the Sunday World (the latter published in separate editions for the Republic and Northern Ireland).

One noted trend in Irish newspapers is the presence of Irish editions of UK newspapers, these include The Irish Sun, Irish Mirror, and the Irish edition of The Sunday Times.

== Linear and digital broadcasting ==
RTÉ is the public service broadcaster of Ireland and is funded by a licence fee and advertising. RTÉ operates four national television channels; RTÉ One, RTÉ2, RTÉ News and RTÉ KIDSjr. Virgin Media Television operates four channels (Virgin Media One, Virgin Media Two, Virgin Media Three and Virgin Media Four) and remains Ireland's biggest independent broadcasters.

TG4 is a public service broadcaster for Irish language speakers. All of these channels are available on Saorview, the national free-to-air digital terrestrial television service. HD variants of RTÉ One and RTÉ2 are available on Saorview, as are timeshift variants (+1 channels).

Subscription services include Virgin Media Ireland (formerly UPC Ireland), Eir (telecommunications) and Sky Ireland, which offer a wide variety of television channels from outside of Ireland, increasing competition for Irish broadcasters. The presence of on-demand streaming services such as Netflix have also increased pressure on private and public broadcasters in Ireland.

Most of the major broadcasters in Ireland operate streaming services, such as RTÉ Player, Virgin Media Player and TG4 Player. Some Irish owned channels are subscription only; these include Eir Sport channels.

== Radio broadcasting ==
Radio listenership is still very high, in Ireland with 83% of Irish adults tuning into radio each day.

There are many national radio services operated by public broadcasters (RTÉ Radio 1, RTÉ 2fm, RTÉ lyric fm and RTÉ Raidió na Gaeltachta) and private broadcasters (Today FM, Newstalk and Ireland's Classic Hits Radio.

Until 31 March 2021, a national DAB service was also available, which was largely made up of RTÉ's stations but included digital-only stations RTÉ 2XM, RTÉ Gold, RTÉ Pulse, RTÉ Radio 1 Extra and RTÉ Jr Radio. Since the closure of the DAB multiplex, these stations are available via other means, such as Saorview and the internet.

A large number of regional and local radio stations are available countrywide. A survey showed that a consistent 85% of adults listen to a mixture of national, regional and local stations on a daily basis.

Radio and television broadcasters are regulated by the Coimisiún na Meán.

== Film and television industry ==
Supported by the Screen Ireland (formerly Irish Film Board), the Irish film ad television industry has grown significantly since the 1990s, with the promotion of indigenous films such as Intermission and Breakfast on Pluto, as well as the attraction of international productions such as Braveheart and Saving Private Ryan. Many television shows such as the Game of Thrones, The Vikings and other international shows have been produced/filmed in the Republic of Ireland and Northern Ireland.

== Online ==
Along with the online websites from the traditional media (newspapers, magazines, TV and radio), some of which complement their traditional offerings, there are a number of online media outlets and portals, such as TheJournal.ie, Joe.ie, The Ditch (one of whose founders is Paddy Cosgrave), Dublin Live and Irish Central (aimed at the Irish emigrant community founded by Niall O'Dowd of the Irish Voice in the US).

== See also ==
- Censorship in the Republic of Ireland

== Music ==
The Cranberries are a famous rock band from Ireland. Their lead singer, Dolores O'Riordan, died in 2018, causing The Cranberries to disband; one of their most popular songs is Dreams, frequently used in the Irish TV show Derry Girls.

u2 is another rock band from Ireland.
