= PlanetLove =

Annual Northern Irish electronic music festival

- Genre: Electronic dance music
- Dates: September (Annually)
- Location: Northern Ireland
- Years active: 1998–2011, 2021+
- Founders: PLM Promotions
- Capacity: 10,000 – 15,000
- Organiser: Notorious Brands
- Website: PlanetLove

PlanetLove is an annual Northern Irish electronic music festival which has been held in periods since 1998. Now held at Boucher Road Playing Fields in Belfast, its previous home was at Shane's Castle near Randalstown in County Antrim. It was also previously held at Nutts Corner (also in Antrim), Kings Hall, Belfast and near Cookstown in County Tyrone.

== History ==
The festival was pioneered by BBMagazine's Judith Farell-Rowan and Eddie Wray. BBM Closed in 2004 to concentrate on the music festival and parent company, PLM Promotions.

Notably, the festival has been headlined or co-headlined by Paul van Dyk in every year except 2005, 2008, 2021 and 2023. The festival has been at least partially broadcast on BBC Radio 1 between 2006 and 2008. In the first editions it was broadcast on RTÉ 2fm.

It held its 10th-anniversary festival on the weekend of 5–6 September 2008, with headliners including Tiësto, Ferry Corsten, Rank 1, Pendulum, and many more with nine stages, the biggest yet. Camping was also available, along with the 2010 festival have been the only two to span across two days.

An Irish version of the festival, "PlanetLove Summer Session", was held on the same day as the 2007 Northern festival, this was in association with RTÉ 2fm and broadcast on this and the digital-only RTÉ 2XM; and was held again on a separate date in 2008, again broadcast on 2fm and the newly launched RTÉ Pulse.

The branding has also extended to winter-time arena events and club nights on the island of Ireland.

Following the recession of 2010/11 and a decline in the popularity of dance music, Planet Love promoter and owner Eddie Wray ceased to trade in 2011.

Notorious Brands returned with the Planetlove festival in 2021, being held at Boucher Road Playing Fields, Belfast. Due to COVID-19 restrictions, the festival had to be fully open-air with four stages facing away from each other. In 2022 the festival again took place at Boucher Road Playing Fields in Belfast with the following stages: LOVE, GoodGreef Xtra Hard, Subculture, YOYO, Met Arena, and VIP. This was the first festival under Big-Top tents since 2011 (11 years).

In 2023 the festival took place again at Boucher Road Playing Fields, Belfast. The festival celebrated 25 years of Planetlove and dance music, although this wasn't a 25th anniversary festival due to the event not taking place between 2012 and 2021. The festival had a large roster of local acts playing and didn't not have any notable headliners for once. Stages included: LOVE, Subculture, Met Areana, GoodGreef Xtra Hard, Stack City Raves, VIP. Heavy rain in the lead up to the event made it a bit of a muddy event, with the Subculture tent half submerged in 5/6 inches of water.

== Festival List ==
- Planetlove 98 (Battery Inn, Banks of Lough Neagh)
- Planetlove 99 (Nutt's Corner)
- Planetlove 2000 (Nutt's Corner)
- Planetlove 2001 (Nutt's Corner)
- Planetlove 2002 (Shane's Castle)
- Planetlove 2003 (Shane's Castle)
- Planetlove 2005 (Shane's Castle)
- Planetlove 2006 (Shane's Castle)
- Planetlove 2007 (Shane's Castle)
- Planetlove 2008 (10 Year Celebrations and 2 Day Event with Camping) (Shane's Castle)
- Planetlove 2009 (Shane's Castle)
- Planetlove 2010 (2 Day Event) (King's Hall)
- Planetlove 2011 (Shane's Castle)
- Planetlove 2021 (Boucher Road Playing Fields)
- Planetlove 2022 (Sept 10, 2022) (Boucher Road Playing Fields)
- Planetlove 2023 (Sept 16, 2023) (25 Years since inception anniversary) (Boucher Road Playing Fields)

== See also ==
- List of electronic music festivals
