= Spur Hill transmission site =

Transmitter site near Cork, Ireland

Spur Hill
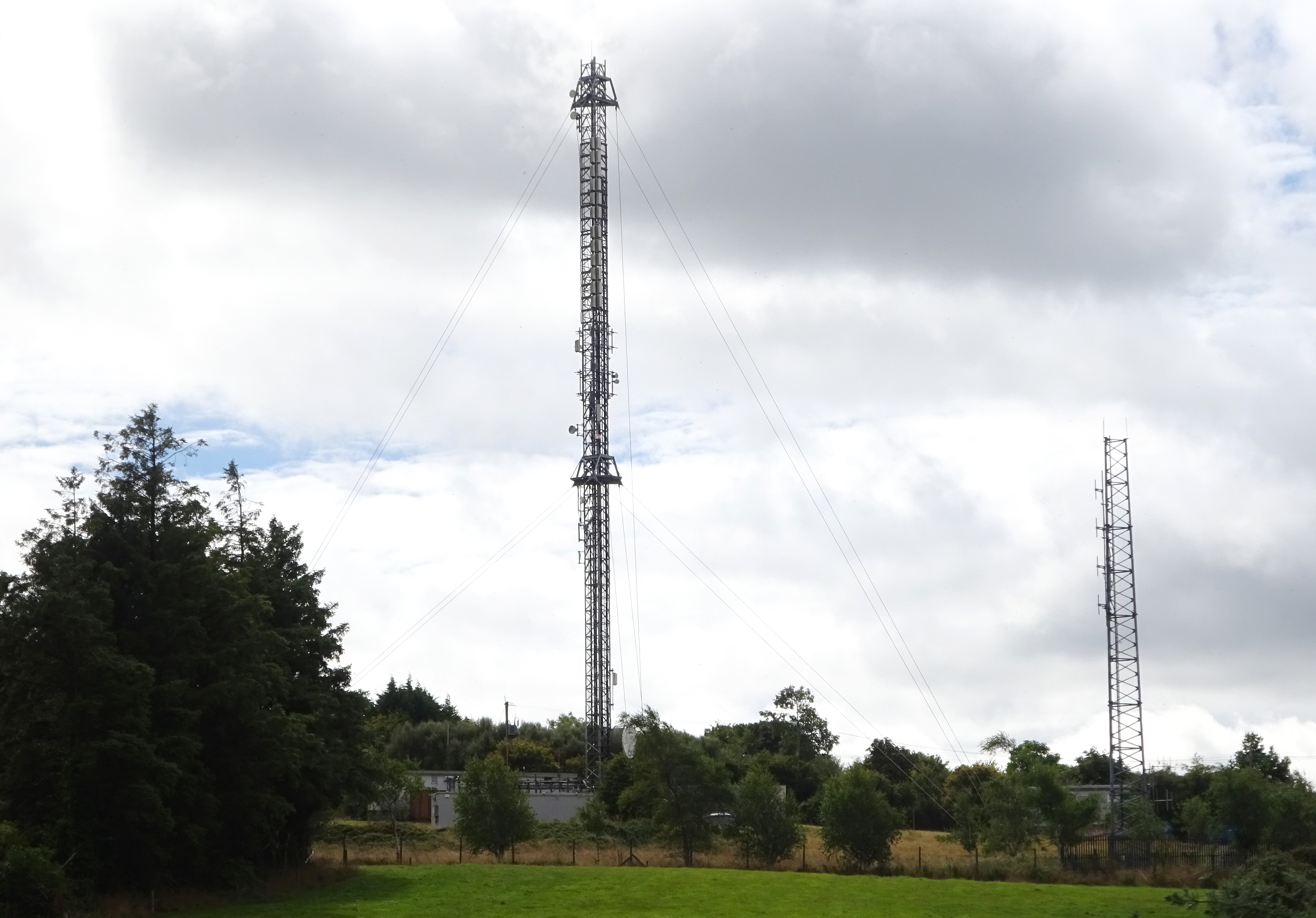
- 2RN transmission site at Spur Hill

- Spur Hill, County Cork, Ireland
- Location: Spur Hill, County Cork
- Mast height: 60 metres (197 ft)
- Coordinates: 51°51′22″N 8°30′58″W
- Built: 1965

The Spur Hill transmission site is located on a 137-metre hill southwest of Cork city in Ireland, just northwest of Cork airport.

== History ==
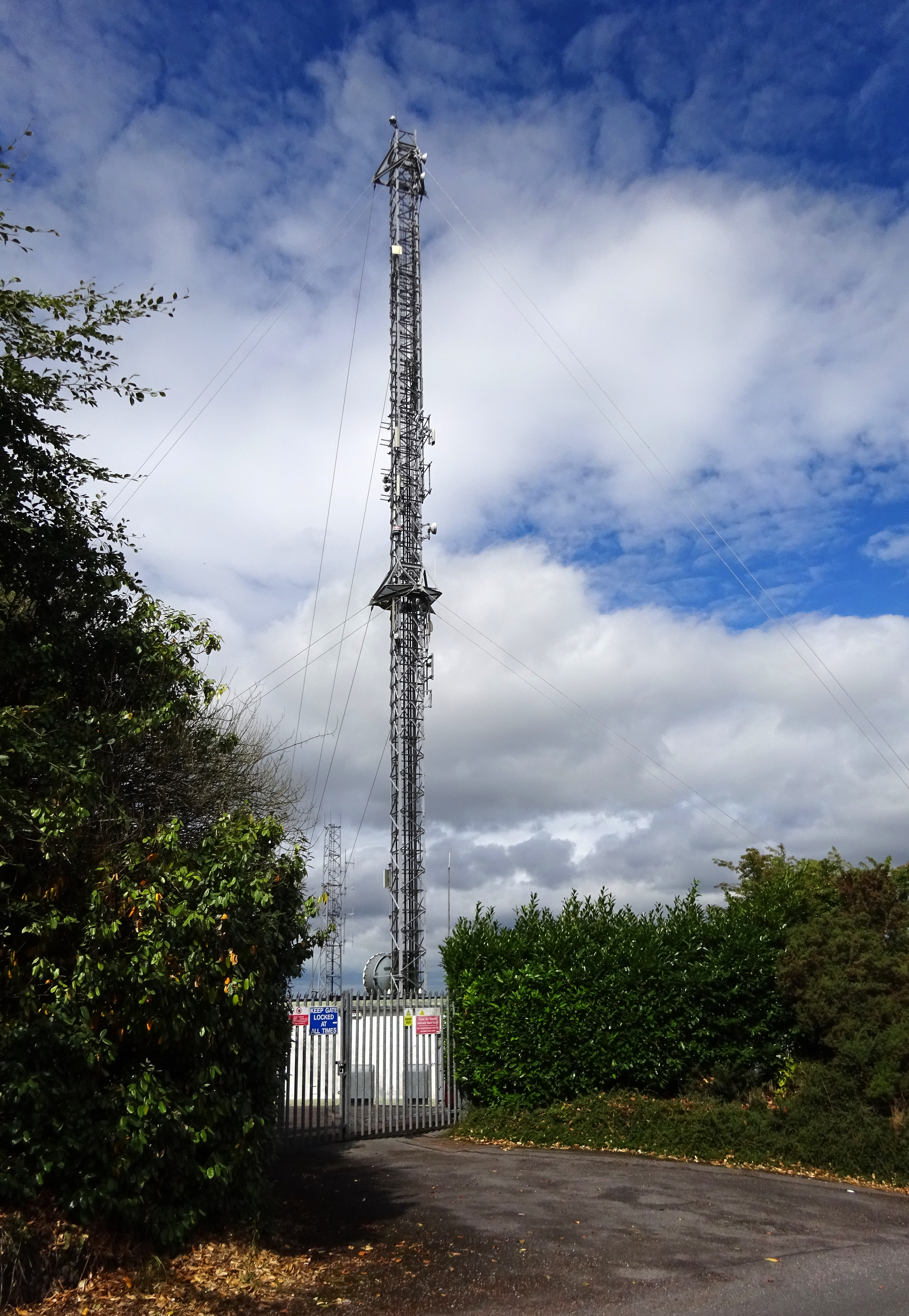
Entrance to the Spur Hill site

The transmitter was initially opened in 1965 as a VHF television relay of the main Mullaghanish television transmitter in County Cork, with FM radio transmission later being added to provide a relay of the national radio channels,

On its conversion to UHF television transmission in 1996, it became the main transmitter serving Cork city, carrying the four Irish analogue channels, RTÉ One (Ch53), RTÉ Two (Ch57), Virgin Media One (Ch60), and TG4 (Ch63) at an effective radiated power (ERP) of 20 kW from a 60-metre steel lattice mast.

On 24 October 2012 all analogue television transmission ended in Ireland, and the station now provides the Irish DTT service Saorview to Cork city and environs. It is owned and operated by 2RN, a subsidiary of the Irish national broadcaster RTÉ.

== Current transmissions ==
=== Digital television ===
Frequency	UHF	ERP	Multiplex	Pol
666 MHz	45	50 kW	Saorview 1	H
618 MHz	39	50 kW	Saorview 2	H

=== FM radio ===
Frequency	ERP	Service
89.2 MHz	5 kW	RTÉ Radio 1
91.4 MHz	5 kW	RTÉ 2fm
93.6 MHz	5 kW	RTÉ Raidió na Gaeltachta
98.8 MHz	5 kW	RTÉ lyric fm
101.0 MHz	5 kW	Today FM

=== Spur Hill relay transmitter ===
DTT Relay	County	Mux 1	Mux 2	ERP	Pol
Collins Barracks	Cork	32	34	0.08 kW	V
