= Zenith Classic Rock =

Radio station in Waterford, Ireland

- Waterford; Ireland
- Broadcast area: DAB: Dublin and Cork; Radio: Southeast Ireland
- Frequencies: AM: 1584 kHz; FM: 103.8 MHz

Programming
- Language: English
- Format: Classic rock

Ownership
- Owner: Andy Linton

History
- First air date: 2007

Links
- Website: Official Website

Zenith Classic Rock is an independent regional radio station in Ireland broadcasting from Kilkenny. It is owned by Andy Linton of Total Broadcast Consultants Ltd. and airs a Classic rock format, targeting an adult audience.

The station can also be heard on shortwave.

Other stations run by the same organisation are Harmony Beautiful Music, and Rebel Ska and Reggae.

Zenith Classic Rock is one of Ireland's oldest internet stations. It has been airing on terrestrial radio since 2010 and DAB since 2013.
