= Clarkstown radio transmitter =

Demolished longwave transmitter in Ireland

Clarkstown
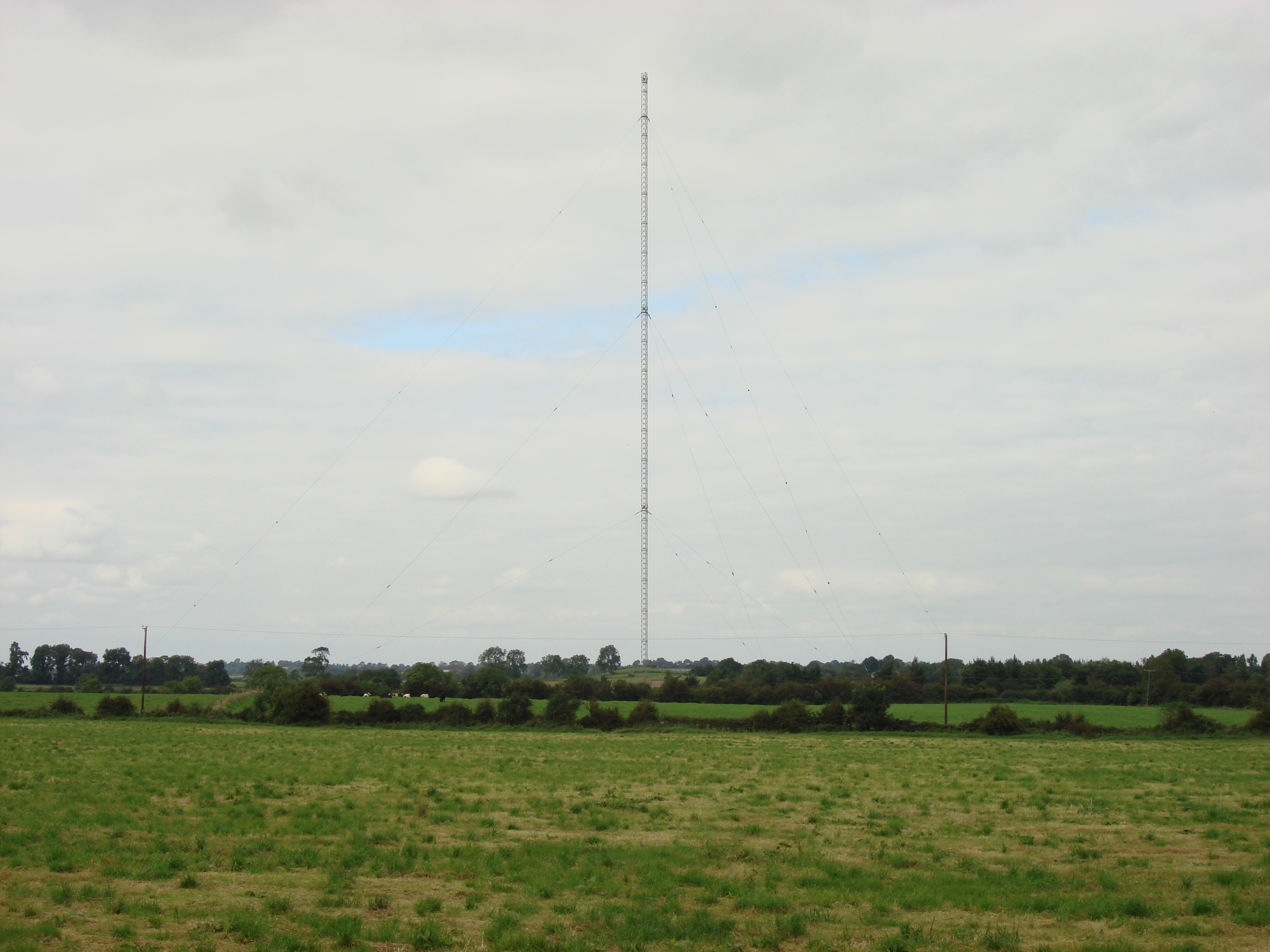
- The Clarkstown site in 2007

- Clarkstown in Ireland
- Location: Clarkstown, County Meath
- Mast height: 248 metres (814 ft)
- Coordinates: 53.462649°N 6.677589°W
- Built: 1988
- Demolished: 2023

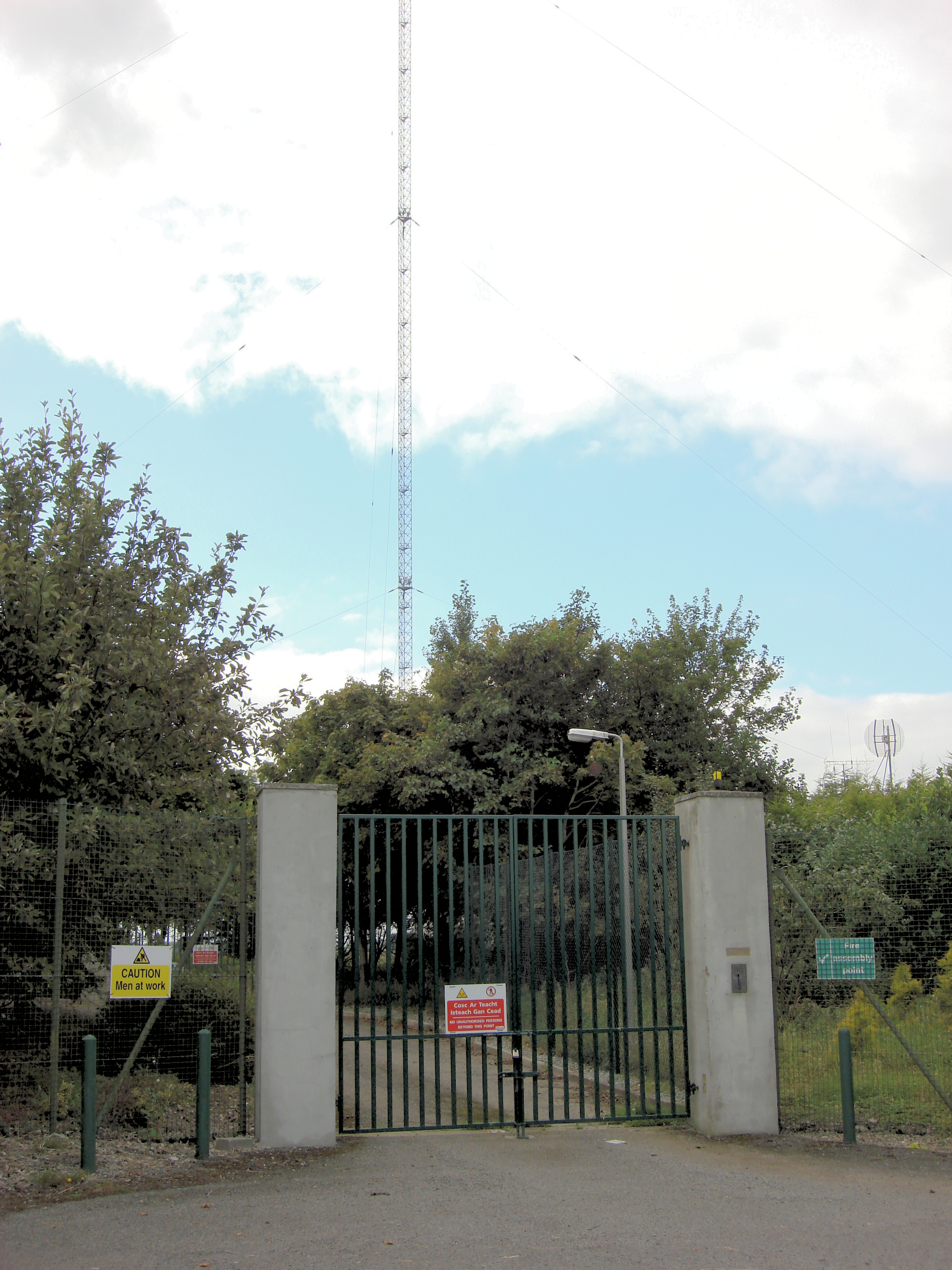
The site entrance

The Clarkstown radio transmitter was a longwave radio transmitter in County Meath, Ireland. The mast was located approximately 3.5 kilometres (2.2 mi) east of the village of Summerhill, in a field south of the R156 regional road at Clarkstown. At 248 metres high, it was more than double the height of the Spire in Dublin.

== History ==
Constructed in 1988 for the transmission of Atlantic 252 on 252 kHz, it used one 248-metre (814 ft) high guyed steel framework mast with triangular cross section, insulated from ground. The original transmitters were two 300-kilowatt Continental transmitters built by Varian Associates of Dallas. These were replaced in 2007 by a single 300 kilowatt Transradio TRAM 300L transmitter. The ground around the mast and the entire transmission site bed are lined with copper for conductivity. The site has an ITU-cleared transmission power of 500 kW by day and 100 kW at night but was later only capable of operating at 300 kW by day and 100 kW at night.

Atlantic 252 ceased operations on 2 January 2002 and sports radio station TEAMtalk 252 briefly took over the frequency for a few months in 2002. The transmitter was later taken over by RTÉ Networks Limited (now 2RN). It was used for the AM version of RTÉ Radio 1 on 252 kHz from 2004 to 2023, and was the sole source of RTÉ Radio 1 on AM from 24 March 2008, when the medium wave Tullamore transmitter on 567 kHz was taken off air, to 2023.

In 2007, the transmitter carried a Digital Radio Mondiale multiplex overnight, featuring Radio 1, RTÉ Digital Radio Sport, RTÉ Digital Radio News and the World Radio Network, before reverting to AM transmission for the daytime. DRM tests since ceased, with AM transmissions operating full-time once again until closedown in 2023.

On 24 September 2014, RTÉ announced that broadcasting of RTÉ Radio 1 on 252 kHz would cease on 27 October 2014, however following representations from Irish listeners in the UK and others, that date was postponed. On 31 March 2023, RTÉ announced that the longwave service would be discontinued on 14 April of that year., and this happened as planned.

The mast was felled on Thursday 27 July 2023.

== Timeline ==
- 1988: Construction of Clarkstown Transmitter by Radio Tara (RTÉ/RTL)
- 1989: Launch of Atlantic 252 on 1 September 1989, a pop music station aimed at UK and Irish market
- 2002: 2 January, closure of Atlantic 252
- 2002: 11 March, launch of TEAMtalk 252, aimed at UK and Irish market
- 2002: 30 June, TEAMtalk 252 closes
- 2002: RTÉ take over the running of the Clarkstown Transmitter following demise of TEAMtalk
- 2004: January, official launch of RTÉ Radio 1 on Long Wave
- 2004: While the Tullamore transmitter was off air for maintenance, Clarkstown provided Radio 1's AM service
- 2007: Major upgrade of transmitter
- 2007: RTÉ runs DRM tests, in parallel with analogue AM service
- 2008: 24 March, closure of RTÉ Medium Wave service leaving 252 Long Wave as the only AM Broadcast by RTÉ. Services which were on Medium Wave transferred to Long Wave.
- 2008: 1 December, launch of RTÉ Radio 1 Extra which was extra content not broadcast on FM was now relayed on Long Wave 252
- 2014: RTÉ announces plans to close Long Wave 252, September 2014
- 2014: RTÉ postpones closure plans until 2017
- 2017: RTÉ announce a further postponement of closure plans until June 2019
- 2019: Oireachtas Communications Committee announce the rebuilding of the antenna system and postponement of closure plans at least until 2021
- 2023: March 31, RTÉ announces the closure of 252 kHz
- 2023: April 15, RTÉ stops broadcasting on long wave
- 2023: July 27, The Clarkstown Mast is demolished

== Gallery ==
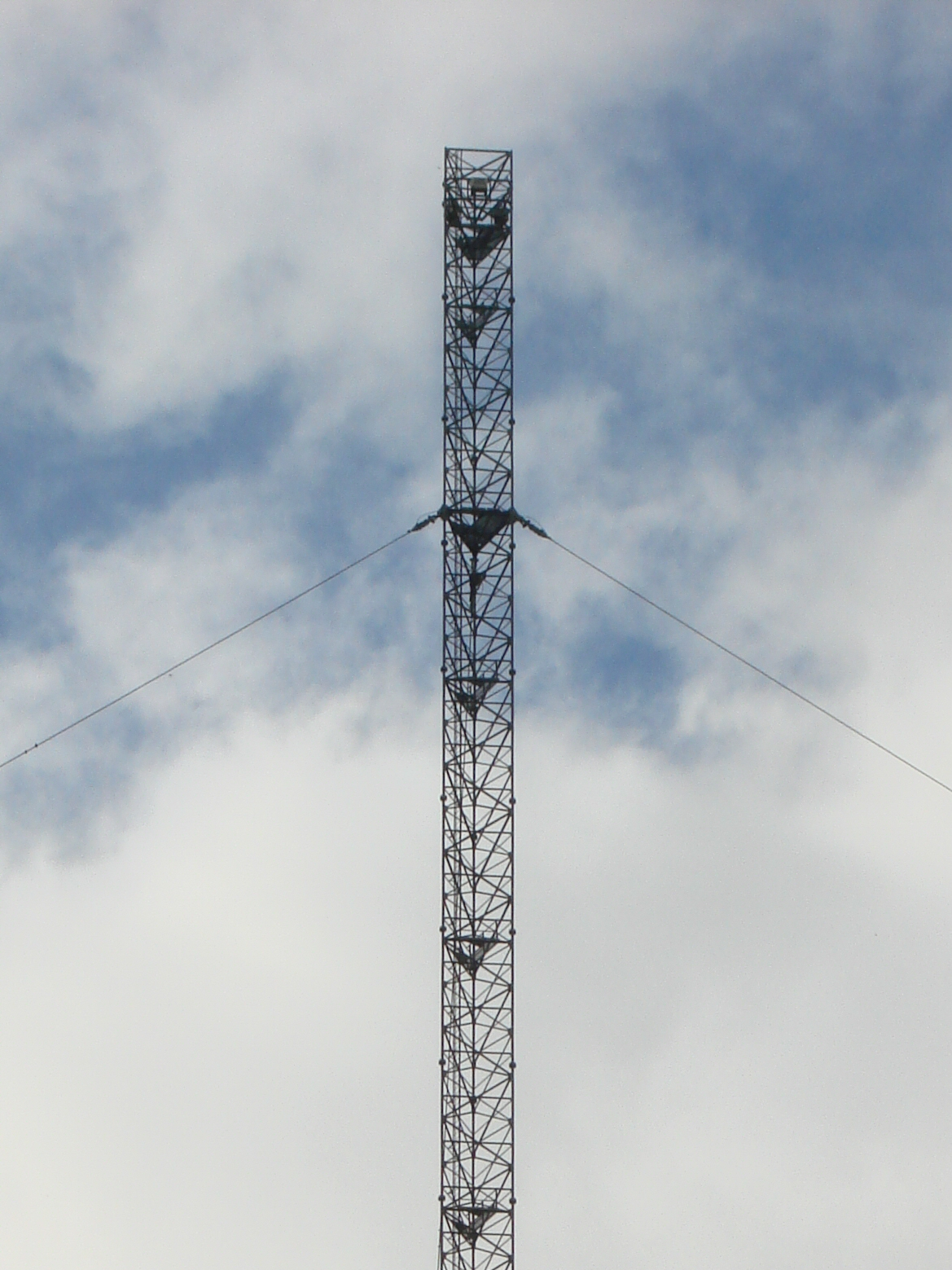
Close up of the mast

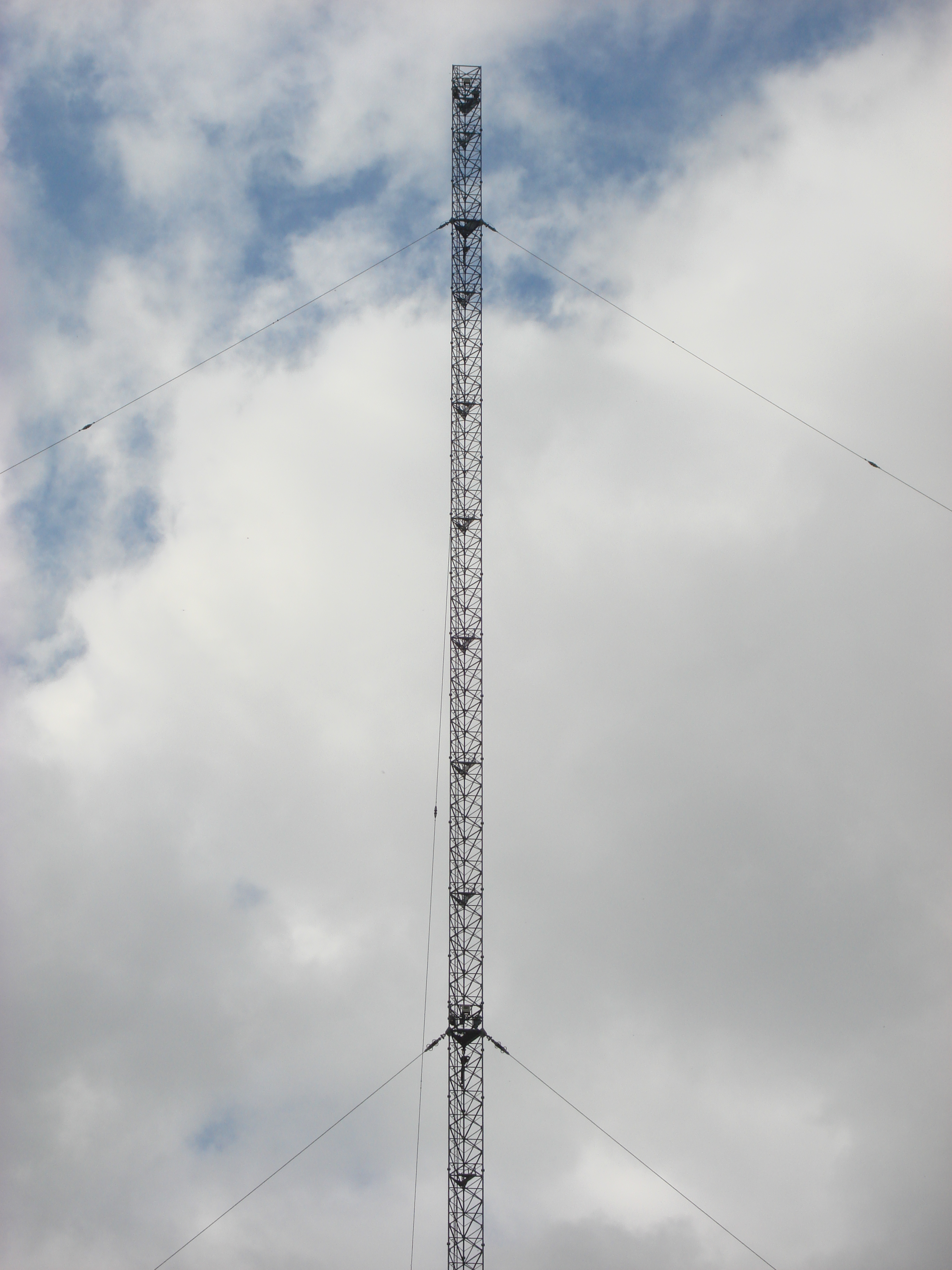
Wider shot of the mast

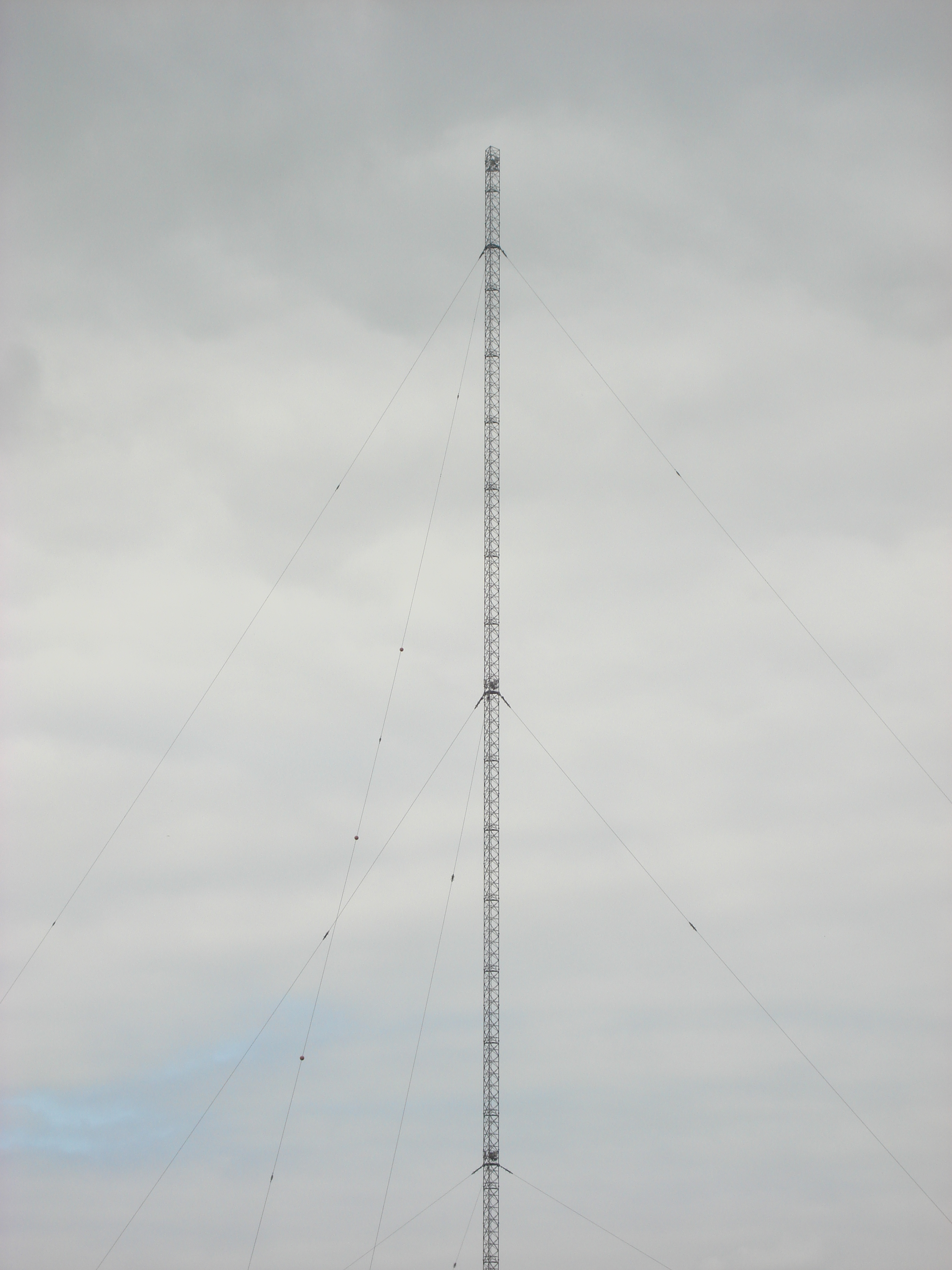
Guy lines stabilizing the mast

== See also ==
- List of tallest structures in the world
- List of tallest structures in Ireland
