= Athlone transmitting station =

Radio transmitter near Athlone in Ireland

Athlone
- Location within Ireland
- Location: Athlone, Ireland
- Coordinates: 53.420833°N 7.881389°W
- Built: 1932

The Athlone transmitting station is a decommissioned AM radio transmission site in the townland of Moydrum, near the town of Athlone, County Westmeath, Ireland. The site is notable for being displayed on European valve radios at the time.

== History ==
The Athlone transmitter was brought into service in 1932 for that year's Eucharistic Congress in Dublin as Radio Athlone (later Radio Éireann). It was switched off after the event to allow for completion of the site and reopened on 6 February 1933 at 60 kW ERP with a water-cooled Marconi transmitter; later upgraded to 100 kW. A T-aerial was used, which was suspended between two 300 ft masts. The Marconi transmitter was replaced around 1958 with an air-cooled Brown Boveri transmitter, also rated at 100 kW ERP.

In 1975, a new site near Tullamore in County Offaly replaced the Athlone transmitter. The transmitter at Tullamore was capable of up to 500 kW ERP. Athlone was brought back into service from 1979 to carry RTÉ Radio 2, now known as RTÉ 2fm. This used a pair of Continental Electronics 317 transmitters at 50 kW each, to achieve the same 100 kW ERP. Transmissions ceased on 12 April 2004 and the site has been out of use since then. One of the masts was demolished in the early 2010s as it was in poor condition.

== Transmission frequencies ==
Athlone operated on 725 kHz (413 metres) for its first few years. It then moved to 565 kHz (531 metres) until 1950 when it was changed again to 566 kHz (530 metres) as part of changes introduced in the 1948 ITU Copenhagen convention. When it reopened for RTÉ Radio 2 in 1979, the frequency was changed to 612 kHz (490 metres).

== Future ==
All three generations of transmission equipment remain in situ at the site, which has resulted in calls for the site to be preserved as a museum exhibit. A feasibility study was approved in 2013 and plans were announced in 2018 for a €7.5 million science centre to be incorporated into the site.
