= 1 Extra =

1 Extra may refer to:

- BBC Radio 1Xtra, a British radio station
- NPO 1 Extra, a Dutch television channel
- RTÉ Radio 1 Extra, a former Irish radio station
