= 8Radio =

Irish radio station

8radio
- Dublin; Ireland
- Broadcast area: Ireland via the Internet; Leinster via DAB+
- Frequency: DAB+: 7C/10D FáilteDAB
- Branding: Playing the Music We Like

Programming
- Language: English
- Format: Rock/alternative

Ownership
- Owner: 8radio Vision Ltd.

History
- First air date: 2013; 13 years ago

Links
- Webcast: Listen Live
- Website: 8radio.com

8Radio.com is an Irish radio station, started in 2013 by Phantom FM founder Simon Maher. It is mostly an online music station, but broadcasts on DAB+ in Leinster, and has sometimes received a temporary licence from the Broadcasting Authority of Ireland (BAI) for FM broadcasts in Dublin, Cork, Galway and Limerick.

Some of the station's presenters have had previous involvement with Phantom FM. Some others have previously worked with Dublin City FM and Raidió Na Life.

Its founder, Simon Maher, has described the station as finding "a niche among music lovers and those who may not currently consume much, if any, traditional FM radio".

Following the launch of FáilteDAB in 2025, 8Radio began broadcasting on DAB+ throughout Dublin and the wider Leinster area.
