= Nikki Hayes =

Irish radio DJ (born 1979)

- Hayes at the 2009 Meteor Awards
- Born: Eimear O'Keeffe; 7 May 1979 (age 47)
- Years active: 1995–present
- Career
- Stations: East Coast FM & Classic Hits
- Country: Ireland
- Website: twitter.com/nikkihayes

Nikki Hayes (born Eimear O' Keeffe on 7 May 1979) is a DJ who currently works for East Coast FM. She previously presented on Classic Hits and RTÉ 2fm and has also DJ'ed in numerous clubs across Ireland.

== RTÉ 2fm ==
Hayes joined RTÉ 2fm from SPIN 1038 in November 2003. (Before SPIN 1038, she had her first stint with East Coast FM that followed a period with pirate radio.) She obtained a show of her own during the weekends. Then, when Rick O'Shea moved along to present the now defunct The Rick & Ruth Breakfast Show, Hayes replaced him and in doing so was given her own weekday show which was broadcast from Monday until Thursday from 20:00 until 22:00. In March 2007, she moved to a weekday show broadcast from 12:00 midday until 14:00. The All-Request Lunch show featured Hayes presenting all alone with listeners sending in requests by text, phone and the networking site, Bebo. In August 2007 it was reported that she had increased her listenership by 11,000. In December 2009 it was announced that Hayes was moving to a weekend slot as part of a schedule shake-up at the radio station. Mid August 2010, Hayes parted company with RTÉ after another major schedule shake up.

== SPIN 1038 ==
On 20 October 2010 it was announced that Hayes would start a new show in a weekday morning time-slot on SPIN 1038. Hayes took over SPIN @ Work from Shona Ryan. She began on 1 November 2010 after an eight-year departure from the station. Shortly after she joined, the show was renamed SPIN Hits which is linked with the afternoon show presented by Steve K. Speaking about her return, Hayes has said it was like "coming home". The show featured 10 SPIN Hits in a Row, listener phone calls and interaction with The Spinis. Hayes also used the social networking sites Facebook and Twitter to interact with listeners. Hayes was strongly linked with Dundrum Town Centre and broadcast from there regularly. Hayes announced her departure from the show and presented her last 'Spin Hits' on 3 June 2016.

== Personal life ==
Originally from Bray, Hayes now lives in Dublin and was married to soldier Frank Black but they have been separated for some time. She is interested in criminology, after studying law in college at the Letterkenny Institute of Technology (LYIT) in Ulster, and wishes to follow on studying it as a hobby.

Hayes gave birth to her daughter with Frank, named Farah, in December 2013. She returned to her morning slot on SPIN 1038 after a 6-month leave after her labour.

=== Assault ===
Hayes was publicly assaulted in a hotel in the Temple Bar district of Dublin in April 2008. After receiving a black eye she was grateful for the support of her boss John Clarke and fellow broadcaster Gerry Ryan but was not seen in public for some months following the attack.

=== Health ===
Hayes has suffered from stress and caught an infection which required her to stick to a diet of only protein. In February 2012, she revealed that, worried about her health, her boyfriend and family members have urged her to stop dieting but that she is happy and she has control of her weight.

On Ireland AM, Hayes publicly admitted a battle with depression and that she had attempted to take her own life. She was diagnosed with anorexia nervosa at the age of fifteen, and was diagnosed with borderline personality disorder in 2015. in 2023 she announced that she was going into rehab for addiction treatment in Tiglin.

=== Criminal Charges ===
In May 2023, she faced charges of money laundering.

As of October 2024 she was not convicted and spared jail time, she was discharged completely from the indictment due to mental illness at that time of the money laundering where Gardai cited her as genuinely vulnerable and taken advantage of.
