= Saor Raidió Chonamara =

Ireland
- Frequency: 1484 kHz

Programming
- Languages: Irish

History
- Founded: 17 October 1969
- First air date: 28 March 1970
- Last air date: November 1970

Saor Raidió Chonamara (Free Radio Connemara) was an Irish language pirate radio station that was formed out of frustration over the lack of Irish-language media by the civil rights movement Gluaiseacht Cearta Sibhialta. The station was inspired by "Radio Free Derry" set up at the outbreak of the Troubles in 1969. Seosamh Ó Cuaig, one of the key organisers, announced in the Connacht Tribune on 17 October 1969 that a fully Irish-language pirate station was being planned, noting that a transmitter could be acquired for £50. With technical support from Micheál Ó hÉalaithe, an engineering student at University College Cork, Saor-Raidió Chonamara made its debut broadcast on 1484 kHz (202 metres) from a caravan in Ros Muc on Saturday 28 March 1970. The station remained on the air until Sunday 5 April, and resumed later that year in November to coincide with the Oireachtas na nGael festival, also hosted in Ros Muc.

The station gained some press coverage (it was featured in the Irish Independent once and in the regional press). These transmissions in the Gaeltacht were illegal (RTÉ had the monopoly at the time). The station maintained a certain level of secrecy with the transmitter and studio transported by Honda 50 at times to stay clear of the law.

The station's success helped force the Irish Government to establish RTÉ Raidió na Gaeltachta which finally came on the air in 1972.
