= Tullamore transmitter =

Dismantled radio mast near Tullamore, Ireland

Coordinates: 53°16′42″N 07°22′18″W

The Tullamore transmitter was an AM radio transmission mast located near Tullamore, Ireland. Built in 1975 to replace the Athlone transmitter, it always carried RTÉ Radio 1 on 567 kHz, at 500 kW. The old Athlone mast was used to carry RTÉ 2fm, and was later decommissioned. The Tullamore transmitter was demolished in 2023.

It was taken offline for a time in 2004 for major maintenance, with the Clarkstown transmitter in County Meath taking over Tullamore's AM broadcast. Tullamore ceased analogue broadcasts permanently on 24 March 2008, as the Clarkstown longwave transmitter provides improved coverage of the United Kingdom at the same transmission power.

The antenna, a 290-metre (950 ft) tall guyed mast, was the tallest structure in Ireland. It was demolished on 25 July 2023.

For a time RTÉ Radio broadcast a second signal from the Tullamore site, on 252 kHz longwave, before the setting up of Radio Tara and the building of the Clarkstown mast, to which the frequency was allocated.

== See also ==
- List of famous transmission sites
