= Jimmy Greeley =

Irish radio voiceover (born 1945)

- Born: James Greeley; 12 September 1945 (age 80); Dublin, Ireland
- Occupations: TV presenter, Radio presenter, newsreader
- Employer(s): 4fm City Channel

James Greeley (born 12 September 1945) is an Irish radio voiceover. He worked for 4fm until early 2012.

Greeley is a veteran of Irish radio having worked for many stations such as Millennium 88FM, RTÉ 2fm RTÉ News and RTÉ Radio 1. In May 1994 he joined Dublin's local station 98FM, presenting the weekday Morning News, alongside the Head Teena Gates. Greeley spent 14 years in that post. In 2006 he began a new show on the City Channel called On The Menu programme. In February 2009, after spending 14 years as a newsreader, Greeley left 98FM to join Ireland's new station 4fm, where he started off working Monday to Friday from 9:00 a.m. to 12:00 p.m., then moved to the 11:00 a.m.-3:00 p.m. time slot.

In May 2011, following the schedule changes, he returned to presenting Morning News and Sport In January 2012, Greeley confirmed his decision to retire from radio broadcasting to concentrate more on voice imaging.

Preceded by Michelle Rocca and Ronan Collins	Eurovision Song Contest Ireland Commentator (with Clíona Ní Bhuachalla); 1990	Succeeded by Pat Kenny
