= 6CK =

- Cork; Ireland
- Frequencies: 749 kHz, 1337 kHz

Programming
- Languages: English, Irish

Ownership
- Owner: Department of Posts & Telegraphs

History
- First air date: 25 April 1927
- Last air date: September 1930

Technical information
- Power: 1 kW or 1.5 kW
- Transmitter coordinates: 51°53′58″N 8°29′58″W

6CK was the first official radio station in Cork, Ireland and formed part of the national radio service of the Irish Free State. The station was set up in 1927 as an expansion of 2RN, the national station established in Dublin the previous year. It aired on medium wave, initially on the 400-metre band (749 kHz); on 15 January 1929 it switched to 222 metres (1350 kHz) and on 10 June of that year switched to 224 metres (1337 kHz).

6CK operated primarily as a local relay for 2RN as the signal from that station was too weak to be heard in Cork without much difficulty. However the station also had its own programmes and made a significant input to the national service. The station was initiated by J. J. Walsh who was Minister for Posts and Telegraphs of the Irish Free State and was responsible for broadcasting, having launched the first station, 2RN, the previous year. Walsh had been a local TD for Cork Borough and this may have influenced his decision to set up a second station in Cork.

The station operated as 6CK for just under three years when, in September 1930, it was subsumed into the national network which later became "Radio Éireann" and eventually Raidió Teilifís Éireann (RTÉ). However the studios continued to produce a considerable amount of material for the national service and the transmitter continued as a local relay for many years.

The studios of 6CK were in a section of the old Cork City Gaol in Sundays Well. The prison had only been recently vacated, having been used as an overflow prison for political prisoners at the end of the Irish War of Independence.

== See also ==
- RTÉ Radio Cork
