= RTÉ Digital Radio Sport =

Irish digital radio station

Ireland
- Broadcast area: National – Ireland
- Frequency: DAB: Mux 1

Programming
- Format: Rolling Sports News

Ownership
- Owner: Raidió Teilifís Éireann (RTÉ)

History
- First air date: Late Summer 2007

RTÉ Digital Radio Sport was a short-lived Irish radio station broadcasting on DAB only, as part of Raidió Teilifís Éireann (RTÉ)'s digital radio lineup. It played constant rolling sports news in a loop and also carried live sports broadcasts that would generally have been carried on AM services. These were moved to RTÉ Radio 1 Extra in April 2008. The station was removed from DAB shortly afterwards to allow an additional service, RTÉ Pulse to launch without adversely affecting station bandwidth.
