= Millennium 88FM =

Irish radio service

Millennium 88FM was a temporary local radio service for Dublin, Ireland, operated by RTÉ from 1988 to April 1989 to mark 1988 at the year of the Dublin Millennium.

The station broadcast from studios at the GPO Arcade in Dublin from 7am to 6pm daily. The studio was a short distance from where the first Irish radio station 2RN had begun broadcasting on 1 January 1926.

Millennium 88FM broadcast on 88.0 MHz FM, and 1278 kHz (235 metres) on medium wave.

== Presenters ==
A number of well-known radio names passed through this station:

- Gareth O'Callaghan (2FM, Galway Bay FM and 4FM),
- Jimmy Greeley (RTÉ News, Radio 1, 2FM, 98FM and 4FM),
- Robbie Irwin (Century Radio, Radio Ireland/Today FM, 2FM and RTÉ Sports and RTÉ Gold,)
- Declan Meehan (RTÉ2, London's Capitol Radio, Century Radio, FM104, Today FM and East Coast FM),
- Mark Byrne (Century Radio, Atlantic 252, FM104, Radio Ireland/Today FM, 98FM, Lite FM/Q102 and 4FM),(now currently working as a pilot)
- Nails Mahoney, aka Brian McColl (2FM, Atlantic 252, Radio Ireland, 98FM, East Coast FM, 4FM and Q102),
- Scott Williams (2FM, Century Radio, Capital Radio/Rock104/FM104, Limerick's Live 95FM and Lite FM/Q102),
- Andrew Hanlon (TV3 Head of News)
- Al Dunne (Atlantic 252, Lite FM/Q102, 4FM and RTÉ Gold)
- Maxi (RTÉ Radio 1)
- Theresa Lowe (RTÉ TV)
- Brian Jennings (RTÉ News)
