= RTÉ Choice =

Irish digital radio station

Ireland
- Broadcast area: National - Ireland
- Frequencies: DAB: Mux 1 UPC Ireland: Channel 941; Saorview: 207

Programming
- Format: Talk
- Affiliations: World Radio Network

Ownership
- Owner: Raidió Teilifís Éireann (RTÉ)
- Sister stations: RTÉ Radio 1

History
- First air date: 2007
- Last air date: 2013

RTÉ Choice was a digital radio station of the Irish public-service broadcaster Raidió Teilifís Éireann (RTÉ), made specifically for talk-radio. RTÉ realigned their digital radio services in 2013 and much of the content on RTÉ Choice began broadcasting on RTÉ Radio 1 Extra, by May 2013 both channels were simulcasts of one another. RTÉ Choice has since ceased broadcasting.

== History ==
Initially the broadcaster placed the station on the digital terrestrial television trial service in late October 2007. Along with five other new digital stations, RTÉ Choice was launched on 1 December 2008. It broadcast comedy shows, documentaries, vintage shows, music, and international programming sourced either from RTÉ's own broadcasts or via the World Radio Network from providers such as BBC World Service, National Public Radio and Radio Netherlands Worldwide.

The channel was also available on Saorview Ireland's free to air DTT service.

== Closure ==
RTÉ's five-year plan submitted to the Broadcasting Authority of Ireland outlined a number of changes that RTÉ has in mind for their digital radio services. The first to be addressed was the axing of RTÉ Choice radio in favour of a more talk based RTÉ Radio 1 Extra. RTÉ's five-year plan also outlines proposals to looking into part-time service RTÉ Chill and RTÉ Gold.
