= RTÉ Chill =

- Ireland
- Broadcast area: National - Ireland
- Frequencies: Saorview: Channel 207 & 209; Virgin Media: Channel 942

Programming
- Format: Music

Ownership
- Owner: Raidió Teilifís Éireann (RTÉ)
- Sister stations: RTÉ Radio 1 RTÉ 2fm RTÉ lyric fm RTÉ Raidió na Gaeltachta; RTÉ Pulse; RTÉ 2XM; RTÉ Jr Radio; RTÉ Gold; RTÉ Radio 1 Extra

History
- First air date: March 2008 (Officially launched 1 December 2008)
- Last air date: 31 December 2025

RTÉ Chill was a digital radio station of the Irish public-service broadcaster Raidió Teilifís Éireann (RTÉ). It broadcast mostly chillout and ambient music as well as other low-tempo genres and typically features the output of such cutting-edge artists as Leftfield, The Orb, Sigur Rós, and Juana Molina.

It started broadcasting in March 2008, but had an official launch alongside its sister services on 1 December 2008. The station, which timeshares with RTÉjr Radio is on air between 21:00 and 7:00, and is available on channel 207 on Saorview, Ireland's free-to-air Digital Terrestrial Television service.

On 6 November 2019, RTÉ management announced that, as part of a major cost-saving program, all its digital radio stations would be closed, including RTÉ Chill. In March 2021, it was announced that the station would remain on air via Saorview, cable and online streaming, but the DAB network would close at the end of the month.

In November 2025, it was announced that Chill's last broadcast day would be 31 December.
