= RTÉ Jr Radio =

RTÉjr Radio
- Ireland
- Frequencies: DAB: Mux 1 Saorview: Channel 207; Virgin Media: Channel 942

Programming
- Format: Children's Music

Ownership
- Owner: Raidió Teilifís Éireann (RTÉ)
- Sister stations: RTÉ Radio 1; RTÉ 2fm; RTÉ lyric fm; RTÉ Raidió na Gaeltachta; RTÉ Pulse; RTÉ 2XM; RTÉ Chill; RTÉ Gold; RTÉ Radio 1 Extra

History
- First air date: 1 May 2007 (Officially launched 31 December 2008)
- Last air date: 31 December 2025

Links
- Webcast: WMA, Real
- Website: rte.ie/digitalradio/rtejr

RTÉjr Radio was a children's digital radio station of the Irish public-service broadcaster Raidió Teilifís Éireann. It was Ireland's first children's oriented radio station with a wide variety of programming from news, poetry, nursery rhymes, storytelling, dramas and more. The station broadcast daily between 7:00 and 21:00 (time-sharing the DAB slot with RTÉ Chill) on DAB and Saorview in Ireland and globally through the RTÉ Radio Player.

The radio station is complemented by the RTÉjr television channel available on Saorview, Virgin Media Ireland, eVision, Aer TV and Sky Ireland.

On 6 November 2019, RTÉ management announced that, as part of a major cost-saving program, all its digital radio stations would be closed, including RTÉjr Radio. However on 2 March 2021 it was revealed by RTÉ that the broadcaster would close its DAB radio network while retaining its digital radio services.

On 16 November 2023, RTÉ announced the closure of most of its digital-only services, including RTÉjr Radio, in 2024, as part of the broadcaster's 'New Direction' internal restructuring.

In November 2025, it was announced that RTÉjr Radio's last broadcast day would be 31 December.
