= RTÉ 2XM =

- Ireland
- Broadcast area: National - Ireland
- Frequencies: RTÉ.ie; RTÉ Radio App; Saorview: Channel 206; Virgin Media: Channel 944

Programming
- Format: Alternative rock

Ownership
- Owner: Raidió Teilifís Éireann (RTÉ)
- Sister stations: RTÉ Radio 1 RTÉ 2fm RTÉ lyric fm RTÉ Raidió na Gaeltachta; RTÉ Pulse; RTÉ Jr Radio; RTÉ Chill; RTÉ Gold; RTÉ Radio 1 Extra

History
- First air date: March 2007 (trial); 1 December 2008 (launch)
- Last air date: 31 December 2025

Links
- Webcast: WMA, Real
- Website: www.rte.ie/2xm

RTÉ 2XM (stylised as "RTE 2><M") was a digital radio service of the Irish public broadcaster Raidió Teilifís Éireann (RTÉ), and a sister service to its national youth-orientated radio station RTÉ 2fm, broadly dedicated to alternative and independent music.

The service was available nationally on Saorview, Ireland's free-to-air Digital Terrestrial Television service, as well as the RTÉ website, the RTÉ Radio App, Virgin Media television, and other online apps and services.

== History ==
Created and originally edited by former RTÉ radio programming director Mark McCabe, RTÉ 2XM debuted in March 2007, broadcasting on a limited Digital Audio Broadcasting service for the Greater Dublin and North East Coast areas, as part of the broadcaster's digital radio trial.

RTÉ placed the station on the digital terrestrial television trial service in late October 2007, and on its website in late June 2008.

The station was initially intended to carry a selection of live music with content from festivals across Europe. It was the first RTÉ digital radio station to have carried live content, with music from the Oxegen festival in July 2007, and the Electric Picnic and PlanetLove Summer Session festivals in September 2007, as well as the PlanetLove Winter Session in February 2008.

The station ventured into online video content with 2XM WebTV, debuting during RTÉ's coverage of the Oxegen 2008 music festival, on the weekend of 11–14 July 2008

Along with five other new digital stations, RTÉ 2XM was formally launched on RTÉ's national Digital Audio Broadcasting service on 1 December 2008.

The station has also been available on the Saorview digital terrestrial television service since its official launch in 2011, including areas of Northern Ireland where overspill signal from the Republic of Ireland can be received. Alongside its digital sister stations, it switched multiplexes on the service in July of 2023.

== Programming and audience ==
The station plays a broad range of music, including rock, indie, metal, pop-punk, electronica, alternative and nu-metal, as well as a focus on playing music from homegrown artists in Ireland.

Over the years, the station has featured regular programming from RTÉ staff and freelance presenters drawn from Ireland's music communities and industry, as well as internationally-syndicated content.

Most of the station's first-run output is broadcast on evenings and weekends, with much of the broadcasting day occupied by genre-oriented playlisting. The main exception is the station's long-term flagship show, The Alternative, first broadcast by presenter Dan Hegarty on weekday afternoons on the service, before being relayed on its regular night-time slot on the main 2FM station.

As the Digital Audio Broadcasting standard failed to garner a commercial foothold in Ireland in the late 2000s and early 2010s, 2XM and its sister stations were gradually retooled to accommodate a specialist music audience, in keeping with the broadcaster's public-service remit.

The station has also provided airtime for music documentaries, special programmes, and themed live broadcasts across its existing platforms during its lifetime, as well as informally acting as a 'developmental' platform for RTÉ radio talent and staff.

== Closure ==
On 6 November 2019, RTÉ management announced that, as part of a major cost-saving programme, all its digital radio stations would be closed, including RTÉ 2XM.

On 2 March 2021, however, it was revealed by the broadcaster that it would only close its DAB radio network, retaining its digital radio services, including 2XM, via the RTÉ Radio App, RTE.ie and audio streams on the Saorview and Virgin Media television services.

On 16 November 2023, RTÉ announced the closure of most of its digital-only services, including 2XM, in 2024, as part of the broadcaster's 'New Direction' internal restructuring.

As part of the announcement, the broadcaster confirmed its intention to carry on-demand programming and playlists on future revisions of its Radio App to fulfill the stations' respective remits.

In November 2025, it was announced that 2XM's last broadcast day would be 31 December.

== Current presenters ==
- AILSHA — Amplify
- Alister Dowey — The Bunker, Emo Anthems
- Dan Hegarty — The Alternative
- Dermot Lambert — Garageland
- Dudley Colley — Click Clack
- Handsome Paddy — No Static
- Jim O'Donoghue-Martin — Spinning Away
- John Kenny — The JK Experience
- Kate Brennan-Harding — The Kate Brennan-Harding Show
- Laura-Lee Conboy — Shadowplay
- Mike McGrath-Bryan — Raidío Mar Dhea
- Nessy Monaghan — The London Ear
- Pat McGrath — C60
- Peter Curtin — Groovers Corner
- Rachel Mae Hannon — Relish

== Current syndicated shows ==
- Dave Clarke — The SAGA
- Sat Bisla — Passport Approved
- Sian Eleri — Selector Radio

== Current playlisting and playout blocks ==
- 2XM Chillwavey (electronic, ambient)
- 2XM Rocks (rock, indie, pop)
- Breakin' and Shakin' (new releases)
- Jamrock on 2XM (reggae and roots)
- This Party Rocks (general-interest playout)
- XtraLive (live music)
- Yo! 2XM Raps (hip-hop)

== Former presenters ==
- Aidan Cuffe — The Fourcast
- Aidan Kelly — The Bluffer's Guide
- Alan Taylor — In-D Mix
- Aoife Barry — Sweet Oblivion
- Aoife McElwain — Right Click Radio
- Andrew Bass — Sessions from Oblivion
- Barry Bracken — Wired for Sound
- Carl Mullan — various shows
- Ciarán Ryan — music documentaries
- Cian McCarthy — Needs More Cowbell
- Chris Morrin — Robotnik's Random Rampage, RAW Radio
- Ciaran McCarthy — The Suburban Dream
- Claire O'Dowd — Making Waves
- Cormac Battle — self-titled show
- Danny Carroll — Two States
- Darren Cleary — In Colour
- Dave Fanning — The 11th Hour
- DJ Laz-E — Plastic Attack
- Donal Dineen — Radioactivity
- Eamon Carey — Hard Working Class Heroes coverage
- Edel Coffey — Electric Honey
- Eric Davidson — self-titled show
- Gaz LeRock — Loving Room Floor
- Gavin Morrison — Through the Looking Glass
- Gemma Bradley — Seconds Away
- Graham Smyth — Painted Flowers
- Greg Spring — The Pig's Ear
- Jacqui Carroll — Ready Steady Go!
- Jan Ní Fhlanagáin — Wired for Sound
- James Hendicott — GoldenPlec Select
- James Keating — The Soundtrack
- John Bela Reilly — Undercurrents
- John Connolly — ABC to XTC
- John Kelly — Radio Clash
- John Kenny — The John Kenny Heavy Metal Show
- Keiron Black — The King Kong Club
- Keith Brett — Needs More Cowbell
- Lauren Murphy — Wired for Sound
- Mark McCabe — various shows
- Mike McGrath-Bryan — occasional cover
- Mixen Vixen — In-D Mix
- Nessy Monaghan — Culture Café
- Niamh Hegarty — New Noise
- Ola Majekodunmi — Unheard
- Paddy McKenna — Dance Monkey Dance
- Paul McDermott — music documentaries
- Paula Flynn — The C-Word
- Pauline Freeman — BalconyTV Radio Hour
- Rachel Jordan — DIY Records
- Richie Chakra — Making Waves
- Rick O'Shea — Rick Does Rock
- Rory Dungan — Making Waves
- Russell Simmons — The Pig's Ear
- Sean Conroy — Two States
- Seán Ó Cuireáin — Dreamland
- Simon Mulcahy — self-titled show
- Stephen Byrne — The Fourcast
- Stephen O'Regan — BalconyTV Radio Hour
- Steven Battle — Sabotage
- Tara Kumar — Pop Tarts
- Tom Millett — BalconyTV Radio Hour

== Former syndicated shows ==
- David Brown — Texas Music Matters
- Gilles Peterson — Worldwide
- Nic Harcourt — Sounds Eclectic

== Former playlists and playout blocks ==
- 2XM Sessions (session performances from the RTÉ archives)
- 2XM Unplugged (acoustic songs and performances)
- TGIF on 2XM (general alternative rock playout)
