= RTÉ Radio Cork =

- Cork, Ireland; Ireland
- Frequencies: 89.2 MHz and 729 kHz

Programming
- Languages: English; Irish; Albanian
- Format: Varied

Ownership
- Owner: RTÉ

History
- First air date: March 2, 1974; 52 years ago
- Last air date: January 2000; 26 years ago
- Former names: RTÉ Cork Local Radio (1974–1989); Cork 89FM (1989–1994)

Technical information
- ERP: 10 kW
- Transmitter coordinates: 51.895979°N 8.468332°W

RTÉ Radio Cork, also known as RTÉ Cork Local Radio and Cork 89FM, was a local radio station in the Republic of Ireland serving Cork City. The FM signal spilled into Ballincollig and Carrigaline, but the rest of County Cork had to rely on the medium wave signal. It was shut down in 2000.

== History ==
Radio broadcasting in Cork began in 1927 with 6CK, which operated primarily as a local relay for the Dublin-based 2RN, but also produced some of its own content.

RTÉ Cork Local Radio was established on 2 March 1974 as an opt-out service which operated for a limited number of hours per week, relaying the national service (RTÉ Radio 1) at other times. The service was popular but had its hands tied by the limited number of local hours it could output, before reverting the Dublin feed.

In 1989, RTÉ Cork Local Radio was rebranded as "Cork 89FM." It became "RTÉ Radio Cork" in 1994, and was closed in 2000 due to low audience share.

== Programmes ==
One of the most prominent broadcasts was the soap opera Under the Goldie Fish. The title referred to the gilded fish which acts as a weather vane atop the Church of St Anne, Shandon.

== Other people ==
- Mark Cagney
- Michael Corcoran
- Vincent Hanley
- Alf McCarthy
- Marty Morrissey
- Tony O'Donoghue
- Donna O'Sullivan
- Lillian Smith

== See also ==
- 6CK
