= RTÉ Digital Radio News =

- Ireland
- Broadcast area: Ireland
- Frequencies: DAB: Mux 1 (parts of Counties Cork, Dublin, Kildare, Limerick, Louth and Meath); Online (Worldwide)

Programming
- Format: Rolling news

Ownership
- Owner: Raidió Teilifís Éireann

History
- First air date: 30 May 2007; 19 years ago
- Last air date: 30 November 2008; 17 years ago

RTÉ Digital Radio News was a digital radio (DAB) station from the Irish state broadcaster, RTÉ. It began broadcasting on 30 May 2007, and was launched as part of an expansion of RTÉ's digital radio network, which now contains five digital-only stations, as well as four FM stations.

The channel broadcast the latest RTÉ Radio 1 news bulletin live, at the top of each hour, and then played this on loop until the next Radio 1 update. The station also played audio from RTÉ television's main news programmes, RTÉ News: Six One and RTÉ News: Nine O'Clock.

On 12 June 2008, RTÉ launched RTÉ News Now, (now simply called RTÉ News) which operates along the same principle as RTÉ Digital Radio News, in that it streams the most recent television news bulletin from RTÉ Television, through the RTÉ.ie website and the RTÉ News channel on Saorview

== Availability ==
Like all of RTÉ's radio stations, RTÉ Digital Radio News was available through the RTÉ.ie website from anywhere in the world. The channel was also available in Ireland on the DAB system, however this will not be nationally accessible until 2009 and currently only covers parts of Counties Cork, Dublin, Kildare, Limerick, Louth and Meath.

== Closure ==
The station was not included in the list of permanent digital radio services to be launched by RTÉ on 1 December 2008,, and ceased broadcasting on 30 November 2008. RTÉ News, the television equivalent, continues to operate however.

== See also ==
- Newstalk
- RTÉ News Now
