= RTÉ Radio 1 Extra =

- Ireland
- Broadcast area: Ireland (nationwide); Worldwide
- Frequencies: Saorview: Channel 201; Virgin Media: Channel 940

Programming
- Format: Intelligent speech

Ownership
- Owner: Raidió Teilifís Éireann (RTÉ)
- Sister stations: RTÉ Radio 1 RTÉ 2fm RTÉ lyric fm RTÉ Raidió na Gaeltachta; RTÉ Pulse; RTÉ 2XM; RTÉ Jr Radio; RTÉ Chill; RTÉ Gold

History
- First air date: 1 December 2008 (as RTÉ Choice)
- Last air date: 31 December 2025

Links
- Webcast: m3u
- Website: RTÉ Radio 1 Extra

RTÉ Radio 1 Extra was a digital radio station produced by the Irish public-service broadcasting service Raidió Teilifís Éireann (RTÉ).

== History ==
Initially launched on 1 December 2008 as RTÉ Choice alongside five other new digital channels – with one of which, also called RTÉ Radio 1 Extra but differently formatted (see below), it was merged in May 2013 – the channel offers a continuous service of what it describes as "quality speech from home and abroad". This is made up of programming from international English-language broadcasters such as the BBC, NPR, and a number of others, together with time-shifted elements from the schedule of RTÉ's flagship station RTÉ Radio 1, plus those variations from the main Radio 1 FM schedule (chiefly church services on Sunday mornings and extended live coverage of sporting events) which are currently broadcast on Radio 1's longwave (LW) frequency. If Radio 1's LW service is withdrawn, these special programmes will be available only on Radio 1 Extra.

On 6 November 2019, RTÉ management announced that, as part of a major cost-saving program, all its digital radio stations would be closed, including RTÉ Radio 1 Extra. However, on 2 March 2021 it was revealed by RTÉ that the broadcaster would close its DAB radio network while retaining its digital radio services, including RTÉ Radio 1 Extra.

The channel repeated RTÉ Radio 1's epic 30-hour broadcast of the full text of James Joyce's novel Ulysses for the first time in 38 years on 16 June 2020, beginning at 8 am. The decision to repeat the broadcast was partly influenced by the quarantine introduced in Ireland to limit the spread of the COVID-19 virus.

On 1 March 2025, RTÉ Radio 1 Extra ceased rebroadcasting most foreign content and mostly reverted to the original programming model that preceded the merger with RTÉ Choice.

In November 2025, it was announced that Radio 1 Extra's last broadcast day would be 31 December.

== Earlier incarnation ==
From December 2008 until May 2013 the name RTÉ Radio 1 Extra referred to what was essentially a digital relay of the whole of RTÉ Radio 1's LW schedule (that is to say, the RTÉ Radio 1 FM schedule with variations for religious and sports programming). Until January 2013 this service was also available in the UK from the Astra 28.2°E satellite.

An official report into future broadcasting policy, published by RTÉ in January 2013, recommended the merger of RTÉ Choice and RTÉ Radio 1 Extra, and this was duly effected in May 2013 with the merged channel carrying the name RTÉ Radio 1 Extra although chiefly continuing the programming content of RTÉ Choice.

As of 1 March 2025, RTÉ Radio 1 Extra seems to have reverted to this model of programming.

== See also ==
- RTÉ Radio
