= RTÉ Gold =

- Ireland
- Broadcast area: National - Ireland
- Frequencies: DAB+: 5B, 7A, 7C, 8C, 10D, 11B FáilteDAB; Saorview: Channel 208; Virgin Media: Channel 941

Programming
- Format: Classic hits, Adult contemporary

Ownership
- Owner: Raidió Teilifís Éireann
- Sister stations: RTÉ Radio 1 RTÉ 2fm RTÉ lyric fm RTÉ Raidió na Gaeltachta

History
- First air date: 30 May 2007 (Officially launched 1 December 2008)

Links
- Website: www.rte.ie/radio/gold/

RTÉ Gold is an Irish radio station broadcasting on DAB+, Saorview, online, and via the Virgin Media cable network. The station is also available via IPTV through vodafone TV and eir TV.

== Background ==
The station plays music from the 1960s to the 2000s.

Weekday programming has presenter led programmes from 7am - 6pm. At weekends there is a full presenter led schedule from 8am to 8pm.

On 6 November 2017, presented weekday breakfast and drivetime programmes were introduced, hosted by RTÉ radio presenters Will Leahy and Rick Ó Shea.

On 6 November 2019, RTÉ management announced that, as part of a major cost-saving programme, all its digital radio stations would be closed, including RTÉ Gold. In March 2021, it was announced that the station would remain on air via Saorview, cable and online streaming, but the DAB network would close at the end of the month.

As of 1 January 2026, it became the last RTÉ-owned digital radio station still in existence after the closure of RTÉ Pulse, RTÉ 2XM, RTÉ Jr Radio (timeshared with RTÉ Chill), and RTÉ Radio 1 Extra.

On 15 June 2026, RTÉ Gold joined the FáilteDAB DAB+ trial on both ensembles. It is now available via DAB+ in "80%” of the Irish population according to FáilteDAB.
