= Digital radio in the Republic of Ireland =

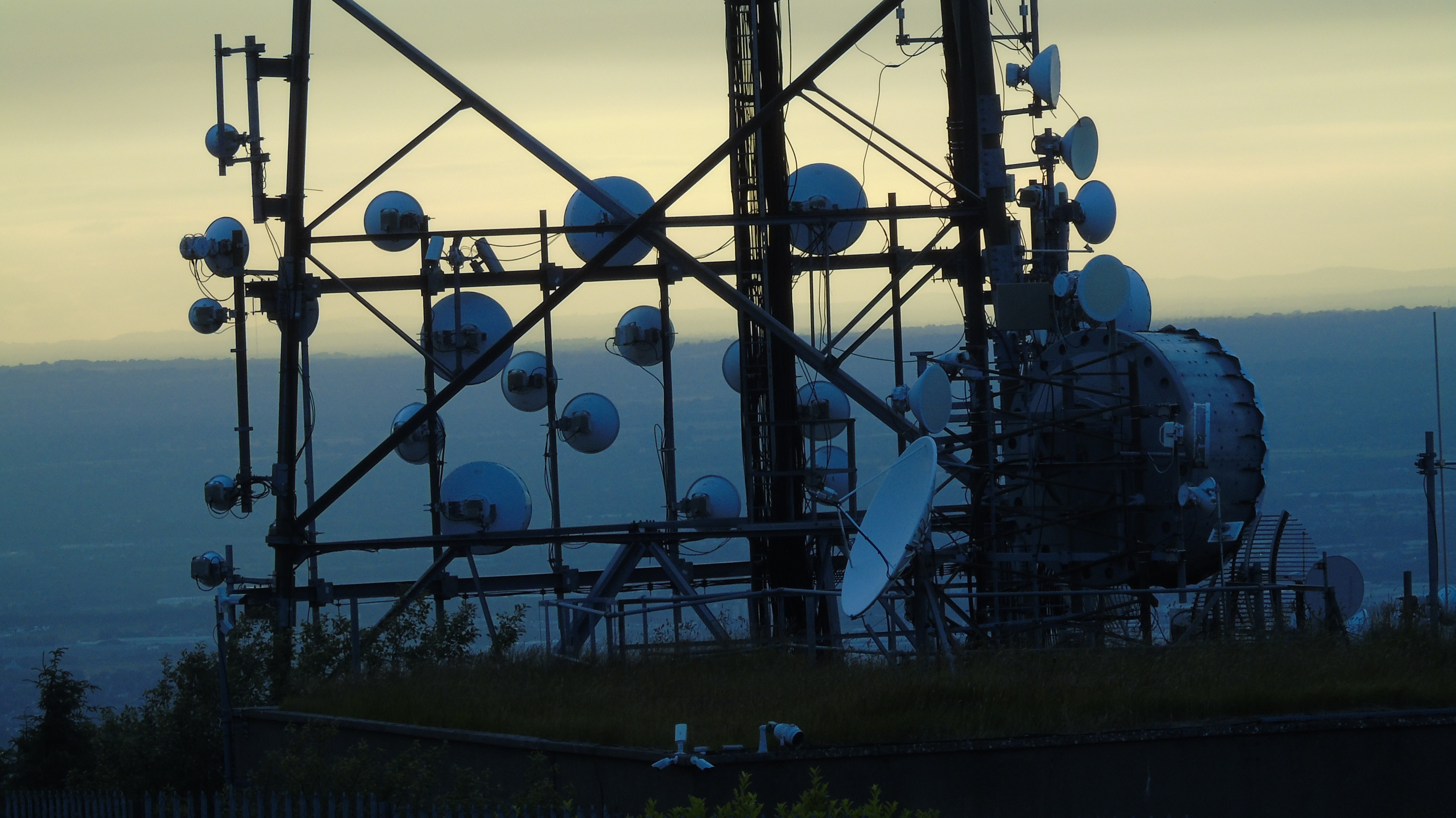
Digital radio services are broadcast from sites such as Three Rock Mountain (pictured)

Digital radio in the Republic of Ireland is currently broadcast on DAB+ and a number of digital terrestrial, cable and internet platforms.

Until 31 March 2021, official broadcasts of the full complement of radio services of Raidió Teilifís Éireann (RTÉ) using the DAB standard were available in the state. (Note: See § DAB Ireland Mux1 (RTÉ - 2006 to 2021))

In April 2025, a twelve-month DAB+ trial covering Dublin and the wider Leinster area was launched by FáilteDAB with the support of Coimisiún na Meán and ComReg. In January 2026, it was announced that beginning in April, the trial would be extended for a further 12 months and expanded beyond the original area to cover more than 85% of the population. (Note: See § FáilteDAB)

== Digital Audio Broadcasting ==
Until 31 March 2021, the national public service broadcaster, RTÉ, operated a full-service DAB multiplex across a five transmitter network covering all major population centres and a total 52% of the population of the state.

Following the end of its DAB transmissions, RTÉ's digital stations – RTÉ Gold, RTÉ 2XM, RTÉ Radio 1 Extra, RTÉ Pulse, and RTÉjr Radio – which were originally created for the DAB network, remained available on Saorview and online. In November 2019, and again in November 2023, RTÉ announced that these stations (except RTÉ Gold) would be closed in order to reduce costs; they were finally closed on 31 December 2025.

Prior to this, a number of national multiplexes in the republic have ceased transmissions. A small number of unlicensed low-powered, small-scale DAB multiplexes did run in the state after the cessation of the RTÉ DAB multiplex, but they had all ceased by the summer of 2024.

Some areas near the border with Northern Ireland can receive overspill of BBC Radio Ulster and BBC Radio Foyle.

=== FáilteDAB ===
In February 2025, a new DAB+ service operated by FáilteDAB was granted a licence by ComReg to commence a one-year trial starting in April for a multiplex that will cover six transmitter sites across the eastern part of the republic with the view to expand nationally during the trial period.

The trial is supported by Ireland's media regulator Coimisiún na Meán.

Prior to its launch, both Wireless Ireland and Bauer Media Audio Ireland announced plans to operate services on the platform.

In January 2026, it was announced that beginning in April, the trial would be extended for a further 12 months and expanded beyond the original area to cover more than 85% of the population.

Transmitter Details (2026)
Site	Frequency	Service
Louth (Collon/Mount Oriel)	5B	Mux 1
Dublin (Balbriggan)	7C	Mux 1
Dublin (Three Rock)	7C	Mux 1
Dublin (Saggart)	7C	Mux 1
Wicklow (Bray)	7C	Mux 1
Wicklow Head/Ballyguile	7C	Mux 1
Cork (Bweeng)	7A	Mux 2
Cork (Farmers Cross)	7A	Mux 2
Longford (Ardagh)	8C	Mux 2
Wexford (White Mountain)	9B	Mux 2
Tipperary (Keeper Hill)	10D	Mux 2
Galway (Abbeynnockmoy)	11B	Mux 2
Galway (Tonabrocky)	11B	Mux 2
Mayo (Kiltimagh)	11B	Mux 2

=== Services on Fáilte DAB ===
Service Details (2026)
	Service	Bitrate (Mux 1)	Bitrate (Mux 2)	Format	Programme Type
1	all Classical	40 kbit/s	Mux 1 Only	Parametric Stereo	Classical Music
2	BOB FM	32 kbit/s	32 kbit/s	Stereo	Other Music
3	Dublin's Q102	48 kbit/s	Mux 1 only	Parametric Stereo	Oldies
4	Energy Dance	40 kbit/s	32 kbit/s	Parametric Stereo	Dance Music
5	Freedom	32 kbit/s	32 kbit/s	Parametric Stereo	Pop Music
6	GHR	48 kbit/s	48 kbit/s	Parametric Stereo	Oldies
7	GoLoud	40 kbit/s	48 kbit/s	Parametric Stereo	Other Music
8	Gravity Hits	32 kbit/s	32 kbit/s	Parametric Stereo	Other Music
9	LazerHits	32 kbit/s	32 kbit/s	Parametric Stereo	Other Music
10	Newstalk	56 kbit/s	32 kbit/s	Parametric Stereo	News
11	Nova	48 kbit/s	48 kbit/s	Parametric Stereo	Rock Music
12	NovaClassicRock	40 kbit/s	Mux 1 Only	Parametric Stereo	Rock Music
13	Onic Alt	40 kbit/s	Mux 1 Only	Parametric Stereo	Alternative Rock
14	Onic Country	40 kbit/s	32 kbit/s	Parametric Stereo	Country Music
15	Onic Hits	40 kbit/s	32 kbit/s	Parametric Stereo	Pop Music
16	Onic Kids	32 kbit/s	Mux 1 Only	Parametric Stereo	Children's Progs
17	Onic Pride Vibes	40 kbit/s	32 kbit/s	Parametric Stereo	LGBT
18	Onic 80s	40 kbit/s	32 kbit/s	Parametric Stereo	1980's Music
19	Onic 90s	40 kbit/s	32 kbit/s	Parametric Stereo	1990's Music
20	Radio Maria	24 kbit/s	24 kbit/s	Mono	Religion
21	RNL Raidió na Life	32 kbit/s	32 kbit/s	Stereo	Irish Language
22	Raidió Rí-Rá	32 kbit/s	32 kbit/s	Stereo	Irish Language
23	Rewind	40 kbit/s	32 kbit/s	Parametric Stereo	Oldies
24	SPIN K-POP	48 kbit/s	Mux 1 Only	Parametric Stereo	Korean Pop
25	SPIN 1038	48 kbit/s	32 kbit/s	Parametric Stereo	Pop Music
26	Spirit Radio	32 kbit/s	Mux 1 Only	Parametric Stereo	Religion
27	Sunshine Soul	40 kbit/s	24 kbit/s	Parametric Stereo	Easy Listening
28	UCB Ireland	24 kbit/s	24 kbit/s	Mono	Religion
29	Velvet Sounds	32 kbit/s	32 kbit/s	Parametric Stereo	Easy Listening
30	3FM	32 kbit/s	Mux 1 Only	Parametric Stereo	No PTy
31	8Radio	32 kbit/s	Mux 1 Only	Parametric Stereo	Alternative Rock Music
32	Classic Hits	Mux 2 Only	32 kbit/s	Parametric Stereo	Oldies
33	Today FM Country Hits	Mux 2 Only	48 kbit/s	Parametric Stereo	Country Music
34	Sunshine	Mux 2 Only	32 kbit/s	Parametric Stereo	Easy Listening
35	Pure Country	Mux 2 Only	32 kbit/s	Parametric Stereo	Country Music

=== Former National Multiplexes ===
==== DAB Ireland Mux1 (RTÉ - 2006 to 2021) ====
The first national public service multiplex operated on Block 12C (227.360 MHz) by RTÉ from just five transmitters: Three Rock, County Dublin; Kippure, Co. Wicklow; Clermont Carn, Co. Louth; Spur Hill, Co. Cork; and Woodcock Hill, Co. Limerick. Hence the service was only available in parts of Ireland. Its line-up varied considerably since its launch on 1 January 2006. All stations were provided by RTÉ. It carried the following stations:

- RTÉ Radio 1, 128 kbit/s Stereo
- RTÉ Radio 1 Extra, 64 kbit/s Mono (part-time service, used bandwidth from Chill)
- RTÉ 2fm, 128 kbit/s Stereo
- RTÉ lyric fm, 160 kbit/s Stereo
- RTÉ Raidió na Gaeltachta, 112 kbit/s Stereo
- RTÉ Gold, 128 kbit/s Stereo
- RTÉ 2XM, 128 kbit/s Stereo
- RTÉ Junior, 128 kbit/s Stereo (07:00-21:00, timeshared a slot with RTÉ Chill). Drops to 96 kbit/s Mono when required
- RTÉ Chill, 128 kbit/s Stereo (21:00-07:00, timeshared a slot with RTÉ Junior). Drops to 96 kbit/s Mono when required
- RTÉ Pulse, 128 kbit/s Stereo.

It was proposed to close the RTÉ DAB service as well as the digital-only RTÉ radio stations as part of the November 2019 cost saving plan. This proposed closure was set to take place in April 2020 but was delayed pending review through the outcome of a commissioned report.

In March 2021, RTÉ announced that it was to cease transmission of its radio services on the Digital Audio Broadcast (DAB) network on 31 March 2021. A report commissioned by the broadcaster found that just 0.5% of adults in Ireland listened to radio via DAB while 77% of adults in Ireland listened on FM.

==== DAB Ireland Mux2 (2007–08) ====
No longer operating since November 2008, this multiplex launched in mid-March 2007 and operated from Three Rock Mountain and Clermont Carn on Block 12A (223.936 MHz). It carried ten services: four stations supplied by Communicorp, two by Digital Audio Productions, two by UTV Radio, and two privately held. As of July 2008, it consisted of:

- All 80s, 128 kbit/s Stereo
- Dublin's 98FM, 128 kbit/s Stereo
- FM104, 128 kbit/s Stereo
- Mocha, 128 kbit/s Stereo
- Newstalk, 64 kbit/s Mono
- Phantom FM, 128 kbit/s Stereo
- Q102, 128 kbit/s Stereo
- Radio Kerry, 96 kbit/s Mono
- Today FM, 128 kbit/s Stereo
- SPIN 1038, 128 kbit/s Stereo
- Raidió Rí-Rá

Radio stations licensed by the Broadcasting Commission of Ireland ceased broadcasting on Ireland's second digital radio multiplex (Mux 2) on Sunday, 30 November 2008. The stations were broadcasting on Mux 2 as part of a digital radio trial.ComReg and the Broadcasting Authority of Ireland are currently exploring regulatory frameworks for digital radio multiplex licensing and broadcast licences.

=== DB Digital Broadcasting (2012–2017) ===
DB Digital Broadcasting launched a national multiplex in some areas of Ireland in July 2012. Plans to expand to Limerick were dropped in 2014. The multiplex closed on 30 June 2017 due to a lack of enthusiasm for DAB from the commercial sector and after its licence from ComReg expired. The operator was attempting to relaunch a national service after the announcement of the closure of the first national multiplex.

=== Former Trial Multiplexes ===
DAB was launched to the public on 30 November 2006, with a number of trials taking place in 1998, 2001 and 2006. Before April 2021, 52% of Ireland's population — mainly in Counties Cork and Limerick and the North East – could receive permanent DAB services. Geographic coverage on a portable or car radio was much less. The service began to be marketed in May 2007 by a collective of commercial broadcasters, digitalradio.ie.

Since 2010, a number of privately run trial broadcasts have been made.

==== South-East (TOTAL-DAB) DAB trials (2010 to 2012) ====
DAB and DAB+ trials were begun in April 2010 in the South-East area of Ireland on channel 9B (204.64 MHz) by Total Broadcast Consultants Ltd, a broadcast engineering company. The company initially obtained a 1-year test and trial licence from ComReg to perform tests from sites, initially just in Waterford City. But from mid May, the trial multiplex was expanded to cover much of the South East of Ireland via a high site in the Blackstairs Mountains, providing coverage in Co. Wexford, Co. Carlow, Co. Kilkenny and East Co. Waterford. In March 2011, a 1-year extension was granted. This was the first DAB multiplex in Ireland to be operated by an independent/private organisation (RTÉ NL operating previous multiplexes), and the first known broadcasts of DAB+ content in Ireland. In addition to all local and regional radio stations, it was carrying several stations previously unavailable in the region. Past trial participants have included Christmas FM, Zenith Classic Rock & Raidió Rí-Rá.

- 4fm, 160 kbit/s Stereo
- Beat 102 103, 192 kbit/s Stereo
- Sunshine, 128 kbit/s Stereo
- KCLR 96FM, 48 kbit/s DAB+ Stereo
- Phantom FM, 128 kbit/s Stereo
- Radio Nova, 192 kbit/s Stereo
- RTÉ 2XM, 72 kbit/s DAB+ Stereo
- South East Radio, 88 kbit/s DAB+ Stereo
- Talksport, 56 kbit/s Mono
- Tipp FM, 56 kbit/s DAB+ Stereo
- UCB Ireland, 32 kbit/s AAC+
- WLR FM, 64 kbit/s AAC+ Stereo

==== Dublin 2018 trial ====
A test service in Dublin served parts of the city on Channels 5A and 5B carrying both RTÉ and Independent local radio services from both Dublin and Cork.

==== Cork City 2018–19 DAB Trial (éirdab) ====
A small scale DAB trial, launched in August 2018 in Cork City, Ireland on channel 11A (216.928 MHz). It was operated by Viamux Ltd (éirdab), a DAB/DAB+ digital radio solutions company. éirdab received a 1-year test and trial licence from Comreg to perform tests from a site in Cork City. éirdab has invited all local and regional radio stations to join the multiplex. It also carried stations previously unavailable to listeners in the area. Stations included:

- 8Radio
- Radio Maria, 128 kbit/s Stereo
- United Christian Broadcasters, 128 kbit/s Stereo
- Juice FM, 192 kbit/s Stereo

=== Former unlicensed DAB multiplexes ===
A small number of unlicensed independent DAB multiplexes were available in a few locations until the summer of 2024.

==== FreeDAB ====
The FreeDAB network carried a number of low-powered multiplexes in Cork, Dublin, the north and north east of Ireland and Sligo. The broadcaster was raided by the Garda in 2020 and resumed broadcasting in Cork, Dublin, Sligo, Waterford, Dundalk, Limerick. These transmissions have ceased.

== Digital Terrestrial Television ==
All of RTÉ's digital radio services, and the private radio service Radio Maria Ireland, are available on Saorview.

== Digital Satellite ==
A number RTÉ radio services are available nationwide on Saorsat, FreeSat and Sky.

== Internet Radio ==
A number of public and private radio services are available across the state from broadband internet and mobile phone networks receivable on smartphones, Internet radio devices and smart speakers.

== See also ==
- Radio in the Republic of Ireland
- List of radio stations in the Republic of Ireland
