= RTÉ Pulse =

- Ireland
- Broadcast area: National - Ireland
- Frequencies: Saorview: Channel 205; Virgin Media: Channel 943; Online

Programming
- Format: Electronic dance music

Ownership
- Owner: Raidió Teilifís Éireann (RTÉ)
- Sister stations: RTÉ Radio 1 RTÉ 2fm RTÉ lyric fm RTÉ Raidió na Gaeltachta; RTÉ 2XM; RTÉ Jr Radio; RTÉ Chill; RTÉ Gold; RTÉ Radio 1 Extra

History
- First air date: April 2008; 18 years ago
- Last air date: 31 December 2025

Links
- Website: RTÉ Pulse

RTÉ Pulse was an electronic dance music station from Raidió Teilifís Éireann (RTÉ), Ireland's national broadcaster. It played a varied mix of dance music, with a small number of shows covering R&B. It started broadcasting in April 2008, but had an official launch alongside its sister services on 1 December 2008.

It broadcast on Saorview, Ireland's free-to-air DTT service in Ireland, as well as on Virgin Media cable television and over the Internet. Until 31 March 2021, the service also broadcast on DAB via the RTÉ Multiplex 1.

== History ==
Originally started as a jukebox service with no presenters, it now carries daily live and pre-recorded shows from a number of Irish DJs, including Mo K, Orla Feeney and international DJs and brands like Ministry of Sound, Defected Records, Hed Kandi, Paul Oakenfold, Ferry Corsten, Carl Cox, Nicky Romero, Mark Knight, Judge Jules and Bingo Players.

Irish trade unions have announced they are supporting RTÉ Pulse's DJs in their push for pay equality at RTÉ. The management of RTÉ indicated that Pulse's presenters would be paid by the end of 2016. In September 2017, after this promised had not been kept, the NUJ publicly came out in support of DJs on RTÉ Pulse and the other digital radio stations at RTÉ.

On 6 November 2019, RTÉ management announced that, as part of a major cost-saving program, all its digital radio stations would be closed, including RTÉ Pulse. In March 2021, it was announced that the station would remain on air via Saorview, cable and online streaming, but the DAB network would close at the end of the month.

In November 2025, it was announced that Pulse's last broadcast day would be 31 December.

== Programming ==
The schedule was designed to be stranded in its approach to fulfilling its remit of representing all genres of dance music. It also aired specialist live shows such as: The Drop with Aifric O Connell, which plays the most blogged about and brand new music; Back2Basics, the all-vinyl show, presented by Simon Palmer, which is believed to be the only vinyl show aired by a state broadcaster globally; as well as content from the Red Bull Music Academy.

Sunday's scheduling drew very much from the eclectic styles of dance music and featured soul, dubstep, and drum and bass.

The station also did outside broadcasts, such as from the Life Festival in 2013, as well as airing music from many international live events during the Re-LIVE show.

The majority of broadcasts came from RTÉ main studios in Dublin; however, the service also used RTÉ facilities from all around the country and overseas. There were regular weekly live shows from the Cork, Limerick and Belfast studios. The service regularly broadcast live shows from the RTÉ or BBC studios in London, the latest being by singer-songwriter and producer Femmepop aka Margaret O'Sullivan who does two shows per month featuring only the best in underground female producers and DJs. Femmepop is based in London but originally hails from Cork.
