= RTÉ lyric fm =

Irish classical-music and arts radio station

- Limerick; Ireland
- Broadcast area: Republic of Ireland, Malta and Northern Ireland; Worldwide (mainly the United Kingdom on satellite)
- Frequencies: FM 96.7–99.6 (95.2 northeast) MHz; Digital terrestrial television DAB+: 6C Digi B (Malta)
- RDS: RTElyric

Programming
- Languages: English, Irish
- Format: Classical music, jazz, film music, and arts

Ownership
- Owner: Raidió Teilifís Éireann (RTÉ)
- Sister stations: RTÉ Radio 1 RTÉ 2fm RTÉ Raidió na Gaeltachta; RTÉ Gold

History
- First air date: 6 November 1984 (as FM3 Classical Music); 1 May 1999 (as Lyric FM)
- Former names: FM3 Classical Music (1984–1999)

Links
- Webcast: WMA, Real
- Website: rte.ie/lyricfm/

RTÉ Lyric FM (stylised as RTÉ lyric fm) is an Irish classical music, jazz and arts radio station, owned and operated by RTÉ. The station, which is based in Limerick, was launched in 1999 and is available on 96-99 FM throughout Ireland (in some areas also on DAB), on Sky Digital satellite in Ireland and the United Kingdom, and via the Internet worldwide.

As of 2025, RTÉ Lyric FM attracts a weekday audience share of 2.8%. The current head of the station is Sinéad Wylde.

== History ==
RTÉ Lyric FM developed from FM3 Classical Music, which began broadcasting on 6 November 1984. FM3 broadcast classical music on the RTÉ Raidió na Gaeltachta network at breakfast time, lunchtime and in the evenings. The station was rarely marketed, except via promotions on RTÉ Radio 1, and had low listenership ratings. It was probably best known for occasionally simulcasting the stereo soundtrack of movies being shown on the RTÉ television channels prior to RTÉ's deployment of NICAM digital stereo.

As Raidió na Gaeltachta expanded broadcast hours, FM3's service hours changed to 19:30–01:00 and 06:30–08:00. Eventually it stayed on air until breakfast time when RnaG resumed broadcasting.

On 1 May 1999, RTÉ put in place an additional national FM transmitter network, and it was decided to separate FM3 from Radio na Gaeltachta, and expand its remit to include other types of minority music. The resulting station was Lyric FM (currently styled RTÉ lyric fm). It also moved from Dublin to Limerick as part of a policy of regionalisation. At the time of the station's launch, RTÉ lyric fm's digital studios in Cornmarket Row, Limerick, were the most advanced in the country.

RTÉ Lyric FM won PPI National Station of the Year for the second time in 2004.

In May 2009, the station celebrated ten years of broadcasting. This was celebrated with a concert by the RTÉ National Symphony Orchestra and RTÉ Philharmonic Choir. Current presenters include Marty Whelan, George Hamilton, John Kelly, Liz Nolan, Paul Herriott, Niall Carroll, Lorcan Murray, Bernard Clarke, Aedín Gormley, and Ellen Cranitch.

As part of RTÉ's calls for better funding a Prime Time report was produced about the closing of the service, this caused public reaction calling for the service to be saved. RTÉ refuted these claims saying that they planned to move the service from Limerick city and maintain it out of Dublin and Cork. Later RTÉ attended the Oireachtas communications committee were various local representatives complained to RTÉ that the service should not be moved from Limerick City. This was followed by a large debate on funding public service broadcasters/media in Dáil Éireann, as a stop gap measure the Government granted RTÉ an extra €10 million in funding to help them fund services such as RTÉ Lyric FM, in 2020 RTÉ cut funding to Lyric FM by 16%. Funding in 2020 was €5.5m, down from €6.5m in the previous year.
