= RTÉ Raidió na Gaeltachta =

Irish language radio station

Coordinates: 53.2900°N 9.5559°W

- Ireland
- Broadcast area: Republic of Ireland: FM, TV; Northern Ireland: FM, TV; United Kingdom: Satellite radio; Worldwide: Internet radio
- Frequencies: FM: 92 MHz - 94 MHz (Ireland); 102.7 MHz (Northern Ireland); Digital terrestrial television
- RDS: RTE RnaG

Programming
- Format: Irish-language speech and music

Ownership
- Owner: Raidió Teilifís Éireann
- Sister stations: RTÉ Radio 1 RTÉ 2fm RTÉ lyric fm RTÉ Gold

History
- First air date: 2 April 1972

Links
- Website: www.rte.ie/rnag/

RTÉ Raidió na Gaeltachta (Irish pronunciation: [ˈɾˠadʲiːoː n̪ˠə ˈɡeːl̪ˠt̪ˠəxt̪ˠə]; "Radio of the Gaeltacht"), abbreviated RnaG, is an Irish language radio station owned and operated by RTÉ. The station is available on FM in Ireland and via satellite and on the internet. In 2022, Raidio na Gaeltachta celebrated its 50th year in broadcasting. The station's main-headquarters are in Casla, County Galway with major studios also in Gaoth Dobhair, County Donegal and Ballydavid, County Kerry.

== History ==
=== Background ===
After the Irish Free State was formed and the Irish Civil War was concluded, the new state set up a single radio channel named 2RN in 1926, launched by Douglas Hyde. This was run by the Irish Post Office and was not a private enterprise. The radio program, operating out of Dublin, largely served the Anglophone population and at best reached as far as County Tipperary; a situation which did not change until more powerful transmitters were adopted in the 1930s at Athlone. Those involved in setting up 2RN and J. J. Walsh (Minister for Posts and Telegraphs from 1923 to 1927) discussed the possibility of setting up an Irish-language radio service for the Gaeltacht community and more widely were sympathetic to Irish culture which included language revival, but the project was frustrated due to economic reasons and came to little.

If we do not revive and develop Irish, we must inevitably be assimilated by one of these two communities (United Kingdom or the United States), or by the combined power by which they must eventually form and in that case our name and tradition and history will vanish out of human ken and our national individuality will be lost.

— P. S. O'Hegarty, Secretary of the Department for Posts and Telegraphs, 1924.

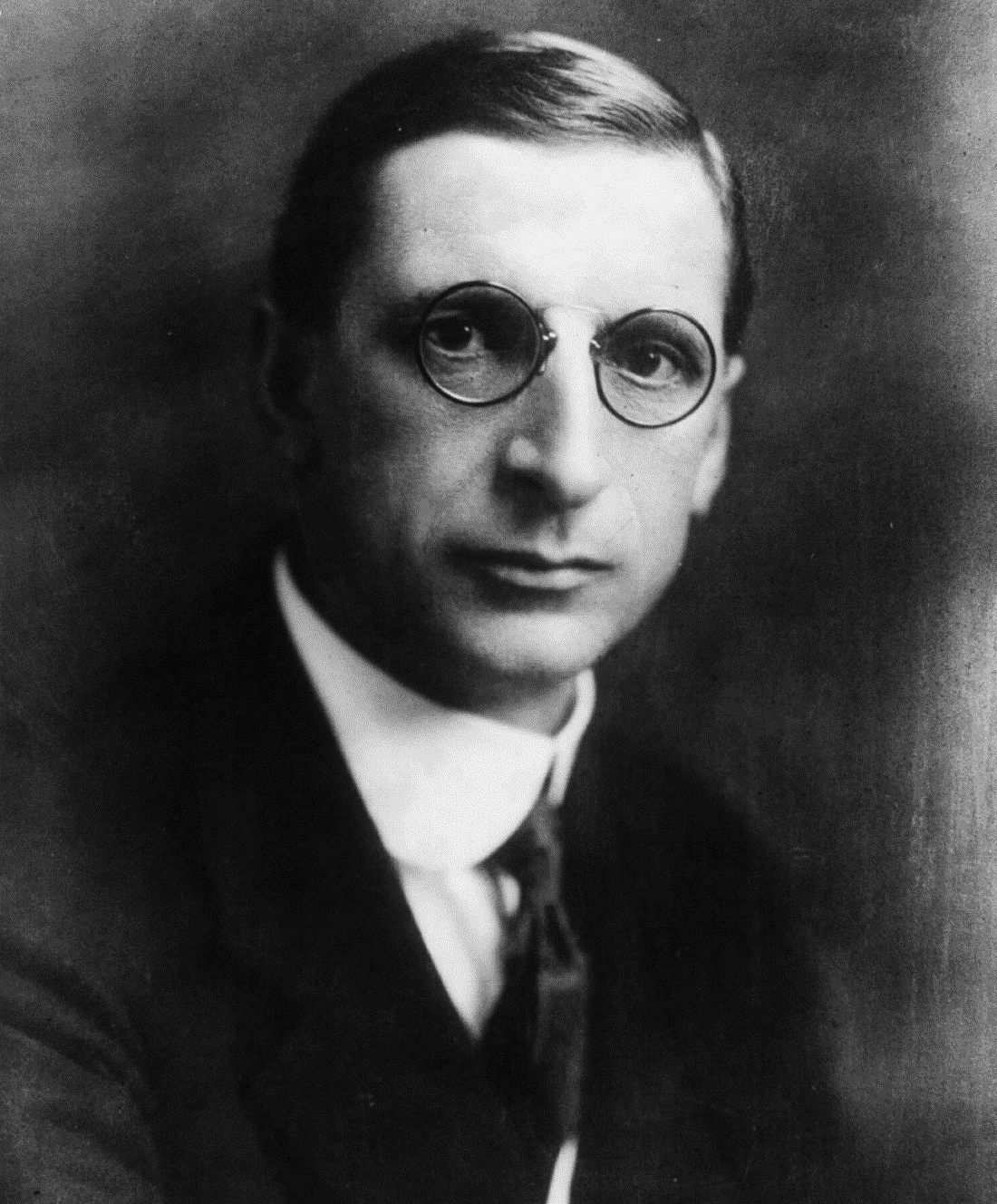
Éamon de Valera, Taoiseach and later President of Ireland, supported the idea of establishing a Gaeltacht radio station.

As the Irish language was valued as part of Irish national identity and a marker of the young state's independence, there were some broadcasts in the language such as Nuacht and Tréimhseachán Teann (shows with English equivalents), the latter written by Séamus Ó Néill and Ciarán Ó Nualláin (brother of Brian Ó Nualláin). These featured alongside focus on Gaelic games, Irish traditional music and Catholic religious programming as part of a general nation-building content focus. In the 1940s, there were shows which sought to proactively teach the language such as Is Your Irish Rusty? and Listen and Learn. Irish-language programming suffered from a shortage of materials and for audience figures. In 1943, Taoiseach Éamon de Valera – whose wife Sinéad Ní Fhlannagáin was a keen Conradh na Gaeilge activist – promoted the idea of a Gaeltacht station again, but there was no breakthrough. By this time, 2RN had become Radio Éireann and still only had one channel, with limited broadcasting hours, often in competition for listeners with BBC Radio and Radio Luxembourg.

In the 1950s, a general liberalisation and commercialisation, indeed Americanisation began to occur in Ireland, as a push was made to move Ireland from a rural-agrarian society with a protectionist cultural policy, towards a market economy basis, with supply and demand the primarily basis of public communications. This brought Ireland into line culturally with the Western powers and eventually paved the way for its entrance into the European Economic Community. In 1960, RTÉ was established and direct control of communications moved from a government ministry position to a non-governmental RTÉ Director-General position, first filled by the American, Edward Roth. Previous cultural policies, including broadcasting in Irish, reduced in percentage, as ratings and profit became key. Eventually, in the late 1960s, a civil rights movement in the Gaeltacht, particularly Conamara emerged, seeking development and services for Irish-speakers, including a radio service. Out of the Gluaiseacht Chearta Siabhialta na Gaeltachta's advocacy came the pirate radio station Saor Raidió Chonamara in 1970. This set the subsequent discourse for Irish-language and Gaeltacht issues as a civil rights and minority rights imperative.

=== Foundation ===
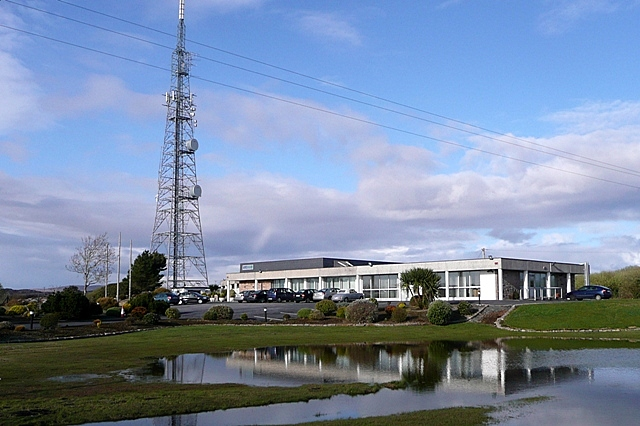
Raidió na Gaeltachta headquarters in Casla, County Galway. It is located in the Conamara Gaeltacht.

Gerry Collins, the Minister for Posts and Telegraphs, announced in the Dáil in February 1971 that a new radio station for the Gaeltacht would be created. Raidió na Gaeltachta began broadcasting at 3pm on 2 April 1972 as part of Easter Sunday programming. During the very first broadcast, the main station at Casla, County Galway was not yet finished and the studios in County Kerry and County Donegal were still in construction, so it was broadcast from Galway. The first Ceannaire (Controller) Pádraic Ó Raghallaigh opened the show, which was followed by a recording from President Éamon de Valera. A recording of Seán Ó Riada's Irish-language Mass, Ceol an Aifrinn (which includes the hymn Ag Críost an Síol) from the Seipéal Mhic Dara at Carraroe was also played.

At foundation, the station began with a staff of seven, including six former teachers and a businessman: Ó Raghallaigh, Breandán Feiritéar, Timlín Ó Cearnaigh, Máirtín Ó Fátharta, Seán Ó Tuairisg, Maidhc P. Ó Conaola, Mícheál Ó Sé and Feardorcha Ó Colla. Initially, Raidió na Gaeltachta broadcast for only two hours a day and was only available in or near the three largest Gaeltacht districts. The local studio at Derrybeg in Gweedore, County Donegal, under the direction of Ulstermen, Ó Cearnaigh and Ó Colla, aided the native Irish music scene there. In the 1970s, Raidió na Gaeltachta gave early coverage to Clannad and Mairéad Ní Mhaonaigh (later the singer for Altan). These groups would gain popularity not only in Ireland, but on the international stage, selling millions of records during the 1980s especially. The station was dedicated to bringing the listener general news, both national and international (which, as a result of The Troubles, meant reporters who had Irish-language surnames could have a "very difficult [time] at army checkpoints"), as well as Gaelic sports coverage and more localised affairs of significance to the community in the Gaeltacht.

=== 21st century ===
Following the putting in place of a fourth RTÉ national radio transmitter network (used for RTÉ lyric fm), the station expanded to 24 hours from 1 October 2001. Listenership figures are hard to come by, as the station does not make payments to be included covered in the JNLR listenership survey. It is claimed that – as it doesn't carry advertising (the only Irish radio station not to do so) – paying to be included in a survey organised mainly for the benefit of the Irish advertising industry would be a waste of scarce funds. It is generally believed that listenership is high amongst fluent Irish speakers but its appeal among those learning the language is not as high as TG4 because (despite being available nationally) it is widely perceived as being oriented (as its name suggests) towards Gaeltacht residents.

For many years, Raidió na Gaeltachta was the only Irish-language broadcaster in the country; from the 1990s, it was joined by a television service, Telefís na Gaeilge (now known as TG4), and by regional community radio stations: Raidió na Life in Dublin, Raidió Fáilte in Belfast and Raidió Rí-Rá.

==== English-language music ====
In March 2005, RTÉ announced that RnaG would allow songs with English lyrics to be played between 21:00 and 01:00, as part of a new popular music strand. In April 2005, it was announced that the name of this strand would be Anocht FM ('Tonight FM'). On weeknights the strand includes a new programme, Géill Slí ('Give Way'), as well as the existing long-running An Taobh Tuathail slot. The new service was launched on 2 May 2005. The first track with English-language lyrics played was "Blister in the Sun" by the Violent Femmes, chosen by public vote.

==== Pay parity ====
On 12 July 2024, staff at RTÉ Raidio na Gaeltachta won the right to pay parity with journalists working through the medium of the English language in Ireland.

The development follows a long running campaign by the NUJ, SIPTU and the RTÉ Group of Unions and is in line with the recommendations in the report by the Expert Advisory Committee on Contractor Fees, HR and other matters, the report by the Joint Oireachtas Media Committee and the report of the Future of Media Commission.

After campaigning for several years for pay parity with equivalent posts working within the English language, the three Irish language grades at Raidio na Gaeltacha will be moved in line with their counterparts in the English language grades. These three Irish language job grades are: Clár Reachtaire, Reachtaire Rúnaíochta Grade 1 and Reachtaire Rúnaíochta Grade 2, and the National Union of Journalists press release on the matter notes that the job grades combine a range of journalistic and production skills and that they differ only in title from their equivalents working through English.

== Locations ==
RnaG is based in Casla, County Galway. It also has studios at Gaoth Dobhair (Gweedore), County Donegal; Baile na nGall in Ard na Caithne, County Kerry; Castlebar, County Mayo; with a smaller studio in Ring, County Waterford and the RTÉ Radio Centre in Dublin. The station is operated by RTÉ, but has a separate advisory council, Comhairle Raidió na Gaeltachta, which is appointed by the RTÉ Authority. RTÉ also appoints the Ceannaire, or Controller, of RnaG, who has day-to-day responsibility for the service.

== Audience ==
According to the 2011 JNLR survey, RnaG then had a weekly listenership of 100,000 which equates to a 3% market share. This is similar to Welsh-language BBC Radio Cymru, with 116,000 listeners and a 2.4% share.

== See also ==
- Tuairisc.ie
- BBC Radio nan Gàidheal – Scottish Gaelic (Gàidhlig) radio service.
- TG4 - Irish language television service
- List of Irish-language media
- List of Celtic-language media
