= RTÉ 2fm =

Irish national radio station

- Dublin; Ireland
- Broadcast area: Republic of Ireland and Northern Ireland; Worldwide (mainly the United Kingdom on satellite)
- Frequencies: FM: 90 MHz – 92 MHz; 97 MHz (Northeast); Saorview: 202; Virgin Media: 902; Sky: 0138; Freesat: 751
- RDS: RTE 2FM

Programming
- Format: Music/Talk

Ownership
- Owner: RTÉ
- Sister stations: RTÉ Radio 1 RTÉ lyric fm RTÉ Raidió na Gaeltachta; RTÉ Gold

History
- First air date: 31 May 1979; 47 years ago
- Former names: RTÉ Radio 2 (1979–1988); 2FM (1988–1999)
- Former frequencies: MW: 612 kHz and 1278 kHz; DAB: 12B

Links
- Webcast: Web Stream
- Website: RTÉ 2fm

RTÉ 2fm, or 2FM as it is more commonly referred to, is an Irish radio station operated by RTÉ. The station specialises in current popular music and chart hits and is the second national radio station in Ireland.

== History ==
The station commenced broadcasting on 31 May 1979 and has undergone numerous name and line-up changes.

In 2008, the station had 17% of the national audience, making it the second most popular station in Ireland after RTÉ Radio 1 (23%). According to The Irish Times, the 9 am – noon slot is "the most critical in the 2fm schedule both in terms of audience figures and advertising revenue". This was presented by Gerry Ryan from 1988 until his sudden death on 30 April 2010. The Gerry Ryan Show was the longest running show in the station's history.

The station is recognised as being the first in the world to play any new single released by U2, due to the band's long-term friendship with Dave Fanning. They celebrated their thirty-year association with each other in September 2009 with the airing of a special weekend of programmes, including U2's Top 30 Moments.

RTÉ 2fm, like RTÉ Radio 1, technically broadcasts 24 hours a day, however it plays a computerised music feed weekdays from midnight - 6 am and weekends from 5 - 7 am (originally replays of previous day's selected programmes) along with live news updates on the hour, and weekend overnight hours have been home to specialist music recorded shows since 2001. The station regularly broadcasts live from large Irish music festivals, such as Oxegen, Electric Picnic and Life Festival, and latterly has broadcast live music under the title 2fm XtrAlive (formerly 2fm Live), with the most recorded visiting act being Manic Street Preachers. The series of shows entitled the 2fm 2moro 2our maintained the station's reputation for homegrown live performance promotion as well as offering career boosts to artists such as The Immediate, The Flaws, Ham Sandwich, Concerto For Constantine and David Geraghty.

As part of the expansion of RTÉ's young people's music radio output, an all-music (mostly of the rock genre) sister station of 2FM, RTÉ 2XM, designed for students and young adults, now operates on the RTÉ DAB Multiplex.

== Reception ==
RTÉ 2fm is available in Ireland on 90-92 MHz FM, and on 97 MHz in the northeast. The station was previously available on 612 kHz medium wave until 12 April 2004 from the Athlone transmitter. It was also available on 1278 kHz on low power transmissions from Dublin (until December 2003) and from Cork (until 12 April 2004).

=== Radio 2 (1979–1988) ===
RTÉ Radio 2, as it was originally known, began broadcasting on 31 May 1979. "Like Clockwork" by The Boomtown Rats was the first song on air, played by Larry Gogan. It was developed as a response by RTÉ to the pirate radio craze sweeping Dublin and the rest of the country. Its original slogan was "Radio 2 Comin'atcha" and, as well as broadcasting popular music, it carried a number of other musical strands as well as news and current affairs. Its main inspiration in format was BBC Radio 1. Its original broadcast frequencies were 612 kHz (Athlone/nationwide) and 1278 kHz (Dublin and Cork) MW (until 2004) and 90-92 MHz FM. As well as Larry Gogan, other original DJs included Vincent Hanley and Jimmy Greeley, who transferred from RTÉ Radio 1, and Mark Cagney, who transferred from RTÉ Cork Local Radio. Most of the remaining DJs were recruited directly from the pirate stations, such as Michael McNamara, Declan Meehan, Ronan Collins, Gerry Ryan and Dave Fanning.

=== 2FM (1988–1999) ===
2FM logo used from 1988 to 1999

In 1988 after many years presenting a nightly music show called Lights out for around 6 years previously The Gerry Ryan Show, a morning topical radio show, began broadcasts. Not long afterwards, RTÉ began radical changes to Radio 2's format. Most non-pop music programming was dropped. The station was rebranded as "2FM" in 1988. At this stage the basic schedule for the next decade or so was put in place: Ian Dempsey, Gerry Ryan, Larry Gogan, Gareth O'Callaghan, Tony Fenton, Dusty Rhodes, DJ Micky Mac (Michael McNamara), Barry Lang, John Kenny and Dave Fanning were staples of this period. Many of these presenters have stayed with 2FM over the years while others have moved to competing stations. In 1998, after 18 years with the station, drivetime presenter Barry Lang left to become an airline pilot, in the Middle East.

"RTÉ Radio 2"
From RTÉ Radio 2.ogg (1988)

2FM in this era was at its most popular. Its mobile broadcasting unit, the roadcaster, made regular trips nationwide, with 2FM organising live events throughout Ireland, such as the "Beat on the Street" with M.C and 'Eye in the Sky' traffic news presenter Electric Eddie, Doug Murray, introducing the station's DJs to the vast crowds which gathered at events throughout Ireland and "Lark in the Park". New bands would often get their "big break" by being featured on the Dave Fanning Show. Gerry Ryan's radio show became a national institution.

=== RTÉ 2fm (2000–2009) ===
By the year 2000, the 1990s schedule was looking very stale. In addition, 2FM suffered the high-profile departure of Ian Dempsey to the newly established commercial national radio station Today FM. Both Today FM and the emerging independent local radio sector had eroded 2FM's once unassailable listenership base. Tony Fenton was the most recent departure to Today FM in September 2004. 2FM in turn raided Phantom FM for Cormac Battle, Jenny Huston and Dan Hegarty, while Colm & Jim-Jim were poached from FM104. Old stalwarts such as Dave Fanning and Larry Gogan were moved to the weekend to make way for the likes of Rick O'Shea and Nikki Hayes. The Gerry Ryan Show continued to be the most popular programme on the station and one of the top-rated radio programmes in the country.

In 1999, veteran producer and disc jockey John Clarke was made Head of 2FM. Unlike the previous people in that position, John had worked his way through a number of pirate stations before joining RTÉ in the late eighties. He rebranded 2FM with a new blue and red logo (as "RTÉ 2fm") and re-arranged the schedule. During this period (Late 1990s/Early 2000s) long serving station names such as Andy Ruane, Lorcan Murray, Michael McNamara, Mike Ryan, Suzanne Duffy, Peter Collins, Bob Conway, Simon Young and Gerry Wison disappeared from the schedule.

In 2003, Ryan Tubridy was poached from RTÉ Radio 1 to present The Full Irish breakfast programme; however in 2005 he returned to Radio 1 for a number of years, heralding an era of instability in breakfast broadcasting as first Ruth Scott and Rick O'Shea took charge of The Rick and Ruth Breakfast Show, before being replaced 5 months later by Marty Whelan in September 2005. DJ Mark McCabe and John Power arrived to present dance music shows at weekends. Later, more changes saw Larry Gogan being moved from his lunchtime slot to "drive time". A news programme, Newsbeat, was added to the schedules in response to criticisms that RTÉ 2fm was not fulfilling its remit as a public service broadcaster. Newer alternative DJs such as the "Phantom 3", Canadian Jenny Huston, Dan Hegarty and Kerbdog front-man Cormac Battle also joined the line-up, as did Jennifer Greene.

From 1999 to 2007 Will Leahy presented the most popular weekend show in the station's history, 'The Saturday Show'. It was broadcast live from Limerick each Saturday. This programme ended its run in 2007 with a record 252,000 listeners, the station's second most successful show in its history after only The Gerry Ryan Show.

On 12 January 2007 RTÉ announced a major revamp of 2fm with the axing of Marty Whelan's breakfast show to make way for The Colm & Jim-Jim Breakfast Show as 2fm engaged in a spot of poaching for once in persuading Colm Hayes and Jim-Jim Nugent to leave FM104. As FM104 continues to broadcast its breakfast show under The Strawberry Alarm Clock title, the 2fm version was known as the Colm and Jim-Jim Breakfast Show (initially referred to in pre-publicity as the 2fm Alarm Clock, however the name was changed after FM104 threatened legal action). During this 2007 revamp Will Leahy, formerly of the Saturday Show, was promoted to the weekday Drivetime slot, which he broadcast from his base at the RTÉ Limerick studios on the fifth floor of the Cornmarket. Larry Gogan was moved to the weekend and Dave Fanning moved to Radio 1 for a period (though he still presented a Sunday night programme on 2fm). The new schedule launched on 5 March 2007.

John Clarke resigned unexpectedly his position as Head of RTÉ 2fm on 14 August 2009. Four days later, and after spending some time presenting on RTÉ Radio 1, it was announced that Dave Fanning would be returning to RTÉ 2fm to present his evening weekday show in his old 7 pm slot.

=== The John McMahon years (2009–2013) ===
Clarke was replaced by John McMahon the following month. The return of Fanning followed the failure by RTÉ 2fm in its attempts to target teenagers, while Larry Gogan also returned to weekday lunch-times. There was comment within the Irish media when, despite electing to target a middle-aged audience, the radio station opted in September 2009 not to playlist David Gray, an English singer-songwriter who was popular with that age group in Ireland. Gray's music was played on Today FM and other stations at the time. In spite of this arrangement, Gray has since turned up on Celebrity Sunday, a programme featuring celebrities and which, when it featured Nicky Byrne, became a Twittertrending topic. McMahon began his reign by bringing in several schedule changes from early 2010, new additions to the station included the arrivals of Hector Ó hEochagáin and Tommy Tiernan live from Galway, and 'Celebrity Sunday' which included guest presenters such as Louis Walsh, Neil Hannon, Thomas Walsh, Mike Scott and Nicky Byrne.

In the aftermath of the sudden death of Gerry Ryan in 2010, a number of changes were made to the schedule. Hector Ó hEochagáin headed a breakfast show called 'Breakfast with Hector' which broadcast live from Galway each morning. Ryan Tubridy took over the 9 am – 11 am slot, with Rick O'Shea the main afternoon anchor. Will Leahy presented the drive time slot, a show which he broadcast live from Limerick for seven years.

=== The Dan Healy years (2013–present) ===
In 2014 following the appointment of Dan Healy as head of 2fm, the schedule was revamped. On 17 December 2013 RTÉ announced that Hector Ó hEochagáin would finish presenting the breakfast show. He was replaced by Jennifer Maguire, Bernard O'Shea and Keith Walsh. The regionally produced breakfast and drive time shows were axed, and all weekday shows were centralised to Dublin. An online campaign protested at the removal of Will Leahy and Hector Ó hEochagáin from their regionally produced shows. Larry Gogan, Dave Fanning and Will Leahy were moved to the weekend. Nicky Byrne took over the 11 am – 2 pm slot.

In 2016, RTÉ 2fm received new branding, new content and a new website.

The show hosted by Jennifer Maguire, Bernard O'Shea and Keith Walsh was called the Breakfast Republic which is the second-longest running show, lasting over 5 years, with the majority of its presenters resigning to other shows across RTÉ. Doireann Garrihy and Eoghan McDermott fronted the show in the following two years, followed by Garrihy continuing with new hosts Carl Mullan and Donncha O'Callaghan until her resignation in May 2024. Mullan and O'Callaghan continued with new host Aifric O'Connell. However this was shortly followed by O'Callaghan's departure in July. This was a period of a lot of change at 2FM, as Jennifer Maguire left the show, along with the 2 Johnnies as well. In January 2025, there was a major upheaval announced at 2FM which announced a slew of changes focussing on bringing some new voices into the station along with some old voices in Doireann Garrihy returning. Some of the stalwarts at the station, like Aifric O'Connell, Taran O'Sullivan, David O'Reilly, Callyann Brennan and Fionnuala Moran disappeared from the roster.

=== 2FM Song Contest ===
In 1982, 2FM held its first annual Song Contest with the goal of finding Ireland's most talented songwriter. The contest was created by producer/presenter Kevin Hough and continued for 25 years. Winners included Naimee Coleman, Laura Izabor, RuthAnne and Dave Geraghty.

== Frequencies ==
=== Current frequencies ===
RTÉ 2fm is broadcast on:
Broadcast type	Frequencies
FM	90-92 MHz 97 MHz (Northeast)
Saorview	channel 202
Satellite television	Saorsat channel 5227 Sky channel 0138 Freesat channel 751
Cable television	Virgin Media channel 902
Internet	RTÉ Radio Player and online streaming services

=== Former frequencies ===
Broadcast type	Recent frequencies	Switch-off date
Medium wave	612 kHz (Athlone) 1278 kHz (Dublin and Cork)	12 April 2004 (612 kHz and 1278 kHz Cork only) December 2003 (1278 kHz Dublin only)
DAB	channel 12B	31 March 2021

== Controllers ==
Years served	Controller
1999–2009	John Clarke
2009–2013	John McMahon
2013–present	Dan Healy

== Logos ==
2FM (1988–1999)

RTÉ 2fm (2010–2016)

In January 2016, a new logo was revealed which replaced the old one that had been in use for seven years.

== Digital sister stations ==
From 2007 until 2025, RTÉ operated multiple music-led digital stations, which could be described as sister stations to 2fm: RTÉ 2XM, a station playing new and alternative music; RTÉ Gold, a station playing popular music from before 1990; and RTÉ Pulse, a station playing dance and electronic music. There was also a non-presented chill out music service, RTÉ Chill, which shares a broadcast slot with children station RTÉ Junior.

As of 2026, only RTÉ Gold remains, with the other services closing on December 31st 2025 for cost-cutting reasons.
