= List of years in Irish television =

This page indexes the individual year in Irish television pages. Each year is annotated with a significant event as a reference point.

2020s – 2010s – 2000s – 1990s – 1980s – 1970s – 1960s – 1950s

== 2020s ==
- 2029 in Irish television
- 2028 in Irish television
- 2027 in Irish television
- 2026 in Irish television
- 2025 in Irish television
- 2024 in Irish television
- 2023 in Irish television – Ryan Tubridy stands down as presenter of The Late Late Show and is succeeded by Patrick Kielty.
- 2022 in Irish television – Launch of Toy Show The Musical which proves to be a financial disaster for RTÉ.
- 2021 in Irish television – Sky News is added to Saorview.
- 2020 in Irish television – Launch of RTÉ's Home School Hub and its companion show, Home School Extra; both programmes are created in response to the closure of all schools during the COVID-19 pandemic in the Republic of Ireland

== 2010s ==
- 2019 in Irish television – Launch of the timeshift channel RTÉ2+1.
- 2018 in Irish television – TV3 is renamed Virgin Media One.
- 2017 in Irish television – UTV Ireland is renamed be3.
- 2016 in Irish television – ITV sells UTV Ireland to TV3.
- 2015 in Irish television – Launch of new commercial channel UTV Ireland.
- 2014 in Irish television
- 2013 in Irish television – Launch of RTÉ One HD
- 2012 in Irish television – The analogue television service in the Republic of Ireland is switched off on 24 October, with Northern Ireland having completed its own switchover the previous evening day.
- 2011 in Irish television – RTÉ Television celebrates 50 years on air with the launch of TV50.
- 2010 in Irish television – Trial transmissions of Saorview, Ireland's free-to-air digital television service begin on 29 October.

== 2000s ==
- 2009 in Irish television – The Broadcasting Act 2009 paves the way for the set up of digital television in Ireland.
- 2008 in Irish television – RTÉ News Now is launched as an online news service.
- 2007 in Irish television – The RTÉ Irish language channel, TG4, becomes a separate entity having previously been operated as a subsidiary of RTÉ under the name Telefís na Gaeilge.
- 2006 in Irish television – Launch of Channel 6, later rebranded as 3e, and Sky announces the closure of Sky News Ireland.
- 2005 in Irish television – Taoiseach Bertie Ahern opens RTÉ's new studios in London, based at Millbank opposite the British Houses of Parliament.
- 2004 in Irish television – Network 2 is rebranded as RTÉ Two. Sky News Ireland is launched.
- 2003 in Irish television – Stories from the Twin Towers, a documentary about the September 11 terrorist attacks by RTÉ News journalists Caroline Bleahan and Jim Fahy wins the Gold World Medal for top September 11 documentary at The New York Festival's 45th annual Television Programming Awards.
- 2002 in Irish television – Give Up Yer Aul Sins an animated film produced for RTÉ Television by Brown Bag Films is nominated for an Oscar for Animated Short Film.
- 2001 in Irish television – RTÉ Television News introduces subtitles and Glenroe airs for the last time.
- 2000 in Irish television – RTÉ undergoes a programme of re-structuring.

== 1990s ==
- 1999 in Irish television – Gay Byrne presents his final edition of The Late Late Show on RTÉ Television.
- 1998 in Irish television – Launch of TV3, the Republic of Ireland's first commercial television channel.
- 1997 in Irish television – The RTÉ Authority seeks permission from the Irish Government to find a partner to fund digital terrestrial television.
- 1996 in Irish television – The RTÉ website, RTÉ.ie, is launched. The Irish language television service Teilifís na Gaeilge (TG4) goes on air for the first time.
- 1995 in Irish television – RTÉ appoints Mark Little as its first Washington Correspondent.
- 1994 in Irish television – The Minister for Arts, Culture and the Gaeltacht, Michael D. Higgins repeals Section 31 of the Broadcasting Authority Act.
- 1993 in Irish television – RTÉ establishes an Independent Production Unit.
- 1992 in Irish television – The Irish language drama serial Ros na Rún is first aired on RTÉ Television as a series of 15-minute episodes.
- 1991 in Irish television – Proceedings from the Dáil Éireann, the lower house of the Irish parliament are aired on a regular basis.
- 1990 in Irish television – The Broadcasting Act comes into law. The Act includes amendments to earlier legislation covering advertising and commercial promotion.

== 1980s ==
- 1989 in Irish television – Irish television soap Fair City is first transmitted.
- 1988 in Irish television – RTÉ 2 is rebranded as Network 2 as part of a major overhaul of the channel.
- 1987 in Irish television – RTÉ Television introduces its Aertel teletext service.
- 1986 in Irish television – The current affairs series Questions and Answers (1986–2009) first goes on air.
- 1985 in Irish television – An edition of The Late Late Show causes controversy after showing an interview with a pair of lesbian former nuns. The Riordans is broadcast for the final time on RTÉ Radio, having last aired on television in 1979.
- 1984 in Irish television – RTÉ presents live coverage of U.S. President Ronald Reagan's visit to Ireland. Charlie Bird becomes the first reporter on RTÉ Television to prevent a news item via satellite.
- 1983 in Irish television – Salute to Irish Television, an evening of RTÉ Television programmes, at the Lincoln Center in New York. Debut of the long-running television soap Glenroe.
- 1982 in Irish television – The Government issues a directive to RTÉ to prohibit the airing of party political broadcasts by Sinn Féin, the political wing of the Provisional IRA.
- 1981 in Irish television – RTÉ is given special government permission to broadcast two television programmes that are part of a series jointly produced with the BBC titled The Troubles. The programmes include interviews with organisations banned from the media by Section 31 of the Broadcasting Authority Act.
- 1980 in Irish television – The rural drama serial Bracken is aired. Cast members included Gabriel Byrne and Dana Wynter.

== 1970s ==
- 1979 in Irish television – The rural television soap The Riordans airs on television for the last time, transferring to radio. The children's television series Bosco debuts on RTÉ 2.
- 1978 in Irish television – Ireland's second television channel, RTÉ 2 goes on air. The controversial secondary school drama The Spike is taken off air mid-season following furore over a nude scene.
- 1977 in Irish television – RTÉ Television begins new programming schedule policy for its prime time evening slot (8–10 p.m.).
- 1976 in Irish television – The Broadcasting Authority (Amendment) Act becomes law. The Act includes amendments to Section 31 of the original 1960 Broadcasting Authority Act and the establishment of the Broadcasting Complaints Commission.
- 1975 in Irish television – Geraldine McInerney becomes the first female newsreader on RTÉ Television.
- 1974 in Irish television – In its long-awaited report the Broadcasting Review Committee endorses a second television channel for Ireland. The cable television company RTÉ Relays Ltd (later Cablelink) is established.
- 1973 in Irish television – The Broadcasting Review Committee published an interim report recommending the establishment of a second television channel for the Republic of Ireland. It is envisaged that it will broadcast a mix of domestic and foreign programming.
- 1972 in Irish television – After RTÉ Television airs more film of IRA members, the Irish government meets with the RTÉ Authority to express its displeasure.
- 1971 in Irish television – Minister for Posts and Telegraphs Gerry Collins enacts Section 31 of the Broadcasting Act after an edition of the current affairs programme Seven Days features interviews with both branches of the IRA – the Official IRA and Provisional IRA.
- 1970 in Irish television – Finnish Television airs a four-hour broadcast of RTÉ programmes titled Ireland Tonight.

== 1960s ==
- 1969 in Irish television – RTÉ opens a studio in Belfast, and subsequently becomes an important international provider of coverage relating to events in Northern Ireland.
- 1968 in Irish television – RTÉ cameraman Gay O'Brien and soundman Eamon Hayes film a civil rights march in Derry, Northern Ireland during which RUC officers baton charge the crowd and use water cannon.
- 1967 in Irish television – RTÉ Television abandons its plans to provide coverage of the Vietnam War following intervention from the Irish government.
- 1966 in Irish television – RTÉ's current affairs programme, Seven Days is first aired.
- 1965 in Irish television – RTÉ and BBC collaborate on an historic television broadcast as Taoiseach Seán Lemass and Prime Minister of Northern Ireland Terence O'Neill meet for the first time in Belfast. First airing of The Riordans, a rural drama serial which became the inspiration for the UK soap Emmerdale Farm.
- 1964 in Irish television – Tolka Row (1964–1968), an urban drama serial by Maura Laverty first goes on air.
- 1963 in Irish television – RTÉ provides extensive coverage of the visit of U.S. President John F. Kennedy.
- 1962 in Irish television – Telefís Éireann shows the first party political broadcast following that year's Budget. The Late Late Show, the world's longest running chat show, first goes on air.
- 1961 in Irish television – Telefís Éireann goes on air on 31 December with an address from Irish President Éamon de Valera.
- 1960 in Irish television – The Broadcasting Authority Act, establishing the new television service, is enacted.

== 1950s ==
- 1950s in Irish television – The television service for the Republic of Ireland did not begin until 1961, but preparations for its introduction were being made throughout the 1950s, while in Northern Ireland the first television service came on air in 1955 with the launch of the BBC television service for Northern Ireland.

== See also ==
- List of years in Ireland
- List of Irish films
