= 1977 in Irish television =

List of years in Irish television	(table)
- … 1967; 1968; 1969; 1970; 1971; 1972; 1973; 1974; 1975; 1976; 1977; 1978; 1979; 1980; 1981; 1982; 1983; 1984; 1985; 1986; 1987 …
- Art; Archaeology; Architecture; Literature; Music; Philosophy; Science; +...

The following is a list of events relating to television in Ireland from 1977.

== Events ==
- 5 July – Pádraig Faulkner is appointed Minister for Posts and Telegraphs.
- Undated – RTÉ Television begins new programming schedule policy for its prime time evening slot (8–10 p.m.).

== Debuts ==
- 20 January – Time Now Mr T (1977)

== Ongoing television programmes ==
- RTÉ News: Nine O'Clock (1961–present)
- RTÉ News: Six One (1962–present)
- The Late Late Show (1962–present)
- The Riordans (1965–1979)
- Quicksilver (1965–1981)
- Wanderly Wagon (1967–1982)
- Hall's Pictorial Weekly (1971–1980)
- Sports Stadium (1973–1997)
- Trom agus Éadrom (1975–1985)
- The Late Late Toy Show (1975–present)

== Ending this year ==
- 17 March – Time Now Mr T (1977)

== Births ==
- 12 May – Laura Woods, television presenter and former radio continuity announcer
- 18 August – Elaine Crowley, journalist, newsreader and television presenter
- 27 December – Sinead Keenan, actress

== See also ==
- 1977 in Ireland
