= 1982 in Irish television =

| List of years in Irish television | (table) |
- … 1972; 1973; 1974; 1975; 1976; 1977; 1978; 1979; 1980; 1981; 1982; 1983; 1984; 1985; 1986; 1987; 1988; 1989; 1990; 1991; 1992 …
- Art; Archaeology; Architecture; Literature; Music; Philosophy; Science; +...

The following is a list of events relating to television in Ireland from 1982.

== Events ==
- February – The Government issues a directive to RTÉ to prohibit the airing of party political broadcasts by Sinn Féin, the political wing of the Provisional IRA.
- 18 February – Coverage of the 1982 general election is shown on radio and television.
- 9 March – John Wilson is appointed as Minister for Posts and Telegraphs.
- 31 October – RTÉ Television airs the drama The Ballroom of Romance, a drama based on the novel by William Trevor. The programme is a joint production with the BBC).
- 2 November – Launch of Channel 4, the United Kingdom's first new terrestrial television channel for two decades. Because it is aired in Northern Ireland, the channel is also available in many parts of the Republic.
- 18 November – RTÉ Television airs the drama The Year of the French, a series based on the novel by Thomas Flanagan. It is a co-production by RTÉ, the recently launched UK Channel 4 and FR3 from France.
- 12 December – The RTÉ Television documentary Is there one who understands me?', marking the centenary of the birth of author James Joyce, wins an Emmy Award. The programme was produced by Seán Ó Mordha.
- 14 December – Jim Mitchell is appointed Minister for Posts and Telegraphs.
- Undated – A poll produced by MRBI shows that of those who follow current affairs, 53% depend on television as their primary source of information, while 20% rely on radio and 17% on newspapers.

== Debuts ==
=== RTÉ 1 ===
- 26 April – (Germany) / (Japan) Maya the Honey Bee (1975–1976, 1979–1980)
- 6 October – Today Tonight (1982–1992)
- 6 October – (United States) / (Belgium) The Smurfs (1981–1989)
- 29 October – The Brendan Grace Show (1982)
- 31 October – The Ballroom of Romance (1982)
- Undated – Mailbag (1982–1996)

=== RTÉ 2 ===
- 14 February – (United States) The Pink Panther in: Pink at First Sight (1981)

== Ongoing television programmes ==
=== 1960s ===
- RTÉ News: Nine O'Clock (1961–present)
- RTÉ News: Six One (1962–present)
- The Late Late Show (1962–present)

=== 1970s ===
- Sports Stadium (1973–1997)
- Trom agus Éadrom (1975–1985)
- The Late Late Toy Show (1975–present)
- RTÉ News on Two (1978–2014)
- Bosco (1979–1996)
- The Sunday Game (1979–present)

== Ending this year ==
- 1 January – Bracken (1980–1982)
- 2 April – The Live Mike (1979–1982)
- 10 December – The Brendan Grace Show (1982)
- Undated – Wanderly Wagon (1967–1982)
- Undated – The Ballroom of Romance (1982)

== Births ==
- 23 March – Emma O'Driscoll, pop star, children's television presenter and reality television personality

== See also ==
- 1982 in Ireland
