= 1992 in Irish television =

List of years in Irish television	(table)
- … 1982; 1983; 1984; 1985; 1986; 1987; 1988; 1989; 1990; 1991; 1992; 1993; 1994; 1995; 1996; 1997; 1998; 1999; 2000; 2001; 2002 …
- Art; Archaeology; Architecture; Literature; Music; Philosophy; Science; +...

The following is a list of events relating to television in Ireland from 1992.

== Events ==
- 8 January – The US sitcom The Fresh Prince of Bel-Air, starring rapper Will Smith, begins premiering on Network 2 as part of The Den.
- 11 January – Máire Geoghegan-Quinn is appointed Minister for Tourism, Transport and Communications with responsibility for broadcasting.
- 17 January – On a day when seven Protestant construction workers had been killed by an IRA bomb in Northern Ireland, British Secretary of State for Northern Ireland, Peter Brooke appears on The Late Late Show. After a pleasant interview, host Gay Byrne coaxes and goads the unwilling Brooke into singing Oh My Darling, Clementine. Unionists are subsequently outraged at what seems to be a moment clearly out of touch with grieving families, and instantly request Brooke's resignation. A humiliated Brooke later loses his position as Secretary of State to Sir Patrick Mayhew after the 1992 British General Election in April.
- 9 April – UK children's animated series Henry's Cat begins airing for the first time on Irish television on Network 2 starting off with the series 3 episode "The Case of the Pilfered Pearls". Only series 3, 4 and 5 were broadcast in Ireland, although viewers with access to British television were able to see the first two series.
- 9 May – Ireland wins the Eurovision Song Contest with Why Me? composed by Johnny Logan and performed by Linda Martin.
- 23 July – Joe Barry is appointed Director-General of RTÉ.
- 23 September – Well known British sitcom One Foot in the Grave gets its first ever transmission on Network 2.
- 28 December – The Irish language drama serial Ros na Rún is first aired on RTÉ Television as a series of 15-minute episodes.
- Undated – Coronation Street moves from Network 2 to RTÉ 1.
- RTE goes on strike. The strike started on 21 January 1992. Around 1,600 staff at RTE from three unions (SIPTU, NUJ and ETU) had gone on strike over staffing levels at RTE. The dispute began on 21 January 1992 when two-person camera crews were introduced without the agreement of the SIPTU union. For nearly four weeks, all live home produced programming on both RTE One and Network Two were axed, with RTE filling its schedules with already recorded home produced shows, along with a large amount of imported new programming and archive programming from the BBC, ITV, Channel 4, USA and Australia, along with many films. The RTE News output on television was reduced to short news summaries. The strike ended on 17 February 1992, with a resolution reached between the unions and RTE management.

== Debuts ==
=== RTÉ One ===
- 18 January – Barney (1988–1989)
- 13 March – Habatales (1959–1960)
- 18 April – Coconuts (1990)
- 7 May – Loopy de Loop (1959–1965)
- 17 September – Prime Time (1992–present)
- Undated – Keeping Up Appearances (1990–1995)
- Undated – Farrell (1992–1997)

=== Network 2 ===
- 8 January – The Fresh Prince of Bel-Air (1990–1996)
- 8 January – / Beetlejuice (1989–1991)
- 21 January – All for One (1990)
- 25 January – Reasonable Doubts (1991–1993)
- 11 February – Victor and Hugo (1991–1992)
- 21 February – Fiddley Foodle Bird (1992)
- 9 March – Bobobobs (1988–1989)
- 30 March – The Legend of Prince Valiant (1991–1993)
- 9 April – Henry's Cat (1983–1993)
- 14 April – James Bond Jr. (1991–1992)
- 24 April – / Captain Zed and the Zee Zone (1991–1993)
- 11 May – / Where's Wally? (1991)
- 15 May – Kelly (1991–1992)
- 7 September – Neddy (1992)
- 8 September – Little Sir Nicholas (1990)
- 10 September – Just So Stories (1991)
- 18 September – Truckers (1992)
- 23 September – One Foot in the Grave (1990–2000)
- 20 October – Five Children and It (1991)
- 30 October – The Village by the Sea (1991)
- 11 November – Seabert (1985)
- 1 December – Foofur (1986–1988)
- 24 December – / Madeline's Christmas (1990)
- 24 December – / The Real Story of... (1990–1992)
- 24 December – On Christmas Eve (1992)
- 25 December – / The Little Engine That Could (1991)
- 26 December – Thunderbirds 2086 (1982)
- Undated - Mr. Bogus (1991-1992)

== Changes of network affiliation ==
Shows	Moved from	Moved to
Coronation Street	Network 2	RTÉ One
Henry's Leg	RTÉ One	Network 2
All Change	RTÉ One	Network 2
Round the Bend	RTÉ One	Network 2
Thunderbirds	RTÉ One	Network 2
Bosco	RTÉ One	Network 2
Children's Island	RTÉ One	Network 2
/ Rocky Hollow	RTÉ One	Network 2
Loopy de Loop	RTÉ One	Network 2
Satellite City	RTÉ One	Network 2

== Ongoing television programmes ==
=== 1960s ===
- RTÉ News: Nine O'Clock (1961–present)
- RTÉ News: Six One (1962–present)
- The Late Late Show (1962–present)

=== 1970s ===
- Sports Stadium (1973–1997)
- The Late Late Toy Show (1975–present)
- RTÉ News on Two (1978–2014)
- Bosco (1979–1996)
- The Sunday Game (1979–present)

=== 1980s ===
- Mailbag (1982–1996)
- Glenroe (1983–2001)
- Live at 3 (1986–1997)
- Saturday Live (1986–1999)
- Questions and Answers (1986–2009)
- Dempsey's Den (1986–2010)
- Marketplace (1987–1996)
- Where in the World? (1987–1996)
- Know Your Sport (1987–1998)
- Jo Maxi (1988–1993)
- Kenny Live (1988–1999)
- Fair City (1989–present)
- RTÉ News: One O'Clock (1989–present)

=== 1990s ===
- Would You Believe (1990s–present)
- Secrets (1990–1993)
- Winning Streak (1990–present)
- Blackboard Jungle (1991–1997)
- Challenging Times (1991–2001)

== Ending this year ==
- 16 April – Nighthawks (1988–1992)
- 27 August – Today Tonight (1980–1992)
- 30 November – Neddy (1992)

== See also ==
- 1992 in Ireland
