= 1980 in Irish television =

List of years in Irish television	(table)
- … 1970; 1971; 1972; 1973; 1974; 1975; 1976; 1977; 1978; 1979; 1980; 1981; 1982; 1983; 1984; 1985; 1986; 1987; 1988; 1989; 1990 …
- Art; Archaeology; Architecture; Literature; Music; Philosophy; Science; +...

The following is a list of events relating to television in Ireland from 1980.

== Events ==
- 6 January – The rural drama serial Bracken is aired. Cast members included Gabriel Byrne and Dana Wynter.
- 19 April – Ireland wins the 25th Eurovision Song Contest with What's Another Year? performed by Johnny Logan.
- 16 March – RTÉ broadcasts the historical drama series Strumpet City, based on the novel by James Plunkett is aired.
- 27 May – RTÉ Television broadcast an interview with a member of the Irish Republican Socialist Party (IRSP), an organisation not covered by Section 31.
- 9 July – RTÉ News reporter Charlie Bird makes his on camera debut.
- 4 October – Anything Goes, a show for young people, makes its debut. The programme is part of RTÉ's development of young people's programming.

== Debuts ==
=== RTÉ 1 ===
- 6 January – Bracken (1980–1982)
- 16 January – Strumpet City (1980)
- 12 April – (Canada) Matt and Jenny (1979–1980)
- 21 September – (United States) The Cheryl Ladd Special: Souvenirs (1980)

== Ongoing television programmes ==
=== 1960s ===
- RTÉ News: Nine O'Clock (1961–present)
- RTÉ News: Six One (1962–present)
- The Late Late Show (1962–present)
- Quicksilver (1965–1981)
- Wanderly Wagon (1967–1982)

=== 1970s ===
- Sports Stadium (1973–1997)
- Trom agus Éadrom (1975–1985)
- The Late Late Toy Show (1975–present)
- RTÉ News on Two (1978–2014)
- The Live Mike (1979–1982)
- Bosco (1979–1996)
- The Sunday Game (1979–present)

== Ending this year ==
- 19 March – Hall's Pictorial Weekly (1971–1980)

== Births ==
- 9 April – Jennifer Maguire, television presenter and reality show contestant
- Undated – Victor Burke, actor

== See also ==
- 1980 in Ireland
