= 1984 in Irish television =

List of years in Irish television	(table)
- … 1974; 1975; 1976; 1977; 1978; 1979; 1980; 1981; 1982; 1983; 1984; 1985; 1986; 1987; 1988; 1989; 1990; 1991; 1992; 1993; 1994 …
- Art; Archaeology; Architecture; Literature; Music; Philosophy; Science; +...

The following is a list of events relating to television in Ireland from 1984.

== Events ==
- 2 January – Jim Mitchell is appointed Minister for Communications with responsibility for broadcasting.
- February – Charlie Bird becomes the first reporter on RTÉ Television to present a news item via satellite, when he reports from the Philippines on the imprisonment, trial and subsequent release of Fr. Niall O'Brien.
- 1–4 June – RTÉ presents live coverage of U.S. President Ronald Reagan's visit to Ireland. RTÉ sends twice-daily newsfeeds to Eurovision for world distribution during the visit. The coverage includes an interview with Reagan recorded in Washington for the programme Today Tonight and a special edition of Newstime which is broadcast on U.S. television.

== Debuts ==
=== RTÉ 1 ===
- 25 June – (Canada) The Edison Twins (1984–1986)
- 29 June – (United Kingdom) The Doombolt Chase (1978)
- 16 July – (United States) Heathcliff and Marmaduke (1981)
- 2 November – Davis at Large (1984–1986)
- 24 December – (United Kingdom) The Snowman (1982)
- Undated – MT-USA (1984–1987)
- Undated - (United States) Masquerade (1983-1984)

=== RTÉ 2 ===
- 26 July – (United States) The Biskitts (1983–1984)
- 7 November – Leave It To Mrs O'Brien (1984–1986)

== Ongoing television programmes ==
=== 1960s ===
- RTÉ News: Nine O'Clock (1961–present)
- RTÉ News: Six One (1962–present)
- The Late Late Show (1962–present)

=== 1970s ===
- Sports Stadium (1973–1997)
- Trom agus Éadrom (1975–1985)
- The Late Late Toy Show (1975–present)
- RTÉ News on Two (1978–2014)
- Bosco (1979–1996)
- The Sunday Game (1979–present)

=== 1980s ===
- Today Tonight (1982–1992)
- Mailbag (1982–1996)
- The Irish R.M. (1983–1985)
- Glenroe (1983–2001)

== See also ==
- 1984 in Ireland
