= 1983 in Irish television =

List of years in Irish television	(table)
- … 1973; 1974; 1975; 1976; 1977; 1978; 1979; 1980; 1981; 1982; 1983; 1984; 1985; 1986; 1987; 1988; 1989; 1990; 1991; 1992; 1993 …
- Art; Archaeology; Architecture; Literature; Music; Philosophy; Science; +...

The following is a list of events relating to television in Ireland from 1983.

== Events ==
- 10 January – Satirical television programme Ballymagash premieres on RTÉ Television hosted by Frank Kelly.
- 11 September – The rural drama series Glenroe is first aired on RTÉ Television.
- 2 October – Murphy's Micro-Quiz-M is first aired. It is a quiz show which features the use of computers.
- 27 October – The International Council of the National Academy of Television Arts & Sciences of the United States presents Salute to Irish Television, an evening of RTÉ Television programmes, at the Lincoln Center in New York City.
- 29 October – The Late Late Show is broadcast live from New York.
- 24 November – Access Community Television, a series of programmes made by groups such as seminarians, young travellers and Garda trainees first goes on air.

== Debuts ==
=== RTÉ 1 ===
- 6 January – (United Kingdom) / (Republic of Ireland) The Irish R.M. (1983–1985)
- 10 January – Ballymagash (1983)
- 10 January – (Australia) / (United Kingdom) The Coral Island (1983)
- 11 January – (United Kingdom) Andy Robson (1982–1993)
- 17 January – (United States) The New Adventures of Mighty Mouse and Heckle & Jeckle (1979–1980)
- 14 March – (United Kingdom) Into the Labyrinth (1981–1982)
- 26 May – (New Zealand) Under the Mountain (1981)
- 21 July – (Australia) Come Midnight Monday (1982)
- 11 September – Glenroe (1983–2001)
- 1 November – (United States) Pandamonium (1982)
- 9 November – (Australia) The Nargun and the Stars (1981)
- Undated – Caught in a Free State (1983)
- Undated – (United States) The A-Team (1982–1987)

=== RTÉ 2 ===
- 15 April – (United Kingdom) Boys from the Blackstuff (1982)
- 21 April – (United Kingdom) Breakpoint (1982)
- 16 November – (United States) Manimal (1983)

== Ongoing television programmes ==
=== 1960s ===
- RTÉ News: Nine O'Clock (1961–present)
- RTÉ News: Six One (1962–present)
- The Late Late Show (1962–present)

=== 1970s ===
- Sports Stadium (1973–1997)
- Trom agus Éadrom (1975–1985)
- The Late Late Toy Show (1975–present)
- RTÉ News on Two (1978–2014)
- Bosco (1979–1996)
- The Sunday Game (1979–present)

=== 1980s ===
- Today Tonight (1982–1992)
- Mailbag (1982–1996)

== Ending this year ==
- 28 March – Ballymagash (1983)
- Unknown - Caught in a Free State (1983)

== Births ==
- 19 June – Aidan Turner, actor

== See also ==
- 1983 in Ireland
