= 1986 in Irish television =

List of years in Irish television	(table)
- … 1976; 1977; 1978; 1979; 1980; 1981; 1982; 1983; 1984; 1985; 1986; 1987; 1988; 1989; 1990; 1991; 1992; 1993; 1994; 1995; 1996 …
- Art; Archaeology; Architecture; Literature; Music; Philosophy; Science; +...

The following is a list of events relating to television in Ireland from 1986.

== Events ==
- January – RTE begins a six-week test of its teletext service Aertel, operating on RTE 1 between 2pm and closedown with a sample in-vision service broadcast on RTE2 between 2pm and 5,45pm.
- 29 September – Long running Irish afternoon chat show Live at 3 begins on RTÉ 1.
- 29 September – RTÉ Television airs the first edition of Dempsey's Den, a series presented by Ian Dempsey with puppets Zig and Zag. Dempsey's Den presented children's afternoon programmes.
- 1 October – Welsh children's animation SuperTed begins its screening debut on RTÉ 1 as part of Dempsey's Den. The series is translated and dubbed into an Irish language.
- 9 November – The current affairs series Questions and Answers first goes on air. It is presented by Olivia O'Leary.

== Debuts ==
=== RTÉ 1 ===
- 14 January – (United States) Alvin and the Chipmunks (Ruby Spears version) (1983–1987)
- 10 April – (Australia) Butterfly Island (1985–1987)
- 13 August – (Canada) / (Scotland) The Campbells (1986–1990)
- 11 September – Pajo's Junkbox (1986–1988)
- 29 September – Dempsey's Den (1986–2010)
- 29 September – Live at 3 (1986–1997)
- 30 September – Rapid Roulette (1986–1990)
- 30 September – (United Kingdom) The Prisoner of Zenda (1984)
- 1 October – (Wales) SuperTed (1983–1986)
- 13 October - Evening Extra (1986-1988)
- 25 October – Saturday Live (1986–1999)
- 9 November – Questions and Answers (1986–2009)
- Undated – (United States) Muppet Babies (1984–1991)

=== RTÉ 2 ===
- 30 September – (United States) Spaceflight (1985)
- 8 October – (United Kingdom) Chocky (1984)
- 9 October – (United States) Disney's Adventures of the Gummi Bears (1985–1991)
- 2 December – (United States) Starman (1986–1987)
- 25 December – (Wales) Fox Tales (1986–1988)

== Changes of network affiliation ==
Shows	Moved from	Moved to
(United States) Disney's Adventures of the Gummi Bears	RTÉ 2	RTÉ 1
(Germany) / (Japan) Maya the Honey Bee	RTÉ 1	RTÉ 2

== Ongoing television programmes ==
=== 1960s ===
- RTÉ News: Nine O'Clock (1961–present)
- RTÉ News: Six One (1962–present)
- The Late Late Show (1962–present)

=== 1970s ===
- Sports Stadium (1973–1997)
- The Late Late Toy Show (1975–present)
- RTÉ News on Two (1978–2014)
- Bosco (1979–1996)
- The Sunday Game (1979–present)

=== 1980s ===
- Today Tonight (1982–1992)
- Mailbag (1982–1996)
- Glenroe (1983–2001)
- MT-USA (1984–1987)

== Ending this year ==
- 23 February – Davis at Large (1984–1986)
- 23 April – Leave It To Mrs O'Brien (1984–1986)

== See also ==
- 1986 in Ireland
