= 1999 in Irish television =

List of years in Irish television	(table)
- … 1989; 1990; 1991; 1992; 1993; 1994; 1995; 1996; 1997; 1998; 1999; 2000; 2001; 2002; 2003; 2004; 2005; 2006; 2007; 2008; 2009 …
- Art; Archaeology; Architecture; Literature; Music; Philosophy; Science; +...

The following is a list of events relating to television in Ireland from 1999.

== Events ==
=== January ===
- No events

=== February ===
- 1 February – RTÉ News Online is launched.

=== March ===
- 10 March – US animated comedy series South Park premieres in Ireland for the very first time on TV3.

=== April ===
- No events

=== May ===
- 6 May – CableLink, the cable television company which is part owned by RTÉ is sold to NTL Communications for more than £535 million.
- 14 May – Sunday Independent journalist Terry Keane discusses her affair with former Taoiseach Charles Haughey during an edition of The Late Late Show.
- 21 May – Gay Byrne presents his final edition of The Late Late Show on RTÉ Television.

=== June ===
- 28 June – Launch of TV You (later UTV2) in Northern Ireland. The channel's programme content is primarily simulcast with ITV2 in London. However, unusually for a commercial station, it does not carry any advertising.
- Unknown – Final episode of Echo Island is screened on Network 2.
- Summer – Helen O'Rahilly is appointed as the first female Director of Television at RTÉ. She left in 2000 to take up a position at the BBC in London.

=== August ===
- 4 August TnaG rebrands to TG4
- 9 August – Long running UK animated series for children Bob the Builder begins its first ever broadcast on Irish television with the series going to air on Network 2 as part of Den2.

=== September ===
- 3 September – The iconic anime Pokémon has been picked by Network 2 to be transmitted on Irish television.
- 6 September – Reeling in the Years, a documentary series that talks about music over the years is officially launched on RTÉ 1.
- 6 September – Gay Byrne who has retired as hosting The Late Late Show since its premiere in 1962 presents a brand new short-lived comedy show called Make 'Em Laugh which airs on RTÉ 1. The series however only lasted for one series consisting of only eight episodes.
- 6 September – The long running UK children's television series Teletubbies premieres on Irish television for the very first time ever as the series itself begins airing on Network 2 as part of their Den2 programme (although people who have access to British television broadcasting were to see earlier transmissions of the series). One of The Disney Channel's most famous and popular children's series Bear in the Big Blue House also makes its first ever broadcast on Network 2 on the very same day.
- 10 September – Pat Kenny succeeds Gay Byrne as presenter of The Late Late Show.

=== October ===
- 1 October – Despite airing in Northern Ireland and several parts of Ireland with access to UK television networks since its television debut in 1963, the long running UK science fiction series Doctor Who finally airs in the Republic of Ireland for the first time ever on TG4. The series will be paired up with the 1940 film Flash Gordon Conquers the Universe as part of the Sci-Fi block Back to the Future. However seeing as Flash Gordon Conquers the Universe won't be broadcast for the first two weeks, a double bill of Doctor Who will be shown instead to fill the hour slot. Spearhead from Space the very first serial of the seventh season and the first serial to star Jon Pertwee as the Third Doctor will be the very first Doctor Who serial to be shown in Ireland.
- 15 October – Doctor Who, the long running UK science fiction series will start at an earlier time of 6:31pm on TG4. It will be billed as running for an hour, followed by Flash Gordon Conquers the Universe which ends at 8:00pm. The serial it will be showing is parts 1 and 2 of the second serial of Season 7 Doctor Who and the Silurians.

=== November ===
- 4 November – The Broadcasting Bill is presented in the Dáil, addressing the emergence of digital media. The Bill also establishes the Broadcasting Commission of Ireland.

=== December ===
- 31 December – RTÉ presents Millennium Eve: Celebrate 2000, coverage of the turn of the millennium from 31 December 1999 into 1 January 2000. The programme is part of the international strand 2000 Today to celebrate the occasion.

== Debuts ==
=== RTÉ ===
- 4 January – Timbuctoo on RTÉ Two (1998–2000)
- 5 January – No Sweat on RTÉ Two (1997–1998)
- 12 January – CatDog on RTÉ Two (1998–2005)
- 13 January – The Animal Shelf on RTÉ Two (1997–2000)
- 19 January – Steven Spielberg Presents Toonsylvania on RTÉ Two (1998–1999)
- 20 January – Pinky, Elmyra & the Brain on RTÉ Two (1998–1999)
- 25 January – The Wubbulous World of Dr. Seuss on RTÉ Two (1996–1998)
- 20 February – The Adventures of Rocky and Bullwinkle and Friends on RTÉ Two (1959–1964)
- 22 March – Earth: Final Conflict on RTÉ Two (1997–2002)
- 26 March – Caillou on RTÉ Two (1997–2010)
- April – States of Fear (1999)
- 1 April – Kit and Kaboodle on RTÉ Two (1998–1999)
- 12 April – Pocket Dragon Adventures on RTÉ Two (1998–1999)
- 12 April – The Worst Witch on RTÉ Two (1998–2001)
- 1 May – Walter Melon on RTÉ Two (1998)
- 8 May – All Dogs Go to Heaven: The Series on RTÉ Two (1996–1998)
- 11 May – The New Addams Family on RTÉ Two (1998–1999)
- 15 May – Oggy and the Cockroaches on RTÉ Two (1998–present)
- 8 June – Bimble's Bucket on RTÉ Two (1996–1998)
- 8 June – Lavender Castle on RTÉ Two (1999–2000)
- 8 June – The California Raisin Show on RTÉ Two (1989)
- 17 June – Fennec on RTÉ Two (1997–1998)
- 25 June – Anthony Ant on RTÉ Two (1999)
- 26 June – Extreme Dinosaurs on RTÉ Two (1997)
- 12 July – The Magician on RTÉ Two (1997–1999)
- 9 August – Bob the Builder on RTÉ Two (1999–2012, 2015–present)
- September – Telly Bingo on RTÉ One (1999–present)
- 3 September – Pokémon on RTÉ Two (1997–present)
- 6 September – Reeling in the Years on RTÉ One (1999–present)
- 6 September – Bear in the Big Blue House on RTÉ Two (1997–2006)
- 6 September – Make 'Em Laugh on RTÉ One (1999)
- 6 September – Teletubbies on RTÉ Two (1997–2001, 2015–present)
- 7 September – Pippi Longstocking on RTÉ Two (1997–1998)
- 7 September – The New Woody Woodpecker Show on RTÉ Two (1999–2002)
- 15 September – {Mystic Knights of Tir Na Nog on RTÉ Two (1998–1999)
- 7 October – RoboCop: Alpha Commando on RTÉ Two (1998–1999)
- 13 October – Princess Sissi on RTÉ Two (1997–1998)
- 28 October – Animorphs on RTÉ Two (1998–1999)
- 4 November – Bull Island on RTÉ One (1999–2001)
- 11 November – Mopatop's Shop on RTÉ Two (1999–2005)
- 6 December – Rolie Polie Olie on RTÉ Two (1998–2004)
- 24 December – Scrooge Koala's Christmas on RTÉ Two (1997)
- 24 December – Mumfie's White Christmas on RTÉ Two (1995)
- 25 December – The True Meaning of Crumbfest on RTÉ Two (1998)
- Undated – Open House on RTÉ One (1999–2004)
- Undated – The View on RTÉ Two (1999–2011)
- Undated – Wanderlust on RTÉ Two (1999–2002)
- Undated – Will & Grace (1998–2006, 2017–present)
- Undated – That '70s Show (1998–2006)
- Undated – Pepper Ann on RTÉ Two (1997–2000)
- Undated - Felicity (1998-2002)

=== TV3 ===
- 10 March – South Park (1997–present)
- 20 March – The Hot Rod Dogs and Cool Car Cats (1995–1996)
- 23 March – Captain Star (1997–1998)
- 26 March – The Legend of Calamity Jane (1997–1998)
- 31 March – Rocko's Modern Life (1993–1996)
- 12 April – First Edition (1999–2001)
- 12 April – A Game of Two Halves (1999)
- 12 April – TV3 News @ 7 (1999–2000)
- 5 June – Space Cases (1996–1997)
- 31 July – Godzilla: The Series (1998–2000)
- 1 August – Birdz (1998)
- 1 August – Flying Rhino Junior High (1998–2000)
- 28 August – Anatole (1998–2000)
- 20 September – Ireland AM (1999–present)
- 20 September – Professor Bubble (1996–1997)
- 1 November – Mole in the Hole (1996)
- 21 November – Agenda (1999–2004)
- 25 December – Buster & Chauncey's Silent Night (1998)

=== Teilifís na Gaeilge/TG4 ===
- 1 October – Doctor Who (1963–1989, 1996, 2005–present)
- 31 December – Gogwana (1998)
- Undated – Witch World (1998)

=== BBC ===
- Undated – Patrick Kielty Almost Live on BBC One (1999–2003)

== Changes of network affiliation ==
Shows	Moved from	Moved to
Teletubbies	Network 2	TG4
Prince Cinders	RTÉ One	TV3
Bouli	TG4	Network 2
Simba: The King Lion	TG4	Network 2
Babar	RTÉ One	Network 2
Santo Bugito	Network 2	TV3
The Animals of Farthing Wood	TG4	Network 2

== Ongoing television programmes ==
=== 1960s ===
- RTÉ News: Nine O'Clock (1961–present)
- RTÉ News: Six One (1962–present)
- The Late Late Show (1962–present)

=== 1970s ===
- The Late Late Toy Show (1975–present)
- RTÉ News on Two (1978–2014)
- The Sunday Game (1979–present)

=== 1980s ===
- Glenroe (1983–2001)
- Questions and Answers (1986–2009)
- Dempsey's Den (1986–2010)
- Fair City (1989–present)
- RTÉ News: One O'Clock (1989–present)

=== 1990s ===
- Would You Believe (1990s–present)
- Winning Streak (1990–present)
- Challenging Times (1991–2001)
- Prime Time (1992–present)
- The Movie Show (1993–2001)
- No Disco (1993–2003)
- Nuacht RTÉ (1995–present)
- Fame and Fortune (1996–2006)
- Nuacht TG4 (1996–present)
- Ros na Rún (1996–present)
- Later on 2 (1997–2000)
- Don't Feed the Gondolas (1997–2001)
- A Scare at Bedtime (1997–2006)
- 2Phat (1998–2000)
- The Premiership/Premier Soccer Saturday (1998–2013)
- Sports Tonight (1998–2009)
- TV3 News (1998–present)

== Ending this year ==
- 11 April – TV3 News @ 6 (1998–1999)
- 22 May – Kenny Live (1988–1999)
- May – PM Live (1997–1999)
- May – States of Fear (1999)
- June – Echo Island (1994–1999)
- 5 July – A Game of Two Halves (1999)
- 25 October – Make 'Em Laugh (1999)
- 18 December – Saturday Live (1986–1999)
- Undated – Speakeasy (1998–1999)
- Undated – Gimme 3 (1998–1999)

== See also ==
- 1999 in Ireland
