= 1980s in Irish television =

For articles on Irish television in the 1980s please see:

- 1980 in Irish television
- 1981 in Irish television
- 1982 in Irish television
- 1983 in Irish television
- 1984 in Irish television
- 1985 in Irish television
- 1986 in Irish television
- 1987 in Irish television
- 1988 in Irish television
- 1989 in Irish television
