= 1998 in Irish television =

List of years in Irish television	(table)
- … 1988; 1989; 1990; 1991; 1992; 1993; 1994; 1995; 1996; 1997; 1998; 1999; 2000; 2001; 2002; 2003; 2004; 2005; 2006; 2007; 2008 …
- Art; Archaeology; Architecture; Literature; Music; Philosophy; Science; +...

The following is a list of events relating to television in Ireland from 1998.

== Events ==
- 29 May – Ray D'Arcy leaves Den TV after hosting the long running wacky children's programme for 9 years since 1990.
- 10 June – The Irish version of The Animals of Farthing Wood airs on television once again with reruns of the dub showing on Teilifís na Gaeilge. The Irish language television channel will also continue airing the series until 1999 although the English version will continue airing on RTÉ for many years to come.
- 13 August – First showing on Irish television of US teen drama Dawson's Creek on Network 2.
- 20 September – Launch of TV3, the Republic of Ireland's first commercial television channel. Early programming on the channel includes the UK soap EastEnders, the miniseries Merlin, the film The Quick and the Dead, US comedy Just Shoot Me, and Breakers, a new Australian soap. The channel is aimed at the 15–44 age group and also has a remit for 15% of its programming to be homegrown – rising to 25% within five years.
- 1 October – Digital satellite television launches in the Republic of Ireland, operated by Sky Digital.
- 1 October – TV3 reports an audience share of 927,000 (7% of viewers) for its first week on air, passing its intended initial target of a 6% audience share.

== Debuts ==
=== RTÉ ===
- 3 January – Darkwing Duck on Network 2 (1991–1992)
- 4 January – Saban's Adventures of Oliver Twist on Network 2 (1996–1997)
- 5 January – Veronica's Closet on Network 2 (1997–2000)
- 6 January – Cow and Chicken on Network 2 (1997–1999)
- 7 January – Dharma & Greg on Network 2 (1997–2002)
- 8 January – Ally McBeal on Network 2 (1997–2002)
- 8 January – Spellbinder: Land of the Dragon Lord on Network 2 (1997)
- 9 January – Kenan & Kel on Network 2 (1996–2001)
- 10 January – Men in Black: The Series on Network 2 (1997–2001)
- 15 January – The Adventures of Paddington Bear on Network 2 (1997–2000)
- 23 January – What-a-Mess (Series 3) on Network 2 (1995–1996)
- 19 February – Extreme Ghostbusters on Network 2 (1997)
- 22 February – The Untouchables of Elliot Mouse on Network 2 (1996–1997)
- 24 February – Return to the Magic Library on Network 2 (1989)
- 2 March – The Adventures of Swiss Family Robinson on Network 2 (1998)
- 21 March – Little Wizards on Network 2 (1987–1988)
- 8 April – Mirror, Mirror II on Network 2 (1997–1998)
- 8 April – The Wombles on Network 2 (1998–2002)
- 10 April – Lizzie's Library on Network 2 (1995)
- 11 April – Mighty Ducks on Network 2 (1996–1997)
- 25 April – The Mozart Band on Network 2 (1995)
- 2 May – The Blobs on Network 2 (1997)
- 8 May – Roger and the Rottentrolls on Network 2 (1996–2000)
- 30 May – The New World of the Gnomes on Network 2 (1997)
- 2 June – Orson and Olivia on Network 2 (1993)
- 1 August – The Country Mouse and the City Mouse Adventures on Network 2 (1997–1998)
- 1 August – Mighty Max on Network 2 (1993–1994)
- 1 August – Skippy: Adventures in Bushtown on Network 2 (1998–1999)
- 6 August – Escape from Jupiter on Network 2 (1994–1995)
- 13 August – Dawson's Creek on Network 2 (1998–2003)
- 22 August – What-a-Mess (Series 2) on Network 2 (1990)
- 27 August – Return to Jupiter on Network 2 (1997)
- 8 September – Renford Rejects on Network 2 (1998–2001)
- 9 September – Hero Turtles: The Next Mutation on Network 2 (1997–1998)
- 10 September – The Wild Thornberrys on Network 2 (1998–2004)
- 13 September – PB&J Otter on Network 2 (1998–2000)
- 14 September – Gridlock (1998)
- 16 September – Oscar and Friends on Network 2 (1996)
- 18 September – 2Phat on Network 2 (1998–2000)
- 28 September – The Forgotten Toys on Network 2 (1998–1999)
- September – The Premiership/Premier Soccer Saturday on RTÉ 1 (1998–2013)
- 8 December – The Adventures of Dawdle the Donkey on Network 2 (1996–1998)
- Undated – Recess on Network 2 (1997–2001)
- Undated – Murder Call on Network 2 (1997–2000)
- Undated – The New Batman Adventures on Network 2 (1997–1999)
- Undated – USA High (1997–1999)
- Undated – Hang Time (1995–2000)

=== TV3 ===
- 20 September – TV3 News @ 6 (1998–1999)
- 20 September – TV3 News (1998–present)
- 20 September – Just Shoot Me! (1997–2003)
- 20 September – Merlin (1998)
- 20 September – Sports Tonight (1998–2009)
- 21 September – Gimme 3 (1998–1999)
- 21 September – Breakers (1998–1999)
- 21 September – EastEnders (1985–present)
- 21 September – Sunset Beach (1997–1999)
- 21 September – The Ren and Stimpy Show (1991–1996)
- 21 September – Speakeasy (1998–1999)
- 21 September – Something So Right (1996–1998)
- 21 September – Conan the Adventurer (1992–1993)
- 24 September – Buffy the Vampire Slayer (1997–2003)
- 26 September – Conan and the Young Warriors (1994)
- 26 September – Salty's Lighthouse (1997–1998)
- 26 September – Avenger Penguins (1993–1994)
- 26 September – Loggerheads (1998–1999)
- 26 September – Aaahh!!! Real Monsters (1994–1997)
- 27 September – Transformers: Generation 2 (1992–1994)
- 27 September – The Adventures of Pete and Pete (1991–1996)
- 27 September – Animal Crackers (1997–1999)

=== Teilifís na Gaeilge ===
- 16 January – Tabaluga (1994–2004)
- 29 September – Power Rangers Turbo (1997)
- 3 October – S.O.S. Croco (1998)

=== BBC ===
- Undated – Give My Head Peace on BBC One (1998–2008)

== Changes of network affiliation ==
Shows	Moved from	Moved to
The Animals of Farthing Wood	Network 2	Teilifís na Gaeilge
Rupert	RTÉ 1	Network 2
The Snowman	Network 2	TV3
We Wish You a Merry Christmas	Network 2	TV3
Mole's Christmas	Network 2	TV3
A Pup Named Scooby-Doo	RTÉ1	Network 2
Jolly Old St. Nicholas	Network 2	TV3
Seinfeld	Network 2	TV3
The Sweeney	RTÉ 1	TV3
The Simpsons	RTÉ 1	Network 2
Magic Adventures of Mumfie	Teilifís na Gaeilge	Network 2
Fievel's American Tails	RTÉ 1	Network 2
Romuald the Reindeer	Teilifís na Gaeilge	Network 2
Blue Heelers	RTÉ 1	Network 2

== Ongoing television programmes ==
=== 1960s ===
- RTÉ News: Nine O'Clock (1961–present)
- RTÉ News: Six One (1962–present)
- The Late Late Show (1962–present)

=== 1970s ===
- The Late Late Toy Show (1975–present)
- RTÉ News on Two (1978–2014)
- The Sunday Game (1979–present)

=== 1980s ===
- Glenroe (1983–2001)
- Saturday Live (1986–1999)
- Questions and Answers (1986–2009)
- Dempsey's Den (1986–2010)
- Kenny Live (1988–1999)
- Fair City (1989–present)
- RTÉ News: One O'Clock (1989–present)

=== 1990s ===
- Would You Believe (1990s–present)
- Winning Streak (1990–present)
- Challenging Times (1991–2001)
- Prime Time (1992–present)
- The Movie Show (1993–2001)
- No Disco (1993–2003)
- Echo Island (1994–1999)
- Nuacht RTÉ (1995–present)
- Fame and Fortune (1996–2006)
- Nuacht TG4 (1996–present)
- Ros na Rún (1996–present)
- PM Live (1997–1999)
- Later on 2 (1997–2000)
- Don't Feed the Gondolas (1997–2001)
- A Scare at Bedtime (1997–2006)

== Ending this year ==
- 29 April – The Swamp Shop (1997–1998)
- 1 April – Know Your Sport (1987–1998)
- 17 April – Brendan O'Carroll's Hot Milk and Pepper (1996–1998)
- 15 May – The Morbegs (1996–1998)

== Deaths ==
- 28 February – Dermot Morgan, 45, comedian and actor

== See also ==
- 1998 in Ireland
