= 1990s in Irish television =

For articles on Irish television in the 1990s please see:

- 1990 in Irish television
- 1991 in Irish television
- 1992 in Irish television
- 1993 in Irish television
- 1994 in Irish television
- 1995 in Irish television
- 1996 in Irish television
- 1997 in Irish television
- 1998 in Irish television
- 1999 in Irish television
