= Before 1960 in Irish television =

List of years in Irish television:
1957 1958 1959 – 1950s – 1960 1961 1962

The following is a list of events related to television in Ireland during the 1950s. The television service for the Irish Republic did not begin until 1961, but preparations for its introduction were being made throughout the 1950s, while in Northern Ireland the first television service came on air in 1955 with the launch of the BBC television service for Northern Ireland.

== Events ==
=== 1953 ===
- September – The Posts and Telegraphs committee, assigned the task of planning for the introduction of a television service for the Republic of Ireland presents its report to the Government.

=== 1954 ===
- 2 June – Michael Keyes is appointed Minister for Posts and Telegraphs.

=== 1955 ===
- 21 July – The BBC brings into service its Divis transmitter, its first permanent 405-line VHF Band I facility serving Northern Ireland, marking the launch of a television service for Northern Ireland; the 35 kW transmissions can also be readily received in much of the Republic of Ireland.
- The first television broadcast from the Irish Republic – a boxing match between Ireland and England at the National Stadium in Dublin – is relayed by the BBC via Belfast and Scotland to several European countries.

=== 1956 ===
- The Posts and Telegraphs committee presents a second report to Government, recommending a publicly funded service.
- 20 March – Neil Blaney is appointed Minister for Posts and Telegraphs.
- 4 December – John Ormonde appointed Minister for Posts and Telegraphs.

=== 1958 ===
- Seán MacEntee, Minister for Finance, establishes a commission to investigate the provision of a television service. Recommendations include a public authority be established to run the service and that no capital or current account investment come from government.
- 1958–1959 – Schemes submitted to the Television Commission for a national television service include proposals from Pye Ltd., Thomson, and Gael Linn.

=== 1959 ===
- 8 May – The Television Commission submits its final report.
- 23 June – Michael Hilliard is appointed Minister for Posts and Telegraphs.
- July – Under the leadership of newly appointed Taoiseach Seán Lemass, the Cabinet rejects the findings of the Television Commission, and instead recommends that a television service should be included with radio as part of a single public statutory authority.
- 24 August – Maurice Gorham resigns as Director of Broadcasting.
- September – An Advisory Committee, Chaired by broadcaster Eamonn Andrews is established to prepare for the introduction of a television service.
- 31 October – Ulster Television, the ITV franchise for Northern Ireland, goes on air.
