= 1966 in Irish television =

The following is a list of events relating to television in Ireland from 1966.

== Events ==
- January – Playboy executive Victor Lownes is forced to cancel an appearance on The Late Late Show after telling reporters he is in Ireland to recruit Irish bunny girls for Playboy clubs in the United Kingdom.
- February – A Bishop calls on "all decent Irish Catholics" to protest following a Mr & Mrs sketch on The Late Late Show in which Gay Byrne asks the female contestant about the colour of her nightie. The call is largely ignored, but the affair becomes known as The Bishop and the Nightie affair.
- 8 March – The Broadcast Authority (Amendment) Act comes into law, changing the corporate name of Radio Éireann to Radio Telefís Éireann.
- 10 April – RTÉ's current affairs programme, Seven Days is first aired.
- 10–17 April – RTÉ Television airs the dramas Insurrection and Cuimhneacháin 1916 to commemorate the 50th anniversary of the Easter Rising.
- May 1966 – Todd Andrews is appointed Chairman of the RTÉ Authority following the resignation of the previous incumbent Eamonn Andrews.
- 10 November – Erskine Childers is appointed Minister for Posts and Telegraphs.

== Debuts ==
- 10 April – Seven Days (1966–1976)
- 24 April – (United States) Gumby (1956–1957, 1960–1969, 1987–1989)

== Ongoing television programmes ==
- RTÉ News: Nine O'Clock (1961–present)
- Dáithí Lacha (1962–1969)
- RTÉ News: Six One (1962–present)
- The Late Late Show (1962–present)
- Tolka Row (1964–1968)
- Newsbeat (1964–1971)
- The Riordans (1965–1979)
- Quicksilver (1965–1981)

== Births ==
- Undated – David McWilliams, journalist and economist

== See also ==
- 1966 in Ireland
