= 1991 in Irish television =

The following is a list of events relating to television in Ireland from 1991.

== Events ==
- 7 January – The British children's animated fantasy series The Dreamstone premieres on Network 2. It had premiered in the UK during the previous year and four months.
- 30 January – Proceedings from the Dáil Éireann, the lower house of the Irish parliament are aired on a regular basis.
- 7 February – Séamus Brennan is appointed Minister for Tourism, Transport and Communications with responsibility for broadcasting.
- 26 March – Network 2 begins airing the popular French-Canadian children's television series Babar.
- 18 April – The American/French/Canadian animated series Inspector Gadget screens on Network 2 in its original English language for the very last time before resting. It will return to Irish television in 1996 on the newly launched Irish language television network Teilifís na Gaeilge (later TG4 in 1999) with the series being dubbed and translated into Irish before airing on Network 2 once again in English on 22 December 2000 three days before Christmas.
- 5 September – A British drama series for older children and young teens, Runaway Bay, begins on Network 2. It aired there before airing in its original country, where it would not be broadcast until the following January.
- 18 September – The very first episode of Irish game show Blackboard Jungle goes on air on Network 2.
- 6 November – The Australian children's television series Johnson and Friends receives its first ever Irish television screening on Network 2.
- 24 December – The second Postman Pat special Postman Pat and the Toy Soldiers airs on Network 2 which won't be airing in the UK until 2 January 1992.
- 27 December – The very first Postman Pat special Postman Pat Takes the Bus is screened on Network 2 2 days after its UK television premiere.

== Debuts ==
=== RTÉ 1 ===
- 19 January – Nellie the Elephant (1990–1991)
- 26 January – Bertie the Bat (1990)
- 4 March – The Great Escape II: The Untold Story (1988)
- 6 April – Satellite City (1988)
- 14 April – // The Adventures of the Black Stallion (1990–1993)
- 29 June – / Rocky Hollow (1985–1986)
- 4 July – Casper and Friends (1990)
- 28 September – The Shoe People (1987)
- 5 December – The Treaty (1991)
- 23 December – Father Christmas (1991)
- Undated – Challenging Times (1991–2001)

=== Network 2 ===
- 7 January – The Dreamstone (1990–1995)
- 16 January – / Sharky & George (1990–1991)
- 22 January – Cop Rock (1990)
- January – / The Boy from Andromeda (1991)
- 26 February – The Girl from Tomorrow (1990)
- 1 March – Dink, the Little Dinosaur (1989–1990)
- 17 March – Chimpmates (1976–1978)
- 26 March – / Babar (1989–1991)
- 2 April – Garfield and Friends (1988–1994)
- 7 May – The Wizard of Oz (1990)
- 17 May – / Potsworth & Co (1990)
- 17 May – Joe 90 (1968–1969)
- 14 June – Charlie Chalk (1988–1989)
- 9 July – American Dreamer (1990–1991)
- 26 August – / Emlyn's Moon (1990)
- 2 September – Bouli (1989–1991)
- 3 September – Tiny Toon Adventures (1990–1992)
- 3 September – Round the Twist (1989–2001)
- 4 September – Sniffles (1939–1946)
- 4 September – Chipmunks Go to the Movies (1990)
- 4 September – / Jim Henson's Mother Goose Stories (1988)
- 5 September – Press Gang (1989–1993)
- 5 September – We All Have Tales (1991–1994)
- 5 September – The Magic Crown (1989–1990)
- 5 September – Runaway Bay (1992–1993)
- 6 September – Josie Smith (1989–1992)
- 13 September – Slimer! and the Real Ghostbusters (1988–1991)
- 18 September – Blackboard Jungle (1991–1997)
- 20 September – / The Smoggies (1988–1991)
- 23 October – Happy Castle (1989–1990)
- 6 November – Johnson and Friends (1990–1997)
- 20 November – Time Riders (1991)
- 26 November – // Clowning Around (1991)
- 12 December – Barriers (1981–1982)
- 18 December – Pink Panther and Sons (1984–1985)
- 23 December – / The Pillow People Save Christmas (1987)
- 24 December – Brown Bear's Wedding (1991)
- 24 December – Postman Pat and the Toy Soldiers (1992)
- 25 December – Jingle Bell Rap (1991)
- 27 December – Postman Pat Takes the Bus (1991)
- Undated - Widget the World Watcher (1990-1991)
- Undated - Beverly Hills 90210 (1990-2000)

== Changes of network affiliation ==
Shows	Moved from	Moved to
Knots Landing	RTÉ1	Network 2
SuperTed	Network 2	RTÉ1
/ The World of David the Gnome	RTÉ1	Network 2
Teenage Mutant Hero Turtles	Network 2	RTÉ1
Mike and Angelo	RTÉ1	Network 2
Charlie Chalk	Network 2	RTÉ1
Edward and Friends	Network 2	RTÉ1
All Change	Network 2	RTÉ1
Alvin and the Chipmunks (Murakami Wolf Swenson/DiC version)	RTÉ1	Network 2
Bosco	Network 2	RTÉ1
/ Ulysses 31	RTÉ1	Network 2
Kaboodle	RTÉ1	Network 2
Casper and Friends	RTÉ1	Network 2
T-Bag	Network 2	RTÉ1
The Doombolt Chase	RTÉ1	Network 2

== Ongoing television programmes ==
=== 1960s ===
- RTÉ News: Nine O'Clock (1961–present)
- RTÉ News: Six One (1962–present)
- The Late Late Show (1962–present)

=== 1970s ===
- Sports Stadium (1973–1997)
- The Late Late Toy Show (1975–present)
- RTÉ News on Two (1978–2014)
- Bosco (1979–1996)
- The Sunday Game (1979–present)

=== 1980s ===
- Today Tonight (1982–1992)
- Mailbag (1982–1996)
- Glenroe (1983–2001)
- Live at 3 (1986–1997)
- Saturday Live (1986–1999)
- Questions and Answers (1986–2009)
- Dempsey's Den (1986–2010)
- Marketplace (1987–1996)
- Where in the World? (1987–1996)
- Know Your Sport (1987–1998)
- Nighthawks (1988–1992)
- Jo Maxi (1988–1993)
- Where in the World? (1987–2006)
- Know Your Sport (1987–1998)
- Kenny Live (1988–1999)
- Fair City (1989–present)
- RTÉ News: One O'Clock (1989–present)

=== 1990s ===
- Would You Believe (1990s–present)
- Secrets (1990–1993)
- Winning Streak (1990–present)

== Births ==
- 28 February – Sarah Bolger, actress

== See also ==
- 1991 in Ireland
