= Eileen Reid =

Irish singer of the showband era (born 1943)

- Born: January 1943 (age 83); Dublin, Ireland
- Occupation: Singer
- Instrument: Vocals
- Years active: 1959–1980

Eileen Reid (born January 1943) is an Irish singer of the showband era.

She had an Irish number 1 on 29 May 1964 with "Fallen Star", the first official Irish number one single by an Irish woman, and was also known for her song "I Gave My Wedding Dress Away".

== Career ==
Eileen Reid began singing as a teenager with the Melody Makers, later fronting the Cadets showband. She and the Cadets reached No. 42 on the UK Singles Chart dated 6 May 1965 with "Jealous Heart".

She tried out for the 1980 Eurovision with "The Saddest Show On Earth". In 1982, she appeared on The Brendan Grace Show. She appeared on a 1995 episode of Lifelines.

Later she turned to acting, appearing in the Gaiety Theatre, Dublin in pantomime.

In 2008, she appeared on The Podge and Rodge Show.

== Personal life ==
Eileen Reid was the daughter of footballer Charlie Reid. Eileen Reid married Jimmy Day, another showband singer. Her daughter Claudine Day is also a singer.

In 2015, she admitted to multiple infidelities and a miscarriage.

== Discography ==
Irish chart singles

- 1964 "Fallen Star" (number 1)

== Bibliography ==
- Eileen (with Jimmy Day), Town House Dublin, 1995, ISBN 1-86059-011-X

== Filmography ==
- Misses Quirke in The Commitments
- Mrs. Rock in A Man of No Importance
- Woman with smallpox in Moll Flanders (1996 film)
- The Late Late Show, 14 May 2004
- Inside 252, 14 May 2004
- The Journey Home, EWTN, 17 July 2006
- The Podge and Rodge Show, 26 February 2008
