= Bunny Carr =

Irish television presenter (1927–2018)

- Born: Bernard Carr; 31 July 1927; Dublin, Ireland
- Died: 19 September 2018 (aged 91); Dublin, Ireland
- Known for: Quicksilver
- Spouse: Joan Carr (died 2005)

Bernard "Bunny" Carr (31 July 1927 – 19 September 2018) was an Irish television presenter. He presented shows such as Quicksilver, Teen Talk and Going Strong on RTÉ. He later set up his own communications and public relations company.

== Early life ==
Bernard Carr was born and raised in Clontarf, Dublin. His father, James Carr, was a civil servant who had served in the British Army in India. Bunny later recalled that his father hated his job and unfortunately died before he could retire. Bunny vowed never to be in the same position himself.

The Carr family lived in Clontarf and he attended O'Connell School where he was taught through the medium of Irish. One of the nuns at school gave him his nickname of "Bunny" on account of the size of his ears. Carr grew up with a love of amateur dramatics.

== Career ==
After leaving school he became a bank clerk for the Bank of Ireland and was eventually posted to Ballinasloe "because he spoke Irish". Once he had returned to Dublin, he realised that wanted to change track and successfully auditioned for RTÉ just before it launched in 1962. He later recounted that he had no strong desire to work in television but knew that he "just didn't want to work in the bank".

On RTÉ, he hosted such shows as Quicksilver and Going Strong. In 1964, he won a Jacob's Award for his television series, Teen Talk. He devised and presented the political interview programme The Politicians.

In 1973, Carr founded Carr Communications a public relations and communications training company, the first of its kind in Ireland.

The company grew to become one of the largest public relations and executive coaching firms in the country - it trained six of Ireland's Taoisigh (prime ministers). Carr also worked with the Catholic Communications Centre to train priests and nuns on how to make media appearances. Carr was involved with the Gorta organisation in the early 1980s as a public supporter and fundraiser, and rumours circulated that he had absconded with funds. He left RTÉ in the mid 1980s to concentrate on his business and retired in 2004.

== Personal life and death ==
Carr was married to Joan, who he noticed whilst she was climbing onto the roof of the pavilion to retrieve a ball at Sutton Tennis club. They had one son, Alan and two daughters, Carolyn and Philomena. She contracted polio during her pregnancy with Philomena, after having cleaned down Alan who fell into a former cess pit in the back garden. She was confined to an iron lung for the remaining seven months of the pregnancy and afterwards had to use a wheelchair. The couple lived in Sutton, Dublin, before Joan died in 2005, after which Bunny lived alone. He had 11 grandchildren.

In 1998 Carr suffered a heart attack and had cancer diagnosed by chance during the treatment. Carr was diagnosed with macular degeneration in 2011 and was registered blind. He died on 19 September 2018, aged 91 in Howth Hill Nursing Home in Dublin. His family requested that donations in his memory be made to a charity supporting sufferers of Pitt–Hopkins syndrome.
