= Fallen Star (song) =

1957 country music song written by James Joiner

Single by Eileen Reid and the Cadets
- B-side: "Heartbreak U.S.A."
- Released: March 1964
- Recorded: March 1964
- Studio: Silverpine Studios, Bray
- Genre: Country; showband
- Length: 2:58
- Label: Columbia
- Songwriter(s): James Joiner

"A Fallen Star" is an American country music song written by James Joiner (b. Florence, Alabama, July 10, 1928 - July 21, 2006).

The song was first released, as "A Fallen Star", by Bobby E. Denton ("The Singing Senator") in April 1957, soon followed by Jimmy C. Newman on April 27, 1957. The song has also been recorded by Ferlin Husky (May 1957), Conway Twitty (June 1961), Kitty Wells (Feb. 1962), Jim Reeves (March 1962), Jimmie Rodgers (1964), Webb Pierce (June 1966), Jan Howard (Oct. 16, 1967), B. J. Thomas (1967), David Houston (Jan. 1969), Jessi Colter (1981), and many others.

The song was also recorded, as "Fallen Star", by Irish singer Eileen Reid and The Cadets (March 1964), with Pat Murphy's harmonica opening the song. Recording took place at the Silverpine Studios in Bray, County Wicklow. The song reached Number 1 in the Irish Singles Chart on 29 May 1964, equal with Dickie Rock's "I'm Yours". It was the first song by an Irish woman to reach No. 1 in Ireland.
