= 1994 in Irish television =

The following is a list of events relating to television in Ireland from 1994.

== Events ==
- 3 January – American animated television series Animaniacs begins on Network 2.
- 19 January – The Minister for Arts, Culture and the Gaeltacht, Michael D. Higgins repeals Section 31 of the Broadcasting Authority Act.
- 10 March – The first rerun of the British children's television series Postman Pat is shown for the last time on Network 2. The series will be repeated again from 10 December 1996.
- 22 March – British television series for preschoolers Tots TV debuts on Network 2.
- 9 April – After three months of airing on the BBC in United Kingdom, the second series of the British children's animated television series The Animals of Farthing Wood is shown on Irish television for the first time, with the series being translated into an Irish language once again. The second series was shown RTÉ1.
- 30 April – Ireland hosts the Eurovision Song Contest, and wins for the third year in succession. The event is presented by Gerry Ryan and Cynthia Ní Mhurchú from Dublin's Point Theatre, and the winning song is Rock 'n' Roll Kids, composed by Brendan Graham, and performed by Paul Harrington and Charlie McGettigan. "Riverdance" by Bill Whelan is introduced as the interval act, and goes on to achieve success.
- 7 May – Australian cartoon series Blinky Bill begins on Network 2.
- 8 May – The first episode of Family, a drama about domestic violence written by Roddy Doyle, airs on RTÉ One.
- 10 May – The original 1970s Mr. Men animated series returns to Irish television after a long absence, as it goes to air on Network 2 with The Den airing only the first three episodes before its summer break.
- 20 May – The RTÉ People in Need Telethon 1994 is broadcast live from RTÉ One, with Gay Byrne introducing the opening segment.
- 15 July – Australian children's television series Bananas in Pyjamas makes its debut on Network 2.
- 18 July – Glenroe comes to Australia, with SBS broadcasting the series.
- 22 July – The second in the Mr. Men television series trilogy Little Miss begins on Network 2. This event introduces the Mr. Men's female cousins to Irish television for the very first time ever.
- 31 August – The IRA announces a ceasefire, sending the announcement to the RTÉ Newsroom on cassette, and by way of a written message which gives details on the ceasefire.
- 13 September – US sitcom Frasier is launched on Network 2.
- 14 September – The Welsh children's stop-motion series Joshua Jones from Bumper Films (the animation company behind Fireman Sam and Rocky Hollow) is broadcast on Network 2 as part of The Den. Fireman Sam won't return to Irish television until 2000 (although viewers who have access to the BBC and various British television channels were to see earlier transmissions of the series).
- 16 September – A model animated series for children from Australia called Ferry Boat Fred is broadcast on Network 2, airing as the first programme on The Den.
- 17 November – Bertie Ahern is appointed Tánaiste and Minister for Arts, Culture and the Gaeltacht, with responsibility for broadcasting.
- 15 December – Michael D. Higgins is re-appointed Minister for Arts, Culture and the Gaeltacht, with responsibility for broadcasting.

== Debuts ==
=== RTÉ One ===
- 8 January – Red Fox (1991)
- 29 March – 50,000 Secret Journeys (1994)
- 10 April – The Devil and Daniel Mouse (1978)
- 8 May – Family (1994)
- 28 May – The Odyssey (1992–1994)
- 27 June – Love Hurts (1992–1994)
- 9 July – The Busy World of Richard Scarry (1994–1997)
- 30 July – Winnetka Road (1994)
- 30 July – Rupert (1991–1997)
- 6 November – ER (1994–2009)
- 26 December – Enchanted Tales (1990–2000)

=== Network 2 ===
- 3 January – Animaniacs (1993–1998)
- 5 January – The New Adventures of Speed Racer (1993)
- 5 January – Papa Beaver's Storytime (1993–1994)
- 6 January – Marlin Bay (1992–1994)
- 12 January – Dog City (1992–1994)
- 5 February – The Adventures of Brisco County, Jr. (1993–1994)
- 22 March – Tots TV (1993–1998)
- 24 March – Lois & Clark: The New Adventures of Superman (1993–1997)
- 7 April – Megazone (1994–1995)
- 13 April – Scooby, Scrappy and Yabba-Doo (1982)
- 16 April – The World of Peter Rabbit and Friends (1992–1995)
- 27 April – Simon and the Witch (1987–1988)
- 29 April – Doug (1991–1994)
- 7 May – The Adventures of Blinky Bill (1994)
- 9 May – The Adventures of Teddy Ruxpin (1986–1987)
- 12 May – Around the World in Eighty Days (1972–1973)
- 18 June – 2 Stupid Dogs (1993–1995)
- 8 July – The Wild Puffalumps (1988)
- 15 July – Bananas in Pyjamas (1992–2001)
- 22 July – Little Miss (1983)
- 18 August – Broomstick Cottage (1989)
- September – Echo Island (1994–1999)
- 12 September – Adventures of Sonic the Hedgehog (1993)
- 13 September – Frasier (1993–2004)
- 14 September – Joshua Jones (1992)
- 16 September – Moonacre (1994)
- 16 September – Ferry Boat Fred (1992)
- 1 October – The Swamp (1994–1996)
- 3 October – Jeeves and Wooster (1990–1993)
- 5 October – Dinobabies (1994–1995)
- 10 October – Fourways Farm (1993–1996)
- 24 October – Are You Afraid of the Dark? (1990–1996, 1999–2000)
- 12 December – Sonic the Hedgehog (1993–1994)
- 24 December – The Poky Little Puppy's Christmas (1992)
- 24 December – Wild West C.O.W.-Boys of Moo Mesa (1992–1993)
- 25 December – The Bears Who Saved Christmas (1994)
- 25 December – A Flintstone Family Christmas (1993)
- 25 December – Mole's Christmas (1994)
- Undated – The Girl from Tomorrow Part II: Tomorrow's End (1993)

== Changes of network affiliation ==
Shows	Moved from	Moved to
Tots TV	Network 2	RTÉ1
Doug	Network 2	RTÉ1
Papa Beaver's Storytime	Network 2	RTÉ1
The Adventures of Brisco County, Jr.	Network 2	RTÉ1
DuckTales	RTÉ1	Network 2
Simon and the Witch	Network 2	RTÉ1
Tiny Toon Adventures	Network 2	RTÉ1
Count Duckula	Network 2	RTÉ1
The Adventures of Teddy Ruxpin	Network 2	RTÉ1
The Flintstones	RTÉ1	Network 2
Scooby, Scrappy and Yabba-Doo	Network 2	RTÉ1
The Snowman	Network 2	RTÉ1
The Animals of Farthing Wood	Network 2	RTÉ1
The Great Grape Ape Show	RTÉ1	Network 2
The Care Bears Family	Network 2	RTÉ1
Mr. Men	RTÉ1	Network 2
Butterfly Island	Network 2	RTÉ1
The Adventures of Tintin	Network 2	RTÉ1

== Ongoing television programmes ==
=== 1960s ===
- RTÉ News: Nine O'Clock (1961–present)
- RTÉ News: Six One (1962–present)
- The Late Late Show (1962–present)

=== 1970s ===
- Sports Stadium (1973–1997)
- The Late Late Toy Show (1975–present)
- RTÉ News on Two (1978–2014)
- Bosco (1979–1996)
- The Sunday Game (1979–present)

=== 1980s ===
- Mailbag (1982–1996)
- Glenroe (1983–2001)
- Live at 3 (1986–1997)
- Saturday Live (1986–1999)
- Questions and Answers (1986–2009)
- Dempsey's Den (1986–2010)
- Marketplace (1987–1996)
- Where in the World? (1987–1996)
- Know Your Sport (1987–1998)
- Kenny Live (1988–1999)
- Fair City (1989–present)
- RTÉ News: One O'Clock (1989–present)

=== 1990s ===
- Would You Believe (1990s–present)
- Winning Streak (1990–present)
- Blackboard Jungle (1991–1997)
- Challenging Times (1991–2001)
- Prime Time (1992–present)
- The Movie Show (1993–2001)
- No Disco (1993–2003)

== Ending this year ==
- 1 April – Ryantown (1993–1994)
- 3 April – School Around the Corner (1990-1994) moved to UTV instead from 1995.
- 9 April – Play The Game
- 29 May – Family (1994)

== Births ==
- 12 April – Saoirse Ronan, film and television actress

== See also ==
- 1994 in Ireland
