= Make 'Em Laugh (TV series) =

1999 Irish comedy series

- Genre: Comedy
- Written by: Billy McGrath
- Directed by: Peter O'Doherty
- Presented by: Gay Byrne
- Country of origin: Ireland
- Original language: English
- No. of series: 1
- No. of episodes: 8

Production
- Executive producers: John Masterson; Kevin Linehan
- Producer: Billy McGrath
- Production locations: RTÉ Television Centre, Donnybrook, Dublin 4
- Running time: 30 minutes
- Production company: Tyrone Productions

Original release
- Network: RTÉ One
- Release: 6 September – 25 October 1999

Related
- Gaybo Laughs Back

Make 'Em Laugh is an Irish comedy studio series hosted by Gay Byrne who had just retired from presenting The Late Late Show – which after The Tonight Show Starring Johnny Carson in the USA ended, became the longest-running live studio chat show on broadcast TV. The clip show aired for one series in 1999 and featured Byrne taking a look at classic comedy moments from the RTÉ Archives. The idea was initially developed by EP John Masterson who brought in established comedy producer and writer Billy (Magra) McGrath to drive the content. Magra and McGrath had performed on The Late Late Show in 1981 as Ireland's first alternative comedian but the tape recording of the show was wiped. The title and the title music were derived from the song performed by Donald O'Connor in the classic Hollywood movie Singin' in the Rain. In the year's Top 20 most-watched Programmes of the Year poll, Make 'Em Laugh was at number 7, which amplified both the popularity of the series and also Byrne's legendary box office appeal. This series spawned a plethora of similar TV ideas trawling the RTE Archives (e.g. Gaybo Laughs Back) with the latest still airing in 2019 hosted by Pat Shortt. Later, McGrath went on to become RTE's first-ever Commissioning Editor of Entertainment (2000–2002) before emerging as one of Ireland's most successful format creators and, with his company Sideline Productions, Ireland's biggest radio comedy producer.
