= Ballymagash =

- Genre: Comedy, satire
- Presented by: Frank Hall
- Starring: Frank Kelly; Pat Daly; Paul Murphy; Paddy Dawson
- Country of origin: Ireland
- Original language: English
- No. of series: 1
- No. of episodes: 13

Production
- Producers: John Keogh; Peter McEvoy
- Production locations: Studio 2, RTÉ Television Centre, Donnybrook, Dublin 4
- Camera setup: Multi-camera
- Running time: 30 minutes

Original release
- Network: RTÉ One
- Release: 10 January – 28 March 1983

Related
- Hall's Pictorial Weekly

Ballymagash is a satirical Irish television programme that aired on RTÉ One for one series in 1983. Presented by Frank Hall and featuring many of the cast members from the earlier Hall's Pictorial Weekly, the show was set in the fictional town of Ballymagash and cast a satirical eye on some of the "local" stories and personalities.
