= Runaway Bay (TV series) =

Children's television series

- French: La Baie des fugitifs
- German: Abenteuer in der Karibik
- Bulgarian: Заливът беглец
- Genre: Adventure
- Created by: Dickie Jobson
- Based on: Runaway Bay by Dickie Jobson
- Written by: Dickie Jobson; Aaron Barzman; Elizabeth Baxter; Martin Brossollet; Jeremy Burnham; John Chambers; Sylvie Dervin; Michael Russell; Ben Steed; Lucy Wagner; Fabrice Ziolkowski
- Directed by: Tim Dowd; Xavier Castano; Laurence Moody
- Starring: Carl Bradshaw; Eric Fried; Diana Eskell
- Opening theme: "Romantic World" by Dana Dawson
- Composer: Romano Musumarra
- Countries of origin: United Kingdom; United States; France
- Original language: English
- No. of seasons: 3
- No. of episodes: 26

Production
- Executive producers: Chris Jelley; Robert Page; Robert Réa
- Producers: Eddie Babbage; Anne W. Gibbons; Frédérique Gore
- Production locations: Martinique, Caribbean

Original release
- Network: Yorkshire Television; Antenne 2 CBS Television; Kindernet
- Release: 1992 – 1993

Runaway Bay is a children's adventure television series which originally aired from 1992 to 1993. The series followed a group of friends having adventures while living on the island of Martinique in the Caribbean. The show was principally produced by Lifetime Productions International Ltd with Ellipse Productions for the television networks Antenne 2, CBS Television, and Yorkshire Television. In the UK, the show was screened on ITV. In the Netherlands, the series was shown on Kindernet from 1993 to 1999.

The show's theme is sung by Dana Dawson and is a lyrical reworking of her 1990 single "Romantic World", which was a hit in France.

== Episodes ==
=== Season 1 ===
1. Into the Night (9 January 1992)
2. Rotten Fish (16 January 1992)
3. Lonely Is the Brave (23 January 1992)
4. Taking the Rap (30 January 1992)
5. Fool's Gold (6 February 1992)
6. You Only Live Twice (13 February 1992)
7. Treasure Hunt (20 February 1992)
8. Curse of the Monkey's Skull (27 February 1992)
9. All That Glitters (5 March 1992)
10. Fast Forward (12 March 1992)
11. The Venture (19 March 1992)
12. History Revisited (26 March 1992)

=== Season 2 ===
1. All in the Mine (2 April 1992)
2. Going for Gold (15 February 1993)
3. Race Like the Wind (22 February 1993)
4. Sink or Swim (1 March 1993)
5. The Escape (8 March 1993)
6. Heartbreak Hotel (15 March 1993)
7. The Secret Garden (22 March 1993)
8. The Robbery (29 March 1993)
9. Turtles Rule (5 April 1993)

=== Season 3 ===
1. Music to My Ears (19 April 1993)
2. Bombs Away (26 April 1993)
3. Deadline (10 May 1993)
4. Masquerade (17 May 1993)
5. Radio Daze (24 May 1993)
