= The Brendan Grace Show =

- Genre: Light entertainment
- Presented by: Brendan Grace
- Starring: Daddy Cool and the Lollipops; Gypsy
- Country of origin: Ireland
- Original language: English
- No. of series: 1
- No. of episodes: 6

Production
- Production locations: Studio 1, RTÉ Television Centre, Donnybrook, Dublin 4
- Camera setup: Multi-camera
- Running time: 50 minutes

Original release
- Network: RTÉ One
- Release: 29 October – 10 December 1982

The Brendan Grace Show is an Irish variety show presented by Brendan Grace. The studio-based show aired on Friday nights between 29 October and 10 December 1982.

== Format ==
The Brendan Grace Show featured comedy routines and sketches by Brendan Grace as well as special celebrity guests. The music was provided by special musical guests as well as the show's house band, Daddy Cool and the Lollipops. The dance group Gypsy made regular appearances throughout the series.

== Programming ==
=== Series 1: 1982 ===
Show	Date	Special guests
1.	29 October	Joe Lynch and Anna McGoldrick.
2.	5 November	Joe Lynch and Anna McGoldrick.
3.	12 November	Seán Dowd and Rose Tynan.
4.	19 November	Helen Jordan and Glen Curtin.
5.	3 December	Mr. Pussy, Eileen Reid, Susan McCann, Charlie Byrne, Rose Tynan and Paul Malone.
6.	10 December	Sheeba, Kim Newport, Tony Kenny.

== Production ==
The Brendan Grace Show was broadcast live from Studio 1 in the RTÉ Television Centre at Donnybrook, Dublin 4. As RTÉ's biggest at the time, the studio held 120 audience members. There was no show broadcast on 26 November 1982 due to the general election.
