= Time Now Mr T =

- Genre: Comedy
- Written by: Niall Tóibín
- Starring: Niall Tóibín
- Country of origin: Ireland
- Original language: English
- No. of series: 1
- No. of episodes: 8

Production
- Production locations: Studio 1, RTÉ Television Centre, Donnybrook, Dublin 4, Ireland
- Camera setup: Multi-camera
- Running time: 30 minutes

Original release
- Network: RTÉ
- Release: 20 January – 17 March 1977

Time Now Mr T is an Irish television sketch show that aired on RTÉ for one series in 1977. The show was written by and starred Niall Tóibín.
