= Pillow People =

Line of stuffed toys

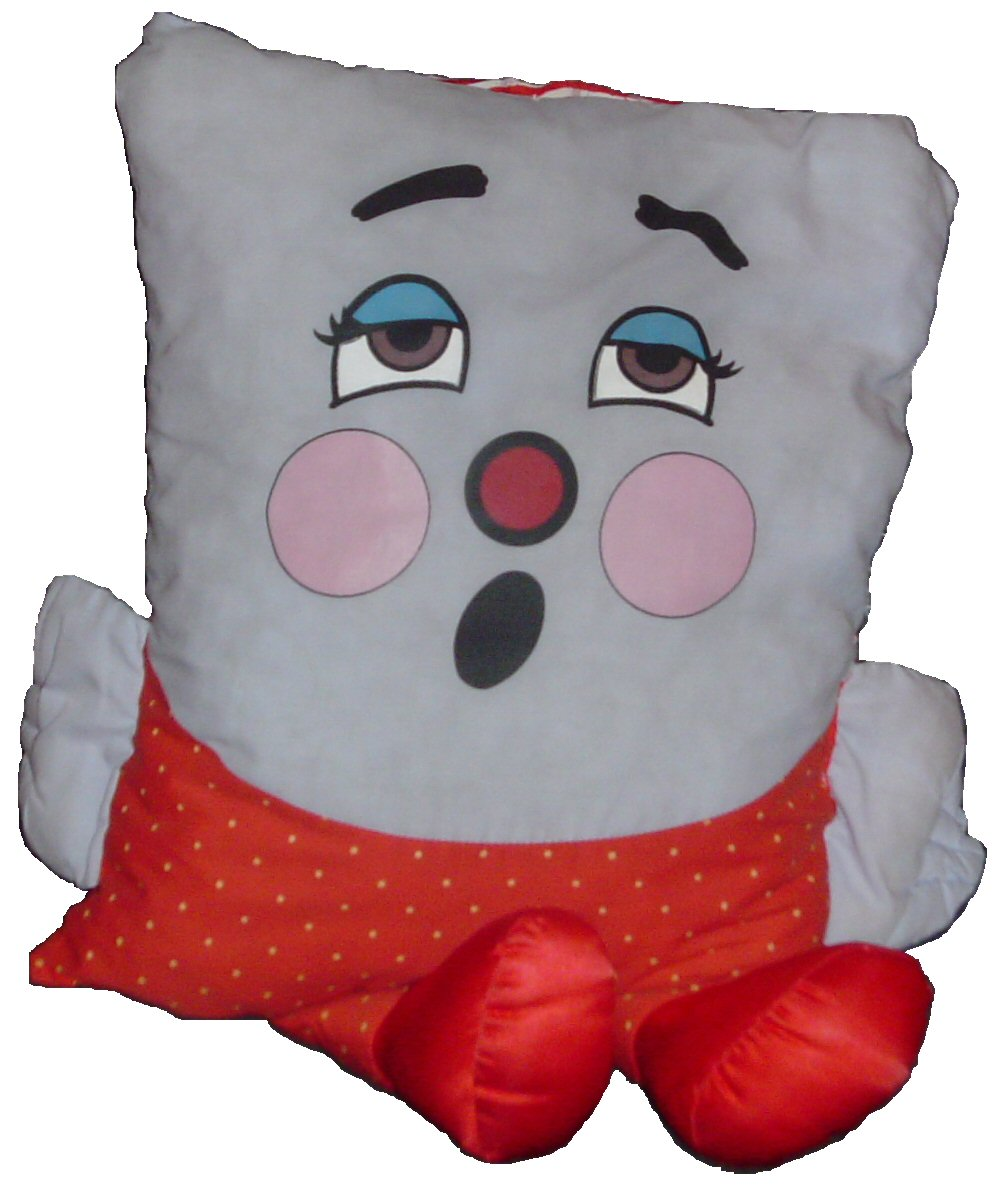
- Mr. Sandman character
- Type: Stuffed toys
- Invented by: Penny Ekstein-Lieberman
- Company: Springs Industries, PSE Marketing
- Country: United States
- Availability: 1986–?

Pillow People are rectangular stuffed toys (pillows) with decal faces and stuffed hands and feet attached to their bodies. The line was started in 1986 by Penny Ekstein-Lieberman and was produced by Springs Industries (and later PSE Marketing). The toys were popular during the late 1980s and generated $120 million in sales. The line featured an array of different characters such as animals and people. Besides the 'people' of the line, they also manufacture pillow pets—such as cats and dogs. Additional merchandise included bed sheets imprinted with Pillow People characters, figurines and books. A Christmas TV special was also produced.

== Characters ==
Some of the original Pillow People characters included:

- Mr. Sandman
- Pillow Fighter
- Punky Pillow
- Mr. Thunderclap
- Sweet Dreams
- Rock-a-bye Baby
- Big Footsteps
- Squeaky Door
- Window Rattler
- Cry Baby Giggles
- Hearts Throb
