= A Game of Two Halves =

- Genre: Sport
- Presented by: Trevor Welch
- Starring: Declan Lynch; Liam Mackey
- Country of origin: Ireland
- Original language: English
- No. of seasons: 1
- No. of episodes: 13

Production
- Camera setup: Multi-camera
- Running time: 30 minutes

Original release
- Network: TV3
- Release: 12 April – 5 July 1999

A Game of Two Halves is an Irish panel show with a sporting theme hosted by Trevor Welch which was broadcast on TV3 for one series in 1999. The team leaders were Declan Lynch and Liam Mackey, who writes for the Irish Examiner.
