= 1968 in Irish television =

The following is a list of events relating to television in Ireland from 1968.

== Events ==
- January – RTÉ's Director-General Kevin McCourt makes the decision to recall the Seven Days crew as they are en route to report on the Biafran War.
- 12 February – Director-General McCourt announces the transfer of responsibility for Seven Days to the RTÉ News Division, a decision which leads to industrial unrest and the suspension of several members of the production team for "blacking" the programme on air. The dispute is finally resolved in March.
- 16 March – Thomas P. Hardiman replaces Kevin McCourt as Director-General of RTÉ, and is the first Director-General to be appointed internally within the organisation.
- 5 October – RTÉ cameraman Gay O'Brien and soundman Eamon Hayes film a civil rights march in Derry, Northern Ireland during which RUC officers baton charge the crowd and use a water cannon.

== Ongoing television programmes ==
- RTÉ News: Nine O'Clock (1961–present)
- Dáithí Lacha (1962–1969)
- RTÉ News: Six One (1962–present)
- The Late Late Show (1962–present)
- Newsbeat (1964–1971)
- The Riordans (1965–1979)
- Quicksilver (1965–1981)
- Seven Days (1966–1976)
- Wanderly Wagon (1967–1982)

== Ending this year ==
- 1 January – Me and My Friend (1967–1968)
- 31 May – Tolka Row (1964–1968)

== Births ==
- Undated – Alan Cantwell, newsreader

== See also ==
- 1968 in Ireland
