= Leave It to Mrs O'Brien =

1984 Irish television series

- Genre: Situation comedy
- Created by: Angela McFadden
- Written by: Joe Dunlop
- Directed by: Brian Mac Lochlainn
- Starring: Anna Manahan; Pat Daly; Philip O'Sullivan; Blanaid Irvine; Brendan Caldwell
- Country of origin: Ireland
- Original language: English
- No. of series: 2
- No. of episodes: 23

Production
- Production locations: Studio 1, RTÉ Television Centre, Donnybrook, Dublin 4, Ireland
- Camera setup: Multi-camera
- Running time: 30 minutes

Original release
- Network: RTÉ Two
- Release: 7 November 1984 – 23 April 1986

Leave It to Mrs O'Brien is an Irish television sitcom that aired on RTÉ 2 for two series from 1984 to 1986. Starring Anna Manahan in the title role, it was based on the stories of Angela McFadden.

== Plot ==
Set in a local parochial house in the Liberties area of inner-city Dublin, the show's main character, Mrs O'Brien, is the housekeeper to two Roman Catholic priests. Her main adversary is Sister Gertrude, an archetypal authoritarian dragon, and in the middle are the two priests of the house. The veteran parish priest, Fr. Rooney, is also prone to skullduggery and is in fear of being moved to a new parish by the Bishop. The second priest, Fr. Michael, is a young, trendy and "sensible" curate.

== Cast ==
- Anna Manahan as Mrs O'Brien
- Pat Daly as Fr. Rooney
- Philip O'Sullivan as Fr. "Michael" Lynch
- Blanaid Irvine as Sister Gertrude
- Brendan Caldwell as Pat Dunn
- Chris Curran as Mr Burke
- May Cluskey as Mrs Burke
- Martina Stanley as Maureen
- David Heep as Patrick

== Production ==
=== Recording ===
The interior scenes for both series were shot in Studio 1 at the RTÉ Television Centre. While the first series was filmed without a laughter track, the second series was filmed in front of a live studio audience. The quantity of laughter generated was about the same. The second series also saw more on-location filming as well as guest appearances.

== Reception ==
Both series consistently topped the channel's ratings with an audience of over 250,000 per episode; however, it had a less favourable response from the critics. According to the Irish Independent, "One TV critic wanted those responsible 'thrown on the dole and given lousy references'". The network's defense that the series was meant to appeal to undiscriminating viewers, particularly children and the elderly, only invited further criticism.
