= 1972 in Irish television =

The following is a list of events relating to television in Ireland from 1972.

== Events ==
- 23 June – After RTÉ Television airs more film of IRA members, the Irish government meets with the RTÉ Authority to express its displeasure.
- 24 November – The government dismisses the RTÉ Authority and a new authority is appointed.

== Ongoing television programmes ==
- RTÉ News: Nine O'Clock (1961–present)
- RTÉ News: Six One (1962–present)
- The Late Late Show (1962–present)
- The Riordans (1965–1979)
- Quicksilver (1965–1981)
- Seven Days (1966–1976)
- Wanderly Wagon (1967–1982)
- Hall's Pictorial Weekly (1971–1980)

== Births ==
- 4 February – Dara Ó Briain, stand-up comedian and television presenter
- 21 March – Rachel Allen, celebrity chef, television personality and writer

== See also ==
- 1972 in Ireland
