= 1971 in Irish television =

The following is a list of events relating to television in Ireland from 1971.

== Events ==
- 17 March – RTÉ broadcasts the first domestic television footage in colour – coverage of the Railway Cup Finals from Croke Park in Dublin.
- 31 March – Cigarette advertising on television in the Irish Republic ceases.
- 3 April – Ireland hosts the Eurovision Song Contest for the first time. It is presented by Bernadette Ní Ghallchóir from Dublin's Gaiety Theatre, and won by Monaco, with the song "Un banc, un arbre, une rue" (A bench, a tree, a street), sung by Séverine. Again the programme is aired in colour. The Irish entry, "One Day Love", sung by Angela Farrell, finishes eleventh, which is that country's worst ever result until the following year.
- June – Taoiseach Jack Lynch states that it is unsuitable for a publicly funded broadcaster to give airtime to representatives of illegal organizations. In response RTÉ argues that such a change would require the implementation of Section 31 of the Broadcasting Act.
- June – The Broadcasting Review Commission is established.
- 11 June – Newsbeat airs for the last time.
- 28 September – An edition of the current affairs programme Seven Days features interviews with both branches of the IRA – the Official IRA and Provisional IRA.
- 29 September – The comedy series Hall's Pictorial Weekly Incorporating the Provincial Vindicator, presented by Frank Hall is aired for the first time.
- 1 October – Taoiseach Lynch issues the first directive based on Section 31 of the Broadcasting Act, From now on RTÉ is "to refrain from broadcasting any matter of the following class, i.e., any matter that could be calculated to promote the aims or activities of any organization which engages in, promotes, encourages or advocates the attaining of any particular objective by violent means". On the same day, Minister for Posts and Telegraphs Gerry Collins bans the broadcasting of material that could promote such organisations. The directive is renewed every year, and was not repealed until 1994.
- Undated – The Eurovision News Exchange enables RTÉ to link with other European and U.S. broadcasting networks.
- Undated – Establishment of RTÉ Relays to provide commercial service for wired television.
- Undated – The Late Late Show interviews politicians for the first time.
- Undated – U.S. children's educational series Sesame Street begins its very first Irish television premiere on RTÉ.

== Debuts ==
- 29 September – Hall's Pictorial Weekly (1971–1980)
- Undated – (United States) Sesame Street (1969–present)

== Ongoing television programmes ==
- RTÉ News: Nine O'Clock (1961–present)
- RTÉ News: Six One (1962–present)
- The Late Late Show (1962–present)
- The Riordans (1965–1979)
- Quicksilver (1965–1981)
- Seven Days (1966–1976)
- Wanderly Wagon (1967–1982)

== Ending this year ==
- 11 June – Newsbeat (1964–1971)

== Births ==
- 31 January – Patrick Kielty, comedian and television personality
- 25 July – Pamela Flood, model and television presenter
- 24 October – Dervla Kirwan, actress

== See also ==
- 1970 in Ireland
