= 1962 in Irish television =

The following is a list of events relating to television in Ireland from 1962.

== Events ==
- 1 January
  - One of the longest running programmes in Irish news and current affairs history, RTÉ News: Six One, began broadcasting, with Charles Mitchel reading the news. He continued to host the programme until his retirement in 1984.
  - First broadcast of the weekday topical news magazine programme Broadsheet on Telefís Éireann.
- 12 January – First broadcast of the long-running religious and social documentary series Radharc.
- 20 February – The BBC relayed commentary of the Friendship 7 spaceflight when John Glenn became the first American to orbit the Earth.
- 17 March – US animated series The Flintstones (television's first animated prime time sitcom) began broadcasting on Telefís Éireann.
- April – Telefís Éireann staff moved to newly-built studios in Donnybrook, Dublin. Previously, they were in temporary accommodation in the city centre.
- May – Telefís Éireann showed the first party political broadcast following that year's Budget.
- 6 July – The Late Late Show, one of the longest-running talk shows in the world, aired for the first time.
- Autumn – Edward J. Roth resigned as Director-General of RTÉ. He was succeeded in December by Kevin C. McCourt.
- October – Irish broadcaster Gay Byrne became the first person to introduce The Beatles on television as the band made their small screen debut on local news programme People and Places in Manchester, England.
- December – The first Irish Television Awards were presented. The event was originally called the Jacob's Awards after its sponsor, Jacob's Ltd., until the late 1970s.

== Debuts ==
- 1 January – Broadsheet (1962–1963)
- 1 January – RTÉ News: Six One (1962–present)
- 2 January – School Around the Corner (1962–1986)
- 6 January – Jackpot (1962–1965)
- 17 March – (United States) The Flintstones (1960–1966)
- 6 July – The Late Late Show (1962–present)
- 31 December – Dáithí Lacha (1962–1969)
- Undated – Radharc (1962–1996)

== Ongoing television programmes ==
- RTÉ News: Nine O'Clock (1961–present)

== Births ==
- Undated – Enda Oates, film, stage and television actor
- Undated – Úna O'Hagan, journalist and newsreader

== See also ==
- 1962 in Ireland
