= 1970 in Irish television =

The following is a list of events relating to television in Ireland from 1970.

== Events ==
- 21 March – Ireland wins the Eurovision Song Contest, held in Amsterdam, for the first time with "All Kinds of Everything", sung by Dana.
- May – Finnish Television airs a four-hour broadcast of RTÉ programmes titled Ireland Tonight. The broadcast includes King of the Road, a film of the life of a Tipperary roadworker, the children's series Wanderly Wagon, Guests of the Nation, a dramatisation of Frank O'Connor's short story; Ballad Sheet, July the Mad Month, a film on the political and religious situation in Northern Ireland, and Sports Magazine.
- 6 May – RTÉ broadcasts seven hours of news coverage on the dismissal of cabinet members by the Taoiseach.
- 9 May – Gerry Collins is appointed Minister for Posts and Telegraphs.
- Undated – As the situation in Northern Ireland intensifies, RTÉ's coverage of events increases, with frequent extended news bulletins and additional news programming.
- Undated – The limit on the number of households connected to high-specification television aerial is raised to 500.

== Debuts ==
- 29 September – (United States) H.R. Pufnstuf (1969)

== Ongoing television programmes ==
- RTÉ News: Nine O'Clock (1961–present)
- RTÉ News: Six One (1962–present)
- The Late Late Show (1962–present)
- Newsbeat (1964–1971)
- The Riordans (1965–1979)
- Quicksilver (1965–1981)
- Seven Days (1966–1976)
- Wanderly Wagon (1967–1982)

== Births ==
- 8 July – Maura Derrane, journalist and television presenter
- 17 December – Craig Doyle, radio and television presenter
- Undated – Alan Devine, actor

== See also ==
- 1970 in Ireland
