= 1987 in Irish television =

The following is a list of events relating to television in Ireland from 1987.

== Events ==
- 10 March – John Wilson is appointed Minister for Communications with responsibility for broadcasting.
- 31 March – Ray Burke is appointed Minister for Communications with responsibility for broadcasting.
- 9 May – Ireland wins the Eurovision Song Contest with "Hold Me Now", a song composed and performed by Johnny Logan.
- 22 June – RTÉ Television introduces its Aertel teletext service.
- 6 July – NBC's popular television sitcom ALF is officially launched on RTÉ's RTÉ 1.
- 22 September – Zig and Zag, two extraterrestrials from the planet Zog, make their very first appearance on Dempsey's Den. They would host the programme until 1993, when they would move on to make appearances on British television.
- 2-5 October – Airdate of pirate television station Telefis na Gaeltacht based in Connemara (not to be confused with its similarly named legal successor). Eighteen hours of pre-recorded programmes were carried in this period. Several Irish deflector systems (normally used for relaying British television signals on UHF) occasionally carried local programming.
- 5 November – Irish television and radio presenter Eamonn Andrews, well known for presenting programmes such as World of Sport, What's My Line? and This Is Your Life, dies in London following heart failure; he will be buried in Dublin.

== Debuts ==
=== RTÉ 1 ===
- 3 March – (United Kingdom) The Return of the Antelope (1986–1988)
- 9 April – (Canada) Danger Bay (1984–1990)
- 2 May – (Australia) Saturdee (1986)
- 9 May – (United States) The 13 Ghosts of Scooby-Doo (1985)
- 8 June – (Canada) The Littlest Hobo (1979–1985)
- 6 July – (United States) ALF (1986–1990)
- 7 July – (United States) / (Australia) The Berenstain Bears (1985–1987)
- 9 July – (United States) Yogi's Treasure Hunt (1985–1986)
- 10 July – (United States) The Wuzzles (1985)
- 11 July – (United States) Shadow Chasers (1985–1986)
- 1 August – (United States) Galtar and the Golden Lance (1985–1986)
- 15 August – (United Kingdom) Henry's Leg (1986)
- 23 September – (United States) The Real Ghostbusters (1986–1991)
- 30 September – (United States) The Flintstone Kids (1986–1988)
- 4 October – Where in the World? (1987–2006)
- 5 October – (United Kingdom) Executive Stress (1986–1988)
- 6 October – (United Kingdom) Codename Icarus (1981)
- 8 October – Know Your Sport (1987–1998)
- 24 December – (United States) He-Man & She-Ra: A Christmas Special (1985)
- Undated - (United States) Our House (1986-1988)

=== RTÉ 2 ===
- 3 October – Marketplace (1987–1996)
- 9 November – (Canada) The Kids of Degrassi Street (1979–1986)

== Changes of network affiliation ==
Shows	Moved from	Moved to
(United States) Alvin and the Chipmunks (Ruby Spears version)	RTÉ 1	RTÉ 2
(United Kingdom) Cockleshell Bay	RTÉ 2	RTÉ 1

== Ongoing television programmes ==
=== 1960s ===
- RTÉ News: Nine O'Clock (1961–present)
- RTÉ News: Six One (1962–present)
- The Late Late Show (1962–present)

=== 1970s ===
- Sports Stadium (1973–1997)
- The Late Late Toy Show (1975–present)
- RTÉ News on Two (1978–2014)
- Bosco (1979–1996)
- The Sunday Game (1979–present)

=== 1980s ===
- Today Tonight (1982–1992)
- Mailbag (1982–1996)
- Glenroe (1983–2001)
- Rapid Roulette (1986–1990)
- Live at 3 (1986–1997)
- Saturday Live (1986–1999)
- Questions and Answers (1986–2009)
- Dempsey's Den (1986–2010)

== Ending this year ==
- Undated – MT-USA (1984–1987)

== Births ==
- 9 January – Nicola Coughlan, actress
- 24 January – Ruth Bradley, actress

== Deaths ==
- 5 November – Eamonn Andrews, 64, broadcaster and television presenter

== See also ==
- 1987 in Ireland
