= The Movie Show (Irish TV series) =

1993–2001 Irish TV series

- Genre: Movie review
- Presented by: Dave Fanning
- Theme music composer: Floyd Cramer
- Opening theme: "Last Date"
- Country of origin: Ireland
- Original language: English
- No. of episodes: Almost 400

Production
- Production locations: RTÉ Television Centre, Donnybrook, Dublin 4, Ireland
- Running time: 25-30 minutes

Original release
- Network: Network 2 RTÉ 1
- Release: 7 October 1993 – September 2001

Related
- What?!Movie

The Movie Show was a half-hour weekly film review programme that was broadcast by RTÉ in the Republic of Ireland. It was presented by Dave Fanning, and aired from 1993 to September 2001.

When the programme was cancelled, Fanning criticised RTÉ's management, saying he was not consulted, and calling the cancellation "ludicrous" and "outrageous". Fanning said that it had been "a very cheap programme and we were always under budget".

The Movie Show was the working title of a new film review series for the 2012–13 season on RTÉ. The series ran for 16 episodes, each of 25 minutes duration.

== 2012 return ==
On Thursday 1 November 2012, the show, produced by Animo productions, returned to RTÉ Two at 9.00pm for 30 minutes and ran for 16 weeks. It was presented by Mairead Farrell and Eoghan McDermott with reporters Angela Scanlon, Rob Ross and Daniella Moyles. The first episode had interviews with Daniel Craig and Ross Noble and a review of Fun Size.
