= RTÉ Aertel =

Irish teletext service

- First air date: 22 June 1987
- Area: Ireland
- Owner: RTÉ
- Dissolved: 12 October 2023
- Former names: Aertel (1987–2003)
- Official website: Official website

RTÉ Aertel was a teletext service broadcast on RTÉ One and RTÉ2 in Ireland from 1987 until 2023. It was also available in its entirety on the Internet until 2019.

== History ==
The teletext service began development in the mid-1980s, with tests as early as 1985, including a six-week on-air experimental version being broadcast in early 1986. The service was formally launched on 22 June 1987 with pages being updated between 10am and 10pm. Originally called simply Aertel, it gained the RTÉ prefix along with RTÉ's other activities from September 2003. The RTÉ.ie news service used to simply wrap Aertel's output into their web pages, with the service also available on WAP.

A selection of RTÉ Aertel pages were broadcast in-vision during daytime downtime and when morning programmes began, pages were shown overnight on rotation on RTÉ Two after normal programming, under the title Nightscreen.

From the terrestrial analogue switch-off in 2012 and Virgin Media analogue switch-off in 2019 up until its closure in 2023, the Aertel teletext service was only available on satellite.

In April 2018, it was reported that RTÉ asked the Minister for Communications, Climate Action and Environment for permission to reduce the Aertel service on the grounds that it had been superseded by more recent technology. For legal reasons, RTE has to get permission from the Minister to make significant changes to Aertel.

Since September 2019 the RTÉ Aertel internet homepage now merely acts as a series of links or site map of the wider RTÉ website.

== Closure of the service ==
In November 2019, it was announced that Aertel will be shut down as part of cost-cutting measures at RTÉ. On 2 October 2023 it was announced by RTÉ that the service would be shut down on 12 October 2023. Prior to the complete closure of the service, late morning and into the afternoon of the 12th, most pages/magazines were removed from the service, with only around 13 pages remaining (plus subtitles on page 888) on Aertel 1 and 14 pages on Aertel 2. Page 700 - which previously detailed the reasons for the closure of the service - was removed although some parts of it appeared to be mixed in with page 100, which was exhibiting significant coding errors on both Aertel 1 and 2, whilst also scrolling through the error laden page 100 magazine every 2 seconds. By 1:15pm, all other remaining pages (apart from subtitles on 888) had disappeared with only an error laden rapidly scrolling page 100 appearing. At 13:22, Aertel 1 disappeared completely whilst being replaced by a steady Aertel 2 page 100 on both channels. By 13:45 page 100 disappeared on both channels with only the teletext clock left running, finally signalling the complete closure of the Aertel service itself after more than 36 years of broadcasting.

== List of pages ==
=== RTÉ One and RTÉ2 ===
- 103 News
- 130 Business
- 140 Share Prices
- 150 National Lottery
- 160 Weather
- 170 RTÉ Guide
- 200 RTÉ Sport
- 300 Entertainment
- 590 RTÉ Information Index
- 740 HSE COVID-19 Information
- 888 Subtitles

=== RTÉ One ===
- 650 Saorview (Broken Page)

=== RTÉ2 ===
- 650 Superquinn (Broken Page)
- 594 Using Aertel
- 599 Aertel Mobile

== RTÉ Aertel Digital ==
RTÉ Aertel Digital is currently [when?] broadcast on the Saorview service on all RTÉ channels. The service is the same on each channel. RTÉ have proposed providing more improvements with the service over the coming years. It was also proposed that the text service would be carried on their radio services which broadcast on Saorview.
