= Blackboard Jungle (game show) =

Irish quiz show

- Presented by: Ray D'Arcy
- Country of origin: Ireland
- Original language: English
- No. of series: 7
- No. of episodes: 611

Production
- Production locations: Studio 2, RTÉ Television Centre, Donnybrook, Dublin 4
- Running time: 25-30 minutes
- Production company: Frontier Films

Original release
- Network: Network 2
- Release: 18 September 1991 – 31 July 1997

Blackboard Jungle is an Irish quiz show hosted by Ray D'Arcy that aired for seven series on Network 2 between 1991 and 1998. The show, which aired up to three times a week, featured two teams of three representing two competing secondary schools. A grand final was held at the end of each series.

== Winners ==
- 1991-92: St. Mary's Secondary School, Edenderry, Co. Offaly
- 1992-93: Ardscoil Rís, Limerick
- 1993-94:
- 1994-95: St. Peter's College, Wexford
- 1995-96:
- 1996-97: St. Patrick's Grammar School, Armagh
- 1997-98: Belvedere College, Dublin
