= All Change =

- Starring: Pam Ferris
- Country of origin: United Kingdom
- Original language: English
- No. of series: 2
- No. of episodes: 12

Production
- Running time: 22 minutes

Original release
- Network: CITV
- Release: 15 November 1989 – 5 February 1991

All Change is an English children's television show on ITV in two series. Originally broadcast between 15 November 1989 and 5 February 1991, it starred Frankie Howerd, Peggy Mount, Maggie Steed, Tony Haygarth and Pam Ferris. The series was devised by Morwenna Banks and Chris England.

== Plot ==
The storyline concerned the deceased Uncle Bob's families and who would inherit his fortune. One branch was poor and common, the other branch was rich and snobbish. Each family had two parents, a son and a daughter. The families swapped lives (although one child stayed in their own home with the newcomers) in order to see who could cope best with their new circumstances and the victors would inherit Uncle Bob's money. At the end of the first series, it was all revealed as a hoax and no-one was any better off. The second series concerned the two families working together in a factory which produced pottery gnomes.

== Regular cast ==
- Frankie Howerd (Uncle Bob)
- Pam Ferris (Maggie Oldfield)
- Maggie Steed (Fabia London)
- David Quilter (Charles London)
- Tony Haygarth (Brian Oldfield (first series))
- Bobby Knutt (Brian Oldfield (second series))
- Lisa Butler (Polly London)
- Donna Durkin (Vicky Oldfield)
- William McGillivray (Julian London)
- Robert Ellis (Nathan Oldfield)
- Roger Milner (Henry Herewith)
- Peggy Mount (Aunt Fanny (second series))
- Andrew Normington (Hornbeam (second series))
