= 1990 in Irish television =

The following is a list of events relating to television in Ireland from 1990.

== Events ==
- 4 June – Ian Dempsey presents his final day of the afternoon children's television block Dempsey's Den. He will be taken over by Ray D'Arcy and the name will be changed to The Den.
- 24 July – The Broadcasting Act comes into law. The Act includes amendments to earlier legislation covering advertising and commercial promotion.
- 2 October – The long-running British sitcom Only Fools and Horses is broadcast in Ireland for the first time, making its debut on Network 2.
- 11 October – The American-French-Canadian animated cult series from the 1980s Inspector Gadget has its broadcasting on Network 2 as part of The Den for the very first time.
- 13 November – Robert D. Cardona and David Mitton's short lived children's television series Tugs debuts on Network 2 as the first programme on The Den. The first episode will air on a Tuesday and the other episodes will air every Monday starting from 19 November. Thomas the Tank Engine & Friends will not appear on Irish television until six years later.
- 19 November – American television sitcom Sidekicks is broadcast in Ireland for the first time, making its debut on Network 2 as part of their children's programming strand The Den.
- Bosco: The Animated Series airs on Channel 5 in Singapore for the very first time as part of its children's block Kids' Corner. This was also the very first time that the Bosco franchise was broadcast abroad.

== Debuts ==
=== RTÉ 1 ===
- 1 January – Around the World in 80 Days (1989)
- 27 July – Yellowthread Street (1990)
- 21 September – Winning Streak (1990–present)
- 22 September – Secrets (1990–1993)
- 23 September – // The New Adventures of Black Beauty (1990–1992)
- 7 October – School Around the Corner (1990–1994)
- 14 October - Twin Peaks (1990–1991, 2017)
- 17 November – Round the Bend (1989–1991)
- 30 December – The Silver Chair (1990)
- Undated – Dear Sarah (1990)

=== Network 2 ===
- 4 January – Pals (1987)
- 9 January – Gophers! (1990)
- 22 January – / The World of David the Gnome (1985)
- 7 February – / Worzel Gummidge Down Under (1987–1989)
- 11 February – Zorro (1990–1993)
- 8 March – All Change (1989–1991)
- 9 March – / Dogtanian and the Three Muskehounds (1981–1982)
- 13 March – A Pup Named Scooby-Doo (1988–1991)
- 19 March – Rarg (1988)
- 29 March – The Second Voyage of the Mimi (1988)
- 2 April – Bright Sparks (1989)
- 17 April – Mike and Angelo (1989–2000)
- 18 April – The Adventures of Raggedy Ann and Andy (1988–1990)
- 18 April – Alvin and the Chipmunks (Murakami Wolf Swenson/DiC version) (1988–1989)
- 27 April – Mr Majeika (1988–1990)
- 10 May – Touché Turtle (1962–1963)
- 12 July – Byker Grove (1989–2006)
- 12 July – The Ozlets (1986)
- 13 July – Storybook World (1988)
- 18 July – Popeye and Son (1987)
- 21 July – The New Yogi Bear Show (1988)
- 6 August – Check It Out! (1985–1988)
- 8 August – Hills End (1988)
- 9 August – Woof! (1989–1997)
- 3 September – Wisdom of the Gnomes (1987–1988)
- 4 September – Tottie: The Story of a Doll's House (1984–1986)
- 6 September – Hokey Wolf (1960–1961)
- 6 September – Superman (1988)
- 7 September – Teenage Mutant Hero Turtles (1987–1996)
- 11 September – The Fruitties (1987–1989)
- 20 September – // The Care Bears (1985)
- 2 October – Capital News (1990)
- 2 October – Only Fools and Horses (1981–1983, 1985–1993, 1996, 2001–2003, 2014)
- 8 October – Grimm's Fairy Tales (1984–1986)
- 11 October – // Inspector Gadget (1983–1986)
- 31 October – Ferris Bueller (1990)
- 8 November – The Castle of Adventure (1990)
- 13 November – Tugs (1989)
- 19 November – Sidekicks (1986–1987)
- 5 December – Edward and Friends (1987)
- 13 December – Captain Planet and the Planeteers (1990–1996)
- 16 December – The Chiffy Kids (1976–1980)
- 24 December – Bluetoes the Christmas Elf (1988)
- 25 December – Granpa (1989)
- Undated – Saved by the Bell (1989–1993)
- Undated - A Peaceable Kingdom (1989)

== Changes of network affiliation ==
Shows	Moved from	Moved to
Mike and Angelo	Network 2	RTÉ1
Swiss Family Robinson	Network 2	RTÉ1
/ Snorks	Network 2	RTÉ1
Codename Icarus	RTÉ1	Network 2
A Pup Named Scooby-Doo	Network 2	RTÉ1
The Adventures of Raggedy Ann and Andy	Network 2	RTÉ1
Bright Sparks	Network 2	RTÉ1
The Jetsons	RTÉ1	Network 2
Alvin and the Chipmunks (Murakami Wolf Swenson/DiC version)	Network 2	RTÉ1
/ The World of David the Gnome	Network 2	RTÉ1
The Flintstones	Network 2	RTÉ1
The All-New Popeye Show	RTÉ1	Network 2
// Ritter's Cove	Network 2	RTÉ1
Touché Turtle	Network 2	RTÉ1
Lassie	Network 2	RTÉ1
The Famous Five	Network 2	RTÉ1
/ Dogtanian and the Three Muskehounds	Network 2	RTÉ1
T-Bag	Network 2	RTÉ1
The Henderson Kids	RTÉ1	Network 2

== Ongoing television programmes ==
=== 1960s ===
- RTÉ News: Nine O'Clock (1961–present)
- RTÉ News: Six One (1962–present)
- The Late Late Show (1962–present)

=== 1970s ===
- Sports Stadium (1973–1997)
- The Late Late Toy Show (1975–present)
- RTÉ News on Two (1978–2014)
- Bosco (1979–1996)
- The Sunday Game (1979–present)

=== 1980s ===
- Today Tonight (1982–1992)
- Mailbag (1982–1996)
- Glenroe (1983–2001)
- Live at 3 (1986–1997)
- Saturday Live (1986–1999)
- Questions and Answers (1986–2009)
- Dempsey's Den (1986–2010)
- Marketplace (1987–1996)
- Where in the World? (1987–1996)
- Know Your Sport (1987–1998)
- Nighthawks (1988–1992)
- Jo Maxi (1988–1993)
- Kenny Live (1988–1999)
- Fair City (1989–present)
- RTÉ News: One O'Clock (1989–present)

== Ending this year ==
- 6 March – Rapid Roulette (1986–1990)

== See also ==
- 1990 in Ireland
