= 1989 in Irish television =

The following is a list of events relating to television in Ireland from 1989.

== Events ==
- 18 January – After a long absence for several years, British children's cult favourite Worzel Gummidge returns to Irish television screens. The series airs on Network 2 as part of Dempsey's Den.
- 5 February – The world's first commercial DBS system, Sky Television, goes on air in the United Kingdom and Ireland.
- 23 March - RTÉ Weather is sponsored by Telecom Eireann.
- 21 April – The first People in Need Telethon is broadcast by RTÉ.
- 10 May – American television sitcom Thirtysomething is broadcast in Ireland for the first time.
- 14 September – British children's stop motion animated series Postman Pat begins airing for the very first time ever on Irish television on Network 2 as part of Dempsey's Den after only airing in Northern Ireland and several parts of the Republic via access to British television. Also added to Thursday's lineup of children's programmes on Dempsey's Den includes the debut of the British animated series for preschoolers Spot (which was translated and dubbed into Irish as Echtrai Bhrain) and the return of television's very first animated prime time sitcom The Flintstones.
- 18 September – Irish television soap Fair City is first transmitted.
- 26 December – The Fireman Sam Christmas special Snow Business goes to air on Network 2 but the series itself won't return to air on RTÉ until 13 March 2000.
- Undated – US prime time soap opera Knots Landing starts being broadcast for the first time on Irish television on RTÉ Television.
- Undated – The American animation studio Murakami-Wolf-Swenson launches a sister company called Fred Wolf Films in Dublin.

== Debuts ==
=== RTÉ 1 ===
- 15 May – Ffizz (1987–1989)
- 18 September – Fair City (1989–present)
- 16 October – RTÉ News: One O'Clock (1989–present)
- 22 October – The Secret Garden (1987)
- 7 November – Major Dad (1989–1993)
- Undated – Knots Landing (1979–1993)

=== Network 2 ===
- 9 January – Murphy Brown (1988–1998)
- 10 January – Wildfire (1986)
- 11 January – Degrassi Junior High (1987–1989)
- 14 January – Kidsongs (1987–1998)
- 18 January – Storybreak (1985–1987, 1993–1994)
- 6 February – Steel Riders (1987)
- 6 March – City Tails (1988)
- 23 March – Doctor Snuggles (1979–1980)
- 3 April – Strangers (1989)
- 13 April – Wil Cwac Cwac (1982–1986)
- 8 May – Adventures on Kythera (1991–1992)
- 9 May – The Secret Lives of Waldo Kitty (1975)
- 10 May – Thirtysomething (1987–1991)
- 11 May – Cornflakes for Tea (1981)
- 11 May – Wizbit (1986–1988)
- 15 May – Spartakus and the Sun Beneath the Sea (1985–1987)
- 18 May – Dramarama (1983–1989)
- 13 June – Amigo and Friends (1979–1982)
- 14 July – M*U*S*H (1975–1976)
- 22 July – Joint Account (1989–1990)
- 3 August – Zoo Family (1985–1986)
- 4 August – Around the World with Willy Fog (1983)
- 9 August – Fraidy Cat (1975)
- 14 August – Wacky and Packy (1975)
- 14 September – Postman Pat (1981, 1991, 1994, 1996, 2004–2008)
- 14 September – Spot (1987–1993)
- 8 October – Game, Set and Match (1988)
- 14 October – The Nutt House (1989)
- 30 October – Count Duckula (1988–1993)
- 18 November – The Ginger Tree (1989)
- 24 November – The Mahabharata (1989)
- 29 November – Alias the Jester (1985–1986)
- 25 December – Christmas Everyday (1986)
- 25 December – Worzel Gummidge: A Cup o' Tea and a Slice o' Cake (1980)
- 26 December – Fireman Sam: Snow Business (1988)

=== UTV ===
- Undated – Kelly (1989–2005)

== Changes of network affiliation ==
Shows	Moved from	Moved to
The Flintstones	RTÉ1	Network 2
The Road Runner Show	RTÉ1	Network 2
Into the Labyrinth	RTÉ1	Network 2
The Raccoons	RTÉ1	Network 2
Sesame Street	RTÉ1	Network 2
Worzel Gummidge	RTÉ1	Network 2
Cockleshell Bay	RTÉ1	Network 2
/ Ovide Video	RTÉ1	Network 2
Our Gang	RTÉ1	Network 2
Doctor Dolittle	RTÉ1	Network 2

== Ongoing television programmes ==
=== 1960s ===
- RTÉ News: Nine O'Clock (1961–present)
- RTÉ News: Six One (1962–present)
- The Late Late Show (1962–present)

=== 1970s ===
- Sports Stadium (1973–1997)
- The Late Late Toy Show (1975–present)
- RTÉ News on Two (1978–2014)
- Bosco (1979–1996)
- The Sunday Game (1979–present)

=== 1980s ===
- Today Tonight (1982–1992)
- Mailbag (1982–1996)
- Glenroe (1983–2001)
- Rapid Roulette (1986–1990)
- Live at 3 (1986–1997)
- Saturday Live (1986–1999)
- Questions and Answers (1986–2009)
- Dempsey's Den (1986–2010)
- Marketplace (1987–1996)
- Where in the World? (1987–1996)
- Know Your Sport (1987–1998)
- Nighthawks (1988–1992)
- Jo Maxi (1988–1993)
- Kenny Live (1988–1999)

== Ending this year ==
- 6 April – The Floradora Folk (1988–1989)

== See also ==
- 1989 in Ireland
