= 1975 in Irish television =

The following is a list of events relating to television in Ireland from 1975.

== Events ==
- 6 January – RTÉ Television begins broadcasting News for the Deaf, the first daily broadcast of news for deaf people.
- 23 September – Going Strong, a series for the elderly presented by Bunny Carr and Ann O'Dwyer is first aired.
- 25 September – Mr. Men gets its very first airing in Ireland on RTÉ. It is a UK children's animated series, based on the hugely popular children's books by Roger Hargreaves. The series had previously only been available to viewers who could receive UK television airings, including the BBC where it originally started airing.
- October – Geraldine McInerney becomes the first female newsreader on RTÉ Television.
- Undated – Oliver Maloney is appointed Director-General of RTÉ.

== Debuts ==
- 23 September – (United Kingdom) Follyfoot (1971–1973)
- 25 September – (United Kingdom) Mr. Men (1974–1976)
- 13 December - The Late Late Toy Show (1975–present)
- Undated – Trom agus Éadrom (1975–1985)

== Ongoing television programmes ==
- RTÉ News: Nine O'Clock (1961–present)
- RTÉ News: Six One (1962–present)
- The Late Late Show (1962–present)
- The Riordans (1965–1979)
- Quicksilver (1965–1981)
- Seven Days (1966–1976)
- Wanderly Wagon (1967–1982)
- Hall's Pictorial Weekly (1971–1980)
- Sports Stadium (1973–1997)

== Ending this year ==
- 27 June – Password (1961–1975)

== See also ==
- 1975 in Ireland
