= Rapid Roulette =

Irish television quiz show

- Genre: Light entertainment
- Presented by: Maurie Taylor (1986-1987); Maxi (1987-1990)
- Country of origin: Ireland
- Original language: English
- No. of series: 4
- No. of episodes: 104

Production
- Production locations: RTÉ Television Centre, Donnybrook, Dublin 4, Ireland
- Camera setup: Multi-camera
- Running time: 30 minutes
- Production companies: Green Apple Productions; Strongbow

Original release
- Network: RTÉ 1
- Release: 30 September 1986 – 6 March 1990

Rapid Roulette is an Irish television quiz show. Four contestants compete to answer quick-fire general knowledge questions to win cash and prizes. The title refers to the show's roulette wheel that contestants spin throughout the course of the game to determine their cash and/or prizes.

The programme ran between 30 September 1986 and 6 March 1990 and was produced by Green Apple Productions, and later by Strongbow, for RTÉ.

== Presenters ==
The series was originally hosted by actor Maurie Taylor, who left the show after the first series and was replaced by former singer Maxi.
