= 1973 in Irish television =

The following is a list of events relating to television in Ireland from 1973.

== Events ==
- 6 January – Long running US children's educational series Sesame Street makes its premiere in Northern Ireland on UTV. Despite already airing on RTÉ in Ireland since debuting in 1971, airings of the series on UTV are also available in various parts of the Republic.
- February – The Broadcasting Review Committee published an interim report recommending the establishment of a second television channel for the Republic of Ireland. It is envisaged that it will broadcast a mix of domestic and foreign programming.
- 14 March – Dr Conor Cruise O'Brien is appointed Minister for Posts and Telegraphs.
- Undated – Figures published in the RTÉ Annual Report suggest that 77% (542,000) of households in the Republic of Ireland now have a television set. Of these 530,000 have a television licence and 27,000 have colour televisions.

== Debuts ==
=== RTÉ ===
- 5 April – (United States) The Jetsons (1962–1963, 1985–1987)
- 18 June – If the Cap Fits (1973)
- 22 September – Sports Stadium (1973–1997)
- 5 October – (France) The Adventures of Babar (1968)

=== UTV ===
- 6 January – (United States) Sesame Street (1969–present)

== Ongoing television programmes ==
- RTÉ News: Nine O'Clock (1961–present)
- RTÉ News: Six One (1962–present)
- The Late Late Show (1962–present)
- The Riordans (1965–1979)
- Quicksilver (1965–1981)
- Seven Days (1966–1976)
- Wanderly Wagon (1967–1982)
- Hall's Pictorial Weekly (1971–1980)

== Ending this year ==
- Undated – If the Cap Fits (1973)

== Births ==
- 23 May – Ryan Tubridy, broadcaster and writer
- 24 June – Brendan Courtney, television presenter and stylist
- 24 August – Jenny Huston, radio and television presenter
- 5 November – Gráinne Seoige, television presenter
- 14 December – Amanda Byram, television personality
- Undated – Sybil Mulcahy, journalist and television presenter
- Undated – Tomas O'Suilleabhain, actor

== See also ==
- 1973 in Ireland
