= 1974 in Irish television =

The following is a list of events relating to television in Ireland from 1974.

== Events ==
- May – In its long-awaited report, the Broadcasting Review Committee endorses a second television channel for Ireland.
- Undated – The limit on the number of households that can be connected to high-specification aerial is abolished. Furthermore, it is agreed that RTÉ will receive a percentage of gross rental income from television aerial contractors by way of compensation for the estimated loss of advertising revenue RTÉ will experience due to competition with other television stations.
- Undated – The cable television company RTÉ Relays Ltd (later Cablelink) is established.

== Ongoing television programmes ==
- RTÉ News: Nine O'Clock (1961–present)
- RTÉ News: Six One (1962–present)
- The Late Late Show (1962–present)
- The Riordans (1965–1979)
- Quicksilver (1965–1981)
- Seven Days (1966–1976)
- Wanderly Wagon (1967–1982)
- Hall's Pictorial Weekly (1971–1980)
- Sports Stadium (1973–1997)

== Births ==
- 18 April – Lorraine Pilkington, actress
- 1 October – Keith Duffy, singer-songwriter, actor, drummer, dancer and television presenter
- Undated – Victoria Smurfit, actress

== See also ==
- 1974 in Ireland
