= Marketplace (Irish TV programme) =

- Genre: Finance and business affairs
- Created by: RTÉ News
- Presented by: Patrick Kinsella; Gavin Duffy; Bryan Dobson; Gary Agnew; Miriam O'Callaghan; Ingrid Miley; George Lee
- Country of origin: Ireland

Production
- Production locations: Studio 2, RTÉ Television Centre, Donnybrook, Dublin 4
- Running time: 30–35 minutes

Original release
- Network: RTÉ Two; Network 2 RTÉ One
- Release: 3 October 1987 – 3 April 1996

Related
- Today Tonight; Prime Time

Marketplace is an Irish finance and business current affairs television programme that was broadcast on RTÉ Television. It was first broadcast on 3 October 1987 and was presented at various times by Patrick Kinsella, Gavin Duffy, Gary Agnew, Miriam O'Callaghan, Ingrid Miley and George Lee. Marketplace was broadcast for the last time on 3 April 1996. The programme noted for its in-depth analysis of political, business and financial matters.

There is clips of it on Frank Dunlop about Quarryvale in 1993 and Denis O'Brien in 1995 programmes of Reeling in the Years.

During Christmas 2021 the complete of all 9 series was made available on RTE Player to celebrate 60 years of television.

== See also ==
- List of programmes broadcast by Telefís Éireann
