= Challenging Times =

1991 Irish TV quiz show

- Genre: Quiz show
- Created by: Seán Hogan
- Presented by: Kevin Myers
- Country of origin: Ireland
- Original language: English
- No. of seasons: 11
- No. of episodes: 165

Production
- Producer: Mick McCarthy
- Running time: 25 minutes per episode

Original release
- Network: Network 2
- Release: 1991 – 31 May 2001

Challenging Times is a television quiz show for teams representing higher education institutes in Ireland, both those in the Republic of Ireland and those in Northern Ireland. It was televised by Raidió Teilifís Éireann (RTÉ) from 1991 to 2001, sponsored by The Irish Times, and presented by Kevin Myers, then a columnist with that newspaper. The programme used a quizbowl format similar to that of University Challenge in the United Kingdom (Similar to the short-lived Australian version of University Challenge, the only difference is that the starter questions are worth five points, as opposed to ten on University Challenge), which is itself a licensed version of the College Bowl format popular in the United States. Each year, 16 teams qualified for the televised knockout stages, with two teams of three competing in each programme up to the final.

== Production ==
Filming locations included RTÉ's Studio 1, the lecture theatre of St. Vincent's University Hospital and University College Dublin's O'Reilly Hall.

The programme was cancelled after the 2001 series, at a time when RTÉ was in financial difficulties. The final of that series was postponed at short notice and an episode of The Simpsons was broadcast instead. Kevin Myers later complained that RTÉ had given The Irish Times no notice that the series was being discontinued, though RTÉ disputed this contention.

== Notable events ==
The 1997 final was notable for its controversial ending. DCU led 175 to UL's 170. Myers began to ask the final question: "He was born in Australia in 1902, of Irish parents..." A DCU contestant buzzed in and answered "Ned Kelly" as the buzzer sounded to mark the end. An incorrect answer would mean a five-point penalty and a tie-break, but Myers ruled that the quiz had ended before the incorrect answer was given, and thus DCU won 175–170. (The controversial question actually referred to the writer Francis Stuart.)

== Finals ==
Year	Winner	Runner-up
1991	St Patrick's College, Maynooth	University of Limerick
1992	St Patrick's College, Maynooth	Trinity College Dublin
1993	University College, Cork	Bolton Street College of Technology
1994	University College, Cork	Cork Regional Technical College
1995	University College, Galway	University of Limerick
1996	University College, Galway	Cork Regional Technical College
1997	Dublin City University	University of Limerick
1998	University College Dublin	Dublin Institute of Technology
1999	National University of Ireland, Maynooth	Dublin Institute of Technology
2000	National College of Ireland	National University of Ireland, Galway
2001	University College, Cork	National University of Ireland, Galway

=== Roll of honour ===
The Universities Act, 1997 substantially altered a number of third-level institutions, so this list unites the results of several colleges with their predecessors.

Institution	Wins	Runners-up	Winning seasons
NUI Maynooth and St Patrick's College	3	0	1991, 1992, 1999
University College Cork	3	0	1993, 1994, 2001
NUI Galway and University College, Galway	2	2	1995, 1996
Dublin City University	1	0	1997
National College of Ireland	1	0	2000
University College Dublin	1	0	1998
University of Limerick	0	3	
Dublin Institute of Technology and Bolton Street	0	3	
Cork RTC	0	2	
Trinity College Dublin	0	1	

Other institutions that appeared on Challenging Times but did not reach a final:

- Mary Immaculate College of Education, Limerick
- Dún Laoghaire Institute of Art, Design and Technology
- Galway-Mayo Institute of Technology
- Garda Síochána College
- Institute of Technology, Sligo (Sligo RTC)
- King's Inns
- Queen's University Belfast
- Waterford Institute of Technology
