= Where in the World? (Irish game show) =

- Genre: Light entertainment
- Developed by: Bill Keating and Danny McNally
- Directed by: Bill Keating
- Presented by: Marty Whelan (1987–1989); Theresa Lowe (1989–1996)
- Starring: Fran Dempsey; Major to Minor; Cian Harley
- Country of origin: Ireland
- Original language: English
- No. of series: 9

Production
- Producer: Bill Keating
- Production locations: Studio 1, RTÉ Television Centre, Donnybrook, Dublin 4
- Camera setup: Multi-camera
- Running time: 30–50 minutes

Original release
- Network: RTÉ One
- Release: 4 October 1987 – 7 April 1996

Where in the World? is an Irish quiz show presented firstly by Marty Whelan and subsequently by Theresa Lowe that was broadcast for nine series between 1987 and 1996. The show featured two teams of four made up of two families, answering a series of geography-based questions.

== Game Play ==
6 Rounds. 2 Families. 1 Holiday.

=== Round 1: Head to Head ===
Teams are made up of 4 family members. Each opposing family member goes head to head in a quick fire buzzer round. Two question are asked of each group. Starting at the top of the family table where the team captains go head to head to answer two questions, the person to buzz in first gets to answer first. If they get it wrong it is passed back to the opposing team member. Then the team members sitting next to the team captains go head to head as before, and this continues until the fourth team members go head to head. Each answer is worth £5.

=== Round 2: Observations ===
A piece of video is shown. The questions are based on the footage shown. The round is open to any team member to buzz into answer the question. Each answer is worth £5.

After this round the score board is show telling the audience, which team is in the lead.

=== Round 3: Mixed Bag ===
Questions are based on pictures, sounds, video clips and music. The questions are open to any team member. To answer a team member must buzz in. Each answer is worth £5.

=== Round 4:Anagrams ===
10 anagrams are shown on screen, the host reads out 10 clues. This is then followed by anagrams taken from letters of the previous answers. The questions are open to any team member. To answer a team member must buzz in. Each answer is worth £5.

=== Round 5: 60 seconds ===
A team member is selected to answer as many questions as they can in 60 seconds. The clock starts as soon as the first question is read out. Each answer is worth £10.

=== Round 6: Quick Fire Round ===
The questions are open to any team member to buzz in and answer. Each question is worth £5.

=== Winner's Way ===
The winning team selects a team member to go to Winner's Way. Winner's Way has a board consisting of 16 boxes. Each box contains the name of one of the five continents; Asia, Europe, America, Africa and Australia.

The contestant is given 25 seconds on the clock. The clock start as soon as the host finishes reading the first question. The clock only counts down as the player answers a question and stops as soon as the player selects the next continent.

Each question is worth £20. To win the star prize of a holiday away the contestant must join up four squares on the board. This can be done Horizontally, Diagonally and Vertically, it can also be done in a box shape as shown on the table below.

America 1	Asia 2	Africa 3	Europe 4
Europe 5	Africa 6	America 7	Asia 8
Australia 9	Europe 10	Australia 11	Asia 12
Asia 13	Australia 14	Europe 15	America 16

== Presenters ==
Presented by Marty Whelan, from 1987 until 1989, when he left RTÉ to join the newly established rival radio station, Century Radio. Theresa Lowe presented it from 1989 until its final series in 1996, Lowe, subsequently left RTE and had practiced as a barrister and communications consultant. Whelan returned to RTE after the demise of century radio and has worked there ever since.
