= 1976 in Irish television =

The following is a list of events relating to television in the Republic of Ireland from 1976.

== Events ==
- 18 October – Minister for Posts and Telegraphs Conor Cruise O'Brien issues a directive to RTÉ, providing clarification on the organisations whose members are banned from broadcast. The move follows the issuing of the original directive regarding this issue in 1971.
- 21 December – The Broadcasting Authority (Amendment) Act becomes law. The Act includes amendments to Section 31 of the original 1960 Broadcasting Authority Act and the establishment of the Broadcasting Complaints Commission.

== Debuts ==
- 23 October – (United States) The Great Grape Ape Show (1975)
- 27 October – (United Kingdom) The Wombles (1973–1975)

== Ongoing television programmes ==
- RTÉ News: Nine O'Clock (1961–present)
- RTÉ News: Six One (1962–present)
- The Late Late Show (1962–present)
- The Riordans (1965–1979)
- Quicksilver (1965–1981)
- Wanderly Wagon (1967–1982)
- Hall's Pictorial Weekly (1971–1980)
- Sports Stadium (1973–1997)
- Trom agus Éadrom (1975–1985)
- The Late Late Toy Show (1975–present)

== Ending this year ==
- Unknown – Seven Days (1966–1976)

== Births ==
- 11 August – Claire Byrne, journalist and television presenter
- 16 September – Liz Bonnin, television presenter
- Undated – Dáithí Ó Sé, television presenter

== See also ==
- 1976 in Ireland
