= 1979 in Irish television =

The following is a list of events relating to television in Ireland from 1979.

== Events ==
- January – RTÉ establishes an internal working party to investigate the representation of women in news reporting. Their findings are published in April 1981.
- 8 April – UK children's television series Worzel Gummidge begins airing on RTÉ 1 two months after its screening debut in its original country.
- May – The Riordans is aired on television for the final time. It switches to the radio and continues until 1985.
- 4 June – The long-running children's television series Bosco begins an eight-part pilot series.
- 29 September–1 October – Coverage of Pope John Paul II's visit to Ireland is broadcast on RTÉ radio and television.
- 2 October – Mary McAleese debuts as a reporter on the current affairs programme Frontline.
- 12 December – Albert Reynolds is appointed as Minister for Posts and Telegraphs.

== Debuts ==
=== RTÉ 1 ===
- 7 January – (United Kingdom) Children of the New Forest (1977)
- 8 April – (United Kingdom) Worzel Gummidge (1979–1981)
- 5 June – (United States) Jana of the Jungle (1978)
- 2 October – (United Kingdom) To the Manor Born (1979–1981, 2007)
- 9 November – The Live Mike (1979–1982)

=== RTÉ 2 ===
- 4 June – Bosco (1979–1987)
- 8 July – The Sunday Game (1979–present)

== Ongoing television programmes ==
- RTÉ News: Nine O'Clock (1961–present)
- RTÉ News: Six One (1962–present)
- The Late Late Show (1962–present)
- Quicksilver (1965–1981)
- Wanderly Wagon (1967–1982)
- Hall's Pictorial Weekly (1971–1980)
- Sports Stadium (1973–1997)
- Trom agus Éadrom (1975–1985)
- The Late Late Toy Show (1975–present)
- RTÉ News on Two (1978–2014)

== Ending this year ==
- May – The Riordans (1965–1979)

== Births ==
- 20 March – Amy Huberman, actress and writer
- 16 August - Brian Ormond, singer and television presenter
- 9 October – Chris O'Dowd, comedian and actor
- 17 October – Leigh Arnold, actress
- 24 November – Kirsteen O'Sullivan, television presenter
- Undated – Aisling O'Loughlin, journalist, newsreader and presenter

== See also ==
- 1979 in Ireland
