= Know Your Sport =

Irish sports quiz show

- Genre: Sport
- Created by: Mary Hogan
- Presented by: George Hamilton
- Starring: Jimmy Magee; Mary Hogan
- Country of origin: Ireland
- Original language: English

Production
- Production locations: Studio 1, RTÉ Television Centre, Donnybrook, Dublin 4, Ireland
- Camera setup: Multi-camera
- Running time: 30 minutes

Original release
- Network: RTÉ One, Network 2
- Release: 8 October 1987 – 1 April 1998

Know Your Sport is an Irish sports quiz show produced by RTÉ between 8 October 1987 and 1 April 1998. The show was presented by George Hamilton and featured Jimmy Magee and Mary Hogan as scorekeeper.

Rounds of questions included the "specialist subject", "great moment in sport", "mystery guest" and "buzzer" rounds.

In 2009, an appeal to re-introduce the show to RTÉ's schedule gathered support on networking website, Facebook.

It was on RTE Player September 2017 to tributes for the death of Jimmy Magee again from Christmas 2021 to celebrate 60 years of television.
