= Mailbag =

Television series

- Presented by: Arthur Murphy
- Country of origin: Ireland
- Original language: English

Production
- Running time: 10-30 minutes

Original release
- Network: RTÉ One
- Release: 1982 – 1996

Related
- Review of the Week

Mailbag is an Irish TV programme which was presented by Arthur Murphy and broadcast on RTÉ One for a fourteen-year period, from 1982 to 1996.

The presentation, which was initially 10 minutes in length, dealt with viewers letters concerning RTÉ TV programmes and broadcasting in general. The programme later became established in a half-hour Saturday-evening time slot.

Murphy repeated the Mailbag concept into the 2010s, broadcasting an "E-mail Bag" segment on Today FM radio's The Ray D'Arcy Show.
