= Quicksilver (Irish game show) =

Irish quiz show hosted by Bunny Carr from 1965 to 1981

- Title card
- Genre: Quiz
- Presented by: Bunny Carr
- Theme music composer: Norman Metcalfe
- Country of origin: Ireland
- Original language: English

Production
- Running time: 27 minutes
- Production company: RTÉ

Original release
- Network: Teilifís Éireann/RTÉ1
- Release: 1965 – 1981

Quicksilver is a television quiz show produced and broadcast in Ireland by RTÉ and hosted by Bunny Carr from 1965 to 1981. The show was broadcast each week from a different Irish town, with a live audience. Competitors were selected from the audience by drawing numbered tickets, prompting many amusing exchanges as they competed for small monetary prizes by answering a series of trivia questions. Musical accompaniment was provided by organist Norman Metcalfe, who frequently provided musical hints to the answers.

The centre-piece was a large board with 30 illuminated numbers that indicated remaining prizes. After the host read the question, the lights went out one-by-one (approximately one each second) until either the contestant gave the correct answer or seven lights went out. With each correct answer, each remaining light became worth an increasing amount of money – pre-decimalisation, the progression went 1 shilling, 2 shillings, 5 shillings, 10 shillings, £1, and £5; post-decimalisation, it went 5p, 10p, 20p, 50p, £1, and £5; towards the end of the run, the 5p level was removed (contestants correspondingly started with a 10p question) and a £10 level added after the £5 level. During the game, the contestant had two opportunities to call "Stop the lights!”, passing on the question and preventing the potential prize from decreasing further.

When 13 lights remained, the host gave the contestant a bonus challenge from "Card #13." The challenge could take many forms, such as singing a verse from a favourite song, or answering all of the questions they had been asked during the game so far. If completed, the contestant won an extra cash prize regardless of the result of the game.

In addition, a secret number was designated before the game, shown to the home audience, but not to the studio audience. The first contestant of the show, if any, to have the lights stopped exactly on the secret number won a bonus "super prize" regardless of the outcome of the game.

The contestant could end the game after any correct answer and take the prize they had based on that question's prize level and the number of lights remaining. For instance, a contestant who answered the 50p question with 20 lights remaining could end the game and take £10 (20 lights times 50p). The contestant's game also ended either when the contestant correctly answered a question at the highest money level or ran out of lights. In addition, if time ran out during a contestant's game, the contestant immediately won whatever prize they had at that point. For instance, a contestant who had a full board of 30 lights when time was called and was answering a 5p-level question would win £1.50.

At the end of the show, all of the contestants faced one final question on the buzzers against a full board of 30 lights, and the contestant who answered the question correctly won £1 per light remaining. The show's catchphrase "Stop The Lights!" is still used by Irish people to indicate mock amazement.
