= RTÉ Television =

Television department of Ireland's national broadcaster, Raidió Teilifís Éireann

- Type: Statutory corporation
- Industry: Broadcasting
- Founded: 1 June 1960
- Headquarters: RTÉ Television Centre, Donnybrook, Dublin, Ireland
- Area served: Republic of Ireland and Northern Ireland; Worldwide (via internet)
- Key people: Glen Killane (managing director of television)
- Products: Television
- Owner: Raidió Teilifís Éireann
- Website: http://www.rte.ie/tv/

RTÉ Television is a department of Raidió Teilifís Éireann (RTÉ), Ireland's public service broadcaster. Its first channel was Telefís Éireann, which began broadcasting on 31 December 1961. Since the 1960s, RTÉ Television has added channels and digital television service.

== Channels ==
Linear

- RTÉ One (launched in 1961 as Telefís Éireann, known as RTÉ from 1966, HD service launched on 16 December 2013)
- RTÉ2 (launched in 1978, known from 1988 to 2004 as Network 2, HD service launched in October 2011)
- RTÉ News (launched on 12 June 2008 as RTÉ News Now)
- RTÉ KIDSjr (launched on 27 May 2011)
- RTÉ One +1 (launched on 27 May 2011 sharing with RTÉjr, 24 hour introduced from 19 February 2019)
- RTÉ2+1 (launched on 19 February 2019, airs from 7pm Monday to Friday, 12:20pm Saturday and Sunday)

Former Channels

=== IPTV ===
- RTÉ Food (available through RTÉ Player)
- RTÉ Archive (available through RTÉ Player)

=== Proposed channels ===
- RTÉ Ireland.
- RTÉ Arts & Culture (IPTV only).
- RTÉ Comedy (IPTV only)
- RTÉ Sport (IPTV only)
- RTÉ Lifestyle (IPTV only)
- RTÉ Young Adults (IPTV only)
- RTÉ Education (IPTV only)
- RTÉ Business (IPTV only)

== History ==
Although Ireland was one of the first countries in Europe to adopt radio communication, it was a relative latecomer to regular television. Unlike France (1935), United Kingdom (1936) and Italy (1954), the Government of Ireland did not broadcast regular television for the population until December 1961. Before the launch of RTÉ One, a limited television service was available from Northern Ireland through BBC Northern Ireland and UTV. The Irish government considered television a luxury and did not allow Radio Éireann to set up television service for several years.

During the late 1950s, a television committee was formed to set up Irish television service with as little financial commitment from Dublin as possible. It initially recommended a service similar to the UK's ITV, using five mountains as transmission sites which were also equipped with FM radio transmitters. Because Taoiseach Éamon de Valera was wary of television, nothing occurred until Seán Lemass succeeded him in 1959. A year later, Radio Éireann was converted from an arm of the Department of Posts and Telegraphs to a quasi-state body and given responsibility for television. Eamonn Andrews was appointed chairman.

Telefís Éireann began broadcasting at 19:00 on 31 December 1961. It was originally intended to open on 25 December of that year, but Andrews gave the Radio Éireann staff time off for Christmas. The opening address by de Valera—now President of Ireland—described the benefits and disadvantages of the new medium. There were other messages from Cardinal d'Alton and Lemass, followed by a live concert from the Gresham Hotel in Dublin. The programme, which was a countdown to the New Year, was hosted by Andrews and included appearances by Patrick O'Hagan, the Artane Boys' Band and Michael O'Hehir.

Television opened a new world to the Irish people. Controversial topics such as abortion and contraception were openly discussed in television programmes such as The Late Late Show, which began in July 1962 and continues on RTÉ One.

RTÉ was the first broadcaster to use the System I 625-line system in 1962, two years before the launch of BBC Two in that format. Its first colour broadcast was transmitted in 1968, however, a mistake in standards conversion may have transmitted the 1968 Wimbledon Men's Finals in colour. The first programme made in colour by RTÉ was the documentary special, John Hume's Derry, shown under the 7 Days banner. Since 1969, RTÉ can transmit programmes made in colour which were imported from UK and the US. Ireland's first outside broadcasts in colour were the Railway Cup Finals on 17 March 1971 and the country's hosting of the Eurovision Song Contest the following month. The first RTÉ studio in Donnybrook was equipped for colour broadcasts in 1972, followed by the news studios in 1974. The last studio in RTÉ to be converted to colour (in 1976) was Studio 1, home of The Late Late Show.

In 1977 a new government came to power, and quickly authorised a second television station run by RTÉ. The new station, RTÉ 2, went on the air on 2 November 1978; the opening night featured a variety show from Cork Opera House. RTÉ 2's remit was to provide alternative television; its schedule included live relays of British programmes and original programming. In 1987, RTÉ 2 was renamed Network 2 to revive flagging ratings; many viewers preferred BBC Northern Ireland or UTV, both of which are accessible in much of the Republic. In 1992 RTÉ became a shareholder in Euronews, a 24-hour European news channel operated by members of the European Broadcasting Union.

John Bowman wrote Window and Mirror: RTÉ Television 1961–2011, a history of the service, for its 50th anniversary. The book was launched by Taoiseach Enda Kenny at the National Museum in Dublin on 23 November 2011. TV50 was launched by RTÉ on 26 December 2011 to celebrate 50 years of Irish television in 2012.

== Studios ==
RTÉ's main studio complex is the Television Centre in Donnybrook, Dublin. A second production studio opened in Cork in 1995, and became a large contributor to radio and television network output.

== 2012 budget ==
	RTÉ One	RTÉ Two	Other channels*	TG4 support
Licence fees	56,139,000	53,456,000	1,752,000	7,764,000
Commercial income	65,351,000	30,007,000	N/A	N/A
Total income	121,490,000	83,463,000	1,752,000	7,764,000
Expenditures	129,737,000	91,313,000	1,752,000	7,764,000
Profit/loss	(8,247,000)	(7,850,000)	0	0

*Includes digital radio services.

== Programming ==
RTÉ Television has five scheduling strands. RTÉ One, aimed at a mainstream audience, is the main broadcaster of news, current affairs and original drama. RTÉ2 provides the majority of entertainment, comedy, children's programming and sports. RTÉ One +1 airs from 7 pm as RTÉ One's timeshift channel, time-sharing with RTÉjr (which begins at 7 am daily with programming for pre-school children). The RTÉ News channel provides rotating broadcasts of RTÉ One's main news programmes.

== Recent programmes ==
=== 2012–2013 season ===
On 8 August 2012, RTÉ Television confirmed its 2012–2013 autumn-winter schedule. The season saw the return of the critically acclaimed Irish drama series Love/Hate for a third season and Raw for a fifth season, with the addition of the co-produced Irish drama The Fall (starring Gillian Anderson). The Late Late Show, The Frontline and The Saturday Night Show also returned. RTÉ was Europe's first broadcaster to present the new seasons of US series The Good Wife, Homeland, CSI Las Vegas, CSI New York and New Girl. The season featured 114 new and returning home-produced programmes (including the Voice of Ireland, Operation Transformation and Celebrity Bainisteoir, and RTÉ Television confirmed new programming for its digital channels.

=== 2015–2016 season ===
The broadcaster introduced its 2015–2016 season in August 2015. It included the return of The Voice of Ireland, The Late Late Show, the Saturday Night Show with Ray D'Arcy (all RTÉ One), Gotham and New Girl (both RTÉ2).

=== 2018–2019 season ===
RTÉ Television announced the 2018–2019 seasons for RTÉ One and RTÉ2 on 16 August 2018. New Irish-produced dramas included Resistance (based on events surrounding the Irish War of Independence and a sequel of 2016's popular drama series Rebellion) and Taken Down, an Irish drama series starring Aissa Maiga, Lynn Rafferty, Brian Gleeson, Orla Fitzgerald and Barry Ward. RTÉ2 is focusing on new Irish comedy, including Amy Huberman's Finding Joy, the return of Bridget & Eamon and Podge and Rodge. Imported dramas include BBC America's Killing Eve and season three of The Handmaid's Tale.

=== 2026-2027 ===
RTÉ announced 2026-2027 season on 26 August 2026.

== International availability ==
RTÉ Player International offers audiences outside the Republic of Ireland to stream content available across RTÉ's channels and archived content. The service is a subscription based service.

Meanwhile, RTÉ's channels are widely available in Northern Ireland through multiple television service providers. However, some content is blocked due to broadcasting rights issues.

In January 2007, RTÉ announced plans to launch a channel (with the working title of RTÉ International) which would offer programmes in Great Britain. As of 2008, the proposed launch of this channel was "shelved".

== Online content ==
In March 2007, content from RTÉ One (and its sister network, RTÉ Two) became available on RTÉ.ie. In May 2009, RTÉ launched RTÉ Player (an on-demand catch-up service).

RTÉ News, current-affairs programmes and specials, such as the St. Patrick's Day parade and Easter Mass, were freely streamed live around the world on 17 March 2007. RTÉ have launched an international version of the RTÉ Player, which provides access to the RTÉ News channel as a live stream and access to many Irish-made programmes.

== Presentation ==
RTÉ introduced digital on-screen graphics for RTÉ One and RTÉ Two in 2004. This was somewhat controversial, despite TV3 (now known as Virgin Media Television) using them from its inception and TG4 since 1999. In late 2004, RTÉ produced the third series of the talent show You're a Star in widescreen (16:9 aspect ratio). Although this was RTÉ's first official 16:9 production, the programme was not available to viewers in 16:9 format even on digital platforms. Instead, it was broadcast in 14:9 "letterbox" format. In March 2005, RTÉ One and RTÉ Two began broadcasting some programmes in 16:9 format on digital platforms; this was followed by a complete switchover to 16:9 output on both channels in May 2005, except for a few programmes.

== Genres ==
Since 2003, RTÉ has branded its television programmes in a number of genres. Each genre operates broadly under a commissioning editor, except for RTÉ News and Current Affairs (separately structured and controlled). The genres are;

- RTÉ Arts – producing cultural shows and documentaries
- RTÉ Diversity – producing programming which promotes intercultural dialogue, Irish language and people with disabilities
- RTÉ Religious – religious programming
- RTÉ Drama – soap operas and other drama series and shows
- RTÉ Education – educational programming for children and adults
- RTÉ Entertainment – chat shows, comedy and reality shows
- RTÉ Factual – current documentaries and scientific programming
- RTÉ History – historical documentaries
- RTÉ Music – all types of music, including classical, traditional Irish and pop-rock
- RTÉ News and Current Affairs – news and current affairs
- RTÉ Sport – Irish and international sporting events
- RTÉ Weather – weather in Ireland (provided by Met Éireann) and global forecasts
- RTÉ Young People's Programming – shows for children and teenagers

== See also ==
- Television in the Republic of Ireland
