= 1879 in Ireland =

- Centuries: 17th; 18th; 19th; 20th; 21st
- Decades: 1850s; 1860s; 1870s; 1880s; 1890s
- See also: 1879 in the United Kingdom; Other events of 1879; List of years in Ireland

Events from the year 1879 in Ireland.

== Events ==
- Second year of the Irish Famine (1878–1880) which has its greatest impact in the "wet" West of Ireland where the potato harvest is greatly reduced, and the peat and cereal crops are too wet to harvest.
- 20 April – first of many "monster meetings" of tenant farmers held in Irishtown near Claremorris, County Mayo, marking the start of the Land War.
- 8 June – Charles Stewart Parnell at Westport, County Mayo meeting.
- 21 June – new Roman Catholic Thurles Cathedral consecrated.
- 16 August – Land League of Mayo founded at Castlebar.
- 21 August – claimed apparition at Knock, County Mayo, of the Blessed Virgin Mary, Saint Joseph, Saint John the Evangelist and Jesus Christ (as the Lamb of God).
- 21 October – Irish National Land League founded at Dublin.
  Full date unknown
  - Repeal of Convention Act 1793.
  - The Royal Dublin Society acquires its modern-day premises at Ballsbridge (15 acres (61,000 m^{2}) compared to forty acres (60,000 to 160,000 m^{2}) later achieved).
  - The Royal University of Ireland Act allows women to take university degrees on the same basis as men.
  - The Religious Sisters of Charity open Our Lady's Hospice in Harold's Cross, Dublin.
  - The Star of Erin Music Hall (modern day Olympia Theatre) is established on Crampton Court, Dublin.

== Arts and literature ==
- Charles Kickham's novel Knocknagow, or The Homes of Tipperary is published.

== Sport ==
- The Irish Rugby Football Union (IRFU) is founded, being an amalgamation of the Irish Football Union and the Northern Football Union of Ireland.
- 20 September – Cliftonville F.C. is founded in Belfast.

== Births ==
- 16 February – Hubert de Burgh, cricketer and naval officer (died 1960).
- 20 March – Terence MacSwiney, playwright and poet, member of First Dáil, Sinn Féin Lord Mayor of Cork (died on 74th day of hunger strike, 1920 in England).
- 9 April – William Meldon, cricketer (died 1957 in England).
- 20 April – Robert Wilson Lynd, journalist and nationalist (died 1949 in England).
- 22 May – Jack White, soldier, trade unionist, one of the co-founders of the Irish Citizen Army (died 1946).
- 30 May – Elizabeth Cronin, traditional singer (died 1956).
- 1 June – Freeman Wills Crofts, detective novelist and railway engineer (died 1957 in England).
- 2 June – Patrick Keohane, navy officer, member of Robert Falcon Scott's Antarctic Terra Nova Expedition (died 1950).
- 11 July – Hugh Kennedy, only Attorney-General of Southern Ireland, first Attorney-General of the Irish Free State and first Chief Justice of the Irish Free State (died 1936).
- 15 July
  - Margaret Buckley, president of Sinn Féin from 1937 to 1950 (died 1962).
  - Joseph Campbell, poet and lyricist (died 1944).
  - James Crichton, soldier, recipient of the Victoria Cross for gallantry in 1918 at Crèvecœur, France (died 1961).
- 17 July – Seumas O'Sullivan, poet and editor (died 1958).
- 3 August – Mary Devenport O'Neill, poet and dramatist (died 1967).
- 20 August – Tom Barry, hurler (London-Irish) (died 1969).
- 8 September – Hugo Flinn, Fianna Fáil TD (died 1943).
- 23 September – E. Temple Thurston, poet, playwright and author (died 1933).
- 15 October – Sara Allgood, actress (died 1950 in the United States).
- 10 November – Patrick Pearse, teacher, barrister, poet, writer, nationalist and political activist, one of the leaders of the Easter Rising, executed (died 1916).
- 4 December – Hamilton Harty, conductor and composer (died 1941).
- 7 December – Austin Stack, Sinn Féin MP and TD, member of First Dáil (died 1929).
- 11 December – Caitlín Brugha, née Kathleen Kingston, Sinn Féin TD (died 1959).
- Full date unknown – Sir Samuel Kelly, coal merchant, businessperson and philanthropist, founder of John Kelly Limited (died 1937).

== Deaths ==
- 22 January – Nevill Coghill, posthumous recipient of the Victoria Cross for gallantry at the Battle of Isandhlwana, South Africa (born 1852).
- 28 January – Hugh McNeile, Anglican churchman (born 1795).
- 19 April – Francis Kelly, surveyor, business agent, farmer, and politician in Canada (born 1803).
- 5 May – Isaac Butt, Irish Conservative Party MP and founder of the Home Rule League (born 1818).
- 17 May – John McClintock, 1st Baron Rathdonnell, politician and Lord Lieutenant of County Louth 1866–1879 (born 1798).
- 9 June – Edward Butler, lawyer and politician in Australia (died 1823).
- 28 June – John Pitt Kennedy, British military engineer, agricultural reformer and civil servant (born 1796).
- 10 July – John Byrne, soldier, recipient of the Victoria Cross for gallantry in 1854 at the Battle of Inkerman, Crimea (born 1832).
- 3 September – Walter Hamilton, soldier, recipient of the Victoria Cross for gallantry in 1879 at Futtehabad, Afghanistan (born 1856).
- 15 September – Thomas Roberts Ferguson, businessman and politician in Ontario (born 1818).
- 24 September – John Holmes, surveyor and politician in Ontario (born 1828).
- 29 September – Edmund Falconer, actor-manager and dramatist (born c. 1814).
- 6 November – Dennis Mahony, a founder of the Herald (modern-day Telegraph Herald) newspaper in Dubuque, Iowa (born 1821).

== See also ==
- 1879 in Scotland
- 1879 in Wales
