= 1968 in Northern Ireland =

- Centuries: 20th; 21st
- Decades: 1940s; 1950s; 1960s; 1970s; 1980s
- See also: 1968 in the United Kingdom; 1968 in Ireland; Other events of 1968; List of years in Northern Ireland

Events during the year 1968 in Northern Ireland.

== Incumbents ==
- Governor - The Lord Erskine of Rerrick (until 27 November), The Lord Grey of Naunton (from 27 November)
- Prime Minister - Terence O'Neill

== Events ==
=== January to June ===
- 8 January – Taoiseach Jack Lynch and Northern Ireland Prime Minister Terence O'Neill meet for talks in Dublin.
- March – Members of the Derry Housing Action Committee (DHAC) disrupt a meeting of Londonderry Corporation to protest at the lack of housing provision in the city.
- 5 April – Northern Ireland Transport Holding Company takes over operations from the Ulster Transport Authority, managing Northern Ireland Railways, Ulsterbus, Northern Ireland Carriers and Northern Ireland Airports.
- 27 April – The Northern Ireland Civil Rights Association (NICRA) holds a rally to protest at the banning of a Republican commemoration parade.
- 16 May – In a parliamentary by-election in Derry the Ulster Unionists retains the seat.
- 20 May – Terence O'Neill, Northern Ireland Prime Minister, is showered with eggs, flour and stones after a meeting of the Woodvale Unionist Association.
- May – Derry Housing Action Committee (DHAC) holds another protest at the Guildhall, Derry.
- 4 June – Lord Stonham, Minister of State at the Home Office with responsibility for Northern Ireland, begins a three-day visit.
- 20 June – Austin Currie, Nationalist Party MP at Stormont, with others, begins a protest about discrimination in housing allocation by 'squatting' (illegally occupying) in a house in Caledon, County Tyrone.
- 21 June – The annual conference of the Nationalist Party unanimously approves the protest action by Austin Currie in Caledon.
- 22 June – The Derry Housing Action Committee (DHAC) stages a protest by blocking the Lecky Road in the Bogside area of Derry.

=== July to December ===
- 3 July – As part of a series of protests against housing conditions in Derry, the Derry Housing Action Committee (DHAC) holds a sit-down protest on the newly opened second deck of the Craigavon Bridge in the city.
- 31 July – Ralph Grey is appointed as Governor of Northern Ireland.
- 22 August – The Society of Labour Lawyers (SLL) publishes an 'interim report' about discrimination in Northern Ireland. The report is heavily criticised by unionists.
- 24 August – First Civil Rights March: The Campaign for Social Justice (CSJ), the Northern Ireland Civil Rights Association (NICRA) and other groups hold the first 'civil rights march' in Northern Ireland from Coalisland to Dungannon, in County Tyrone. The rally is officially banned, but takes place and passes off without incident.
- 27 August – The Derry Housing Action Committee (DHAC) organises another protest in the Guildhall's council chamber. Afterwards it invites NICRA to organise a march in Derry.
- 28 August – Gerry Fitt, MP, tables a House of Commons motion, signed by 60 Labour Party backbenchers, criticising RUC action in Dungannon on 24 August, demanding that "citizens of Northern Ireland should be allowed the same rights of peaceful demonstration as those in other parts of the United Kingdom".
- 5 October – A civil rights march in Derry, which includes several Stormont and British MPs, is batoned off the streets by the Royal Ulster Constabulary, resulting in two days of serious rioting in Derry.
- 9 October – Following a student demonstration in Belfast, the People's Democracy is formed.
- 25 October – The New University of Ulster is opened in Coleraine, County Londonderry.
- 30 October – Taoiseach Jack Lynch calls for an end to partition to resolve the unrest.
- 4 November – Northern Ireland Prime Minister Terence O'Neill says there will be no end to partition without the consent of the Northern Ireland parliament.
- 22 November – Terence O'Neill announces five point plan to ease Catholic grievances on housing allocation and electoral law.
- 11 December – William Craig, NI Minister of Home Affairs, is dismissed from the Northern Ireland cabinet.
- 20 December – People's Democracy announce Belfast to Derry march.

=== Undated ===
- Allen McClay establishes the pharmaceutical company Galen in Craigavon.

== Arts and literature ==
- May – The Honest Ulsterman, a Northern Ireland literary magazine, is established by poet James Simmons; it continues until 2003.
- Derek Mahon's poems Night-Crossing published.

== Sport ==
=== Football ===
- Irish League

Winners: Glentoran

- Irish Cup

Winners: Crusaders 2 – 0 Linfield

- May 29 – George Best becomes the first Northern Irish footballer to pick up a European Cup winner medals as Manchester United F.C. defeat Benfica in the final at Wembley Stadium.
- September 18 – George Best is the star attraction as Manchester United beat Waterford City 3-1 at Lansdowne Road.

=== Golf ===
- Curtis Cup held at Royal County Down Golf Club (winners: United States).

== Births ==
- 12 March – Kieran McKeever, Derry GAA hurler and Gaelic footballer.
- April – John McCaffrey, fundraising professional.
- 9 May
  - Niall Donnelly, television journalist.
  - Ruth Kelly, British Labour politician, Secretary of State for Communities and Local Government and MP for Bolton West.
- 16 July – Colin Murphy, comedian.
- 12 August – Michael Legge, stand-up comedian.
- 14 August – Darren Clarke, golfer.
- 18 November – Barry Hunter, footballer and manager.
- 21 November – Peter Weir, Democratic Unionist Party MLA.
- 22 December – Stephen Smyth, cricketer.

=== Full date unknown ===
- Colin Harper, music journalist.
- Adrian McKinty, crime fiction author.

== Deaths ==
- 8 February – Louise McIlroy, Professor of Obstetrics and Gynaecology at the London School of Medicine for Women (born 1874).
- 11 September – Denis McCullough, Irish Volunteers and elected to the 4th Dáil Éireann (born 1883).
- 10 December – George Forrest, Ulster Unionist MP for Mid Ulster.
- 12 December – Sam Irving, footballer and football manager (born 1883).

=== Full date unknown ===
- William Conor, artist (born 1881).

== See also ==
- 1968 in Scotland
- 1968 in Wales
