= 1960 in Northern Ireland =

- Centuries: 20th; 21st
- Decades: 1940s; 1950s; 1960s; 1970s; 1980s
- See also: 1960 in the United Kingdom; 1960 in Ireland; Other events of 1960; List of years in Northern Ireland

Events during the year 1960 in Northern Ireland.

== Incumbents ==
- Governor - The Lord Wakehurst
- Prime Minister - Basil Brooke

== Events ==
- 16 March – Passenger liner SS Canberra is launched at the Harland & Wolff shipyard in Belfast for P&O.
- 6 April – Short SC.1 VTOL research aircraft makes its first transition from vertical to horizontal flight and back, flying from Belfast Harbour Airport.
- 13 April – MV Arlanza becomes the last passenger liner launched by Harland & Wolff in Belfast (for Royal Mail Line).

== Arts and literature ==
- 26 January – First staging of Sam Thompson's play Over the Bridge, at the Empire Theatre, Belfast.
- 13–18 February - Orson Welles opens for the last time in a stage production, his adaptation Chimes at Midnight with the Gate Theatre Company, at the Grand Opera House, Belfast (transferring in March to Dublin).

== Sport ==
=== Football ===
- Irish League

Winners: Glenavon

- Irish Cup

Winners: Linfield 5 - 1 Ards

== Births ==
- 23 April – Barry Douglas, classical pianist.
- 30 April – Colonel Tim Collins, British Commander in Iraq.
- 6 May – Roma Downey, actress and producer.
- 13 May – Michael Savage, Liberal Party of Canada Member of Parliament.
- 8 June – Peter Heather, historian.
- 7 July – Billy Wright, leader of the Loyalist Volunteer Force (died 1997).
- 20 August – Deirdre Madden, author.
- 27 August – Mark Caughey, footballer.
- 29 August
  - Dominic Bradley, SDLP MLA.
  - Thomas Burns, SDLP MLA.
- 10 October – Arlene McCarthy, Labour Party Member of the European Parliament.
- 25 November – Robert Dunlop, motorcycle racer (died 2008).
- 10 December – Kenneth Branagh, actor and director.

=== Full date unknown ===
- Ian McDonald, science fiction novelist.
- Jeff McWhinney, deaf community activist.

== Deaths ==
- 9 March – Jack Beattie, Labour politician (born 1886).
- 13 June – Ken McArthur, winner of the marathon race at the 1912 Summer Olympics for South Africa (born 1881).
- 20 July – Galbraith Lowry-Corry, 7th Earl Belmore, soldier and Deputy Lieutenant for County Fermanagh (born 1913).
- 1 September – Robert Moore, minister of religion and politician (born 1886).
- 25 October – Harry Ferguson, early aviator and developer of the modern agricultural tractor (born 1884).

== See also ==
- 1960 in Scotland
- 1960 in Wales
