= 1969 in Northern Ireland =

- Centuries: 20th; 21st
- Decades: 1940s; 1950s; 1960s; 1970s; 1980s
- See also: 1969 in the United Kingdom; 1969 in Ireland; Other events of 1969; List of years in Northern Ireland

Events during the year 1969 in Northern Ireland.

== Incumbents ==
- Governor - The Lord Grey of Naunton
- Prime Minister - Terence O'Neill (until 1 May), James Chichester-Clark (from 1 May)

== Events ==
- 1 January – The People's Democracy civil rights march leaves Belfast for Derry.
- 4 January – Militant loyalists, including off-duty members of the Ulster Special Constabulary (B-Specials), attack the civil rights marchers at Burntollet bridge in County Londonderry.
- 5 January – Riots in Derry leave over 100 people injured.
- 10 January – Civil rights protesters defy police orders to abandon a planned march.
- 27 January – Reverend Ian Paisley, hardline Protestant leader in Northern Ireland, is jailed for three months for illegal assembly.
- 24 February – 1969 Northern Ireland general election: The Ulster Unionist Party retains a majority of seats but fails to give Terence O'Neill a clear majority for his proposed reforms. This is the first (and only) election since 1929 to see changes to the constituencies: the Queen's University of Belfast seat is abolished and four new constituencies created in the Belfast suburbs.
- 22 March – Civil rights demonstrations take place all over Northern Ireland.
- 17 April – Bernadette Devlin, the 21-year-old student and civil rights campaigner, wins the Mid-Ulster by-election on the Unity ticket, defeating the widow of the previous (UUP) incumbent. She is the youngest female U.K. Member of Parliament ever up to this time (and for another 46 years).
- 20 April – British troops arrive in Northern Ireland to reinforce the Royal Ulster Constabulary.
- 28 April – Prime Minister of Northern Ireland, Terence O'Neill, resigns.
- 1 May – Major James Chichester-Clark succeeds Terence O'Neill as Northern Ireland's Prime Minister.
- 12 July – Rioting in Belfast, Derry and Dungiven follows Orange Institution parades.
- 1 August – A huge protest rally over events in Northern Ireland is held outside the General Post Office, Dublin. The crowd demands that the Irish Army cross the border.
- 5 August – Belfast experiences the worst sectarian rioting since 1935.
- 12 August – The Troubles: 1969 Northern Ireland riots – Rioting follows an Apprentice Boys of Derry parade. By the evening, a full-scale riot is in progress, later referred to as the Battle of the Bogside.
- 13 August – Battle of the Bogside: As the siege of the Bogside in Derry continues Taoiseach Jack Lynch makes one of the most important speeches ever made on Irish television, saying that the government of the Republic of Ireland "can no longer stand by" and demands a United Nations peace-keeping force for Northern Ireland.
- 14 August – James Chichester-Clark, Prime Minister of Northern Ireland, calls for the mobilisation of British troops on the streets of Northern Ireland: start of Operation Banner.
- 15 August – 1969 Northern Ireland Riots: A night of shooting and burning takes place in Belfast. In Dublin a Sinn Féin protest meeting calls for the boycott of British goods, Irish government protection of the people of Northern Ireland and United Nations intervention.
- 16 August – Operation Banner: British Army soldiers are deployed into particularly violent areas of Belfast.
- 17 August – Members of the Garda Síochána clash with protesters on O'Connell Street, Dublin, as a march against the Northern Ireland situation heads for the British embassy.
- 27 August – The Ulster Special Constabulary (B-Specials) begin to hand in their guns following the decision by Lieutenant-General Freeland to disband them. British Home Secretary James Callaghan visits Belfast.
- August – Andrew Boyd's historical work Holy War in Belfast is published in Tralee; it goes through 6 impressions in 3 years.
- 10 October – The Hunt Committee Report recommends an unarmed civil police force in Northern Ireland.
- 25 November – Electoral Law Act (Northern Ireland) becomes law, granting universal suffrage for adults in local government elections by removing property franchises.
- 27 November – Commissioner for Complaints appointed for local government and public bodies in Northern Ireland.
- December – The Irish Republican Army splits into Official and Provisional wings.
- Goliath crane is completed at the Harland and Wolff shipyard in Belfast.

== Arts and literature ==
- Publication of Padraic Fiacc's own poems, By the Black Stream, and his edited collection of poetry by contemporaries surrounding the topic of The Troubles, The Wearing of the Black.
- Publication of John Hewitt's collection The Day of the Corncrake: Poems of the Nine Glens with paintings by Charles McAuley.
- Publication of Maurice Leitch's novel Poor Lazarus.
- Publication of Michael Longley's poems No Continuing City.
- James Galway begins a 6-year engagement as principal flautist with the Berlin Philharmonic Orchestra.

== Sport ==
=== Football ===
- Irish League

Winners: Linfield

- Irish Cup

Winners: Ards 0 – 0, 4 – 2 Distillery

== Births ==
- 20 January – Ray Close, boxer.
- 14 February – David Holmes, DJ, musician and composer.
- 27 March – Tracey Magee, television presenter and journalist.
- 6 May – Jim Magilton, footballer.
- 24 May – Martin McCague, cricketer.
- 22 August – Kathy Clugston, newsreader.
- 29 August – Joe Swail, snooker player.
- 20 September – Patrick Wallace, snooker player.
- 10 November – Karen Corr, pool and snooker player.
- 11 November – Richard Dormer, actor.
- 12 December – Pearse Jordan, Provisional Irish Republican Army volunteer (killed by RUC 1992).
- 28 December – P. J. Holden, comic artist.

=== Full date unknown ===
- Dudi Appleton, journalist, scriptwriter and film director.
- Adrian Archibald, motorcycle racer.
- Rimi B. Chatterjee, author.
- David Cullen, basketball player.

== Deaths ==
- 25 August – Robert Harcourt, politician (born 1902).
- 4 October – Cathal O'Shannon, politician, trade unionist and journalist (born 1893).
- date unknown (in U.S.) – W. R. Rodgers, poet and writer (born 1909).

== See also ==
- 1969 in Scotland
- 1969 in Wales
