= 1965 in Northern Ireland =

- Centuries: 20th; 21st
- Decades: 1940s; 1950s; 1960s; 1970s; 1980s
- See also: 1965 in the United Kingdom; 1965 in Ireland; Other events of 1965; List of years in Northern Ireland

Events during the year 1965 in Northern Ireland.

== Incumbents ==
- Governor - The Lord Erskine of Rerrick
- Prime Minister - Terence O'Neill

== Events ==
- 14 January – Taoiseach Seán Lemass travels to Belfast for an historic meeting with the Prime Minister of Northern Ireland Terence O'Neill. First meeting of Prime Ministers in 43 years.
- 21 January – Nationalist leader Eddie McAteer visits Taoiseach Seán Lemass in Dublin.
- 18 March – The Northern Ireland Minister for Agriculture, Harry West attends a meeting with his Southern counterpart, Charles Haughey, in Dublin.

== Arts and literature ==
- Publication of Ten Poems by Michael Longley and Twelve Poems by Derek Mahon.

== Sport ==
=== Football ===
- Irish League

Winners: Derry City

- Irish Cup

Winners: Coleraine 2 – 1 Glenavon

== Births ==
=== January to June ===
- 2 January – Brian Irvine, composer.
- 6 January – Esmond Birnie, Ulster Unionist Party former MLA and author.
- 15 January – James Nesbitt, actor.
- 26 January – Seán Savage, member of the Provisional Irish Republican Army
- 20 February – Miriam Mone, fashion designer (died 2007).
- 2 March – Lembit Öpik, UK Liberal Party MP.
- 25 March – Jim Shannon, Democratic Unionist Party MLA.
- 27 April – Edwin Poots, Democratic Unionist Party MLA.
- 3 May – Gary Mitchell, playwright.
- 7 May – Norman Whiteside, footballer.
- 30 May – Briana Corrigan, singer.

=== July to December ===
- 1 July – Jackie McKernan, discus thrower.
- 20 July – Andy Black, poker player.
- 24 July – Frank Mitchell, television presenter.
- 22 September – Andy Cairns, songwriter and musician.
- 10 November – Eddie Irvine, racecar driver.
- 16 December – Noel Magee, boxer.

=== Full date unknown ===
- Mark Carruthers, radio and television journalist.
- Terence McNaughton, hurling player and manager.
- Paul Seawright, artist.

== Deaths ==
- 15 February – Sam Thompson, playwright (born 1916).
- 5 March – Helen Waddell, poet, translator and playwright (born 1889).

== See also ==
- 1965 in Scotland
- 1965 in Wales
