= 1967 in Northern Ireland =

- Centuries: 20th; 21st
- Decades: 1940s; 1950s; 1960s; 1970s; 1980s
- See also: 1967 in the United Kingdom; 1967 in Ireland; Other events of 1967; List of years in Northern Ireland

Events during the year 1967 in Northern Ireland.

== Incumbents ==
- Governor - The Lord Erskine of Rerrick
- Prime Minister - Terence O'Neill

== Events ==
- 29 January - Northern Ireland Civil Rights Association founded in Belfast.
- 6 September - Myrina is launched from the Musgrave Yard slipway at Harland and Wolff in Belfast, the first supertanker and (at around 192000 DWT) largest ship built in the United Kingdom up to this date.
- December - Taoiseach Jack Lynch and Prime Minister of Northern Ireland Terence O'Neill meet for talks at Stormont.

== Arts and literature ==
- The first treasure from the Spanish Armada wreck Girona is recovered.
- The Ulster Architectural Heritage Society is founded under the chairmanship of Charles Brett.

== Sport ==
=== Football ===
- Irish League

Winners: Glentoran

- Irish Cup

Winners: Crusaders 3 - 1 Glentoran

== Births ==
- 9 January - Uel Graham, former cricketer.
- 11 February- Paul McLoone, frontman with The Undertones, voice actor and radio presenter with Today FM.
- 17 February - Gary Fleming, footballer.
- 4 April - David Perry, video game developer.
- 26 April - Robbie Millar, chef and restaurateur (died 2005).
- 24 May - Deirdre Gribbin, composer.
- 2 June - Alan Rutherford, cricketer.
- 12 July - Sean Connor, footballer and manager.
- 1 October - Geraldine Heaney, defenceman (ice hockey) and head coach.
- 22 October - Dawn Purvis, leader of the Progressive Unionist Party and MLA.
- 24 October - Terence Bannon, mountaineer.
- November - Mairtín Crawford, poet and journalist (died 2004).
- 27 November - Andrea Catherwood, television news presenter.
- 14 December - George O'Boyle, footballer.
- Full date unknown - Paul Kearney, author.

== Deaths ==
- 28 February - Dick Keith, footballer (born 1933).
- 12 April - Sam English, footballer (born 1908).

== See also ==
- 1967 in Scotland
- 1967 in Wales
