= 1966 in Northern Ireland =

- Centuries: 20th; 21st
- Decades: 1940s; 1950s; 1960s; 1970s; 1980s
- See also: 1966 in the United Kingdom; 1966 in Ireland; Other events of 1966; List of years in Northern Ireland

Events during the year 1966 in Northern Ireland.

== Incumbents ==
- Governor - The Lord Erskine of Rerrick
- Prime Minister - Terence O'Neill

== Events ==
- 1 January - Start of The Troubles as retrospectively defined by the UK Northern Ireland Troubles (Legacy and Reconciliation) Act 2023 for the purposes of the act.
- 17 April - In Belfast, the Easter Rising is commemorated by large republican parades.
- 26 June - Ulster Volunteer Force engages in three sectarian murders.
- 23 November - By-election for the Parliament of Northern Ireland in the Queen's University of Belfast constituency, the last election prior to the seat's abolition in 1969. Robert Porter (Ulster Unionist Party) wins.
- Divis Tower in Belfast is built.

== Arts and literature ==
- Seamus Heaney's first poetry collection, Death of a Naturalist.
- Ulster Orchestra founded in Belfast by the Arts Council of Northern Ireland, with Maurice Miles as its first principal conductor and János Fürst as leader.

== Sport ==
=== Football ===
- Irish League

Winners: Linfield

- Irish Cup

Winners: Glentoran 2 - 0 Linfield

== Births ==
- 3 January - Martin Galway, composer for games.
- 24 January - Jimeoin, comedian and actor.
- 8 March - Enda Gormley, Gaelic footballer.
- 25 March - Anton Rogan, footballer.
- 16 August - Barry McElduff, Sinn Féin MLA.
- 30 August - Peter Cunnah, singer and songwriter.
- 12 October - Brian Kennedy, singer, Eurovision song contestant and writer.
- 28 October - Jules Maxwell, songwriter and composer.
- 16 November - Paul Millar, footballer and football manager.
- 12 December - Ian Paisley Jr, Democratic Unionist Party MLA.
- 20 December - Dekker Curry, cricketer.
- 27 December - Henry Downey, Derry GAA hurler and Gaelic footballer.
- John McCrea, comic artist.
- Cathy Wilkes, multimedia artist.

== Deaths ==
- 28 March - Patrick McCartan, Sinn Féin MP and TD, member of First Dáil, a founder member of Clann na Poblachta (born 1878).
- 1 April - Brian O'Nolan, novelist, satirist and humorist (born 1911).
- 15 July - Sydney Sparkes Orr, Professor of Philosophy at the University of Tasmania (born 1914).

== See also ==
- 1966 in Scotland
- 1966 in Wales
