= 1958 in Northern Ireland =

- Centuries: 20th; 21st
- Decades: 1930s; 1940s; 1950s; 1960s; 1970s
- See also: 1958 in the United Kingdom; 1958 in Ireland; Other events of 1958; List of years in Northern Ireland

Events during the year 1958 in Northern Ireland.

== Incumbents ==
- Governor - The Lord Wakehurst
- Prime Minister - Basil Brooke

== Events ==
- 6 February – Jackie Blanchflower, capped 12 times for the Northern Ireland national football team, survives the Munich air disaster involving Manchester United on the return flight from a European Cup tie in Yugoslavia. Jackie (younger brother of Tottenham Hotspur's Danny Blanchflower) has won two league champions in England with United since his debut for them in 1951, but his injuries are severe and he is forced to abandon the game in the coming year.
- 18 March – Taoiseach Éamon de Valera says he would be willing to have talks with the government of Northern Ireland on wider economic co-operation.
- 18 August – Regional postage stamps of Great Britain are first issued.
- 25 October – Northern Ireland-built Short SC.1 experimental VTOL aircraft makes its first free vertical flight.

== Arts and literature ==
- 1 July – Release of the film A Night to Remember (about the sinking of the Titanic) produced by William MacQuitty.

== Sport ==
=== Football ===
- FIFA World Cup
  - Group stage
    - Northern Ireland 1-1 Czechoslovakia
    - Northern Ireland 1-1 Argentina
    - Northern Ireland 1-1 West Germany
  - Group play-off stage
    - Northern Ireland 2-1 Czechoslovakia AET
  - Quarter final stage
    - Northern Ireland 0-4 France Northern Ireland knocked out
- Irish League
  - Winners: Ards
- Irish Cup
  - Winners: Ballymena United 2 - 0 Linfield

== Births ==
- 21 February – Jake Burns, punk rock singer and guitarist.
- 14 March – Davy Francis, cartoonist.
- 25 March – Margaret Ritchie, SDLP MLA.
- 2 May – Jim Harvey, footballer and manager.
- 1 August – Adrian Dunbar, actor and screenwriter.
- 13 August – Feargal Sharkey, lead singer of The Undertones.
- 16 August – Diane Dodds, DUP MLA, MEP.
- 20 August – Nigel Dodds, DUP MP, MLA.
- 20 October – Dave Finlay, professional wrestler.
- 4 November – Pat Ramsey, SDLP MLA, Mayor of Derry.
- November – Bernadette Sands McKevitt, co-founder of the 32 County Sovereignty Movement.
- Brendan Cleary, poet.
- John Farry, singer-songwriter.
- Jim Gray, UDA leader in East Belfast and publican (killed 2005).
- Andre Stitt, performance artist.

== Deaths ==
- 24 August – Paul Henry, artist (born 1876).
- 2 December – Alan McKibbin, businessman and Ulster Unionist Party MP (born 1892).

== See also ==
- 1958 in Scotland
- 1958 in Wales
