= 1963 in Northern Ireland =

- Centuries: 20th; 21st
- Decades: 1940s; 1950s; 1960s; 1970s; 1980s
- See also: 1963 in the United Kingdom; 1963 in Ireland; Other events of 1963; List of years in Northern Ireland

Events during the year 1963 in Northern Ireland.

== Incumbents ==
- Governor - The Lord Wakehurst
- Prime Minister - Basil Brooke (until 25 March), Terence O'Neill (from 25 March)

== Events ==
- 17 January – Prototype Short SC.7 Skyvan short-haul freighter first flies.
- 25 March – Terence O'Neill succeeds Viscount Brookeborough as Prime Minister of Northern Ireland.
- 23 September – British Enkalon synthetic fibre factory opens in Antrim.
- 2 October – Second Short SC.1 VTOL research aircraft (XG905), flying from Belfast Harbour Airport, crashes due to a control malfunction, killing the pilot, J. R. Green.
- 28 October – Belfast Aldergrove opened as the principal airport for Northern Ireland, civilian facilities transferring from Nutts Corner.

== Sport ==
=== Football ===
- Irish League

Winners: Distillery

- Irish Cup

Winners: Linfield 2 – 1 Distillery

=== Golf ===
- British Ladies Amateur Golf Championship is held at Royal County Down Golf Club, (winner: Brigitte Varangot).

== Births ==
- 10 July – Conor Murphy, Sinn Féin MP and MLA.
- 30 July – Thomas Buchanan, Democratic Unionist Party MLA.
- 9 August – Sam Storey, boxer.
- 25 August – Candida Doyle, keyboard player.
- 12 October – Alan McDonald, footballer and football manager.
- 27 October – Johnny Adair, loyalist paramilitary.
- 11 December
  - Tom Elliott, Ulster Unionist Party MLA.
  - David Hilditch – Democratic Unionist Party MLA.
- 15 December – Christopher "Crip" McWilliams, Chief of Staff of the Irish National Liberation Army.
- Richard English, historian.
- Siobhán O'Hanlon, Sinn Féin official (died 2006).

== Deaths ==
- 22 November – C. S. Lewis, novelist and author of The Chronicles of Narnia (born 1898).
- 30 November – Dehra Parker, longest serving woman MP in Northern Ireland and first woman to serve in the Northern Ireland Cabinet.
- December – Andy Kennedy, footballer (born 1897).

== See also ==
- 1963 in Scotland
- 1963 in Wales
