= 1964 in Northern Ireland =

- Centuries: 20th; 21st
- Decades: 1940s; 1950s; 1960s; 1970s; 1980s
- See also: 1964 in the United Kingdom; 1964 in Ireland; Other events of 1964; List of years in Northern Ireland

Events during the year 1964 in Northern Ireland.

== Incumbents ==
- Governor - The Lord Wakehurst (until 1 December), The Lord Erskine of Rerrick (from 1 December)
- Prime Minister - Terence O'Neill

== Events ==
- 28 January - Families from Springtown Camp make a silent march through Derry to demand rehousing.
- 28 September - Following threats of direct action by Ian Paisley, the Royal Ulster Constabulary remove an Irish tricolour displayed in the office window of Independent Republican election candidate Billy McMillen in West Belfast. Several days of rioting ensue.
- 15 October - 1964 United Kingdom general election.
- New bridge over the River Foyle, linking Lifford and Strabane is built.

== Arts and literature ==
- 17 April - The band Them, fronted by Van Morrison, play their first gig at his rhythm and blues Club Rado at the Maritime Hotel, Belfast.
- Synagogue for Belfast Hebrew Congregation designed by Eugene Rosenberg of Yorke, Rosenberg and Mardall.
- Extension to the Ulster Museum, Belfast, designed in Brutalist style by Francis Pym, completed.

== Sport ==
=== Football ===
- Irish League

Winners: Glentoran

- Irish Cup

Winners: Derry City 2 - 0 Glentoran

- Armagh City F.C. founded as Milford Everton.

=== Olympics ===
- Robin Dixon, 3rd Baron Glentoran wins the Gold medal for the two-man bobsleigh with Tony Nash at the 1964 Winter Olympics at Innsbruck.

== Births ==
- 18 January - Richard Dunwoody, jockey.
- 24 February - Robert McLiam Wilson, novelist.
- 26 March - Martin Donnelly, motor racing driver.
- 29 August - Dara O'Hagan, Sinn Féin MLA and councillor.
- 15 September - Alan Jones, architect.
- 1 November - Terry Magee, boxer.
- 8 December - Charles McCrum, cricketer.
- 26 December - Ian Wilson, composer.
- Full date unknown - John Long, painter.

== See also ==
- 1964 in Scotland
- 1964 in Wales
