= 1962 in Northern Ireland =

- Centuries: 20th; 21st
- Decades: 1940s; 1950s; 1960s; 1970s; 1980s
- See also: 1962 in the United Kingdom; 1962 in Ireland; Other events of 1962; List of years in Northern Ireland

Events during the year 1962 in Northern Ireland.

== Incumbents ==
- Governor - The Lord Wakehurst
- Prime Minister - Basil Brooke

== Events ==
- 26 February – The Irish Republican Army officially calls off its Border Campaign.
- 1 April – Belfast Zoo (Bellevue Gardens) is transferred from Belfast Corporation's Transport Department to the Parks & Cemeteries Department to halt its further decline.
- 31 May - The Northern Ireland general election again produces a large majority for the Ulster Unionist Party, winning 34 out of 51 seats, though the Nationalist Party gains two seats for a total of 9.
- 21 August – Former US President Dwight D. Eisenhower arrives in Belfast on a four-day visit to Ireland.
- Ulster Hospital for Women and Sick Children is relocated from Belfast to Dundonald and renamed the Ulster Hospital.
- Denis Barritt and Charles Carter's The Northern Ireland Problem: a study in group relations is published by Oxford University Press.

== Arts and literature ==
- Belfast Festival at Queen's founded by student Michael Emmerson.
- Belfast Municipal Museum and Art Gallery renamed as the Ulster Museum and recognised as a national museum. A major extension, designed in Brutalist style by Francis Pym, is begun.

== Sport ==
=== Football ===
- Irish League

Winners: Linfield

- Irish Cup

Winners: Linfield 4 – 0 Portadown

== Births ==
- 2 January – Niall Patterson, Antrim hurler.
- 22 January – Michael Alcorn, composer.
- 6 February – Tony Scullion, Derry GAA hurler and Gaelic footballer.
- 23 January – Letitia Gwynne, television presenter and journalist.
- 28 May – Andy White, singer-songwriter.
- 13 June – Colin Bateman, novelist and screenwriter.
- 16 June – Steve Aiken, Ulster Unionist leader.
- 3 July – Roy Beggs Jr, Ulster Unionist MLA.
- 6 July – Fearghal McKinney, television presenter and journalist.
- 19 July – Caitríona Ruane, Sinn Féin MLA and Minister for Education.
- 11 August – Paul McCrum, cricketer.
- 25 August – Vivian Campbell, rock guitarist.
- 28 October – Peter McDonald, poet and critic.
- 30 October – Colin Clarke, footballer and football manager.
- 7 December – Jeffrey Donaldson, Democratic Unionist Party MP for Lagan Valley.
- Full date unknown – Anna Burns, novelist.

== Deaths ==
- Anne Acheson, sculptor (born 1882)

== See also ==
- 1962 in Scotland
- 1962 in Wales
