= 1965 in Ireland =

- Centuries: 18th; 19th; 20th; 21st
- Decades: 1940s; 1950s; 1960s; 1970s; 1980s
- See also: 1965 in Northern Ireland; Other events of 1965; List of years in Ireland

Events in the year 1965 in Ireland.

== Incumbents ==
- President: Éamon de Valera
- Taoiseach: Seán Lemass (FF)
- Tánaiste:
  - Seán MacEntee (FF) (until 21 April 1965)
  - Frank Aiken (FF) (from 21 April 1965)
- Minister for Finance:
  - James Ryan (FF) (until 21 April 1965)
  - Jack Lynch (FF) (from 21 April 1965)
- Chief Justice: Cearbhall Ó Dálaigh
- Dáil:
  - 17th (until 11 March 1965)
  - 18th (from 21 April 1965)
- Seanad:
  - 10th (until 28 April 1965)
  - 11th (from 23 June 1965)

== Events ==
- 14 January – Taoiseach Seán Lemass travelled to Belfast for a historic meeting with the Prime Minister of Northern Ireland Terence O'Neill.
- 21 January – Nationalist leader Eddie McAteer visited Seán Lemass in Dublin.
- 28 February – Roger Casement (executed in Pentonville Prison in 1916) was honoured with a state funeral and reburial in Glasnevin Cemetery in Dublin.
- 7 March – Changes to the Liturgy of the Catholic Mass were introduced. Mass was said in the vernacular (English) for the first time instead of in Latin.
- 18 March – The Northern Minister for Agriculture, Harry West attended a meeting with his Southern counterpart, Charles Haughey, in Dublin.
- 20 March – Ireland made its debut at the Eurovision Song Contest. Butch Moore sang Walking the Streets in the Rain and came sixth at the final in Naples.
- 7 April – 1965 Irish general election: The ruling Fianna Fáil party led by Seán Lemass gained a majority. This was the first Irish general election to be covered on television by state broadcaster Telefís Éireann. The Clann na Talmhan party did not contest the election and was wound up. Members of the 18th Dáil assembled on 21 April.
- 18 April – The Gaelic Athletic Association Congress in Dublin decided that the ban on foreign games was to remain.
- 21 April – James Dillon resigned as leader of the Fine Gael party following his election defeat. Liam Cosgrave was the new leader.
- 24 May – The first drive-on car ferry service between Rosslare Harbour in County Wexford and Fishguard in Wales officially opened.
- 13 June – Huge crowds turned out at Drumcliff Churchyard in County Sligo to honour the poet W. B. Yeats on the centenary of his birth.
- 8 July – Taoiseach Seán Lemass was conferred with an honorary Doctorate of Law at Trinity College Dublin.
- 26 July – Craigavon was designated as a New Town under the New Towns Act (Northern Ireland).
- July–September – Newspaper strike in Dublin
- 15 August – Galway Cathedral was dedicated.

== Arts and literature ==
- Dominic Behan's biography My Brother Brendan was published.
- John McGahern's novel The Dark was published.
- Iris Murdoch's novel The Red and the Green, with an Easter Rising setting, was published.
- Dervla Murphy's first travel book, Full Tilt: Ireland to India with a Bicycle, was published.

== Science and technology ==
- The Young Scientist Exhibition was held for the first time.

== Births ==
- 18 January – Paudge Behan, actor
- 22 January – Denis Walsh, Cork Gaelic footballer and hurler.
- 22 February – Kieren Fallon, champion flat racing jockey.
- 28 February – Colum McCann, fiction writer.
- 10 March – Damien Hancock, association football referee.
- 17 March – Joe Cooney, Galway hurler.
- 24 March – John Commins, Galway hurler.
- 26 March – John McDonnell, association football player and manager.
- 30 April – Eddie McGoldrick, association football player born in England of Irish descent.
- 14 May – Eoin Colfer, author.
- 28 May – Mary Coughlan, Tánaiste and Fianna Fáil party Teachta Dála (TD) for Donegal South-West.
- 22 June – Enda McCallion, film director.
- June – Jim Cashman, Cork hurler.
- 1 July – Teddy McCarthy, Cork Gaelic footballer and hurler.
- 10 July – Dominic Hannigan, politician
- 30 July – Declan Carr, Tipperary hurler.
- 2 October – Keith Ridgway, writer.
- 8 October – Ardal O'Hanlon, comedian, actor and writer.
- 31 October – Denis Irwin, association football player.
- 10 November – Sean Hughes, comedian born in England of Irish parents (died 2017).
- 20 November – Diarmuid Wilson, Fianna Fáil party senator.
- 25 November – David Kelly, association footballer born in England of Irish descent.

=== Full date unknown ===
- Mike McCormack, novelist.
- Gary Coyle, artist.

== Deaths ==
- 7 January – Jimmy O'Dea, comedian (born 1899).
- 6 February – Tom Jameson, cricketer (born 1892).
- 10 February – Jim Hurley, veteran of the Irish War of Independence, Cork Gaelic footballer and hurler (born 1902).
- 15 February
  - Bill Britton, athlete (born 1890).
  - Sam Thompson, playwright (born 1916).
- 13 March – Patrick Giles, Fine Gael TD (born 1899).
- 10 April – James Duhig, Archbishop of Roman Catholic Archdiocese of Brisbane (born 1873).
- 12 June – Arthur Cox, solicitor, priest, nominated to 8th Seanad by the Taoiseach in 1954.
- 22 June – Piaras Béaslaí, member of the Irish Republican Brotherhood, member of Dáil Éireann, author, playwright, biographer and translator (born 1881).
- 4 July – Edward Sackville-West, 5th Baron Sackville, music critic (born 1901 in England)
- 17 July – Frank Ryan, tenor (born 1900).
- 28 August – Richard Wyndham-Quin, 6th Earl of Dunraven, peer (born 1887).
- 11 September – Bethel Solomons, obstetrician and rugby player (born 1885).
- 26 September – James Fitzmaurice, pilot, aviation pioneer (born 1898).
- 12 November – Charles McCausland, cricketer (born 1898).
- 16 November – W. T. Cosgrave, first President of the Executive Council of the Irish Free State (born 1880).
- 27 November – Francis MacManus, novelist (born 1909).
- 30 December – Henry George Farmer, musicologist (born 1882).

== See also ==
- 1965 in Irish television
