= 1959 in Northern Ireland =

- Centuries: 20th; 21st
- Decades: 1930s; 1940s; 1950s; 1960s; 1970s
- See also: 1959 in the United Kingdom; 1959 in Ireland; Other events of 1959; List of years in Northern Ireland

Events during the year 1959 in Northern Ireland.

== Incumbents ==
- Governor – The Lord Wakehurst
- Prime Minister – Basil Brooke

== Events ==
- 10 February – Unions vote to end the 15-year split in the Irish trade union movement. The Irish Congress of Trade Unions results from the merger of the TUC and the CIU.
- 22 September – At its inaugural conference the Irish Congress of Trade Unions attacks the government of Northern Ireland for not recognising the new organisation.
- Manufacture of Spot-On models (1:42 scale die-cast model cars) by Lines Bros at Castlereagh in Belfast begins.

== Arts and literature ==
- 31 October – Ulster Television, the ITV franchise for Northern Ireland, goes on air.

== Sport ==
=== Football ===
- Irish League

Winners: Linfield

- Irish Cup

Winners: Glenavon 1–1, 2–0 Ballymena United

== Births ==
=== January to June ===
- 25 February – Stephen Moutray, Democratic Unionist Party MLA.
- 31 March – Ali McMordie, punk rock bass guitarist.
- 26 April – Alex Attwood, SDLP MLA.
- 12 May – Mark Robinson, Democratic Unionist Party MLA.
- 20 May – Gregory Gray, born Paul Lerwill, singer-songwriter (died 2019).

=== July to December ===
- 6 July – Danny Kennedy, Ulster Unionist Party MLA.
- 11 July – Stephen Warke, cricketer.
- 3 September
  - Dolores Kelly, SDLP MLA.
  - Dick Strawbridge, engineer and television presenter.
- 17 September – Charles Lawson, actor.
- 11 October – David Morgan, television presenter and journalist (died 2016).
- 13 November
  - Trevor Ringland, Irish rugby international.
  - Davy Tweed, Irish rugby international, unionist councillor (died 2021).
- 17 November – Kate Thompson, actress and romantic novelist.
- 18 November – Jimmy Quinn, footballer and football manager.
- 3 December – Eamonn Holmes, television and radio presenter.
- 9 December – Paul Jackson, cricketer.
- 15 December – Hugh Russell, boxer (died 2023).

=== Full date unknown ===
- Willie Doherty, installation and video artist.

== Deaths ==
- January – William Forbes Marshall, Presbyterian minister and poet (born 1888).
- 4 February – Una O'Connor, actress (born 1880).
- 16 May – Elisha Scott, footballer (born 1894).
- 13 June – Seán Lester, diplomat and last Secretary General of the League of Nations (born 1888).

== See also ==
- 1959 in Scotland
- 1959 in Wales
