= 1961 in Northern Ireland =

- Centuries: 20th; 21st
- Decades: 1940s; 1950s; 1960s; 1970s; 1980s
- See also: 1961 in the United Kingdom; 1961 in Ireland; Other events of 1961; List of years in Northern Ireland

Events during the year 1961 in Northern Ireland.

== Incumbents ==
- Governor - The Lord Wakehurst
- Prime Minister - Basil Brooke

== Events ==
- 4 March - INS Vikrant is commissioned as the Indian Navy's first aircraft carrier in Belfast, having been completed here by Harland & Wolff.
- May - The last passenger liner completed by Harland & Wolff in Belfast, SS Canberra, is delivered to P&O.
- 6 May - Northern Ireland international wing-half Danny Blanchflower captains Tottenham Hotspur F.C. to the double of the Football League First Division title and FA Cup in England - the first team in 64 years to achieve this feat.
- 8 August - Queen Elizabeth II and her husband Prince Philip arrive at Carrickfergus on HMY Britannia to begin a 2-day royal visit to Northern Ireland.
- 20 December - The last legal execution in Ireland occurs in Belfast - it is of Robert McGladdery for murder.

== Sport ==
=== Football ===
- Irish League

Winners: Linfield

- Irish Cup

Winners: Glenavon 5 - 1 Linfield

== Births ==
- 15 January - Damian O'Neill, guitarist.
- 6 June - Bob Gilmore, musicologist and musician.
- 15 June - Dave McAuley, boxer.
- 10 September - Ian Stewart, footballer.
- 4 November - Nigel Worthington, footballer, football manager and manager of Northern Ireland national football team.
- 26 December - John Lynch, actor.
- Maureen Boyle, poet.
- Peter Curran, broadcaster.
- Owen McCafferty, playwright.
- Eoin McNamee, novelist and screenwriter.
- Marcas Ó Murchú, traditional flute player.
- Glenn Patterson, writer.

== Deaths ==
- 18 January - Joseph Connolly, Fianna Fáil politician (born 1885).
- 25 September - James Crichton, soldier, recipient of the Victoria Cross for gallantry in 1918 at Crèvecœur, France (born 1879).
- 8 December - Seamus Robinson, member of Irish Volunteers and Irish Republican Army (born 1890).
- 20 December - Robert McGladdery, murderer and last person to be executed in Northern Ireland.

== See also ==
- 1961 in Scotland
- 1961 in Wales
