= 1958 in Ireland =

- Centuries: 18th; 19th; 20th; 21st
- Decades: 1930s; 1940s; 1950s; 1960s; 1970s
- See also: 1958 in Northern Ireland; Other events of 1958; List of years in Ireland

Events from the year 1958 in Ireland.

== Incumbents ==
- President: Seán T. O'Kelly
- Taoiseach: Éamon de Valera (FF)
- Tánaiste: Seán Lemass (FF)
- Minister for Finance: James Ryan (FF)
- Chief Justice: Conor Maguire
- Dáil: 16th
- Seanad: 9th

== Events ==
- 6 February – Association football player, 22-year-old Billy Whelan, who played four times for the Irish national team, was among 21 people killed in the Munich air disaster involving English football team Manchester United.
- 18 March – Taoiseach Éamon de Valera said he would be willing to have talks with the government of Northern Ireland on wider economic co-operation.
- 20 March – Work began on the £80,000 restoration of the State Rooms at Dublin Castle.
- 10 May – The Independent Teachta Dála (TD), Jack Murphy, resigned in protest at the indifference of the main political parties to the plight of the unemployed.
- 12 May – The Ardmore Film Studios were opened by the Tánaiste, Seán Lemass.
- 22 May – The Minister for Education, Jack Lynch, told the Dáil that the ruling requiring women teachers to retire upon marriage was to be revoked.
- 23 May – The Agricultural Institute (An Foras Talúntais) was established. Its functions would later be taken over by Teagasc in 1988
- 25 July – £100 damages were awarded to a nine-year-old boy who was beaten by his teacher in a national school.
- 28 July – The Carlisle Monument, an eight-foot bronze statue in the Phoenix Park in Dublin, was blown up by an Irish republican bomb in the early hours.
- 8 August – The United States Embassy in Merrion Square, Dublin displayed plans for a new embassy.
- 8 September – Pan Am's Boeing 707 became the first jetliner to touch down on European soil at Shannon Airport.
- 1 October – Assets and management of the Great Northern Railway were divided between Córas Iompair Éireann and the Ulster Transport Authority.
- 29 October – The Government announced that the question of ending the proportional representation method of voting was to be put to the people in a referendum.
- 4 November – In the Vatican, Taoiseach Éamon de Valera attended the four-hour coronation of Pope John XXIII.
- 31 December – The Harcourt Street railway line in Dublin closed, having served Ranelagh, Milltown, Dundrum, Stillorgan, Foxrock, Carrickmines, Shankill and Bray.

== Arts and literature ==
- 21 February – Desmond Guinness established the Irish Georgian Society for the promotion of Georgian architecture.
- June – The first branch of record shop Dolphin Discs was opened in the Dolphin's Barn suburb of Dublin.
- 16 June – Brendan Behan's one-act Irish language play An Giall was first performed at the Damer Theatre in Dublin.
- 14 October – The English adaptation of An Giall, (The Hostage), was first performed by Joan Littlewood's Theatre Workshop at the Theatre Royal Stratford East, London.
- 28 October – Samuel Beckett's monologue Krapp's Last Tape was first performed by Patrick Magee at the Royal Court Theatre, London.
- Samuel Beckett's novel The Unnamable was published in English.
- Brendan Behan's autobiographical Borstal Boy was published in London. On 12 November it was banned in Ireland by the Censorship of Publications Board.
- Thomas Kinsella's poetry Another September was published in Dublin.
- Patrick MacDonogh's poetry One Landscape Still was published.
- John Montague's poetry Forms of Exile was published.
- The Oxford Book of Irish Verse, XVIIth century-XXth century, edited by Donagh MacDonagh and Lennox Robinson, was published.

== Sports ==
=== Association football ===
- Football World Cup

(The Republic of Ireland did not qualify for the 1958 world cup)

Northern Ireland:

  - Group stage
    - Northern Ireland 1–1 Czechoslovakia
    - Northern Ireland 1–1 Argentina
    - Northern Ireland 1–1 West Germany
      - Northern Ireland entered group playoff stage
    - Northern Ireland 2–1 Czechoslovakia AET
      - Northern Ireland qualified for the quarterfinal stage
    - Northern Ireland 0–4 France
      - Northern Ireland were knocked out at the quarterfinal stage

== Births ==
- 1 January – Liam Fennelly, Kilkenny hurler
- 27 January – Synan Braddish, association football player
- 1 February – Seán Fleming, Fianna Fáil Teachta Dála (TD) for Laois–Offaly
- 2 February – Paddy Prendergast, Kilkenny hurler
- 16 February – Fintan O'Toole, journalist and drama critic
- 1 April – Stephen O'Rahilly, Irish-British physician and academic
- 19 April – Denis O'Brien, entrepreneur
- 30 April – James Hewitt, soldier and lover of Diana, Princess of Wales
- 6 May
  - Tommy Byrne, motor racing driver
  - Ivor Callely, Fianna Fáil politician, member of the 23rd Seanad, TD and Minister of State
- 8 May – Roddy Doyle, novelist, dramatist and screenwriter
- 11 May – Conor Hayes, Galway hurler and manager
- 2 June – John Buckley, Cork hurler
- 7 June – Aidan Fogarty, Offaly hurler
- 8 June
  - Louise Richardson, political scientist and university vice-chancellor
  - Niall Williams, writer
- 5 July – Veronica Guerin, journalist (murdered by drug dealers in 1996)
- 10 July – Fiona Shaw, actress
- 11 July – Martin Doherty, member of the Provisional Irish Republican Army
- 16 July – Michael Flatley, American dancer
- 10 September – Siobhan Fahey, musician
- 16 September – Maura O'Connell, singer
- 18 September – John Aldridge, Irish international association football player, in England of Irish descent
- 11 November – John Devine, association football player
- 21 November – Eddie O'Sullivan, head coach of the Ireland national rugby union team

Full date unknown
- Noel Hill, concertina player
- Glenn Meade, fiction writer

== Deaths ==
- 1 January – Richard Hayes, doctor and Sinn Féin Member of Parliament (born 1878)
- 17 January – Michael Donohoe, Irish-born American politician, Democratic U.S. Representative from Pennsylvania (born 1864)
- 24 March – Seumas O'Sullivan, poet and editor (born 1879)
- 29 March – Jimmy Archer, Major League baseball player (born 1883)
- 24 April – Mabel McConnell Fitzgerald, republican, suffragette and socialist (born 1884]
- 6 July – John Esmonde, soldier, Fine Gael TD (born 1893)
- 28 July – Dick Walsh, Kilkenny hurler (born 1878)
- 13 August – James Lennon, member of First Dáil representing County Carlow
- 24 August – Paul Henry, artist (born 1876)
- 9 September – Máire Nic Shiubhlaigh, actress and Republican activist (born 1883)
- 15 October – Lennox Robinson, dramatist, poet and theatre director and producer (born 1886)
- 2 December – Alan McKibbin, businessman and Ulster Unionist Party MP (born 1892)
- 8 December – Peig Sayers (Máiréad Ó Gaoithín), seanachaí (traditional storyteller) (born 1873)
- 19 December – Arthur Gore, 6th Earl of Arran, Anglo-Irish peer and soldier (born 1868)
- 23 December – Dorothy Macardle, author and historian (born 1889)
- 24 December – Martin O'Brien, hurler (Thurles Sarsfields, Tipperary) (born 1885)
