= 1966 in Ireland =

- Centuries: 18th; 19th; 20th; 21st
- Decades: 1940s; 1950s; 1960s; 1970s; 1980s
- See also: 1966 in Northern Ireland; Other events of 1966; List of years in Ireland

Events in the year 1966 in Ireland.

== Incumbents ==
- President: Éamon de Valera
- Taoiseach:
  - Seán Lemass (FF) (until 10 November 1966)
  - Jack Lynch (FF) (from 10 November 1966)
- Tánaiste: Frank Aiken (FF)
- Minister for Finance:
  - Jack Lynch (FF) (until 10 November 1966)
  - Charles Haughey (FF) (from 10 November 1966)
- Chief Justice: Cearbhall Ó Dálaigh
- Dáil: 18th
- Seanad: 11th

== Events ==
=== February ===
- 13 February – The Bishop of Clonfert, Thomas Ryan, protested against the content of The Late Late Show because an audience member, Eileen Fox, told host Gay Byrne that she wore no nightie on her wedding night. The episode was broadly referred to thereafter in Ireland as the Bishop and the Nightie scandal.

=== March ===
- 6 March – A memorial was opened at Kilmichael, County Cork, to commemorate the 1920 ambush there.
- 8 March
  - Nelson's Pillar in O'Connell Street in Dublin was blown up, probably by former Irish Republican Army volunteers marking this year's 50th anniversary of the Easter Rising.
  - A teenage riot took place in the early hours at Dublin Airport when singer Dickie Rock returned from his joint-fourth-place rank at the Eurovision song contest in Luxembourg. Gardaí linked arms and struggled to contain the surging mob of 1,000 over-excited young people, twenty of whom were taken to hospital.
  - The Broadcasting Authority (Amendment) Act changed the name of the national broadcasting authority from Radio Éireann to Radio Telefís Éireann.
- 18 March – The Dublin and Dún Laoghaire Traffic (One-Way Streets) Temporary Rules, 1966 (S.I. No. 51/1966) statute came into effect, which introduced one-way traffic on numerous streets across Dublin and Dún Laoghaire.
- 31 March – The tricolour flag flown over the General Post Office in Dublin in 1916 was returned by the British to the taoiseach, Seán Lemass, in London.

=== April ===
- 6 April – The re-established Ulster Volunteer Force launched its campaign in Belfast.
- 10 April – Celebrations took place to mark the 50th anniversary of the Easter Rising in 1916. Nine hundred survivors of the rising heard the reading of the Proclamation of the Irish Republic and President Éamon de Valera took the salute at a military parade.
- 11 April – President De Valera opened the Garden of Remembrance in Parnell Square in Dublin.
- 15 April – Construction of Ireland's first high-rise flats began in Ballymun, Dublin.
- 17 April – The Easter Rising was commemorated in Belfast by large Republican parades.

=== June ===
- 1 June – In the 1966 presidential election, the Fianna Fáil party candidate Éamon de Valera was elected to a second term in office when he beat Fine Gael party candidate Tom O'Higgins by 10,500 votes, less than one percent of the ballot (0.97%). De Valera was inaugurated on June 25.

=== July ===
- July 25 – US congressman Richard Nixon visited Dublin in connection with the establishment of a petrochemical company near the Nitrigin Éireann Teoranta fertiliser factory in Arklow, County Wicklow. He met the taoiseach, Seán Lemass and visited President de Valera at Áras an Uachtaráin.

=== September ===
- 7 September – At a National Union of Journalists seminar, the new Minister for Education, Donogh O'Malley, announced plans for his revolutionary free secondary education scheme, along with a free school-transport scheme for rural children. These plans were implemented in September 1967.
- 21 September – Allied Irish Banks was founded by the amalgamation of the Munster and Leinster Bank, Provincial Bank of Ireland, and Royal Bank of Ireland.

=== October ===
- 21 October – An anti-apartheid demonstration took place outside the National Stadium during a visit by the South African Amateur Boxing Team.

=== November ===
- 8 November – Tributes were paid to Seán Lemass who announced his resignation as Taoiseach.
- 10 November – The new taoiseach, Jack Lynch, and his ministers received their seals of office from President de Valera at the president's residence, Áras an Uachtaráin.
- 25 November – The body of the second President of Ireland, Seán T. O'Kelly, lay in state at St. Mary's Pro-Cathedral.

=== December ===
- 1 December – Stillorgan Shopping Centre, the first shopping centre in Ireland, was opened by the recently retired taoiseach, Seán Lemass.

=== Undated ===
- The nave at Ballintubber Abbey was restored and re-roofed.
- Tayto launched its second crisp flavour: salt and vinegar.
- First Quinnsworth branch opens.

== Arts and literature ==
- 28 February – The first English-language production of Samuel Beckett's Come and Go took place at the Peacock Theatre, Dublin. It was first produced on 14 January in German, in Berlin; it was also first published, in French, this year.
- 18 July – The new Abbey Theatre in Dublin opened exactly 15 years after the original was burned down; the architect was former actor Michael Scott.
- October – The first annual Castlebar Song Contest was staged in County Mayo.
- Seamus Heaney's first poetry collection, Death of a Naturalist, was published.
- Aidan Higgins's novel Langrishe, Go Down was published.

== Births ==
- 24 January – Jimeoin, comedian, actor, producer and screenwriter.
- 25 January – Donal MacIntyre, investigative journalist.
- 8 February – Seán McCarthy, Cork hurler.
- 14 February – Gary Halpin, international rugby union player (died 2021).
- 17 February – John Power, Kilkenny hurler.
- 12 April – Jim Duffy, historian and political commentator.
- 23 April – Jim Stynes, Australian rules football player (died 2012).
- 3 May – Ducksy Walsh, handball player (died 2016).
- 15 May – Orla Guerin, television journalist.
- 22 May – Colm Ó Snodaigh, singer and musician with Kíla, and writer.
- 9 June – Beverley Flynn, Fianna Fáil Teachta Dála (TD) for Mayo.
- 2 August – Grainne Leahy, Irish cricketer.
- 22 August – Alain Rolland, rugby player, international referee.
- 6 October – Niall Quinn, association footballer.
- 8 October – Mick Galwey, Gaelic footballer and rugby player.
- November – David Drumm, banker and convicted fraudster.
- 11 November – Alison Doody, actress.
- 21 November – Martin Hanamy, Offaly hurler.
- 30 November – Lenny Abrahamson, film director.
- 7 December – Leo Turley, Laois Gaelic footballer.
- 8 December – Sinéad O'Connor, singer-songwriter (died 2023).
- 10 December – Colm Ó Maonlaí, actor and musician.
- 12 December – Pat Shortt, actor.
- 16 December – Paul McGinley, golfer.

Full date unknown
- Rachel Joynt, sculptor.
- Liam Simpson, Kilkenny hurler.

== Deaths ==
- 10 March – Frank O'Connor, short story writer and memoirist (born 1903).
- 26 March – Joseph McGrath, Sinn Féin party and later Cumann na nGaedheal party TD, racehorse owner and breeder (born 1888).
- 28 March – Patrick McCartan, Sinn Féin member of parliament (MP) and TD, member of the First Dáil, founder member of Clann na Poblachta (born 1878).
- 1 April – Brian O'Nolan, satirist and humourist (born 1911).
- 29 April – Tom Hales, Irish Republican Army volunteer, fought in Anglo-Irish War and Irish Civil War (born 1892).
- 23 May – Jacko Heaslip, cricketer (born 1899).
- 3 June – Fionán Lynch, Sinn Féin MP and TD, member of the First Dáil, cabinet minister, Cumann na nGaedheal and Fine Gael party TD (born 1889).
- 7 June – James Hickey, Labour Party politician and Lord Mayor of Cork.
- 26 July – Maura Laverty, writer (born 1907).
- 12 August – Mike McTigue, boxer, light heavyweight champion of the world 1923–1925 (born 1892).
- 23 November – Seán T. O'Kelly, founding member of Fianna Fáil, Cabinet minister and second President of Ireland (born 1882).
- 14 December – Peter Paul Galligan, merchant, member of the First Dáil representing Cavan West (born 1888).
- 15 December – Conn Ward, Fianna Fáil politician (born 1890).
- 25 December – Thomas Harvey, cricketer and rugby player (born 1878).
- 27 December – Sim Walton, hurler (Tullaroan, Kilkenny) (born 1870).
- 31 December – Danny Ryan, hurler (Moycarkey-Borris, Kilkenny) (born 1880).

=== Full date unknown ===
- Diarmuid Murphy, writer, theatre and film producer (born 1895).
- Sydney Sparkes Orr, Professor of Philosophy at the University of Tasmania (born 1914).

== See also ==
- 1966 in Irish television
