= 1961 in Ireland =

- Centuries: 18th; 19th; 20th; 21st
- Decades: 1940s; 1950s; 1960s; 1970s; 1980s
- See also: 1961 in Northern Ireland; Other events of 1961; List of years in Ireland

Events in the year 1961 in Ireland.

== Incumbents ==
- President: Éamon de Valera
- Taoiseach: Seán Lemass (FF)
- Tánaiste: Seán MacEntee (FF)
- Minister for Finance: James Ryan (FF)
- Chief Justice:
  - Conor Maguire (until 11 June 1961)
  - Cearbhall Ó Dálaigh (from 16 June 1961)
- Dáil:
  - 16th (until 8 September 1961)
  - 17th (from 11 October 1961)
- Seanad:
  - 9th (until 1 September 1961)
  - 10th (from 14 December 1961)

== Events ==
=== January ===
- 6 January – Lieutenant-General Seán Mac Eoin left Dublin for the Congo to take up his new post as General Commanding Officer of the United Nations.
- 20 January – John F. Kennedy became President of the United States, the first of Irish-Catholic descent.
- 27 January – Laid-up tanker Trigonosemus broke free from its moorings during a gale in Lough Swilly.

=== April ===
- 9 April – The national census showed that County Cork's population had reached an all-time low, with just 330,000 (in the late 1950s it was 336,000).
- April – Professor Karl-Heinz Schaechterle, Professor of Transport and Urban Planning at the Technical University Munich, carried out traffic counts at 73 locations across Dublin in April to gain data to inform his General Traffic Plan for Dublin, which was published in 1965. Schaecterle had been employed by Dublin Corporation to study the system and propose plans to combat the chronic traffic congestion in the city.

=== June ===
- 10 June – President Éamon de Valera and his wife Sinéad greeted Prince Rainier and Princess Grace of Monaco at the presidential residence, Áras an Uachtaráin. It was the first official visit to Ireland by a head of state after it became an independent republic.
- 15 June – Prince Rainier and Princess Grace took tea in the Kelly homestead, near Newport, County Mayo from which the princess's grandfather, John Henry Kelly, left for America almost 100 years before.

=== September ===
- 16 September – Atlantic Hurricane Debbie made landfall at Dooega on Achill Island, then tracked across County Mayo, the only known tropical cyclone to make landfall in Ireland. Winds gusted up to 114 mph (183 km/h) off the island of Arranmore.

=== October ===
- 4 October – 1961 Irish general election: The Fianna Fáil party under Seán Lemass retained most seats and formed a minority government when members of the 17th Dáil assembled on 11 October.
- 16 October – Cork Airport opened.
- 25 October – St. John's Church in Sligo was reconstituted as the Cathedral Church for the Church of Ireland dioceses of Elphin and Ardagh, under the name of the Cathedral of St. Mary the Virgin and St. John the Baptist.

=== November ===
- November – Minister for Justice Charles Haughey established military courts which handed down long prison sentences to convicted Irish Republican Army men.
- 10 November – The Guinness ship Lady Gwendolen rammed and sank the Freshfield, anchored in fog on the River Mersey in Liverpool.

=== December ===
- 20 December – The last legal execution in Ireland, of Robert McGladdery for murder, occurred in Belfast, Northern Ireland.
- 31 December – Ireland's first television channel, Telefís Éireann, commenced broadcasting as president de Valera inaugurated the new service. The station's first broadcast was a new year countdown with celebrations at the Gresham Hotel in Dublin, relayed from the transmitter on Kippure mountain.

=== Full date unknown ===
- The last Irish Sea sail-using cargo vessel (and the last sail ship to trade on the River Mersey in Liverpool), the Arklow auxiliary schooner De Wadden, ceased trading commercially.
- German writer Enno Stephan's book Geheimauftrag Irland: Deutsche Agenten im Irischen Untergrundkampf 1939-1945 gave the first full account of Nazi spies in Ireland during "The Emergency" (the World War II period in Ireland).
- Passenger ferries operated by Dublin Corporation across the River Liffey in Dublin made a loss of £5,490 in 1961 (The income from the service was £2,821 and the cost to service them was £8,311). The ferries would end completely in 1984.

== Arts and literature ==
- Dominic Behan's autobiography Tell Dublin I Miss Her and autobiographical novel Teems of Times were published.
- John Montague's poetry Poisoned Lands was published.
- Tom Murphy's play A Whistle in the Dark premiered at the Theatre Royal Stratford East in London.

== Sports ==
=== Association football ===
- St Patrick's Athletic won the FAI Cup.
- Drumcondra F.C. won the League of Ireland.
- Linfield F.C. won the Irish League and the Irish Cup double.

=== Canoeing ===
- November – The 'Irish Canoe Union' was formed at a meeting in the Cliff Castle Hotel, Dalkey.

== Births ==
- 5 January – Rachel Hardiman, Irish cricketer
- 6 January – Fergal Keane, writer and broadcast journalist.
- 19 January – Eoghan Corry, journalist and author.
- 25 January – Liam Currams, Offaly hurler and Gaelic footballer.
- 28 February – Barry McGuigan, world featherweight champion boxer.
- 8 March – Kevin Hennessy, Cork hurler.
- 20 March – Michael O'Leary, chief executive of the low-cost airline Ryanair.
- 27 March – Mark Cohen, cricketer.
- 28 March – Orla Brady, actress.
- 17 May –
  - Enya, singer.
  - Mairéad Ní Mhaonaigh, fiddle player and singer.
- 21 May – John Cregan, Fianna Fáil party Teachta Dála (TD) for Limerick West.
- 1 June – Michael Nugent, writer and dramatist.
- 2 June – Liam Cunningham, actor.
- 3 July – Mark Keane, cognitive scientist and author.
- 7 August – Roddy Collins, association football player and manager.
- 8 August – The Edge, guitarist with the band U2.
- 27 August – John Hodgins, Cork hurler.
- 30 August – Ger Cunningham, Cork hurler.
- 15 September - Teresa Mannion, RTE news reporter.
- 25 September – Ronnie Whelan, association football player.
- 13 October – Michael Walsh, Kilkenny hurler.
- 25 October – Willie Walsh, chief executive officer of Aer Lingus and British Airways.
- 27 October – Margaret Mazzantini, writer.
- 31 October – Larry Mullen, rock drummer with the band U2.
- 8 November – Seán Haughey, Fianna Fáil TD for Dublin North-East, son of Charles Haughey and Maureen Haughey.
- 11 December – Dave King, vocalist and songwriter.
- 12 December – Daniel O'Donnell, singer.
- Full date unknown
  - Michelle Rocca, socialite.
  - Kevin Sharkey, songwriter and painter.
  - John Spillane, singer songwriter.

== Deaths ==
- 14 January – Barry Fitzgerald, Academy Award-winning actor (born 1888).
- 18 January – Joseph Connolly, Fianna Fáil politician (born 1885).
- 4 February – Edward Pakenham, 6th Earl of Longford, politician, dramatist and poet (born 1902).
- 7 May – Carmel Snow, journalist and editor of the American edition of Harper's Bazaar from 1934 to 1958 (born 1887).
- 12 August – Ion Hamilton Benn, 1st Baronet, businessman and British politician (born 1863).
- 25 September – James Crichton, soldier, recipient of the Victoria Cross for gallantry in 1918 at Crèvecœur, France (born 1879).
- 6 October – Achey Kelly, cricketer (born 1903).
- 16 November – T. C. Hammond, Anglican clergyman, Principal of Moore Theological College in Sydney (born 1877).
- 8 December – Séumas Robinson, member of Irish Volunteers and Irish Republican Army (born 1888).
- 24 December – Con Clifford, retired Kerry Gaelic footballer and businessman (born 1887).
- Full date unknown – Patrick MacDonogh, poet (born 1902).

== See also ==
- 1961 in Irish television
