= 1969 in Ireland =

- Centuries: 18th; 19th; 20th; 21st
- Decades: 1940s; 1950s; 1960s; 1970s; 1980s
- See also: 1969 in Northern Ireland; Other events of 1969; List of years in Ireland

Events in the year 1969 in Ireland.

== Incumbents ==
- President: Éamon de Valera
- Taoiseach: Jack Lynch (FF)
- Tánaiste:
  - Frank Aiken (FF) (until 2 July 1969)
  - Erskine H. Childers (FF) (from 2 July 1969)
- Minister for Finance: Charles Haughey (FF)
- Chief Justice: Cearbhall Ó Dálaigh
- Dáil:
  - 18th (until 22 May 1969)
  - 19th (from 2 July 1969)
- Seanad:
  - 11th (until 24 July 1969)
  - 12th (from 5 November 1969)

== Events ==
=== January ===
- 1 January – The People's Democracy civil rights march left Belfast for Derry.
- 4 January – Militant loyalists, including off-duty Ulster Special Constabulary ("B-Specials"), attacked civil rights marchers in County Londonderry.
- 10 January – Protestors in Northern Ireland defied police orders to abandon a planned march.
- 27 January – Ian Paisley was jailed for three months for illegal assembly in Northern Ireland.

=== March ===
- 4 March – The Lichfield Report was issued. It proposed the creation of a "University of Limerick" which would be "orientated towards technological subjects".
- 19 March – Ireland received its first loan from the World Bank.
- 22 March – Civil rights demonstrations took place all over Northern Ireland.

=== April ===
- 17 April – Bernadette Devlin, the 21-year-old student and civil rights campaigner, won the Mid-Ulster by-election. She was the youngest-ever female Member of Parliament in the United Kingdom.
- 20 April – British troops arrived in Northern Ireland as a back-up to the Royal Ulster Constabulary.
- 28 April – The Prime Minister of Northern Ireland, Terence O'Neill, resigned.

=== May ===
- 1 May – Major James Chichester-Clark succeeded Terence O'Neill as the Northern Irish Prime Minister.
- 7 May – The Minister for Finance, Charles Haughey, announced tax exemptions for painters, sculptors, writers, and composers on earnings gained from works of cultural merit.
- 10 May – Following his shock resignation as president of France on April 28, Charles de Gaulle landed at Cork Airport with his wife Yvonne and aide-de-camp General François Flohic to begin an unannounced six-week private visit to Ireland, until June 19. The Irish government was unaware of their visit until they arrived in Sneem, County Kerry later in the day.
- 17 May – The first exhibition in Ireland of works by Pablo Picasso opened at the Exhibition Hall in Trinity College Dublin. Paintings, sculpture, ceramics, drawings, and graphics were displayed until the show ended on 30 August.

=== June ===
- June – Penneys department store in Dublin, predecessor of multinational fast fashion retailer Primark, was established by Arthur Ryan on behalf of the Weston family at 47 Mary Street.
- 18 June
  - The 1969 Irish general election for Dáil Éireann was held.
  - Charles de Gaulle and his wife Yvonne were greeted by President de Valera at Áras an Uachtaráin on the second last day of their 40-day visit to Ireland.

=== July ===
- 20 July – Telefís Éireann, which normally stopped broadcasting by midnight during the 1960s, transmitted its first all-night programme when the first men landed on the Moon at 9.17 pm, Irish time. The moonwalk began at 3.39 the next morning and ended at 6.11. The entire broadcast was hosted live by Kevin O'Kelly, working alone in front of the camera, and he won a Jacob's Television Award for his performance.
- 21 July
  - A message of goodwill from President Éamon De Valera, along with messages from 72 other heads of state, was placed on the surface of the moon by astronaut Buzz Aldrin during the first moonwalk, performed during the Apollo 11 mission. De Valera's message read: "May God grant that the skill and courage which have enabled man to alight upon the Moon will enable him, also, to secure peace and happiness upon the Earth and avoid the danger of self-destruction." The messages of world leaders were photographed and micro-reduced in size 200 times, then inscribed on a half-dollar-coin-sized silicon disc which was encased in an aluminium capsule to protect it. The messages are readable through a microscope.
  - President de Valera sent U.S. President Richard Nixon a telegram of congratulations and admiration following the first crewed Moon landing by Americans Neil Armstrong and Buzz Aldrin.

=== August ===
- 1 August
  - A huge protest rally over events in Northern Ireland was held outside the General Post Office, Dublin. The crowd demanded that the Irish Army cross the border.
  - The farthing and halfpenny coins were withdrawn from circulation as Ireland moved towards decimalisation.
- 3 August – Taoiseach Jack Lynch made a state visit to Lebanon.
- 5 August
  - Belfast experienced the worst sectarian rioting since 1935.
  - RTÉ Studio bombing: The RTÉ broadcasting studios in Donnybrook, Dublin were bombed at 1.30 am. The studio building was damaged and the blast knocked a security guard to the ground but he was not injured. The Ulster Volunteer Force terrorist group admitted responsibility on 24 October.
- 12 August – Rioting broke out in Derry in the Battle of the Bogside, the first major confrontation of The Troubles.
- 13–17 August – Sectarian rioting took place in Northern Ireland.
- 13 August – As the Battle of the Bogside continued, Taoiseach Jack Lynch made a speech on television saying that the Irish government "can no longer stand by" and demanded a United Nations peace-keeping force for Northern Ireland.
- 14 August – British troops were deployed for the first time in Northern Ireland to restore law and order. Their presence was welcomed at first by many in the Catholic population of Derry.
- 15 August – A night of shooting and burning took place in Belfast. In Dublin, a Sinn Féin party protest meeting called for the boycott of British goods, Irish government protection of the people of Northern Ireland, and United Nations intervention.
- 16 August – British soldiers were deployed in particularly violent areas of Belfast.
- 17 August – Members of the Garda Síochána (police) clashed with protesters on O'Connell Street, Dublin, as a march against the Northern Ireland situation headed for the British embassy.
- 27 August – The B-Specials began to hand in their guns following a call by Lieutenant-General Ian Freeland to disband them. British Home Secretary, James Callaghan, visited Belfast.
- 30 August – Jack Lynch ordered the Irish Army Chief of Staff, General Seán Mac Eoin, to prepare a plan, called Exercise Armageddon, for possible incursions into Northern Ireland in defence of Catholic communities there.

=== September ===
- 10 September – The British Army started to construct the first of the Northern Ireland 'Peacelines' on the Falls–Shankill divide in Belfast, marking the first of many 'Peacewall' constructions across the city.

=== October ===
- 10 October – The Hunt Committee Report recommended an unarmed civil police force in Northern Ireland and abolition of the Ulster Special Constabulary.
- Undated – The grave of Wolfe Tone in Sallins, County Kildare was bombed by the Ulster Volunteer Force (UVF).

=== December ===
- 1 December – The Fianna Fáil party paid tribute to former taoiseach and party leader Seán Lemass as his forty-five years of public life came to an end.
- 26 December – One of the winged statues at the base of the O'Connell Monument in Dublin was destroyed in the early hours of the morning by a time-bomb that had been placed behind it the previous day by the UVF. No injuries were reported.
- 28 December – In the early hours of the morning, a car bomb exploded near the entrance to the Central Detective Bureau in Ship Street, near Dublin Castle. Nobody was injured.
- 31 December – The half crown coin was permanently withdrawn from circulation.
- Undated
  - The 1967 policy of free secondary education for all was fully implemented.
  - The last permanent residents left the island of Inis Cathaigh in the Shannon Estuary in County Clare.
  - The Irish Republican Army split into Official and Provisional wings.

== Arts and literature ==
- August – Andrew Boyd's historical work Holy War in Belfast was published in Tralee, going through six impressions in three years.
- 5 October – Samuel Beckett was awarded the Nobel Prize in Literature. His wife Suzanne called it a "catastrophe".
- December – Rock band Thin Lizzy was formed in Dublin.
- Donagh MacDonagh's poems A Warning to Conquerors were published in Dublin.

== Sports ==
Gaelic Football Finals: Kerry 0–10 Offaly 0–7 Hurling Finals: Kilkenny 2–15 Cork 2–9

== Births ==
- 6 January – Jonathan Philbin Bowman, journalist and radio presenter (died 2000).
- 19 January – Steve Staunton, former international association football player, former manager of the Republic of Ireland national football team.
- 8 February – Earl McCarthy, freestyle swimmer
- 15 March – Pat Fenlon, association football player and manager.
- 26 March – Billy Dooley, Offaly hurler.
- 31 March – Lawrence Patrick Parsons, Lord Oxmantown.
- 2 April – Ann Leonard, former Fianna Fáil party politician.
- 1 May – Mary Lou McDonald, Leader of Sinn Féin.
- 10 June – Breandán de Gallaí, Irish dancer.
- 13 June – Abe Elkinson, businessman.
- 16 June – Tommy Tiernan, comedian.
- 28 June – Angeline Ball, actress
- 1 July – Séamus Egan, musician.
- 10 August – Arthur Edward Rory Guinness, 4th Earl of Iveagh.
- 23 August – Brian Hayes, Fine Gael party Teachta Dála (TD) for Dublin South-West.
- 7 September – Barry Ferguson, association football player.
- 17 September – Ken Doherty, snooker player.
- 22 October – Owen Casey, tennis player.
- 24 October – Emma Donoghue, playwright, literary historian, and novelist.
- 29 October – Anthony Daly, Clare hurler and manager.
- 28 November – Sonia O'Sullivan, runner, World and European Championship gold medallist.
- 30 November – Catherina McKiernan, athlete.
- 16 December – Michelle Smith, swimmer and triple Olympic gold medallist.

Full date unknown
- Liz Allen, journalist and writer.
- Kevin Barry, fiction writer.
- Ciarán Farrell, composer.

== Deaths ==
- 24 January – Patrick Hogan, Labour Party TD, Ceann Comhairle of Dáil Éireann (born 1885).
- 9 March – Martin King, Galway hurler (born 1900)
- 30 March – James Foley, cricketer (born 1898).
- 1 April – Francis de Groot, member of the right-wing New Guard of Australia (born 1888).
- 8 April – James Duffy, soldier, recipient of the Victoria Cross for gallantry in 1917 at Kereina Peak, Palestine (born 1889).
- 23 April – Florence Wycherley, independent TD (born 1908).
- 23 May – Tom Barry, hurler (London-Irish) (born 1879).
- 22 June – Thomas J. O'Connell, trade unionist, Labour Party leader, TD, and Senator (born 1882).
- 4 August – Stanley Bergin, cricketer (born 1926).
- 8 August – Bulmer Hobson, nationalist, an early leader of the Irish Republican Brotherhood (born 1883).
- September – Cecilia Thackaberry, Presentation Sisters nun, killed in Nigeria performing relief work (born 1909).
- 4 October – Cathal O'Shannon, politician, trade unionist and journalist (born 1893).
- 8 August – Bulmer Hobson, member of Irish Volunteers, socialist and writer (born 1882).
- 18 October – John "Pondoro" Taylor, hunter and writer (born 1904).
- 18 November – Bridget Dowling, Adolf Hitler's sister-in-law by her marriage to Alois Hitler Jr. (born 1891).
- 27 November – Séamus Ó Grianna, writer (born 1889).

== See also ==
- 1969 in Irish television
