= 1959 in Ireland =

- Centuries: 18th; 19th; 20th; 21st
- Decades: 1930s; 1940s; 1950s; 1960s; 1970s
- See also: 1959 in Northern Ireland; Other events of 1959; List of years in Ireland

Events from the year 1959 in Ireland.

== Incumbents ==
- President:
  - Seán T. O'Kelly (until 24 June 1959)
  - Éamon de Valera (from 25 June 1959)
- Taoiseach:
  - Éamon de Valera (FF) (until 23 June 1959)
  - Seán Lemass (FF) (from 23 June 1959)
- Tánaiste:
  - Seán Lemass (FF) (until 23 June 1959)
  - Seán MacEntee (FF) (from 23 June 1959)
- Minister for Finance: James Ryan (FF)
- Chief Justice: Conor Maguire
- Dáil: 16th
- Seanad: 9th

== Events ==
- 7 January – Dáil Éireann debated a motion that Éamon de Valera's position as controlling director of the Irish Press newspaper could be regarded as incompatible with his duties as Taoiseach.
- 23 January – The government was considering the introduction of a pay-as-you-earn system of income tax.
- 10 February – Unions voted to end the 15-year split in the Irish trade union movement. The Irish Congress of Trade Unions resulted from the merger of the Irish Trades Union Congress and the Congress of Irish Unions.
- 8 April – James Dillon of the Fine Gael party wanted to abolish compulsory Irish language studies at school as he felt they were counter-productive.
- 17 June – In the 1959 presidential election, Fianna Fáil party candidate Éamon de Valera beat Fine Gael party candidate Seán Mac Eoin, and was inaugurated at Dublin Castle on June 25 as Ireland's third president.
- 9 July – The first twelve female recruits were selected to join the Garda Síochána (police).
- 29 July – The new Department of Transport and Power was established. Erskine Childers was the first Minister, and Thekla Beere was departmental Secretary, the first woman to achieve this grade in the Irish Civil Service.
- 10 September – Wexford Bridge was officially opened in Wexford.
- 22 September – At its inaugural conference the Irish Congress of Trade Unions attacked the government of Northern Ireland for not recognising the new organisation.
- 4 October – Three men collapsed and died at Croke Park during the All-Ireland Hurling Final Replay.
- 21 October – James Dillon was elected leader of the Fine Gael Party. He replaced Richard Mulcahy as leader and John A. Costello as parliamentary leader.
- 4 December – Twelve new female members of the Garda Síochána (police), known as banghardaí, passed out of the training depot in the Phoenix Park in Dublin.
- Figures released on 4 February 1960 showed that 118 million telephone calls were made in 1959.

== Arts and literature ==
- 2 February – John B. Keane's play Sive was premiered at Walsh's Ballroom, Listowel, by an amateur group.
- 12 February – The first edition of the Irish Music Charts Top 10 was printed in the Evening Herald newspaper. Elvis Presley's "One Night" became the first song to top the charts. (The official charts were founded by RTÉ in 1962.)
- 3 March – The film Home Is the Hero, based on the play by and starring Walter Macken, was released in Dublin.
- 24 June – Walt Disney's film Darby O'Gill and the Little People, based on H. T. Kavanagh's short stories, had its world premiere in Dublin.
- 15 September – Donagh MacDonagh's play Lady Spider, a retelling of the Deirdre myth, premiered at the Gas Company Theatre, Dún Laoghaire.
- 28 September – Dominic Behan's play Posterity Be Damned premiered at the Gaiety Theatre, Dublin.
- 30 September – The film of Mise Éire, made by George Morrison with music by Seán Ó Riada for Gael Linn, premiered to conclude the Cork Film Festival, the first feature-length Irish language film.
- December – British-Irish actor Peter O'Toole married Welsh actress Siân Phillips in Dublin.

== Sports ==
=== Association football ===
- St Patrick's Athletic won the FAI Cup
- Shamrock Rovers won the League of Ireland

=== Hurling ===
- Waterford GAA won the All-Ireland Senior Hurling Championship

== Births ==
- 6 January – Davy Spillane, folk rock musician, uilleann piper.
- 6 February – Dermot Bolger, novelist, playwright and poet.
- 22 February – Matthew Dwyer, cricketer.
- 23 February – Linda Nolan, singer (died 2025).
- 12 April – Tony Mulcahy, politician.
- 21 May
  - Fergus Johnston, composer.
  - Brian Lenihan, Fianna Fáil Teachta Dála (TD) for Dublin West and Minister for Finance (died 2011).
- 13 June
  - Mairead McGuinness, journalist, Member of the European Parliament.
  - Mary Wallace, Fianna Fáil TD for Meath East and Minister of State at the Department of Agriculture and Food
- 24 June – June Rodgers, comedian, singer and actor
- 4 August – John Gormley, leader of the Green Party, Minister for the Environment, Heritage and Local Government and TD for Dublin South-East.
- 9 August – Hugh Brady, President of University College Dublin.
- 28 August – Lorcan Cranitch, actor.
- 28 September – Michael Scott, genre fiction author.
- 1 October – Billy Timmins, Fine Gael TD.
- 8 October – Gavin Friday, singer, songwriter, composer and painter.
- 20 October – Niamh Cusack, actress.
- 7 November – John Anderson, association football player.
- 28 November – Stephen Roche, road racing cyclist, in 1987 wins Tour de France, the Giro d'Italia and the World Cycling Championship.
- 4 December – Paul McGrath, association football player.
- 20 December – Patrick Walker, association football player and manager.
- Full date unknown – Lorcan O'Herlihy, architect and artist in the United States.

== Deaths ==
- 9 January – A. M. Sullivan, lawyer (born 1871).
- January – Patrick O'Connell, association football player and manager (born 1887).
- 1 February – Frank Shannon, Irish-born American actor (born 1874)
- 4 February – Una O'Connor, actress (born 1880).
- 7 March – T. C. Murray, dramatist (born 1873).
- 13 March – Robert Forde, Antarctic explorer (born 1875).
- 16 March – Dick Doyle, Kilkenny hurler (born 1884).
- 21 April – Sep Lambert, cricketer (born 1876).
- 15 May – Liam de Róiste, company director, member First Dáil (Pro-Treaty), representing Cork City.
- 16 May – Elisha Scott, footballer (born 1894).
- 13 June – Seán Lester, diplomat and last Secretary General of the League of Nations (born 1888).
- 25 June – Mick Kenny, Galway hurler (born 1893).
- 21 August – Denis Devlin, poet and diplomat (born 1908).
- 1 December – Caitlín Brugha, Sinn Féin TD (born 1879).
