= 1962 in Ireland =

- Centuries: 18th; 19th; 20th; 21st
- Decades: 1940s; 1950s; 1960s; 1970s; 1980s
- See also: 1962 in Northern Ireland; Other events of 1962; List of years in Ireland

Events in the year 1962 in Ireland.

== Incumbents ==
- President: Éamon de Valera
- Taoiseach: Seán Lemass (FF)
- Tánaiste: Seán MacEntee (FF)
- Minister for Finance: James Ryan (FF)
- Chief Justice: Cearbhall Ó Dálaigh
- Dáil: 17th
- Seanad: 10th

== Events ==
- 26 February – The Irish Republican Army officially called off its Border Campaign in Northern Ireland.
- 13 March – Irish artists left Dublin Airport for the Congo to entertain United Nations troops there.
- 17 March – President Éamon de Valera and his wife Sinéad had a private audience with Pope John XXIII in Rome.
- 5 April – A final train ran on the west Cork railway.
- 8 May – Irish troops left for a peace-keeping mission in the Congo.
- 6 July – Gay Byrne presented the first edition of The Late Late Show television programme on Telefís Éireann. He went on to present the show for 37 years.
- 13 July – Secretary General of the United Nations U Thant arrived in Dublin. He paid tribute to Irish soldiers who fought in the Congo.
- 21 August – Former United States President Dwight Eisenhower arrived in Belfast on a four-day visit to Ireland.
- 13 November – Aer Lingus air hostesses received new uniforms. The colours were fern-green and St. Patrick's blue.

== Arts and literature ==
- 30 June – The Theatre Royal, Dublin closed.
- 4 December – The first Jacob's broadcasting awards ceremony took place in Dublin.
- Irish folk music group the Abbey Tavern Singers was formed in Howth.
- Irish folk music band The Chieftains was formed by Paddy Moloney in Dublin.
- Irish folk music band The Dubliners was formed at O'Donoghue's Pub in Dublin.
- Eavan Boland published 23 Poems while an undergraduate at Trinity College Dublin.
- Ewart Milne's poetry A Garland for the Green was published.
- Eoghan Ó Tuairisc published his Irish language prose epic L'Attaque in Dublin.
- Cecil Woodham-Smith published her history The Great Hunger: Ireland: 1845–1849.

== Sports ==
=== Association football ===
- Shelbourne FC won the League of Ireland championship for the seventh time with a 1–0 play-off victory over Cork Celtic thanks to a Ben Hannigan goal.

== Births ==
- 1 January – Jamie O'Neill, author.
- 9 January – Ray Houghton, association football player, in Scotland to an Irish father.
- 2 March – Marie-Louise Fitzpatrick, children's author and illustrator.
- 6 April – Anne Cassin, RTE newsreader.
- 13 April – Harry Kenny, association football player.
- 7 May – Paul Kimmage, cyclist and sports journalist.
- 9 June – Bobby Browne, association football player.
- 15 June – Martin Earley, road bicycle racer.
- 26 June – Cyprian Brady, Fianna Fáil Teachta Dála (TD) for Dublin Central.
- 4 July – Martin Hayes, fiddle player.
- 11 July – Pauline McLynn, actress and writer.
- 14 July – Eamon Delaney, author and journalist.
- 19 July – Caitríona Ruane, Sinn Féin party Member of the Legislative Assembly and Minister for Education in Northern Ireland.
- 14 August
  - Dan Boyle, former Green Party TD, senator.
  - Peter Eccles, association football player.
- 1 September – Tony Cascarino, association football player.
- 11 October
  - Anne Enright, Man Booker Prize-winning author.
  - Eddie Hobbs, financial adviser and television presenter.
- 2 December – Kevin Brady, association football player.
- Full date unknown – Tom Spillane, Kerry Gaelic footballer.

== Deaths ==
- 1 February – Thomas Westropp Bennett, Cumann na nGaedheal party member of the Seanad, Cathaoirleach (chairperson) of the Seanad (born 1867).
- 13 March – Anne Acheson, sculptor (born 1882).
- 14 March – Eileen Costello, Independent member of the 1922 Seanad.
- 25 June – Robert Gwynn, cricketer (born 1877).
- 4 July – William Harman, cricketer (born 1869).
- 16 July – Frank Gallagher, Irish Volunteer and author (born 1893).
- 24 July – Margaret Buckley, president of Sinn Féin party from 1937 to 1950 (born 1879).
- 26 October – Emily Anderson, British Foreign Office cryptanalyst, scholar of German and musicologist, in London (born 1891).

== See also ==
- 1962 in Irish television
