= Mark Caughey =

Northern Irish footballer

Personal information
- Full name: Mark Caughey
- Date of birth: 27 August 1960 (age 66)
- Place of birth: Belfast, Northern Ireland
- Height: 1.80 m (5 ft 11 in)
- Position: Striker

Senior career*
Years	Team	Apps	(Gls)
1978–1980	Glentoran		
1980–1985	RUC		
1985–1986	Linfield	21	(5)
1986–1987	Hibernian	14	(0)
1987	→ Burnley (loan)	8	(0)
1987	Hamilton Academical	21	(13)
1987–1988	Motherwell	15	(0)
1988–1989	Ards		
1989–1992	Bangor	43	(14)
1992–1993	Glentoran	13	(1)
1993–1995	Limavady United		
1995–1996	Portstewart		
Total		58	(13)

International career
1986	Northern Ireland	2	(0)
- * Club domestic league appearances and goals

Mark Caughey (born 27 August 1960) is a former Northern Ireland international footballer, who played as a striker.

He earned two caps for the Northern Ireland national football team in 1986, and was included in their 1986 FIFA World Cup squad.

During his club career he played for Glentoran, RUC, Linfield, Hibernian, Burnley, Hamilton Academical, Motherwell, Ards, Bangor, Limavady United, and Portstewart.
