= Martin O'Brien (hurler) =

Irish hurler (1885–1958)

Personal information
- Native name: Máirtín Ó Briain (Irish)
- Born: 27 August 1885 Thurles, County Tipperary, Ireland
- Died: 24 December 1958 (aged 73) Thurles, County Tipperary, Ireland
- Occupation: Shopkeeper

Sport
- Sport: Hurling
- Position: Right corner-back
Club
- Years: Club
- Thurles Sarsfields
Club titles
- Tipperary titles: 6
Inter-county
- Years: County
- 1906-1912: Tipperary
Inter-county titles
- Munster titles: 3
- All-Irelands: 2

Martin O'Brien (27 August 1885 – 24 December 1958) was an Irish hurler. His championship career with the Tipperary senior team lasted from 1906 until 1912.

== Biography ==
Raised in Drombane near Thurles, County Tipperary, O'Brien was the fifth of twelve children born to James and Bridget O'Brien. He was educated locally and later worked as a shopkeeper in Thurles.

O'Brien won All-Ireland Championship medals with the Tipperary senior team in 1906 and 1908, and also won three Munster Championship medals. As a member of the Thurles Sarsfields club, O'Brien won six County Championship medals. He played his last game in 1917.

O'Brien died from bladder cancer on 24 December 1958.

== Honours ==
Thurles Sarsfields

- Tipperary Senior Hurling Championship (6): 1904, 1906, 1907, 1908, 1909, 1911

Tipperary

- All-Ireland Senior Hurling Championship (2): 1906, 1908
- Munster Senior Hurling Championship (3): 1906, 1908, 1909
