= Letitia Gwynne =

Letitia Fitzpatrick (born 23 January 1962, Belfast) is a journalist.

Fitzpatrick has worked for as a journalist for the Irish News, BBC NI, UTV and ACM.

== Career ==
Fitzpatrick was a reporter for the Irish News in Belfast from 1983 to 1988. She worked as a journalist for BBC Northern Ireland from 1988 to 1997. She then joined UTV and worked there for 12 years, as a senior TV journalist and presenter.

She did voluntary work for the Northern Ireland Cancer Network.

Between 2009 and 2015, Fitzpatrick worked for Citybeat radio and for the BBC as a freelance journalist on Panorama, Spotlight, The One Show and Children in Need.

In 2018, Fitzpatrick was awarded the Paul Harris Fellowship from Wauchope Rotary.

== Personal life ==
Fitzpatrick has two adult children from her first marriage. Her second husband died in 2007.
