= Abe Elkinson =

Irish businessman (born 1969)

- Born: 13 June 1969 (age 56); Dublin, Ireland
- Occupations: Businessman; philanthropist

Abe Elkinson (born 13 June 1969) is a businessman who lives in Manchester, England. He was born in Dublin, Ireland. One of five children whose father died of heart attack, this loss was to be the catalyst behind Elkinson's company Trust Medical.

Real Business Magazine cited Trust Medical as one of 50 UK companies that are 'The Cream of British Startups'. Through his own personal experience, Elkinson is determined that Trust Medical will assist in preventing out of hospital deaths due to heart attack and workplace accidents. To help deliver his message, Elkinson teamed up with presenter and GP Mark Porter and Journalist and broadcaster Michael Buerk. He has associations with the British Cardiac Patients Association, the Ambulance Service and Philips Medical Systems. Trust Medical is the UK's first company to specialise in providing resuscitation equipment, first aid training and occupational health services to UK organisations. Trust Medical was closed 29 January 2017.

Elkinson is a director of Elkinson and Jones, a company that provides advice to small- to medium-sized enterprises seeking corporate finance, business planning and structuring.
