= Uel Graham =

Irish former cricketer (born 1967)

Cricket information
- Batting: Right-handed
- Bowling: Right arm medium

International information
- National side: Ireland

Career statistics
Competition	First-class	List A
Matches	2	10
Runs scored	64	120
Batting average	32.00	15.00
100s/50s	0/0	0/0
Top score	35	25
Balls bowled	114	314
Wickets	1	0
Bowling average	43.00	–
5 wickets in innings	0	–
10 wickets in match	0	–
Best bowling	1/8	–
Catches/stumpings	0/–	1/–
- Source: CricInfo, 15 November 2022

Samuel "Uel" Graham (born 9 January 1967) is an Irish former cricketer. A right-handed batsman and right-arm medium pace bowler, he played 18 times for the Ireland cricket team between 1992 and 1997, including two first-class matches, both of which were against Scotland, and ten List A matches.

== Playing career ==
Graham was born 9 January 1967 in Lisburn, County Antrim, Northern Ireland. Graham made his debut for Ireland in June 1992 against Middlesex. The same month he made his first-class debut against Scotland and his List A debut in the NatWest Trophy against Durham. He then played against the MCC the following month, before spending 18 months out of the Ireland side.

He was named in the Ireland squad for the 1994 ICC Trophy and played in five of the matches. Later that year, he played List A matches against Leicestershire and Northamptonshire and his final first-class match against Scotland, in addition to games against the MCC and New Zealand. In the match against the MCC he scored 55 in the Irish first innings, his only half century for Ireland He also played in the Triple Crown Tournament that year, taking 4/49 in the match against Wales, his best bowling figures for Ireland.

In 1995, he played in Ireland's early-season Benson & Hedges Cup matches against Surrey, Sussex, Kent and Somerset, also playing against the Duchess of Norfolk's XI at Arundel Castle, the MCC at Lord's, a NatWest Trophy match against Yorkshire and against the West Indies before again playing in the Triple Crown Tournament.

In 1996, he played Benson & Hedges Cup matches against Hampshire and Sussex, also playing in the first European Championship tournament in Denmark. He was named in the Ireland squad for the 1997 ICC Trophy and played just one game against Singapore, which was his last for Ireland.

== Statistics ==
In all matches for Ireland, he scored 544 runs at an average of 19.43, and took 22 wickets at an average of 38.09.
