= Charles McAuley =

Irish painter (1910–1999)

Charles McAuley (1910–1999) was an Irish painter. He was born on 15 March 1910 at Lubatavish, Glenaan, near Cushendall, the youngest of eight children in a family whose forebears had inhabited the Glens for many generations.

McAuley pursued painting from an early age, in a rural area when farming was one of the main sources of life and income. He went on to become one of Ireland's most celebrated landscape and figurative painters, his work synonymous with the Glens of Antrim.

A key encounter came in his mid-teens, when the artist James Humbert Craig, who was arts adjudicator at the Feis na nGleann, praised several of his youthful paintings, telling him: "You go ahead with this, and you'll do well." His paintings depicted the rivers, mountains, seascapes and rural life that surrounded him. He briefly studied at both the Belfast School of Art and Glasgow School of Art until he returned to his homeland to which he was utterly devoted. He was a member of the Royal Ulster Academy and the Royal Hibernian Academy.

In 1984 he collaborated with his friend, the poet John Hewitt on The Day of the Corncrake, a publication by the Glens of Antrim Historical Society, in which 25 colour reproductions of his paintings were coupled with 30 poems about the Glens by Hewitt. In a foreword, Hewitt wrote that his "awareness was not merely graphic but demographic. This has made him for me the authentic regional artist, the painter who belongs to and finds his themes in a known place. Nowadays, with the rapid flow of international styles succeeding each other, this is a distinctive title one can seldom confer."

In a BBC television film made in the mid-1980s, he remarked that he might have enjoyed more success if he had made a career in the wider world, but that he certainly would not have been happier: "I've spent my boyhood and manhood in the Glens. . .and I have no desire to leave them until I die."

McAuley died on 30 September 1999. On his death, BBC NI described him as “one of Ireland’s greatest colourists, but most significantly, a true and modest gentleman”.

The artist's obituary in The Irish Times noted “Charles McAuley could fairly have claimed to be the artist of "the Glens"; for his native knowledge of the local landscape and people brought to the best of his work a special quality of emotion. Yet it is not a claim he would have made for himself, for self-promotion was a trait absent from his personality.”

He was the uncle of BBC Northern Ireland broadcasters and writers Tony McAuley and Roisin McAuley.

Many of his works are in private collections internationally. There are several of his paintings in public collections, for example at the Ulster Museum and Queen's University Belfast.
