= 1967 in Ireland =

- Centuries: 18th; 19th; 20th; 21st
- Decades: 1940s; 1950s; 1960s; 1970s; 1980s
- See also: 1967 in Northern Ireland; Other events of 1967; List of years in Ireland

Events in the year 1967 in Ireland.

== Incumbents ==
- President: Éamon de Valera
- Taoiseach: Jack Lynch (FF)
- Tánaiste: Frank Aiken (FF)
- Minister for Finance: Charles Haughey (FF)
- Chief Justice: Cearbhall Ó Dálaigh
- Dáil: 18th
- Seanad: 11th

== Events ==
=== January ===
- 9 January – Demonstrations by the National Farmers' Association (NFA) caused major chaos when farm machinery blocked many roads.

=== April ===
- 7 April – The American Friendship 7 mission astronaut John Glenn was interviewed by RTÉ Television during a three-day visit to Ireland.
- 18 April – The minister for education, Donogh O'Malley, revealed his plan for a single multi-denominational University of Dublin. This would combine University College Dublin and Trinity College Dublin. The plan was not enacted.
- 23 April – Hollywood actress and singer Jayne Mansfield had a cabaret show scheduled for this date at Mount Brandon Hotel in Tralee, Co. Kerry. However, it was cancelled in the spite of massive condemnation and public outcry led by the local Catholic clergy.
- Unknown date – The Catholic Church opened its own communications center on Booterstown Avenue in Co. Dublin.

=== June ===
- 30 June – Jacqueline Kennedy arrived in Ireland for a holiday with her children, Caroline and John. She was received at the president's residence, Áras an Uachtaráin, where she was an overnight guest, by President Éamon de Valera and his wife, Sinéad. She was hosted in the evening by Taoiseach Jack Lynch and his wife Máirín at a state banquet in Dublin Castle.

=== July ===
- 1 July – Jacqueline Kennedy attended the Irish Sweeps Derby horse race at the Curragh with the taoiseach and his wife.

=== September ===
- 4 September – Ireland's free secondary-school transport scheme began. The CIÉ transport company brought 38,000 pupils to 350 schools.

=== November ===
- 3 November – The Irish Republican Army hijacked the RTÉ Radio broadcasting frequency at midday, interrupting the news read by broadcaster David Timlin, to tell listeners that Ireland joining the Common Market would be "disastrous".
- 4 November – Taoiseach Jack Lynch returned to Dublin following talks on the European Community with President Charles de Gaulle in Paris.

=== December ===
- 4 December – A mainframe system described as "one of the most sophisticated computers in the world" was switched on by the minister for transport and power Erskine Childers in Shannon, County Clare. The Honeywell 120 computer cost £70,000 and was assigned to perform technical and accounting analyses for international clients. One hundred and fifty local women were needed to perform data preparation tasks to feed the machine.
- 11 December – Taoiseach Jack Lynch and the Northern Ireland prime minister, Terence O'Neill, met for talks in Stormont. Lynch's car was snowballed by the unionist, Ian Paisley, and his supporters.
- 22 December – In a pre-Christmas message to Irish people living and working in the United Kingdom, Taoiseach Jack Lynch urged them not to return to Ireland for Christmas because of the foot-and-mouth outbreak in the UK.
- 29 December – The minister for labour, Patrick Hillery, announced details of a new redundancy payments scheme which took effect from New Year's Day.

=== Full date unknown ===
- The Galtee Meats company was founded.
- Dublin City Corporation balloted rate-payers on Westmoreland Street, Dublin to see if they would be in favour of renaming the street as President Kennedy Street (during John F. Kennedy's visit to Dublin in 1963, his motorcade traveled along Westmoreland Street). The vote failed when only 33 ratepayers voted in favor, short of the 47 required.

== Arts and literature ==
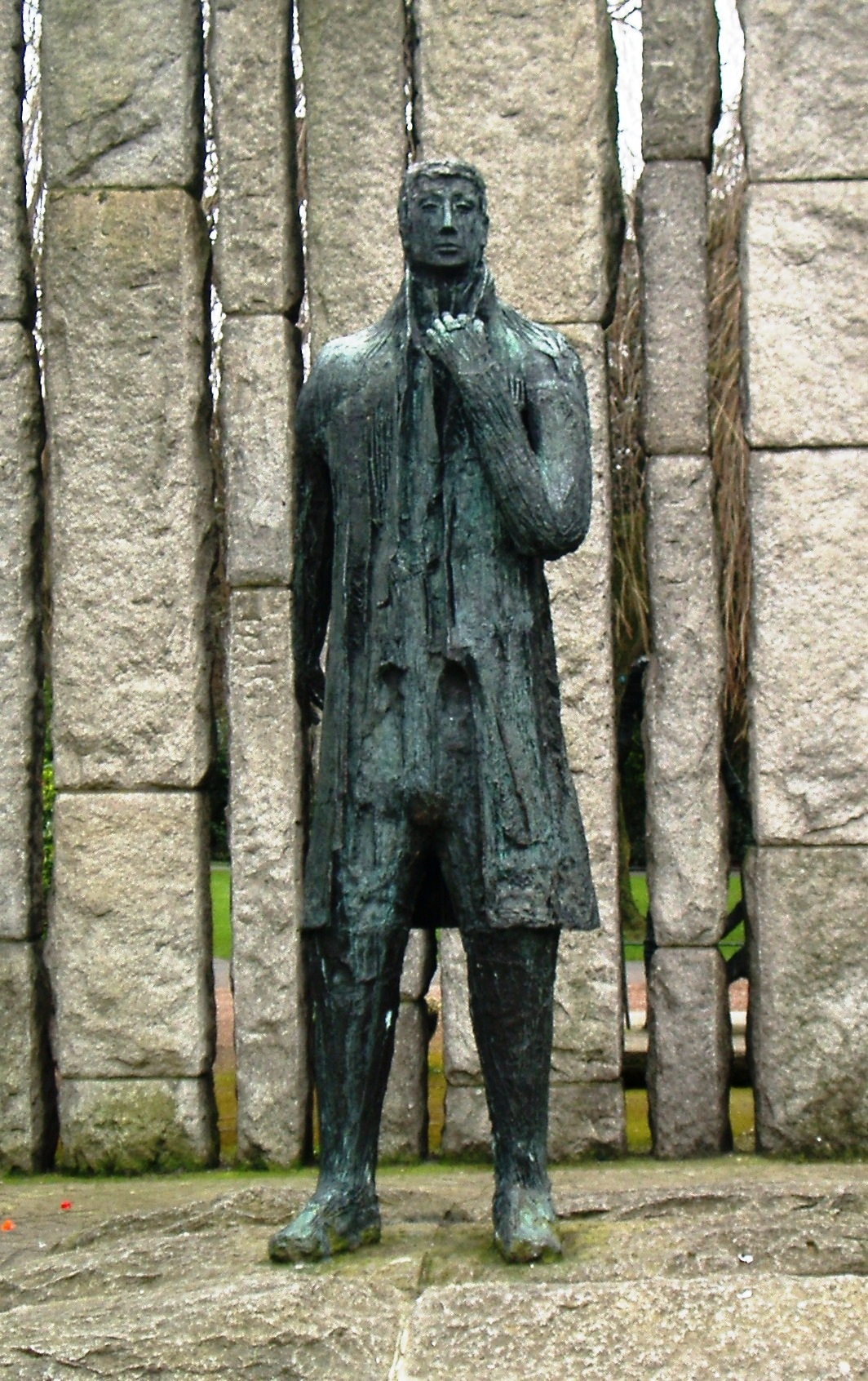
Wolfe Tone statue by Edward Delaney

- 17 September – British rock band Pink Floyd performed their only concert in Ireland at the Arcadia Ballroom in Cork.
- 29 September – The Focus Theatre in Dublin opened its doors for the first time.
- 2 December – Poet Patrick Kavanagh was buried in his native Inniskeen, County Monaghan.

=== Date unknown ===
- The Censorship of Publications Act provided that prohibition orders made on the grounds of indecency or obscenity would expire after twelve years.
- The New Writers Press was founded in Dublin, to publish poetry, by poet Michael Smith and his wife Irene, and poet Trevor Joyce.
- Eavan Boland's poems New Territory were published.
- John Montague's poems A Chosen Light were published.
- Flann O'Brien's novel, The Third Policeman (written 1939–40), was published posthumously in London.
- Edward Delaney's bronze statue Wolfe Tone was completed.
- The Project Arts Centre was founded in Dublin.

== Sport ==
- 21 January – The Ireland rugby team beat Australia 15–8 in Dublin.
- 13 May – Ireland became the first Home Nation to win in the Southern Hemisphere, beating Australia 15–9 in Sydney and thereby completing a historic double over the Wallabies.
- 3 September – Kilkenny defeated Tipperary by 3–8 to 2–7 in the All-Ireland Senior Hurling Final.
- 24 September – Meath overcame the disappointment of the previous year's defeat to Galway, beating Cork by 1–9 (12) to 0–9 in the All-Ireland Senior Football Final.
- 19 November – Jimmy O'Connor scored the world's fastest hat-trick in a first-class association football match when he scored three goals in 2 minutes and 13 seconds for Shelbourne F.C. against Bohemian F.C. in a League of Ireland match at Dalymount Park.

== Births ==
=== January ===
- 12 January – Gary Kirby, Limerick hurler.
- 22 January – Eleanor McEvoy, singer songwriter.

=== February ===
- 6 February – Susan McKeown, folk singer.

=== March ===
- 1 March
  - Justin Benson, cricketer.
  - Ann Gallagher, Labour Party politician.
- 14 March – Willie O'Connor, Kilkenny hurler.
- 16 March – Terry Phelan, footballer born in England of Irish descent
- 17 March – Angus Dunlop, cricketer.

=== April ===
- 3 April – Liam Twomey, doctor, Fine Gael party teachta dála (TD), Senator.
- 20 April – Alan McLoughlin, footballer born in England of Irish descent (died 2021).
- 25 April – Alan Kernaghan, footballer born in England of Irish descent.

=== May ===
- 6 May –John Fitzgibbon, Cork hurler.
- 16 May – Barry Andrews, Fianna Fáil politician, TD for Dún Laoghaire.
- 19 May – Geraldine Somerville, actress.
- 26 May – Philip Treacy, hat designer.

=== July ===
- July – Anne Marie Forrest, author.
- 6 July – Mark Foley, Cork hurler.

=== September ===
- 4 September – Cathal Casey, Cork hurler.
- 12 September – Kieran McGuckin, Cork hurler.

=== October ===
- 15 October – Lawrence Roche, road racing cyclist.

=== December ===
- 13 December – Noel Fitzpatrick, veterinary surgeon.

=== Date unknown ===
- Tina Kellegher, actress
- Brian Smyth, painter.
- Enda Walsh, playwright.

== Deaths ==
=== January ===
- 1 January – Séamus Burke, Sinn Féin party TD, a founder-member of the Cumann na nGaedheal party and later of the Fine Gael party (born 1893).
- 28 January – Helena Molony, fought in the 1916 Easter Rising and first woman president of the Irish Trades Union Congress (born 1884).

=== March ===
- 10 March – Ina Boyle, composer (born 1889).
- 16 March – Thomas MacGreevy, poet and director of the National Gallery of Ireland (born 1893).

=== April ===
- 12 April – Sam English, association football player (born 1908).
- 22 April – Walter Macken, novelist, dramatist and actor (born 1915).

=== August ===
- 4 August – Edmond Pery, 5th Earl of Limerick, peer and soldier (born 1888).

=== September ===
- 14 September – Rupert Edward Cecil Lee Guinness, 2nd Earl of Iveagh, businessman, politician and philanthropist, Chancellor of the University of Dublin (born 1874).

=== November ===
- November – Edward Richards-Orpen, furniture maker and independent member of Seanad Éireann (born 1884).
- 30 November – Patrick Kavanagh, poet and novelist (born 1904).

=== December ===
- 18 December – James Everett, Labour Party TD, Cabinet minister (born 1894).
- 18 December – Florence O'Donoghue, historian and Irish Republican Army intelligence officer (born 1894).
- 28 December – John Joe O'Reilly, Cumann na nGaedheal party and Fine Gael party TD (born 1881).

=== Date unknown ===
- Mary Devenport O'Neill, poet and dramatist (born 1879).

== See also ==
- 1967 in Irish television
