= John McCaffrey (fundraiser) =

John McCaffrey (born Apr 1968) is a fundraising professional. He is currently (2024) President of the Galileo Foundation, an organisation he founded in 2016 to support the work of the Pontifical Academies of Sciences and Social Sciences and Pope Francis' leadership in the areas of modern slavery and human trafficking, climate change and poverty.

He was briefly (July 2012 – Dec 2013) the Commercial Director of Labour Party's with a remit to increase party fundraising.

== Career ==
McCaffrey was born in 1968 in Northern Ireland, and is a graduate of Saint MacNissi's College, Garron Tower in County Antrim and Selwyn College, Cambridge (1986–90) where he read Law and History.

He has worked for the Victoria and Albert Museum as Director of Development from 2002 to 2005, as a consultant to the Royal National Institute for Deaf People from 2005 to 2006, and the National Museums of Scotland. He also established the University of Ulster's first Development Office in Belfast in 1993 and has worked for Guinness plc (now Diageo) as PR and as a director in Belfast of ABSA (now Arts and Business). His client list has included the Catholic Bishops' Conference of England and Wales, Edinburgh College of Art, the Vatican Museums (of which he is a UK trustee), The Rosslyn Chapel, Worth Abbey and the World Monuments Fund (GB) amongst others. The Irish Episcopal Conference retained McCaffrey as their fundraising advisor for the International Eucharistic Congress which took place in Dublin in 2012. In 2010, he was the principal fundraising advisor for the Papal visit to the United Kingdom in September 2010. £6.5 million was raised towards the cost of the Papal Visit in 7 months.

While working for Cambridge University, he played a major part in securing the UK's largest ever charitable gift, $230M given by the Gates Foundation to Cambridge University in 1999. He claims to have been involved in the first visit to Northern Ireland by President Bill Clinton and subsequent visits by Hillary Rodham Clinton, and helped to organise the second Millennium Lecture in the White House by Professor Stephen Hawking, hosted by the Clintons.

In January 2014 he was appointed as Global Development Director of the Sydney-based George Institute for Global Health. In February 2015 he was appointed as fundraiser to the Pontifical Academy of Sciences in the Vatican.

== Honours ==
In May 2006, Pope Benedict XVI recognised his service to the Roman Catholic Church by bestowing the Order of St. Gregory the Great on McCaffrey, with the title Knight Commander. He first met the then Cardinal Ratzinger while a student at Cambridge in 1988, interviewing the future Pope for the student paper 'Varsity'. The interview also appeared in The Irish Times and The Universe. In 2005, McCaffrey was a commentator for Sky during the period spanning the death and funeral of Pope John Paul II and the election of Pope Benedict XVI. In May 2019 Pope Francis bestowed a promotion on McCaffrey to Knight Grand Cross of the Order of Saint Gregory, the highest rank given to a layperson, carrying with it the title 'Excellency'. He is a writer and photographer as well as a donor to various charitable causes, including the work of the Order of the Holy Sepulchre of Jerusalem, The Terrence Higgins Trust and Bethlehem University.
