= Ralph Grey, Baron Grey of Naunton =

British diplomat (1910–1999)

The Right Honourable The Lord Grey of Naunton GCMG GCVO OBE GCStJ
- Grey in 1959

Governor of Northern Ireland
- In office 3 December 1968 – 26 June 1973
- Monarch: Elizabeth II
- Preceded by: The Lord Erskine of Rerrick
- Succeeded by: Office abolished

Governor of the Bahamas
- In office 3 June 1964 – 1 November 1968
- Monarch: Elizabeth II
- Preceded by: Sir Robert Stapledon
- Succeeded by: The Lord Thurlow

Governor of British Guiana
- In office 22 December 1958 – 7 March 1964
- Monarch: Elizabeth II
- Preceded by: Sir Patrick Muir Renison
- Succeeded by: Sir Richard Luyt

Member of the House of Lords Lord Temporal
- In office 17 September 1968 – 17 October 1999; Life Peerage

Personal details
- Born: 15 April 1910 Wellington, New Zealand
- Died: 17 October 1999 (aged 89) Naunton, Gloucestershire, UK

Ralph Francis Alnwick Grey, Baron Grey of Naunton, GCMG, GCVO, OBE, GCStJ (15 April 1910 – 17 October 1999) was a New Zealand peer who served as the last Governor of Northern Ireland. He was created a life peer as Baron Grey of Naunton on 17 September 1968.

== Early life and education ==
Ralph Grey was born in Wellington, New Zealand, on 15 April 1910 the only son of Francis Arthur Grey and Mary Wilks Spencer.

He attended both Scots College and Wellington College before going up to University College, Auckland where he graduating as LLB. He then pursued postgraduate studies at Pembroke College, Cambridge and thereafter was called to the Bar.

== Career ==
=== Early career ===
Grey began his legal career as a clerk before practising as a barrister. He was appointed a Solicitor of the Supreme Court of New Zealand in 1932.

He joined the Colonial Administrative Service in 1936, as a probationer.

=== Nigeria ===
The following year he was an administrative service cadet at Lagos in Nigeria.

After World War II, he was promoted Assistant Financial Secretary in 1949. Two years later, he was an Administrative Officer First Class, quickly moving up to Deputy Secretary.

He was Secretary to the Governor-General and General Council of Ministers in 1954, and Chief Secretary of the Federation the following year. Two years later he was raised up as Deputy Governor-General until just before independence in 1959.

Governor of Northern Ireland's banner

=== West Indies ===
Grey was transferred to British Guiana as Governor and Commander-in-Chief for five years. As befitted a Governor he was promoted to Knight Grand Cross of the Order of Saint Michael and Saint George (GCMG) in the 1964 New Year Honours. Grey became Governor of the Bahamas in 1964. A 1965 Order deemed the Governor of the Bahamas to also be the Governor of the Turks and Caicos Islands. Grey remained in both posts until 1968.

=== Northern Ireland ===
That year Grey became Governor of Northern Ireland during the period of civil rights marches and increasing levels of street violence. The IRA announced a 'bombing campaign' against British rule which reached new intensity in 1971–72. In the depths of an economic recession, local government was suspended; Northern Ireland was subjected to Direct Rule from Westminster, and Lord Grey of Naunton was recalled. During the same period he was President of the Scout Council of Northern Ireland. From 1970 Grey was appointed Chairman of the Chartered Institute of Secretaries of Northern Ireland, supporting industry as an Honorary Member of the Chambers of Commerce and Honorary President of the Lisburn Chamber of Commerce. From 1970 he was also an Honorary Bencher of the Inns of Court for Northern Ireland.

Lord Grey of Naunton was the last Governor of Northern Ireland until 1973, having been appointed on 11 November 1968. He took office on 3 December 1968. When the post was abolished in 1973, he was promoted Knight Grand Cross of the Royal Victorian Order (GCVO) in the 1973 Birthday Honours. At the same time, he was Knight Commander of Ards, then Bailiff of Egle from 1975, until appointment as Lord Prior of the Most Venerable Order of the Hospital of Saint John of Jerusalem (1988–91).

== Memberships ==
Grey was a Council member of Cheltenham Ladies College, where his daughter, Amanda, was educated.

As well as regional commitments to Lloyds Bank, he served on its board in Bristol during 1970s. Lord Grey served as Chairman of the Central Council of the Royal Overseas League (1976–81). He was Chancellor of the New University of Ulster from 1980, and then from 1984 to 1993, he was Chancellor of the University of Ulster.

In retirement, Grey was invited to be admitted to Gray's Inn. He was Grand President of the Royal Overseas League in 1993, Chairman of its General Council, but had been president since 1981.

== Honours and awards ==
Grey was appointed an Officer of the Most Excellent Order of the British Empire (OBE) in the 1951 Birthday Honours.

In the 1955 Birthday Honours, he was appointed a Companion of the Most Distinguished Order of Saint Michael and Saint George (CMG), promoted to Knight Commander (KCMG) in the 1959 New Year Honours, and again to Knight Grand Cross (GCMG) in the 1964 New Year Honours.

He was appointed a Knight Commander of the Royal Victorian Order (KCVO) in 1956, and promoted to Knight Grand Cross (GCVO) in the 1973 Birthday Honours.

Grey received an honorary doctorate from the National University of Ireland (the NUI) in 1985 and Honorary doctorates of Literature and Science by the University of Ulster.

== Personal life ==
In 1944 he married Esme Mae, daughter of Albert Victor Kerry Burcher, of Remuera, Auckland (and widow of Pilot Officer Kenneth Kirkaldie, REFVR). Lady Grey of Naunton, died on 22 March 1996. The couple had three children:

- The Hon. Jolyon Kenneth Alnwick Grey (b.1946)
- The Hon. Jeremy Francis Alnwick Grey (b.1948)
- The Hon. Amanda Mary Alnwick Grey (b.1950).

The Grey family lived in Gloucestershire among the rolling Cotswold hills at Overbrook in the village of Naunton, which provided the territorial designation of his peerage title.

== Death ==
Baron Grey died on 17 October 1999 in Naunton.

== Arms ==
Coat of arms of Ralph Grey, Baron Grey of Naunton
Crest A sheathed Sword erect Gules, garnished hilt and pommel Or, each Quillion ending in a Kiwi's Head erased Or, the Scabbard supported by two Lions' gambs erased Gules, winged Azure, semy of Bees volant Or Escutcheon Bendy Argent and Azure, two Lions' faces in pale, issuing from either flank of the shield a Cross Formy flory dimidiated Gules Supporters Dexter: a Lion Or; Sinister: a crested Crane Proper, each gorged with an Ancient Crown, flowing therefrom a Mantle Gules lined Vair Motto Servir de mon gre (Serving with goodwill) Orders The Order of St Michael and St George circlet: Auspicium Melioris Ævi; The Badge of the Order of St John: Maltese Cross.

Government offices
Preceded by Sir Patrick Renison	Governor of British Guiana; 1958–1964	Succeeded by Sir Richard Luyt
Preceded by Sir Robert Stapeldon de Stapledon	Governor of the Bahamas; 1964–1968	Succeeded by The Hon. Sir Francis Cumming-Bruce
Preceded by The Lord Erskine of Rerrick	Governor of Northern Ireland; 1968–1973	Succeeded by Office abolished
Other offices
Preceded by The Earl Cathcart	Lord Prior of St John; 1988–1990	Succeeded by The Lord Vestey
