= Short SC.1 =

British experimental VTOL aircraft

SC.1
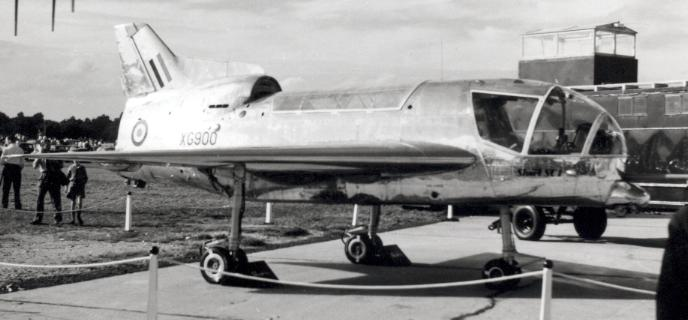
- Short SC.1 XG900 at Farnborough SBAC Show September 1958

General information
- Type: Experimental aircraft
- National origin: United Kingdom
- Manufacturer: Short Brothers
- Status: Retired and preserved
- Primary user: Royal Aircraft Establishment
- Number built: 2

History
- First flight: 2 April 1957 (CTOL); 26 May 1958 (VTOL)
- Retired: 1971

The Short SC.1 was the first British fixed-wing vertical take-off and landing (VTOL) jet aircraft. It was developed by Short Brothers. It was powered by an arrangement of five Rolls-Royce RB.108 turbojets, four of which were used for vertical flight and one for conventional horizontal flight. The SC.1 had the distinction of being the first British fixed-wing VTOL aircraft and the first one to transition between vertical and horizontal flight modes; it was also the first VTOL-capable aircraft with a fly-by-wire control system.

The SC.1 was designed and produced in response to a Ministry of Supply (MoS) requirement for a suitable aircraft for conducting flight studies into VTOL flight, as well as specifically into the transition between vertical and horizontal flight. Two prototypes were used for flight testing between 1957 and 1971. Research data from the SC.1 test programme contributed to the development of the Hawker Siddeley P.1127 and the subsequent Hawker Siddeley Harrier, the first operational VTOL aircraft.

In October 2012, the Short SC.1 received Northern Ireland's first Engineering Heritage Award as a recognition of its significant achievement in the engineering field.

== Development ==
During the 1940s, various nations became interested in developing viable aircraft capable of vertical take-offs and landings (VTOL). During the 1950s, Britain had flight-tested the purpose-built Rolls-Royce Thrust Measuring Rig, a crude but pioneering VTOL aircraft that successfully flew as envisioned, demonstrating the viability of the concept as well as providing useful data to build upon. However, while the Thrust Measuring Rig had provided valuable insight for designing VTOL aircraft, such as the requirement for an auto-stabilisation system, it suffered from some deficiencies that undermined its value as a platform for further detailed research, such as control lag and a lack of aerodynamic surfaces. There was a need for an aircraft that would exploit the experience gained from the Thrust Measuring Rig, and to explore areas beyond its limited capability.

The SC.1 has its origins in a submission by Short Brothers to meet a Ministry of Supply (MoS) request for tender (ER.143T) for a vertical take-off research aircraft, which had been issued in September 1953. On 15 October 1954, the proposed design was accepted by the Ministry and a contract was promptly placed for two aircraft to meet Specification ER.143D. As envisioned, the aircraft was to be used for a series of flight tests to investigate its behaviour during the transition between vertical and horizontal flight modes, to determine the optimum and minimum level of assistance required from the auto-stabiliser during the transition process, to uncover likely operational issues, and to develop related support aids and equipment for the pilot to develop an all-weather approach and landing system.

Short constructed two prototypes, designated XG900 and XG905.

== Design ==
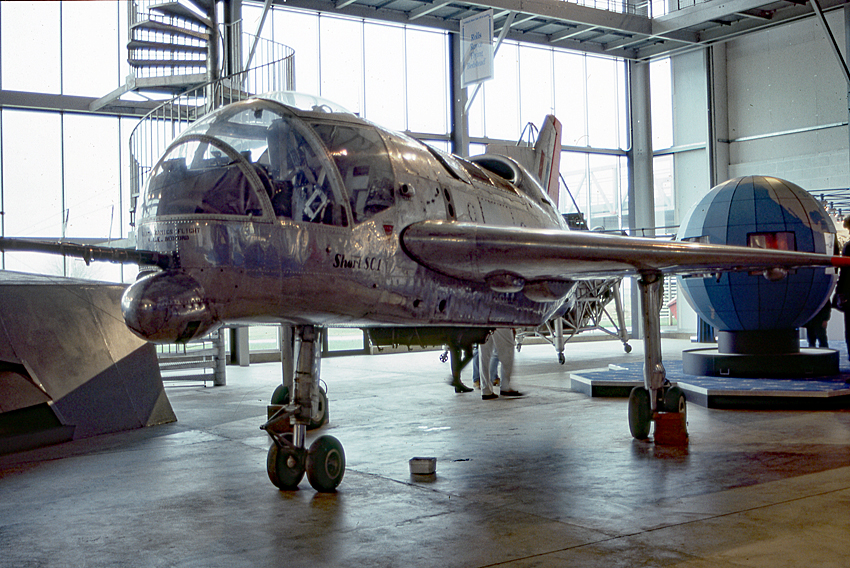
Short SC1 XG900 prototype at Yeovilton

The Short SC.1 was a single-seat low wing tailless delta wing aircraft of approximately 8,000 lb all-up weight (max. 7,700 lb for vertical flight). It was powered by four vertically mounted, lightweight Rolls-Royce RB.108 lift engines that provided a total vertical thrust of 8,600 lb, along with a single RB.108 cruise engine in the rear of the aircraft to provide thrust for forward flight. The lift engines were mounted vertically in side-by-side pairs in a central bay so that their resultant thrust line passed close to the centre of gravity of the aircraft. These pairs of engines could be swivelled fore-and-aft to produce vectored thrust for acceleration/deceleration along the aircraft's longitudinal axis.

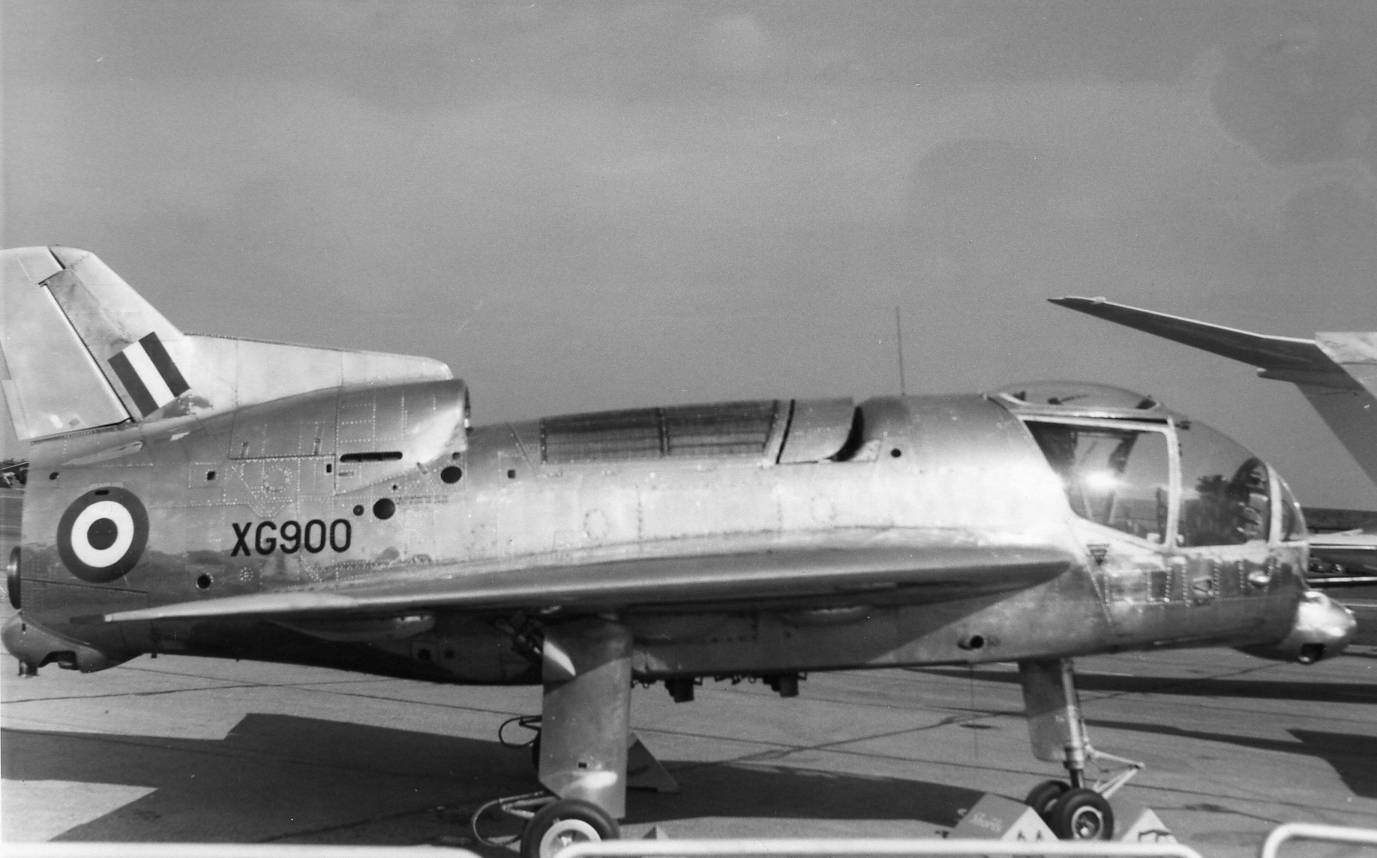
XG900 Short SC.1 at the SBAC show in 1961, showing the oleo leg fairings and the lift engine automatic inlet louvres added in mid-1960

During conventional flight, the lift engines would be shut down; before beginning the transition from horizontal to vertical flight, they would be started using compressed air from the single cruise engine. The compressed air provided the initial rotation of the engine but a pressure drop from intake to exhaust had to be present also as the compressed air alone was not adequate for reaching idle speed. Considerable wind-tunnel and flight development of the air intake was required because at the start of transition from horizontal flight vertically mounted engines have to tolerate a crosswind equal to the forward flight speed without surging or excessive vibrations. The required uniformity of flow was achieved with the help of a set of 7 hinged gills which opened to a forward-facing position to direct air into a plenum which supplied the engines. The behaviour of a vertically mounted RB.108 in terms of re-ingestion and ground erosion had been investigated with an installation representative of that intended for the SC.1 during ground operation in a Meteor at Hucknall Aerodrome. Initially, a series of scuttles were fitted to the exit nozzles of the lift engines to maintain a low-pressure environment beneath the engines to ensure that the engine rotor would be "windmilling" in the correct direction prior to supplying the compressed air for starting; due to the effectiveness of intake and engine design changes, the scuttles became unnecessary.

The cockpit layout was mainly conventional, but complicated by the large number of systems the pilot had to monitor. For its role as a research aircraft it had comprehensive recording equipment.

The common throttle lever for the four vertical lift engines was the only additional primary control in the cockpit; it was operated in a similar manner to that of the Collective pitch level of a rotorcraft. Two ways to control the attitude of the aircraft were required depending on its forward speed; aerodynamic surfaces were used during conventional flight, and air-jet nozzles for transitioning from horizontal flight, hovering and vertical flight. Bleed air from the four lift engines (approximately 10 per cent of the intake airflow) was supplied to the variable nose, tail and wing tip nozzles, for pitch, roll and yaw control at low speeds during which there would be insufficient airflow over the aerodynamic surfaces for conventional controls to be effective.

The SC.1 was also equipped with the first "fly-by-wire" control system to be fitted to a VTOL aircraft. This electrically signalled control system, which also comprised the auto-stabiliser, not only transferred signals from cockpit controls such as the position of the stick, but also monitored feedback signals from the servos to provide stability of the systems itself. A total of three modes of control for the aerodynamic surfaces and/or the nozzle controls were permitted by the system:

1. Aerodynamic surfaces and air-jet nozzles controlled electrically via three independent servo-motors (with "three-way parallel" or "triplex" fail-safe operation) in conjunction with three autostabilizer control systems ("full fly-by-wire")
2. Hybrid-mode, in which the nozzles were controlled by servo/autostabilizer and the aerodynamic surfaces were linked directly to the manual controls
3. Direct mode, in which all controls were linked to the control stick

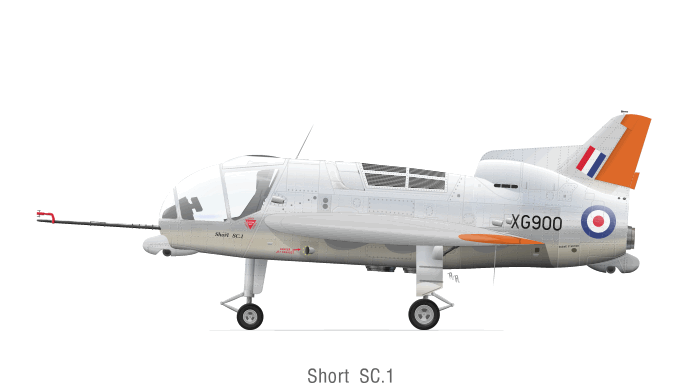
XG900 Short SC.1 colour profile

Modes 1 and 2 were selected on the ground; whenever the autostabilizer was in use, the pilot had an emergency override lever available with which to revert to direct control mode in flight. The outputs from the three control systems were compared and a "majority rule" enforced, ensuring that a failure in a single system was overridden by the other two (presumably correct) systems. Any failure in a "fly-by-wire" pathway was indicated to the pilot as a warning, which he could either choose to ignore or respond to by switching to direct (manual) control.

In common with other VTOL aircraft, the Short SC.1 suffered from vertical thrust loss due to the ground effect. Research into this performed on scale models suggested that for the SC.1 these losses would be between 15 per cent and 20 per cent at undercarriage height. Fuel tanks were located along the wing leading edges and in "bag" tanks fitted between the main wing spars. The SC.1 was fitted with a tricycle undercarriage arrangement; while non-retracting, the landing gear could be set between two alternative positions, suited to either conventional and vertical landings. The fixed undercarriage legs were designed specifically for vertical flight; each leg carried a pair of heat-resistant castoring wheels, while the rear undercarriage was also fitted with disc brakes. Long-stroke oleos were used to cushion vertical landings. The robust gear was able to withstand a descent rate of 18 ft (5.5m) per second.

== Testing ==
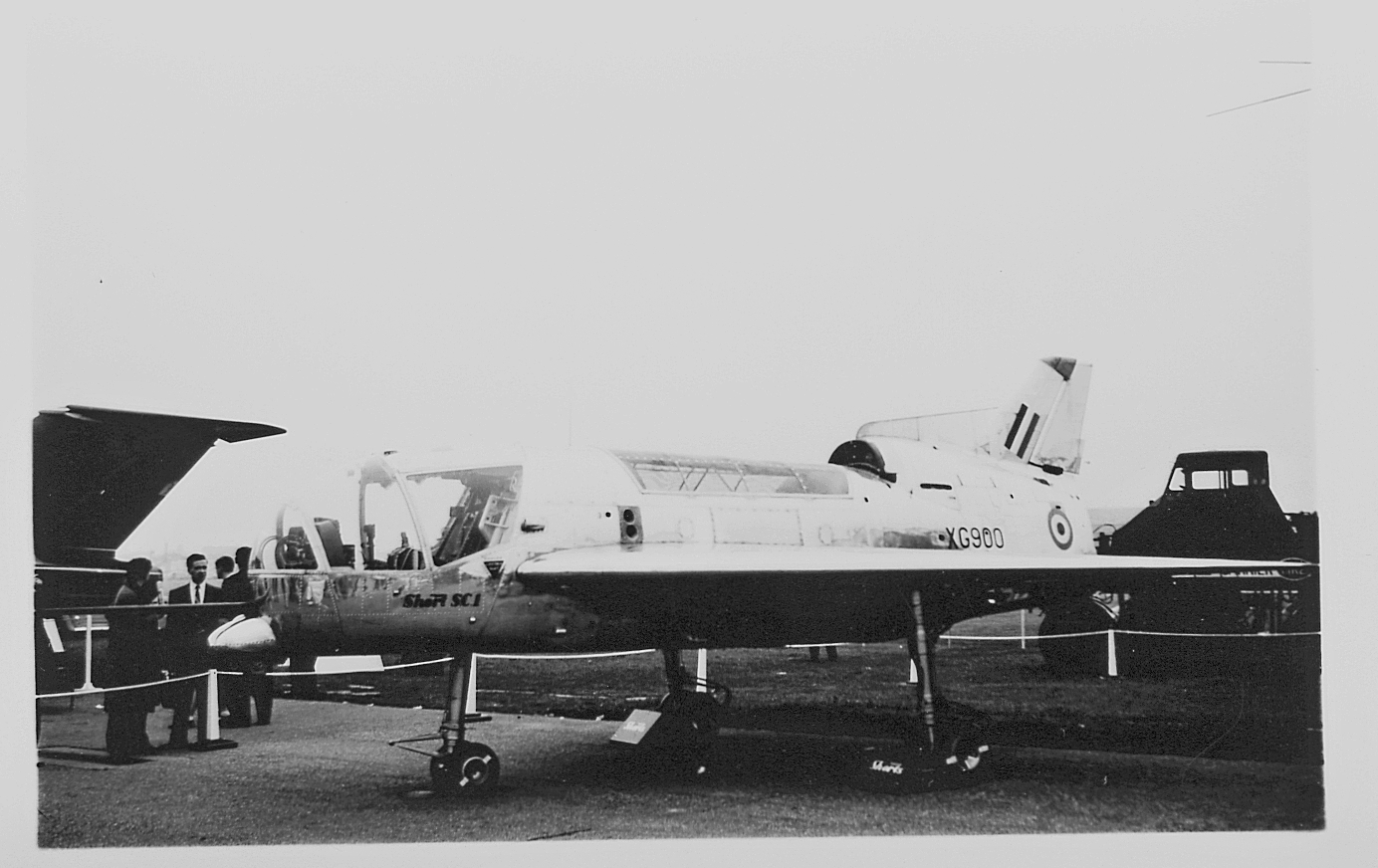
The first Short SC.1, XG900, at the 1958 SBAC show at Farnborough

Constructed at Short's Belfast factory in Northern Ireland, the first SC.1 prototype, XG900, first undertook initial engine runs at this facility. After being transported by sea to England, XG900, which was initially fitted only with the propulsion engine, was delivered to the Royal Aircraft Establishment (RAE) at Boscombe Down to begin the flight test programme. On 2 April 1957, the prototype conducted the type's maiden flight, which was also its first conventional takeoff and landing (CTOL) flight.

Just over a year later, on 26 May 1958, the second prototype made the first tethered vertical flight. Initial flights of the type were performed while attached to a specially devised gantry, which accommodated only a limited amount of freedom, up to 15 ft vertically and 10 ft off-centre in any direction, vertical velocity was also restricted to less than 10 ft/second; progressive arresting of the aircraft occurred beyond these limitation. It would take off from a grid platform positioned 6 ft above the ground itself in order to circumvent the ground effect phenomenon; considerable effort on the part of Shorts had been made during development of a suitable platform to eliminate the negative impact of ground effect and was redesigned several times. The gantry facility was used for ab initio training and familiarisation purposes for the first 8 pilots to fly the SC.1.

On 25 October of that year, the type performed the first 'free' vertical flight. On 6 April 1960, the first in-flight transition between vertical and horizontal flight was successfully conducted. While successful at transitioning between the two modes, the Short SC.1 had a reputation as being somewhat ungainly as an aircraft.

The SC.1 was publicly displayed at the Farnborough Airshow in 1958 and 1960; it also appeared at the Paris Air Show in 1961, at which it performed a demonstration flight. On 2 October 1963, the second test aircraft crashed in Belfast, killing the pilot, J.R. Green; the cause was later determined to have been a control malfunction. Following the accident, the aircraft was rebuilt and returned to flight for further testing, both continued flying until 1967. By 1965, a total of 14 different pilots had flown the type.

As a result of ground suitability tests, it was determined that conventional runway concrete, pavement, and even grass strips would be adequate for vertical takeoff and landing of the SC.1; however, debris that may be forced out from imperfect surfaces would pose a risk to personnel but not to the aircraft itself. The test programme also allowed experience upon the maintenance and serviceability of a VTOL aircraft to be acquired, even though these were not primary objectives of the design nor the research effort; throughout the programme, an overall average of 2.6 flights were performed per week. While numerous errors with the auto-stabiliser were reported during flights, no fault ever occurred that endangered the aircraft or had any effect upon its control.

Testing found significant difficulty in measuring actual engine thrust, leading to further tests using improved intakes and instrumentation. Ultimately, the engines proved to be far less problematic than might have been expected considering the experimental nature of the aircraft and its power-plants; and when faults occurred in the triplex auto-stabiliser they were easy to locate, in part due to the system's self-checking nature. According to a Ministry of Aviation report, the SC.1 was determined to have been an effective research vehicle when operated within the limits imposed by its small size and restricted capacity; however it was found that a larger aircraft would be necessary for more extensive tests of the instruments and guidance equipment.

The SC.1 flew for over ten years, during which it provided a great deal of data that served to influence later design concepts such as the "puffer jet" controls on the Hawker Siddeley P.1127, the precursor of the Hawker Siddeley Harrier. The flight testing work relating to vertical takeoff and landing techniques and technologies also proved to be invaluable, and helped further Britain's lead in the field. The Short SC.1 was ultimately rendered obsolete by the emerging Harrier which, amongst other things, proved that it was unnecessary to carry an additional four engines solely for the purposes of lift-off and landing.

== Aircraft on display ==
The first SC-1 (XG900) became a part of the Science Museum's aircraft collection at South Kensington, London.

The second SC-1 (XG905) was also preserved and is on static display at the Flight Experience exhibit at the Ulster Folk and Transport Museum, Cultra, Northern Ireland.

== Operators ==
United Kingdom

- Royal Aircraft Establishment

== Specifications ==
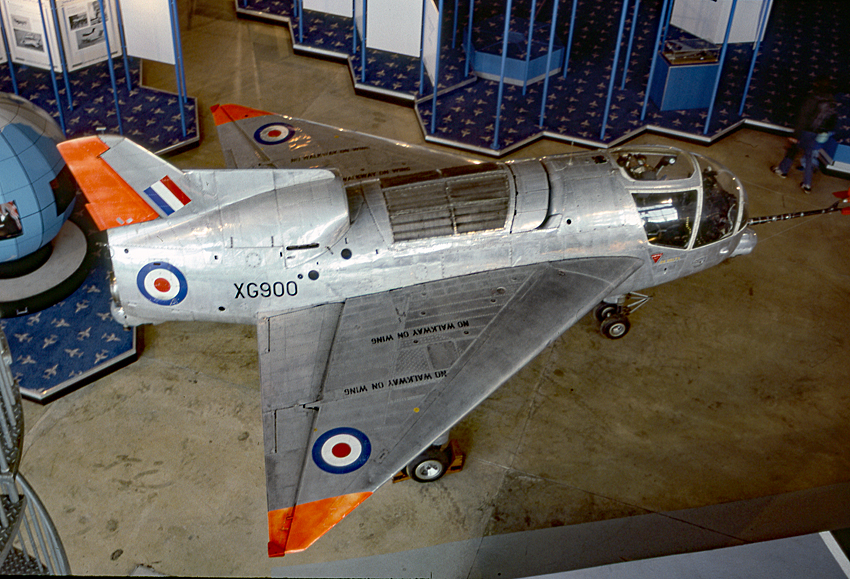
Short SC1 XG900 at Yeovilton. Note the air intake at the base of the tail for the RB.108 cruise engine, as well as the grill above the centre fuselage bay housing the vertical lift engines

Data from Shorts Aircraft since 1900, Ministry of Aviation

General characteristics

- Crew: 1
- Length: 25 ft 6 in (7.77 m)
- Wingspan: 23 ft 6 in (7.16 m)
- Height: 10 ft 8 in (3.25 m)
- Wing area: 211.5 sq ft (19.65 m^{2})
- Aspect ratio: 2.61:1
- Airfoil: NACA 0010
- Empty weight: 6,260 lb (2,839 kg)
- Gross weight: 7,700 lb (3,493 kg) (VTOL operations)
- Max takeoff weight: 8,050 lb (3,651 kg) (CTOL operations)
- Powerplant: 1 × Rolls-Royce RB.108 turbojet, 2,130 lbf (9.5 kN) thrust (forward flight)
- Powerplant: 4 × Rolls-Royce RB.108 turbojets, 2,130 lbf (9.5 kN) thrust each (lift engines)

Performance

- Maximum speed: 246 mph (396 km/h, 214 kn)
- Range: 150 mi (240 km, 130 nmi)
- Service ceiling: 8,000 ft (2,400 m)
- Rate of climb: 700 ft/min (3.6 m/s)
- Wing loading: 38.1 lb/sq ft (186 kg/m^{2})
- Thrust/weight:
  - (CTOL): 0.265
  - (VTOL): 1.11

== See also ==
Aircraft of comparable role, configuration, and era

- Rolls-Royce Thrust Measuring Rig

Related lists

- List of experimental aircraft
