= Sam Thompson (writer) =

British novelist (born 1978)

Sam Thompson (born 1978) is a British novelist.

His novel Communion Town was longlisted for the 2012 Man Booker Prize as one of top 12 novels chosen, but was not shortlisted. He published a second book, Jott, in 2018.

Thompson has also written several children's novels, including Wolfstongue (2021), The Fox's Tower (2022), and The Forest Yet to Come (2025).
