= John Erskine, 1st Baron Erskine of Rerrick =

The Right Honourable The Lord Erskine of Rerrick GBE KStJ JP DL FRSE

Governor of Northern Ireland
- In office 3 December 1964 – 3 December 1968
- Monarch: Elizabeth II
- Preceded by: The Lord Wakehurst
- Succeeded by: The Lord Grey of Naunton

Personal details
- Born: John Maxwell Erskine; 14 December 1893
- Died: 14 December 1980 (aged 87)

Flag of the governor of Northern Ireland

John Maxwell Erskine, 1st Baron Erskine of Rerrick, GBE, KStJ, JP, DL, FRSE (14 December 1893 – 14 December 1980) was a Scottish banker. He served as Governor of Northern Ireland from 1964 to 1968.

== Life ==
Lord Erskine was born in Kirkcudbright, the son of John and Maryanne Erskine, and was educated at Kirkcudbright Academy.

He was General Manager of the Commercial Bank of Scotland from 1932 to 1953, and a director from 1951 to 1969. From 1937 to 1940 he was President of the Institute of Bankers in Scotland. In 1933 he was elected a Fellow of the Royal Society of Scotland. His proposers were James Watt, Robert Grant, Sir Thomas Barnby Whitson, and Ralph Allan Sampson.

He was knighted in the 1949 Birthday Honours, created a baronet in the 1961 Birthday Honours and created a Baron in 1964.

=== Governor of Northern Ireland ===
Lord Erskine was appointed as Governor by the Queen in December 1964 on the recommendation of the Northern Irish Prime Minister, Terence O'Neill. Erskine's Scottish Presbyterianism played a role in his appointment as Governor as the Prime Minister, despite being an Anglican, wanted to represent the majority Presbyterian population. His experience in the Joint Exchequer Board, which governed the relationship between the Northern Irish Ministry for Finance and the British Treasury was also considered beneficial to the Province, whose finances faced strict financial scrutiny by Westminster. It was expected that his role would be purely representational, unlike a colonial governor in the Empire. However the increasing tensions in Northern Ireland inevitably saw Lord Erskine face scrutiny. One year after his appointment, in 1965, he faced anger from the Reverend Ian Paisley for his support of the Prime Ministers meetings with the Irish Taoiseach. Furthermore, in 1966, the Governor and Lady Erskine were heckled and jostled leaving the Presbyterian General Assembly in Belfast by marchers led Paisley, who was protesting the Church's supposed "Romanizing tendencies". In the same year he also became mired in controversy after suggesting to the Belfast Corporation that a new bridge across the river Lagan be named the "Queen Elizabeth II Bridge" instead of the unionist led Corporation's preferred "Sir Edward Carson Bridge". The Corporation agreed to this, while condemning him for involvement in a political affair. This further enraged sections of the unionist community, with the Reverend Paisley demanding his resignation.

The Governor also hosted the Queen who visited Northern Ireland in 1966 to open the bridge named after her. Erskine resigned in 1968, as the Province was descending into rioting and unrest between the Unionist and Nationalist communities. He was replaced by Lord Grey of Naunton.

== Family ==
He married Henrietta Dunnett in 1922 and they had one son and one daughter. His son Iain Maxwell Erskine succeeded him as 2nd Baron Erskine of Rerrick.

== Sources ==
The International Who's Who, 1980–81

Political offices
Preceded by Lord Wakehurst	Governor of Northern Ireland; 1964–1968	Succeeded by Lord Grey of Naunton
Peerage of the United Kingdom
New creation	Baron Erskine of Rerrick; 1964–1980	Succeeded by Iain Maxwell Erskine
Baronetage of the United Kingdom
New creation	Baronet (of Rerrick); 1961–1980	Succeeded by Iain Maxwell Erskine
