= 1960s in Irish television =

For articles on Irish television in the 1960s please see:

- 1960 in Irish television
- 1961 in Irish television
- 1962 in Irish television
- 1963 in Irish television
- 1964 in Irish television
- 1965 in Irish television
- 1966 in Irish television
- 1967 in Irish television
- 1968 in Irish television
- 1969 in Irish television
