= Digital terrestrial television in the Republic of Ireland =

The deployment of digital terrestrial television in Ireland has taken some time, with the first small tests being carried out in 1998. 2002 saw the cancellation and non-award of the DTT commercial licence and transmission network sale. In August 2006, a major regional DTT trial began in conjunction with major television channels in Ireland including Raidió Teilifís Éireann, TV3, TG4 and the now-defunct Channel 6. By 2008 the Broadcasting Authority of Ireland announced that three groups had come together with proposals to manage commercial DTT in Ireland.

== Historical testing ==
DVB-T was repeatedly tested from RTÉ Network Limited's Three Rock Mountain transmitter, with relatively long tests in 1998 and 2001, and shorter tests in 2004, with a single multiplex carrying the four Irish analogue terrestrial channels, and Tara Television while it was in existence, on both UHF (channel 26) and VHF (channel D). These were under temporary licences for testing, which are regularly awarded.

A contract to run a nationwide system, with six multiplexes from main sites and four from relay sites, was awarded in 2001 to ITS Digital Limited, trading as "It's TV" and led by former RTÉ executive Peter Branagan, who intended to launch a pay TV and broadband service. ITS wanted to offer broadband internet access using the DVB-RCT standard (which, while providing 30 Mbit/s, did not provide sufficient reverse link capacity for 20,000 people on one mast). ITS did not have a broadband licence and no viable business plan without selling broadband, and due to lack of funding withdrew its application in October 2002.

The government also planned to privatise RTÉ's transmission network at this time but this too failed in October 2002 following the withdrawal of ITS Digital Limited DTT licence application and a number of other factors.

== National digital terrestrial plan ==
Ireland currently uses the DVB-T standard with MPEG-4 compression. MHEG-5 is also used for epg and interactive services. The Broadcasting (Amendment) Act 2007 assigned one multiplex to RTÉ to ensure the continued availability of the four former free-to-air services in Ireland – that is, RTÉ 1, RTÉ 2, TG4 and TV3. RTÉ then established and now runs this DTT multiplex independently of BAI-licensed multiplexes in fulfilment of its public-service obligations. Under the 2007 Act, the BAI is required to license commercial DTT in the State. In the first instance, the BAI sought to license three DTT multiplex operators for the establishment, maintenance and roll-out of commercial DTT in Ireland. Afterwards one further multiplex was assigned to RTÉ and one multiplex to the BAI for licensing. A public DTT Information Campaign took place from March 2009 until the full digital switchover was completed on 24 October 2012.

== 2008 multiplex licensing ==
The Authority engaged in two phases of targeted consultation to assist in the development of its DTT Multiplex Licensing Policy. These consultations ran from May to December 2007 and involved the production of a comprehensive consultation document outlining policy proposals in relation to DTT licensing and the commissioning of independent research on DTT.

The BAI launched the commercial multiplex processes with a minimum of twenty-four channels specified. Interested parties submitted their applications as specified in ads in National Papers on Friday 7 March 2008.

The BAI's application process for the DTT multiplex contracts ran for a period of eight weeks. The application document sought a considerable amount of information including: proposals for programming; financial and business plan; the transmission/multiplexing proposals as well as details regarding the shareholding and management of the applicant group.

Nine applicants consisting of 3 bid consortiums for all 3 muxes made presentations to the Authority, which was open to the public at 1:30pm in the Westbury Hotel, Grafton Street, Dublin 2 on 12 May 2008 and the award of contract was offered to the most suitable bid team shortly after 21 July 2008 following evaluation by the BAI on the applications received.

The BAI on 21 July 2008 announced Boxer DTT Ltd trading as Boxer as the sole winner to operate the three commercial multiplexes. Boxer DTT Ltd was a consortium made up of Communicorp, Boxer TV Access in Sweden and BT Ireland. The award of the contracts was subject to clarifications and the successful outcome of contract negotiations.

In the 2008 perspective Boxer DTT Ireland proposed a tentative start date of January 2009, which was considered unrealistic. Standards chosen were MPEG4/H.264 and DVB-T. Boxer TV Access had a 50% holding in Boxer Ireland.

In April 2009 it was announced that Boxer had decided to decline the licence offered to the consortium. The BAI instead offered the licence to the runner up, Onevision.

At the end of April 2010 the negotiations with Onevision ended. In May 2010 the Contract was offered to Easy TV (the RTÉ / Liberty Global consortium. A DTT Information Campaign was announced by the Department of Communications, Energy & Natural Resources, to launch in March 2009 ahead of the September 2009 launch of Irish DTT. By October 2010, the information campaign had been launched in coincidence with Saorview launching its public testing phase. The Information Campaign was undertaken by the BAI, with support of the Department.

By of 30 October 2010 FTA DTT, known as Saorview, had launched following a direction from the Minister for Communications, Energy & Natural Resources, to RTÉ and signing of the RTÉ (National Television Multiplex) Order 2010 (S.I. No. 85 of 2010) on 26 February 2010. The rollout of FTA Saorview DTT then proceeded, but the commercial DTT competition was deferred indefinitely.

Easy TV considered its position on the licence offer which it was offered on 29 April 2010. The Easy TV consortium informed the BAI on 12 May 2010 that it was declining their offer to pursue negotiations regarding the Commercial DTT Multiplex Licence. RTÉ publicly confirmed on 14 May 2010 that Easy TV was "declining their offer to pursue negotiations" on the DTT contract. The BAI officially confirmed Easy TV's withdrawal and the conclusion of the current DTT licensing process on 18 May 2010. On 1 July 2010 RTÉ announced that Mary Curtis, RTÉ's then deputy head of TV programming, would take on the role of Director of Digital Switchover (DSO).

== Commercial DTT Licence Process Suspended ==
In August 2013 a report into Commercial DTT by Oliver & Ohlbaum was given to the BAI, the report outlined the main problems associated with DTT in Ireland including the lack of free-to-air services on Saorview. Based on this report the BAI have decided not to proceed with a licence competition for pay-DTT. The report was published on the BAI website in January 2014. On its publication Bob Collins, Chairperson of the BAI said “The contents of the report raise a number of policy implications for consideration by Government and also for the BAI, having regard to its statutory obligations and its enduring objectives in respect of diversity and plurality. In submitting copies of the review to the Minister for Communications, Energy and Natural Resources, the BAI would now welcome the opportunity to discuss the findings of the report and the policy implications arising at an early date.”

== Channels ==
=== Television ===
LCN	Channel	Saorview Multiplex	Resolution	Notes
1	RTÉ One	2RN Mux 2	HD (1080i)	Full-time
2	RTÉ2	2RN Mux 1	HD (1080i)	Full-time
3	Virgin Media 1	2RN Mux 1	SD (576i)	Commercial
4	TG4	2RN Mux 1	SD (576i)	Irish-language
5	Virgin Media 2	2RN Mux 1	SD (576i)	Commercial
6	Virgin Media 3	2RN Mux 2	SD (576i)	Commercial
7	Virgin Media 4	2RN Mux 2	SD (576i)	Commercial
8	Challenge	2RN Mux 2	SD (576i)	Commercial (United Kingdom channel)
11	RTÉ One +1	2RN Mux 2	SD (576i)	Timeshift
12	RTÉ2 +1	2RN Mux 2	SD (576i)	Timeshift 19:00–02:00, (Weekends 12:00–02:00)
17	RTÉ Junior	2RN Mux 2	SD (576i)	06:00–19:00 (Children's)
21	RTÉ News	2RN Mux 1	SD (576i)	Rolling news (20% live content/80% repeats)
22	Tithe an Oireachtais	2RN Mux 1	SD (576i)	Oireachtas and European Parliament proceedings
23	Sky News	2RN Mux 2	SD (576i)	Commercial, 24-hour news (United Kingdom channel)
29	Saorview Information	2RN Mux 2	SD (576i)	Saorview platform rolling information
Test service (no LCN)	Tástáil Innealtóireachta Ardghléine	2RN Mux 2	HD (1080i)	Test Card (captions "2rn" "Ath Cliath" and "Ardghleine")

- 9, 10, 13–16, 18–20, 24–28, 30–199: Numbers not currently used. In some areas the relevant UK Freeview services may appear here.
- 200-209: radio services
- 901 Upwards: reserved for legacy analogue tuners (where applicable)

Channels with no LCN are test services which are not visible on most receivers. There are also a large number of blank audio and data channels (again invisible on most receivers) which are presumably reserved for future services.

=== Radio ===
LCN	Service	Saorview Multiplex	Bitrate
200	RTÉ Radio 1	2RN Mux 1	128 kbit/s
201	RTÉ Radio 1 Extra	2RN Mux 1	128 kbit/s
202	RTÉ 2FM	2RN Mux 1	128 kbit/s
203	RTÉ Lyric	2RN Mux 1	160 kbit/s
204	RTÉ Raidió na Gaeltachta	2RN Mux 1	128 kbit/s
205	RTÉ Pulse	2RN Mux 1	112 kbit/s
206	RTÉ 2XM	2RN Mux 1	112 kbit/s
207	RTÉ Junior and RTÉ Chill (timeshare)	2RN Mux 1	112 kbit/s
208	RTÉ Gold	2RN Mux 1	112 kbit/s
210	Radio Maria Ireland	2RN Mux 2	unknown

- 209, 211 - 999: blank

== See also ==
- Television in Ireland
