= 1967 in Irish television =

The following is a list of events relating to television in Ireland from 1967.

== Events ==
- April – RTÉ Television abandons its plans to provide coverage of the Vietnam War following intervention from the Irish government.
- 16 July – The Irish language current affairs programme, Féach is first aired by RTÉ Television.
- 30 September – The children's programme Wanderly Wagon is first aired on television.

== Debuts ==
- 9 August – It's Too Late - We're On! (1967)
- 30 September – Wanderly Wagon (1967–1982)
- 20 November – Me and My Friend (1967–1968)

== Ongoing television programmes ==
- RTÉ News: Nine O'Clock (1961–present)
- Dáithí Lacha (1962–1969)
- RTÉ News: Six One (1962–present)
- The Late Late Show (1962–present)
- Tolka Row (1964–1968)
- Newsbeat (1964–1971)
- The Riordans (1965–1979)
- Quicksilver (1965–1981)
- Seven Days (1966–1976)

== Ending this year ==
- 20 September – It's Too Late - We're On! (1967)

== See also ==
- 1967 in Ireland
