= 1963 in Ireland =

- Centuries: 18th; 19th; 20th; 21st
- Decades: 1940s; 1950s; 1960s; 1970s; 1980s
- See also: 1963 in Northern Ireland; Other events of 1963; List of years in Ireland

Events in the year 1963 in Ireland.

== Incumbents ==
- President: Éamon de Valera
- Taoiseach: Seán Lemass (FF)
- Tánaiste: Seán MacEntee (FF)
- Minister for Finance: James Ryan (FF)
- Chief Justice: Cearbhall Ó Dálaigh
- Dáil: 17th
- Seanad: 10th

== Events ==
- 24 January – The Minister for Justice, Charles Haughey, announced that the government proposed to abolish the death penalty.
- 29 January – A new control tower opened at Shannon Airport.
- 4 March – The Labour Court met to try to break the deadlock in a strike by 30 Radio Éireann and Telefís Éireann journalists which arose from a claim for increased salaries and improved conditions by the journalists.
- 25 March – The Lord Mayor of Dublin, Jim "J.J." O'Keeffe, inaugurated Ireland's first escalator, in Roches Stores, a department store on Henry Street in Dublin. The first working escalator was built in New York City in 1896.
- 20 May – The Minister for Education, Patrick Hillery, announced plans for comprehensive schools and regional technical colleges.
- 3 June – The national television channel, Telefís Éireann, closed down immediately after its 9 pm news bulletin as a mark of respect following the death of Pope John XXIII.

=== Visit by John F Kennedy ===
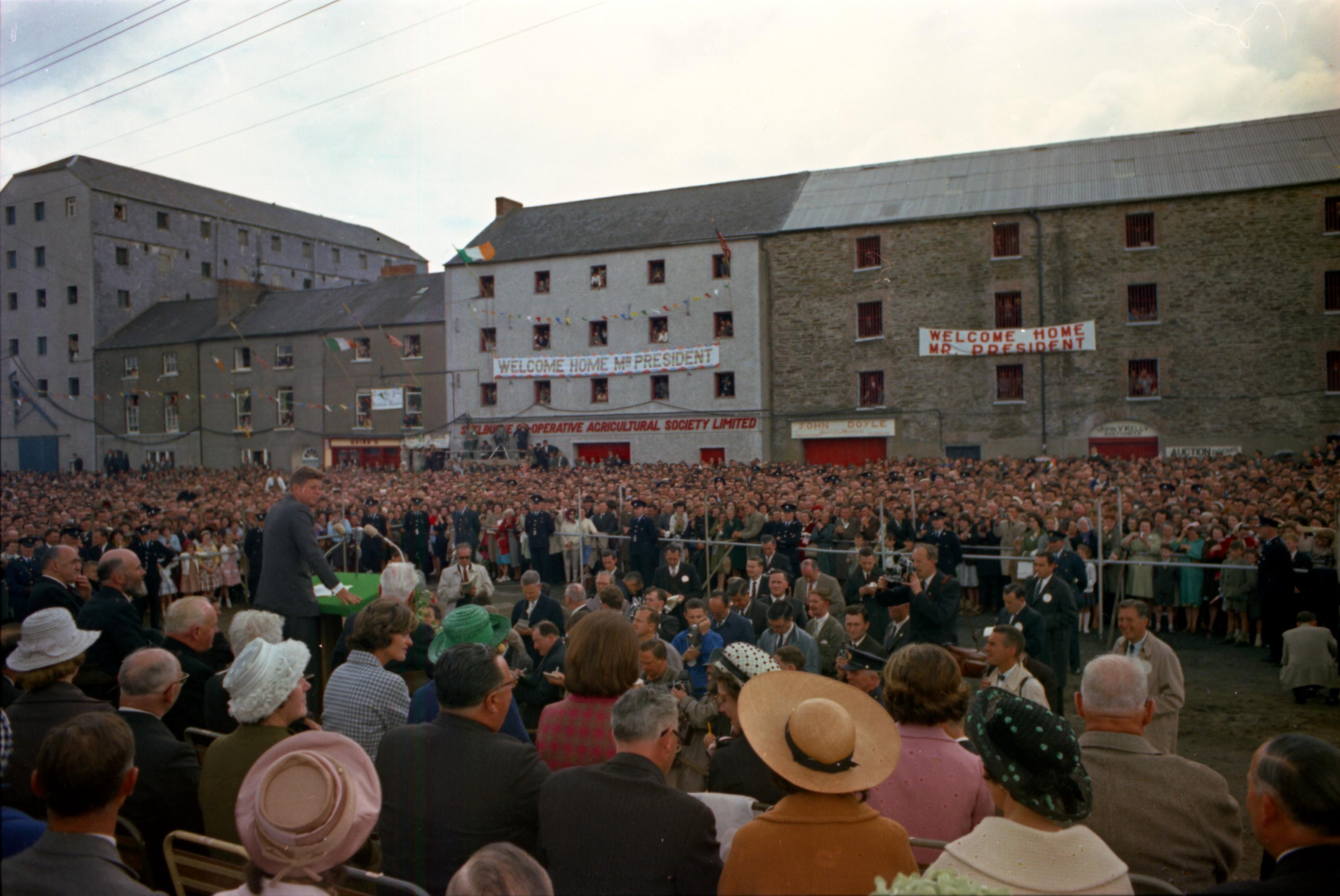
U.S. president John F. Kennedy addresses the people of New Ross.

- 26 June – Following a three-day visit to West Germany which he concluded with his historic Cold War address in West Berlin earlier in the day, President Kennedy of the United States arrived in Ireland for a four-day state visit. He was greeted at Dublin Airport by President de Valera and Taoiseach Seán Lemass. His motorcade to the US Ambassador's residence in the Phoenix Park in Dublin was met by large crowds in O'Connell Street and Dame Street.
- 27 June – Kennedy flew to New Ross by helicopter where he made a speech to a crowd. He drove to his ancestral home nearby in Dunganstown where he met extended family. Afterwards he flew to Wexford where he was given the freedom of the town. That evening, he attended a garden party at Áras an Uachtaráin, home of the Irish president, and afterwards attended a state dinner hosted by the Taoiseach in his honour at Iveagh House in Dublin.
- 28 June – Kennedy flew to Cork by helicopter. Following a motorcade through the crowded city he was awarded the freedom of the city. Back in Dublin in the afternoon, he visited Arbour Hill where he laid a wreath at the graves of executed leaders of 1916 Rising. Afterwards, he visited Leinster House where he became the first statesman to address both Houses of the Oireachtas. At Dublin Castle, he was conferred with degrees of Doctor of Laws by both the National University of Ireland and by Dublin University. He was also awarded the freedom of the city of Dublin.
- 29 June – Kennedy flew by helicopter to Galway where a motorcade took him to City Hall where he was made a freeman of the city. He made a speech to a large crowd in Eyre Square before another motorcade took him to his helicopter in Salthill from where he flew to Limerick, where he landed at Greenpark Racecourse. He was conferred with the freedom of Limerick. After speaking to the crowd, he flew to Shannon Airport nearby where he made a farewell speech before flying to England on Air Force One for an informal meeting with British prime minister Harold Macmillan.

- 4 October – Speaking on the nuclear test ban treaty at the United Nations in New York, the Minister for External Affairs, Frank Aiken, called for an end to all nuclear weapons.
- 16 October – Taoiseach Seán Lemass was greeted by US president John Kennedy at the White House where he inspected a guard of honour.
- 1 November – Domhnall Ua Buachalla, the last Governor-General of the Irish Free State, was buried in Dublin.
- 7 November – The Beatles arrived in Dublin for two concerts in the Adelphi Cinema, the only time they performed in Ireland. Gardaí (police) struggled to maintain control in Abbey Street and O'Connell Street when unruly crowds created disorder.

=== Death of John F Kennedy ===
- 22 November – President de Valera addressed the nation following the murder of U.S. president John Kennedy.
- 24 November – De Valera left to attend Kennedy's funeral. He was accompanied by cadets who were invited by Jacqueline Kennedy to form a guard of honour.
- 26 November – Ireland held a national day of mourning for President Kennedy. Many businesses were shut.

== Arts and literature ==
- 2 June – Benjamin Britten's A Hymn of St Columba premièred at Gartan in County Donegal.
- Cork Opera House reopened after being fully rebuilt.
- John McGahern's semi-autobiographical first novel, The Barracks, was published.
- Seamus Heaney's poem Mid Term Break was published in Kilkenny Magazine

== Sport ==
=== Association football ===
- Shelbourne won the FAI Cup.

=== Horse racing ===
- Paddy Prendergast became the first Irish-based horse trainer to be British flat racing Champion Trainer; he retained the title for two more years.

== Births ==
- 7 January – Tony O'Sullivan, Cork hurler.
- February – Theresa Lowe, television presenter.
- 3 March – Conor Lenihan, Fianna Fáil party Teachta Dála (TD) for Dublin South-West and Minister of State.
- 19 March – Mark Dearey, businessman and Green Party councillor in Dundalk.
- 25 March – Kevin O'Rourke, economic historian, born in Switzerland.
- 26 March – Paul Doolin, association football player.
- 29 March – Pat Gallagher, Labour Party politician.
- 3 April – Ciarán Cuffe, Green Party TD for Dún Laoghaire.
- 4 April – Graham Norton, actor, comedian and television presenter.
- 1 June – Michael Creed, Fine Gael party TD for Cork North-West.
- 3 June – Lucy Grealy, poet and memoirist (died 2002).
- 13 June – Larry Tompkins, Kildare and Cork Gaelic footballer.
- 21 June – Carlos O'Connell, decathlete.
- 25 June – Liam Walsh, Kilkenny hurler.
- 26 June – Tomás Mulcahy, Cork hurler.
- 23 July – Andy Townsend, association football player.
- 28 July – Eamon Ryan, Green Party TD for Dublin South and Dublin Bay South, Green Party leader, and Minister for the Environment, Climate and Communications.
- 22 August – Terry McHugh, javelin thrower.
- 31 August – Todd Carty, actor.
- 10 September – Marian Keyes, novelist.
- 24 September – Margaret Cox, Fianna Fáil senator.
- 25 September – Niall Cahalane, Cork Gaelic footballer.
- 9 November – Kieran O'Regan, association football player.
- 13 November – Joe Dooley, Offaly hurler, manager.
- 1 December – Paul Bradford, Fine Gael senator.
- 5 December – Tony Keady, Galway hurler (died 2017).

=== Full date unknown ===
- Pat Boran, poet.
- Orla Kiely, fashion and textile designer.
- Bryan Smyth, singer, actor and television presenter.

== Deaths ==
- 17 January – Thomas Johnson, first parliamentary leader of the Labour Party, aged 91.
- 1 February – John Cardinal D'Alton, Archbishop of Armagh and Primate of All Ireland from 1946 to 1963 (born 1882).
- 4 February – Brinsley MacNamara, novelist and playwright (born 1890).
- 22 February – Padraig O'Keeffe, fiddle player (born 1887).
- 3 March – Brian O'Higgins, Sinn Féin party member of parliament and party president (born 1882).
- 19 March – Joseph Brennan, civil servant and Governor of the Central Bank of Ireland (born 1887).
- 16 May – Patrick Little, Fianna Fáil TD and Cabinet minister (born 1884).
- 31 May – Seán O'Hegarty, Irish Republican Army member during the Irish War of Independence (born 1881).
- 12 June – Andrew Cunningham, 1st Viscount Cunningham of Hyndhope, British admiral of the Second World War and First Sea Lord (born 1883).
- 23 June – George C. Bennett, Cumann na nGaedheal party TD, later joined Fine Gael and Seanad Éireann member (born 1877).
- 11 October – John Galvin, Fianna Fáil TD (born 1907).
- 30 October – Hugh O'Flaherty, Catholic priest, saved about 4,000 Allied soldiers and Jews in the Vatican during World War II (born 1898).
- 30 October – Domhnall Ua Buachalla, member of the First Dáil, Fianna Fáil TD, last Governor-General of the Irish Free State (born 1866).
- 2 November – Daniel Mannix, Catholic clergyman, Archbishop of Melbourne for 46 years (born 1864).
- 22 November – C. S. Lewis, novelist (born 1898).
- November – Patrick MacGill, journalist, poet, and novelist (born 1889).
- 4 December – William Norton, Labour Party leader, TD, and Cabinet minister (born 1900).
- 15 December – Oscar Traynor, Fianna Fáil politician (born 1886).
- December – Andy Kennedy, association footballer (born 1897).

=== Full date unknown ===
- Charles Campbell, 2nd Baron Glenavy, peer (born 1885).

== See also ==
- 1963 in Irish television
