= 1969 in Irish television =

The following is a list of events relating to television in Ireland from 1969.

== Events ==
- February – RTÉ opens a studio in Belfast, and subsequently becomes an important international provider of coverage relating to events in Northern Ireland.
- 2 July – Patrick Lalor is appointed Minister for Posts and Telegraphs.
- 11 November – The Irish government establishes a judicial tribunal to investigate the content of an edition of Seven Days that investigated money lenders. Among the issues examined are complaints by members of the Garda Síochána that they were misrepresented. In 1970 the tribunal concludes that the programme did not present sufficient evidence to support allegations that the Gárdaí had failed to do enough to stop money lending.
- December – Publication of Sit Down and Be Counted: The Cultural Evolution of a Television Station, by Jack Dowling, Lelia Doolan and Bob Quinn, former RTÉ Television producers who had resigned in controversy earlier in the year.
- Undated – Live relays from the Oireachtas to mark the fiftieth anniversary of the first Dáil Éireann.

== Debuts ==
- 9 May – Justice at Large (1969)
- 6 July – (United States) The Road Runner Show (1966–1972)

== Ongoing television programmes ==
- RTÉ News: Nine O'Clock (1961–present)
- RTÉ News: Six One (1962–present)
- The Late Late Show (1962–present)
- Newsbeat (1964–1971)
- The Riordans (1965–1979)
- Quicksilver (1965–1981)
- Seven Days (1966–1976)
- Wanderly Wagon (1967–1982)

== Ending this year ==
- 6 June – Justice at Large (1969)
- July – Dáithí Lacha (1962–1969)

== See also ==
- 1969 in Ireland
