= 1964 in Ireland =

- Centuries: 18th; 19th; 20th; 21st
- Decades: 1940s; 1950s; 1960s; 1970s; 1980s
- See also: 1964 in Northern Ireland; Other events of 1964; List of years in Ireland

Events in the year 1964 in Ireland.

== Incumbents ==
- President: Éamon de Valera
- Taoiseach: Seán Lemass (FF)
- Tánaiste: Seán MacEntee (FF)
- Minister for Finance: James Ryan (FF)
- Chief Justice: Cearbhall Ó Dálaigh
- Dáil: 17th
- Seanad: 10th

== Events ==
=== January ===
- 3 January – Princess Margaret of the UK and her husband Lord Snowdon arrived in Ireland for a seven-day visit.
- 28 January – Families from Springtown Camp made a silent march through Derry to demand rehousing.

=== February ===
- 21 February – The new Garda Síochána (police) training centre was opened in Templemore, County Tipperary.

=== March ===
- 16 March – Taoiseach Seán Lemass arrived in London to make an official launch of "Ireland Week".
- 21 March – Writer Brendan Behan's funeral took place in Dublin.

=== May ===
- 23 May – President Éamon de Valera, Taoiseach Seán Lemass, and Tánaiste Seán MacEntee attended the official opening of the new U.S. Embassy in Dublin, at the corner of Elgin Road and Pembroke Road in Ballsbridge. The embassy was designed by John Johansen with Michael Scott.
- 26 May – the Fine Gael parliamentary party approved Declan Costello's Just Society programme.

=== June ===
- 1 June – A new exhibit for Dublin Zoo, a two-year-old elephant called Jill, arrived from India.

=== September ===
- 5 September – Taoiseach Seán Lemass attended celebrations marking the silver jubilee of the first commercial transatlantic flight.

=== December ===
- 18 December – The Cuban Minister for Industries, Che Guevara, was interviewed by Telifís Éireann during a stopover at Dublin Airport. He was flying from New York to Algeria after a meeting of the United Nations General Assembly when his flight was diverted from Shannon Airport because of fog.

=== Exact dates unknown ===
- The Lifford Bridge over the River Foyle was built, linking Lifford and Strabane.
- The death penalty was abolished for all but the murder of gardaí (police), diplomats, and prison officers.
- Myrtle Allen opened The Yeats Room restaurant at her home, Ballymaloe House, Shanagarry, County Cork.

== Arts and literature ==
- 19 September – The Abbey Theatre in Dublin closed in mourning for playwright Seán O'Casey who died the previous day of a heart attack in Torquay in England, aged 84.
- 28 September – Brian Friel's play Philadelphia, Here I Come! opened at the Gaiety Theatre, Dublin.
- 26 December – Micheál Mac Conmara and Eoghan Ó Tuairisc's pantomime on Irish folklore Aisling as Tír na nÓg opened at the Abbey Theatre.
- Val Doonican released his single "Walk Tall".
- John Montague published his story collection Death of a Chieftain.
- Seán Ó Ríordáin published his poetry collection Brosna.
- Eoghan Ó Tuairisc published his narrative poem The Weekend of Dermot and Grace and Lux Aeterna, including Hiroshima Mass.

== Sport ==
=== Association football ===
- In the Inter-Cities Fairs Cup, Shelbourne F.C. were drawn against Portuguese side Belenenses and after two drawn games won the replay 2–1. Facing Atlético Madrid in the second round, they were beaten 1–0 in both legs.

=== Horse racing ===
- The horse Arkle won the Cheltenham Gold Cup and the Irish Grand National.

== Births ==
- 10 February – Richard Corrigan, chef.
- 21 February – Keith Bailey, cricketer.
- 23 February – Joseph O'Neill, writer.
- 4 March
  - Brian Crowley, Fianna Fáil Member of the European Parliament
  - Pete Finnerty, Galway hurler.
- April – Ger FitzGerald, Cork hurler.
- 10 May – Diarmuid Gavin, garden designer.
- 26 May – Caitlín R. Kiernan, writer.
- 1 June – Alan Lewis, cricketer, rugby referee.
- 4 June – Michael Collins, novelist.
- 13 June – Ciarán Lynch, Labour Party Teachta Dála (TD) representing Cork South-Central.
- 18 June – Iarla Ó Lionáird, singer.
- 26 June – Francis Hare, 6th Earl of Listowel, peer.
- 7 July – Jennifer Gibney, actress
- 21 July – Steve Collins, boxer.
- 31 July
  - Jim Corr, guitarist and keyboardist with The Corrs.
  - Aengus Ó Snodaigh, Sinn Féin party TD for Dublin South-Central and Chief Whip.
- 1 September – Ray D'Arcy, broadcaster.
- 5 September – Liam O'Brien, association football player.
- 1 October – John Sheridan, association footballer born in England of Irish descent
- 31 October – Colm Ó Cíosóig, drummer.
- 7 November – Liam Ó Maonlaí, musician.
- 17 November – Marina Carr, playwright.
- 29 November – Tony Davis, Cork Gaelic footballer.
- 15 December – Paul Williams, journalist and writer.

Full date unknown
- Mick Deegan, Dublin Gaelic footballer and manager.
- Martin Naughton, Galway hurler.
- Eddie O'Connor, Kilkenny hurler.
- Colm O'Neill, Cork Gaelic footballer.
- Derek Turner, journalist.

== Deaths ==
- 9 March – Frederick Jeremiah Edwards, recipient of the Victoria Cross for gallantry in 1916 at Thiepval, France (born 1894).
- 20 March – Brendan Behan, poet, novelist and playwright (born 1923).
- 29 April – J. M. Kerrigan, actor (born 1884).
- 21/22 July – Paddy McLogan, former Sinn Féin party President, firearm accident (born 1899).
- 18 September – Seán O'Casey, dramatist and memoirist (born 1880).
- 27 September – Michael Donnellan, founder of the Clann na Talmhan party, and TD (born 1900).
- 24 November
  - William O'Dwyer, judge, District Attorney and 100th Mayor of New York City (born 1890).
  - Des Dillon, former Clare, Dublin and Offaly hurler and Gaelic handballer (born 1926).
- November – Percy Redfern Creed, soldier, sportsman and writer (born 1874).
- 31 December – Daniel Corkery, writer, teacher and Fianna Fáil Senator (born 1878).

== See also ==
- 1964 in Irish television
