= 1960 in Ireland =

- Centuries: 18th; 19th; 20th; 21st
- Decades: 1940s; 1950s; 1960s; 1970s; 1980s
- See also: 1960 in Northern Ireland; Other events of 1960; List of years in Ireland

Events in the year 1960 in Ireland.

== Incumbents ==
- President: Éamon de Valera
- Taoiseach: Seán Lemass (FF)
- Tánaiste: Seán MacEntee (FF)
- Minister for Finance: James Ryan (FF)
- Chief Justice: Conor Maguire
- Dáil: 16th
- Seanad: 9th

== Events ==
=== January ===
- 13 January – The Broadcasting Authority Bill proposed to establish a national television service.
- 16 January – The last regular ship on the Cork–Glasgow crossing sailed, ending a 103-year-old service.

=== February ===
- 17 February – The Television Bill passed its final stage in Seanad Éireann (Senate).
- 26 February – Alitalia Flight 618: An airliner flying to New York crashed into a cemetery shortly after takeoff from Shannon Airport, killing 34 of the 52 people on board.

=== March ===
- 8 March – MV Plassy was wrecked off the coast of Inisheer in the Aran Islands.

=== April ===
- 18 April – Busáras, the central bus station in Dublin (opened in 1953), hosted the first 'Irish Boat Show' along the River Liffey during Easter week, 18–23 April 1960. Although the show's main focus was sailing, it featured other water sports such as diving, water skiing and canoeing.
- 23 April – The first canoe race (of what would later become known as the Liffey Descent) took place along the River Liffey in Dublin from Grattan Bridge to Butt Bridge as part of the 'Irish Boat Show'.

=== May ===
- 27 May – The last barge on the Grand Canal left Dublin carrying Guinness stout to Limerick, ending a 156-year-old service.

=== June ===
- 1 June – Radio Éireann was transferred from direct control of the Minister for Posts and Telegraphs to a separate public authority.

=== September ===
- 20 September – Ambassador Frederick Henry Boland was formally elected as this year's President of the United Nations General Assembly, having on 3 February received the support of the United States for the post. On 12 October, following a shoe-banging incident involving Soviet Premier Nikita Khrushchev, Boland slammed his gavel, Thor's gavel, down so hard in summarily adjourning the meeting that it broke.

=== November ===
- 8 November – Nine Irish Army soldiers serving with the United Nations were killed in the Congo.
- 22 November – Funerals took place for the soldiers killed in the Congo.

== Arts and literature ==
- 5 February – The film, Mise Éire, by George Morrison with music by Seán Ó Riada, had its Dublin première at the Regal Cinema following a 27 January première at Gweedore in County Donegal, the first feature-length Irish language film on general release.
- 13 February–March – Orson Welles appeared for the last time in a stage production, his adaptation Chimes at Midnight with the Gate Theatre Company (with which he began his professional career in 1931), opening at the Grand Opera House in Belfast, and transferring to the Gaiety Theatre in Dublin.
- 23 August – Samuel Beckett's play The Old Tune (a translation of Pinget's La Manivelle into a Dublin setting) was first broadcast by the BBC.
- Patrick Kavanagh's poetry collection, Come Dance with Kitty Stobling, was published.
- Edna O'Brien's novel The Country Girls was published; it was banned in Ireland by the Censorship of Publications Board.
- Eoghan Ó Tuairisc's novel Murder in Three Moves was published.

== Sports ==
=== Association football ===
- Shelbourne F.C. won the FAI Cup.

== Births ==
- 6 January – Miriam O'Callaghan, broadcaster.
- 10 January – Brian Cowen, Taoiseach (Fianna Fáil party).
- 13 March – Adam Clayton, bass player for U2.
- 13 March – Paul Colton, Church of Ireland Bishop of Cork.
- 1 April – Séamus McElwaine, Provisional Irish Republican Army member (killed 1986).
- 14 April – Liam Buckley, association football player and manager.
- 23 April – Declan Lowney, television and film director.
- 29 April – Seán O'Connor, businessman, member of the Seanad in 1982.
- 10 May – Bono, lead singer with U2.
- 14 May – Ronan Tynan, tenor.
- 23 May – Christy Dignam, lead singer with Aslan.
- 24 May – Packie Bonner, association football goalkeeper for Glasgow Celtic.
- 11 June – Dave Henderson, association football player.
- 28 June – Paul Dean, rugby player.
- 1 July – Trevor Sargent, Teachta Dála (TD) representing Dublin North and leader of the Green Party.
- 4 July – Phil Hogan, Fine Gael party TD for Carlow–Kilkenny.
- 23 July – Gabrielle Reidy, actress (died 2014).
- 1 August – Micheál Martin, Taoiseach (Fianna Fáil).
- 10 August – Alan Campbell, association football player.
- September – Maurice Seezer, musician.
- 14 October – Seán Power, Fianna Fáil TD for Kildare South and Minister of State.
- 17 October – Bernadette Nolan, singer and actress.
- 25 November – Mick Neville, association football player and coach.
- 25 December – Tonie Walsh, gay rights activist, journalist and disc jockey.

Full date unknown
- Tom Reilly, historian, author and newspaper columnist.
- Vincent Woods, poet and playwright.

== Deaths ==
- 21 January – Matt Moore, film actor (born 1888).
- 13 February – Seán McLoughlin, nationalist and communist activist (born 1895).
- 26 February – Amby Power, Clare hurler (born 1887).
- 12 May – Augustine Kelly, cricketer (born 1894).
- 13 June – Ken McArthur, winner of the marathon race at the 1912 Summer Olympics for South Africa (born 1881).
- 7 July – Francis Browne, Jesuit priest and photographer (born 1880).
- 20 July – Galbraith Lowry-Corry, 7th Earl Belmore, soldier and Deputy Lieutenant for County Fermanagh (born 1913).
- 27 July – Ethel Lilian Voynich, novelist and musician (born 1864).
- 23 September – Henry Barniville, member of the Seanad from 1922 to 1960 representing the National University of Ireland.
- 6 October – Hubert de Burgh, cricketer (born 1879).
- 23 October – Seumas MacManus, writer (born 1867).
- 25 October – Harry Ferguson, early aviator and developer of the modern agricultural tractor (born 1884).
- 14 December – Michael J. Stack, U.S. Representative from Pennsylvania (born 1888).
- Undated – Annie O'Hanlon, last known speaker of the Leinster dialect of the Irish language.

== See also ==
- 1960 in Irish television
