= Castlebar transmitter =

TV and radio relay station in Ireland

The Castlebar transmitter is a relay station used to broadcast television and radio to a large part of County Mayo, Ireland, located at Croaghmoyle. The site is part of the RTÉ Network Limited transmission network.

The transmitter currently provides FM radio on VHF and a number of television stations on UHF.

== Tawnycullawee deflector site ==
A separate, close-by site at Tawnycullawee was a television deflector station operated by Dropvale Limited, which carried channels from the UK as well as TV3 Eurosport (Channel 39 615.25 MHz) and Sky News (Channel 42 639.25 MHz). The Tawnycullawee site is located at a lower altitude (within the same range of hills) and transmitted on lower power than Croaghmoyle, as it is intended to serve the town of Castlebar and its immediate environs only. Today the site is used for Community Radio.

== History ==
Opened in the early 1970's, the transmitter was originally a VHF television transmitter carrying RTÉ One (Channel D 175.25 MHz) and later RTÉ Two (Channel F 191.25 MHz). These ceased transmission on VHF in 1999, after UHF transmissions from RTÉ1 and 2 began from the transmitter in 1998.

The first UHF transmissions were from TG4 in 1996 with RTÉ1 and 2 migrating to UHF in the years following.

FM radio transmissions began in 1992. In 2005 there was a major change to the frequencies used by the radio services in order to accommodate a new FM transmitter at Cairnhill (Co Longford).

UHF service (originally BBC1, BBC2, and UTV) began from Tawnycullawee in 1985. Originally this was an unlicensed transmitter but after a long campaign a licence was finally issued in 1999. This service ceased in 2012.

Following the issuing of the licence, UTV moved frequencies (from UHF channel 50 to 42) in 2000 and to occupy a channel previously used for Sky News.

== Channels listed by frequency ==
- Analogue Radio (FM VHF) All services use vertical polorisation
  - 89.3 MHz (previously 89.8) - RTÉ Radio 1 Croaghmoyle - 3kW EIRP
  - 91.5 MHz (previously 92.0) - RTÉ 2fm Croaghmoyle - 3kW EIRP
  - 93.7 MHz (previously 94.2) - RTÉ Raidió na Gaeltachta Croaghmoyle - 3kW EIRP
  - 98.9 MHz (previously 99.4) - RTÉ lyric fm Croaghmoyle - 3kW EIRP
  - 101.1 MHz (previously 101.6) - Today FM Croaghmoyle - 3kW EIRP
  - 102.9 MHz - Community Radio Castlebar Tawnycullawee
  - 103.7 MHz - iRadio NW - Croaghmoyle - 1kW EIRP
  - 107.2 MHz - Newstalk - Croaghmoyle - 8kW EIRP

(Other services that service Castlebar and central Mayo are transmitted nearby at Kiltimagh, Mid West Radio on 96.1 MHz.

- Digital Television -(DVB-T-MPEG4 UHF) All services use Horizontal polorisation
  - UHF 22 (482 MHz) - Saorview 2RN Mux 2 - 1kW EIRP
  - UHF 25 (506 MHz) - Saorview 2RN Mux 1 - 1kW EIRP
- Analogue Television -all services now ceased (PAL-I UHF) All UHF services used Horizontal polorisation (Vertical on VHF)
  - UHF 23 (487.25 MHz) - TG4 Croaghmoyle (RTÉ site)
  - UHF 26 (511.25 MHz) - TV3 (Allocated but never used)
  - UHF 29 (535.25 MHz) - RTÉ One Croaghmoyle (RTÉ site) previously VHF Ch D Vertical Originally Channel H (before 1978).
  - UHF 33 (567.25 MHz) - RTÉ Two Croaghmoyle (RTÉ site) previously VHF Ch F Vertical
  - UHF 39 (615.25 MHz) - TV3 (previously Eurosport) Tawnycullawee
  - UHF 42 (639.25 MHz) - ITV (previously Sky News) Tawnycullawee
  - UHF 47 (679.25 MHz) - BBC One Tawnycullawee (deflector site)
  - UHF 50 (703.25 MHz) - (no longer in use -formerly UTV)
  - UHF 53 (727.25 MHz) - BBC Two Tawnycullawee (deflector site)
  - UHF 56 (751.25 MHz) - Channel 4 Tawnycullawee (deflector site)
