= 1965 in Irish television =

The following is a list of events relating to television in Ireland from 1965.

== Events ==
- January – RTÉ and BBC collaborate on an historic television broadcast as Taoiseach Seán Lemass and Prime Minister of Northern Ireland Terence O'Neill meet for the first time in Belfast.
- 4 January – First airing of The Riordans, a rural drama serial, which became the inspiration for the UK soap Emmerdale Farm.
- 20 March – Ireland enters the Eurovision Song Contest for the first time, with "I'm Walking the Streets in the Rain", performed by Butch Moore.
- 7 April – Ireland's first televised General Election coverage, presented by John O'Donoghue, and produced by Gerry Murray.
- 21 April – Joseph Brennan is appointed Minister for Posts and Telegraphs.
- 2 May – Telefís Feirme, an programme designed for group viewing and discussions in rural communities, is aired for the first time.
- May – Second RTÉ Authority appointed.
- 9 October – The British marionette series Thunderbirds begins its first television broadcast on RTÉ, after airing in its country of origin the previous month.

== Debuts ==
- 4 January – The Riordans (1965–1979)
- 9 October – (United Kingdom) Thunderbirds (1965–1966)
- Undated – Quicksilver (1965–1981)

== Ongoing television programmes ==
- RTÉ News: Nine O'Clock (1961–present)
- Dáithí Lacha (1962–1969)
- RTÉ News: Six One (1962–present)
- The Late Late Show (1962–present)
- Tolka Row (1964–1968)
- Newsbeat (1964–1971)

== Ending this year ==
- 9 June – Jackpot (1962–1965)

== Births ==
- 8 October – Ardal O'Hanlon, comedian and actor

== See also ==
- 1965 in Ireland
