= 1964 in Irish television =

The following is a list of events relating to television in Ireland from 1964.

== Events ==
- 3 January – Tolka Row, an urban drama serial by Maura Laverty first goes on air.
- January – Reverend Fergus Day, of the Church of Ireland is appointed to advise on the broadcasting of Protestant religious programmes.
- 4 February – Telefís Scoile, one of the earliest teaching programmes for schools on television in Europe is first aired by Telefís Éireann.
- March – Patrick Jennings appointed RTÉ's Agricultural Advisor.
- 20 April – The BBC Two Northern Ireland service goes on air.
- 14 September – Newsbeat, a topical and often humorous programme, first goes on air. It features reporters Frank Tuomey and Frank Hall with caption stories by cartoonist Terry Williers.

== Debuts ==
- 3 January – Tolka Row (1964–1968)
- 7 January – Discovery (1964)
- 14 September – Newsbeat (1964–1971)

== Ongoing television programmes ==
- RTÉ News: Nine O'Clock (1961–present)
- Jackpot (1962–1965)
- Dáithí Lacha (1962–1969)
- RTÉ News: Six One (1962–present)
- The Late Late Show (1962–present)

== Births ==
- 10 May – Diarmuid Gavin, garden designer and television personality
- 25 September – Maria Doyle Kennedy, actress and singer

== See also ==
- 1964 in Ireland
