= 1963 in Irish television =

The following is a list of events relating to television in Ireland from 1963.

== Events ==
- February – Thirty Radio Éireann and Telefís Éireann journalists went on strike seeking increased salaries and improved conditions.
- 1 June – Gunnar Rugheimer is appointed Controller of Programmes of Telefís Éireann.
- 26–29 June – RTÉ provides extensive coverage of the visit of U.S. President John F. Kennedy.
- 18 October – The wildlife programme Amuigh Faoin Spéir (Irish: "Out Under the Sky") airs for the first time.
- November – Father Romuald Dodd is appointed to advise on the broadcasting of Catholic Religious Programmes.

== Ongoing television programmes ==
- RTÉ News: Nine O'Clock (1961–present)
- Jackpot (1962–1965)
- Dáithí Lacha (1962–1969)
- RTÉ News: Six One (1962–present)
- The Late Late Show (1962–present)

== Ending this year ==
- 4 October – Broadsheet (1962–1963)

== Births ==
- 4 April – Graham Norton, Irish actor, comedian, television presenter and columnist
- 7 April – Martin King, weather presenter

== See also ==
- 1963 in Ireland
