= Television in Northern Ireland =

Television in Northern Ireland is available using, digital terrestrial (known as Freeview), digital satellite (from Sky & Freesat) and cable (from Virgin Media).

Analogue terrestrial used UHF 625 lines, in common with the rest of the UK, although transmission ceased in October 2012, as part of the UK Digital Switchover. Northern Ireland was the last region to switch over, in a process which coincided with the switchover in the Republic of Ireland. Both the analogue and digital networks are managed by Arqiva.

Regulation of the broadcasting and telecommunications sector is regulated by Ofcom.

== History ==
Television on the island of Ireland began with the launch of BBC in Northern Ireland (BBC Northern Ireland) when it began broadcasting television programmes for the region in 1953 (with a regular television service launching in 1955), followed in 1959 with the launch of Ulster Television (now known as UTV).

== Digital terrestrial television ==
Digital terrestrial television is provided by the Freeview service. As of October 2012, all analogue TV broadcasts have been shut down, and replaced by Freeview HD (an MPEG-2 DVB-T & MPEG-4 DVB-T2 SD & HDTV service). Northern Ireland was one of the last UK regions to switch off analogue signals and see the rollout of Freeview SD & HD.

Formerly, only two-thirds of homes in Northern Ireland was able to receive Freeview services from the three main transmitters (Brougher Mountain, Divis and Limavady). At the time of the October 2012 switchover, the Freeview service was boosted in power and extended to relay transmitters for the first time, making it available to 98% of homes. DigitalUK's postcode checker advises consumers of Freeview availability at [www.digitaluk.co.uk digitaluk.co.uk].

Since the launch of DTT services in the Republic on 29 October 2010, some households will find that they can receive 'cross-border' Saorview DTT services. The extent to which it overlaps into Northern Ireland has to be determined as coverage expands.

== Cable and satellite ==
As of August 2010, 12% of Northern Irish viewers subscribe to cable services, while 48% use satellite as their platform for viewing TV according to an Ofcom report .

The biggest single multichannel television network is Sky, owned and operated by Sky UK, which broadcasts digital satellite television services. Another option for viewers is Freesat, which provides FTA channels from the same Astra satellites as Sky. Virgin Media operates cable networks in Belfast and Derry. Viewers can receive RTÉ and TG4 via these multichannel networks, as well as, in much of Northern Ireland, overspill from terrestrial transmitters in the Republic.

=== Cross-border partnership ===
On 1 February 2010 the Republic of Ireland's Minister for Communications Eamon Ryan signed an agreement with the UK's Ben Bradshaw. This agreement will enable viewers within Northern Ireland to watch RTÉ One, RTÉ Two and TG4 on a free-to-air basis as of 2012. The agreement between both jurisdictions will also guarantee that viewers within the Republic of Ireland will be able to view BBC One Northern Ireland and BBC Two Northern Ireland on the Republic of Ireland's free-to-air service to debut in late 2010. A cross-border initiative has always been on the agenda for the Green Party in the Republic of Ireland. However it was later announced that a change has occurred such that BBC services are now to be offered in the Republic of Ireland on a 'paid for' basis and not the original free-to-air basis.

Following a broad range of technical work, the two Governments have now agreed an effective way to provide for the continuing provision of TG4 by building a new, low power TV multiplex in Northern Ireland. This multiplex will use the DVB-T2/MPEG-4 standard with a very robust modulation and a very strong FEC (error correction code). FreeviewHD branded equipment will be needed. In addition to carrying TG4, this multiplex, which will be part of the UK DTT system, will also carry RTÉ 1 and RTÉ 2. When the new DVB-T2 multiplex is in operation – some Irish radio channels may be added. This would be expected to increase coverage of these channels in Northern Ireland, to 90% of the population in Northern Ireland to receive their services on a free-to-air basis, either through overspill as before or via the new multiplex in future.

Foreseen as part of the agreement between both Governments is the establishment of a joint venture between RTÉ and TG4 to run the multiplex which will be licensed under the UK's Wireless Telegraphy Act 2006 by Ofcom at the request of the UK Government. This will be a not-for-profit company. In addition, the licensee will have to put out to competitive tender all the elements of the multiplex operation which are contestable and the multiplex will be operated on a not-for-profit and open book basis.

== See also ==
- Television in the United Kingdom
- Television in the Republic of Ireland
