= One Vision (DTT) =

Pay television platform consortium

OneVision DTT
- Company type: Digital terrestrial television
- Industry: Media
- Founded: 2009
- Headquarters: Dublin, Ireland TV3 Group; Dublin, Ireland Eircom Ltd; Dublin & Belfast, Arqiva (Ireland); Dublin, Ireland Setanta Ireland
- Key people: CEO (Vacant); Fintan Drury - Chairperson
- Products: Planned to offer a digital terrestrial television service in Ireland
- Revenue: None
- Number of employees: TBD
- Website: TBD

OneVision was an Irish business consortium which was offered a licence by the Broadcasting Authority of Ireland (BAI) to run the pay television services on the digital terrestrial television (DTT) platform in Ireland.

OneVision was managed through a consortium made up of telecommunications company Eircom (65%), Arqiva (25%), Setanta (10%) and TV3 Group holding a nominal share.

OneVision considered the feasibility of operating the commercial DTT service after Boxer Ireland decided to withdraw from the contract due to the economic climate in Ireland. However, the consortium was unable to conclude negotiations with the BAI, claiming difficulties with the terms of RTÉ NL regarding multiplexing, marketing for DTT and other issues; and withdrew from the process. The licence offer was then made to Easy TV, the third placed consortium that included RTÉ and Liberty Global, owner of the cable operator UPC.

EasyTV subsequently rejected the licence, and no further attempts have been made for commercial DTT licensing, with the Saorview system remaining the only DTT platform in Ireland.

== History ==
On 4 May 2008, Onevision announced that it would supply six channels for free alongside subscription-based channels and the public service broadcasters.

On 1 May 2009, OneVision chair Fintan Drury announced that OneVision would enter negotiations with the BAI, with a view to taking over operations of the pay DTT service in late 2009/early 2010 at a proposed operation cost of €40 million. OneVision proposed offering 23 channels coinciding with the free-to-air channels. On 9 May, it was reported that OneVision were likely to operate the pay DTT service, and confirmed two days later.

On 9 July 2009, it was confirmed that RTÉ would not launch its DTT service until other media partners were ready to launch their services. The original service was due to launch in September 2009. On 28 August, it was reported that negotiations between BAI, RTÉ NL and One Vision (DTT) were progressing, and that the consortium behind OneVision would announce its future plans in September 2009. However, this did not happen.

According to an article in The Sunday Business Post on 20 September 2009, both TV3 and Setanta would take a lesser stake in OneVision, and Eircom and Arqiva would also increase their stakes in the company, conditional on regulations set out by the BCI. It was reported that this, along with the ongoing acquisition of Eircom by another company, could further delay the roll-out of DTT in Ireland.

On 20 November 2009, AdvancedTelevision.com reported that OneVision DTT had been given weeks to decide whether they would sign off on the licence for 3 DTT multiplexes with BAI, and that if they did not manage to resolve the remaining issues regarding the licence, BAI may withdraw the DTT Licence offer and offer it to Easy TV. It was reported that BAI were hoping to avoid the long delay experienced with Boxer DTT Ireland.

On 4 December 2009, the Irish Times reported that progress had been made on the multiplexing annual costs that Onevision would pay RTÉ NL, with a 20% reduction from €10 million to €8 million. However, the security bond of €20 million remained a point of contention, as well as a lack of commitment by the Irish Government to fund the costs of marketing for the Analogue Switchover campaign. Nonetheless, it was reported that OneVision were close to agreement, as evidenced by proposed shareholding changes, if the security bond issue could be settled and the government could commit to a marketing contribution within a year.

On 22 December 2009 the Irish Independent reported that Eircom would become the main shareholder in the company, and that an announcement from the consortium and the BAI was expected in March 2010. Further reports suggested that the future of OneVision would be decided upon at the BAI board meeting on 29 March 2010. At that meeting, the BAI gave OneVision two more weeks to indicate decisively whether they would proceed to contract. To aid in the resolution of remaining issues, the BAI asked an independent third party to review the documents regarding the issues (RTÉNL-One Vision negotiations) and to provide a non-binding opinion to the negotiating parties, who would then be required to state their final positions. OneVision would therein be required to either agree to those terms and proceed to contract completion, or to indicate that they were still no satisfied, at which point the BAI would likely close the contract licence with OneVision and offer the licence to Easy TV.
