= International cricket in 1930 =

International cricket season

The 1930 International cricket season was from April 1930 to August 1930.

== Season overview ==
International tours
Start date	Home team	Away team	Results [Matches]			
Start date	Home team	Away team	Test	ODI	FC	LA
31 May 1930	England	England Rest	—	—	0–0 [1]	—
13 June 1930	England	Australia	1–2 [5]	—	—	—
21 June 1930	Scotland	Ireland	—	—	1–0 [1]	—
31 July 1930	Netherlands	England	—	—	0–2 [2]	—

== May ==
=== Test Trial in England ===
Three-day match
No.	Date	Home captain	Away captain	Venue	Result
Match	31 May–3 June	Percy Chapman	Jack White	Lord's, London	Match drawn

== June ==
=== Australia in England ===
The Ashes Test series
No.	Date	Home captain	Away captain	Venue	Result
Test 194	13–17 June	Percy Chapman	Bill Woodfull	Trent Bridge, Nottingham	England by 93 runs
Test 195	27 Jun–1 July	Percy Chapman	Bill Woodfull	Lord's, London	Australia by 7 wickets
Test 196	11–15 July	Percy Chapman	Bill Woodfull	Headingley Cricket Ground, Leeds	Match drawn
Test 197	25–29 July	Percy Chapman	Bill Woodfull	Old Trafford Cricket Ground, Manchester	Match drawn
Test 198	16–22 August	Percy Chapman	Bill Woodfull	Kennington Oval, London	Australia by an innings and 39 runs

=== Ireland in Scotland ===
Three-day Match
No.	Date	Home captain	Away captain	Venue	Result
Match	21–23 June	GWA Alexander	Augustine Kelly	Mannofield Park, Aberdeen	Scotland by 10 wickets

== July ==
=== England in Netherlands ===
Two-day match series
No.	Date	Home captain	Away captain	Venue	Result
Match 1	31 Jul–1 August	Not mentioned	Not mentioned	The Hague	Free Foresters by an innings and 40 runs
Match 3	2–3 August	Not mentioned	Not mentioned	Haarlem	Match drawn
Match 2	4–5 August	G Hamburger	Not mentioned	Laren	Free Foresters by an innings and 132 runs
