= 2RN (RTÉ Networks) =

Irish broadcast network operator

- Type: Communications network operator
- Predecessor: RTÉNL
- Founded: 1953
- Headquarters: Cookstown Court, Old Belgard Road, Tallaght, Dublin 24
- Area served: Ireland
- Services: Saorview, Saorsat, Telecoms distribution
- Owner: Government of Ireland
- Parent: Raidió Teilifís Éireann
- Website: http://www.2rn.ie

2RN is the trading name of RTÉ Transmission Network DAC, a wholly owned subsidiary of Raidió Teilifís Éireann, formerly trading as RTÉNL, which runs Ireland's principal digital terrestrial television and radio broadcast networks. In December 2002 it became an incorporated company and subsidiary of RTÉ; it was previously a division within RTÉ. It operates 12 main TV and radio transmitter sites and many smaller relays and transposers, which carry television and/or radio. It also provides site hosting for mobile telephone operators, the emergency services, wireless broadband and other private mobile communications service providers.

In April 2013 a repositioning was carried out to provide "arm's length" broadcast transmission services to all national TV and radio broadcasters. The repositioning renamed and rebranded RTÉNL to 2RN (the name comes from the original Irish radio service known as 2RN). A new board of directors was appointed with an independent chairman and its headquarters was located in Tallaght, across the city from its owner's campus at Donnybrook in Dublin.

== Carried content ==
Saorview is carried from all 64 TV transmitter sites.

The 4 PSB FM radio stations RTÉ Radio 1, RTÉ 2fm, RTÉ lyric fm and RTÉ Raidió na Gaeltachta are carried by all transmitters and relays (apart from the Kilduff relay). The longwave radio transmitter (closed 2023) had carried RTÉ Radio 1 only on the 252 kHz frequency, with some alternative (to FM) content (Religious services and Sports - now digital only).

Commercial radio broadcaster Today FM is also carried on most main sites as well as many relays and many Independent Local Radio stations use the local 2RN transmission site.

== Digital upgrades ==
=== Television: Saorview, Saorsat ===
2rn having built and commissioned the new digital infrastructure, is also the body responsible for day-to-day running and operating the platform providing 98% population coverage at ASO in October 2012. Broadcasting is done via DVB-T, using MPEG-4 video compression and MPEG 1 Layer II audio compression.

Saorsat will cover the remaining 2% not covered by DTT due to terrain issues using narrowband Ka satellite from June 2011. For more on these see Saorview article

RTÉ (via 2RN) are licensed by Comreg to operate and maintain 2 Public Service Broadcasting (PSB) multiplexes (or muxes) on the Saorview Digital terrestrial television service. Both muxes are operational.

=== Radio ===
A trial DAB service was operated in three main urban areas (Dublin, Cork & Limerick) and the north-east of the country, from 4 transmitters on Multiplex 12C to approx 56% of the population.

RTÉ ceased DAB transmissions on 31 March 2021.

== Transmission sites ==
=== Main Broadcast Transmission Sites ===
- Cairn Hill, County Longford
- Clermont Carn, County Louth
- Holywell Hill, County Donegal
- Kippure, County Wicklow
- Maghera, County Clare
- Mount Leinster, County Carlow
- Mullaghanish, County Cork
- Spur Hill, County Cork
- Three Rock, County Dublin
- Truskmore, County Sligo

=== Relay transmitters ===
- Achill Island, County Mayo - DTT, FM radio
- Arranmore Island, County Donegal - DTT, FM radio
- Arklow, County Wicklow - DTT
- Athlone town, County Westmeath - FM radio,
- Ballybofey, County Donegal - DTT, FM radio,
- Ballydavid, County Kerry, - FM radio
- Bandon, County Cork - DTT
- Bantry, County Cork - DTT, FM radio,
- Cahir, County Tipperary- DTT
- Cahirciveen, County Kerry - DTT, FM radio
- Casla, County Galway - DTT, FM radio
- Castlebar, County Mayo - DTT, FM radio
- Castletownbere, County Cork - DTT, FM radio
- Clifden, County Galway - DTT, FM radio
- Clonakilty, County Cork - DTT
- Clonmany, County Donegal - DTT
- Clonmel, County Waterford - DTT, FM Radio
- Collins Barracks (Cork), County Cork - DTT, FM radio
- Crosshaven, County Cork - DTT, FM radio
- Dingle, County Kerry - DTT
- Dooncarton (Iorras), County Mayo- DTT
- Drimoleague, County Cork - DTT
- Dungarvan, County Waterford - DTT, FM radio
- Ennistymon, County Clare - DTT
- Falcarragh, County Donegal - DTT
- Ferrypoint, County Waterford (serves Youghal) - DTT
- Fanad, County Donegal - DTT, FM radio
- Fermoy, County Cork - DTT, FM radio
- Forth Mountain, County Wexford, - DTT
- Gallow's Hill, County Waterford (site serves Waterford city) - DTT, FM radio
- Glanmire, County Cork - DTT
- Glencolmcille, County Donegal - DTT
- Glendalough, County Wicklow - DTT
- Glenties, County Donegal - DTT
- Gorey, County Wexford - DTT
- Greenore, County Louth - DTT
- Greystones, County Wicklow - DTT, FM radio
- Kilduff, County Tipperary - DTT, FM radio (carries RTÉ Radio 1 only on 90.2)
- Killaloe, County Clare - DTT
- Kilmacthomas, County Waterford - DTT
- Knockanore, County Kerry - DTT, FM radio
- Knockmoyle, (Slieve Mish) County Kerry - DTT, FM radio
- Kinsale, County Cork - DTT, FM radio
- Lahinch, County Clare - FM radio
- Leap, County Cork - DTT
- Letterkenny, County Donegal - DTT
- Maamclassach, County Kerry - DTT, FM radio
- Magheroarty, County Donegal - DTT, FM radio
- Malin Head, County Donegal - DTT, FM radio
- Mitchelstown, County Cork - DTT
- Monaghan, County Monaghan - DTT, FM radio
- Mount Gabriel, County Cork - DTT
- Moville, County Donegal - DTT, FM radio
- Rosscarbery, County Cork - DTT
- Suir Valley, County Kilkenny - DTT, FM radio
- Timoleague, County Cork - DTT
- Tonabrocky, County Galway - DTT
- Woodcock Hill, County Clare - DTT, FM radio
- Westport, County Mayo - ex UHF television, now used for Midwest Radio and Newstalk repeaters
- Carslville South, County Cork - DTT, FM

=== Transmitters no longer active ===
These sites are (in some cases) either completely decommissioned or still in use for telecommunications operators.

- Abbeyfeale, County Limerick - UHF television
- Aghavannagh, County Wicklow - UHF television
- Annagry, County Donegal - UHF television
- Annascaul, County Kerry - UHF television
- Araglin, County Cork - UHF television
- Arthurstown, County Wexford - UHF television
- Ashford, County Wicklow - UHF television
- Ashleam, County Mayo - UHF television
- Athlone (Moydrum), County Westmeath Telecommunications. Was MW radio
- Avoca, County Wicklow A - UHF television
- Avoca, County Wicklow B - UHF television
- Ballinastoe, County Wicklow - UHF television
- Ballineen, County Cork - UHF television
- Ballingeary, County Cork - UHF television
- Ballinglen, County Wicklow - UHF television
- Ballintrillick, County Sligo - UHF television
- Ballyandreen, County Cork - UHF television
- Ballymacarbry, County Waterford - UHF television
- Ballynakilly, County Kerry - UHF television
- Ballyporeen, County Tipperary - UHF television
- Ballinure, County Cork - Telecommunications only. Was MW radio.
- Bealanabrack, County Galway - UHF television
- Belgooley, County Cork - UHF television
- Ben Gorm, County Mayo - UHF television
- Blarney, County Cork - UHF television
- Bonane, County Kerry - UHF television
- Briska, County Mayo - UHF television
- Brittas Bay, County Wicklow - UHF television
- Broadford, County Clare - UHF television
- Clarkstown, County Meath - LW Radio
- Corrnamona, County Galway - UHF television
- Crossbarry, County Cork - UHF television
- Donnybrook, Dublin, County Dublin - VHF television, FM radio (pre-Three Rock)
- Droumgarriff, County Cork - UHF television
- Dromanassig, County Kerry - UHF television
- Dunquin, County Kerry - UHF television
- Dunmanway, County Cork - UHF television
- Failmore, County Galway - UHF television
- Glenbeigh, County Kerry - UHF television
- Glencar, County Kerry - UHF television
- Headford, County Kerry - UHF television
- Inchigeelagh, County Cork - UHF television
- Inistioge, County Kilkenny - UHF television
- Kells Bay, County Kerry - UHF television
- Kilkee, County Clare - UHF television
- Killeagh, County Cork - UHF television
- Kilmacomma, County Tipperary - UHF television
- Lauragh, County Kerry - UHF television
- Listowel, County Kerry - UHF television
- Lomanaugh, County Kerry - UHF television
- Maam, County Galway - UHF television
- Macroom, County Cork - UHF television
- Monasootagh, County Wexford - UHF television
- Morley's Bridge, County Kerry - UHF television
- Mountainstage, County Kerry - UHF television
- Mulranny, County Mayo - UHF television
- Nire Valley, County Waterford - UHF television
- Passage West, site located at Marino, near Cobh County Cork - UHF television
- Termon, County Donegal - UHF television
- Tinahealy, County Wicklow - UHF television
- Tomriland, County Wicklow - UHF television
- Toomes Bridge, County Cork - UHF television
- Tracton, County Cork - UHF television
- Tullamore, County Offaly - MW Radio
- Woodenbridge, County Wicklow - UHF television
- Youghal (south), site at The Strand, Youghal town, County Cork - UHF television
