= 1960 in Irish television =

The following is a list of events relating to television in Ireland from 1960.

== Events ==
- 6 April – The Broadcasting Authority Act, establishing the new television service, was enacted.
- June – Architect Michael Scott was commissioned to design new television studios at Montrose, Donnybrook.
- 2 June – First meeting of the Radio Éireann Authority (later the RTÉ Authority), a seven-member board established by the Broadcasting Authority Act to make policy and guide corporate direction for radio and television in Ireland.
- August
  - The official Telefís Éireann symbol, designed by Richard Butterworth of the broadcaster's design department, was adopted and published. Its design was based on Saint Brigid's cross.
  - Introduction of the first combined television and radio licence fee, costing £4. The price of a single radio licence increased to £1.
- November – Edward J. Roth was appointed the first Director-General of RTÉ.

== See also ==
- 1960 in Ireland
