= 1961 in Irish television =

The following is a list of events relating to television in Ireland from 1961.

== Events ==
- 5 September – Telefís Éireann began transmission of test pictures.
- December – The first issue of RTV Guide, RTÉ's original programme journal, was published.
- 31 December – Launch of Telefís Éireann. Its opening night included an address by President Éamon de Valera, and the first news bulletin read by Charles Mitchel. On the same day Ireland's first television advert break in was broadcast.

== Debuts ==
=== RTÉ ===
- 31 December – RTÉ News: Nine O'Clock (1961–present)

== See also ==
- 1961 in Ireland
