= Flann Ó Riain =

Irish cartoonist, writer and language activist (1929–2008)

- Born: 18 September 1929; Lucan, County Dublin, Ireland
- Died: 6 December 2008 (aged 79); Tipperary, County Tipperary, Ireland
- Occupation(s): Cartoonist, writer, Irish language activist, teacher
- Spouse: Norita Collins
- Partner: Annette McHugh

Flann Ó Riain (18 September 1929 – 6 December 2008) was an Irish cartoonist, writer and Irish language activist. He was born on 18 September 1929 in Lucan, County Dublin. He was primarily known for his work as a political cartoonist with the Irish Independent newspaper. Using the nom de plume "Doll", he appeared regularly in the newspaper, where he created satirical cartoons. He was also known as creator of the 1960s Irish language television series Dáithí Lacha, and Rí Rá agus Ruaille Buaille.

== Early life ==
Ó Riain was born in Lucan, County Dublin, to Edmund and Nora Ryan. His father, a member of the Garda Síochána (police), took a posting in Arranmore, County Donegal, in order to foster his son's interest in the Irish language. From there, he attended numerous national schools throughout the country. From school, he attended St Patrick's College, Dublin, graduating as a primary school teacher.

In 1977, he was confined in Mountjoy Prison, having been fined for refusing to pay his television licence in protest at what he saw as RTÉ's neglect of the Irish language. He was subsequently released after the fine was paid anonymously.

He also was a writer of books on history and language.

== Books ==
- Dáithí Lacha - (1965)
- Dáithí Lacha '67 - (1967)
- I gComhar le Doll - ISBN 0902537008 (1970)
- Euphoria is a lovely word - ISBN 0902537008 (1972)
- Suas agus Siós: Sórt Scéil - ISBN 0905027035 (1976)
- Lazy Way to Irish - ISBN 0862432871 (1995)
- Lazy Way to Welsh - ISBN 0862432405 (1995)
- Scéal An "Union Paddy" - ISSN 0010-2369 (1995)
- Townlands of Leinster and the People Who Lived There - ISBN 1851824650 (2000)
- Duanairí 1, illustrator - (1974)
- Lazy Way to Gaelic, illustrator - ISBN 1841583316 (1995)
