= Knockanore Mountain =

Mountain in Ireland

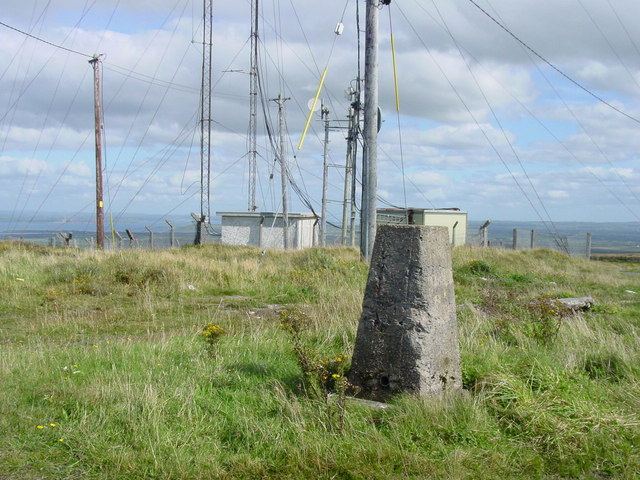
- The trig point on Knockanore Mountain

Highest point
- Elevation: 267 m (876 ft)
- Prominence: 252 m (827 ft)
- Listing: Marilyn
- Coordinates: 52°31′27.35″N 9°36′24.01″W

Naming
- Native name: Cnoc an Fhómhair
- English translation: Hill of the autumn

Geography
- Location within Ireland
- Location: County Kerry, Ireland
- OSI/OSNI grid: Q910425

Geology
- Mountain type(s): mudstone, siltstone, sandstone

Knockanore Mountain (Irish: Cnoc an Fhómhair, meaning 'hill of the autumn') is a large hill North Kerry, Ireland.

== Geography ==
The 267-metre (876 ft) high hill stands around 5 km NE from Ballybunion. Its top hosts some broadcasting masts and a triangulation station. The hill is visible in the distance and the summit offers a good view on Shannon Estuary and a large part of Kerry's Atlantic coastline.

== Name ==
The English meaning of Cnoc an Fhómhair is "hill of the autumn".

== Access to the summit ==
Knockanore summit can be accessed by a very short walk from the nearest road.

== Nature ==
The bogs surrounding the Knockanore are cited on The Irish naturalist, and are considered very interesting from the entomologist's point of view.

== See also ==
- List of Marilyns in Ireland
