= Adelphi Cinema =

Film theatre in Dublin, Ireland

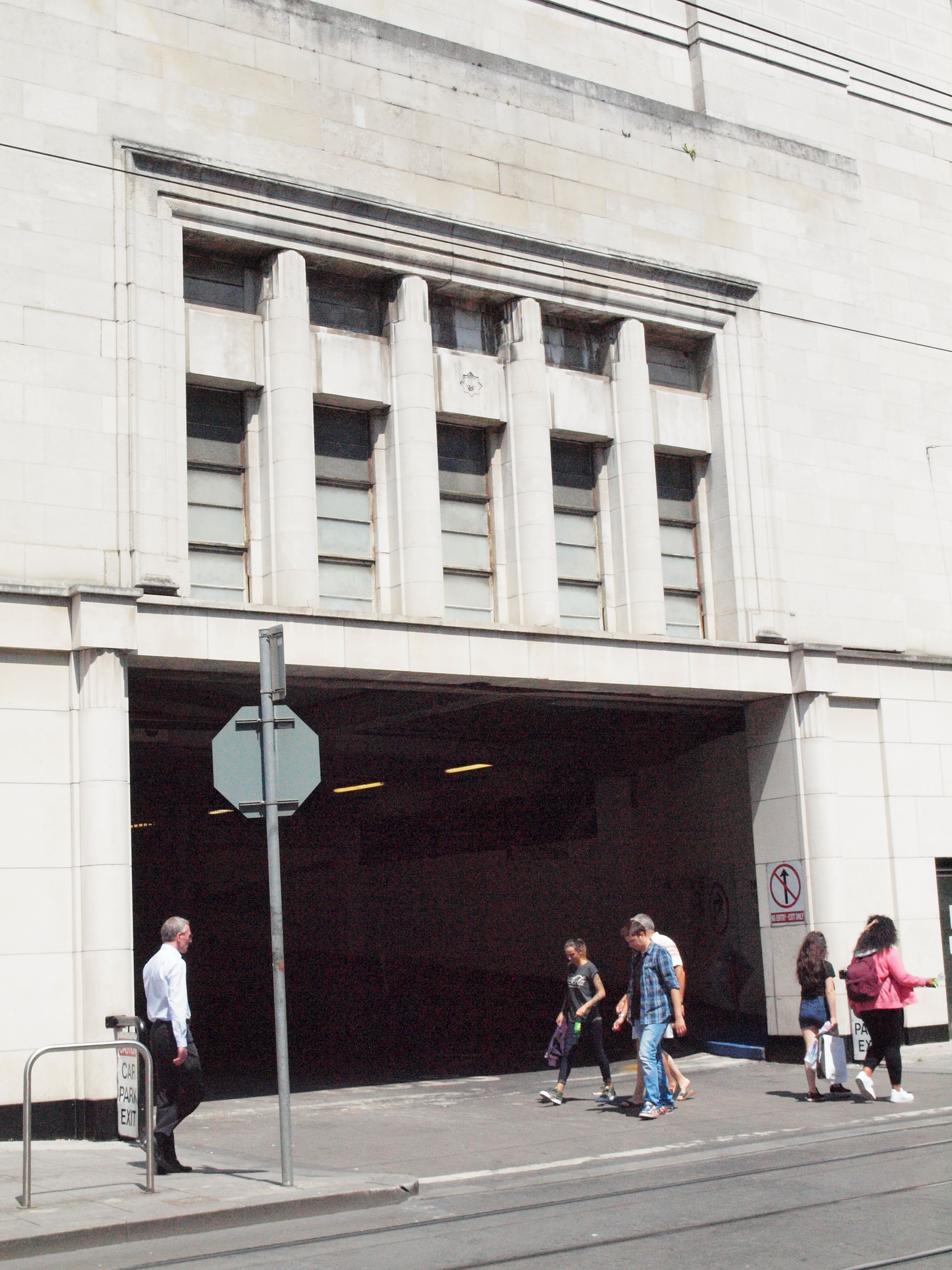
- Adelphi Cinema, detail showing what was previously the main entrance

- Location within Central Dublin
- Address: Middle Abbey Street; Dublin; Ireland
- Coordinates: 53.348199°N 6.262244°W
- Type: Cinema
- Screen: 4
- Current use: Demolished for car parking

Construction
- Opened: 12 January 1939
- Closed: 30 November 1995
- Architect: William R. Glen

The Adelphi Cinema was a city centre film theatre on Middle Abbey Street, in Dublin, Ireland, from 1939 to 1995.

== History ==
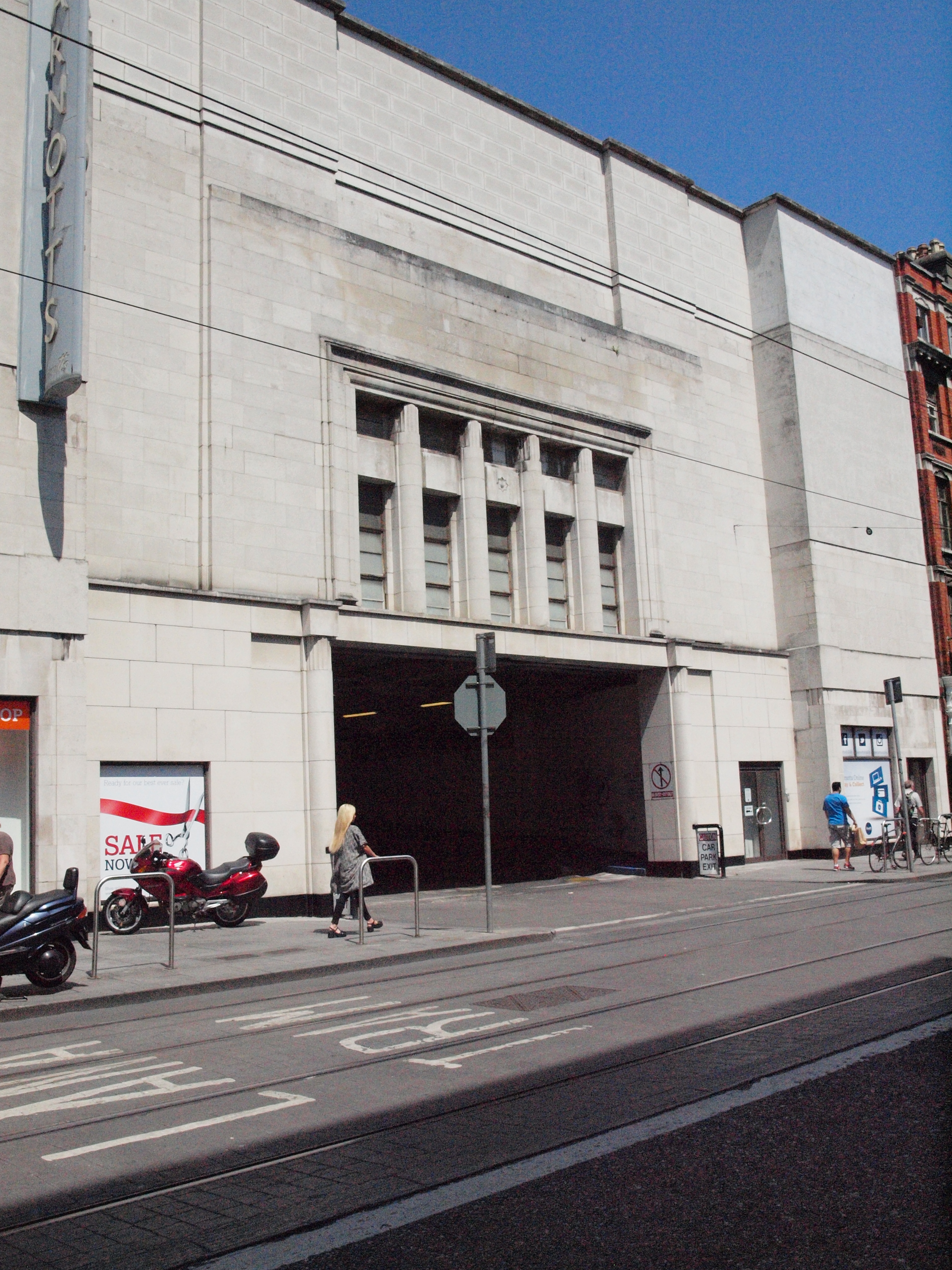
Adelphi Cinema

This 2,304-seat Art Moderne style movie palace was designed by William R. Glen, (assisted by local Irish architect Robert Donnelly) for the Associated British Cinemas (ABC) circuit and opened on 12 January 1939 with Errol Flynn in The Adventures of Robin Hood. While primarily a cinema, the Adelphi featured live acts as well, most notably the only appearance in Dublin by the Beatles on 7 November 1963. The Rolling Stones appeared there on 3 September 1965, and Bob Dylan on 5 May 1966. Other performers who appeared at the Adelphi included the Beach Boys, Marlene Dietrich, Louis Armstrong, Diana Ross, and Roy Orbison.

In October 1970, the cinema was triplexed, and later, in 1973 became a quad. The Adelphi Cinema was closed on 30 November 1995, screening High Society and Gigi, with no admission charged. This once-glamorous cinema was demolished except for part of its facade, and a parking garage was built in its place. Cars now drive in and out of what was once the Adelphi's main entrance.
