= Ballaghnatrillick =

Village in County Sligo, Ireland

Ballaghnatrillick Béal Átha an Trí Liag
- Village
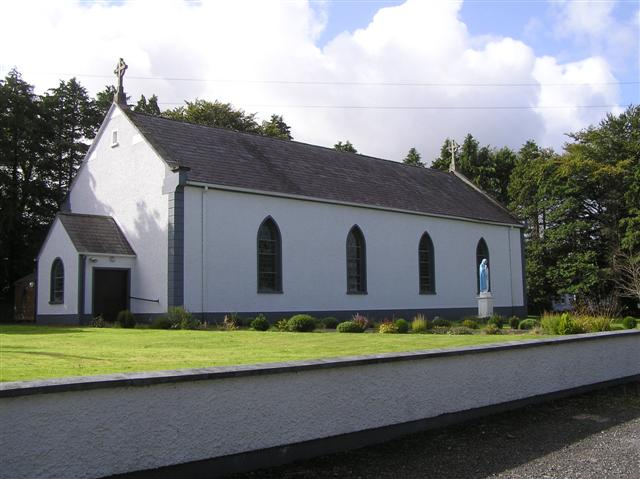
- St. Brigid's Church, Ballintrillick

- Location in Ireland
- Coordinates: 54°24′12″N 8°24′15″W
- Country: Ireland
- Province: Connacht
- County: County Sligo
- Elevation: 140 m (460 ft)
- Time zone: UTC+0 (WET)
  - Summer (DST): UTC-1 (IST (WEST))

Ballaghnatrillick (Irish: Béal Átha an Trí Liag, meaning 'ford-mouth of the three flagstones'), locally Ballintrillick, is a village in County Sligo, Ireland.

Local attractions include the three stones (from which the village gets its name). It also has a church dedicated to St Brigid. Ballintrillick, as the area is locally known, was once one of the main sources for the mineral barytes in western Europe. It is approximately 20 minutes north from Sligo.

== Mining ==
The carboniferous uplands of the Dartry mountain range have been associated with the mining of barytes ore for more than 120 years. Barytes ore is a very heavy inert mineral which makes it useful for products such as paints and pottery and its inertness the fact it blocks radiation makes it useful in nuclear power stations. The first recorded barytes mining operation in Ballintrillick was in 1858. Between then and 1979, six separate companies worked the ore. While there are deposits remaining, they are currently viewed as uneconomic to mine. The ore was transported by the use of a narrow gauge railway to the nearby fishing village of Mullaghmore from where much of the ore was exported.
