= Percy Redfern Creed =

Irish-born author (1874–1964)

- Born: 13 May 1874; Dublin, Ireland
- Died: November 1964 (aged 90)
- Occupations: Captain, British Army; Author

Percy Redfern Creed (13 May 1874 – November 1964), author of How to Get Things Done, 1938, The Merrymount Press, revised as Getting Things Done, 1946, The Merrymount Press.

== Biography ==
Born in Dublin, Ireland. Educated in England at Marlborough College (where he held a Classical Scholarship for 5 years) and at Trinity College, Cambridge University (admitted 7 October 1892.)

After leaving Cambridge University he entered the British Army. After seven years of service (including service in India and South Africa), he left the Army with the rank of Captain and took a position in the British House of Commons. He left this position to join the staff of The Times newspaper. He gave up newspaper work to accept an invitation from Lord Cromer to act as his chief of staff in a national campaign of which Lord Cromer was the Leader. When this campaign was over he accepted an offer from Lord Roberts to act in a similar capacity to him in his famous National Service Campaign.

On the outbreak of World War I, he rejoined his regiment, the Rifle Brigade, and was appointed to the Headquarters Staff in the War Office in London. In April 1915 Lord Kitchener sent him forth as his Personal Representative, with a free hand and full responsibility, to force an Emergency Pace and Streamlined Methods in the Production of Munitions. In the course of this mission—which was successfully fulfilled within 3 months—he came into personal contact with King George V, Mr. Henry Asquith (the Prime Minister), and other Leading Men of the day.

He gained experience serving during and after the successive governance of the three most regarded "Men of Action" of their time, namely, Lords Cromer, Roberts, and Kitchener —ultimately succeeding them with fully enforced authority to carry out their newly established Policies.

He moved to America in 1923. Prior to publication of his revised version of his book entitled Getting Things Done, he made an extensive study of American methods of Organization.

He served as a Special Consultant in a Government Department in Washington for 14 months. Before going to Washington he worked as a member of a Trade Union in a Defense Plant—12 hours a night, 6 nights a week.

In 1925, Creed was interviewed by The Christian Science Monitor. At the time he was a sportswriter. He was interviewed regarding his founding of a "Sportsmanship Brotherhood" in Boston:

The object of the brotherhood is "to foster and spread the spirit of sportsmanship throughout the world," and its code of honor—the code of a sportsman—is that he shall:

Keep the rules;
Keep faith with his comrades, play the game for his side;
Keep himself fit;
Keep his temper;
Keep from hitting a man when he is down;
Keep down his pride in victory;
Keep a stout heart in defeat accepted with good grace;

Keep a sound soul and a clean mind in a healthy body.

=== From Marlborough College Register ===
Percy Redfern Creed: Son of Revd. J. C. Creed of Moyglare Glebe, Maynooth, Ireland. Born: 13 May 1874. Arrived at Marlborough College as a Foundation Scholar in January 1888. His boarding house was B2 where his Housemaster was Mr A. C. Champneys. He was a member of the college's 1st Cricket XI in the Summer of both 1891 and 1892. He left Marlborough in July 1892 and went on to study at Trinity College, Cambridge. He joined the Army in 1897 (The Rifle Brigade) and retired from the Army in 1904. During World War I he rejoined the Army in 1915 with the rank of Captain and retired from the Army again in 1920.

The only other details about him which have come to hand concern his cricketing ability. At the end of his final term here (27 July 1892) he played cricket for Marlborough College in the annual two-day match at Lord's Cricket Ground in London against Rugby School. Batting at Number 3, he scored 211 runs (out of a team total of 432 runs) and more or less guaranteed that Marlborough would win the match. In the college magazine ("The Marlburian") it described his cricketing abilities as follows:

A fine bat with good cutting and driving powers, weak on the leg side, but too indifferent to the game. Fair field, at some times a brilliant one, but too slow in returning the ball.

=== From The Rifle Brigade ===
==== Have established the following, that Percy Redfern Creed ====
1. Transferred into The Rifle Brigade as a regular Army officer from the 9th Bn RB, which was the West Meath Militia, on 1 December 1897, as a 2/Lt
2. Joined the 3rd Bn RB in Umballah (India) in February 1898. Still a 2/Lt. 3RB marched to Rawalpindi arriving on 26 November 1898, having left Umballah on 24 October
3. 1899 – Still in Rawalpindi with 3RB. Promoted to Lt 4 Dec 1899
4. 1900 – Still in Rawalpindi. Member of 3RB Polo Team which won the All India Regimental Polo Cup
5. 1901 – 18 Jan went with 3RB to Meerut. 2 March left 3RB for The Rifle Depot, here in the barracks in Winchester
6. 1902 – Promoted to Captain on 22 Jan 1902. Joined 4RB on 2 August 1902 in South Africa (Bloemfontein)
7. 1903 – 13 Jan to 4 Feb sailed from S. Africa on board HM Troopship 'Ortona', arriving in Southampton (or sailed in the SS Kinfauns Castle from Cape Town to Southampton 10 to 27 December 1902, as he is included in The Times list of officers on that ship). Proceeded to Chatham. Played in the battalion rackets pair which reached the semi-final of the Army Championship.
8. 1904 – 9 March Capt Creed retired
9. 1914 – Capt Creed joined 7th Bn RB on 19 September
10. 1915 – 20 May 7RB crossed to France

Have been unable to establish at what time Capt Creed left 7RB to join the staff. He appears to have retired in 1915.

== Bibliography ==
=== Books ===
- "The Boston Society of Natural History, 1830-1930." (1930) (See Boston Society of Natural History.)
- How to Get Things Done (1938)
- G. T. D. (1939)
- Getting Things Done (1946)

=== Articles ===
- "Children as Town Planners" for Journal of Education, 17 October 1932.
