= Kilduff =

Kilduff is a surname. Notable people with the surname include:

- Christine Kilduff, American politician
- Ciarán Kilduff (born 1988), Irish footballer
- Malcolm Kilduff (1927–2003), American journalist
- Marshall Kilduff (born 1949), American journalist
- Martin Kilduff, British academic
- Mitchell Kilduff (born 1996), Australian swimmer
- Pete Kilduff (1893–1930), American baseball player
- Thomas Kilduff, American neuroscientist
- Vinnie Kilduff (born 1960), Irish folk artist
