= Tom Reilly (author) =

Tom Reilly (born 1960) is an Irish author and former regional newspaper columnist (Life of Reilly, Drogheda Independent), who has written books on Oliver Cromwell and religion, (Hollow Be Thy Name) as well as a book based on his own newspaper columns. He has also written about the 1916 rising with his biography Joe Stanley, Printer to the Rising. Reilly is not an academic historian, and his theories about Cromwell have little support among academic historians who study the Cromwellian conquest of Ireland. Although it must equally be pointed out that no 17th century historian has so far made any serious challenge to Reilly's assertions, which he insists are based on facts, and not hyperbole or propaganda.

== Biography ==
Reilly is currently the manager of Ardgillan Castle, located between Balbriggan and Skerries in Ireland. He has published thirteen books, and has been responsible for the publication of a fourteenth - Cromwell and Ireland, New Perspectives, (Liverpool University Press), which is a collection of essays from an eclectic mix of seventeenth-century historians. A native of Drogheda, County Louth, he spent most of his working life in the printing and allied trades and is an avid local historian. He set up the Drogheda Heritage Centre along with his wife, Noeleen in 1999 in St Mary's Church of Ireland, Drogheda, the site of Cromwell's entry into the town in 1649. The Centre caused local controversy when Cromwell's death mask was displayed for two months under the slogan 'He's Back!' While the death mask was on display protests were led by the Deputy Mayor of Drogheda, Frank Godfrey daubed tomato juice on the walls of the graveyard surrounding the centre. 'Cromwell Was Framed (Ireland 1649)', the first major book from new imprint Chronos Books appeared on the bookshelves in 2014. Drogheda's Forgotten Walls (and other stories) was published in December 2015.

He is married to Noeleen (Crinion) and has two children, Cathy and Eoin.

Reilly's best-known work on Cromwell, Cromwell – An Honourable Enemy: The Untold Story of the Cromwellian Invasion of Ireland (1999), which holds that Cromwell did not intentionally target civilians during the campaign. He was quoted as stating: "Cromwell's entire Irish mission was fought on a purely military basis, and it is to his enormous credit that he never once departed from those parameters." The central thesis of this argument has been challenged in the public domain by some leading Irish historians but without supporting evidence. Many other leading historians agree with Reilly.

== Cromwell – An Honourable Enemy: The Untold Story of the Cromwellian Invasion of Ireland ==
=== Negative reviews ===
- Eugene Coyle's lengthy review of Cromwell – An Honourable Enemy concludes: "it is written in an emotive, excitable style with irrelevant extraneous material... He contradicts what has been established by a large number of modern professional historians such as Michael Burke, Peter Gaunt, John Morrill, Antonia Fraser and others...There is a need for a new book on the Irish Cromwellian campaign but unfortunately this is not it."
- Rewriting Cromwell: A Case of Deafening Silences, by historian and President of the Cromwell Association, Professor John Morrill, opined that the work constituted a "major attempt at rehabilitation was attempted by Tom Reilly ... but this has been largely rejected by other scholars."

In response to those experts who criticized his Magnum Opus, he published Cromwell was Framed, which was a significant rebuttal of their attempts to dismiss his work.

== Bibliography ==
- Cromwell at Drogheda. Broin Print Ltd. 1993. ISBN 0-9522291-0-2.
- Cromwell – An Honourable Enemy: The Untold Story of the Cromwellian Invasion of Ireland. Brandon Books (1999/2008) and Phoenix Press. 2001. ISBN 978-0-86322-390-7.
- Hollow Be Thy Name. Trafford Publishing. 2006. ISBN 978-1-55395-066-0.
- Life of Reilly. Trafford Publishing. 2006. ISBN 978-1-4120-8867-1.
- Joe Stanley – Printer to the Rising, Brandon Books (2005); ISBN 978-0-86322-346-4
- Tracing Drogheda's Medieval Walls, North East Printers (1995)
- The Story of Drogheda, North East Printers (1998)
- Drogheda United – The Story So Far, Anglo Printers (2007)
- Cromwell Was Framed (Ireland 1649) ISBN 978-1-78279-516-2 April 2014. Chronos Books (An imprint of John Hunt Publishing)
- Drogheda's Forgotten Walls (and other stories) Beula Print (2015)
- Cromwell and Ireland, New Perspectives, Eds. R Gillespie, M Bennett, R. Scott Spurlock, Liverpool University Press (2021) ISBN 978-1-78962-237-9
- The Protector, The Fall and Rise of Oliver Cromwell, John Hunt Publishing (2023) ISBN 978-1-78535-200-3
- Making a Massacre, Cromwell, Drogheda, and the Slaughter of Innocents Scandal (Tomás Ó Raghallaigh), Liberalis Books (2024) ISBN 978-1-80341-542-0
