= Me and My Friend =

- Genre: Situation comedy
- Written by: Fergus Linehan
- Starring: Maureen Potter; Rosaleen Linehan; Vincent Dowling
- Country of origin: Ireland
- Original language: English
- No. of series: 1
- No. of episodes: 7

Production
- Producer: Jim Fitzgerald
- Production locations: Studio 1, RTÉ Television Centre, Donnybrook, Dublin 4, Ireland
- Camera setup: Multi-camera
- Running time: 30 minutes

Original release
- Network: RTÉ
- Release: 20 November 1967 – 1 January 1968

Me and My Friend is an Irish television sitcom that aired on RTÉ Television for one series from 1967 to 1968. Starring actresses and comedians Maureen Potter and Rosaleen Linehan, it was RTÉ's first home-grown sitcom.
