= Carlos O'Connell =

Irish decathlete

Personal information
- Nationality: Irish
- Born: June 21, 1963 (age 63)

Sport
- Event: Athletics

Carlos O'Connell (born 21 June 1963) is an Irish athlete, who competed in the 1988 Olympic Games.

O'Connell is the Irish record holder for the decathlon. The record was set in Emmitsburg, Maryland at the 2nd Mount St Mary's College Alumni Decathlon on the two days 4/5 June [1988] . The individual performances making up this performance were 10.89, 7.50, 13.05, 1.92, 48.84 on day 1 and 14.59, 41.70, 4.40, 54.96, 4.21.75 on day two.

O'Connell also once held the Irish long jump record, breaking Peter O'Connor's 89-year-old record with a jump of 7.63m on the 2 June 1990, also in Emmitsburg.
