= It's Too Late – We're On! =

- Genre: Comedy
- Starring: Des Keogh; Frank Kelly; Bill Golding; Douglas Henderson; Gillian Hanna
- Country of origin: Ireland
- Original language: English
- No. of series: 1
- No. of episodes: 7

Production
- Production locations: Studio 1, RTÉ Television Centre, Donnybrook, Dublin 4, Ireland
- Camera setup: Multi-camera
- Running time: 30 minutes

Original release
- Network: RTÉ
- Release: 9 August – 20 September 1967

It's Too Late – We're On! is an Irish television sketch show that aired on RTÉ for one series in 1967. The show, first broadcast on 9 August 1967, featured a large cast, including Des Keogh and Frank Kelly. It is a comedy TV show.
