= 2000s in Irish television =

For articles on Irish television in the 2000s please see:

- 2000 in Irish television
- 2001 in Irish television
- 2002 in Irish television
- 2003 in Irish television
- 2004 in Irish television
- 2005 in Irish television
- 2006 in Irish television
- 2007 in Irish television
- 2008 in Irish television
- 2009 in Irish television
