= Boxer TV Ireland =

Boxer DTT Limited
- Type: Private company limited by shares
- Industry: Media
- Founded: 2008
- Headquarters: Dublin, Ireland Boxer DTT Limited; Stockholm, Sweden Boxer TV-Access AB; Dublin, Ireland Communicorp; Dublin, Ireland BT Ireland; Copenhagen, Denmark Boxer TV Danmark
- Key people: Per Norman – CEO of the Board of Boxer AB; Crister Fritzson – President of the Board of Boxer AB; Lucy Gaffney – Chairperson of Communicorp Group Ltd; Patrick Halpenny -chief executive of Communicorp Group Ltd
- Products: Unlikely to commence trading, had planned to offer a digital terrestrial television service
- Revenue: None
- Website: www.boxer.ie

Boxer DTT Limited (which intended to trade as Boxer) was a company that had been awarded the contract to operate a mainly pay-TV digital terrestrial television service in Ireland.

Boxer was a joint venture between Boxer TV Access AB, now owned ultimately by the Government of Sweden via Teracom (3I recently sold their stake to Teracom in Boxer AB), and Denis O'Brien's Communicorp Group Limited specifically established, with the support of BT Ireland, to promote, support and drive take-up of DTT in Ireland. They had been awarded in principle three multiplex contracts, for multiplexes (A, B, C). (As with all BCI licences, the operating company only holds contracts, the actual broadcasting licences being issued by the Commission for Communications Regulation to the BCI). Raidió Teilifís Éireann would hold one further multiplex licence intended mainly for free-to-air services.

However, on 20 April 2009 the Broadcasting Commission of Ireland confirmed that Boxer had withdrawn its application to operate the digital terrestrial television multiplexes in Ireland.

== Competition ==
Boxer received in principle the conditional contract for Muxes 2–4 (A-C). They beat off competition from two other consortia to win the 12-year contract. These two were Easy TV made up of RTÉ Commercial Enterprises & Liberty Global Incorporated (parent of UPC Ireland) and OneVision which is made up of Setanta Sports, TV3 Ireland, Arqiva and Eircom. On 20 April 2009, the BCI revealed that OneVision had been the second placed applicant and that following Boxer's withdrawal, it intended to ascertain whether it was still interested in operating the DTT multiplexes.

== Promotion ==
A national information campaign for Irish DTT was carried out by the DCENR. Had Boxer launched, it had proposed to use mostly TV and Radio advertisements making use of Communicorp's group of radio channels and via promotion in retailers large and small using commission sales and potentially travelling information roadshows.

== End of contract negotiations ==
On 20 April 2009, the BCI announced that Boxer had ended negotiations on the DTT contract without a successful outcome. Boxer DTT confirmed this on their website and wished the BCI well in reaching DTT objectives. Following One Vision's protracted and unsuccessful negotiations following Boxer's widthrawal, the BAI, its successor regulator, opened negotiations with Easy TV, which also declined to operate the system.

== See also ==
- Boxer Sweden
- Boxer Denmark
- Television in Ireland
