= Keith Bailey (cricketer) =

Irish cricketer (born 1964)

Personal information
- Full name: Keith Richard Bailey
- Born: 21 February 1964 (age 62); Dublin, Leinster, Ireland
- Batting: Right-handed
- Role: Wicket-keeper

Domestic team information
- Years: Team
- 1985–1991: Ireland

Career statistics
Competition	First-class	List A
Matches	1	2
Runs scored	–	0
Batting average	–	0.00
100s/50s	–/–	–/–
Top score	–	0*
Catches/stumpings	1/1	1/–
- Source: Cricinfo, 2 January 2022

Keith Bailey (born 21 February 1964) is an Irish former cricketer. He was a right-handed batsman and a wicket-keeper. He made his debut for Ireland in June 1985 against Sussex, and went on to play for Ireland on eleven occasions. Of these, one match had first-class status and two had List A status. His last game was against Wales in July 1991.
