= Justice at Large =

Television series

- Genre: Comedy
- Written by: Rex Mackey
- Starring: Paul Farrell; Martin Dempsey; John Molloy; Declan Mulholland
- Country of origin: Ireland
- Original language: English
- No. of series: 1
- No. of episodes: 5

Production
- Production locations: Studio 1, RTÉ Television Centre, Donnybrook, Dublin 4, Ireland
- Camera setup: Multi-camera
- Running time: 30 minutes

Original release
- Network: RTÉ
- Release: 9 May – 6 June 1969

Justice at Large is an Irish television sitcom that aired on RTÉ for one series in 1969. Starring Paul Farrell, it was written by barrister and actor Rex Mackey.

== Plot ==
Justice at Large was set around the District Court of the fictional Ballyslattery. Much of the action also took place in Ballyslattery's local pub-cum-shop.

== Cast ==
- Paul Farrell as District Justice Byrne
- Martin Dempsey as Sargeant Molloy
- John Molloy as Mullarkey
- Declan Mulholland as Joe Cotter

== Production ==
=== Recording ===
The interior scenes for both series were shot in Studio 1 at the RTÉ Television Centre in April and May 1969. The series was not filmed in front of a live studio audience and no laughter track was used.
