= Augustine Kelly =

Irish cricketer (1894–1960)

Cricket information
- Batting: Right-handed

International information
- National side: Ireland

Career statistics
Competition	First-class
Matches	14
Runs scored	505
Batting average	21.04
100s/50s	0/3
Top score	98
Catches/stumpings	17/6
- Source: CricketArchive, 16 November 2022

Augustine Patrick Kelly MC (1 January 1894 – 12 May 1960) was an Irish cricketer. A right-handed batsman and wicket-keeper, he played 25 times for the Ireland cricket team between 1920 and 1930 including thirteen first-class matches. He also played first-class cricket for Dublin University.

== Biography ==
Educated at Ampleforth College and Trinity College Dublin, Kelly served in the First World War as a Lieutenant with the Royal Flying Corps and Royal Air Force (originally as an observer, but later as a pilot) and was awarded the Military Cross, before returning to Dublin University to complete his degree in 1919, eventually becoming a barrister.

He made his debut for Ireland the year after leaving university, playing against Scotland in a first-class match in July. Matches against the Irish Military and Scotland followed in 1921, and he began to become a more regular member of the Irish side in 1923.

He still played the occasional match for the university, playing against the West Indies in 1923 and a first-class match against Essex in 1922. He played matches for Ireland against Scotland and Wales in 1923, and against Scotland and the MCC in 1924.

He continued as a regular in the Irish team over the next six years, playing internationals against Scotland, Wales and the West Indies in addition to several matches against the MCC. His last first-class match was in June 1930 against Scotland and his last match for Ireland was in August 1930 against the MCC.

== Statistics ==
In all matches for Ireland, Kelly scored 808 runs at an average of 21.26, scoring four half-centuries, the highest of which was an innings of 82 against Wales in August 1923. He took 28 catches and 14 stumpings. He bowled just two overs, against Julien Cahn's XI in his penultimate match for Ireland.
