= Saorview =

Digital terrestrial television service in Ireland

- Type: DTT platform operator
- Industry: Media
- Founded: 29 October 2010; 16 years ago
- Headquarters: Dublin, Ireland
- Area served: Ireland and Northern Ireland
- Services: Digital terrestrial television
- Owner: Raidió Teilifís Éireann
- Website: saorview.ie

Saorview (/ˈsɛərvjuː/ SAIR-vyoo) is the national digital terrestrial television (DTT) service in Ireland. It is owned by RTÉ and operated by 2RN.

The service began operation on 29 October 2010 on a trial basis with a full launch on 26 May 2011. By legislation it was required to be available to approximately 90% of the population by end of October 2010 in a public testing capacity and nationwide by December 2011. The national public launch was preceded by a public information campaign, which began on 15 March 2011, with television and radio advertising beginning on 17 March 2011.

Saorview was officially launched on 26 May 2011 by Minister for Communications, Energy and Natural Resources Pat Rabbitte and the service became the primary source of broadcast television in Ireland following the ending of analogue transmissions on 24 October 2012.

== Overview ==
Saorview is Ireland's national DTT service. The Irish word saor [sˠiːɾˠ] means "free"; thus it is a partial calque of Freeview, the name of the DTT service of the United Kingdom.

Saorview is available from 64 DTT transmitters covering 98% of the population as of the end of Q3 2012. The previous analogue terrestrial television (ATT) network was available to 98% of the population from 150 ATT transmitters, however TV3 and TG4 were not available on all transmitters.

The service is a DVB-T/MPEG-4 HD broadcast that is received via set-top box (STB) receiver or iDTV and a UHF aerial is required. MHEG-5 is the middleware standard for digital teletext. Programme information is displayed through the receiver's own inbuilt EPG. Either DVB or Teletext subtitling can be displayed when broadcast.

Mary Curtis became Director of Digital Switchover (DSO) in September 2010 and reported to the Director General. She oversaw the transition from Analogue to Digital TV broadcast, which was completed in October 2012.

== Launch ==
The service was launched in 2011 with the ASO campaign phase beginning Dec 2011. Two campaigns were launched. The first campaign was marketing Saorview and was paid for by RTÉ, this cost RTÉ over €3million, meanwhile, a second campaign featuring Gay Byrne was also launched by the Department of Communications, it also cost in the region of €3million. Both campaigns used social media such as Facebook and Twitter alongside their own websites www.goingdigital.ie (now defunct) and saorview.ie.

=== Channel Additions ===
Saorview on launch carried just one High Definition (HD) channel — RTÉ Two HD, along with 7 Standard Definition (SD) channels and along with RTÉ's 10 radio stations. The second HD channel to launch was RTÉ One HD on 16 December 2013. TG4 HD joined the platform on 1 December 2022.

UTV Ireland joined Saorview for its launch on 1 January 2015. It was later bought by rival TV3 and rebranded as be3, later all TV3 channels would be rebranded as Virgin Media Television, and this channel was renamed Virgin Media Three.

Radio Maria Ireland was added to the service in September 2018. In December 2021 UCB Ireland radio joined Saorview, however they left the platform in March 2025.

On November 30, 2021, Sky News joined Saorview on Channel 23.

Virgin Media Four began broadcasting on 24 August 2022. Sky-owned Challenge joined its sister channel on the platform on 1 February 2023.

In September 2023 TG4's time shift service, TG4+1, and its children's channel, Cúla4, were added to the line up.

As of November 2023 there are 16 television services, of which 3 are HD, and 12 radio stations of which only 2 are non-RTÉ radio stations.

=== Proposed Changes ===
July 2016 Irish TV said it would join the Saorview platform, however this did not happen due to the eventual closure of Irish TV.

As part of RTÉ's "New Direction" they plan to drop RTÉ Radio 1 Extra, RTÉ Radio Jr, RTÉ 2XM, RTÉ Chill and RTÉ Pulse, but in a change to their "Strategy 2024" they plan to retain RTÉ GOLD. These services closed on 31 December 2025. RTÉ's time shift channels (+1 channels) are also due to close by 2028 under this plan.

== Saorview Multiplexes ==
RTÉ operates two DVB-T PSB multiplexes for transmission of Saorview television and radio channels. Both multiplexes are free-to-air and feature MPEG-4 encoding.

Initially, only one multiplex was available on the service, the second public service Mux was launched with the introduction of RTÉ One in upscaled HD on 21 October 2013.

== Commercial Multiplexes ==
A further four multiplexes are available for commercial pay DTT.

2RN has the capacity to provide commercial DTT capacity on its network for pay TV services that can agree terms with it and the BAI. However the option to launch commercial muxes was not pursued in the aftermath of the 2008 licence process. The BAI said at the time:

"the Authority now considers that it will not be feasible to introduce commercial DTT as originally intended until after Analogue Switch Off (ASO) at the earliest. The position will be reviewed towards the end of 2011 and the Authority may seek expressions of interest in the provision of commercial DTT at that point. A competition could potentially be held during 2012 with a view to commercial DTT being operational in 2013".

It continued:

"it is the considered view of the Authority that as part of the preparation for the successful launch of commercial DTT in the future, legislative change will be necessary to enable the Authority to have formal relationships with the applicants, as obtains at present, and with RTÉNL".

To date, the BAI have not announced any plans for a competition for a commercial DTT service. In August 2013, the BAI confirmed that it would launch another attempt of finding a service provider for the commercial DTT service.

This was to allow the PSB side to proceed with an ASO transition to DSO, a stabilized economic backdrop by that time (3 years time) to emerge and changes in the Broadcasting Act 2009 to allow it have statutory mediation powers in dealing with RTÉNL (now 2RN) that it currently has with the broadcasters and interested parties but not with 2RN. 2RN is currently regulated by ComReg.

In August 2013 a report into Commercial DTT by Oliver & Ohlbaum was given to the BAI, the report outlined the main problems associated with DTT in Ireland including the lack of free-to-air services on Saorview. Based on this report the BAI have decided not to proceed with a licence competition for pay-DTT. The report was published on the BAI website in January 2014. On its publication Bob Collins, Chairperson of the BAI said "The contents of the report raise a number of policy implications for consideration by Government and also for the BAI, having regard to its statutory obligations and its enduring objectives in respect of diversity and plurality. In submitting copies of the review to the Minister for Communications, Energy and Natural Resources, the BAI would now welcome the opportunity to discuss the findings of the report and the policy implications arising at an early date."

=== Main transmitters ===
| Site | Mux 1 | Mux 2 | Pol | ERP | Approximate area served |
|---|---|---|---|---|---|
| Cairn Hill, County Longford | 47 | 44 | H | 160 kW | North Midlands |
| Clermont Carn, County Louth | 42 | 45 | V | 160 kW | North East / Belfast |
| Holywell Hill, County Donegal | 22 | 25 | H | 20 kW | North East Donegal / Derry |
| Kippure, County Wicklow | 34 | 35 | H | 125 kW | East |
| Maghera, County Clare | 48 | 46 | H | 160 kW | West |
| Mount Leinster, County Carlow, County Wexford | 23 | 26 | H | 160 kW | South East |
| Mullaghanish, County Cork, County Kerry | 21 | 24 | H | 200 kW | South West |
| Spur Hill, County Cork | 45 | 39 | H | 50 kW | Cork City and environs |
| Three Rock, County Dublin | 30 | 33 | H | 125 kW | Dublin City and environs |
| Truskmore, County Sligo | 42 | 45 | H | 160 kW | North West |
| Woodcock Hill, County Clare | 47 | 44 | H | 10 kW | Limerick City and environs |

== Channels ==
The Saorview service offers a variety of television and radio channels. The television section includes both full-time and timeshift channels, with a mix of Irish-language programming, commercial channels, and news services. Channels like RTÉ One, RTÉ2, and TG4 are available 24 hours a day, while others provide targeted content such as children’s programming and informational services.

Saorview also broadcasts a number of hidden channels and test cards, likely reserved for future services. These channels are not visible on most receivers and include blank TV and audio channels. On some receivers the testcard channels can be accessed by typing in LCN's between 24 and 33.

=== Radio ===
On the radio side, Saorview provides a range of stations, including RTÉ Radio 1, 2FM, and several digital-only channels. These are available on different multiplexes, with varying broadcast hours and bitrates.

== Analogue switchoff (ASO) ==
At 10 am on 24 October 2012 all analogue television transmitters in Ireland were switched off and Saorview became the primary source of Irish terrestrial television. The process was televised live on RTÉ One and RTÉ News Now, with the kill-switch being thrown by television personality Miriam O'Callaghan.

== Saorsat - Saorview service via satellite ==
Following the failure of the commercial DTT process RTÉ submitted a revised DTT plan including an FTA satellite option to the Department of Communications in mid-June 2010 for approval. RTÉ publicly announced at an Oireachtas Joint Committee on Communications discussion in mid-July 2010 that a satellite service, called Saorsat, would be offered to complement the terrestrial DTT service. Saorsat will enable Irish public service channels to be made available, unencrypted, for the first time, as a means of covering the last 2% of the population who will be unable to receive the Saorview terrestrial service.

RTÉ said the combined offering was designed to be the most cost-effective solution for viewers and broadcasters; to offer for the first time 100% coverage of public service television services in Ireland, and to provide full national backup coverage on satellite in the event of an emergency or catastrophic failure of the DTT system.

Approval for the revised National DTT plan and the new Saorsat satellite service was announced by the Minister for Communications at the end of July 2010.

Test loop transmissions were detected from the end of May 2011 and were received on generic DVB-S2 HD set-boxes.

== Additional information ==
- The service is operated by 2RN (an RTÉ Subsidiary), which can also accommodate a commercial pay-TV operator.
- Integrated digital televisions (iDTVs) and set-top boxes which comply with the RTÉ free-to-air DTT receiver - Minimum Requirements will be eligible to display the Saorview logo. Receiver testing and approval will be carried out by Teracom.
- DTT launch was completed on target insofar as the FTA multiplex, following direction from the Minister for Communications, Energy & Natural Resources to RTÉ and signing of Statutory Instrument 85 of 2010 RTÉ (National Television Multiplex) Order 2010 on 26 February 2010.
- The FTA DTT had to be operational by 31 October 2010 to 90% of the country but the launch could be any time before 31 December 2011 leaving just over a year for the actual launch date to be decided. The planned DTT information campaign was between Summer 2010 and Autumn 2011, regardless of the outcome of BAI commercial DTT negotiations. This also tallies with RTÉNL proceeding with Irish DTT receiver certification announced in January 2010, following the selection of Teracom to conduct the tests and expansion of the network engineering tests during 2009. Commercial DTT launch was determined by the Broadcasting Authority of Ireland after Easy TV declined negotiations on the Commercial DTT licence offer, following the BAI's closure of negotiations with OneVision in April 2010.
- Freeview, Britain's terrestrial digital service, is not available throughout most of the Republic of Ireland. For decades Irish analogue television viewers in the right location could also receive BBC One Wales, BBC Two Wales, HTV/ITV Wales, S4C and Channel 5, as the Welsh transmitters were close enough to Ireland and used PAL System I, as does Ireland. This stopped just after midnight on 1 April 2010 when digital switchover was completed in Wales. Irish viewers around the border region were still able to receive UK channels due to the analogue signal overspill from Northern Ireland but this ended in line with Northern Ireland's switchover to digital on 24 October 2012. There is still some degree of terrestrial spillover but the reception on some channels/multiplexes can be intermittent.
- As of late 2010, only one television manufacturer (Walker) was "Saorview Approved" but now all of the Samsung TV ranges are "Saorview Approved". In 2016, the majority of Saorview TV sets available for sale in Irish TV retailers are Saorview Approved. A listing of Saorview Approved receivers is found on the Saorview website.
- Although Freeview HD and Saorview both encode using MPEG4, Saorview uses DVB-T, whilst Freeview HD uses DVB-T2. This, coupled with the fact that most standard definition Freeview broadcasts are DVB-T MPEG2 means that Saorview boxes can receive Freeview SD, but not HD, whilst Freeview HD boxes can receive all SD and HD channels receivable in both countries. Differences in country coding and middleware mean that Freeview HD receivers may not correctly display the Saorview EPG or work with Series Link.
- On 29 May 2012 the UK Government confirmed TV viewers in Northern Ireland would be able to watch TG4 and RTÉ One and RTÉ Two on Freeview from some Northern Ireland-based transmitters following digital TV switchover, through a special agreement in which RTÉ and TG4 arranged a not-for-profit venture which will be responsible for the installation of the new infrastructure known as "Northern Ireland Mini Multiplex"). Freeview delivery of these channels will be supplemented by overspill coverage from Saorview transmitters in the Republic of Ireland. Although broadcasts are in standard definition, only Freeview HD (not normal Freeview or Saorview) boxes will receive them. Also, some programming is blocked on the NIMM for copyright reasons.

== See also ==
- Television in Ireland
- 2RN
- Saorsat
- Easy TV (DTT)
- One Vision (DTT)
- Boxer TV Ireland
- Freeview, the UK equivalent
