= Easy TV =

Irish broadcasting company

Easy TV DTT
- Company type: Digital Terrestrial Television
- Industry: Media
- Founded: 2008, dissolved 2009, declined offer 2010
- Headquarters: Dublin, Ireland RTÉ Enterprises; Dublin, Ireland Liberty Global
- Products: Considered offering a digital terrestrial television service in Ireland in 2008 & declined the offer in May 2010.
- Revenue: None
- Website: None

Easy TV was a consortium that were offered a licence by the Broadcasting Authority of Ireland (BAI) to run the pay television services on the DTT platform in Ireland. It was last one standing and least preferred in the 2008 contest results.

Easy TV consisted of a consortium made up of a subsidiary of public service broadcaster, RTÉ and a pay TV cable provider company RTÉ Commercial Enterprises Ltd (50%), Liberty Global (50%),

Easy TV considered its position on the licence offer which it was offered on 29 April 2010. The Easy TV consortium informed the BAI on 12 May 2010 that it was declining their offer to pursue negotiations regarding the Commercial DTT Multiplex Licence. RTÉ publicly confirmed on 14 May 2010 Easy TV was "declining their offer to pursue negotiations" on the DTT contract. The BAI officially confirmed Easy TV's withdrawal and the conclusion of the current DTT licensing process on 18 May 2010.

The Saorview system launched in the absence of any commercial DTT system, and remains the sole system in operation.

== Easy TV Project ==
- On 17 April 2010 it was reported that crucial talks have broken down between the OneVision consortium and RTÉ on the basis of a number of issues such as DTT Promotion, multiplexing and the security bond, which a third party has reviewed and given their opinion. One Vision commented to the BAI on the 3rd party's review and the BAI considered that view after deadline of Wednesday 21 April 2010. It appears it has made a decision, not to rule on RTÉ Network's position but to determine that One Vision is unable to conclude the licence as the difference in position between One Vision and RTÉ NL is too at variance to be bridged. Following communication to One Vision and responses considered, it offered to Easy TV the licence and requested some indication of Easy TV's sponsors interest in same before its next Board meeting near the end of May 2010.
- One Vision has apparently withdrawn its licence acceptance according to the print edition of the Irish Independent on 29 April 2010, page 22 This follows an article also in the print edition of the Irish Independent on 24 April 2010 that it had queried why the independent adjudicator in the positions between One Vision and RTÉ Networks had not recommended a way forward. The Broadcasting Authority of Ireland has apparently offered the licence to Easy TV, and apparently an RTÉ Spokesperson has confirmed that the Easy TV Consortium has to consider its position on the offer in due course.
- On 12 May 2010 The Easy TV consortium informed the BAI that it was declining their offer to pursue negotiations regarding the Commercial DTT Multiplex Licence having carefully considered the current opportunity, both parties agreed, due to the significant lapse in time and the altered circumstances since Easy TV’s original application in 2008, that they did not wish to pursue the joint venture at this time.
- On 14 May 2010 RTÉ confirmed Easy TV was "declining their offer to pursue negotiations" on the DTT contract.
- On 18 May 2010 The BAI officially confirmed Easy TV's withdrawal and the conclusion of the current DTT licensing process. They also confirm they withdrew from contract negotiations with the Onevision consortium in April 2010 due to their failure to conclude a contract with RTÉ NL for the provision of transmission services.
