= Television in the Republic of Ireland =

Television in the Republic of Ireland is available through a variety of platforms. The digital terrestrial television service is known as Saorview and is the primary source of broadcast television since analogue transmissions ended on 24 October 2012. Digital satellite (from Sky Ireland, Saorsat and other European satellite service providers are available) and digital cable (from Virgin Media Ireland) are also widely used.

While many people receive their television via Saorview, which is broadcast by 2RN, more than half subscribe to multichannel television networks. The biggest single multichannel television network in Ireland is Sky Ireland, which broadcasts digital satellite television services. Virgin Media Ireland, Vodafone TV and Eir among others, provide similar digital television services to Irish viewers.

== History ==
Television was first received in Ireland in 1949, following the opening of high-power BBC transmitters at Sutton Coldfield near Birmingham, England and later Holme Moss in West Yorkshire, England, giving marginal reception along parts of the country's east coast. The first transmissions on the island of Ireland began with the launch of BBC in Northern Ireland (BBC Northern Ireland) when it began broadcasting television programmes in 1953, followed in 1959 by the launch of Ulster Television (now known as UTV).

Throughout the 1950s the governments of Ireland were worried about the influences of British television and the popularity of the medium. By the end of the 1950s, 60% of the population could receive the UK's BBC TV and ITV from spill over from Northern Ireland, Wales and the west of England. Throughout the 1950s the Irish government discussed the provision of an Irish television service; this was headed up by Leon O'Broin, the secretary of the Department of Post and Telegraphs. The Department of Post and Telegraphs had responsibility for Radio Éireann, Ireland's radio service. In 1950 O'Broin established his own committee on Irish television and bought a television set to receive broadcasts from the BBC. The Department of Finance at this time were worried about the cost of setting up a new television service and dismissed the possibility on several occasions during the 1950s. By March 1951 O'Broin would press for the inevitable establishment of an Irish television service in the state. In a memorandum to government, the department set out four possibilities for the ownership and control of a new service:

1. Owned by the state directly
2. Owned by a public corporation (similar to that of the then Radio Éireann)
3. Owned by private enterprise
4. Having a combination where transmitters would be owned by the state and content would be provided by private enterprises

The Department of Finance was incensed with this and asked the government to tell O'Broin to resubmit the proposals through the Department of Finance according to the formal procedures of the Civil Service. John A. Costello, the Taoiseach, did so and returned the memo to the Department of Post and Telegraphs. The Minister for Finance refused to look at TV, calling it a "luxury service". Through this O'Broin was able to get funding for the research he had asked for.

The public service broadcaster, Telefís Éireann, opened in 1961 with the first public transmissions on 31 December 1961. An additional channel RTÉ2 began operation in November 1978. TG4 launched on 31 October 1996 as a free-to-air public service broadcaster that targets Irish language viewers.

Initially, the national RTÉ service was created to divert attention from British television, as most households could receive British signals easily, from Northern Ireland and Wales, via overspill. Where British signals were strong, two thirds watched ITV, and one third BBC or RTÉ. The earliest colour broadcasts in Ireland took place in 1968. However, a full colour service was only introduced in 1973, with The Late Late Show remaining in monochrome until 1976.

On 20 September 1998, TV3 launched as the first independent commercial broadcaster in Ireland. In the 2000s television in Ireland expanded with the launch of Eir Sport 1, Bubble Hits (now defunct) and 3e (originally C6 on Cable, later added to Sky), which are available through PayTV cable and satellite services. TV3 purchased C6 and rebranded it 3e. Only with the launch of Saorview (FTA DTT) was 3e available free-to-air.

Ireland commenced its switch over to its free-to-air digital terrestrial television (DTT) in October 2010. This provided viewers with greater viewing opportunities with an increase in public service channels, i.e. of commercial services with the possibility of more public service channels from existing public service broadcaster and possibly two new channels, the Houses of the Oireachtas Channel and the Irish Film Channel, subject to finance from the government for the last two. The then Minister for Communications Pat Rabbitte aspired to have a complete DTT service rolled out by 31 December 2011.

== Regulation ==
In Ireland, the Commission for Communications Regulation regulates radio wave spectrum licensing, and since 1 October 2009 the Broadcasting Authority of Ireland regulates both public service broadcasters such as RTÉ, TG4 and commercial broadcasters.

== Digital terrestrial television ==
Between 2008 and 2010, service providers for the commercial digital terrestrial television (DTT) service varied. Negotiations between the three key players which included Boxer, OneVision (DTT), and Easy TV were deemed unsuccessful. Both Boxer and Onevision failed to sign-off an agreement between BAI and RTÉNL. Easy TV considered its position on the license offer put to it on 29 April 2010. The Easy TV consortium informed the BAI on 12 May 2010 that it was declining their offer to pursue negotiations regarding the Commercial DTT Multiplex Licence.

On 17 March 2011, Saorview, Ireland's national free-to-air DTT service, launched a public advertising campaign to highlight the integration of digital terrestrial television within Ireland and launched DTT officially to the public in May 2011. The service initially aired services provided only by RTÉ, TG4 and TV3. Additional services such as a commercial DTT service were deferred until a later date. The BAI have since ended negotiations to find a suitable service provider for such content.

Public service channels are carried by 2RN (Under the Saorview brand), with this service operational to 90% of the country by 31 October 2010 and complete by 31 December 2011 (98%). However, publicly accessible tests of this system were available across large swathes of the country since December 2009 with further expansion since 29 October 2010 with a soft launch in Spring 2011 culminating in a hard launch before 31 December 2011 when the ASO phase began.

The Irish system, being used by both RTÉNL and any subsequent commercial DTT provider, is a MPEG-4 DVB-T service with an MHEG-5 interactive layer.

RTÉ Television were awarded a licence to operate a single multiplex, with a second multiplex which followed once analogue broadcasting ceased on 24 October 2012. Other services to launch on the second multiplex include additional services from TV3 such as TV3HD, TV3+1, 3Kids and 3Classics and additional channels from RTÉ such as an arts channel and music channel.

The Broadcasting Act 2009 provided provision for the launch of two additional public services. These include an Oireachtas Channel and an Irish Film Channel. The Oireachtas TV service currently broadcasts on Saorview channel 22. The Irish Film Board will oversee operation for the Irish Film Channel.

By 2012, SAORVIEW offered 98% coverage for all channels. This was a significant improvement in free-to-air television coverage. Similar services such as Saorview available in the United Kingdom (i.e. Freeview) and other parts of Europe are not compatible with Ireland's DTT service. RTÉ recommends that consumers wishing to avail of the SAORVIEW service only purchase receivers that carry the SAORVIEW approved logo. In practice, most MPEG-4 DVB-T compatible equipment, such as that conforming to the UK's Freeview HD standard, is capable of receiving SAORVIEW transmissions, albeit with some limitations to the EPG function. As the Freeview HD system is based on the newer DVB-T2 standard, SAORVIEW reception is dependent on the backward-compatibility of such devices.

=== Historical testing ===
DVB-T was repeatedly tested from 2RN's Three Rock Mountain transmitter, with relatively long tests in 1998 and 2001, and shorter tests in 2004, with a single multiplex carrying the four Irish analogue terrestrial channels, and Tara Television while it was in existence, on both UHF (channel 26) and VHF (channel D). These were under temporary licences for testing, which are regularly awarded. RTÉast Networks also broadcast test DVB-T with analogue TV and radio channels from the Clermont Carn transmitter in the Cooley Mountains, County Louth with some signal bleed into Northern Ireland.

A contract to run a nationwide system, with six multiplexes from main sites, and four from relay sites was awarded in 2001 to ITS Digital Limited, led by former RTÉ executive Peter Branagan and trading as "It's TV", who intended to launch a pay TV and broadband service. ITS wanted to offer broadband internet access using the DVB-RCT standard (which while high bandwidth at up to 30 Mbit/s, is not fast enough with 20,000 people on one mast). They had no broadband licence and no viable business plan without selling broadband, and due to lack of funding withdrew its application in October 2002.

The government also planned to privatise RTÉ's transmission network at this time but this too failed in October 2002 following the withdrawal of ITS Digital Limited DTT licence application and a number of other factors.

=== Disability organisations and the switchover ===
TV Access, a coalition of organisations that promote issues surrounding individuals with disabilities and senior citizens, began a campaign to highlight the switchover from analogue to digital television (DTT) broadcast services in its contribution to the Oireachtas Communications Committee heard on Wednesday, 1 April 2009.

TV Access aimed to make the wider public aware of the needs of aging and disabled viewers; they also launched a website.

Promotion for DTT roll-out began on 17 March 2011.

=== Multiplex licensing process ===
- The establishment of a commercial multiplex for Digital Television Terrestrial within Ireland was punctuated with many delays. The BAI (then the Broadcasting Commission of Ireland) engaged in two phases of targeted consultation to assist in the development of its DTT Multiplex Licensing Policy. These consultations ran from May to December 2007 and involved the production of a comprehensive consultation document outlining policy proposals in relation to DTT licensing and the commissioning of independent research on DTT. It was initially proposed that RTÉ Television would operate the free-to-air public service multiplex, RTÉNL would provide the relevant broadcasting technologies and a third party would provide the pay or subscription service. These third parties included Easy TV, One Vision (DTT) and Boxer. Initially, Boxer Ireland was given the licence to operate the pay DTT service. Boxer's failure to negotiate with RTÉNL and the economic downturn in Ireland resulted in Boxer no longer holding interest in pursuing its business in Ireland. On 20 April 2009, the BAI announced that Boxer had ended negotiations on the DTT contract without a successful outcome. Following this the consortium that made up One Vision were issued the licence. Once again, One Vision failed to negotiate with RTÉNL, hence negotiations were unsuccessful. On 29 April 2010 it was announced that Onevision had pulled out of negotiations. Finally, The Broadcasting Authority of Ireland began negotiating with Easy TV (a consortium made up of RTÉ and UPC Ireland). RTÉ publicly confirmed on 14 May 2010 Easy TV was "declining their offer to pursue negotiations" on the DTT contract. The BAI officially confirmed Easy TV's withdrawal and the conclusion of the current DTT licensing process on 18 May 2010.
- In July 2010, the then Minister for Communications Eamon Ryan announced that RTÉ would provide a basic free-to-air service without a pay DTT element. The free-to-air service would provide up to seven to ten channels and would roll out between 31 October 2010 to 31 December 2012. The new service would provide viewers with existing Irish channels, while also providing opportunities to expand existing channel portfolios. This service would be provided by Saorview and Saorsat the latter to be used in areas were availability to access the Saorview is limited due to geographics.

=== Cross-border partnership ===
On 1 February 2010 Ireland's then-Minister for Communications Eamon Ryan signed an agreement with the UK's Ben Bradshaw. This agreement was designed to ensure viewers within Northern Ireland could watch RTÉ One, RTÉ2 and TG4 on a free-to-air basis after the digital switchover. While initial reports suggested that BBC services would equally be made available free-to-air in the Republic of Ireland at the same time, this was not to be the case. Instead BBC One Northern Ireland and BBC Two Northern Ireland were to be made available on a paid-for basis. In practice all BBC satellite channels can be received freely in the Republic of Ireland, due to overspill from the United Kingdom.

Following a broad range of technical work, the two governments agreed an effective way to provide for the continuing provision of TG4 by building a new, low power TV multiplex in Northern Ireland. In addition to carrying TG4, this multiplex, which is part of the UK DTT system, also carries RTÉ 1 and RTÉ 2. This increased the coverage of these channels in Northern Ireland, to 90% of the population in Northern Ireland to receive their services on a free-to-air basis, either through overspill as before or via the new multiplex.

The former analogue signals were switched off on a co-ordinated basis in the Republic of Ireland and Northern Ireland on 24 October 2012.

Foreseen as part of the agreement between both governments was the establishment of a joint venture (as a not-for-profit company) between RTÉ and TG4 to run the multiplex which is licensed under the UK's Wireless Telegraphy Act 2006 by Ofcom at the request of the UK government. In addition, the licensee has put out to competitive tender all the elements of the multiplex operation which are contestable and the multiplex is operated on an open book basis.

As of 2025, TG4 became the sole free-to-air television provider for URC rugby in Ireland, as RTÉ loses out.

== Mobile terrestrial television ==
Mobile Terrestrial Television is TV on mobile phone handsets, which does not have contention problems compared to 3G networks.

The Commission for Communications Regulation issued its response to Consultation 08/44 about interest in multi-city mobile TV licenses that could cover up to 40% of the population that would lead to the Award of available UHF spectrum in the urban areas of Cork, Dublin, Galway, Limerick and Waterford. That response to consultation was issued on Tuesday 28 July 2009. Having provided options to stakeholders in terms of 2 options outlined in Consultation 08/44 of Mobile Telegraphy Licence or a technology neutral Wireless Telegraphy Licence, and minded by the 7 responses it received, the Mobile Telegraphy Licence was seen as the best use of spectrum, given the nature of the spectrum of 8 MHz of UHF band in between 470 and 750 MHz in the five main urban areas due to the limited spectrum arising from DTT introduction and use of 4 multiplexes as the spectrum priority prior to analogue switchover (ASO).

ComReg proposed launch of the wholesale mobile TV network following licence award be rolled out within 24 months before penalty or licence withdrawal from the winner of the contest. The contest was done by comparative beauty contest instead of auction, given the nature of Mobile TV as a newish area and the risks in terms of investment inherenet in it. Given the limited spectrum a wholesale model as noted by the EU Commission reference 2 in such situation is chosen. This results in third parties having access through agreements with the wholesale mobile network operator as Other Mobile TV Service Providers (OMTSPs) in a timely, reasonable, non-discriminatory and transparent manner to the network to provide their own services and electronic programme guide from up to 20 channels maximum space.

The licence would be for ten years and not automatically renewed. Those services are encrypted by the service provider to the subscriber. Contributors to the consultation 08/44 were given time to reflect on the terms suggested for the comparative beauty contest before 11 September 2009 and following that feedback and ComReg's further reflection on that, the comparative contest guidelines were issued and an application date set by the end of the year. The winner of that contest would have two years to build the network and agree terms with Other Mobile TV Service Providers. The Broadcasting Act 2009 was also referred to in Comreg Publication 09/64.

By April 2010, following on from the response to its consultation at end of 2009 the communications regulator ComReg issued an Information Notice on the future award of a mobile television license, ComReg 10/26 Mobile TV Wireless Telegraphy Licence Award on Tuesday, 30 March 2010.

The Information Notice provided in ComReg's plans to issue one 8 MHz frequency channel in the UHF band in the areas of Cork, Dublin, Galway, Limerick, and Waterford and invited candidates to tender for the licence in the fourth quarter of the year of 2010 and announce the licence results by the end of 2010. It weighed elements of business plans when it began the comparative process in Q4 2010. Offer of licence would have been 2011 but this was then cancelled by ComReg. International frequency co-ordination would also be ongoing during the period primarily with the UK.

Comments to ComReg's mobile television licence proposal were taken until 30 April 2010.

By November 2010, only two responders responded to ComReg's Television licence proposals consultation. These were RTÉNL and Vodafone Ireland. Points regarding wholesale access commitments considered critical for the successful provision of wholesale Mobile TV service and the provision of Mobile TV services for the benefits of consumers more generally were discussed. The two responders addressed points regarding automatic additional spectrum and ComReg outlined that it was minded to consider later award of mobile TV license when a national network for same would be possible of for other uses. The main concern was to whether there is demand for broadcast mobile TV, given experiences elsewhere or whether the award be made post ASO when international spectrum co-ordination is clearer. ComReg welcomed views regarding these issues from interested parties by no later than 5.00 p.m. on 9 December 2010. It will make its decision going forward on the licence proposal following consideration of responses to this.

== Cable ==
Prior to Sky Digital, cable television was the most common system for distributing multi-channel television in Ireland. With more than 40 years of history and extensive networks of both wired and "wireless" cable, Ireland is amongst the most cabled countries in Europe. Forty percent of Irish homes received cable television in September 2006. The figure dropped slightly in the early years of the 21st century due to the increased popularity of satellite reception, notably Sky, but has stabilised recently.

In Ireland, Virgin Media Ireland, which formerly traded under the brand names Chorus NTL and UPC Ireland, is by far the largest cable operator, almost all of the state's cable TV operators and formerly all of the state's MMDS licences. Virgin Media offers digital cable television services in cities and towns throughout the country (with the exception of Cork, where the network is digital-only). It offered MMDS services in rural areas until the MDS licences were withdrawn in 2016. Other than Virgin Media, the only other operators providing digital cable systems are Crossan CableComm which operates in Longford, Smyths Cablevision, which operates in Cavan, and Casey Cablevision which operates in Dungarvan, County Waterford.

== Satellite ==
Direct broadcast satellite service has been available since the late 1980s with the arrival of free-to-air satellite Astra and subscription service Sky Television.

In 1988 a pan-European satellite service was launched through SES. The service provided viewers with pan-European channels which targeted the entire continent. On 5 February 1989, when Sky Television launched, British Satellite Broadcasting, which was also available in Ireland, launched in 1990 and the two merged to form British Sky Broadcasting in 1990. For most of the 1990s however, Sky's DBS customer base in Ireland was dwarfed by the large numbers receiving its channels via cable. Sky Digital, Ireland's first digital television service, launched in October 1998. However, in the absence of any subsidy for the Sky Digibox in Ireland – viewers in the UK could avail of both a Sky subsidy and one from British Interactive Broadcasting – the cost to initially acquire Sky Digital equipment was very expensive (IEP 450) and subscriber numbers did not rise until both these subsidies were introduced into Ireland in 2000. In 2001, UK and Irish terrestrial channels became available to Irish Sky customers for the first time.

While Sky is the biggest satellite service in Ireland, it is by no means the only satellite broadcast available. Most free to air broadcasts available in Europe are available in Ireland via the right receiver (set top box) and a dish pointed at the correct satellite. In 2008, Sat4free, an adapted version of the UK Freesat equipment, began selling in Ireland. It is a fixed NI postcode version of a Freesat receiver. Some retailers in Ireland sell actual Freesat setboxes. Both Freesat and Sat4free are superior to generic satellite receivers for the reception of UK television, only old stock of Sat4Free is now available and new purchases should be "Freesat HD" even if the TV set is not HDTV. Imported "Grey market" (as the contract the operator has doesn't permit direct sales outside the intended Geographic area) satellite receivers are sometimes used to watch both FTA and subscription channels from visitors home countries (e.g., Cyfrowy Polsat)

Following the failure of the commercial DTT process in May 2010 RTÉ submitted a revised DTT plan including an FTA satellite option to the Dept of Communications in mid-June 2010 for approval. RTÉ publicly announced at an Oireachtas Joint Committee on Communications discussion in mid-July 2010 that a free-to-air satellite service, called Saorsat, would be offered to complement the terrestrial DTT service. Saorsat will enable Irish public service channels to be made available free to air and unencrypted, for the first time, as a means of covering the last 2% of the population who will be unable to receive the Saorview terrestrial service.

RTÉ said the combined offering was designed to be the most cost-effective solution for viewers and broadcasters; to offer for the first time 100% coverage of free-to-air public service television services in Ireland, and to provide full national backup coverage on satellite in the event of an emergency or catastrophic failure of the DTT system.

Approval for the revised National DTT plan and the new Saorsat satellite service was announced by the Minister for Communications at the end of July 2010.

The Saorsat satellite service has been available publicly since 3 May 2012 as tests had commenced at the end of May 2011. The service only carries channels from public broadcasters, RTÉ, TG4 and Oireachtas.

== Streaming ==
With over one quarter of the population viewing programming on streaming platforms, many public service broadcasters and international streaming services serve Ireland, some of the most popular include:

- Netflix
- Amazon Prime Video
- Apple TV+
- Walter Presents
- Disney+
- Volta
- MUBI
- Hayu
- Paramount+
- HBO Max

Free to access:

- RTÉ Player
- Virgin Media Play
- TG4 Player
- Arte
- Channel 4 (selection of on demand content only. Live TV not available)
- BBC iPlayer (Ireland version, on Sky Glass only)

== Other technologies ==
DVB-H

- O2 Ireland and 3 Ireland undertook trials of DVB-H. However delays in licensing broadcast spectrum to the mobile sector in Ireland forced telecoms providers such as O2 to proceed with 3G/HSDPA Mobile TV. Vodafone Ireland and 3 Ireland already have significant digital video content distributed over their 3G and 3.5G (HSDPA) networks

Virgin Media Ireland provided a wireless cable service over an all digital MMDS network reaching over 80% of the country. This network operated at 2.5 GHz to 2.7 GHz until the 18 April 2016.

The now defunct SCTV Digital provided an advanced digital television service to Cork City and parts of County Cork. It is licensed to operate all over Munster. Operating at 11.7 GHz to 12.5 GHz (MVDDS) it delivered approximately 75 digital television channels and video on demand services from "Sky By Wire".

Digital satellite is the only form of subscriber satellite transmission available in the country and is provided by Sky (and Sky+ HD). The Freesat a UK service is also available in the country, as are FTA satellite channels from several other European countries.

One company provides digital television via IPTV; Magnet Entertainment.

- Magnet Networks offers viewers in Ireland the chance to view RTÉ One, RTÉ2, TV3, TG4, 3e and Dáil & Seanad TV channels via the internet.

== Deflectors (UHF television programme retransmission) ==
In rural areas where neither cable or direct terrestrial overspill was available, UHF television programme retransmission systems or deflectors picked up the UK terrestrial channels (either from Northern Ireland or Wales), and retransmitted them on local UHF signals along with other channels.

These operators faced legal action in the late 1990s from MMDS operators, as they did not pay royalties to the relevant broadcasters, and were not licensed. When the deflectors were shut down, there was such an outcry in those areas that an independent election candidate in County Donegal, Tom Gildea, was elected as a TD on a platform of supporting legalisation, which occurred in 1999.

Deflectors were first licensed in 1999 by the then spectrum regulator, the ODTR. The Wireless Telegraphy (UHF Television Programme Retransmission) Regulations, 2009 were the last for deflectors, as all deflector licences expired in December 2012 due to the transition to DTT. There are few (if any) such systems still operating in Ireland.

== Television licence ==
In Ireland, a television licence is required for any address at which there is a television set or device not exempted under Statutory Instrument 319 of 2009. The annual licence fee is €160. Revenue is collected by An Post, the Irish postal service. The bulk of the fee is used to fund Raidió Teilifís Éireann, the state broadcaster. The licence must be paid for any premises that has any equipment that can potentially decode TV signals, even those that are not RTÉ's. The licence is free to senior citizens (to anyone over the age of 70, some over 66), some Social Welfare recipients, and individuals who are blind. The fee for the licences of such beneficiaries is paid for by the state. The fine for not having a TV licence is up to €1,000 (or €2,000 for subsequent offences) for those not having a TV licence when they need one.

== Most-viewed channels (IRL) ==
The channels with the largest AGB Nielsen viewing share from 2002 – 2012 are outlined in the table below:

In 2013 in the Republic of Ireland 45% of TV Viewers watch free-to-air Irish services from RTÉ, TV3 and TG4, while 10% of viewers watch the traditional Northern Irish channels UTV, BBC 1 NI, BBC 2 NI and Channel 4.

This compares to 2002 figures which show that 47% of viewers watched services from RTÉ, TV3 and TG4, while 31% watched traditional Northern Irish channels.

Irish services had an audience peak of 56% in 2006, while traditional Northern Irish services saw their audience share slide down to 19% in the same year.

Since 2002 the number of channels competing for advertising revenue has risen from 11 in 2002 to 38 in 2013. Advertising on UK services account for about 17% of all advertising revenue in Ireland. Of the 38 channels competing for advertising only 6 are Irish based.

			Share of total viewing (%)													
	Channel	Owner	2015	2014	2013	2012	2011	2010	2009	2008	2007	2006	2005	2004	2003	2002
1	RTÉ One	Raidió Teilifís Éireann	19.9	19.9	22	22.6	25.00	24.8	25.79	26.8	26.9	27.5	27.8	27.7	27.4	24.1
2	Virgin Media One	Virgin Media Ireland	8.44	10.8	11.3	11.5	12.9	12.8	12.30	11.9	12.8	12.8	13.4	14.0	13.4	10.7
3	RTÉ2	Raidió Teilifís Éireann	6.3	7.4	7.1	9.0	8.5	9.8	9.65	10.7	11.8	12.2	11.1	11.4	10.7	10.2
4	Virgin Media Three	Virgin Media Ireland	6.24													
5	BBC One Northern Ireland	BBC	3.83	4.1	4	4.5	4.4	4.7	5.29	5.6	5.7	6.4	7.1	6.9	7.6	9.8
6	Virgin Media Two	Virgin Media Ireland	2.85	2.6	2.4	1.8	1.3	1.1	0.85							
7	TG4	Teilifís na Gaeilge	1.76	1.9	2.1	2.1	2.2	2.2	2.67	2.6	2.8	3.1	3.2	3.1	2.9	2.1
8	Channel 4	Channel Four Television Corporation	1.52	1	1.9	2.2	2.4	2.9	3.74	3.9	4.3	4.2	4.4	4.5	4.5	5.9
9	BBC Two Northern Ireland	BBC	1.49	1.8	2	2.3	2.6	2.7	3.06	3.2	3.3	3.5	4.0	4.5	4.5	5.1
10	Sky Sports News	Sky Ireland	1.02	0.9	0.9	0.8	0.8	0.6	0.53	0.2						
11	Sky One	Sky Ireland	0.93	1.1	1	1.0	1.1	1.2	1.92	2.2	1.9	1.9	2.1	2.9	3.6	4.1
12	Sky Sports Main Event	Sky Ireland	0.84	0.9	0.9	0.9	0.8	0.8	0.94	1.1	1.2	1.1	1.1	1.1	1.2	
13	E4	Channel Four Television Corporation	0.79	0.8	0.7	0.8	0.7	1	1.19	1.3	1.2	1.3	1.4	1.4	1.6	1.3
14	UTV	ITV plc	0.77	2.9	3	3.1	3.5	4	4.53	4.5	5.0	5.6	5.9	6.7	7.7	10.2
-	Sky News	Sky Ireland	0.77	0.9	0.9	0.9	1.1	0.9	1.17	1.3	1.4	1.4	1.8	1.7	2.2	1.8
15	More4	Channel Four Television Corporation	0.7	0.8												
-	Sky Witness	Sky Ireland	0.7	0.8	0.6	0.7	0.8	1	1.18	1.5	1.2	0.3				
16	Comedy Central	Paramount UK Partnership (Paramount British Pictures/Sky)	0.69	0.7	0.8	0.8	0.6	0.7	1.02	1.0	0.7	0.6	0.4			
17	Gold	UKTV (BBC Studios)	0.6	0.5	0.5	0.2										
18	RTÉ One +1	Raidió Teilifís Éireann	0.59	0.5	0.5	0.2										
-	Universal TV UK and Ireland	NBCUniversal International Networks	0.59	0.5	0.4											
19	Discovery Channel	Discovery EMEA	0.58	0.6	0.5	0.5	0.4	0.5	0.01							
20	RTÉ Junior	Raidió Teilifís Éireann	0.54?													
21	Sky Sports Racing	Sky/Arena Racing Company	0.5	0.5	0.5											
-	Nick Jr.	Nickelodeon UK (ViacomCBS Networks EMEA/Sky)	0.5	0.4	0.4	0.3	0.3	0.3	0.46	0.4						
22	TLC	Discovery EMEA	0.49	0.4	0.1											
23	Alibi	UKTV (BBC Studios)	0.44	0.4												
24	Challenge	Sky Ireland	0.43	0.4	0.0											
25	Dave	UKTV (BBC Studios)	0.4	0.5	0.5	0.2										
26	E4 +1	Channel Four Television Corporation	0.38	0.4	0.4	0.3										
27	Eir Sport 1	Eir	0.34	0.3	0.3	0.4	0.4	0.4	0.9	0.8	0.6	0.5	0.2			
-	Channel 4 +1	Channel Four Television Corporation	0.34	0.3	0.4	0.2										
28	E!	NBCUniversal International Networks	0.3	0.3	0.3	0.3	0.3	0.3	0.02							
29	Comedy Central +1	Paramount UK Partnership (Paramount British Pictures/Sky)	0.28	0.3	0.4	0.4	0.3	0.3	0.47	0.1						
-	Sky Sports Golf	Sky Ireland	0.28	0.3												
30	MTV	Viacom International Media Networks Europe	0.27	0.3	0.3	0.4	0.4	0.3	0.72	0.9	0.8	0.8	0.9	1.1	0.8	
31	Nicktoons	Nickelodeon UK (ViacomCBS Networks EMEA/Sky)	0.26	0.2	0.2											
32	Comedy Central Extra	Paramount UK Partnership (Paramount British Pictures/Sky)	0.25	0.3												
-	Sky Atlantic	Sky Ireland	0.25	0.2	0.2	0.1	0.1									
33	Sky Two	Sky Ireland	0.22	0.3	0.3	0.3										
34	Sky Witness +1	Sky Ireland	0.21	0.3	0.2	0.2										
-	W	UKTV (BBC Studios)	0.21	0.2												
35	Investigation Discovery	Discovery EMEA	0.2	0.1												
36	Nickelodeon (UK and Ireland)	Nickelodeon UK(ViacomCBS Networks EMEA/Sky)	0.19	0.1	0.2	0.2	0.2	0.4	0.48	0.6	0.5	0.6	0.5	0.7	0.8	
37	Nick Jr. Too	Nickelodeon UK (ViacomCBS Networks EMEA/Sky)	0.12	0.1	0.2											
38	Pick	Sky Ireland	0.11	0.1	0.0											
-	Sky Sports Action	Sky Ireland	0.11	0.1												
39	MTV Music	(ViacomCBS Networks EMEA)	0.1	0.9	0.0											
-	Sky Sports Premier League	Sky Ireland	0.1	0.1												
40	Sky Sports Cricket	Sky Ireland	0.09	0.2	0.3	0.4	0.4	0.4	0.48	0.5	0.5	0.5	0.6	0.6	0.3	
	Other	Various	30.71	31.7	30.3	29.5	27.5	25.6	20.09	17.9	17.6	14.9	14.6	12.3	10.6	14.8

Broadcast Group	2015	2014	2013	2012	2011	2010	2009	2008	2007	2006	2005	2004	2003	2002
RTÉ	27.33	27.8	29.6	31.8	33.5	34.6	35.44	37.5	38.7	39.7	38.9	39.1	38.1	34.3
Virgin Media Ireland (formerly the TV3 Group)	11.29	13.4	13.7	13.3	14.2	13.9	13.15	12.7	13.4	13.2	13.4	14	13.4	10.7
ITV (owned by ITV plc and STV Group)	7.01	2.9	3	3.1	3.5	4	4.53	4.5	5	5.6	5.9	6.7	7.7	10.2
Sky Ireland (a division of Sky Limited)	6.06	6.6	5.3	5.3	5.1	4.9	6.22	6.8	6.2	5.2	5.6	6.3	7.3	5.9
BBC	5.32	5.9	6	6.8	7	7.4	8.35	8.8	9	9.9	11.1	11.4	12.1	14.9
Channel 4	3.73	2.5	2.7	2.7	2.4	2.9	3.74	3.9	4.3	4.2	4.4	4.5	4.5	5.9
TG4	1.76	1.9	2.1	2.1	2.2	2.2	2.67	2.6	2.8	3.1	3.2	3.1	2.9	2.1
UKTV (owned by BBC Studios)	1.65	1.6	1	0.4										
Discovery EMEA (formerly Discovery Networks Northern Europe)	1.27	0.5	0.1											
Comedy Central UK and Ireland (owned by Paramount British Pictures and Sky Limited)	1.22	1.3	1.2	1.2	0.9	1	1.49	1.1	0.7	0.6	0.4			
Nickelodeon (UK and Ireland) (owned by ViacomCBS Networks EMEA and Sky Limited)	1.07	0.6	0.8	0.5	0.5	0.7	0.94	1	0.5	0.6	0.5	0.7	0.8	
NBCUniversal UK and Ireland	0.89	0.8	0.7	0.3	0.3	0.3	0.02							
ViacomCBS Networks EMEA	0.37	1.2	0.3	0.4	0.4	0.3	0.72	0.9	0.8	0.8	0.9	1.1	0.8	
Eir	0.34	0.3	0.3	0.4	0.4	0.4	0.9	0.8	0.6	0.5	0.2	0	0	

== See also ==
- List of television channels available in the Republic of Ireland
- Television in Northern Ireland
- Television in the United Kingdom
- List of Ireland game shows
- 1960s in Irish television
- Timeline of RTÉ Television
- Timeline of commercial television in the Republic of Ireland
