= Dáithí Lacha =

Irish television cartoon series (1962 – 1969

Dáithí Lacha (Irish pronunciation: [ˈd̪ˠaːhiː ˈl̪ˠaxə]; meaning "David Duck") is an Irish language television cartoon series for children broadcast on Telefís Éireann during the 1960s. The series was not animated, however. For each five-minute episode, the creator, illustrator, and camera operator, Flann Ó Riain, produced a static comic strip which was shown one frame at a time. A single narrator, Pádraic Ó Gaora, described the action and spoke the dialogue.

As well as the central character, the series featured Maidhc the dog and Puisín the cat.

The first episode was broadcast on 31 December 1962. For the first few years of its run, the series was transmitted three days a week. By the time the final episode appeared in July 1969, Dáithí Lacha had become a weekly show.

Today, Ireland's first home-grown television cartoon star is remembered by viewers of that generation for his frequent cries of "Aililiú!" (English: "Good heavens!"), as well as for his large striped underpants — the only garb he wore.
