= Ruth Scott =

Ruth Scott may refer to:

- Ruth Scott (broadcaster), broadcaster on RTÉ 2fm
- Ruth Jury Scott (1909–2003), environmental activist, naturalist, and conservationist
