= Ruth Jury Scott =

American environmetanlist (1909–2003)

Ruth Jury Scott (27 March 1909 – 18 June 2003) was a lifelong environmental activist, naturalist, and conservationist. Scott was a close friend and colleague to Rachel Carson due to their shared passion for educating others about the environment as well as the deadly effects of chemical pesticides. She later served on the executive committee of the Rachel Carson Trust for the Living Environment, Inc.

Ruth Scott's involvements in environmental organizations spanned local, state, and national spheres, and she held numerous leadership positions throughout her life.

== Early life and education ==
Ruth's life began in Grinnell, Iowa, but she and her parents (Samuel and Ann Pokorny White Jury) moved to Delaware, California, and Montana before Ruth entered high school in Canton, Ohio. After high school, Ruth attended Carnegie Institute of Technology, now Carnegie Mellon University, but had to drop out before completing her degree. She later studied natural sciences at the University of Pittsburgh.

== Involvements ==
=== Local ===
Living in Pennsylvania for most of her life, Scott worked with the Fox Chapel Garden Club, the Fox Chapel Conservation Council, and the O'Hara Township Park and Recreation Committee. She also served as the chairman of the Women's Committee of the Western Pennsylvania Conservancy. Within Allegheny County, Scott was associate director of the County Soil and Water Conservation District and consultant to the Parks Department. Her local leadership also encompassed outdoor educational pursuits, as she helped kickstart the Fox Chapel Area School District's Park-School Summer Program for children and adults. Further, she and her husband co-directed a children's educational program at Powdermill Nature Reserve in Pennsylvania. The program consisted of half-day sessions for children 8–13 years old. Scott also served as a Bioscience center director at Powdermill from 1964-1971.

=== State ===
Scott's statewide involvements included the Pennsylvania Air Pollution Commission, Pennsylvania Roadside Council, the Garden Club Federation of Pennsylvania, and acted as conservation advisor to the Highway Department on vegetation management.

=== National ===
Scott spent time in the White House in 1962 and 1965 where she attended the Conference on Conservation and the Conference on National Beauty. She also worked with governmental agencies such as Department of Environmental Resources and the Department of Agriculture. She was president of the American Nature Study Society and a founder of the Right of Way Resources of America.

=== Relationship to Rachel Carson ===
Due to her close ties with Rachel Carson during her life, Scott was an executive committee member of the Rachel Carson Trust for the Living Environment from 1965-1973. She also worked to acquire the childhood home and property of Rachel Carson in hopes that the site would serve as a museum and memorial to Carson's work. Similarly to Carson, Scott worked to educate others about the deadly effects of chemical pesticides.

=== Marriage ===
In 1950, Ruth Jury married J. Lewis Scott, who was a geological mapper for Gulf Oil. Both Ruth and J. Lewis shared a love for the environment and were known for planting seeds, specifically for apple trees, while traveling or walking anywhere new. Further, they worked to plant 1,500 White spruce and Pine trees on two hills behind their house.

=== Death ===
Ruth Jury Scott died on June 18, 2003, at the age of 94.
