= 1829 in Ireland =

- Centuries: 17th; 18th; 19th; 20th; 21st
- Decades: 1800s; 1810s; 1820s; 1830s; 1840s
- See also: 1829 in the United Kingdom; Other events of 1829; List of years in Ireland

Events from the year 1829 in Ireland.

== Events ==
- 13 April – the Roman Catholic Relief Act, granting Catholic emancipation, becomes law, thanks to Daniel O'Connell and the Catholic Association. Roman Catholics are eligible to sit in the Parliament of the United Kingdom of Great Britain and Ireland and in the judiciary. However, Forty Shilling Freeholders are disenfranchised by raising the value of the property qualification to vote in county constituencies to ten pounds.
- 6 May – new Roman Catholic Newry Cathedral dedicated.
- 12 July – Orange Institution parades in Belfast are banned, leading to demonstrations and serious rioting in Belfast. This spreads to County Armagh and County Tyrone, lasting several days and resulting in at least 20 deaths.
- Congregational Union of Ireland founded.

== Arts and literature ==
- Irish sculptor John Hogan in Rome carves the first version of The Dead Christ.
- Gerald Griffin's novel The Collegians is published.

== Births ==
- 7 January – James Hinks, dog breeder (died 1878).
- 16 February – Matthew Cooke, economic entomologist in California (died 1887).
- 26 March – Thomas Kingsmill Abbott, scholar and educator (died 1913).
- 6 April – Anna Haslam, née Fisher, women's rights activist, suffragist (died 1922).
- 6 May – Margaret Anna Cusack, religious sister (died 1899).
- 10 May – John Joseph Hogan, first Bishop of the Dioceses of Saint Joseph, Missouri and Kansas City, Missouri (died 1913).
- 15 May – Alexander Martin Sullivan, journalist, politician and lawyer (died 1884).
- 29 May – Thomas Henry Burke, Permanent Under Secretary at the Irish Office, assassinated in the Phoenix Park Murders (died 1882).
- 3 August – Henry Benedict Medlicott, geologist (died 1905).
- 5 August – William Coffey, soldier, recipient of the Victoria Cross for gallantry in 1855 at Sebastopol, the Crimea (died 1875).
- 20 November – Charles Graham Halpine, journalist, editor and author (died 1868).
- 29 December – Ulick Joseph Bourke, scholar and writer who founded the Gaelic Union (died 1887).
  Full date unknown
  - Garrett Byrne, Irish nationalist and MP (died 1897).
  - William Henry Lynn, architect (died 1915).

== Deaths ==
- 28 January (hanged in Edinburgh) – William Burke, murderer (born 1792).
- 14 March – Francis Johnston, architect (born 1760).
- 21 April – William Edgeworth, civil engineer (born 1794?).
- June – James Magauran, Roman Catholic Bishop of Ardagh and Clonmacnoise (born 1769/71).
- 8 October – Patrick Kelly, Roman Catholic Bishop of Waterford and Lismore (born 1779).
- December – St George Daly, lawyer (born 1758).
- Jeremiah Joseph Callanan, poet and teacher (born 1795).

== See also ==
- 1829 in Scotland
- 1829 in Wales
