= 1763 in Ireland =

- Centuries: 16th; 17th; 18th; 19th; 20th
- Decades: 1740s; 1750s; 1760s; 1770s; 1780s
- See also: Other events of 1763; List of years in Ireland

Events from the year 1763 in Ireland.

== Incumbent ==
- Monarch: George III

== Events ==
- April – a presbytery of the Reformed Presbyterian Church of Ireland, separate from that in Scotland, is organised.
- 16 April – John Butler is appointed Roman Catholic Bishop of Cork.
- September – a loaded barge passes from Belfast to Lisburn inaugurating the Lagan Navigation.
- 10 September – the Freeman's Journal newspaper begins publication in Dublin, established by three merchants under the management of Henry Brooke with contributions by the radical politician Charles Lucas and initially in support of the Protestant Ascendancy.

== Births ==
- 1 February – Thomas Campbell, Presbyterian minister (died 1854 in the United States).
- 21 March – William James MacNeven, physician and writer (died 1841 in the United States).
- 20 May – William Wellesley-Pole, 3rd Earl of Mornington, politician (died 1845).
- 20 June – Wolfe Tone, leading figure in the United Irishmen and the Irish Rebellion of 1798 (died 1798).
- 4 July – Arthur O'Connor, United Irishman and later general in Napoleon's army (died 1852).
- 15 October – Lord Edward FitzGerald, soldier, explorer space United Irishman active in the Irish Rebellion of 1798 (died 1798).
- Christopher Dillon Bellew, landowner and campaigner for Catholic emancipation (died 1826).
- Denis Browne, politician (died 1828).
- William Higgins, chemist (died 1825).
- John Moore, President of the Republic of Connacht during the Irish Rebellion of 1798 (died 1799).
- Alexander Pope, actor and miniature painter (died 1835).

== Deaths ==
- 4 April – Marcus Beresford, 1st Earl of Tyrone, politician (born 1694).
- 3 September – Thomas Carter, politician (born 1690).
- Dudley Bradstreet, adventurer (born 1711).
- James MacGeoghegan, Roman Catholic priest and historian (born 1702).
