= 1821 in Ireland =

- Centuries: 17th; 18th; 19th; 20th; 21st
- Decades: 1800s; 1810s; 1820s; 1830s; 1840s
- See also: 1821 in the United Kingdom; Other events of 1821; List of years in Ireland

Events from the year 1821 in Ireland.

== Events ==
- 12 August – 3 September: the newly crowned King George IV of the United Kingdom lands at Howth to become the first monarch to pay a state visit to Ireland since the 14th century. He stays at the Viceregal Lodge in Dublin; with his mistress Elizabeth Conyngham, Marchioness Conyngham, at Slane Castle; and with Viscount Powerscourt at Powerscourt House. He departs from Dunleary which is renamed Kingstown in his honour.
- September–November – potato crop fails.
- 28 December – Sandycove lifeboat disaster – four lifeboatmen drown attempting to rescue Ellen of Liverpool.
- Metal Man seamark erected at Rosses Point.
- Loreto Abbey established by Sisters of Loreto at Rathfarnham.

== Arts and literature ==
- 18 January – the Albany New Theatre opens in Dublin. In August, King George IV attends a performance, following which it becomes Dublin's second Theatre Royal.
- John Banim's poem The Celt's Paradise is published, and his play Damon and Pythias is first performed (at the Theatre Royal, Covent Garden) on 28 May.
- Whitely Stokes publishes a critique of Thomas Malthus's reflections on Ireland: Observations on the population and resources of Ireland, Dublin, Joshua Porter

== Births ==
- 20 January – Dennis Mahony, co-founder of the Herald newspaper in Dubuque, Iowa (died 1879 in the United States).
- February (possible date) – Robert O'Hara Burke, explorer of Australia (died 1861 in Australia).
- 17 February – Lola Montez, born Eliza Rosanna Gilbert, "Spanish dancer" and royal mistress (died 1861 in the United States).
- 20 February – Miles Gerard Keon, journalist, novelist, colonial secretary and lecturer (died 1875).
- 21 February – "Roaring" Hugh Hanna, Evangelical preacher (died 1892).
- 8 March – James Sheridan Muspratt, research chemist and teacher (died 1871).
- 28 March – William Howard Russell, journalist (died 1907).
- 6 May – Robert O'Hara Burke, explorer of Australia (died 1861 in Australia).
- 20 July – Michael Hannan, Archbishop in Roman Catholic Archdiocese of Halifax, Nova Scotia (died 1882 in Canada).
- 22 September – John Conness, United States Senator from California, 1863–1869 (died 1909 in the United States).
- 18 December – William Connor Magee, Anglican clergyman, Archbishop of York (died 1891).
- 21 December – Samuel Haughton, scientific writer (died 1897).
- 27 December – Jane Francesca Elgee, later Lady Wilde, poet ("Esperanza"; died 1896).
- Date unknown – Joseph Robinson Kirk, sculptor (died 1894).

== Deaths ==
- 6 April – Robert Stewart, 1st Marquess of Londonderry, politician (born 1739).
- 15 June – James Cuffe, 1st Baron Tyrawley, peer (born 1747).
- 4 October – Edward Hudson, dentist (born 1743).
- 15 November – John Barrett, clergyman and Hebrew scholar (born 1753).
- 17 December – Denis Bowes Daly, politician (born c. 1745).

== See also ==
- 1821 in Scotland
- 1821 in Wales
