= 1830 in Ireland =

- Centuries: 17th; 18th; 19th; 20th; 21st
- Decades: 1810s; 1820s; 1830s; 1840s; 1850s
- See also: 1830 in the United Kingdom; Other events of 1830; List of years in Ireland

Events from the year 1830 in Ireland.

== Events ==
- February – first Roman Catholics take their seats in the House of Commons at Westminster, among them Daniel O'Connell (for County Clare) and Richard More O'Ferrall (County Kildare).
- 12 July – Orange Institution parades lead to confrontations between Orangemen and Ribbonmen in Maghera and Castledawson in County Londonderry. Several Catholic homes are burned by Protestants following these clashes.
- July – potato crop failure the previous year leads to widespread famine. Food riots in Limerick and Leitrim.
- August – first Dublin Horse Show.
- November – Ribbonmen attack an Orange band, puncturing some of their drums. The Orangemen retaliate by burning the Catholic village of Maghery, County Armagh, to the ground.
  Undated
  - The Remonstrant Synod of Ulster is formed by non-subscribing Presbyterians.
  - T. & A. Mulholland open the 8000-spindle York Street flax mill in Belfast.
  - Austins established in the Diamond, Derry. At closure in 2016 it will be the world's oldest independent department store.
  - Sir Jonah Barrington (being resident in France to avoid his creditors) is removed from the judiciary following an Address to the King by both Houses of Parliament, a unique event.
  - William Carleton publishes Traits and Stories of the Irish Peasantry and Confessions of a Reformed Ribbonman, a fictionalised account of the Wildgoose Lodge Murders of 1816.
  - The private Markree Observatory is set up.

== Births ==
- 1 January – William James Lendrim, soldier, recipient of the Victoria Cross for gallantry in 1855 at the Siege of Sevastopol, Crimea (died 1891).
- 10 April – John Sullivan, recipient of the Victoria Cross for gallantry in 1855 at Sebastopol, in the Crimea (died 1884).
- 12 May – Maurice O'Rorke, politician and Speaker of the New Zealand House of Representatives (died 1916).
- 25 May – Hugh Nelson, politician in Canada and Lieutenant-Governor of British Columbia (died 1893).
- 23 July – John O' Leary, Fenian poet (died 1907).
- 12 August – John O'Connor, painter (died 1889).
- 29 August – Charles Bowen, politician in New Zealand (died 1917).
- 16 September – Patrick Francis Moran, third Archbishop of Sydney (died 1911).
- 20 September – Arthur Thomas Moore, soldier, recipient of the Victoria Cross for gallantry in 1857 at the Battle of Khushab, Persia (died 1913).
- 20 September – Hans Garrett Moore, soldier, recipient of the Victoria Cross for gallantry in 1877 at Komgha, South Africa (died 1889).
- October – John Connors, soldier, recipient of the Victoria Cross for gallantry in 1855 at Sebastopol in the Crimea (died 1857).
- 22 November – Justin McCarthy, politician, historian and novelist (died 1912).
- 24 December – Harry Hammon Lyster, recipient of the Victoria Cross for gallantry in 1858 at Calpee, India (died 1922).
  Full date unknown
  - Brian Dillon, Fenian leader (d. c1872).
  - Robert Dwyer Joyce, music collector and writer (died 1883).
  - Charles McCorrie, soldier, recipient of the Victoria Cross for gallantry in 1855 at Sebastopol, in the Crimea (died 1857).
  - William R. Roberts, diplomat, Fenian Society member and United States Representative from New York (died 1897).
  - Eyre Massey Shaw, superintendent of the (London) Metropolitan Fire Brigade (died 1908).

== Deaths ==
- 26 June – George IV of the United Kingdom of Great Britain and Ireland (born 1762).
- 11 October – Richard John Uniacke, lawyer, politician, member of Nova Scotia Legislative Assembly and Attorney General of Nova Scotia (born 1753).

== See also ==
- 1830 in Scotland
- 1830 in Wales
- 1830 in United Kingdom
