= 1759 in Ireland =

- Centuries: 16th; 17th; 18th; 19th; 20th
- Decades: 1730s; 1740s; 1750s; 1760s; 1770s
- See also: Other events of 1759; List of years in Ireland

Events from the year 1759 in Ireland.

== Incumbent ==
- Monarch: George II

== Events ==
- Restrictions on import of Irish cattle into England are removed.
- Henry Flood enters the Parliament of Ireland as a member for Kilkenny.
- Planned French Invasion of Britain: France considers offering the Kingdom of Ireland to a Stuart pretender.
- Formation of the Irish Catholic Committee, of Dublin merchants and professionals loyal to the British monarchy.
- 31 December – Arthur Guinness leases the St. James's Gate Brewery in Dublin.

== Arts and literature ==
- West front of Trinity College Dublin on College Green completed by architects Henry Keene and John Sanderson.

== Births ==
- 5 March – Thomas Bray, Roman Catholic Archbishop of Cashel (died 1820).
- 9 September – Hercules Taylour, soldier and politician (died 1790).
- Adam Buck, miniaturist and portrait painter (died 1833 in London).
- James Craig, politician (died 1833).
- Charles Osborne, lawyer and politician (died 1817).
- Approximate date
  - Sir James Galbraith, 1st Baronet, politician (died 1827).
  - Robert Philson, soldier and politician in the United States (died 1831).

== Deaths ==
- 16 February – Bartholomew Mosse, surgeon, impresario, founded the Rotunda Hospital in Dublin (born 1712).
- Richard Pockrich, inventor of the Angelic organ (born c. 1690).
- Henry Singleton, judge (born 1682).
