= 1828 in Ireland =

- Centuries: 17th; 18th; 19th; 20th; 21st
- Decades: 1800s; 1810s; 1820s; 1830s; 1840s
- See also: 1828 in the United Kingdom; Other events of 1828; List of years in Ireland

The following events occurred in Ireland in the year 1828.

== Events ==
- In the election in County Clare, Daniel O'Connell wins the seat, with the Catholic Association.
- Belfast Botanic Gardens opens as the private Royal Belfast Botanical Gardens.
- Kings Bridge opens across the River Liffey in Dublin.

== Births ==
- 1 January – Richard Phelan, fourth Roman Catholic Bishop of Pittsburgh, Pennsylvania (died 1904 in the United States).
- 17 January – Eyre Massey Shaw, first Chief Officer of the Metropolitan Fire Brigade (London) (died 1908 in England).
- 28 January – William Gorman Wills, dramatist and painter (died 1891).
- 21 March – William Davis Ardagh, lawyer, judge and politician in Canada (died 1893 in the United States).
- March – Patrick Cleburne, major general in Confederate States Army in the American Civil War (killed at the Battle of Franklin, 1864 in the United States).
- 23 April – Fenton John Anthony Hort, theologian and writer (died 1892).
- 28 April – Wingfield W. Watson, leader of the Church of Jesus Christ of Latter Day Saints (Strangite) (died 1922 in the United States).
- 9 May – Charles Kickham, Irish revolutionary, novelist, poet, journalist (died 1882).
- 11 May – William Walsh, U.S. Congressman in Maryland (died 1892 in the United States).
- 15 June – Thomas Newenham Deane, architect (died 1899).
- 27 June
  - Cornelius Coughlan, soldier, recipient of the Victoria Cross for gallantry in 1857 at Delhi, India (died 1915).
  - Bryan O'Loghlen, politician in Australia, 13th Premier of Victoria (died 1905 in Australia).
- 26 August – William Plunket, 4th Baron Plunket, Church of Ireland Archbishop of Dublin (died 1897).
- 22 September – Canon James Goodman, Irish music collector (died 1896).
- 22 November – Lydia Shackleton, botanical artist (died 1914).
- 27 November – Samuel Mullen, bookseller (died 1890).
- 31 December – Fitz James O'Brien, author (died 1862).
  Full date unknown
  - John Holmes, surveyor and politician in Ontario (died 1879 in New Zealand).
  - Joshua Spencer Thompson, Liberal-Conservative politician in Canada (died 1880 in Canada).

== Deaths ==
- 9 January – Alexander Arbuthnot, Church of Ireland Bishop of Killaloe (born 1768).
- 29 June – Samuel Forde, painter from Cork (born 1805).
- 23 August – John Foster, 1st Baron Oriel, politician and Irish Chancellor of the Exchequer (born 1740).

== See also ==
- 1828 in Scotland
- 1828 in Wales
