= 1760 in Ireland =

- Centuries: 16th; 17th; 18th; 19th; 20th
- Decades: 1740s; 1750s; 1760s; 1770s; 1780s
- See also: Other events of 1760; List of years in Ireland

Events from the year 1760 in Ireland.

== Incumbent ==
- Monarch: George II (until 25 October), then George III

== Events ==
- 21–26 February – Battle of Carrickfergus: A force of French troops under the command of privateer François Thurot captures and holds the town and castle of Carrickfergus before retiring; the force is defeated (and Thurot killed) in the naval Battle of Bishops Court in the Irish Sea on 28 February.
- 25 October – George III becomes King of Great Britain and Ireland upon the death of George II.
- A Patriot Party under the leadership of Henry Flood, appears in the Irish House of Representatives.

== Births ==
- 28 January – Mathew Carey, publisher and economist in the United States (d. 1839).
- 14 June – George Forbes, 6th Earl of Granard, general (d. 1837).
- 20 September – John Keating, soldier and land developer (d. 1853).
- Jerome Alley, clergyman and writer (d. 1826).
- Thomas Barnes Gough, merchant and politician in Upper Canada (d. 1815).
- Francis Johnston, architect (d. 1829).
- James Cavanah Murphy, architect and antiquary (d. 1814).
- Edmond Stanley, lawyer and politician (d. 1843).
- Approximate date – Oliver Bond, merchant and revolutionary (d. 1798).

== Deaths ==
- 26 March – Margaret Woffington, actress (b. c1720).
- 23 September – Sir Thomas Prendergast, 2nd Baronet, politician.
- 25 October – George II, King of Great Britain and Ireland; Elector of Hanover; Duke of Brunswick-Lüneburg (born 1683)
  Full date unknown
  - Patrick Cotter O'Brien, known as the Bristol Giant and the Irish Giant (died 1806).
