= Joseph W. Carey =

Joseph William Carey ARUA (1859–1937) was an Irish artist.

Joseph was the son of the Rev. J. W. Carey, the minister of the Moravian Church in Kilwarlin, County Down. He trained as an illustrator with Marcus Ward & Co., publishers. When this firm failed in 1899, he set up a business with his brother John Carey and Ernest Hanford at 142 Royal Avenue in Belfast, where they were joined later by Richard Thomson (brother of the noted illustrator Hugh Thomson, who had trained at Marcus Ward with Carey). Their firm specialised in high quality illuminated addresses, presentation albums, and book plates.

Carey's most important commission as an artist was for 13 scenes from Belfast history on canvas for the Ulster Hall in 1903. These were restored in 1989 and 2009. Between 1915–35, 26 of his paintings were exhibited at the Royal Hibernian Academy in Dublin. He was a founding member of Belfast Ramblers Sketching Club and Belfast Art Society, and later he became an academician of the Ulster Academy of Arts. His other interests included ballooning and chess.

Percy French and Hugh Thomson were both lifelong friends and frequent visitors to Carey's house at Knock. Examples of his work are in the Ulster Museum, Ulster Folk and Transport Museum, Armagh County Museum, Linen Hall Library, and Harbour Commissioners Office.

A historical plaque is set at his home at 31 Knockdene Park Belfast.
