= 1757 in Ireland =

- Centuries: 16th; 17th; 18th; 19th; 20th
- Decades: 1730s; 1740s; 1750s; 1760s; 1770s
- See also: Other events of 1757; List of years in Ireland

Events from the year 1757 in Ireland.

== Incumbent ==
- Monarch: George II

== Events ==
- Catholic Committee, to press for repeal of the penal laws against Roman Catholics, is established by Charles O'Conor, John Curry and Mr. Wyse of Waterford. O'Conor publishes The Protestant Interest of Ireland Considered.
- September 26 – St Patrick's Hospital for Imbeciles, Dublin, established under the will of Jonathan Swift, accepts its first patients
- December 8 – the Rotunda Hospital opens in Dublin.
- December 31 – the title of Viscount Ligonier of Enniskillen is created in the Peerage of Ireland in favour of Field Marshal John Ligonier.
- Kilbeggan Distillery established.

== Births ==
- 15 May – John Hely-Hutchinson, 2nd Earl of Donoughmore, soldier and politician (died 1832)
- 17 March – Alexander Knox, theological writer (died 1831)
- Approximate date – Jonah Barrington, judge and memoirist (died 1834 in France)

== Deaths ==
- 10 June – Henry Temple, 1st Viscount Palmerston, politician (born c.1673)
- 16 July – Chichester Fortescue, politician (born 1718)
- 3 November – Lieutenant colonel George Monro, army officer (born 1700)
- Sampson Towgood Roch, miniature painter (died 1847)
- William Saurin, lawyer and politician (died 1839)
