= 1756 in Ireland =

- Centuries: 16th; 17th; 18th; 19th; 20th
- Decades: 1730s; 1740s; 1750s; 1760s; 1770s
- See also: Other events of 1756; List of years in Ireland

Events from the year 1756 in Ireland.

== Incumbent ==
- Monarch: George II

== Events ==
- 30 May – the Roman Catholic Diocese of Ardagh and Clonmacnoise is formed by merger of the Bishopric of Ardagh with that of Clonmacnoise. Augustine Cheevers serves as first bishop until August when he is succeeded by Anthony Blake.
- The title Earl of Lanesborough is created in the Peerage of Ireland in favour of Humphrey Butler, 2nd Viscount Lanesborough.
- The title Earl of Shannon is created in the Peerage of Ireland in favour of the politician Henry Boyle.
- Charles Bingham was appointed High Sheriff of Mayo

== Arts and literature ==
- May – the dramatic poem Leucothoé becomes Isaac Bickerstaffe's first published work.

== Births ==
- 29 January – Richard Hely-Hutchinson, 1st Earl of Donoughmore, politician (died 1825)
- 30 June – Charles FitzGerald, 1st Baron Lecale, politician (died 1810)
- July – John Hamilton, 1st Marquess of Abercorn, politician (died 1818)
- 25 July (probable date) – Elizabeth Hamilton, Scottish essayist, poet, satirist and novelist (died 1816 in England)

== Deaths ==
- Approximate date – Cathal Buí Mac Giolla Ghunna, poet (born c.1680)
