= 1820 in Ireland =

- Centuries: 17th; 18th; 19th; 20th; 21st
- Decades: 1800s; 1810s; 1820s; 1830s; 1840s
- See also: 1820 in the United Kingdom; Other events of 1820; List of years in Ireland

Events from the year 1820 in Ireland.

== Events ==
- 30 January – Irish-born Royal Navy captain Edward Bransfield in the Williams is the first person positively to identify Antarctica as a land mass.
- 12 February – the East Indian and Fanny set sail from Cork with settlers for the Cape Colony.
- 6 May – failure of Newport's Bank in Waterford.
- 25 May – failure of Roche's Bank and stoppage of Leslie's Bank in Cork.
- 3 June – the Roman Catholic Cathedral of St Mary and St Anne in Cork is largely destroyed by arson.
- 8 July – act for lighting the city and suburbs of Dublin with gas.
- 20 July – Saint Cronan's Boys' National School opens in Bray, County Wicklow, as the Bray Male School.
- December – Lough Allen Canal, giving through navigation between Carrick-on-Shannon and Lough Allen, opens.
- The Royal Dublin Society adopts its "Royal" prefix when the new king George IV of the United Kingdom becomes its patron.
- Suspension of construction of the Wellington Testimonial, Dublin, in Phoenix Park to the design of Robert Smirke.
- First steamship on the Irish Sea crossing from Dublin to Liverpool, the Waterloo, introduced by George Langtry of Belfast.
- Frederick Bourne begins to create the village of Ashbourne, County Meath.
- Publication of James Hardiman's The History of the Town and County of the Town of Galway, from the earliest period to the present time in Dublin.
- Denny Meats are founded.
- St. John's Church is built in Ballymore Eustace, County Kildare.

== Arts and literature ==
- Charles Maturin (anonymously) publishes Melmoth the Wanderer.
- Regina Maria Roche publishes The Munster Cottage Boy: a Tale.

== Births ==
- 19 February – John Tuigg, third Roman Catholic Bishop of Pittsburgh, Pennsylvania (died 1889 in the United States).
- 31 May – Timothy Burns, Lieutenant Governor of Wisconsin from 1851 to 1853 (died 1853).
- 3 June – Thomas William Moffett, scholar, educationalist and president of Queen's College Galway (died 1908).
- 4 June – John Kean, businessman and politician in Ontario (died 1892).
- 2 August – John Tyndall, physicist (died 1893).
- 6 October – James Travers, soldier, recipient of the Victoria Cross for gallantry in 1857 at Indore, India (died 1884).
- 22 November – Katherine Plunket, botanical artist and longest-lived Irish person ever (died 1932).
- 30 December – Mary Anne Sadlier, novelist (died 1903).
  Full date unknown
  - Thomas Bellew, Galway landowner and politician (died 1863).
  - John F. Kennedy's great-grandfather was born in the village of Dunganstown in County Wexford.
  - Johnston Drummond, early settler of Western Australia, botanical and zoological collector (died 1845).
  - Ambrose Madden, recipient of the Victoria Cross for gallantry in 1854 in the Crimea, at Little Inkerman (died 1863).
  - Patrick Mylott, soldier, recipient of the Victoria Cross for gallantry in 1857 in India (died 1878).
  - Henry Hamilton O'Hara "Mad O'hara", "The Mad Squire of Craigbilly" (died 1875).
  - Kivas Tully, architect (died 1905).

== Deaths ==
- 29 January – George III of the United Kingdom of Great Britain and Ireland (born 1738).
- 5 February – William Drennan, physician, poet, educationalist and co-founder of the Society of United Irishmen (born 1754).
- 13 February – Leonard McNally, informant against members of the Society of United Irishmen (born 1752).
- 20 March – Eaton Stannard Barrett, poet and author (born 1786).
- 6 June – Henry Grattan, member of Irish House of Commons and campaigner for legislative freedom for the Irish Parliament (born 1746).
- Undated – Anthony Daly, a leader of the Whiteboy movement, hanged for attempted murder.

== See also ==
- 1820 in Scotland
- 1820 in Wales
