= 1755 in Ireland =

- Centuries: 16th; 17th; 18th; 19th; 20th
- Decades: 1730s; 1740s; 1750s; 1760s; 1770s
- See also: Other events of 1755; List of years in Ireland

Events from the year 1755 in Ireland.

== Incumbent ==
- Monarch: George II

== Events ==
- 10 April – Essex Bridge across the river Liffey in Dublin is opened to carriage traffic.
- 1 November – the Spanish Arch in Galway is partially destroyed by a tsunami generated by the Lisbon earthquake which is felt across Munster.
- The Commissioners of Inland Navigation order commencement of work on making the River Shannon navigable.
- The Artillery Company of Ireland, predecessor of the Royal Irish Artillery, is formed.
- Completion of Russborough House, County Wicklow, designed in the Palladian style by Richard Cassels for Joseph Leeson, 1st Earl of Milltown.
- Kilwarlin Moravian Church is founded in County Down by the evangelist John Cennick.

== Births ==
- 14 May – George Barrington, pickpocket, socialite, Australian pioneer and author (died 1804 in Australia)
- 7 June – Isidore Lynch, soldier (died 1841)
- 24 June – John Glendy, Presbyterian minister (died 1832 in the United States)
- 8 July – James Blackwood, 2nd Baron Dufferin and Claneboye, politician (died 1836)
- John Handcock, soldier and politician (died 1786)
- John Proby Osborne, lawyer and politician (died 1787)
- Owen Wynne, landowner and politician (died 1841)
- Approximate date
  - Joseph Allison, farmer and politician in Nova Scotia (died 1806)
  - Joseph Marshall, farmer, judge and politician in Nova Scotia (died 1847)

== Deaths ==
- 16 March – Edward Southwell, politician (born 1705)
- 25 September – Luke Gardiner, property developer and politician (born c.1690)
- William Richardson, politician.
