= 1888 in Ireland =

- Centuries: 17th; 18th; 19th; 20th; 21st
- Decades: 1860s; 1870s; 1880s; 1890s; 1900s
- See also: 1888 in the United Kingdom; Other events of 1888; List of years in Ireland

Events from the year 1888 in Ireland.

== Events ==
- January – the Chaine Memorial at Larne is completed.
- March – the Pan-Celtic Society is founded by W. B. Yeats.
- April – Pope Leo XIII issues a decree denouncing the "Plan of Campaign" as the Holy Office issues a rescript to the Bishops of the Catholic Church in Ireland to boycott the Campaign. This is ignored by many.
- 4 June–27 October – Irish Exhibition at Olympia (London).
- 20 August – the Christian Brothers College is founded in Cork.
- September
  - James Joyce enters the Clongowes Wood College as the school's youngest student.
  - (approx. date) James Connolly deserts from his British Army regiment in Dublin and moves to Dundee.
- Irish members of the British House of Commons attempt to introduce an Irish Local Government Bill; however the Bill is opposed by Chief Secretary Arthur Balfour.
- Belfast is awarded city status by Queen Victoria.
- The Belfast Central Library is founded.
- A large flock of 110 Pallas's sandgrouse, a rare species of birds in Ireland, is recorded, one of the last known migrations witnessed in Ireland.
- W. B. Yeats joins the Esoteric Section of the Theosophical Society.
- James Daly sells the Connaught Telegraph to employee T. H. Gillespie.
- Thomas Lindsay Buick becomes Secretary of the Gladstone branch of the Irish National League.
- Reverend Henry Lett publishes a research paper on several unknown forms of fungi found in Ulster; however this document, as well as other research by Lett, is later lost.
- Letitia Alice Walkington became the first woman in the United Kingdom to receive a degree of Bachelor of Laws, from the Royal University of Ireland at Queen's College, Belfast.

== Arts and literature ==
- 10 May – J. M. Synge arrives in the Aran Islands for his first visit.
- William Allingham publishes Laurence Bloomfield or rich and poor in Ireland.
- J. E. Gore publishes A revised catalogue of variable stars.
- William Henry Hulbert publishes Ireland Under Coercion.
- John Kells Ingram publishes A history of political economy and Essays in political economy.
- T. Dumbar Ingram publishes Two Chapters of Irish History.
- MacGregor Mathers publishes Qabbalah Unveiled.
- Kuno Meyer publishes The Wooing of Emer.
- George Moore publishes Spring Days.
- 'Esperanza' (Jane, Lady Wilde) publishes Ancient Legends, Mystic Charms, and Superstitions of Ireland, with sketches of the Irish past.
- Oscar Wilde publishes The Happy Prince.
- W. B. Yeats publishes Fairy and Folk Tales of the Irish Peasantry and writes Down by the Salley Gardens.
- Fossett's Circus begins touring Ireland nationally. It has continued without a break since then making it one of the oldest continuously touring circuses in the world.

== Sport ==
=== Cricket ===
- Several Irish Cricket Teams travel for their second tour of Canada and the United States.

=== Football ===
- International
  3 March Wales 11–0 Ireland (in Wrexham)
  24 March Ireland 2–10 Scotland (in Belfast)
  7 April Ireland 1–5 England (in Belfast)
  Irish Cup
  Winners: Cliftonville 2–1 Distillery
- Distillery win the Irish Junior Cup.

=== Gaelic Games ===
- Several Cavan GAA football teams are formed including the Kildallan Wolfe Tones, Castletara, Butlersbridge Emmets, Drumlane sons of O'Connell, Ballintemple Bob Sextons, Ballinagh Erins Hope, Bawnboy Gallowglasses, Milltown Owen Roes, Arva Michael Davitts, and the Cavan Slashers.
- April – the First Cavan GAA All Ireland Finals is held in Birr.
- 7 April – a Cavan GAA football game between the Cavan Slashers and Belturbet Rory O'Moores is reported by an Anglo-Celt reporter as "...A disgrace, I must state that a more rowdy and disgraceful meeting I have never witnessed and the conduct of the party that came along with the Cavan club was simply what I could not wish to describe" and "The filthy expressions used by them towards the Rory O'Moores is simply not fit for publication".
- 30 April – the first Cavan GAA County Championship Final is played at Cavan as the Maghera McFinns defeat the Ballyconnell First Ulster's.

=== Golf ===
- The Royal Portrush Golf Club is founded as The County Club at Portrush, County Antrim.
- The Cork Golf Club is founded at Cork.

=== Horse racing ===
- The Leopardstown Racecourse is established by Captain George Quin becoming the first modern fully enclosed race track.

== Births ==
- 6 January – Séumas Robinson, member of Irish Volunteers and Irish Republican Army (died 1961).
- 7 January – Eugene O'Callaghan, Bishop of Clogher 1943–1969 (died 1973).
- 8 January – Matthew Moore, actor (died 1960).
- 10 February – Michael Joseph MacManus, journalist.

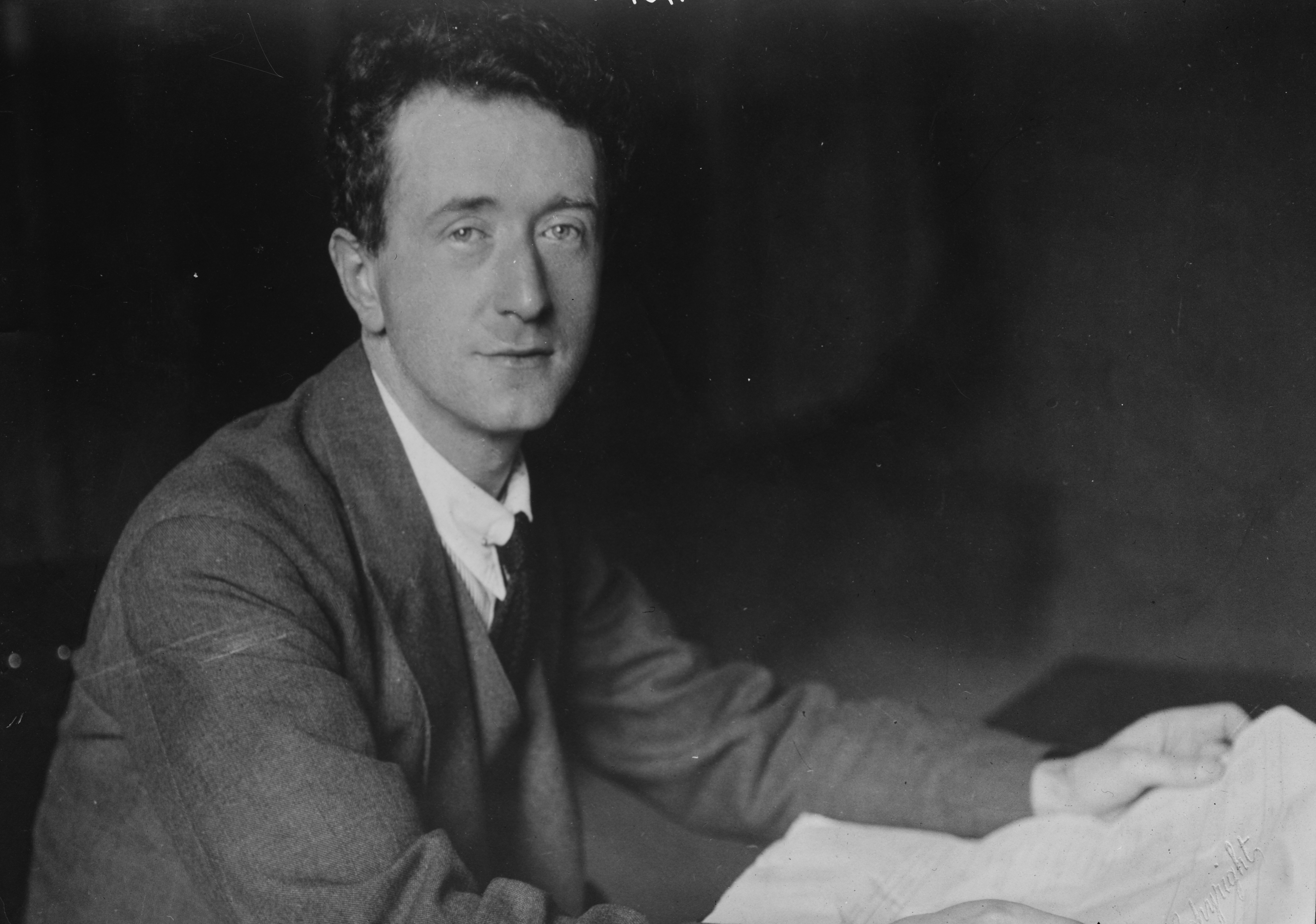
Desmond FitzGerald

- 13 February – Desmond FitzGerald, Sinn Féin MP, TD, Cabinet Minister, Seanad Éireann member and poet, born in London (died 1947).
- 4 March – Grace Gifford Plunkett, Sinn Féin member and politician (died 1955).
- 10 March – Barry Fitzgerald, Academy Award-winning actor (died 1961).
- 8 May – W. F. Marshall, Presbyterian minister and poet (died 1959).
- 18 May – Art O'Connor, Sinn Féin MP, member of First Dáil, cabinet minister, lawyer and judge (died 1950).
- 9 June – Basil Brooke, 1st Viscount Brookeborough, Ulster Unionist Party MP, third Prime Minister of Northern Ireland (died 1973).
- 20 June – Peter Paul Galligan, Sinn Féin MP, member of First Dáil (died 1966)
- 1 July – Linda Kearns MacWhinney, nurse, Sinn Féin member and politician (died 1951).
- 23 July – Ivan Magill, anaesthesiologist (died 1986).
- 12 August – Joseph McGrath, Sinn Féin and later Cumann na nGaedheal TD, racehorse owner and breeder (died 1966).
- 1 October – William Cosgrove, recipient of the Victoria Cross for gallantry in 1915 at the Battle of Gallipoli, Turkey (died 1936).
- 16 October – Edmond Pery, 5th Earl of Limerick, peer and soldier (died 1967).
- 24 October – Francis de Groot, upstager of New South Wales Premier Jack Lang at the 1932 official opening of the Sydney Harbour Bridge (died 1969).
- 1 September – Frederick Maurice Watson Harvey, soldier, recipient of the Victoria Cross for gallantry in 1917 at Guyencourt, France (died 1980).
- 25 September – Harold Jackson, cricketer (died 1979).
- 28 September – Seán Lester, diplomat and last Secretary General of the League of Nations (died 1959).
- 29 September – Michael J. Stack, U.S. Representative from Pennsylvania (died 1960).
- 19 October – Con Colbert, nationalist and rebel, took part in Easter Rising (executed 1916).
- 8 November – Gerald Robert O'Sullivan, recipient of the Victoria Cross for gallantry in 1915 at Gallipoli, Turkey (died 1915).
- 19 November – Seán Moylan, member Irish Volunteers, Sinn Féin and Fianna Fáil TD, Cabinet Minister and Seanad Éireann member (died 1957).
- 7 December – Joyce Cary, novelist and artist (died 1957).

== Deaths ==
- 10 January – Philip Cross, army surgeon, hanged in Cork Jail for the murder of his first wife (born 1825).
- 12 May – John Joseph Lynch, Bishop of Toronto (born 1816).
- 15 October – Frank O'Meara, artist (born 1853).
- 10 November – Thomas Henry Fitzgerald, farmer and politician in Queensland, Australia (born 1824).
- 22 November – John McGovern, soldier, recipient of the Victoria Cross for gallantry in 1857 at Delhi, India (born 1825).
- 1 December – John Divane, soldier, recipient of the Victoria Cross for gallantry in 1857 at Delhi, India (born 1822).

== See also ==
- 1888 in Scotland
- 1888 in Wales
