= 1824 in Ireland =

- Centuries: 17th; 18th; 19th; 20th; 21st
- Decades: 1800s; 1810s; 1820s; 1830s; 1840s
- See also: 1824 in the United Kingdom; Other events of 1824; List of years in Ireland

Events from the year 1824 in Ireland.

== Events ==
- 19 November – Edward Kernan appointed Roman Catholic Bishop of Clogher, in succession to James Murphy, an office he will hold until 1844.
- Foundation of the Northern Banking Company.
- The Ordnance Survey of Ireland is established.
- The UK Weights and Measures Act legally abolishes use of the Irish mile for most official purposes.
- The Shelbourne Hotel is established on St Stephen's Green, Dublin, by Martin Burke.
- Northern Whig newspaper is founded in Belfast.
- Thomas Crofton Croker publishes his first study of Irish folklore, Researches in the South of Ireland.

== Births ==
- 23 April – William Nash, soldier, recipient of the Victoria Cross for gallantry in 1858 at Lucknow, India (died 1875).
- 28 May – Thomas Croke, Roman Catholic Archbishop of Cashel and Emly, founder patron of the Gaelic Athletic Association (died 1902).
- 26 June – William Thomson, 1st Baron Kelvin, mathematical physicist, engineer, and leader in the physical sciences (died 1907).
- August – Thomas Laughnan, soldier, recipient of the Victoria Cross for gallantry in 1857 at Lucknow, India (died 1864).
- 1 December – Thomas Henry Fitzgerald, farmer and politician in Queensland, Australia (died 1888).
- 12 December – William Joseph Corbet, nationalist politician and MP (died 1909).
  Full date unknown
  - John Coghlan, public works engineer in Argentina (died 1890).
  - Patrick Green, soldier, recipient of the Victoria Cross for gallantry in 1857 at Delhi, India (died 1889).
  - John O'Hart, genealogist (died 1902).
  - Charles Irwin, soldier, recipient of the Victoria Cross for gallantry in 1857 at Lucknow, India (died 1873).
  - John Lyons, soldier, recipient of the Victoria Cross for gallantry in 1855 at the siege of Sevastopol in the Crimean War (died 1867).
  - Edward Whelan, politician, one of the Fathers of the Canadian Confederation (died 1867).

== Deaths ==
- 21 January – Charles MacCarthy, soldier in the French, Dutch and British armies, governor of various British territories in West Africa (born 1764).
- 17 April – William Ashford, landscape painter (born 1746 in England).
- 16 June – Walter Thom, journalist (born 1770 in Scotland).
- 24 August – Valentine Quin, 1st Earl of Dunraven and Mount-Earl, peer (born 1752).
- 30 October – Charles Maturin, clergyman, novelist and playwright (born 1782).
- 9 November – Richard Annesley, 2nd Earl Annesley, politician (born 1745).
- 19 November – Bishop James Murphy, Bishop of Clogher 1801–1824 (born 1744).
- 5 December – Thomas McCord, businessman and politician in Lower Canada (born 1750).

== See also ==
- 1824 in Scotland
- 1824 in Wales
