= 1762 in Ireland =

- Centuries: 16th; 17th; 18th; 19th; 20th
- Decades: 1740s; 1750s; 1760s; 1770s; 1780s
- See also: Other events of 1762; List of years in Ireland

Events from the year 1762 in Ireland.

== Incumbent ==
- Monarch: George III

== Events ==
- February – Roman Catholic nobility and gentry offer support to King George III in the Seven Years' War in the Iberian Peninsula.
- 20 March – a French privateer takes six ships off Youghal.
- 30 April – acts grant security to Protestants who have acquired property from Catholics.
- Old St. Thomas's Church, Dublin, in Marlborough Street, is completed.
- Watt distillery in Derry is established; it will produce Tyrconnell (whiskey).

== Arts and literature ==
- 14 May – Charles Macklin's The True-Born Irishman is first performed at the Crow Street Theatre in Dublin.
- Approximate date – James Barry paints Baptism of the King of Cashel.

== Births ==
- 11 January – Andrew Cherry, playwright, songwriter, actor and theatrical manager (died 1812 in Wales).
- 24 February – Gideon Ouseley, Methodism's 'apostle to the Irish' (died 1839).
- 20 May – Eyre Coote, British Army officer (died 1832).
- 1 June – Edmund Ignatius Rice, Roman Catholic missionary and educationalist, founder of the Congregation of Christian Brothers and the Presentation Brothers (died 1844).
- 12 June – Chambré Brabazon Ponsonby-Barker, politician (died 1834).
- 25 December – Michael Kelly, actor, singer and composer (died 1826).
- Henry Browne Hayes, sheriff and abductor (died 1832).
- Approximate date – John Chetwode Eustace, Roman Catholic priest and antiquary (died 1815 in Italy).

== Deaths ==
- 20 February – Chambré Brabazon Ponsonby, politician (born c.1720).
- 20 March – James Cuffe, landowner (born 1707).
- 22 March – Courthorpe Clayton, soldier and courtier.
- September
  - Francesco Geminiani, violinist and composer (born 1687 in Italy).
  - Seán Ó Murchadha, poet.
- 16 November – John Boyle, 5th Earl of Cork, writer (born 1707).
- 30 December – Robert Blakeney, politician (born c.1724).
- Macnamara Morgan, playwright and barrister (born c.1720).
- Charles Smith, topographer and apothecary (born 1715).
