= 1753 in Ireland =

- Centuries: 16th; 17th; 18th; 19th; 20th
- Decades: 1730s; 1740s; 1750s; 1760s; 1770s
- See also: Other events of 1753; List of years in Ireland

Events from the year 1753 in Ireland.

== Incumbent ==
- Monarch: George II

== Events ==
- Renewed dispute over revenue surplus.
- 15 December – Lady Charlotte Cavendish, married to William Cavendish, 4th Duke of Devonshire (future Prime Minister of Great Britain & Ireland), inherits her family's estates, including Lismore Castle, from her father, Richard Boyle, 4th Earl of Cork, bringing them into the Devonshire family.

== Publications ==
- Charles O'Conor – Dissertations on the Ancient History of Ireland.

== Births ==
- 16 November – James McHenry, signer of the United States Constitution from Maryland, third United States Secretary of War (died 1816)
- 22 November – Richard John Uniacke, lawyer, politician, member of Nova Scotia Legislative Assembly and Attorney General of Nova Scotia (died 1830)
- Gilbert Austin, educator, clergyman and author (died 1837)
- John Barrett, clergyman and Hebrew scholar (died 1821)

== Deaths ==
- 11 January – Hans Sloane, physician and collector (born 1660)
- 14 January – George Berkeley, also known as Bishop Berkeley, philosopher and writer (born 1685)
