= 1754 in Ireland =

- Centuries: 16th; 17th; 18th; 19th; 20th
- Decades: 1730s; 1740s; 1750s; 1760s; 1770s
- See also: Other events of 1754; List of years in Ireland

Events from the year 1754 in Ireland.

== Incumbent ==
- Monarch: George II

== Events ==
- 6 March – Thomas Dillon, Richard Ferrall and Co.'s bank failure in Dublin due to fraud, the first of three (1754–1755); the partners abscond to France.
- County of Meath Infirmary established at Navan.

== Arts and literature ==
- 2 March – riot at Smock Alley Theatre in Dublin. Thomas Sheridan, the manager, resigns, and leaves Ireland on 15 September.

== Births ==
- 15 January – Richard Martin, "Humanity Dick", politician and animal rights activist (died 1834)
- 7 May – Adam Averell, Primitive Wesleyan cleric (died 1847)
- 23 May – William Drennan, physician, poet, educationalist and co-founder of the Society of United Irishmen (died 1820)
- 14 July – Robert Ward, politician (died 1831)
- 25 August – Charles Coote, 2nd Baron Castle Coote, politician (died 1823)
- 9 December – Francis Rawdon, politician and military officer (died 1826 at sea)
- Cornelius Heeney, merchant and politician in America (died 1848)
- Patrick O'Kelly, poet and eccentric (died 1835)
- Approximate date – Andrew Todd, fur trader in North America (died 1796)

== Deaths ==
- 2 January – William James Conolly, politician.
- 16 April – Donal O'Sullivan of Dunkerron Castle, County Kerry.
- John K'Eogh, cleric and natural historian (born c.1681)
- Seán Clárach Mac Domhnaill, poet (born 1691)
