= 1914 in Ireland =

- Centuries: 18th; 19th; 20th; 21st
- Decades: 1890s; 1900s; 1910s; 1920s; 1930s
- See also: 1914 in the United Kingdom; 1914 in Northern Ireland; Other events of 1914; List of years in Ireland

Events from the year 1914 in Ireland.

== Events ==
- 17 January – Edward Carson inspected a parade of the East Belfast Regiment of the Ulster Volunteers.
- 20 February – The Fethard-on-Sea life-boat capsized on service off the County Wexford coast: nine crew were lost.
- 26 February – HMHS Britannic, designed as the third and largest Olympic-class ocean liner, was launched at the Harland & Wolff shipyards in Belfast.
- 1 March – Three outbreaks of foot and mouth disease were confirmed in County Cork.
- 9 March – The British Prime Minister proposed to allow the Ulster counties to hold a vote on whether or not to join a Home Rule parliament in Dublin.
- 20 March – Curragh incident: British Army officers stationed in Ireland at the Curragh Camp resigned their commissions rather than be ordered to resist action by Unionist Ulster Volunteers if the Government of Ireland Act ("Third Home Rule Bill") was passed in the Parliament of the United Kingdom. The government backs down and they are reinstated.
- 2 April – Cumann na mBan, the Irish republican women's paramilitary organisation, was formed in Dublin as an auxiliary of the Irish Volunteers.
- 6 April – The second reading of the Home Rule Bill was carried in Westminster.
- 24–25 April – Larne Gun Running: 35,000 rifles and over 3 million rounds of ammunition from a German dealer were landed at Larne, Bangor, and Donaghadee for the Unionist Ulster Volunteers and were quickly distributed around Ulster by motor transport.
- 25 May – the House of Commons of the United Kingdom passed the Government of Ireland Bill.
- 23 June—14 July – the Government of Ireland Bill passed through the House of Lords. It allowed Ulster counties to vote on whether or not they wanted to come under Dublin's jurisdiction. Because of the outbreak of war in Europe and later developments in Ireland, the Act was never implemented in its original form and the wishes of counties Fermanagh and Tyrone were eventually ignored.
- 10 July – The Provisional Government of Ulster met for the first time in the Ulster Hall. It vowed to keep Ulster in trust for the King and the British constitution.
- 21 July – A conference (called on 19 July) was opened at Buckingham Palace by the King. It was hoped that unionists and nationalists attending would break the impasse over Home Rule.
- 24 July – The Buckingham Palace conference ended in failure. Nationalists and Unionists present could not agree in principle or in detail.
- 26 July – Howth gun-running: Former British civil servant and novelist Erskine Childers and his wife Molly sailed into Howth in his yacht Asgard and landed 2,500 guns for the nationalist Irish Volunteers from a German dealer. Troops of the King's Own Scottish Borderers, returning to Dublin having been called out to assist police in attempting to prevent the Volunteers from moving the arms to the city, perpetrated the Bachelor's Walk massacre, firing on a crowd of protestors at Bachelors Walk, killing three; a fourth man died later from bayonet wounds and more than 30 others were injured.
- 4 August – World War I: Declaration of war by the United Kingdom on the German Empire.
- September – The Ulster Division was formed as a division of the British New Army from Ulster Volunteers.
- 18 September – The Government of Ireland Act (the Home Rule Act) received Royal Assent (although George V had contemplated refusing it) but was postponed (as projected on 30 July) for the duration of World War I by the simultaneous Suspensory Act and in practice never came into effect in its original form.
- 20 September – In a speech at Woodenbridge, County Wicklow, John Redmond called on members of the Irish Volunteers to go "wherever the firing line extends". The majority did so, fighting in the 10th and 16th (Irish) Division alongside their volunteer counterparts from the 36th (Ulster) Division; the rump Irish Volunteers split off on 24 September.
- 2 October – German spy Carl Hans Lody was arrested at the Great Southern Hotel, Killarney.
- 18 October – The British Royal Navy's Grand Fleet took shelter in Lough Swilly while Scapa Flow was secured against submarine attack.
- 27 October – World War I: Royal Navy super-dreadnought battleship HMS Audacious (23,400 tons), was sunk off Tory Island, north-west of Ireland, by a minefield laid by the armed German merchant-cruiser Berlin.
- 5 December – The Irish Volunteers appointed a headquarters staff, with Eoin MacNeill as chief of staff.
- Welsh evangelist George Jeffreys established his first church in Belfast, predecessor of the Elim Pentecostal Church.

== Arts and literature ==
- February
  - James Joyce's semi-autobiographical novel A Portrait of the Artist as a Young Man commenced serialization in The Egoist (London).
  - Lord Dunsany's collection Five Plays was published in London.
- 4 February – A staging of George A. Birmingham's comedy General John Regan at Westport Town Hall provoked a riot.
- June – James Joyce's Dubliners, a collection of fifteen short stories depicting the Irish middle classes in and around Dublin during the early 20th century, was published in London.
- Terence MacSwiney's contemporary play The Revolutionist was published (first performed 1921).

== Sports ==
=== Association football ===
==== International ====
- Ireland won the British Home Championship football tournament outright for the first time.
  - 19 January – Wales 1–2 Ireland (in Wrexham)
  - 14 February – England 0–3 Ireland (in Middlesbrough)
  - 14 March – Ireland 1–1 Scotland (in Belfast)
  Irish League
  Winners: Linfield
  Irish Cup
  Winners: Glentoran 3–1 Linfield

=== Golf ===
- Balmoral Golf Club opened in Belfast.

== Births ==
- 15 January – James Flanagan (in Derry), only Roman Catholic Chief Constable of the Royal Ulster Constabulary (died 1999).
- 18 January – Patrick Lindsay, Fine Gael party TD and lawyer (died 1993).
- 23 February – Sheila Galvin, Fianna Fáil party TD (died 1983).
- 10 March – Michael Torrens-Spence, held commissions in the Royal Navy Fleet Air Arm, the Royal Air Force, the British Army, Ulster Special Constabulary and Ulster Defence Regiment (died 2001).
- 30 March – Eamon Kelly, actor (died 2001).
- 28 May – William Blease, Baron Blease, trade unionist and politician (died 2008).
- 19 June – Julia Clifford, fiddle player and traditional musician (died 1997).
- 1 July – John Feenan, footballer (died 1994)
- 10 July – Charles Donnelly, poet, killed at the Jarama Front, Spanish Civil War (died 1937).
- 30 July – Michael Morris, 3rd Baron Killanin, journalist, author, sports official and sixth president of the International Olympic Committee (died 1999).
- 5 August – Charles Cuffe, cricketer (died 1972).
- 10 September – Terence O'Neill, Fourth Prime Minister of Northern Ireland (died 1990).
- 13 September – Michael F. Kitt, Fianna Fáil TD (died 1974).
- 8 November – Jackie Brown, footballer (died 1990).
- 14 November – Joseph Barnes, medical missionary (died 2017).
- 10 December – Séamus Dolan, Cathaoirleach of Seanad Éireann 1977–1981 (died 2010).
- 31 December – Ernest Gébler, writer (died 1998).
  Full date unknown
  - Aidan MacCarthy, doctor, RAF medical officer, captured by the Japanese during the Second World War (died 1992).
  - Eddie McAteer, Nationalist Party (Northern Ireland) MP (died 1986).
  - Sydney Sparkes Orr, Professor of Philosophy at the University of Tasmania (died 1966).

== Deaths ==
- 7 January – Patrick Weston Joyce, historian and musicologist (born 1827).
- 23 February – Thomas McCarthy Fennell, Fenian political prisoner transported to Western Australia (born 1841).
- 4 March – William Hamilton, cricketer (born 1859).
- 25 March – R. J. McMordie, solicitor, politician and Lord Mayor of Belfast (born 1849).
- 31 March – Timothy Daniel Sullivan, journalist, politician and poet, wrote the Irish national hymn God Save Ireland (born 1827).
- 19 May – Frederick James Walker, motor cycle racer, killed at 1914 Isle of Man TT races (born 1876).
- 23 June – Colonel John Burke, soldier in America (born 1838).
- 28 June – Patrick James Foley, politician (born 1836)
- 12 August – John Philip Holland, engineer, developed the first Royal Navy submarine (born 1840).
- 1 September – George Henry Morris, soldier, first commanding officer to lead an Irish Guards battalion into battle, killed in action (born 1872).
- 15 October – Anthony Traill, provost of Trinity College Dublin (born 1838).
- 2 November – Charles FitzClarence, soldier, recipient of the Victoria Cross for gallantry in 1899 near Mafeking, killed in action (born 1865).
- 10 November – Lydia Shackleton, botanical artist (born 1828).
- 22 December – John Nesbitt Kirchhoffer, lawyer and politician in Canada (born 1848).
- 26 December – Thomas Kelly-Kenny, British Army general who served in the Second Boer War (born 1840).
