= 1884 in Ireland =

- Centuries: 17th; 18th; 19th; 20th; 21st
- Decades: 1860s; 1870s; 1880s; 1890s; 1900s
- See also: 1884 in the United Kingdom; Other events of 1884; List of years in Ireland

Events from the year 1884 in Ireland.

== Events ==
- "Dublin Castle scandal" – following a failed libel action, a number of members of the Dublin Castle administration are convicted of participating in male homosexual acts.
- 22 September – HMS Wasp (1880) is wrecked on Tory Island, County Donegal, with the loss of 52 lives and only 6 survivors.
- October – Ballymena, Cushendall and Red Bay Railway taken over by Belfast and Northern Counties Railway.
- 22 October – Isabella Mulvany is one of 9 women to get the first degrees from a university in Great Britain or Ireland, and the first in Ireland. Her degree is granted by the Royal University of Ireland.
- 1 November – Mew Island Lighthouse first illuminated.
- 6 December – Representation of the People Act ("Third Reform Act") extends the franchise uniformly across the U.K. to all male tenants paying a £10 rental or occupying land to that value, and restricts multiple voting; this increases the Irish electorate from 126,000 to 738,000.

== Arts and literature ==
- 18 February – English Jesuit poet Gerard Manley Hopkins takes up a post as professor of Greek and Latin at University College Dublin on St Stephen's Green, where he will remain until his death in 1889 and write his "terrible sonnets".
- 1 October – first free public libraries in Dublin open.

== Sport ==
=== Association Football ===
- International
  26 January Ireland 0–5 Scotland (in Belfast)
  9 February Ireland 0–6 Wales (in Belfast)
  23 February Ireland 1–8 England (in Belfast)
- Irish Cup
  Winners: Distillery 5–0 Wellington Park

=== Gaelic Games ===
Michael Cusack, Maurice Davin and other Gaelic games enthusiasts meet to establish the Gaelic Athletic Association (GAA) on Saturday, November 1, 1884, in Hayes' Hotel, Thurles, County Tipperary.

The following goals are set out:

- To foster and promote the native Irish pastimes.
- To open athletics to all social classes.
- To aid in the establishment of hurling and football clubs and organise inter-county matches.

== Births ==
- 17 February – Amby Power, Clare hurler (died 1960).
- 20 March – Tomás Mac Curtain, Sinn Féin Lord Mayor of Cork (murdered on his 36th birthday by the Black and Tans 1920).
- 21 March – Nora Barnacle, lover, companion, inspiration and wife of James Joyce (died 1951).
- 12 June – James Somers, soldier, recipient of the Victoria Cross for gallantry in 1915 at Gallipoli, Turkey (died 1918).
- 17 June – Patrick Little, Fianna Fáil TD and Cabinet Minister (died 1963).
- 23 June – Val Harris, soccer player and manager.
- 4 July – Mabel McConnell Fitzgerald, republican, suffragette and socialist (died 1958).
- 14 September – Frederick Alfred Pile, soldier and politician (died 1976).
- 4 November – Harry Ferguson, early aviator and developer of the modern agricultural tractor (died 1960).
- 7 November – Patrick Belton, Fianna Fáil and Cumann na nGaedheal TD, President of the anti-communist Irish Christian Front (died 1945).
- 16 December – J. M. Kerrigan, actor (died 1964).
- 17 December – Stanislaus Joyce, scholar and writer, brother of James Joyce (died 1955).
  Full date unknown
  - Dick Doyle, Kilkenny hurler (died 1959).
  - Edward Richards-Orpen, furniture maker and independent member of Seanad Éireann (died 1967).
  - Ernest George Trobridge, architect (died 1942).
  - William J. Twaddell, Ulster Unionist Party MP (assassinated by Irish Republican Army 1922).

== Deaths ==
- 27 February – Peter Paul McSwiney, politician two times Lord Mayor of Dublin, entrepreneur co-owner of the first Dublin's Department store in 1853, which became the Clerys.
- 1 April – James Travers, soldier, recipient of the Victoria Cross for gallantry in 1857 at Indore, India (born 1820).
- 25 June – Philip Gore, 4th Earl of Arran, Anglo-Irish peer and diplomat (born 1801).
- 28 June – John Sullivan, recipient of the Victoria Cross for gallantry in 1855 at Sebastopol, in the Crimea (born 1830).
- 27 July – Eliza Lynch, mistress of Francisco Solano López, president of Paraguay (b. c1835).
- 17 October – Alexander Martin Sullivan, journalist, politician and lawyer (born 1829).
  Full date unknown
  - Richard Fitzgerald, recipient of the Victoria Cross for gallantry in 1857 at Bolandshahr, India (born 1831).

== See also ==
- 1884 in Scotland
- 1884 in Wales
