= 1896 in Ireland =

- Centuries: 17th; 18th; 19th; 20th; 21st
- Decades: 1870s; 1880s; 1890s; 1900s; 1910s
- See also: 1896 in the United Kingdom; Other events of 1896; List of years in Ireland

Events from the year 1896 in Ireland.

== Events ==
- February – the Broighter Gold hoard of prehistoric objects was discovered near Limavady by Tom Nicholl while ploughing.
- 28 March – Tom Gallaher incorporated the Gallaher tobacco business and opened the world's largest tobacco factory in Belfast.
- 29 March – the Royal College of St Patrick, Maynooth was granted the status of pontifical university by charter of the Holy See.
- 16 May – the first electric tram ran on the Dublin tramways system.
- May – James Connolly returned from Edinburgh to Ireland as paid organiser for the Dublin Socialist Club. He founded the Irish Republican Socialist Party.
- 3 June – An expedition organised by the Royal Irish Academy left from Killybegs onboard the Congested Districts Board steamer Granuaile in order to study the island of Rockall. Irish naturalist Robert Lloyd Praeger was onboard, who later described it in his 1937 memoir The Way That I Went. The group attempted to land twice, but due to bad weather had to cancel.

== Full date unknown ==
- John Dillon assumed the leadership of the anti-Parnellite wing of the Home Rule Party.
- An extension was made to Arthur Balfour's Land Act. 1,500 bankrupt estates were made available for sale to tenants.
- Ireland's first motor vehicle laws were introduced.
- The first automobile appeared on the streets of Dublin.
- Restoration of the Church of Ireland's Kildare Cathedral was completed.

== Arts and literature ==
- 20 April – first cinema show in Ireland, at Dan Lowry's Star of Erin Variety Theatre in Dublin.
- The lyrics of The Mountains of Mourne were written by Percy French with music adapted by Houston Collisson.
- Charles Villiers Stanford's comic opera Shamus O'Brien was first performed.

== Sport ==
=== Cricket ===
- International
  February: Tim O'Brien became the first Irish captain of the England cricket team in a match won against South Africa at Port Elizabeth

=== Football ===
- International
  29 February Wales 6–1 Ireland (in Wrexham)
  7 March Ireland 0-2 England (in Belfast)
  28 March Ireland 3-3 Scotland (in Belfast)
  Irish League
  Winners: Distillery
  Irish Cup
  Winners: Distillery 3 - 1 Glentoran

=== Field hockey ===
- International
  2 March: The Ireland women's national field hockey team defeated England 2–0 at Alexandra College in the first ever women's international field hockey match.

=== Tennis ===
- The Championships, Wimbledon
  Harold Mahony won the gentleman's singles Championship
  Olympic Games
  John Pius Boland won gold medals in the men's singles and doubles at the first modern Summer Olympics in Athens (Greece)

== Births ==
- 15 February – Arthur Shields, actor (died 1970).
- March – Martin Joseph Sheehan, soldier and Royal Air Service Observer in World War I, killed in action (died 1918).
- 4 April – Sir Osmond Esmonde, 12th Baronet, diplomat and politician (died 1936).
- 24 April – F. R. Higgins, poet and theatre director (died 1941).
- 9 May – Austin Clarke, poet, playwright and writer (died 1974).
- 22 May – Cyril Fagan, astrologer (died 1970).
- 28 August – Liam O'Flaherty, novelist and short story writer (died 1984).
- 17 September – Oscar Heron, Irish World War I flying ace (died 1933).
- 10 November – Sophie Catherine Theresa Mary Peirce-Evans, later Mary, Lady Heath, aviator, athlete and writer (died 1939).
  Full date unknown
  - Monk Gibbon, poet and author (died 1987).
  - Fiona Plunkett, republican (died 1977).

== Deaths ==
- 10 January – Denis Dempsey, soldier, recipient of the Victoria Cross (born 1826).
- 3 February – Jane Wilde, poet ("Esperanza"; born 1821).
- 4 March – Peter Richard Kenrick, first Catholic archbishop west of the Mississippi River (born 1806).
- 4 May – Timothy Anglin, politician in Canada and Speaker of the House of Commons of Canada (born 1822).
- 18 May – Patrick Buckley, soldier, lawyer, statesman, and judge in New Zealand (born 1841).
- 8 August – William Pery, 3rd Earl of Limerick, peer (born 1840).
- 10 August – Jeremiah O'Sullivan, Roman Catholic Bishop of Mobile (born 1842).
- 15 August – Patrick Duggan, Roman Catholic Bishop of Clonfert (born 1813).
- 22 September – Edward Selby Smyth, British General, commanded Militia of Canada from 1874 to 1880 (born 1819).
- 1 November – Jack (Nonpareil) Dempsey, boxer (born 1862).
- 31 December – Leland Hone, cricketer (born 1853).
  Full date unknown
  - Canon James Goodman, Irish music collector (born 1828).

== See also ==
- 1896 in Scotland
- 1896 in Wales
