= 1834 in Ireland =

- Centuries: 17th; 18th; 19th; 20th; 21st
- Decades: 1810s; 1820s; 1830s; 1840s; 1850s
- See also: 1834 in the United Kingdom; Other events of 1834; List of years in Ireland

Events from the year 1834 in Ireland.

== Events ==
- 17 December – the Dublin and Kingstown Railway, the first public railway in Ireland, opens between Westland Row, Dublin, and Kingstown.
- 18 December – Tithe War: "Rathcormac massacre": At Gortroe, near Rathcormac, County Cork, armed Constabulary reinforced by the regular British Army kill at least nine and wound thirty protesters.
- National Education Act provides for a national system of primary education, including Catholic children, taught in the English language.
- St. Vincent's Hospital is set up at St Stephen's Green, Dublin, by Mary Aikenhead, staffed by the Religious Sisters of Charity.
- Downshire Bridge ("The Cut") underpass is built in Banbridge, County Down, by contractor William Dargan.

== Sport ==
=== Croquet ===
- Croquet is recorded as being played in Ireland (at Greenmount near Castlebellingham, County Louth) at about this date.

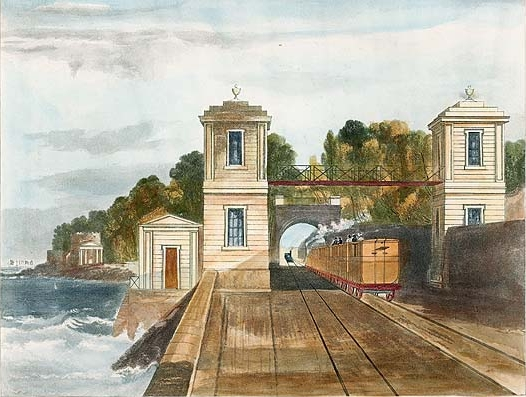
Dublin and Kingstown Railway

== Births ==
- January 14 – William Cleaver Francis Robinson, Governor and Musical Composer (died 1897)
- March – Timothy Eaton, businessman in Canada, founder of Eaton's department store (died 1907).
- 15 July – John Horgan, politician and member of the Western Australian Legislative Council (died 1907).
- 1 August – William Murphy, evangelical Protestant preacher (died 1872).
- 4 September – Robert Montresor Rogers, recipient of the Victoria Cross for gallantry in 1860 at the Taku Forts, China (died 1895).
- 24 December – Charles W. Jones, lawyer and United States Senator in Florida (died 1897).
- Percy Hetherington Fitzgerald, literary biographer, drama critic and sculptor (died 1925).

== Deaths ==
- 6 January – Richard Martin, "Humanity Dick", politician and animal rights activist (born 1754).
- 4 June – Samuel Greg, entrepreneur and pioneer of the factory system at Quarry Bank Mill (born 1758).

== See also ==
- 1834 in Scotland
- 1834 in Wales
