= 1897 in Ireland =

- Centuries: 17th; 18th; 19th; 20th; 21st
- Decades: 1870s; 1880s; 1890s; 1900s; 1910s
- See also: 1897 in the United Kingdom; Other events of 1897; List of years in Ireland

Events from the year 1897 in Ireland.

== Events ==
- October – Scottish evangelist William Irvine begins preaching independently, origin of the "Two by Twos" ("The Truth") Christian movement.
- St Kevin's Pauper Lunatic Asylum opens in Cork.
- The Irish Motor Car and Cycle Company is established.

== Arts and literature ==
- 26 May – Bram Stoker's novel Dracula is first published, in London.
- 13 December – The third Theatre Royal opens in Dublin.
- The first Feis Ceoil musical and cultural festival is organised in Dublin by Dr. Annie Patterson, Edward Martyn and Dr. George Sigerson.
- George Sigerson's translated anthology Bards of the Gael and Gall and his daughter Dora Sigerson Shorter's The Fairy Changeling, and Other Poems are published.
- Amanda McKittrick Ros publishes Irene Iddesleigh.

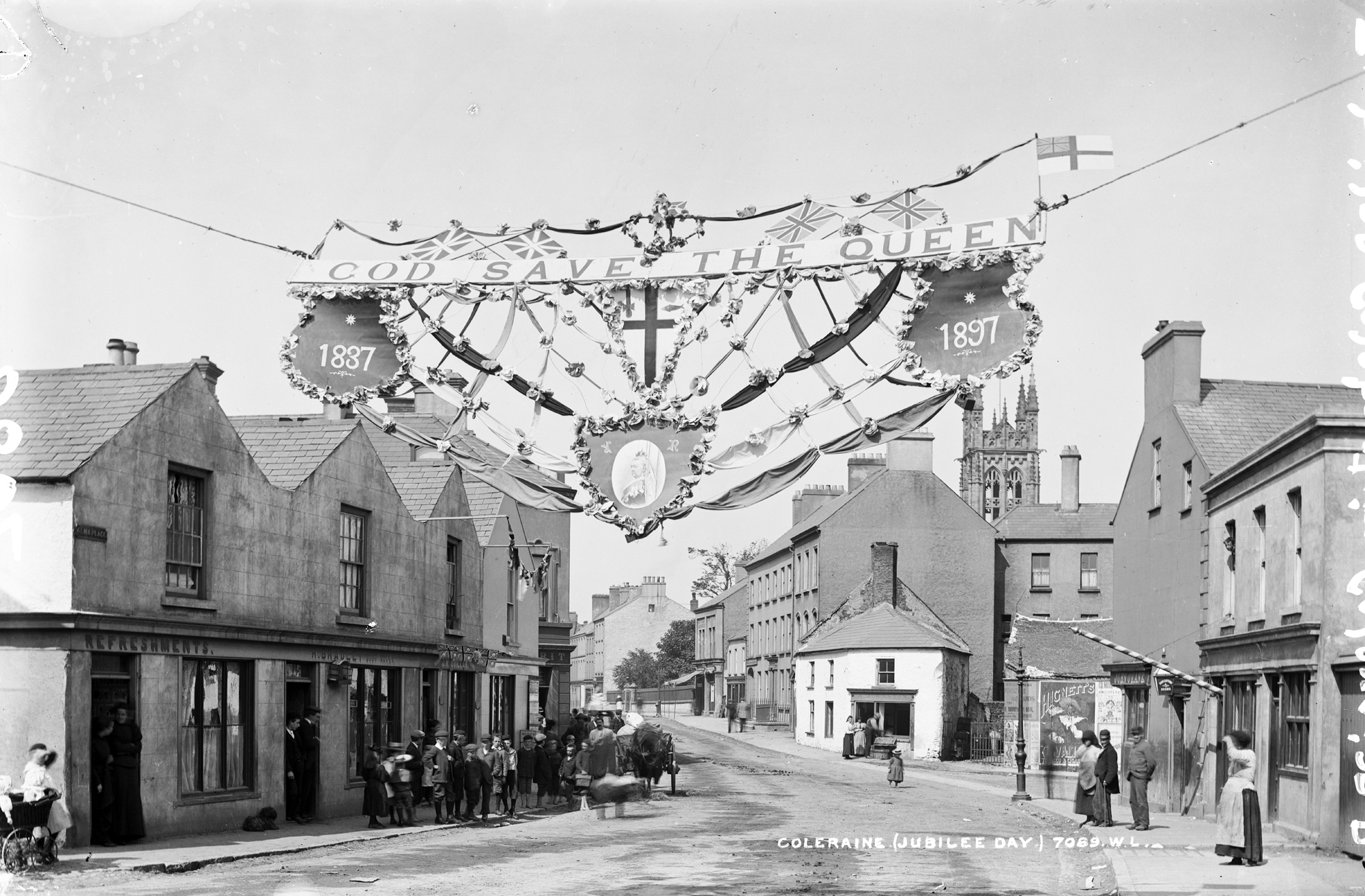
Display in celebration of Queen Victoria's Diamond Jubilee on Alma Place in Coleraine

== Sport ==
=== Football ===
- International
  20 February England 6–0 Ireland (in Nottingham)
  6 March Ireland 4–3 Wales (in Belfast)
  27 March Scotland 5–1 Ireland (in Glasgow)
- Irish League
  Winners: Glentoran
- Irish Cup
  Winners: Cliftonville 3–1 Sherwood Foresters

== Births ==
- 1 February – Eddie Doyle, Kilkenny hurler (died 1948).
- 15 January – Mark Killilea Snr, Fianna Fáil TD, member of the Seanad (died 1970).
- 1 March – Robert Bruce Bowers, cricketer (died 1956).
- 23 March – John Lighton Synge, mathematician and physicist (died 1995).
- 4 April – Francis Evans, British diplomat (died 1983).
- 29 April – Mainie Jellett, abstract painter (died 1944).
- 26 May – Ernie O'Malley, prominent officer in the Irish Republican Army during the Irish War of Independence and on anti-Treaty side in the Irish Civil War and a writer (died 1957).
- 10 June – Moss (Maurice) Twomey, chief of staff of the Irish Republican Army (died 1978).
- 1 July – Tom Barry, guerrilla leader in the Irish Republican Army during the Irish War of Independence (died 1980).
- 18 August – Enid Starkie, literary critic and biographer (died 1970).
- 1 September – Andy Kennedy, footballer (died 1963).
- 17 September – Bob Fullam, soccer player (died 1974).
- 26 November – Thomas Derrig, Fianna Fáil TD and Cabinet Minister (died 1956).
- 3 December – Kate O'Brien, novelist (died 1974).
- Full date unknown – Ed Reavy, fiddle player and songwriter (died 1988).

== Deaths ==
- 21 January – Anthony O'Grady Lefroy, government official in Western Australia (born 1816).
- 24 January – Margaret Wolfe Hungerford, novelist (born 1855).
- 3 March – Garrett Byrne, Irish nationalist and MP (born 1829).
- 19 March – Antoine Thomson d'Abbadie, geographer (born 1810).
- 1 April – William Plunket, 4th Baron Plunket, Church of Ireland Archbishop of Dublin (born 1828).
- 9 August – William R. Roberts, diplomat, Fenian Society member and United States Representative from New York (born 1830).
- 11 October – Charles W. Jones, lawyer and United States Senator in Florida (born 1834).
- 31 October – Samuel Haughton, scientific writer (born 1821).
- 25 November – John Coleman, United States Marine, recipient of Medal of Honor for his actions in 1871 during the Korean Expedition (born 1847).
- 8 December – Mary O'Connell, nurse during the American Civil War (born 1814).

== See also ==
- 1897 in Scotland
- 1897 in Wales
