= 1750 in Ireland =

- Centuries: 16th; 17th; 18th; 19th; 20th
- Decades: 1730s; 1740s; 1750s; 1760s; 1770s
- See also: Other events of 1750; List of years in Ireland

Events from the year 1750 in Ireland.

== Incumbent ==
- Monarch: George II

== Events ==
- At about this date, a chocolate house, the predecessor of Daly's Club, is established in Dublin.
- Captain Henry Delamain takes over the World's End Pottery in Dublin, bringing his expertise in the manufacture of Delftware.

== Births ==
- 7 February – Thomas McCord, businessman and politician in Lower Canada (died 1824)
- 24 July – John Philpot Curran, orator and wit, lawyer and MP (died 1817)
- Full date unknown

- John Connolly, second bishop of the Roman Catholic diocese of New York (died 1825)

== Deaths ==
- 29 July – Laetitia Pilkington, poet and memoirist (born c. 1709)
- Seamus McMurphy, poet and outlaw (born 1720)
