= 1892 in Ireland =

- Centuries: 17th; 18th; 19th; 20th; 21st
- Decades: 1870s; 1880s; 1890s; 1900s; 1910s
- See also: 1892 in the United Kingdom; Other events of 1892; List of years in Ireland

Events from the year 1892 in Ireland.

== Events ==
- June
  - Ulster Unionists hold a huge convention in Belfast at which they solemnly swear that "We will not have Home Rule".
  - The Knights of the Plough, a farm labourers' body, predecessor of the Irish Land and Labour Association, is founded by Benjamin Pellin in Narraghmore, County Kildare.
- 1 July – Edward Carson sworn in as Solicitor-General for Ireland.
- 9 July – in the General Election, Edward Carson, standing as a Liberal Unionist, is elected to one of two Trinity College Dublin seats.
- 21 August – the Roman Catholic St. Macartan's Cathedral, Monaghan, is dedicated.
- 25 November – Douglas Hyde lectures to the National Literary Society on The Necessity for de-anglicising the Irish People, a precursor to the founding of the Gaelic League.
- The Belfast Labour Party, the first Socialist Party in Ireland, is established in Belfast.
- Free primary schooling and compulsory education up to the age of 14 is introduced through the Irish Education Act.
- The Roman Catholic Ballina Cathedral is completed after more than sixty years.

== Arts and literature ==
- The Irish Literary Society is founded by W. B. Yeats, T. W. Rolleston and Charles Gavan Duffy in London, and the National Literary Society by Yeats in Dublin with Douglas Hyde as its first president.
- 22 February – Oscar Wilde stages Lady Windermere's Fan in London.
- April – First publication of The Irish Naturalist

== Sport ==
=== Football ===
- International
  27 February Wales 1–1 Ireland (in Bangor)
  5 March Ireland 0–2 England (in Belfast)
  19 March Ireland 2–3 Scotland (in Belfast)
- Irish League
  Winners: Linfield
- Irish Cup
  Winners: Linfield 7–0 The Black Watch
- Derry Olympic becomes only the second non-Belfast team in the Irish Football League, but only lasted one season.
- The Leinster Football Association is founded as the game's popularity is no longer confined to Ulster.
- The Oval football ground in Belfast is opened as the home of Glentoran.

=== Golf ===
- The first Irish Golf Championship is held.
- Lahinch Golf Club is founded.

== Births ==
- 1 January – P. J. Ruttledge, Sinn Féin, then Fianna Fáil, TD and Cabinet Minister (died 1952).
- 10 January – Leo Whelan, painter (died 1956).
- 2 February – Alan McKibbin, businessman and Ulster Unionist Party MP (died 1958).
- 5 March – Tom Hales, Irish Republican Army volunteer in Anglo-Irish War and Irish Civil War (died 1966).
- 4 April – Tom Jameson, cricketer (died 1965).
- 4 May – Willie Hough, Limerick hurler (died 1976).
- 6 May – Edward FitzGerald, 7th Duke of Leinster, peer and gambler (died 1976).
- 7 June – Kevin O'Higgins, Minister for Justice (assassinated by Irish Republican Army 1927).
- 15 August – Derrick Hall, cricketer (died 1947).
- 17 September – Seán Óg Murphy, Cork hurler, Gaelic Athletic Association administrator (died 1956).
- 20 September – Patricia Collinge, actress and writer (died 1974).
- 15 October – James Kempster, cricketer (died 1975).
- 14 November – Nora Connolly O'Brien, political activist, daughter of James Connolly (born in Edinburgh; died 1981).
- 26 November – Mike McTigue, boxer, light heavyweight champion of the world 1923–1925 (died 1966).
- 24 December – Claude Nunney, Canadian Expeditionary Force soldier, recipient of the Victoria Cross for gallantry in 1918 on the Drocourt-Queant Line, France (born in Hastings; died of wounds 1918).
  Full date unknown
  - Eamon Bulfin, Irish republican (born in Argentina; died 1968).
  - Eamon Martin, a founder of Fianna Éireann and an Irish Volunteer fighting in the Easter Rising (died 1971).

== Deaths ==
- 26 January – Bernard Diamond, soldier, recipient of the Victoria Cross for gallantry in 1857 at Bolandshahr, India (born 1827).
- 3 February – "Roaring" Hugh Hanna, Evangelical preacher (born 1821).
- 5 February – John Hogan, businessman and United States Representative from Missouri (born 1805).
- 29 February – John Lucas, soldier, recipient of the Victoria Cross for gallantry in 1861 in New Zealand (born 1826).
- 8 May – James Thomson, engineer and physicist (born 1822).
- 17 May – William Walsh, U.S. Congressman in Maryland (born 1828).
- 29 May – Richard Charles Mayne, British admiral, explorer and MP (born 1835).
- 31 May – John Kean, businessman and politician in Ontario (born 1820).
- 2 June – Robert Templeton, naturalist, artist and entomologist (born 1802).
- August – John Doyle, soldier at the Charge of the Light Brigade (b. c1828).
- 29 October – William Harnett, painter (born 1848).
- 30 November – Fenton John Anthony Hort, theologian and writer (born 1828).

== See also ==
- 1892 in Scotland
- 1892 in Wales
