= 1910 in Ireland =

- Centuries: 18th; 19th; 20th; 21st
- Decades: 1890s; 1900s; 1910s; 1920s; 1930s
- See also: 1910 in the United Kingdom; Other events of 1910; List of years in Ireland

Events in the year 1910 in Ireland.

== Events ==
- 8 January – Sinéad Flanagan married future Irish president Éamon de Valera in Dublin.
- 21 February – Irish Unionist members of the Westminster Parliament elected Sir Edward Carson as party leader, replacing Walter Long.
- 23 February – St Patrick's College, Maynooth, became a recognised college of the National University of Ireland.
- May – The Irish Countrywomen's Association was founded, as the Society of the United Irishwomen, by a group of educated and largely Protestant women in Bree, County Wexford.
- June – Bridget Dowling eloped to London with Alois Hitler Jr., a kitchen porter at the Shelbourne Hotel, Dublin, and half-brother to Adolf.
- July – Irish republican and socialist leader James Connolly returned to Ireland from the United States.
- August – The first passenger flight in Ulster: Harry Ferguson piloted Miss Rita Marr.
- 29 August – The Aero Club of Ireland held its inaugural aviation meeting at Leopardstown Racecourse.
- 11 September – English-born actor-aviator Robert Loraine made an aeroplane flight from Wales across the Irish Sea but landed some 200 feet (60 metres) short of the Irish coast in Dublin Bay.
- 20 October – RMS Olympic was launched at the Harland & Wolff shipyard in Belfast. At 45,324 gross tons, she was the largest ship afloat. Her sister ship RMS Titanic was launched 16 months later.
- November
  - Reconstruction began of the original city bridge over the River Suir in Waterford; it was opened in 1913 by John Redmond.
  - The Irish Republican Brotherhood monthly newspaper Irish Freedom began publication in Dublin.
- 3 December – Sir Edward Carson and James Campbell were re-elected unopposed as Unionist Members of Parliament for Trinity College Dublin.
- The Non-subscribing Presbyterian Church of Ireland was created by merger of the Presbytery of Antrim and Remonstrant Synod of Ulster.
- Lilian Bland built and flew her own biplane glider, the first built in Ireland, from Carnmoney Hill; an engine was fitted soon afterwards and she made her first powered flight in late August.

== Arts and literature ==
- 13 January – The play Deirdre of the Sorrows by John Millington Synge (died 1909) was performed for the first time at the Abbey Theatre, Dublin.
- 5 May – Padraic Colum's play Thomas Muskerry premiered at the Abbey Theatre.
- 7 May – Annie Horniman withdrew financial support from the Abbey Theatre in protest at its refusal to close on the death of King Edward VII the previous day.
- August – The Kalem Company of New York began shooting the first of several films partly on location in Ireland, A Lad from Old Ireland, with a filming location around Beaufort, County Kerry, with Canadian Irish director Sidney Olcott. This was the first production by an American film studio to be shot outside the United States.
- September – Lord Dunsany's short story collection A Dreamer's Tales was published.
- 3 November – The oldest céilí band in Ireland, The Kilfenora Céilí Band was founded in Kilfenora, County Clare.
- The Cork Public Museum opened.
- Terence MacSwiney's first play, The Last Warriors of Coole, was produced.
- Ella Young's first book of stories, Celtic Wonder Tales, was published with illustrations by Maud Gonne.

== Sport ==
=== Association football ===
- International
  - 12 February Ireland 1–1 England (in Belfast)
  - 19 March Ireland 1–0 Scotland (in Belfast)
  - 11 April Wales 4–1 Ireland (in Wrexham)
  Irish League
  - Winners: Cliftonville F.C.
  Irish Cup
- Winners: Distillery F.C. 1–0 Cliftonville F.C.

== Births ==
- 1 January – Charles Billingsley, cricketer (died 1951).
- 2 January – Gearóid Ó Cuinneagáin, politician (died 1991).
- 6 January – James "Lugs" Branigan, police detective and boxer (died 1986).
- 16 January – William Bedell Stanford, classical scholar and senator (died 1984).
- 29 January – Colin Middleton, artist (died 1983).
- 10 April – Fintan Coogan Snr, Fine Gael party TD (died 1984).
- 13 April – Aloys Fleischmann, composer and musicologist (died 1992).
- 9 May – Barbara Woodhouse, dog trainer (died 1988).
- 20 May – Johnny Callanan, Fianna Fáil party TD (died 1982).
- 5 June – Ham Lambert, cricketer and rugby player (died 2006).
- 12 June – Bill Naughton, playwright and author (died 1992).
- 24 June – Margaret Kelly, dancer (died 2004).
- 27 June – Nicholas Mansergh, historian (died 1991).
- 1 July – Dan Spring, Gaelic footballer, trade unionist and Labour Party TD (died 1988).
- 4 July – George Otto Simms, Church of Ireland Archbishop of Dublin and Archbishop of Armagh (died 1991).
- 1 August – Cathal Gannon, harpsichord maker and fortepiano restorer (died 1999).
- 8 August – Bobby Kirk, ice hockey player (died 1970).
- 14 August – Eddie Ingram, cricketer (died 1973).
- 24 September – Robert Alexander, rugby and cricket player (died 1943).
- 1 November – Michael Lyons, Fine Gael party TD and Senator (died 1991).
- 15 November – Geoffrey Toone, actor (died 2005).
- 19 November – Manliff Barrington, motorcycle racer (died 1999).
- 26 November – Cyril Cusack, actor (died 1993).
- 29 November – Máirtín Ó Direáin, poet (died 1988).
- 10 December – Vivion de Valera, barrister, managing director of The Irish Press, Fianna Fáil party TD representing Dublin North-West (died 1982).
- 22 December – James Boucher, cricketer (died 1995).
- 26 December – Stephen Coughlan, Labour Party TD and Mayor of Limerick (died 1994).
  Full date unknown
  - Peter Kavanagh, association football player (died 1993).
  - Betty Miller, writer (died 1965).
  - Séamus Ó Néill, writer (died 1981).

== Deaths ==
- 17 February – St. Clair Augustine Mulholland, American Civil War officer (born 1839).
- 6 May – King Edward VII (born 1841).
- 30 August – Hedges Eyre Chatterton, Conservative Party Member of Parliament and Vice-Chancellor of Ireland (born 1819).
- 30 August – George Throssell, second Premier of Western Australia (born 1840).

== See also ==
- 1910 in Scotland
- 1910 in Wales
