= 1749 in Ireland =

- Centuries: 16th; 17th; 18th; 19th; 20th
- Decades: 1720s; 1730s; 1740s; 1750s; 1760s
- See also: Other events of 1749; List of years in Ireland

Events from the year 1749 in Ireland.

== Incumbent ==
- Monarch: George II

== Events ==
- 3 June – radical apothecary Charles Lucas begins publication of The Censor, or Citizens' Journal in Dublin.
- August–September – Charles Wesley makes his second visit to Ireland.
- 16 October – the Irish House of Commons threatens Charles Lucas with prosecution and he is forced to flee.
- James Simon's An essay towards an historical account of Irish coins is published in Dublin.

== Births ==
- 22 January – John Barclay, soldier, politician, jurist and businessman in America (died 1824)
- July – Jocelyn Deane, politician (died 1780)
- Robert Barber, quartermaster on HMS Adventure during the second voyage of James Cook (died 1783)
- Thomas Burke, artist (died 1815)
- William Richardson, landowner and politician (died 1822)
- Edward Smyth, sculptor (died 1812)
- James Whitelaw, historian, writer, statistician and philanthropist (died 1813)
- Approximate date – Brian Merriman, Irish language poet (died 1805)

== Deaths ==
- 3 January – John Ussher, politician (born 1703)
- 22 January – Matthew Concanen, writer, poet and lawyer (born 1701)
- 20 February (hanged at Tyburn) – Usher Gahagan, classical scholar.
- May – Samuel Boyse, poet (born 1702/3)
- 21 September – Sir John Bingham, 5th Baronet, politician (born 1690)
- Approximate date – Eamonn Laidir Ó Flaithbertaigh, Jacobite.
