= 1899 in Ireland =

- Centuries: 17th; 18th; 19th; 20th; 21st
- Decades: 1870s; 1880s; 1890s; 1900s; 1910s
- See also: 1899 in the United Kingdom; Other events of 1899; List of years in Ireland

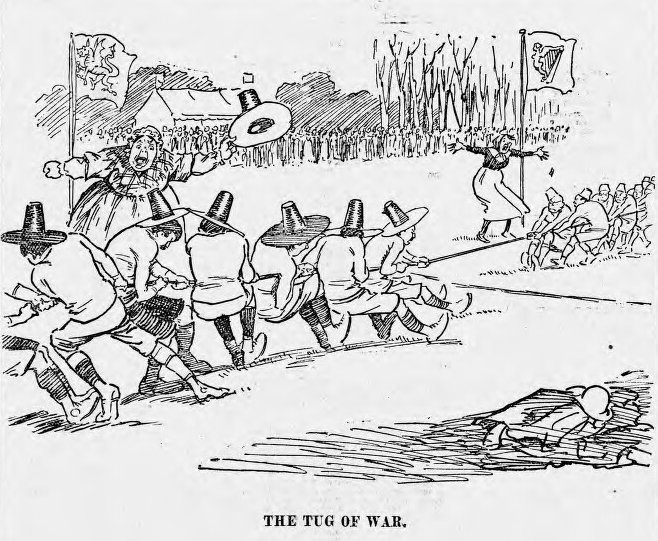
The tug of war match between Wales and Ireland at the Home Nations Championship of 1899

Events from the year 1899 in Ireland.

== Events ==
- 14 January – Ocean liner RMS Oceanic was launched by Harland and Wolff in Belfast.
- 4 March – the first issue of Arthur Griffith and William Rooney's nationalist newspaper, The United Irishman, was published.
- 6 September – the foundation stone of St Anne's Cathedral, Belfast, was laid by the Countess of Shaftesbury.
- 8 October – The foundation stone of the Parnell Monument on Sackville Street, Dublin was laid. Three days later, a delegation including the Lord Mayor of Dublin and John Redmond MP departed Ireland via steamer to the USA to raise funds for the monument
- 11 October – the Second Boer War began in South Africa. Major John MacBride raised the Irish Transvaal Brigade to aid the Boers. Nationalist Member of Parliament Michael Davitt withdrew from the House of Commons of the United Kingdom in protest at the war.

== Arts and literature ==
- 8 May – the Irish Literary Theatre, founded by W. B. Yeats, Augusta, Lady Gregory, George Moore and Edward Martyn, stages its first performance, a version of Yeats' verse drama The Countess Cathleen, at the Antient Concert Rooms in Great Brunswick Street, Dublin.
- Somerville and Ross publish their first collection of humorous stories Some Experiences of an Irish R.M.
- W. B. Yeats publishes The Wind Amongst the Reeds.
- The Rathmines and Rathgar music society is founded.

== Sport ==
=== Athletics ===
- Tom Kiely establishes a world record in the hammer event. He becomes the first man to throw the hammer more than 160 feet.

=== Football ===
- International
  18 February England 13–2 Ireland (in Sunderland)
  4 March Ireland 1–0 Wales (in Belfast)
  25 March Scotland 9–1 Ireland (in Glasgow)
- Irish League
  Winners: Distillery
- Irish Cup
  Winners: Linfield 2–1 Glentoran

=== Golf ===
- British Ladies Amateur Golf Championship held at Royal County Down Golf Club (winner: May Hezlet)

=== Yachting ===
- America's Cup
  Ulster Scots grocer Thomas Lipton (Royal Ulster Yacht Club) makes his first unsuccessful challenge of the United States with Shamrock

== Births ==
- 18 January – Sir Anthony Esmonde, 15th Baronet, Fine Gael TD and MEP (died 1981).
- 21 January – John Bodkin Adams, general practitioner in Eastbourne cleared of murdering one of his patients (died 1983).
- 13 March – Arthur Duff, composer and conductor (died 1956).
- 10 April – Liam Ó Buachalla, Cathaoirleach of Seanad Éireann 1951–1954 and 1957–1969 (died 1970).
- 26 April – Jimmy O'Dea, comedian (died 1965).
- 25 May – Lory Meagher, Kilkenny hurler (died 1973).
- 7 June – Elizabeth Bowen, novelist and short story writer (died 1973).
- 20 June – Robert Donovan, cricketer (died 1932).
- 4 July – Alexander Armstrong, naval surgeon, explorer and author (born 1818).
- 15 July – Seán Lemass, Fianna Fáil TD and founder member, Cabinet Minister and Taoiseach (died 1971).
- 9 September – Arland Ussher, English-born academic, essayist and translator (died 1980).
- 22 September – Mick Gill, Galway and Dublin hurler (died 1980).
- 25 October – Micheál MacLiammóir, born Alfred Willmore, actor and dramatist (born in London; died 1978).
- 26 November – Jacko Heaslip, cricketer (died 1966).
- 10 December – Garrett Howard, Dublin and Limerick hurler (died 1995).
- Full date unknown
  - Tommy Coleman, Irish volunteer (died 1988).
  - Patrick Giles, Fine Gael TD (died 1965).
  - Paddy McLogan, Sinn Féin President (died 1964).
  - David Neligan, policeman, "The Spy in the Castle" for Michael Collins (died 1983).
  - Eugene O'Mahony, entomologist and museum curator (died 1951).

== Deaths ==
- 16 March – Alexander Balloch Grosart, Presbyterian minister and literary editor (born 1827 in Scotland)
- 19 March – Patrick Walsh, journalist, politician and mayor of Augusta, Georgia (born 1840).
- 16 May – Frederick McCoy, palaeontologist and museum administrator in Australia (born 1817).
- 5 June – Margaret Anna Cusack, nun, writer and founder of the Sisters of St. Joseph of Peace (born 1832).
- 18 October – Eugene O'Growney, priest and scholar (born 1863).
- 8 November – Thomas Newenham Deane, architect (born 1828).
- 17 December – Walter Shanly, civil engineer, author, businessman and politician in Canada (born 1817).

== See also ==
- 1899 in Scotland
- 1899 in Wales
