= 1751 in Ireland =

- Centuries: 16th; 17th; 18th; 19th; 20th
- Decades: 1730s; 1740s; 1750s; 1760s; 1770s
- See also: Other events of 1751; List of years in Ireland

Events from the year 1751 in Ireland.

== Incumbent ==
- Monarch: George II

== Events ==
- 5 October – the title Earl of Upper Ossory is created in the Peerage of Ireland in favour of John FitzPatrick, 2nd Baron Gowran.
- The house which will become Áras an Uachtaráin is built in Phoenix Park, Dublin, by the park's Chief Ranger, politician Nathaniel Clements, to his own design.

== Arts and literature ==
- The actress Peg Woffington begins a 3-year residence in her native Dublin at Thomas Sheridan's Smock Alley Theatre.

== Births ==
- September – William Hare, 1st Earl of Listowel, peer and MP (died 1837).
- 19 October – Charles Edward Jennings de Kilmaine, soldier in France (died 1799).
- 30 October – Richard Brinsley Sheridan, playwright and statesman (died 1816).
- Undated – Edward Marcus Despard, British colonel turned revolutionary (executed for high treason 1803).

== Deaths ==
- 19 April – Peter Lacy, soldier, imperial commander in Russia (born 1678).
