= 1752 in Ireland =

- Centuries: 16th; 17th; 18th; 19th; 20th
- Decades: 1730s; 1740s; 1750s; 1760s; 1770s
- See also: Other events of 1752; List of years in Ireland

Events from the year 1752 in Ireland.

== Incumbent ==
- Monarch: George II

== Events ==
- 1 May – commissioners for the promotion of inland navigation in Ireland are incorporated.
- c. July – Methodist church opens in Whitefriar Street, Dublin.
- 28 August – Belfast Charitable Society, established to open the poorhouse which will become Clifton House, Belfast, first meets.
- 3–13 September inclusive – these dates are omitted from the calendar in Great Britain and Ireland as part of the adoption of the Gregorian calendar, correcting the discrepancy between Old Style and New Style dates, under terms of the Calendar (New Style) Act 1750.
- The Church of Ireland Bishoprics of Killaloe and Kilfenora are united under the Bishop of Killaloe and Kilfenora.
- Rev. Richard Pococke makes an extended tour of Ireland.

== Births ==
- 30 July – Valentine Quin, 1st Earl of Dunraven and Mount-Earl, peer (died 1824)
- Leonard McNally, informant against members of the Society of United Irishmen (died 1820)

== Deaths ==
- 8 January – John Blunden, politician (born c.1695)
- 17 July – Arthur Price, Church of Ireland Archbishop of Cashel (born 1678/9)
- 29 July – Sir Peter Warren, Royal Navy officer (born 1703)
- 3 October – Frederick Trench, politician (born 1681)
