= 1903 in Ireland =

- Centuries: 18th; 19th; 20th; 21st
- Decades: 1880s; 1890s; 1900s; 1910s; 1920s
- See also: 1903 in the United Kingdom; Other events of 1903; List of years in Ireland

Events in the year 1903 in Ireland.

== Events ==
- 3 January – The Norwegian ship Remittant was towed into quarantine in Queenstown with the entire crew suffering from beriberi.
- 3 February – The proposed canonisation of Oliver Plunkett was discussed in Rome.
- 26–27 February – "Ulysses" Storm: A windstorm passed across Ireland, uprooting 1–3,000 trees in Phoenix Park.
- 26 February – The ocean liner SS Columbus was launched by Harland and Wolff in Belfast.
- 27 February – A meeting at the Mansion House, Dublin, enthusiastically welcomed a movement to establish Saint Patrick's Day as a national holiday.
- 8 March – Charles Gavan Duffy was buried at Glasnevin Cemetery in Dublin. He was laid to rest near others who took part in the Young Irelander Rebellion of 1848.
- 9 March – The Londonderry and Lough Swilly Railway's Letterkenny and Burtonport Extension was opened.
- 17 March – In Waterford, Saint Patrick's Day was marked as a public holiday (to encourage temperance).
- 26 March – The Chief Secretary for Ireland, George Wyndham, introduced his Irish Land Bill in the House of Commons of the United Kingdom.
- 31 March – The Lord-Lieutenant announced that Edward VII and Queen Alexandra intended to visit Ireland within the coming year.
- 15 May – The Chief Secretary for Ireland, George Wyndham, asked for support for his Irish Land Bill.
- 23 May – Extracts from the annual report of the British Army showed that there were 35,717 Irishmen in its service.
- 9 June – Trinity College Dublin announced following a vote that it was to award degrees to women. The first women would be admitted in 1904.
- 1 July – The Belfast and Northern Counties Railway became the Northern Counties Committee of the Midland Railway of England.
- 19–27 July – Edward VII made his first visit to Ireland as monarch, landing at Buncrana.
- 14 August – The Land Purchase (Ireland) Act 1903 was passed in the House of Commons of the United Kingdom, offering special incentives to landlords to sell their entire estates.
- 5 September – Irish painter Henry Jones Thaddeus was granted permission to paint the first portrait of Pope Pius X.
- 13 November – The 2nd Battalion of The Royal Dublin Fusiliers was welcomed home after nearly 20 years of foreign service.
  Undated
  - Independent Orange Institution was formed, as a breakaway from the Orange Institution.
  - The Pigeon House generating station in Dublin started producing electricity.
  - The withdrawal of the last British Royal Navy guard ship to be permanently stationed at Kingstown, the cruiser HMS Melampus (1890), took place.
  - The Cork International Exhibition was re-opened.

== Arts and literature ==
- January – An Túr Gloine, the cooperative studio for stained glass, was established by Sarah Purser in Dublin.
- 8 October – J. M. Synge's play, In the Shadow of the Glen, was first performed at the Molesworth Hall, Dublin.
- 7 December – The first Irish language opera, Muirgheis, with music by Thomas O'Brien Butler and libretto by Thadgh O'Donoghue was first performed at the Theatre Royal, Dublin.
- Padraic Colum's Broken Soil was performed by W. G. Fay's Irish National Dramatic Company.
- George Moore's short stories The Untilled Field were published.
- 'Æ' (George William Russell)'s The Nuts of Knowledge, lyrical poems old and new was published by Elizabeth Yeats's Dun Emer Press at Dundrum, Dublin.
- W. B. Yeats's poetry collection In the Seven Woods, being poems of the Irish heroic age was published by his sister's Dun Emer Press; he also published his essays Ideas of Good and Evil.
- County Cork-born Chicago chief of police Francis O'Neill's collection O'Neill's Music of Ireland was published.

== Sport ==
=== Association football ===
- International
  14 February – England 4–0 Ireland (in Wolverhampton)
  21 March – Scotland 0–2 Ireland (in Glasgow)
  28 March – Ireland 2–0 Wales (in Belfast)
  Irish League
  Winners: Distillery F.C.
  Irish Cup
  Winners: Distillery F.C. 3–1 Bohemian F.C.
- Bohemian F.C. became the first Dublin team to join the Irish Football League.
- The Oval football stadium, home of Glentoran F.C., was rebuilt, with the pitch being turned around ninety degrees.

=== Motor racing ===
- 2 July – The Gordon Bennett Cup race was run on Irish public roads, the first international motor race in Ireland. The winner was Camille Jenatzy.

== Births ==
- 15 January – Joe Stynes, Irish Republican and sportsman (died 1991).
- 19 January – Alfred Lane Beit, British politician, art collector and philanthropist, honorary Irish citizen (died 1994).
- 28 January – Kathleen Lonsdale, X-ray crystallographer (died 1971).
- 2 February – Hilton Edwards, actor, director, co–founder of Gate Theatre, born in London (died 1982).
- 5 February – William Teeling, author, traveller and UK politician (died 1975).
- 23 February – Alec Mackie, association football player (died 1984 in Northern Ireland).
- 11 March – Michael Hilliard, Fianna Fáil party TD, Cabinet minister and Member of the European Parliament (died 1982).
- 13 March – Joseph Blowick second leader of the Clann na Talmhan party, TD and Cabinet minister (died 1970).
- 5 April – Leo Rowsome, teacher, player, and maker of uilleann pipes (died 1970).
- 12 April – Paddy Collins, Cork hurler (died 1995).
- 23 May – Shelah Richards, actress, director, and producer (died 1985)
- 25 May – Ewart Milne, poet (died 1987).
- 8 June – Harry Duggan, association football player (died 1968).
- 17 July – Dinny Barry-Murphy, Cork hurler (died 1973).
- 18 July – Charles Hill, cricketer (died 1982).
- 5 August – Achey Kelly, cricketer (died 1961).
- 17 September – Frank O'Connor, short story writer and memoirist (died 1966).
- 6 October – Ernest Walton, physicist, 1951 Nobel Prize for Physics (died 1995).
- 23 October – Patrick Cogan, Independent TD (died 1977).
- 1 November – Max Adrian, actor (died 1973).
- 18 December – Harry Forsyth, cricketer (died 2004).
  Undated
  - Leo Maguire, singer, songwriter and radio broadcaster (died 1985).
  - Stanley Woods, motor cycle racer, with 29 Grand Prix wins and 10 Isle of Man TT wins (died 1993).

== Deaths ==
- 9 February – Charles Gavan Duffy, nationalist and Australian colonial politician (born 1816).
- 5 April – Mary Anne Sadlier, novelist (born 1820).
- 24 April – Walter Osborne, impressionist painter (born 1859).
- 27 April – William Travers, lawyer, politician, explorer, and naturalist in New Zealand (born 1819).
- 25 July – John Michael Clancy, Democratic Party United States Representative from New York (born 1837).
- 31 August – Charles O'Hea, Catholic Priest, baptised Ned Kelly and ministered to him before he was hanged in 1880 (born c. 1814).
- 12 September – Maxwell Henry Close, geologist (born 1822).
- 22 October – William Edward Hartpole Lecky, historian (born 1838).
- 24 October – James Adams (chaplain), recipient of the Victoria Cross for gallantry in Afghanistan (1879) (born 1839).

== See also ==
- 1903 in Scotland
- 1903 in Wales
