= Henry Hamilton O'Hara "Mad O'hara" =

Henry Hamilton O'Hara, also known as "Mad O'Hara" or "The Mad Squire of Craigbilly" or "Crebilly" (1820–1875) was the last squire of Craigbilly Castle in County Antrim, Ireland. The O'Hara family was, for over 600 years, the landed gentry of Ballymena and surrounding areas.

Henry Hamilton O'Hara is the subject of many local legend. He was a gambler and bigamist with a ferocious temper. Most famously, one day on returning from gaming he entered the house with several friends, and his wife would not stand to greet them. He is said to have shoveled hot coals onto her lap with the words, "Now will you rise?" It was for such actions that he was labelled "Mad O'Hara". These stories stand in contrast to some of the primary evidence of the time. For example, he was considered a good landlord as evidenced by the inscriptions on his tombstone:

He Was A Most Kind and Liberal
Landlord And This Monument
Is Erected By The Tenants On His
Estates In Grateful Remembrance

and

Blessed Are The Merciful
For They Shall Obtain
Mercy
MATH VC = C7

It is believed that O'Hara's unique grave marker is the source of the "Headless Horseman" ghost story. It is still visible in the local graveyard, and consists of a pillar, jaggedly shorn at the top: this "headless" tomb was expanded into the headless horseman tale. While it is commonly believed that the unusual marker was actually created to represent a shattered and broken life: O'Hara gambled away the family fortune, and died a broken man, this type of column is a common feature. It is either used to symbolise someone whose life ended prematurely, or is a masonic symbol.

== Family Crests & Blazons ==
H H Hamilton O'Hara of Craigbilly Castle, Ballymeena, Co. Antrim, Ireland.

1. Out Of A Ducal Coronet Or, An Oak-Tree Ppr., Fructed Of The First And Penetrated Transversely By A Frame-Saw Of The Second, The Frame Or.
2. A Demi-Lion Rampant Pean, Armed And Langued Gu., Holding In The Paws A Chaplet Of Oak-Leaves Ppr.

Family Motto "Try"

== Households ==
Crebilly Castle was burnt down by the IRA in the 1920s.

Nearby Marlagh Lodge was, according to valuation records, occupied by O'Hara in 1859 and was likely built by him. It has now been restored to a spa and restaurant.

There is a section devoted to the story of "Mad O'Hara" and the legend of the headless horseman in a local museum.
