= 1831 in Ireland =

- Centuries: 17th; 18th; 19th; 20th; 21st
- Decades: 1810s; 1820s; 1830s; 1840s; 1850s
- See also: 1831 in the United Kingdom; Other events of 1831; List of years in Ireland

Events from the year 1831 in Ireland.

== Events ==
- January – agrarian unrest breaks out in counties Clare and Limerick.
- February – at a public meeting in Maryborough, Queen's County, farmer Patrick "Patt" Lalor declares that he will no longer pay tithes.
- 3 March – the first clash of the Tithe War takes place at Graiguenamanagh, County Kilkenny, when a force of 120 yeomanry tries to enforce seizure orders on cattle belonging to a Roman Catholic priest.
- 15 March – the replacement Irish Crown Jewels arrive in Dublin.
- 23 May – following an affray at Castlepollard Fair in County Westmeath, ten men and three women are shot dead by the Royal Irish Constabulary. Nineteen police officers stand trial for the incident but all are acquitted.
- 30 May – the first statistics for religion in Ireland are gathered in this year's Census. Around 80% of the population is Roman Catholic, 11% belong to the Church of Ireland and 8% (almost all in Ulster) are Presbyterian.
- 1 September – Zoological Gardens, Dublin, open.
- Autumn – first Catholic mass said in the new Ballina Cathedral.
- 15 October – Board of Works formed as a department of state by merger of the Office of the Surveyor-General for Ireland, the Barracks Board, and the Navigation Board.
- 23 October – George Joseph Plunket Browne is consecrated as first Bishop of the new Roman Catholic Diocese of Galway, created by the Holy See following abolition of the Wardenship of Galway (Edmund Ffrench being the last Warden).
- 7 November – Ralahine commune established at Newmarket-on-Fergus, County Clare.
- 14 December – the Carrickshock incident: Forty policemen confront a mob of over 2,000 in Carrickshock, County Kilkenny, protesting against the collection of tithes. Sixteen policemen are killed and seven wounded in the clash.
- Sisters of Mercy established in Dublin by Catherine McAuley.
- First of a series of annual meetings on prophecy at Powerscourt House which give rise to the Plymouth Brethren.
- Stanley letter is written

== Arts and literature ==
- African American actor Ira Aldridge tours Ireland.
- James Hardiman's Irish Minstrelsy, or Bardic remains of Ireland with English poetical translations published.

== Births ==
- 22 January – Samuel Hill Lawrence, recipient of the Victoria Cross for gallantry in 1857 at Lucknow, India (died 1868).
- 26 January – Hugh Annesley, 5th Earl Annesley, British military officer and MP (died 1908).
- 11 February – Henry Mitchell Jones, recipient of the Victoria Cross for gallantry in 1855 at Sebastopol, Crimea (died 1916).
- 1 August – George Richardson, soldier, recipient of the Victoria Cross for gallantry in 1859 at Kewane Trans-Gogra, India (died 1923).
- September
  - Peter Gill, recipient of the Victoria Cross for gallantry in 1857 in Benares, India (died 1868).
  - Jeremiah O'Donovan Rossa, Fenian leader (died 1915).
- 18 October — Robert Potter, minster, writer (died 1908 in Australia)
- 18 November – Albert Grant, born Abraham Gottheimer, dubious company promoter (died 1899)
- 28 November – John William Mackay, businessman in America (died 1902).
- 3 December – James Graham Fair, part-owner of the Comstock Lode, United States Senator and real estate and railroad speculator (died 1894).
- 17 December – William George Nicholas Manley, recipient of the Victoria Cross for gallantry in 1864 near Tauranga, New Zealand (died 1901).
- December – Richard Fitzgerald, recipient of the Victoria Cross for gallantry in 1857 at Bolandshahr, India (died 1884).
  Full date unknown
  - Daniel Connor, convict transported to Western Australia, businessman (died 1898).
  - John Dunlay, recipient of the Victoria Cross for gallantry in 1857 at Lucknow, India (died 1863).
  - Frederick Falkiner, lawyer, judge and author (died 1908).

== Deaths ==
- 30 January – William Hales, clergyman and scientific writer (born 1747).
- 8 December – James Hoban, architect, designed the White House in Washington, D.C. (b. c1762).
  Full date unknown
  - Alexander Macomb, Sr., merchant and land speculator with Macomb's Purchase in New York (born 1748).

== See also ==
- 1831 in Scotland
- 1831 in Wales
