= 1758 in Ireland =

- Centuries: 16th; 17th; 18th; 19th; 20th
- Decades: 1730s; 1740s; 1750s; 1760s; 1770s
- See also: Other events of 1758; List of years in Ireland

Events from the year 1758 in Ireland.

== Incumbent ==
- Monarch: George II

== Events ==
- 29 April – the Wide Streets Commission (officially the Commissioners for making Wide and Convenient Ways, Streets and Passages) is established by the Parliament Street Act 1757 (31 Geo. 2. c. 19 (I)) at the request of Dublin Corporation to govern standards on the layout of streets, bridges, buildings and other architectural considerations, influential in the creation of Georgian Dublin.
- Summer – work begins on construction of what will become the Grand Canal near Dublin.
- 27 October – the ship Dublin Trader (Captain White) leaves Parkgate, Cheshire, for Dublin, and founders in the Irish Sea; she carries 70,000 Irish pounds in money and £80,000 in goods, while among the 60 passengers lost are Edward, fifth Earl of Drogheda, Theophilus Cibber (the English actor, bound for a season at the Smock Alley Theatre), and (probably) the mezzotint engraver Michael Ford.
- The agriculturalist Richard Geoghegan reclaims a large tract of land from the sea at Ballyconneely in County Galway.
- Mineral spring discovered at Lucan, Dublin.

== Births ==
- 26 March – Samuel Greg, entrepreneur and pioneer of the factory system at Quarry Bank Mill (died 1834).
- December – Mary Leadbeater, writer (died 1826).
- Hans Blackwood, 3rd Baron Dufferin and Claneboye, politician (died 1839).
- Approximate date – Charles "Hindoo" Stuart, East India Company officer (died 1828 in India).

== Deaths ==
- October – Michael Ford, mezzotint engraver.
