= Samuel Mullen =

Samuel Mullen (27 November 1828 – 29 May 1890) was an Irish-born bookseller, active in Australia.

Mullen was born in Dublin, Ireland, the son of George Mullen, a bookseller, and his wife Eliza, née Orson. Mullen was educated at Nuttgrove College and later at Trinity College, Dublin. At age 16, Mullen was indentured to an apothecary, but did not like the work.

Mullen died 29 May 1890. Mullen was married twice, firstly to Eliza Moss (died 15 October 1868) and secondly to Wilhelmina Wild on 17 September 1870. Mullen was survived by children from both marriages.

Mullen's business continued on in Collins Street until 1922, when it merged with George Robertson and Company under the name of Robertson and Mullens Ltd.
