= Charles Cuffe =

Irish cricketer (1914–1972)

Cricket information
- Batting: Left-handed

International information
- National side: Ireland

Career statistics
Competition	First-class
Matches	3
Runs scored	61
Batting average	15.25
100s/50s	0/0
Top score	18
Catches/stumpings	2/4
- Source: CricketArchive, 10 October 2022

Charles Richard Cuffe (5 August 1914 – 10 November 1972) was an Irish cricketer. A left-handed batsman and wicket-keeper, he made his debut for the Ireland cricket team against the MCC in August 1936 and went on to play for them on 14 occasions, his last match coming against Sir Julien Cahn's XI in August 1939. Three of his matches for Ireland had first-class status.
