= 1747 in Ireland =

- Centuries: 16th; 17th; 18th; 19th; 20th
- Decades: 1720s; 1730s; 1740s; 1750s; 1760s
- See also: Other events of 1747; List of years in Ireland

Events from the year 1747 in Ireland.

== Incumbent ==
- Monarch: George II

== Events ==
- 19 January – "Kelly riots" at the Smock Alley Theatre in Dublin when Thomas Sheridan, the proprietor, is in dispute with some gentlemen.
- 28 February – George Stone, Church of Ireland Bishop of Derry, is elevated to Archbishop of Armagh and Primate of All Ireland (letters patent 13 March), an office he will hold until 1764.
- 21 April – Edmund Burke sets up Burke's Club, a debating society at Trinity College Dublin, which will become the College Historical Society.
- 9–14 August – John Wesley pays his first visit to Ireland.
- 14 August – death of Thaddeus McCarthy, last Roman Catholic Bishop of Cork and Cloyne. The see is separated into the bishopric of Cork and the bishopric of Cloyne and Ross.
- 9 September–20 March 1748 – Charles Wesley pays his first visit to Ireland.
- 11 September – Daniel O'Reilly is appointed to succeed Ross MacMahon as Roman Catholic Bishop of Clogher, an office he will hold until 1778.

== Births ==
- February – Daniel Delany, Bishop of Kildare and Leighton (1787–1814), founder of Carlow College (1793), Brigidine Sisters (1807) and Patrician Brothers (1808).
- 8 April – William Hales, clergyman and scientific writer (died 1831).
- 27 December – R. Luke Concanen, Dominican priest, consecrated first bishop of the Roman Catholic Diocese of New York (died 1810 in Naples).
- John Dunlap, printer of the United States Declaration of Independence (died 1812 in the United States).
- Andrew Robinson Stoney, adventurer (died 1810 in King's Bench Prison, London).

== Deaths ==
- 27 May – Bernard MacMahon, Roman Catholic Archbishop of Armagh (born 1680).
- Anthony Duane, businessman in America (born 1679).
