= Jerome Alley =

Irish priest, poet and author

- Born: 1760
- Died: 1826 (aged 65–66)
- Education: Trinity College, Dublin

Jerome Alley (1760–1826) was an Irish poet and author. He was married firstly to Miss Maria Holroyd, with whom he had a son, George Holroyd Alley, and a second baby who died at birth. Maria died some four months later. She was a cousin of John Baker Holroyd (Lord Sheffield).

After being educated at Trinity College, Dublin, he became Rector of Drumcar in diocese of Armagh. His married his second wife Lady Katherine Waller, the widow of Sir Robert Waller, in December 1783. They had several children together as well as Waller's children from her first marriage.

A Compendium of Irish Biography states that "He was the author of several poems and pamphlets. In 1826, shortly before his death, he published a work about the various religions of the world." Rev. Jerome Alley has memorials in St. Brigid's Church, Drogheda, now a privately owned chapel.
