= 1748 in Ireland =

- Centuries: 16th; 17th; 18th; 19th; 20th
- Decades: 1720s; 1730s; 1740s; 1750s; 1760s
- See also: Other events of 1748; List of years in Ireland

Events from the year 1748 in Ireland.

== Incumbent ==
- Monarch: George II

== Events ==
- Leinster House (at this time called Kildare House) in the unfashionable south side of Dublin is completed as a residence for James FitzGerald, Earl of Kildare by Richard Cassels.
- 9 April: the Newtown Act, allowing non-resident burgesses in parliamentary boroughs, is given royal assent.

== Births ==
- 22 May – Thomas Roberts, landscape painter (died 1778).
- Denis Daly, landowner, MP and Mayor of Galway (died 1791).
- Alexander Macomb, senior, merchant and land speculator with Macomb's Purchase in New York (died 1831 in the United States).
- John Ramage, miniature painter (died 1802).
- Approximate date – Henry Conwell, Catholic Bishop of Philadelphia (died 1842).

== Deaths ==
- May – Walter Blake, politician.
- 16 August – Sir James Somerville, 1st Baronet, politician.
- 29 October – Ross Roe MacMahon, Roman Catholic Bishop of Clogher, later Archbishop of Armagh (born 1698).
