= 1826 in Ireland =

- Centuries: 17th; 18th; 19th; 20th; 21st
- Decades: 1800s; 1810s; 1820s; 1830s; 1840s
- See also: 1826 in the United Kingdom; Other events of 1826; List of years in Ireland

Events from the year 1826 in Ireland.

== Events ==
- 5 January – Irish currency assimilated to that of Great Britain under terms of the Currency Act 1825.
- 12 July – in the United Kingdom General Election, four counties elect supporters of Catholic emancipation.
- The Landlord and Tenant (Ireland) Act is passed.
- First life-boat stationed in Ireland by the National Institution for the Preservation of Life from Shipwreck, at Arklow.

== Arts and literature ==
- October – Tyrone Power gets his break as a principal Irish character actor at the Theatre Royal, Covent Garden in London.

== Births ==
- March
  - James P. Boyd, businessman and politician in Ontario (died 1890).
  - John Farrell, soldier and recipient of the Victoria Cross for gallantry at the 1854 Charge of the Light Brigade (died 1865).
- 13 August – Robert Spencer Dyer Lyons, physician and politician (died 1886).
- 4 October – Richard Smyth, Presbyterian minister, academic and politician (died 1878).
- 2 November – Henry John Stephen Smith, mathematician (died 1883).
- 14 November – Michael Morris, 1st Baron Killanin, jurist, politician, Lord Chief Justice of Ireland (died 1901).
  Full date unknown
  - Robert Cain, brewer and businessman (died 1907).
  - Morgan Crofton, mathematician (died 1915).
  - Denis Dempsey, soldier, recipient of the Victoria Cross (died 1896).
  - Samuel Hill, soldier, recipient of the Victoria Cross for gallantry in 1857 at Lucknow, India, later killed in action (died 1863).
  - John Lucas, soldier, recipient of the Victoria Cross for gallantry in 1861 in New Zealand (died 1892).
  - Patrick McHale, soldier, recipient of the Victoria Cross for gallantry in 1857 at Lucknow, India (died 1866).
  - Alexander Wright, soldier, recipient of the Victoria Cross for gallantry in 1855 at Sebastopol, in the Crimea (died 1858).

== Deaths ==
- 27 June – Mary Leadbeater, writer (born 1758).
- 25 September – Judge Fulton, judge, surveyor, politician, and founder of the village of Bass River, Nova Scotia (born 1739).
- 9 October – Michael Kelly, actor, singer and composer (born 1762).

== See also ==
- 1826 in Scotland
- 1826 in Wales
