= Charles Hill (cricketer) =

Irish cricketer

Personal information
- Full name: Charles Merrin Hill
- Born: 18 July 1903; Dublin, Ireland
- Died: 7 July 1982 (aged 78); Dublin, Leinster, Ireland
- Batting: Right-handed

Domestic team information
- Years: Team
- 1927: Ireland

Career statistics
Competition	First-class
Matches	1
Runs scored	5
Batting average	5.00
100s/50s	–/–
Top score	5
Catches/stumpings	–/–
- Source: Cricinfo, 29 October 2021

Charles Merrin Hill (18 July 1903 in Dublin, Ireland – 7 July 1982 in Dublin) was an Irish cricketer. A right-handed batsman, he played just once for the Ireland cricket team, a first-class match against Scotland in July 1927.
