= 1825 in Ireland =

- Centuries: 17th; 18th; 19th; 20th; 21st
- Decades: 1800s; 1810s; 1820s; 1830s; 1840s
- See also: 1825 in the United Kingdom; Other events of 1825; List of years in Ireland

Events from the year 1825 in Ireland.

== Events ==
- 9 March – the Unlawful Societies (Ireland) Act proscribes both the Catholic Association and the Orange Order.
- May – the British Ordnance Survey begins its survey of Ireland.
- 27 June – the Excise Licences Act raises Irish excise licences to bring them in line with those of Great Britain.
- Foundation of the Provincial Bank of Ireland.
- Portlaw in County Waterford is established as a model village by the Malcomson family, Quaker cotton mill owners.
- Paddle steamers (Dasher and Arrow) first introduced on the Portpatrick to Donaghadee packet service.
- Over 1,800 Irish residents leave Cork to emigrate to Peterborough, Ontario, Canada, in a scheme administered by Canadian trader and politician Peter Robinson.

== Arts and literature ==
- April – the first series of Tales by the O'Hara Family, by John and Michael Banim, is published.
- May – the Royal Hibernian Academy holds its first exhibition of art in Dublin.
- Thomas Crofton Croker publishes the first volumes of his Fairy Legends and Traditions of the South of Ireland.
- Charles Maturin's novel Leixlip Castle is published posthumously.
- William Hamilton Maxwell's military adventure novel O'Hara is published.
- Sydney, Lady Morgan, publishes Absenteeism.

== Births ==
- 26 January – James Stephens, founding member of the Fenian Brotherhood movement (died 1901).
- 13 April – D'Arcy McGee, journalist and politician in Canada (assassinated 1868).
- 16 May
  - Valentine Browne, 4th Earl of Kenmare, peer (died 1905).
  - John McGovern, soldier, recipient of the Victoria Cross for gallantry in 1857 at Delhi, India (died 1888).
- 17 June – Richard Harte Keatinge, recipient of the Victoria Cross for gallantry in 1858 at Chundairee, India (died 1904).
- 4 November – Frederick Dobson Middleton, British Army general and commander of the Canadian Militia in the North-West Rebellion (died 1898).
  Full date unknown
  - William Dowling, soldier, recipient of the Victoria Cross for gallantry in 1857 at Lucknow, India (died 1887).
  - Myles O'Reilly, Catholic soldier and writer (died 1880).

== Deaths ==
- 6 February – John Connolly, second bishop of the Roman Catholic diocese of New York (born 1750).
- 22 August – Richard Hely-Hutchinson, 1st Earl of Donoughmore, politician (born 1756).
- John Templeton, naturalist and botanist (born 1766).

== See also ==
- 1825 in Scotland
- 1825 in Wales
