= 1913 in Ireland =

- Centuries: 18th; 19th; 20th; 21st
- Decades: 1890s; 1900s; 1910s; 1920s; 1930s
- See also: 1913 in the United Kingdom; Other events of 1913; List of years in Ireland

Events from the year 1913 in Ireland.

== Events ==
- 13 January – Edward Carson founded the Ulster Volunteer Force by unifying several existing loyalist militias.
- 30 January – At Westminster the House of Lords rejected the 3rd Home Rule Bill by 326 to 69.
- 10 February – John Redmond opened the replacement city bridge over the River Suir in Waterford that will be named after him.
- 7 July – The Home Rule Bill was once again carried in the House of Commons, despite attempts by Bonar Law to obstruct it.
- 26 August – Dublin Lock-out: members of James Larkin's Irish Transport and General Workers' Union employed by the Dublin United Tramways Company began strike action in defiance of the dismissal of trade union members by the chairman, businessman William Martin Murphy.
- 31 August – Dublin Lock-out: the Dublin Metropolitan Police killed one demonstrator and injured 400 in dispersing a demonstration in Sackville Street (Dublin).
- 1 September – Protest by locked-out workers led to serious riots in Dublin. Shops were looted and attempts made to tear up tram lines.

Dublin Metropolitan Police break up a union rally on Sackville Street, August 1913

- 2 September – Two tenement houses in Church Street, Dublin, collapsed, killing 7 (including 2 children) and leaving 11 families homeless.
- 3 September – A meeting of 400 employers with William Martin Murphy pledged not to employ any persons who continued to be members of the Irish Transport & General Workers' Union.
- 7 September – A large meeting in Sackville Street asserted the right of free speech, trade union representation, and demanded an enquiry into police conduct.
- 17 September
  - In Newry, Edward Carson said that a Provisional Government would be established in Ulster if Home Rule was introduced.
  - In Dublin, labour unrest grew with a march of 5,000 people through the city.
- 27 September – Twelve thousand Ulster Volunteers paraded at the Royal Ulster Agricultural Society's show grounds at Balmoral in Belfast to protest against the Home Rule Bill.
- 27 September – In Dublin, the food ship, The Hare, arrived bringing forty tons of food raised by British trade unionists.
- 6 October – An official report on the lockout suggested that workers should be reinstated without having to give a pledge not to join the Irish Transport and General Workers' Union.
- 16 October – Four thousand men and women marched through Dublin in support of James Larkin and the Transport Union.
- 27 October – James Larkin of the Irish Transport and General Workers' Union was sentenced to seven months in prison for seditious language but was released after just over a week.
- 1 November
  - Kingstown trade unionist James Byrne, arrested for his part in the lockout, died as the result of a hunger strike.
  - Professor Eoin MacNeill's article, The North Began, suggesting formation of pro-self-government Irish Volunteers, appeared in the Gaelic League newspaper An Claidheamh Soluis, at the suggestion of The O'Rahilly.
- 10 November – The Dublin Volunteer Corps enrolled over 2,000 men. They declared that they would preserve the "civil and religious liberties" of Protestants outside Ulster in the event of Irish Home Rule.
- 19 November – The Irish Citizen Army was founded by James Larkin, Jack White, and James Connolly to protect workers in the general lockout.
- 25 November – The pro-Home Rule Irish Volunteers were formed at a meeting attended by 4,000 men in the Rotunda Rink in Dublin.
- 28 November – Bonar Law addressed a huge unionist rally in the Theatre Royal in Dublin, declaring that if Home Rule was introduced Ulster would resist and would have the support of his party.

== Arts and literature ==
- George A. Birmingham's comedy General John Regan was premièred in London (8 January) and New York City (13 November).
- Winifred Mary Letts published Songs from Leinster.
- Conal Holmes O'Connell O'Riordan produced his play Rope Enough.
- Pádraig Ó Siochfhradha's story An Baile S’Againne was published.
- Katharine Tynan's Irish Poems was published.
- W. B. Yeats' poem "September 1913" was published in The Irish Times during the Dublin Lock-out (8 September). His Poems Written in Discouragement is also published this year.
- English barrister and lyricist Frederic Weatherly published the ballad "Danny Boy" set to the Londonderry Air.
- English music hall comedian Arthur Lucan met and married (25 November) 16-year-old actress Kitty McShane in Dublin.

== Sport ==
=== Association football ===
- International
  18 January Ireland 0–1 Wales (in Belfast)
  15 February Ireland 2–1 England (in Belfast)
  15 March Ireland 1–2 Scotland (in Dublin)
  Irish League
  Winners: Glentoran
  Irish Cup
  Winners: Linfield 2–0 Glentoran
- Derry Celtic were relegated and subsequently voted out of the Irish Football League; they never played senior football again.

=== Gaelic games ===
- All-Ireland Senior Football Championship 1913 Winners: Kerry
- All-Ireland Senior Hurling Championship 1913 Winners: Kilkenny

== Births ==
- 19 January – Matt O'Mahoney, international soccer player (died 1992).
- 22 January – William Conway, Cardinal Archbishop of Armagh (died 1977).
- 30 January – Kevin Danaher, folklorist and writer (died 2002).
- 15 February – William Scott, Ulster Scots painter (died 1989).
- 13 March – Joe Kelly, motor racing driver (died 1993).
- 29 March – Niall MacGinnis, actor (died circa 1977).
- 13 April – David Grene, classical scholar (died 2002).
- 14 April – Galbraith Lowry-Corry, 7th Earl Belmore, soldier and deputy lieutenant for County Fermanagh (died 1960).
- 1 May – Maurice Gibson, Northern Irish judge (died 1987).
- 19 May – Seán Moore, Fianna Fáil party TD (died 1986).
- 5 June – Peter Doherty, footballer (died 1990).
- 6 June – Patrick Campbell, 3rd Baron Glenavy, journalist and author (died 1980).
- 17 August – Harry Baird, soccer player (died 1973).
- 28 August – John Mackey, Limerick hurler (died 1989).
- 31 August – Jack Doyle, boxer, actor and singer (died 1978).
- 20 September – Bernard Bergin, cricketer (died 1985).
- 23 September – Samuel Edgar, cricketer (died 1937).
- 25 September – Tony O'Malley, painter (died 2003).
- 9 October – Harry Bradshaw, golfer (died 1990).
- 18 October – David Lord, Royal Air Force pilot, posthumous recipient of the Victoria Cross for gallantry at Arnhem (died 1944).
- V24 November – Geraldine Fitzgerald, film & television actress (died 2005)
- 3 December – Gerry Healy, British Trotskyist leader (died 1989).
- Full date unknown – Sigerson Clifford, poet and playwright (died 1985).

== Deaths ==
- 3 January – James Hamilton, 2nd Duke of Abercorn, politician and diplomat (born 1838).
- 21 February – John Joseph Hogan, first Bishop of the Dioceses of Saint Joseph, Missouri and Kansas City, Missouri (born 1829).
- 15 March – Max Arthur Macauliffe, British administrator, scholar and author (born 1841).
- 25 March – Garnet Wolseley, 1st Viscount Wolseley, soldier (born 1833).
- 4 April – Edward Dowden, critic and poet (born 1843).
- 6 April – Somerset Lowry-Corry, 4th Earl Belmore, soldier, politician and Lord Lieutenant for County Tyrone (born 1835).
- 17 April – Barton McGuckin, tenor singer (born 1852).
- 25 April – Arthur Thomas Moore, soldier, recipient of the Victoria Cross for gallantry in 1857 at the Battle of Khushab, Persia (born 1830).
- 22 May – Edward Gibson, 1st Baron Ashbourne, lawyer and Lord Chancellor of Ireland (born 1837).
- 1 June – James O'Halloran, lawyer and politician in Quebec (born circa 1820).
- 1 October – Eugene O'Keefe, businessman and philanthropist in Canada (born 1827).
- 5 October – Patrick Augustine Sheehan, priest, author and political activist (born 1852).
- 19 October – Emily Lawless, writer, died in England (born 1845).
- 18 December – Thomas Kingsmill Abbott, scholar and educator (born 1829 1829).
