= John Barrett (Hebrew scholar) =

John Barrett (1753 – 15 November 1821) of Trinity College Dublin, Ireland, was a noted Hebrew scholar.

== Career ==
Barrett was born the son of a Church of Ireland priest in County Laois. He was known as a Trinity College Dublin don for most of his career and was recognized as an eccentric. He saved his income and left £80,000 "to feed the hungry and clothe the naked" upon his death.
