= Kilwarlin Moravian Church =

Church in County Down, Northern Ireland

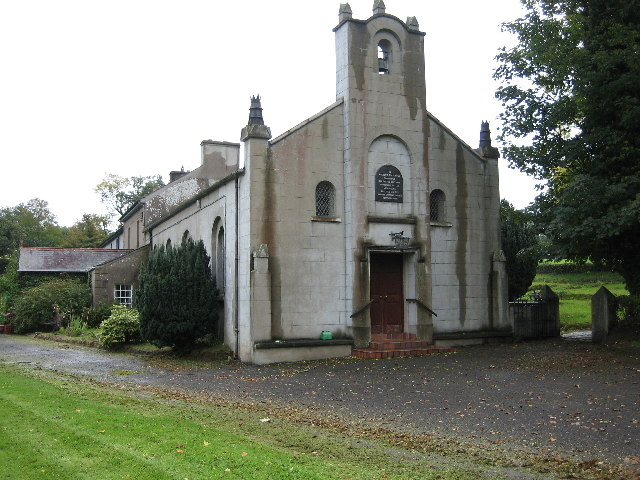
- Kilwarlin Moravian Church
- Kilwarlin Moravian Church
- 54.463603°N 6.135693°W
- Location: Kilwarlin
- Country: Northern Ireland
- Language: English
- Denomination: Moravian Church
- Website: www.moravian.org.uk/a-living-church/congregations-of-the-moravian-church/104-irish-district/95-kilwarlin-moravian-church

History
- Founded: 1755

Architecture
- Completed: 1835

Administration
- District: Irish District
- Province: British Province

Kilwarlin Moravian Church was founded in 1755 by the evangelist John Cennick following a Moravian mission in Ireland that began in Dublin in 1746. Kilwarlin is a small village near Hillsborough in County Down.

== History ==
John Cennick, a teacher at the Moravian School for the children of miners in Kingswood, worked alongside John Wesley in the evangelical revival in the Bristol area of England. He subsequently became a Minister of the Moravian Church. In 1746, he was sent to Dublin to preach in an evangelical campaign in Ireland. This work resulted in Moravian societies in counties Antrim, Down, Londonderry, Armagh, Tyrone, Cavan and Donegal.

Cennick founded the Kilwarlin congregation in 1755 and built a church for it. In 1759, the congregation purchased some land for a burial ground. There was also a manse for the minister's residence. About eighty people attended the church. However, by 1834, the buildings were in ruins and only six members remained.

Kilwarlin's renewal came with the arrival of a new minister, Basil Patras Zula.

Zula, born in 1796, was a Greek chieftain who had fought in the War of Independence against the Turks. The Turkish commander put a price on Zula's head and this, together with subsequent ambushes, appears to have induced a nervous state of mind for the remainder of the latter's life. He spent some time hiding in Italy but, in 1822, returned to Greece to take part in the siege of Missolonghi. The slaughter revolting him, he went to Smyrna where he met an Englishman, Sir William Eden. Eden returned to England in 1828, taking Zula with him, and, from there, the two men went to Ireland.

In Dublin, Zula met a Moravian school teacher called Ann Linfoot who knew Greek and was able to converse with him. Linfoot invited Zula to attend services at the Bishop Street Moravian Church in Dublin. Joining the congregation, Zula eventually offered himself for service as a Minister of the Moravian Church and was accepted. In 1829, he married Ann Linfoot and, in 1834, the couple accepted a call to serve the Kilwarlin congregation.

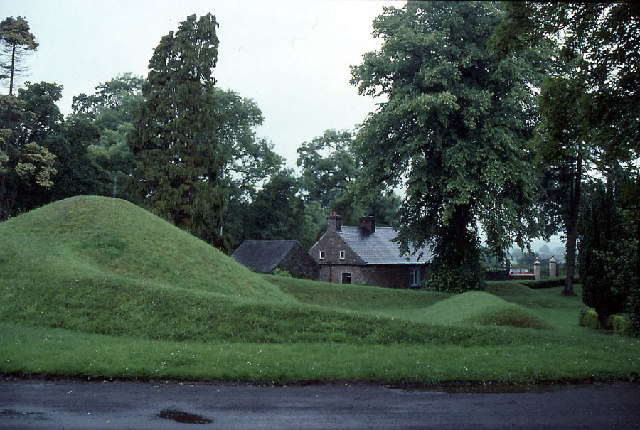
Zula's groundworks at Kilwarlin after Thermopylæ

A new church was built and opened for worship in March 1835. Twenty-six new members joined the congregation on the same day. The congregation continued to expand and, in January 1837, Zula was ordained by Hans Peter Hallbeck, a Moravian bishop from South Africa.

When rebuilding Kilwarlin Manse, Zula incorporated 'a number of escape mechanisms — two doors in all the downstairs rooms, two separate staircases and outside at the back a small room built on stilts with a trap-door leading to a hiding place under the floor'. Zula never had to put these devices to use and died naturally in Dublin on 4 October 1844. His body was brought back to Kilwarlin for burial. His widow, Ann, continued to live in the manse and ran a boarding school for 'Select Young Ladies' until her own death in 1858.

A curious feature of Kilwarlin Moravian Church is that Zula, at his own expense, had the grounds landscaped to represent the terrain of the ancient Battle of Thermopylæ in which the Spartan army saved Athens from attack by the Persians. Most of the landscaping still remains.

== Bibliography ==
- Hutton, Joseph Edmund (2004-06-30). History of the Moravian Church. Whitefish, Montana: Kessinger. ISBN 9781419124259. OCLC 793203025. OL 8471022M.
