= 1915 in Ireland =

- Centuries: 18th; 19th; 20th; 21st
- Decades: 1890s; 1900s; 1910s; 1920s; 1930s
- See also: 1915 in the United Kingdom; Other events of 1915; List of years in Ireland

== Events ==
- March – Construction in Queenstown of St Colman's Cathedral, Cobh, concluded with completion of the spire.
- 4 April – Twenty-five thousand National Volunteers assembled at the Phoenix Park, Dublin. John Redmond took the salute from under the statue of Charles Stewart Parnell on Sackville Street.
- 5 April – At the National Volunteers convention at the Mansion House, Dublin, John Redmond praised their response to World War I.
- 7 May – Sinking of the Lusitania: British ocean liner RMS Lusitania was sunk by Imperial German Navy U-boat U-20 about 11 miles (18 km) off Old Head of Kinsale, County Cork, killing 1,198 civilians en route from New York to Liverpool, among them the Irish-born art dealer and benefactor Sir Hugh Lane and Irish composer and conductor Thomas O'Brien Butler.

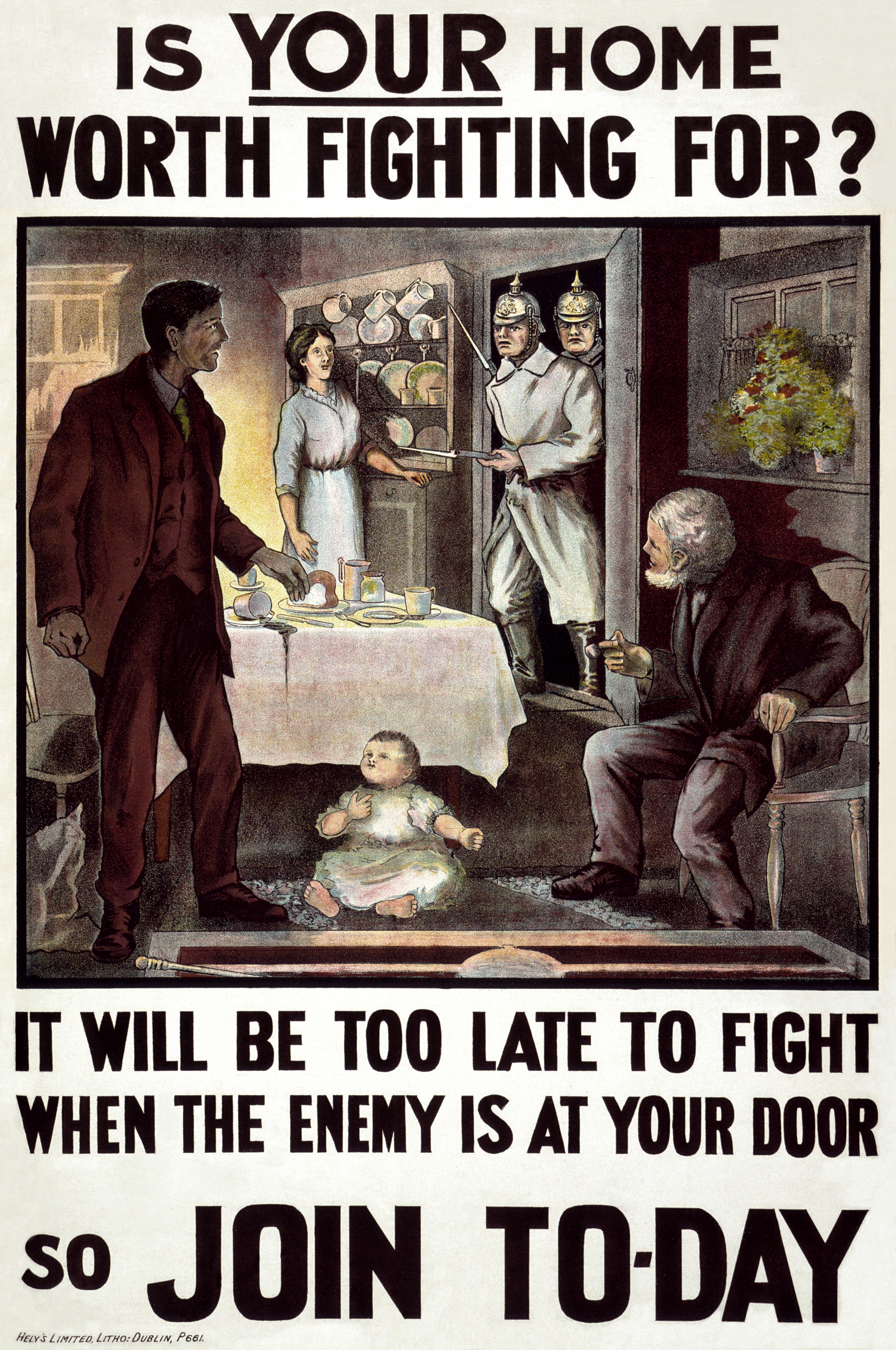
Recruitment poster issued from Dublin, July 1915

- 25 May – The prime minister of the United Kingdom formed the Asquith coalition ministry, a national wartime coalition government of twelve Liberals, eight Unionists and one Labour member. In Dublin, the Irish Parliamentary Party approved John Redmond's decision not to join.
- 29 July – Republicans, led by Patrick Pearse, took over the Gaelic League at its Dundalk conference. Douglas Hyde resigned as its president.
- 1 August – O'Donovan Rossa was buried at Glasnevin Cemetery in Dublin, and Patrick Pearse delivered the graveside oration ("Ireland unfree shall never be at peace").
- 26 December – The Irish Republican Brotherhood Military Council decided to stage an Easter Rising in 1916.
- The Elim Pentecostal Church was founded in Monaghan by Welsh evangelist George Jeffreys.

== Arts and literature ==
- 1 February – Helen Waddell's first play, The Spoiled Buddha, was premiered at the Opera House, Belfast, by the Ulster Literary Society.
- Francis Ledwidge's poems Songs of the Fields were published.
- James Stephens' poems The Adventures of Seumas Beg: the Rocky Road to Dublin and Songs from the Clay were published.
- The first dramatic film made in Ireland, Fun at Finglas Fair, was directed by F. J. McCormick. It was never released as all prints were destroyed in the Easter Rising of April 1916.

== Sport ==
=== Association football ===
- Irish League
  Winners: Belfast Celtic
- Irish Cup
  Winners: Linfield 1–0 Belfast Celtic

== Births ==
- 11 January – Paddy Mayne, international rugby union footballer and decorated soldier (died 1955).
- 13 January – Kit Ahern, Fianna Fáil party Teachta Dála (TD) (died 2007).
- 21 January – Andy O'Brien, Fine Gael party senator from County Cavan (died 2006).
- 25 January – Liam Cunningham, Fianna Fáil TD (died 1976).
- 7 February – Mark Clinton, Fine Gael TD, Minister for Agriculture and Member of the European Parliament (died 2001).
- 15 February – Sam Kydd, actor (died 1982).
- 15 March – Micho Russell, tin whistle player and collector of traditional music and folklore (died 1994).
- 9 April – Leonard Wibberley, author (died 1983).
- 2 May – George Harrison, member of the Provisional Irish Republican Army and alleged gun-runner (died 2004).
- 3 May – Walter Macken, novelist, dramatist and actor (died 1967).
- 17 May – Oisín Kelly, sculptor (died 1981).
- 18 June – Joan Trimble, composer, pianist and newspaper proprietor (died 2000).
- 19 July – Rita Childers, First Lady of Ireland (died 2010)
- 6 August – Tom O'Reilly, Cavan Gaelic footballer and independent TD for Cavan 1944–1948 (died 1995)
- 28 August – Patrick Hennessy, painter (died 1980).
- 16 September – Eddie Filgate, Fianna Fáil TD (died 2017).
- 16 October – Jim Young, Cork hurler (died 1992).
- 18 September – James Tully, Labour Party TD and cabinet minister (died 1992).
- 7 November – Bill Hayes, football player (died 1987).
- 20 December – Noel Browne, politician, cabinet minister (died 1997).

Full date unknown:

- John Graham, Irish Republican Army activist in the 1940s (died 1997).
- Willie Murphy, Cork hurler (died 1977).

== Deaths ==
- 20 January – Arthur Guinness, Baron Ardilaun, businessman, politician, and philanthropist (born 1840).
- 26 January – Michael Sullivan, physician, professor and politician in Canada (born 1838).
- 28 January – David Dickson Rogers, politician in Ontario (born 1845).
- 14 February – Cornelius Coughlan, soldier, recipient of the Victoria Cross for gallantry in 1857 at Delhi, India (born 1828).
- 24 April – Frederick William Hall, soldier, posthumous recipient of the Victoria Cross for gallantry in 1915 during the Second Battle of Ypres in Belgium (born 1885).
- 7 May – On board the RMS Lusitania:
  - O'Brien Butler, composer (born 1861).
  - Hugh Lane, established Municipal Gallery of Modern Art in Dublin (born 1875).
- 29 June – Jeremiah O'Donovan Rossa, Fenian leader (born 1831).
- 2 August – William Abraham, Irish Nationalist Member of Parliament (born 1840).
- 21 August – Gerald Robert O'Sullivan, recipient of the Victoria Cross for gallantry in 1915 at Gallipoli, Turkey (born 1888).
- 21 August – Thomas Pakenham, 5th Earl of Longford, peer and soldier (born 1864).
- 25 September – Joseph Lynch, cricketer (born 1880).
- 10 October – Albert Cashier, soldier in the Union Army during the American Civil War, physically female, but lived as a man (born 1843).
- 21 December – Violet Florence Martin, author (born 1862).
