= 1907 in Ireland =

- Centuries: 18th; 19th; 20th; 21st
- Decades: 1880s; 1890s; 1900s; 1910s; 1920s
- See also: 1907 in the United Kingdom; Other events of 1907; List of years in Ireland

Events in the year 1907 in Ireland.

== Events ==
- 2 January – A new system of rail cars running from Dublin Amiens Street station to Howth was introduced.
- 5 January – The first motor show under the auspices of the Irish Automobile Club opened at the Royal Dublin Society.
- 6 January – The Sunday provisions of the new Licensing Act come into operation in Dublin and four other cities. Sunday opening hours would be from 2 pm to 5 pm.
- 26 January – The first performance of J. M. Synge's play The Playboy of the Western World at the Abbey Theatre in Dublin triggered a week of rioting.
- 4 May – The Irish International Exhibition opened in Dublin.
- 7 May – Augustine Birrell introduced the Irish Council Bill; it was rejected by a Nationalist convention on 21 May and dropped by the government on 3 June.
- 6 July – The Crown Jewels of Ireland, valued at £50,000, were stolen from a safe in Dublin Castle.
- 10–11 July – King Edward VII and Queen Alexandra made a state visit to attend the Irish International Exhibition in Dublin.
- 26 July – A large rally was held in Belfast City Hall in support of the continuing Dockers and Carters strike.
- 4 September – An Irish Parliamentary Party meeting in the Mansion House, Dublin was disrupted by Sinn Féin who held a demonstration outside.
- 17 October – The Marconi transatlantic wireless telegraphy service between Galway and Canada was opened. Messages were exchanged without a hitch.
- 9 November – The Irish International Exhibition ended after six months. An estimated 2.75 million people visited it, including a large number from abroad.
- November – Irish republican Tom Clarke returned to Ireland from the United States.

== Arts and literature ==
- 26 January – Large sections of the audience booed the opening performance of J. M. Synge's The Playboy of the Western World at the Abbey Theatre.
- 28 January – Another performance of The Playboy of the Western World at the Abbey Theatre was interrupted by the audience who continued to boo, hiss and shout.
- 4 February – In a public debate at the Abbey Theatre, the poet W. B. Yeats denied trying to suppress audience distaste during a performance of The Playboy of the Western World.
- May – James Joyce's poems Chamber Music were published.
- Early – Seven-year-old future author Elizabeth Bowen moved with her mother from Ireland to the south of England.
- Publication of Padraic Colum's poems Wild Earth.
- Peadar Kearney and Patrick Heeney wrote A Soldier's Song (with English lyrics); it later became Amhrán na bhFiann (in Irish), the Irish national anthem.
- Publication of County Cork-born retired Chicago chief of police Francis O'Neill's collection The Dance Music of Ireland.

== Sport ==
=== Association football ===
- International
  16 February – England 1–0 Ireland (in Liverpool)
  23 February – Ireland 2–3 Wales (in Belfast)
  16 March – Scotland 3–0 Ireland (in Glasgow)
- Irish League
  Winners: Linfield F.C.
  Irish Cup
  Winners: Cliftonville F.C. 0–0, 1–0 Shelbourne F.C.

=== Golf ===
- The British Ladies Amateur Golf Championship was held at Royal County Down Golf Club, (winner: May Hezlet).

== Births ==
- 21 February – Colville Deverell, cricketer and politician (died 1995).
- 1 March – Robert Malachy Burke, Christian Socialist and philanthropist (died 1998).
- 15 May – John Galvin, Fianna Fáil party TD (died 1963).
- 1 June – Helen Megaw, crystallographer (died 2002 in Northern Ireland).
- 2 June – Dan O'Keeffe, Kerry Gaelic footballer (died 1967).
- 29 June – Paul O'Dwyer, lawyer and politician in the United States (died 1998).
- 13 July – John David Gwynn, cricketer (died 1998).
- 15 July – Séamus Murphy, sculptor (died 1975).
- 14 August – H. Montgomery Hyde, barrister, author and Ulster Unionist Member of Parliament (MP) (died 1989 in Northern Ireland).
- 14 September
  - Janet McNeill, novelist and playwright (died 1994 in England)
  - Edel Quinn, lay missionary (died 1944).
- 8 October – J. G. Devlin, actor (died 1991 in Northern Ireland).
- 28 October – John Hewitt, poet (died 1987 in Northern Ireland).
- 1 November – Bill Loughery, cricketer (died 1977 in Northern Ireland).
- 26 November – Theodore William Moody, historian (died 1984).
- 19 December – Jimmy McLarnin, boxer (died 2004 in Northern Ireland).
  Full date unknown
  - Desmond Clarke, librarian and writer (died 1979).
  - Maura Laverty, writer, journalist, and broadcaster (died 1966).
  - Áine Ní Cheanainn, educationalist (died 1999)
  - Margot Ruddock, actress, poet, and singer (died 1951).
  - Henry Tyrell-Smith, motor cycle racer (died 1982).

== Deaths ==
- 16 January – Daniel John O'Donoghue, printer, labour leader, and politician in Ontario (born 1844).
- 20 January – Agnes Mary Clerke, astronomer and writer (born 1842).
- 31 January – Timothy Eaton, businessman, founded Eaton's department store in Canada (born 1834).
- 11 February – William Howard Russell, journalist (born 1821).
- 16 March – John O'Leary, Irish poet and Fenian (born 1830).
- 9 April – Owen Hall, theatre writer and critic (born 1853).
- 1 May – John Kells Ingram, poet, scholar, economist, and historian of economic thought (born 1823).
- 10 June – Alexander John Arbuthnot, British official in India and writer (born 1822).
- 8 July – John Horgan, politician and member of the Western Australian Legislative Council (born 1834).
- 3 August – Augustus Saint-Gaudens, sculptor (born 1848).
- 7 August – James Brenan, artist (born 1837).
- 13 August – George Charlemont, former Gaelic footballer (born 1873).
- 17 November – Francis Leopold McClintock, Royal Navy officer, explorer in Canadian Arctic Archipelago (born 1819).
- 17 December – William Thomson, 1st Baron Kelvin, mathematical physicist, engineer, and leader in the physical sciences (born 1824).
  Full date unknown
  - Robert Cain, brewer and businessman (born 1826).
  - Denis Kearney, politician in America (born 1847).

== See also ==
- 1922 in Scotland
- 1922 in Wales
