= Blake, Cassels & Graydon =

Canadian legal firm

Blake, Cassels & Graydon LLP
- Headquarters: Toronto, Ontario, Canada
- No. of offices: 7
- No. of lawyers: 685 (2022)
- Key people: Geoff Belsher (Chairman); Bryson A. Stokes (Managing Partner)
- Date founded: 1856
- Founder: Edward Blake
- Company type: Limited liability partnership
- Website: www.blakes.com

Blake, Cassels & Graydon LLP (Blakes) is an international corporate law firm with offices in Montreal, Ottawa, Toronto, Calgary, Vancouver, New York City, and London.

== History ==
The name Blakes referred to the founding brothers Edward Blake and Samuel Hume Blake, two prominent members of Toronto society in the early years of Canadian Confederation. Edward was best known for being the second Premier of Ontario (1871-72), and for leading the Liberal Party in Canada’s second, fifth and sixth elections held respectively in 1872, 1882 and 1891, being the party’s only leader who was never Prime Minister until the 2000s. Edward was called to the bar in the fall of 1856. He was briefly in partnership with Stephen Maule Jarvis but they parted ways after just a year. Instead, he entered partnership with Samuel upon the younger brother’s admittance by the Law Society as a solicitor in 1858. As Edward’s time was increasingly consumed by politics, Samuel oversaw the rapid success of the firm, while supporting his brother’s as an organizer and bagman for the Liberal Party. They both became benchers of the law society in 1871. In 1872, Edward resigned as premier to devote his full attention to leading the national Liberal Party and was succeeded by Oliver Mowat. Samuel succeeded Mowat as the vice-chancellor of the Ontario Court of Chancery, the same court their father William Hume Blake reformed while he was Solicitor-General for Upper Canada and served as chancellor from 1849 to 1862.

In November 1859, the firm was renamed Blake, Cawthra & Blake when Henry Cawthra joined partnership

In 1867, Blakes incorporated what would become Canadian Imperial Bank of Commerce. The bank remains one of the firm's oldest clients.

In 1868, The firm was renamed Blake, Kerr and Wells. James Kirkpatrick Kerr was married to a sister of the Blakes, and would later become a Liberal senator and president of the Ontario Liberals. Rupert Mearse Wells would leave the partnership a short time after to succeed Edward as the MPP for Bruce South.

In 1871, the firm was renamed Blake, Kerr and Bethune. James Bethune also left shortly after to become the MPP for Stormont. Walter Cassels, who would in 1920 become president of the Exchequer Court (predecessor of the Federal Court) was listed as a partner by this time.

In 1873, with Bethune having left for politics, the firm became Blake Kerr & Boyd, with the addition of John Alexander Boyd, who would become in 1881 become the last Chancellor of Ontario before the court became the Chancery Division of the High Court of Justice and in 1887 the president of the entire High Court of Justice. He was knighted by Queen Victoria in 1889.

In 1878, Blakes was the first business in Canada to install a telephone system that provided a direct link to the offices of the Ontario Court of Appeal and the Supreme Court of Canada at Osgoode Hall.

In 1880, Walter Cassels became a name partner, and the firm was renamed Blake, Kerr, Boyd & Cassels

In 1881, Edward Blake ceased to be a participating partner, but continued to receive some revenue. Following his retirement as Liberal Party leader, he became a sought after counsel for high profile appeals to the Judicial Committee of the Privy Council in London. He left the firm formally when he was elected to the British House of Commons as an Irish nationalist in 1892, though the firm kept his name to this day.

In 1882, the firm was renamed Blake, Kerr, Lash & Cassels, with the addition of Zebulon Aiton Lash, who first became Deputy Minister of Justice in 1876 during Edward Blake’s tenure as Justice Minister and served in that role until this time.

In 1885, the firm became Blake, Lash, Cassels & Holman. With 15 lawyers, Blakes was among the largest corporate law firms in the young Canadian Confederation.

In 1888, the firm became Blake, Lash & Cassels. Those names remained with the firm till 1942, decades after the passing of their original namesake Edward Blake, Samuel Hume Blake, Zebulon Aiton Lash and Walter Cassels.

In 1894, Clara Brett Martin articled at Blakes. She was called to the bar in 1897, becoming the first woman lawyer in Ontario and the British Empire.

In 1953, the firm's name was changed to Blake, Cassels & Graydon.

In 1998, the firm opened an office in Beijing.

In 2003, Blakes created the Daily Bread Toronto Law Firm Challenge, which engages a number of Toronto law firms to raise money for the Daily Bread Food Bank.

In 2012, Blakes donated C$383,000 to the Fondation du Centre hospitalier de l'Université de Montréal (CHUM) and the McGill University Health Centre Foundation's (MUHC) joint corporate campaign to raise funds for university hospitals.

In 2013, Blakes assisted the 160 Girls project, an initiative promoted by non-profit organization The Equality Effect, achieve a landmark victory where Kenyan law enforcement officials were ordered to investigate and prosecute crimes of sexual violence.

In 2017, Blakes launched Nitro powered by Blakes, a program that provides access to legal services for emerging technology companies.

== Notable members and alumni ==
- Edward Blake and Samuel Hume Blake - brothers and founders
- Walter Cassels
- Peter Hogg
- Zebulon Aiton Lash
- Clara Brett Martin
