= 1917 in Ireland =

- Centuries: 18th; 19th; 20th; 21st
- Decades: 1890s; 1900s; 1910s; 1920s; 1930s
- See also: 1917 in the United Kingdom; Other events of 1917; List of years in Ireland

Events from the year 1917 in Ireland.

== Events ==
- 25 January – Armed merchantman SS Laurentic (1908) was sunk by mines off Lough Swilly; 354 were killed of 475 aboard.
- 3 February – Count George Noble Plunkett, father of Joseph Mary Plunkett, won the North Roscommon by-election on an abstentionist Sinn Féin platform.
- 7 February – The Atlantic liner SS California (1907) was sunk by Imperial German Navy U-boat U-85 38 nmi (70 km) southwest of Fastnet Rock; 41 were killed.
- 25 February – The RMS Laconia (1911) was sunk by U-50 6 nmi (11 km) northwest of Fastnet Rock; twelve were killed.
- 7 March – Prime Minister David Lloyd George announced that Britain was ready to confer self-government to the parts of Ireland that wanted it. The north-eastern part would not be "coerced".
- 12 March – In the British House of Commons, J. P. Farrell proposed that Ireland be excluded from the operation of the National Services Act.
- 17 March – Booth Line armed merchant liner SS Antony inward bound from South America was torpedoed and sunk by UC-48 19 nmi (35 km) west of Coningbeg lightship; 55 were killed.
- 20 March – A motion to reduce the salary of the British prime minister by £100 was introduced in the British House of Commons as a protest against the refusal to publish the proceedings of the 1916 Easter Rising courts martial.

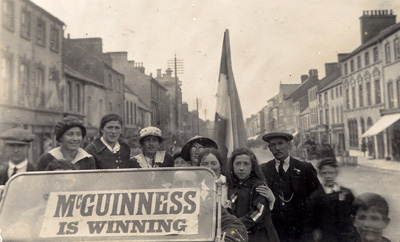
Joseph McGuinness campaign car, 1917 South Longford by-election.

- 10 May – Sinn Féin candidate Joseph McGuinness won a by-election in South Longford against the Irish Parliamentary Party's candidate McKenna. It was a political disaster for John Redmond and his Irish Parliamentary Party.
- 16 May – Prime Minister Lloyd George announced that he wanted immediate Home Rule for the 26 counties. Six north-eastern counties were to be excluded for a period of five years.
- 7–14 June – At the Battle of Messines on the Western Front, the 36th (Ulster) Division and 16th (Irish) Division both fought within IX Corps of the British Army.
- 16 June – The oiler Batoum was sunk by U-boat 6 nmi (11 km) south of Fastnet Rock.
- 18 June – Prisoners taken during the Easter Rising, now released under an amnesty, arrived at Kingstown by mailboat.
- 10 July – Éamon de Valera of the Sinn Féin party beat the Irish Parliamentary Party Home Rule candidate Patrick Lynch in the East Clare by-election caused by the death on active service of Willie Redmond. One Dublin Castle official called it "the most important election that has ever taken place, or ever will, in Irish history."
- 16 July – The Round Room of the Mansion House in Dublin was filled to capacity as the leaders of Sinn Féin demanded the bodies of the Easter Rising leaders so they could be given a Christian burial.
- 25 July – Large crowds assembled at College Green in Dublin as the Irish Convention met for the first time.
- August – W. T. Cosgrave was elected for Sinn Féin in a by-election in Kilkenny.
- 10 September – The Imperial German Navy U-boat UC-42 was sunk in Cork Harbour, probably by one of her own mines, with the loss of 26 crew.
- 2 October – Royal Navy armoured cruiser HMS Drake (1901) was torpedoed by U-79 off Rathlin Island with the loss of 18 crew, capsizing later.
- 25 October – Seventeen hundred Sinn Féin delegates attended a convention in the Mansion House where Éamon de Valera replaced Arthur Griffith as the organisation's president.
- 17 November – Action of 17 November 1917: Queenstown-based United States Navy destroyers USS Fanning and USS Nicholson captured Imperial German Navy U-boat U-58 which was scuttled off Kinsale.
- 15 December – Cargo ship SS Formby bound for Waterford from Liverpool was torpedoed and sunk in the Irish Sea by U-62 with the loss of all 35 crew. Two days later her sister, SS Coningbeg, making the same passage was sunk nearby by the same German submarine with the loss of all 15 crew.
- Undated – Scoil Bhríde in Ranelagh was founded as the first gaelscoil (Irish-language school).

== Arts and literature ==
- May – W. B. Yeats acquired the Thoor Ballylee tower house near Gort.
- August – Anglo-Welsh composer Philip Heseltine began a year's stay in Ireland.
- Austin Clarke's narrative poem, The Vengeance of Fionn, was published.
- Francis Ledwidge's poems Songs of Peace were published posthumously.
- Annie M. P. Smithson's first novel, Her Irish Heritage, was published.
- The first feature film made in Ireland, A Girl of Glenbeigh, starring Kathleen O'Connor, was made by the Film Company of Ireland.

== Sport ==
=== Association football ===
- Irish League
  Winners: Glentoran
- Irish Cup
  Winners: Glentoran 2–0 Belfast Celtic

=== Gaelic games ===
- Football
  Senior Football Championship
  Winners: Wexford
  Wexford 0–9 : 0–5 Clare
- Hurling
  Senior Hurling Championship
  Winners: Dublin
  Dublin (Collegians) 5–4 : 4–2 Tipperary (Boherlahan)

== Births ==
- 1 January – Margaret Barry, traditional singer (died 1989).
- 6 January – Maeve Brennan, short story writer and journalist (died 1993).
- 15 February – Ruairi Brugha, Fianna Fáil party teachta dála (TD), Member of the European Parliament, member of the Seanad (died 2006).
- 18 February – John Keane, Waterford hurler (died 1975).
- 3 March – Dave P. Tyndall, Jr., businessman (died 2006).
- 17 March – Brian Boydell, composer, professor of music at Trinity College Dublin (died 2000).
- 23 March – Josef Locke, born Joseph McLaughlin, tenor (died 1999).
- 27 March – Harry West, leader of the Ulster Unionist Party from 1974 to 1979, Stormont member of parliament, Minister for Agriculture (died 2004 ).
- 6 April – Jimmy Phelan, Kilkenny hurler (died 2006).
- 9 April – Vincent O'Brien, race horse trainer (died 2009).
- 14 April – Valerie Hobson, actress (died 1998).
- 29 April – Paddy Ruschitzko, Laois hurler (died 2004).
- 2 May – Con Cottrell, Cork hurler (died 1982).
- 5 May – Jimmy Murray, Roscommon Gaelic footballer and All-Ireland winning captain (died 2007).
- 25 May – Havelock Nelson, composer and pianist (died 1996).
- 17 June – Michael Moynihan, Labour Party Senator and TD (died 2001).
- 21 July – Simon Curley, cricketer (died [989).
- 15 August – Jack Lynch, taoiseach and leader of Fianna Fáil (died 1999).
- 1 October – Cahal Daly, Cardinal, Archbishop of Armagh (died 2009).
- 15 October – Kevin Boland, Fianna Fáil TD, served as Minister for Defence, Minister for Social Welfare, and Minister for Local Government (died 2001).
- 1 November – Michael O'Higgins, Fine Gael party TD and senator (died 2005).
- 3 November – Conor Cruise O'Brien, newspaper editor, author, diplomat, Labour Party TD and cabinet minister, Member of the European Parliament (died 2008).
- 11 November – Michael O'Riordan, veteran of the Spanish Civil War and founder of the Communist Party of Ireland (died 2006).
- 27 December – Jimmy McAlinden, footballer and football manager (died 1993).
- Full date unknown – Paddy Grace, Kilkenny hurler (died 1984).

== Deaths ==
- 30 January – John McDonald, soldier and congressman in America (born 1837).
- 2 April – John Phillips, member of parliament for South Longford.
- 17 April – Jane Barlow, poet and novelist (born 1857).
- 6 May – Thomas Joseph Carr, second Roman Catholic Archbishop of Melbourne, Australia (born 1839).
- 10 May – Daniel Joseph Sheehan, Royal Naval Air Service and Royal Flying Corps pilot in World War I, killed in action (born 1894).
- 9 June – Willie Redmond, nationalist politician, barrister, brother of John Redmond, killed in Battle of Messines (born 1861).
- 31 July – Francis Ledwidge, poet, killed in action during World War I (born 1887).
- 25 September – Thomas Ashe, took part in the Easter Rising, died following forcible feeding while on hunger strike (born 1885).
- 4 October – Dave Gallaher, rugby player for New Zealand, killed at the Battle of Passchendaele (born 1873).
- 6 December – James Samuel Emerson, soldier, posthumous recipient of the Victoria Cross for gallantry in 1917 on the Hindenburg Line north of La Vacquerie, France (born 1895).
- 12 December – Charles Bowen, politician in New Zealand (born 1830).
- 27 December – William John Hennessy, artist (born 1839).
