= History of Upper Canada College =

Emblem of Upper Canada College

The history of Upper Canada College (UCC), located in Toronto, Ontario, began with its founding in 1829.

== Founding ==
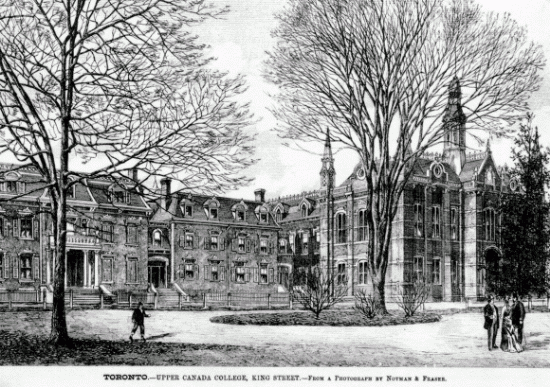
Drawing of former UCC campus at King and Simcoe Streets in downtown Toronto

Upper Canada College was founded in 1829 by the Lieutenant Governor of Upper Canada at that time, Major-General Sir John Colborne (later Lord Seaton), to serve as a feeder school to the newly established King's College (later the University of Toronto). It was modelled on the great public schools of Britain, most notably Eton. Though now a private school, the college was created with public funds including an initial land grant of 6,000 acres of crown lands, later supplemented with an additional 60,000 acres. An announcement of the college's January opening appeared in the December 17, 1829, edition of the Canada Gazette, and teaching at the college began on January 4, 1830, with 57 students; the first boy enrolled being Henry Scadding. By the end of the school's first semester, the enrolment had increased to 89. By the end of the first year of operation, UCC had admitted 140 pupils and employed a principal and eight masters.

Prior to 1829, the college was called the Royal Grammar School; its first permanent buildings stood on Russell Square, on land that is now bounded by King, Simcoe, Adelaide and John Streets in downtown Toronto. Almost immediately after the college opened, plans were implemented for newer and more permanent buildings, and the 1831 school year began in new structures at the north-west corner of King and Simcoe Streets (now 212 King Street West).

The new school was praised by some; the Reverend Thomas Radcliffe stated in an 1833 letter: "Future generations will bless the memory of Sir John Colborne, who, to the many advantages derived from the equity and wisdom of his government, has added that of a magnificent foundation [in Upper Canada College] for the purposes of literary instruction. The lowest salary of any of the professors of this institution is £30 per annum, with the accommodation of a noble brick house and the privilege of taking boarders at £50 per annum." However, the costs of the new buildings, combined with the large staff and their high salaries, led to criticism of the college and its expenses. In his publication Colonial Advocate, William Lyon Mackenzie stated: "The College here at York in Upper Canada is most extravagantly endowed... thousands of pounds are realised at will by its self-constituted managers from the sale of school lots and school lands [in fact, not true]... splendid incomes given to masters... and dwellings furnished to the professors... by the sweat of the brow of the Canadian labourer." In 1837, UCC's student militia offered help to Sir Francis Bond Head's Family Compact government in suppressing Mackenzie's pro-responsible government Upper Canada Rebellion. In 1852, Mackenzie's sons, William and George, were enrolled at UCC.

== University control ==
On March 4, 1837, the King's College charter was amended to take UCC in under the control of the university, with the principal to be appointed by the King, and the vice-principal and masters nominated by the Chancellor of King's College (the Lieutenant-Governor) at the approval of the King's College Council.

In 1838, UCC was searching for a new principal and asked the Archbishop of Canterbury William Howley for a suggestion. John McCaul was put forward. He accepted and took the post on 29 January 1839.

In 1842, Charles Dickens visited the college and said of it: "a sound education in every department of polite learning can be had, at a very moderate expense... It has pretty good endowments in the way of land, and is a valuable and useful institution."

Watercolour of UCC's dining hall by John Howard, in 1842

By 1887, despite an enrolment of 300 that was quickly outgrowing the 1831 buildings, UCC came close to closing its doors when a Liberal provincial government, which supported university federation and saw the college's endowment and downtown campus as sources of funds for such an expensive venture, came to power. That year a Notice of Motion was introduced to the Legislature by a Liberal Member named Waters: "in the opinion of this House the time has come when Upper Canada College should be abolished... as the instruction given in the College can be obtained in any well conducted high school in the province," adding that the college's real estate should go to the province. In reaction to this, a group of Old Boys met, along with letters of support from various alumni, including Lieutenant Governor John Beverley Robinson, in an effort to stop the closing of the college. The meeting ended with a unanimous motion that the group's views be laid before the government. The story was covered widely in the papers of the time, with the Evening Telegram being most supportive, the Globe taking a more moderate stance, and the News criticizing the existence of the school. In the end, after much negotiation, a decision was reached to detach the school from King's College after fifty years of affiliation, and to operate it under the guidance of five trustees appointed by the Minister of Education. The college was also to be relocated to an area outside of the city, though this provision was not included in the statute.

== Move ==
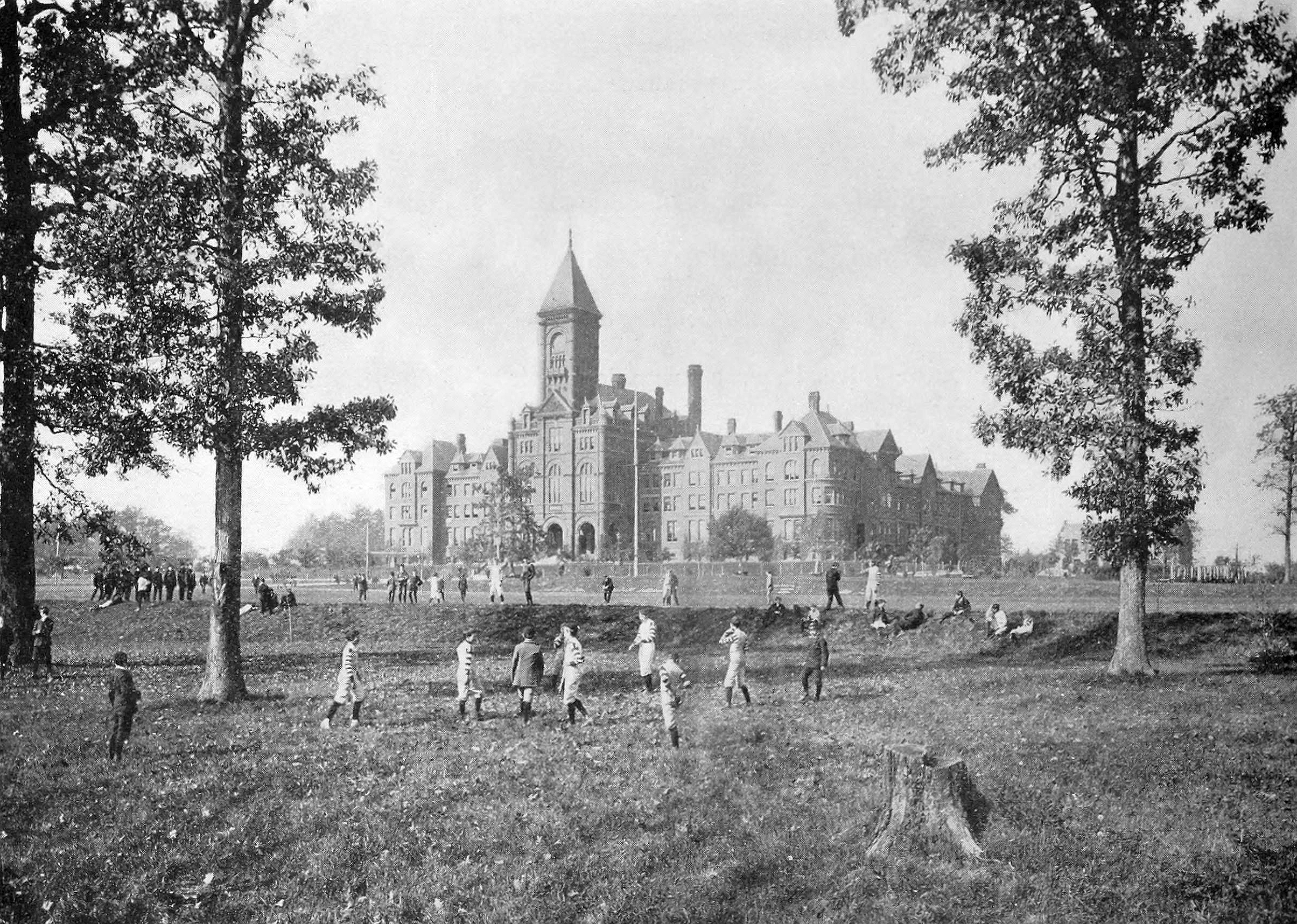
Upper Canada College buildings at Deer Park

On July 3, 1891, the bell at the Russell Square campus rang for the last time, and on August 29, a farewell cricket game was played. The Upper Canada College Old Boys' Association was created on the same day. UCC then moved to its current site, the Deer Park campus (43.6933°N 79.4042°W), 200 Lonsdale Road at Avenue Road in Forest Hill, with the doors being officially opened on October 14, 1891.

U.C.C. march for piano composed by J. Bedford Campbell is the Upper Canada College march and two-step. The music was published in Toronto; New York; Chicago by W.F. Shaw Pub. Co., circa 1896.

In 1902, a separate Preparatory School was built at the south edge of the campus, creating two physically separate schools.

== World Wars ==
More than 400 graduates perished during both the First and Second World Wars, the first being Lt. C. Gordon Mackenzie of the Royal Scots Fusiliers, on October 24, 1914. By the end of WWI, 176 Old Boys were dead.

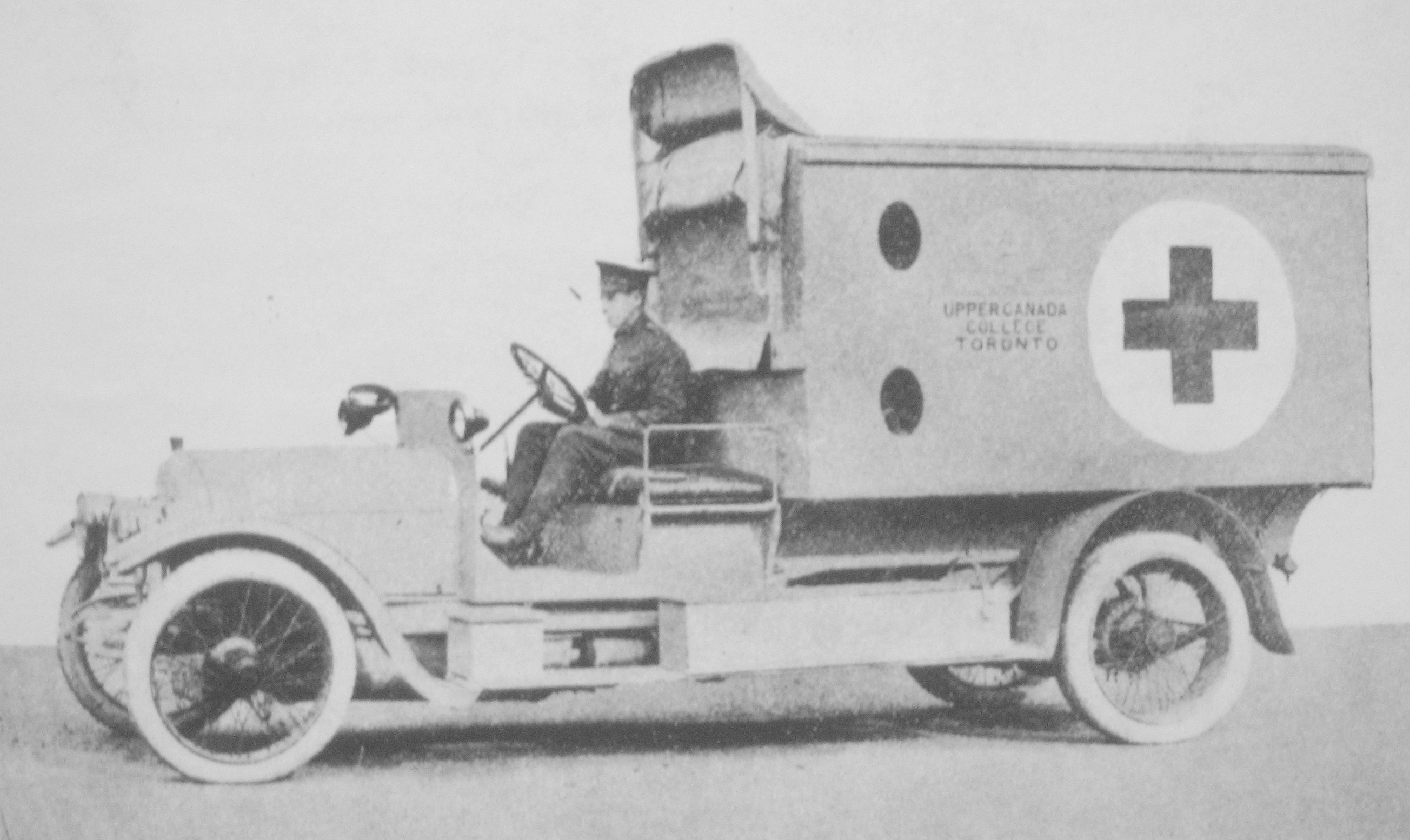
Ambulance purchased by the boys of UCC in 1916

One year later the Upper Canada College ambulance was presented to the forces, and was delivered to France at the beginning of 1916. By May the next year the vehicle had travelled almost three thousand miles, and carried five thousand wounded men.

The outbreak of the Second World War saw the college lose a number of its best masters, although the majority were too old to join and remained behind at the school. UCC welcomed a large number of war refugees; by May 1941 there were ninety seven. The increasing number led to some concern amongst the board of governors, as these students were not paying tuition. A war chest was also started for the purpose of sending packages to Old Boys, and help support the children of Old Boys killed or wounded in battle.

Historian Jack Granatstein, in his book The Generals, demonstrated that UCC graduates accounted for more than 30% of Canadian generals during the Second World War, including General Harry Crerar, general officer commanding-in-chief of the First Canadian Army, and Major-General Bruce Matthews, general officer commanding the 2nd Canadian Division and later chairman of the college's board of governors. In total, 26 Old Boys achieved brigadier rank or higher in WWII.

Prince Edward, Prince of Wales (later Edward VIII and then Duke of Windsor), was in 1920 appointed as UCC's official visitor, at the Prince's request. The College Times wrote at the time:

It will be a great pleasure to all to hear that the HRH the Prince of Wales has expressed a wish to be given the fine old English title of visitor of this school. HRH met so many 'Old Boys' while [fighting in the First World War] that, when he made his visit to Canada last year, he instituted special inquiries about the previous history of the College. Finding that the title existed, he has thus honored us by becoming 'Visitor of Upper Canada College' [...] The gracious offer of the Prince places the position on a still higher plane and it makes us all feel a lot prouder of the grand old College to which we belong.

Edward was removed from the post when he abdicated the Canadian throne in 1936.

In 1923 The War Book of Upper Canada College was published, commemorating each Old Boy who served in the "Great War" of 1914–1918. Those who gave their lives are contained in a separate section. There are also two gilt boards in the college's main foyer that commemorate the names of the dead, one for each World War.

== Vincent Massey's influence ==
During the time Sowby was principal, Vincent Massey rekindled his interest in the college and, during his time as governor general, often discussed the college's circumstances with Sowby. They worked together to bring in distinguished guests to address the students and/or inspect the college. Prime Minister Louis St. Laurent laid a cornerstone for the college's Memorial Wing and Field Marshal the Viscount Montgomery inspected the cadets, declaring them "the best cadet corps he had encountered in his career." It was also during this time that the office of visitor was revived when Prince Philip, Duke of Edinburgh, was appointed to it.

UCC's chapel was built in the early 1950s, funded by Massey and dedicated to his wife, Alice Parkin, who was the daughter of UCC principal George Parkin. Sowby had a piece of the altar cloth used at the coronation of Queen Elizabeth II donated for use in the chapel, and the dean of St. Paul's Cathedral gave marble from the ruins of the parts of the structure destroyed by bombing during WWII.

During one of Massey's visits to UCC, as Sowby was guiding the party through the main quadrangle, two ladies spotted the letters "F-U-C-K" chalked upside down on the bricks below one of the main tower windows. Massey stated "it looks like Russian to me," but after donning his glasses, realised what it said, and assured the principal that these things happened in the best of schools. The offending students, both 14-year-olds, owned up to the crime, and were ordered to write an apology to the Governor General. Massey immediately responded to them.

== Building crisis ==
The college faced a crisis at the end of the 1950s when it was discovered that the 1891 main building was decaying rapidly due to poor construction; cracks were appearing throughout, pipes split, and doors frames warped to the point where doors could no longer be opened or closed. Due to fear that the tower would collapse the building was condemned and evacuated by March 12, 1958; faculty offices were moved to the Prep building, the infirmary, and any other spare spaces, including the principal's residence, Grant House. Classes were conducted in portables.

That same year, a major fundraising campaign was launched as construction of a new building on the exact site of the old was started, with money to reconstruct the iconic tower over the main entrance donated by the media magnate, Ted Rogers. The Governor General laid the cornerstone in the summer of 1959. Prince Philip visited in the autumn to assist with the fundraising. The College Times reported: "Long before he arrived, a large crowd of boys, parents, Old Boys, and friends of the College lined the front drive,” with “Mounties in their scarlet, city policemen in their less picturesque blue, and detectives in the plainest of plain clothes" and all assembled "broke into a cheer" upon Philip's arrival. The Prince toured the newly erected buildings on campus and unveiled his recently affixed personal coat of arms in the quadrangle before being presented with a tie to signify his recognition as an honorary Old Boy.

However, the pleasure with progress was marred when a construction worker fell from the tower to his death. Nonetheless, the Viscount Montgomery dedicated the new front doors on April 28, 1960, and the new building was officially opened by Massey and Edward Peacock on September 28. The $3,200,000 cost of the building was fully subscribed.

== Late 20th century ==
Prince Philip returned again in 1969 to distribute The Duke of Edinburgh's Award Gold Awards to those UCC students who had completed the challenge.

UCC welcomed the first woman to its board of governors in 1971, with the appointment of Pauline Mills McGibbon, although she resigned in 1974 upon her appointment to the post of Lieutenant-Governor of Ontario. Five years following her departure, UCC celebrated its 150th anniversary in the presence of the college's Official Visitor, Prince Philip, at the college's first Association Day, and Sandi Ryder became the first woman elected to the college's board of governors.

1979 was UCC's sesquicentennial year, marked by a two-day visit from Prince Philip. The Duke undertook a tour of the campus—during which he reportedly wandered off, on his own, into the classroom of English teacher Mr Pearce, who was conducting a lesson on the jazz artist Miles Davis—followed by a formal reception and banquet at Exhibition Place. Attended by more than 3,000 people, the event was, at the time, the largest formal dinner ever held in Toronto. Philip commended the unique nature of a UCC education and spoke of the College as a "cooperative project". The following morning, the Prince distributed prizes to the winners of the first annual Association Run and was gifted with his own t-shirt, with HRH Prince Philip printed on it. UCC staff member Rodger Wright remarked that it would "save the Queen from having to sew a name tag on the inside of the collar." A crowd of 2,000 turned out to bid Prince Philip farewell.

By 1980 boarding for Prep students ended, with some of the dormitories being converted to computer labs where students learned the fostering technology.

In 1991, UCC was visited by the Hungarian President Árpád Göncz, who would soon after enrol his grandson at the school, and in 1993, Prince Philip again visited to officially open the Foster Hewitt Athletic Centre, the Eaton Building, as well as the rebuilt College gates, the Mara Gates, at the foot of the main avenue. Two years later the college decided to greatly alter its academic course and adopted the International Baccalaureate programme.

Prince Philip returned to the school in 1993 to aid with fundraising for the new Prep structure needed to replace the Peacock Building. Principal J. Douglas Blakey remarked in Old Times that the Duke's "popularity and appeal remain as high as ever, as we saw by the large numbers of the College family who turned out to greet him," making the visit "one of the memorable events of the fall term."

James FitzGerald, a UCC Old Boy himself, published a book in 1994 titled Old Boys; the Powerful Legacy of Upper Canada College. It stirred up some controversy in Canadian media due to its candid portrayal of life at the college, derived from excerpts of interviews that FitzGerald had conducted with former students, ranging from Conrad Black and Michael Ignatieff to unknowns who managed gas stations or worked in retail. Reactions varied; Charlotte Gray wrote in the Toronto Star: "My reaction to this book is fascinated revulsion - mainly because the school seems to have taught successive generations of boys that girls are some alien species that is both terrifying and stupid," while Jill Rigby said in the Toronto Sun: "Yeah, so what if some UCC teachers were pedophiles? All that stuff has been going on in educational institutions since Socrates met Plato."

The publication of the book had an effect on the college, both in its internal structure, as well as its relationship with the broader community. Peter Dalglish, the founder of Street Kids International, criticised the school heavily in his interview for Old Boys, where he said "A prime failing of UCC is that they have no sense of being a part of a community within the city or country. The school has to change; it is still very upper middle class." Subsequently, he was hired by the college to change school culture. Under his direction, along with Nanci Goldman, the former Toronto Board co-ordinator of inner city services, UCC students have since been partnered with inner city Toronto kids in the college's Horizon program.

The Eaton Building was extended in 1999 to accommodate the school's curricular expansion to include grades 1 and 2. Senior kindergarten was introduced in 2003.

== New millennium ==
The period of transition from the 20th to the 21st century was a turbulent time for UCC, as a series of allegations of sexual misconduct were levied against three former teachers and a former student. The first was Clark Winton Noble, who had previously taught at the College and, in 1998, admitted to engaging in sexual activity with a UCC student, off campus, in 1971. The charges against Noble were later withdrawn. UCC was then, in 2003, named in a class action lawsuit brought by 18 former students alleging sexual abuse by Doug Brown, a member of the faculty at the prep school from 1975 until 1993. Brown was found guilty of nine counts of indecent assault and, in January 2005, was sentenced to three years in jail. A settlement was reached between the victims and the college. The following year, Ashley Chivers, a UCC graduate and later teaching assistant at the College, was convicted of one count of possessing child pornography, but, not creating it; after a search of the 6,000 illegal images in Chivers' possession, Toronto police confirmed no UCC students, past or present, were evident. Lorne Cook, a teacher at UCC from 1978 to 1994, was found guilty in 2006 of two counts of sexual assault on UCC students in 1991 and 1993..

In response, UCC formed a review team to assess school policies and create new ones. This group was placed under the direction of Sydney Robins, a former Justice of the Court of Appeal for Ontario and author of Protecting Our Students: A Review to Identify and Prevent Sexual Misconduct in Ontario Schools. In early 2007, the school also mailed a letter to the entire UCC community apologizing for the sexual and physical abuse at the school and referring to the abuse of students as the most difficult issue the school has had to face in its 177 year history.

Early into the new millennium, UCC followed the trend in environmentalism when the board of governors voted to establish the Green School initiative in 2002, wherein environmental education would become "one of the four hallmarks of a UCC education." This education would include ecological literacy, environmental ethics, and contributions to broader society. which would see not only upgrades of the school's physical plant to meet environmentally sustainable standards, but also an integration of these new initiatives into the curriculum.

== Cadets ==
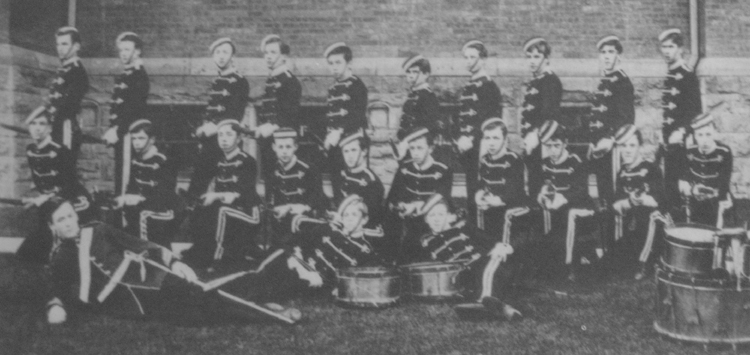
Upper Canada College Cadets, 1893

There is no definite date for the formation of the Upper Canada College Cadets, though beginnings can be traced to a willingness of students to participate in the defence against the 1837 rebellion in Upper Canada. Later in the 1800s, in schools throughout England, Canada and the United States, involvement in a military body was thought of to inspire patriotism in young men, as well as teaching discipline and obedience. By 1863, UCC students were paraded weekly, in an amateur fashion, under Major Goodwin, but with the beginning of Fenian troubles in Upper Canada in 1865, UCC students requested that the Cadets form into a company of The Queen's Own Rifles of Canada. By 1866, the request was fulfilled, making UCC possibly the second school in Canada to have a proper Cadet Corps (the first being Bishop's College School in Lennoxville, Quebec).

When the Fenians did attack Fort Erie, Ontario, on June 1, 1866 (see Fenian Raids), the UCC Cadets, along with the Bishop's College Cadets, were called to duty, but were instructed only to guard the armouries and official stores. None-the-less, this was the only time in Canadian military history where student Cadet Corps were called to duty.

By the 1890s, there was a lack of enthusiasm for the Cadets. It was an extra expense for a student's family to cover the costs of uniform, weapons, and even their drill instructor. As well, drill and practice time was beyond the commitment to scholastics and sport. Enrolment fluctuated over the next few decades, at one point the school's administration turning its eyes to the school the college had been modelled on, Eton, as well as Harrow, where Cadet participation was compulsory. No real action was taken by UCC in regards to the Cadets; however, by 1910 the population of the company had increased to 63, and in 1912 a Sergeant Carpenter was approached to act as an instructor. He was not to last long, as by 1914 he was in Europe as Sergeant-Major in the 9th Battalion of the 1st Canadian Overseas Contingent. Numbers in the UCC Cadets still stayed high during the First World War.

By around 1919, the UCC Cadets became compulsory, and principal Grant asked the army district headquarters if the Corps could be presented with Colours, both the King's Colour and College Colour. The College Colour was given by Elanor Gooderham in 1921.

During the war, the Cadets' association with the Queen's Own Rifles had lapsed, and by 1923 two regiments, the Toronto Regiment and Queen's Own Rifles were requesting that the Corps affiliate itself with them. After some dispute between the three parties, the college settled on the Queen's Own again by 1927.

For thirty following years, the Cadets remained a part of college life, and by the middle of the Second World War boys were practising not only drills, but also spent time on lectures, map reading, military law, and signalling. The biggest ceremony of the school year was the Battalion Inspection Day, when the cadet corps would assemble in their dress uniforms, consisting of navy-blue uniforms and berets, black leather boots and spats, white gloves; officers also wore a sword and Sam Browne, sergeants a red sash. The guns carried were Ross .303s.

By the 1960s belief in the cadets was faltering; religion and patriotism were not held in such high regard by youth, and rebellion was the more accepted behaviour for teenagers. Minutes of the board of governors meeting in 1965 recorded, for the first time in sixty years, poor discipline at the battalion parade. Principal Richard Sadlier disbanded the Cadet Battalion as a compulsory body in 1976, noting: "The Battalion has been left with little beyond its ceremonial drill which is a pretty irrelevant exercise to many people today and difficult to defend when it becomes the be-all and end-all of a program."

In 1977, the voluntary Royal Canadian Army Cadets helped organize a course in military science at UCC, which also included battle drill, field craft, weapons training, and some parade-square drill. But, by the mid-1980s, interest in this programme had fallen to a bare minimum, and today UCC provides no formal military training.

== Ethnic and gender issues ==
UCC began admitting ethnic minority students early in its history. The first black student enrolled in 1831 the first Jewish student in 1836 and the first aboriginal student in 1840; some graduates from the Ojibway peoples of Upper Canada having gone on to study at Dartmouth College and Harvard University.

Even though there have been ethnic minority students admitted to UCC, the school continued to maintain a reputation as a "bastion of WASP privilege" through the first 150 years of its history. In relation to this, diplomat James George, a student between 1926 and 1936, said upon reflection about his time with other UCC graduates in the Canadian Department of Foreign Affairs: "If UCC really was a womb matrix for a bunch of WASP patriots, why did it produce so many internationalists?"

Other former students took a different view, some citing experiences of anti-Semitism. Graham Fraser, The Globe and Mail's Washington Bureau Chief, who attended UCC between 1960 and 1964, recalled: "Anti-Semitism was generally an unspoken undercurrent at UCC, but a couple of times I witnessed overt anti-Semitism.... Before 1960, Toronto was a pretty narrow, close-minded, little Victorian town and Upper Canada College reflected that reality." At the same time, Peter C. Newman, who came to UCC from Czechoslovakia in 1940, and who is Jewish himself, said that anti-Semitism was "virtually non-existent" at the school.

Michael Ignatieff, who was a student at the college from 1959 to 1965 stated: "The UCC culture in my time was basically Tory, Anglican and fantastically patrician... The Canadian elite must be an open, permeable elite which is colour blind, religion blind and gender blind. There has to be an elite based not even on intelligence but character. They will mostly come from schools that bear no resemblance to Upper Canada College."

In the decades after the 1970s, some saw the ethnic composition of the school's enrollment as changing. In 1979, former Prep School Headmaster Richard Howard said in his book Upper Canada College, 1929-1979: Colborne's Legacy: "The growth of the enrolment has increased the number of boys from a wide variety of backgrounds and decreased the ratio of those from old Toronto families. The address list now reflects Toronto's ethnic variety and resembles a small United Nations." William Kilbourn also said that the college had been accepting, for many years before the 1980s, a number of foreign students, notably from Latin America and Asia, and that UCC had made a concentrated effort to recruit Quebec francophones into the student body. By the 1980s the school was offering financial assistance to the less affluent, and was making serious attempts to encourage boys from visible minorities to enroll. But, few applied, save for many Chinese, East Indian, and Japanese Canadians who were accepted into the Prep; in 1983 the numbers were 42 out of a total student population of 361. However, even into the 1990s some, while acknowledging the shift to a more multi-cultural student body, claimed anti-Semitism continued in some form. In 1990, The College Times featured an editorial stating that while UCC was no longer "a white-bread, right-wing fortress: it has become much more multi-cultural and (dare I say it?) liberal.... In my years at UCC I have faced anti-Semitism, ugliness, stupidity and bureaucracy."

By the late 1990s, the college was increasingly diverse, and in 1997 the daily recitation of the Lord's Prayer was replaced by the recitation of a prayer from different global faiths each day. In 2002, student Adam Sheikh created the Diversity Council to celebrate the cultural diversity of the school's student population. This council, a body of students independent from the school administration, organizes celebrations of Chinese, Jewish, and Ukrainian cultural events and traditions, as well as Canadian cultural events.

UCC's website states that "the College's boarding program welcomes Upper School students from all faiths and cultural backgrounds. Each year, more than 100 students from Year 1 to IB2 come together in this cross-cultural hub, where students benefit from each other's unique experiences."

Students from about 16 countries attend UCC. The international students typically come from among the wealthiest families in the countries of their origin.

The 1990 College Times also addressed alleged sexism at the school in the article The School On The Hill by Greg Tessaro, winner of the College Times' Ponton Prize for Journalism. The article stated:

"The school fosters sexist attitudes that impair the students.... There is undeniably sexism at the school. The '88 Times had a running joke in the Leaving Class section, "Why beer is better than women", with examples like "Fact #19: Beer doesn't demand equality" ...A careful look through past yearbooks reveals a sexist viewpoint that would not be tolerated at a co-ed school. The school itself is the direct cause of this sexism. ...The school teaches sexism by example. ...In addition, on a staff of over sixty full-time teachers, there are three women. However, in my time at the College, the French conversation teacher has always been a woman. The librarians are all women. The secretaries are all women."

UCC did, however, appoint the first woman to its board of governors in 1971; Pauline Mills McGibbon. The college also states:

"We value diversity and are actively engaged in building a school that reflects the various backgrounds of our community members. We recognize that embracing a mix of cultures, talents, backgrounds, experiences and socioeconomic diversity will make the College a more rewarding place in which to learn and work."

== Principals ==
- 1829–38: Rev. Joseph H. Harris
- 1839–43: Rev. John McCaul
- 1843–56: Frederick W. Barron
- 1857–61: Rev. Walter Stennett
- 1861–81: George Ralph Richardson Cockburn
- 1881–85: John Milne Buchan
- 1885–95: George Dickson
- 1895–1902: George R. Parkin
- 1902–17: Henry W. Auden
- 1917–35: William L. Grant
- 1935–42: Terence W.L. MacDermot
- 1942–48: Lorne M. McKenzie
- 1948–65: Rev. C.W. Sowby
- 1965–74: Patrick T. Johnson
- 1974–88: Richard H. Sadlier
- 1988–92: Eric Barton
- 1992–2004: J. Douglas Blakey
- 2004–2015: Dr. James Power
- 2016–present: S. James McKinney

== See also ==
- Private school
- Upper Canada
