= 1907 South Longford by-election =

UK Parliamentary by-election

The 1907 South Longford by-election was held on 6 September 1907. The by-election was held due to the resignation of the incumbent Irish Parliamentary MP, Edward Blake, following a stroke. It was won by the Irish Parliamentary candidate John Phillips, who was unopposed.
