= George Skeffington Connor =

13th Chancellor of the University of Toronto
- In office 1863
- President: John McCaul
- Preceded by: Robert Easton Burns
- Succeeded by: Joseph Curran Morrison

Personal details
- Born: 1810 Dublin, Ireland
- Died: April 29, 1863 (aged 52–53) Toronto, Canada West

George Skeffington Connor, QC (1810 – April 29, 1863) was a lawyer, judge and political figure in Canada West.

He was born in Dublin, Ireland in 1810 and graduated with a law degree from Trinity College. He came to Canada in 1832 and settled near Orillia in Upper Canada. He returned to Ireland in 1834 and was called to the bar there in 1838; he went back to Canada, was called to the bar in 1842 and set up practice with William Hume Blake and Joseph Curran Morrison in Toronto. In 1850, he was named QC. In 1848, he became professor of law at King's College (later the University of Toronto) teaching until 1853. He also served as solicitor for the university and served as chancellor in 1863. In 1857, he was elected to the Legislative Assembly in the South riding of Oxford; he was elected again in 1861. In 1863, he resigned to become puisne judge in the Court of Queen's Bench.

He died in Toronto in 1863 after an epileptic seizure.

Academic offices
Preceded by Robert Easton Burns	Chancellor of the University of Toronto; 1863	Succeeded by Joseph Curran Morrison
