= 1887 Canadian federal election =

- February 22, 1887

215 seats in the House of Commons 108 seats needed for a majority
- Turnout: 70.1% (▼0.2 pp)

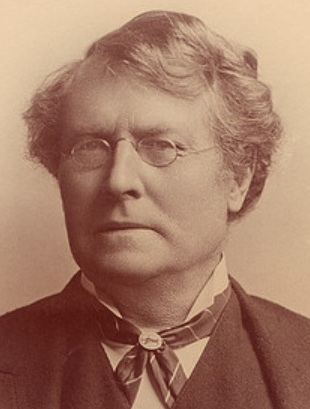
	First party	Second party
Leader	John A. Macdonald	Edward Blake
Party	Conservative	Liberal
Leader since	July 1, 1867	May 4, 1880
Leader's seat	Kingston (Note: Macdonald was also elected in Carleton; he chose to sit for Kingston instead, and resigned as the member of Parliament for Carleton.)	Durham West
Last election	133 seats, 40.4%	73 seats, 31.1%
Seats won	123	79
Seat change	▼10	▲6
Popular vote	343,805	312,736
Percentage	47.4%	43.1%
Swing	▲7.0 pp	▲12.0 pp
- 1887 Canadian electoral map

- The Canadian parliament after the 1887 election
Prime Minister before election
John A. Macdonald
Conservative
Prime Minister after election
John A. Macdonald
Conservative

The 1887 Canadian federal election was held on February 22, 1887, to elect members of the House of Commons of Canada of the 6th Parliament of Canada.

The Conservative Party of Prime Minister Sir John A. Macdonald retained power, defeating the Liberal Party of Edward Blake.

== National results ==

Party	Party leader	# of candidates	Seats			Popular vote		
Party	Party leader	# of candidates	1882	Elected	Change	#	%	Change
Conservative	John A. Macdonald	172	94	96	-7.4%	291,138	40.15%	+2.12pp
Liberal-Conservative	John A. Macdonald	32	42	27	-35.7%	52,667	7.26%	-5.30pp
Liberal	Edward Blake	183	73	79	+8.2%	312,736	43.13%	+12.03pp
Independent Liberal		9	2	6	+150%	15,695	2.16%	+1.05pp
Independent Conservative		8	1	3	+200%	11,345	1.56%	+1.39pp
Independent		10	1	1	0%	8,984	1.24%	-0.35pp
Nationalist Conservative		2	1	2	+100%	3,522	0.49%	+0.28pp
Unknown		18	-			24,172	3.33%	-22.08pp
Nationalist		6	*	1	*	4,784	0.66%	*
Total		440	213	215	-3.8%	725,043	100%	-
Sources: http://www.elections.ca -- History of Federal Ridings since 1867

Note:

* Party did not nominate candidates in the previous election.

Acclamations:

The following Members of Parliament were elected by acclamation:

- British Columbia: 1 Conservative
- Manitoba: 1 Liberal-Conservative
- Quebec: 1 Conservative, 3 Liberals

== Results by province and in the North-West Territories ==
Party name		BC	NWT	MB	ON	QC	NB	NS	PE	Total
Conservative	Seats:	4	4	2	45	23	8	10	-	96
Conservative	Popular vote (%):	62.3	65.5	32.9	43.4	35.6	39.4	41.3	39.0	40.2
Liberal-Conservative	Seats:	2		2	9	8	2	4	-	27
Liberal-Conservative	Vote (%):	22.1		17.4	5.7	9.2	6.0	10.7	7.5	7.3
Liberal	Seats:	-	-	1	37	24	5	7	5	79
Liberal	Vote (%):	15.6	34.5	44.6	46.9	41.7	40.9	41.9	41.8	43.1
Independent Liberal	Seats:			-	1	3	1		1	6
Independent Liberal	Vote (%):			5.2	0.8	3.7	3.8		11.7	2.2
Independent Conservative	Seats:	-	-		-	3		-		3
Independent Conservative	Vote (%):	18.6	12.2		0.3	5.7		0.4		1.6
Independent	Seats:				-	1	-	-		1
Independent	Vote (%):				xx	1.3	3.4	5.8		1.2
Nationalist Conservative	Seats:					2				2
Nationalist Conservative	Vote (%):					2.4				0.5
Unknown	Seats:				-	-				0
Unknown	Vote (%):				3.1	6.1	6.5	0.2		3.3
Nationalist	Seats:					1				1
Nationalist	Vote (%):					3.3				0.7
Total seats		6	4	5	92	65	16	21	6	215

== See also ==
- List of Canadian federal general elections
- List of political parties in Canada
- 6th Canadian Parliament
