= Laurence Connolly =

Laurence Connolly (1833 – 4 March 1908) was an Irish entrepreneur and politician.

Connolly was born in Louth. He worked for a time in his family's fruit merchant business in Dublin, before moving to Liverpool and setting up a similar business there. He later became a property developer.

He became active in Liverpool politics as a representative of the Irish Nationalist Party, becoming a member of Liverpool City Council. He was a personal friend of the party leader, Charles Stewart Parnell, who persuaded him to run for Parliament in South Longford, for which he was elected in 1885. In 1888, he resigned his seat, citing ill-health. There are no recorded contributions by him in the House of Commons.

He died in New Brighton in 1908.

== Endnotes ==
Parliament of the United Kingdom
New constituency	Member of Parliament for South Longford; 1885 – 1888	Succeeded by James Gubbins Fitzgerald
