= 1888 South Longford by-election =

UK Parliamentary by-election

The 1888 South Longford by-election was a parliamentary by-election held for the United Kingdom House of Commons constituency of South Longford on 30 June 1888.

The vacancy arose because of the resignation of the sitting member, Laurence Connolly of the Irish Parliamentary Party. Only one candidate was nominated, James Gubbins Fitzgerald of the Irish Parliamentary Party, who was elected unopposed.
