= Joseph Curran Morrison =

Canadian judge

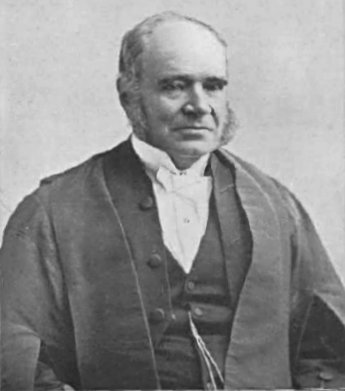

14th Chancellor of the University of Toronto
- In office 1863–1876
- President: John McCaul
- Preceded by: George Skeffington Connor
- Succeeded by: Edward Blake

Personal details
- Born: August 20, 1816 Ireland
- Died: December 6, 1885 (aged 69) Toronto, Canada West

Joseph Curran Morrison (August 20, 1816 – December 6, 1885) was a lawyer, judge and political figure in Canada West.

He was born in Ireland in 1816 and came to Upper Canada with his family in 1830. He studied at Upper Canada College, studied law, articled with Simon Ebenezer Washburn and was called to the bar in 1839. In 1848, he was elected to the Legislative Assembly for the West riding of York. He was elected to represent Niagara in an 1852 by-election after Francis Hincks was elected in both Niagara and Oxford; Morrison was reelected in 1854. He served on the Executive Council as solicitor general from 1853 to 1854. In 1856, he was named receiver general, serving until 1858. He served as director and later president for the Ontario, Simcoe and Huron railway. He prosecuted the case against Grace Marks and James McDermott in 1853 and, in 1860, prosecuted James Brown for the murder of John Sheridan Hogan. He was named a puisne judge in the Court of Common Pleas in 1862 and named to the Court of Queen's Bench the following year. He heard the case against 11 persons charged in the 1866 Fenian raids. In 1877, he became a member of the Court of Appeal for Ontario serving until 1885. Morrison was chancellor of the University of Toronto from 1863 to 1876. He died in Toronto in 1885.

His brother Angus was a member of the Canadian House of Commons and a mayor of Toronto. His daughter Mary Morrison married Arthur Sturgis Hardy, Ontario's fourth Premier.

Academic offices
Preceded by George Skeffington Connor	Chancellor of the University of Toronto; 1863–1876	Succeeded by Edward Blake
