= Tommy McCarthy (hurler) =

Irish hurler

Personal information
- Native name: Tomás Mac Cárthaigh (Irish)
- Born: 10 August 1905 Kilfinane, County Limerick, Ireland
- Died: June 1968 (aged 62) New York City, United States

Sport
- Sport: Hurling
- Position: Full-back
Clubs
- Years: Club
- Kilfinane; Fedamore
Club titles
- Limerick titles: 0
Inter-county
- Years: County
- 1927-1938: Limerick
Inter-county titles
- Munster titles: 4
- All-Irelands: 2
- NHL: 4

Thomas Patrick McCarthy (August 1905 – June 1968) was an Irish hurler who played as a centre-forward for the Limerick senior team.

McCarthy was born on 10 August 1905 in Kilfinane, County Limerick, to Thomas McCarthy and Nora Fitzgerald. His great uncle was Irish Nationalist James Gubbins Fitzgerald.

McCarthy first arrived on the inter-county scene at the age of twenty-one when he first linked up with the Limerick senior team. He made his debut in the 1927-28 Thomond Feis. McCarthy went on to play a key part for Limerick during a golden age for the team, and won two All-Ireland medals, four Munster medals and four National Hurling League medals. He was an All-Ireland runner-up on two occasions.

McCarthy represented the Munster inter-provincial team at various times during his career, winning three Railway Cup medals. At club level he won fifteen championship medals with Ahane.
