= James Gubbins Fitzgerald =

Irish politician (1850-1926)

James Gubbins Fitzgerald (1850 – 7 May 1926) was a medical practitioner and an Irish nationalist politician and Member of Parliament (MP) in the House of Commons of the United Kingdom of Great Britain and Ireland. As a member of the Irish Parliamentary Party, he represented South Longford from 1888 to 1892. He was a strong supporter of Charles Stewart Parnell.

Fitzgerald was born in 1850 in County Limerick to Maurice Fitzgerald and Maria Teresa Gubbins. He was baptised on 26 December 1850 in Kilfinane.

His grand nephew was Irish hurler Tommy McCarthy (hurler).

Fitzgerald trained at the Meath Hospital and Mercer's Hospital, Dublin. He won a prize certificate for surgery in 1872. Thereafter he moved to England where he became a member of the Royal College of Surgeons in 1876 and was an assistant surgeon at the Edmonton Infirmary. He became a Licenciate of the Apothecaries’ Hall, Dublin in 1877 and a Fellow of the Royal College of Surgeons at Edinburgh in 1884. He lived the rest of his life in South London, at Brixton, Balham, Norbury and finally from 1919 at Beddington.

He was elected unopposed to represent South Longford at a by-election on 30 June 1888, filling the vacancy created by the resignation of Laurence Connolly.

When the Irish Parliamentary Party split in December 1890 over Parnell's leadership, Fitzgerald was one of the inner circle of Parnell's supporters. He was one of the small group to be read Parnell's manifesto in reply to Gladstone on 28 November 1890 before its publication, and took part with Parnell and other Parnellite MPs in the repossession by force of the newspaper United Ireland on 11 December 1890. He was active in the by-election campaigns which took place between then and Parnell's death in October 1891. He was one of the few people to see the dead Parnell at Brighton.

Fitzgerald did not contest the general election in 1892. At the general election in 1895 he attempted to dislodge the sitting Anti-Parnellite MP, Daniel Ambrose – also a doctor – at South Louth, but was defeated by almost 2 to 1.

However, by 1897 Fitzgerald had become alienated from his Parnellite colleagues and their leader John Redmond. In a letter printed in the Freeman's Journal on 5 March 1897 he referred to 'the hollow sham of Redmondism' and wrote 'any Parnellites or Nationalists in the country who still believe that Parnellism and Redmondism are, or ever have been, one and the same thing, will now be undeceived'. In 1910 Fitzgerald was provisional chairman of the Central London branch of William O'Brien’s All-for-Ireland League, which was opposed to the reunited Irish Parliamentary Party led by John Redmond.

Fitzgerald was commissioned as a captain in the Royal Army Medical Corps at some time prior to 1921. In that year he joined the London Committee of the Irish Cancer Research Fund.

His death on 7 May 1926 at the age of 73 was apparently unmarked by any obituary.

== Sources ==
- F. S. L. Lyons, The Fall of Parnell 1890-91, London, Routledge & Kegan Paul, 1960
- The Medical Directory (annual), 1877–1926
- The Medical Register (annual), 1877–1926
- The Times, 2 July 1888, 12 December 1890, 6 July 1910, 23 November 1921, 15 June 1926
- Brian M. Walker (ed.), Parliamentary Election Results in Ireland, 1801-1922, Dublin, Royal Irish Academy, 1978

Parliament of the United Kingdom
Preceded by Laurence Connolly	Member of Parliament for South Longford; 1888 – 1892	Succeeded by Edward Blake
