= Robert Easton Burns =

Canadian lawyer, judge and Chancellor of the University of Toronto

12th Chancellor of the University of Toronto
- In office 1856–1863
- President: John McCaul
- Preceded by: William Hume Blake
- Succeeded by: George Skeffington Connor

Personal details
- Born: December 26, 1805 Niagara (Niagara-on-the-Lake), Upper Canada
- Died: January 12, 1863 (aged 57) Toronto, Canada West
- Occupation: lawyer and judge

Robert Easton Burns (December 26, 1805 – January 12, 1863) was a Canadian lawyer, judge, and Chancellor of the University of Toronto.

Born in Niagara (Niagara-on-the-Lake), Upper Canada, the son of the Reverend John and Jane Burns, Burns was educated at home and at the Niagara District Grammar School. A lawyer, he was also a puisne judge on the Court of Queen's Bench from 1850 until his death in 1863. From 1857 to 1861, he was the Chancellor of the University of Toronto. From 1849 to 1850, he was the treasurer of the Law Society of Upper Canada.

Academic offices
Preceded by William Hume Blake	Chancellor of the University of Toronto; 1856–1863	Succeeded by George Skeffington Connor
