= 1917 South Longford by-election =

UK Parliamentary by-election

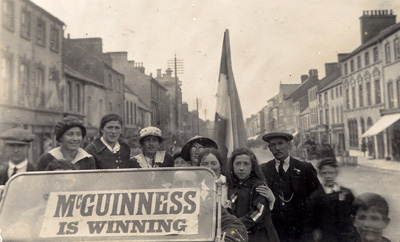
McGuinness campaign car

The 1917 South Longford by-election was held on 9 May 1917 due to the death of the incumbent Irish Parliamentary MP, John Phillips. The by-election ended in a surprise Sinn Féin victory over the Irish Parliamentary Party following a very close vote. The result was not announced until 10 May due to a recount.

Joseph McGuinness was selected against his will as Sinn Féin's candidate for the by-election. The prisoners in HM Prison Lewes, where McGuinness and other leaders of the Easter Rising were being held, were opposed to standing a candidate because the Irish Parliamentary Party looked likely to win, so McGuinness declined to stand. However, Michael Collins had him nominated anyway. His election slogan was "Put him in to get him out!".

The result of the by-election increased pressure on the British Government to free the remaining Irish prisoners in Lewes. They were eventually freed in June 1917.

By-election 9 May 1917: Longford South
Party	Candidate	Votes	%	±%
Sinn Féin	Joseph McGuinness	1,498	50.6	New
Irish Parliamentary	Patrick McKenna	1,461	49.4	N/A
Majority		37	1.2	N/A
Turnout		2,959	76.8	N/A
Sinn Féin gain from Irish Nationalist		Swing	N/A	

McGuinness subsequently sat for the Longford Constituency in the Dáil Éireann.
