= Samuel Hume Blake =

Canadian politician

- Born: 31 August 1835; Toronto, Upper Canada
- Died: 23 June 1914 (aged 78); Toronto, Ontario, Canada
- Education: Upper Canada College; University of Toronto
- Occupations: Lawyer, judge
- Children: 3
- Parent(s): William Hume Blake; Catherine Honoria Hume Blake
- Relatives: Edward Blake (brother)

Samuel Hume Blake KC (31 August 1835 – 23 June 1914) was a Canadian judge, philanthropist, and reformer from Toronto.

== Early life ==
Blake was born on 31 August 1835 in Toronto, Upper Canada. He was the second son of William Hume Blake (1809–1870), an Irish-Canadian jurist and politician, and Catherine Honoria (née Hume) Blake (1804–1886). Among his siblings was the older brother, Edward Blake, the second Premier of Ontario, and younger sister, Sophie Eliza (née Blake) Cronyn.

His maternal grandparents were Eliza and Samuel Hume and his paternal grandparents were the Rev. Dominick Edward Blake, and Ann (née Hume) Blake, a daughter of William Hume M.P. of Humewood Castle.

Blake was educated at home by tutors and entered Upper Canada College, where he studied for five years.

== Career ==
After College, Blake began a four-year apprenticeship as a clerk at the Toronto mercantile firm of Ross, Mitchell and Company, beginning around 1850. After this he decided to follow his father and elder brother Edward into the legal profession, studying at the University of Toronto, graduating in 1858. After being admitted to the Law Society of Upper Canada, he entered into a partnership with his older brother, thereafter, the firm was known as Blake & Blake (today the firm is known as Blake, Cassels & Graydon LLP). He was called to the bar in 1860 and practiced in Toronto.

In 1872, Prime Minister Sir John A. Macdonald appointed Blake junior vice-chancellor on the Ontario Court of Chancery to replace Oliver Mowat, who had resigned to succeed his brother as premier. In 1875, Blake became senior vice-chancellor, and in 1876, Mowat appointed him tavern-license commissioner for Toronto even though Blake was a lifelong advocate of temperance.

In 1881, Blake resigned from the bench and returned to the practice of law at his old firm, of which his partner, John Alexander Boyd, had just left following his appointment as Chancellor of the High Court of Justice of the Province of Ontario. While in practice, he represented the Canadian Pacific Railway, the Canadian Bank of Commerce, the City of Toronto government, and the University of Toronto.

He was also an active Anglican layman, as well as a philanthropist, social reformer, and dedicated pamphleteer. He was a member of the Evangelical Association (which later became the Church Association in 1873) in 1877 that established the Protestant Episcopal Divinity School (later renamed Wycliffe College) as a response to the "high-church teachings" of Trinity College, Toronto. He also helped to establish Bishop Ridley College in St Catharines, Ontario in 1889 and Havergal Ladies' College in Toronto in 1894.

== Personal life ==
On 3 February 1859, Blake married Rebecca Cronyn (1837–1901), the third daughter of Benjamin Cronyn, the first bishop of the Anglican Diocese of Huron. Blake's brother, Edward, was married to Rebecca's sister, Margaret Cronyn, and Blake's sister, Sophia, was married to Rebecca's brother, Verschoyle Cronyn (parents of Hume Blake Cronyn). Together, Rebecca and Samuel were the parents of one son and two daughters, including:

- Mabel Blake, who in 1889 married, and later divorced, Frank Haydn Moss, a son of former chief justice Thomas Moss. In 1908, she remarried Alexander Mackenzie of Brazilian Traction, Light & Power.
- Katherine Blake (1873–1930), who married Thomas Newbold Rhinelander (1865–1928), son of Frederic W. Rhinelander, in 1894.

His wife died in London, England while visiting her sister Margaret. After her death, the 74-year-old Blake married his 32-year-old housekeeper and private secretary, Elizabeth Baird (1876–1969) on October 18, 1909, in Rio de Janeiro.

Blake died at his home in Toronto on 23 June 1914. He was buried at St. James Cemetery in Toronto. His estate was valued at $206,819, which consisted of $50,000 in bonds in the Canada Bread Company.
