= John McCaul =

Irish theologian, second President of the University of Toronto (1807–1887)

The Reverend John McCaul

1st President of University College, Toronto
- In office 1853 – 1880
- Chancellor: William Hume Blake; Robert Easton Burns; George Skeffington Connor; Joseph Curran Morrison; Edward Blake
- Preceded by: Position established
- Succeeded by: Daniel Wilson

2nd President of the University of Toronto
- In office 1848–1853
- Chancellor: Charles Cathcart; James Bruce; Peter de Blaquière
- Preceded by: John Strachan
- Succeeded by: Position suspended (Note: The president of University College became the head of the University of Toronto when the college was established in 1853. The role of president of the university was reinstated in 1901.)

Personal details
- Born: March 7, 1807 Dublin, Ireland
- Died: April 16, 1887 (aged 80) Toronto, Ontario, Canada
- Education: Trinity College, Dublin

John McCaul (March 7, 1807 – April 16, 1887) was an Irish-born Canadian educator and theologian. He was head of the University of Toronto from 1848 to 1880, serving as the second president of the university and subsequently president of University College upon its establishment in 1853.

McCaul was born in Dublin, Ireland and earned Bachelor of Arts, Master of Arts and Doctor of Laws degrees from Trinity College, Dublin. He served as a Church of Ireland clergyman before moving to Toronto, Upper Canada in 1839 to become the principal of Upper Canada College. He resigned from the position in 1843 to serve as vice-president of King's College and professor of logic, rhetoric, and classics. In 1849, King's College was renamed as the University of Toronto, and McCaul was elected to succeed John Strachan as president. In 1853, he became the first president of University College, the founding constituent college of the University of Toronto.

== Life ==
=== Early life, education, and scholarship ===
John McCaul was born on March 7, 1807, in the City of Dublin, Ireland to a family of Scots-Irish. He attended Rev. William White's school, a private school for many of Dublin's elite. He graduated from White's School in 1820 and would continue his education at Trinity College.

McCaul would spend fifteen years at Trinity College, receiving a Master of Arts in 1828, after which he was given the job of University Examiner of Classics. He would enter the priesthood in 1831 and earn a doctorate in 1835. McCaul authored numerous books while at Trinity College focused on the classical poetry of Horace and other Roman satirist, as well as Greek tragedies.

=== Immigration to Canada and Upper Canada College ===
In May 1838, Sir George Arthur, the lieutenant governor of Upper Canada asked the archbishop of Canterbury for his assistance in recruiting a principal for Upper Canada College. The archbishop asked McCaul who agreed and left for Canada in November 1838, and arrived in Toronto on January 25, 1839.

In October 1839, McCaul married Emily Jones, the daughter of Jonas Jones, a conservative lawyer, judge and political figure in Upper Canada, quickly securing his place amongst the exclusive Family Compact.

McCaul served as principal from 1839 to 1843. He was described as modelling the schools’ approach to the Rugby School, a private boarding school located in Rugby, Warwickshire, England run by the influential educator Thomas Arnold. In 1843, McCaul left Upper Canada College to take the role of “Vice-President of the University of King's College and Professor of Classics, Logic, Rhetoric, and Belles letters.”

=== Vice president of Kings’ College ===
For a second time, McCaul's fortunes were shaped by the ambitions of a new governor general. In 1842, Sir Charles Bagot took office and worked with Rev. Strachan to immediately open King's College, which had officially been granted a charter in 1827, but had not yet formally opened its doors. McCaul had expressed his interest to Bagot for a role at the new university, who decided to appoint him vice-president and professor of classics.

However, Bishop John Strachan, the founder of King's College, initially resisted, advocating recruiting someone from England, instead of appointing the Irish McCaul, writing:

“if we are to commence King's College in an imposing, popular, and effective manner, the President and leading Professors must without exception be from England, and this I believe is now generally expected by a vast majority of the intelligent inhabitants of the Province.”

Yet, Bagot remained sufficiently impressed by McCaul's qualifications and work at Upper Canada College that he dismissed Strachan objections.

McCaul set to work in 1843 to establish a new curriculum for the college. The curriculum was classical and elitist, very much aligned with McCauls’ own experience from Trinity College. While Strachan had originally put forward a more liberal Scottish-model of education, which emphasized universal access to education, his views had become more conservative following the Rebellion of 1837.

While vice-president, McCaul was aligned with the conservative majority on the faculty who supported the original 1827 Charter for King's College, which established the college as an Anglican institution. This was controversial, given Upper Canada was becoming a more religiously plural society. In 1845, McCaul wrote a lengthy treatise defending the college's status as an Anglican college under the pseudonym “A Graduate.”

In 1848, Strachan resigned as president and McCaul was appointed his successor. However, soon after, the government led by the reformist Baldwin abolished Kings’ College and established the non-sectarian University of Toronto. Strachan immediately went to work to establish Trinity College, which remained formally tied to the Church of England. McCaul choose to remain at the new University of Toronto as president until 1853. In 1853, he became president of a constituent college of the University of Toronto, University College, until his retirement in 1880.

=== President of University College ===
Many students from Upper Canada College who would have attended King's College, were now going to Trinity College. McCaul's’ more conservative colleagues also opted to move to Trinity College. His conservatism, classicism, and formalism, made him unpopular among some of professors at the University of Toronto. For example, his eventual successor Daniel Wilson was said to hold a “holy hatred with which he regards McCaul.” John Langton, who served in the Senate of the University of Toronto wrote "Dr. McCaul is no doubt a first rate scholar and a very clever man and he has one element fitting him for command, that whether it is by bullying or by compromising or by artful countermining he never loses sight of the main object – to have his own way in the end."

McCaul as president was also required to act on some of the major social questions of the age, including the role of women and Black people in society. In 1860, McCaul was approached by a group of the students who had recently arrived from Kansas, asking him to expel Alfred Lafferty, a Black student, from the college's Literary and Athletic Society. McCaul did not. In 1863, McCaul would testify to President Lincoln's Freedman's Inquiry Commission, who were on a fact-finding mission to Toronto, praising Lafferty, saying:

“I do not hesitate to say, in regard to Mr. Lafferty, that he is equal to any white man...far superior to the average of them. It was a great subject of astonishment to some of our Kentucky friends, who came over here last year in October, when they saw this mulatto get the first prize for Greek verse which he had to recite.”

McCaul did not support the admission of women into University College. In 1869, Dr. Emily Howard Stowe, who would become the first female physician to practice in Canada, applied to take lessons at University College. The University Senate rejected her application and McCaul as president conveyed the Senate's decision to Stowe. Stowe told him that one day “these university doors will open some day to women” to which McCaul responded “Never in my day Madam!.”

During the Trent Affair of 1862, William Mulock asked John McCaul as the head of the college to call a student meeting that led to the formation of the University Company of volunteers, later K Company of the Queen's Own Rifles.

=== Society and culture ===
Outside the university, McCaul was actively involved in Toronto's and Canada's cultural scene. McCaul was a dedicated musician and was president of the Toronto Philharmonic Society from 1845 to 1847.

He was elected a member of the American Antiquarian Society in 1846.

He served as president of the Canadian Institute, which later became the Royal Canadian Institute. Additionally, he edited The Maple Leaf; or Canadian Annual, a Literary Souvenir, and contributed articles and reviews to various periodicals.

=== Family and legacy ===
McCaul retired from the University College in 1880. He died on April 16, 1886, survived by his wife Emily McCaul who died on July 1, 1896. His children were Lefroy McCaul, John McCaul, Charles McCaul, Mary Edith (McCaul) Benson, Emily Augusta (McCaul) MacDougall, Annie Margaret (McCaul) Hutton.

McCaul Street in downtown Toronto takes its name from John McCaul, as did McCaul's Pond, a pond that formerly existed near today's Hart House (University of Toronto) fed by waters of Taddle Creek.

== Scholarly works ==
John McCaul authored numerous works, mostly during his time at Trinity College. The list below is derived from the Database of Classical Scholars.

=== Classical scholarship ===
- The Metres of the Greek Tragedians Explained and Illustrated (1828)
- Remarks, Explanatory and Illustrative, on the Terentian Metres (1828)
- Dionysius Longinus on the Sublime (1829)
- Selections from Lucian (1829)
- Q. Horatii Flacci Satirae et Epistolae (1833)
- The First Book of the Histories of Thucydides (1834)
- Remarks on the Course of Classical Study Pursued in the University of Dublin (1834)
- Scansion of the Hecuba and Medea of Euripides (1836)
- The Metres of the Odes of Horace Explained (1838, new edition)
- Quinti Horatii Flacci Satirae, Epistolae, et Ars Poetica (1846)

=== Translation work ===
- Report Addressed by the Royal Society of Northern Antiquaries to Its British and American Members (trans., 1836)
- Supplement to the Antiquitates Americanae by Carl Christian Rafn (trans., 1841)

=== Educational and institutional advocacy ===
- The University Question Considered by a Graduate (1845)

=== Archaeological and epigraphical research ===
- Britanno-Roman Inscriptions (1863)
- Christian Epitaphs of the First Six Centuries (1869)
