= Peter de Blaquière =

Political figure in Upper Canada

Peter Boyle de Blaquière

10th Chancellor of the University of Toronto
- In office 1850–1852
- President: John McCaul
- Preceded by: James Bruce, 8th Earl of Elgin
- Succeeded by: William Hume Blake

Personal details
- Born: April 26, 1783 Dublin, Ireland
- Died: October 23, 1860 (aged 77)
- Parent: John Blaquiere (father)

Peter Boyle de Blaquière (April 26, 1783 – October 23, 1860) was a political figure in Upper Canada and the first formal chancellor of the University of Toronto.

== Life ==
He was born in Dublin, Ireland in 1783, the son of John Blaquiere, himself son of Jean de Blaquiere who emigrated from France. He served in the Royal Navy aboard HMS Director under Captain William Bligh, was forced off Director at the Nore with Bligh in 1797 and later fought at the Battle of Camperdown. After he retired from the Navy, he settled in Southampton, England. He emigrated to Upper Canada in 1837 and settled in the town of Woodstock.

He served as a lieutenant-colonel in the Oxford militia during the Upper Canada Rebellion. He was appointed to the Legislative Council in 1839 and, in 1841, became a member of the Legislative Council of the united Province of Canada. In 1842, he became warden for the Brock District.

In 1849, King's College, affiliated with the Church of England, became the University of Toronto, independent of the church, and, in 1850, de Blaquière became chancellor. In response, Bishop John Strachan established Trinity College as a church university in 1852; it would later join with the University of Toronto.

He resigned as chancellor in 1853 to protest changes to the university's structure. He died in Yorkville, Toronto in 1860.

Academic offices
Preceded by The Earl of Elgin as Chancellor of King's College	Chancellor of the University of Toronto; 1850–1852	Succeeded by William Hume Blake
