= Zebulon Aiton Lash =

Zebulon Aiton Lash KC
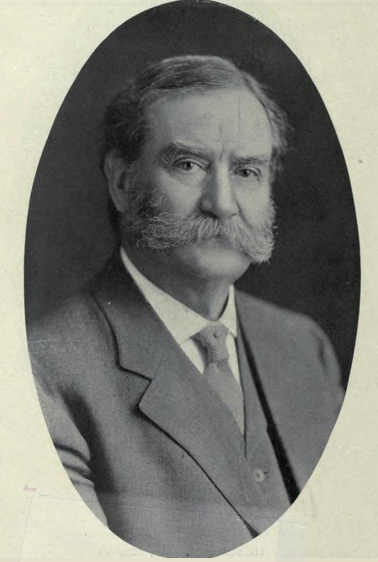
- Born: September 29, 1846; St. John's, Colony of Newfoundland
- Died: January 24, 1920 (aged 73); Toronto, Ontario, Canada
- Occupation(s): lawyer, civil servant, and businessman

Zebulon Aiton Lash, KC (September 29, 1846 – January 24, 1920) was a Canadian lawyer, civil servant, and businessman.

Born in St. John's, Newfoundland son of William Lash and Margaret Fannon, Lash was called to the Ontario bar in 1868. He practiced law in Toronto. In 1872, he became a lecturer at Osgoode Hall Law School. In 1876, he started working in the Department of Justice in Ottawa as chief clerk. From September 1, 1876, to May 22, 1882, he was Deputy Minister, succeeding Hewitt Bernard. He was created a Queen's Counsel in 1879 and was elected a bencher of the Law Society of Upper Canada in 1886.

In 1882, he joined Edward Blake's law firm in Toronto best known as Blake, Lash, Anglin, and Cassels.
