= South Longford =

UK parliamentary constituency in Ireland, 1885–1918

- Former county constituency for the House of Commons

1885–1918
- Created from: County Longford
- Replaced by: County Longford

South Longford was a parliamentary constituency in Ireland, which returned one Member of Parliament (MP) to the House of Commons of the Parliament of the United Kingdom.

Before the 1885 general election and after the dissolution of Parliament in 1918 the area was part of the County Longford constituency.

== Boundaries ==
Parliamentary constituencies in Ireland from 1885 - 1918, with South Longford highlighted.

This constituency comprised the southern part of County Longford.

1885–1918: The baronies of Moydow, Rathcline and Shrule, and those parts of the baronies of Ardagh and Longford not contained within the constituency of North Longford.

== Members of Parliament ==
Election	Member	Party
1885	Laurence Connolly	Nationalist
1888	James Gubbins Fitzgerald	Nationalist
1892	Edward Blake	Anti-Parnellite Nationalist^{1}
1907	John Phillips	Nationalist
1917	Joseph McGuinness	Sinn Féin
1918	Constituency abolished: see County Longford	

^{1}Nationalist from 1900

== Elections ==
=== Elections in the 1880s ===
General election 4 December 1885: Longford South
Party	Candidate	Votes	%	±%
Irish Parliamentary	Laurence Connolly	3,046	90.5	
Irish Conservative	James Wilson	321	9.5	
Majority		2,725	81.0	
Turnout		3,367	76.1	
Registered electors		4,426		
Irish Parliamentary win (new seat)				

General election 7 July 1886: Longford South
Party	Candidate	Votes	%	±%
Irish Parliamentary	Laurence Connolly	Unopposed		
Registered electors		4,426		
Irish Parliamentary hold				

Connolly resigns, causing a by-election.

By-election 30 June 1888: Longford South
Party	Candidate	Votes	%	±%
Irish Parliamentary	James Gubbins Fitzgerald	Unopposed		
Registered electors		4,590		
Irish Parliamentary hold				

=== Elections in the 1890s ===
General election 13 July 1892: Longford South
Party	Candidate	Votes	%	±%
Irish National Federation	Edward Blake	2,544	88.0	N/A
Liberal Unionist	George Henry Miller	347	12.0	New
Majority		2,197	76.0	N/A
Turnout		2,891	62.7	N/A
Registered electors		4,614		
Irish National Federation gain from Irish Parliamentary		Swing	N/A	

General election 19 July 1895: Longford South
Party	Candidate	Votes	%	±%
Irish National Federation	Edward Blake	Unopposed		
Registered electors		4,604		
Irish National Federation hold				

=== Elections in the 1900s ===
General election 4 October 1900: Longford South
Party	Candidate	Votes	%	±%
Irish Parliamentary	Edward Blake	Unopposed		
Registered electors		4,212		
Irish Parliamentary hold				

General election 17 January 1906: Longford South
Party	Candidate	Votes	%	±%
Irish Parliamentary	Edward Blake	Unopposed		
Registered electors		3,744		
Irish Parliamentary hold				

Blake resigns, causing a by-election.

By-election 6 September 1907: Longford South
Party	Candidate	Votes	%	±%
Irish Parliamentary	John Phillips	Unopposed		
Registered electors		3,747		
Irish Parliamentary hold				

=== Elections in the 1910s ===
General election 21 January 1910: Longford South
Party	Candidate	Votes	%	±%
Irish Parliamentary	John Phillips	Unopposed		
Registered electors		3,691		
Irish Parliamentary hold				

General election 9 December 1910: Longford South
Party	Candidate	Votes	%	±%
Irish Parliamentary	John Phillips	Unopposed		
Registered electors		3,691		
Irish Parliamentary hold				

Phillips dies, causing a by-election.

By-election 9 May 1917: Longford South
Party	Candidate	Votes	%	±%
Sinn Féin	Joseph McGuinness	1,498	50.6	New
Irish Parliamentary	Patrick McKenna	1,461	49.4	N/A
Majority		37	1.2	N/A
Turnout		2,959	76.8	N/A
Registered electors		3,852		
Sinn Féin gain from Irish Parliamentary		Swing	N/A	
