= 1872 Canadian federal election =

- July 20–October 12, 1872

200 seats in the House of Commons 101 seats needed for a majority
- Turnout: 70.3% (▼2.8 pp)

	First party	Second party
Leader	John A. Macdonald	Edward Blake (unofficial)
Party	Conservative	Liberal
Leader since	July 1, 1867
Leader's seat	Kingston	Bruce South (Note: Blake was also elected in Durham West; he chose to sit for Bruce South instead, and resigned as the Member of Parliament for Durham West.)
Last election	100 seats, 35.0%	62 seats, 22.7%
Seats won	100	94
Seat change	0	▲32
Popular vote	123,100	110,556
Percentage	38.7%	34.7%
Swing	▲3.7 pp	▲12.0 pp
- 1872 Canadian electoral map

- The Canadian parliament after the 1872 election
Prime Minister before election
John A. Macdonald
Conservative
Prime Minister after election
John A. Macdonald
Conservative

The 1872 Canadian federal election was held from July 20 to October 12, 1872, to elect members of the House of Commons of Canada of the 2nd Parliament of Canada. Prime Minister Sir John A. Macdonald's Conservative Party remained in power, as it took more seats than any other party including the Liberals. The Liberals increased their vote share and their parliamentary representation considerably, while the Conservative vote share and seat count remained mostly static. Macdonald's Conservatives received only six more seats than the Liberals. The election produced the country's first minority government. The support of two independent Conservative MPs functionally gave Macdonald an extremely slim majority that allowed it to survive for two years, until it fell due to the Pacific scandal.

Edward Blake, who had a seat in both the House of Commons of Canada and the Ontario legislature, resigned as Premier of Ontario in order to run in the 1872 federal election as dual mandates had been abolished. Had the Liberals won the election, he likely would have been offered the position of Prime Minister of Canada. The party had no formal leader as such until 1873 when Alexander Mackenzie was given the title after Blake declined due to ill health. Blake was ill during much of the 1872 campaign, and it was Mackenzie who essentially led the Liberal campaign in Ontario, though not outside the province.

The 1872 general election was the first to include the new provinces of Manitoba and British Columbia, which had both joined Canada after the Confederation of 1867. By-elections had been held in both provinces to elect Members of Parliament in the newly created ridings, with Manitoba receiving four seats and British Columbia six. (In 1870 Canada had also expanded to include the North-West Territories, encompassing the current provinces of Alberta and Saskatchewan and the Territories, but no MPs were elected there until 1887.) In 1873, PEI joined Confederation and six more seats were added to the House of Commons, filled by acclamations in by-elections.

== Electoral system ==
Most of the ridings in this election elected just one member through First past the post. The ridings of Ottawa, Victoria, the City and County of St. John, Cape Breton, Pictou, Hamilton, and Halifax elected two members, with each voter casting up to two votes (Plurality block voting).

== Results ==
=== National ===

2nd Parliament
Party	Party leader	# of candidates	Seats			Popular vote		
Party	Party leader	# of candidates	1867	Elected	Change	#	%	Change
Conservative	Sir John A. Macdonald	92	71	62	-11.3%	82,024	25.76%	+2.31pp
Liberal-Conservative^{1}	Sir John A. Macdonald	48	29	37	+24.1%	41,076	12.90%	+1.82pp
Liberal	none (unofficially, Edward Blake)	111	62	94	+53.2%	110,556	34.72%	+12.05pp
Independents		4	-	2		5,213	1.64%	+1.25pp
Independent Conservative		3	-	2		2,220	0.70%	+0.70pp
Independent Liberal		4	-	2		5,232	1.64%	+0.98pp
Conservative Labour		1	-	1		1,422	0.45%	+0.45pp
Unknown		104	-	-	-	70,704	22.20%	-11.64pp
Total		367	180	200	+11.1	320,037	100%	
Source: Parliament of Canada

Note: ^{1} Though identifying themselves as Liberal-Conservatives, these MPs and those identifying as Conservatives were both led by Sir John A. Macdonald (himself a Liberal-Conservative) and sat together in the House of Commons.

Acclamations

The following MPs were acclaimed:

- British Columbia: 3 Liberal-Conservatives
- Manitoba: 1 Liberal-Conservative
- Ontario: 3 Conservatives, 3 Liberal-Conservatives, 10 Liberals
- Quebec: 9 Conservatives, 5 Liberal-Conservatives, 5 Liberals
- New Brunswick: 6 Liberals, 1 Independent
- Nova Scotia: 1 Conservative, 4 Liberal-Conservatives, 2 Liberals

=== Results by province ===
Party name		BC	Manitoba	Ontario	Quebec	NB	NS	Total
Conservative	Seats	1	1	26	25	2	7	62
Conservative	Popular vote	4.5	29.7	25.9	31.5	8.4	23.5	25.8
Liberal-Conservative	Seats	3	1	12	12	3	6	37
Liberal-Conservative	Vote			11.9	10.5	17.8	19.8	12.9
Liberal	Seats	2	1	48	26	9	8	94
Liberal	Vote	83.7	35.6	35.3	32.6	46.8	28.1	34.7
Conservative Labour	Seats			1				1
Conservative Labour	Vote			0.9				0.4
Unknown	Seats	-	-	-	-	-	-	-
Unknown	Vote	11.8	14.9	23.4	21.5	26.9	16.4	22.2
Independent	Seats			-	1	1	-	2
Independent	Vote			0.8	1.7		6.1	1.6
Independent Liberal	Seats			1		1		2
Independent Liberal	Vote			1.7			6.1	1.6
Independent Conservative	Seats		1		1			2
Independent Conservative	Vote		19.8		2.2			0.7
Total seats		6	4	88	65	16	21	200

== See also ==
- List of Canadian federal general elections
