= John Phillips (Irish politician) =

Irish politician, died 1917

- Born: 1839 or 1840; County Longford, Ireland
- Died: 2 April 1917 (aged 77); Edgeworthstown, County Longford, Ireland
- Occupation: Politician

John Phillips (1839 or 1840 – 2 April 1917) was an Irish politician who served as the Nationalist Member of Parliament for South Longford.

Phillips was born in County Longford, and worked as a farmer there. In his youth, he played a prominent role in the Fenian movement in Longford, but later devoted his energies to the constitutional Home Rule movement. He was co-opted to Longford County Council on its establishment in 1899, and was its chairman from 1902 until his death. He was elected as MP for South Longford in 1907.

Following a prolonged illness, John Phillips died at his residence in Edgeworthstown on 2 April 1917 at the age of 77.

Parliament of the United Kingdom
Preceded by Edward Blake	Member of Parliament for South Longford; 1907–1917	Succeeded by Joseph McGuinness
