= Joseph McGuinness =

Irish politician (1875–1922)

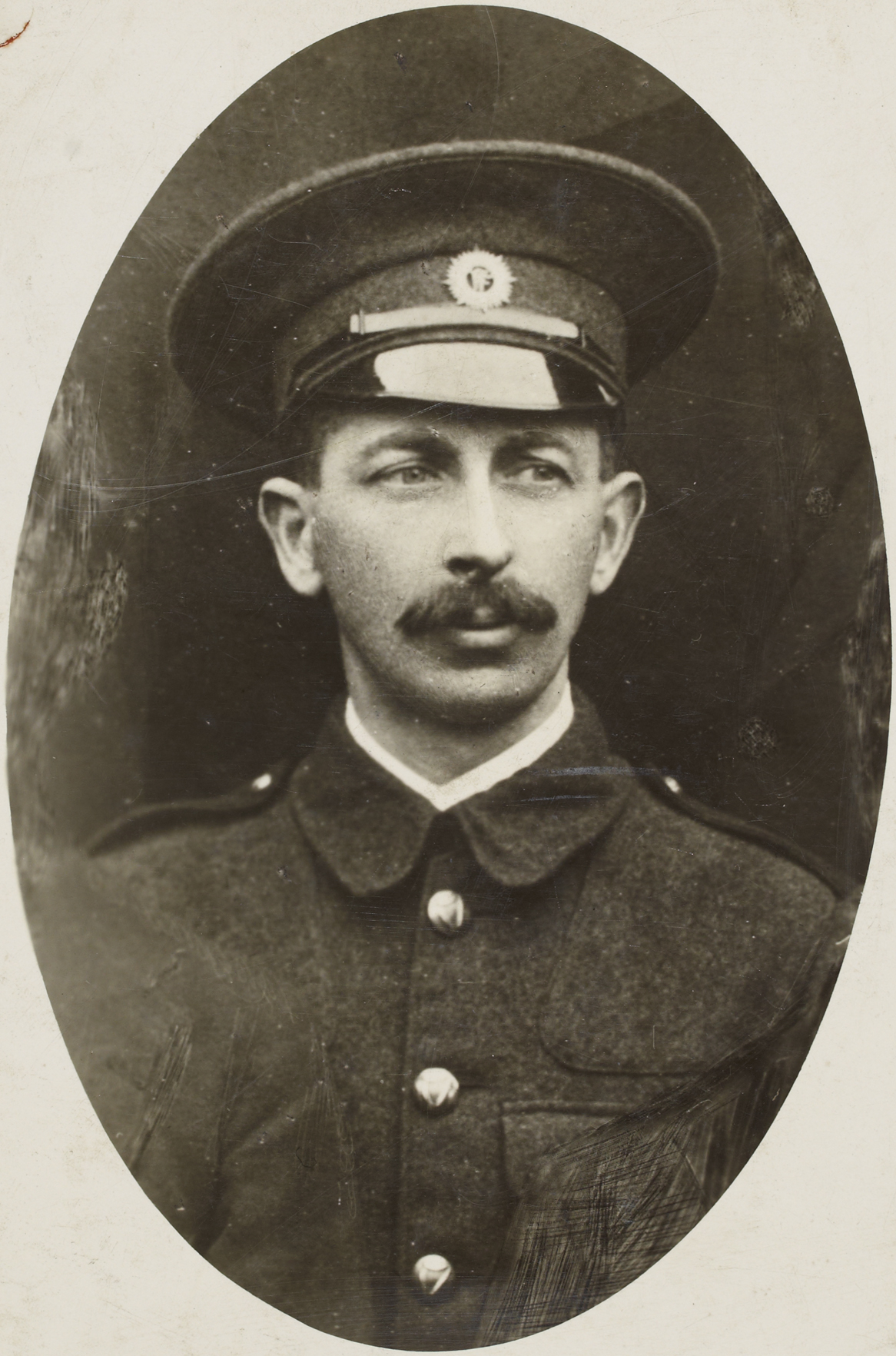
- McGuinness, c. 1915

Teachta Dála
- In office May 1921 – 31 May 1922
- Constituency: Longford–Westmeath
- In office December 1918 – May 1921
- Constituency: County Longford

Member of Parliament
- In office 9 May 1917 – December 1918
- Preceded by: John Phillips
- Constituency: Longford South
- Succeeded by: Constituency abolished

Personal details
- Born: 12 April 1875 Tarmonbarry, County Roscommon, Ireland
- Died: 31 May 1922 (aged 47) County Roscommon, Ireland
- Party: Sinn Féin
- Spouse: Katherine Farrell

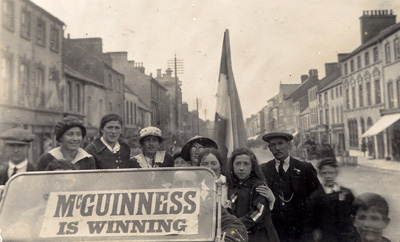
McGuinness campaign car in Main St Longford, 1917. Centre, with white trim around her hat, is Joseph McGuinness' wife, née Katherine Farrell. With her are three of their nieces.

Joseph P. McGuinness (12 April 1875 – 31 May 1922) was an Irish Sinn Féin politician and Member of Parliament (MP) from 1917 until his death in 1922. He is known for winning the 1917 South Longford by-election while serving a prison sentence for his role in the Easter Rising. Michael Collins worked on his by-election campaign.

== Early life ==
McGuinness was born on 12 April 1875 in Cloonmore townland, Tarmonbarry, County Roscommon, to Martin McGuinness, farmer, and Rose Farrell.

After a period in the United States, he lived in Longford town after his return from the US in 1902. He became involved in the local branch of Conradh na Gaeilge. He subsequently moved to Dublin, where he ran drapery shops. He also joined the Irish Volunteers, serving as a lieutenant in "C" company, 1st battalion, which was commanded by Ned Daly. His wife, Katherine Farrell, was a member of the central branch of Cumann na mBan.

== Political career ==
McGuinness, as a member of the Irish Volunteers, took part in fighting in the Four Courts during the Easter Rising in 1916. According to some reports, he was second-in-command in the Four Courts. After the defeat of the uprising, McGuinness was sentenced to ten years' penal servitude (later reduced to three), and was transferred to HM Prison Lewes with other fighters.

While in prison, McGuinness was selected against his will as Sinn Féin candidate for the Longford South by-election in May 1917. The prisoners in Lewes were opposed to standing a candidate when the Irish Parliamentary Party looked likely to win, so McGuinness declined to stand. However, Collins had him nominated anyway, and McGuinness went on to win by 37 votes after a recount. His election slogan was "Put him in to get him out!"

He was re-elected as MP for the new County Longford constituency at the 1918 general election. In common with the other Sinn Féin MPs, he did not take his seat in the British House of Commons, sitting instead as a TD in the revolutionary First Dáil, where he was appointed as substitute Director of Trade and Commerce on 27 October 1919.

On 3 May 1922 McGuiness was appointed to the so-called "Committee of Ten" established by the Dáil in an effort to stave off the looming civil war. The committee met eleven times but could only report on failure to the Dáil on 11 May.

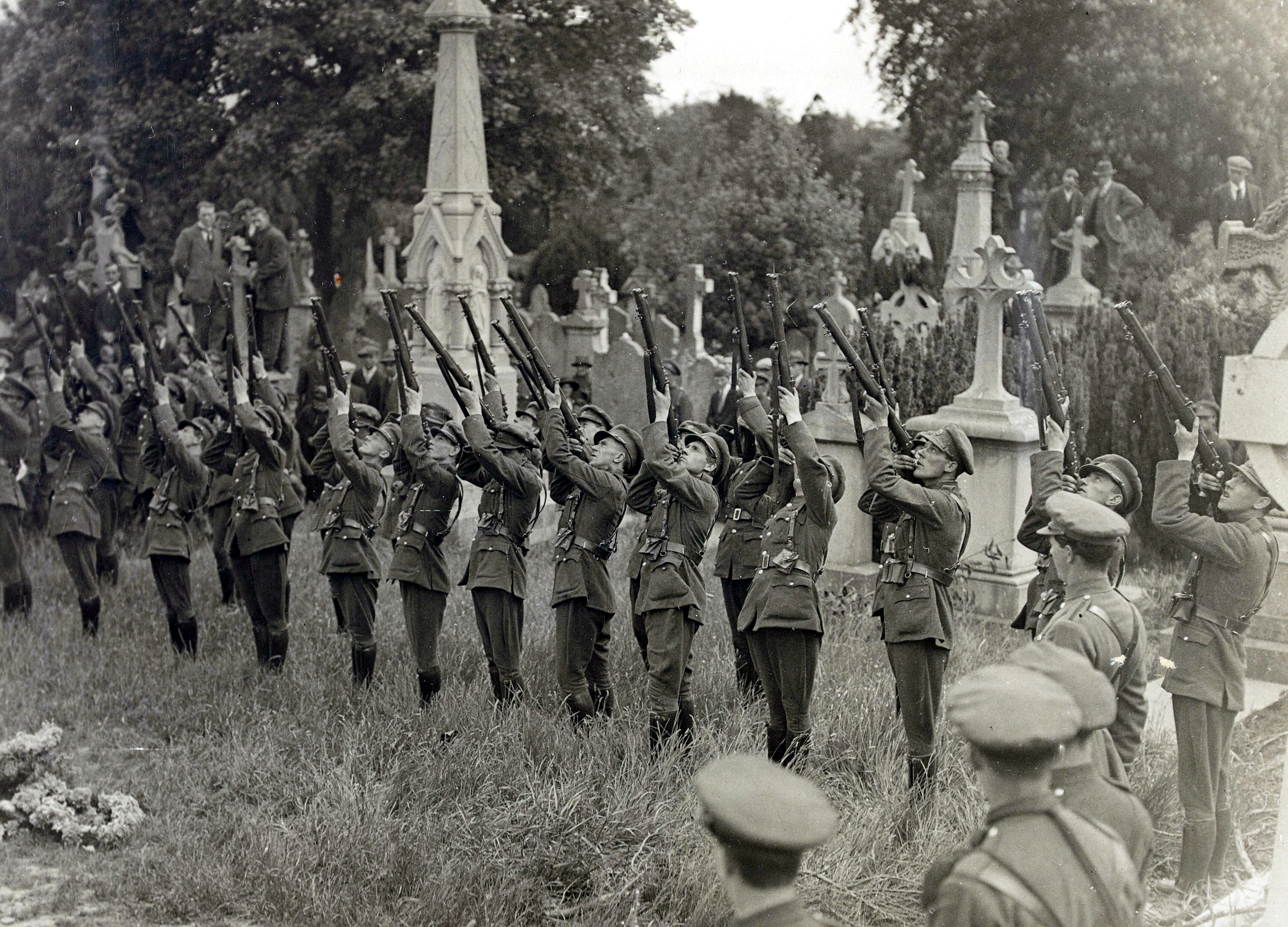
Firing party at McGuinness's funeral in Glasnevin Cemetery.

He was re-elected unopposed at the 1921 general election in the new Longford–Westmeath constituency. He voted in favour of the Anglo-Irish Treaty in January 1922. He died on 31 May 1922. At the 1922 general election, his brother Francis McGuinness was elected for Longford–Westmeath.

Parliament of the United Kingdom
| Preceded by John Phillips | Member of Parliament for South Longford; 1917–1918 | Constituency abolished |
| New constituency | Member of Parliament for County Longford; 1918–1922 | Constituency abolished |
Oireachtas
| New constituency | Teachta Dála for County Longford; 1918–1921 | Constituency abolished |

| Dáil | Election | Deputy (Party) | Deputy (Party) | Deputy (Party) | Deputy (Party) | Deputy (Party) |
|---|---|---|---|---|---|---|
| 2nd | 1921 | Lorcan Robbins (SF) | Seán Mac Eoin (SF) | Joseph McGuinness (SF) | Laurence Ginnell (SF) | 4 seats 1921–1923 |
| 3rd | 1922 | John Lyons (Lab) | Seán Mac Eoin (PT-SF) | Francis McGuinness (PT-SF) | Laurence Ginnell (AT-SF) | 4 seats 1921–1923 |
| 4th | 1923 | John Lyons (Ind.) | Conor Byrne (Rep) | James Killane (Rep) | Patrick Shaw (CnaG) | Patrick McKenna (FP) |
| 5th | 1927 (Jun) | Henry Broderick (Lab) | Michael Kennedy (FF) | James Victory (FF) | Patrick Shaw (CnaG) | Hugh Garahan (FP) |
| 6th | 1927 (Sep) | Henry Broderick (Lab) | Michael Kennedy (FF) | James Killane (FF) | Patrick Shaw (CnaG) | Michael Connolly (CnaG) |
| 6th | 1930 by-election | Henry Broderick (Lab) | Michael Kennedy (FF) | James Geoghegan (FF) | Patrick Shaw (CnaG) | Michael Connolly (CnaG) |
| 7th | 1932 | Francis Gormley (FF) | Michael Kennedy (FF) | James Geoghegan (FF) | Patrick Shaw (CnaG) | Seán Mac Eoin (CnaG) |
| 8th | 1933 | James Victory (FF) | Michael Kennedy (FF) | James Geoghegan (FF) | Charles Fagan (NCP) | Seán Mac Eoin (CnaG) |
| 9th | 1937 | Constituency abolished. See Athlone–Longford and Meath–Westmeath | | | | |

| Dáil | Election | Deputy (Party) | Deputy (Party) | Deputy (Party) | Deputy (Party) | Deputy (Party) |
|---|---|---|---|---|---|---|
| 13th | 1948 | Erskine H. Childers (FF) | Thomas Carter (FF) | Michael Kennedy (FF) | Seán Mac Eoin (FG) | Charles Fagan (Ind.) |
| 14th | 1951 | Erskine H. Childers (FF) | Frank Carter (FF) | Michael Kennedy (FF) | Seán Mac Eoin (FG) | Charles Fagan (Ind.) |
| 15th | 1954 | Erskine H. Childers (FF) | Frank Carter (FF) | Michael Kennedy (FF) | Seán Mac Eoin (FG) | Charles Fagan (FG) |
| 16th | 1957 | Erskine H. Childers (FF) | Ruairí Ó Brádaigh (SF) | Michael Kennedy (FF) | Seán Mac Eoin (FG) | Charles Fagan (FG) |
| 17th | 1961 | Frank Carter (FF) | Joe Sheridan (Ind.) | Michael Kennedy (FF) | Seán Mac Eoin (FG) | 4 seats 1961–1992 |
| 18th | 1965 | Frank Carter (FF) | Joe Sheridan (Ind.) | Patrick Lenihan (FF) | Gerry L'Estrange (FG) | 4 seats 1961–1992 |
| 19th | 1969 | Frank Carter (FF) | Joe Sheridan (Ind.) | Patrick Lenihan (FF) | Gerry L'Estrange (FG) | 4 seats 1961–1992 |
| 19th | 1970 by-election | Frank Carter (FF) | Joe Sheridan (Ind.) | Patrick Cooney (FG) | Gerry L'Estrange (FG) | 4 seats 1961–1992 |
| 20th | 1973 | Frank Carter (FF) | Joe Sheridan (Ind.) | Patrick Cooney (FG) | Gerry L'Estrange (FG) | 4 seats 1961–1992 |
| 21st | 1977 | Albert Reynolds (FF) | Joe Sheridan (Ind.) | Seán Keegan (FF) | Gerry L'Estrange (FG) | 4 seats 1961–1992 |
| 22nd | 1981 | Albert Reynolds (FF) | Patrick Cooney (FG) | Seán Keegan (FF) | Gerry L'Estrange (FG) | 4 seats 1961–1992 |
| 23rd | 1982 (Feb) | Albert Reynolds (FF) | Patrick Cooney (FG) | Seán Keegan (FF) | Gerry L'Estrange (FG) | 4 seats 1961–1992 |
| 24th | 1982 (Nov) | Albert Reynolds (FF) | Patrick Cooney (FG) | Mary O'Rourke (FF) | Gerry L'Estrange (FG) | 4 seats 1961–1992 |
| 25th | 1987 | Albert Reynolds (FF) | Patrick Cooney (FG) | Mary O'Rourke (FF) | Henry Abbott (FF) | 4 seats 1961–1992 |
| 26th | 1989 | Albert Reynolds (FF) | Louis Belton (FG) | Mary O'Rourke (FF) | Paul McGrath (FG) | 4 seats 1961–1992 |
| 27th | 1992 | Constituency abolished. See Longford–Roscommon and Westmeath | | | | |

| Dáil | Election | Deputy (Party) | Deputy (Party) | Deputy (Party) | Deputy (Party) | Deputy (Party) |
|---|---|---|---|---|---|---|
| 30th | 2007 | Willie Penrose (Lab) | Peter Kelly (FF) | Mary O'Rourke (FF) | James Bannon (FG) | 4 seats 2007–2024 |
| 31st | 2011 | Willie Penrose (Lab) | Robert Troy (FF) | Nicky McFadden (FG) | James Bannon (FG) | 4 seats 2007–2024 |
| 31st | 2014 by-election | Willie Penrose (Lab) | Robert Troy (FF) | Gabrielle McFadden (FG) | James Bannon (FG) | 4 seats 2007–2024 |
| 32nd | 2016 | Willie Penrose (Lab) | Robert Troy (FF) | Kevin "Boxer" Moran (Ind.) | Peter Burke (FG) | 4 seats 2007–2024 |
| 33rd | 2020 | Sorca Clarke (SF) | Robert Troy (FF) | Joe Flaherty (FF) | Peter Burke (FG) | 4 seats 2007–2024 |
| 34th | 2024 | Sorca Clarke (SF) | Robert Troy (FF) | Kevin "Boxer" Moran (Ind.) | Peter Burke (FG) | Micheál Carrigy (FG) |
