= Simon Curley =

Irish cricketer (1917–1989)

Cricket information
- Batting: Left-handed

International information
- National side: Ireland

Career statistics
Competition	First-class
Matches	5
Runs scored	175
Batting average	19.44
100s/50s	0/0
Top score	43
Catches/stumpings	6/–
- Source: CricketArchive, 10 October 2022

Simon Andrew Curley (21 July 1917 – 11 March 1989) was an Irish cricketer. A left-handed batsman he made his debut for the Ireland cricket team against Yorkshire in June 1948 and went on to play for them on eight occasions, his last game against South Africa in July 1951.

Of his matches for Ireland, five had first-class status. He scored 208 runs at an average of 14.86, with a top score of 43 against Scotland in July 1948.
