= McCaul Loop =

Streetcar line terminus in Toronto, Canada

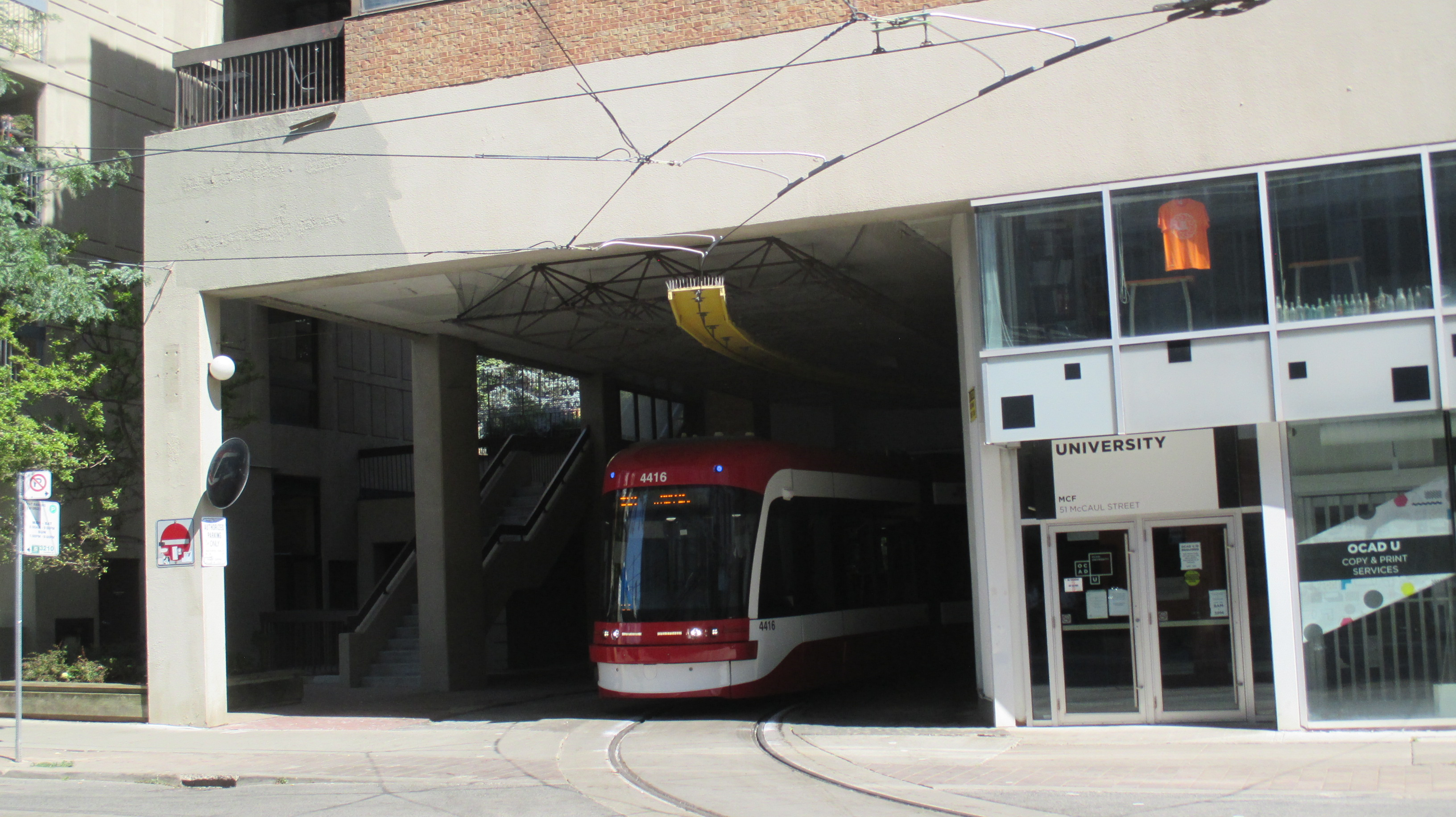
- Streetcar on diversion waiting to depart McCaul Loop

General information
- Location: 49 McCaul Street, Toronto, Ontario; Canada
- Coordinates: 43°39′06″N 79°23′25″W
- Owner: Toronto Transit Commission

History
- Opened: 1928; 98 years ago
- Rebuilt: 1976; 50 years ago
Location

McCaul Loop is a turning loop and was the western terminus of the 502 Downtowner until its abolition in 2020. It is located on the east side of McCaul Street north of Queen Street West at the Village by the Grange mixed-use development, across the street from OCAD University.

Streetcars can only enter northbound from Queen Street and exit one way to return southbound. Passengers cannot access vehicles within the loop and must use a stop outside at Stephanie Street.

== History ==
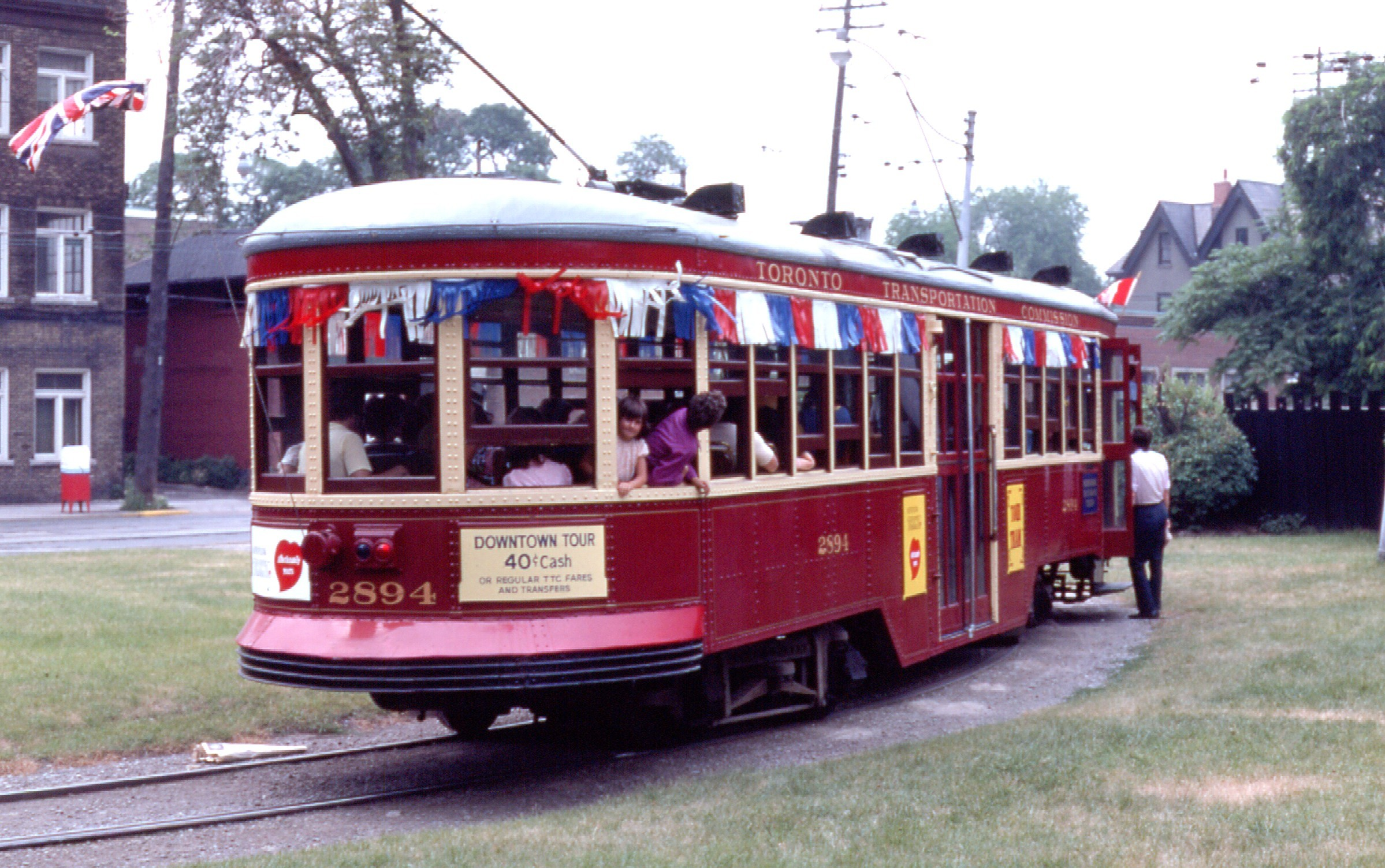
Vintage Peter Witt streetcar on 1975 excursion

In 1928, to relieve the congestion of streetcar operations along Queen Street, the McCaul Loop was constructed on the west side of downtown Toronto, and another on Mutual Street to the east.

The Village by the Grange shopping and residential complex was built in 1976 around and on top of the loop which was now enclosed. Two Peter Witt streetcars were placed within the loop to serve as a theme restaurant, which did not succeed and went out of business. The space is now shared with OCAD University.

Tracks on McCaul Street, including the loop, were reconstructed in 2012.

== Services ==
Until September 2018, McCaul Loop was the western terminus for 502 Downtowner streetcars coming from Bingham Loop. It continues to be used to short turn streetcar service in both directions on the 501 Queen route.

McCaul Street is not used for any other revenue service, but the connecting tracks between Queen Street, Dundas Street and College Street enables 505 Dundas and 506 Carlton streetcars to short turn and briefly layover on the street, without entering the loop.
