= William Hume Blake =

Irish-Canadian jurist and politician

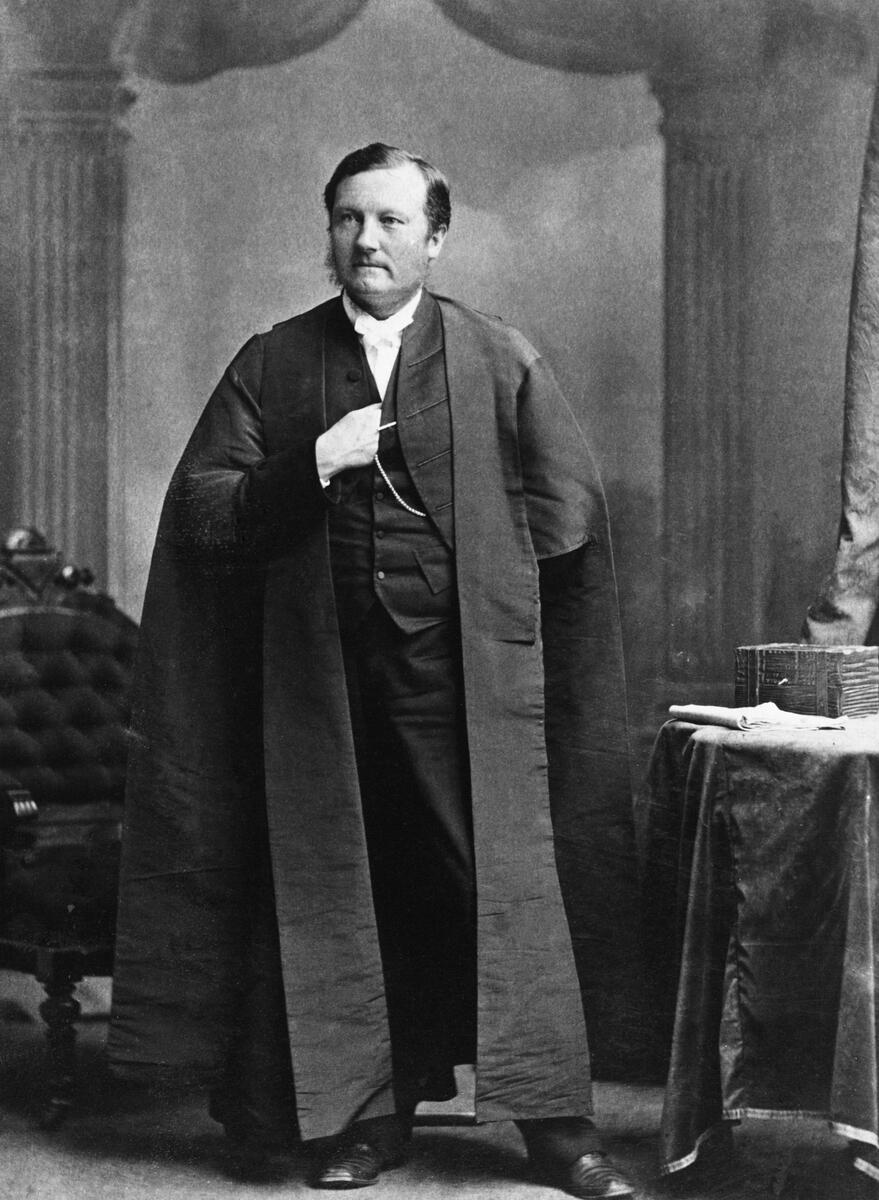

11th Chancellor of the University of Toronto
- In office 1852–1856
- President: John McCaul
- Preceded by: Peter de Blaquière
- Succeeded by: Robert Easton Burns

Member of the Legislative Assembly of the Province of Canada for East York
- In office 1849–1850

Personal details
- Born: 10 March 1809 Humewood Castle, Kiltegan, County Wicklow, Ireland
- Died: 15 November 1870 (aged 61) Toronto, Ontario, Canada
- Party: Reform
- Spouse: Catherine Honoria Hume
- Relations: Edward Blake, Samuel Hume Blake (sons)
- Education: Trinity College Dublin
- Occupation: lawyer, judge

William Hume Blake QC (10 March 1809 – 15 November 1870) was an Irish-Canadian jurist and politician. He was the father of Edward Blake, an Ontario Premier and federal Liberal party of Canada leader, and the first Chancellor of Upper Canada.

He was born at his grandfather's home, Humewood Castle, Kiltegan, County Wicklow, Ireland, the son of the Rev. Dominick Edward Blake, and Ann, daughter of William Hume (1747–1798) MP, of Humewood Castle. His ancestors were counted among the Tribes of Galway. He was educated at Trinity College Dublin. In 1832 he emigrated to Canada and settled on a farm in Middlesex County, specifically Adelaide. In a few years (fall of 1834) he removed to Toronto, studied law, and was called to the bar in 1838. He soon distinguished himself in the profession, but was strongly interested in the political issues which agitated the province. In 1848 he was elected to the Legislature for East York (now Ontario County) and in the same year was appointed Solicitor-General for Upper Canada in the Lafontaine-Baldwin ministry. In 1849 he prepared the act reforming the practice and organization of the Court of Chancery in Upper Canada and resigned from the ministry in order to become in 1849 the first chancellor of the court. In March, 1862, he resigned on account of failing health, and eight years later he died in Toronto. He was named a Queen's Counsel in 1848.

== Family ==
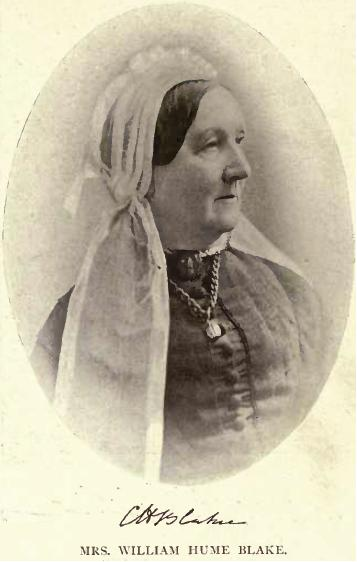
Mrs Catherine Honoria Blake wife of William Hume Blake

William Hume Blake, Esquire, married Catherine Honoria Hume (born in 1804), daughter of Joseph Samuel Hume, and Eliza, in 1832. The couple emigrated to Canada in 1832. Her death on 3 February 1886, resulted from an accident. She served on the Committee of Management of the Toronto General Hospital and of the Female Emigrant Society and other similar bodies.

The couple were the parents of the Hon. Edward Blake, an Ontario Premier and federal Liberal party of Canada leader and of the Hon. Samuel Hume Blake, K.C., a member of the Ontario Bar.

== Notes ==
Academic offices
Preceded by Peter Boyle de Blaquière	Chancellor of the University of Toronto; 1852–1856	Succeeded by Robert Easton Burns
