= Edward Blake =

Canadian politician (1833–1912)

The Honourable Edward Blake PC KC
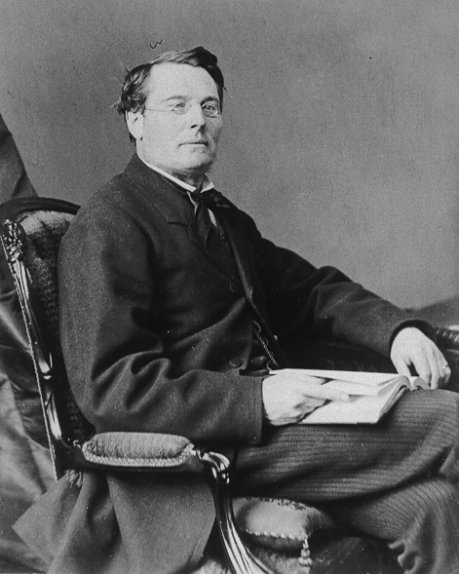
- Blake in the 1870s

Member of Parliament (United Kingdom) for South Longford
- In office July 1892 – August 1907
- Preceded by: James Gubbins Fitzgerald
- Succeeded by: John Phillips

15th Chancellor of the University of Toronto
- In office 1876–1900
- President: John McCaul; Daniel Wilson; James Loudon
- Preceded by: Joseph Curran Morrison
- Succeeded by: William Ralph Meredith

Leader of the Opposition
- In office May 4, 1880 – June 2, 1887
- Preceded by: Alexander Mackenzie
- Succeeded by: Wilfrid Laurier

2nd Premier of Ontario
- In office December 20, 1871 – October 25, 1872
- Monarch: Victoria
- Lieutenant Governor: William Pearce Howland
- Preceded by: John Sandfield Macdonald
- Succeeded by: Oliver Mowat

Personal details
- Born: Dominick Edward Blake; October 13, 1833 Adelaide Township, Upper Canada
- Died: March 1, 1912 (aged 78) Toronto, Ontario, Canada
- Resting place: Saint James Cemetery, Toronto
- Party: Ontario Liberal Party; Liberal Party of Canada
- Other political affiliations: Irish National Federation (1892-1900); Irish Parliamentary Party (1900-1907)
- Spouse: Margaret Cronyn
- Relations: Samuel Hume Blake, brother; William Hume Blake, father; Benjamin Cronyn, father-in-law; George MacKinnon Wrong, son-in-law; H. H. Wrong, grandson

Dominick Edward Blake PC KC (October 13, 1833 – March 1, 1912), known as Edward Blake, was the second premier of Ontario, from 1871 to 1872 and leader of the Liberal Party of Canada from 1880 to 1887. He is one of three federal permanent Liberal leaders never to become Prime Minister of Canada, the others being Stéphane Dion and the latter's immediate successor Michael Ignatieff. He may be said to have served in the national politics of what developed as the affairs of three nationalities: Canadian, British, and Irish. Blake was also the founder, in 1856, of the Canadian law firm now known as Blake, Cassels & Graydon LLP.

After retiring from Canadian politics, Blake served four terms as an MP in the United Kingdom Parliament representating the Irish National Federation and then the Irish Parliamentary Party.

== Early years ==
Blake was born in 1833, in Adelaide Township, Middlesex County, Upper Canada, the son of William Hume Blake and Catherine Honoria Hume, and was educated at Upper Canada College.

In 1856, after Blake was called to the bar, he entered into partnership with Stephen M. Jarvis in Toronto to practice law. When his brother Samuel Hume Blake joined soon thereafter, the firm became Blake & Blake. Today it is known as Blake, Cassels & Graydon.

As a consequence of the ruling of the Judicial Committee of the Privy Council in Long v The Bishop of Cape Town, Blake offered a legal opinion to Benjamin Cronyn (then Bishop of the Anglican Diocese of Huron) on the legality of the convening of a Provincial Synod of the various Dioceses of the Ecclesiastical Province of Canada by Francis Fulford (then Bishop of Montreal and Metropolitan of Canada). He determined that the concurrence of all of the Dioceses of the Ecclesiastical Province would be required prior to the creation of the Provincial Synod, and therefore no such Synod could legally be convened until the entity first existed. This opinion was read into the Minutes of the seventh session of the Synod of the Diocese of Huron which convened in June 1864.

== Political career ==
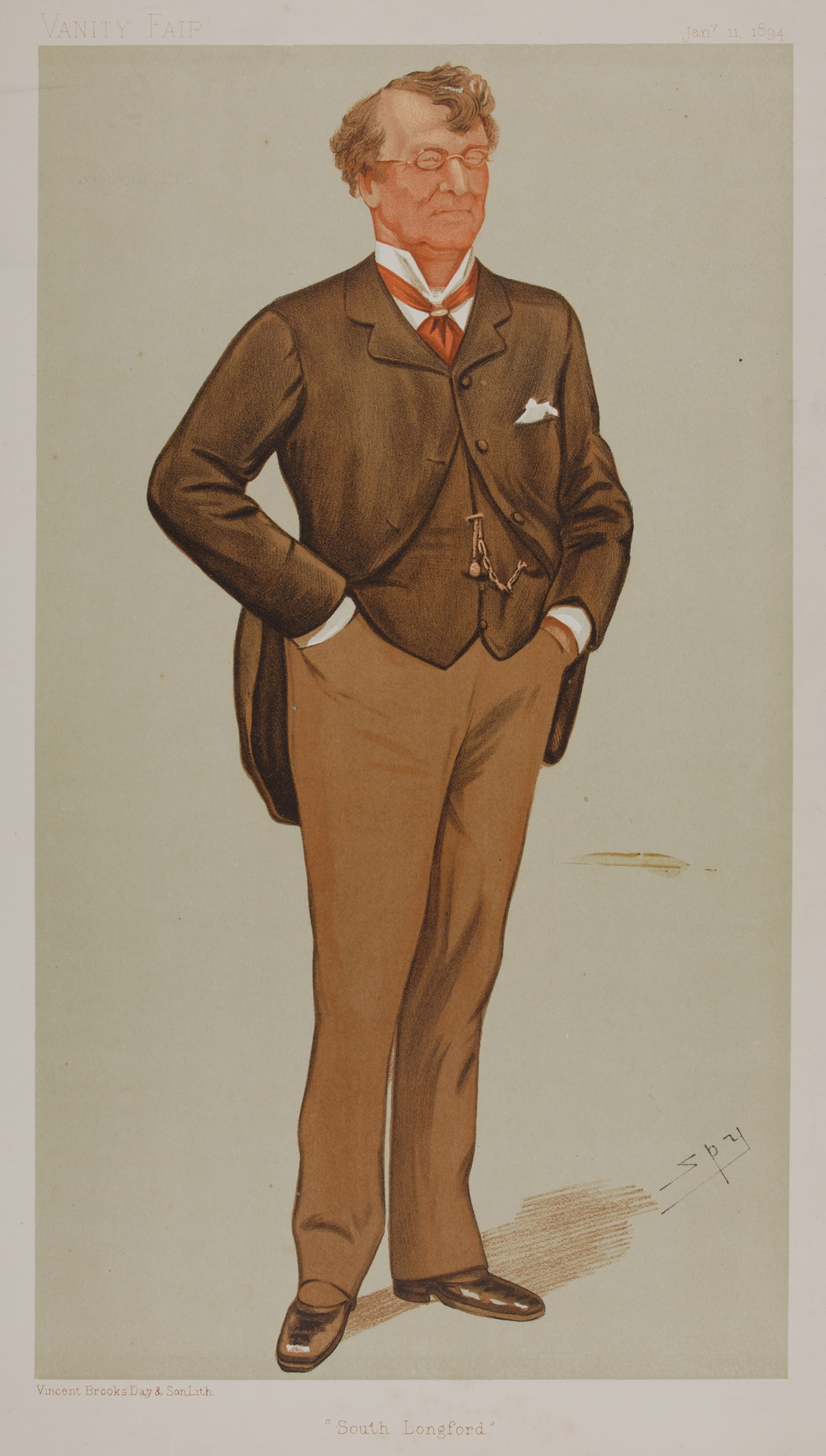
Blake in 1894, as British MP

=== Canada ===
Blake was recruited into active politics by George Brown, elected Member of the Provincial Parliament (Durham West and Bruce South) became leader of the Ontario Liberal Party in 1868 and premier in 1871, but left provincial politics to run in the 1872 federal election, in which he was re-elected. The "dual mandate" rule that allowed a politician to sit simultaneously in a provincial and federal house had been abolished, and Blake chose to abandon his career in provincial politics. He played a major role in exposing the government of Sir John A. Macdonald's complicity in the Pacific Scandal forcing the government's resignation. Blake was offered the prime ministership, but turned it down due to ill health.

When the Liberals won the subsequent 1874 federal election, Blake joined the cabinet of Prime Minister Alexander Mackenzie and served as Minister of Justice and President of the Queen's Privy Council for Canada.

From 1876 to 1900, he was the chancellor of the University of Toronto.

The Liberals were defeated in the 1878 election, and Blake succeeded Mackenzie as party leader in 1880. He failed to defeat Macdonald's Conservatives in the 1882 or 1887 elections. Blake resigned as Liberal leader in 1887, recruiting Wilfrid Laurier as his successor, and left the House of Commons of Canada in 1891.

=== Ireland ===
In the 1892 election, Blake entered the British House of Commons as an Irish Nationalist Member of Parliament (MP) for the constituency of South Longford in the midlands of Ireland. In 1895, he was appointed to the Royal Commission on the Financial Relations between Great Britain and Ireland, which reported in 1896.

Laurier sought several times for Blake's return to Canada by offering him nominations for the Supreme Court and other judicial appointments. However, Blake felt committed to his new role and was particularly committed to home rule in Ireland. His idea of an Irish nation state within a federal empire met with little support.

In May 1907 he suffered a stroke and was partially paralyzed on the left side of his body. He left the British House of Commons in August 1907 upon his appointment as the Steward of the Chiltern Hundreds (a sinecure office used to effect resignation) and retired to Canada.

== Contributions to Canadian federalism ==
He is perhaps best remembered for the arguments that he made to the Judicial Committee of the Privy Council in favour of the Provinces in interpreting the British North America Act. In 1888, he argued the case of St. Catharines Milling v. The Queen in which the federal government was claiming the right to issue timber licenses. This speech was quoted in its entirety in the 1960 report of the Quebec Royal Commission of Inquiry on Constitutional Problems, which influenced many Quebecers, including René Lévesque:

The word federal is the key which unlocks the clauses and reveals their contents. It is the glass that enables us to discern what is written. By its light the Act must be construed ... What then was the general scheme of this Act? First of all, as I suggest, it was to create a federal as distinguished from a legislative union, but a union composed of several existing and continuing entities. It was not the intention of Parliament to mutilate, confound and destroy the provinces mentioned in the preamble, and having from their mangled remains stewed in some legislative cauldron, to evoke by some legislative incantation absolutely new provinces into an absolutely new existence ... it was the design, I say, ... by gentle and considerate terms to preserve the vital breath and continue the political existence of the old provinces. However this may be, they were being made, as has been well said, not fractions of a unit but units of a multiple. The Dominion is the multiple and each province is a unit of that multiple ...

He won the case, and the Privy Council consistently afterwards took the side of the provinces.

== Family ==
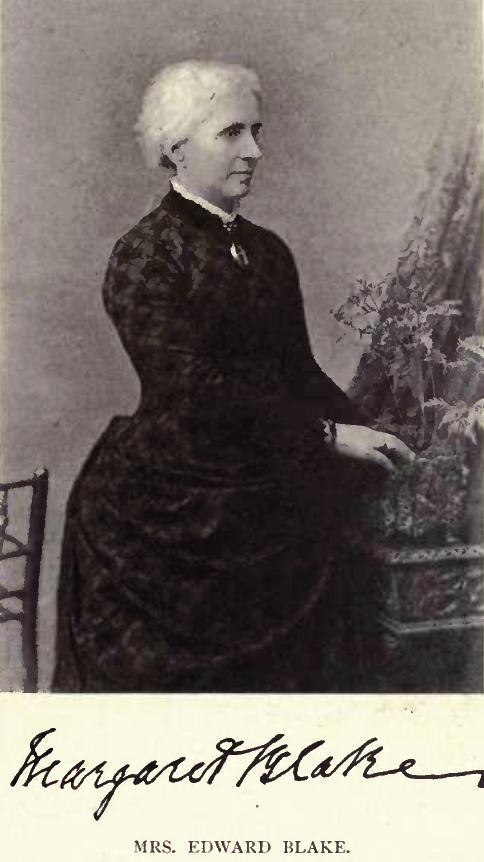
Mrs Margaret Blake wife of Edward Blake

Edward Blake married Margaret Cronyn, the daughter of Benjamin Cronyn and Margaret Ann (Bickerstaff), in 1856. She was born in 1835 and was educated at London, Ontario and in Toronto. Mrs. Blake practiced benevolent and other useful work. She was a member of the Toronto Ladies' Educational Association and served as the Honorary President of the Canadian Branch of the McAll Association in Toronto. She also frequently accompanied her husband on his political tours. The couple had seven children, four of whom survived them. Their daughter Sophia Hume Blake married George M. Wrong and was the mother of Hume Wrong.

== Archives ==
The personal and family papers of Edward Blake can be found at the Archives of Ontario, and the majority of these records were received on indefinite loan from the University of Toronto Library in June 1952. There are also Edward Blake archives at the University of Toronto and Library and Archives Canada.

== Electoral history ==
=== United Kingdom (Ireland) ===
UK general election 13 July 1892: Longford South
Party	Candidate	Votes	%	±%
Irish National Federation	Edward Blake	2,544	88.0	N/A
Liberal Unionist	George Henry Miller	347	12.0	New
Majority		2,197	76.0	N/A
Turnout		2,891	62.7	N/A
Registered electors		4,614		
Irish National Federation gain from Irish Parliamentary		Swing	N/A	

UK general election 19 July 1895: Longford South
Party	Candidate	Votes	%	±%
Irish National Federation	Edward Blake	Unopposed		
Registered electors		4,604		
Irish National Federation hold				

UK general election 4 October 1900: Longford South
Party	Candidate	Votes	%	±%
Irish Parliamentary	Edward Blake	Unopposed		
Registered electors		4,212		
Irish Parliamentary hold				

UK general election 17 January 1906: Longford South
Party	Candidate	Votes	%	±%
Irish Parliamentary	Edward Blake	Unopposed		
Registered electors		3,744		
Irish Parliamentary hold				

=== Federal (Canada) ===
1872 Canadian federal election: Bruce South/Bruce-Sud
Party	Candidate	Votes
Liberal	Edward Blake	1,878
Conservative	Francis Hurdon	190
Source: Canadian Elections Database

On Mr. Blake's appointment as Minister without Portfolio, 7 November 1873:

By-election on 14 December 1873
Party	Candidate	Votes
Liberal	Edward Blake	acclaimed

1874 Canadian federal election: Bruce South
Party	Candidate	Votes
Liberal	Edward Blake	2,312
Unknown	R. Baird	1,991

By-Election: On Mr. Blake's appointment as Minister of Justice, 19 May 1875:

By-election on 2 June 1875
Party	Candidate	Votes
Liberal	Edward Blake	acclaimed

1878 Canadian federal election: Bruce South
Party	Candidate	Votes
Liberal–Conservative	Alexander Shaw	2,673
Liberal	Edward Blake	2,598
Source: Canadian Elections Database

=== Provincial (Ontario) ===
==== Bruce South ====
1867 Ontario general election: Bruce South
Party	Candidate	Votes	%
Liberal	Edward Blake	1,726	50.10
Conservative	T. Broclebank	1,719	49.90
Total valid votes		3,445	84.83
Eligible voters		4,061	
Liberal pickup new district.			
Source: Elections Ontario

1871 Ontario general election: Bruce South
Party	Candidate	Votes	%	±%
Liberal	Edward Blake	2,082	55.21	+5.11
Conservative	Alexander Sproat	1,689	44.79	−5.11
Turnout		3,771	79.79	−5.04
Eligible voters		4,726		
Liberal hold		Swing		+5.11
Source: Elections Ontario

Ontario provincial by-election, January 18, 1872: Bruce South Ministerial by-election
Party	Candidate	Votes
Liberal	Edward Blake	Acclaimed
Source: History of the Electoral Districts, Legislatures and Ministries of the Province of Ontario

==== Durham West ====
1871 Ontario general election: Durham West
Party	Candidate	Votes
Liberal	Edward Blake	Acclaimed
Source: Elections Ontario

== Offices held ==
Political offices, Province of Ontario
Preceded by John Sandfield Macdonald	Premier of Ontario; 1871–1872	Succeeded by Oliver Mowat
Preceded by Archibald McKellar	Leader of the Ontario Liberal Party; 1870–1872	Succeeded by Oliver Mowat
Legislative Assembly of Ontario
Preceded by Archibald McKellar de facto	Leader of the Opposition; 1870–1871	Succeeded by Matthew Crooks Cameron
Preceded by none	MPP For Bruce South; 1867–1872	Succeeded by Rupert Wells
Preceded by none	MPP For Durham West; 1871 (Note: Elected in two electoral districts, resigned this seat upon convening of legislature)	Succeeded by John McLeod
Political offices, Dominion of Canada
Preceded by Alexander Mackenzie	Leader of the Liberal Party of Canada; 1880–1887	Succeeded by Wilfrid Laurier
2nd Canadian Ministry (1873–1878) – Cabinet of Alexander Mackenzie
	Minister without portfolio 1873–1874	
Preceded by Télesphore Fournier	Minister of Justice & Attorney General; 1875–1877	Succeeded by T. A. R. Laflamme
Preceded by Joseph-Édouard Cauchon	President of the Privy Council; 1877–1878	Succeeded by John O'Connor
Parliament of Canada
Preceded by Alexander Mackenzie	Leader of the Opposition; 1880–1887	Succeeded by Wilfrid Laurier
Preceded by none	MP for Durham West, ON; 1867–1872	Succeeded by Edmund Burke Wood
Preceded by Francis Hurdon	MP for Bruce South, ON; 1872–1878	Succeeded by Alexander Shaw
Preceded by Harvey William Burk	MP for Durham West, ON; 1879–1891	Succeeded by Robert Beith
Political offices, United Kingdom
Parliament of the United Kingdom
Preceded by James Gubbins Fitzgerald	MP for South Longford; 1892–1906	Succeeded by John Phillips
Other offices
Academic offices
Preceded by Joseph Curran Morrison	Chancellor of the University of Toronto; 1876–1900	Succeeded by William Ralph Meredith
