= 1882 Canadian federal election =

- June 20, 1882

211 seats in the House of Commons 106 seats needed for a majority
- Turnout: 70.3% (▲1.2 pp)

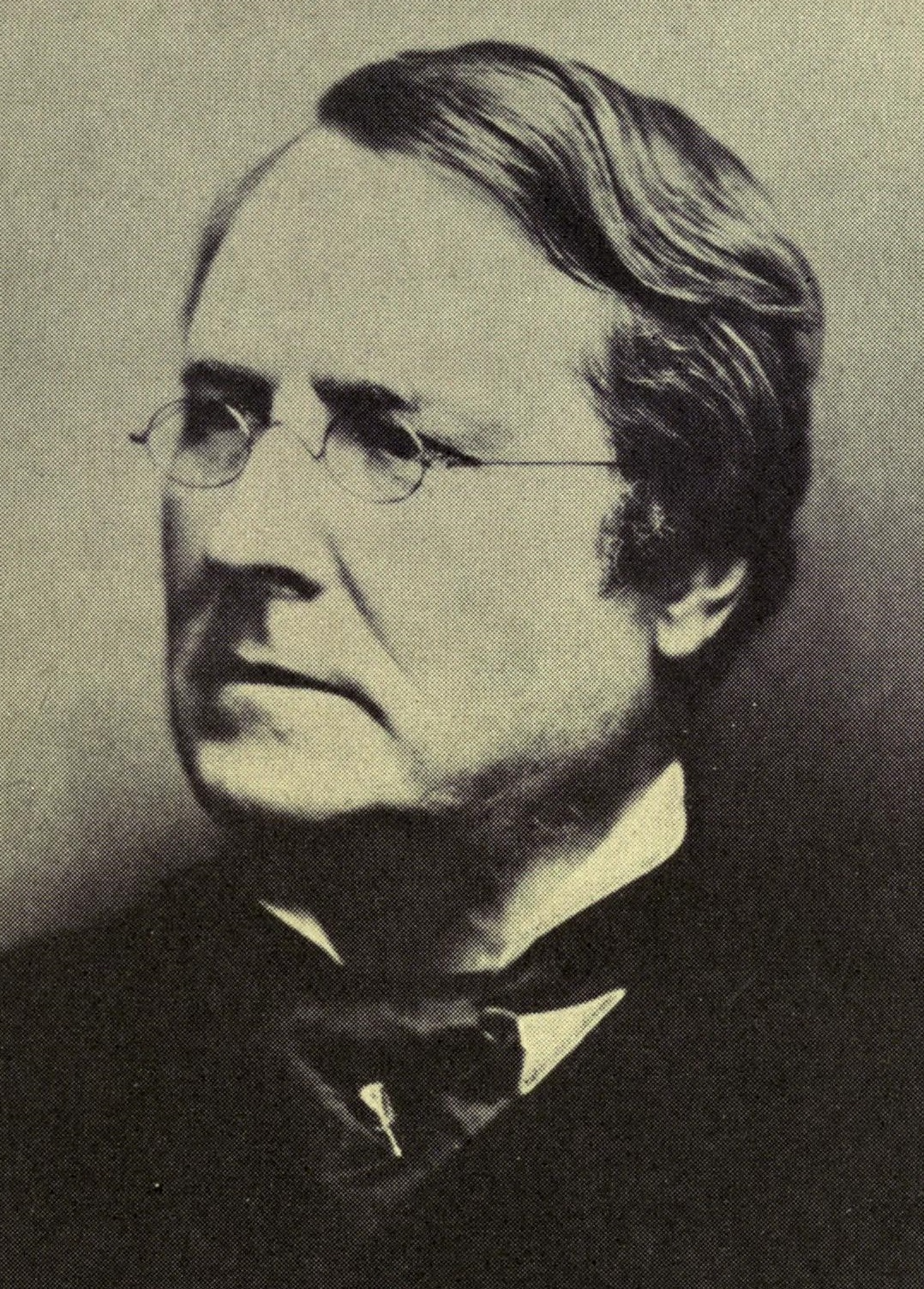
	First party	Second party
Leader	John A. Macdonald	Edward Blake
Party	Conservative	Liberal
Leader since	July 1, 1867	May 4, 1880
Leader's seat	Carleton (Note: Macdonald was also elected in Lennox; he chose to sit for Carleton instead, and resigned as the Member of Parliament for Lennox.)	Durham West
Last election	134 seats, 42.1%	63 seats, 33.1%
Seats won	133	73
Seat change	▼1	▲10
Popular vote	208,544	160,574
Percentage	40.4%	31.1%
Swing	▼1.7 pp	▼2.0 pp
- 1882 Canadian electoral map

- The Canadian parliament after the 1882 election
Prime Minister before election
John A. Macdonald
Conservative
Prime Minister after election
John A. Macdonald
Conservative

The 1882 Canadian federal election was held on June 20, 1882, to elect members of the House of Commons of Canada of the 5th Parliament of Canada.

Prime Minister Sir John A. Macdonald's Conservatives and Liberal-Conservatives retained power, defeating the Liberal Party of Edward Blake.

== National results ==

Party	Party leader	# of candidates	Seats			Popular vote		
Party	Party leader	# of candidates	1878	Elected	Change	#	%	Change
Conservative	John A. Macdonald	118	83	94	+13.3%	143,684	27.83%	-1.67pp
Liberal-Conservative	John A. Macdonald	50	46	39	-8.7%	64,860	12.56%	-3.22pp
Liberal	Edward Blake	112	57	73	+26.3%	160,547	31.10%	+1.95pp
Independent		7	5	1	-80%	8,227	1.59%	-1.12pp
Nationalist Conservative		1	-	1	-	1,084	0.21%	+0.14pp
Independent Liberal		3	2	2	-	5,740	1.11%	+0.12pp
Independent Conservative		2	2	1	-50%	927	0.18%	-
Unknown		121	9	-	-100%	131,178	25.41%	+4.48pp
Total		414	204	211	+4.4%	516,247	100.0%	-
Sources: http://www.elections.ca -- History of Federal Ridings since 1867

Acclamations:

The following Members of Parliament were elected by acclamation;

- British Columbia: 2 Liberal-Conservatives
- Manitoba: 1 Conservative
- Ontario: 2 Conservatives
- Quebec: 11 Conservatives, 1 Independent Conservative, 4 Liberal-Conservatives, 3 Liberals
- New Brunswick: 1 Liberal-Conservative, 1 Independent
- Nova Scotia: 1 Conservative

== Results by province ==
Party name		BC	MB	ON	QC	NB	NS	PE	Total
Conservative	Seats:	3	2	39	38	4	8	-	94
Conservative	Popular vote (%):	38.4	13.6	27.0	37.7	25.6	23.0	17.1	27.8
Liberal-Conservative	Seats:	3	1	13	12	3	5	2	39
Liberal-Conservative	Vote (%):	15.8	38.9	9.1	10.4	7.1	25.8	25.4	12.6
Liberal	Seats:	-	2	40	12	7	8	4	73
Liberal	Vote (%):	10.6	25.3	31.9	21.5	36.8	38.7	40.7	31.1
Independent	Seats:			-	-	1	-		1
Independent	Vote (%):			1.7	0.8	0.4	4.8		1.6
Nationalist Conservative	Seats:				1				1
Nationalist Conservative	Vote (%):				1.0				0.2
Independent Liberal	Seats:			-	1	1			2
Independent Liberal	Vote (%):			0.7	1.5	6.2			1.1
Independent Conservative	Seats:				1				1
Independent Conservative	Vote (%):				0.9				0.2
Unknown	Vote (%):	35.2	22.2	29.6	27.1	23.9	7.7	16.8	25.4
Total seats		6	5	92	65	16	21	6	211

== See also ==
- List of Canadian federal general elections
- 5th Canadian Parliament
