= Hurling in popular culture =

Instances of the Gaelic sport in popular culture

Hurling (Irish: Iománaíocht/Iomáint), the Gaelic sport, is a prominent feature in popular culture.

== In film ==
Hurling and Hollywood have long been linked. Several awards have resulted from the depiction of hurling in film, including the Palme d'Or and several Academy Award nominations:

- The 1930s Warner Brothers short film Sports Thrills, narrated by CBS broadcaster Ted Husing, demonstrated hurling.
- A 1936 MGM-commissioned short series, directed by David Miller, portrayed hurling as "bordering on savage" with "all the Hollywood stereo-type images of the Irish back then, short of drinking, on the field". The GAA complained and attempted to have some of the more unpleasant scenes removed.
- The 1952 film The Quiet Man features the famous line: “If you knew your country's history as well as you claim to know it, Mr Bailey, you'd know that the Mayo hurlers haven't been beaten west of the Shannon for the last twenty-two years”
- A 1955 Paramount Studios-commissioned short film, Three Kisses, directed by Justin Herman, was nominated for an Academy Award.
- The 1956 John Ford film The Rising of the Moon featured a badly bruised and bandaged but victorious local hurling team, leading to "deep concern" about Hollywood's tendency to overdo the bad side of hurling. Novelist Flann O'Brien (The Third Policeman, At Swim-Two-Birds) satirized the disagreement in his newspaper column.
- During filming of the 1958 Rank Studios film Rooney titular actor John Gregson ran out onto the Croke Park turf with the teams ahead of the 1957 All-Ireland Senior Championship Final between Kilkenny and Waterford. He wore a Kilkenny jersey to film the part.
- In the Disney production Secret of Boyne Castle 1969 - episode 1, Kurt Russell was playing Hurling at the boarding school where the mini series starts.
- The 2006 Ken Loach film The Wind That Shakes the Barley, set in 1920, opens with a Sunday hurling match in County Cork. The film won the Palme d'Or at the 2006 Cannes Film Festival.
- In the opening scenes of the 2011 film Blitz, London Metropolitan Police DS Tom Brant (Jason Statham) uses a hurley to savagely beat up three would be car thieves. Brant is heard to say, "This, lads, is a hurley, used in the Irish game of hurling; a cross between hockey and murder".
- The Have a Word Podcast featured Hurling in their February 2024 Patreon special titled "The GAA Special".
- In the 2001 buddy-comedy film "Bandits", Troy Garrity's character, stuntman/driver Harvey Pollard states "Did you know you can bet on Irish Hurling? . . . It's like football, but with sticks!" Garrity is the son of Jane Fonda and Tom Hayden.

== In literature ==
- Cín Lae Amhlaoibh, an early 19th century diary written in Callan, County Kilkenny by local schoolmaster and merchant Amhlaoibh Ó Súilleabháin, makes several references to local hurling matches.
- Tomás O'Crohan's memoir 'An tOileánach ("The Islandman") famously describes the extremely informal and rough nature of hurling matches before the newly founded Gaelic Athletic Association standardized the rules and assigned referees. According to O'Crohan, hurling matches were played upon the beach of Great Blasket Island every day between Christmas Day and Epiphany. The ball was often chased into the waves and the injuries to the players were so extreme that no one was able afterwards to drive their sheep or goats up the hillside.
- The Hurley Maker's Son - a memoir by Patrick Deeley, which takes an in-depth look at the craft of hurley making during the author's childhood in a small townland in Galway - was shortlisted for the Irish Book Awards in 2016.
- Hurling is referenced in the works of James Joyce; he mentions it in A Portrait of the Artist as a Young Man (1916) and Ulysses (1922).
- Samuel Beckett's novel Murphy references hurling.
- In Edna O'Brien's short story "Sister Imelda", the title character's brother is killed while returning home from a hurling match.
- In John Banville's novella The Newton Letter (1982), the character Edward "appeared, brandishing a hurley stick", which he later "leaned on, [...] admiring his drink" before taking it up again after urinating against a chestnut tree. "Still held dangled down" by the narrator's side, Edward then proceeds to "gently bat" him with the hurley stick.
- In Anthony Cronin's major long poem The End of the Modern World (1989), a reference to at least one "Kerry hurler" appears twice in II 86 (Kerry are more renowned for their footballing prowess; they are not, and were not at the time of the poem's publication, a serious hurling team - though they had won All-Ireland Senior B Hurling Championships in 1976, 1983 and 1986):

Picabia at the wheel of a Bugatti,
The horn's bulb to his painterly right hand,
Peaked cap reversed like any Kerry hurler.
Strange opposites, but both suffering myths.
And this was nearer than the Kerry hurlers,
A strapped down bonnet and the dream of booting
Round Brooklands or along the Great North Road.

- The Colm Tóibín novel Brooklyn (2009) features an exchange between two characters involving the confusion that may occur when discussing the similarities between hurling and the American sport of baseball.
- In Glenanaar, a 1905 novel by Canon Sheehan, hurling features.
- In The Fortune of War (the sixth of Patrick O'Brian's Aubrey-Maturin novels) Stephen Maturin, applies his hurling skills when called upon as batsman in a cricket match, to the astonishment and "stark, silent amazement" of all.
- In Walter Macken's novel Rain on the Wind, one of his Irish trilogy, a game of hurling takes place, and the history and background to the game is explained; however, a player gets injured in the course of the game.
- The Eoin Colfer novel Benny and Omar (1998) is about a young hurler named Benny who moves from Ireland to Tunisia.
- Hugo Hamilton's book The Speckled People (2003) contains numerous references to hurling which he uses to come to terms with Irish and German history.
- Many of Caimh McDonnell's stories feature a youth hurling team coached by the character Bunny McGarry, such as Escape From Victory (2023).

== In music ==
- A "hurley ball" is referenced in The Pogues' song The Broad Majestic Shannon: "A rusty tin can and an old hurley ball." The song appears on the LP If I Should Fall from Grace with God, and was written by front man Shane MacGowan.
- Bruce Springsteen is a hurling fan and follows Limerick.
- A hurley and the ball are mentioned in the Miracle of Sound song The Tale of Cú Chulainn, when the titular character uses his hurley to "puck" the ball through the head of a dog (or cú) owned by a smith.
- The popular traditional Irish song The bold Thady Quill celebrates a hurler from Ballinagree, County Cork and his exploits on and off the field.
- The 2 Johnnies song “Junior B All-Star” is centred around a Junior B hurling side.Also The song “Could have played County” it follows the story of how one of the Johnnies could have played for the Tipperary county hurling team.
- Limerick-based folk band Kingfishr released a song about hurling club Killeagh GAA, titled “Killeagh”, in 2024.

== In television ==
- Doug Ross, the character played by George Clooney in ER, mentioned planning to watch "Irish hurling" in a season one episode. This has been described as "hurling's biggest pop culture moment ever."
- In the final scene of the 2015 RTÉ One drama series Clean Break, screened on Netflix, Desmond is calling a live hurling game for a large stadium crowd.
- In a proposed Irish language version of Cheers, Teach Seán, Hurling would have substituted baseball as the main character's former sport.
- The male members of the Dillon family, Tommy and Zak, in Fair City display an interest in hurling. When they first arrive from Kilkenny a storyline revolves around Zak's determination to play rugby instead of his father's favourite sport, hurling.
- In a popular Guinness beer commercial, shown in the US, Ireland, and the UK, made in 2007, had a player preparing for a Free as the last play of the game, the opposing sides were lined up, and in the build-up before the shot, the player experiences nervousness imagines the ball become a cement cube, and the men at the goal looking like orcs with shields in front of him. upon the announcer saying what would inspire the player, it shows the bartender putting down a freshly poured pint of Guinness beer at an Irish Pub, as the going from cloudy gold to clear black, the player growing confident makes the play, and strikes the ball, and the words "believe" appear at the end of the commercial, leaving the ending of whether he made a goal or not ambiguous
- In Bob's Burgers, recurring character Kathleen (Sharon Horgan) is a fan of hurling, which she describes as "if hockey, soccer, and baseball had a baby, and that baby joined a gang."
- In series 14 of Taskmaster, contestant Dara Ó Briain played a modified version of hurling to complete one of his tasks.
- The Disney Channel Original Movie Descendants featured the male characters playing in a hurling match with some additional elements added to highlight the fairy tale nature of the production.
