= 1916 in Ireland =

- Centuries: 18th; 19th; 20th; 21st
- Decades: 1890s; 1900s; 1910s; 1920s; 1930s
- See also: 1916 in the United Kingdom; Other events of 1916; List of years in Ireland

Events from the year 1916 in Ireland.

== Events ==
- 14 February – John Redmond was re-elected Chairman of the Irish Parliamentary Party in Dublin.
- 29 February – The week-long Feis (arts and culture festival) opened in Derry.
- 21 March – A crowd attacked the Sinn Féin party's Tullamore headquarters; three police were injured.
- 20–21 April – The German-controlled cargo steamer SS Libau, masquerading as SS Aud, was intercepted by the Royal Navy and scuttled following an unsuccessful attempt to land arms for the Irish Volunteers in Tralee Bay.
- 21 April – Roger Casement and two others were arrested at Banna Strand, County Kerry, for attempting to land arms and ammunition.
- 22 April – Eoin MacNeill, Chief of Staff of the Irish Volunteers cancelled all manoeuvres of Volunteers planned for the following day.
- 23 April – Easter Sunday: The military council of the Irish Republican Brotherhood met at Liberty Hall in Dublin and decided to begin the planned insurrection at noon the next day. The Proclamation of the Republic was signed by the seven leaders in the name of the Provisional Government of the Irish Republic. Volunteers from Belfast and County Cork began manoeuvres, but returned home.

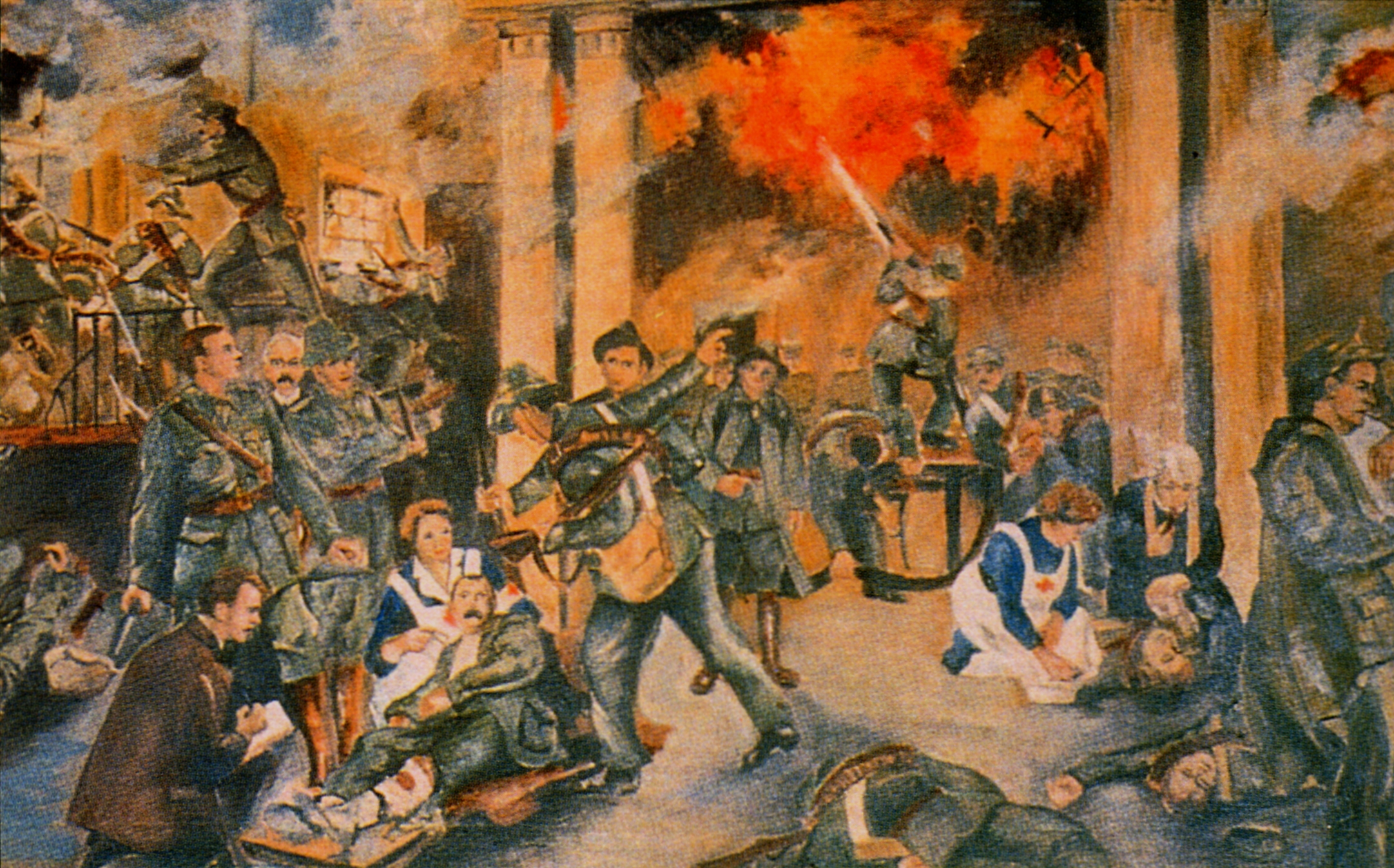
Birth of the Irish Republic by Walter Paget: the General Post Office during the Easter Rising.

- 24 April – The Easter Rising began in Dublin. The Irish Volunteers and the Irish Citizen Army occupied the General Post Office, City Hall, the College of Surgeons, the Four Courts, Jacob's Factory, Boland's Mills, the South Dublin Union, and the Mendicity Institution. At noon Patrick Pearse read the Proclamation outside the General Post Office. Liam Mellows led a rising of Volunteers in County Galway.
- 25 April – Martial law was declared in Dublin by the British authorities for a period of one month.
- 26 April
  - Francis Sheehy-Skeffington, Thomas Dickson and Patrick McIntyre were summarily executed at Portobello Barracks.
  - Dublin-built HMS Helga shelled Liberty Hall from the River Liffey.
  - The Battle of Mount Street Bridge was fought.
- 27 April
  - Major-General Sir John Maxwell arrived in Dublin to take command of the British Army, 12,000 of whose troops were now in the city; the centre was cordoned off.
  - Gas attacks at Hulluch in France: The 47th Brigade, 16th (Irish) Division lost 442 men in one of the most heavily concentrated German gas attacks of World War I.
  - Newspaper strike in Dublin, until 5 May.
- 28 April – Battle of Ashbourne: A group of Volunteers at Ashbourne, County Meath, forced the Royal Irish Constabulary to surrender, with the loss of eight police and two Volunteers.
- 29 April – At 3.45 pm, Patrick Pearse, James Connolly and Thomas MacDonagh surrendered unconditionally as the Easter Rising collapsed.
- 1 May – The Easter Rising collapsed. Sir John Maxwell, Commander-in-Chief of the British forces, announced that all involved in the insurrection had surrendered.
- 3 May – Following their courts martial, Patrick Pearse, Thomas MacDonagh and Thomas J. Clarke were executed at Kilmainham Gaol.
- 4 May – The executions continued. Joseph Plunkett, Michael O'Hanrahan, Edward Daly and Willie Pearse were executed for their part in the Rising. The Chief Secretary of Ireland, Augustine Birrell, resigned.
- 5 May – John MacBride, another leader of the Rising, was executed. W. T. Cosgrave was sentenced to death, however, this was later commuted to penal servitude for life.
- 8 May – Another four leaders of the Easter Rising were executed. They were Éamonn Ceannt, Conn Colbert, Michael Mallin, and Seán Heuston.
- 11 May – During a debate in the Parliament of the United Kingdom on the Irish crisis, John Dillon of the Irish Parliamentary Party called on the British government to end the executions of the Easter Rising leaders.
- 12 May – Two more leaders, Seán Mac Diarmada and James Connolly were executed. Connolly, who was wounded in the fighting, was strapped to a chair and shot. Meanwhile, Prime Minister H. H. Asquith arrived in Dublin for a week-long visit.
- 15 May – The trial of Roger Casement began in London. He was charged with high treason for his part in the Easter Rising.

Kilmainham Gaol cell of Éamon de Valera.

- 17 May – Thomas O'Dwyer, Roman Catholic Bishop of Limerick, refused a request to discipline two of his curates who expressed republican sympathies. He reminded General Maxwell that he had shown no mercy to those who surrendered.
- 21 May – Daylight saving time began for the first time throughout the United Kingdom as people put their clocks forward one hour. The purpose was to reduce the number of evening hours, to save fuel.
- 26 June – Roger Casement went on trial at the Royal Courts of Justice on a charge of treason. He had been stripped of his knighthood.
- 1 July – The Battle of the Somme began in France. The 36th Ulster Division, which contained many Ulster Volunteers, lost 5,500 men in the first two days.
- 23 July – Thousands attended an open-air meeting at the Phoenix Park in Dublin to discuss the British government's Irish partition proposals. It was the first open-air meeting since martial law was proclaimed.
- 3 August – Roger Casement was hanged for high treason at Pentonville Prison in London.
- 19 August – The Irish Times in Dublin issued a 264-page handbook detailing the events of the Easter Rising; a second edition was published by the end of the year.
- 1 October – Time in Ireland: Dublin Mean Time (25 minutes behind Greenwich Mean Time) was replaced by British time from 2 am today under the terms of the Time (Ireland) Act 1916.
- 29 October – John Redmond demanded the abolition of martial law, the release of suspected persons, and that Irish prisoners be treated as political prisoners.
- 3 November – Railway steamer SS Connemara and coalship SS Retriever collided and sank in Carlingford Lough, County Down, with the loss of 94 lives.
- 5 November – Honan Chapel, Cork, a product of the Irish Arts and Crafts movement, was dedicated.
- 18 November – The Battle of the Somme ended after 141 days, stopped by foul weather and with thousands of Irish casualties.
- 21 December – In the British House of Commons, it was announced that all Irish prisoners were to be released.
- 25 December – The last group of Irish prisoners, 460 men from Reading Gaol, arrived in Dublin. Seán T. O'Kelly and Arthur Griffith were among those released.

== Arts and literature ==
- 2 April – W. B. Yeats's play At the Hawk's Well was first performed, privately in London.
- 7 August – There was a large audience at the Bohemian Theatre in Dublin for the first screening of the Film Company of Ireland's first film, O'Neill of the Glen.
- September – W. B. Yeats' poem Easter 1916 was written.
- 13 December – Lennox Robinson's play The Whiteheaded Boy was premiered at the Abbey Theatre in Dublin.
- 29 December – James Joyce's semi-autobiographical novel A Portrait of the Artist as a Young Man was first published complete in book form in New York.
- Daniel Corkery's short stories, A Munster Twilight, were published.
- George Noble Plunkett was dismissed from his post as curator of the National Museum of Ireland and deported to Oxford.

== Sport ==
=== Association football ===
- Irish League
  Winners: Linfield
- Irish Cup
  Winners: Linfield 1–1, 1–0 Glentoran

=== Gaelic games ===
- Senior Football Championship
  Winners: Wexford
  Wexford 3–4 : 1–2 Mayo
- Senior Hurling Championship
  Winners: Tipperary
  Tipperary (Boherlahan) 5–4 : 3–2 Kilkenny (Tullaroan)

== Births ==
- 19 March – James Jackman, recipient of the Victoria Cross for gallantry at Tobruk, Libya, the day before his death (killed in action 1941).
- 19 March – Peter Kavanagh, writer, scholar and publisher (died 2006).
- 13 April – Ralph Cusack, English High Court judge (died 1978 in England).
- 20 April – Gerard Dillon, painter (died 1971).
- 20 May – Francis Blackwood, 10th Baron Dufferin and Claneboye (died 1991).
- 21 May – Sam Thompson, playwright (died 1965).
- 30 May – Jackie Power, Limerick hurler and Gaelic footballer (died 1994).
- 6 July – Hugh Gibbons, Roscommon Gaelic footballer and Fianna Fáil party Teachta Dála (TD) (died 2007).
- 23 July – Tom O'Higgins, barrister and judge, Irish Chief Justice, Fine Gael party TD and twice defeated Irish presidential candidate (died 2003).
- 31 July – Brian Inglis, journalist, historian and television presenter (died 1993).
- 14 August – Máirín Lynch, wife of Taoiseach Jack Lynch (died 2004).
- 4 September – Alexis FitzGerald Snr, solicitor, Fine Gael senator (died 1985).
- 8 September – John M. Feehan, author and publisher (died 1991).
- 24 September – Robin Kinahan, Unionist politician and businessman (died 1997).
- 3 October – Frank Pantridge, physician, cardiologist and inventor of the portable defibrillator (died 2004).
- 11 October – Maurice Gaffney, barrister (died 2016).
- 17 October – Jack Bowden, cricketer and hockey player (died 1988).
- 27 October – Nigel Trench, 7th Baron Ashtown, peer and diplomat (died 2010).
- 3 November – Rúaidhrí de Valera, archaeologist (died 1978).
- 10 November – Louis le Brocquy, artist (died 2012).
- 25 November – Cosmo Haskard, British Army officer, Governor of the Falkland Islands (died 2017).
- 8 December – T. K. Whitaker, civil servant, economist (died 2017).
- 14 December – Tomás de Bhaldraithe, Irish language scholar and lexicographer (died 1996).
- 16 December – Michael Carty, Fianna Fáil TD (died 1975).
- 21 December – Seán Brosnan, barrister, Fianna Fáil TD and Senator (died 1979).
- 25 December – Noel Larmour, cricketer and diplomat (died 1999).
- Paddy Fahey, fiddler (died 2019)

== Deaths ==
- 9 January – Ada Rehan, actress in the United States (born circa 1857).
- 18 March – Stopford Augustus Brooke, preacher and writer on literature (born 1832).
- 26 April
  - Francis Browning, cricketer (born 1868).
  - Francis Sheehy-Skeffington, suffragist, pacifist and writer, murdered by British Army (born 1878).
- 29 April – The O'Rahilly, killed during the Easter Rising (born 1875).
- 3 May
  - Tom Clarke, nationalist, rebel and organiser of the Easter Rising, executed (born 1857).
  - Thomas MacDonagh, nationalist, poet, rebel and an Easter Rising leader, executed (born 1878).
  - Patrick Pearse, teacher, barrister, poet, writer, nationalist and political activist, an Easter Rising leader, executed (born 1879).
- 4 May
  - Edward Daly, Easter Rising participant, executed by firing squad (born 1891).
  - Willie Pearse, Easter Rising participant, executed, brother of Patrick Pearse (born 1891).
  - Joseph Plunkett, nationalist, poet, journalist and an Easter Rising leader, executed (born 1887).
- 5 May – John MacBride, nationalist, rebel and Easter Rising leader, executed (born 1865).
- 8 May
  - Éamonn Ceannt, nationalist, rebel and Easter Rising leader, executed (born 1881).
  - Conn Colbert, nationalist and rebel, Easter Rising participant, executed (born 1888).
  - Seán Heuston, Fianna Éireann member, Easter Rising participant, executed by firing squad in Kilmainham Gaol (born 1891).
  - Michael Mallin, second in command of Irish Citizen Army, Easter Rising participant, executed by firing squad in Kilmainham Gaol (born 1874).
- 9 May – Thomas Kent, nationalist and rebel, executed following a gunfight with the Royal Irish Constabulary (born 1865).
- 12 May
  - James Connolly, socialist, trade unionist, nationalist, rebel and Easter Rising leader, executed (born 1868).
  - Seán Mac Diarmada, nationalist, rebel and Easter Rising leader, executed (born 1883).
- 5 June – Herbert Kitchener, 1st Earl Kitchener, British Field Marshal and statesman (born 1850).
- 1 July – William Crozier, cricketer (born 1873).
- 23 July – Thomas MacDonald Patterson, politician and newspaper publisher in the United States (born 1839).
- 3 August – Roger Casement, British diplomat, nationalist, poet and Irish revolutionary, executed at Pentonville Prison (born 1864).
- 25 August – Maurice O'Rorke, politician and Speaker of the New Zealand House of Representatives (born 1830).
- 9 September – Tom Kettle, writer, barrister, Nationalist politician and economist, killed in action (born 1880).
- 19 October – Alexander Young, soldier, recipient of the Victoria Cross for gallantry in 1901 at Ruiterskraal, South Africa, killed in action (born 1873).
- 25 October – John Todhunter, poet and playwright (born 1839).
- 2 November – Frank Hugh O'Donnell, writer and nationalist politician (born 1846).
- 18 December – Henry Mitchell Jones, recipient of the Victoria Cross for gallantry in 1855 at Sebastopol in Crimea (born 1831).
- 22 December – James O'Kelly, nationalist politician and journalist, Irish Parliamentary Party member of parliament (born 1845).
