= Leinster Irish =

Irish language dialect

- Leinster Gaelic
- Gaeilge Laighean
- Pronunciation: [ˈɡeːlʲɟə ˈl̪ˠəinˠ]
- Ethnicity: Irish
- Native speakers: (0 cited 1960)
- Language family: Indo-European: Celtic; Insular Celtic; Goidelic; Irish; Leinster Irish
- Early forms: Primitive Irish: Old Irish; Middle Irish; Early Modern Irish
- Dialects: Old Leinster; Midlands; Oriel; Ossory
- Writing system: Latin (Irish alphabet); Irish Braille

Language codes
- ISO 639-3: –
- Glottolog: muns1250
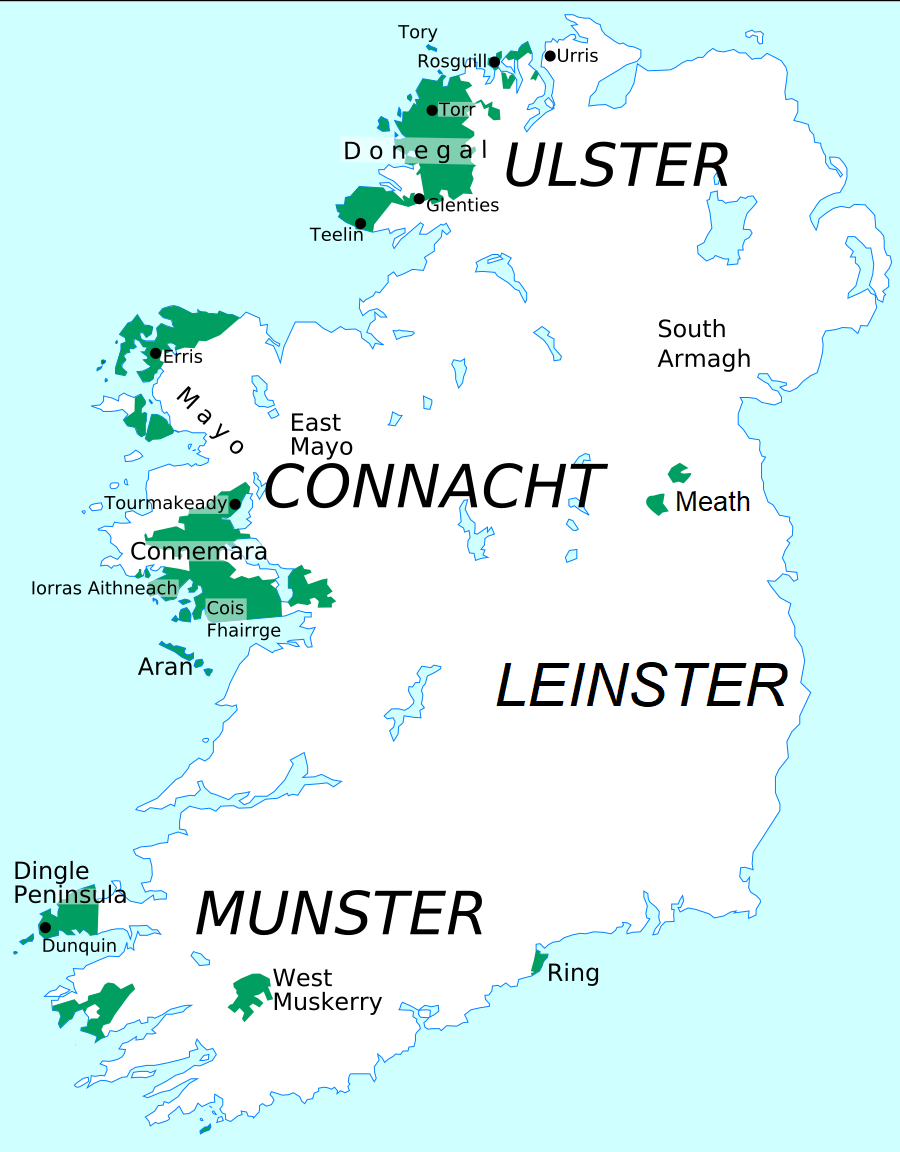
- Official Gaeltacht regions in Ireland.

Leinster Irish (Irish: Gaeilge Laighean) is the dialect of the Irish language that was spoken in the province of Leinster, Ireland. Although Irish was historically the native language of the province, Leinster Irish is now extinct as a distinct native dialect, with the last known traditional native speaker passing away in 1960.

Because dialects form a geographic continuum, Leinster Irish was not a monolithic entity, but rather functioned as a bridge between the surviving provincial dialects. Scholars divide the province into four historical sub-dialects: Old Leinster in the southeast (the unique core dialect of the province), Midlands in the northwest (which shared features with Connacht Irish), Oriel in the northeast (which was heavily tied to Ulster Irish) and Ossory in the southwest (which shared heavy linguistic affinities with Munster Irish).

Today, while there is a modern Gaeltacht in County Meath (at Ráth Chairn and Baile Ghib), this was established in the 1930s by migrating speakers from Connemara; thus, the Irish natively spoken there today is a sub-dialect of Connacht Irish, rather than the historical Leinster dialect.

== History ==
Irish was the dominant language of Leinster before and after the 8th century. Despite the heavy influence of the Old Norse in the Kingdom of Dublin and the later Cambro-Norman invasion in the 12th century, Irish remained widely spoken throughout the province. For centuries, the Anglo-Norman descendants and Old English families heavily intermarried with the native Irish, resulting in widespread bilingualism even among the lords of the Pale (the area directly controlled by the English Crown radiating out from Dublin).

However, Leinster was the earliest province to undergo heavy anglicisation. Due to the influence of the Pale, the English language began to replace Irish as the language of trade, law, and prestige much earlier than in the west or south. By the mid-18th century, English had become the language of the middle class in Leinster, who adopted it for social and economic advancement.

Despite this, Irish survived strongly in the peripheries of the province well into the 19th century. Pre-Famine census data and historical records show that in 1831, significant numbers of people in counties like Louth, Meath, and Kilkenny were native Irish speakers. The Great Famine (1845–1852) decimated the rural, poorer populations of Leinster who were the primary custodians of the language, pushing the remaining native speakers into isolated pockets where the language eventually died out in the 20th century.

== Sub-dialects ==
Ancient kingdoms of Gaelic Ireland, including Leinster, Meath (Mide), Oriel (Airgíalla) and Ossory (Osraige)

Leinster Irish was a dialect continuum heavily influenced by the boundaries of ancient kingdoms of Gaelic Ireland rather than modern county lines. Scholars generally group the province into four primary historical sub-dialect zones, which can be mapped approximately to the kingdoms of Leinster, Meath, Oriel and Ossory.

=== Old Leinster (Southeast Leinster) ===
Encompassing the eastern seaboard and the south-east (Dublin, Kildare, Wicklow, Wexford, and South Meath), this was the unique core dialect of the province, approximating the old kingdom of Leinster and the eastern part of the old kingdom of Meath. It was geographically cut off from the influence of the other provincial dialects, developing its own distinct phonology and lexicon. Because this region encompassed the Pale and the fertile agricultural lands of the east, Old Leinster was the earliest dialect zone to undergo heavy anglicisation. While Irish was still the language of the majority in Dublin's hinterland into the 16th century, it was rapidly marginalised. The dialect survived in rural midland and mountainous pockets into the 19th century, but went completely extinct before modern audio recordings could capture any native speakers.

Nonetheless, early 20th-century fieldwork by local historians, particularly Donn S. Piatt, recorded fragments of the dialect from elderly informants who had heard it from parents or grandparents. According to Piatt's research, Old Leinster Irish overwhelmingly placed stress on the first syllable of a word. Unlike the Midlands and Connacht, Old Leinster speakers generally pronounced the ao vowel cluster as an é (/e:/)—though local exceptions like an í (/i:/) sound existed in parts of Dublin—and realized broad bh and mh as a "v" sound. Grammatically, the dialect utilized vigesimal counting (e.g., trí fichid for sixty), unique interrogatives like Gá (where) and Gathain (when), and frequently employed relative verb endings in the present tense, such as -anns (e.g., an fear a chualanns).

In south County Dublin, Irish is reported to have persisted around Glenasmole and Bohernabreena into the 1830s, with the first sermon at the newly opened Bohernabreena chapel in 1870 reportedly still delivered in Irish. In north County Dublin, tradition held that a family near The Naul were among the last local speakers, with one informant, Catherine Kirwan, said to have retained "very little" Irish by her death around 1899. In County Kildare, Piatt collected a single sentence of Kill Irish, Tá mé gul awailí (a local pronunciation of Tá mé ag dul abhaile, "I am going home"), later re-transliterated by Ó hÓgáin as Tá mé ag go'il abhailí. Further south, Irish is said to have lasted "nearly to the Famine" around Aughrim, while the last fully authenticated native speakers in the Glenealy area, Andrew and Hanna Byrne, died in 1830. Offaly Irish is comparatively well documented for a Old Leinster variety, thanks to 33 pages of collected texts in Ó hÓgáin's Labhrann Laighnigh.

=== Midlands (Northwest Leinster) ===
Encompassing the inland counties of Westmeath, Longford, and Offaly, the Irish of the Midlands functioned as a transitional continuum into Connacht Irish across the River Shannon. While maintaining the standard Leinster strict first-syllable word stress, it shared significant phonetic traits with the dialects of East Galway and Roscommon. Notably, the midland speakers pronounced the ao vowel cluster as an í (/i:/) and realized broad bh and mh as a "w" sound. Due to its proximity to the rural west, this dialect survived longer than the east coast varieties, holding out in isolated pockets into the mid-to-late 19th century.

=== Oriel (Northeast Leinster) ===
The Irish spoken in the north eastern counties of Leinster (specifically Louth and North Meath) belonged to the wider Oriel dialect zone, which historically also encompassed County Armagh and County Monaghan. Functioning as a southern extension of Ulster Irish, this sub-dialect survived longer than the other Leinster varieties. Native speakers held out in the Cooley Mountains around Omeath well into the mid-20th century. Its final known native speaker, Anne O'Hanlon (Anna Uí Annluain) of Lislea, Omeath (died 1960) was recorded by Proinsias Ó Conluain speaking in her native Oriel dialect in 1949.

=== Ossory (Southwest Leinster) ===
Historically acting as a buffer kingdom between Leinster and Munster, the region of Ossory (encompassing counties Kilkenny, Laois and western Carlow) was linguistically tied to Munster Irish. The dialect was robust enough in the 19th century to be recorded extensively in the diary of Amhlaoibh Ó Súilleabháin. The dialect's final known native speaker, Patrick Power (Pádraig de Paor) of Jamestown, Glenmore, County Kilkenny (died 1942) was recorded speaking in his native Ossory dialect, which is now housed as part of the National Folklore Collection at UCD.

== Lexicon ==
The most vital and famous source of Leinster Irish is the Cín Lae Amhlaoibh (The Diary of an Irish Countryman), a diary kept by Amhlaoibh Ó Súilleabháin between 1827 and 1835. Ó Súilleabháin lived in Callan, County Kilkenny, and recorded daily life, weather, politics, and the lives of the Catholic peasantry. Though he was born in Kerry, he was raised in Kilkenny, and his diary is written in a highly fluent, colloquial style that avoided archaic literary conventions. It provides an unmatched corpus of the vocabulary, idioms, and syntax of the Irish spoken in South Leinster just before the Famine. Unique local interrogatives were common across the province; for example, the standard cá (where) was frequently realised as gá, and cathain (when) as gathain. Additionally, the language itself was natively referred to in Dublin as Gaeilig.

Other major insights into the dialect's vocabulary come from the anglicised names of local townlands and geographic features, which preserved the phonetic pronunciation of the extinct dialect. Scholars such as Donn S. Piatt (Gaelic Dialects of Leinster) and Dáithí Ó hÓgáin (Labhrann Laighnigh) have reconstructed much of the regional vocabulary using these methods.

Some of the earliest surviving evidence of colloquial East Leinster Irish appears in the 1547 text The Fyrst Boke of the Introduction of Knowledge. Written by English physician and traveller Andrew Borde, the book preserves several records of everyday speech, such as the following examples:

English	Leinster Irish	
English	Anglicised spelling	Irish spelling
How are you?	Kanys stato?	[Conas 'tá tú?]
I am well, thank you	Tam a goomah gramahagood.	[Tá mé go maith, go raibh maith agat.]
Sir, can you speak Irish?	Sor, woll galow oket?	[Sir, 'bhfuil Gaeilig [Gaela'] agat?]
Wife, give me bread!	Benytee, toor haran!	[A bhean an tí, tabhair arán!]
How far is it to Waterford?	Gath haad o showh go part laarg?.	[Gá fhad as [a] seo go Port Láirge?]
It is one a twenty mile.	Myle hewryht.	[Míle a haon ar fhichid.]
When shall I go to sleep, wife?	Gah hon rah moyd holow?	[Gathain a rachamaoid a chodladh?]

== Phonology ==
Because the dialect is extinct, its phonology has been reconstructed by scholars such as Donn S. Piatt and Dáithí Ó hÓgáin using late-surviving speakers, historical manuscripts, audio recordings, and the phonetic spelling of anglicised placenames.

=== Consonants ===
- Broad bh and mh: In East Leinster (Dublin/Wicklow), broad bh and mh at the beginning of words were almost universally pronounced as a "v" sound. Moving into West Leinster (the Midlands), this shifted to a "w" sound.
- Slender r (r caol): A highly distinct feature of the southern Ossory dialect (Kilkenny/Carlow) was the pronunciation of the slender 'r'. It was realised as a soft "z" or "zh" sound, making the name Máire sound akin to "Ma-zsa" and boirín sound like "boosín".
- The cn cluster: Similar to Connacht Irish, both the Midlands and Old Leinster shifted the cn consonant cluster to a cr sound, making the word cnoc (hill) sound like croc.

Consonant phonemes	Labial					Coronal						Dorsal				Glottal
Consonant phonemes	Bilabial		Labio- dental		Labio- velar	Dental		Alveolar		Palato- alveolar		Palatal		Velar		Glottal
Plosive	pˠ pʲ	bˠ bʲ				t̪ˠ	d̪ˠ	tʲ	dʲ			c	ɟ	k	ɡ	
Fricative/ Approximant			fˠ fʲ	vˠ* vʲ	w*			sˠ		ʃ		ç	j	x	ɣ	h
Nasal		mˠ mʲ					n̪ˠ		nˠ nʲ		n̠ʲ		ɲ		ŋ	
Tap									ɾˠ ɾʲ**							
Lateral approximant							l̪ˠ		lˠ lʲ		l̠ʲ					
Reconstructed dialectal variations: * The chart includes both /vˠ/ and /w/ to illustrate the geographic split of broad bh/mh (East and West Leinster, respectively). ** In the southwestern Ossory dialect, the slender tap /ɾʲ/ was realized allophonically as a voiced palato-alveolar fricative [ʒ].

=== Vowels ===
Vowel chart of Leinster Irish monophthongs, showing regional variations such as the northern /æː/ and southern /ɑː/, alongside the eastern /eː/ and western /iː/

- Stress: A major dividing line in Irish dialects is word stress. In the Ossory dialect of Southwest Leinster, stress frequently fell on the second or third syllable of words ending in -ín or -óg (e.g., pronouncing cailín as /kaˈlʲiːnʲ/), mirroring Munster norms. In stark contrast, the Oriel, Midlands and Old Leinster dialects placed a strict stress on the first syllable of the word.
- The ao cluster: On the east coast, the ao vowel cluster was pronounced as an é (an /e:/ sound), whereas in the midland counties, it was pronounced as an í (/i:/).
- The á vowel: In the northern Oriel dialect, the long á shifted heavily towards an /æ:/ sound, resembling the "a" in the English word "cat", tying it to Ulster phonetics.
- Short vowels before double consonants: Unlike Munster Irish, the Old Leinster dialect did not diphthongise short vowels before double consonants. For example, the word poll (hole) rhymed with the English word "pole" rather than "towel".

== Morphology ==
=== Nouns ===
Like all Goidelic languages, Leinster Irish relied heavily on initial consonant mutations (lenition and eclipsis) to indicate grammatical case, gender, and possession. The native rural dialects retained the strict, traditional noun morphology of Early Modern Irish up until their extinction.

A prominent feature of Leinster Irish morphology was its adherence to a vigesimal numbering system (counting in base-20). The word fichid (twenty) was utilized to construct larger numbers, such as trí fichid (sixty). When counting nouns, the genitive of twenty was commonly employed between 21 and 30, such as trí ghadhar fichead (twenty-three dogs).

In addition to these structural features, localized forms of common nouns were documented across the province, such as the preference for madadh or mada over the standard madra, and the use of gasún for "boy" in East Leinster.

Leinster form	Standard form	Gloss
trí ghadhar fichead	trí mhadra is fiche	twenty-three dogs
trí fichid	seasca	sixty (lit. three twenties)
madadh, mada	madra	dog
gasún	buachaill (or gasúr)	boy
teampaill	teampall	church (pronounced "tample")

=== Verbs ===
Verb conjugation in Leinster Irish exhibited a mix of analytic and synthetic forms depending on the person and tense. In the main tenses, analytic forms (where the verb and pronoun are separate, e.g., ólann sé) were generally favoured in the singular persons. However, synthetic forms (where the pronoun is baked into the verb ending) were retained for plurals, such as chuadar (they went). For polite requests, the past subjunctive mood was frequently employed, as seen in the phrasing An ólthá deoch? (Would you drink a drink?).

The dialect also featured distinct relative forms of the verb. In North Dublin and East Leinster, the relative ending -anns was frequently used in the present tense (e.g., an fear a chualanns, "the man who hears"). Furthermore, Leinster Irish was noted for voicing the initial consonant of common interrogative forms that precede verbs, mutating the standard c into a g.

Leinster form	Standard form	Gloss
chuadar	chuadar / chuaigh siad	they went
racha muid	rachaimid	we will go
chualanns	a chloiseann	that/who hears (relative form)
an ólthá?	an n-ólfá?	would you drink? (polite request)
déanfa'	déanfaidh	will do
gá bhfuil?	cá bhfuil?	where is?
gathain?	cathain?	when?

=== Particles ===
A notable feature of morphology in Leinster Irish was the geographic divide in how speakers negated verbs. In the northern Oriel dialect (Louth and Meath), speakers frequently utilised the negative particles cha, chan, and char (e.g., chan fhuil, "is not"). This feature heavily tied the north of the province to Ulster Irish and Scots Gaelic.

However, further south in the Old Leinster and Ossory dialects, this northern particle was absent, and speakers used the standard negative particles ní and níor found in Munster and Connacht.

Additionally, in the interrogative, the standard particle cá (where) was characteristically voiced to gá across much of the province.

== Syntax ==
Leinster Irish utilized a strict Verb-subject-object word order, consistent with the rest of the Gaelic language family.

Local variations in prepositions were common. The preposition faoi (under) was typically pronounced and written as fá, and the preposition chuig (towards/to) was often replaced by gus, as in Chuaigh sé gus an mbaile (He went to the town).

Because of the region's proximity to The Pale, the later, urban Irish of Dublin and eastern Leinster sometimes exhibited English syntactic transfer errors among bilingual speakers. However, this phenomenon was isolated to areas of heavy English contact, and the rural dialects of Louth, Kilkenny, and the Midlands maintained robust Gaelic syntax.

== See also ==
- Irish language
- Ulster Irish
- Connacht Irish
- Munster Irish
- Cín Lae Amhlaoibh
