= FNG =

FNG may refer to:

- F.N.G. (album), by American crossover thrash band Suicidal Tendencies
- Fanagalo, a pidgin of southern Africa
- Faridabad-NOIDA-Ghaziabad expressway, a planned expressway in India
- Farthest neighbor graph
- Foclóir Stairiúil na Nua-Ghaeilge, the RIA's Dictionary of Modern Irish
- An Foclóir Nua Gaeilge, Foras na Gaeilge's dictionary of modern Irish
- Friends of New Germany, a defunct American pro-Nazi organization
- National Guarantees Fund (Spanish: Fondo Nacional de Garantías), an agency of the government of Colombia
- Fox Networks Group
- Fucking New Guy, a derogatory term first used by the United States military during the Vietnam War
- Fight Nights Global, a Russian mixed martial arts organization.
