= 1827 in Ireland =

- Centuries: 17th; 18th; 19th; 20th; 21st
- Decades: 1800s; 1810s; 1820s; 1830s; 1840s
- See also: 1827 in the United Kingdom; Other events of 1827; List of years in Ireland

Events from the year 1827 in Ireland.

== Events ==
- 19–25 April – public theological debates in Dublin between Revs. R. T. P. Pope (Protestant) and Thomas Maguire (Roman Catholic).
- 6 September–October – Ordnance Survey staff survey a Lough Foyle baseline for their survey of Ireland.
- 24 September (Feast of Our Lady of Mercy) – Catherine McAuley opens an institution for destitute women and orphans and a school for the poor in Dublin.
- The British Army establishes Beggars Bush Barracks.
- Clonmel and Multyfarnham Friaries are re-established.
- Amhlaoibh Ó Súilleabháin begins his diary, later published as Cín Lae Amhlaoibh.

== Arts and literature ==
- Sydney, Lady Morgan, publishes her romantic novel with political overtones, The O'Briens and the O'Flahertys, in London.

== Births ==
- January – Bernard Diamond, soldier, recipient of the Victoria Cross for gallantry in 1857 at Bolandshahr, India (died 1892).
- 5 February – Peter Lalor, leader of the Eureka Stockade rebellion in Australia (died 1889).
- 27 April – Mary Ward, scientist (died 1869).
- 5 May – Thomas Francis Hendricken, first Bishop of Providence, Rhode Island (died 1886).
- 29 May – Timothy Daniel Sullivan, journalist, politician and poet, writer of the Irish national hymn God Save Ireland (died 1914).
- 3 September – John Drew, actor in the United States (died 1862).
- 10 December – Eugene O'Keefe, businessman and philanthropist in Canada (died 1913).
  Full date unknown
  - Thomas Farrell, sculptor (died 1900).
  - James Owens, soldier, recipient of the Victoria Cross for gallantry in 1854 at Sebastopol, in the Crimea (died 1901).

== Deaths ==
- 14 November – Thomas Addis Emmet, lawyer and politician, member of United Irishmen (born 1764).

== See also ==
- 1827 in Scotland
- 1827 in Wales
