= Irish lexicography =

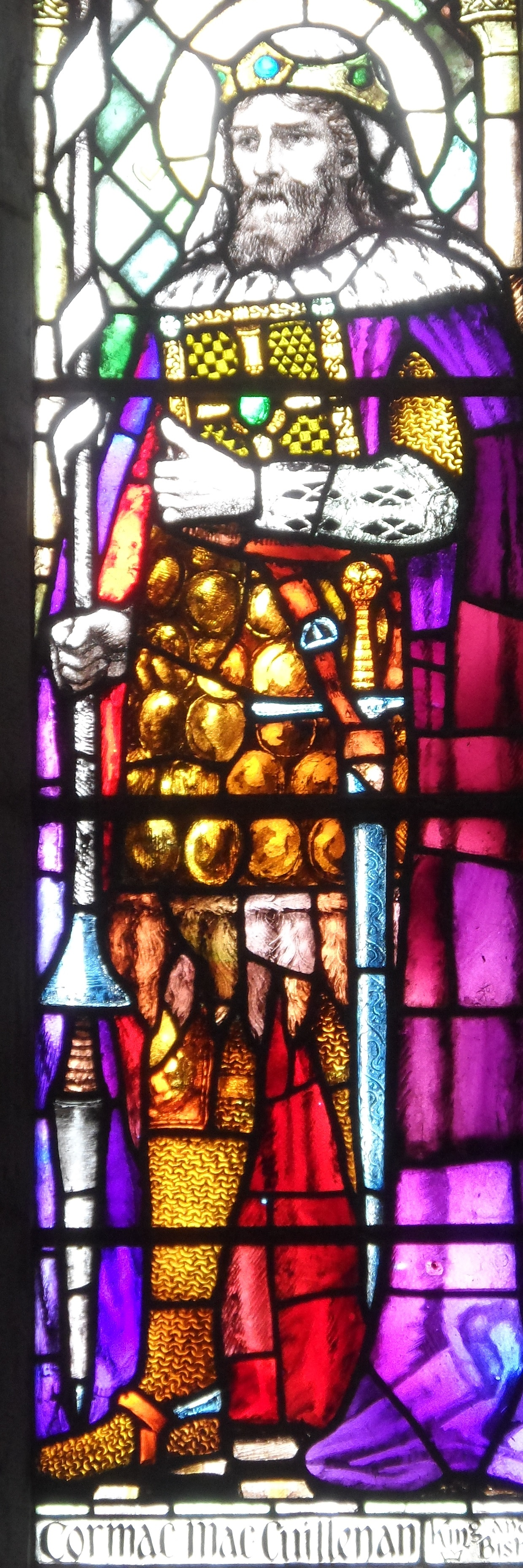
King Cormac Mac Cuileannáin of Munster, who died in 908 AD. He is credited with Sanas Cormaic (Cormac's Glossary).

Lexicography evolved in order to serve one of two needs i.e. in order to explain in a simple way difficult words and expressions or in order to explain the words and expressions of one language in another. In this case we can trace the tradition of lexicography in Irish back to the 8th century.

== Würzburg ==
Around 750 A.D. an anonymous Irish student studying in Würzburg in Germany, wrote down explanations in his native tongue on the Latin text of the Epistles of Saint Paul as an aid to help him understand the Latin. The text and explanations still survive in Würzburg. This is the earliest known attempt at bilingual lexicography in Irish. Lexicography of various kinds has been practised in Irish from that time down to our own day – a journey of about 1,250 years.

== Cormac ==
The first dictionaries compiled in Irish independent of an accompanying text are described as Glossaries. It is most likely that these were put together from glosses already appended to other texts. Sanas Cormaic (Cormac's Glossary) is the most famous of these and was compiled over one thousand years ago. It was compiled by Cormac Mac Cuileannáin, the Bishop of Cashel and king of Munster, who died in 908. It is an encyclopaedic dictionary containing simple synonymous explanations in Irish or Latin of the headwords. In some cases he attempts to give the etymology of the words and in others he concentrates on an encyclopaedic entry. It is held to be the first linguistic dictionary in any of the non-classical languages of Europe.

== Ó Cléirigh ==
Mícheál Ó Cléirigh was a Franciscan and head of the Four Masters. He compiled another famous glossary called ‘Sanasán Mhichíl Uí Chléirigh’ (Michael O'Clery's Glossary). This glossary was printed in 1643 during the author's lifetime. These two glossaries and others are valuable for the etymological and encyclopaedic information contained in them. They are of equal value for their explanations of difficult words and because they contain words for which there is no evidence to be had apart from the spoken language of the present day.

== Plunkett ==
In 1662 Richard Plunkett, a Franciscan living in Trim, Co. Meath, finished the first great bilingual dictionary containing the Irish language, his Latin-Irish Dictionary. The manuscript was never published and is now held in Marsh's Library in Dublin. Despite this fact, subsequent lexicographers made copious use of this work.

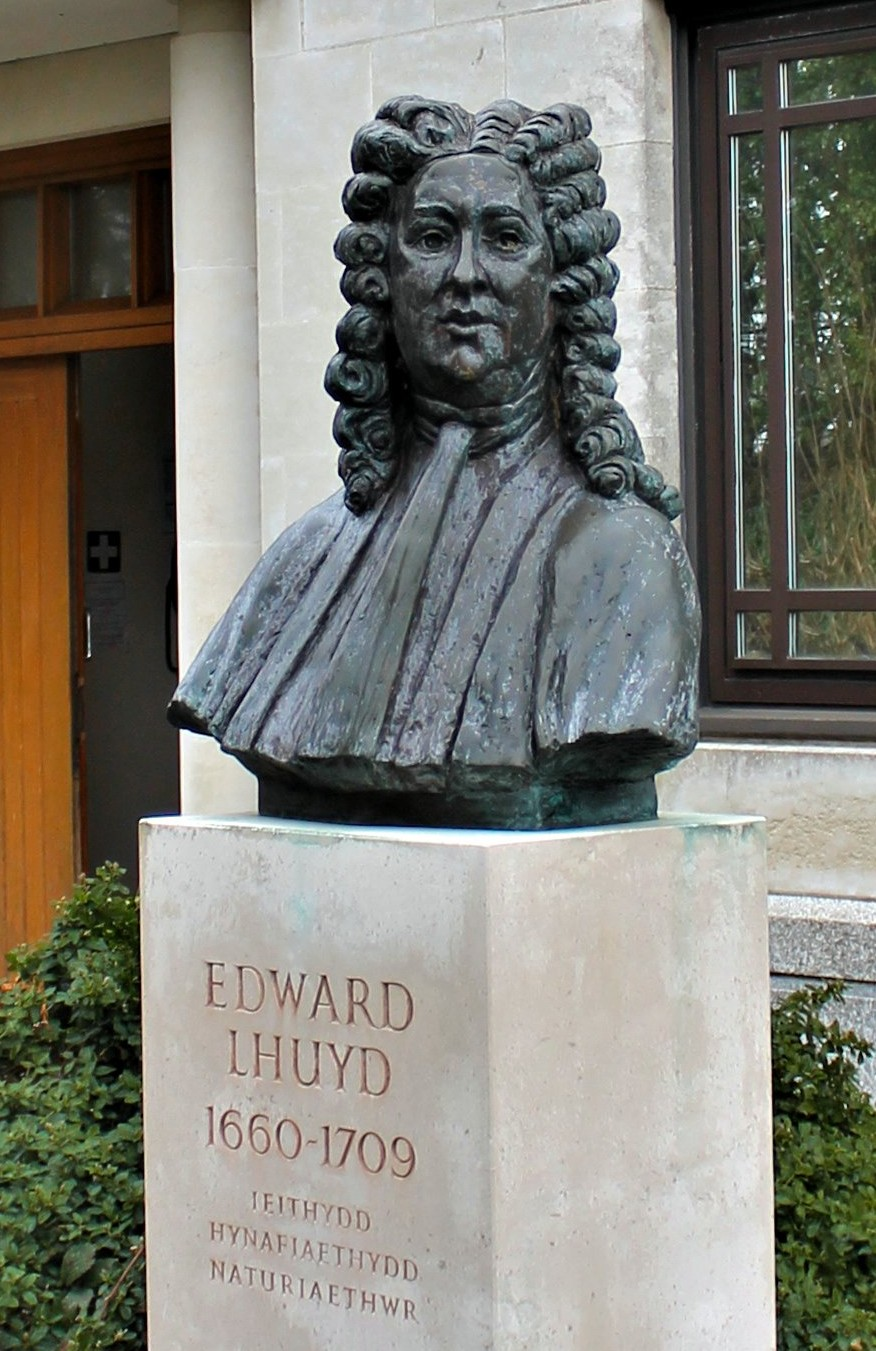
Edward Lhwyd, Welsh lexicographer considered to be "the first Celtic scholar"

== 18th century ==
Edward Lhuyd, a Welsh speaker was one of the first to make good use of Plunkett's dictionary, in the dictionary of multilingual lists (encompassing the Celtic languages, Latin and English) which he published in 1707. During the 18th century two major English-Irish dictionaries and two Irish-English dictionaries were compiled. In Paris in 1732 the first comprehensive English-Irish dictionary was published and in the same city in 1768 a similar Irish-English work was published. Conchubhar Ó Beaglaoich, a priest and private tutor in Paris and Aodh Buí Mac Cruitín, a scholar from Co. Clare compiled the 1732 dictionary. Seán Ó Briain, bishop of Cloyne and Ross was the compiler or the 1768 dictionary. Francis Walsh and Tadhg Ó Neachtain’s Irish-English Dictionary (1739) and Crab's English-Irish dictionary remained in manuscript form and were never published.

== 19th century ==
During the 19th century three English-Irish dictionaries and the same number of Irish-English dictionaries were compiled. Four of these were published, Tadhg Ó Coinnialláin’s English-Irish dictionary(1814), that produced by Domhnall Ó Foghludha (1855), Edward O'Reilly’s Irish-English dictionary (1817, 1821, 1864) and that compiled by Thomas de Vere Coneys (1849). Clareman, Peadar Ó Conaill’s Irish-English dictionary and Robert MacAdam’s English-Irish Dictionary (c. 1850) remain in manuscript form. MacAdam was a business man from Belfast, a Protestant and Irish revivalist.

== 20th century ==
P. S. Dinneen's dictionary Foclóir Gaedhilge agus Béarla, 1904

The 20th century witnessed the compilation of the first major Irish-Irish dictionary for centuries: Croidhe Cainnte Chiarraighe, by Seán Óg Mac Murchadha Caomhánach (a.k.a. Seán a' Chóta). Although originally intended to comprise mainly words particular to the Dingle dialect of Irish, it quickly outgrew its specification, swelling to over 60,000 headwords and over 2.2 million words in total. While this greatly added to its usefulness as a comprehensive dictionary for speakers of the Irish language, in a sad irony it was also the costs associated with this size that eventually resulted in its not being published during Seán a' Chóta's lifetime. It was over seventy five years after its completion before it was made accessible by the general public thanks to the work of Dr Tracey Ní Mhaonaigh of Maynooth University, who transcribed it.

During the 20th century four English-Irish dictionaries were published and three major Irish-English dictionaries. The English-Irish dictionaries were produced by Edmund Fournier d’Albe (1903), Timothy O'Neill Lane (1904, 1918), Lambert McKenna (1935) and Tomás de Bhaldraithe (1959). The Irish-English dictionaries included Dinneen’s famous work (1904, 1927) also Contributions to a Dictionary of the Irish Language (1913–76) published by the Royal Irish Academy, which was a reference work of Old and Middle Irish, and Ó Dónaill’s Foclóir Gaeilge-Béarla (1977). A considerable number of terminological dictionaries, dictionaries relating to specific dialects, dictionaries for school use and pocket dictionaries were also published in the last century. Two dictionaries were also produced containing Irish and a language other than English for the first time since Plunkett's dictionary in the 17th century. These were Risteárd de Hae’s Irish-French dictionary (1952) and the Irish-Breton dictionary compiled by Loeiz Andouard agus Éamon Ó Ciosáin (1987).

== 21st century ==
The diversification of Irish lexicography has continued since the turn of the century, with an Irish-Spanish dictionary published by Coiscéim, an Irish-German dictionary published by Buske and an online Irish-Russian dictionary has been created by Alexey Shibakov, bringing the number of major European languages provided for to five. Meanwhile, of the other living Celtic languages the only one without an Irish dictionary is now Cornish thanks to the work of Kevin Scannell in creating dictionaries for the other Gaelic languages and of Joe Mitchell who has created a Welsh-Irish dictionary.

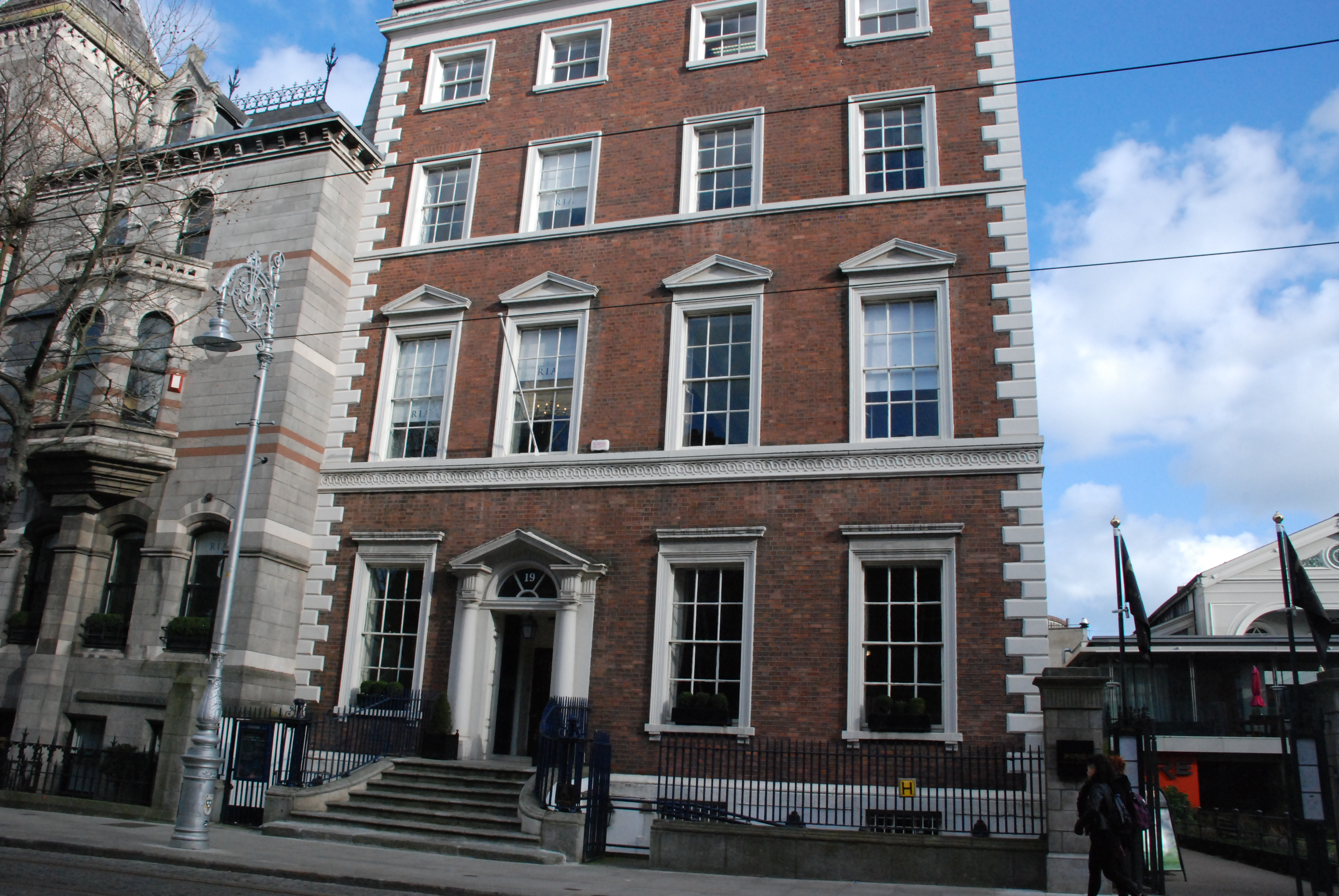
Headquarters of the RIA, which is engaged in long-running lexicographical projects.

The internet has notably become a far greater medium for dictionaries since the turn of the century. Ó Dónaill and de Bhaldraithe's bilingual dictionaries and the monolingual Foclóir Beag can be searched for free online and Foras na Gaeilge's New English-Irish Dictionary is available exclusively electronically, as is the national terminology database provided by Fiontar in DCU. Intergaelic, a resource for speakers of Gaelic languages is provided by Kevin Scannell and Michal Boleslav Měchura. The Royal Irish Academy also republished their comprehensive dictionary of early Irish online as the eDIL and work is ongoing on a comprehensive historical dictionary of Irish covering the period 1600-2000.

The lexicographers who practiced lexicography in Irish were for the most part learned men who had a particular love for Irish. The methodologies employed by most of them remain unknown to us. They had no hesitancy, however, in borrowing from dictionaries that already existed. This point has been shown with no little humour in many articles written by one of the lexicographers of the 20th century, Tomás de Bhaldraithe. In general their research and use of pre-existing sources increased the value and scope of their work. They sometimes erred in selection of specific word versions which they gleaned from their sources, however. On other occasions one cannot be sure that it is not without a degree of humour that they chose to include certain comical versions. It is not clear whether ignorance or wit was responsible for the following examples from some of the aforementioned works – “giolla earbuill, a page or train-bearer”; “lachaim, I duck or dive”; “calaoiseach, a juggler”; “bol, a poet; a cow”. When in future appointing a dictionary editor perhaps the job description should state that a “siollaire” is required – “siollaire, a scanner of every word, a carper, a dictator; a beater, striker, smiter, a dexterous harper also a good singer; siollaire mná, a strong comely woman” – those are the descriptions found in some of the dictionaries for a person deemed a “siollaire”. It will be interesting to note how the word “siollaire will be employed by those lexicographers who come after us. In any case the journey of over one thousand two hundred years travelled by Irish lexicography from the glossist of Würzburg to the new Foras na Gaeilge dictionary is one of which we can be justifiably proud.
