= Dictionary of the Irish Language =

Dictionary

Dictionary of the Irish Language: Based Mainly on Old and Middle Irish Materials (also called "the DIL"), published by the Royal Irish Academy, is the definitive dictionary of the origins of the Irish language, specifically the Old Irish, Middle Irish, and Early Modern Irish stages up to c. 1700; the modern language is not included. The original idea for a comprehensive dictionary of early Irish was conceived in 1852 by the two pre-eminent Irish linguists of the time, John O'Donovan and Eugene O'Curry; however, it was more than sixty years until the first fascicle (the letter D as far as the word degóir, compiled by Carl J. S. Marstrander) was published in 1913. It was more than sixty years again until the final fascicle (only one page long and consisting of words beginning with H) was published in 1976 under the editorship of E. G. Quin.

The full dictionary comprises about 2500 pages, but a compact edition (four original pages photoreduced onto one page) was published in 1983 (ISBN 0-901714-29-1), and the decision was made to discontinue printing the full-size edition.

== eDIL ==
A web site has been established to permit scholars to submit annotations for the DIL.

As a result of a project started in 2003, the online edition, known as the electronic Dictionary of the Irish Language (or eDIL), was launched in the Royal Irish Academy on 27 June 2007. The launch was organised by the Foclóir na Nua-Ghaeilge team in the academy.

== See also ==
- Droichead DIL
- Foclóir Stairiúil na Nua-Ghaeilge
- Irish lexicography
