= An Foclóir Nua Gaeilge =

Dictionary of the Irish language

- Edited by: Pádraig Ó Mianáin
- Country: Ireland
- Language: Irish
- Publisher: Foras na Gaeilge
- Published: 2025 (initial release)
- Website: www.focloir.ie

An Foclóir Nua Gaeilge is an online dictionary of contemporary Irish, available to search for free on Focloir.ie [ga]. It is an ordinary explanatory dictionary in that headwords in Irish are explained in the same language. Its compilation by Foras na Gaeilge's lexicography team is ongoing. The initial release in December 2025 provided users with access to an estimated 50-60% of the content the project plans to have created by its conclusion.

== See also ==
- Foclóir Stairiúil na Nua-Ghaeilge
- Croidhe Cainnte Chiarraighe [ga]
- Foclóir Mháirtín Uí Chadhain [ga]
- Irish lexicography
