= Ballinagree =

Village in County Cork, Ireland

Ballinagree Baile na Graí
- Village
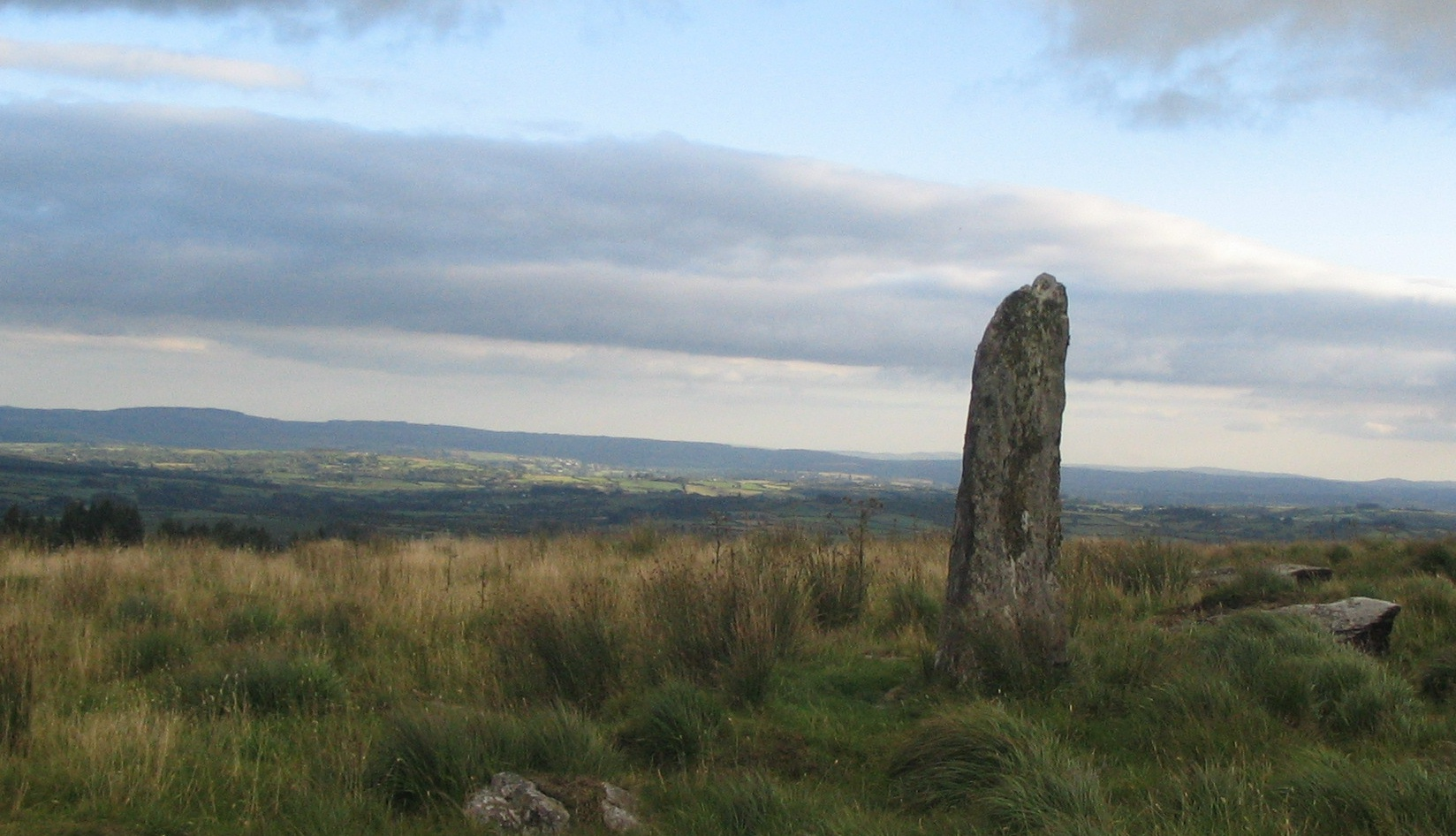
- Standing stone located between Millstreet and Ballinagree

- Location in Ireland
- Coordinates: 51°58′37″N 8°55′30″W
- Country: Ireland
- Province: Munster
- County: County Cork
- Time zone: UTC+0 (WET)
  - Summer (DST): UTC-1 (IST (WEST))
- In the Roman Catholic Diocese of Cloyne (Aghinagh)

Ballinagree (Irish: Baile na Graí), sometimes Ballynagree, is a small village situated at the foot of the Boggeragh Mountains in County Cork, Ireland. It is located in Roman Catholic Diocese of Cloyne, in the parish of Aghinagh, which also contains Rusheen, Bealnamorive and parts of Carrigadrohid. Ballinagree is part of the Dáil constituency of Cork North-West.

The area around Ballinagree contains a large number of Megalithic monuments. It is located 18 miles (29 km) west of Cork city, 10 km north east of Macroom, 6 km west of Rylane, 13 km north west of Coachford, 17 km south east of Millstreet and 20 km west of Blarney.

In the late 1990s and early 2000s, a number of housing estates were developed, but the properties were not sold; leaving the village with so-called "ghost estates".

The area is known as the residence of the subject of the Irish folk song "Thady Quill".
