= Johnny Tom Gleeson =

Johnny Tom Gleeson (1853–1924) was an Irish poet and songwriter. He wrote the ballad "The Bould Thady Quill" (c.1895), a spoof on a non-athlete, and two other noted poems: "The Battle Ship Sinn Féin" (c.1905), his only patriotic piece, and "The Wild Bar-A-Boo" (c.1910), spoofing the noted Muskerry fox chase that originated in Ballincollig and passed through his townland near Rylane, County Cork. He wrote many more poems of little consequence, mostly spoofing his neighbors and acquaintances.

== Biography ==
=== Early life and education ===
John ("Johnny Tom") Gleeson was born 26 July 1853 in Rylane to a farmer, Thomas Gleeson (1795-1871), and his wife Mary Golden (? - c.1910). Mary was the aunt of another famous Corkman, Peter Golden (1877-1926): author, actor, poet and patriot. . While most of the Gleesons were poets, Johnny had a double advantage as his mother (Golden) was also a poet and a woman of considerable learning. Mary was also related to Terence MacSwiney (1879-1920), the martyred Lord-Mayor of Cork. Her brother conducted a "Latin" school in Macroom and among his pupils was An tAthair Peadar.

In his youth, Johnny Tom apparently took little interest in sports, hunting, or farming, being more interested in reading, music, and socializing. He grew to be around 5'-8" tall. This broad-shouldered, handsome man with brown eyes and light brown hair stood out in any crowd. At age 17, he became the man of the house, which did not suit his sedentary inclinations. Johnny Tom, trying to follow in his brother's priestly footsteps, reportedly enrolled in a seminary, but for some reason, possibly the regimented life, he returned to his family's farm.

=== Career ===
Although having little desire or knack for running a farm, he did half-heartedly give it a try. In his mid-years, apparently he hired help and share-cropped his farm. In later years he neglected the farm totally, letting the cattle and his house shift for themselves and letting his fields deteriorate. His farm was known as the "Wild West." Johnny Tom was known as being tight-fisted with his money, never paying his bills on time. He was also quick to borrow tools, but slow to return them. Whenever he needed money, he would wander out into the fields hopefully to find a young cow, lamb, or foal he could sell.

Obviously, Johnny Tom's talents lay elsewhere than farming. Not only could he compose poetry as fast as he could talk, but he was a very accomplished musician, playing both the accordion and the flute. He also had a very pleasant tenor voice. In this regard, Johnny Tom was more noted for his lilting or "dideling" (i.e., the rapid "di-diddle-dee-dee" approach to singing). These musical talents allowed him to set several of his poems to music. His musical and poetic talents were in demand at every local social gathering. Johnny Tom played and sang at set-dances in the vale below his uncle David Gleeson's house. This same vale was on the route of the noted Muskerry fox chase, which Johnny Tom immortalized in his ballad "The Wild Bar-A-Boo." None of Johnny Tom's known poems ever speak of romance, loves lost, or idyllic women. He never married. Most of his poems and ballads were satirical or remembrances of people and events.

Johnny Tom was quiet and gentle, but set in his ways. He was eccentric in many ways: Johnny Tom always carried a bill-hook (hook-shaped knife) with him; he used it for shaving, cutting tobacco, skinning animals, cutting bread, and other needs. He kept all his victuals in a large, iron pot. With its lid turned upside down, he also used it as stool. In later life at least, he slept with his clothes on. Because his featherbed was torn, he was always covered in feathers. He was also never seen without a bowler hat.

=== Death ===
About two months before his death, in failing health, Johnny Tom sold his farm and moved in with Paddy (c.1878 - c.1925) and Lena (c.1870 - c.1933) Corkery, his neighbors. Paddy and Johnny Tom were related through the Golden line. The Corkerys' daughter, Hanna Maria (1904 – 1989) and Mrs. Corkery nursed Johnny Tom until his death on 21 July 1924. He died of heart failure in the Corkery's settle bed. His last words were to Hanna Maria, asking her for a glass of water.

On Sunday, 16 August 1970, a plaque was unveiled by a group of Cork dignitaries to mark the grave of Johnny Tom near the wall outside South Kilmurry Church.

He is buried in Aghabullogue graveyard.
