= John M. Feehan =

Irish writer

John M. Feehan (8 September 1916 – 25 May 1991) was an Irish author and publisher. The eldest son of a schoolmaster, Feehan was born in Dualla, County Tipperary.

== Early life and career ==
He entered secondary schooling at Rockwell College and later attended University College Galway.

Feehan joined the Irish Army and reached the rank of captain before resigning in 1945. He had four children. He founded the successful Cork-based publishing house Mercier Press in 1944 and served as its managing director. In 1946, he published This Tremendous Lover by Dom Eugene Boylan which sold over a million copies. At the Frankfurt Book Fair he secured the translation rights of German books on philosophy and religion that sold well. In the 1960s he launched a successful range of paperbacks on Irish literature, culture, religion and history.

== Writing ==
In 1972, Feehan wrote Tomorrow To Be Brave which recounted his wife’s life and death by cancer. He explored Ireland on foot and by boat, writing a number of books.

He appeared as himself in the made-for-TV documentary on Michael Collins, The Shadow of Beal na blath (1991).

Feehan died in Cork on 25 May 1991 of an apparent heart attack at the age of 74.

== Selected bibliography ==
- My Village - My World, foreword by John B. Keane. Mercier Press, c1992.
- An Apology to the Irish people Royal Carbery Books : Trade distributor, Mercier Press, c1988.
- The Secret Places of the Burren Royal Carbery Books, c1987.
- The Secret Places of the Shannon
- The Secret Places of Donegal
- The Statesman - a Study of the Role of Charles J Haughey in the Ireland of Tomorrow Mercier Press, c1985.
- Operation Brogue : A Study of the Vilification of Charles Haughey. Mercier Press, 1984. ISBN 0853427291.
- Bobby Sands and the Tragedy of Northern Ireland Mercier Press, c1983. ISBN 0932966659.
- The Shooting of Michael Collins: Murder or Accident Mercier Press, c1981. ISBN 0946645035.
- Fifty Years Young: A Tribute to John B. Keane Mercier Press, c1979.
- The Magic of the Kerry Coast Mercier Press, 1979. ISBN 0853425841.
- The Wind that Round the Fastnet Sweeps Mercier Press, 1978. Subsequently, under the title:
  The Secret Places of the West Cork Coast.
- Tomorrow To Be Brave Mercier Press, 1972. ISBN 0853423008.
  This is the story of a remarkable and wonderful woman, who knew she was going to die a lingering and painful death but who faced up to it with unbelievable courage and who turned her last terrible years on this earth into the greatest years of her life - years of kindness, patience, understanding and unselfishness.
- An Irish Publisher and His World Mercier Press, c1969.

== Filmography ==
- The Shadow of Beal na blath (1991) (TV) (as Capt. John M. Feehan) .... Himself (author).
