= Kevin Scannell =

American linguist

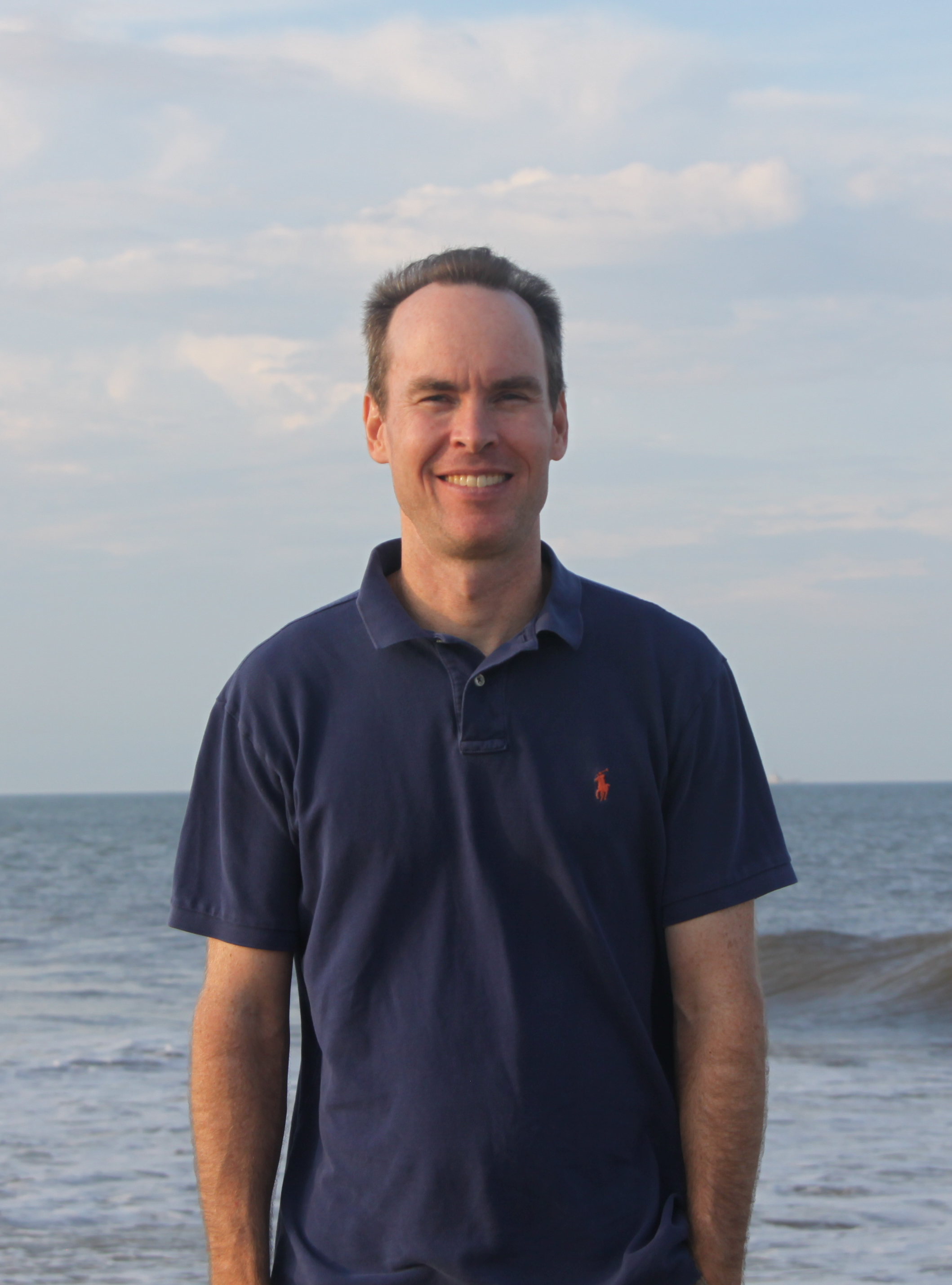
- Born: 11 May 1970; Boston
- Awards: Fulbright Program (2020)
- Website: kevinscannell.com
- Academic career
- Institutions: Saint Louis University (1998–)
- Doctoral advisor: Geoffrey Mess

Kevin Scannell (Irish: Caoimhín Ó Scanaill; born 11 May 1970) is an American professor of mathematics and computer science at Saint Louis University.

== Career ==
Kevin Scannell is the professor of mathematics and computer science at Saint Louis University. His work focuses on developing online computing resources for small, minority or under-resourced languages, with a particular interest in Irish and other Celtic languages. He has developed an Irish thesaurus, grammar checker, and spell checker, and dictionaries and translation engines for Irish, Scottish, and Manx Gaelics. Scannell is a member of the team which localises platforms including Gmail, Twitter and WhatsApp into Irish. He founded Indigenous Tweets in 2011 to promote the use of social media through indigenous and minority languages. He translated 20 hours worth of coding material into Irish for the Hour of Code in 2016. In 2019 he created an Irish language name generator called Gaelaigh mé.

In 2019, he won a Fulbright Scholarship working on developing language technologies for Irish using deep learning and neural networks in collaboration with researchers at Acadamh na hOllscolaíochta Gaeilge in Carna, County Galway.

He is active in developing the Irish-language Wikipedia, and adding Irish content to Wikidata.

== Personal life ==
Scannell was born on 11 May 1970 in Boston, Massachusetts. He graduated from Massachusetts Institute of Technology (MIT) with a BS in 1991. In 1996 he was awarded his doctorate from University of California, Los Angeles. He started learning Irish in the 1990s.
