= Tomás de Bhaldraithe =

Irish scholar (1916–1996)

- Born: 14 December 1916; Ballincurra, County Limerick
- Died: 24 April 1996 (aged 79); Dublin
- Spouse: Vivienne Ní Thoirdhealbhaigh (m. 1943)
- Children: 9

Tomás Mac Donnchadha de Bhaldraithe (born Thomas MacDonagh Waldron; 14 December 1916 – 24 April 1996) was an Irish scholar notable for his work on the Irish language, particularly in the field of lexicography. He is best known for his English-Irish Dictionary, published in 1959.

== Biography ==
Tomás de Bhaldraithe was born on 14 December 1916 in Ballincurra, County Limerick. He moved to Dublin with his family at the age of five. He was named after Thomas MacDonagh one of the signatories of the Proclamation of the Irish Republic, who had been executed after the Easter Rising earlier that year. He adopted the use of the Irish language version of the name in both Irish and English. He received his second-level education at Belvedere College in Dublin.

His stance on standard forms and spellings was supported by Éamon de Valera despite opposition from traditionalists in the Department of Education, and the work is widely seen as an important benchmark in Irish scholarship.

In 1942, he was appointed a professor at the Dublin Institute for Advanced Studies in the department of Celtic Studies. In 1960 he was appointed professor of modern Irish language and literature in University College Dublin, where he developed an impressive archive of material on Irish dialects. Much of the material in this archive was later used as the basis of Niall Ó Dónaill's Foclóir Gaeilge-Béarla, published in 1978, for which he was consulting editor. Also during the 1970s, de Bhaldraithe translated the Irish language diary of Amhlaoibh Ó Súilleabháin into English. It was then published by Mercier Press as "The Diary of an Irish Countryman."

The language laboratory which he set up in UCD was the first of its kind in any university in Ireland. His interest in seanchas (folklore) led to his publication of Seanchas Thomáis Laighléis in 1977, while his earlier work includes the ground-breaking study of the Cois Fharraige dialect (a variety of Connacht Irish), Gaeilge Chois Fharraige: Deilbhíocht. In later years he worked extensively on the definitive Irish dictionary, Foclóir na Nua-Ghaeilge, which remained unfinished when he died in 1996, but which is still in progress today.
