= Maurice Gaffney =

Irish barrister

- Born: 11 October 1916; County Meath, Ireland
- Died: 3 November 2016 (aged 100); St. Vincent's University Hospital, Dublin, Ireland
- Occupation: Barrister
- Years active: 1954-2016
- Known for: Oldest practicing lawyer in Ireland at time of his death

Maurice Gaffney, S.C. (11 October 1916 – 3 November 2016) was an Irish barrister, who at his death at 100, was the oldest practicing barrister in Ireland.

Gaffney was born in County Meath to a Royal Irish Constabulary member. He moved to Dublin with his family following events after the 1916 Easter Rising. He initially found employment as a teacher, before becoming a practising member of the Law Library. He was called to the bar in 1954, and promoted to Senior Counsel in 1970. During the 1980s, he was involved in DPP v O'Shea, a landmark case in Irish jurisprudence in which Gaffney successfully argued that a jury's decision can be overturned. In 1996, he was involved in Fianna Fáil's Des Hanafin's attempt to overturn the historic divorce laws that came into force the previous year. He considered himself an expert on railway law.

He continued to practise law into the 21st century. In 2014, he was awarded a lifetime achievement award at the Irish Law Awards. He continued appearing before the High Court and Supreme Court in 2015. The following year, he said he had no plans to retire and would continue working for as long as possible, saying "it keeps me alive".

Gaffney, who lived in Monkstown, Dublin, was admitted to St. Vincent's Hospital and died aged 100 on 3 November 2016. The chairman of the Bar Council of Ireland, Paul McGarry, praised Gaffney's work and his track record of constitutional and criminal law. He was married to Leonie Gaffney and had two children.
