= Rylane =

Village in County Cork, Ireland

Rylane Reighleán an Rince
- Village
- Location in Ireland
- Coordinates: 51°59′02″N 08°50′27″W
- Country: Ireland
- Province: Munster
- County: County Cork
- Elevation: 635.24 ft (193.621 m)
- Time zone: UTC+0 (WET)
  - Summer (DST): UTC-1 (IST (WEST))
- Eircode (Routing Key): P32
- Irish Grid Reference: W432811

Rylane Cross (Irish: Reighleán an Rince) is a village in County Cork, Ireland. The town is situated roughly midway between Millstreet and Cork city, north of Macroom in the parish of Aghabullogue.

== Ringfort ==
A ringfort was depicted on 1842 and 1904 OS 6-inch maps as hachured circular enclosure (diam. c. 40m), truncated on the northeast side by roadway, with external fosse (ENE->N) shown on 1904 OS 6-inch map; on 1938 OS 6-inch map as hachured raised area (diam. c. 40m) with external fosse, entrance to the southeast. Two ramparts with intermediate fosse and entrance to the southeast (Width 24 feet) were recorded by Hartnett (1939, 85). According to local information leveled late 1970s.

== Transport ==
Rylane is served by a single Bus Éireann bus service daily, which is timed to get commuters and school children into Cork in the morning and back in the evening. There is also a twice-weekly bus service to Macroom. The nearest railway station is Millstreet railway station on the Mallow–Tralee line, 20 km away.

== People ==
- Derek Blighe (born 1980), anti-immigration activist
- Johnny Tom Gleeson (1853–1924), Irish poet and songwriter who wrote the ballad "The Bould Thady Quill" (c.1895), was born in Rylane.

== See also ==
- List of towns and villages in Ireland
