= Thady Quill =

Popular traditional Irish song

"Thady Quill" (or "Bold Thady Quill") is a popular traditional Irish song. The song was written about a man living in County Cork, depicting him "as a beer-swilling, lady-loving sportsman" when he was actually none of those things. Recordings include The Clancy Brothers on their album Come Fill Your Glass with Us.

== Composer ==
The ballad "The Bould Thady Quill" was composed by Johnny Tom Gleeson around 1895 and first put to paper in 1905. Gleeson (1853–1924) was a farmer who lived near Rylane, County Cork. He fancied himself a poet/balladeer, lampooning many of his neighbors and acquaintances.

== Subject ==
Timothy "Thady" Quill (c.1860–1932) was a poor laborer and occasional cattle jobber, who, owning no land nor house, did odd-jobs for the local farmers. Thady, although a burly man, was no athlete, apparently teetotal, while sleeping in barns did not endear him to the ladies—he died a bachelor. Johnny Tom Gleeson engaged Thady as a labourer. However, instead of paying him, he "immortalized" Thady with this ballad, which pleased Thady no end.

== Published versions ==
A version of the ballad with music was published in "Soodlum's Irish Ballad Book" by Oak Publications, London, England, 1982, and another in "Comic Songs of Cork and Kerry" by James N. Healy, published by Mercier Press, 1978.
