= William Crozier (cricketer) =

Irish cricketer (1873–1916)

Personal information
- Full name: William Magee Crozier
- Born: 5 December 1873; Dundrum, Ireland
- Died: 1 July 1916 (aged 42); Thiepval, Somme, France
- Batting: Right-handed
- Bowling: Unknown

Domestic team information
- Years: Team
- 1895: Dublin University

Career statistics
Competition	First-class
Matches	1
Runs scored	7
Batting average	3.50
100s/50s	–/–
Top score	4
Balls bowled	75
Wickets	0
Bowling average	–
5 wickets in innings	–
10 wickets in match	–
Best bowling	–
Catches/stumpings	–/–
- Source: Cricinfo, 10 January 2022

William Magee Crozier (5 December 1873 in Dublin, Ireland – 1 July 1916 in Thiepval, France) was an Irish cricketer. A right-handed batsman, he played one first-class match for Dublin University against Leicestershire in June 1895.

He was a barrister by profession who served as a Lieutenant in the 9th battalion of the Royal Inniskilling Fusiliers and was killed in action on the first day on the Somme during the First World War.
