= Cín Lae Amhlaoibh =

Diary written by Amhlaoibh Ó Súilleabháin

The Diary of an Irish Countryman
- Author: Amhlaoibh Ó Súilleabháin
- Original title: Cín Lae Amhlaoibh
- Translator: Tomás De Bhaldraithe
- Language: Irish
- Subject: Irish Life
- Genre: Diary
- Set in: Ireland
- Published: 1936-1937
- Publication place: Ireland
- English publication date: 1979
- ISBN: 0717105121
- OCLC: 562138676

Cín Lae Amhlaoibh is a diary written by Amhlaoibh Ó Súilleabháin (1780–1837) between the years 1827 to 1835.

It is invaluable for the insight it gives into life in rural Ireland in the early 19th century, and is a rare example of an early modern diary written in the Irish language. Amhlaoibh's original manuscript is currently in the possession of the Royal Irish Academy.

== Author ==
Amhlaoibh Ó Súilleabháin (May 1780 – 1838), also known as "Humphrey O'Sullivan", kept a diary which was later published as Cín Lae Amhlaoibh. He was involved in Daniel O'Connell's Catholic Emancipation movement and the lives of the poor in County Kilkenny. He and his father, Donncha Ó Súilleabháin, established themselves as teachers in Callan and the surrounding towns.

Though he was clearly a master of English, his diary is mostly in Irish. His diary shows him to have had a deep interest in the natural world, and there are daily references to the weather. He mostly eschewed the archaisms favoured by other writers in Irish, writing in a fluent, flexible, colloquial style which could encompass both concision and literary elaboration.

== Manuscript ==
Amhlaoibh's original manuscript is currently in the possession of the Royal Irish Academy. An edition of the complete manuscript was published as Cinnlae Amhlaoibh Uí Shúileabháin by M. McGrath in 1936-37 and an abridged and annotated edition (Cín Lae Amhlaoibh) by Tomás de Bhaldraithe in 1970–1973. A translation (The Diary of an Irish Countryman) was published by de Bhaldraithe (Mercier Press) in 1979.

It remains one of the most important sources for 19th-century Irish life and one of the few surviving works from the perspective of the Roman Catholic lower and middle classes.

== Quotes (translated) ==
"27 June 1827

...I saw two water wagtails hopping and flitting within a yard fried chicken of a cat which was crossing the road. They were noisily mocking the cat, which kept glancing from one side to the other at them. The poor man does the same to the tyrant when he gets the opportunity – just as the birds do to the cat."

"29 June 1827

...Feast of Saint Peter and Paul.

A holiday... Hurling on the Fair Green. It was a good game. The sticks were being brandished like swords. Hurling is a war-like game. The west side won the first match and the east the second. You could hear the sticks striking the ball from one end of the Green to the other. I was watching from the top end myself with Doctor Céatinn and two priests. The well-to-do young men and women were strolling up and down the Green and on the level causeway in the center."

"16 August 1827

...At ten o'clock this morning my mother Máire Ní Bhuachalla Ní Shúilleabháin, wife of Donncha Ó Súilleabháin, died after receiving Extreme Unction by the Grace of Almighty God. She was close to eighty years of age. Her husband, my father, died in the Year of Christ 1808, the year of the big snow. He was buried in Cill Bhríde, beside Áth an Iúir a mile from Callan, although his family's burial place is Iríolach Monastery at Mucros beside Loch Léin in Killarney, County Kerry. But the pressures of life sent us a long way from our people, sixteen and twenty years ago...

Small boys and girls are coming home with little bundles of gleanings."

"February 3, 1828 ...There is a lonely path near Uisce Dun and Móinteán na Cisi which is called the Mass Boreen. The name comes from the time when the Catholic Church was persecuted in Ireland, and Mass had to be said in woods and on moors, on wattled places in bogs, and in caves. But as the proverb says, It is better to look forward with one eye than to look backwards with two..."

"8 May 1830 ...There is a large cave in Baile na Síg, two miles west of Callan, which is called 'The Rapparee's Hole.' It seems they used to hide there after Cromwell's and King William's time. It's many the fine, good, honest man who had been reared in luxury and happiness who was reduced to robbery, begging, or exile by those two Englishmen."

"September 11, 1830 ...Last Thursday in Dublin Castle I heard a band playing music which was like the music of Devils. The bassoons were like a sow crooning to her young. The musical pipe sounded like the squealing of piglets. The flute sounded like a muffled fart, the trumpets and French horns sounded like the laughter of fiends and the serpent like the sighing of demons, the trombone like the harsh cry of the heron. It wasn't soft like the lovenote of the heron. The clarinets were like the cry of the plover and the corncrake. It in no way resembled the sweet, gently moving music of the Irish."
