= Foclóir Stairiúil na Nua-Ghaeilge =

== About Foclóir Stairiúil na Nua-Ghaeilge ==
The Foclóir Stairiúil na Nua-Ghaeilge (Irish pronunciation: [ˈfˠɔklˠoːɾʲ ˈsˠt̪ˠaɾʲuːlʲ n̪ˠə n̪ˠuəˈɣeːlʲɟə]; "Historical Dictionary of Modern Irish") project was started in 1976 with the aim of creating a historical dictionary for Modern Irish. The dictionary will cover a period from 1600 to the present day. In contrast to most existing Irish dictionaries, this will be an Irish–Irish dictionary. Most others, including the highly regarded de Bhaldraithe and Ó Dónaill dictionaries, are Irish–English bilingual dictionaries.

Use will be made of written sources, the spoken language and folklore in order to collect the headwords for the dictionary. Over 4,000 Irish language texts, comprising some 19 million words, make up the Historical Corpus of the Irish Language. The Corpus Of Irish 1600–1882 was published on CD-ROM in 2004. Work is in progress on the online version, in Donegal and in Dublin; this is the Corpus Of Irish 1882–2000. The project is accommodated in the Royal Irish Academy, Dublin and in Ionad Fiontraíochta Shliabh Liag, Carrick, County Donegal. This online corpus of prose and poetry drawn from both published and manuscript material, allows users to read and download texts, and also to search for words across the entire range of texts in a variety of ways.

In 2019 it was announced that the project would receive Government funding of €920,000 for the next five years.

== Objectives of Foclóir Stairiúil na Nua-Ghaeilge ==
There are several objectives to the Historical Dictionary of Irish, these include...

1. Being the most comprehensive Irish dictionary in 400 years.
2. Build on the Royal Irish Academy's Dictionary of the Irish Language Based Mainly on Old and Middle Irish Materials by covering post 1650 Irish.
3. Contain new historical definition that stem from a wide array of sources, this includes but not limited to poetry, journals, manuscripts and written & spoken sources.
4. Highlight the current and past usage of Irish words and phrases.
