= Mercier Press =

Irish publisher

- Founded: 1944
- Founder: Seán Feehan
- Country of origin: Ireland
- Headquarters location: Cork
- Distribution: Gill (Ireland); Dufour Editions (USA)
- Nonfiction topics: Irish history, biography, sport, politics, business and current affairs
- Fiction genres: Literature, children
- Official website: www.mercierpress.ie

Mercier Press is a publisher based in Cork, Ireland. It is the longest established independent publishing house in Ireland.

== History ==
The company was founded in 1944 by Seán Feehan and initially published religious books. In 1946 they published This Tremendous Lover by Dom Eugene Boylan, which sold over a million copies. At the Frankfurt Book Fair Feehan secured the translation rights of German books on philosophy and religion that sold well. In the 1960s they launched a successful range of paperbacks on Irish literature, culture, religion and history.

In the 1960s and 1970s the Mercier paperback books had a distinctive cover style. This usually consisted of an illustration, in both pen and ink and brush and ink, and always in two colour. The format and back cover layout remained the same on each book. The artist John Skelton (1925–2009) was Mercier's main cover designer – he worked as an art director and book illustrator before concentrating full-time on painting in 1975.

Feehan remained chairman until his death in 1991, after which John Spillane took over until 2003, when Clodagh Feehan was appointed manager director. The company acquired the Anvil Press holding in 2008.
