= Eileen Óg =

Song written by Percy French

Eileen Óg, also known as "The Pride of Petravore", is an Irish comic song with words by Percy French and a melody adapted by composer and arranger Houston Collisson. Written more than a century ago, the song tells of a beautiful young woman whose admirers are too shy to approach her, only for her to marry a cattle dealer, McGrath, who wins her attention by appearing indifferent to her.

The song subsequently entered the Irish folk repertoire and is also widely played instrumentally under the title The Pride of Petravore. Recordings and arrangements have been made by performers including Brendan O'Dowda, The Dubliners, De Dannan, Lankum and The Mary Wallopers.

== Composition ==
French wrote the words to the song, while its melody was adapted by his regular musical collaborator, Houston Collisson. Modern sheet music published by Faber Music describes the work as being based on a traditional melody adapted by Collisson, with lyrics by French. French and Collisson collaborated on a number of works; Collisson frequently provided musical settings or arrangements for French's songs.

A typescript of Eileen Oge (The Pride of Petravore), attributed to French, is held by the National Library of Ireland among the Ceannt and O'Brennan Papers.

The title uses the Irish adjective óg, meaning "young", so that Eileen Óg may be rendered as "young Eileen".

== Lyrics and story ==
The song is narrated collectively by the young men of Petravore, who describe Eileen as the beauty of the district. Her appearance has made them so shy that none is willing to approach her.

At the fair of Ballintubber she meets McGrath, a cattle dealer who, unlike her other admirers, appears not to notice her. His indifference has the opposite effect from that of the other men's attention: Eileen pursues him, and the two eventually marry.

The final verse presents the story as humorous advice to other suitors: displaying too much interest may be less effective than appearing indifferent.

== Petravore ==
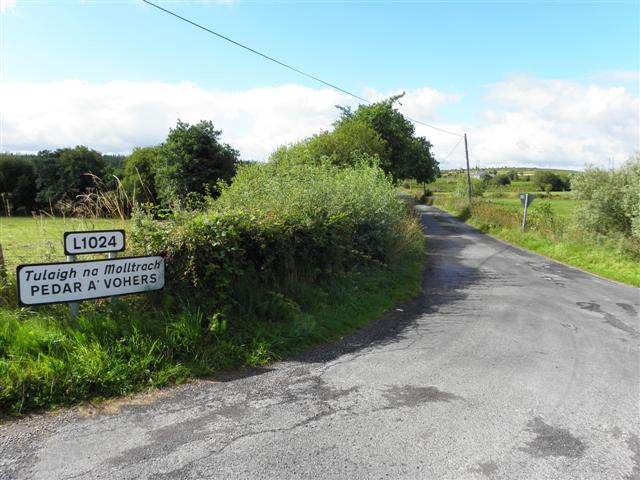
L1024, Pedar A' Vohers Heading SSW from the R200

The location named in the song has generated discussion because "Petravore" does not correspond straightforwardly to a modern town or village. Writing in The Irish Times in 2023, Frank McNally linked French's fictionalised Petravore with Pedar a' Vohers in the County Cavan area of Tullynamoltra near Swanlinbar. The placename derives from Irish Peadar a' Bhóthair, "Peter of the Road".

McNally noted that French frequently used or adapted Irish placenames in his songs and that the geography in Eileen Óg is deliberately loose: the cattle fair in the song takes place at Ballintubber, a placename associated with several locations in Ireland.

French later referred to the "Pride of Petravore" again in another of his songs, Phil the Fluter's Ball.

== Musical tradition ==
Although originally a comic song, its melody also became established as an instrumental tune in Irish traditional music, generally under the title The Pride of Petravore. Faber Music describes the published setting as a traditional melody adapted by Collisson.

The tune also acquired a military association after Irish independence. According to The Irish Times, it became a popular marching air of the Free State army after French's death. In 2011 the Irish Defence Forces' No. 1 Army Band played The Pride of Petravore during the guard-of-honour inspection for a state visit by Albert II, Prince of Monaco.

Irish traditional group De Dannan recorded The Rights of Man/The Pride of Petravore as a pair of hornpipes on their 1987 album Ballroom.

== Later recordings and revival ==
The song has been recorded under both of its principal titles. The Dubliners included a version called Eileen Og in their repertoire, helping to introduce the song to a wider international audience.

In 2019, Dublin folk group Lankum recorded an extensively rearranged instrumental version, The Pride of Petravore, for their album The Livelong Day. The Irish Times described the arrangement as a transformation of French's "sprightly" original into a darker and more ominous instrumental piece. Their recording was subsequently nominated for Best Traditional Track at the 2020 RTÉ Radio 1 Folk Awards.

The Mary Wallopers opened their self-titled 2022 debut album with a new version of Eileen Óg. NPR described the recording as a contemporary reinterpretation of French's song and noted that the group combined the older ballad with a more energetic performance style. The group performed the song on The Late Late Show in February 2023.

The song has remained part of their live repertoire; The Irish Times listed Eileen Óg among the songs performed during their 2025 concert programme.

== Legacy ==
The song has survived in both vocal and instrumental forms, moving from French's comic-song repertoire into the broader Irish folk and traditional-music tradition. Its dual identity is reflected in the continued use of both titles: vocal versions are frequently called Eileen Óg, while instrumental versions commonly retain the title The Pride of Petravore.

The continued reinterpretation of the piece by groups such as Lankum and The Mary Wallopers has brought it into contemporary Irish folk music. Reviewing a Lankum performance at Electric Picnic in 2024, The Irish Times referred to The Pride of Petravore as an "old Irish ballad", while the group continued to feature the piece in its live repertoire.

== See also ==
- Percy French
- Houston Collisson
- Irish folk music
- Music of Ireland
