= 1889 in Ireland =

- Centuries: 17th; 18th; 19th; 20th; 21st
- Decades: 1860s; 1870s; 1880s; 1890s; 1900s
- See also: 1889 in the United Kingdom; Other events of 1889; List of years in Ireland

Events from the year 1889 in Ireland.

== Events ==
- June – Edward Carson became the youngest Queen's Counsel in Ireland (aged 35).
- 12 June – The Armagh rail disaster occurred near Armagh: runaway carriages from a Sunday school excursion collided with an oncoming train, killing 80, the worst railway accident in Ireland.
- 16 July – The Ballymena and Larne Railway was taken over by Belfast and Northern Counties Railway.
- 14 September – Londoner Percival Spencer performed the first parachute jump in Ireland, at Drumcondra in Dublin. He jumped from two thousand feet in front of 25,000 people at 6.30 pm.
- 1 November – Portrush life-boat The Robert and Agnes Blair, going to the aid of the schooner Dryad, capsized off the coast at Portballintrae with the loss of three of her thirteen crew.
- 24 December – Irish nationalist Charles Stewart Parnell was accused of adultery after Captain Willy O'Shea filed for divorce on the grounds that his wife Kitty O'Shea had an affair with Parnell. The scandal later resulted in the dismissal of Parnell as leader of the Irish Parliamentary Party.
- A religious group of the Order of Carmelites left Dublin for the United States at the invitation of the New York Archbishop, later establishing the Provence of St. Elias.
- The National Society for the Prevention of Cruelty to Children was founded.
- The Land League built a house for recently evicted tenant Tom Kelly in Kiltimagh, County Mayo.
- Poet W. B. Yeats was introduced by John O'Leary to Irish nationalist Maude Gonne.
- Industrialist Horace Plunkett returned to Ireland after his father's death.
- The Tropical Ravine House in Belfast Botanic Gardens was built by head gardener Charles McKimm.
- The foundation stone was laid for the Albert Bridge, Belfast, by Queen Victoria's grandson, Prince Albert Victor.
- The Cork County Southern Star weekly newspaper was established in Skibbereen, County Cork, incorporating The Skibbereen Eagle (1857).

== Arts and literature ==
- Percy French wrote the comic song Slattery's Mounted Foot.
- John Thomas Gilbert's Calendar of Ancient Records of the Corporation of Dublin was published.
- Alfred Graves wrote the song lyrics of Father O'Flynn.
- Douglas Hyde published Beside the Fire.
- George Moore published the novel Mike Fletcher.
- Standish James O'Grady published Red Hugh's Captivity.
- Whitworth Porter published History of the Corps of Royal Engineers.
- Amye Reade's Ruby was published.
- Dr. G. T. Stokes published Ireland and the Anglo-Norman Church.
- Oscar Wilde published his dialogue, The Decay of Lying, and his story The Portrait of Mr. W. H..
- W. B. Yeats published The Wanderings of Oisin and Other Poems (including Down by the Salley Gardens) and Crossways.

== Sport ==
=== Boxing ===
- 8 July – The last official bare-knuckle title fight was held when Irish American Heavyweight Champion John L. Sullivan defeated Jake Kilrain in a world championship bout lasting 75 rounds in Mississippi.

=== Association football ===
- International
  2 March – England 6–0 Ireland (in Liverpool)
  9 March – Scotland 7–0 Ireland (in Glasgow)
  27 April – Ireland 1–3 Wales (in Belfast)
  Irish Cup
  Winners: Distillery 5–4 YMCA
- Glenavon F.C. was founded in Lurgan, County Armagh.

=== Gaelic Games ===
- The first Gaelic Athletic Association (GAA) Armagh Championship was held.
- The hierarchy of the Catholic Church, including Archbishop Logue, condemned the GAA for its violence and demoralising influences as well as charging the association as a recruiting ground of radical nationalist organizations.
- 24 March – The first Cavan GAA convention was held in Armagh.
- 8 September – The Cavan GAA held a football game between Killinkere and Crosserlough. The game was reported by The Anglo-Celt as "...More like a contest between 42 dangerous and ferocious wire haired lunatics than any competition."

=== Golf ===
- The Royal County Down Golf Club was founded in Newcastle, County Down.
- The Royal Dublin Golf Club moved from Sutton to its present home on Bull Island in Dublin.
- Golf was first played at the Dooks Golf Club in Killorglin, County Kerry, and at the Portstewart Golf Club.

== Births ==
- 1 January – Patrick MacGill of Glenties, "navvy poet", journalist and novelist (died 1963).
- 10 January – Maurice Collis, colonial administrator and writer (died 1973).
- 2 February – Dorothy Macardle, author and historian (died 1958).
- 19 February – Albert Stewart, rugby player (killed in action 1917).
- 8 March – Ina Boyle, composer (died 1967).
- 17 March
  - Harry Clarke, stained glass artist and book illustrator (died 1931).
  - Fionán Lynch, Sinn Féin MP and TD, member of First Dáil, cabinet minister, Cumann na nGaedheal and Fine Gael TD (died 1966).
- 12 April – Patrick McGilligan, Cumann na nGaedheal/Fine Gael TD and cabinet minister (died 1979).
- 13 April – Ernest Blythe, writer, journalist and theatre manager, member of First Dáil and cabinet minister (died 1975).
- 31 May – Helen Waddell, poet, translator and playwright (died 1965).
- 7 June – Frank Duff, founder of the Legion of Mary (died 1980).
- 10 June – Jack Finlay, Laois hurler and TD (died 1942).
- June – James Sleator, painter (died 1950).
- 19 July – John Vincent Holland, soldier, recipient of the Victoria Cross for gallantry in 1916 at Guillemont, France (died 1975).
- 22 July – Conor Maguire, Chief Justice of Ireland (died 1971).
- 22 August – Seán MacEntee, Fianna Fáil TD and Tánaiste from 1959 to 1965 (died 1984).
- 28 September – Seán Keating, painter (died 1977).
- 17 November
  - James Duffy, soldier, recipient of the Victoria Cross for gallantry in 1917 at Kereina Peak, Palestine (died 1969).
  - Séamus Ó Grianna, writer (died 1969).
- 20 November – Brian Oswald Donn-Byrne, New York-born novelist (died 1928).
- 24 November – James Macauley, association football player (died 1945).
- 1 December – Michael Hayes, Pro-Treaty TD, cabinet minister, Ceann Comhairle of Dáil Éireann, member of Seanad Éireann member (died 1976).
- 24 December – Patrick MacGill, journalist, poet and novelist (died 1963).
  Full date unknown
  - Joan de Sales La Terriere, born Joan Grubb, socialite, equestrienne and divorcée (died 1968).

== Deaths ==
- 23 January – Michael Joseph Barry, poet (born 1817).
- 9 February – Peter Lalor, leader of the Eureka Stockade rebellion in Australia (born 1827).
- 29 February – Richard Pigott, newspaper editor, suicide (born 1835).
- 16 March – Hans Crocker, lawyer and Wisconsin politician (born 1815).
- 13 April – Thomas Lane, recipient of the Victoria Cross for gallantry in 1860 at the Taku Forts, China (born 1836).
- 10 May – Edward Jennings, soldier, recipient of the Victoria Cross for gallantry in 1857 at Lucknow, India (b. c.1820).
- 31 May – Charles Lanyon, architect (born 1813 in England).
- 8 June – Gerard Manley Hopkins, Jesuit poet and scholar (born 1844 in England).
- 19 July – Patrick Green, soldier, recipient of the Victoria Cross for gallantry in 1857 at Delhi, India (born 1824).
- 6 October – Hans Garrett Moore, soldier, recipient of the Victoria Cross for gallantry in 1877 at Komgha, South Africa (born 1830).
- 21 October – John Ball, politician, naturalist and Alpine traveller (born 1818).
- 18 November – William Allingham, poet and diarist (born 1824).
- 29 November – Arthur Gerald Geoghegan, poet.
- 7 December – John Tuigg, third Roman Catholic Bishop of Pittsburgh, Pennsylvania (born 1828).
- Full date unknown – Henry Hudson, magazine editor.

== See also ==
- 1889 in Scotland
- 1889 in Wales
