= Wexford Arts Centre =

Municipal building in Wexford, County Wexford, Ireland

- Ionad Ealaíon Loch Garman
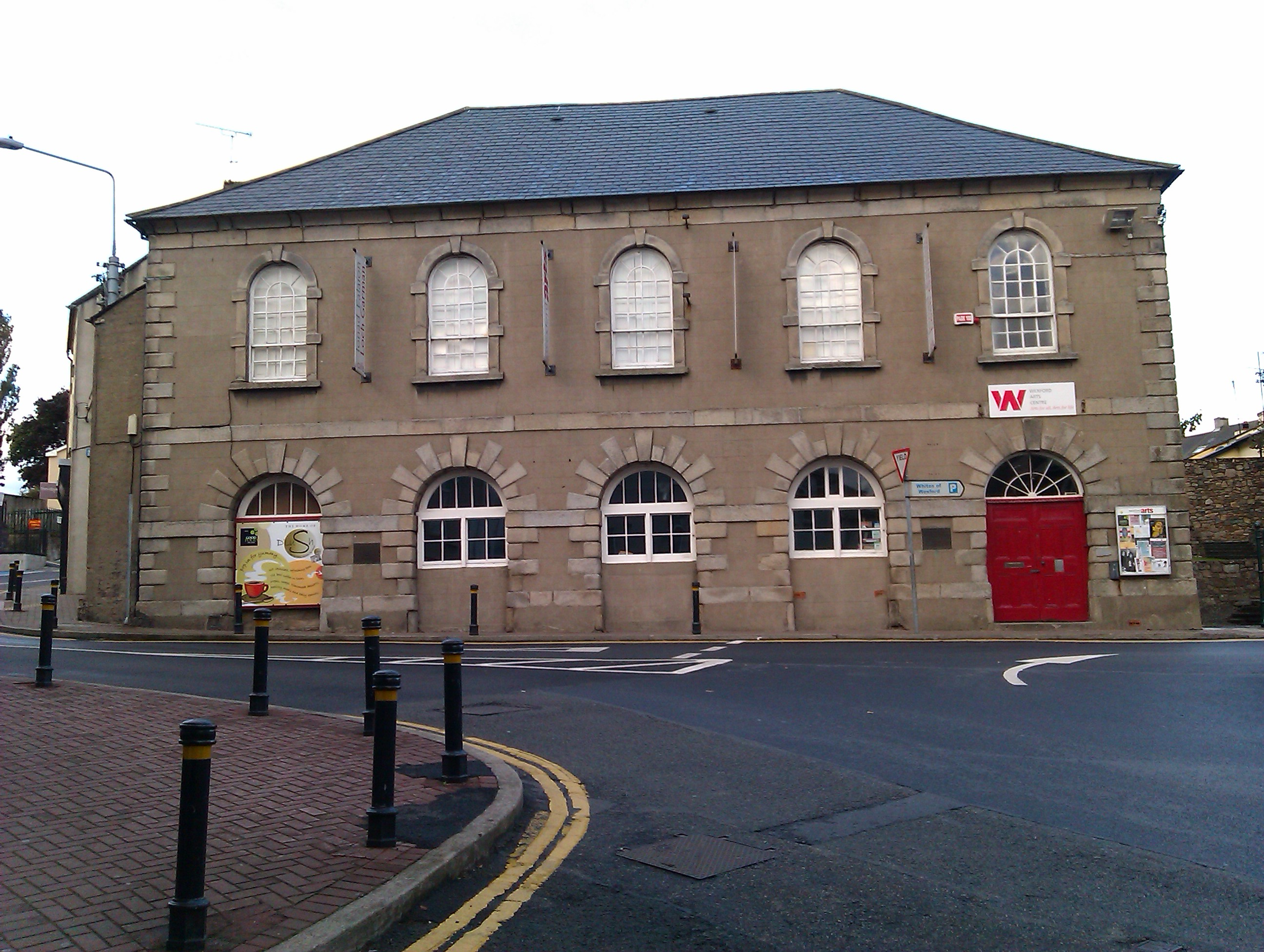
- Wexford Arts Centre

- Location within Ireland

General information
- Architectural style: Neoclassical, Georgian
- Location: John's Gate Street, Wexford, Ireland
- Coordinates: 52.3396°N 6.4639°W
- Construction started: 1772
- Completed: 1776

Technical details
- Material: Granite

Design and construction
- Developer: Wexford Corporation

Wexford Arts Centre (Irish: Ionad Ealaíon Loch Garman), formerly known as Wexford Town Hall and before that Wexford Cornmarket, is a former municipal building in John's Gate Street, Wexford, County Wexford, Ireland. The building served as the headquarters of Wexford Borough Council for much of the first half of the 20th century, but now accommodates an arts centre.

== History ==
=== Early history ===
Since medieval times corn merchants had conducted their trade in the opened air in Cornmarket. After finding this arrangement inadequate, Wexford Corporation decided to commission a dedicated corn exchange: the site they selected, at the west end of Cornmarket, was owned by the lord of the manor, John Grogan, whose seat was at Johnstown Castle. The new building was designed in the neoclassical style, built in brick with a cement render finish and was completed in 1776.

The design involved a symmetrical main frontage of five bays facing onto John's Gate Street. The ground floor was arcaded, so that markets could be held, with an assembly room on the first floor. There were five openings on the ground floor formed with voussoirs and keystones, while the first floor was fenestrated by round headed casement windows with Gibbs surrounds. There was a cavetto-shaped cornice and a hipped roof. Internally, the principal room was the assembly room on the first floor which featured a ceiling with an acanthus-themed ceiling rose and fine plasterwork.

The Methodist theologian, John Wesley, preached in the assembly room in May 1787. He was impressed by the room and described it as "one of the largest I ever saw: and high and low, rich and poor, flocked together; and it seemed as if many of them were ripe for the Gospel."

=== 19th century ===
The local Brunswick Constitutional Club, named after the Duke of Brunswick and formed by Protestants as part of a campaign to deny Catholics the right to enter both houses of the British parliament, was established in the assembly room in 1828.

During the 19th century, the building was a regular venue for social functions, concerts, and theatrical performances: civic leaders hosted the Lord Lieutenant of Ireland, Constantine Phipps, Earl of Mulgrave at a banquet in 1836, and, later in the century, performers included Percy French, who wrote the lyrics to the song The Mountains of Mourne.

The abolitionist Frederick Douglass spoke at the assembly rooms above the market on 7 and 8 October 1845 before a mostly quaker audience during his tour of Ireland.

=== 20th century ===
After becoming the offices and meeting place of the Wexford Corporation in the early 20th century, it became known as Wexford Town Hall.

During the First World War, in the context of soaring food prices, the building served as the main venue for the sale of vegetables in the town. After Wexford Corporation re-located its offices to Wexford Courthouse in 1950, the building continued to serve as a community events venue but was re-purposed as an arts centre in 1974.

=== 21st century ===
A major programme of refurbishment works, involving the creation of a new entrance, a new gallery and additional workshop space, was carried out by McKellen Construction at a cost of €3 million to a design by ODKM Architects, and completed in October 2022.
