= Are Ye Right There Michael =

Irish song

Are Ye Right There Michael is a song by the 19th-century and early 20th-century Irish composer and musician Percy French, parodying the state of the West Clare Railway system in rural County Clare. It was inspired by an actual train journey on 10 August 1896. Because of a slow train and the decision of the driver to stop for no apparent reason, French, though having left Dublin in the early morning, arrived so late for an 8pm recital that the audience had left. The ballad caused considerable embarrassment for the railway company, which was mocked in music halls throughout Ireland and Britain because of the song. It led to an unsuccessful libel action against French.

It is said that when French arrived late for the libel hearing, the judge chided him on his lateness. French reportedly responded "Your honour, I travelled by the West Clare Railway", resulting in the case being thrown out.

== Lyrics ==
Are Ye Right There Michael
by Percy French (1902)

You may talk of Columbus's sailing
Across the Atlantical Sea
But he never tried to go railing
From Ennis as far as Kilkee
You run for the train in the morning
The excursion train starting at eight
You're there when the clock gives the warnin'
And there for an hour you'll wait
And as you're waiting in the train
You'll hear the guard sing this refrain:

Are ye right there, Michael, are ye right?
Do you think that we'll be there before the night?
Ye've been so long in startin'
That ye couldn't say for certain
Still ye might now, Michael
So ye might!

They find out where the engine's been hiding
And it drags you to sweet Corofin
Says the guard: "Back her down on the siding
There's a goods from Kilrush coming in."
Perhaps it comes in two hours
Perhaps it breaks down on the way
"If it does," says the guard, "by the powers
We're here for the rest of the day!"

And while you sit and curse your luck
The train backs down into a truck.

Are ye right there, Michael, are ye right?
Have ye got the parcel there for Mrs White?
Ye haven't, oh begorra
Say it's comin' down tomorra
And well it might now, Michael
So it might

At Lahinch the sea shines like a jewel
With joy you are ready to shout
When the stoker cries out: "There's no fuel
And the fire's tee-totally out!
But hand up that bit of a log there
I'll soon have ye out of the fix
There's a fine clamp of turf in the bog there
And the rest go a-gatherin' sticks."

And while you're breakin' bits of trees
You hear some wise remarks like these:

"Are ye right there, Michael? Are ye right?
Do ye think that you can get the fire to light?
Oh, an hour you'll require
For the turf it might be drier
Well it might now, Michael
So it might."

A popular sung version by Brendan O'Dowda adds the following lyrics which may or may not have been part of the original:

Kilkee! Oh you never get near it!
You're in luck if the train brings you back
For the permanent way is so queer
It spends most of its time off the track.
Uphill the old engine is climbin'
While the passengers push with a will
You're in luck when you reach Ennistymon
For all the way home is downhill.

And as you're wobblin' through the dark
you hear the guard make this remark:

"Are you right there, Michael, are ye right?
Do you think that you'll be home before it's light?"
"Tis all dependin' whether
The old engine holds together—
And it might now, Michael, so it might! (so it might),
And it might, now, Michael, so it might."
