= West Clare Railway =

Heritage railway in County Clare, Ireland

- Line owned by West Clare Railway; Lines owned by South Clare Railways (worked by WCR)
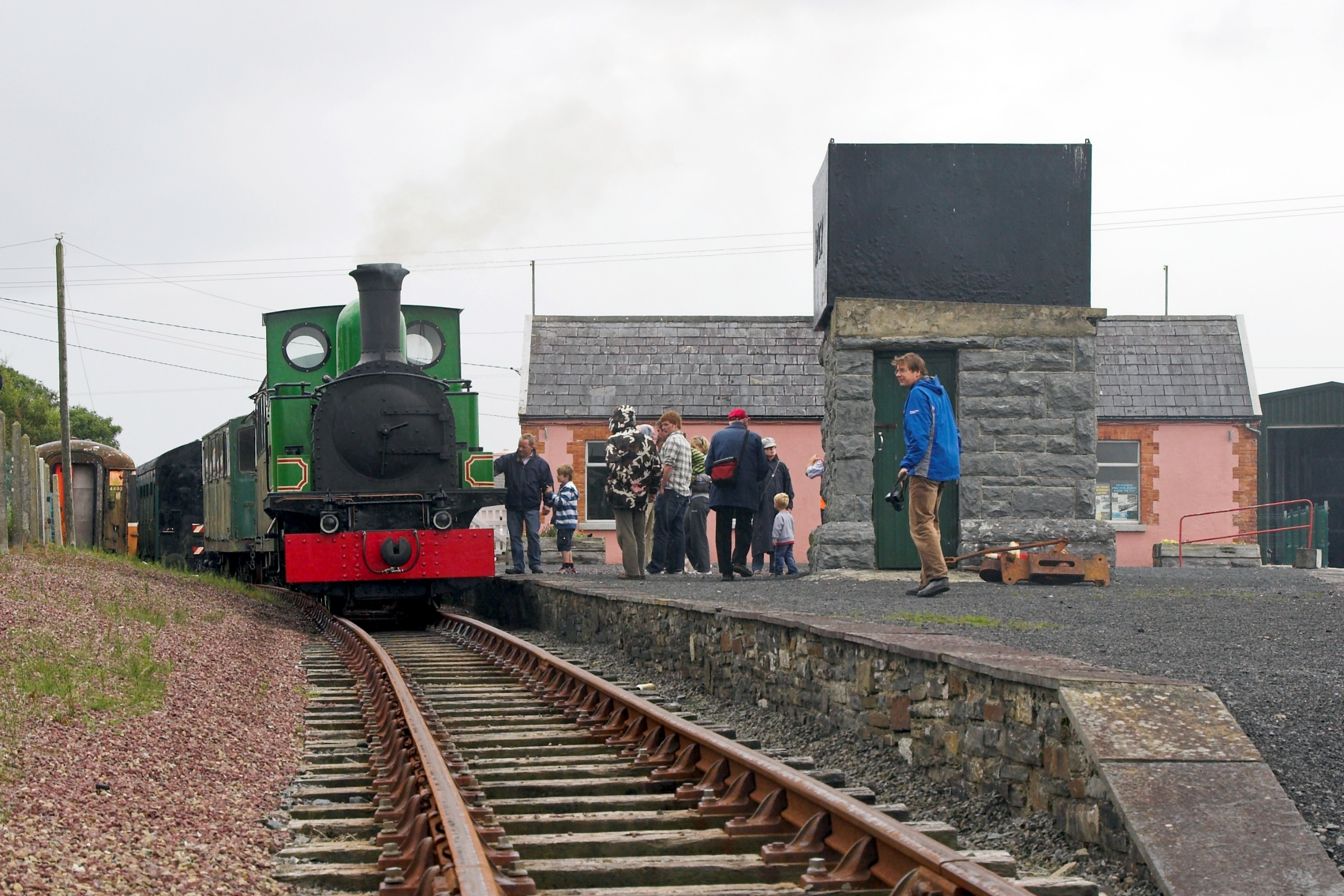
- Moyasta Junction with water tower

Overview
- Locale: County Clare, Ireland
- Dates of operation: 1887–1961

Technical
- Track gauge: 3 ft (914 mm)
- Length: 53 miles (85 km) (1922)
- Track length: 57 miles 55 chains (92.8 km) (1922)

The West Clare Railway (WCR) originally operated in County Clare, Ireland, between 1887 and 1961. This 3 ft (914 mm) narrow-gauge railway ran from the county town of Ennis, via numerous stopping-points along the West Clare coast to two termini, at Kilrush and Kilkee, with the routes diverging at Moyasta Junction. The system was the last operating narrow gauge passenger system in Ireland and connected with the mainline rail system at Ennis, where a station still stands today for bus and train services to Limerick and Galway. Intermediate stops included Ennistymon, Lahinch and Milltown Malbay.

A preservation society maintains a railway museum at Moyasta Junction station, and successfully re-opened a section of the railway as a passenger-carrying heritage line with diesel traction in the 1990s, and with steam motive power from 2009.

The railway was notorious for poor timekeeping, resulting in litigation and a celebrated comic song.

== Construction ==
After the Great Famine ended there was a new growth in local businesses, and the British Government determined that an improved railway system was necessary to aid the recovery of the West of Ireland. The West Clare Railway and the South Clare Railway were built by separate companies, but in practice, the West Clare Railway operated the entire line. The lines met at Milltown Malbay. In due course, the entire line became known as the West Clare Railway.

=== West Clare Railway ===
Tramways (Ireland) Provisional Order (West Clare Railway) Confirmation Act 1884
- Act of Parliament
- Parliament of the United Kingdom
- Long title: An Act to confirm a Provisional Order of the Lord Lieutenant and Privy Council in Ireland relating to the West Clare Railway.
- Citation: 47 & 48 Vict. c. ccxvii

Dates
- Royal assent: 7 August 1884

Text of statute as originally enacted

The 43.4 km-long (27.0 mi) West Clare Railway between Ennis and Milltown Malbay was built a few years earlier than the South Clare Railway. It was authorised by the West Clare Railway Order 1884, which was confirmed by the Tramways (Ireland) Provisional Order (West Clare Railway) Confirmation Act 1884 (47 & 48 Vict. c. ccxvii). The first sod was cut on 26 January 1885 at Milltown Malbay by Charles Stewart Parnell MP, although actual work on the line had begun in November 1884.

In late February 1887, the Athenry and Ennis Railway (A&E) filed an injunction to prevent the West Clare Railway from accessing lands it had built on that the A&E had previously claimed but not yet constructed on for itself. The case went to arbitration in March 1887. The West Clare Railway initially agreed to pay £51 annually for the right to build on the land, then in a second agreement reached on 27 June 1888, the West Clare Railway was ordered to pay rent at £60 annually to the A&E (which later became part of the Waterford, Limerick and Western Railway) for use of the land.

The line was opened on 2 July 1887. The notes for construction of the line were closed in December 1887.

=== South Clare Railway ===
Tramways Order in Council (Ireland) South Clare Railways Confirmation Act 1890
- Act of Parliament
- Parliament of the United Kingdom
- Long title: An Act to confirm an Order in Council of the Lord Lieutenant and Privy Council in Ireland relating to the South Clare Railways.
- Citation: 53 & 54 Vict. c. ccx

Dates
- Royal assent: 14 August 1890

Text of statute as originally enacted

The South Clare Railway built the extension from Milltown Malbay to Kilrush, Cappagh Pier (Kilrush Pier) and Kilrush docks with a branch to Kilkee from Moyasta. The line was proposed in 1889, authorised by the South Clare Railways Order 1890 which was confirmed by the Tramways Order in Council (Ireland) South Clare Railways Confirmation Act 1890 (53 & 54 Vict. c. ccx), with work starting on the extension in October 1890 and opening on 11 May 1892. The extension was worked by the West Clare Railway and was initially dogged by poor service and time keeping, but this later improved. Some of the service irregularity was attributed, in a report given at the railway's annual meeting in 1894, to a requirement set by the Board of Trade to run separate passenger and goods trains rather than mixed trains.

== Operation and timekeeping ==
The West Clare Railway was the topic of Percy French's song "Are Ye Right There Michael, are ye right?" (written in 1902), deriding the poor timekeeping and poor track quality of the time. Though amusing, some complained that this jesting nevertheless did little to further the cause for keeping the line open. French wrote the song after successfully suing the railway company for loss of earnings, when a late-running train prevented him from attending a performance on time. The company, in turn, appealed the ruling, but French was over an hour late for the court hearing in Ennis. He informed the judge that his lateness was because "I took the West Clare Railway here, your honour". The railway company's appeal was unsuccessful.

Many myths have arisen concerning the Percy French incident. The facts are that French had arrived in Kilkee four-and-a-half hours after the scheduled time for a show he was due to give at Moore's Hall on 10 August 1896. He had been due there at 3:25 pm, having begun his journey at Broadstone Terminus in Dublin that morning. The show was late starting as a result, and with a much-reduced audience. French won his case at the Ennis Quarter Sessions in January 1897, and was awarded £10 plus expenses. The Clare Journal's headline for the court hearing was, 'An Hour With Percy French "free of charge"'. The case has since been re-enacted by the Corofin Dramatic Society at Ennis Courthouse. His award was subsequently upheld in a reserved judgment when the railway company appealed the case two months later at the Clare Spring Assizes, before the Rt. Hon. Chief Baron Christopher Palles, by which time French had the germ of a song in his head: the line, 'If you want to get to Kilkee, you must go there by the sea' was repeated in court although it failed to make it in the song's final version. The Railway had a disastrous policy of defending litigation. In another case heard on the same day as the Percy French case, Mrs. Mary Ann Butler, from Limerick sued the Railway successfully when she was struck by a donkey on the Railway platform in Ennis.

== Amalgamation and nationalisation ==
In 1925, the company was merged into the Great Southern Railways. In 1945 the GSR was taken over by Córas Iompair Éireann. In the same year, a survey of local businesses was conducted with a view to the possible replacement of the railway by road services. CIE was nationalised in 1950. Local campaigners urged that the railway be converted to the standard Irish gauge of 5 ft 3 in (1,600 mm), but CIÉ rejected this on cost grounds.

== Steam locomotives ==
The West Clare Railway operated a fleet of eighteen steam locomotives. Some historical confusion is caused by the reusing of fleet numbers (when locomotives were withdrawn, their numbers were reallocated). Each entry in the table below is a separate locomotive, even where fleet numbers are repeated.

Number	Name	Class	Class (GSR)	Wheel arrangement	Built	Notes
1		Original		0-6-0T	1886 Bagnall	The original four tank engines were too light; scrapped in 1912
2		Original		0-6-0T	1886 Bagnall	The original four tank engines were too light; scrapped in 1900
3	Clifden	Original		0-6-0T	1887 Bagnall	The original four tank engines were too light; scrapped in 1915
4	Besborough	Original		0-6-0T	1887 Bagnall	The original four tank engines were too light; scrapped in 1901
5	Slieve Callan	IN1	5C	0-6-2T	1892 Dübs & Co	Preserved and returned to service on the WCR since 2009.
6	Saint Senan	IN1	5C	0-6-2T	1892 Dübs & Co	Identical to preserved locomotive 5 (above).
7	Lady Inchiquin	IN1	5C	0-6-2T	1892 Dübs & Co	Identical to preserved locomotive 5 (above).
8	Lisdoonvarna	PN1	2C	2-6-2T	Dübs & Co	
9	Fergus	PN1	2C	2-6-2T	T Green	
2	Ennis	PN1	2C	2-6-2T	T Green	
4	Liscannor	PN1	2C	2-6-2T	T Green	
10	Lahinch	BN1	10C	4-6-0T	Kerr, Stuart & Co	
11	Kilkee	BN2	11C	4-6-0T	Bagnall	
1	Kilrush	BN3	1C	4-6-0T	Hunslet	
3	Ennistymon	BN4	3C	4-6-0T	Hunslet	
7	Malbay	BN4	3C	4-6-0T	Hunslet	
6				2-6-0T	Hunslet	Acquired second-hand, shortly before closure.
8				2-6-0T	Hunslet	Acquired second-hand, shortly before closure.

== Diesel locomotives and units ==
In the early 1950s, under CIÉ management, the West Clare Railway became a pioneer in the use of diesel traction. Passenger services were largely operated by four new articulated diesel railcars, built by Walker Brothers of Wigan, England (almost identical to units built for the County Donegal Railways). These were followed by three diesel locomotives (also built by Walkers). The use of diesel traction reduced operating costs, yet the investment in new rolling stock would largely be wasted by the early closure of the line.

Number	Type	Built	Notes
	Diesel railcar	Walker Brothers	
	Diesel railcar	Walker Brothers	
	Diesel railcar	Walker Brothers	
	Diesel railcar	Walker Brothers	
F501	107 bhp diesel locomotive	1955 Walker Brothers	
F502	107 bhp diesel locomotive	1955 Walker Brothers	
F503	107 bhp diesel locomotive	1955 Walker Brothers	

== Closure ==
Despite the dieselisation of passenger services in 1952 and freight in 1953 the system was still closed. On 27 September 1960, CIÉ gave notice of its intending closure with effect from 1 February 1961. CIÉ said that the West Clare was losing £23,000 (€1.2M 2006 equivalent) per year, despite the considerable traffic handled. In December it was announced that the line would close completely on 1 January 1961. Eventually, the line closed on 31 January 1961 with CIÉ starting work on dismantling the line the day after the closure on 1 February 1961.

By the time of its closure, the West Clare Railway was the last narrow-gauge railway in Ireland offering a passenger service; various lines operated by Bord na Móna continue to operate in connection with the peat industry.

== Preservation and re-opening ==
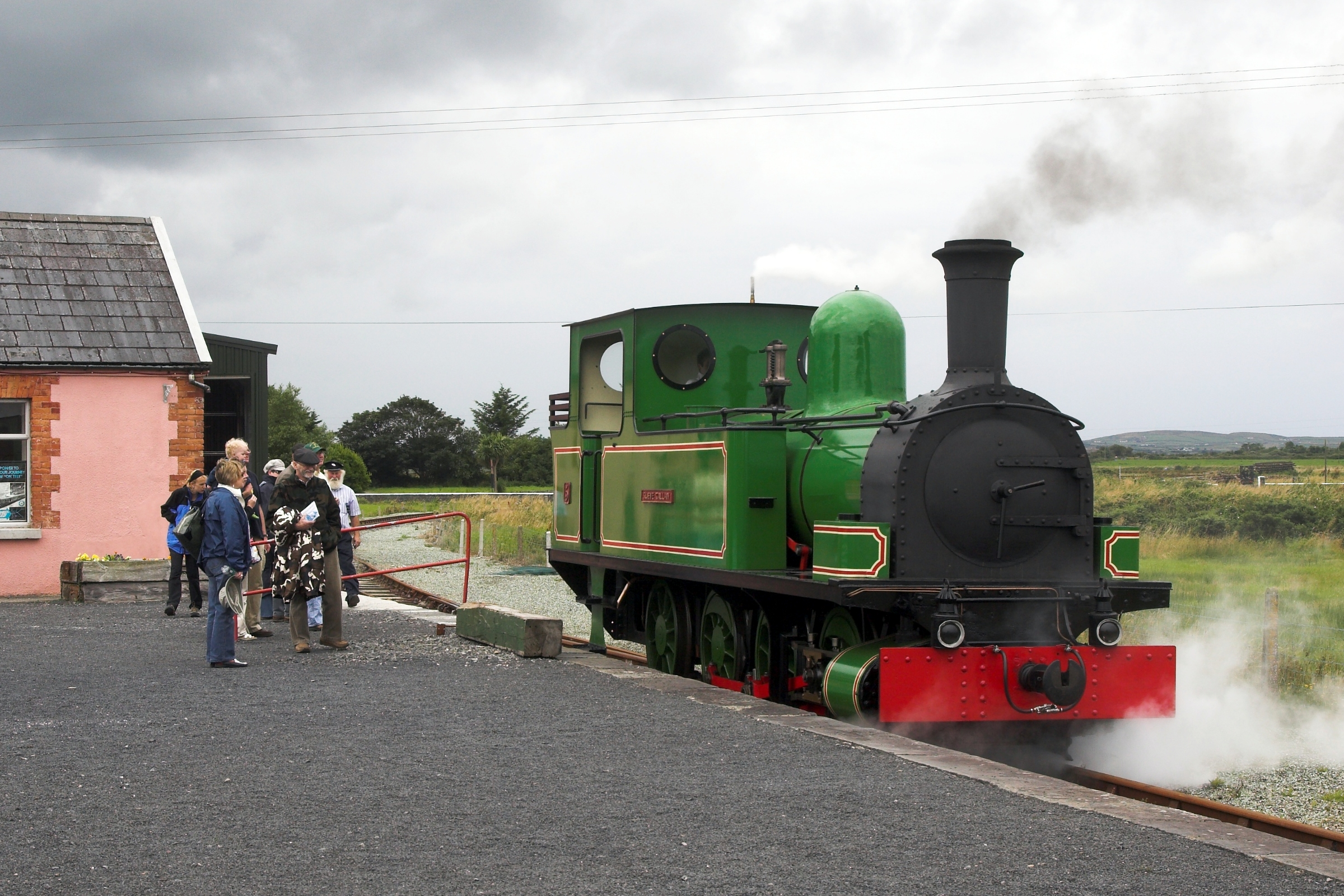
Slieve Callan a few weeks after return to West Clare tracks

Starting in the mid-1990s, efforts were made by a preservation society to recreate part of the original route. This group succeeded in acquiring Moyasta station, and 5 km (3.1 mi) of the track bed. Passenger services were resumed using two new steel coaches with bench seating, parallel to the direction of travel, built by Alan Keef Engineering and outfitted locally in wood by WCR engineers. A small but powerful diesel locomotive built for Channel Tunnel construction work hauled the trains.

On 5 July 2009 the West Clare Railway's original steam locomotive No 5 Slieve Callan was returned to the West Clare Railway at Moyasta Junction following restoration in England by Alan Keef Engineering Ltd of Ross-on-Wye. This engine had previously been a static exhibit at the mainline railway station in Ennis. The locomotive was steamed for the first time on 14 July marking the return of steam to the West Clare Railway after an absence of over 57 years.

The railway has since acquired a number of redundant diesel locomotives, mostly from the Irish Bord na Móna; these are being gradually restored and returned to service.

=== Narrow gauge rolling stock ===
In addition to the steam locomotive Slieve Callan, the railway owns twelve diesel engines, of which two are currently in service, the others awaiting restoration. Those in service are a 4-wheel Channel Tunnel shunting engine and a four-wheel former Bord na Móna shunter. Awaiting restoration are a further nine such Bord na Móna shunters, plus a six-wheel mine shunting engine dating from around 1948.

Two passenger coaches are in service, and assorted maintenance vehicles including a tank wagon, four flat trucks, and four tipper wagons.

=== Irish standard gauge rolling stock ===
==== Current ====
In 2008, the West Clare Railway acquired an Irish standard gauge ex-Irish Rail 001 class diesel loco, No.015 (formerly A15) The locomotive is stored on a section of Irish Gauge track at Moyasta.

Two grounded passenger carriages are also located at Moyasta station:

- Great Southern Railways Side Corridor carriage No.1325 (used as a reception centre and cafeteria for visitors)
- Iarnród Éireann Mark 2 carriage No. 4402 (used as a lecture theatre for group visits)

Irish standard gauge rolling stock at the West Clare Railway
Vehicle Number	Class	Owner	Arrived at Moyasta
1325	Great Southern Railways carriage	West Clare Railway	Unknown
4402	Iarnród Éireann Mark 2 carriage	West Clare Railway	Unknown
A15	CIÉ A Class diesel locomotive	West Clare Railway	2008

==== Former ====
The WCR used to own 201 class No. C227, which was stored off-site until it was scrapped in July 2025.

Two other grounded ex-IÉ Mark 2 carriages (Nos. 4108 and 4110) were stored at Moyasta until they were scrapped in 2022.

Three privately owned ex-IÉ Mark 3 carriages were removed from the site in June (No. 6402) and August (Nos. 7146 and 6105) of 2025.

The Irish Traction Group (ITG) stored five of their locomotives at Moyasta, until one of them was relocated to Downpatrick and County Down Railway in 2014 with the other four following in 2025.

=== Closure ===
The heritage railway has been closed since June 1, 2022 until further notice. Plans for a limited re-opening in summer 2024 never materialized. As of the start of 2026, a proposal to convert the line from Kilrush to Kilkee into a greenway was at the advanced stages of evaluation.

== See also ==
- List of heritage railways in the Republic of Ireland
- History of rail transport in Ireland
- List of narrow-gauge railways in Ireland
- Worsley Works, who produces kits for those who model the West Clare Railway
