= Wexford Courthouse =

Neo-Georgian courthouse in Wexford, Ireland

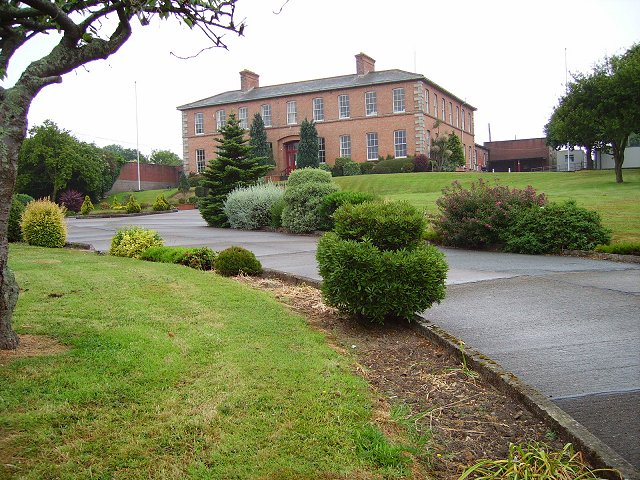
- Wexford Courthouse

- Location within Ireland

General information
- Architectural style: Neo-Georgian style
- Location: Wexford, County Wexford, Ireland
- Coordinates: 52.3393°N 6.4732°W
- Completed: 1866 (Tate School), 2018 (Courthouse)

Wexford Courthouse is a judicial facility on Belvedere Road in Wexford, County Wexford, Ireland. It is at least the fourth building to have served as Wexford Courthouse.

== History ==
A previous courthouse, located on Commercial Quay, was designed by Sir Richard Morrison in 1803, and was completed in 1806, before undergoing further renovations in 1807. This building was burnt down by the I.R.A. in 1921.

In 1925 Wexford Gaol was converted into a county hall and courthouse. A detached, five-bay, three-storey over basement building, the rear windows of the gaol featured granite Gibbs surrounds. A castellated Gothic screen and gateway serves as the entrance to this building's grounds. The jury room and the judges' chambers were renovated in 1995.

The current courthouse building, originally an educational establishment, was built between 1864 and 1866 and opened as the Tate School in March 1867. This building was designed by architect Sandham Symes. After the school got into financial difficulties and closed in 1949, the building was acquired by Wexford Corporation in 1950, at a cost of IR£5,000. After Wexford Corporation relocated from Wexford Town Hall, it served as the offices of Wexford Corporation until 2007. It was subsequently sold to the Courts Service for conversion into a courthouse to replace the aging courthouse on Hill Street which had been built in 1930. The building underwent extensive renovations and extensions, which were completed in December 2017, and represented an almost ten-fold increase in the size of the building. The court commenced sitting on 23 January 2018, and it was officially re-opened as a courthouse by Charles Flanagan, Minister for Justice and Equality, and Frank Clarke, Chief Justice of Ireland, in February 2018.
