= Houston Collisson =

Irish writer and composer

William Alexander Houston Collisson (20 May 1865 – 31 January 1920) was an Anglo-Irish priest, writer, organist, pianist, impresario, and composer, mainly remembered for his long collaboration with Percy French.

== Life ==
Collisson was born in Dublin and graduated from Trinity College Dublin with degrees as Bachelor of Arts (BA, 1887) and Doctor of Music (MusD, 1891). He also received a Licentiate in Music (LMus) from Trinity College London. In 1899, he was ordained a priest at Truro Cathedral in Cornwall and subsequently served in different parishes in England.

He was appointed organist in a number of Anglican parishes in Ireland including St Patrick's Cathedral, Trim, County Meath (1882); St Paul's Church, Bray, County Wicklow (1884); in Rathfarnham, Dublin (1885–95); at the Church of the Holy Trinity, Rathmines, Dublin (1886); St Maelrune's, Tallaght, Dublin (1893); and St George's Church, Dublin (1885–98). He also sang in the choir of St Bartholomew's Church, Dublin (1893–96).

As a concert impresario, Collisson made a name for himself for organising, from 1886, increasingly popular "Saturday Concerts" in Belfast, Cork, Derry, Dublin, and London. In these, he often appeared himself variously as conductor, accompanist, and soloist. In Dublin in 1889, these also involved a choir of 100 voices and an orchestra. An attempt to invite Edvard Grieg in 1891 failed. In 1906–7, he took time out from his London parish to do a solo tour of Ireland as a singer and performer on piano and organ in his own compositions and those of Percy French. Collision encountered extreme hostility in Birr when a protest was staged in the hall including hissing, when he sang the Percy French song Wait for a While Now Mary, an inoffensive song about courtship which he set to music in 1906. The experiences of this event is recorded extensively as part of an anecdotal diary in his book Dr. Collisson in and on Ireland, A Diary of a Tour. (1908).

Collisson was involved, too, in establishing the Feis Ceoil with Annie Patterson, and he won competitions at the Feis Ceoil a number of times in several composers categories. He was also involved with the Palestrins choir.

== Music ==
As a composer, Collisson is remembered for his collaboration with the poet, writer, painter and composer Percy French (1854–1920), for whose poems he contributed numerous songs, the best-known one being The Mountains o' Mourne. They often appeared together on stage, including regular performances in London and touring North America in 1910. Collisson also wrote operas to which French contributed the libretto, including The Knight of the Road (1891) and Strongbow (1892).

== Selected works ==
=== Stage works ===
- The Knight of the Road (libretto: Percy French), comic opera, 1891
- Strongbow, or The Bride of the Battlefield (P. French), comic opera, 1892
- Midsummer Madness (P. French), "musical comedietta", 1892
- The Irish Girl (P. French, B. Stewart), "comedy opera", 1918

=== Choral ===
- Mass in C major, c. 1890
- St Patrick, cantata (text: Annie W. Patterson), 1898
- Penzance, cantata, 1899
- The Game of Chess, cantata (text: A. W. Patterson), 1899
- Samhain, cantata (text: A. W. Patterson), 1901

=== Instrumental ===
- Three Light Pianoforte Pieces (not dated)
- Rosaleen, orchestral suite (Feis Ceoil Prize, 1903)

=== Songs ===
All to words by Percy French.

- When Erin Wakes, 1900
- Are ye right there, Michael?, 1902
- King Edward in Erin, 1903
- Maguire's Motor Bike, 1906
- Rafferty's Racin' Mare, 1906
- Wait for a while now, Mary, 1906
- Donnegan's Daughter, or The Beauty of Ballyporeen, 1908
- A Kerry Courting (song cycle), 1909
- Bad Ballads for Badish Babes (song cycle), 1910
- Tullinahaw, 1911
- The Mountains o' Mourne, 1920
- Eileen Oge, or The Pride of Petravore, published 1939

=== Writings ===
- Dr. Collisson in and on Ireland. A Diary of a Tour, with Personal Anecdotes, Notes Auto-Biographical and Impressions (London: Robert Sutton, 1908).
- Frank McNally Irishman's Diary, Houston We Have A Problem. The Irish Times, (21 January 2022).
