= Emily de Burgh Daly =

Irish nurse, writer, and traveller (1859–1935)

- Born: Emily Lucy French; 7 August 1859; Clooneyquin, County Roscommon
- Died: 13 November 1935 (aged 76); Priory Lodge, Blackrock, County Dublin
- Relatives: Percy French (brother)

Emily Lucy de Burgh Daly (7 August 1859 – 13 November 1935) was an Irish nurse, writer, and traveller.

== Life ==
Emily de Burgh Daly was born Emily Lucy French on 7 August 1859 at the family home at Clooneyquin, County Roscommon, a townland between Elphin and Tulsk. She was the fourth daughter of the nine children of Christopher French and Susan Emma French (née Percy). One of her older brothers was the humorist and songwriter Percy French. She was educated privately at home, with the children producing their own theatricals and family magazines.

Daly left home in 1888, training as a nurse at the Mildmay Hospital, Bethnal Green, London. After this she travelled to Ningbo, China, nursing and going on to take charge of a hospital for women. During her 25 years in China, she attempted to learn the language but never mastered it. When she married Charles de Burgh-Daly in October 1890, she gave up nursing. Charles was the port doctor for Ningbo and director of the Church Missionary Society Hospital. The couple had at least two sons, Ulick and Arthur Charles, and one daughter, Lucy. Her sons Arthur Charles (Charlie) and Ulick both served with the Royal Dublin Fusiliers and Lucy with the Voluntary Aid Detachment in Dublin during World War I. Her son, Charles de Burgh-Daly fell at Ginchy aged only 19 during the Battle of the Somme in 1916 and is remembered in a WW1 memorial in St John's Church, Sandymount, Dublin.

The family had moved to Niuzhuang, southern Manchuria in 1893, where they took in refugees from the Sino-Japanese war in 1894. During this time, Daly travelled around China extensively, witnessing the run up to the Boxer Rebellion and the Russo-Japanese War, escaping the country with her children during both of those conflicts. The descriptions of these conflicts in Manchuria are detailed, accurate and harrowing. She befriended the travel writer Isabella Bird (married name Bird-Bishop) then a well-known travel writer whom she met in, Manchuria. Emily's husband was recalled from Ireland in 1910 to aid in the treatment of those suffering from the pneumonic plague. Emily accompanied her husband back to China to assist him in dealing with the plague epidemic. The family settled back permanently in Sandymount, Dublin in 1912. Ironically, Emily's husband Charles de Burgh-Daly dodged a bullet from the Countess Constance Markievicz as he was sitting in the window of the University Club, St. Stephen's Green during the Easter Rising in 1916, because as a voluntary doctor in the military he was wearing a military uniform.

In 1915, she published her memoirs, An Irishwoman in China, in which she described the customs and people of China, and the lifestyle of Europeans living there. The book, which is illustrated also contains very detailed descriptions of the vegetation, plants and flowers of China. She edited two collections of work by her brother Percy French: Chronicles and Poems of Percy French (1922) and Prose, Poems and Parodies of Percy French (1926) which was republished numerous times. She died at Priory Lodge, Blackrock, County Dublin on 13 November 1935 and is buried in Mount Jerome Cemetery, Harold's Cross.

Emily gave illustrated lectures on China around Dublin in conjunction with the publication of her China memoir in 1915. She also gave illustrated lectures on her brother William Percy French around Dublin after she published The Chronicles and Poems of Percy French in 1922.
