= The Mountains of Mourne =

Song by Percy French and Houston Collisson

The lyrics to the song The Mountains of Mourne (originally spelt The Mountains o' Mourne) were written by Irish musician Percy French (1854–1920). The music was adapted by Houston Collisson (1865–1920) from the traditional Irish folk tune "Carrigdonn" or "Carrigdhoun". The latter had been similarly used by Thomas Moore (1779–1852) for his song Bendemeer's Stream.

The song is representative of French's many works concerning the Irish diaspora. The Mourne Mountains of the title are located in County Down in Northern Ireland.

The song is a whimsical look at the styles, attitudes and fashions of late nineteenth-century London as seen from the point of view of an emigrant labourer from a village near the Mourne Mountains. It is written as a message to the narrator's true love at home. The "sweep down to the sea" refrain was inspired by the view of the mountains from Skerries in north County Dublin. It contrasts the artificial attractions of the city with the more natural beauty of his homeland.

== Notable versions ==
- During World War I, the song Old Gallipoli's A Wonderful Place used phrases from this song as a basis for some of its verses. Verses in the Gallipoli song include: "At least when I asked them, that's what they told me" and "Where the old Gallipoli sweeps down to the sea".
- Australian baritone Peter Dawson popularised the song in the 1920s.
- Irish Singer Ruby Murray with Ray Martin and his orchestra recorded a two verse version [Verses 1 & 4] of this song on her 1955 10 inch RPM [Columbia] LP "When Irish Eyes Are Smiling".
- The song featured on the 1958 album, The Immortal Percy French, featuring the voice of Irish tenor Brendan O'Dowda.
- It was used in the jingle of Ulster Television's first logo in 1959.
- The Kingston Trio recorded the song in their 1960 album Sold Out. Nick Reynolds sang the lead.
- Singer Ottilie Patterson recorded it in December 1959 with Chris Barber's Jazz Band on the EP "Ottilie Swings the Irish"
- Singer-songwriter Don McLean recorded a version titled Mountains o' Mourne on Playin' Favorites in 1973, which reached number two on the Irish Singles Chart, and appears on several of his "Greatest Hits" collections.
- In 1973, Frank Hyde covered the song on his first album, Frank Hyde Sings.
- Folk singer Charlie King recorded the song on his album Somebody's Story in 1979.
- The song was referenced ("Where the Mountains of Mourne come down to the sea, is such a long, long way from Tipperary") in 1979 on the title track of Black Rose: A Rock Legend, the ninth studio album by Irish rock band Thin Lizzy
- The song was recorded by Tarkio, an alt-country band led by Colin Meloy, later of The Decemberists for their EP Sea Songs for Landlocked Sailors in 1998, and included on Omnibus, a collection of Tarkio's recordings released by Kill Rock Stars in 2006.
- Finbar Furey covered the song on the album Chasing Moonlight: Love Songs of Ireland in 2003.
- In 2008, Celtic Thunder released the song on their eponymous debut album. Their recording is adapted from Don McLean's version of the song and performed by Keith Harkin.

== Lyrics ==
The Mountains o' Mourne
by Percy French (1902)

Oh, Mary, this London's a wonderful sight,
With people all working by day and by night.
Sure, they don't sow potatoes, nor barley, nor wheat,
But there's gangs of them digging for gold in the street.
At least when I asked them that's what I was told,
So I just took a hand at this digging for gold,
But for all that I found there I might as well be
Where the Mountains o' Mourne sweep down to the sea.

I believe that when writing a wish you expressed
As to how the fine ladies in London are dressed,
Well if you'll believe me, when asked to a ball,
They don't wear no top to their dresses at all.
Oh I've seen them meself and you could not in truth,
Say if they were bound for a ball or a bath.
Don't be starting such fashions, now, Mary, mo chroí,
Where the Mountains o' Mourne sweep down to the sea.

I've seen England's king from the top of a bus
And I've never known him, but he means to know us.
And tho' by the Saxon we once were oppressed,
Still I cheered, God forgive me, I cheered with the rest.
And now that he's visited Erin's green shore
We'll be much better friends than we've been heretofore
When we've got all we want, we're as quiet as can be
Where the Mountains o' Mourne sweep down to the sea.

You remember young Peter O'Loughlin, of course,
Well, now he is here at the head of the Force.
I met him today, I was crossing the Strand,
And he stopped the whole street with a wave of his hand.
And there we stood talkin' of days that are gone,
While the whole population of London looked on.
But for all these great powers he's wishful like me,
To be back where the dark Mournes sweep down to the sea.

There's beautiful girls here, oh, never you mind,
With beautiful shapes nature never designed,
And lovely complexions all roses and cream,
But let me remark with regard to the same
That if of those roses you ventured to sip,
The colours might all come away on your lip,
So I'll wait for the wild rose that's waiting for me
In the place where the dark Mourne sweep down to the sea.
