= CIÉ 501 Class =

F501 Class
Type and origin
- Power type: Diesel mechanical
- Builder: Walker Brothers, Wigan
- Serial number: D31–D33
- Build date: 1954
Specifications
- Configuration
  - UIC: B′B′
- Gauge: 3 ft (914 mm)
- Driver dia.: 2 ft 3 in (0.686 m)
- Loco weight: 23.3 tonnes (22.9 long tons; 25.7 short tons)
- Prime mover: Two Gardner
- Engine type: Diesel
- Transmission: Mechanical
- Train brakes: Vacuum
Performance figures
- Power output: 2 x 224 hp (167 kW)
- Tractive effort: Starting: 46 kN (10,341 lbf)
Career
- Operators: CIÉ
- Number in class: 3
- Numbers: Originally C31-C33, → 500-502, renumbered in 1957 to 501-503
- Locale: West Clare Railway
- Withdrawn: 1961 (on closure of West Clare Railway)
- Disposition: All scrapped, 1968

The Córas Iompair Éireann 501 Class locomotives were built in 1955 by Walker Brothers of Wigan for use on the narrow gauge (3 ft or 914 mm) lines on the West Clare section of the CIÉ. They were small diesel mechanical locomotives, with a 0-4-0+0-4-0 wheel arrangement. Controlled from a central cab, the locomotives had two Gardner engines of 224 hp (167 kW), one under each end casing, driving through a fluid coupling and Wilson gear box the inner axle of the opposite bogie, through a spiral-bevel-reverse and reduction gear box. Unusually the locomotives were driven from a seat mounted sideways to the direction of travel giving a clear field of vision both ways by a mere turn of the head.

The locomotives were fitted with vacuum brakes, emergency braking coming from a "deadman's" pedal, one at the driving position and two others, one mounted on each side of the cab. When used on freight services their maximum speed was 40 kilometres per hour (25 mph), but with an overdrive fitted, released by a key, this was raised to 51 kilometres per hour (32 mph) for passenger trains.

== History ==
They were originally numbered C31-C33 in the West Clare steam locomotive series, but were subsequently renumbered into the diesel locomotive series as F501-F503. They were withdrawn in 1961 when the West Clare lines were closed and stored at Inchicore Works for seven years. The Isle of Man Railway made an offer for the locomotives which was rejected by CIÉ, who subsequently made less money by selling them for scrap in 1968.

== Model ==
The Walker 501 Class has been made as a 00n3 scale 12mm gauge brass kit by Worsley Works Models
