= The Mary Wallopers (album) =

Studio album by The Mary Wallopers
- Released: 28 October 2022
- Length: 38:50
- Label: BC Records

The Mary Wallopers chronology
The Mary Wallopers (2022)	Irish Rock n' Roll (2023)

Singles from The Mary Wallopers
- 1. "Frost Is All Over" Released: 23 August 2022; 2. "Cod Liver Oil and the Orange Juice" Released: 29 September 2022

Professional ratings
Review scores
Source	Rating
The Irish Times	4/5 stars
Spill Magazine	4.5/5 stars

The Mary Wallopers is the debut studio album by Irish band The Mary Wallopers. It was released on 28 October 2022, by BC Records.

== Track listing ==
The Mary Wallopers track listing
No.	Title	Writer(s)	Length
1.	"Eileen Óg"	Trad Arr. The Mary Wallopers	3:01
2.	"Love Will Never Conquer Me"	Unknown	2:29
3.	"Cod Liver Oil & The Orange Juice"	Ron Clark and Carl MacDougall	4:19
4.	"John O’Halloran"	Seán McCarthy	2:53
5.	"The Hackler"	Trad Arr. Christy Moore	3:43
6.	"The Night the Guards Raided Owenys"	Unknown	5:33
7.	"Building Up and Tearing England Down"	Trad	4:50
8.	"Lots of Little Soldiers"	Barry Dransfield	2:39
9.	"Frost Is All Over"	Trad Arr. The Dubliners	3:11
10.	"The Butcher Boy"	Trad Arr. The Clancy Brothers & Tommy Makem	4:05
11.	"All For Me Grog"	Trad Arr. The Dubliners	2:07

== Charts ==
Chart performance for The Mary Wallopers
Chart (2022–2023)	Peak position
Irish Albums (Official Charts)	28
Scottish Albums (Official Charts)	30
UK Album Downloads (Official Charts)	18
UK Folk Albums (Official Charts)	3
UK Independent Albums (Official Charts)	14
