= Slattery's Mounted Foot =

Song written in 1889 by Percy French

The lyrics to the song "Slattery's Mounted Foot" (also known as "Slattery's Mounted Fut", "Slattery's Light Dragoons", and "O'Slattery's Light Dragoons") were written in 1889 by the 19th century Irish musician Percy French. The song is representative of French's comic works. The tune of the chorus differs from that of the main lyrics.

== Lyrics ==
"Slattery's Mounted Foot"
by Percy French (1889)

You've heard of Julius Caesar and the great Napoleon too,
And how the Cork Militia beat the Turks at Waterloo;
But there's a page of glory that as yet remains uncut,
And that's the warlike story of bold Slattery's Mounted Fut.

This gallant corps was organised by Slattery's eldest son,
A noble-minded poacher with a double-breasted gun.
And many a head was broken, aye, and many an eye was shut,
When practising maneuvers in bold Slattery's Mounted Fut.

Chorus
And down from the mountains came the squadrons and platoons,
Four-and-twenty fighting men and a couple of stout gossoons;
When going into action held each musket by the butt,
We sang this song and marched along with Slattery's Mounted Fut.

Well, first we reconnoitred 'round O'Sullivan's Shebeen—
It used to be the shop house but we called it the canteen;
And there we saw a notice which the bravest heart unnerved:
"All liquor must be settled for before the drink is served."

So on we marched, but soon again each warrior's heart grew pale,
For rising high in front of us we saw the county jail;
And when the army faced about, 'twas just in time to find,
A couple of stout policemen had surrounded us behind.

Chorus
And down from the mountains came the squadrons and platoons,
Four-and-twenty fighting men and a couple of stout gossoons.
When going into action held each musket by the butt
We sang this song and marched along with Slattery's mounted fut.

"We'll cross the ditch," our leader cried, "and take the foe in flank";
But yells of consternation then arose from every rank;
For posted high upon a tree we very plainly saw:
"Trespassers prosecuted, in accordance with the law".

"We're foiled again!" said Slattery, "here ends our bold campaign,
'Tis merely throwing life away to face that raging drain;
I'm not as bold as lions but I'm braver than a hen,
And he that fights and runs away will live to fight again."

Chorus
So back to the mountains went the squadrons and platoons,
Four-and-twenty fighting men and a couple of stout gossoons.
When going into action held each musket by the butt,
We sang this song and marched along with Slattery's mounted Fut.

We reached the mountains safely, though all stiff and sore with cramp.
Each took a whet of whiskey nate to dissipate the damp;
And when they loaded all their pipes, bold Slattery ups and said:
Today's immortal fight will be remembered by the dead."

"I never shall forget," says he, "while this brave heart shall beat,
The eager way you followed when I headed the retreat.
Ye preferred the soldier's maxim, when desisting from the strife:
'Best be a coward for five minutes than a dead man all your life.'"

Chorus
And back to the mountains came the squadrons and platoons,
Four and twenty fighting men and a couple of stout gossoons,
When going into action held each musket by the butt,
We sang this song and marched along with Slattery's Mounted Fut!

Alternative lyrics for the chorus are:

And down from the mountains came the squadrons and platoons,
Four-and-twenty fighting men and a couple of stout gossoons,
When going into action held each musket by the butt,
We sang a song as we marched along with Slattery's Mounted Foot!

Alternative ending for the chorus:

And down from the mountains came the squadrons and platoons,
Four-and-twenty fighting men and a couple of stout gossoons,
Said Slattery we must march against these blithering buffoons,
Through all the fame we killed the name of Slattery's Light Dragoons!
