= Walker Brothers (Wigan) =

Walker Brothers: Manufacturer (England)

- Founded: 1886
- Founder: John Scarisbrick Walker
- Headquarters: Wigan, England
- Products: Steam locomotives Diesel locomotives Railcars; Trucks

Walker Brothers Limited was a manufacturer based in Pagefield Ironworks, Wigan, England. It produced ventilation equipment for mining, truck and bus chassis (under the "Pagefield" name), mobile cranes, and railway locomotives and railcars.

== History ==
In 1886, John Scarisbrick Walker established Globe Foundry in Wigan. He was later joined by brothers Thomas and Edwin and the business renamed Walker Brothers. Initially based in Queen Street, it moved to Pagefield Works in 1874. It initially manufactured steam locomotives before diversifying in the 1930s to produce diesel locomotives and railcars. It closed in the early 1960s. In 1949 in became part of Walmsley's Bury Group, operating as Walmsley's Wigan Ltd to produce papermaking machinery.

== Products ==
=== Pagefield Trucks ===
In 1907, Walker Brothers started building petrol trucks using the Pagefield name. At the Manchester Commercial Vehicle show in 1908, their 30 to 40 long hundredweight (1.5–2.0 t) unit was the only petrol-driven commercial vehicle. In 1911, Walkers announced three new models: 40 long hundredweight (2 t), 50 long hundredweight (2.5 t) and 3 ton. All the trucks had four-cylinder petrol engines built by Pagefield, and all had a chain drive to the rear axle.

In 1913, a Pagefield truck was revealed, which had been designed to meet the requirements of the War Office Subsidy Scheme. It used the Dorman 4JO engine, and replaced the chain final drive with a live axle and prop shaft. That model was certified under the scheme and, when World War I broke out, it meant Pagefield was one of the makers able to provide the War Office with approved vehicles, which continued throughout the war.

In 1920, Pagefield launched a new motor coach chassis, using a Dorman subsidy-type engine, claiming: "You don't put Passengers on Freight Under-Carriages", because it was not uncommon at the time to sell commercial chassis for either freight or passenger use.

An interesting new vehicle at the 1923 commercial vehicle show was a 3.5 ton Pagefield, with forward control, and a wheelbase of only 8 ft 2 in (2.49 m). Around 1923/1924, Walkers was also developing refuse collection wagons, involving horse-drawn wagons collecting rubbish from houses and delivering it to a Pagefield truck, which took it to the local dump, returning for the next load.

In 1930, Pagefield introduced a 6-ton truck, the Pagefield NG, with a 4-cylinder Gardner diesel engine of 5.6 litres.

Walkers produced refuse wagons from the mid-1920s, which became an important part of their product line. Launched in 1932, the Pagefield Prodigy was a refuse truck with forward control and a cab that could accommodate the crew. It was available either with a Gardner diesel engine, or a Meadows petrol engine. The body design had features owned by County Commercial Cars Ltd and, in 1947, their long-standing business arrangement was formalised by the creation of Walkers and County Cars Ltd.

It also produced a 6-wheeler from 1933, called the Pegasix, using the Gardner 5LW diesel engine.

After World War II, a Pagefield 5-ton truck with Perkins P6 diesel engine designed for export was announced. Walker Bros dropped the use of the Pagefield trademark about that time, and a crane truck the firm built in the early 1950s was simply referred to as the Walker 6-ton crane.

=== Locomotives ===
- CIE 501 Class: 3

=== Railcars ===
Between 1932 and 1953, Walker Brothers produced the following railcars:

- Clogher Valley Railway, Ireland: 1
- County Donegal Railways Joint Committee, Ireland: 8
- Great Northern Railway, Ireland: 7
- Emu Bay Railway, Australia: 1
- São Paulo Railway Company, Brazil: 4
- Sligo, Leitrim and Northern Counties Railway, Ireland: 1
- Victorian Railways Walker railmotor: 64
- Peruvian Corporation, Peru: 12
- Coras Iompair Eireann, Ireland: 4
- Cyrenaica Railways, Libya: 1
