= Annie Patterson =

Irish composer and author

Annie Wilson Patterson (27 October 1868 – 16 January 1934) was an Irish organist, music educator, writer, composer, and arranger.

== Life ==
Annie Patterson was born in Lurgan, County Armagh, Ireland, and was related through her mother's family to Lord Macaulay. She made her debut performance in Dublin at age fifteen, studied at Alexandra College and the Royal Irish Academy of Music in Dublin (with Robert Prescott Stewart), and received her doctorate in 1889, becoming the first Irish or British woman to hold a Doctorate of Music. After she completed her studies, she became an examiner for the Royal University of Ireland and worked as an organist and conductor of the Dublin Choral Union and the Hampstead Harmonic Society. In 1897 she co-founded the Feis Ceoil festival in Dublin. The Dr. Annie Patterson Medal is awarded in her honor at the festival. In 1909 Patterson took a job as organist at St. Anne's in Shandon, County Cork.

Patterson composed sacred and secular cantatas, orchestral works and songs based on Irish themes. She also wrote poetry, essays, short stories as well as professional articles and books on music. She published articles in The Girl's Own Paper in England and a series of articles on music in the Weekly Irish Times from 1899 to 1901. She published ten books, including a text on Irish folk music and a biography of Robert Schumann for the Master Musician's Series. In 1924, she succeeded Carl Hardebeck as a lecturer on Irish music in the Music Department of University College Cork, where she worked until her death in 1934.

== Compositions ==
- Six Original Gaelic songs (London: Boosey & Co., 1896)
- Go mairidh ár nGaedhilg slán. Rallying song of the Gaelic League (Dublin: Connradh na Gaedhilge, 1905)
- Red Hugh, or Life and Death of Hugh Roe O'Donnell, Lord of Tyrconnaill. A Drama in Three Acts with music of the song of victory after the battle of the yellow ford [etc.] (Dublin: M.H. Gill & Son, 1905)
- Ivernia. An Arrangement of Irish Airs for Pianoforte (London: Novello & Co., 1911)
- The Bells of Shandon. Part Song for S. A. T. B. (London: Boosey & Co., 1914)
- Ireland for ever. Irish March Song (Chorus) (London: Novello & Co., 1919)
- A Lay of Spring. Song (London: Novello & Co., 1921)
- Once in Olden Time. A Christmas Carol (London: Novello & Co., 1921)
- Brothers. Choral March-Song (London: Duff, Stewart & Co., 1924)
- Traditional Irish Airs, vol. 1 (Dublin: Browne & Nolan, 1924), vol. 2 (1925)
- The Jolly Ploughboy. From the Bunting Collection, Arranged for S. A. T. B. (London & Glasgow: Bayley & Ferguson, 1928)
- King Cormac. A Musical Monograph on Irish Folk-Song from the O'Neill Collection, in prelude and fugue form for Pianoforte. Op. 35. No. 1 (Dublin: Pigott & Co., 1928)

== Writings ==
- The Story of Oratorio (London & New York: Walter Scott Publishing Co., 1902)
- Chats with Music Lovers (London, 1905)
- Schumann (London: J.M. Dent & Co, 1908)
- Beautiful Song and the Singer. An Appreciation of the Methods of Jenny Lind (Dublin: Hely's, 1909)
- How to Listen to an Orchestra (London: Hutchinson & Co., 1913)
- The Profession of Music and How to Prepare for it (London: Wells Gardner & Co., 1926)
