= Michael Joseph Barry =

Irish poet and political figure

Michael Joseph Barry (c. 1817 – 23 January 1889) was an Irish poet, writer, and political figure.

== Life and career ==
Born in Cork, Ireland, Barry was imprisoned in 1843 as a Young Irelander. That year an 1843 essay on repeal won the Repeal Association prize. He published his Kishoge Papers in Dublin University Magazine anonymously, later as "Bouillon de Garçon." He also published under the names "B.", "B.J.", "Beta", and "Brutus".

He recanted his early political views late in life and became a police magistrate in Dublin.

== Works ==
Books included:

- A Waterloo Commemoration
- Echoes from Parnassus
- Lays of the War
- Six Songs of a Beranger
- Heinrich and Leonore, an Alpine Story
- Ireland, as She Was, as She Is, and as She Shall Be
- Irish Emigration Considered
- Songs of Ireland (editor with Thomas Osborne Davis)
