= The Mary Wallopers =

Irish folk group

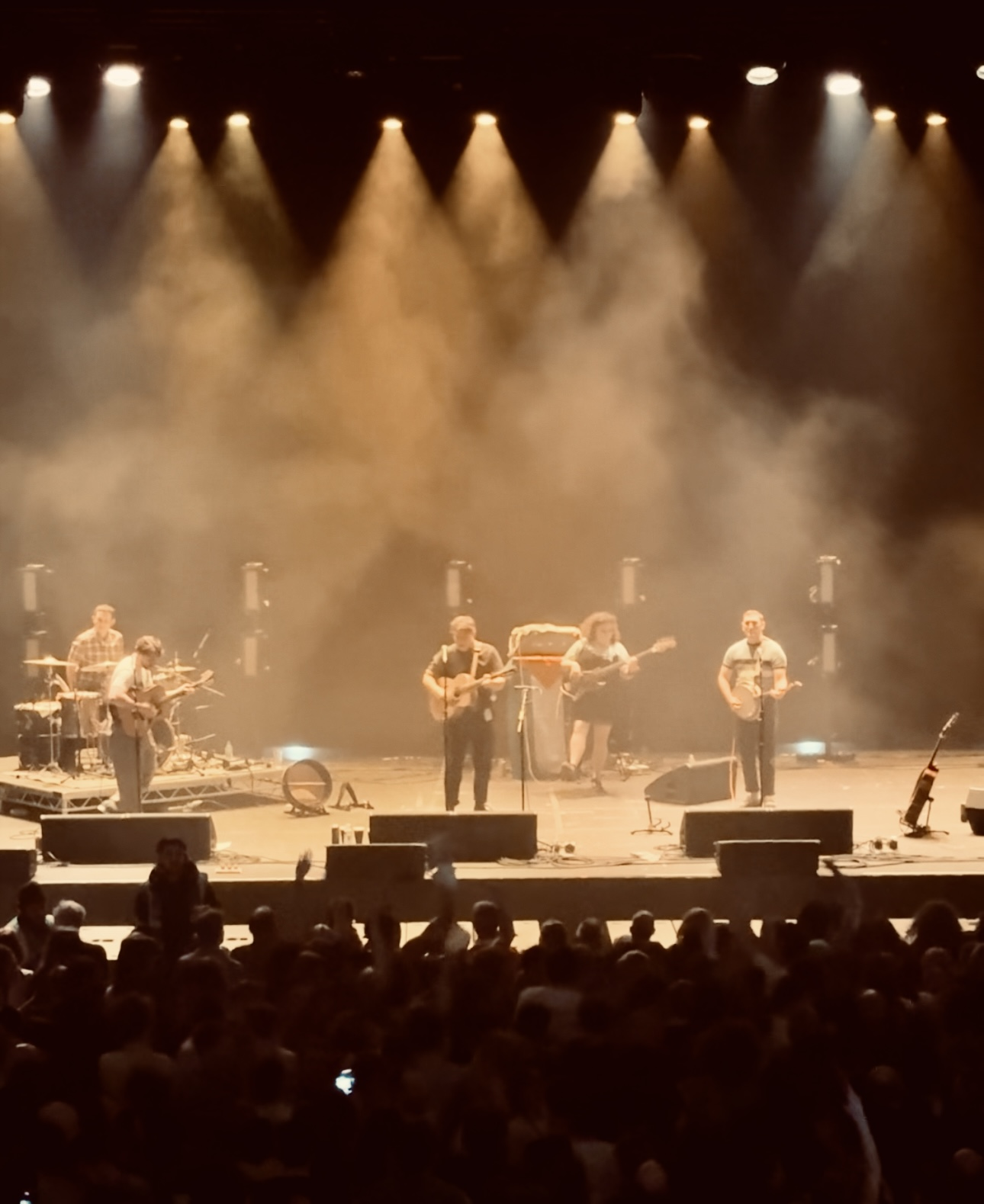
- The Mary Wallopers performing in 2024

Background information
- Also known as: TPM
- Origin: Dundalk, County Louth, Ireland
- Genres: Irish folk; folk punk
- Years active: 2019–present
- Label: BC Records
- Members: Charles Hendy; Andrew Hendy; Róisín "Mary" Barrett; Ken Mooney; Finnian O'Connor; Catriona Ní Ghribín (Catriona Gribben)
- Past members: Brendan McInerney; Seamas Hyland; Seán McKenna
- Website: www.marywallopers.com

The Mary Wallopers are an Irish folk music group based in Dundalk, County Louth, originally consisting of brothers Charles and Andrew Hendy, and Seán McKenna. In 2022 the group expanded to include Róisín Barrett on bass, Brendan McInerney on drums, Seamas Hyland on accordion, and Finnian O'Connor on tin whistle and uilleann pipes. In late 2023, Hyland left to concentrate on his own music. McInerney had previously been replaced by Ken Mooney of The Urges. In March 2025, founding member Seán McKenna announced his departure to pursue his own music. In 2026, the group was joined by Donegal accordion player / multi-instrumentalist and song scholar Catriona Ní Ghribín (Catriona Gribben).

== Background ==
Charles Hendy has stated that the band's biggest thematic influence has been "reactionary stuff to poverty", while the band credit Jinx Lennon as being among their biggest musical influences. The Hendy brothers knew Seán McKenna from school, where an image of Irish revolutionary James Connolly on his schoolbag attracted Charles' attention.

The Mary Wallopers cultivated a large fanbase following their gigs they live-streamed from the Hendys' home during COVID-19 lockdowns. Writing in The Guardian, critic Dan Hancox said the livestreamed gigs "immediately captured a mood, and an audience: providing the connection and warmth we were all missing, cracking jokes, singing, and swearing like dockers".

== Protests and activism ==
The band are well known for their opposition to far-right and anti-immigration politics, and their support for the liberation of Palestine. They went viral in May 2020 when they met a far-right anti-5g protest with a counter-protest, donning tinfoil hats and posing as "Dundalk Against Change" with the slogan "Bring Back Dial-Up: the internet is too fast!". In November 2023, the band performed alongside Damien Dempsey, Lankum, Lisa O'Neill and Pauline Scanlon as part of the Gig for Gaza at the 3Arena, a concert which raised funds for medical equipment for Palestinians in Gaza. In July 2024, they led chants at an anti-fascist protest in Dundalk held following an arson attack on migrant accommodation.

On 22 August 2025, the band's set was cut off and cancelled after two minutes at Victorious Festival in Portsmouth, England after they came on stage with a Palestinian flag. Some of the audience chanted "let them play". A video posted on Instagram by the group appeared to show a member of staff telling the band that they would only be allowed to perform if they removed the Palestinian flag. The band refused. Belfast rap trio Kneecap expressed support for the Mary Wallopers in a tweet. Several bands due to appear then pulled out of the festival in a boycott, including The Academic and The Last Dinner Party.

== Musical style ==
Their first album, the self-titled The Mary Wallopers, has been described as "raucous, fun and captivating". It is seen as having been influenced by The Pogues and Lankum, as well as embodying the "divilment" and "blackguarding" of The Dubliners. John Sheahan of the Dubliners disparaged the band as "mediocre musicians and singers" in a 2024 interview after playing with them on RTÉ.

In a review for RTÉ of their second album, Irish Rock N Roll, Alan Corr described the band as "Irish trad punks". The album, though described as bawdy (and of consisting of "songs about drinkin' and ridin'"), is praised as vibrant and funny. Commenting in The Irish Times on their performance at the All Together Now festival, Ed Power remarked that "the material at times has an almost uncanny folk-horror quality".

== TPM ==
The Hendy brothers have also performed as TPM, a comedy rap duo that are explicitly political, and like The Mary Wallopers, are anti-capitalist. "TPM" is shorthand for "Taxpayer's Money". TPM rose to prominence in 2015 following the viral sharing of a recording of their first song, "All the Boys on the Dole".

== Discography ==
Albums

- The Mary Wallopers (28 October 2022)
- Irish Rock N Roll (13 October 2023)
- Paddywhackery (18 September 2026)

Singles and EPs

- A Mouthful of the Mary Wallopers (6 July 2019)
- Home Boys Home (21 June 2024)
- The Juice (25 July 2025)

Other

- For the People (the band appears on one song on the Dropkick Murphys album)
