= Brendan O'Dowda =

Irish singer

Brendan O'Dowda

Brendan O'Dowda (1 October 1925 – 22 February 2002) was an Irish tenor who popularised the songs of Percy French.

== Early life ==
O'Dowda was born in Dundalk, County Louth and was educated at the De la Salle Brothers' school in the town. His early promise as a singer brought him to the attention of Dr. Vincent O'Brien, who had coached tenor John McCormack. Under O'Brien's tutelage, O'Dowda developed a fine tenor voice of his own and began to perform at charity events throughout the country.

== Career ==
Although offered a career in opera, O'Dowda was drawn to popular music and, in the early 1950s, he moved to England in order to advance his prospects. There, he formed The Four Ramblers musical group with Val Doonican. Subsequently, he enjoyed solo success on BBC Radio, guesting on programmes such as Just A Song At Twilight and Music for You.

O'Dowda's first album, Emerald and Tartan, included two songs by Percy French. Such was its success that he followed it in 1958 with The Immortal Percy French, an album devoted entirely to the work of the Irish songwriter. From then on, O'Dowda became closely identified with French's songs. He created a one-man show around the life and work of Percy French. In 1981, his biography of the composer, The World of Percy French, was published.

O'Dowda enjoyed considerable international recognition. He toured the US, appearing on The Ed Sullivan Show. He appeared in the 1959 film Alive and Kicking as one of the three singers of the title song. He performed a duet with Ruby Murray on the soundtrack of the 1959 film Darby O'Gill and the Little People.

== Personal life and death ==
O'Dowda was married first to Sheila Kelly in 1948. They had one son. This marriage ended in divorce and O'Dowda later married June Nadine, a dancer with the Tiller girls, who bore him two sons. O'Dowda, having divorced June and obtained a Catholic annulment from his first wife, then married the dancer Alice Boyle with whom he had four children.

Brendan O'Dowda died in hospital near his home in Fareham, England at the age of 76, and is buried in Esker Cemetery, Lucan, Dublin. His grandson Callum O'Dowda is a professional footballer who plays for Hungarian club Ferencvaros and the Republic of Ireland national football team.
