= Percy French =

Irish composer and artist

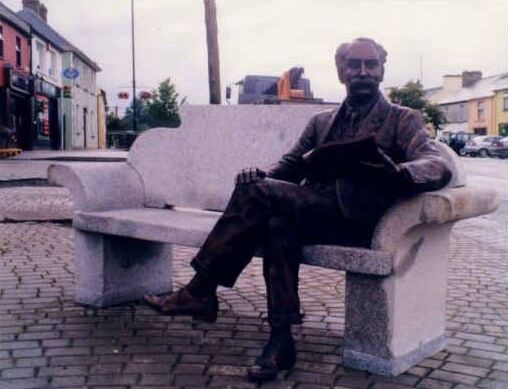
Bronze figure of Percy French in the main square of Ballyjamesduff

William Percy French (1 May 1854 – 24 January 1920) was an Irish songwriter, author, poet, entertainer and painter.

== Life ==
French was born at Clooneyquinn House, near Tulsk, County Roscommon, the son of an Anglo-Irish landlord, Christopher French, and Susan Emma French (née Percy). He was the third of nine children. His younger sister, Emily later Emily de Burgh Daly was also a writer.

He was educated in England at Kirk Langley and Windermere College before going to Foyle College in Derry and wrote his first successful song while studying at Trinity College Dublin (TCD) in 1877 for a smoking concert. The song, "Abdul Abulbul Amir", was published in 200 copies for £5 and French sold each copy for 2s6d, making a small fortune. However, he omitted to register the copyright on the song and lost all the subsequent income from the royalties as it was re-published without his name. The royalties were restored to his widow and daughters after his death. The song later became hugely popular and was falsely claimed by other authors.

Although he lost copyright, French always claimed authorship and did so on the sleeve of his song "Slattery's Mounted Fut" (1889) and in every issue of the weekly The Jarvey. Brendan O'Dowda claimed to have discovered, via the popularity of versions of the song at the American military academies in the 1980s, that French had written the lyrics while at Trinity College. He claimed responsibility for the restoration of the royalties in the 1980s. Ettie French gives a different account of how the royalties were restored in her book Willie (1995) about her father's life. She claimed the royalties were restored in the 1940s to the family. The ballad resembles a comic opera spoof. "Pot Skivers" were the chambermaids at the college, thus Ivan "Potschjinski" Skivar would be a less than noble prince, and as Bulbul is an Arabic dialectic name of the nightingale, Abdul was thus a foppish "nightingale" amir (prince). When French died, not at all wealthy, he was owed a fortune in unpaid royalties. A windfall in royalties came to his family in the 1940s from "Abdullah Abulbul Ameer" and "Phil the Fluter's Ball".

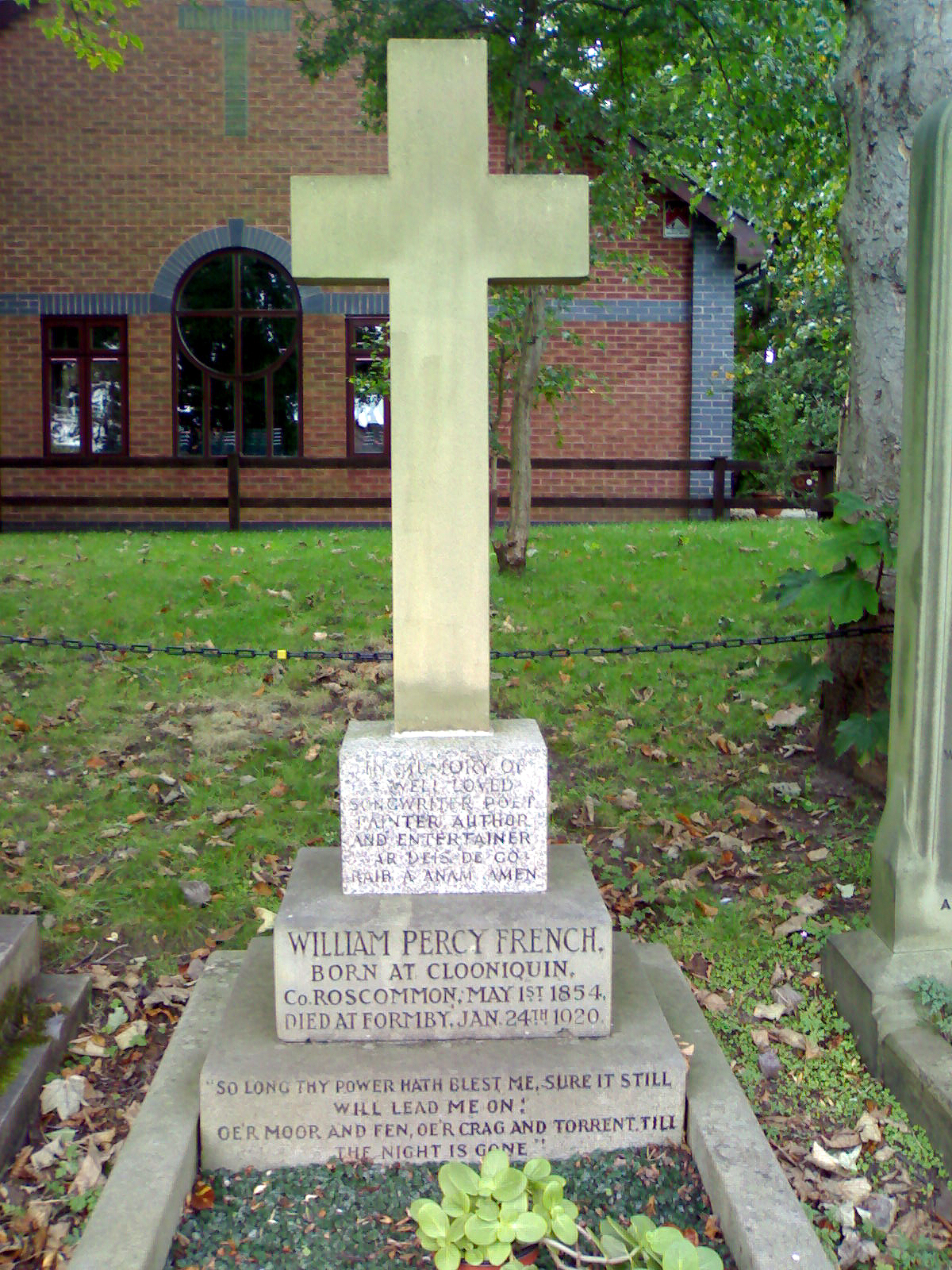
Percy French's grave at St Luke's Church, Formby

French graduated from TCD first being conferred with a BA degree in 1885 as a civil engineer in 1880 and after a stint as an apprentice engineer on the Midlands Railway with fellow entertainer Charles Mansergh (later Charles Manners of the Moody-Manners Opera Company) French joined the Board of Works in County Cavan as an Inspector of Drains in 1883. While in Trinity French won five out of six watercolour prizes and he became a member of the Dublin Sketching Club in 1876. It is said that he wrote his best songs during his Cavan period. He also painted copiously and established a sketching club and a comic troupe The Kinnepottle Komics in Cavan. During this period, he considered art to be his true vocation. In fact, when he became well-known later in his life, his paintings from his time as a civil engineer became fashionable and sought after. The volcano Krakatoa erupted in 1883 while French was in Cavan, and the particles of volcanic ash caused dramatic sunsets all over the world. French painted some of his finest landscapes in this period as he captured the spectacular skies. French exhibited his pictures in the Royal Hibernian Academy (RHA) and sometimes gave them short lyrical poems for titles, such as "Only the sullen seas that flow/ And ebb forever more,/ But tarry awhile sad heart and, lo!/ A light on that lonely shore".

=== RJ Mecredy ===
When the Board of Works reduced its staff around 1888, French turned to journalism as the editor of The Jarvey, a weekly comic paper which was set up by RJ Mecredy. It ran for two years and contains 1,664 pages. French was an enthusiastic cyclist, who cycled all over the country with his art materials stopping to sketch and paint. He was good friends with "Arjay" Mecredy, and he contributed to The Irish Cyclist for 34 years. When Mecredy went on holiday, he asked French to stand in for him as editor of The Irish Cyclist magazine. French's fey sense of humour caused him to make facetious replies to the letters to the editor, and Mecredy returned to a storm of raging withdrawals of subscriptions. He offered to subvent French in a humorous magazine.

When The Jarvey failed, French's long and successful career as a songwriter and entertainer began. He had lived by the canal in Dublin at 35 Mespil Road before going to London in 1890. He famously wrote to his friends when he moved there: "We have come to live by the canal, do drop in". A granite seat was erected in 1988 on the canal near his home, dedicated to French. It was sponsored by the Oriel Gallery and bears another witticism of French's: "Remember me is all I ask, / And if that memory proves a task, forget".

French is mentioned twice by name in James Joyce's Finnegans Wake and his death in Liverpool is recorded on page 73-74 of "Finnegans Wake" as the passing of the giant Finn-Finnegan. His song 'Phil the Fluter's Ball' is referenced 26 times in the book and several other songs.

French was married twice. His first wife, Ethel Armitage-Moore contributed a regular weekly gossip and fashion column to The Jarvey as well as exceptionally beautiful drawings. She died a day after their first wedding anniversary on 29 June 1891 of complications connected to maternal sepsis and her baby daughter, also called Ethel, died some weeks later. She is buried in Mount Jerome cemetery and the baby is buried in the grounds of Elphin Cathedral. In November 1894, Helen Sheldon from Warwickshire became French's second wife, and they had three daughters. They lived from 1894 to 1900 at 35 Mespil Road and moved to St John's Wood London in 1900.

French is renowned today for composing and singing comic songs and gained considerable distinction with such songs as Phil the Fluther's Ball, Slattery's Mounted Foot, and The Mountains of Mourne (this last was one of several written with his friend, stage partner and fellow composer, Houston Collisson). In his professional stage career his shows included numerous nursery rhymes and an array od comic stage sketches, the most famous of which were "How Napoleon Failed to Set Fire to the Thames", "Doomed to the Dustbin" and "The Man Who Forgot He Was Dead". "The Mountains of Mourne" was set to the same air as Thomas Moore's "Bendmeer's Stream" which, in turn, was adapted from the old Irish Air "Carraigdhoun". French also wrote many sketches and amusing parodic recetations, the most famous of which is The Queen's After-Dinner Speech, written on the occasion of Queen Victoria's visit to Dublin in 1900, in which French drolly suggests "There's a slate off Willie Yeats". In addition, he wrote several poems, some he called "poems of pathos". Many of his poems and songs are on the theme of emigration. He remained a regular contributor to The Irish Cyclist, a weekly journal until his death and there as in "The Jarvey" his many parodies are to be found not least numerous parodies of Thomas Moore and Gilbert and Sullivan.

"Are Ye Right There Michael", a song ridiculing the state of the rail system in rural County Clare caused such embarrassment to the rail company that – according to a persistent local legend – it led to a libel action against French. According to the story, French arrived late at the court, and when questioned by the judge he responded "Your honour, I travelled by the West Clare Railway", resulting in the case being thrown out.

In January 1920, when he was 65 years old, French became ill while performing in Glasgow. He died from pneumonia in Formby, in the dioceses of Liverpool, England at the home of his cousin, Canon Richardson of Green Lea, College Avenue, on 24 January 1920. His grave is in the churchyard of St Luke's Church, Formby, Merseyside.

=== Memorials ===
In 1988, The Oriel Gallery sponsored a seat erected by the OPW opposite 35 Mespil Road, on the canal, Dublin. French lived there from 1894 to 1900 with his second wife and family. When he moved there, he sent out a communication to his friend: 'We have come to live by the canal, Do drop in!'

A sculpture of a park bench and plaque depicting his likeness by Brid Ni Rinn was installed on the spot where French was inspired to write "The Mountains of Mourne" in Red Island Park, Skerries, County Dublin, in 2008.

A statue of French sitting on a park bench in the town centre of Ballyjamesduff honours him and his song Come Back, Paddy Reilly, to Ballyjamesduff.

In March 2020, a memorial to French was unveiled in Newcastle, County Down, at the site of the Slieve Donard Hotel at the foot of the Mountains of Mourne, to mark the centenary of his death.

== Songs ==
The following songs are attributed to Percy French:

- Abdul Abulbul Amir (1877)
- Andy McElroe (1888)
- Are Ye Right There Michael? (1897)
- Come Back, Paddy Reilly, to Ballyjamesduff (1912)
- The Darlin' Girl from Clare
- Donegan's Daughter (1908)
- Drumcolligher
- Eileen Oge (The Pride of Petravore or McGrath the Cattle-Jobber)
- The Emigrants's Letter (Cutting the Corn in Creeslough) (1910)
- Father O'Callaghan (1910)
- Fighting McGuire
- Flanagan's Flying Machine (1911)
- The Fortunes of Finnegan
- The Girl on a Big Black Mare
- The Hoodoo (1910)
- I Fought a Fierce Hyena
- Jim Wheelahan's Automobeel
- The Kerry Courting (1909)
- The Killyran Wrackers (1914)
- Kitty Gallagher
- Larry Mick McGarry (1915)
- Little Brigid Flynn
- Maguire's Motor Bike (1906)
- The Mary Ann McHugh
- Mat Hannigan's Aunt (1892)
- McBreen's Heifer
- The Mountains of Mourne (1896)
- Mick's Hotel
- Mrs Brady (1907)
- Mulligan's Masquerade
- The Night that Miss Cooney Eloped
- No More of Yer Golfin' for Me (1906)
- The Oklahoma Rose (1910)
- Phil the Fluther's Ball
- Pretendy Land (1907)
- Rafferty's Racin' Mare (1906)
- A Sailor Courted a Farmer's Daughter (parody of the folk song)
- Slattery's Mounted Foot (1889)
- Sweet Marie
- Tullinahaw (1910)
- When Erin Wakes (1900)
- Whistlin' Phil McHugh
- Who Said the Hook Never Hurted the Worms?

== Operatic works ==
Collaborations with William Houston Collisson (1865–1920); Percy French wrote the texts/libretti, music by Collisson.

- The Knight of the Road (1891), later known as The Irish Girl (published c. 1918)
- Strongbow (1892)
- Midsummer Madness (1892)
- Noah's Ark (1906)
- Freda and the Fairies

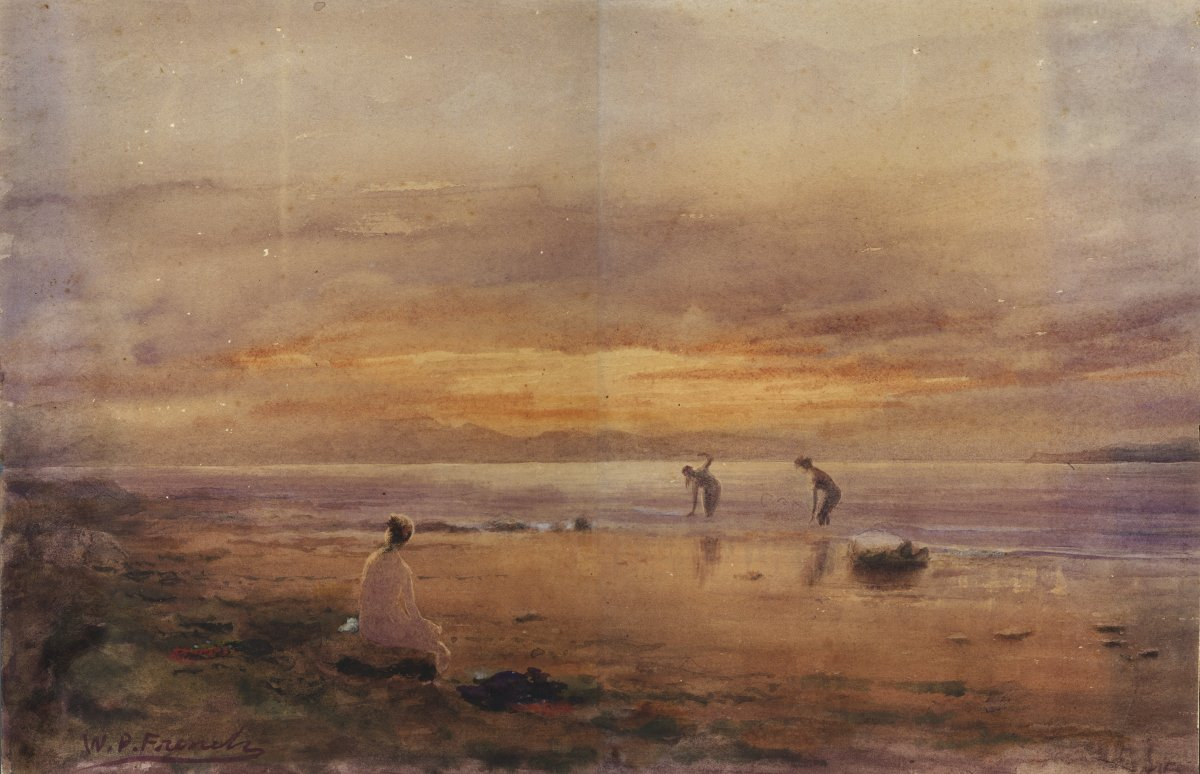
Mayo Mermaids

== Watercolours by Percy French and the Oriel Gallery ==
Artworks by French have increased in value. On 20 September 2005, the Percy French watercolour landscape Where ever I go my heart turns back to the County Mayo was sold by Dublin auctioneers Whyte's for a then-record price of €44,000. It is also known as "The Iveagh Percy French" as it came from the Guinness family collection. The story goes that the purchaser had "buyer's remorse", and the painting was purchased immediately by a gallerist. Some ten days after this auction, the Apollo Gallery sold this iconic painting on to an American collector for €65,000.

Oliver Nulty (d. 2005) established the Oriel Gallery in Clare Street, Dublin in 1868, which opened with a Percy French and George Russell exhibition. Nulty promoted French from the day he opened the gallery in 1968 and mounted at least 15 solo exhibitions of French and several group shows featuring French, one opened by Peter Ustinov. Nulty had been a collector for years before opening a gallery but he had a particularly fondness for French as his parents had met French in London in 1913 when they attended one of his matinees and met him afterwards. Nulty noticed that Irish visual art was neglected. He once witnessed that a George Russel had only been sold when a coal scuttle was thrown into the lot which sold for 2/6. As well as mounting several solo exhibitions of French's paintings he published several catalogues of French's watercolours. French's daughters, Joan and Ettie were regular visitors to the Oriel Gallery from the early 1970s and the gallery possesses their letters to Oliver. Peter Ustinov opened the 1986 French exhibition in the Oriel.

French's archive currently resides in the North Down Museum, Bangor, County Down where researchers are welcome to view material by appointment with the museum.

== Bibliography ==
- Emily de Burg Daly : Chronicles and Poems of Percy French, with an introduction by Katharine Tynan (Dublin: Talbot Press, 1922).
- Emily de Burg Daly Daly: Prose, Poems and Parodies of Percy French, with an introduction by Alfred Perceval Graves (Dublin: Talbot Press, 1929; 3/1962).
- James N. Healy: Percy French and his Songs (Cork: Mercier Press, 1966).
- Brendan O'Dowda: The World of Percy French (Belfast: Blackstaff Press, 1981; 3/1997).
- Alan Tongue: A Picture of Percy French (Belfast: Greystone Books, 1990).
- Ettie French: Willie: A Tribute to Percy French (Holywood, County Down: Percy French Society, 1994).
- Oliver Nulty (ed. by Bernadette Lowry): Lead Kindly Light. Celebrating 150 Years of Percy French (Dublin: Oriel Gallery Dublin Gallery, 2002).
- Berrie O'Neill: Tones that are Tender: Percy French, 1854–1920 (Dublin: Lilliput Press, 2016).

== See also ==
- Culture of Ireland
- Music of Ireland
