= Dublin =

Capital and largest city of Ireland

Dublin Baile Átha Cliath (Irish)
- Capital city
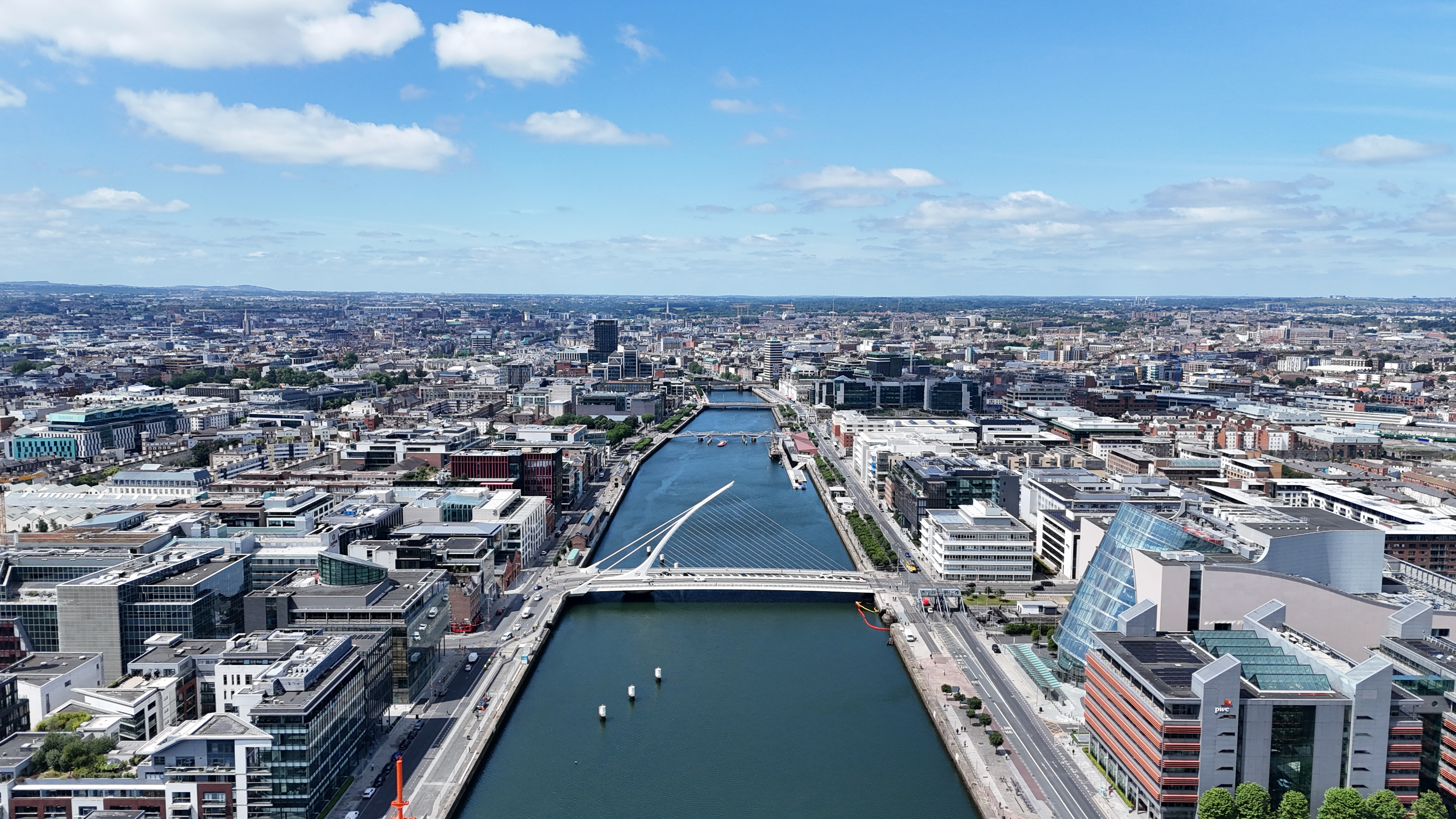
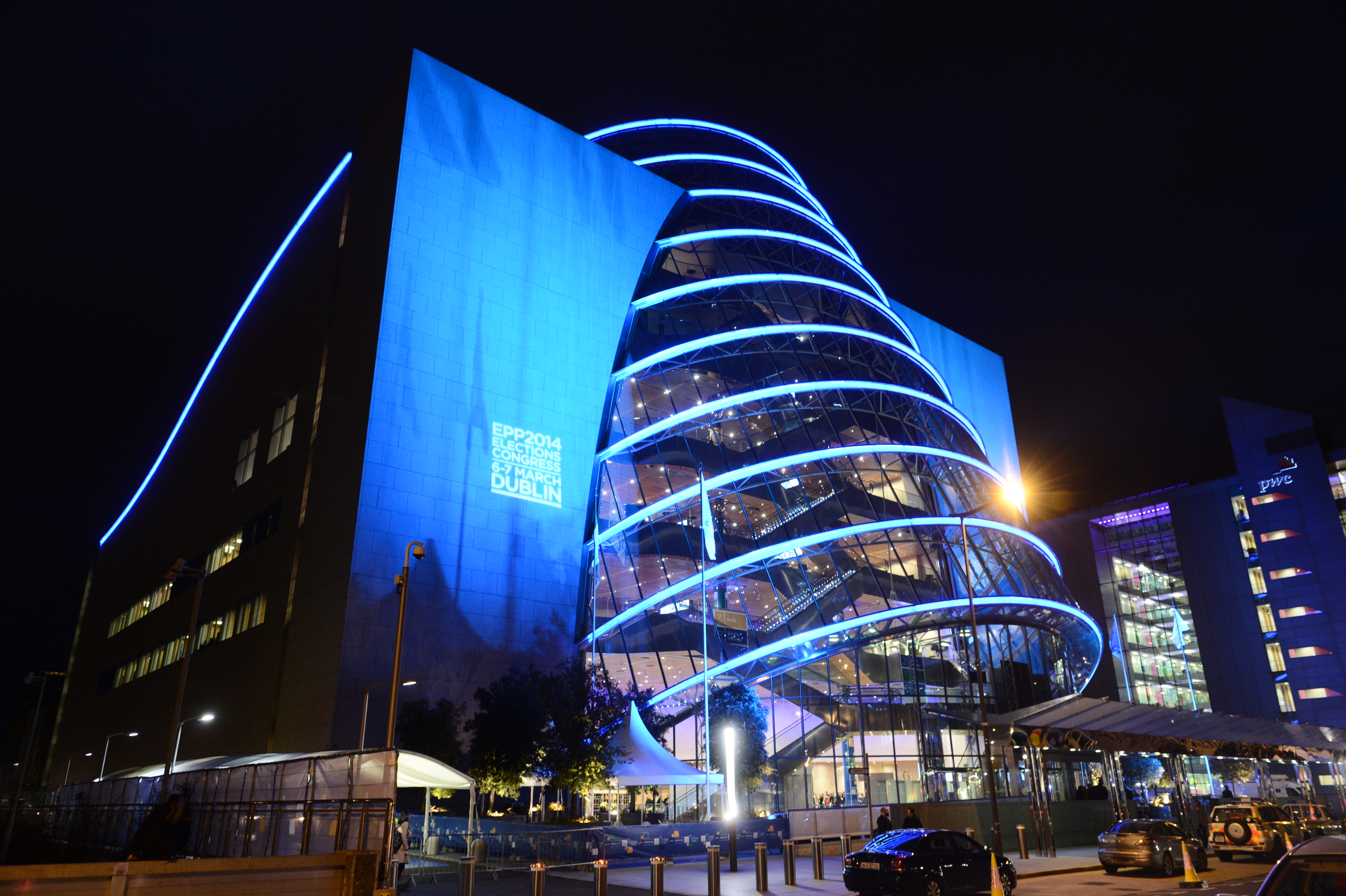
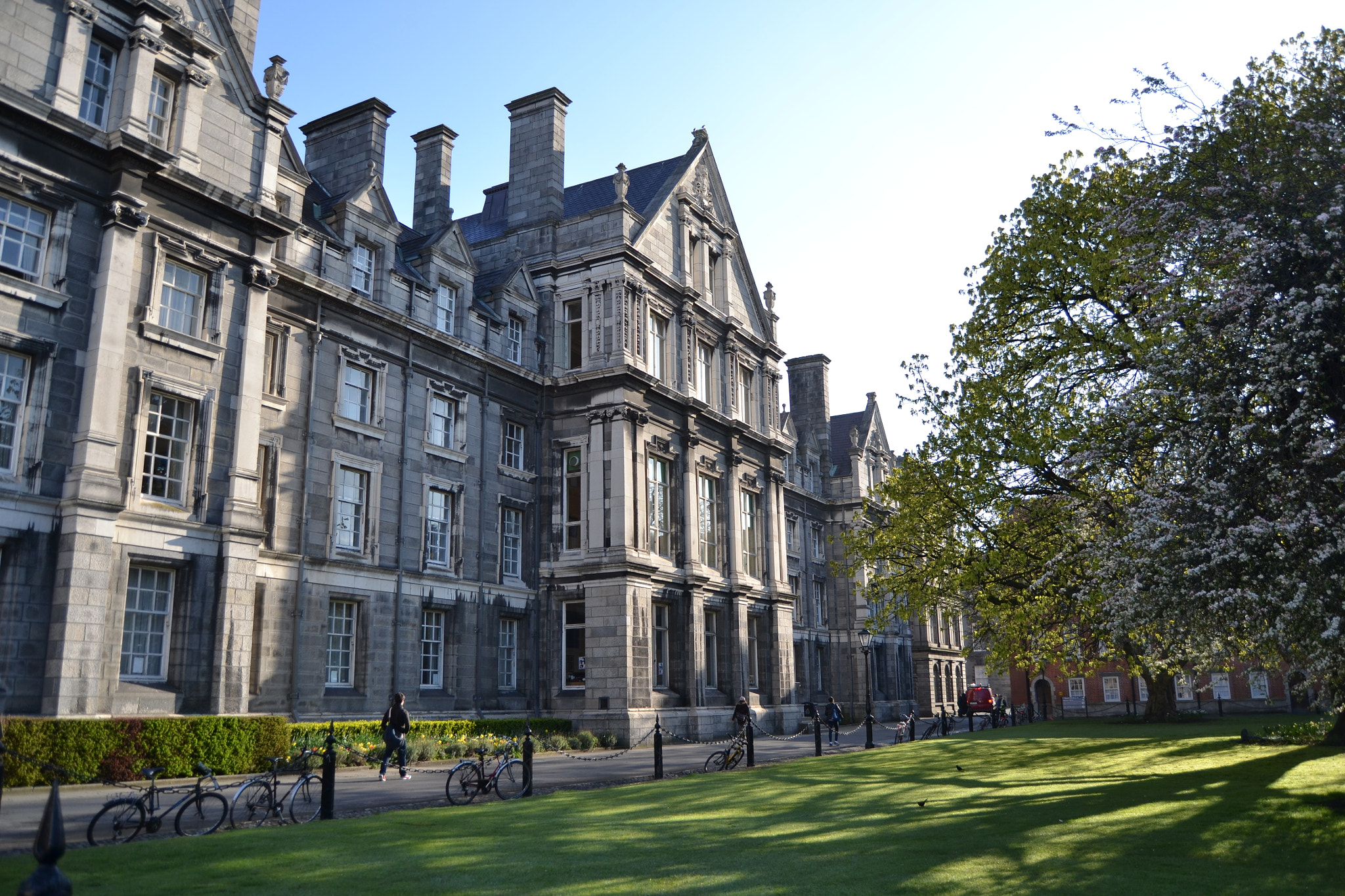
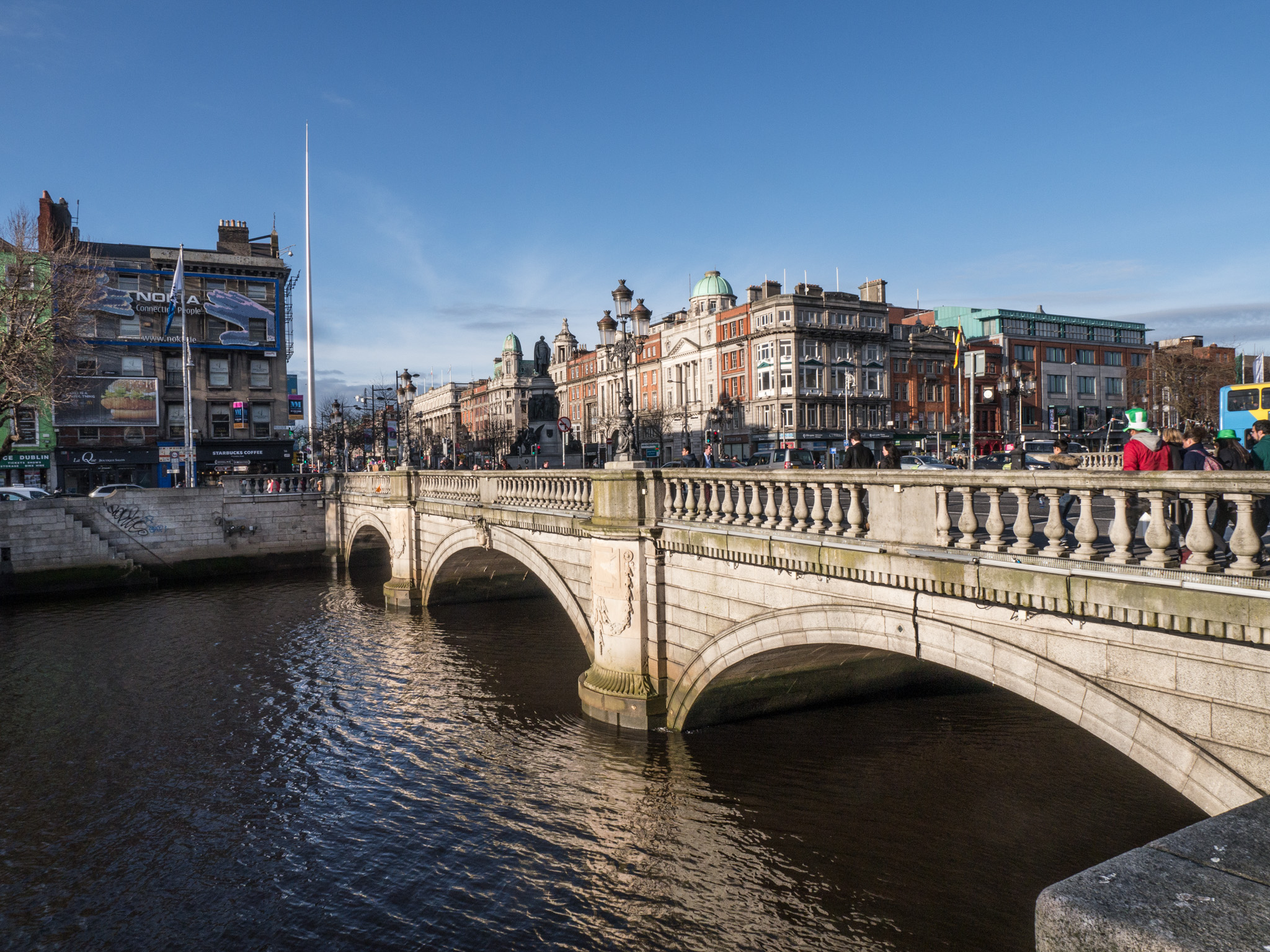
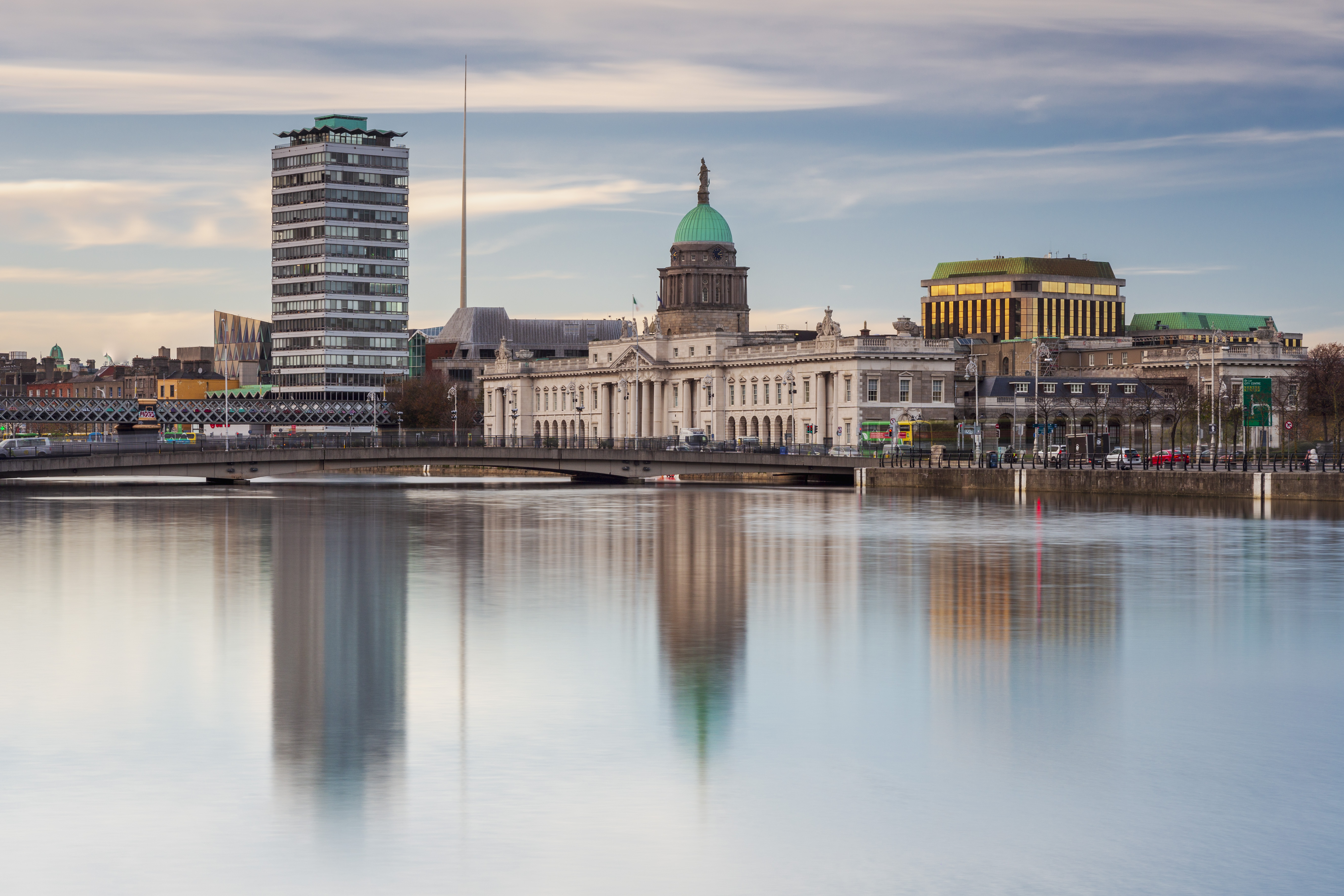
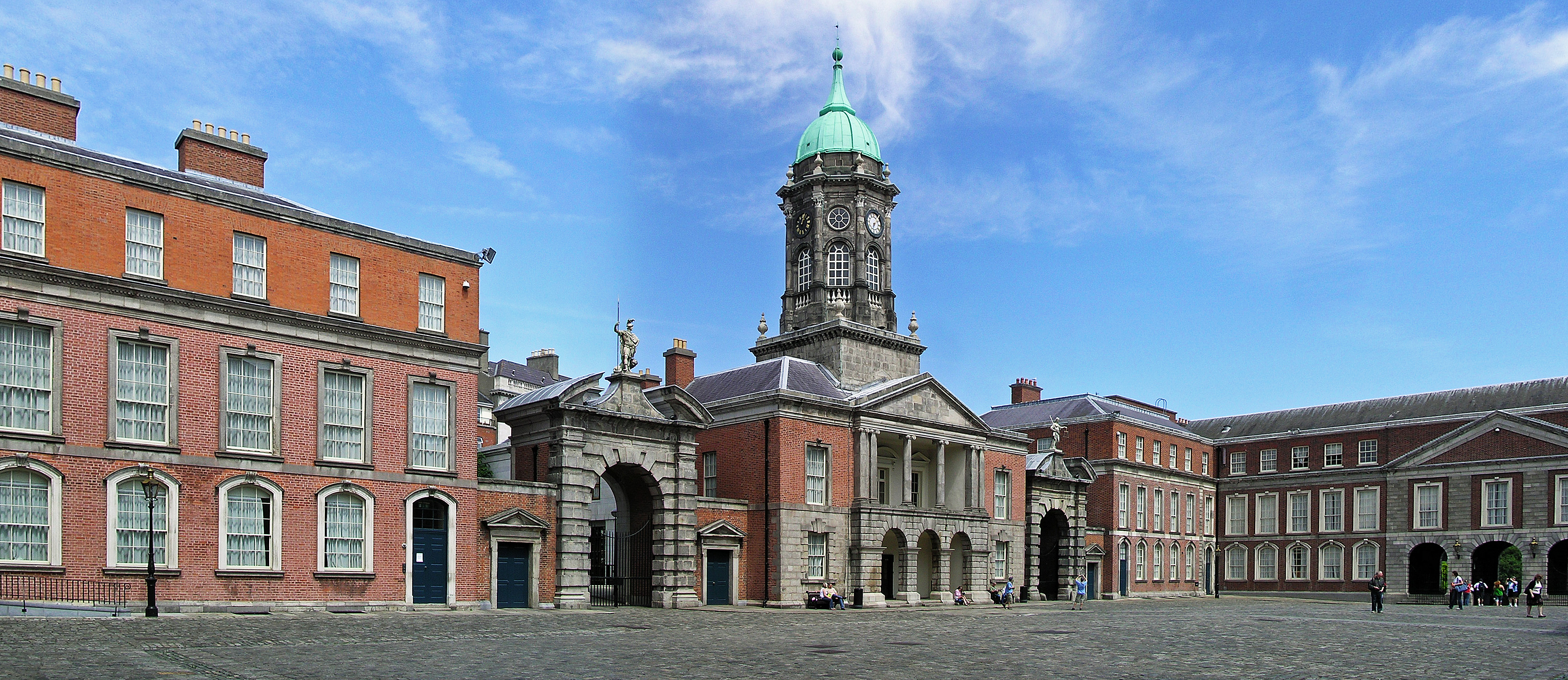
- The River Liffey and Samuel Beckett Bridge Convention Centre Trinity College O'Connell Bridge Custom House Dublin Castle

- Flag Coat of arms
- Nickname(s): The Fair City, BÁC
- Motto: Obedientia Civium Urbis Felicitas "The obedience of the citizens produces a happy city" Alternatively translated as "An obedient citizenry produces a happy city"
- Interactive map of Dublin
- Location within Ireland Location within Europe
- Coordinates: 53°21′00″N 06°15′37″W
- Country: Ireland
- Province: Leinster
- Region: Eastern and Midland
- County: Dublin
- Founded: Unknown

Government
  - Local authority: Dublin City Council
  - Headquarters: Dublin City Hall
  - Lord Mayor: Daryl Barron (Fianna Fáil)
  - Dáil constituencies: Dublin Central; Dublin Bay North; Dublin North-West; Dublin South-Central; Dublin Bay South
  - EP constituency: Dublin

Area
  - Capital city: 117.8 km^{2} (45.5 sq mi)
  - Urban: 345 km^{2} (133 sq mi)

Population (2022)
  - Capital city: 592,713
  - Rank: 1st
  - Density: 5,032/km^{2} (13,030/sq mi)
  - Urban (2024): 1,534,900
  - Urban density: 4,449/km^{2} (11,520/sq mi)
  - Ethnicity (Note: Ethnicity within the Dublin City Council local authority) (2022 census): Ethnic groups: 76.82% White; 64.24% White Irish; 12.19% White Other; 0.39% Irish Traveller; 5.11% Asian / Asian Irish; 1.58% Black / Black Irish; 3.50% Other /mixed; 12.98% Not stated
- Demonyms: Dubliner, Dub

GDP (Nominal, 2023)
  - Urban: €248.323 billion
  - Per capita: €165,405
- Time zone: UTC+00:00 (GMT)
  - Summer (DST): UTC+01:00 (IST)
- Eircode: D01 to D18, D20, D22, D24 & D6W
- Area code: 01 (+3531)
- ISO 3166 code: IE-D
- HDI (2023): 0.954(very high)
- Website: Official website

Dublin (Note: /ˈdʌblɪn/ DUB-lin; Irish: Baile Átha Cliath, pronounced [ˈbˠalʲə aːhə ˈclʲiə] or [ˌbʲlʲaː ˈclʲiə] – see § Etymology; abbr. BÁC pronounced [ˈbʲə aː ˈceː]) is the capital and largest city of Ireland. Situated on Dublin Bay at the mouth of the River Liffey, it is in the province of Leinster, and is bordered on the south by the Dublin Mountains, part of the Wicklow Mountains range. Dublin is the largest city by population on the island of Ireland; at the 2022 census, the city council area had a population of 592,713, while the city, including suburbs, had a population of 1,263,219, and County Dublin had a population of 1,501,500. Various definitions of a metropolitan Greater Dublin Area exist.

A settlement was established in the area by the Gaels during or before the 7th century, followed by the Vikings. As the Kingdom of Dublin grew, it became Ireland's principal settlement by the 12th century, following the Anglo-Norman invasion of Ireland. Dublin expanded rapidly from the 17th century and was briefly the second-largest city in the British Empire and sixth largest in Western Europe after the Acts of Union in 1800. Following independence in 1922, Dublin became the capital of the Irish Free State, renamed Ireland in 1937.

== Etymology ==
The name Dublin comes from the Middle Irish Du(i)blind (literally "Blackpool"), from dubh [d̪ˠuβˠ] "black, dark" and linn [l̠ʲin̠ʲ(dʲ)] "pool". This evolved into the Early Modern Irish form Du(i)bhlinn, which was pronounced "Duílinn" [ˈd̪ˠiːlʲin̠ʲ] in the local dialect. The name refers to a dark tidal pool on the site of the castle gardens at the rear of Dublin Castle, where the River Poddle entered the Liffey.

The Middle Irish pronunciation is preserved in the names for the city in other languages such as Old English Difelin, Old Norse Dyflin, modern Icelandic Dyflinn and modern Manx Divlyn as well as Welsh Dulyn and Breton Dulenn. Other localities in Ireland also bear the name Duibhlinn, variously anglicised as Devlin, Divlin and Difflin. Variations on the name are also found in traditionally Gaelic-speaking areas of Scotland, such as An Linne Dhubh ("the black pool"), which is part of Loch Linnhe.

The Viking settlement was preceded by a Christian ecclesiastical settlement known as Duibhlinn, from which Dyflin took its name. Beginning in the 9th and 10th centuries, there were two settlements where the modern city stands. The Viking settlement of about 841, Dyflin, and a Gaelic settlement, Áth Cliath ("ford of hurdles") further up the river, at the present-day Father Mathew Bridge, also known as Dublin Bridge, at the bottom of Church Street.

Baile Átha Cliath, meaning "town of the hurdled ford", is the common name for the city in Modern Irish, which is often contracted to Bleá Cliath or Blea Cliath when spoken. Áth Cliath is a place name referring to a fording point of the River Liffey near Father Mathew Bridge. Baile Átha Cliath was an early Christian monastery, believed to have been in the area of Aungier Street, currently occupied by Whitefriar Street Carmelite Church.

== History ==
Humans have inhabited the area of Dublin Bay since prehistoric times. Fish traps discovered from excavations during the construction of the Convention Centre Dublin indicate human habitation as far back as 6,000 years ago. Further traps were discovered closer to the old settlement of the city of Dublin on the south quays near St. James's Gate, which indicate mesolithic human activity.

Ptolemy's map of Ireland, of about 140 AD, provides possibly the earliest reference to a settlement near Dublin. Ptolemy, the Greco-Roman astronomer and cartographer, called it Eblana polis (Ancient Greek: Ἔβλανα πόλις).

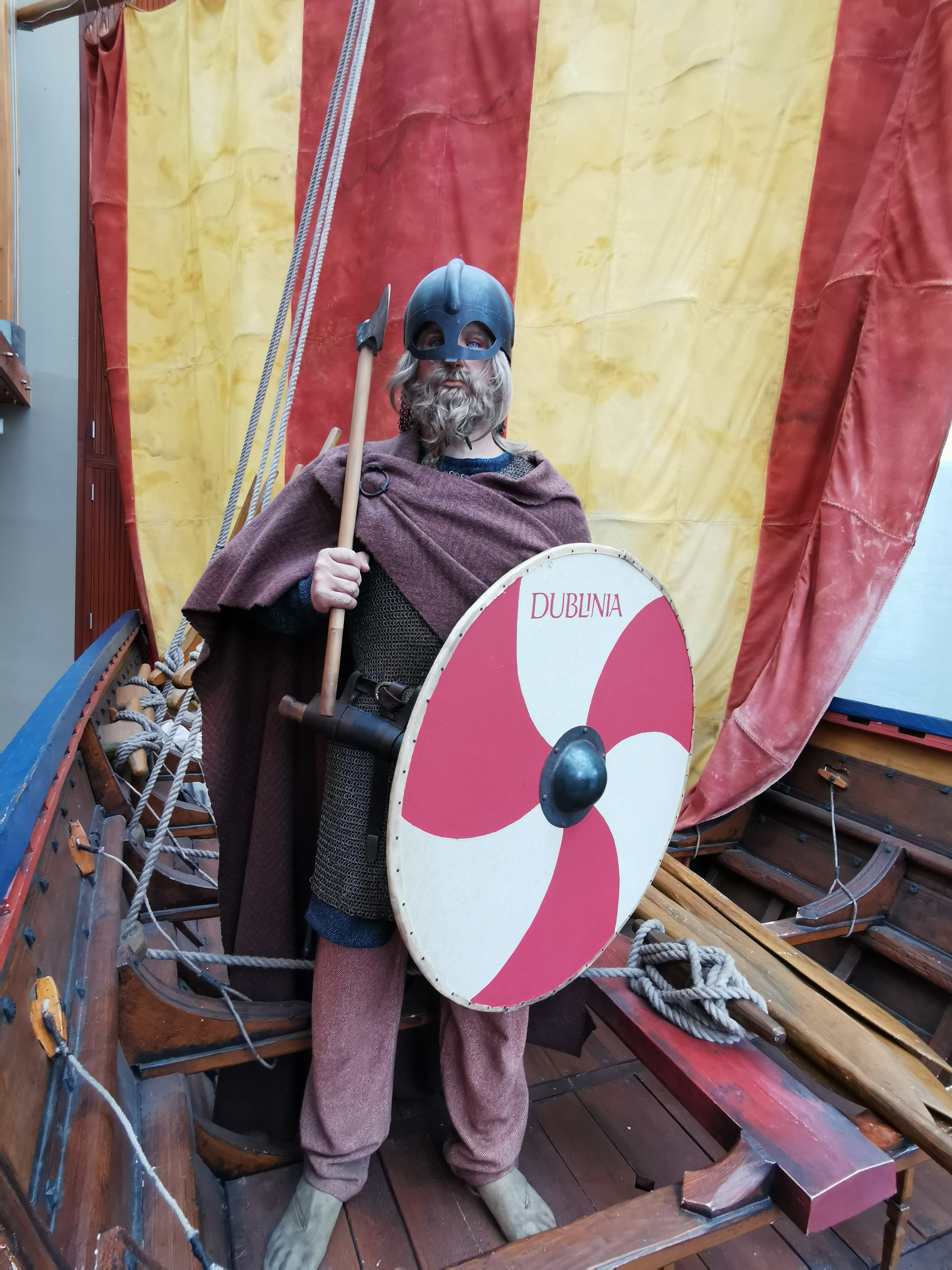
A statue of a Viking on a longship in Dublin

The Viking settlement of about 841 was preceded by a Christian ecclesiastical settlement known as Duibhlinn, from which Dyflin took its name. Evidence indicating that Anglo-Saxons occupied Dublin before the Vikings arrived in 841 has been found in an archaeological dig in Temple Bar.

The Irish government recognised 988 as the year in which the city was settled and that this first settlement would later become the city of Dublin; Dublin celebrated its 'official' millennium in 1988.

Beginning in the 9th and 10th centuries, two settlements later became modern Dublin. The subsequent Scandinavian settlement centred on the River Poddle, a tributary of the Liffey in an area now known as Wood Quay. The Dubhlinn was a pool on the lowest stretch of the Poddle, where ships used to moor. This pool was finally fully infilled during the early 18th century, as the city grew. The Dubhlinn lay where the Castle Garden is now located, opposite the Chester Beatty Library within Dublin Castle. Táin Bó Cuailgne ("The Cattle Raid of Cooley") refers to Dublind rissa ratter Áth Cliath, meaning "Dublin, which is called Ath Cliath".

=== Middle Ages ===
In 841, the Vikings established a fortified base in Dublin. The town grew into a substantial commercial centre under Olaf Guthfrithson in the mid-to-late 10th century and, despite some attacks by the native Irish, it remained largely under Viking control until the Norman invasion of Ireland was launched from Wales in 1169. The hinterland of Dublin in the Norse period was named in Old Norse: Dyflinnar skíði, lit. 'Dublinshire'. It was upon the death of Muirchertach Mac Lochlainn in early 1166 that Ruaidrí Ua Conchobair, King of Connacht, proceeded to Dublin and was inaugurated King of Ireland without opposition.

According to some historians, part of the city's early economic growth was driven by the slave trade. Slavery in Ireland and Dublin reached its pinnacle in the 9th and 10th centuries. Prisoners from slave raids and kidnappings, which captured men, women and children, brought revenue to the Gaelic Irish Sea raiders, and to the Vikings who had initiated the practice. The victims came from Wales, England, Normandy and beyond.

The King of Leinster, Diarmait Mac Murchada, after his exile by Ruaidhrí, enlisted the help of Strongbow, the Earl of Pembroke, to conquer Dublin. Following Mac Murchada's death, Strongbow declared himself King of Leinster after gaining control of the city. In response to Strongbow's successful invasion, Henry II of England affirmed his ultimate sovereignty by mounting a larger invasion in 1171 and pronounced himself Lord of Ireland. Around this time, the county of the City of Dublin was established along with certain liberties adjacent to the city proper. This continued down to 1840 when the barony of Dublin City was separated from the barony of Dublin. Since 2001, both baronies have been redesignated as the City of Dublin.

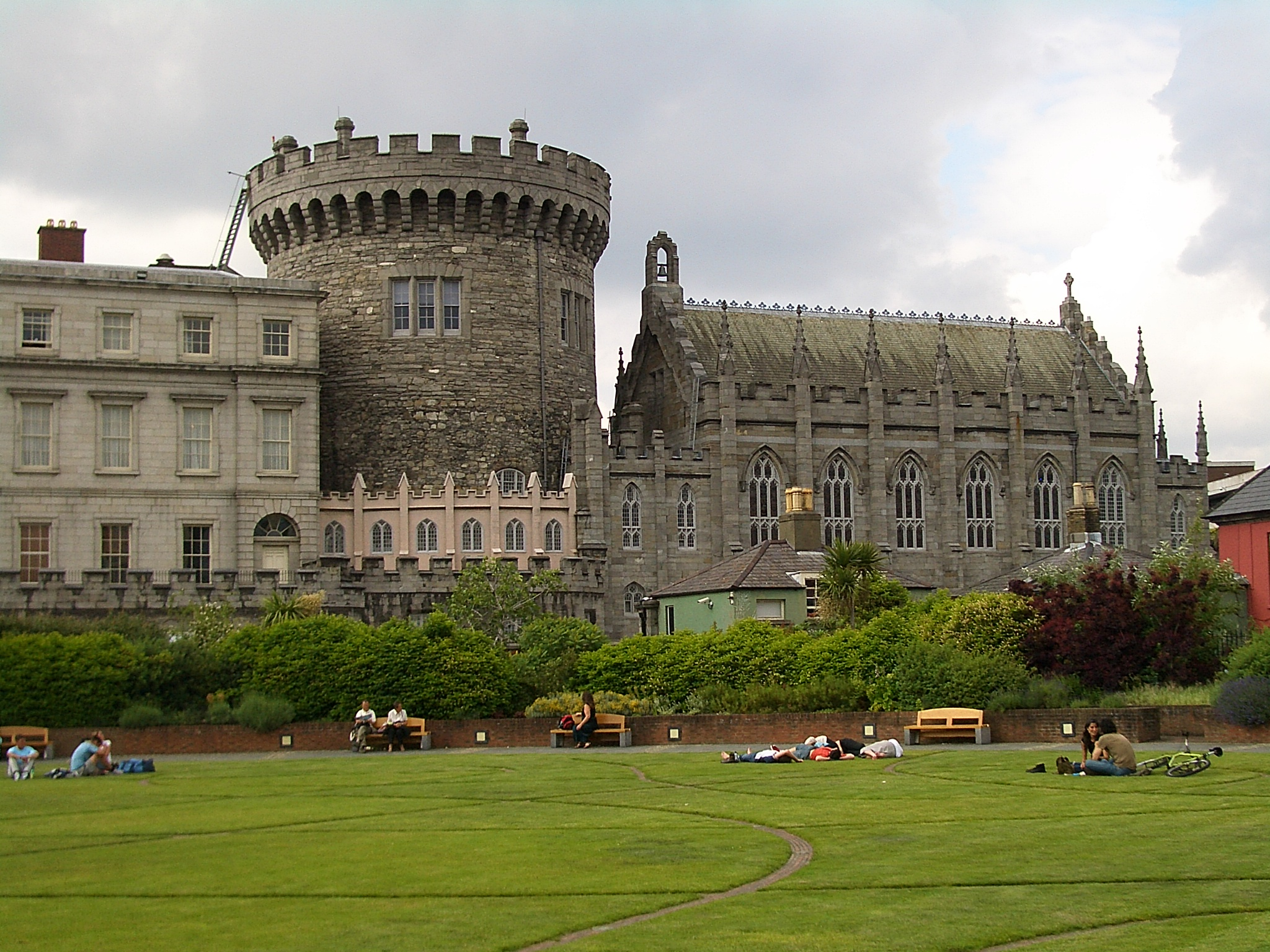
Dublin Castle, with its 13th-century tower, was the fortified seat of British rule in Ireland until 1922.

Dublin Castle, which became the centre of Anglo-Norman power in Ireland, was founded in 1204 as a major defensive work on the orders of King John of England. Following the appointment of the first Lord Mayor of Dublin in 1229, the city expanded and had a population of 8,000 by the end of the 13th century. Dublin prospered as a trade centre, despite an attempt by King Robert the Bruce of Scotland to capture the city in 1317. It remained a relatively small walled medieval town during the 14th century and was under constant threat from the surrounding native clans. In 1348, the Black Death, a lethal plague which had ravaged Europe, took hold in Dublin and killed thousands over the following decade.

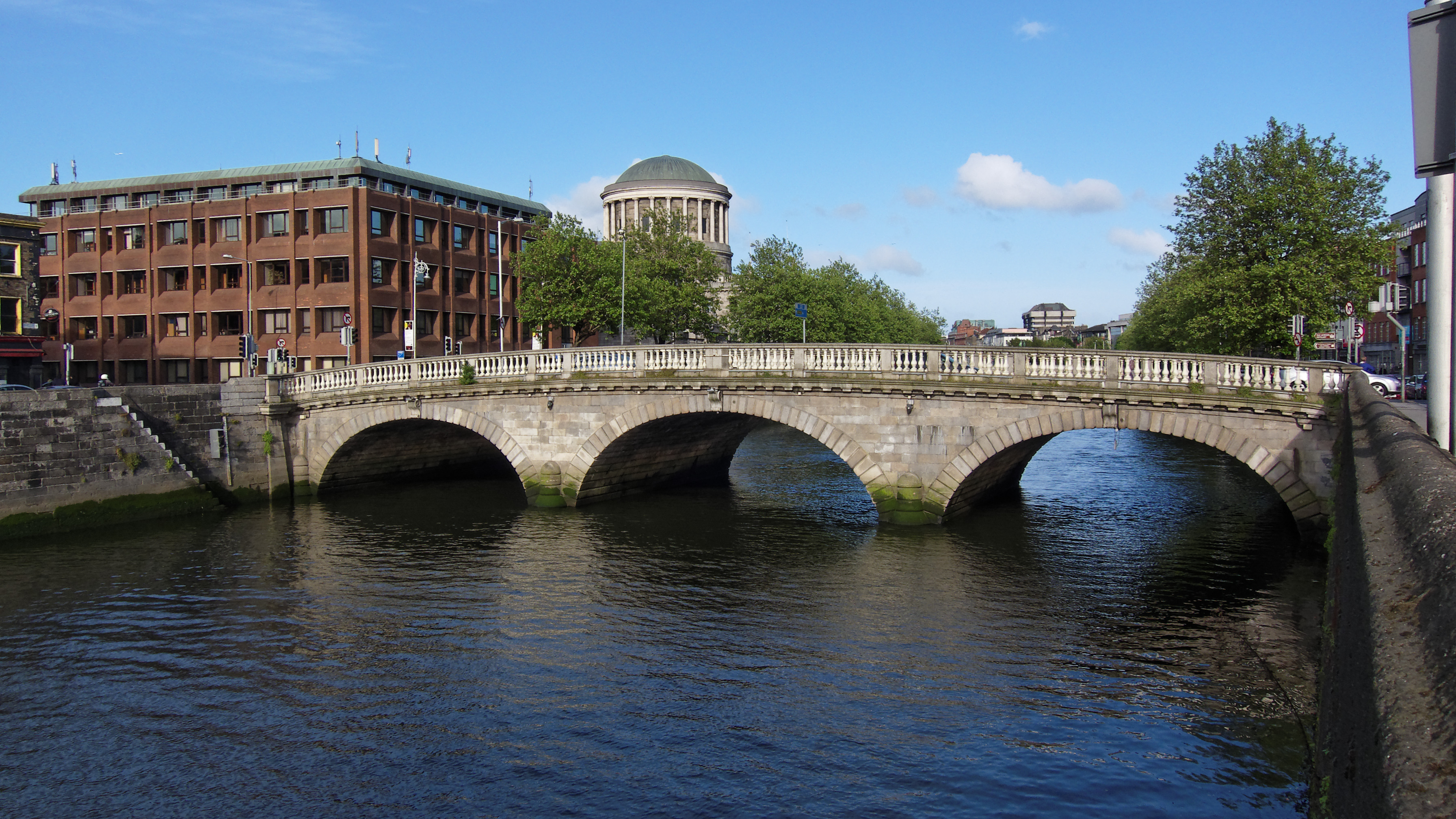
Father Mathew Bridge, also known as Dublin Bridge

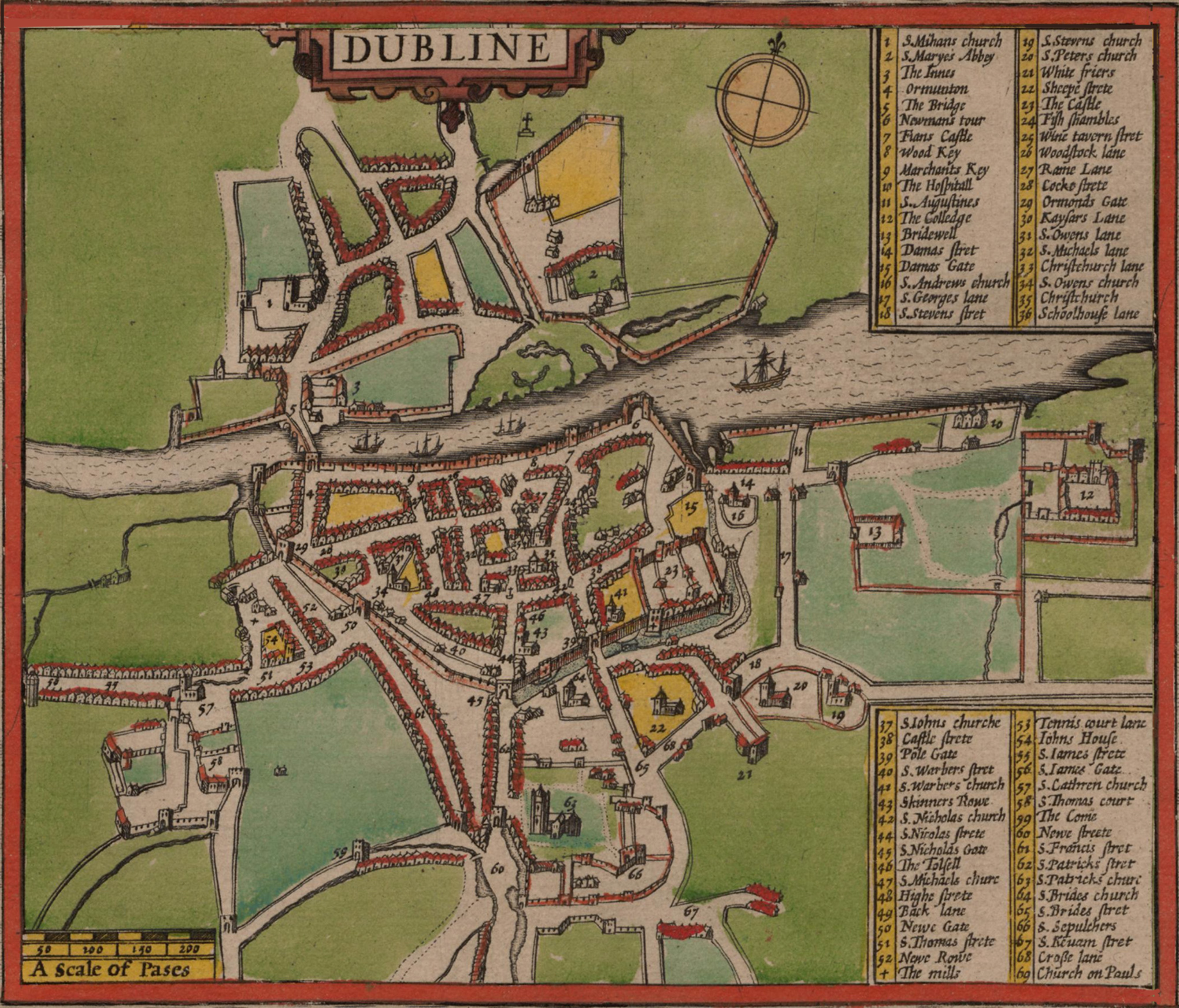
Dubline, 1610; a contemporary map by John Speed (1896 reprint)

Dublin was the heart of the area known as the Pale, a narrow strip of English settlement along the eastern coast, under the control of the English Crown. The Tudor conquest of Ireland in the 16th century marked a new era for Dublin, with the city enjoying a renewed prominence as the centre of administrative rule in Ireland, where English control and settlement had become much more extensive. Determined to make Dublin a Protestant city, Queen Elizabeth I established Trinity College in 1592 as a solely Protestant university and ordered that the Catholic St. Patrick's and Christ Church cathedrals be converted to the Protestant church. The earliest map of the city of Dublin is John Speed's Map of Dublin (1610).

The city had a population of 21,000 in 1640 before a plague from 1649 to 1651 wiped out almost half of the inhabitants. However, the city prospered again soon after, thanks to the wool and linen trade with England, and reached a population of over 50,000 by 1700. By 1698 the manufacture of wool employed 12,000 people.

=== Early modern ===
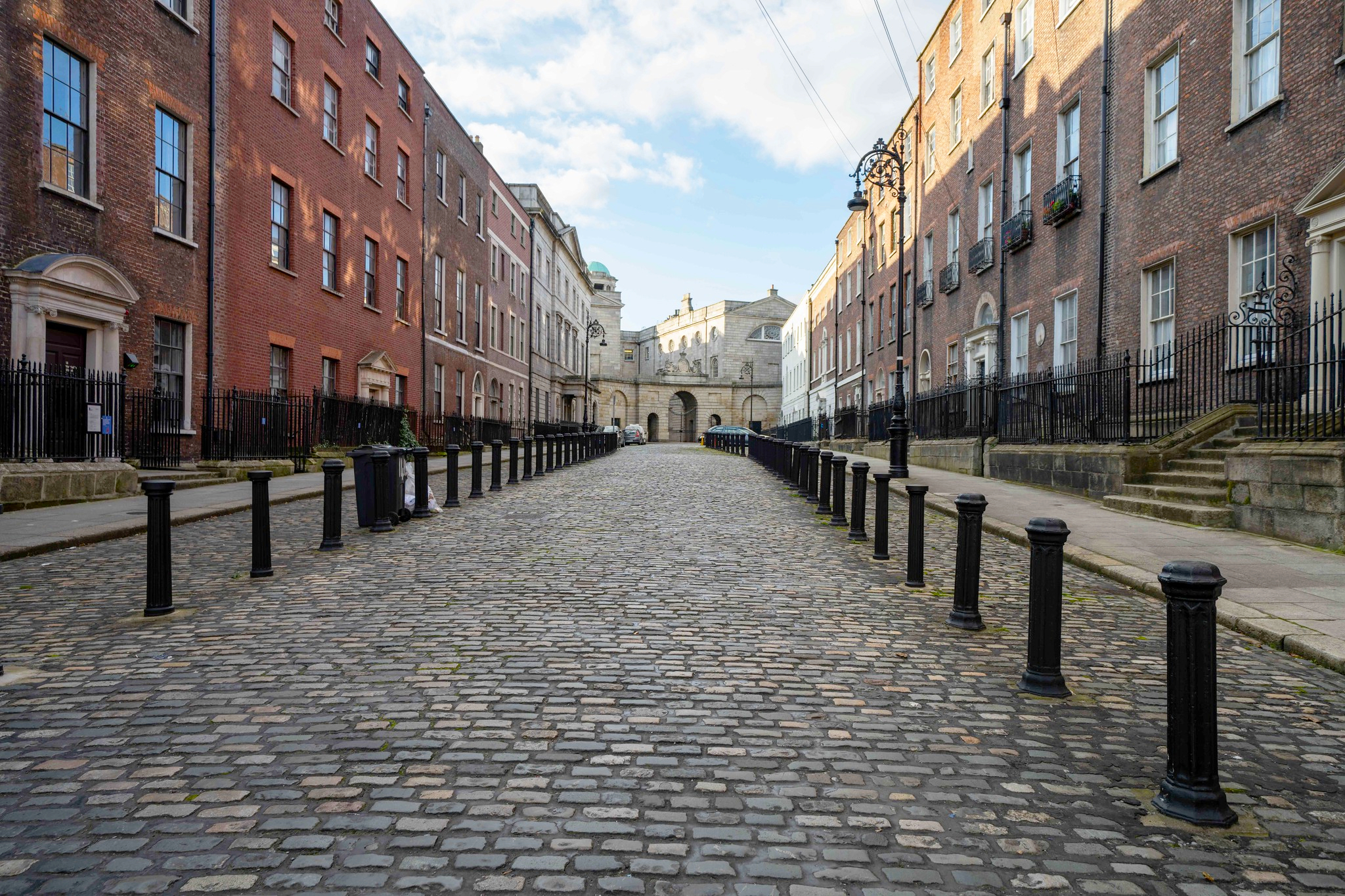
Henrietta Street, developed in the 1720s, is the earliest Georgian street in Dublin.

As the city continued to prosper during the 18th century, Georgian Dublin became, for a short period, the second-largest city of the British Empire and the fifth-largest city in Europe, with a population exceeding 130,000. In comparison, some medieval streets and layouts (including the areas around Temple Bar, Aungier Street, Capel Street, and Thomas Street) were less affected by the wave of Georgian reconstruction, and much of Dublin's architecture and layout dates from this period.

Dublin grew even more dramatically during the 18th century, with the construction of many new districts and buildings, such as Merrion Square, Parliament House, and the Royal Exchange. The Wide Streets Commission was established in 1757 at the request of Dublin Corporation to govern architectural standards on the layout of streets, bridges, and buildings. In 1759, the Guinness brewery was founded, and would eventually grow to become the largest brewery in the world and the largest employer in Dublin. During the 1700s, linen was not subject to the same trade restrictions with England as wool, and became the most important Irish export. Over 1.5 million yards of linen were exported from Ireland in 1710, rising to almost 19 million yards by 1779.

=== Late modern and contemporary ===
The island of Ireland, showing location of Dublin city

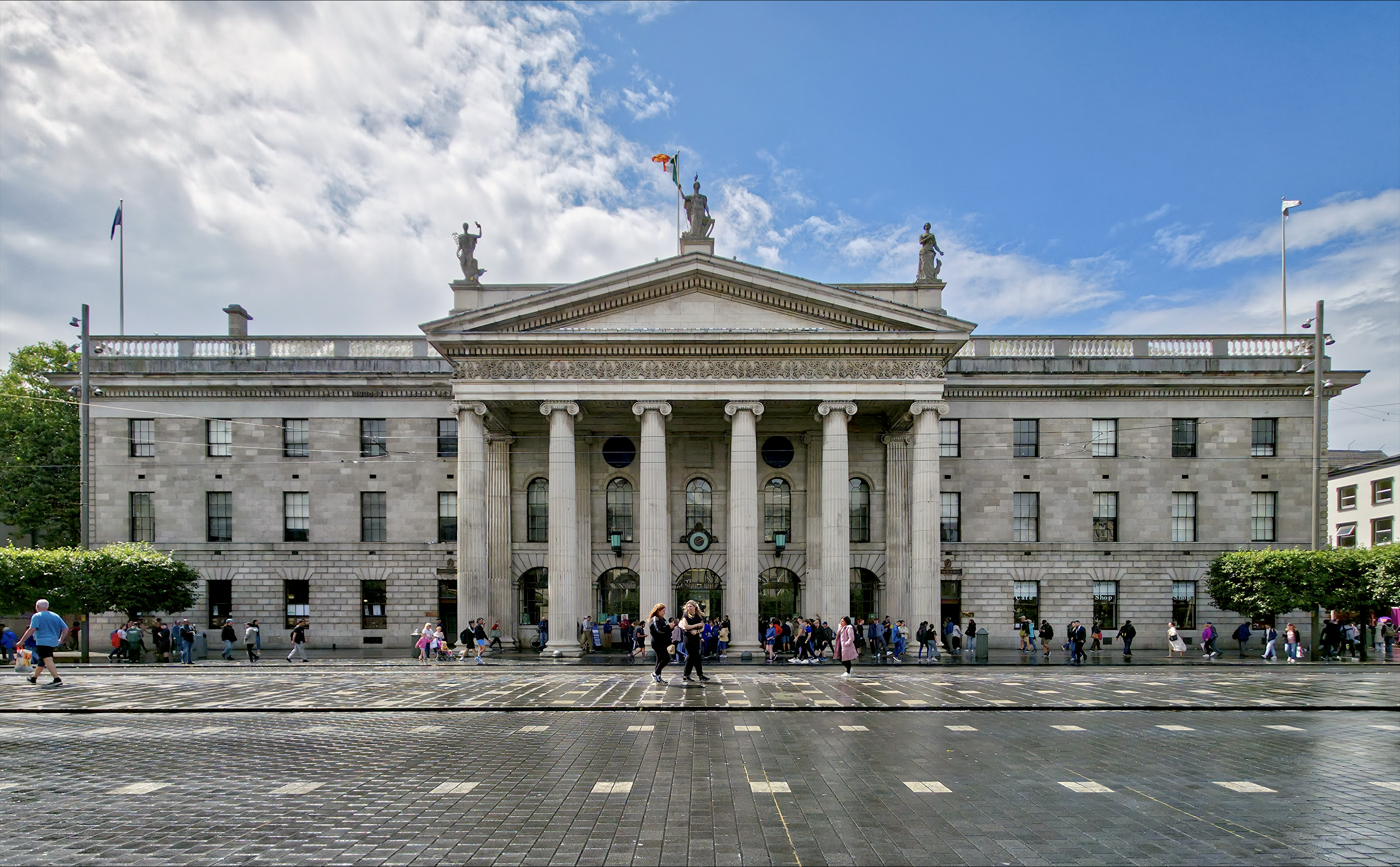
The GPO on O'Connell Street was at the centre of the 1916 Easter Rising.

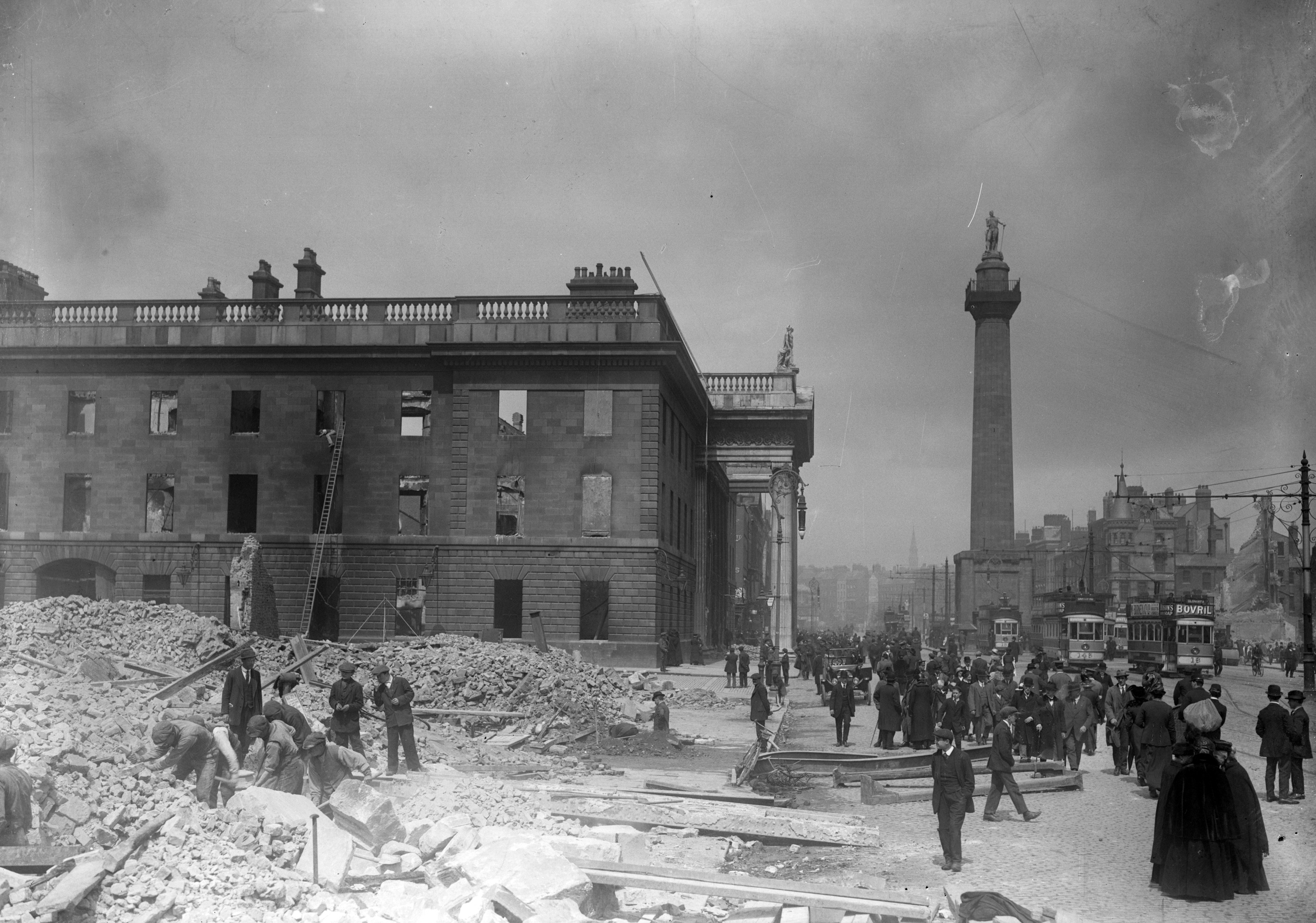
Damage in Dublin city centre following the 1916 Easter Rising with the ruins of the GPO to the left

Dublin suffered a period of political and economic decline during the 19th century following the Acts of Union 1800, under which the seat of government was transferred to the Westminster Parliament in London. The city played no major role in the Industrial Revolution, but remained the centre of administration and a transport hub for most of the island. Ireland had no significant coal reserves, the fuel of the time, and Dublin was not a centre of shipbuilding, the other main driver of industrial development in Britain and Ireland. Belfast developed faster than Dublin during this period on a mixture of international trade, factory-based linen cloth production and shipbuilding. By 1814, the population of Dublin was 175,319 as counted under the Population Act, making the population of Dublin higher than any town in England except London. The population had reached 233,159 inhabitants by the time of the 1841 census.

The Easter Rising of 1916, the Irish War of Independence, and the subsequent Irish Civil War resulted in significant physical destruction in central Dublin. The Government of the Irish Free State rebuilt the city centre and located the new parliament, the Oireachtas, in Leinster House. Since the beginning of Norman rule in the 12th century, the city has functioned as the capital in varying geopolitical entities: Lordship of Ireland (1171–1541), Kingdom of Ireland (1541–1800), as part of the United Kingdom of Great Britain and Ireland (1801–1922), and the Irish Republic (1919–1922). Following the partition of Ireland in 1922, it became the capital of the Irish Free State (1922–1937) and is now the capital of Ireland. One of the memorials to commemorate that time is the Garden of Remembrance.

Dublin was also a victim of the Northern Irish Troubles, although during this 30-year conflict, violence mainly occurred within Northern Ireland. A Loyalist paramilitary group, the Ulster Volunteer Force, bombed the city during this time – notably in an atrocity known as the Dublin and Monaghan bombings in which 34 people died, mainly in central Dublin.

Large parts of Georgian Dublin were demolished or substantially redeveloped in the mid-20th century during a boom in office buildings. After this boom, the recessions of the 1970s and 1980s slowed construction. Cumulatively, this led to a significant decline in the number of people living in the centre of the city, and by 1985 the town had approximately 150 acres of derelict land which had been earmarked for development and 10 million square feet (900 thousand square metres) of office space.

Since 1997, Dublin's landscape has changed. The city was at the forefront of Ireland's economic expansion during the Celtic Tiger period, with private-sector and state-led development of housing, transport, and business. Following an economic decline during the Great Recession, Dublin has rebounded and as of 2017 has close to full employment, but has a significant problem with housing supply in both the city and surrounds.

== Government ==
=== Local ===
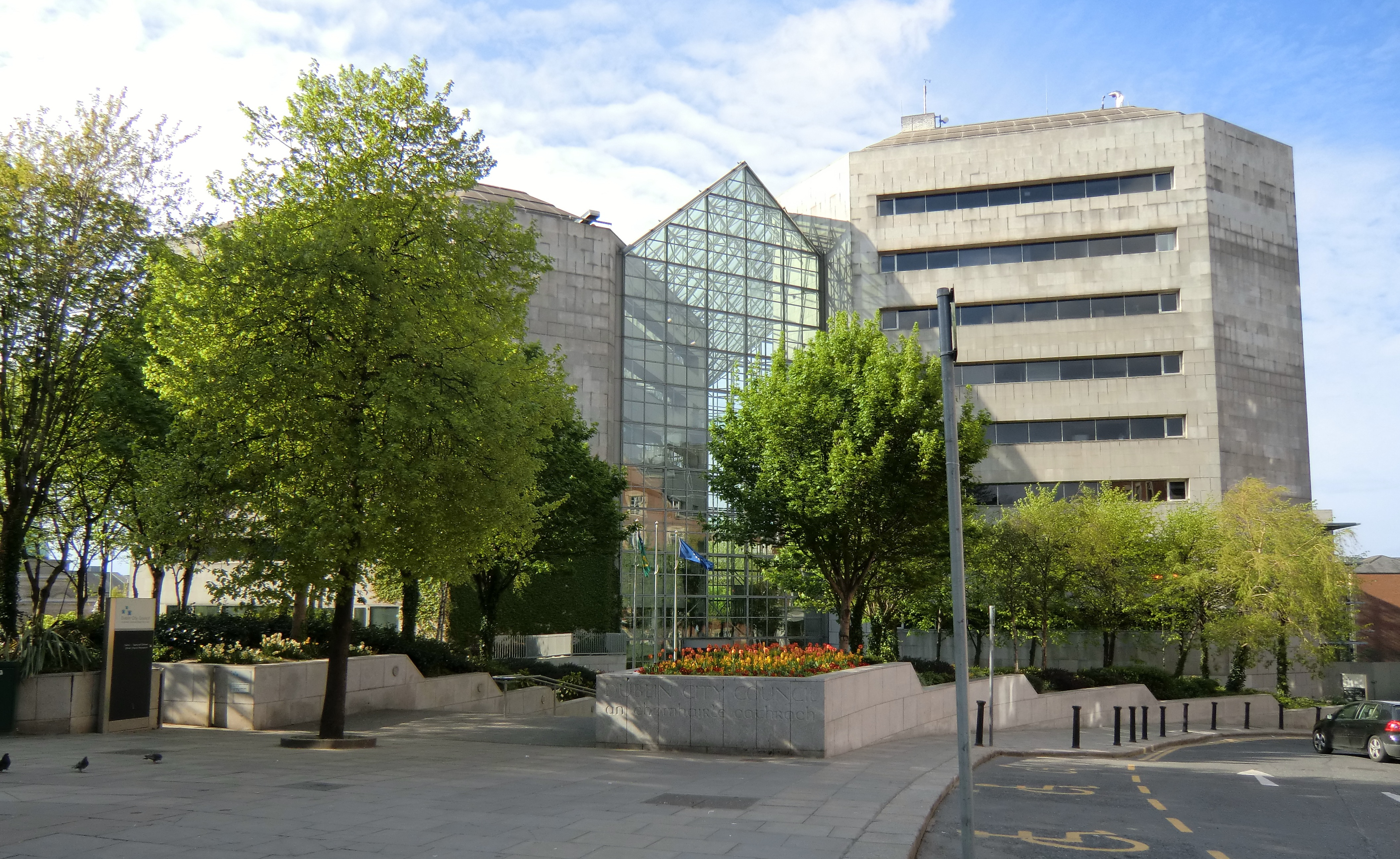
Civic Offices of Dublin City Council

Dublin City Council is a unicameral assembly of 63 members elected every five years from local electoral areas. It is presided over by the Lord Mayor, who is elected for a yearly term and resides in Dublin's Mansion House. Council meetings occur at Dublin City Hall, while most of its administrative activities are based in the Civic Offices on Wood Quay. The party or coalition of parties with the majority of seats assigns committee members, introduces policies, and proposes the Lord Mayor. The Council passes an annual budget for spending on areas such as housing, traffic management, refuse, drainage, and planning. The Dublin City Manager is responsible for implementing City Council decisions, but also has considerable executive power. Neighbouring local authorities in County Dublin are South Dublin County Council, Fingal County Council, and Dun Laoghaire-Rathdown County Council, and parts of the wider city and its suburbs lie in the functional areas of all three.

=== National ===
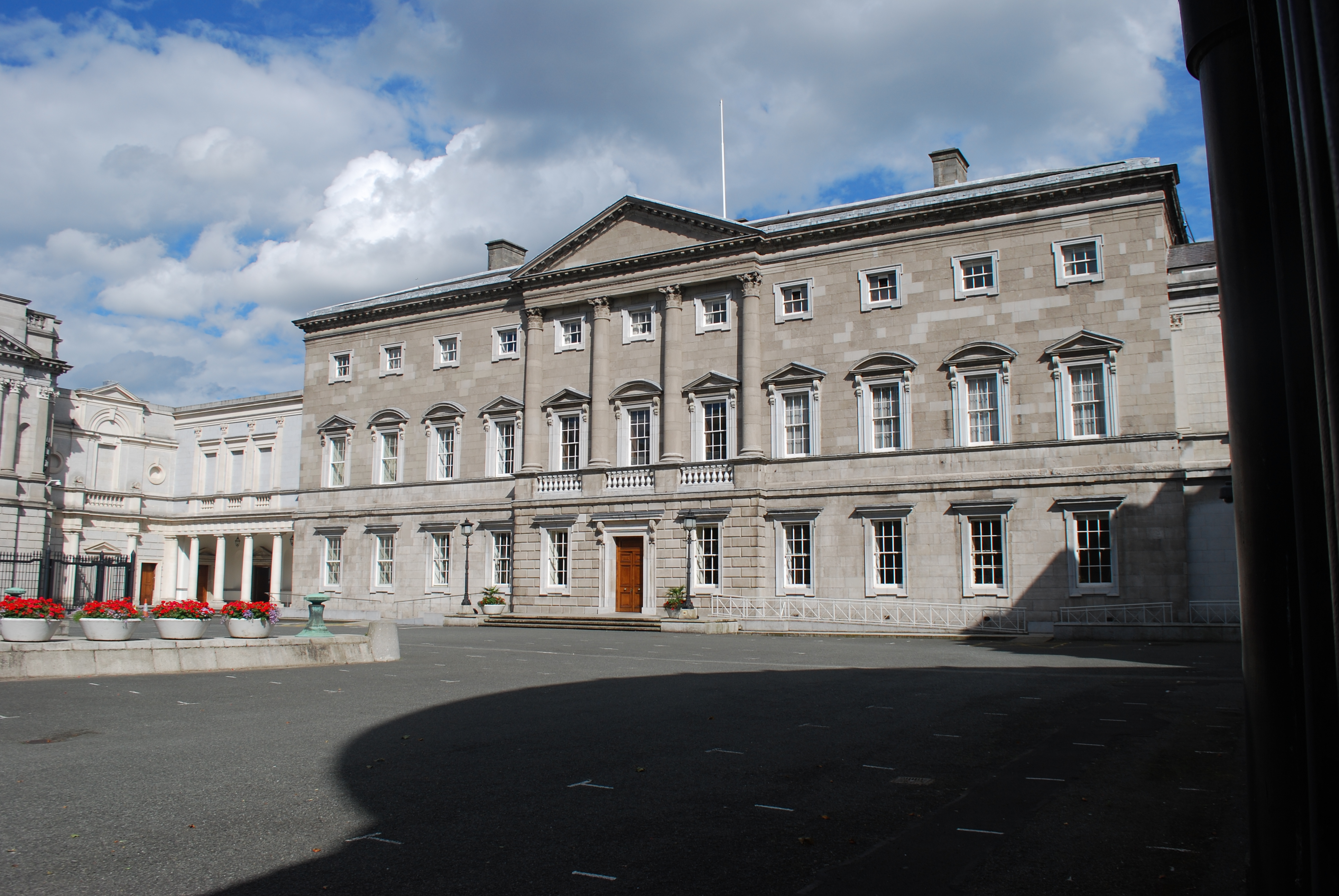
Leinster House on Kildare Street houses the Oireachtas.

As the capital city, Dublin is the seat of the Irish parliament, the Oireachtas. It is composed of the President of Ireland, Dáil Éireann as the house of representatives, and Seanad Éireann as the upper house. The President resides in Áras an Uachtaráin in Phoenix Park, while both houses of the Oireachtas meet in Leinster House, a former ducal residence on Kildare Street. It has been the home of the Irish parliament since the foundation of the Irish Free State in 1922. The old Irish Houses of Parliament of the Kingdom of Ireland, which dissolved in 1801, are located in College Green.

Government Buildings house the Department of the Taoiseach, the Council Chamber, the Department of Finance, and the Office of the Attorney General. It consists of a main building (completed 1911) with two wings (completed 1921). It was designed by Thomas Manley Dean and Sir Aston Webb as the Royal College of Science. The First Dáil originally met in the Mansion House in 1919. The Irish Free State government took over the two wings of the building to serve as a temporary home for some ministries. In contrast, the central building became the College of Technology until 1989. Although both it and Leinster House were intended to be temporary locations, they became the permanent homes of parliament from then on.

For elections to Dáil Éireann, five constituencies are wholly or predominantly in the Dublin City area: Dublin Central (4 seats), Dublin Bay North (5 seats), Dublin North-West (3 seats), Dublin South-Central (4 seats) and Dublin Bay South (4 seats). Twenty TDs are elected in total. The constituency of Dublin West (4 seats) is partially in Dublin City, but predominantly in Fingal.

At the 2024 general election, the Dublin city area elected 5 Sinn Féin, 4 Fianna Fáil, 4 Social Democrats, 3 Fine Gael, 2 Labour and 2 Independents.

== Geography ==
=== Landscape ===
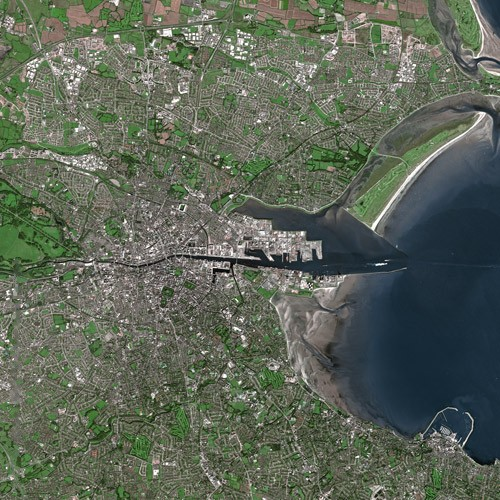
Satellite image showing the River Liffey entering the Irish Sea as it divides Dublin into the Northside and the Southside

Dublin is situated at the mouth of the River Liffey and its urban area encompasses approximately 345 square kilometres (133 sq mi) in east-central Ireland. It is bordered by the Dublin Mountains, a low mountain range and sub-range of the Wicklow Mountains, to the south, and surrounded by flat farmland to the north and west.

==== Watercourses ====
The River Liffey divides the city into two, between the Northside and the Southside. The Liffey bends at Leixlip from a northeasterly route to a predominantly eastward direction. This point also marks the transition from more agricultural land to urban development. The city itself was founded where the River Poddle met the Liffey. The early Viking settlement was also facilitated by the small Steine or Steyne River, the larger Camac and the Bradogue, in particular.

Two secondary rivers further divide the city: the River Tolka, running southeast into Dublin Bay, and the River Dodder, running northeast to near the mouth of the Liffey. These, along with the Liffey, have multiple tributaries. Many lesser rivers and streams also flow to the sea within the suburban parts of the city.

Two canals – the Grand Canal on the southside and the Royal Canal on the northside – ring the inner city on their way from the west, both connecting with the River Shannon.

=== Climate ===
Similar to much of the rest of northwestern Europe, Dublin has a maritime climate (Cfb) with mild-warm summers, cool winters, and little temperature extremes. At Merrion Square, the coldest month is February, with an average minimum temperature of 4.1 °C (39.4 °F). The warmest month is July, with an average maximum temperature of 20.1 °C (68.2 °F). Due to the urban heat island effect, Dublin city has the warmest summertime nights in Ireland. The average minimum temperature at Merrion Square in July is 13.5 °C (56.3 °F). The lowest July temperature ever recorded at the station was 7.8 °C (46.0 °F) on 3 July 1974.

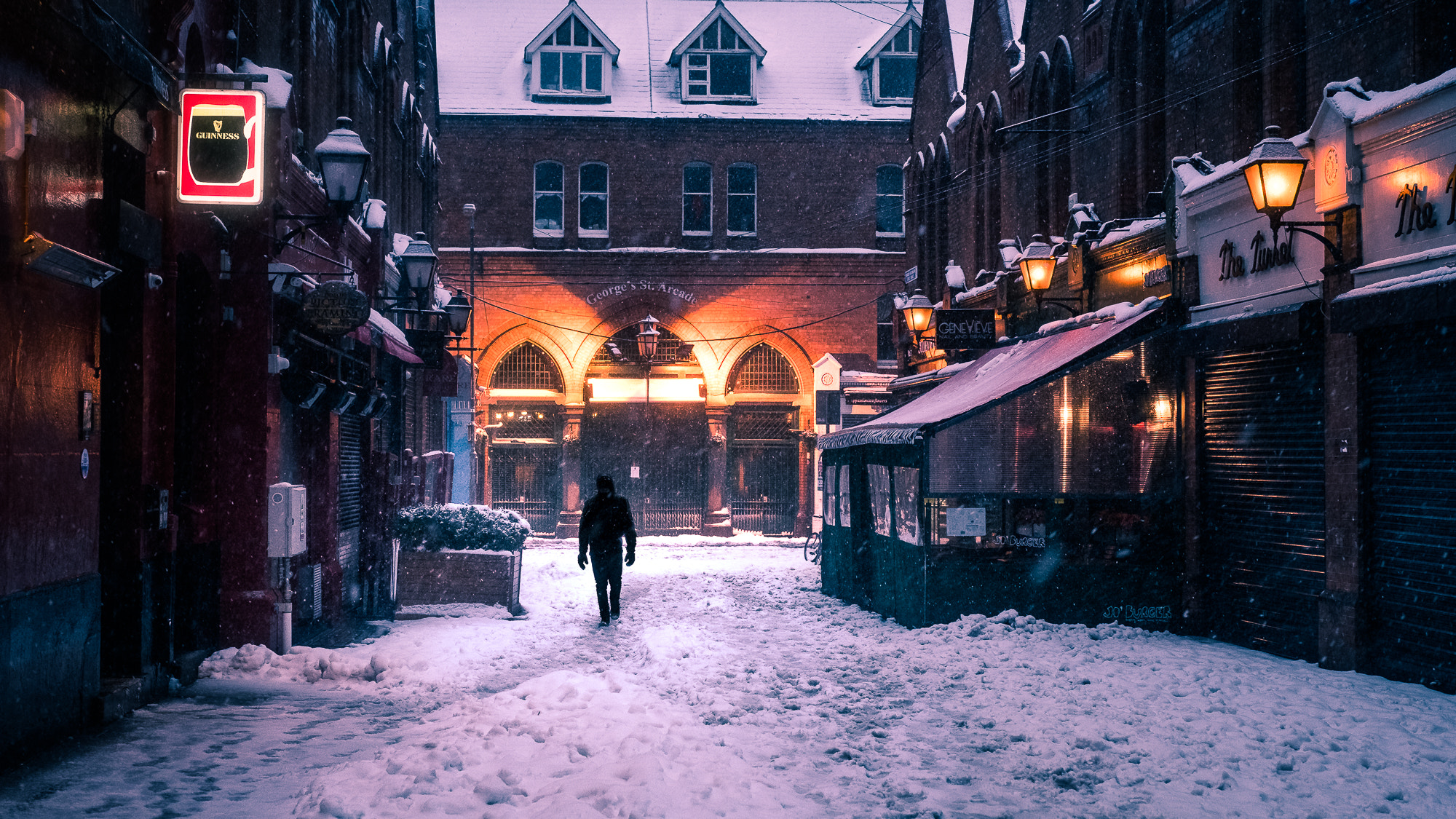
Winter in Dublin

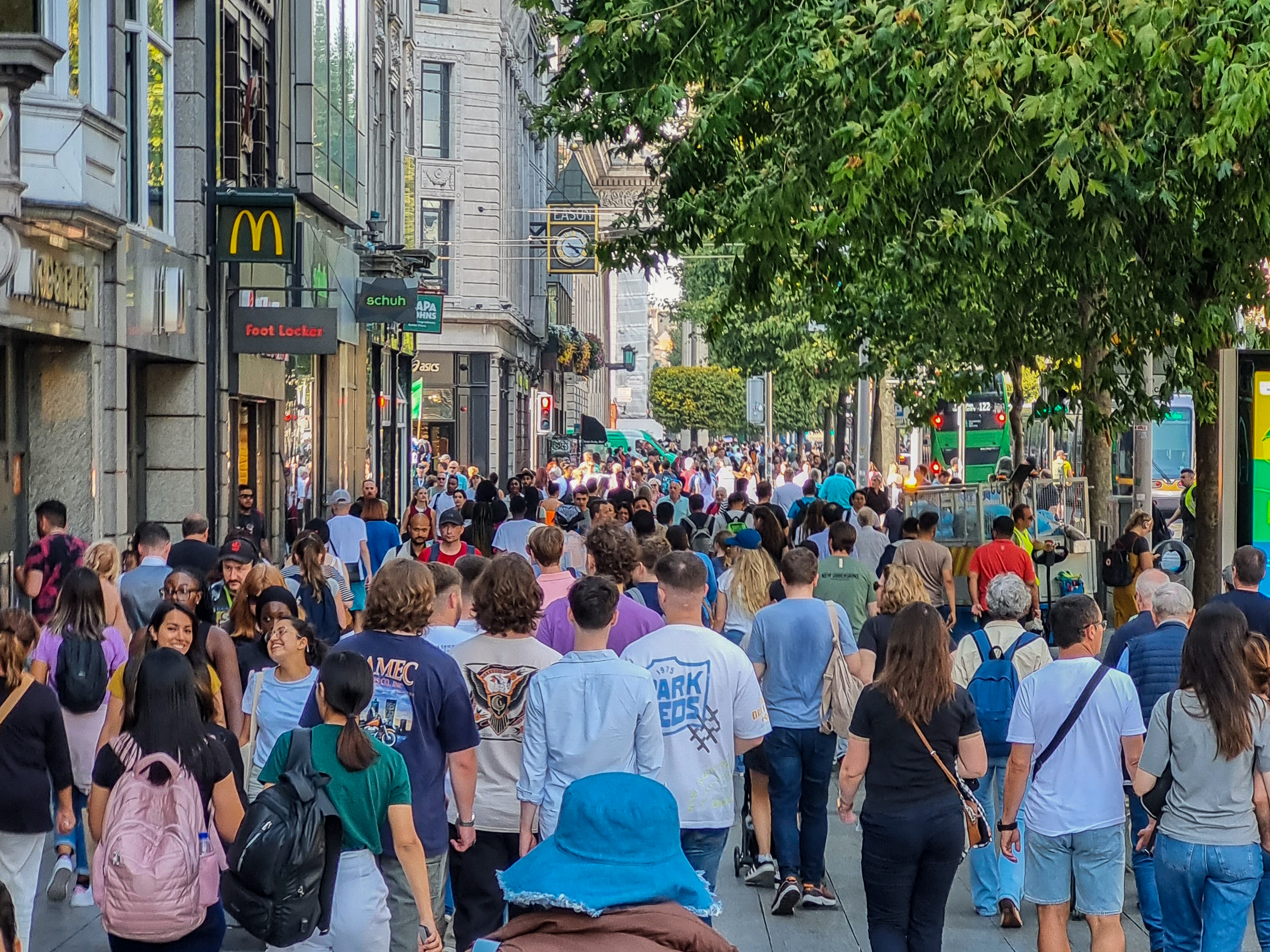
The city during summer

The highest temperature officially recorded in Dublin is 33.1 °C (91.6 °F) on 18 July 2022, at the Phoenix Park. A non-official record of 33.5 °C (92.3 °F) was recorded at Phoenix Park in July 1876.

Dublin's sheltered location on the east coast makes it the driest place in Ireland, receiving only about half the rainfall of the west coast. Ringsend in the south of the city records the lowest rainfall in the country, with an average annual precipitation of 683 mm (27 in). The average annual precipitation in the city centre is 726 mm (29 in). At Merrion Square, the wettest year and driest year on record occurred within 5 years of each other. 1953 receiving just 463.1 mm (18.23 in) of rainfall, while 1958 recorded 1,022.5 mm (40.26 in). The main precipitation in winter is rain. Snow showers occur between November and March. Hail is more common than snow. Strong Atlantic winds are most common in autumn. These winds can affect Dublin, but because of its easterly location, it is the least affected part of the country. In winter, easterly winds render the city colder and more prone to snow showers.

Dublin has long summer days and short winter days. Based on satellite observations, Met Éireann estimates that Dublin's coastal areas typically receive over 1,600 hours of sunshine per year, with the climate getting progressively duller inland. Dublin Airport, located north of the city and about 10 kilometres (6.2 mi) from the coast, records an average of 1,470 hours of sunshine per year. Casement Aerodrome, located west of the city and about 16 kilometres (9.9 mi) from the coast, records an average of 1,397 hours of sunshine per year. The station at Dublin Airport has been maintaining climate records since November 1941. The sunniest year on record was 1,740 hours in 1959. The dullest year was 1987 with 1,240 hours of sunshine. The lowest monthly total of sunshine on record was 16.4 hours in January 1996. The highest was 305.9 hours in July 1955.

In the 20th century, smog and air-pollution were an issue in the city, precipitating a ban on bituminous fuels across Dublin. The ban was implemented in 1990 to address black smoke concentrations, that had been linked to cardiovascular and respiratory deaths in residents. Since the ban, non-trauma death rates, respiratory death rates, and cardiovascular death rates have declined by an estimated 350 deaths annually.

Climate data for Dublin Airport (DUB), (Note: Weather station is located 8.2 kilometres (5.1 mi) from the Dublin city centre.) 1991–2020 normals, extremes 1939-present
Month	Jan	Feb	Mar	Apr	May	Jun	Jul	Aug	Sep	Oct	Nov	Dec	Year
Record high °C (°F)	16.6 (61.9)	16.2 (61.2)	21.3 (70.3)	21.7 (71.1)	24.1 (75.4)	27.6 (81.7)	29.1 (84.4)	28.7 (83.7)	26.1 (79.0)	21.2 (70.2)	18.0 (64.4)	17.1 (62.8)	29.1 (84.4)
Mean daily maximum °C (°F)	8.0 (46.4)	8.5 (47.3)	10.1 (50.2)	12.3 (54.1)	14.8 (58.6)	17.7 (63.9)	19.5 (67.1)	19.1 (66.4)	16.9 (62.4)	13.6 (56.5)	10.3 (50.5)	8.3 (46.9)	13.3 (55.9)
Daily mean °C (°F)	5.2 (41.4)	5.3 (41.5)	6.6 (43.9)	8.2 (46.8)	10.7 (51.3)	13.3 (55.9)	15.4 (59.7)	15.1 (59.2)	13.2 (55.8)	10.4 (50.7)	7.3 (45.1)	5.5 (41.9)	9.7 (49.5)
Mean daily minimum °C (°F)	2.3 (36.1)	2.2 (36.0)	3.0 (37.4)	4.0 (39.2)	6.6 (43.9)	9.0 (48.2)	11.3 (52.3)	11.2 (52.2)	9.5 (49.1)	7.1 (44.8)	4.3 (39.7)	2.6 (36.7)	6.1 (43.0)
Record low °C (°F)	−10.7 (12.7)	−10.9 (12.4)	−7.9 (17.8)	−5.6 (21.9)	−3.0 (26.6)	1.4 (34.5)	3.9 (39.0)	2.4 (36.3)	−0.2 (31.6)	−4.3 (24.3)	−8.4 (16.9)	−12.2 (10.0)	−12.2 (10.0)
Average precipitation mm (inches)	61.8 (2.43)	52.4 (2.06)	51.4 (2.02)	55.0 (2.17)	57.0 (2.24)	64.0 (2.52)	61.0 (2.40)	73.4 (2.89)	63.3 (2.49)	78.4 (3.09)	82.7 (3.26)	72.1 (2.84)	772.5 (30.41)
Average precipitation days (≥ 1.0 mm)	12.5	11.0	10.7	11.1	10.5	9.8	11.6	11.8	10.7	11.6	12.5	13.3	137.1
Average snowy days	3.2	3.2	2.4	0.7	0.1	0.0	0.0	0.0	0.0	0.0	0.6	2.3	12.5
Average relative humidity (%)	85.6	84.0	81.8	80.0	78.7	78.5	80.0	81.2	83.0	84.3	86.8	87.1	82.6
Average dew point °C (°F)	3.2 (37.8)	3.0 (37.4)	3.6 (38.5)	4.8 (40.6)	7.1 (44.8)	9.7 (49.5)	11.6 (52.9)	11.6 (52.9)	10.2 (50.4)	7.8 (46.0)	5.5 (41.9)	3.8 (38.8)	6.8 (44.2)
Mean monthly sunshine hours	59.1	81.4	115.1	161.4	199.2	179.2	156.5	155.8	130.5	105.3	73.1	53.9	1,470.5
Source 1: Met Éireann
Source 2: NOAA Servizio Meteorologico (extremes)

Climate data for Casement Aerodrome (Note: Weather station is located 13.2 kilometres (8.2 mi) from the Dublin city centre.) (1991-2020 normals, extremes 1958-present)
Month	Jan	Feb	Mar	Apr	May	Jun	Jul	Aug	Sep	Oct	Nov	Dec	Year
Record high °C (°F)	15.4 (59.7)	17.2 (63.0)	21.0 (69.8)	24.1 (75.4)	25.4 (77.7)	29.4 (84.9)	31.9 (89.4)	31.2 (88.2)	27.3 (81.1)	23.4 (74.1)	17.7 (63.9)	15.4 (59.7)	31.9 (89.4)
Mean daily maximum °C (°F)	8.0 (46.4)	8.5 (47.3)	10.3 (50.5)	12.4 (54.3)	15.4 (59.7)	18.0 (64.4)	19.8 (67.6)	19.4 (66.9)	17.0 (62.6)	13.7 (56.7)	10.3 (50.5)	8.3 (46.9)	13.4 (56.1)
Daily mean °C (°F)	5.2 (41.4)	5.3 (41.5)	6.7 (44.1)	8.5 (47.3)	11.2 (52.2)	13.8 (56.8)	15.7 (60.3)	15.4 (59.7)	13.3 (55.9)	10.4 (50.7)	7.4 (45.3)	5.4 (41.7)	9.9 (49.8)
Mean daily minimum °C (°F)	2.4 (36.3)	2.2 (36.0)	3.1 (37.6)	4.5 (40.1)	6.9 (44.4)	9.6 (49.3)	11.6 (52.9)	11.4 (52.5)	9.6 (49.3)	7.2 (45.0)	4.4 (39.9)	2.6 (36.7)	6.3 (43.3)
Record low °C (°F)	−13.2 (8.2)	−10.3 (13.5)	−9.8 (14.4)	−5.9 (21.4)	−3.6 (25.5)	−0.7 (30.7)	2.5 (36.5)	1.5 (34.7)	−0.3 (31.5)	−4.1 (24.6)	−9.1 (15.6)	−15.7 (3.7)	−15.7 (3.7)
Average precipitation mm (inches)	65.0 (2.56)	55.2 (2.17)	51.8 (2.04)	55.3 (2.18)	59.1 (2.33)	65.7 (2.59)	59.4 (2.34)	71.2 (2.80)	61.6 (2.43)	81.6 (3.21)	81.9 (3.22)	75.7 (2.98)	783.5 (30.85)
Average precipitation days (≥ 1.0 mm)	12.3	11.4	10.2	10.9	10.5	10.1	11.9	11.5	10.0	12.0	12.4	13.2	136.4
Average snowy days	3.2	3.1	2.2	0.7	0.1	0.0	0.0	0.0	0.0	0.0	0.6	2.0	11.9
Average relative humidity (%)	86.1	84.5	82.0	79.4	78.2	78.6	80.5	81.7	83.3	84.9	87.2	87.3	82.8
Average dew point °C (°F)	3.3 (37.9)	3.0 (37.4)	3.7 (38.7)	4.9 (40.8)	7.2 (45.0)	9.9 (49.8)	11.9 (53.4)	11.9 (53.4)	10.3 (50.5)	7.9 (46.2)	5.5 (41.9)	3.8 (38.8)	6.9 (44.4)
Mean monthly sunshine hours	53.5	74.5	106.8	156.9	190.2	167.4	152.9	153.4	125.3	101.8	66.9	47.6	1,397.2
Source 1: Met Éireann
Source 2: NOAA Servizio Meteorologico (extremes)

Climate data for Merrion Square, Dublin, (1991–2020), elevation: 13 m (43 ft)
Month	Jan	Feb	Mar	Apr	May	Jun	Jul	Aug	Sep	Oct	Nov	Dec	Year
Record high °C (°F)	17.5 (63.5)	17.2 (63.0)	19.6 (67.3)	22.7 (72.9)	24.1 (75.4)	27.7 (81.9)	29.1 (84.4)	30.0 (86.0)	26.2 (79.2)	22.5 (72.5)	18.6 (65.5)	16.6 (61.9)	30.0 (86.0)
Mean daily maximum °C (°F)	8.8 (47.8)	9.1 (48.4)	10.7 (51.3)	12.6 (54.7)	15.4 (59.7)	18.1 (64.6)	20.1 (68.2)	19.6 (67.3)	17.4 (63.3)	14.2 (57.6)	11.1 (52.0)	9.2 (48.6)	13.9 (57.0)
Mean daily minimum °C (°F)	4.1 (39.4)	4.2 (39.6)	5.1 (41.2)	6.6 (43.9)	9.1 (48.4)	11.7 (53.1)	13.5 (56.3)	13.3 (55.9)	11.3 (52.3)	8.9 (48.0)	6.1 (43.0)	4.4 (39.9)	8.2 (46.8)
Record low °C (°F)	−8.1 (17.4)	−4.6 (23.7)	−4.2 (24.4)	−2.5 (27.5)	0.4 (32.7)	4.2 (39.6)	7.8 (46.0)	6.4 (43.5)	3.6 (38.5)	0.1 (32.2)	−5.1 (22.8)	−7.6 (18.3)	−8.1 (17.4)
Average precipitation mm (inches)	61.2 (2.41)	49.0 (1.93)	50.0 (1.97)	48.5 (1.91)	53.6 (2.11)	60.4 (2.38)	57.9 (2.28)	64.1 (2.52)	60.6 (2.39)	75.0 (2.95)	80.6 (3.17)	65.5 (2.58)	726.4 (28.6)
Average precipitation days (≥ 1 mm)	12.0	9.9	9.0	9.9	9.6	8.8	10.5	9.7	9.5	11.0	11.6	11.8	123.3
Source 1: Met Éireann
Source 2: European Climate Assessment & Dataset

== Cityscape ==
=== Areas ===
==== City centre ====
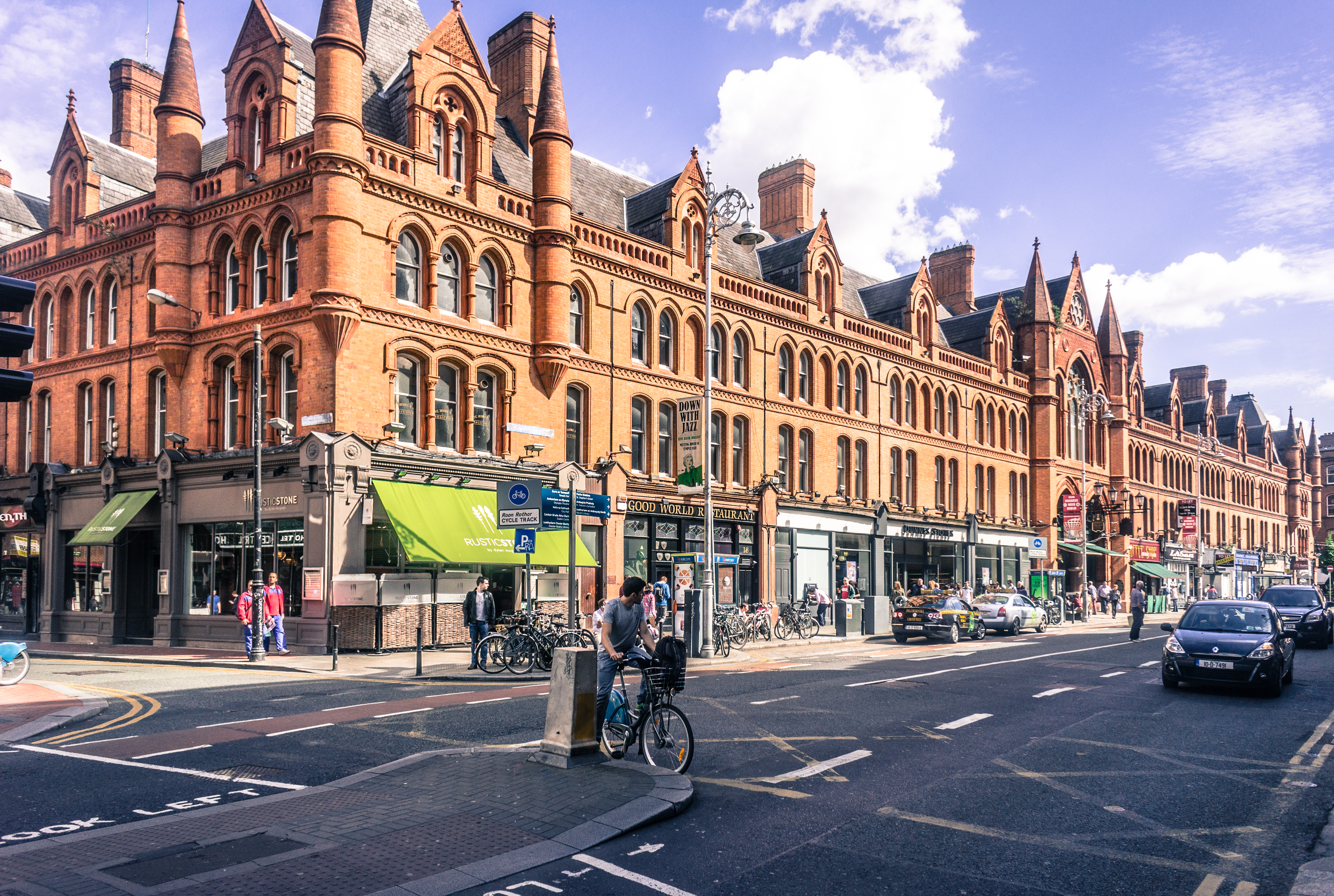
Victorian-era buildings, such as the George's Street Arcade, are typical in the south inner city.

The historic city centre of Dublin is encircled by the Royal Canal and Grand Canal, bounded to the west by Heuston railway station and Phoenix Park, and to the east by the IFSC and the Docklands. O'Connell Street is the main thoroughfare of the inner city, and many Dublin Bus routes, as well as the Green line of the Luas, have a stop at O'Connell Street. The main shopping streets of the inner city include Henry Street on the Northside, and Grafton Street on the Southside.

In some tourism and real-estate marketing contexts, inner Dublin is sometimes divided into a number of quarters. These include the Medieval Quarter (in the area of Dublin Castle, Christ Church and St Patrick's Cathedral and the old city walls), the Georgian Quarter (including the area around St Stephen's Green, Trinity College, and Merrion Square), the Docklands Quarter (around the Dublin Docklands and Silicon Docks), the Cultural Quarter (around Temple Bar), and Creative Quarter (between South William Street and George's Street).

==== Suburbs ====
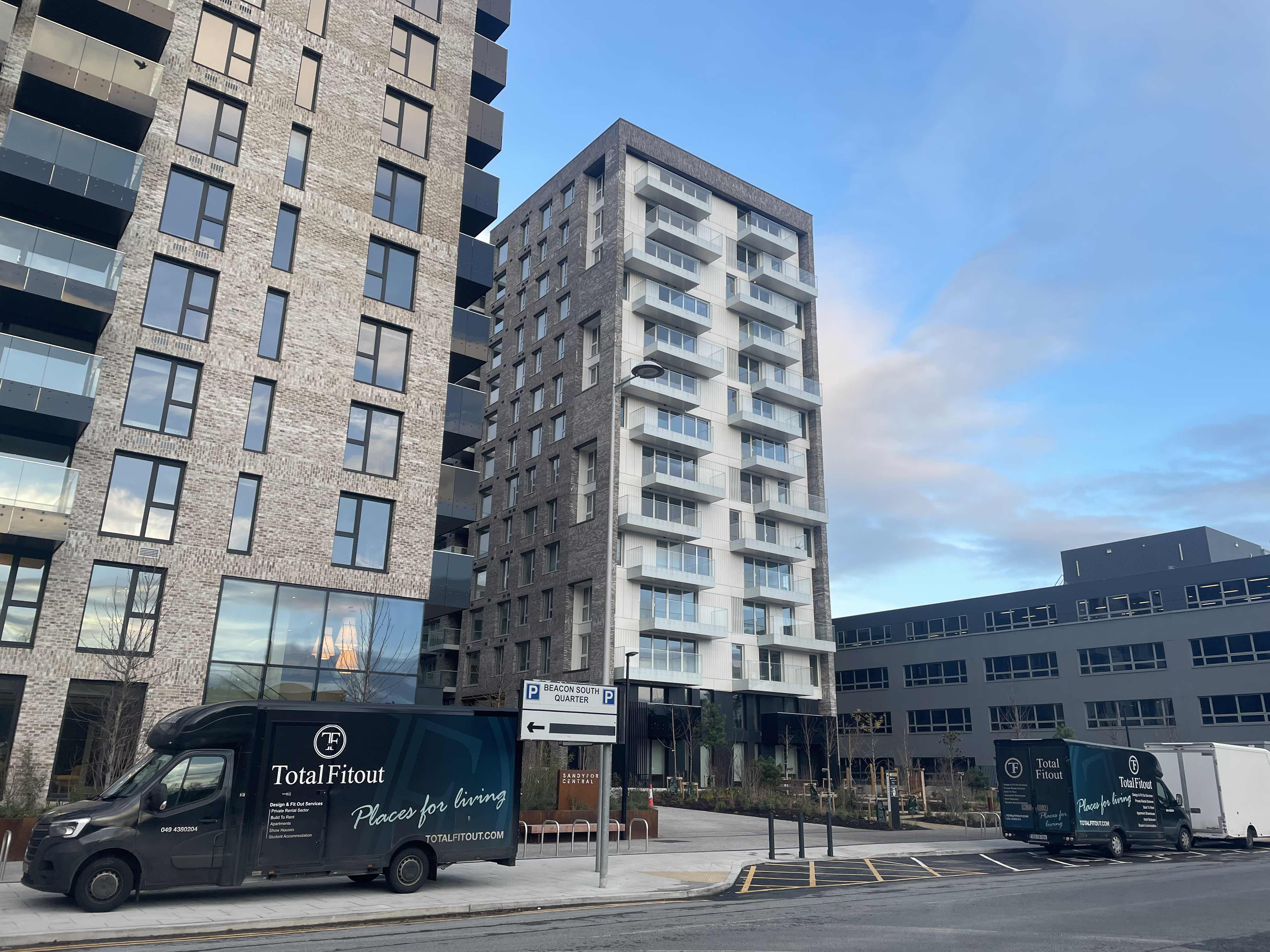
High density apartments in Sandyford

Dublin has dozens of suburbs; northside suburbs include Blanchardstown, Finglas, Ballymun, Clontarf, Raheny, Malahide and Howth, while southside suburbs include Tallaght, Sandyford, Templeogue, Drimnagh, Rathmines, Dún Laoghaire and Dalkey.

Starting in the late 2010s, there was a significant amount of high density residential developments in the suburbs of Dublin, with mid to high-rise apartments being built in Sandyford, Ashtown, and Tallaght.

=== Cultural divide ===
A north–south division once, to some extent, traditionally existed, with the River Liffey as the divider. The southside was, in recent times, generally seen as being more affluent and genteel than the northside. There have also been some social divisions evident between the coastal suburbs in the east of the city, and the newer developments further to the west.

=== Landmarks ===
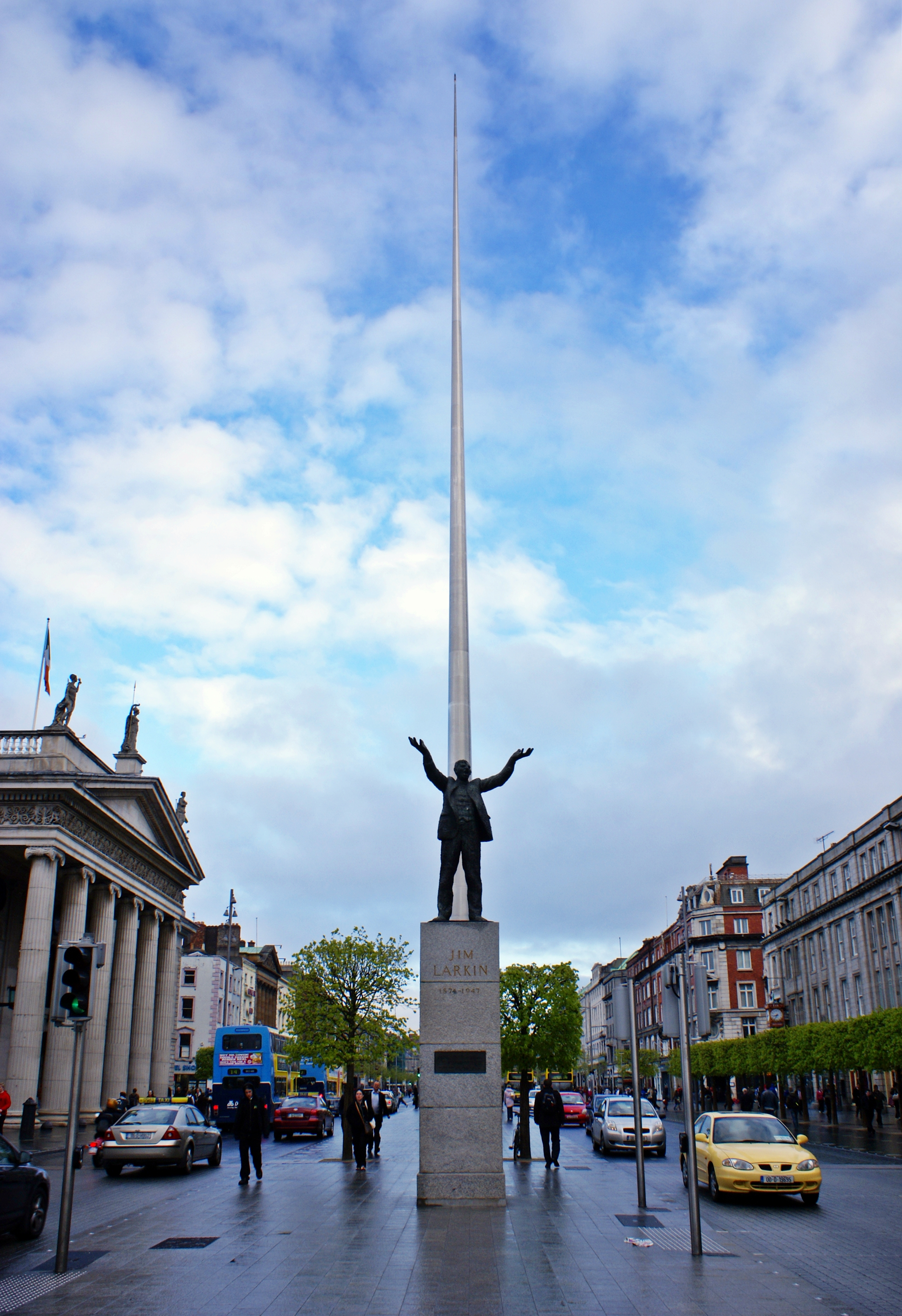
The Spire of Dublin rises behind the statue of Jim Larkin.

Dublin has many landmarks and monuments dating back hundreds of years. One of the oldest is Dublin Castle, which was first founded as a major defensive work on the orders of England's King John in 1204, shortly after the Norman invasion of Ireland in 1169, when it was commanded that a castle be built with strong walls and good ditches for the defence of the city, the administration of justice, and the protection of the King's treasure. Largely complete by 1230, the castle was of typical Norman courtyard design, with a central square without a keep, bounded on all sides by tall defensive walls and protected at each corner by a circular tower. Sited to the south-east of Norman Dublin, the castle formed one corner of the outer perimeter of the city, using the River Poddle as a natural means of defence.

One of Dublin's most prominent landmarks is the Spire of Dublin, officially entitled the "Monument of Light". It is a 121.2-metre (398 ft) conical spire made of stainless steel, completed in 2003 and located on O'Connell Street, where it meets Henry Street and North Earl Street. It replaced Nelson's Pillar and is intended to mark Dublin's place in the 21st century. The spire was designed by Ian Ritchie Architects, who sought an "Elegant and dynamic simplicity bridging art and technology". The base of the monument is lit, and its top is illuminated to serve as a beacon in the night sky across the city.

The Old Library of Trinity College Dublin, holding the Book of Kells, is one of the city's most visited sites. The Book of Kells is an illustrated manuscript created by Irish monks circa 800 AD. The Ha'penny Bridge, an iron footbridge over the River Liffey, is one of the most photographed sights in Dublin and is considered to be one of Dublin's most iconic landmarks.

Other landmarks and monuments include Christ Church Cathedral and St Patrick's Cathedral, the Mansion House, the Molly Malone statue, the complex of buildings around Leinster House, including part of the National Museum of Ireland and the National Library of Ireland, the Custom House and Áras an Uachtaráin. Other sights include the Anna Livia monument. The Poolbeg Towers are also landmark features of Dublin, and visible from various spots around the city.

=== Parks ===
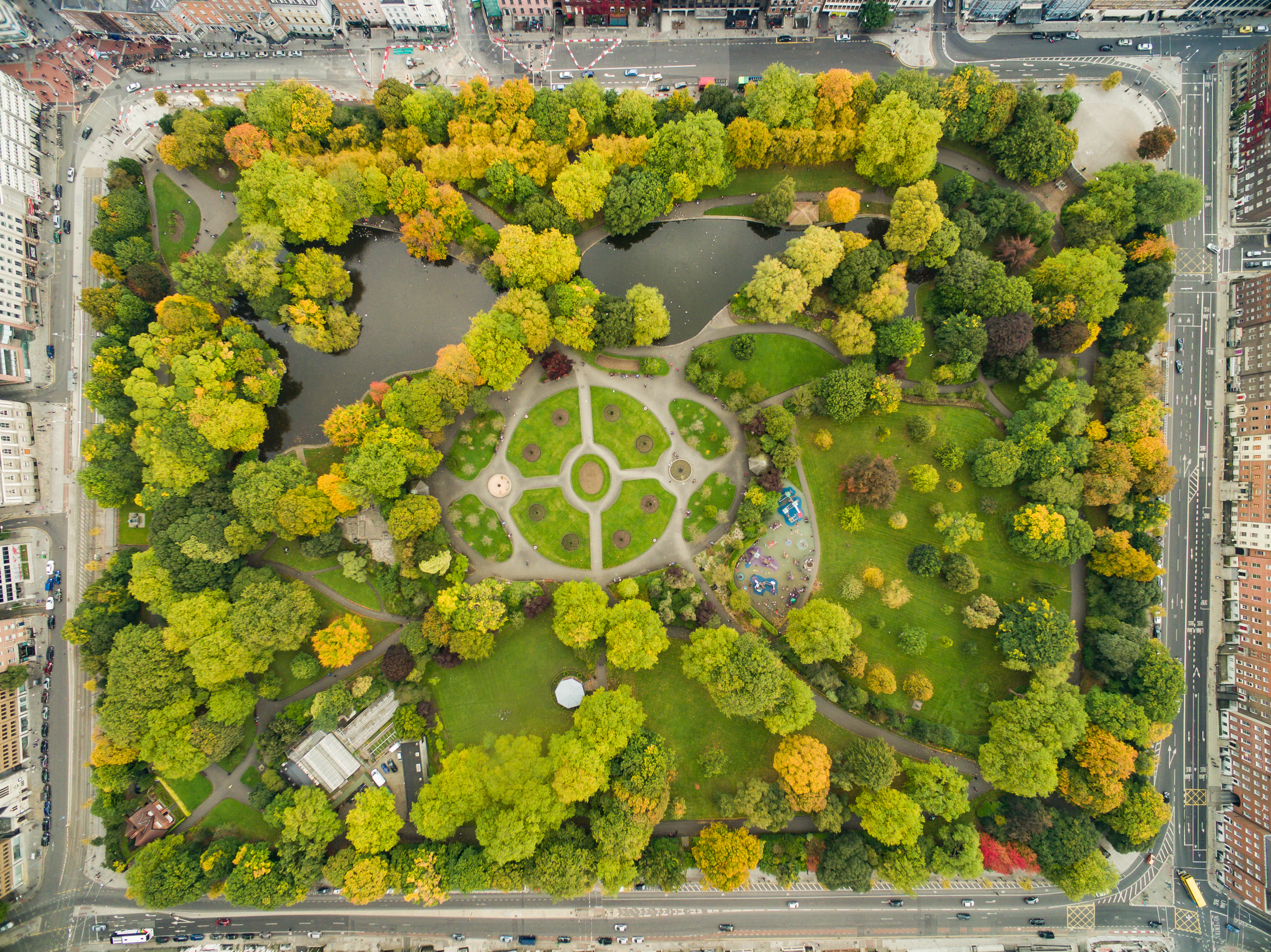
An aerial view of St Stephen's Green

There are 66 green spaces, including 34 parks, within Dublin as of 2022, with Dublin City Council managing over 1,500 hectares (3,700 acres) of parks. Public parks include the Phoenix Park, Herbert Park, St Stephen's Green, Saint Anne's Park and Bull Island. The Phoenix Park is about 3 km (2 miles) west of the city centre, north of the River Liffey. Its 16-kilometre (10 mi) perimeter wall encloses 707 hectares (1,750 acres), making it one of the largest walled city parks in Europe. It includes large areas of grassland and tree-lined avenues, and since the 17th century has been home to a herd of wild fallow deer. The residence of the President of Ireland (Áras an Uachtaráin), which was built in 1751, is located in the park. The park is also home to Dublin Zoo, Ashtown Castle, and the official residence of the United States Ambassador. Music concerts are also sometimes held in the park.

St Stephen's Green is adjacent to one of Dublin's main shopping streets, Grafton Street, and to a shopping centre named after it, while on its surrounding streets are the offices of several public bodies.

Saint Anne's Park is a public park and recreational facility, shared between Raheny and Clontarf, both suburbs on the Northside. The park, the second-largest municipal park in Dublin, is part of a former 2-square-kilometre (0.8 sq mi; 500-acre) estate assembled by members of the Guinness family, beginning with Benjamin Lee Guinness in 1835. The largest municipal park is adjacent (North) Bull Island, also shared between Clontarf and Raheny, featuring a 5 km beach, Dollymount Strand.

=== City boundaries ===
From 1842, the boundaries of the city were comprehended by the baronies of Dublin City and the barony of Dublin. Over time, the city has absorbed areas previously administered as part of County Dublin (now the three counties of Dún Laoghaire–Rathdown, Fingal, and South Dublin), with a change in 1985 also returning areas to the county.

Changes to city boundaries
Year	Changes
1900	Transfer of former urban districts of Clontarf, Drumcondra, Clonliffe and Glasnevin, and New Kilmainham from County Dublin
1930	Transfer of former urban districts of Pembroke and Rathmines and Rathgar from County Dublin
1931	Transfer of Drumcondra, Glasnevin, Donnybrook and Terenure from County Dublin
1941	Transfer of Crumlin from County Dublin
1942	Transfer of former urban district of Howth from County Dublin
1953	Transfer of Finglas, Coolock and Ballyfermot from County Dublin.
1985	Transfer of Santry and Phoenix Park from County Dublin; transfer of Howth, Sutton and parts of Kilbarrack including Bayside to County Dublin
1994	Alterations to western boundaries in the vicinities of Ballyfermot and Cabra on establishment of new counties

== Economy ==
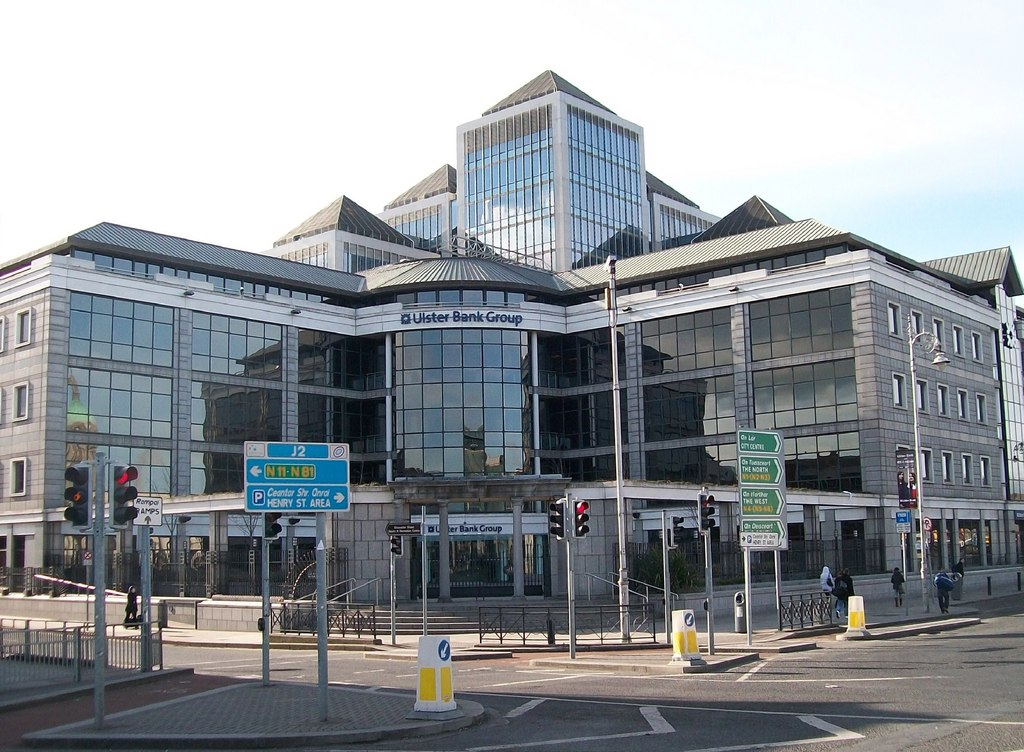
Ulster Bank on George's Quay Plaza

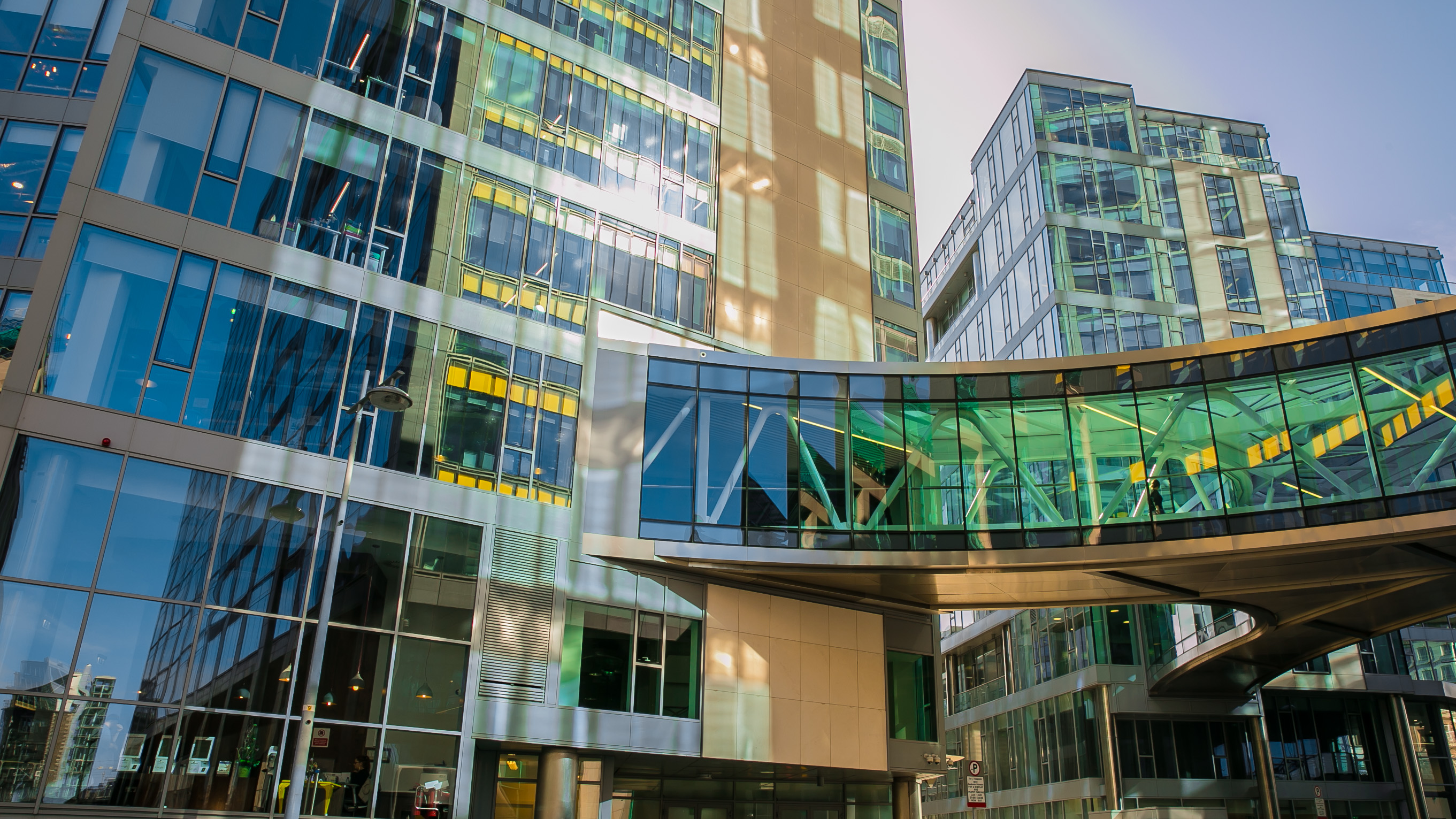
Google headquarters in Dublin

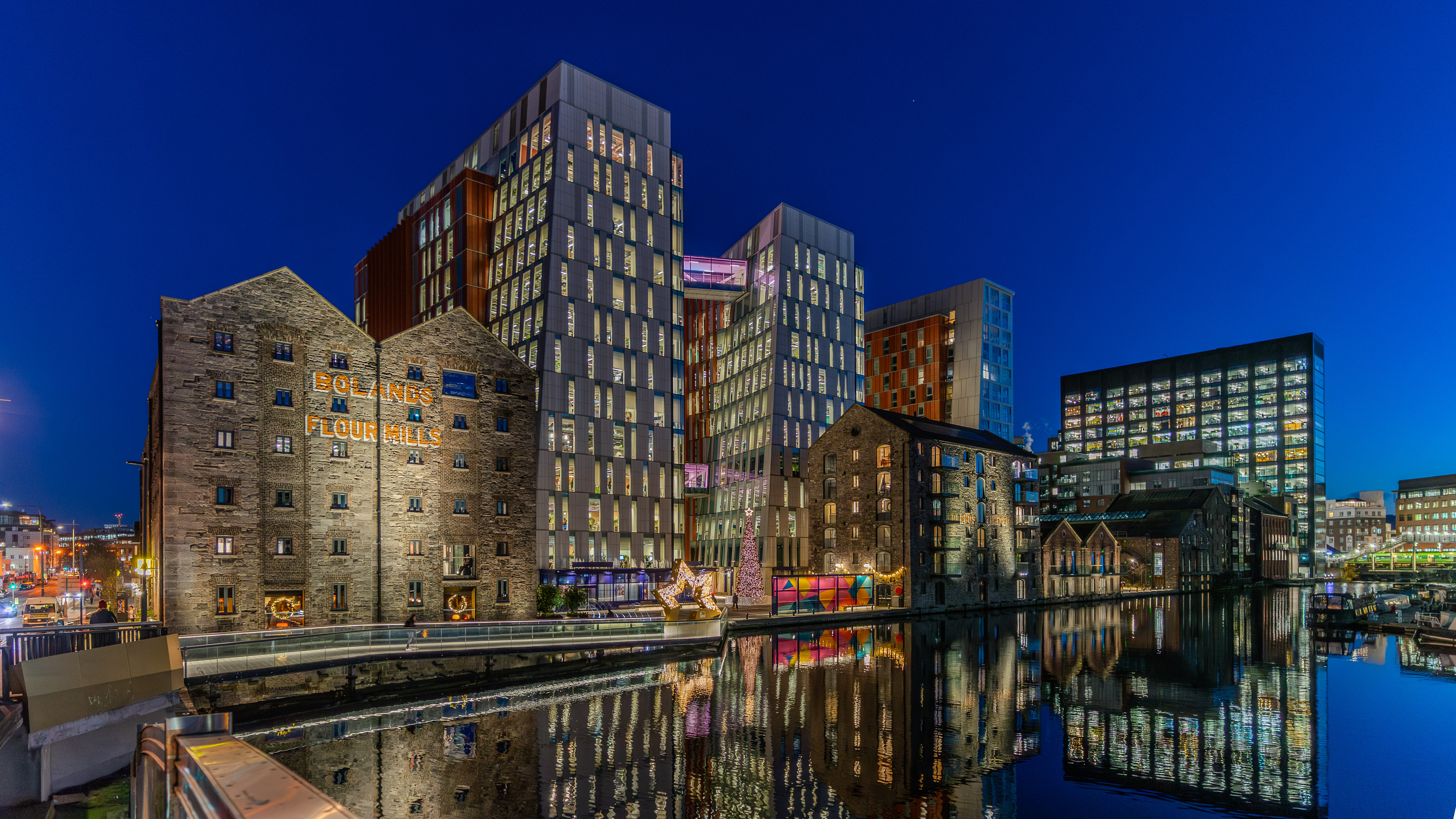
View of Boland's Mills

The Dublin region is the economic centre of Ireland, and was at the forefront of the country's economic expansion during the Celtic Tiger period. In 2009, Dublin was listed as the fourth richest city in the world by purchasing power and 10th richest by personal income. According to Mercer's 2011 Worldwide Cost of Living Survey, Dublin was the 13th most expensive city in the European Union (down from 10th in 2010) and the 58th most expensive place to live in the world (down from 42nd in 2010). As of 2017, approximately 874,400 people were employed in the Greater Dublin Area. Around 60% of people employed in Ireland's financial, ICT, and professional sectors are based in this area.

Several of Dublin's traditional industries, such as food processing, textile manufacturing, brewing, and distilling, have gradually declined, although Guinness has been brewed at the St. James's Gate Brewery since 1759. Economic improvements in the 1990s attracted some global pharmaceutical and information and communications technology companies to the city and the Greater Dublin Area. Companies such as Microsoft, Google, Amazon, Salesforce, eBay, PayPal, Yahoo!, Facebook, X, Accenture, TikTok, and Pfizer now have European headquarters or operational bases in the city, with several located in enterprise clusters like the Digital Hub and Silicon Docks. The presence of these companies has driven economic expansion in the city and has led Dublin to be referred to as the "Tech Capital of Europe".

Financial services have also become important to the city since the establishment of Dublin's International Financial Services Centre in 1987. More than 500 operations are approved to trade under the IFSC programme. The centre is host to half of the world's top 50 banks and to half of the top 20 insurance companies. Many international firms have established major headquarters in the city, such as Citibank. The Irish Stock Exchange (ISEQ), Internet Neutral Exchange (INEX), and Irish Enterprise Exchange (IEX) are also located in Dublin. Dublin has been positioned as one of the main cities vying to host Financial Services companies hoping to retain access to the Eurozone after Brexit. The Celtic Tiger also led to a temporary construction boom, with large redevelopment projects in the Dublin Docklands and Spencer Dock. Completed projects include the Convention Centre, the 3Arena, and the Bord Gáis Energy Theatre.

In the second quarter of 2018, Dublin touched its lowest unemployment rate in a decade, when it fell down to 5.7% as reported by the Dublin Economic Monitor. In November 2022, Dublin was ranked as one of the worst cities in the world for travel, health and cost of living. On 24 September 2022, thousands took to the streets in protest against the cost of living crisis.

As of 2024, Dublin's gross domestic product is €253.6 billion, making it one of the largest city economies in the European Union.

== Transport ==
=== Road ===
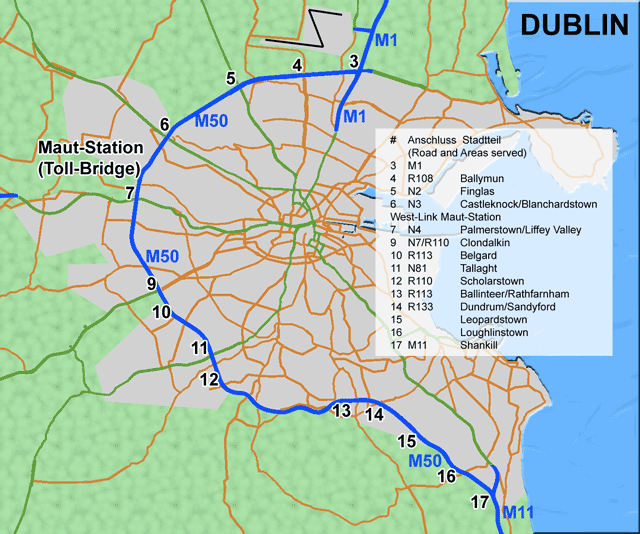
The M50 motorway surrounding Dublin

The road network in Ireland is primarily focused on Dublin. The M50 motorway, a semi-ring road which runs around the south, west, and north of the city, connects important national primary routes to the rest of the country. In 2008, the West-Link toll bridge was replaced by the eFlow barrier-free tolling system, with a three-tiered charge system based on electronic tags and car pre-registration.

The first phase of a proposed eastern bypass for the city is the Dublin Port Tunnel, which officially opened in 2006 to cater mainly for heavy vehicles. The tunnel connects Dublin Port and the M1 motorway close to Dublin Airport. An inner and outer orbital route also surrounds the city. The inner orbital route runs approximately around the heart of the Georgian city. The outer orbital route runs primarily along the natural circle formed by Dublin's two canals, the Grand Canal and the Royal Canal, as well as the North and South Circular Roads.

The 2016 TomTom Traffic Index ranked Dublin the 15th most congested city in the world and the 7th most congested in Europe.

==== Bus ====
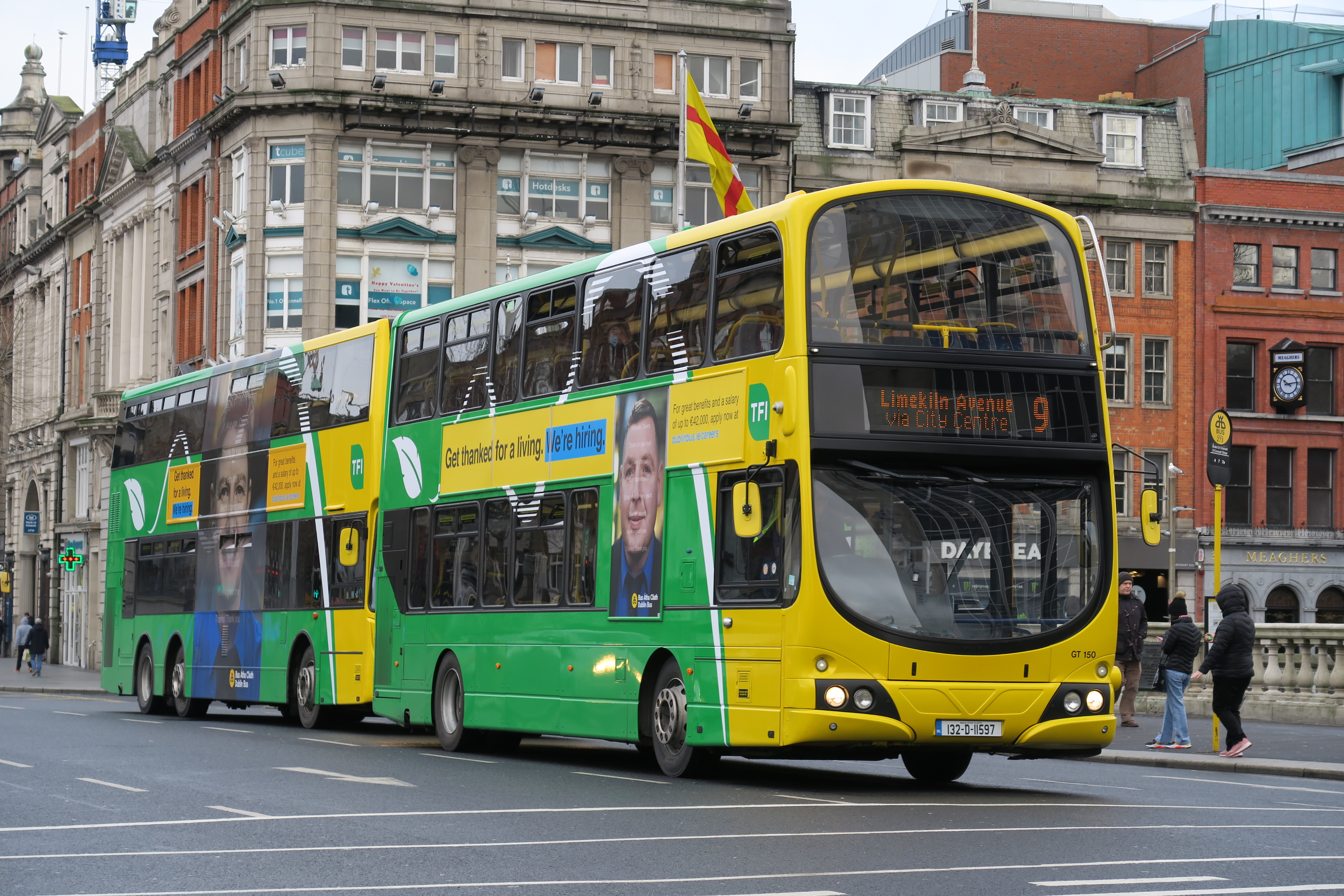
Dublin Bus

Dublin is served by a network of nearly 200 bus routes that cover the city and its suburbs. The majority of these are provided by Dublin Bus, with a modest number having been transferred to Go Ahead Ireland since 2018. Several smaller companies also operate. Fares are generally calculated on a stage system based on distance travelled. Several fare levels apply to most services. A "Real Time Passenger Information" system was introduced at Dublin Bus bus stops in 2012, which displays the projected arrival time of the next bus based on its GPS position. The National Transport Authority is responsible for integrating bus and rail services in Dublin. It has been involved in introducing a pre-paid smart card, called a TFI Leap Card, which can be used on all of Dublin's public transport services.

The BusConnects programme includes several proposed improvements to Dublin's bus network, including new spine and orbital routes. The spine routes are intended to increase the frequency of buses along major corridors, and the orbital routes aim to "provide connections between suburbs and town centres, without having to travel into the City Centre". In 2022, Dublin Bus began the process of electrifying its fleet with new battery-powered buses, with plans for 85% of Dublin buses to be zero-emission by 2032.

==== Cycling ====
In the early twentieth century, cycling was the most common way of commuting to work in Dublin, and in 1934, a journalist in The Irish Press described Dublin as "third of the cities of Europe for bicycles in proportion to the population" after Amsterdam and Copenhagen. In April 1961, bicycle journeys accounted for 27.4% of all journeys across Dublin and Dún Laoghaire. During the rest of the 1960s, cycle use collapsed due to the growing affordability of the motorcar as well as the rise of mass motorization, which made cycling less appealing.

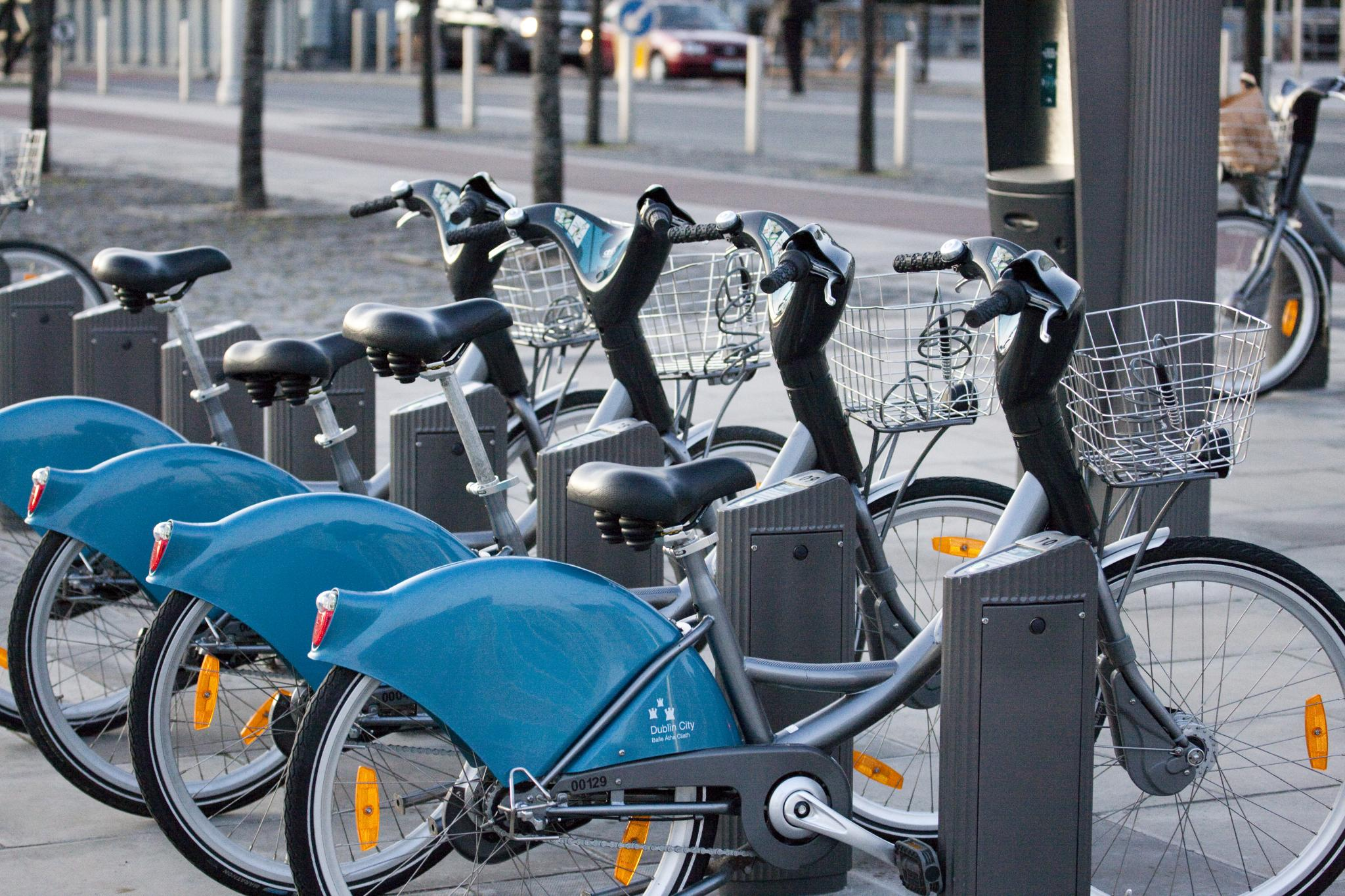
Dublinbikes terminal in the Docklands

The 2011 census indicated that 5.9% of commuters in Dublin cycled. A 2013 report by Dublin City Council on traffic flows crossing the canals in and out of the city found that just under 10% of all traffic was made up of cyclists, representing an increase of 14.1% over 2012 and an 87.2% increase over 2006 levels. The increase was attributed to measures such as the Dublinbikes bike rental scheme, the provision of cycle lanes, public awareness campaigns promoting cycling, and the introduction of the 30 km/h city centre speed limit.

Dublin City Council began installing cycle lanes and tracks throughout the city in the 1990s, and as of 2012, the city had over 200 kilometres (120 miles) of specific on- and off-road tracks for cyclists. In 2011, the city was ranked 9th of major world cities on the Copenhagenize Index of Bicycle-Friendly Cities. The same index showed a fall to 15th in 2015, and Dublin was outside the top 20 in 2017. BusConnects aims to deliver 200 kilometres of cycle tracks in 12 separate schemes across the city.

Dublinbikes is a self-service bicycle rental scheme which has been in operation in Dublin since 2009. Sponsored by JCDecaux and Just Eat, the scheme comprises hundreds of unisex bicycles stationed at 44 terminals across the city centre. Users must either subscribe to an annual Long Term Hire Card or purchase a three-day ticket. As of 2018, Dublinbikes had over 66,000 long-term subscribers making over 2 million journeys per year.

=== Rail ===
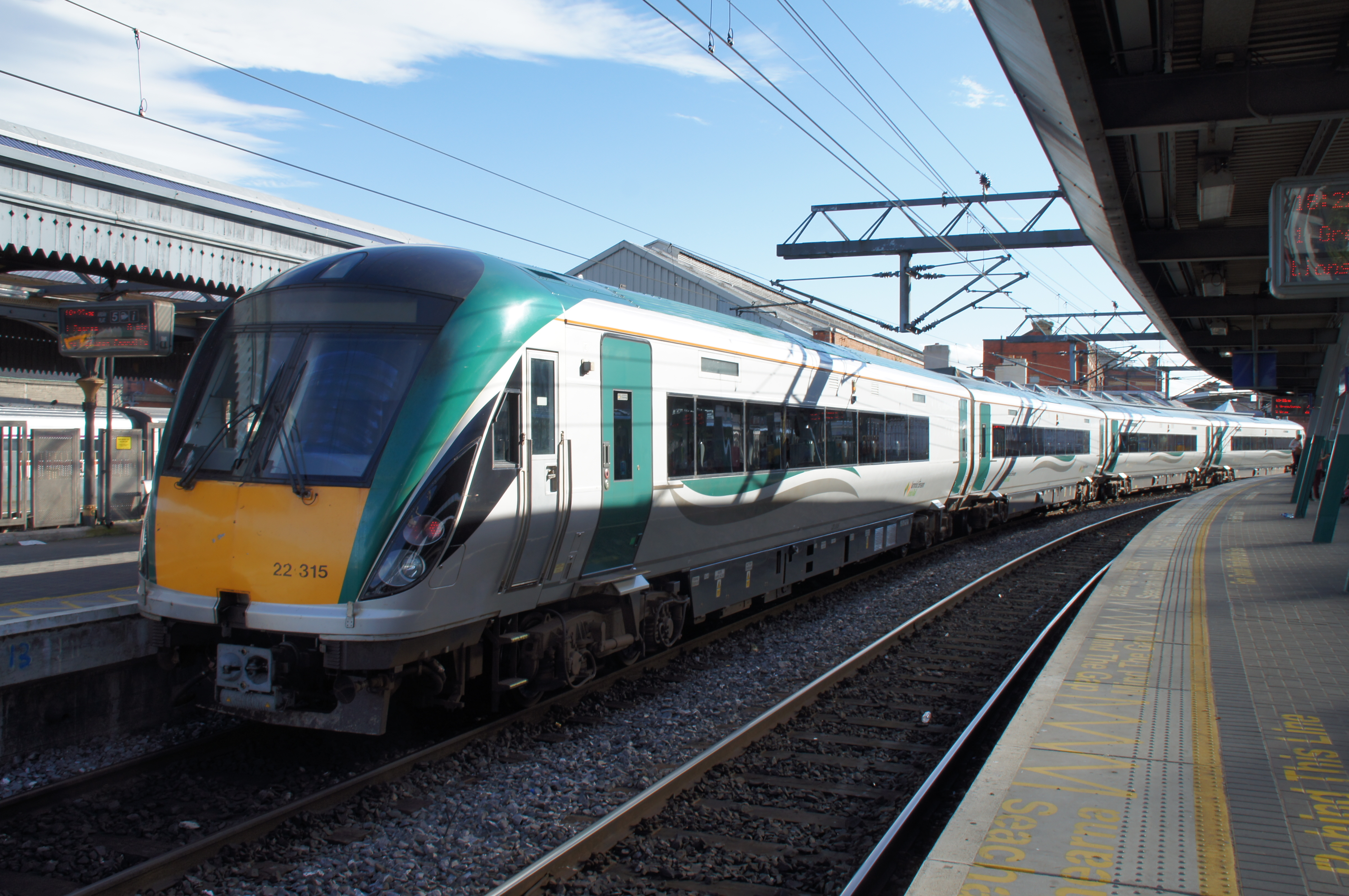
Dublin Connolly

Heuston and Connolly stations are the two main railway termini in Dublin. The Dublin Suburban Rail network consists of five railway lines serving the Greater Dublin Area and outlying commuter towns. Iarnród Éireann provides Commuter services from Connolly station northwards to Drogheda and Dundalk; westwards to Maynooth, M3 Parkway and Longford; and from Heuston station southwestwards to Portlaoise. Commuter services are operated using diesel multiple units. The Dublin Area Rapid Transit (DART) network, an electrified commuter railway network which runs primarily along the coast of Dublin, was launched in 1984. The DART consists of 32 stations as of 2025, running from Malahide and Howth southwards as far as Bray and Greystones. The network is being significantly expanded in the 2020s as part of the DART+ project, with future services to run to Drogheda, Maynooth, M3 Parkway and Hazelhatch and Celbridge. In 2025, passengers for Dublin suburban services and the DART were 14.3 million and 22.6 million, respectively.

Iarnród Éireann also provides InterCity services from Heuston station to Cork, Galway, Waterford, Tralee, Westport and Limerick; and from Connolly station to Sligo and Rosslare Europort. Enterprise, a cross-border inter-city rail service between Dublin and Belfast, was launched in 1947 and is jointly operated by Iarnród Éireann and NI Railways.

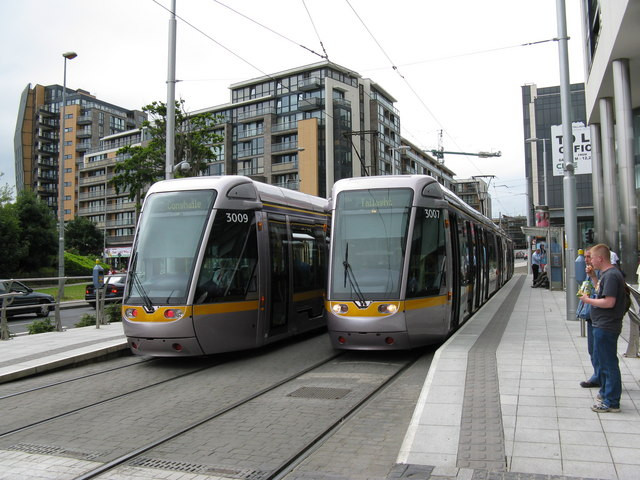
Luas trams at the Tallaght terminus

Dublin once had an extensive system of trams, but this was largely phased out by 1949. A new light rail system, often described as a tram system, the Luas was launched in 2004. The Luas is operated by the KeolisAmey, having been operated from commencement to August 2026 by Transdev, and carried 55 million passengers in 2025. The network consists of two interconnecting lines; the Red Line links the Docklands and city centre with the south-western suburbs of Tallaght and Saggart, while the Green Line connects northern inner city suburbs and the main city centre with suburbs to the south of the city including Sandyford and Brides Glen, mostly along the former route of the Harcourt Street railway line. Together, these lines comprise a total of 67 stops and 44.5 kilometres (27.7 mi) of track. Construction of a 6 km extension to the Green Line, bringing it into the north of the city, commenced in June 2013 and was opened for passenger travel on 9 December 2017.

A metro service is proposed under the name of Metrolink, and planned to run from Dublin's northside to Charlemont via Dublin Airport and St. Stephen's Green.

=== Rail and ferry ===
Dublin Connolly is connected by bus to Dublin Port and ferries run by Irish Ferries and Stena Line to Holyhead for connecting trains on the North Wales Coast Line to Chester, Crewe and London Euston. Dublin Connolly to Dublin Port can be reached via Amiens Street, Dublin into Store Street or by Luas via Busáras where Dublin Bus operates route 53 to the Irish Ferries Terminal.

=== Air ===
==== Dublin Airport ====
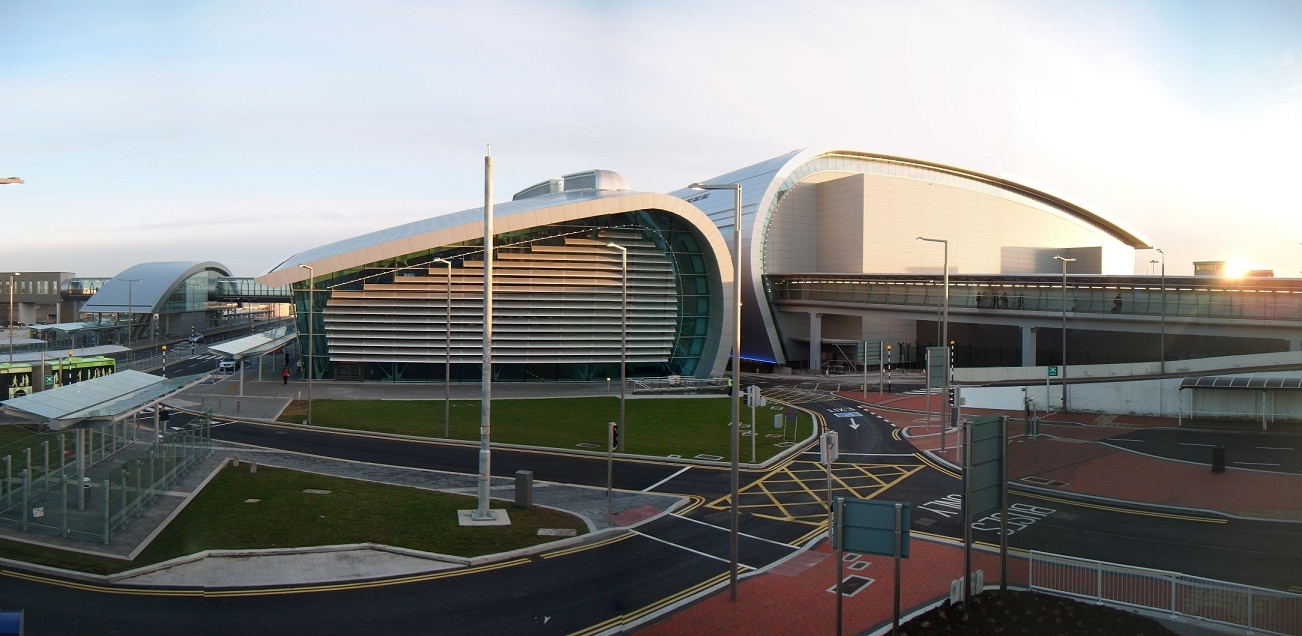
Dublin Airport

Dublin Airport (owned and operated by DAA) is located north of Dublin city, near Swords in the administrative county of Fingal. The headquarters of Ireland's flag carrier Aer Lingus and regional airline CityJet are located there, and those of low-cost carrier Ryanair are nearby. The airport offers a short and medium-haul network, domestic services to regional airports in Ireland, and long-haul services to the United States, Canada, and the Middle East. Dublin Airport is the 11th busiest in the European Union, and by far the busiest airport on the island of Ireland.

In 2015 and 2016, transatlantic traffic grew, with 158 summer flights a week to North America, making it the sixth-largest European hub for that route over the year. Transatlantic traffic was also the fastest-growing segment of the market for the airport in 2016, in which a 16% increase from 2015 brought the yearly number of passengers travelling between Dublin and North America to 2.9 million.

From 2010 to 2016, Dublin Airport saw an increase of nearly 9.5 million passengers in its annual traffic, as the number of commercial aircraft movements also grew from 163,703 in 2013 to 191,233 in 2015. Passenger traffic has continued to increase during the 2020s. In 2025, 36.4 million passengers passed through the airport, making it the airport's busiest year on record.

==== Other air transport ====
Dublin is also served by Weston Airport and other small facilities, by a range of helicopter operators, and the military and some State services use Casement Aerodrome nearby.

== Education ==
Dublin is the largest centre of education in Ireland, and is home to four universities and several other higher education institutions. It was the European Capital of Science in 2012.

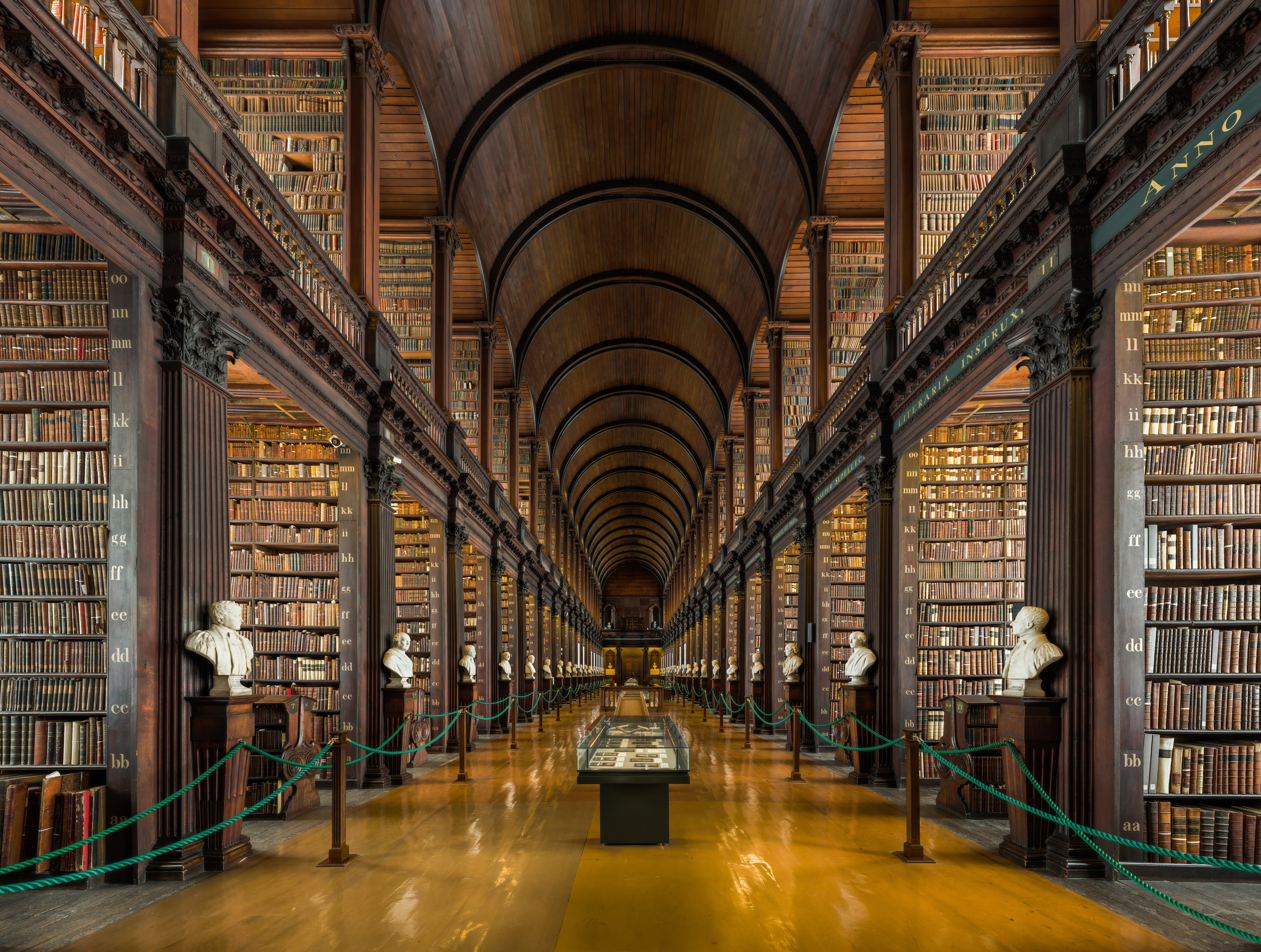
The Old Library at Trinity College

The University of Dublin is the oldest university in Ireland, dating from the 16th century, and is located in the city centre. Its sole constituent college, Trinity College (TCD), was established by Royal Charter in 1592 under Elizabeth I. It was closed to Roman Catholics until 1793, and the Catholic hierarchy then banned Roman Catholics from attending until 1970. It is situated in the city centre, on College Green, and has over 18,000 students.

The National University of Ireland (NUI) has its seat in Dublin, which is also home to the associated constituent university of University College Dublin (UCD), which has over 30,000 students. Founded in 1854, it is now Ireland's largest university. UCD's main campus is at Belfield, about 5 km (3 mi) from the city centre, in the southeastern suburbs.

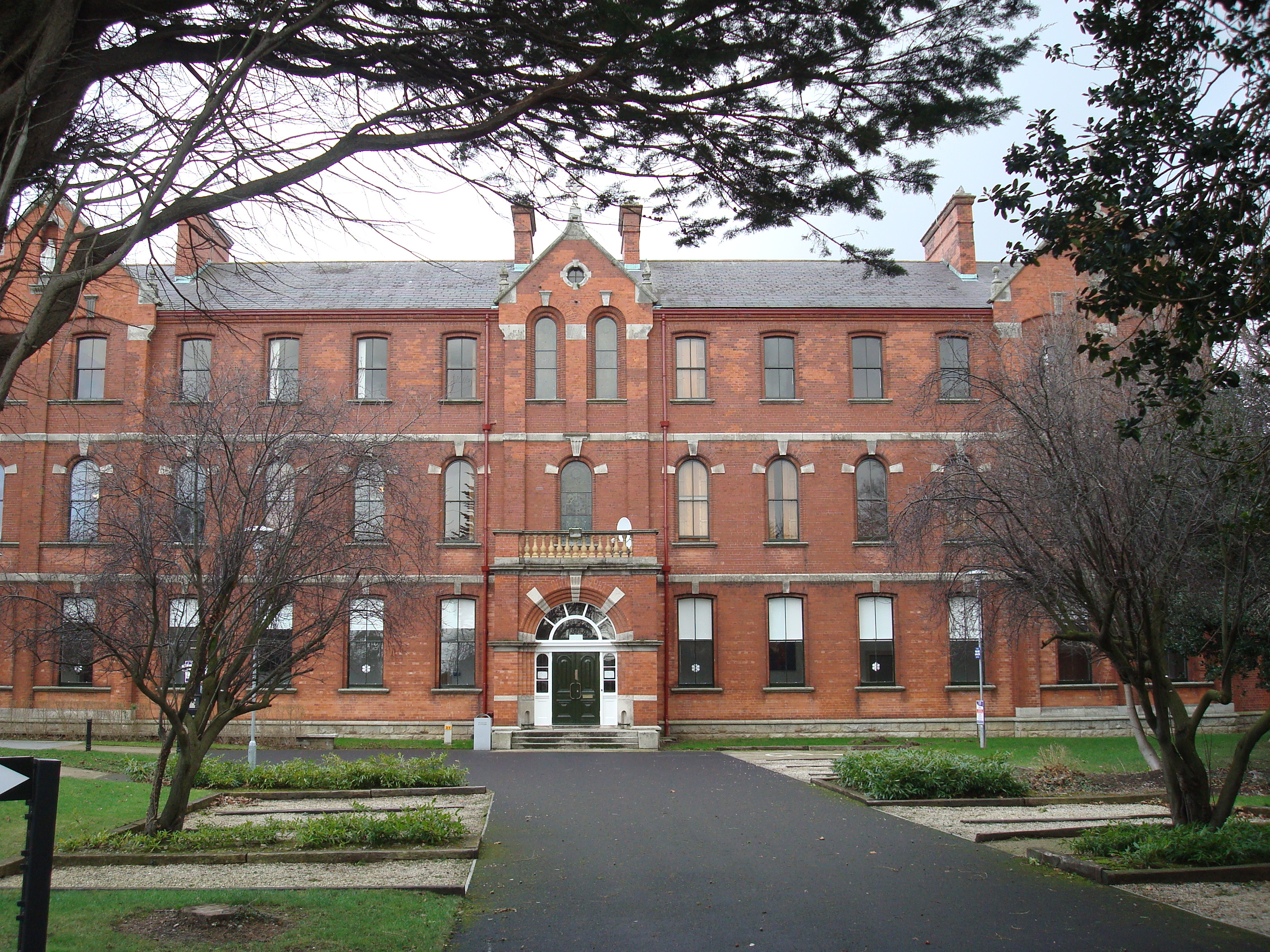
Michael Smurfit Graduate Business School

As of 2019, Dublin's principal, and Ireland's largest, institution for technological education and research, Dublin Institute of Technology (DIT), with origins in 1887, has merged with two major suburban third level institutions, Institute of Technology, Tallaght and Institute of Technology, Blanchardstown, to form Technological University Dublin, Ireland's second-largest university by student population. The new university offers a wide range of courses across engineering, architecture, the sciences, health, journalism, digital media, hospitality, business, art and design, music, and humanities. It has three long-term campuses, at Grangegorman, Tallaght, and Blanchardstown.

Dublin City University (DCU), formerly the National Institute for Higher Education (NIHE) Dublin, offers courses in business, engineering, science, communication, languages, and primary education. It has around 16,000 students, and its main campus is located about 7 km (4 mi) from the city centre, in the northern suburbs. Aside from the main Glasnevin Campus, the Drumcondra campuses include the former St. Patrick's College of Education, Drumcondra now also hosting students from the nearby Mater Dei Institute of Education and students from the Church of Ireland College of Education at the DCU Campus at All Hallows College.

The Royal College of Surgeons in Ireland (RCSI) conducts a medical school which is both a university (since 2019) and a recognised college of the NUI, and is situated at St. Stephen's Green in the city centre; there are also large medical schools within UCD and Trinity College. The National College of Art and Design (NCAD) provides education and research in art, design, and media. The National College of Ireland (NCI) is also based in Dublin, as well as the Economic and Social Research Institute, a social science research institute, on Sir John Rogerson's Quay, and the Dublin Institute for Advanced Studies.

The Institute of International and European Affairs is also in Dublin. Dublin Business School (DBS) is Ireland's largest private third-level institution, with over 9,000 students located on Aungier Street, and Griffith College Dublin has its central facility in Portobello. There are also smaller specialised colleges, including The Gaiety School of Acting. The Irish Public Administration and Management Training Centre is based in Dublin. The Institute of Public Administration provides a range of undergraduate and postgraduate awards through the National University of Ireland and, in some instances, Queen's University Belfast.

Dublin is also home to the Royal Irish Academy, whose membership is considered Ireland's highest academic honour.

The suburban town of Dún Laoghaire is home to the Dún Laoghaire Institute of Art, Design and Technology (IADT), which supports training and research in art, design, business, psychology, and media technology. Dublin joined the UNESCO Global Network of Learning Cities in 2019.

== Demographics ==
Dublin (city) population pyramid in 2022

Main immigrant groups in Dublin City and suburbs (2016)
Nationality	Population
Poland	33,751
UK	19,196
Romania	16,808
Lithuania	9,869
Brazil	8,903
Italy	6,834
India	6,546
Spain	6,341
Latvia	5,771
Mainland China	5,748
France	5,576
United States	4,042
Nigeria	2,563
Pakistan	2,515
Philippines	2,204

The City of Dublin is the area administered by Dublin City Council. The traditional County Dublin includes the city and the administrative counties of Dún Laoghaire–Rathdown, Fingal, and South Dublin. The Greater Dublin Area includes County Dublin and the adjoining counties, County Kildare, County Meath, and County Wicklow.

In the 2022 census, the population of the City of Dublin was 592,713. The population of Dublin city and suburbs was 1,263,219. County Dublin had a population of 1,458,154. The population of the Greater Dublin Area was 2,082,605.

Of the population of Dublin city and its suburbs, 62.9% (794,925) were born in Dublin, 26.6% (336,021) were born outside of Ireland, while the remaining 10.5% (132,273) were born in a county other than Dublin.

After World War II, Italians were by far the largest immigrant group in both Dublin and Ireland, and became synonymous with the catering and restaurant landscape. Since the late 1990s, Dublin has had a significant level of net immigration, with the greatest numbers coming from the European Union, especially the United Kingdom, Poland and Lithuania. There is also immigration from outside Europe, including from Pakistan, Brazil, the Philippines, China, India and Nigeria. Dublin is home to a greater proportion of newer arrivals than any other part of Ireland. Sixty percent of Ireland's Asian population lives in Dublin.

Dublin attracts the largest proportion of non-Catholic migrants from other countries. Increased secularisation in Ireland has prompted a drop in regular Catholic church attendance in Dublin from over 90 percent in the mid-1970s, down to 14 percent in a 2011 survey, and less than 2% in some areas In the 2016 census, 68.2% of Dublin's population identified as Catholic, 12.7% as other stated religions, with 19.1% having no religion or no religion stated.

In the 2022 census, the population of County Dublin self-identified as 80.4% white (68.0% white Irish, 12.0% other white, and 0.4% Irish traveller), 5.8% Asian, 3.0% mixed backgrounds, 2.2% Black, and 8.5% not stated. In the same census, the ethnic makeup of Dublin city was 76.81% white (including 64.23% white Irish and 12.19% other white people), 12.98% not stated, 5.11% Asian, 3.50% other and 1.58% black.

As of December 2024, 1,467 families were living in emergency accommodation in the Dublin region. This is a decrease of 57 from the November 2024 number and an increase of 67 compared with December 2023, when there were 1,400 families in emergency accommodation.

== Culture ==
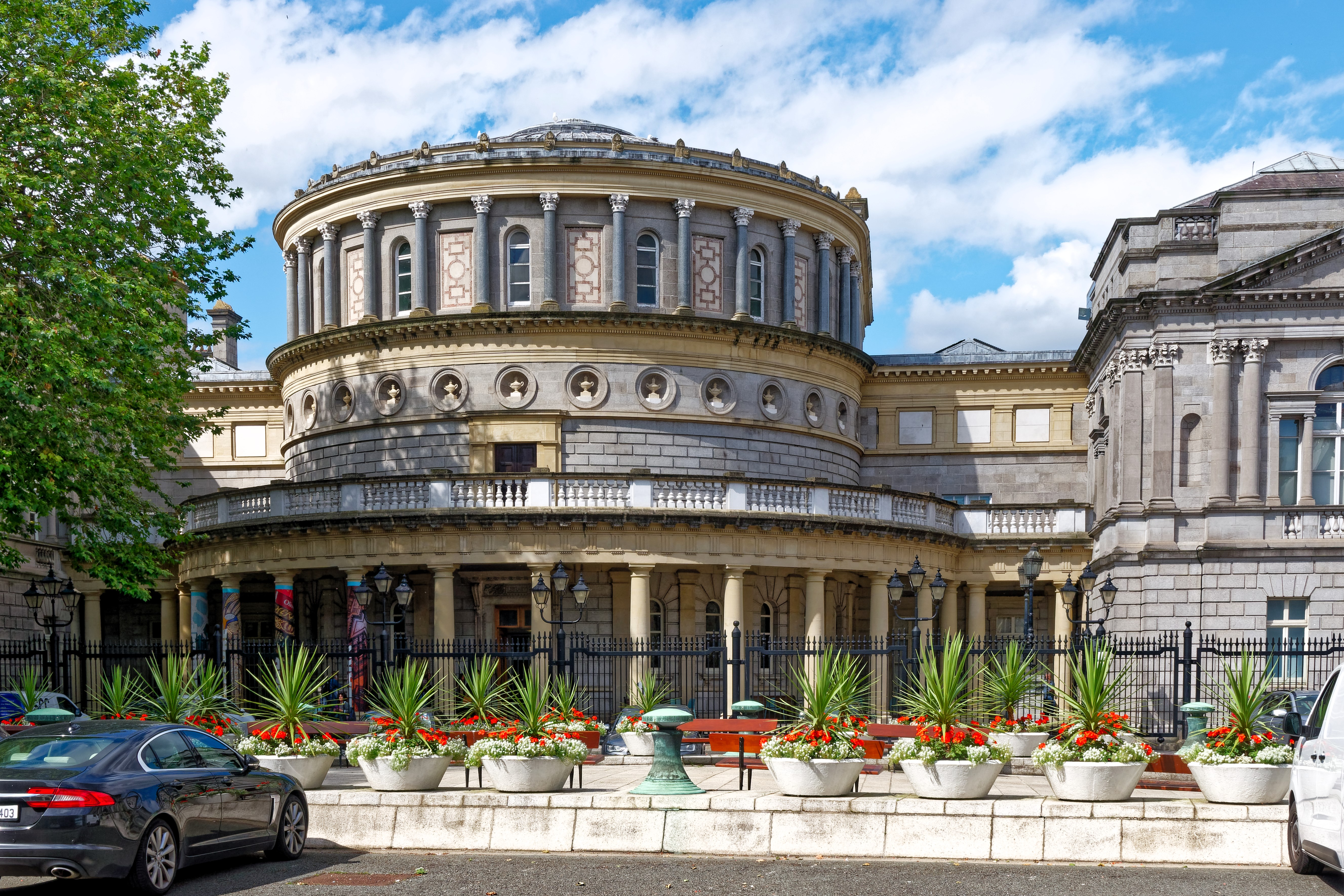
The National Museum of Ireland

=== The arts ===
Dublin has a significant literary history and produced many literary figures, including Nobel laureates William Butler Yeats, George Bernard Shaw, and Samuel Beckett. Other influential writers and playwrights include Oscar Wilde, Jonathan Swift and the creator of Dracula, Bram Stoker. It is also the location of key and notable works of James Joyce, including Ulysses, which is set in Dublin and includes much topical detail. Dubliners is a collection of short stories by Joyce about incidents and typical characters of the city during the early 20th century. Other notable writers include J. M. Synge, Seán O'Casey, Brendan Behan, Maeve Binchy, John Banville and Roddy Doyle. Ireland's biggest libraries and literary museums are found in Dublin, including the National Print Museum of Ireland and National Library of Ireland. In July 2010, Dublin was named as a UNESCO City of Literature, joining Edinburgh, Melbourne and Iowa City with the permanent title.

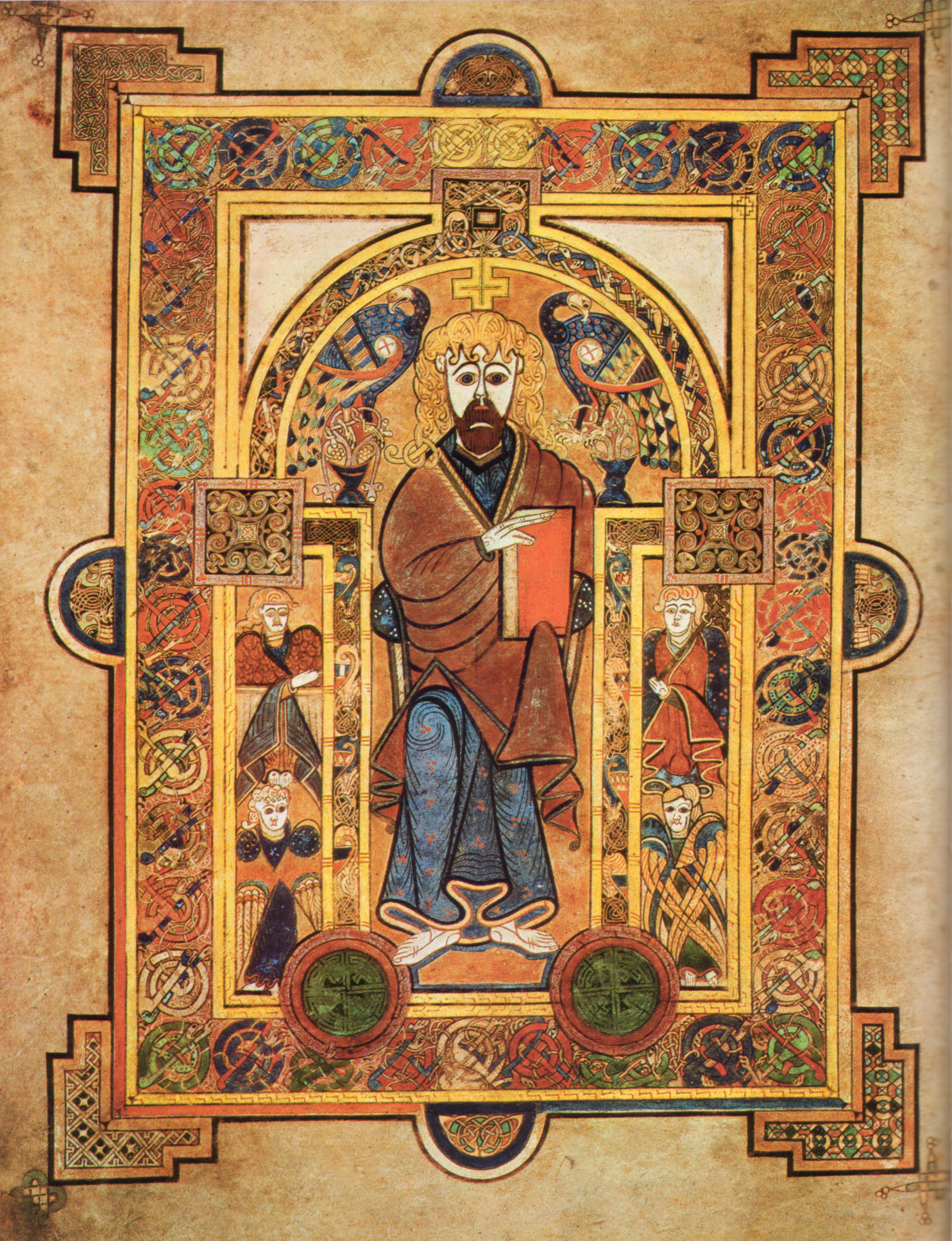
The Book of Kells

Handel's oratorio Messiah was first performed at Neal's Music Hall, in Fishamble Street, on 13 April 1742.

There are several theatres within the city centre. Various well-known actors have emerged from the Dublin theatrical scene, including Noel Purcell, Michael Gambon, Brendan Gleeson, Stephen Rea, Colin Farrell, Colm Meaney, and Gabriel Byrne. The best known theatres include the Gaiety, Abbey, Olympia, Gate, and Grand Canal. The Gaiety specialises in musical and operatic productions, and also opens its doors after the evening theatre production to host a variety of live music, dancing, and films. The Abbey was founded in 1904 by a group that included Yeats to promote indigenous literary talent. It went on to provide a breakthrough for some of the city's most famous writers, such as Synge, Yeats himself, and George Bernard Shaw. The Gate was founded in 1928 to promote European and American avant-garde works. The Grand Canal Theatre is a newer 2,111-capacity theatre that opened in 2010 in the Grand Canal Dock area.

Apart from being the focus of the country's literature and theatre, Dublin is the focal point for much of Irish art and the Irish artistic scene. The Book of Kells, a world-famous manuscript produced by Celtic monks in AD 800 and an example of Insular art, is on display in Trinity College. The Chester Beatty Library houses a collection of manuscripts, miniature paintings, prints, drawings, rare books, and decorative arts assembled by American mining millionaire (and honorary Irish citizen) Sir Alfred Chester Beatty (1875–1968). The collections date from 2700 BCE onwards and are drawn from Asia, the Middle East, North Africa, and Europe.

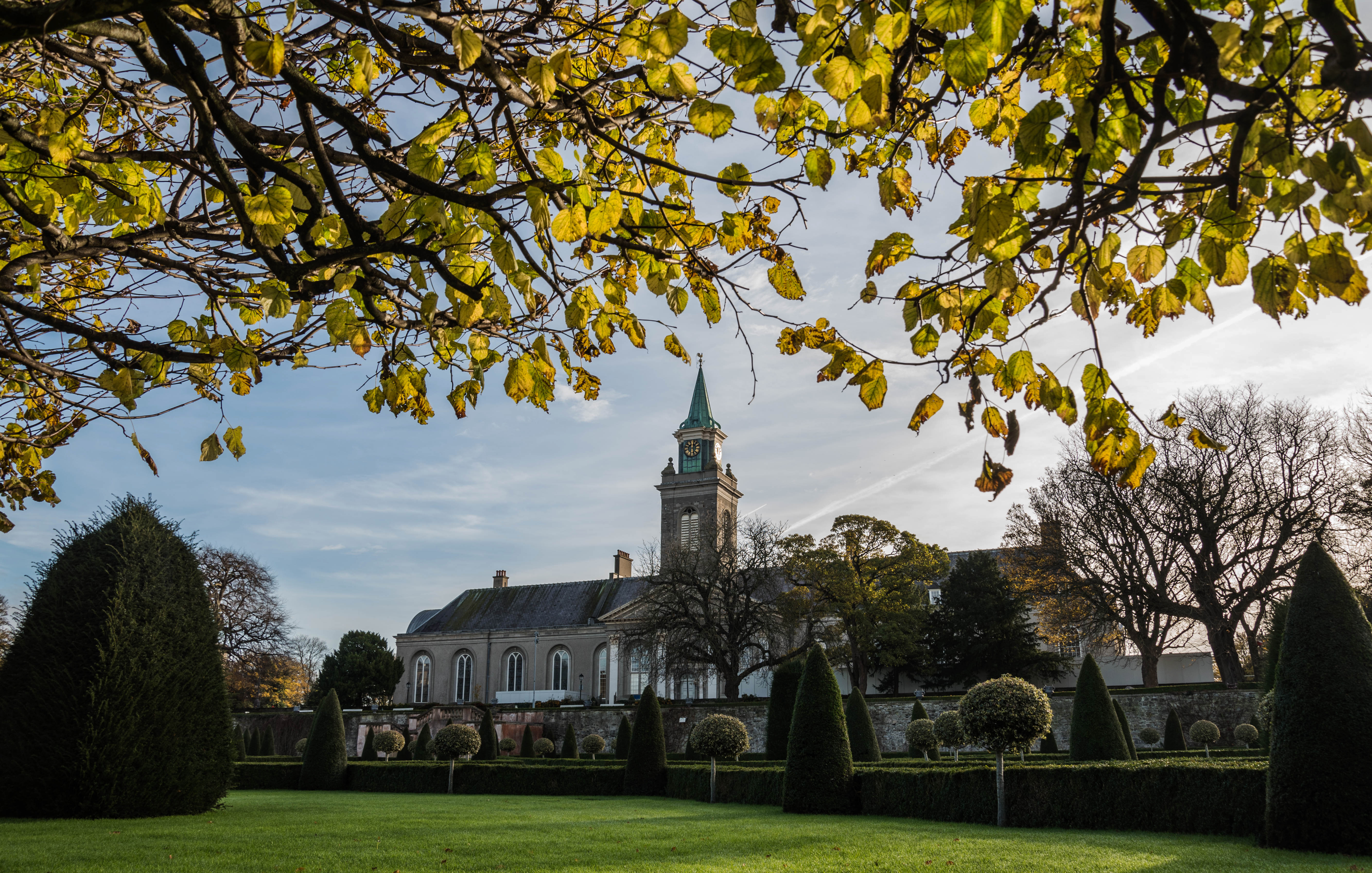
Irish Museum of Modern Art

Public art galleries are found across the city and are free to visit, including the Irish Museum of Modern Art, the National Gallery, the Hugh Lane Municipal Gallery, the Douglas Hyde Gallery, the Project Arts Centre and the exhibition space of the Royal Hibernian Academy. Private galleries in Dublin include Green on Red Gallery, Kerlin Gallery, Kevin Kavanagh Gallery and Mother's Tankstation.

Three branches of the National Museum of Ireland are located in Dublin: Archaeology in Kildare Street, Decorative Arts and History in Collins Barracks and Natural History in Merrion Street. Dublin is home to the National College of Art and Design, which dates from 1746, and Dublin Institute of Design, founded in 1991. Dublinia is a living history attraction showcasing the city's Viking and Medieval history.

Dublin has long had an 'underground' arts scene, with Temple Bar hosting artists in the 1980s and spaces such as the Project Arts Centre serving as hubs for collectives and new exhibitions. The Guardian noted that Dublin's independent and underground arts flourished during the economic recession of c. 2010. Dublin also has many dramatic, musical and operatic companies, including Festival Productions, Lyric Opera Productions, the Pioneers' Musical & Dramatic Society, Rathmines and Rathgar Musical Society, the Glasnevin Musical Society, Third Day Chorale, Second Age Theatre Company, and Irish National Opera.

Dublin was shortlisted to be World Design Capital 2014. Taoiseach Enda Kenny was quoted to say that Dublin "would be an ideal candidate to host the World Design Capital in 2014".

In October 2021, Dublin was shortlisted for the European Commission's 2022 European Capital of Smart Tourism award along with Bordeaux, Copenhagen, Florence, Ljubljana, Palma de Mallorca and Valencia.

=== Entertainment ===
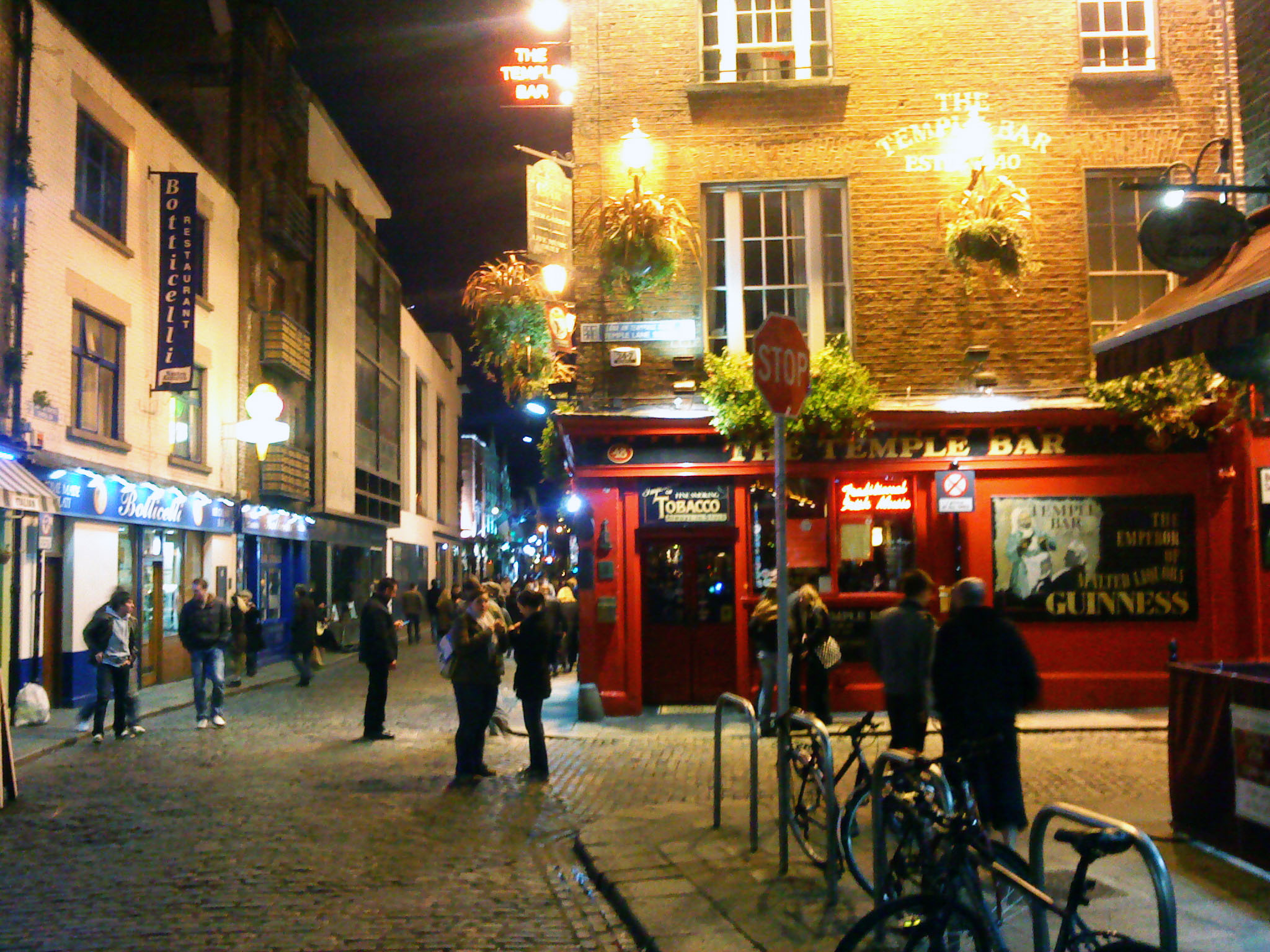
Temple Bar

Dublin has an active nightlife and is reputedly one of Europe's most youthful cities; in 2009 it was estimated that 50% of its citizens were younger than 25. There are many pubs in the area around St. Stephen's Green and Grafton Street, including Harcourt Street, Camden Street, Wexford Street and Leeson Street, the location of many nightclubs and pubs.

A well known area for nightlife is Temple Bar, south of the River Liffey. The area has become popular among tourists, including stag and hen parties from the UK. It was developed as Dublin's cultural quarter and does retain this spirit as a centre for small arts productions, photographic and artists' studios, and in the form of street performers and small music venues; however, it has been criticised as being overpriced and dirty by Lonely Planet.

=== Music ===
Statue of Luke Kelly, member of The Dubliners, on South King Street

Live music is played on streets and at venues throughout Dublin. The city has produced several musicians and groups of international success, including the Dubliners, Thin Lizzy, the Boomtown Rats, U2, the Script, Sinéad O'Connor, Boyzone, Kodaline, Fontaines D.C. and Westlife. Dublin has several mid-range venues that host live music throughout the week, including Whelans and Vicar Street. The 3Arena venue in the Dublin Docklands plays host to visiting global performers.

=== Shopping ===
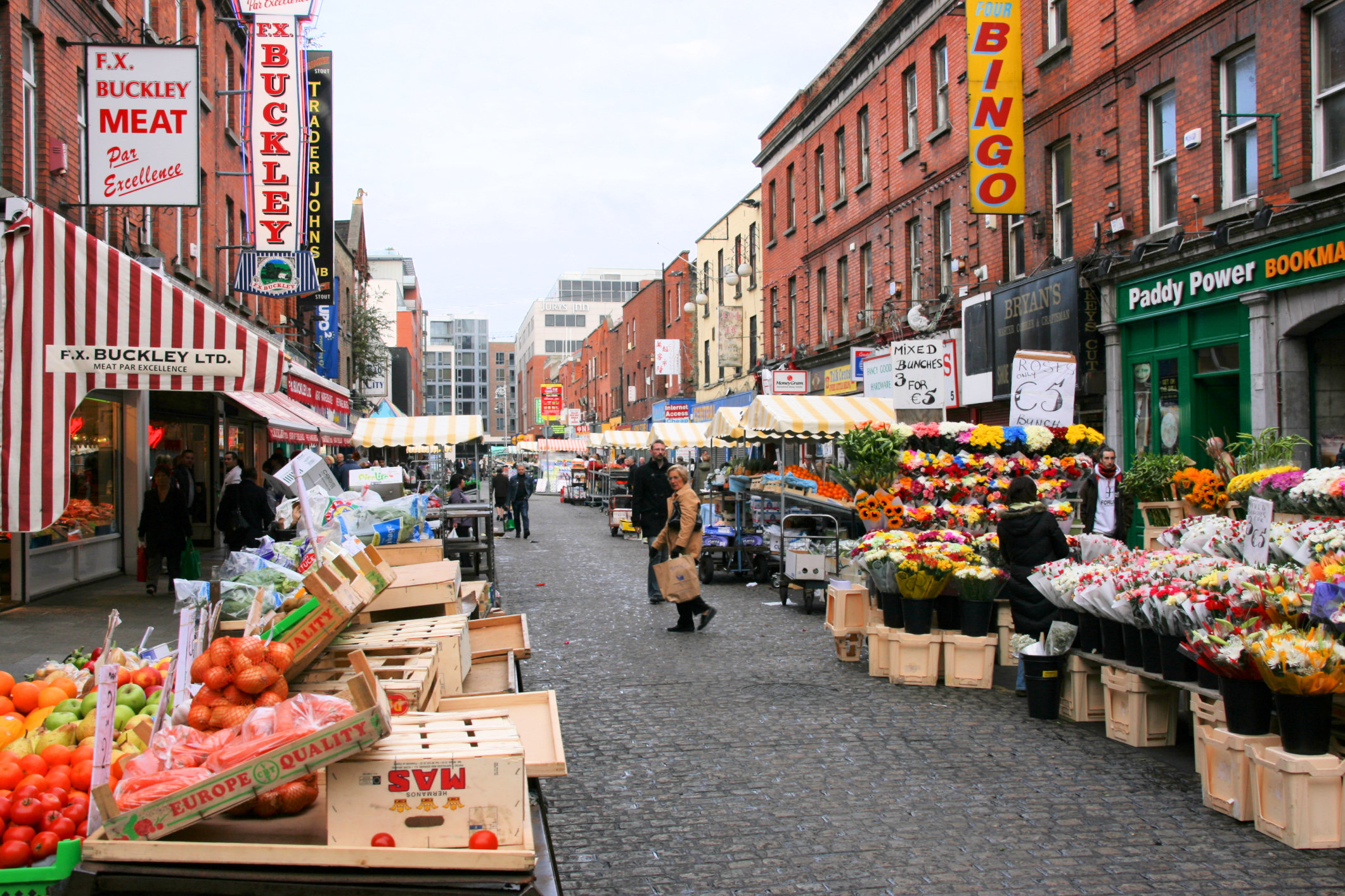
Moore Street Market

Dublin city centre is a popular shopping destination for locals and tourists alike. The city has numerous shopping districts, particularly around Grafton Street and Henry Street. The city centre is also home to large department stores, including Arnotts, Brown Thomas and (before its 2015 closure) Clerys.

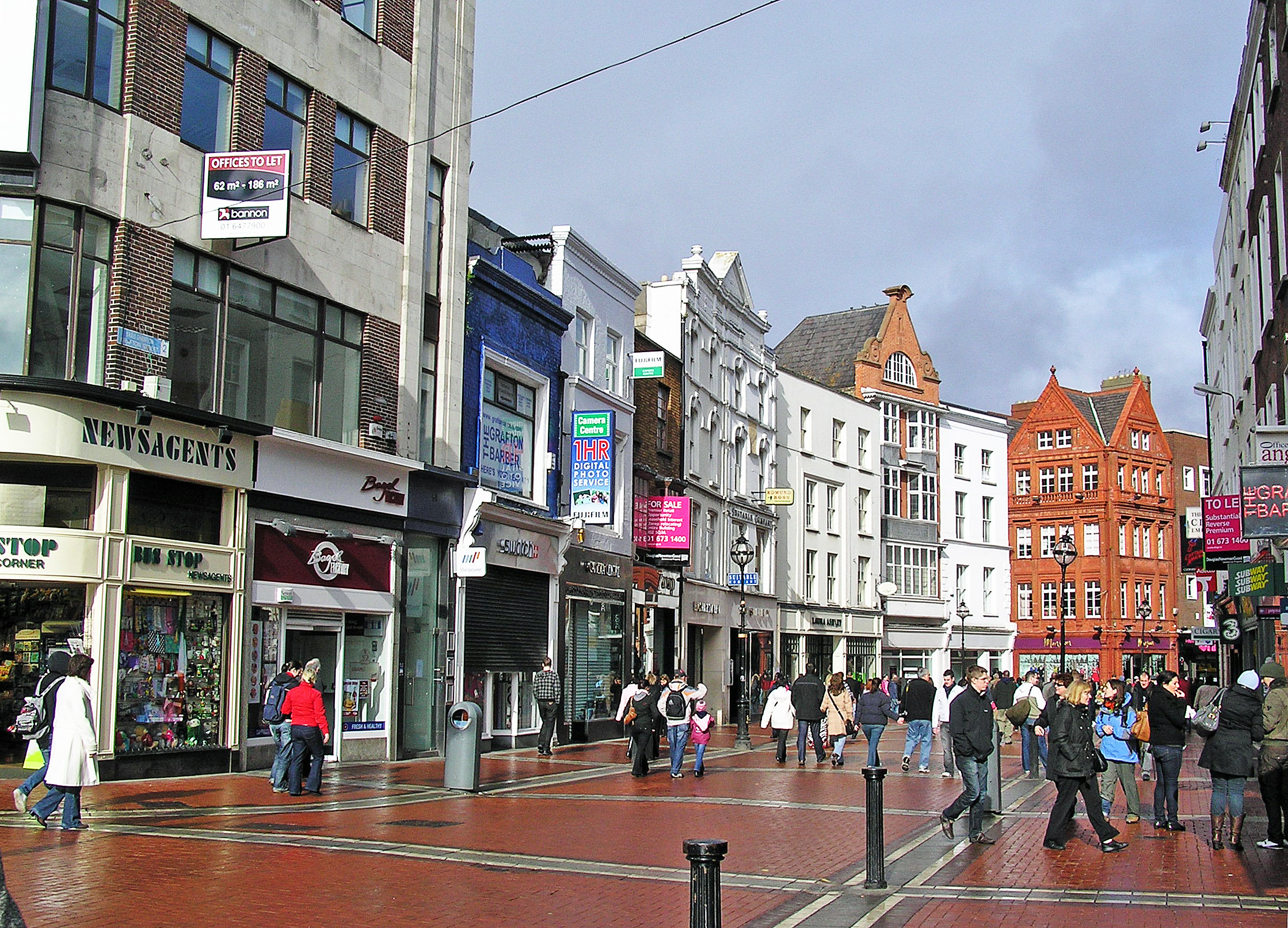
Grafton Street

While the city has lost some traditional market sites, Moore Street remains one of the city's oldest trading districts. There has also been some growth in local farmers' markets and other markets. In 2007, Dublin Food Co-op relocated to a warehouse in The Liberties area, where it is home to market and community events. Suburban Dublin has several modern retail centres, including Dundrum Town Centre, Blanchardstown Centre, the Square in Tallaght, Liffey Valley Shopping Centre in Clondalkin, Omni Shopping Centre in Santry, Nutgrove Shopping Centre in Rathfarnham, Northside Shopping Centre in Coolock and Swords Pavilions in Swords.

=== Media ===
Dublin is the centre of both media and communications in Ireland, with many newspapers, radio stations, television stations, and telephone companies based there. RTÉ is Ireland's national state broadcaster, and is based in Donnybrook. Fair City is RTÉ's soap opera, located in the fictional Dublin suburb of Carraigstown.

Virgin Media Television, eir Sport, MTV Ireland and Sky News are also based in the city. The headquarters of An Post and telecommunications companies such as Eir, as well as mobile operators Vodafone and 3 are all located there. Dublin is also the headquarters of national newspapers such as The Irish Times and Irish Independent, as well as local newspapers such as The Evening Herald.

As well as being home to RTÉ Radio, Dublin also hosts the national radio networks Today FM and Newstalk, as well as local stations. Commercial radio stations based in the city include 4fm (94.9 MHz), Dublin's 98FM (98.1 MHz), Radio Nova 100FM (100.3 MHz), Q102 (102.2 MHz), SPIN 1038 (103.8 MHz), FM104 (104.4 MHz), and Sunshine 106.8 (106.8 MHz). There are also numerous community and special interest stations, including Dublin City FM (103.2 MHz), Dublin South FM (93.9 MHz), Liffey Sound FM (96.4 MHz), Near FM (90.3 MHz), and Raidió Na Life (106.4 MHz).

=== Sport ===
==== GAA ====
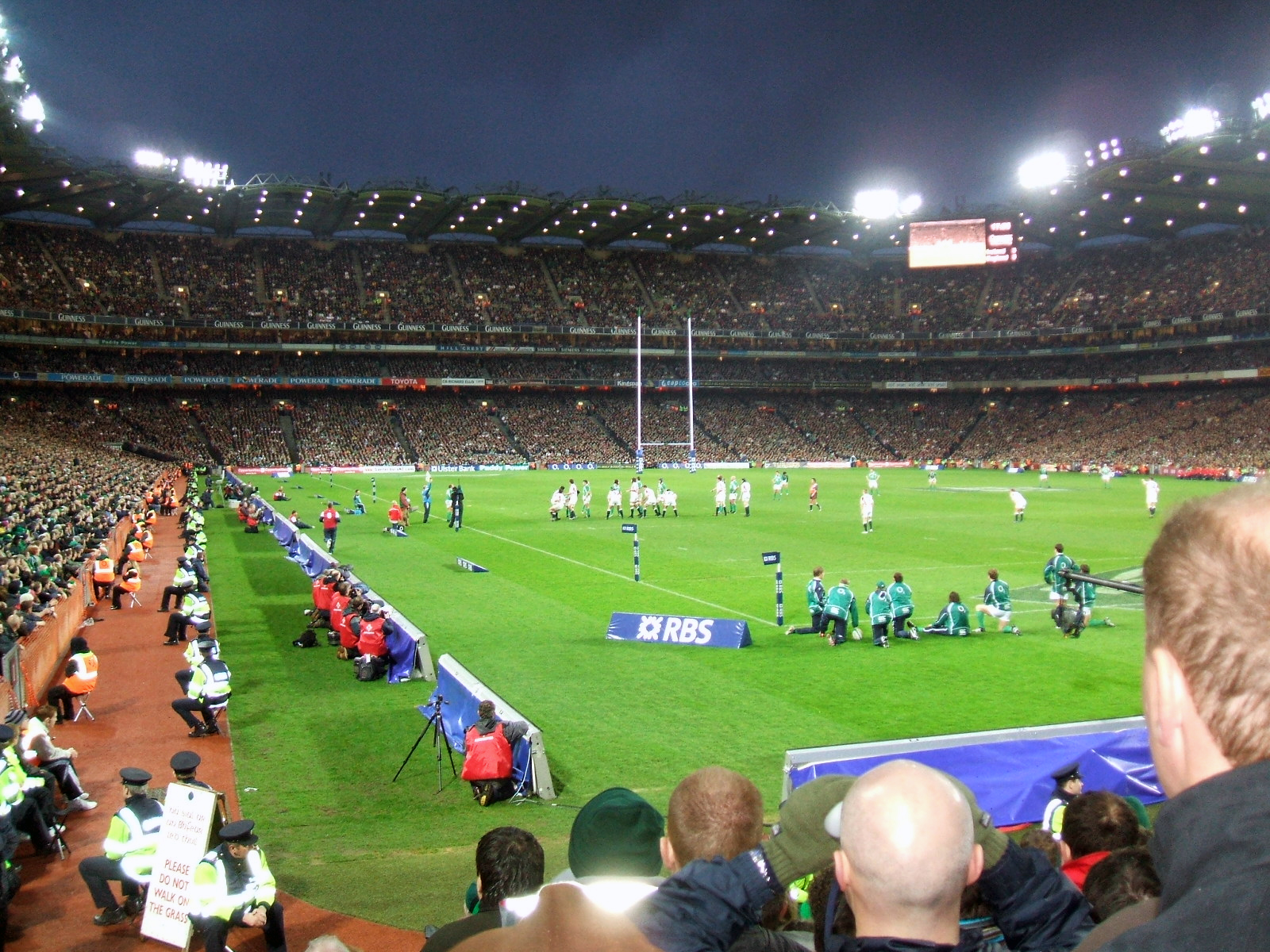
Croke Park

Croke Park is the largest sports stadium in Ireland. The headquarters of the Gaelic Athletic Association has a capacity of 82,300. It is the third-largest stadium in Europe after Nou Camp in Barcelona and Wembley Stadium in London. It hosts the premier Gaelic football and hurling games, international rules football and irregularly other sporting and non-sporting events including concerts. Muhammad Ali fought there in 1972, and it hosted the opening and closing ceremonies of the 2003 Special Olympics. It also has conference and banqueting facilities. There is a GAA Museum there, and tours of the stadium are offered, including a rooftop walk. During the redevelopment of Lansdowne Road, Croke Park played host to the Irish Rugby Union Team and Republic of Ireland national football team as well as hosting the Heineken Cup rugby 2008–09 semi-final between Munster and Leinster, which set a world record attendance for a club rugby match. The Dublin GAA team plays most of their home league hurling games at Parnell Park.

==== Rugby Union ====
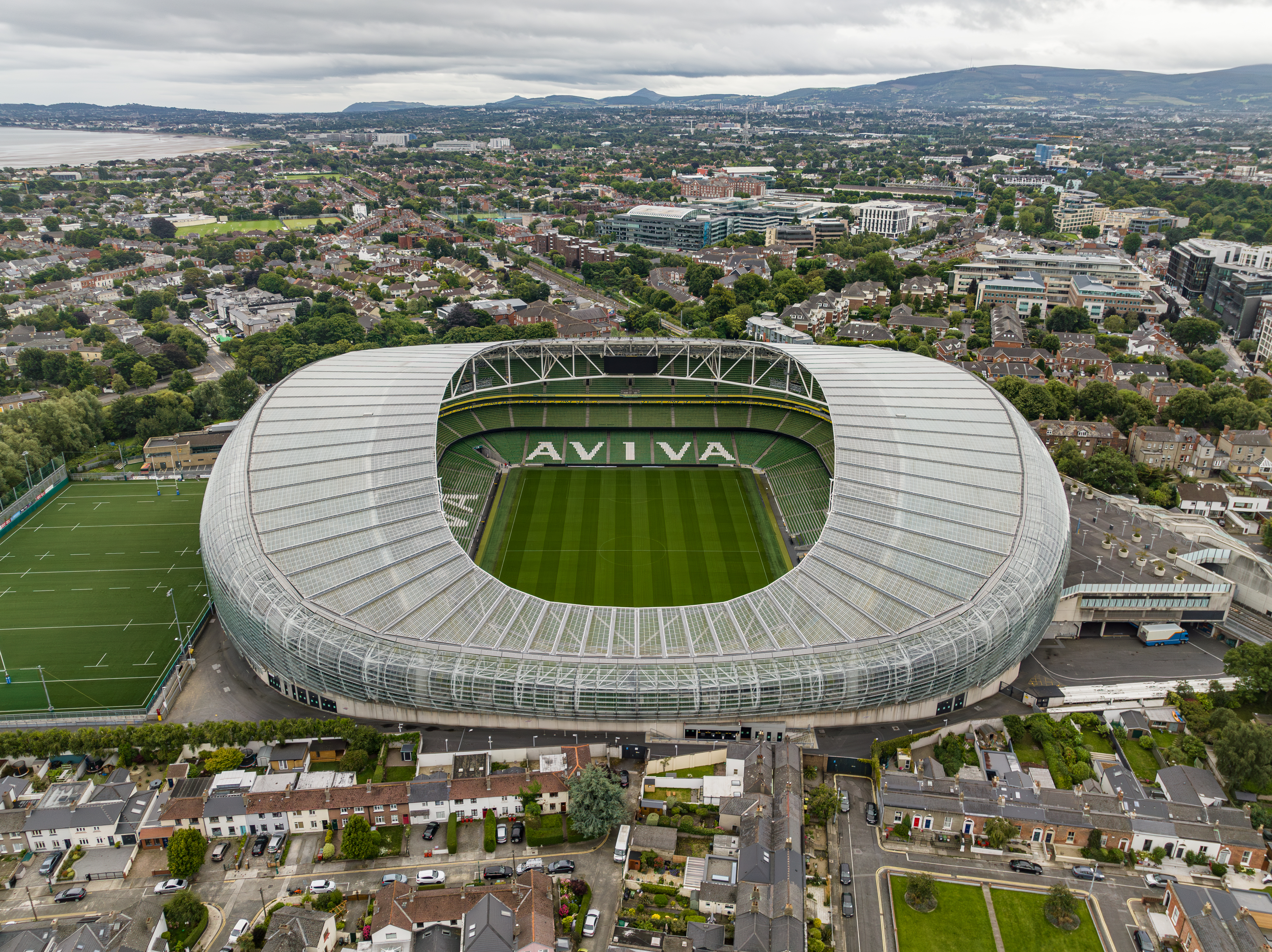
Aviva Stadium

IRFU Stadium Lansdowne Road was laid out in 1874. This was the venue for home games of both the Irish Rugby Union Team and the Republic of Ireland national football team. A joint venture between the Irish Rugby Football Union, the FAI and the Government saw it redeveloped into a new state-of-the-art 50,000-seat Aviva Stadium, which opened in May 2010. Lansdowne Road/Aviva Stadium hosted the Heineken Cup final in 1999, 2003, 2013, and 2023. Rugby union team Leinster Rugby play their competitive home games in the RDS Arena and the Aviva Stadium. At the same time, Donnybrook Stadium hosts its friendlies and A games, Ireland A and Women, Leinster Schools and Youths, and the home club games of All Ireland League clubs Old Wesley and Bective Rangers. County Dublin is home to 13 of the senior rugby union clubs in Ireland, including 5 of the 10 sides in the top division 1A.

==== Association football ====
Dublin is home to five League of Ireland association football clubs: Bohemian, Shamrock Rovers, Shelbourne, St Patrick's Athletic and University College Dublin. The first Irish side to reach the group stages of a European competition (2011–12 UEFA Europa League group stage) is Shamrock Rovers, who play at Tallaght Stadium in South Dublin. Bohemian F.C play at Dalymount Park, the oldest football stadium in the country, and home ground for the Ireland football team from 1904 to the 1970s. St Patrick's Athletic play at Richmond Park; University College Dublin at the UCD Bowl in Dún Laoghaire–Rathdown; and Shelbourne at Tolka Park. Tolka Park, Dalymount Park, UCD Bowl and Tallaght Stadium, along with the Carlisle Grounds in Bray, hosted all Group 3 games in the intermediary round of the 2011 UEFA Regions' Cup. The Aviva Stadium hosted the 2011 UEFA Europa League final and the 2024 UEFA Europa League final.

==== Cricket ====
Dublin has two ODI cricket grounds in Castle Avenue (Clontarf Cricket Club) and Malahide Cricket Club Ground. College Park has Test status and hosted Ireland's first Test cricket match, a women's match against Pakistan in 2000. The men's Irish cricket team also played their first Test match against Pakistan at Malahide Cricket Club Ground during 2018. Leinster Lightning play their home inter-provincial matches in Dublin at College Park.

==== Other ====
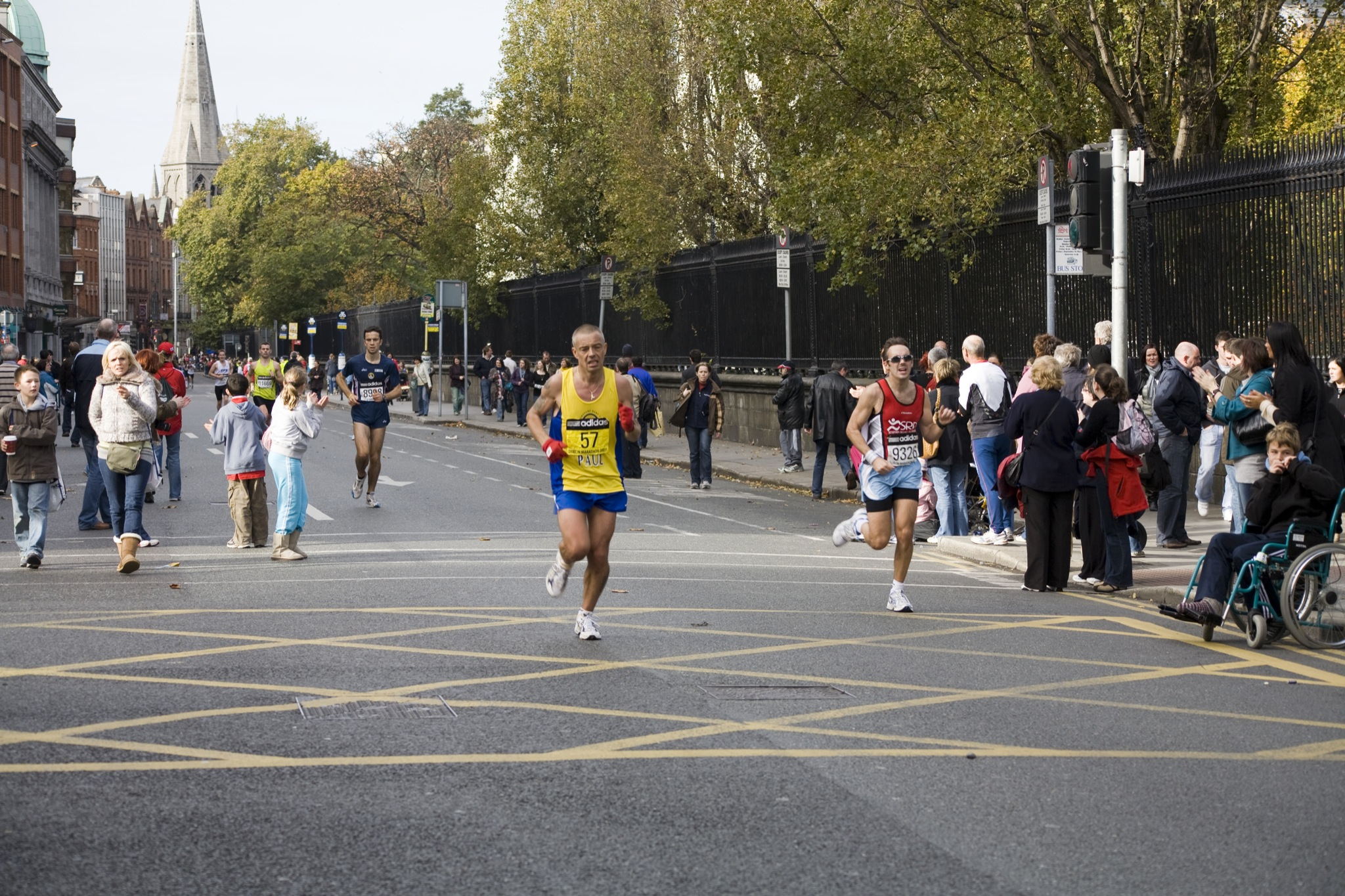
Dublin Marathon

The Dublin Marathon has been held at the end of October since 1980. The Women's Mini Marathon has been run since 1983 on the first Monday in June, which is also a bank holiday in Ireland. It is said to be the largest all-female event of its kind in the world. The Great Ireland Run takes place in Dublin's Phoenix Park in mid-April.

Two Dublin baseball clubs compete in the Irish Baseball League. The Dublin Spartans and the Dublin Bay Hurricanes are both based at The O'Malley Fields at Corkagh Park. The Portmarnock Red Rox, from outside the city, competes in the Baseball Ireland B League.

The Dublin area hosts greyhound racing at Shelbourne Park and horse racing at Leopardstown. The Dublin Horse Show takes place at the RDS, which hosted the Show Jumping World Championships in 1982. The national boxing arena is located in The National Stadium on the South Circular Road. The National Basketball Arena in Tallaght is the home of the Irish basketball team, the venue for the basketball league finals. It has also hosted boxing and wrestling events. The National Aquatic Centre in Blanchardstown is Ireland's largest indoor water leisure facility. There are also Gaelic Handball, hockey and athletics stadia, most notably Morton Stadium in Santry, which held the athletics events of the 2003 Special Olympics.

=== Cuisine ===
As of the 2024 Michelin Guide, seven Dublin restaurants shared ten Michelin stars – including Restaurant Patrick Guilbaud, Liath and Chapter One with two. Irish-born Kevin Thornton was awarded two Michelin stars in 2001 – though his restaurant, Thornton's, closed in 2016. The Dublin Institute of Technology commenced a bachelor's degree in culinary skills in 1999.

Historically, Irish coffee houses and cafes were associated with media professionals. Since the beginning of the 21st century, with the growth of apartment living in the city, Dublin's cafés attracted younger patrons looking for an informal gathering place and an ad hoc office. Cafés became more popular in the city, and Irish-owned coffee chains like Java Republic, Insomnia, and O'Brien's Sandwich Bars now compete internationally. In 2008, Irish barista Stephen Morrissey won the title of World Barista Champion.

Immigrant groups, such as Chinese, Japanese and Italian émigrés, have also opened restaurants around Dublin. A number of South-East Asians immigrated from places such as Hong Kong, Malaysia and Mainland China to Dublin during the 1960s and opened restaurants featuring their cuisines. Modern Irish adaptations of Chinese cuisine include the Spice bag, a takeaway dish consisting mainly of chicken, chips, and vegetables. In 2020, it was voted 'Ireland's Favourite Takeaway Dish' in the Just Eat National Takeaway Awards.

== English and Irish languages ==
Dublin was traditionally a city of two languages, English and Irish, a situation found also in the area around it, the Pale. The Irish of County Dublin represented the easternmost extension of a broad central dialect area that stretched between Leinster and Connacht, but it also had its own local characteristics. It may also have been influenced by the east Ulster dialect of County Meath and County Louth to the north.

In the words of a 16th-century English administrator, William Gerard (1518–1581): "All Englishe, and the most part with delight, even in Dublin, speak Irishe". The Old English historian Richard Stanihurst (1547–1618) wrote as follows: "When their posteritie became not altogither so warie in keeping, as their ancestors were valiant in conquering, the Irish language was free dennized in the English Pale: this canker tooke such deep root, as the bodie that before was whole and sound, was by little and little festered, and in manner wholly putrified".

English authorities during the Cromwellian period recognized that Irish was widely spoken in the city and its surroundings. In 1655, several local dignitaries were ordered to oversee a lecture in Irish to be given in Dublin. In March 1656, a converted Catholic priest, Séamas Corcy, was appointed to preach in Irish at Bride's parish every Sunday, and was also ordered to preach at Drogheda and Athy. In 1657, the English colonists in Dublin presented a petition to the Municipal Council complaining that in Dublin itself "there is Irish commonly and usually spoken".

In early 18th-century Dublin, Irish was the language of a group of poets and scribes led by Seán and Tadhg Ó Neachtain. Scribal activity in Irish persisted in Dublin right through the 18th century. There were still native Irish speakers in County Dublin at the time of the 1851 census.

Though the number of Irish speakers declined throughout Ireland in the 19th century, the end of the century saw a Gaelic revival, centred in Dublin and accompanied by renewed literary activity. This was the harbinger of a steady renewal of urban Irish, though with new characteristics of its own.

=== Current era ===
The native language of most Dubliners today is English, and several local dialects are subsumed under the label Dublin English. Dublin also has many thousands of habitual Irish speakers, with the 2016 census showing that daily speakers (outside the education system) numbered 14,903. They form part of an urban Irish-speaking cohort that is generally better-educated than monoglot English speakers.

Several Irish-medium schools support the Dublin Irish-speaking cohort. There are 12,950 students in the Dublin region attending 34 gaelscoileanna (Irish-language primary schools) and 10 gaelcholáistí (Irish-language secondary schools).

Two Irish language radio stations, Raidió Na Life and RTÉ Raidió na Gaeltachta, have studios in the city, and the online station Raidió Rí-Rá broadcasts from studios in the city. Several Irish language agencies are also located in the capital. Conradh na Gaeilge offers language classes and serves as a meeting place for various groups. The closest Gaeltacht to Dublin is the County Meath Gaeltacht of Ráth Cairn and Baile Ghib which is 55 km (34 mi) away.

== International relations ==
Dublin City Council has an International Relations Unit, established in 2007. It works on hosting international delegations, staff exchanges, international promotion of the city, twinning and partnerships, working with multi-city organisations such as Eurocities, economic partnerships, and advising other Council units.

=== Twin and partner cities ===
Dublin is twinned with five places:

City	Nation	Since
San Jose	United States	1986
Liverpool	United Kingdom	1997
Barcelona	Spain	1998
Beijing	China	2011
Ramallah	Palestine	2023

The city also has "friendship" or "co-operation agreements" with several other cities: Moscow (since 2009) and St Petersburg (since 2010) in Russia and Guadalajara in Mexico (since 2013), and has previously proposed an agreement with Rio de Janeiro also. Previous agreements have included those with Mexico City (2014−2018), Tbilisi in Georgia (2014−2017) and Wuhan in China (2016−2019).

=== Portal project ===
As of 2025, Dublin was one of several cities containing an interactive 'Portal' installation. This series of installations shows a video feed of locations including Dublin, Vilnius in Lithuania, Lublin in Poland, Philadelphia in the United States and Ipswich in United Kingdom.

== See also ==
- Dublin English
- List of people from Dublin
- List of subdivisions of County Dublin
