= List of radio stations in the Republic of Ireland =

Map of regional and local stations in Ireland

This list of radio stations in the Republic of Ireland lists all licensed radio stations broadcast in Ireland, sorted first by legal status, then by area.

The abbreviations MW, FM, DAB+ and DTT indicate the broadcasting bands used by each station.

== Public radio stations ==
=== National analogue and digital radio ===
- RTÉ Radio 1 (87.8–90.2 FM, DTT)
- RTÉ 2FM (90.4–92.2 and 97.0 FM, DTT)
- RTÉ Raidió na Gaeltachta (92.6–94.4 and 102.7 FM, DTT)
- RTÉ lyric fm (95.2, 96.7 and 97.8–99.6 FM, DTT)

=== National digital radio stations ===
- RTÉ Gold (DTT)

== Private radio stations ==
=== Independent national radio ===
- Newstalk (103.3, 105.8–107.9 FM, DAB+)
- Today FM (97.3, 100.0–101.8, 105.5 FM, DAB+)

=== Independent regional radio ===
- Beat 102 103 (102.0–103.1 FM) – Counties Carlow, Kilkenny, Waterford, Wexford and south Tipperary
- iRadio (96.9, 102.1–106.7 FM) – Counties Cavan, Donegal, Galway, Kildare, Leitrim, Longford, Louth, Mayo, Meath, Monaghan, Offaly, Roscommon, Sligo, Westmeath and north-east County Laois
- SPIN South West (94.7, 102.3–103.9 FM) – Counties Clare, Limerick, Kerry, north Tipperary and south-west County Laois

=== Independent multi-city radio ===
- Ireland's Classic Hits Radio (94.6–95.4, 97.2–97.4 and 104.2–104.9 FM) – Counties Clare, Cork, Dublin, Galway, Kildare, Limerick, Meath and Wicklow
- Spirit Radio (87.7, 89.8-94.5 FM, 549 MW and DAB+) – Dublin, Cork, Limerick, Galway and Waterford cities and Athlone, Bray, Carlow, Clonmel, Drogheda, Dundalk, Ennis, Greystones, Kilkenny, Killarney, Letterkenny, Naas, Navan, Sligo, Tralee and Wexford on FM; nationwide on MW

=== Independent local radio ===
==== Dublin ====
- 98FM (97.4 and 98.1 FM)
- FM104 (103.1 and 104.4 FM)
- Dublin’s Q102 (101.5 and 102.2 FM, DAB+)
- Radio Nova (95.7 and 100.1–100.5 FM)
- SPIN 1038 (103.5 and 103.8 FM, DAB+)
- Sunshine 106.8 (106.6 and 106.8 FM)
- Dublin City FM (103.2 FM)

==== Cork ====
- C103 (102.6–103.9 FM)
- Cork's 96FM (95.6–96.8 FM)
- Red FM (104.2–106.1 FM)

==== Connacht ====
- Galway Bay FM (95.8–97.4 FM) – County Galway
- MidWest Radio (95.4–97.2 FM) – County Mayo
- Ocean FM (94.7, 102.5, 103.0 and 105.0 FM) – County Sligo, north County Leitrim and south County Donegal
- Shannonside FM (95.7, 97.2 and 104.1 FM) – County Roscommon, south County Leitrim, and County Longford

==== Leinster (excluding Dublin) ====
- East Coast FM (94.9, 96.2, 99.9, 102.9 and 104.4 FM) – County Wicklow.
- KCLR 96FM (94.6 and 96.0–96.9 FM) – Counties Carlow and Kilkenny.
- Kfm (97.3 and 97.6 FM) – County Kildare.
- LMFM (95.5–96.5 FM) – Counties Louth and Meath.
- Midlands 103 (95.4–96.5 and 102.6–103.5 FM) – Counties Laois, Offaly, Westmeath and south-east County Longford.
- South East Radio (95.6–96.4 FM) – County Wexford.

==== Munster (excluding Cork) ====
- Clare FM (95.2–96.6 FM) – County Clare
- Live 95 (95.0 and 95.3 FM) – County Limerick
- Radio Kerry (96.2–97.6 FM) – County Kerry
- Tipp FM (95.3, 97.1 and 103.3–103.9 FM) – County Tipperary
- WLR FM (94.8–95.5 and 97.5 FM) – County Waterford

==== Ulster ====
- Highland Radio (94.7–95.2 and 102.1–104.7 FM) – north County Donegal
- Northern Sound (94.8, 96.3 and 97.5 FM) – Counties Cavan and Monaghan

=== Community radio ===
- Athlone Community Radio (88.4 FM) – Athlone, County Westmeath
- Claremorris Community Radio (94.6 FM) – Claremorris, County Mayo
- Community Radio Castlebar (102.9 FM) – Castlebar, County Mayo
- Community Radio Kilkenny City (88.7 FM) – Kilkenny city
- Community Radio Youghal (104.0 FM) – Youghal and east County Cork
- Connemara Community Radio (87.8–88.4, 102.2 and 106.1 FM) – west County Galway
- Dublin South FM (93.9 FM) – south County Dublin
- Dundalk FM (97.7 FM) – Dundalk, County Louth
- Liffey Sound FM (96.4 FM) – Lucan, County Dublin
- Near FM (90.3 FM) – north-east Dublin city
- Phoenix FM (92.5 FM) – Dublin 15
- Raidió Corca Baiscinn (92.5, 94.8 and 106.4 FM) – south-west County Clare
- Raidió na Life (106.4 FM) – Dublin city and County Dublin
- Ros FM (94.6 FM) – County Roscommon
- Tipperary Mid-West Radio (104.8 and 106.7 FM) – Tipperary town, Cashel and south County Tipperary
- West Limerick 102 (101.4, 101.6 and 102.2 FM) – west County Limerick
- Yes Radio (Spotify, Discord and 93.7 FM) – Carne County Wexford

=== Community interest radio ===
- Flirt FM (101.3 FM) – National University of Ireland, Galway
- Juice FM (88.7 FM) – Coláiste Stiofáin Naofa, Cork (30 days on FM temporary licence per college year)
- UCC 98.3FM (98.3 FM) – University College Cork
- Wired FM (99.9 FM) – Limerick city

=== Institutional radio ===
- CUH FM (102.0 FM) – Cork University Hospital
- Dreamtime Radio (90.9 FM) – SOS Kilkenny
- Limerick Regional Hospital Radio (94.2 FM) – University Hospital Limerick
- South Tipperary General Hospital Radio (93.7 FM) – South Tipperary General Hospital, Clonmel
- St. Ita's Hospital Radio (89.5 FM) – St Ita's Hospital, Portrane

=== Special interest radio ===
- Dublin City FM (103.2 FM) – Dublin city

=== Religious radio ===
- Life FM (93.1 FM) – Christian radio, Cork city
- Radio Maria Ireland (DTT, DAB+) – Catholic radio
- UCB Ireland (DTT) - United Christian Broadcasters.

=== Digital Radio in Ireland ===
- 8Radio.com (DAB+, internet) – Rock
- GHR (a digital radio service launched by Bauer Media Audio Ireland, on DAB Plus across Lenister on car and home radio sets and online via GoLoud website and also available via the GoLoud App (80/90s music)
- Classic Hits 80s on DAB on car and home / office based radios all over Ireland on DAB. is
- Freeedomfm.ie (80s/90s music)
- Raidió Rí-Rá (DAB+, internet)

Onic 80s - 80s Music Onic 90s - 90s Music Onic Country - Country Music Onic Alternative - Rock and Pop Alt Onic Hits - New Chart Music Onic Pride - LGBTQ Onic Kids - Children's Music Onic Gold - Oldies 50s, 60s and 70s Onic RnB - Classic RnB and Soul Onic Rock - Rock Music Onic Classical - Classical Music and Opera Onic Movies - Soundtracks and Scores

== See also ==
- Radio in the Republic of Ireland
- List of Irish newspapers
- Television in Ireland
