= Radio in the Republic of Ireland =

Licensed radio broadcasting in Ireland is one element of the wider media of Ireland, with 85% of the population listening to a licensed radio broadcasting service on any given day.

== History ==
=== Ireland as a radio pioneer ===
Guglielmo Marconi, the Italian inventor and the father of long-distance radio transmission, had a significant connection to Ireland as a descendent of the influential Jameson family, and the country played a crucial role in his early radio experiments.

The earliest known radio broadcast in Ireland took place on 6 July 1898, when Marconi set up a wireless telegraphy link between Rathlin Island and Ballycastle. This communication system was established on behalf of Lloyd's.

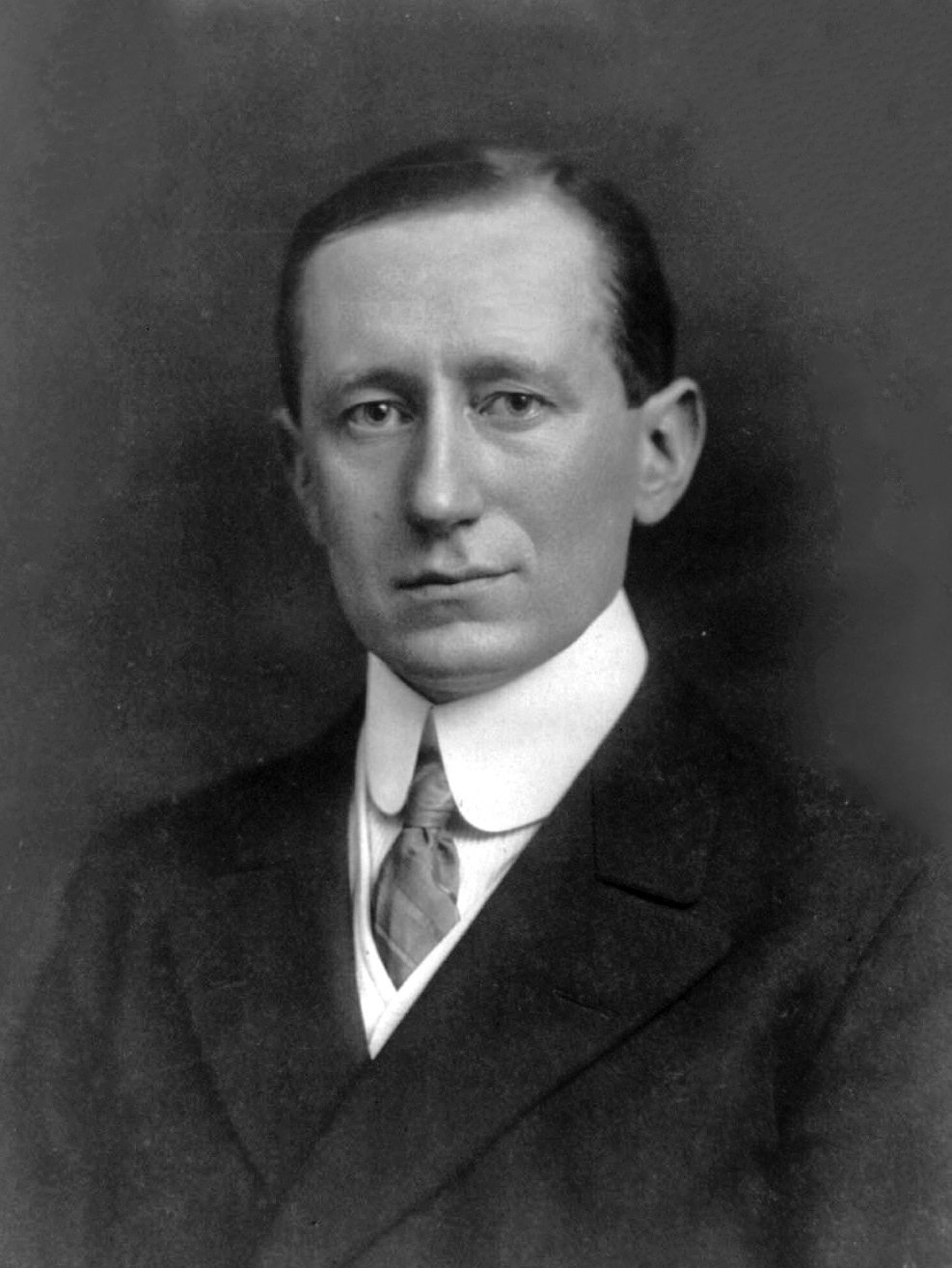
Guglielmo Marconi, often credited as the inventor of radio, conducted many of his early experiments in Ireland

In 1907 Marconi International Marine Communication Company the world's first transatlantic wireless telegraphy service in the world in Clifden. The station conducted the first successful transmission of the first commercial wireless messages across the Atlantic Ocean between Clifden and Glace Bay, Nova Scotia, Canada. The station remained in operation until the late 1920s, when it was closed due to advancements in more powerful transatlantic wireless stations.

=== Modern radio ===
A Morse code transmission on 24 April 1916 from the General Post Office in Dublin by the rebels during the Easter Rising is considered the first broadcast in Ireland. Regular radio broadcasting in Ireland began with 2RN's test transmissions in 1925. 2RN has since become RTÉ Radio 1, which celebrated 90 years of uninterrupted broadcasting in January 2016, making it amongst the oldest continuously operating (if not the actual oldest), continuously public service radio station in Europe. RTÉ Raidió na Gaeltachta launched in 1972, and RTÉ Radio 2, now RTÉ 2FM, launched in 1979.

Commercial radio was outlawed in Ireland until 1989, leading to the development of Irish pirate radio. Upon legalisation, licences were advertised and awarded on a franchise system explained in the article for a national service and a network of regional services covering the country. These all took to the air during 1989 and 1990, and although the national service (Century) eventually failed, all the local services lasted until their licence was revoked, or still exist. Additional licences have been added on an erratic basis since the late 1990s.

An "international" service, Atlantic 252, also operated on 252 kHz long wave between 1989 and 2002, although it was aimed solely at the United Kingdom and Ireland. It was never subject to the authority of the Broadcasting Authority of Ireland (BAI) and was operated under RTÉ's remit as a joint venture between RTÉ and CLT-UFA. After a short period as a sports station (TeamTalk), the frequencies reverted to sole RTÉ control and were used as an additional frequency for RTÉ Radio 1 until transmissions ceased in April 2023, with running costs cited as the reason.

In Ireland, Community Radio has been active since the late 1970s. However, it took until 1994 before the Independent Radio and Television Commission established an 18-month community radio pilot project to explore and evaluate the potential offered by community broadcasting in an Irish context. This project went operational in 1995, when licenses were issued to eleven community and community of interest groups across the country. 2004 saw the establishment of CRAOL the Community Radio Forum of Ireland.

== Licensing ==
Aside from the stations operated by Raidió Teilifís Éireann (RTÉ), radio stations in Ireland operate under sound broadcasting contracts issued by the Coimisiún na Meán. This body replaced the Broadcasting Authority of Ireland (BAI) in 2023 and supervises and regulates RTÉ, commercial Independent National, Regional, and Local Radio stations, as well as the non-profit Community Radio stations, Institutional Services and Temporary Services.

== Transmission ==
All stations broadcast on FM, and RTÉ Radio 1 also broadcast on 252 kHz long wave until April 2023, which was mainly intended for reception outside Ireland. RTÉ radio services are also available free-to-air on digital satellite, as is Newstalk, and a number of recently licensed services or applicants have used satellite transmission to homes as part of the licence applications.

Medium wave (AM) licences were issued for new commercial stations for Limerick and Galway in 2002, although these services never reached the air and were later withdrawn. A medium wave licence was awarded for quasi-national religious service Spirit Radio.

During 2006, a group, Choice FM, applied for and received permission to broadcasting on MW in the Dublin area over a period of thirty days. The "easy listening" radio station relayed its FM programming on 1278 kHz MW and operated opt-out programming at various times. The group is said to be interested in obtaining one of the four MW channels that are allocated to the Dublin area, however the future schedule for licensing does not indicate that any MW licences will be offered on a permanent basis.

During 2007, a radio station called The Rock obtained a temporary classic rock music service. The station broadcast on 94.9 FM and also on 1278 kHz MW. The Rock was operated by the same group that operated Choice FM during 2005 and 2006, although different MW facilities were used by the group during 2007.

== Ownership ==
Raidió Teilifís Éireann and Bauer Media Audio Ireland dominate the national radio broadcasting sector. RTÉ operates Radio 1, 2FM, the Irish Language station RnaG, and classical station Lyric FM. The two national commercial stations are both owned by Bauer Media Audio Ireland - Today FM and Newstalk.

Ownership rules were relaxed in the mid-2000s, which saw several companies buying up local and national commercial stations, including Scottish Radio Holdings, who sold their stations to Emap, who eventually sold on those stations to Denis O'Brien's Communicorp. The ownership of commercial radio in Ireland is largely by two companies; Bauer Media Audio Ireland which owns two national, one regional and two local stations, and News Broadcasting, which owns six local stations.

The rest of the stations, mostly small services, are generally owned by local businesses, with notable proprietors of stakes including Thomas Crosbie Holdings, the Roman Catholic Church and the Mid Western Area Health Board.

Until 31 March 2021, RTÉ also broadcast six DAB stations. These stations are now available via other digital platforms.

Local Radio owners

- Bauer Media Audio Ireland - 98FM, SPIN 1038 and Red FM
- News Broadcasting - FM104, Dublin's Q102, Cork's 96FM, C103, Limerick's Live 95 and LMFM
- Raidió Phobail Chiarraí Teoranta - Radio Kerry, Shannonside FM, Northern Sound FM
- Tindle Radio Group - Midlands 103
- Connacht Tribune - Galway Bay FM

== National stations ==
=== RTÉ (national public service broadcaster) ===
Station	Genre	FM	Saorview DTT	Virgin Media	Sky	Freesat	Internet radio
RTÉ Radio 1	Mixed network - speech and music	88-90 MHz	200		0160		m3u
RTÉ 2FM	Popular music	90-92 MHz	202		0164		m3u
RTÉ Raidió na Gaeltachta	Mixed network in Irish language	93-94 MHz	204		0166		m3u
RTÉ Lyric FM	Classical music	96-99 MHz	203		0165		m3u
RTÉ Gold	Classic hits		208				m3u

=== Independent national radio ===
- Today FM (formerly Radio Ireland) - popular music with some speech programming
- Newstalk - news and talk radio
- Radio Maria Ireland - religious radio on the digital terrestrial platform

=== Multi-city and county radio ===
Broadcasting to Greater Dublin (Dublin city and county; limited parts of County Kildare, County Meath and County Wicklow), Cork city and county, Limerick city and county, Galway city and county and County Clare:

- Classic Hits Radio - music service for over-45s
- Spirit Radio - Christian and religious service aimed at over-15s; launched on 27 January 2011 with FM frequencies in the cities of Dublin, Cork, Limerick, Galway and Waterford. In July 2012 the station as required by its licence introduced its planned AM transmission on 549 kHz medium wave to increase coverage to nationwide.

== Independent regional radio ==
Map of regional and local stations in the Republic of Ireland

- Beat 102-103 - Counties Carlow, Kilkenny, Waterford, Wexford and South Tipperary.
- Spin South West - Counties Kerry, Clare, Limerick, North Tipperary, and south west Laois.
- iRadio (NW) - Counties Galway, Mayo, Longford, Roscommon, Sligo, Leitrim and Donegal.
- iRadio (NE and Midlands) - Counties Kildare, Meath, North Laois, Carlow, Louth, Westmeath, Offaly, Cavan and Monaghan.

All services are licensed for "youth" content, no franchises area geographically overlap, and the entire country is served apart from County Wicklow and the cities and counties of Cork and Dublin, both of which have "youth" licensed services (Red FM and SPIN 1038 respectively). Beat 102-103 was the first to air, and was a pilot for the rest of the system.

In 2011, i102-104 and i105-107 merged to become one iRadio entity.

== Independent local radio ==
There are 25 commercial stations (Independent Local Radio - ILR) licensed on a regional franchise basis. Often several counties of Ireland are covered by one station only, but Dublin and Cork have several. The majority of the ILR stations collectively own the sales house, Independent Radio Sales.

=== Dublin ILRs ===
Except for the two original ILR licenses - 98FM and FM104 - each additional ILR license in Dublin was awarded for a specific format, intending on meeting demands which it was felt that 98FM and FM104 were not catering to. The majority of stations heard in Dublin can also be heard in North East Kildare, South Meath and North Wicklow.

- 98FM - general service
- Radio Nova 100FM (Ireland) - classic rock music service; the Original Radio Nova (Ireland) International, Ireland's first Superpirate station by the same name previously broadcast in Dublin from 1981 - 1988
- Dublin's Q102 - service aimed at older listeners (35+); renamed in 2004, formerly 'Lite FM'. A pirate station by the same name previously broadcast in Dublin from 1985 - 1988
- SPIN 1038 - service aimed at youth (initially licensed for dance music).
- FM104 - general service; formerly 'Rock 104' and 'Capital Radio' 104.4FM
- Sunshine 106.8 - easy listening service; renamed in 2010 - formerly 'Dublin's Country'/'Country Mix'. A Superpirate station called The Red Hot Sound Of Sunshine 101 previously broadcast in Dublin from 1980 - 1988.

=== Cork ILRs ===
- 96FM and C103 (dual franchise) - C103 is aimed at older listeners, also sports and rural interest programmes.
- Red FM - Music-driven service (originally a youth service)

=== Leinster (excluding Dublin) ILRs ===
- East Coast FM - County Wicklow
- KCLR 96FM - Counties Carlow and Kilkenny
- Kfm - County Kildare
- South East Radio - County Wexford
- Midlands 103 and Midlands Gold - Counties Laois, Offaly, and Westmeath (split service)
- LMFM - Counties Meath and Louth

=== Munster (excluding Cork) ILRs ===
- WLR FM - Waterford City & County
- Clare FM - County Clare
- Live 95FM - Limerick City and County
- Tipp FM - County Tipperary
- Radio Kerry - County Kerry

=== Connacht/Ulster ILRs ===
- Galway Bay FM - Galway City and County; commercial radio station
- Ocean FM - County Sligo, North Leitrim, and South Donegal.
- MidWest Radio - County Mayo
- Shannonside FM - Counties Longford, Roscommon, East Galway and South Leitrim. Dual franchise with Northern Sound Radio, covering Counties Cavan and Monaghan.
- Highland Radio - County Donegal.

== Community radio ==
Community Radio covers specific local communities or communities of interest. These operate on a non-commercial basis. In Ireland, the BAI requires that community radio stations subscribe to the World Association of Community Radio Broadcasters (AMARC) Community Radio Charter for Europe. Community radio in Ireland is represented by CRAOL. Currently there are 20 fully licensed community radio stations on air in Ireland, with offers of contracts from the Broadcasting Authority of Ireland, while there are 42 stations in the process of obtaining a licence.

- Belfield FM - University College Dublin
- Cavan Community Radio - Cavan, County Cavan
- Claremorris Community Radio - Claremorris, County Mayo
- Connemara Community Radio - Letterfrack, County Galway
- Cork Campus Radio 98.3 - studio located at University College Cork but is licensed for the general student population of Cork City
- CRC FM (Community Radio Castlebar) - Castlebar, County Mayo
- CRY 104.0FM (Community Radio Youghal) - Youghal, County Cork
- Dublin South FM - County Dublin
- Dundalk FM 97.7 - Dundalk, County Louth
- Flirt FM - University of Galway
- ICR FM (Inishowen Community Radio) - Carndonagh, County Donegal; now known as Inishowen Live.
- LifeFM - County Cork
- Liffey Sound FM - Lucan, Dublin
- Near FM (North East Access Radio) - County Dublin
- Phoenix FM - Blanchardstown, County Dublin
- Radio Corca Baiscinn - Kilkee, County Clare
- Raidió Na Life - Dublin (Irish language station)
- RosFm - County Roscommon
- TCR FM ("Tramore Community Radio") - Tramore, County Waterford
- Tipperary Mid-West Community Radio - County Tipperary
- ULFM - University of Limerick
- West Dublin Access Radio - County Dublin
- West Limerick 102 - County Limerick
- Wired FM - Limerick, County Limerick
- Westport Radio WRFM 98.2 - Westport, County Mayo
- BCRfm Ballina Community radio - Ballina, County Mayo
- Eden 102.5 fm - Edenderry, County Offaly

== Special interest services ==
Special interest services resemble ILRs in most ways, but must be of specialist interest — e.g. heavier local interest content, or specialist music. Only one such station is licensed, Dublin City FM, which brand themselves as 103.2 Dublin City FM on-air, and DUB CITY on RDS. Dublin City FM are essentially a community station with specialist traffic reports around rush-hour periods.

== Institutional services ==
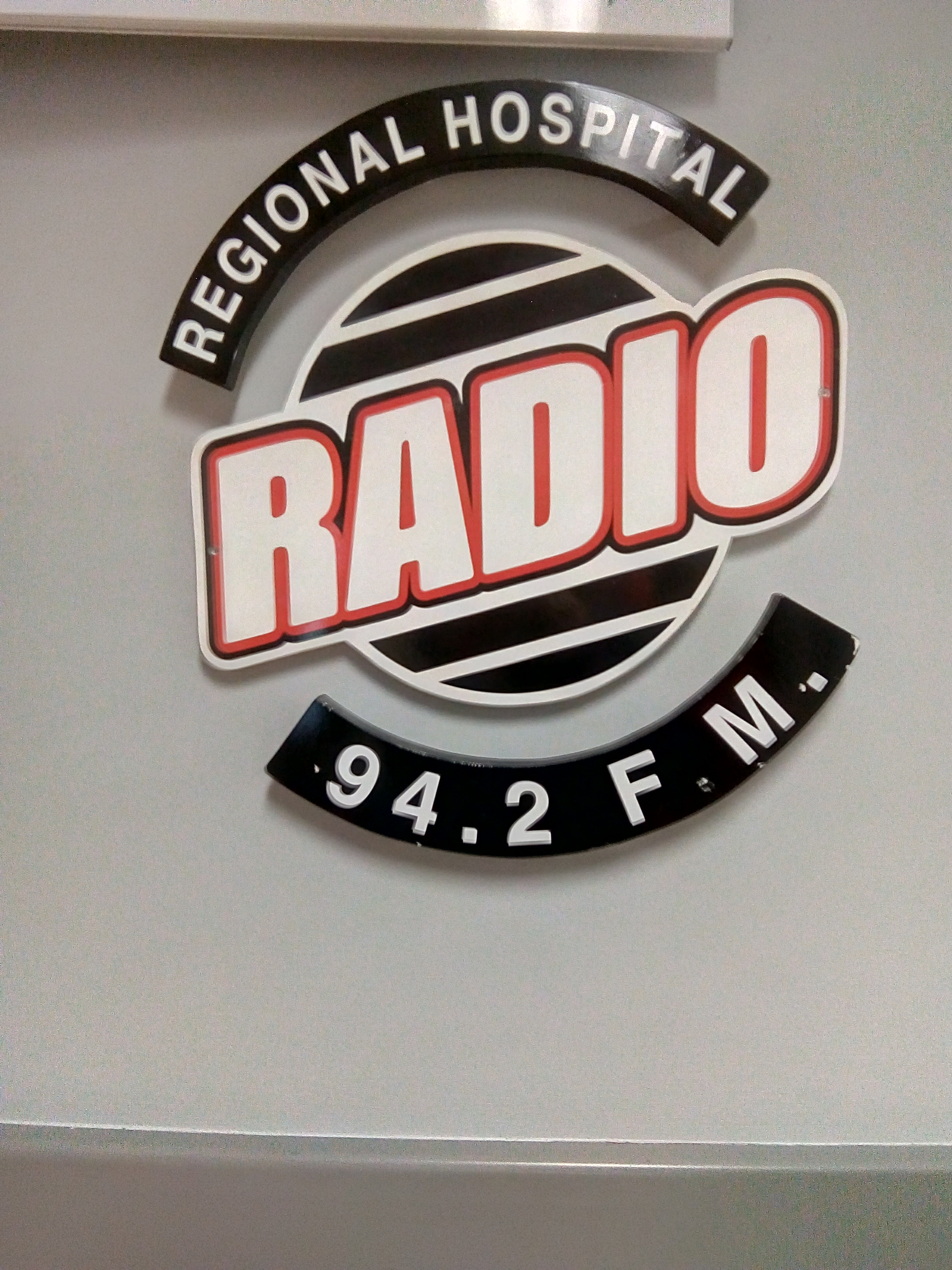
Regional Hospital Radio 94.2 FM

The BAI may also issue licenses to institutions, such as hospitals and colleges, for the provision of low-powered FM services. At present, there are five such stations in operation; all of them are hospital radio stations, with the existing student radio stations operating under community radio or temporary licenses.

- CUH FM Hospital Radio - (102.0FM) - Cork University Hospital, Cork, County Cork.
- Mater Hospital Radio - Mater Hospital, Dublin, County Dublin.
- Dreamtime 92.6FM - S.O.S. Kilkenny Ltd, Callan Road, Kilkenny, Co. Kilkenny.
- South Tipperary General Hospital Radio 93.7FM - South Tipperary General and Maternity Hospital, Clonmel, County Tipperary.
- St. Ita's Hospital Radio - St. Ita's Hospital, Portrane, County Dublin.

== Temporary services ==
Stations may also be licensed to operate for shorter periods, with temporary licenses allowing stations to operate for up to thirty days in a given twelve-month period. These licenses may be used by stations providing a service to coincide with local, cultural and sporting events or festivals. Another group of stations to avail of this type of license are those that are being run as pilot projects. Christmas FM renews their licence every year, as the name suggests it's a Christmas-only radio staition that started in 2008. It was orriginally a Dublin-only staition before it slowly built more transmitters across the country. Its main sponsor is Cadbury, it now broadcasts worldwide through all the main smart speakers and a dedicated website, it's the most listened-to Christmas radio station in the world.

== Defunct stations ==
=== RTÉ radio ===
- Atlantic 252 - a joint venture with RTL, eventually failed financially.
- RTÉ FM3 - Classical music/arts service, had existed prior to the launch of Lyric FM. FM3 time-shared the same national FM network as RnaG, resulting in limited broadcasting hours.
- RTÉ Radio Cork (was originally 'RTÉ Cork Local Radio', changed name in 1989 to 'Cork 89FM', and relaunched again in 1994 as 'RTÉ Radio Cork') - an opt-out of Radio 1 for the Cork area on medium wave and secondary FM transmitters, closed in 1999 due to declining interest.
- RTÉ mobile Community Radio station - existed during the late 1970s and 1980s, this mobile station provided temporary community radio services to towns and cities around the country.
- Millennium 88FM - temporary local radio service for Dublin during 1988 and part of 1989 to mark 1988 at the year of the Dublin Millennium.
- RTÉ Digital Radio Sport - a rolling service in the early days of DAB.
- RTÉ Choice - international and national speech service with drama, documentary, arts, world news. Merged in 2013 with RTÉ Radio 1 Extra.
- RTÉ Radio 1 Extra - closed in 2025
- RTÉ Pulse - closed in 2025
- RTÉ 2XM - closed in 2025
- RTÉjr Radio - closed in 2025
- RTÉ Chill - closed in 2025

=== Independent national radio ===
- Century Radio - failed financially, closed in 1991.

=== Independent local radio ===
- Limerick 95 FM (Radio Limerick One) (95 MHz FM); lost franchise mid-term for stated misbehaviour - subsequently operated on a pirate basis.
- CKR FM and Radio Kilkenny - franchises redrawn at end of contract, Kildare area awarded to KFM, Carlow and Kilkenny to KCLR. Gentrification of Kildare by Dublin commuters led Carlow to be closer aligned with Kilkenny in the eyes of the BAI, hence the changing of the franchise areas
- Tipperary Mid-West Radio - held a very small franchise for South West Tipperary. Its franchise was merged with the rest of Tipperary franchise (held by Tipp FM). The station continues, being re-licensed as a Community Radio station.
- North West Radio - subsidiary of Mid West Radio; replaced by Ocean FM at end of contract.
- Easy 103 - held a licence for part of Wicklow and Horizon Radio held a licence for north Wicklow. These two stations merged to become East Coast FM.
- Fresh 95.5 - short lived North Dublin-targeted station from LMFM; was licensed to Meath only, relying on signal overspill.
- TXFM (formerly Phantom 105.2) - alternative rock music station for the Dublin area.

=== Community radio ===
- Cashel Community Radio - Cashel, County Tipperary was a splinter group from Tipperary Mid-West Radio.
- Tallaght FM - Tallaght, Dublin. Closed 2008.
- 9-7-11 FM - Dublin North West's community radio, (named after the area's postal districts) existed in the mid-1990s.
- Dublin Weekend Radio - station that broadcast from Dublin City University in the 1990s, it time-shared transmission with Raidio na Life. Facilities are now used by DCU.
- Inishowen Community Radio (ICR-FM) - based in north Co. Donegal, ceased broadcasts in October 2012.
- Ballyhoura Community Radio (BCR) - based in Charleville near the Cork/Limerick border. Went on air in May 2011, closed in March 2013. Frequency was 92.6 FM.
- East Limerick Community Radio - FM Frequencies were 96.8 (main) and 97.3.
- CRK FM - broadcast from Kildorrery, County Cork to North East Cork on 97.6fm for 4 years. It ceased in 2018.

=== Institutional services ===
- Beaumont Hospital Radio - Beaumont Hospital, Beamount, Dublin. Closed in 2007.
- Vibe 107.4FM - was a student service in Waterford I.T.
- Regional Hospital Radio 94.2 - Mid-Western Regional Hospital, Limerick, County Limerick. Closed in 2018

=== Radio Oglaigh na h-Éireann ===
Radio Oglaigh na h-Éireann (Irish pronunciation: [ˈɾˠadʲiːoː ˈoːɡl̪ˠiː n̪ˠə ˈheːɾʲən̪ˠ]) was established in 1962 to provide a short wave service to Irish Defence Forces serving in United Nations peacekeeping missions in Congo. Daily broadcasts were made on 17.544 MHz at 17:30 UTC, using a transmitter located at the Curragh Camp. Programmes, which were provided by Radio Éireann, included news, sports results, music and drama, including The Kennedys of Castleross. The service was discontinued after several years, when the Irish peacekeeping mission in Congo terminated.

== See also ==
- Digital Radio in the Republic of Ireland
- List of Irish language radio stations
- List of Irish newspapers
- Television in Ireland
