= List of Irish-language media =

The following is a list of media available in the Irish language.

== Television ==
=== Current channels ===
==== TG4 ====
TG4, originally known as Teilifís na Gaeilge (TnaG), broadcasts on terrestrial television in both the Republic of Ireland and Northern Ireland. It has an annual budget of €34.5 million. The station has an audience of an average of 650,000 people each day in the Republic, a fifty per cent increase on what it was in the 1990s. The station's anchor shows are the long-running soap opera Ros na Rún (160,000 weekly viewership), popular teen drama Aifric, nightly news programme Nuacht TG4 (viewership circa. 8,000), current affairs programme 7 Lá and dubbed documentaries Fíorscéal. Other popular programs include or have included a dating show, Eochair an ghrá, a documentary about the Irish language abroad, Thar Sáile, travel shows such as Amú Amigos (viewership 50,000), Seacht / Seven – a university drama set in Belfast (viewership 40,000), the dating game Paisean Faisean, South Park in Irish, chat show Ardán, talent show Nollaig No. 1, and children's shows Cúla 4 and Síle.

==== Cúla 4 ====
Cúla 4 is a digital channel and carries TG4's strand of children's programmes. Programmes are broadcast Mondays–Sundays from 7 am to 9 am, then from 2:30 pm to 5:30 pm. At the Tourism and Sports post-Budget briefing, Minister Catherine Martin announced Cúla 4 will have its own TV channel launched by TG4. It's scheduled for 2023.

=== RTÉ One ===
Irish public broadcaster RTÉ has one channel, RTÉ One, which broadcasts Irish-language programmes such as news bulletin Nuacht RTÉ le TG4 and new programmes every year such as documentaries of various scandals that rocked Ireland Scannal and community programme Pobal. It was reported on Tuairisc.ie in 2018 that circa. 70,000 viewers watch Nuacht RTÉ every evening on RTÉ One.

=== RTÉ News ===
RTÉ News is a digital 24-hour news service available featuring national and international news. It broadcasts news mostly in the English language but also Nuacht TG4 le RTÉ, the daily Irish language news bulletin on RTÉ ONE television and repeats Nuacht TG4 at 11:30 each night.

=== Houses of the Oireachtas Channel ===
Houses of the Oireachtas Channel or Oireachtas TV is a digital television channel in the Republic of Ireland which broadcasts live from both the Irish houses of parliament Dáil Éireann and Seanad Éireann in Dublin and also broadcasts some Oireachtas committee meetings. It covers parliamentary debates in both official national languages English and Irish although it should be known that the vast bulk of Oireachtas debates take place through English.

=== BBC Two Northern Ireland ===
The Northern Irish variant of BBC Two has its own Irish-language department producing some well-known programmes such as: music programme for young people Imeall Geall, music programme Blas Ceoil, youth drama Teenage Cics, documentary Isteach Chun An Oileáin, cartoon Na Dódaí, interior-decor show Gaisce Gnó and community programme Féile an Phobail. It is funded by the Irish Language Broadcast Fund which has been given £12 million over a five-year period.

== Radio ==
=== Radio stations entirely in Irish ===
There are four radio stations that broadcast entirely in Irish:

==== National ====
- RTÉ Raidió na Gaeltachta (RnaG) – a national radio station which is part of the RTÉ franchise broadcasting throughout the entire island of Ireland with an annual budget of approximately €13 million similar in size to BBC Radio Cymru

==== Youth ====
- Raidió Rí-Rá – Conradh na Gaeilge-run youth-orientated chart music station, currently broadcasting on the internet and in Dublin, Cork, Limerick and Galway on DAB. The station also broadcasts an hour long programme on weekday nights on Raidió na Gaeltachta. They hope to receive a national license to broadcast on FM.

==== Greater Dublin ====
- Raidió Na Life – community and community of interest radio station broadcasting in the Greater Dublin area. The station seeks to get a national license from the Broadcasting Authority of Ireland to be able to broadcast across the Republic of Ireland on FM radio.

==== Greater Belfast ====
- Raidió Fáilte – community and community of interest radio station broadcasting in the Greater Belfast area. The station seeks to get a national license from Ofcom to be able to broadcast across Northern Ireland on FM radio.

=== Online radio stations ===
- Raidió Rí-Rá – Conradh na Gaeilge-run Irish language chart music internet radio station which broadcasts in some areas on DAB. Conradh na Gaeilge hope for the station to receive funding and a national license for the station to broadcast across Ireland on FM.

=== Stations with daily/weekly Irish-language programming ===
Almost all other national, regional and local stations also have at least one (usually weekly) Irish-language programme such as the following radio stations:

Outside Ireland:

- 3ZZZ; Melbourne Community Radio, Australia: Saturday and Sunday
- WFUV; New York City Public Radio Station; Sunday morning

National:

- RTÉ Radio 1 – They broadcast the news in Irish every day.
- RTÉ 2fm – They have a couple of bilingual programmes.
- RTÉ Pulse – The Cosmo Show (bilingual LGBT gay community and scene news)
- RTÉ Junior
- Newstalk Splanc programme on Friday nights

Regional / Community / Third Level:

- BBC Radio Foyle – Foyle area
- Féile FM – Belfast
- BBC Radio Ulster daily Gaeilge show BBC Blas (Radio Ulster) – Northern Ireland
- FM104 – County Dublin
- Near FM – Dublin City North-East
- Wired FM – County Limerick
- Connemara Community Radio – County Galway
- Cork Campus Radio – UCC Cork City
- Flirt FM – County Galway
- Liffey Sound FM – Lucan area Dublin
- ICR FM – County Donegal
- iRadio
- Kfm – County Kildare
- South East Radio – County Wexford
- Midlands 103
- Highland Radio – County Donegal
- Galway Bay FM – County Galway
- Ocean FM – County Sligo
- Mid-West Radio – County Mayo
- Shannonside FM – County Clare
- WLR FM – County Waterford
- Radio Kerry – County Kerry
- Tipp FM – County Tipperary
- Live 95FM – County Limerick
- Clare FM – County Clare
- Belfield FM – UCD Dublin
- Red FM – County Cork
- Phoenix 92.5FM – Dublin 15
- Westport Community Radio – County Mayo
- Radió Corca Baiscinn – County Clare
- Dundalk FM – County Louth
- Iúr FM – County Down

=== Top 40 Oifigiúil na hÉireann and Giotaí ===
A company called Digital Audio Productions specialising in radio programming has created two Top 40 Oifigiúil na hÉireann and Giotaí brands of Irish-language radio programmes.

Top 40 Oifigiúil na hÉireann (Ireland's Official Top 40) is a new phenomenon, and it has become increasingly popular to hear the Irish Top 40 hits being presented entirely in Irish on what are regarded as English-language radio stations such as:

- East Coast FM
- Flirt FM
- Galway Bay FM
- LMFM
- Midwest Radio
- Newstalk
- Red FM
- SPIN 1038
- Spin South West
- Wired FM

== Print ==
=== Newspapers ===
==== Weekly ====
- ga:An Páipéar – weekly national paper published since 2024.
- Seachtain – weekly supplement with the Irish Independent (Wednesdays).

=== Newspapers with Irish-language columns ===
In addition to these, other newspapers which have Irish-language columns include:

- The Irish Times – weekly Irish-language page entitled Tuarascáil published on Mondays and they also publish these articles and other Irish-language articles and some Irish-language news in English on their Treibh Twitter account.
- Irish News – Belfast-based daily newspaper for Northern Ireland; daily Irish-language pages
- Andersonstown News – based in Belfast; Irish-language columns
- Metro Éireann – Irish-language columns
- Irish Daily Star – Irish-language column (Saturdays)
- Irish Echo – Irish-language columns
- Evening Echo – weekly Irish-language segment
- The Connaught Telegraph – Irish-language columns
- The College View – Dublin City University student newspaper; Irish-language columns
- An t-Eagrán – Dublin Institute of Technology student newspaper; Irish-language segment
- An Focal – University of Limerick student newspaper; Irish-language columns
- The Nationalist (Carlow) – Weekly Irish-language segment from Glór Cheatharlach

=== Magazines ===
- An Gael (print and digital) – international literary journal based in the United States (inactive)
- An Gaeilgeoir
- An Lúibín – Australian fortnightly newsletter (language, culture, environment, current affairs); see Irish Language Association of Australia website
- An Músgraigheach – 1943–1945
- An t-Eolaí – science magazine
- An Phoblacht – Sinn Féin magazine- has Irish-language page
- An tUltach – "Ulsterman" magazine- run by the Ulster branch of Conradh na Gaeilge (The Gaelic League).
- Beo – topical monthly online magazine (now available in archived form only)
- Breac
- Càrn
- Celtica
- Comhar – monthly literary and current affairs magazine
- Cumasc
- Éigse
- Feasta – monthly literary and current affairs magazine
- Gaelscoil – education magazine
- Glór Nua - An independent, bilingual magazine celebrating contemporary Irish language and culture.
- Harvard Celtic Colloquium – 1981–1994
- International Congress of Celtic Studies – 1959–1995
- Iris na Gaeilge – magazine from the society Irish Cambridge
- Journal of Celtic Language Learning
- Journal of Celtic Linguistics
- Luimne – Mary Immaculate College magazine, 1999–2000
- Muintir Acla
- Nós – popular monthly youth magazine
- Oghma
- Popnuacht – pop news
- Timire
- Zeitschrift für celtische Philologie – 1987–1997
- Breac – An Chuallacht Ghaelach, UCC

=== Irish-language publishers ===
- An t-Áis Aonad
- Coiscéim*
- Cló Iar-Chonnacht
- Leabhar Breac
- Cois Life Teoranta
- COMHAR under the imprint LeabhairCOMHAR
- An Gúm
- Cló Mhaigh Eo
- Futa Fata
- Móinín
- An tSnáithid Mhór
- Cumann na Scríbheann nGaedhilge
- An Clóchomhar
- Acadamh Ríoga na hÉireann
- An Sagart
- Ollscoil Náisiúnta na hÉireann Má Nuad
- Forsai
- Sáirséal - Ó Marcaigh
- Cumann Seanchas Ard Mhacha
- Sliabh an Fhiolair Teoranta
- Cló Chaisil
- Foilseacháin Ábhair Spioradálta (FÁS)
- Glór na nGael
- Oidhreacht Chorca Dhuibhne
- Púca Press
- Éabhlóid
- Timire

== Irish language online book shops ==
- An Ceathrú Póilí – anceathrupoili.com
- Conradh na Gaeilge – cnagsiopa.com
- Litríocht.ie – litriocht.ie
- Siopa.ie – siopa.ie
- Údar.ie – udar.ie
- An Siopa Gaeilge –

== Multilingual Irish publishers ==
- Cló Mercier
- Dedalus Press
- O'Brien Press
- Arlen House
- Kilmainham Tales Teo.

== Autobiographies ==
- Ainm.ie

== E-Newspapers ==
- Tuairisc.ie (news website)

== E-Magazines ==
- NÓS.ie Young people's contemporary culture and lifestyle online magazine
- RTÉ.ie Gaeilge
- Glór Nua

== Online news channels ==
- TG4 television channel
- Nuacht RTÉ RTE.ie
- Nuacht TG4 TG4.ie
- RTÉ Raidió na Gaeltachta Nuacht Gaeltachta RTE.ie
- MOLSCÉAL TG4
- Meon Eile (Belfast-based news website with videos)
- ExtraG ExtraG.ie

== Social networking ==
- Twitter in Irish
- Facebook in Irish
- Google in Irish
- Gmail in Irish
- European Union Twitter in Irish
- Wordpress Gaeilge
- Tearma.ie Terminology website
- vBulletin version: 3.7.4 Internet forum software package

== Online forums ==
- Boards.ie (Learning Irish forum)
- Boards.ie Teach na nGealt (Irish language forum in Irish)
- Politics.ie (Political Irish-language forum including non-political discussion)
- Daon Phoblacht Chorcaí (Cork-based Irish-language forum)
- Slugger O'Toole (occasionally has articles in Irish)
- Daltaí na Gaeilge (U.S-based Irish language organisation with online discussion forum).

== Dictionaries ==
- Ó Dónaill & De Bhaldraithe (Gaeilge > Béarla Irish to English)
- Pota Focal (ever expanding word and phrase dictionary)
- Duinnín (published in 1924 and still relevant)
- Gogan (30,000 words not published in any other Irish to English dictionary)
- Tearma.ie (terminology dictionary)
- Dictionary of Irish language (Old and Middle Irish to English dictionary)
- Foclóir Nua (collecting and compiling ongoing)

== Place name translator ==
- Logainm.ie
- Sráidainmneacha Bhaile Átha Cliath/Dublin City Street Names

== Encyclopedia ==
- Vicipéid (Wikipedia in Irish)
- Focal.ie- Gateway to electronic resources for the Irish language

== Print to voice ==
- Abair.ie

== Software ==
Lunguashop Com/irish Several computer software products have the option of an Irish-language interface. Prominent examples include KDE, Mozilla Firefox, Mozilla Thunderbird, OpenOffice.org, LibreOffice and various language packs for Microsoft products including Microsoft Office. VBulletin the most popular software for hosting online chat forums has an Irish-language option. The option of using it is available on PeoplesRepublicofCork.com.

=== Video games ===
In 2012 Derry City-based independent developer Black Market Games released Dead Hungry Diner, a fast-paced action-puzzler video game. An Irish-language version of Dead Hungry Diner, in conjunction with Foras na Gaeilge, was subsequently made available for free from Black Market Games' website, with the intent of promoting learning through Irish. This is credited as being the first commercial video game to be released in Irish.

Minecraft has an Irish language option in a game released in 2012 in version 1.3.1.

In 2015 the video game developer John Romero released a remake of the 1980s PC platformer, Dangerous Dave, featuring Irish as one of its languages. Romero currently resides and works in Galway. Another game on which Romero was a key developer – Commander Keen – was used in 2005 by a fan called Benvolio to make a mod entirely in the Irish language: Bunny Basher 2.

In July 2021 Among Us launched the official Irish language translation of the game.

== Mobile technology ==
In 2008 the mobile phone maker Samsung said that it would create a mobile phone specifically for the Irish-language market, which would include Irish-language predictive text. Later that year Samsung announced that all of its new phones launched from 2009 onwards would have "Gael Fón" – a feature allowing Irish as a language option, including predictive text, which was developed by the company – as standard.

Since 2012, Adaptxt, a predictive texting app for Android, also includes Irish as an available language.

== Irish language apps ==
TeachMe! Irish

- Abair leat (Irish language social networking site app)
- Ag Sparoi le Claude
- Aibítear na nAinmhithe agus na nÉan
- An Chraic
- Bábóg Baby
- Cliúsaíocht as Gaeilge
- Cúla 4
- CúlaCaint
- Cúlacaint2
- Enjoy Irish
- Get the Focal
- Greann Gaeilge
- Mo Shiopa Lidl
- Olly an Veain Bheag Bhán

== Gradaim Chumarsáide an Oireachtais ==
Once every year Oireachtas na Gaeilge hold Gradaim Chumarsáide an Oireachtais which are the annual Irish language awards for the Irish language media.

== See also ==
- Irish language
- Official Languages Act 2003
- Gaeltacht
- Gaeltacht Act 2012
- Bailte Seirbhíse Gaeltachta
- Líonraí Gaeilge
- 20-Year Strategy for the Irish Language 2010-2030
- Gaelscoil
- Gaelcholáiste
- Irish language in Northern Ireland
- Gaelic Revival - Irish-language revival
- Irish language outside Ireland
- Scottish Gaelic
- Gaelic broadcasting in Scotland
- List of Celtic-language media
- Irisí agus Nuachtáin Gaeilge
- Féilte Gaeilge
- Foilsitheoirí Gaeilge
- Liosta Gaelscoileanna in Éireann 32
