= Near FM =

Northeast Dublin; Ireland
- Frequency: 90.3 MHz

Programming
- Format: Community

Ownership
- Owner: Near Media Co-op

History
- First air date: 1995

Links
- Website: http://nearfm.ie/

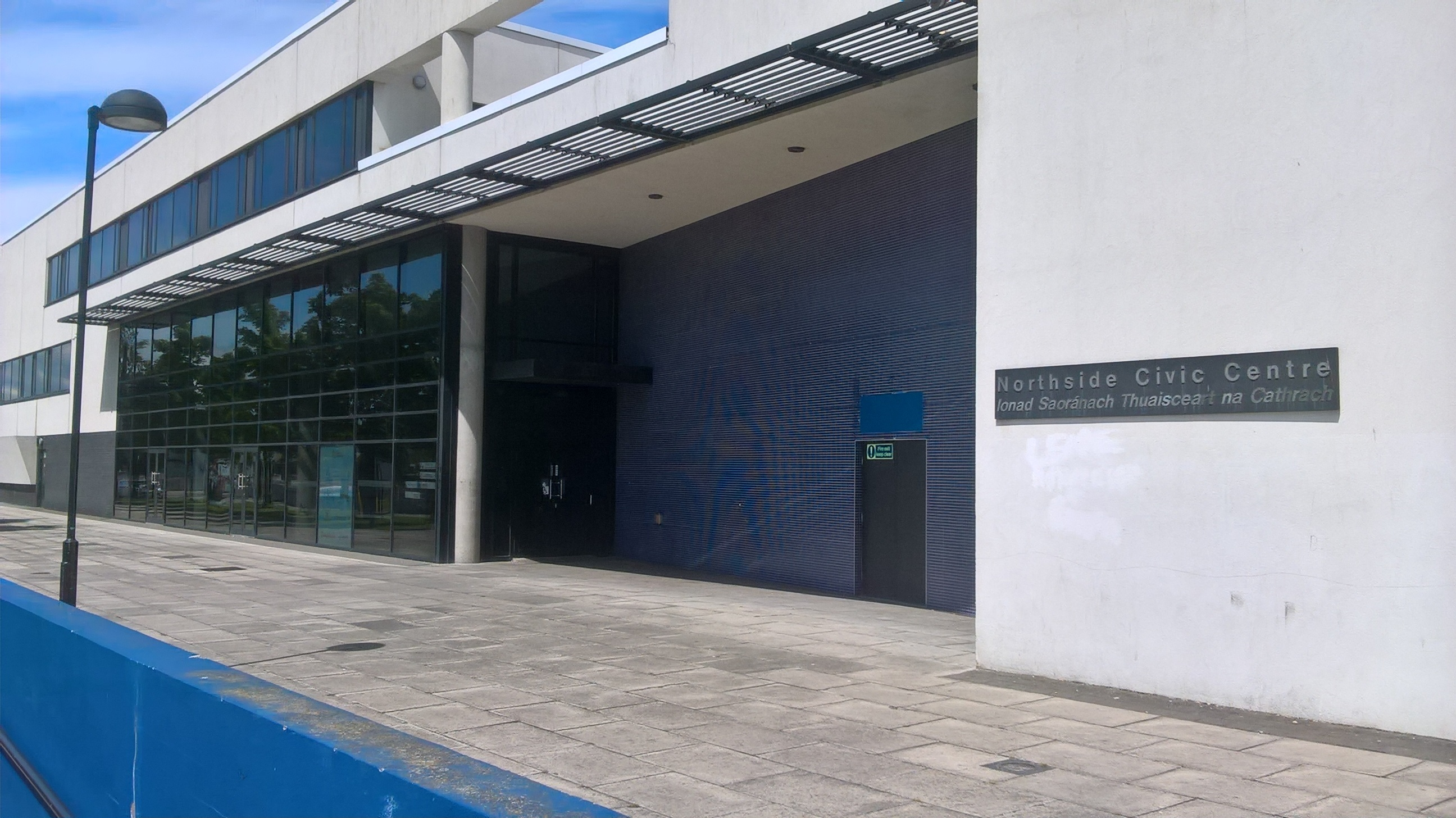
Near FM is based in the Northside Civic Centre

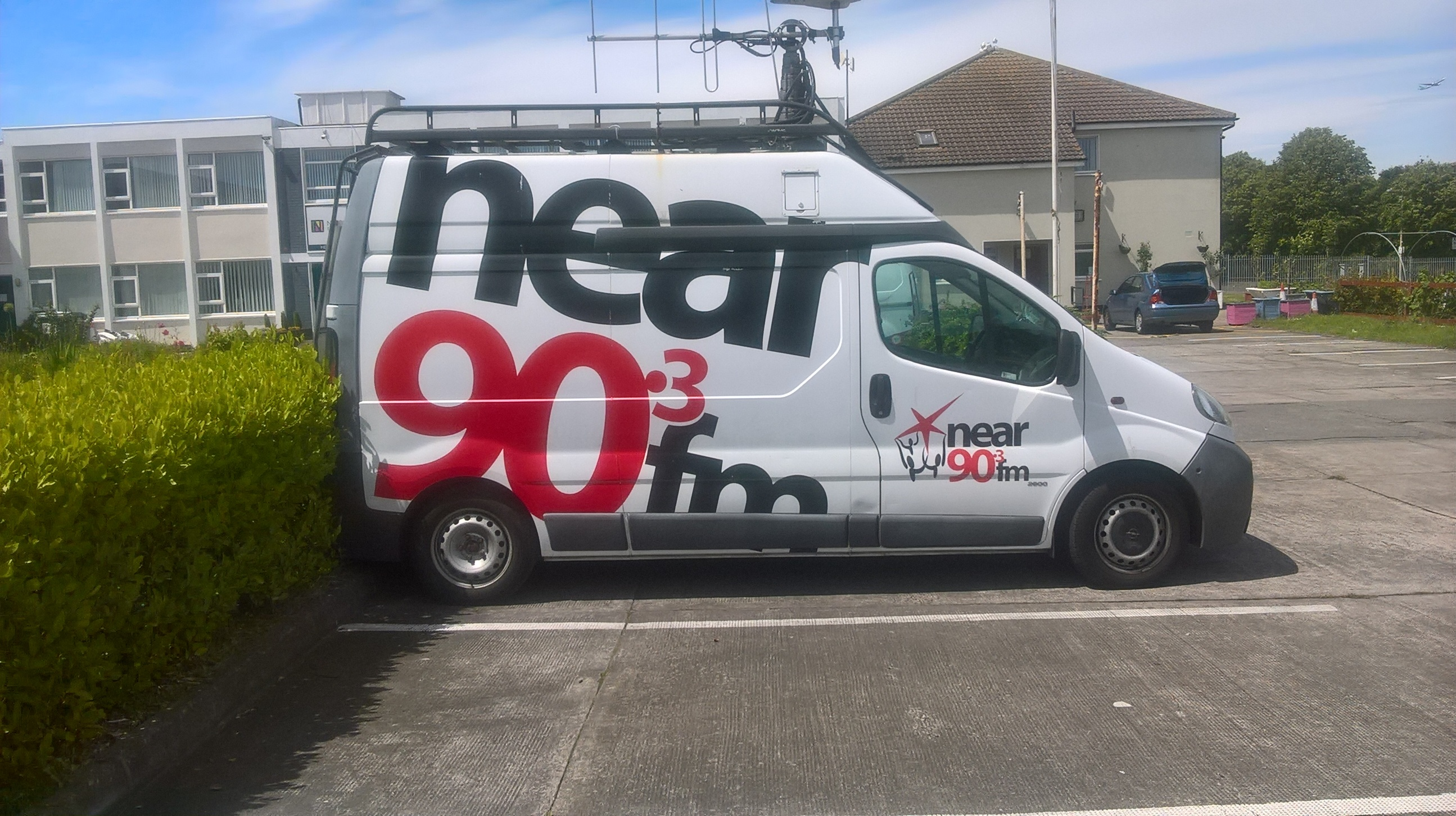
Near FM van

Near FM (North East Access Radio) 90.3 FM is a BAI-licensed community media project operated by the not-for-profit media co-operative, Near Media Co-operative Society Limited.

Membership in the co-operative is open to all organisations and individuals in Dublin North-East, Ireland.

The station provides a wide range of specialist music programmes (blues, punk, ska etc.) as well as a variety of talk programming.

Previously known as Near FM 101.6, the station first went on air in August 1995. On Tuesday 23 January 2007, the station switched to a new frequency of 90.3 MHz and was renamed Near90fm. In 2012, the station reverted to using its former Near FM name.

Near Media Co-op also runs other community television projects – Near TV Productions, NearCast and Near Drama as well as other projects including Near Records and Near Choice.

Near FM is a founding member of CRAOL, The Community Radio Forum of Ireland.

In the 1980s there was a pirate radio station which NEAR FM is based on called North Dublin Community Radio, which broadcast on 100 MHz FM, and 1008 kHz AM. It closed down in 1988, in order that the legal co-op could apply for a community radio licence.

== Franchise area ==
Dublin North-East to include Coolock including Bonnybrook, Ayrfield and Kilmore West, Artane, Donnycarney, Killester, Kilbarrack, Raheny, Beaumont, Baldoyle, Dollymount, Donaghmede, Darndale, East Wall, Ballybough, Ballymun, Drumcondra, Fairview, Whitehall, Santry and Glasnevin.

== Broadcasting hours ==
- 24 hours a day

== See also ==
- Coolock
- Phoenix 92.5FM
- Dublin South FM
- Liffey Sound FM
- Raidió na Life
- CRAOL
- Coimisiún na Meán
