= CRAOL =

Support group for Irish Community Radio

CRAOL ([kɾˠiːlˠ] or [kɾˠeːlˠ], Irish: "announce, broadcast"), also called the Community Radio Forum of Ireland, or Community Radio Ireland, is the representative, co-ordinating, lobbying, training and support group for Irish Community Radio. Every week, across Ireland, 2000 community radio volunteers broadcasts to 170,000 people in 20 fully licensed stations and 42 aspirant stations. The organisation runs a helpline to assist in the development of community radio. CRAOL is a registered provider of FETAC Accredited training.

CRAOL receives funding from the Broadcasting Authority of Ireland and the support organization The Wheel.

== History ==
In 1994 the Independent Radio and Television Commission (IRTC) established an 18-month community radio pilot project to explore and evaluate the potential offered by community broadcasting in Ireland. Licenses were issued in 1995 to eleven community and community of interest groups across the country. The IRTC implemented, during the pilot project period, the Community Radio Forum, now called now CRAOL.

The Community Radio Forum was set up to provide inter-station communication and information exchange. CRAOL produced a report in 1997 on the outcomes of the pilot project, called "A Community Radio Model for Ireland", which was a key information sources for the IRTC's final evaluation report. The Broadcasting Commission of Ireland, now the Broadcasting Authority of Ireland (BAI), has supported expansion of the sector and a deepening and broadening of CRAOL's activities. CRAOL was formally incorporated as a Registered Society (co-operative) with a constitution and standing orders and rules in 2004.

CRAOL is a co-operative whose shareholders are the fully licensed community radio stations. Those stations which do not yet have full licences can join as "associate members". Each full member station nominates a CRAOL representative and these representatives meet twice a year in "forum". From these twenty representatives, nine form the organisation's governing body, the co-ordinating committee, which takes place at the Annual General Meeting. One third of the co-ordinating committee rotate every year.

In July 2010, CRAOL hosted a community radio conference in Croke Park, Dublin with the opening address given by Steve Buckley, president of World Association of Community Radio Broadcasters.

== Stations represented by CRAOL ==
- Athlone Community Radio - Athlone, County Westmeath.
- Claremorris Community Radio - Claremorris, County Mayo.
- Connemara Community Radio - Letterfrack, County Galway
- Cork Campus Radio - based at University College Cork and licensed for the general student population of Cork City
- CRC FM - Community Radio Castlebar - Castlebar, County Mayo
- CRY 104.0FM - Community Radio Youghal - Youghal, East Cork
- Dublin South FM - South Dublin
- Dundalk FM 100 - Dundalk, County Louth
- Flirt FM - Galway (community of interest, students)
- ICR FM Inishowen Community Radio - Carndonagh, County Donegal
- Life FM - County Cork
- Liffey Sound FM - Lucan, Dublin
- Near FM - North East Access Radio - North Dublin
- Phoenix FM - Blanchardstown, Dublin
- Raidió Corca Baiscinn - Kilkee, Kilrush and rural south west Clare, County Clare
- Raidió na Life - Dublin (in the Irish language)
- Raidió Fáilte - Belfast (in the Irish language)
- RosFm - County Roscommon
- Tallaght FM - Tallaght, Dublin
- Tipperary Mid-West Community Radio - County Tipperary
- West Dublin Access Radio - West Dublin
- West Limerick 102 - County Limerick
- Wired FM - Limerick City

== Awards ==
CRAOL runs an annual awards ceremony for achievements in the sector. Categories have included:

- Commissioned Programme
- Community and Volunteer Participation
- Social Benefit
- Music Programming
- Resilience and Innovation
- Volunteer Team
- Technical Production values

== See also ==
- Alliance of Community Radio Austria
- Community Media Association (UK)
- Alliance for Community Media (US)
- World Association of Community Radio Broadcasters (Worldwide)
