= Phoenix 92.5FM =

92.5 Phoenix FM
Blanchardstown; Ireland
- Frequency: 92.5 MHz

Programming
- Format: Varied
- Affiliations: CRAOL

Ownership
- Owner: Dublin 15 Community Broadcasting Cooperative Society

History
- Founded: 1989
- First air date: January 2000

Technical information
- Licensing authority: Broadcasting Authority of Ireland

Links
- Website: https://www.phoenixfm.ie/

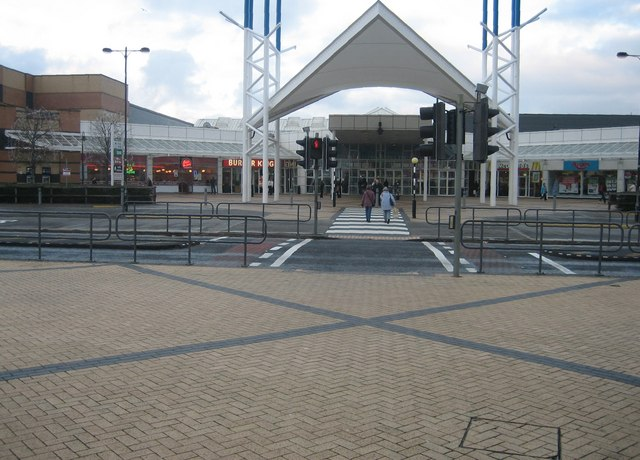
Phoenix FM is based in the Blanchardstown Shopping Centre

92.5 Phoenix FM (or Phoenix FM) is a community radio station that is licensed to broadcast in Dublin 15, Ireland. The "Dublin 15 Community Broadcasting Cooperative Society" was established in 1989. Phoenix FM received a licence to broadcast in 1999 from the Broadcasting Authority of Ireland and began broadcasting in 2000 from Blanchardstown Shopping Centre.

== See also ==
- Blanchardstown
- CRAOL
- List of radio stations in the Republic of Ireland
- Coimisiún na Meán
