= Newstalk =

Irish radio station

- Logo used since 2023
- Ireland
- Frequencies: FM: 106–108 MHz; DAB+: FáilteDAB; Virgin Media Ireland: 932

Programming
- Format: News/talk

Ownership
- Owner: Bauer Media Audio Ireland
- Sister stations: Today FM; Dublin's 98FM; Spin 1038; Spin South West; Cork's Red FM; iRadio

History
- First air date: 9 April 2002 (as NewsTalk 106); 29 September 2006 (as national station)
- Former names: NewsTalk 106

Links
- Website: www.newstalk.com

Newstalk (formerly NewsTalk 106) is a national independent radio station in Ireland. It is operated by News 106 Limited, a subsidiary of Bauer Media Audio Ireland, and broadcasts under a sound broadcasting contract with Coimisiún na Meán.

Newstalk is Ireland's only commercial all-talk station, broadcasting opinion, analysis, entertainment and sport.

== Weekday Format ==
The station is the only commercial radio station in Ireland to take on an exclusively news and current affairs based format. News is broadcast every hour. The station's flagship morning programme is Newstalk Breakfast ( after Breakfast Briefing with Shane Beatting at 6:00AM and Breakfast Briefing presented by Joe Lynam at 6:30AM) presented Anton Savage ( starting at 7:00AM) with Joe Lynham presenting business coverage. Following on from Newstalk Breakfast is The Claire Byrne Show, presented by Claire Byrne. The show mixes current affairs analysis, human interest interviews with light entertainment stories and live music. From midday, Andrea Gilligan presents Lunchtime Live, where she invites callers to have their say on the topics of the day. Seán Moncrieff broadcasts from 2pm with The Moncrieff Show, covering politics, history, popular culture and many other topics. Newstalk's drive time show, is The Hard Shoulder. It's on every weekday afternoon from 4–7pm presented by Ciara Kelly & Shane Coleman and is a round-up of the day's events and interviews with the people at the centre of the stories. Off The Ball is on at 7pm and covers Irish sport and stories to the Newstalk audience with in depth analysis and debate.

From 10:00PM -12:00 AM Monday -Thursday The Tom Dunne is on air after Off The Ball with Splanc, Newstalk’s weekly Irish language show presented by Cũan O’ Flaharta on Fridays after Off The Ball.

== Audience share ==
On 5 November 2020, Newstalk announced it had recorded an all-time high weekly reach of 804,000 listeners, up 62,000 on the same time the previous year. The station's listened yesterday figure is an all-time high of 426,000 listeners, up 13,000 on 2019. Newstalk has a prime-time Market Share figure of 7.8%.

== History ==
In 1999 the Broadcasting Commission of Ireland (BCI) invited applications for a number of new Dublin radio services, expanding on the then duopoly of 98FM and FM104. One was for a speech-based radio service. The Independent Local Radio (ILR) national news provider Independent Network News, was one of two applicants for this licence, and its applicant company, News 106, was awarded the franchise. However, before the station even went on air, several ILR companies decided that they did not want to be part of the venture, and the station's shareholding was restructured, with at launch, 98FM, FM104, Clare FM, Carlow Kildare Radio, LMFM, East Coast Radio, South East Radio and WLR FM, along with Setanta, being the shareholders in the company.

The station first went on air (under its original name NewsTalk 106) on 9 April 2002, with David McWilliams the first presenter. In its original format, it offered Twenty-Twenty News, every twenty minutes. The first 20/20 news bulletins were presented by several newsreaders including Eimear Lowe, James Healy, Dyane Connor, Dimitri O'Donnell, Sean Archibald and Abigail Reilly. In September 2004 the news service was reduced to every thirty minutes ("News 30") along with a revamped news team to replace the original journalists who had left the station by this stage. In Summer 2004, the station signed Eamon Dunphy, dropping David McWilliams, resulting in controversy. In 2004, FM104 was forced to sell its stake as a condition of its takeover by Scottish Radio Holdings. This meant that Communicorp was able to take majority control of the station. Setanta and Hyper Trust remained as minority shareholders.

In 2005, Elaine Geraghty, the original co-presenter of the breakfast time programme on 98FM, was appointed Chief Executive. On 22 May 2006, the Broadcasting Commission of Ireland (BCI), nowadays Broadcasting Authority of Ireland (BAI) announced that its new quasi-national speech-based contract was being awarded to Newstalk, who retained their 106 MHz frequency in Dublin while surrendering its Dublin ILR licence. Newstalk were the sole application for the licence. It began quasi-national broadcasts on 29 September 2006. The media expressed concern at its relative lack of star names and proliferation of unknowns, though noted the presence of George Hook and Seán Moncrieff.

In 2009, Ms Geraghty resigned as CEO and Frank Cronin, Setanta's board representative since 2002, was appointed CEO. Schedule changes included the appointment of former Minister for Agriculture Ivan Yates as breakfast presenter, Damien Kiberd to Lunchtime presenter and the re-engagement of Eamon Dunphy to Sunday Newspaper review programme presenter. This schedule together with the continuity of George Hook, Off the Ball, Sean Moncrieff and Tom Dunne has driven the station to new heights of daily listenership and standing. The station now reaches 305,000 (JNLR February 2012) people daily, the fastest growing adult station in Ireland.

The rugby pundit, George Hook who presented the daily drive time show Right Hook, retired in 2014, he returned to present High Noon. He was suspended in September 2017 following comments he made on rape.

In 2021, Newstalk rebranded its Station Imaging with new Voiceover Mark Cagney. In February 2026 it was rebranded again with new voiceover artists voices doing the station branding taking over from Mark Cagney.

Following the launch of FáilteDAB in 2025, Newstalk began broadcasting on DAB+ throughout Dublin and the wider Leinster area.

== Newstalk News Network ==
Newstalk is primarily known as a radio station; however, it is also the provider of the only national radio newswire in Ireland. Newstalk provides 'rip and read' copy and audio 24/7, and also provides a live stream of audio news reading every hour. The latter is used mostly by local radio stations after 7 p.m daily across Ireland and sometimes on weekends and very regularly on Bank Holidays is very regularly used.
