= Simon Palmer =

DJ from Cumbria, England

Simon Palmer is an English DJ from Cumbria, England. He presents the radio show Back2Basics, which airs on RTÉ Pulse. It is formally Ireland's only weekly all-vinyl radio show and was the first vinyl show to appear on RTÉ since the 1990s. Back2Basics formerly aired on Dublin South FM and NRG FM from July 2012 to December 2013.

A published journalist, he writes for Mixmag. In 2007 he founded the company Republic PR. Initially a property PR specialist (formerly his role in the UK), he assisted Irish investors in raising the profile of their plight as victims of overseas property scams and helped them form action groups so they could instigate legal action to recover funds from abroad.

Simon spent several years working for free supporting the case of an Eritrean girl Martina Padwick, in her battle to have her Irish citizenship recognised and claim her pension entitlements following the death of her father, who was an Irish soldier stationed in Africa.

Palmer was cited in The Huffington Post after telling Russell Brand that he looked liked a member of ISIS, to which Brand responded "ISIS wouldn't have me".

In 2020, during the first lockdown, he was targeted by Conor McGregor after defending his work for ferry company Stena Line.
