= Back2Basics =

Irish radio show

- Genre: electronic dance music
- Running time: Every Wednesday 23:00 - 00.00
- Country of origin: Ireland
- Language(s): English
- Home station: RTÉ Pulse
- Starring: Simon Palmer
- Recording studio: RTÉ, Dublin
- Original release: July 2012 on Dublin South FM until December 2013; January 2014 on RTÉ Pulse – present
- Audio format: Digital radio
- Website: http://www.rte.ie/digitalradio/pulse/

Back2Basics is an Irish radio show on the Irish state broadcaster RTÉ. It airs on RTÉ Pulse, the dedicated electronic dance music station every Wednesday 11pm - midnight, live on DAB digital radio (where available), the RTÉ Player, the RTÉ Radio Player, the UPC cable service (channel 493), and nationally via the free-to-air Saorview TV service (channel 205) and online via the internet.

The show was previously broadcast using only vinyl records. It went fully digital in January, 2019.

In June 2019 the show was chosen to be part of the Mixcloud Select programme.

The show is presented by Simon Palmer.
