= DSFM =

DSFM may refer to:

- Franco-Manitoban School Division
- Dublin South FM
