= Midlands Gold =

Midlands Gold Westmeath was an independent local radio (ILR) service in Ireland, broadcasting to County Westmeath. It was an opt-out from Midlands 103 (formerly Midlands Radio 3), the ILR contractor for counties Westmeath. Laois, and Offaly, and broadcast from studios in Athlone (95.4FM) and Mullingar (96.5FM). It was operated as part of Midlands 103's sound broadcasting contract from the Broadcasting Commission of Ireland.

Its studios were located in Harbour Place Shopping Centre in Mullingar and at Broadcast Centre, Monksland, Athlone.

It was a community-driven local radio service for the people of County Westmeath.
