= 107.6 FM =

FM radio frequency

This is a list of radio stations that broadcast on FM frequency 107.6 MHz:

== China ==
- CNR Music Radio in Chengdu
- CNR The Voice of China in Datong
- Radio Guangdong Wenti Guangbo

== Germany ==
- Big FM (Kaiserslautern frequency)

== India ==
- AIR Gyan Vani FM

== Ireland ==
- Inishowen Community Radio (Moville frequency)

== Israel ==
- Kol Play

== Kosovo ==
- Radio Drenica

== Malaysia ==
- goXuan (Penang frequency)

== Nepal ==
- Community Radio Madi FM 107.6 MHz, Basantapur Madi Chitwan

== New Zealand ==
- George FM (Southland frequency)

== Russia ==
- Gorod FM

== Turkey ==
- Akra FM

== United Kingdom ==
- Capital Mid-Counties in Banbury
- Dawn FM
- Hits Radio Dorset
- Capital Liverpool
- Greatest Hits Radio Berkshire & North Hampshire (Basingstoke frequency)
- KMFM Ashford
- Life FM (Harlesden)
- Heart Yorkshire (Bradford frequency)
- Q Radio in Larne
- Radio Scarborough
