= Tipperary Midwest Community Radio =

Coordinates: 52°28′30″N 8°9′34″W

Tipp Mid-West Radio
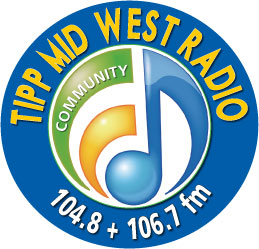
- Ireland
- Broadcast area: South County Tipperary, Ireland
- Frequencies: 104.8 MHz (Tipperary); 106.7 MHz (Cashel); Online

Programming
- Languages: English; Irish
- Format: Freeform
- Affiliations: CRAOL

Ownership
- Owner: Tipperary Midwest Radio

History
- First air date: 1 July 2004

Technical information
- Licensing authority: Comisiun na Mean

Links
- Webcast: Listen Live
- Website: www.tippmidwestradio.com

Tipp Mid-West Radio is a non-profit, community radio station which broadcasts from St. Michael's Street, Tipperary Town, Ireland. It broadcasts on the frequency 104.8fm and 106.7fm in the Cashel area and can be heard in parts of eight counties in Ireland namely: Tipperary, Limerick, Cork, Waterford, Kilkenny, Carlow, Laois and Offaly.

== History ==
The station originally started life as a pirate station (Tipperary Community Radio - TCR), after which it gained a commercial license running under the name Tipperary Mid-West Radio (Tipp-Mid West Radio, for short). In 2003 the radio was almost shut down when a clause was introduced whereby only one commercial radio license would be granted in County Tipperary, Clonmel's Tipp FM gaining favourship for the licence. After a series of debates and protests including a petition signed by hundreds of listeners, the station was given a community radio (non-profit) licence by the BAI (Broadcasting Authority of Ireland).

== Amalgamation with Cashel ==
The station broadcasts live from "Halla na Féile", Cashel town every Friday as part of the mid morning talk show Morning Call. This serves to allow listeners in the Cashel area to hear news and current affairs from their locality.

== Programming ==
The station now broadcasts 24 hours a day, 7 days a week. Live programming goes out from 8 a.m. until midnight daily. Thereafter, the "Overnight Service" is broadcast which consists of selected programming from the previous day's broadcasts. Daily programmes include music, chat, European affairs, current affairs, musician specials etc. Because of the older age bracket of many of the listeners to the station, much of the programmes have a "Country and Irish" music flavour, the preferred type of music among the listeners. Other popular programmes include Catherine Fogarty's "Morning Call" current affairs programme and Tom Hartnett's "Lunchtime Show" including the ever-popular daily brainteaser.

== Website ==
The daily programme schedule from 8 a.m. until 6 p.m., Monday to Friday is the same. The programmes after 6 p.m., at weekends and bank holidays varying somewhat. A full list of the schedule is available on www.tippmidwestradio.com. The website is relatively new and allows listeners to take a look at the obituaries, news and programme schedule. The website also allows people outside the normal broadcast area and abroad to listen to Tipperary Mid-West Radio live on air via the online stream.

Other areas of programming Clodagh Cummin's "Cutting Edge (chart music)" and Pat O'Connor's "Sunday Spin"(Old-time/soft jazz music) to name but a few of the other genres of programmes on the station.

The station comprises mainly on volunteer staff (well over 40 in all) with most of the evening and virtually all of the weekend programmes being presented by voluntary staff.

== Station management, staff and department heads ==
Chairman-Board of Management: Jim Keane
Station Manager / Programme Controller: Eoin O' Donoghue
Advertising: Tom Hartnett
Receptionists: Martina O Donovan & Mary Moloney News: Catherine Fogarty
Sport: Stevie O'Donnell & Francis Coughlan
General / Local Current Affairs Chatshow: Catherine Fogarty (Weekday "Morning Call" chat show)
Farming Affairs: Daniel & Tom Long
Comhaltas Choices (Irish Language/Cultural Interest): John Geehan
Current Affairs Show: Joe Pyrce
Red Cross/Health Interest: Tony Lawlor
