= Bauer Media Audio Ireland =

Irish media holding company

Bauer Media Audio Ireland LP
- Formerly: Communicorp Group (1989–2021)
- Type: Subsidiary
- Industry: Mass media (radio stations)
- Founded: 1989; 37 years ago
- Headquarters: Dublin, Ireland
- Key people: Chris Doyle (CEO)
- Number of employees: 250+
- Parent: Bauer Media Group
- Website: www.bauermedia.ie

Bauer Media Audio Ireland (formerly Communicorp Group) is a media holding company based in Ireland, owned by Bauer Media Group.

== History ==
Communicorp Group Ltd was formed by Denis O'Brien in 1989. It launched its radio operations in Ireland that same year and entered the Czech Republic in 1992. Later, it added stations in Bulgaria, Estonia, Finland, and Hungary. Based in Dublin, the company now owns radio stations including Ireland's Newstalk, Today FM, 98FM, SPIN 1038 and SPIN South West. By then, O'Brien owned both of Ireland's independent (non-state-operated) national radio stations.

O'Brien's Communicorp was the highest bidder for Emap's Irish operations when that company decided to sell its radio stations, buying FM104, Highland Radio and Today FM on 14 July 2007. In October 2007, the Broadcasting Commission of Ireland (BCI) approved Communicorp's proposed takeover of Today FM and Highland Radio, but not FM104. The deal was completed by January 2008. Due to a Competition Authority decision, Communicorp was required to sell on FM104, which it did (to UTV Media) immediately upon its acquisition. O'Brien offloaded Highland Radio in mid-2008.

On 21 July 2008, a joint bid from Boxer TV Access and Communicorp, supported by BT Ireland, were successful in obtaining three digital terrestrial television multiplex contracts from the BCI. Boxer DTT Limited withdrew from its agreement to provide a DTT platform on 20 April 2009.

The group divested its assets in Latvia, Finland and the Czech Republic in 2012; Hungary in 2013.

On 6 February 2014, Communicorp announced it would be acquiring eight UK stations from Global Radio, subject to review by Ireland's Competition Authority. The stations were required to be sold off by the Competition Commission following Global's acquisition of GMG Radio in 2012. The formation of Communicorp UK on 1 April 2014, headquartered in Manchester, allowed Communicorp UK to be operated as an independent operating arm.

The Bulgarian stations were sold in 2018. A restructuring of Communicorp Group at the same year later ceded Communicorp UK's control to O'Brien, making it an independent company.

In February 2021, Bauer Media Group announced it was to acquire Communicorp Group subject to regulatory approval. The acquisition was completed on 1 June 2021 and the company was renamed Bauer Media Audio Ireland.

In August 2023, it was announced that Bauer Media Audio Ireland had acquired the Irish music-driven youth radio station, iRadio.

== Stations ==
Ireland

- 98FM
- Newstalk
- Red FM
- SPIN 1038
- SPIN Southwest
- Today FM
- iRadio
- Beat 102-103
- TXFM (30% ownership; closed in 2016)

United Kingdom (Communicorp UK)

- Capital South Wales
- Capital Scotland
- Heart Hertfordshire
- Heart North and Mid Wales
- Heart Yorkshire
- Radio X 90s Manchester
- Smooth East Midlands
- Smooth North East
- Smooth North West

(All under licence from Global Radio).

- Radio Essex

== Other subsidiaries ==
Communicorp have an interest in the digital and PR agency ICAN, and previously (through its subsidiary Demirca) also operated the online marketplace AppliancesDelivered.ie. The latter began as a magazine called 'Buy & Sell', and changed ownership several times, before being acquired in 2015 and rebranded in 2016. AppliancesDelivered.ie ceased operations in 2019.
