= Dublin City FM =

Irish local radio station

103.2 Dublin City FM (Previously Anna Livia FM)
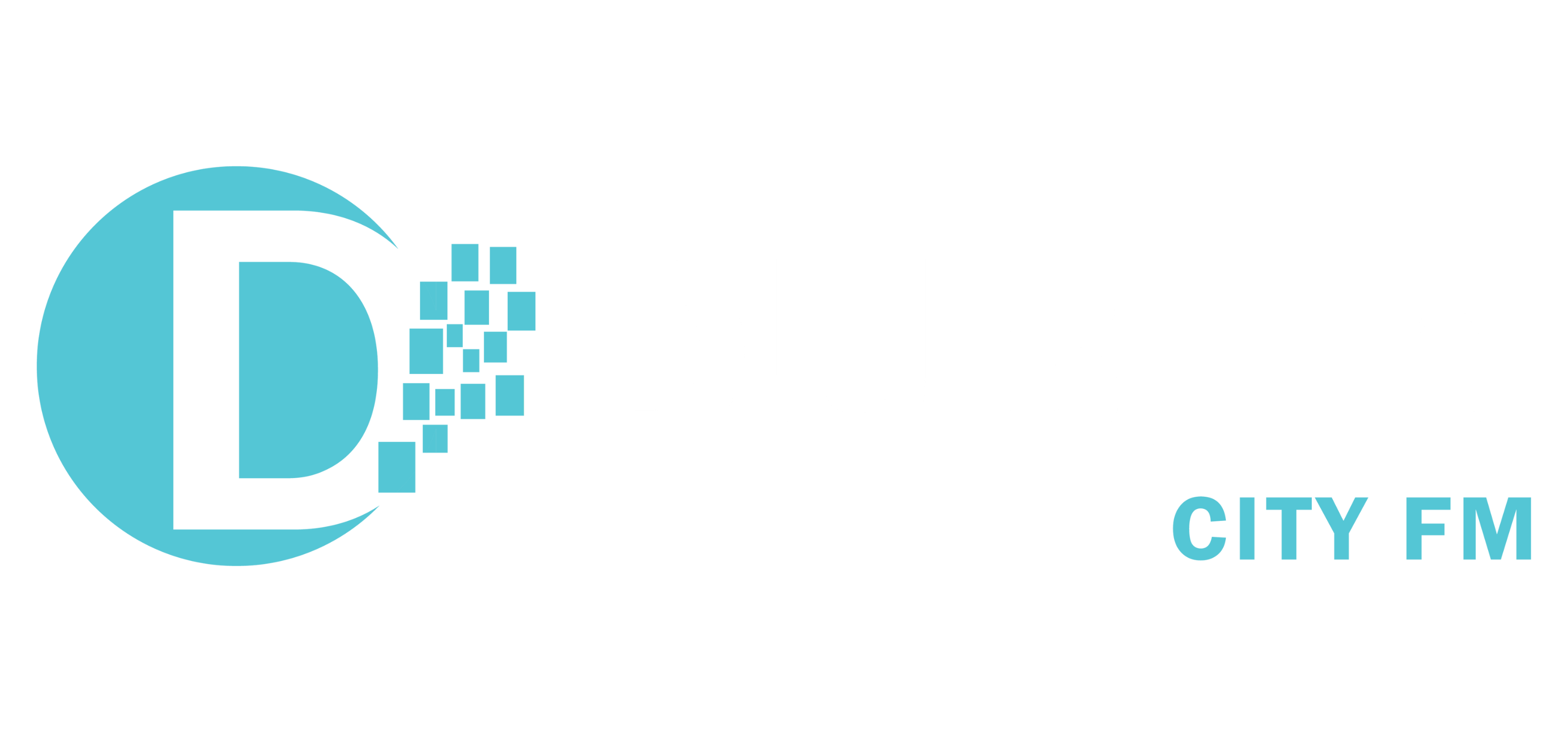
- Ireland
- Broadcast area: Local – Ireland
- Frequency: 103.2 MHz

Programming
- Format: Special Interest

Ownership
- Owner: Dublin Public Service Radio Association Ltd.

History
- First air date: 31 June 1992

Links
- Website: dublincityfm.ie

103.2 Dublin City FM (Previously: Anna Livia FM and Dublin City Anna Livia FM) is an Independent Local Radio station in Dublin, Ireland, operated by Dublin Public Service Radio Association Ltd, under a sound broadcasting contract from Coimisiún na Meán. The station broadcasts on the 103.2 MHz FM frequency. Dublin City FM's Broadcast tower is located on "Rock Solid" tower on Three Rock Mountain, County Dublin. Dublin City FM is Ireland's only special interest, arts and cultural radio station.

== History ==
The station's first broadcast was from Grafton Street, Dublin in 1992. Since 1992, the station has moved several times including to Griffith College and Sheriff Street. & Dublin Docklands|Dublin's Docklands. They are now based near Smuthfield Luas Stop.

In 2001, the station was renamed "Dublin City Anna Livia FM" due to its connection and funding from Dublin City Council. In December 2007, the station was renamed "103.2 Dublin City FM" for advertising and branding purposes.

== Programming ==
The station once broadcast special interest music and talk, to a broad Dublin audience but seems to have a playlisted daytime format now. The Station's flagship show is "LiveDrive", broadcast from 7 to 10am and 4 to 7pm.

Dublin City FM broadcast traffic information every weekday morning and weekday evening on their Live Drive programme. In association with the Dublin City Council traffic monitoring network, broadcasters monitor and analyse over 450 cameras around the city to help listeners avoid traffic. The station broadcasts 7 days a week from 07:00 – 02:00. Programmes Include: current affairs, documentaries, Dublin issues, the arts, literature, business, health, media matters, sport,leisure activities, women's topics, plus special interest Irish and world music.
