= Independent Network News (news agency) =

Former Irish radio news service

Independent Network News (INN) was the agency that supplied national and international news to 30 independent local radio stations in Ireland.

INN supplied copy and audio service from its central Dublin studios via satellite, in addition to hourly news and sport bulletins that were broadcast weeknights and weekends.

== History ==
The organisation was set up in July 1997 to replace two rival networks, FM104's Network Radio News, and Ireland Radio News (IRN), which was operated by 98FM.

IRN came into being in November 1991 when the previous national news service - operated by Ireland's first national commercial radio station, Century Radio - was discontinued following Century's collapse. The principal promoter behind INN was Andrew Hanlon, formerly of 98fm, who went on to become a founding director of TV3 one year after the launch of INN. Hanlon was INN's Managing Director and Editor In Chief. A key funding mechanism of the agency was the sale of advertising airtime during prime time news bulletins and the operation of Adsat, which provided a satellite distribution system for radio advertising copy. Adsat provided a turning point for ad agencies, which had previously relied on the railway system to courier tapes to radio stations. Adsat allowed agencies to send copy and pre-recorded adverts to radio stations via satellite within minutes, allowing late delivery of copy. INN/Adsat was principally funded by the sale and distribution of advertising copy and was of its time, as it preceded the boom of the internet and the ability to send data (including sound and video) through the web.

== Broadcasters ==
The following were the first on-air talent on INN from 1997.

- Jonathon Clinch
- Jerry O'Connor
- Chris Finnegan
- Ken Murray
- Noel Fogarty
- Anne Cadwallader
- John Cooney
- Kerry Gray
- Iarla Mongey
- Deirdre Grant
- Alan Cantwell
- Andrew Hanlon

== Closure ==
On October 1, 2009, it was announced that INN would close down on October 30. Management cited a collapse in advertising in the first quarter of the year, with 16 journalists losing their jobs.

Irish Secretary of the National Union of Journalists Séamus Dooley said the closure was announced rather poorly, as it was being reported by other media before any of the staff was notified. Dooley said, "Fifteen journalists learned that they would lose their jobs through media outlets, that is simply unacceptable... INN staff have made huge sacrifices over the years and are paid well below the market rate for national journalists. They have tolerated a pay freeze and the non-replacement of staff and their efforts are rewarded by this cavalier treatment."
