= Kfm (Ireland) =

Radio station in County Kildare, Ireland

- Ireland
- Broadcast area: County Kildare
- Frequencies: 97.6 & 97.3 MHz

Programming
- Languages: English; Irish
- Format: Adult Contemporary

Ownership
- Owner: Co. Kildare FM Radio Ltd.

History
- First air date: 31 January 2004

Technical information
- Transmitter coordinates: 53.215229°N 6.707827°W

Links
- Webcast: Kfm Radio - Listen Live
- Website: kfmradio.com

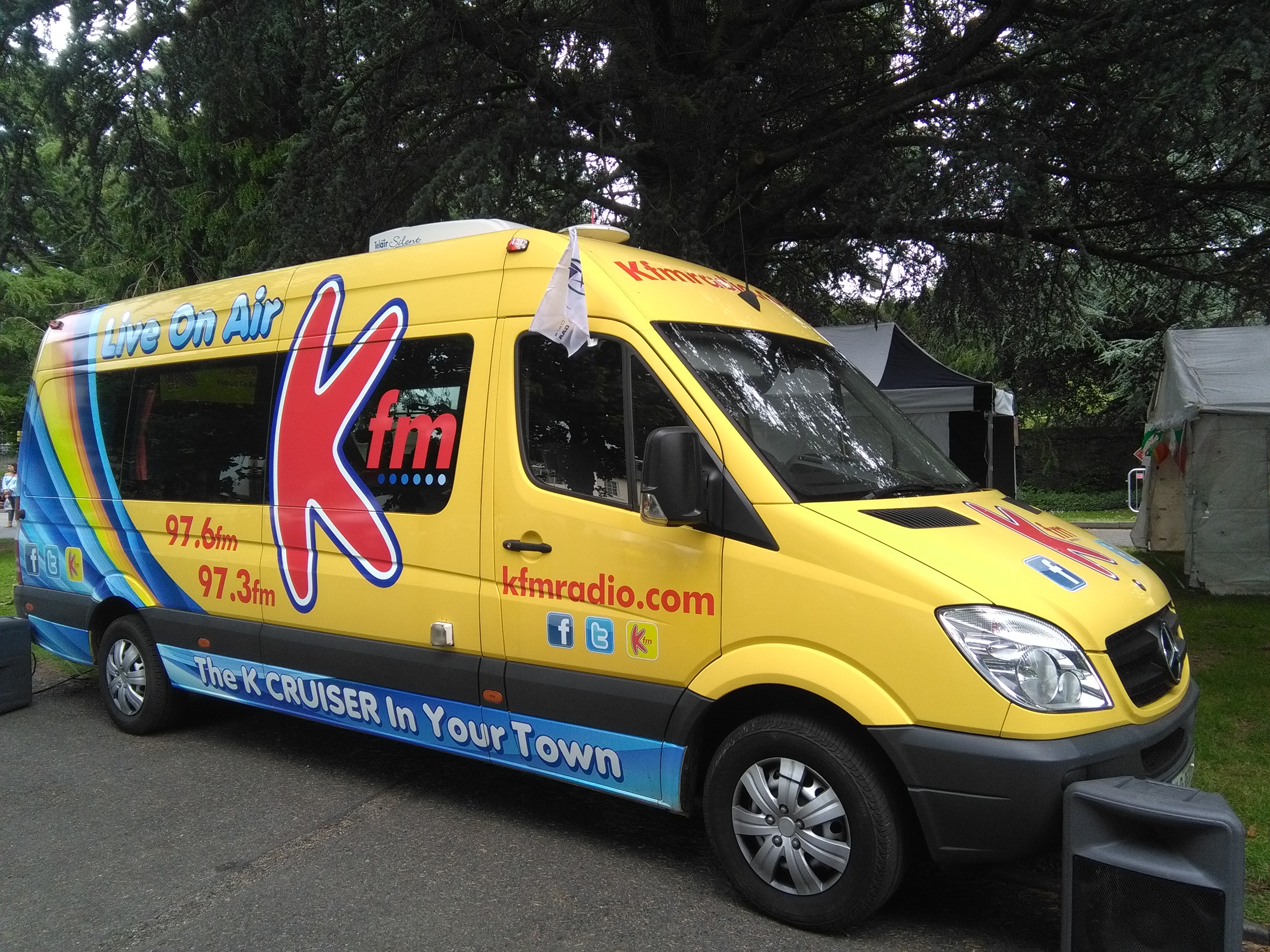
Outside broadcast van

Kfm is an Irish radio station based in Naas, serving County Kildare.

Kfm broadcasts on 97.6fm and 97.3fm to all parts of county Kildare 24 hours a day from the state-of-the-art Kfm Broadcast Centre, Newhall, Naas, County Kildare and around the world on its website and iPhone and Android apps.

It began broadcasting in 2004, having won a ten-year franchise for the county from the Broadcasting Commission of Ireland. Kildare had previously been part of a combined franchise with County Carlow and was served by CKR FM, who did not get their licence renewed.

The station, with a contemporary format, caters for an audience from 15+ upwards.

In January 2014, Kfm was successful in the renewal of its broadcast licence by the BAI for another 10-year term.

Kfm transmitters are based on Slievethoul (Saggart Hill), County Dublin – to serve the north of Kildare on 97.6Fm and in Rossmore, County Laois to serve the south of the county on 97.3FM.

Kfm's broadcast area is the most station saturated in Ireland, primarily due to the close proximity to Dublin City.

Despite the intense competition, for the period from April 2013 to March 2014, Kfm was the most listened to radio station across the week in County Kildare.

The station has been nominated for a number of PPI awards and in 2011 won the FAI's Communications Award (Radio).

The company CEO includes Clem Ryan, Paul Power (Program director), Bertie McDermott (Sales manager), and Ciara Plunkett (News editor).

In November 2019, the ownership changed. Kfm was bought outright by existing director shareholders CEO Clem Ryan and Seán Ashmore. A number of existing shareholders, including David Mongey of Mongey Communications and Liam Ross of the golf buggy supply firm The Buggyman, decided to exit the group. Ashmore is a founding member of Kfm and is the majority shareholder of Wicklow's East Coast FM, as well as a significant shareholder in Dublin's Sunshine 106.8. He is CEO of multi-city radio station Classic Hits and is a director of Spirit Radio.
