= West Limerick 102 =

Community radio station in West Limerick, Ireland

- Newcastle West; Ireland
- Broadcast area: West County Limerick
- Frequencies: 102.2 MHz, Newcastle West/Rathkeale area; 101.6 MHz, Shannon Estuary area; 101.4 MHz, Abbeyfeale area

Programming
- Format: Community radio
- Affiliations: CRAOL

History
- Founded: 2004
- First air date: May 2005
- Last air date: July 14, 2026
- Former names: West Limerick Community Radio

Technical information
- Licensing authority: Broadcasting Authority of Ireland

West Limerick 102 was a community radio station broadcasting to the western parts of County Limerick in Ireland. The station operated on a non-commercial basis with a license issued by the Broadcasting Commission of Ireland. The station went on air in May, 2005 and was officially opened by then Taoiseach Bertie Ahern in April 2006. The station ceased broadcasting on 14 July 2026.

The station had studios in Newcastle West, Abbeyfeale and Rathkeale.

The schedule featured a mixture of programmes covering local news and current affairs, as well as music shows appealing to diverse musical tastes, including country, rock and Irish traditional music.

West Limerick 102 was a member of CRAOL, the Community Radio Forum of Ireland.

== History and background ==
West Limerick 102 was the first ever radio license issued specifically for West Limerick.

The level of interest in having a dedicated station for the region had been tested in 2003 and 2004 by an unlicensed radio operation called NCW 103 (later known as NCW 106 following a move in frequency). In sharp contrast to many pirate radio operations that had previously operated in the Limerick region, the primary focus of NCW was to measure the feasibility of such a station; having determined that the interest did indeed exist, the operators of NCW voluntarily shut down the operation and applied to the Broadcasting Commission of Ireland (BCI) for a license to serve the area.

The initial offering from the BAI was a 30-day temporary license, and following a significant expansion of the team of volunteers and presenters, the station went on air as "West Limerick Community Radio" for the month of June 2004. Broadcasting solely on 102.2FM, the initial pilot covered a range of about 5 miles from studios in the square in Newcastle West.

Following the relative success of the pilot, an application was made to the BCI for a full-time operation, which was subsequently granted, allowing the current station to arrive on-air in May 2005, with an expanded coverage which reached Limerick City and South Clare, as well as additional dedicated studio facilities in Abbeyfeale and Rathkeale.

The station closed down and ceased broadcasting on 14 July 2026.
