= Spirit Radio =

- Ireland
- Broadcast area: Ireland via FM & AM; Leinster via DAB+
- Frequencies: DAB+: FáilteDAB; FM: 89.8–92.2 MHz; 89.9 FM (Dublin); 89.8 FM (Limerick); 90.9 FM (Cork); 91.7 FM (Galway); 90.1 FM (Waterford); 90.1 FM (Bray/Greystones); 90.4 FM (Dundalk); 92.2 FM (Naas/Newbridge); 90.5 FM (Carlow); 90.6 FM (Athlone); 90.3 FM (Ennis); 88.0 FM (County Kerry); AM: 549 kHz

Programming
- Language: English
- Format: DAB+, FM, AM and Online

History
- First air date: 27 January 2011

Links
- Webcast: Listen live
- Website: spiritradio.ie

Spirit Radio is an Irish Christian and religious radio station which began broadcasting in January 2011. It is licensed by the Coimisiún na Meán to broadcast to Dublin, Cork, Limerick, Galway, Waterford, Bray, Greystones, Dundalk, Naas, Athlone, Carlow, Kilkenny and Newbridge on FM. In July 2012, due to licence obligations, the station extended its coverage by opening a medium wave (AM) channel on 549 kHz. The 10 kW medium wave, 549 kHz transmitter is located in Carrickroe, County Monaghan. Following the launch of FáilteDAB in 2025, Spirit began broadcasting on DAB+ throughout Dublin and the wider Leinster area.

The station is in the process of expanding with FM transmitters earmarked for Clonmel, Killarney, Letterkenny and Navan, again using the multi-city licence.

In autumn 2018 the station was launched in Drogheda on 92.1FM. In May 2020 Spirit Radio started broadcasting in Letterkenny on 87.7FM in Donegal.

The station was originally based in Hume House, Ballsbridge, and uses the studio formerly used by FM104. In 2012 the station moved its studios to Bray, County Wicklow, taking up residence in what used to be the Sunshine 106.8 (formerly Dublin's Country Mix) studios.

Its format includes news, talk and music. The music tends to be contemporary Christian or soft rock.

The current presenter line-up includes Wendy Grace, Amy O'Dwyer, Adrian Nolan, Paul kennedy(PK), Olga Kaye and Gerry Healy.

Its weekend programs include 'Saturday Magazine' presented by Jackie Ascough, Sounds of Praise Gospel show, Acoustic Sunday with Cormac Buckley, The Breeze presented by Ollie Clarke plus both Friday night Music & The Chart Show presented by Brian Farrell.

The station is a registered charity and survives on donations from businesses and listeners along with the work of volunteers. The station has a 50–50 on-air gender split, and its volunteers come from various different Christian churches.
