= Dead Hungry Diner =

2012 video game

- Steam cover art
- Developer: Black Market Games
- Publishers: Black Market Games, Big Fish Games
- Platforms: Microsoft Windows, OS X, iOS
- Release: April 23, 2012
- Genres: Puzzle, strategy
- Mode: Single-player

Dead Hungry Diner is a single-player 2D Puzzle and Strategy video game for Microsoft Windows and Mac OS X. Developed by Irish independent video game developer Black Market Games, Dead Hungry Diner is digitally distributed through online game clients. The full version of the game was released in April 2012.

== Development ==
Dead Hungry Diner was developed using a range of free and open software. Fitch Sounds composed and designed the game's sound. On May 16, 2012, Black Market Games self-published Dead Hungry Diner via Valve's digital gaming distribution platform Steam, which supported languages including English, French, German, Italian, Spanish and later Irish. An Irish language version was released in October 2012. An iOS version of Dead Hungry Diner was released on Apple's App Store in April 2013.

== Reception ==
Reception

Review scores
Publication	Score
Gamezebo	4/5 (Windows)
GameZone	7.5/10 (Windows)

Dead Hungry Diner has met with favourable critical reception. Rock, Paper, Shotgun noted its high production value, and compared it favourably to games by PopCap.
