= Claremorris Community Radio =

Radio station in Claremorris, County Mayo, Ireland

Claremorris Community Radio logo

Claremorris Community Radio is a locally-run community radio station in Claremorris, County Mayo, Ireland. It is a Broadcasting Commission of Ireland (BCI)-licensed, communally owned, not-for-profit community media project.

The station aims to reflect the diversity of cultures within its catchment area. It promotes community development in all its aspects, with a combination of information, light programming, music and programmes of regional and local interest. Its intention is to cater for and reflect the new multicultural community of Claremorris and to develop programmes and training that encourage disadvantaged groups to express their beliefs, values and needs.

The station begun broadcasting from the Claremorris Town Hall during 2004 on a temporary license. A full-time license to broadcast was granted in June 2006 and transmissions commenced on 2 September 2006. The station broadcasts on 94.6FM.

In December 2012, Claremorris Community Radio began broadcasting 24 hours/day via its internet stream.

Claremorris Community radio is a member of CRAOL, the Community Radio Forum of Ireland.

== Broadcasting times ==
- Monday to Friday: 8am - 9pm
- Saturday & Sunday: 9am - 9pm
