= Inishowen Community Radio =

Inishowen Community Radio/ICR FM
Ireland
- Broadcast area: Inishowen/North Donegal
- Frequencies: 105 MHz (Malin) and 107.6 MHz (Moville)

Programming
- Format: Mixture of news/music/community programming

History
- First air date: 2002
- Last air date: 17 October 2012

Inishowen Community Radio (ICR FM) was a local radio station broadcasting on the Inishowen Peninsula in County Donegal in Ireland. The station was one of three in the county.

The station was initially granted a five-year licence which was renewed in September 2007 by the Broadcasting Commission of Ireland for an additional ten years. ICR was based in Carndonagh and employed four full-time staff as well as six part-time in addition to unpaid volunteers. The station broadcast seven days a week and under the terms of its licence consisted of 50% music and 50% talk, and like most community and local stations covered a wide range of music including dance, traditional and classical along with its own news team.

ICR's main competitor was the local commercial station Highland Radio, which is based in Letterkenny and broadcasts throughout the north of the county.

ICR FM stopped broadcasting on 17 October 2012 at 11.15am. However, Inishowen Live launched in 2013 with many of ICR's presenters.

== See also ==
- Radio in Ireland
