= SPIN 1038 =

- Ireland
- Broadcast area: Greater Dublin Area; Leinster via DAB+
- Frequencies: FM: 103.8 MHz; DAB+: FáilteDAB

Programming
- Format: CHR

Ownership
- Owner: Bauer Media Audio Ireland

History
- First air date: 19 April 2002

Links
- Webcast: Listen Live
- Website: www.spin1038.com

SPIN 1038 (or simply SPIN; pronounced "spin one-oh-three-eight") is a local radio station in Dublin, Ireland. It is owned by Bauer Media Audio Ireland and broadcasts on DAB+ and 103.8 FM under a sound broadcasting contract with Coimisiún na Meán. SPIN 1038 is mostly heard in Dublin but can also be heard in such towns as Naas, Celbridge, Leixlip, Maynooth, Ashbourne, Dunboyne, Drogheda, Bray and Greystones due to their close proximity to Dublin.

== History ==
The station (which originally applied for its contract as "Spin FM") was one of three new Independent Local Radio (ILR) stations which were awarded franchises in October 1999. It was intended to provide an alternative for listeners younger than those catered for by the original two Dublin ILR stations, FM104 and 98FM. The station however was subject to delays due to legal action from an unsuccessful opposing consortium, however, it finally began broadcasting as SPIN 1038 at 10:38am on 19 April 2002. Despite being initially known as "the dance licence", the station now plays mainly popular music.

Following the launch of FáilteDAB in 2025, SPIN began broadcasting on DAB+ throughout Dublin and the wider Leinster area.

== Programming ==
SPIN 1038 broadcasts mainly Top 40 music aimed at 15- to 24-year-olds. The station broadcasts various programming throughout the day,

News bulletins are aired at on-the-hour from 7am-6pm and consist of local, international, sport news and a five-word weather summary.

== Schedule ==
The station's current schedule can be found here.

== Sister services ==
A sister station, SPIN South West, launched on 23 July 2007 in counties Limerick, Kerry, Clare, Tipperary and south-west Laois. The station is run from Raheen, Limerick and it is similar in format to SPIN 1038 but is independently managed and run. SPIN South West can be picked up in most of the province of Munster, meaning it has a potential listenership of over a million people.

== See also ==
- Nucentz, winner of Ireland's First Rap Superstar Competition launched by SPIN 1038
