= CRY 104.0FM =

CRY 104.0FM is an Irish radio station based in Youghal, County Cork. Areas served by the station include Youghal, Ballymacoda, Ballycotton, Killeagh, Inch, Ardmore, Clashmore, Aglish and Knockanore.

== History ==
Having operated as a "pirate" station from 1979 to 1988, CRY was granted a community broadcasting licence in 1995 to cover Youghal's surrounding areas in East Cork and West Waterford. It was one of a limited number nationwide of what were initially trial community licences, and followed political lobbying in the early 1990s for the station to return with a licence. The appointment of Youghal native Christy Cooney to the then Independent Radio and Television Commission (IRTC), was key to the effort to get C.R.Y. back on the air with a community radio licence. CRY reappeared on the airwaves in September 1995 on 105.1FM, originally with weekday broadcasting hours of 14:00 to 18:00.

The station broadcast for many years on its original frequency, but was moved to 107.2FM in 2002 to facilitate the launch of county-wide pop station Red FM, and then switched to 104.0 MHz in late 2006 after suffering interference in outlying areas from a new national station, Newstalk. The changeover was completed in January 2007.

CRY broadcasts 24 hours a day on the 104fm wavelength and on its website.
