= SPIN South West =

- Ireland
- Broadcast area: Limerick, North Tipperary, Laois, Kerry, Clare
- Frequency: FM: 94.7, 102-103 MHz
- RDS: SPIN SW

Programming
- Format: CHR

Ownership
- Owner: Bauer Media Audio Ireland

History
- First air date: 23 July 2007

Links
- Website: www.spinsouthwest.com

SPIN South West is radio station broadcasting from Raheen in Limerick city to the South West of Ireland. It launched on 23 July 2007, and holds an Independent Regional Radio contract from Coimisiún na Meán to broadcast to County Kerry, County Limerick, County Clare, County Tipperary and south-west County Laois.

== Format ==
The stations markets itself mainly to a young provincial audience in the 15 to 34 age bracket. It plays mainly popular music, and the first song played, by Seamus Barry, and it was Timbaland's "The Way I Are".

The station broadcasts to the Munster region on 102-103 and 94.7 MHz FM. It is on air 24/7 playing popular music during most of the day and dance or techno music during the night.

SPIN South West's format is taken from Dublin's SPIN 1038, the original SPIN station started in 2002, also owned by Bauer Media Audio Ireland. The South West station also simulcasts programmes from its Dublin sister station. The stations make use of split links to regionalise the show, however generic jingles referring to the station as SPIN are used. In mid-2012, SPIN South West began using the same imaging as SPIN 1038, and also stopped its own news in favour of syndicated news from its Dublin counterpart.

== History ==
SPIN South West Limited was founded in 2004 and the station started in 2007 with 47 staff. By 2011, Joint National Listenership Research listener figures showed SPIN South West had a weekly audience of 143,000, an increase of 4000 since the previous figures. It continues to operate under the Bauer Media Group since 2021 but the company has dissolved.

== Awards and recognition ==
The station was nominated for three PPI radio Awards in 2009, for chat show SPIN Talk, Station Imaging, and breakfast show Breakfast Xpresso, as well as one for an insert for The Lisbon Treaty which featured Peter Curtin, Jacqui Leahy, John Hayes & Ciara Revins. In 2009, The Zoo Crew, then presented by Michelle McMahon & Conor Quaid was nominated for a Meteor Ireland Music Award for best Regional DJ. In 2010 Michelle McMahon was nominated for her new time-slot on SPIN @ Work.

In 2013, Eoghain Fitz won Gold for Best Radio Dj. In 2014, Ray Wingnut won a Gold PPI Award for Specialist Music Programme, and also a Bronze Award in the New Irish Music/Musical Talent category. Ed Roche & Sheena Faughnan won The Silver Award for Best Music Programme with The Zoo Crew Hot 30.

== Frequencies ==
Frequency	Transmitter	Service area	Power (kW)
94.7 MHz	Keeper Hill	North Tipperary, and South West Laois	1.0
102.3 MHz	Ennistymon	Ennistymon and surroundings	N/A
102.5 MHz	Knockmoyle	Mid, North and East County Kerry	2.5
102.7 MHz	Ben Dash	County Clare, North County Kerry and parts of County Limerick	10
102.9 MHz	Kilkeveragh	West Kerry	3.0
102.9 MHz	Tullig	Killarney	0.1
103.0 MHz	Woodcock Hill	Limerick City and County	0.5
