= RosFm =

RosFM
Ireland
- Broadcast area: County Roscommon
- Frequency: 94.6 FM

Ownership
- Owner: CRAOL

Links
- Webcast: http://www.rosfm.ie/live
- Website: http://www.rosfm.ie

RosFM is a small local radio station set up by CRAOL. It is a community radio station for County Roscommon.

== See also ==
- County Roscommon
- CRAOL
