= KCLR 96FM =

- Ireland
- Broadcast area: Counties Carlow & Kilkenny
- Frequencies: 96.0 and 96.6 MHz (Kilkenny); 96.9 (Carlow)

Programming
- Format: AC/talk

History
- First air date: May 2004

Links
- Website: www.kclr96fm.com

KCLR 96FM is an Irish radio station which broadcasts to counties Carlow and Kilkenny. It began broadcasting in May 2004.

== Schedule ==
KCLR breakfast with John Walsh is a three-hour show from 7am to 10am and continues to be the most popular breakfast show broadcasting to this region. KCLR live is the news and current affairs show which airs from 10am daily covering all local and national issues. The daily lunchtime show is presented by John Keane from 12 to 4pm followed by The Way it is presented by Sue Nunn.

== Ann Phelan incident ==
Before the 2016 general election, Labour TD Ann Phelan participated in a live radio debate on the station. While there she got into an argument, saying: "I am just going to give up here now. I came to this debate here tonight, I came in here, I've been completely ignored and I'll tell you now I'm fed up of the whole bloody lot of ye." Then she walked out of the studio. She admitted later that she had "absolutely" lost her temper.
