= Flirt FM =

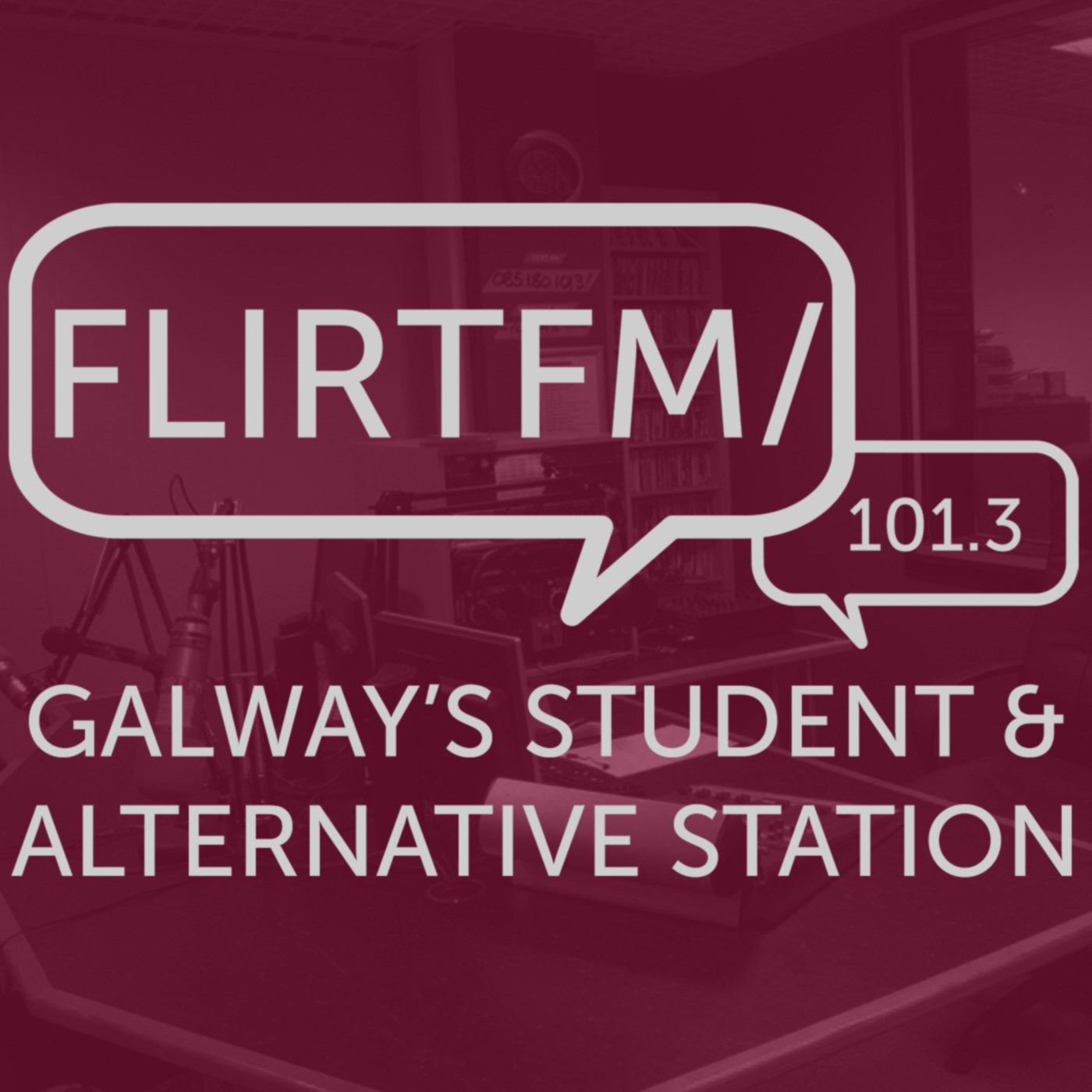
- Galway; Ireland
- Broadcast area: Galway, Ireland
- Frequency: 101.3 MHz
- RDS: FlirtFM

Programming
- Languages: English, Irish
- Format: Student

Ownership
- Owner: College Campus Radio DAC.

History
- Founded: 1995

Links
- Webcast: Listen Live Online
- Website: http://www.flirtfm.ie

Flirt FM is a licensed student radio station located at the University of Galway. It broadcasts at 101.3 MHz on the FM band and a webcast is also available.

Flirt FM is one of three campus community radio stations in Ireland (the others being Wired FM in Limerick and Cork Campus Radio), and one of only 21 licensed radio stations in Ireland (as of 2009). Its social networking innovations have been highlighted by research as facilitating "genuine participation" rather than one-way interactions with listeners.

== History ==
Flirt FM started on air on 28 September 1995, as part of a pilot scheme in community radio operated by the Independent Radio and Television Commission, the regulatory body for non-state-owned radio and television broadcasting in Ireland. One of 11 stations in the scheme, Flirt FM was one of four community of interest stations, all operated by third-level institutions. Billed from the start as 'radio by students for students' Flirt FM was spearheaded by the Radio Society at NUI, Galway (then UCG), which had formed in 1993 with the aim of founding a permanent student station in Galway.

There had been previous temporary stations at UCG, operating as UCG FM during College Week ('Rag Week') under the special event licence provision of the 1988 legislation (which limited groups to 21 days of operation in a year). However, it was not until the Radio Society was formed that moves were made to start a permanent station. A number of factors can be seen as responsible for this - the lack of an appropriate legal framework until 1988 (though there were discussions of the possibilities of educational broadcasting as far back as the 1970s), the fact that the initial round of licensing concentrated on broad-based, and generally explicitly commercial, stations. In contrast, the launch of the Radio Society coincided with the start of Michael D. Higgins' tenure as Minister with responsibility for broadcasting. Higgins appointed a new Independent Radio and Television Commission (IRTC) membership which in 1994 sought expressions of interest in community radio operations. The Radio Society responded, and later that year the IRTC advertised for applications to operate a student-based station in either Dublin, Cork, Limerick or Galway. Six applications were received - three for the Dublin area (UCD, Trinity, DCU) and one each for the other areas. With the support of Sean Mac Iomhair, then Director of A/V services at UCG, and Gearóid Ó Tuathaigh, then VP of UCG, the application was made jointly by UCG and Galway RTC (applications had to be made by a corporate body, in line with IRTC policy). In November, following oral hearings in September 1994, the Commission decided to award four 'community of interest' licences, as opposed to the single licence many had expected - one in each city. 1994-95 was then spent securing the funding and facilities that had been pledged by the two educational establishments, and preparing to go on air.

The station's first station manager was Andrew Ó Baoill, founder and former auditor of the Radio Society. When he returned to his studies in 1996 he was succeeded by Fiona McNulty.

Due to limitations imposed by Irish broadcasting legislation - 20% of time must be devoted to news and current affairs- and by the station's agreement with the IRTC - including that 40% of time would be devoted to talk-based programming - the station has been somewhat limited in the number of hours it can broadcast in any given week. The station started with two hours per day and rapidly ramped up to a 'complete' 39-hour schedule, consisting of 7 hours on weekdays - split between mornings, afternoons and evenings - and 2 hours on each of Saturday and Sunday. In early 1996 the station expanded its content, for a brief few months, to almost 70 hours per week, but was required to return to its smaller schedule as it was not hitting its content quotas in this expanded form.

A 2001 Master's thesis in Communications and Cultural Studies, documents the volunteer participation in the station and recommends further improvements, drawing from Habermas'theory of the public sphere and Theory of Communicative Action. Written by Flirt FM's first station manager six years after its founding, the thesis also documents the history of the station founding.

In September 2015, the radio station celebrated its 20th anniversary.

== Content ==
Brief Description of Programme Service:

Flirt FM will [continue to] serve primarily the 25,000 strong student populations of Galway city and its immediate environs. We aim to provide Galway students with an entertaining, topical engaging and informative alternative to mainstream commercial radio. The output of the station will be diverse and eclectic, reflecting the tastes of our target audience, who are the people both listening to, and participating in the production of the programming.

== Structure ==
For much of its history Flirt FM has had a single paid employee, the station manager, who reports to the Board of Directors of the station. This has been supplemented by additional part-time employees in recent years, leading up to the creation of a full-time production manager role in 2007.

== See also ==
- University of Galway Students' Union
