= Tipp FM =

- Ireland
- Broadcast area: County Tipperary, Ireland
- Frequency: 95.3, 97.1, 103.3 103.9 FM

Programming
- Languages: English, with Irish spoken on air on specialist programmes
- Format: Adult Contemporary

Ownership
- Owner: County Tipperary Radio Ltd.

History
- First air date: 1989

Links
- Webcast: Click Here
- Website: tippfm.com

Tipp FM (Tipperary Local Radio), licensed since 1989 by the Broadcasting Commission of Ireland, is the local radio station covering County Tipperary. In addition to the official franchise area, the station also enjoys a listenership in neighbouring counties.

== History ==
The station was licensed in 1989, initially to the north–south-east of County Tipperary. When the licence was renewed in 2003, the franchise was expanded to the whole of the county. Tipp FM is a full service licensed station whose franchise covers the whole of Co Tipperary.

== Studios ==
The station has studios in Clonmel and Nenagh together with a mobile broadcast unit.

== Frequencies ==
Frequency (MHz)	Transmitter	Service area
95.3	Newport	Newport, O'Brien's Bridge and Birdhill area
95.3	Mullinahone	Mullinahone
95.3	Newcastle	Newcastle
95.3	Carrick-on-Suir	Carrick-on-Suir and surrounding areas
97.1	Scrothea	Clonmel, Cahir and other parts of South Tipp
103.3	Laghtseefin	West Tipperary
103.9	Devil's Bit	North and East Tipperary
