= Connemara Community Radio =

Irish community-based radio station

- Letterfrack; Ireland
- Broadcast area: North West Connemara
- Frequencies: FM: 87.8 & 106.1 MHz

Programming
- Languages: English, Irish
- Format: Community
- Affiliations: CRAOL

Ownership
- Owner: Connemara Community Radio

History
- First air date: 1995; 31 years ago

Technical information
- ERP: 300 watts

Links
- Website: https://www.connemarafm.com/

Connemara Community Radio is a community-based radio station broadcasting for 10 hours per day throughout the north-west Connemara region of Ireland.

It's possibly the smallest radio station operating in Ireland with a possible audience within a franchise area of 13,000 people. The station has studios located in Letterfrack and Inisboffin.

The management and operation of the station is undertaken on a voluntary basis assisted by a small core staff. Involved with the station are a core of 90 volunteers who contribute each week to the station as presenters, technicians, correspondents etc. It also has a Walkers Group who have a fund-raising walk each year.

The Station broadcasts on 87.8 and 106.1 MHz from two 300 watt transmitters, due to the mountainous terrain of the Connemara area.

== Broadcasting times ==
The Station broadcasts six hours of live radio between 11.00 AM – 12.00 PM and 4.00 PM – 9.00 PM and 4 hours of the previous evenings program from 12.00 AM – 4.00 PM.

== History ==
It initially began broadcasting in September 1988 until New Year's Eve 1988 as a pirate radio station. In 1995 Community Radio licences were issued and the station began broadcasting on 1 July 1995.

== See also ==
- Connemara
- County Galway
- Letterfrack
