= Liffey Sound FM =

Liffey Sound 96.4 FM

Ireland
- Broadcast area: Lucan, Dublin and its environs
- Frequency: 96.4 MHz

Programming
- Languages: English and Irish
- Format: Community Radio

Ownership
- Owner: Liffey Sound Communications Co-Operative Society Limited

History
- First air date: September 2006

Technical information
- Power: 5 W
- Transmitter coordinates: 53°20′55.10″N 6°25′24.96″W

Links
- Website: http://www.liffeysoundfm.ie/

Liffey Sound FM is an Irish not-for-profit community radio that broadcasts to the suburban town of Lucan, County Dublin, and its surrounding areas on the frequency 96.4 MHz. The station is operated by Liffey Sound Communications Co-Operative Society Limited and holds a sound broadcasting contract from the Broadcasting Authority of Ireland. Liffey Sound FM is also a member of CRAOL, the Community Radio Forum of Ireland.

== History ==
In 2002, Liffey Sound Communications Co-Operative Society Limited was registered with the Irish Office of the Registrar of Friendly Societies. On 11 July 2006, the Broadcasting Commission of Ireland signed a five-year community radio contract with Liffey Sound Communications Co-Operative Society Limited, and the station began broadcasting in that same month. The official opening of the station took place on 6 October 2006.

Initially, Liffey Sound FM operated with a weekend schedule of 23 hours per week. Over time, the station has expanded its broadcasting hours and currently broadcasts for a total of 58 hours per week. In June 2011, Liffey Sound Communications Co-Operative Society Limited secured a three-year extension to the Broadcasting License.
