= Raidió na Life =

Irish language radio station

- Ireland
- Broadcast area: Dublin
- Frequencies: DAB+: FáilteDAB; FM

Programming
- Format: Mixed network

Ownership
- Owner: Comharchumann Raidió Átha Cliath Teoranta

History
- First air date: September 1993

Links
- Website: www.raidionalife.ie

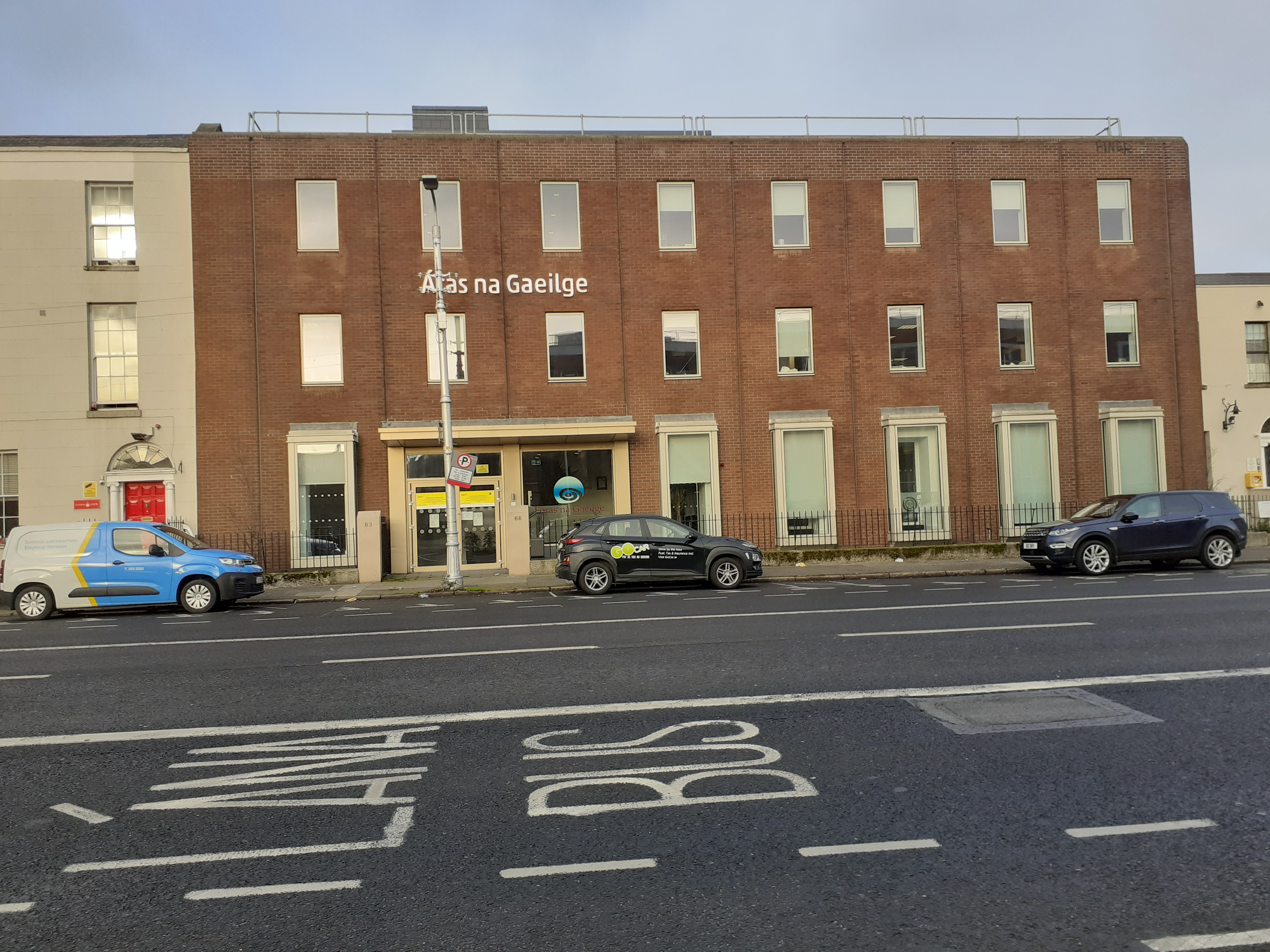
Raidió na Life is based in Áras na Gaeilge on Amiens Street in Dublin City

Raidió na Life 106.4FM (Irish pronunciation: [ˈɾˠadʲiːoː n̪ˠə ˈlʲɪfʲə]; meaning "Liffey Radio") is an Irish-language radio station founded in 1993 and broadcasting in County Dublin, Ireland. In addition to being transmitted on DAB+ and FM, the station's output is available worldwide via the internet.

== History ==
The first independent Irish-language radio station, Raidió na Life 102, came on the air in September 1993 covering Dublin and some neighbouring areas. It broadcasts under licence from the Broadcasting Authority of Ireland. Comharchumann Raidió Átha Cliath Teoranta, which was set up in 1989, is the organisation which owns and operates Raidió na Life 106.4fm. In October 2017, the station moved from the offices of 7 Merrion Square to new purpose-built studios in the new headquarters of Foras na Gaeilge, located at 63-66 Amiens Street on the north side of the city.

== Comharchumann Raidió Átha Cliath Teoranta ==
Comharchumann Raidió Átha Cliath Teoranta (CRÁCT) is the cooperative that was founded on 4 July 1989 as a non-profit organisation to oversee the application for the setting up and operation of Raidió na Life. Membership of CRÁCT is open to anyone who purchases a share in the station. CRÁCT currently has 380 shareholders and is under the direction of the Board of Management.

== See also ==
- Raidió Fáilte – Similar station in Belfast
- List of Irish-language media
- List of Celtic-language media
