= Wired FM =

Radio station in Limerick, Ireland

Wired 99.9FM
- Limerick; Ireland
- Broadcast area: Limerick City & Suburbs
- Frequency: 99.9 MHz FM
- Branding: Wired 99.9FM

Programming
- Language: English/Gaeilge
- Format: Student

History
- First air date: 1995
- Former frequencies: 96.8FM & 106.8FM

Links
- Webcast: Station Stream
- Website: www.wiredfm.ie

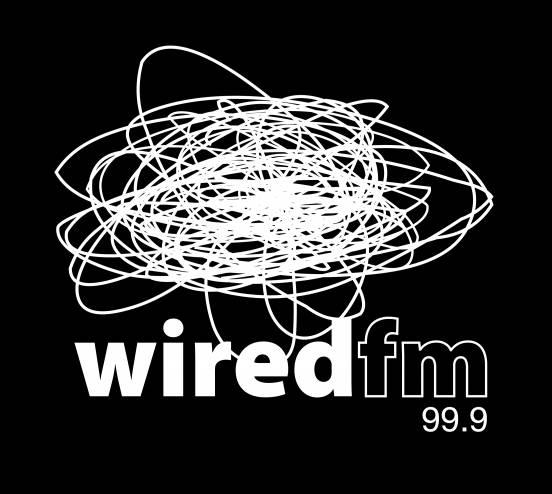
The logo of Wired FM

Wired 99.9FM is a college radio station in Limerick city, Ireland, licensed by Coimisiún na Meán to serve the student population of Limerick City. It is currently run as a partnership between Mary Immaculate College and TUS Midwest. The station broadcasts all over Limerick city on 99.9FM and also streams online.

Wired FM 99.9 is a member of CRAOL, the Community Radio Forum of Ireland.

== History and mission statement ==
The station was licensed by the Broadcasting Commission of Ireland (as the IRTC) in 1995. The station has an active policy of facilitating access, communication and participation for all third-level students to its studios which are located in Mary Immaculate College and Technical University of the Shannon. Wired 99.9 FM's mission statement states that the station;

provides a service that entertains while at the same time provides an accessible platform for information, debate and concerns pertaining to all aspects of student life and to create an awareness of the student community in the region.

== Programming ==
Broadcasting on 99.9FM in the Limerick City area, Wired transmits 60 hours of programming every week during the academic year. The station broadcasts a wide range of programmes, including magazine shows, specialist music, student current affairs, documentaries, education programmes, arts, book and films shows. Music shows cover every genre, from ska to soul, trance to traditional, protest music to metal and always with an emphasis on local and unsigned talent.

== Broadcast hours ==
Wired FM 99.9 currently broadcasts during term time (October to December, and January to May) from 9am to 10pm on 99.9FM with a 24-hour online stream during these days.

== Staff and presenters ==
The station has 2 full time members of staff, including the manager, Ray Burke, the volunteer coordinator, Paul O'Connor, interns, placement students and over 120 student volunteers from TUS (which includes the Limerick School of Art and Design city campus) and MIC who produce and present all of the programmes on the station.
