= Dublin South FM =

Community radio station in South Dublin, Ireland

Coordinates: 53°18′28″N 6°24′47″W

Dublin South FM (DSFM)
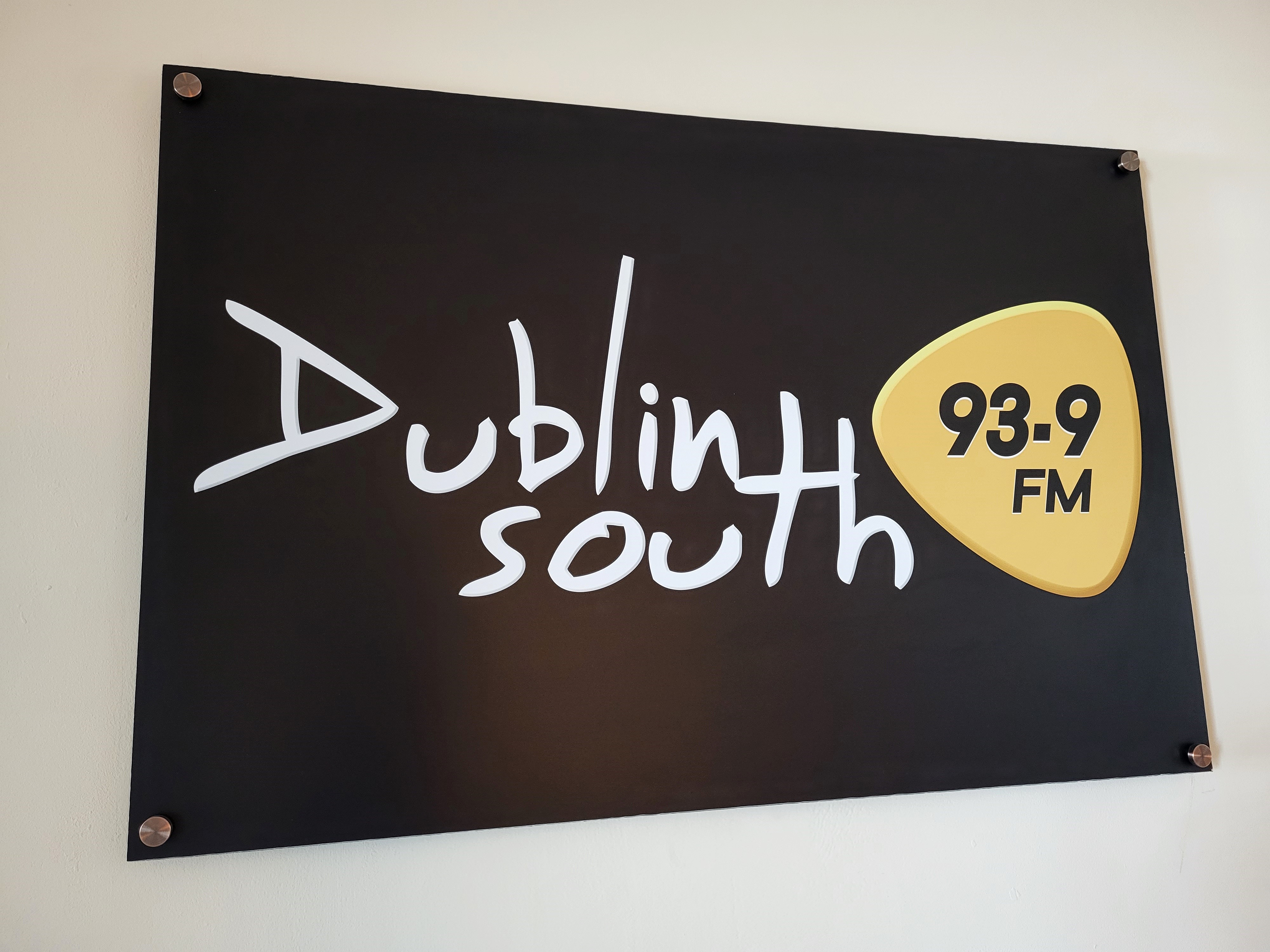
- Dublin, Ireland; Ireland
- Broadcast area: Dún Laoghaire–Rathdown & South Dublin
- Frequency: 93.9 MHz

Programming
- Format: Community Radio

Ownership
- Owner: Common Shareholders

History
- First air date: 5 June 1995

Links
- Website: dublinsouthfm.ie

Dublin South FM is a Community Radio station serving Dún Laoghaire-Rathdown and South Dublin. It broadcasts daily from 11am to 11pm on 93.9FM and online.

The station is operated by a democratic co-operative, Dublin South FM Co-Op, and is open to all individuals and organisations in South Dublin. Over 70 volunteers produce and broadcast 84 hours of programmes each week from its studios in Dundrum Town Centre.

The station focuses on local news and current affairs with an emphasis on supporting community development, and provides a platform to a wide range of local groups in the Dun Laoghaire-Rathdown area. The station also broadcasts a wide range of specialist music programmes (Jazz, Soul, Country, Reggae, Rock etc.) and also features History, Arts, Foreign language, Business programmes and Documentaries.

Dublin South FM was Ireland’s first licensed community radio station and is regulated by Coimisiún na Meán.

== History ==
Dublin South FM, formerly DSCR (Dublin South Community Radio), was formed by the Churchtown Residents Association in 1982 and started broadcasting from a premises off Main Street, Dundrum, before moving to the local Holy Cross School. It was affiliated with the National Association of Community Broadcasters, the precursor to CRAOL. It registered as a Co-op in 1985.

After almost ten years of negotiations, the Independent Radio and Television Commission (IRTC) finally issued advertisements for Community Radio licenses in 1994. After an oral hearing in November 1994, the IRTC board granted DSCR the first broadcast license for a Community Radio station in Dublin.

DSCR began broadcasting on 104.9 FM from the historic Pye Factory in Dundrum on 5 June 1995.

In December 2000, Dublin South Community Radio changed its name to Dublin South FM.

In December 2006, Dublin South FM was instructed to move its FM broadcast frequency to 93.9 FM by the BAI (then known as the Broadcasting Commission of Ireland), to make way for the now-defunct Phantom FM.

In September 2007, the station studios moved to its current location in the new Dundrum Town Centre.

In 2011, Dublin South FM extended its daily broadcasting hours from 4 pm–9 pm to 11 am–11 pm.

In 2022, the station launched its own podcast studio.

In July 2024, Dublin South FM was awarded a new ten-year broadcasting contract by Coimisiún na Meán, securing its licensed community radio service through to 2034.

== Staff ==
The station is managed by a station manager, supported by researchers, production assistants, marketing staff and the Dublin South FM Board.
