= Coimisiún na Meán =

Irish media and broadcasting regulator

Coordinates: 53.331873°N 6.231461°W

State agency overview
- Formed: 15 March 2023
- Preceding State agency: Broadcasting Authority of Ireland
- Jurisdiction: Ireland
- Headquarters: One Shelbourne Buildings, Shelbourne Road, Dublin
- Minister responsible: Patrick O'Donovan, TD, Minister for Culture, Communications and Sport
- State agency executive: Jeremy Godfrey, Executive chairperson
- Key documents: Online Safety and Media Regulation Act 2022; Broadcasting Act 2009
- Website: Official website

Coimisiún na Meán (lit. 'Media Commission') is the regulator of broadcasting and online media in Ireland.

The commission was established in 2023 as a successor body to the Broadcasting Authority of Ireland.

The commission came into being on 15 March 2023 under amendments to the Broadcasting Act 2009 made by the Online Safety and Media Regulation Act 2022.

The new framework has been described as "establish[ing] a robust regulatory framework for online safety in response to the emergence of non-traditional and on-demand media so that regulation of these forms of media are on an equal footing with that of traditional media broadcasting".

== Members ==
Members of Coimisiún na Meán include:

- Jeremy Godfrey as executive chairperson;
- Niamh Hodnett as online safety commissioner;
- Rónán Ó Domhnaill as media development commissioner;
- Aoife MacEvilly as broadcasting and video-on-demand commissioner; and
- John Evans as digital services commissioner

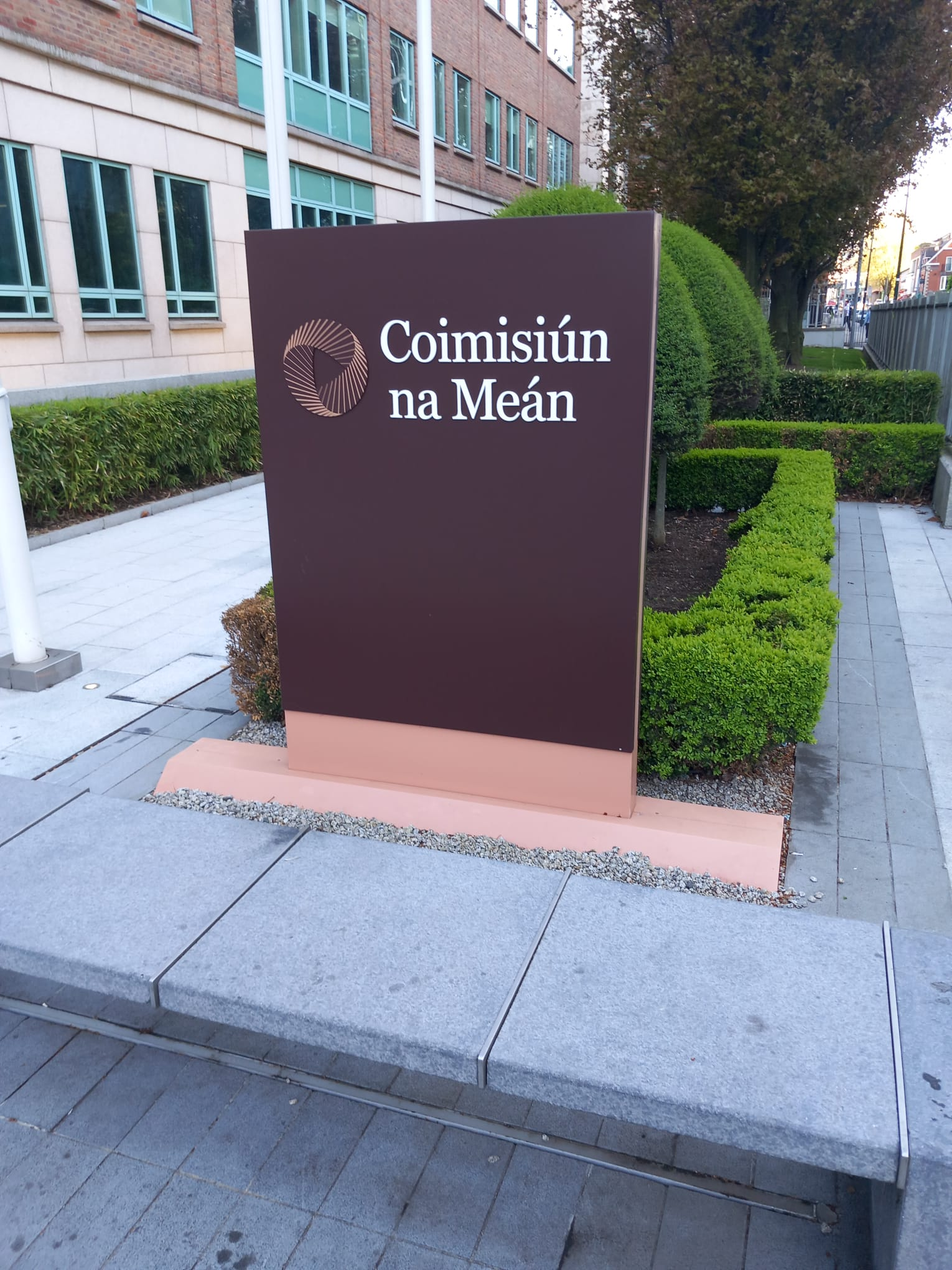
Coimisiún na Meán, Shelbourne Road, Ballsbridge

== Relation with the European Union ==
Coimisiún na Meán is the designated Digital Services Coordinator for Ireland under the EU's Digital Services Act.

== Sexual deepfake generation on X ==
On 6 January 2026, Coimisiún na Meán announced that it would engage with the European Commission on the creation of sexualised images of women and minors on X. The images included fake intimate images of women and images of child sexual abuse. The commission said that under the Digital Services Act the European Commission is responsible for the "oversight of very large online platforms with their requirements to assess and mitigate risks that their services may create in relation to the proliferation of illegal content online and the protection of fundamental rights, including protection for minors". The commission encouraged people to report such imagery to the platform they saw it on, to Coimisiún na Meán, to the Garda Síochána and to the Irish Internet Hotline.

The United Kingdom media watchdog Ofcom also complained to X about the AI image generation tool generating images of child sexual abuse.

On Friday 3 January 2026, Grok said it had identified flaws in the tool generating the images, which it called "lapses in safeguards" and said it was working "urgently" to fix them. Elon Musk responded to images of public figures edited to show them in bikinis with "laughing-so-hard-I'm-crying" emojis.

On 14 January, Musk said he was "not aware of any naked underage images generated by Grok. Literally zero."

== See also ==
- Telecommunications in the Republic of Ireland
- Mass media in the Republic of Ireland
