= Broadcasting Authority of Ireland =

Former Irish broadcasting regulator

- Údarás Craolacháin na hÉireann

State Agency overview
- Formed: 1 October 2009
- Preceding agencies: Broadcasting Commission of Ireland; Broadcasting Complaints Commission
- Dissolved: 15 March 2023
- Superseding State Agency: Coimisiún na Meán
- Jurisdiction: Ireland
- Headquarters: 2–5 Warrington Place, Dublin 2, D02 XP29
- State Agency executive: Dr Pauric Travers, Chairman
- Key document: Broadcasting Act 2009
- Website: www.bai.ie

The Broadcasting Authority of Ireland (BAI; Irish: Údarás Craolacháin na hÉireann) was a broadcasting authority which regulated both public and commercial broadcasting sector in Ireland.

It was established in 2009, effectively replacing the Broadcasting Commission of Ireland (BCI) (Irish: Coimisiún Craolacháin na hÉireann). It was dissolved in 2023 and its staff and functions were transferred to a new body entitled Coimisiún na Meán.

== History ==
- The Authority came into being under the Broadcasting Act 2009.
- The Independent Radio and Television Commission (IRTC) was established under the terms of the Radio and Television Act 1988. This act allowed the first legal stations not operated by RTÉ, the national broadcaster, to come into existence. Prior to this commercial broadcasting in Ireland had been unlicensed and illegal. Despite this a thriving pirate radio scene existed. The Act sought to bring this under a regulatory framework.
- From 1989 onwards the commission began to license Independent Local Radio stations. It also sought to introduce a national radio and television service. But while ILR was mostly successful, both national efforts ran into difficulty.
- In the case of the radio service, Century Radio, it went bankrupt within months, issues surrounding the Minister for Communications, Ray Burke, were also raised as he sought to deregulate the system. In 1997 Radio Ireland won the contract for Ireland's commercial national Radio service, now Today FM. Meanwhile, the selected contractor for the television service TV3, took eight years to find a backer before it finally went on air.
- The Broadcasting Act 2001 gave the Commission its most recent past name and increased its powers. It can now issue contracts for broadcasting via cable, satellite, and most recently DTT under a different model from 2001 Broadcasting (Amendment) Act 2007, and can also develop codes in relation to various broadcasting activities. The first, a code on children's advertising, has proved highly controversial. Under the Broadcasting Act 2009 the commission has been abolished and its powers transferred to the new Broadcasting Authority of Ireland's Contract Awards Committee. The BAI incorporates the role of the Broadcasting Complaints Commission for Ireland and also the regulatory powers of the RTÉ Authority and Teilifís na Gaeilge, these now having simply corporate governance and strategic roles, losing their self-regulatory roles. While the contract award process will not be radically altered, the Authority will now have powers to fine stations rather than having to remove their contracts.
- The commission also operated the Broadcasting Funding Scheme or Sound & Vision which distributes 5% of the collected TV licence to projects on film, TV and radio and under the Broadcasting Authority of Ireland, this will continue, including increased requirements for spend on indigenous programming. This is further to the Broadcasting (Funding) Act 2003. So far over €30 Million euro has been invested into the audio visual sector in Ireland as a result of the scheme, enabling 280 projects to be funded and broadcast in peak listener/viewer times.

=== Previous Role of the Broadcasting Commission of Ireland (BCI) ===
The BCI was responsible for arranging the provision of television and radio services in addition to those provided by Raidió Teilifís Éireann (RTÉ). In addition, it was responsible for developing codes on advertising and other matters, which apply both its own stations and those of RTÉ. Its role has expanded following the statutory instrument signed by Minister Eamonn Ryan on 24 September 2009 to include Analogue terrestrial television switchoff in Ireland (aerial/transmitter system) and licensing the more channel spacious digital terrestrial television channel licensing that it will undertake once the commercial DTT contract is concluded with the current consortium.

==== Contract method under the BCI ====
- The BCI awarded television and radio programme contracts (typically called "licences", though the actual broadcasting licences are really issued by ComReg) by a "beauty contest" system.
- Typically the Authority will decide on the area and type of service to be provided. It then asks for expressions of interest, which will then lead to an actual contest for the contract. Each bidder for the contract submits a detailed business plan and programming proposals to the Authority, which then selects a preferred bidder.
- It will then conduct further negotiations before issuing the contract. However, the previous Commission had limited ability to enforce contracts once issued. It could issue stations warnings or ultimately threaten them with the loss of contract, but this is regarded as a "nuclear option" and is often very unpopular with the stations' listenership. More often, it would try to negotiate with the station in order to influence its programming. Only in one instance – Radio Limerick One – was a station's contract terminated midway through its run. In three further cases – North West Radio, Radio Kilkenny, and Carlow Kildare Radio – the stations contract was awarded to a different company at the end of its term. These decisions proved very politically unpopular and have led to calls for the BCI to automatically renew contracts unless there have been stated misbehaviour. However, as Independent Local Radio stations typically have a monopoly, this would mean no new enterants could ever enter the market.

=== Transition to Broadcasting Authority of Ireland ===
Under the Broadcasting Act 2009 the Broadcasting Authority of Ireland (BAI)

1. took over the functions of the Broadcasting Commission of Ireland and the Broadcasting Complaints Commission,
2. as well as certain powers of the RTÉ Authority and the board of Téilifis na Gaeilge (TG4) on 1 October 2009.
3. It will have new powers to fine broadcasters where it deems appropriate contract breaches require such but do not necessitate premature contract end

The Authority came into being on 1 October 2009. Until then, the BCI continued to operate under the terms of the Radio and Television Act 1988.

=== Members ===
The authority comprises nine members. Five members were announced on 30 September 2009 and were appointed by the Government of Ireland on the nomination of the Minister and a further four were appointed following the nomination of the Joint Oireachtas Committee for Communications, Energy and Natural Resources. In 2009, the five government appointees to the authority were:

- Dr Pauric Travers, the current chairperson; currently a graduate of University College Dublin and the Australian National University, Canberra. An eminent historian and educationalist, he is president emeritus of St Patrick's College, Drumcondra, having completed 13 years as president/CEO
- Alan McDonnell (managing director of Empeira Consultants)
- Grace Smith (legal professional with over 20 years practice as an international lawyer in a large legal practice)
- Professor Maeve McDonagh (academic lawyer specialising in information law including freedom of information, data protection and information technology law and human rights law)
- Seamus Martin (Retired international editor of The Irish Times)

In addition to the authority, the BAI comprised two separate and independent committees: a Contract Awards Committee and a Compliance Committee. The Contracts Award Committee licensed independent commercial and community broadcasters including digital television providers. The Compliance Committee required all broadcasters, public or private, to comply with their licence conditions, broadcasting codes and rules. New codes in relation to children's advertising, among others, were introduced under the Broadcasting Act.

== Sound and Vision Fund ==
The BAI was in charge of the Irish government's Broadcasting Fund which was taken from the TV licence fee. Since 2006, the organisation has given nearly €20million euro to independent producers for TV, radio and film that meet the requirement of the scheme. They have provided funds to programmes and films such as Hunger (Film Four), Aifric and Kings (TG4), School Run (TV3) and Garage (RTÉ). The producer must have the support of a free-to-air broadcaster, the UK's broadcasters are sufficient since they are available FTA via satellite, Setanta have produced a discussion Sports Matter which is unencrypted when it airs on the channel.

== Media Commission ==
Under the Online Safety and Media Regulation Act 2022, the Authority was dissolved on 15 March 2023. A new commission, titled Coimisiún na Meán, was established on that date under amendments to the Broadcasting Act 2009.

== See also ==
- Communications in Ireland
- Mass media in Ireland
