= Jim McCabe (broadcaster) =

- Born: Dublin, Ireland
- Occupations: Radio presenter, Voice acting, Television presenter
- Years active: 1994–present
- Employer: Radio Nova 100FM (Ireland)
- Notable credit(s): East Coast Radio (1994–1999 2004–2005); FM104 (1994–1999 2007–2010); 98FM (1996–2002 2004 2010–2011); Sunshine 106.8 (2004–2007); Lite FM (2002–2004); Today FM (2010–2011); Classic Hits (2011–2021); Radio Nova (2021–Present)

Jim McCabe is an Irish presenter of radio employed by Radio Nova. He also works as a freelance television presenter on both TV3 and Setanta Sports. He has worked on many radio stations as the main breakfast presenter since 1994 on stations such as 98FM, East Coast FM, Lite FM, Dublin's Country Mix 106.8, FM104, Classic Hits.

== Biography ==
McCabe has done voice acting on advertisements and was the main voice image for South East Radio in County Wexford for quite some time.

=== 1994–present ===
McCabe began his career in 1994 working on the Weekday breakfast for East Coast Radio in County Wicklow & also worked on Dublin's radio station FM104 on weekends before moving to 98FM two years later. Between 1996 and 1998 McCabe worked on freelance basis for 98FM & FM104 and remained on the breakfast shift on East Coast Radio Monday to Friday. In early 1999 he was announced as the new main presenter for 98FM morning crew naming it Jim, Deb & The Morning Crew he remained there until 2002 before moving to Lite FM to present breakfast show naming it The Lite Breakfast. McCabe left Lite FM in 2004 after the relaunch of the radio station & returned to East Coast FM to present the weekday breakfast and also did the mid-morning shift on Dublin's Country Mix 106.8 while working for 98FM on a freelance basis. In 2005 McCabe left East Coast FM after being appointed as the programme director for Dublin's Country Mix 106.8 and worked as the breakfast show host. In 2007 McCabe returned to full-time for FM104 after the departure of Colm Hayes & Jim-Jim Nugent to present The Strawberry Alarm Clock alongside Niamh Crowley. In February 2010 McCabe became owner of Max Fitness Gym for women in Leopardstown. McCabe joined Today FM in September, 2010 on a freelance basis after his departure from FM104 and also made a return to sister station 98FM on a freelance basis too. In June 2011 McCabe was hired in to be the new Breakfast presenter for 4fm following schedule changes. In October 2014 McCabe moved from the Breakfast Show to the Mid-Morning Show following the schedule shake-Up. He was shortly moved back again to breakfast to co-host with comedian and actor P.J. Gallagher. This arrangement lasted until Friday 12 March 2021, when they broadcast their last show with. On 1 April 2021, they moved to sister station Radio Nova 100FM (Ireland) to co-host its breakfast show.
