= Denzil Lacey =

Irish radio producer (born 1990)

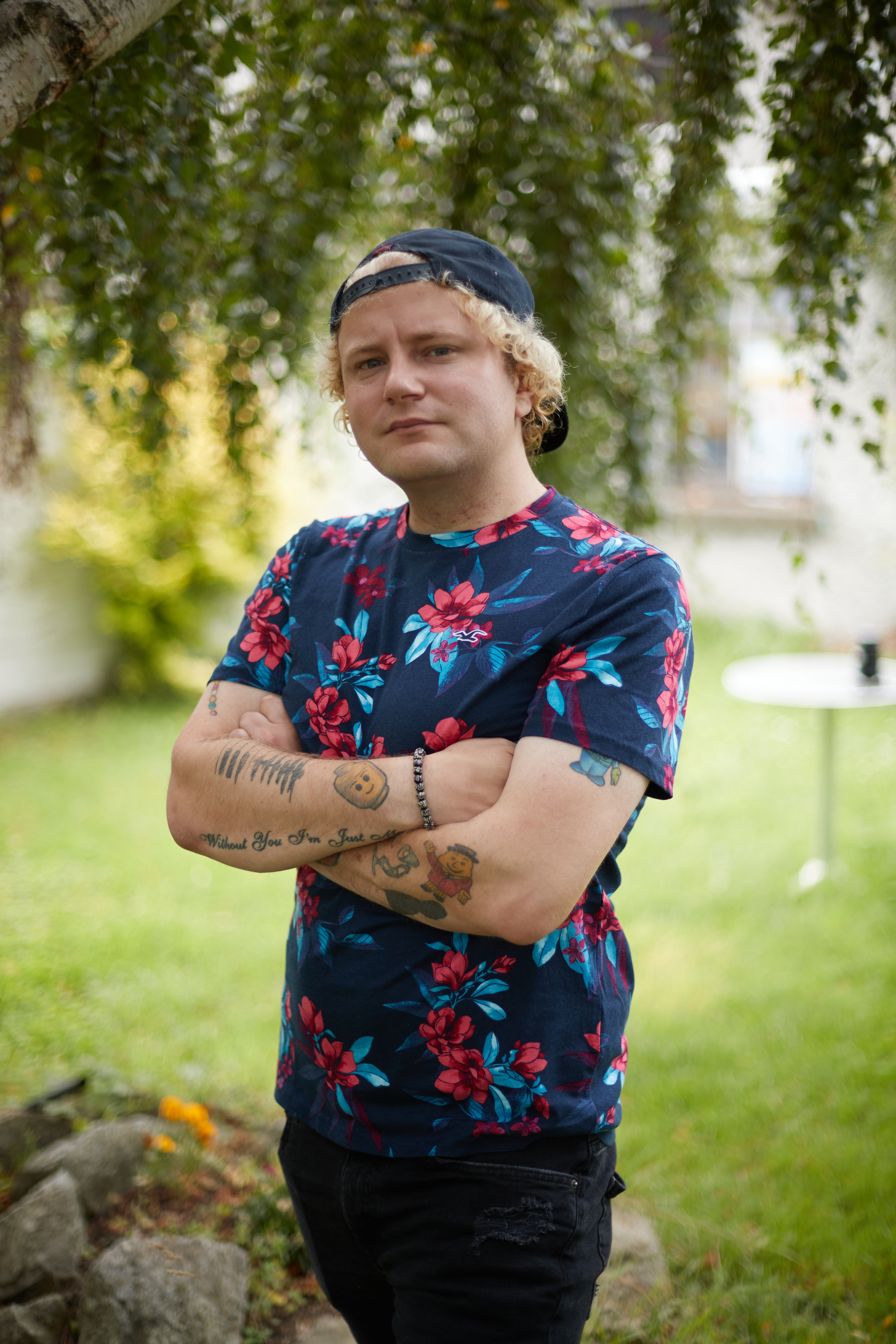
- Born: 27 October 1990 (age 36); Dublin, Ireland
- Education: Presentation College, Bray
- Occupations: Sound designer, composer, imaging producer, voiceover artist
- Years active: 2006–present
- Employer: SiriusXM
- Known for: SiriusXM, Grand Theft Auto VI

Denzil Lacey is an Irish radio producer, sound designer and composer, known for his work in radio imaging and audio production. He has contributed to radio programming and branding for SiriusXM and worked as a radio imaging producer on the video game Grand Theft Auto VI (2026). His career has included work with international radio broadcasters and music production companies.

== Early life ==
Lacey was born in Dublin, Ireland and grew up in Bray, County Wicklow, Ireland. He attended primary school in Glounthaune, Cork and secondary school in Presentation College, Bray.

== Biography ==
Lacey began his radio career on a Dublin "special interest radio station", Dublin City FM, at the age of 14. He later moved on to East Coast FM in County Wicklow." His Late Night Sessions Show ran on RTÉ 2FM for three years, where he presented the Jamaican music show Black Echoes.

Lacey worked across Classic Hits 4FM and Sunshine 106.8 as an imaging producer for the stations owned by Bay Broadcasting Ltd. He left Classic Hits 4FM in 2015 for a new position with Spin South West in a similar role. He has also worked for 98FM and East Coast FM and was assistant station manager for Jam FM at Scouting Ireland's 2008 Jamboree. In October 2016, Lacey presented at The Imaging Days radio conference in Amsterdam.

Lacey joined RTÉ 2fm in July 2016. After a seven-month stint, it was announced he would move to FM104 as production director. As of 2018, Lacey produced radio imaging elements for Diplo's Revolution on SiriusXM, based out of New York.

His composition work has aired on various television series, including: Witches of Salem, Lindenstraße and Tatort.

He is also a voiceover provider for Spotify in Ireland.
