= Adrian Kennedy (presenter) =

Irish radio journalist and broadcaster

Adrian Kennedy is an Irish radio broadcaster who freelances on LMFM, where he has presented the morning current affairs show The Agenda since November 2025. He has also presented on Newstalk, East Coast FM, Ireland's Classic Hits Radio, 98FM & FM104 during his career to date. He was formerly a regular panellist on RTÉ One's Today, broadcast from RTE's Cork studios.

He was host and producer of the late-night radio chat show FM104 Phoneshow, alongside co-host Jeremy Dixon, from 1997 to 2013. When he left the programme, it was the highest-rated nighttime radio show in Ireland.

In August 2013, Kennedy and his co-host and producer Jeremy Dixon resigned from FM104 to take up a job offer with the rival station, 98FM. Due to a stipulation in their contracts, both were placed on six months' garden leave after their final show on 25 September 2013.

Kennedy presented the morning phone-in show Dublin Talks on 98FM, alongside Dixon, from 2014 to April 2021. On 23 April 2021 it was announced on air that the duo had presented their last show on the station. This meant that 98fm would move to a more music oriented format. Following his departure from 98fm, Kennedy and Dixon set up an online podcast called Opinions Matter.

== Personal life ==
In 2006, Kennedy was convicted of drunk driving after being found to be almost double the legal limit, and was banned from driving. Kennedy was described as a "shock jock" by the Irish Independent in an article regarding his drunk driving conviction, for his controversial and contrarian on-air persona.

Kennedy married his second wife, Linda Byrne, in December 2017. He has two adult children from his first marriage.
