= Gareth O'Callaghan =

Irish writer & former radio and TV presenter (b.1961)

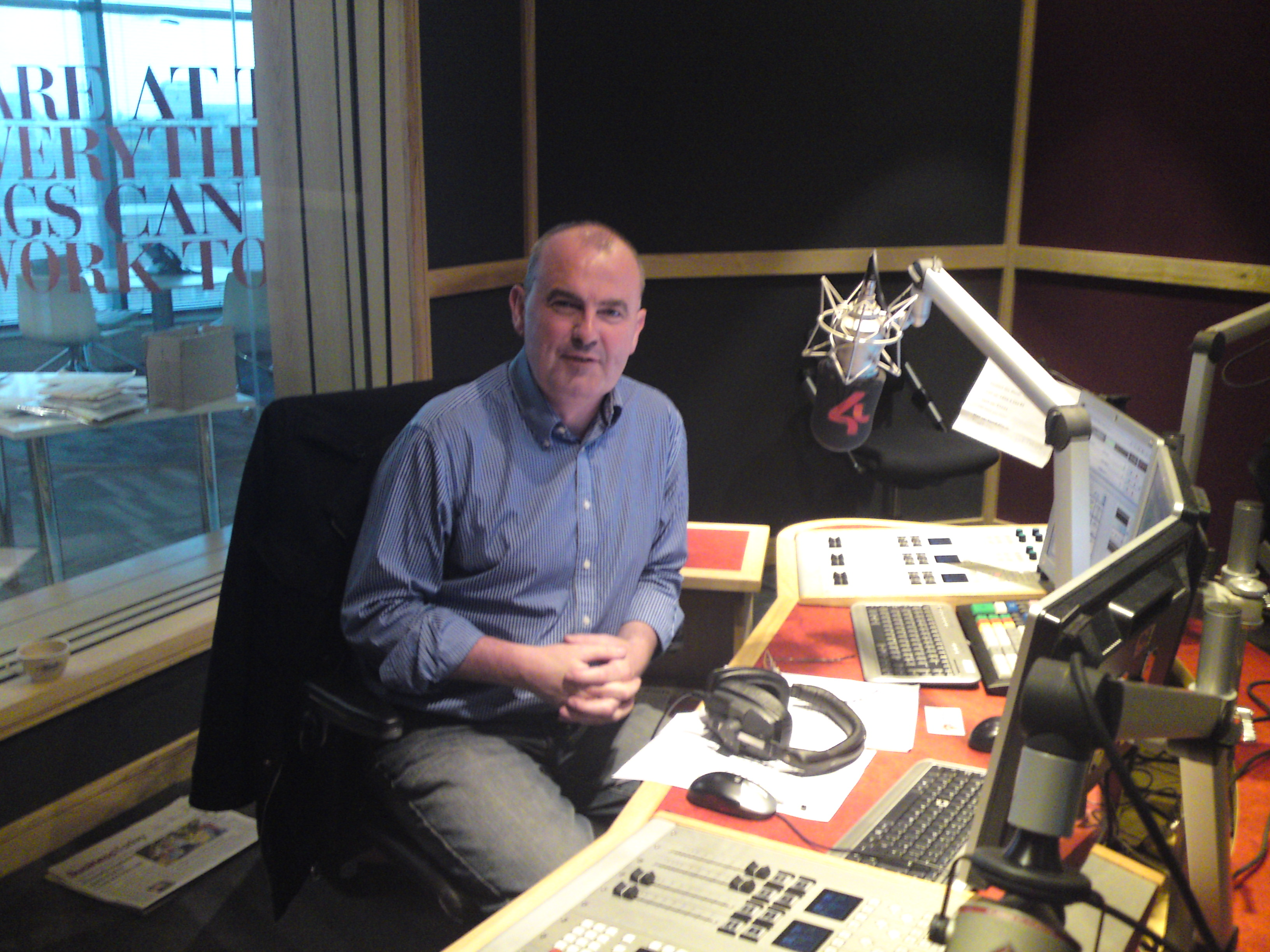
- Gareth O'Callaghan in the 4fm studio
- Born: 17 March 1961 (age 65)
- Occupation: Radio presenter
- Known for: Writing and mental health advocacy
- Height: 6 ft 3 in (191 cm)
- Spouse: Paula Delaney (m. 2020)
- Children: 3 daughters

Gareth O'Callaghan (born 24 March 1961) is an Irish writer and radio and television presenter. He was most recently heard on 4fm, having presented shows on RTÉ 2fm for much of his career until 2005, and then a show on Galway Bay FM. In January 2022, he returned to radio following a 4-year break, presenting a new Saturday morning with Ireland’s Classic Hits Radio. He is currently serving as interim presenter of the station's weekday Night Time Talk show, following the sudden departure of presenter Niall Boylan to contest in the 2024 European Parliament election in Ireland.

== Early life ==
When he was eleven years of age in the early 1970s, O'Callaghan was first abused while staying at a Franciscan Brothers house, St Anthony's, in Clara, County Offaly, along with a group of young people he knew. The brother began by showing him how to bake bread during the day and then bringing him to his bedroom at night. When O'Callaghan's stay at the house ended, the brother arrived at his house on Dublin's Navan Road, bearing gifts for his mother and staying the night, sleeping opposite the boy he had abused. The next day his mother informed him in the brother's presence that he had been invited to Clara for the Easter holidays. O'Callaghan was unable to tell his mother in the months that followed and he set off from Heuston Station with a little brown suitcase. He was picked up at the train station in Clara and driven back to St Anthony's. This time he was the only child in the house. He was given a room near where his abuser was sleeping, one with an adjoining door. On the second night of this, O'Callaghan made a 5 am escape down some stairs when the brother had fallen asleep. Aware of a train from Galway that would arrive at 7 am, he hid among a woman and her children at Clara train station and then made his way back to Heuston Station. He then took a bus home, informing his mother that the brother had been required to go away. She never asked her son about the absent little brown suitcase.

O'Callaghan began to experience nightmares, which lasted for many years, and consisted of his abuser returning. After telling a teacher he was ill he left school early, approaching his Inter Cert examinations, and attended confession at St Mary's Pro-Cathedral with the intention of explaining what had happened to him. The priest was unsympathetic, accused O'Callaghan of defaming the brother's name and told him to get out. He then told his mother when he returned home and received a more sympathetic response, with her insisting he was not to blame for what had happened. At the age of twenty, O'Callaghan once more met his abuser. The brother recognised him but O'Callaghan turned and ran.

== Career ==
=== Radio ===
O'Callaghan started working with small pirates such as Radio Dublin. He then was a presenter on "superpirate" Radio Nova in the early 1980s, followed by Sunshine Radio (briefly), later Energy 103FM and Q102 (briefly). He spent a few years on UK radio, after his spell with Sunshine Radio in 1983, starting with offshore pirate Radio Caroline.

After Q102, O'Callaghan joined legal Irish radio with Millennium Radio and then in 1989 he moved to the newly relaunched "2fm" – an attempt by RTÉ to take advantage of the recently departed Superpirates. He then presented the Gareth O'Callaghan in the Afternoon show which was similar in theme, tone and content to the Steve Wright in the Afternoon show on BBC Radio 1 of the late 1980s and early 1990s. This show was a huge success gaining O'Callaghan widespread popularity all over Ireland by offering a brand and style of commercial radio that was more reminiscent of Radio Nova in Dublin at the very height of its popularity.

O'Callaghan left RTÉ 2fm's afternoon show, having previously presented the breakfast show on the station (replacing Ian Dempsey). After leaving 2fm, O'Callaghan took some time out from radio to pursue a career in psychology before being named presenter of the breakfast show on Galway Bay FM. On 27 February 2009 Gareth launched Ireland's newest commercial independent Quasi-national radio station 4fm(now called Ireland's Classic Hits Radio) where he was the morning show host before moving to the afternoon slot.

Before Gay Byrne's retirement from The Gay Byrne Show in 1998, he was helped a bit by O'Callaghan but O'Callaghan left him after getting fed up and went to RTÉ 2fm instead. Des Cahill had to help Byrne after that.

In 2010, O'Callaghan spoke out against cocaine use following the death of Gerry Ryan, a former colleague and friend. He acknowledged that he had known of Ryan's cocaine use for 16 years and received criticism and intimidation after speaking about this in public.

In January 2022, it was announced that O'Callaghan was to return to Ireland's Classic Hits Radio, to present a new Saturday morning programme.

In April 2024, O'Callaghan was appointed as the interim host of Classic Hits' Night Time Talk show, following the sudden departure of long-running host Niall Boylan after 30 years. Boylan announced his intention to run for a seat in the 2024 European Parliament election in Ireland live on air, and agreed to step down with immediate effect for editorial reasons.

=== Writing ===
O'Callaghan has been writing since 1995. To date, he is the author of six best-selling works – five novels and a memoir. He has contributed two stories to the New Island Open Door series, entitled Joe's Wedding and Stray Dog.

New Island publishes literary fiction, poetry, drama, biography, politics and social affairs. O'Callaghan wrote A Day Called Hope: A Journey Beyond Depression about his own personal experience of severe depression. The book detailed how, as soon as left his radio job each day, he would retreat to his bed, sometimes with thoughts of suicide. It became one of the biggest-selling books in Ireland in 2003, and continues to sell in huge numbers. It has been published in 15 countries, and translated into 10 languages.

O'Callaghan is also a regular contributor to many of the national newspapers in Ireland, having written regularly for The Irish Times, the Sunday Independent and the Evening Herald. He is currently writing a sequel to A Day Called Hope, and is also said to be working on a new novel. His seventh book, What Matters Now: A Memoir of Hope and Finding a Way Through the Dark, was published in March 2021.

== Personal life ==
O'Callaghan's first marriage broke down in 2005. With little money, he took to living by himself in a flat. He met Paula Delaney in March 2015, a fortnight after O'Callaghan's "dear friend" Tony Fenton died (O'Callaghan had listened to the tributes to Fenton and asked for an end to the loneliness he was then experiencing, thus causing him to wonder if Fenton "wherever it was he had gone to after his death" had arranged the encounter between himself and Paula). He married her in Cork Registry Office in September 2020.

O'Callaghan lives in Cork with his wife. He has three daughters, Kerri, Katie and Aibhín.

=== Health ===
O'Callaghan experienced depression from the 1990s until 2015. In 1999, he lost three stone in less than three months and was prescribed antidepressants, which he was on for two years.

In early 2016, he started to suffer from a pounding heart. In late 2017, he fell over a sofa at work (the Classic Hits radio station).

In March 2018, O'Callaghan announced to listeners of Neil Prendeville's Cork's Red FM show that he had developed Parkinson's disease (PD). He said: "I was tripping. I was dropping things in work. When you drop a cup of coffee literally out of your hand and it scalds your foot and people look at you and think 'what's wrong with him?' I fell out of the bath one morning and I didn't understand why I fell out. I have noticed changes in you have to stop and choose words. It is not that your speech changes the way you transport the words it happens in a different way. When I was diagnosed I was told I have had this for a couple of years which in a way was a relief to me. There were times over the last few years where I thought I was going mad. I couldn't figure out what it was." O'Callaghan mentioned that, prior to his diagnosis, he had read a Daily Mail article in which DJ David Jensen spoke of his experience of Parkinson's.

O'Callaghan retired from radio in August 2018 after being diagnosed with the neurodegenerative illness multiple system atrophy (MSA), an incurable and even more rare disease (less than 3,500 people were at the time thought to be enduring the condition in the whole of Ireland and the UK). In an online post, he wrote "It is a rare disease, very progressive and sadly incurable. I thought I might have been able to continue working as normal for another few months but, unfortunately, the pace and the painful decline of this awful thing has really taken us by surprise."

O'Callaghan spent six weeks in hospital after a car crash in Cork in March 2023.

=== Advocacy ===
O'Callaghan is a prominent supporter of suicide and depression-related topics, having had previous personal experience of these throughout his adult life. He has written books dealing with such topics, and was a supporter of the Irish suicide charity Console Suicide charity Ireland before its closure, representing them in Dáil Éireann debates on at least one occasion.

| Preceded by Ian Dempsey | RTÉ 2fm's breakfast show 1998–2000 | Succeeded by Damien McCaul |
