= Red Gap =

Hill in the Dublin Mountains, Ireland

Coordinates: 53.2472°N 6.4766°W

Red Gap, also known as Saggart Hill or Slieve Thoul, is a hill 397 metres above sea level situated 16 kilometres southwest of Dublin city centre in the Dublin Mountains close to Saggart and Rathcoole. The hill gets its name from the townland of 'Redgap' which lies just to the north of it. Today, Red Gap is home to farmland and telecommunication masts. The hill has FM radio transmitters for Newstalk, Kfm, LMFM, iRadio and East Coast FM.

The hill is also home to low-power fill in transmitters of Nova 100 and 4FM, designed to cover the Dublin commuter belt

The old-time song "Campbell's farewell to Red Gap" is believed to be referring to this hill.

== Archaeology ==
Rosaleen Dwyer, Heritage Officer of South Dublin County Council, noted the presence of archaeological sites on the hill in a 2015 talk, explaining:

Another of the upland sites are over there towards Saggart Hill... Slieve Thoul wood and Lugg Wood, again you've got a concentration of prehistoric burial tombs including two passage tombs inside the hill itself, two further passage tombs on the lower slopes, a barrow (a ring barrow) in Lugg Woods itself, and three further barrows in an enclosure further south so that's a huge collection of archaeology that's just asking to be interpreted in the correct way with appropriate routes and trails..."

== Radio transmissions ==
Frequency (MHz)	Station	Power (kW)	Notes
94.6	Classic Hits 4FM	0.1	Covers commuter belt area of County Kildare and County Meath.
95.5	LMFM	2	Covers south County Meath. Notable for being well outside the stations coverage area of Counties Meath and Louth and provides significant coverage into North County Dublin
97.6	Kfm	1	Directional signal into County Kildare.
99.9	East Coast FM	2	Directional signal into County Wicklow. Moved from 94.9 in 2005.
100.5	Radio Nova 100	0.1	Covers commuter belt area of County Kildare and County Meath.
104.7	iRadio	4.95	Provides coverage of County Kildare and County Meath. Also has overspill into County Dublin
107.6	Newstalk	1	

== See also ==
- List of mountains and hills of County Dublin
