= Declan Meehan (radio presenter) =

Irish radio presenter

- Occupation: Broadcaster
- Employer(s): East Coast FM, Today FM

Declan Meehan (Irish: Déaglán Ó Míocháin) is an Irish radio presenter. Currently fronting The Morning Show with local radio station East Coast FM, his career has incorporated involvement with multiple pirate radio stations (including Radio Milinda, the first to be raided and prosecuted) and, later, RTE Radio 2 (where he was one of the pioneering station's original presenters). From there he moved to the superpirates of the 1980s, before a spell with legal radio in London, England. He is remembered for "presenting a cool and calm front". on the morning that Radio Nova was raided in May 1983. He had joined the station from Sunshine Radio.

When Radio Milinda was threatened with closure in December 1972, Meehan declared on air in the week prior to the eventual raid, that they would "fight anybody who tried to close them down". Years later, he commented on the raid:

"We were fined £2, all the equipment was confiscated and it was great fun, a great adventure."

== List of stations worked with ==
- Radio Vanessa 1970–1972
- Radio Valerie (Arno St.Jude)1972
- Radio Milinda (Arno St.Jude) 1972
- RTÉ Trinity Radio 1976 Temporary Licence
- ARD (Arno St.Jude) 1976–1978
- Big D 1978 (Declan Matthews)
- ARD 1979
- RTÉ Radio 2 1979–1980
- Sunshine Radio (Used his real name on pirate radio from this period on) 1980–1982
- Radio Nova 1982–1984
- Capital Radio London 1984–1988
- RTÉ Millennium Radio 1988
- Century Radio 1989–1991
- FM 104 1992–1996
- East Coast FM 1994–present. He has presented the weekday mid-morning slot for many years,
- Radio Ireland/Today FM 1997–2016. "Sunday Breakfast with Declan Meehan" 7am – 10am every Sunday morning
