= Radio Nova (Ireland) =

Former Irish pirate radio station

Radio Nova was an Irish pirate radio station broadcasting from Dublin, Ireland. Owned and operated by the UK pirate radio veteran Chris Cary, the station's first broadcasts were during the summer of 1981 on 88.5 MHz FM and 819 kHz AM.

== Early history ==
Prior to Nova's arrival, Irish radio consisted of the government broadcaster RTÉ and a number of local AM pirate stations. Radio Nova was the first station in Ireland to use a high-powered signal on FM. By 1982 Radio Nova was pulling in over 40% of the available audience around Dublin. In September 1982, Radio Nova (operating on 88.1FM and 819AM at the time) introduced a new service called Kiss FM on 102.7 MHz - inspired by Los Angeles-based 102.7 KIIS-FM.

Radio Nova's jingles were produced by JAM Creative Productions in Dallas, Texas (to the melody of WLS FM & AM, alongside KIIS).

Prior to May 1983, the stations had been allowed to operate without interference from the Irish government. However, on 18 May 1983, officials from the Department of Posts and Telegraphs together with Irish Gardaí raided the transmitter sites of Radio Nova and Kiss FM. Both stations went off the air until the next day. Following the raids, the Minister for Communications claimed in the Dáil (25 May 1983) that intermodulation products resulting from co-located transmitters for Radio Nova and its sister station Kiss FM had caused interference to emergency services' frequencies around 74 MHz for a period in the previous month.

On 19 May at 6.00 a.m., Radio Nova returned to the air to announce that they would be closing down at 6.00 p.m. that day. They urged listeners to protest against the government and to show up at the Nova studios in Herbert Street, Dublin 2 for a huge protest. The story was on the front page of every national newspaper and was headline news on RTÉ. The hysteria continued when a rival pirate Sunshine Radio was raided at 9.00 a.m. By 6.00 p.m., there were several thousand people outside the studios of Nova as the station played its last record.

The political fallout of the Nova closedown was huge. More protest marches continued and following criticism of the government's action by the judge in the State's case against Nova, the station resumed broadcasting some days later.

In December 1983, Radio Nova started test transmissions on UHF TV. The station was to be "Nova TV" and was to run a similar format to MTV in the United States. Tests stopped after the government raided the studios and warned they would not tolerate a pirate television station operating.

More trouble was to hit Radio Nova in 1984. The state broadcaster RTÉ which had seen its audience dwindle due to the arrival of Nova and other large pirate stations started a jamming campaign against Radio Nova. The jamming continued for some weeks and made the reception of Nova almost impossible at times. The station eventually went into receivership and shut down its Kiss FM operation. Eventually, the Irish government ordered RTÉ to stop the jamming and once again Radio Nova flourished.

== NUJ Dispute May 1984 ==
By the middle of 1985, the radio dial in Dublin was getting very crowded. Although the station remained firmly at number one (some survey books during this time show Nova at 62% reach in Dublin), they faced increasing competition from RTÉ and other pirates like Sunshine Radio. There was now also Q102, a station founded by former Radio Nova DJ Lawrence John, after being pressured not to cross the NUJ picket line at Radio Nova. To try to increase revenue, Radio Nova launched a new station called Magic 103. Magic 103 was an easy listening station with a lot of local news and current affairs designed to appeal to the Irish government who were taking part in a national debate about local radio, similar to National Public Radio in the United States. Magic 103 was not a success, however, and was shut down by Chris Cary at very short notice. This infuriated the National Union of Journalists who called a strike and placed pickets on Radio Nova. They also urged advertising agencies to boycott the station. With advertising revenue down dramatically and trouble in the boardroom, Cary pulled the plug on Radio Nova with just three hours’ notice on 19 March 1986.

== Nova after closure ==
Subsequently, another station began broadcasting using most of Nova's old equipment and frequencies under the cover name of Zoom 103, later rebranded as ENeRGy 103, NRG 103 stood for "Nova re-generated". However, despite various name changes (Energy Power 103 FM, a "merger" with Radio Nova (The Hot 100 FM), then a re-launch station called Nova Power 103 FM, and once again reverting to the "Energy Power 103 FM" name) this station never enjoyed the same success as its predecessor and was eventually bought out and shut down on 11 March 1988 by rival station Q102. Within two weeks, Q relaunched themselves as "Super-Q102" on NRG's four FM frequencies ranging from 99.9 to 103.1 MHz which effectively "boxed in" Sunshine 101.

Chris Cary subsequently launched a satellite radio station, called “Radio Nova International”, from a studio on the Albany Park Industrial Estate, Frimley, in the United Kingdom. The station was used as an overnight sustaining service by a number of UK and European radio stations.

== Nova presenters and airstaff ==
- Andy Archer
- Mike Edgar (news and disc jockey (DJ))
- Colm Hayes - Former FM104 and 2FM DJ and now PD for Classic Hits.
- Casey Kasem
- Rick Dees
- Terry Riley
- Chris Cary aka "Harry"
- Sybil Fennell
- Gary Hamill (news and disc jockey (DJ))
- John Clarke - Former 2FM DJ and producer and boss, formerly with Radio Nova 100FM (Ireland).
- Jason Maine
- Bryan Dobson (news) - former presenter of Six One News on RTÉ One
- Anna Cassin (news) - now presenter of Nationwide on RTÉ One
- Ken Hammond (news) - former RTÉ Newscaster
- David Harvey
- Emperor Rosko
- Tom Hardy - former PD for Today FM and a radio consultant
- Declan Meehan (radio presenter) - already had much pirate radio experience and had left 2FM and rejoined pirate scene before joining Radio Nova, now a DJ with East Coast FM.
- Hugh O'Brien
- Bob Gallico (newsreader) presenter
- Tony Allan* Paul Kavanagh
- Stuart Vincent
- Denis Murray
- Tony Fenton
- Tony Gareth aka Gareth O'Callaghan - former RTÉ DJ, now on 4FM
- Bernie Jameson
- Tony Mackenzie
- Andrew Hanlon aka Dave Johnson - now TV3
- John O'Hara
- Jim Cotter
- Greg Gaughran now with Radio Nova 100FM (Ireland).
- George Talbot (Drivetime)
- Lawrence John (ALL NIGHT NOVA, 1983 & 1984) founded Q102, Dublin in 1985 and ENERGY 106, Belfast 1997. Launched online tribute station www.RadioNOVAinternational.co in 2021, including himself, John Clarke & Tony McKenzie
- Chris Barry - late night talk show host FM104
- Scott Williams - now CEO (and presenter) with Dublin's Q102.
- Aidan Cooney - Had been with a number of pirates before Radio Nova and a few afterwards. Now works on Dublin's Q102.
- Frank Wynne
- Mike Moloney, aka Mike Moran
- Dave Malone - newsreader
- Mike Duggan
- Kathy Quinn
- Jessie Brandon
- Mark Costigan, aka Mark Weller - newsreader
- Siobhán Purcell - newsreader
- George Long
- John Lewis
- Ric Harris
- Ernie Gallagher
- Noel Clancy
- Don Allen
- Derek Jones
- Henry Condon
- Peter Madison
- Richard Jackson
- Roland Burke
- Eddie West former Downtown Radio Belfast presenter

== See also ==
- The Radio Nova Story on Radiowaves.fm
- Radio Nova 100FM (Ireland) - Dublin radio station of the same name which began broadcasting in September 2010.
- Irish pirate radio
