= Adrian Lydon =

Irish journalist (born 1976)

- Born: 1976 (age 49–50); Oughterard, County Galway, Ireland
- Education: Dublin City University, Mary Immaculate College
- Occupations: Television reporter, newsreader
- Employer(s): Raidió Teilifís Éireann (RTÉ), Galway Bay FM
- Known for: Breaking the Leas Cross scandal and the Bank of Ireland stolen laptop story

Adrian Lydon (born 1976) is a reporter/producer for CNN, he previously worked as a television reporter for the Nine O'Clock News on Raidió Teilifís Éireann (RTÉ).

Lydon was responsible for the first media reports on the Leas Cross scandal and the Bank of Ireland stolen laptop story.

A native of Oughterard, County Galway, he was first a newsreader on Galway Bay FM and moved to in 2006. He has been an RTÉ news reporter since January 2008.

Adrian holds a degree in media from Mary Immaculate College, in Limerick and a masters in journalism from Dublin City University.
