= Century Radio =

Former Irish radio station

Century Radio, also known as Century 100 and later Century FM, was a short-lived national commercial radio station in the Republic of Ireland, broadcasting from 4 September 1989 to 19 November 1991.

== History ==
=== Launch ===
Launched at 8am on Monday 4 September 1989, Century Radio was intended as the first licensed alternative to RTÉ Radio 1 within the Republic of Ireland and the country's first national commercial station. The first song played on the station was Pride (In the Name of Love) by U2.

The national licence was issued in an effort to kill off pirate radio in the Republic of Ireland, but full coverage was only achieved in early 1990. It later emerged that Century's licence was issued illegally, as the then Minister for Communications, Ray Burke, received a bribe in the region of IR£100,000 to issue the licence. Burke was later jailed for making false tax returns after the allegations surrounding the licence were investigated by the Flood Tribunal.

The station's investors, including Terry Wogan (the first voice heard on the station) and Chris de Burgh, were anxious to secure a quick return on their money, and unwilling to wait and see if the station's fortunes would turn around. Its major competitor, RTÉ, broadcast Century over their transmitter network without claiming their fee, which was repeatedly reduced in the hope of actually receiving payment.

A £400,000 publicity campaign at launch was deemed to have failed because of confusion over the station's frequencies. Those living outside of Dublin would not find the station even close to 100-102 FM, if they could even find it at all, because of the poor coverage.

=== Programming ===
The station's playlist consisted of mainstream chart hits from the 1970s and 1980s, backed up by slick production and jingles from JAM Creative Productions in Dallas. Unsuccessful attempts by Century to acquire major RTÉ talent also led to problems. After their IR£1 million offer for Gay Byrne was turned down, they tried unsuccessfully to poach several other personalities from the national broadcaster, although they did secure the services of leading Radio 2 DJ Marty Whelan as breakfast presenter. Kenny Everett also contributed a daily ten-minute Captain Kremmen show to the station.

Century's sports service proved popular, with Capital Gold's live football commentaries relayed on Ireland's Scoreboard on Saturday afternoons. Capital's two main commentators at the time, Jonathan Pearce and Steve Wilson, would later feature on Match of the Day. Other notable sports coverage included live commentaries of Dundalk F.C.'s 1991-92 European Cup campaign, and, in a major coup, Century were first to announce the starting line-ups for the 1990 All-Ireland Hurling and Football Finals.

=== Financial problems and closure ===
The Government of Ireland tried a number of measures to assist Century, including Ray Burke's imposition of a cap on the maximum amount of advertising RTÉ could carry. But this measure made it more difficult for Century to exist as it reduced the rates RTÉ charged to carry advertising - leading to a knock-on effect on how much Century could charge. The cap was not abolished until the Labour/Fine Gael Government came to power in the mid-1990s, after Century ceased broadcasting.

In November 1991, with Century's losses reaching £7 million, its major shareholder Oliver Barry sold off his 28% stake in the company, leaving Capital Radio as the main investor. When an effort to find new backing failed, Capital pulled out and Century was placed into liquidation on Tuesday 19 November 1991. The station ceased broadcasting at 6pm that evening, immediately following a short news report by journalist Dairena Ní Chinnéide announcing its demise.

Later that month, a last-minute attempt by Oliver Barry to save Century Radio was accepted by the Independent Radio and Television Commission, but collapsed when it was rejected by one of the existing major shareholders.

Century's franchise was left idle for six years before it was re-issued to Radio Ireland (Today FM), who were allocated frequencies in the 100-102 MHz band from the start (except 105.5 in the North East of Ireland).

== Transmission ==
Initially, Century's highest frequency transmitter was at 100.3 MHz, with all others sitting in the 98 MHz band (e.g. 98.4 MHz at 50W in Limerick and 98.4 MHz at 500W in Cork). Within the first year the frequencies were eventually changed, ranging from 100.0 to 101.8 MHz – the frequencies now carrying Today FM.

Within weeks of launch, Century also began broadcasting on 1143 AM in Dublin and Cork.

== Presenters (from launch 1989) ==
- Marty Whelan
- Dave Harvey
- John Saunders
- Catherine Maher
- Emer Woodful
- Liam Quigley
- Declan Meehan
- Bob Gallico
- Mark Byrne
- Jim O' Neill
- Joe Harrington
- Terry Wogan
- Flo McSweeney
- PJ Curtis
- Sandy Harsch
- Kara Hanahoe

- David Davin Power
- Con Murphy
- Paddy Clancy
- Ronan Mac Aodha Bhui
- Richard Crowley

== See also ==
- Mahon Tribunal (corrupt payments to obtain broadcasting license)
