= List of mountains and hills of County Dublin =

County Dublin (shaded dark green)

The website PeakVisor states, as of February 2024, that there are 41 mountains or hills in County Dublin, Ireland, while in the same month the Database of British and Irish Hills lists 16.

== List ==
- Athgoe Hill
- Ballybetagh Hill
- Ballybrack Hill
- Ballycorus
- Ballymorefinn Hill
- Barnaslingan
- Ben of Howth
- Black Hill
- Carrickgollogan
- Corrig Mountain
- Cruagh Mountain
- Dalkey Hill
- Glassamucky Mountain
- Glendoo Mountain
- Great Sugar Loaf
- Holtrass Hill
- Killakee Mountain
- Killegar
- Killiney Hill
- Kilmashogue
- Kippure
- Knockananiller Hill
- Knockandinny (or Crockaunadreenagh)
- Knockanvinidee
- Knocknagun
- Little Sugar Loaf
- Lugg
- Lugmore
- Montpelier Hill
- Mountseskin
- Naul Hills (Highest point: Knockbrack)
- Newtown Hill
- Piperstown
- Prince William's Seat
- Saggart Hill (or Slieve Thoul)
- Seahan
- Seefin
- Seefingan
- Shamrogue Hill
- Shielmartin Hill
- Slievenabawnoge
- Tallaght Hill (Knockannavea)
- Three Rock Mountain
- Tibradden Mountain
- Two Rock Mountain
- Verschoyle's Hill

The Database of British and Irish Hills includes Knockbane, the highest point of Lambay Island (elevation and prominence both 146 m (479 ft)).

== See also ==
- List of mountains in Ireland
