= Radio Milinda =

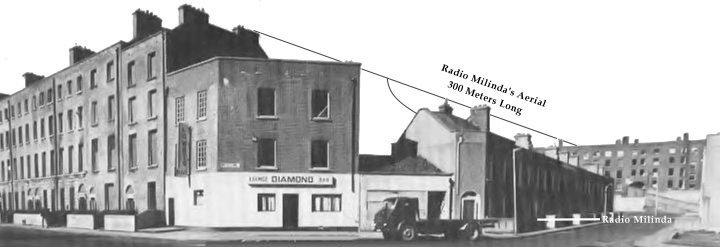
- Ireland
- Broadcast area: Dublin, Ireland
- Frequency: 300 metres / 1000 kHz

Programming
- Format: Pop to oldies

Ownership
- Owner: No longer transmitting on air.

Technical information
- Power: 100 watts

Links
- Website: radiomilinda.com

Radio Milinda was the first pirate radio station in Ireland to be raided by Gardaí and prosecuted. On Sunday, 17 December 1972 almost 100 Gardaí raided the station at 5 North Gloucester Place, Dublin (better known as The Diamond). Seven people were arrested and taken to Store Street police station, where they were later fined £2. The equipment and all records and tapes were confiscated.

== History ==
Radio Milinda was originally the brain-child of Jimmy McCabe who built the guts of the transmitter. The Name "Milinda" which should have been "Melinda", was taken from the 1967 song "Come Away Melinda" as sung by Tim Rose.

The station first began test transmissions early on in 1972 from the upstairs of a youth club in Dublin 1. with a very small transmitter. Ger Wallace designed the Big Transmitter. Jimmy McCabe constructed it in a biscuit tin and the chassis of a broken E.C.G. machine. The aerial was strung from the roof of the tenements in Summerhill to the roof of the tenements in Sean Mc Dermott Street "No Mean Feat" (5 Stories High). It was 300 metres (980 ft) long with a tap at 100 metres (330 ft). It came into the station via the roof of 5 North Gloucester Place.

The station was set up in two rooms in the basement. These rooms had been unused since the Second World War and were used without alteration other than the cable run for power. There were no windows and the studio per se was built of bits of orange boxes and whatever else came to hand. The first DJs were Jimmy Lynch, Jimmy McCabe (McCabe's Country) and Richie Kearns. They were later joined by Michael Lynch, Declan Meehan and Mark Storey and on one or two occasions by Fran Gleeson. Although it has been stated that the power output was of 50 Watts, Radio Milinda had QSLs from Wales, Brighton and other locations in the United Kingdom. Radio Milinda became a member of B.I.R.M. Brighton Independent Radio Movement, an organisation who tried to legalise the then pirate radio scene.

== References and sources ==
Notes

Bibliography

- Radio Radio, Peter Mulryan, Border Line Publications, ISBN 1-870300-03-3
