= FM 104 =

FM 104 may refer to:

- FM104, a station in Dublin, Ireland
- Farm to Market Road 104
