= RLO =

RLO may refer to:

- Het Rijnlands Lyceum Oegstgeest, a secondary school in the town of Oegstgeest in South Holland
- Right-to-left override, the Unicode control character
- Valle del Conlara Airport, the IATA code RLO
- Radio Limerick One, a licensed radio station serving Limerick city and county
- Rickettsia-like organisms (RLOs)
