= Pirate radio in Cork =

Radio station in Cork, Ireland

== CBC, ABC, CCLR & Capital Radio ==
While pirate radio stations existed in the Cork city area in the 1960s and 1970s eg Radio Juliette, Radio Cobweb, the first full time stations began in early 1978 with CBC on 230 metres and CCR on 216 metres. From the summer of 1978 these two stations were joined by ABC Radio on 233 metres from Montenotte.

In early 1979 ABC closed down and was replaced by Capital Radio Cork, also on 233 metres, operating from a premises in Tuckey Street.

CCR changed its name to CCLR, installed a more powerful medium wave transmitter (200W approx) and moved frequency to 1143 kHz(v) announced as 261 metres. CCLR was based for most of its existence at French Church Street in the city centre. It remained the most powerful medium wave pirate radio station until the advent of South Coast Radio and ERI in the early 1980s.

All these stations were staffed by local DJs and focused primarily on disco and other popular music styles of the era.The stations aired a limited amount of advertising from local businesses. There was little by way of news or other features but CBC and Capital aired some programmes in Irish and Irish music eg Gaelic Corner on CBC. CCLR did a big band Jazz programme on Saturday mornings and also did a number of 1950s and 1960s style music shows appealing to slightly older listeners.

In September 1979 CBC ceased broadcasting which left CCLR and Capital Radio as the only two stations in the city. The youth oriented, legal, professional national, Semi-State operated RTE Radio 2 had launched in May 1979 and, while it could be heard well on FM in suburban Cork and less well from Athlone on 612 kHz, 490 metres 100 kW, it had yet to launch a local medium wave transmitter (Autumn 1982, a 10 kW on 1278 kHz, 235 metres) so CCLR and Capital remained popular with younger listeners in city areas with AM radio still in use by most listeners.

== Radio City Cork and the introduction of FM ==
On 31/08/1980, a new station Radio City came on air from Parnell Place in the city centre on 1512 kHz (v), announced 199 metres. After a few months FM was added in parallel on 95.7 MHz(v), notable as the first station to use FM in the Cork City area. Later due to interference between City and Youghal based CRY, Radio City moved from 1512 kHz to 1251 kHz (v) announced 240metres.

Capital Radio briefly experimented with FM in early 1981.

Around this time Big Brother Radio operated for a few months, part-time from the Sunday's Well area of Cork City on 88FM.

These stations were joined for a short period by a new version of ABC Radio on 235 metres.

In May 1981, Radio Caroline Cork launched on 98.8 MHz (v) FM on a part-time basis. See section below for further details.

Radio City introduced news, specialist music shows and community features while primarily continuing to focus the bulk of its output on chart and older popular music.

== Leeside Community Radio ==
Leeside Community Radio commenced broadcasting on New Year's Eve 1981 on 102 MHz FM from a premises on Grand Parade in the city centre. While low power the station was notable for its format focusing on alternative pop, rock, soul with specialist shows featuring Jazz, New Wave, Arts News and feminist issues. Due to TV interference, the station moved to 98 MHz FM in early summer 1982.

== Closure and Renewal 1982 ==
The summer and autumn of 1982 brought big changes. Following the launch of South Coast Radio (see below) in March 1982 the older, smaller stations struggled to make an impact. The first to close was Capital Radio Cork which shut down in June 1982 and briefly merged with Leeside Community Radio. Leeside closed down shortly after on 31 July 1982. Radio City Cork closed in September 1982.

CCLR and the hobby oriented Radio Caroline were the last of the old stations on air. CCLR purchased City's FM transmitter allowing it to operate on FM for the first time (95.5 MHz FM), Caroline began medium wave transmissions and ERI arrived in Cork (see below) bringing about major change.

== CCLR Expansion ==
CCLR, under new management, embarked on a significant expansion in 1983, installed a more powerful medium wave transmitter (257 metres) in Glounthaune linked to its French Church Street studio via a transmitter on 98FM based at the studio, brought in new staff and new, professionally made jingles. It introduced a tighter music format and for the first time invested resources in news and current affairs. Despite the upgrades the station closed just before Christmas 1983. Competition from the much larger South Coast Radio and ERI (see below) resulted in dwindling audiences and resources despite the best efforts of management and staff.

== South Coast Radio ==
On March 3, 1982, South Coast Radio began broadcasting on 103.2(v) FM stereo (announced 104) from a suite in the Metropole Hotel in McCurtain Street. A relatively high power (600W) professional medium wave transmitter was added within a couple of weeks, based at a site near Cork Airport. A 150 ft lattice tower was used giving the station large coverage and the use of professional processing gave the station superior audio compared with the older stations. The station had professional studio and production equipment and had custom made jingles. Presentation was professional and the team consisted of local, Dublin and UK DJs and newsreaders, many who had radio experience previously in the offshore and Dublin superpirate scene.

The station later moved to St Lukes where it operated from a premises over a bar.

In 1983 a 10 kW medium wave transmitter was installed near Dublin Hill, replacing the Airport Hill transmitter on 1557/1566 kHz. This gave the station greatly extended coverage but a fire put the transmitter out of action some months later and South Coast reverted to using the smaller Airport Hill based transmitter.

The fire at the 10 kW rig, a sustained jamming campaign by an individual and competition from ERI (see below) put the station under financial pressure and eventually off air in July 1984.

== ERI ==
In late May 1982, Eastside Radio began operating from a period house in the seaside village of Ballycotton about 25 miles east of Cork City. It used a 200W Medium Wave transmitter on 1305 kHz and a small FM transmitter on 102 MHz. It was operated in a semi professional manner throughout the summer of 1982.

In September 1982, the station embarked on a major expansion. It was renamed ERI, a large 5 kW medium wave transmitter was installed on the very clear frequency of 1305 kHz (announced 225 metres) at Whites Cross, a short distance north of Cork city and in November 1982 the studios and FM transmitter were transferred to their new base at Whites Cross. Like South Coast Radio ERI employed a team of professional, experienced local and foreign broadcasters and used professional grade equipment including sophisticated audio processing. American made jingles were introduced and the station went from strength to strength adding a high power FM stereo signal in early 1983 (initially 102, then 99/106/96.7/96.9 and finally 97.7 MHz) and its huge reach gave the station a big advantage over its competitors. It built new customised studios in 1986 at Whites Cross, had offices in St Patrick St and later South Mall.

Similar to South Coast Radio, ERI suffered from various set backs including jamming, the unauthorised felling of its transmitter mast over Christmas 1983. In 1986, following a court order, its transmission facilities had to be relocated including the large transmitter tower to Hollyhill, just beyond the city's perimeter. The studios remained at Whites Cross linked to the transmitters via a microwave link. A little later it had to cease FM transmissions following complaints from the national broadcaster. It continued on 1305 kHz AM during this time. It returned to FM after approximately one month on a new frequency 97.7 MHz.

Despite these setbacks, ERI remained on air until 30/12/1988 and was highly successful. Many of its staff went on to work in local and national radio and television. ERI unsuccessfully applied for a commercial licence for Cork city and county in 1989 under the name Sound of the South. Subsequently, its studio and transmission facilities were leased to a new licensed station, Radio South, in 1989, allowing this new station to be operational relatively quickly. Radio South was relaunched in July 1990 as 96FM and eventually bought out by County Sound in February 1991, with the original four shareholders selling all their shares to the Mallow-based station.

== Other versions of South Coast Radio ==
South Coast Radio 102.3 MHz FM (mono). Operated from North Main Street from mid 1985 to mid 1986 approx.

South Coast Radio 102.3/104 MHz FM Stereo Marlboro Street Mid 1986 -late 1986.

South Coast Radio 98.5 MHz FM Stereo (evolved from WBEN Cork (see below)) 1988.

== Sunshine Radio (Cork) ==
Sunshine Radio (also Radio Sunshine) began in the late summer, autumn of 1985. It was based at the former Cameo Cinema premises at Military Hill. It operated on an announced 243 metres medium wave and 95.8 FM (mono). The medium wave transmitter was a few hundred watts and of good quality.

The owner initially intended running the station on a quasi commercial basis and opted for a mixed pop oldies, country and Irish format. However the medium wave transmitter failed after a couple of months after an attempt to upgrade the antenna. The station abandoned its attempts to attract advertising and continued using its modest power FM transmitter.

Most of its presenters left for other stations and the station operated with limited hours with a specific focus on Country and Irish.

Later it began broadcasting around the clock using taped programmes preprepared by a small number of volunteer presenters, featuring, in the main, popular music + daily mid morning live country and Irish programmes.

The station remained on air until the new legislation came into force at the end of 1988.

Sunshine Radio returned later in the mid 1990s on a part-time basis to FM (see below), exclusively adopting a country and Irish format.

== WBEN (Cork) ==
WBEN (Cork) began broadcasting on 98FM from Cook Street, Cork over the Jazz weekend, October 1985. Initially it specialised in nonstop music from the American Billboard charts. It carried a limited amount of local advertising.

In early summer 1986, the format was relaxed to include popular music from the UK in addition to American releases, presenters were introduced and the station began broadcasting on medium wave (1386 kHz) in parallel to FM. FM coverage was expanded during this time.

In late 1986 further changes were made. Most of the original line up departed and others came on board along with a further watering down of the American format and the introduction of a late-night phone-in show. The station ceased broadcasting on medium wave.

Later, a more powerful FM transmitter was installed, and the station changed its name to South Coast Radio.

WBEN moved to Washington Street and eventually Togher.

It continued as South Coast Radio until it closed on 31/12/1988.

== Centre Radio (Cork) ==
Centre Radio began life as Leeside Sound with transmissions beginning in late 1985 on 101.5 MHz FM from a premises on the North Mall, in the city centre. The station broadcast a mixture of popular chart, Irish, Country and big band Jazz. The station used a stereo CTE 250W transmitter located at the same premises as the studio.

By mid 1986, the station was struggling to sell advertising. The owners decided to move the station to higher ground at Shandon Street, change the frequency slightly to 101 MHz and relaunch as Centre Radio with a UK jingle package cut for local purposes. Most of the Irish and other specialist shows were dropped and a tighter top 40 format was introduced.

With improved coverage, more professional presenters and the new format advertising began to flow into the station.

However, by Christmas 1987, the station ran into further difficulties and closed.

Centre Radio re-emerged later in September 1988 from a new location (Dublin Hill) and a new frequency (95FM) and broadcast until 30 December 1988 when it closed down to comply with new legislation.

Centre Radio unsuccessfully applied for a Cork city/East Cork radio licence to the IRTC in 1989 losing out to a group backed by 4 ex Cork Examiner newspaper journalists. The new group commenced legal broadcasting under the name Radio South on 10 August 1989.

== WKLR & NCCR ==
In County Cork, the two most significant stations during the 1980s were the Bandon-based WKLR, and NCCR (North Cork Community Radio), which broadcast from the old Majestic Ballroom in Mallow. WKLR (West Cork Local Radio) founded in 1984, initially intended for the West Cork area, but towards the end of the station's life had extended its transmission to cover Cork city and much of the rest of Co. Cork. The close-down night of NCCR in Mallow on 31 December 1988, was struck by tragedy, when local farmer and former presenter and shareholder of the station - Pat O'Connor - who was participating in an interview - collapsed and died suddenly during a commercial break. The station immediately announced it was closing earlier than planned "due to unforeseen circumstances". Pat O'Connor had also been a brief national celebrity when he was chosen as a representative of rural Ireland to guest present an edition of the 'Saturday Live' chat show on RTÉ TV in 1987, however his RTÉ appearance meant he had to resign his involvement in the pirate NCCR to avoid controversy beforehand, and did not appear again until the closedown night. NCCR had come into being in 1985 when a community co-operative took over the ownership of a previous station – NCLR (North Cork Local Radio) that had been in existence since 1981.

== Radio Caroline ==
Radio Caroline Cork was launched on 22 May 1981 broadcasting from a ground-floor apartment in Togher on the southside on 98.8 FM. It moved in 1982 to an upstairs studio in Cornmarket Street for a few weeks before returning to a mobile home studio based in Togher.

A Medium Wave transmitter was added on 1188 kHz/253m in October 1982, later changing to 1557 kHz/192m (announced 194 metres). Output was expanded to 7 days a week 8am -6pm and new presenters were recruited.

A lot of well-known names in Irish and Cork broadcasting passed through its studio doors over the years, moving on later to careers on local, national radio and TV. Radio Caroline ceased regular broadcasting in mid 1985 but appeared occasionally on 1557 kHz AM/98.8(v)FM in the latter half of 1985, during 1986 and into 1987.

== 1989 and early to mid 1990s ==
After 31/12/1988 and into the early 1990s there was relatively little pirate radio activity in Cork with a few notable exceptions. Cork City Radio 1521 kHz MW (low power, irregular), County Sound Radio 102.0 (v)(FM) - (part time, low power, irregular 1989), Lighthouse Radio 98.2/97.6/97.8FM (1992 -1997), Radio Blackstar 101FM (1992), PowerFM 98.3/94.8/95.4 FM (1992 -1997) and in the East Cork area Radio Midleton. Other stations which followed included Crystal Radio 98.3, City View Radio 99/103FM and, a little later, Sunshine Radio, a 1980s pirate relaunched on 104.8FM, Radio Harmony 94.8FM and the first Cork based Club FM. All these stations were part-time, hobby operations. Also active during this time were relays of UK based satellite radio station UCB.

During this era, many of the hobby stations cooperated, assisting each other with technical matters. They experimented with antennas, compression, stereo and later RDS. None carried advertising. In general they had little commitment to listeners and were run for fun. Pirate radio in Cork had come full circle after the professional era and returned to the underground.

In this much changed pirate radio landscape Radio Caroline Cork resumed broadcasting on a part-time basis in the early- mid 1990s on 99.2FM and later 98.2, 106.4 and finally 107.0FM. It remained on 107.0FM at weekends until operations ceased permanently in March 2025.

In late 1995 the hobby scene was shaken up by the launch of Radio Friendly. Further larger stations followed focusing on youth culture and dance music, styles largely ignored by the 1990s hobby pirates. The arrival of Radio Friendly et al marked a generational change and a whole new era. See sections below for further details.

== Community Radio Youghal ==
Another pirate station was Community Radio Youghal (CRY), whose existence was ironically inspired by a stint in the town of RTÉ's mobile community radio station, which provided temporary community radio services during visits to dozens of towns nationwide in the 1980s. CRY had been on air for almost a decade and was one of the longest surviving pirate stations in Ireland when it closed at the end of 1988. CRY returned to the airwaves 7 years later in 1995 with a license, currently broadcasting on 104.0 MHz to Youghal town and surrounding areas from a 25-Watt transmitter located on the town's water tower at Cork Hill.

== Radio Friendly ==
In autumn 1995, Radio Friendly commenced broadcasting to Cork city on 104.3FM. This station provided music from "underground" DJs, some from Sir Henry's nightclub, and its DJs included Stevie G and Greg & Shane of Fish Go Deep. The station got its name from its owners: MR P, Miss Ken D and some DJs from Dublin's Power FM. The transmitter was the original Power 98.7FM equipment. A stereo encoder, audio compressor and a change of frequency to 104.6FM were among the improvements carried out early on. In 1997 the transmitter was moved to higher ground giving much improved coverage and slightly later a professional audio processor was installed. The station moved to 104.0FM in late 2001, until its closure in 2003. Radio Friendly won the Best Irish Dance Station Award, beating all national stations at the Smirnoff Irish Dance awards.

== Kiss 105.5 FM ==
Another big station in the late 1990s and early 2000s was Kiss 105.5FM, which had a more commercial side than Radio Friendly and was aimed at a younger audience. DJs such as Colin Edwards, Damien Sreenan, Dave Newman, and Derek O Keefe were regulars on this until the station's closure in 2001. Kiss actually first appeared on 105.3FM, but moved to 105.5 some months later after they extended coverage. They later introduced another transmitter for the northern Cork area on 107.1, lasting until it broke down.

== Kiss 106.5/94.8/87.8/88.7/104.9 ==
Kiss (previously called NRG 2003-04) started on 106.5 in April 2004 by Pete O'Neill, who also owned NRG and was fronted by Colin Edwards. It was on air for over 6 months until it was raided. Kiss was very popular among younger audiences. One reason for this was the large Max Power Event that was advertised on the station, attracting hundreds of cars and thousands of people. However, a car crash near Douglas was attributed to the station, leading to its closure. The Evening Echo carried the story on 2 pages, causing concern among other stations. As a result, presenters from other stations complained from a ratings perspective, leading to a switch in frequencies.

This was the main pirate station in Cork and was more known on Kiss 94.8, but they were the subject of much Comreg attention and had been raided three times having broadcasting equipment confiscated. The station also featured many local big DJs. In 2007 the owner of Kiss launched a second station Play 87.7FM which broadcast house, techno & trance music and remained on air for a year. A 2008 relaunch of Kiss 94.8 lasted only 3 weeks with the station being raided once again (13 August 2008 13:00) and all equipment was confiscated while off air. Kiss FM was also subject to a raid while DJ’s were performing a switch-over of shows. This was at an outdoor broadcast from Funderland where Kiss were subject to three-studios (two on-site and one outdoor).

Kiss made another return to 88.7 for 2 months but closed due to the fact that they were joining with another station, NRG887. They then separated, and the old Kiss members surprisingly made a return once again on 24 June 2012 to the airwaves on 104.9 MHz for a period of time before suddenly disappearing from the airwaves on 1 November 2013 and has not reappeared since.as of July.2026 KissFM is back on 104.9FM Broadcasting.(weekends only) this Radio station is owned and operated by Shaun (DJ Midge) all previous operators have long ceased Pirate radio!

== NRG 88.7 FM ==
NRG 88.7MHZ Tied from the old NRG 106.5 and Kiss 106.5/94.8 and linked with the owners of the old Pulse 106.5 & Galaxy FM (Francis Hennessy) to create NRG 88.7MHZ. Later the Kiss owner (Pete O Neil) separated and once again brought Kiss FM back to the airwaves on 104.9FM, while NRG was still being run on 88.7Mhz by the old Pulse & Galaxy Fm owner but was on and off the air due to equipment issues.

== Radio NOW 87.8FM ==
Radio NOW was an influential underground radio station that broadcast nonstop HD&T (House, Dance, and Trance) on 87.8 FM, reaching Cork city and its surrounding suburbs. The station was founded by Cork DJ Steve O’C, who expanded his passion for music beyond the decks and into the airwaves.

During its final year, Radio NOW gained additional momentum through its popular club nights at the Roxy nightclub’s (Audio Rooms) However, both the Roxy nightclub and Radio NOW came to an end in May/ June 2013, marking the close of the station’s two-year journey.

At its peak, Radio NOW hosted a collective of up to 25 DJs, offering a blend of genres including house, dance, trance, techno, drum and bass, R’n’B, hip hop, and dubstep. It left a large impression on Cork’s underground music scene as a hub for diverse sounds.

== FusionRadio ==
FusionRadio was an unlicensed pirate radio station broadcasting on 88.7 MHz FM (early 2013) and subsequently 87.5 MHz FM (2013–2015) from the Knockaneeny area of Cork, Ireland. Founded and operated by Jay Mazz (DJ Mazz) — previously part-manager and technical operator for Cork pirate stations NRG FM and Pulse FM — the station took over the former studio facility of Radio Now 87.8 FM following its closure in early 2013.

Originally launched under the working title Flirt FM, the station was required to rebrand prior to broadcast after receiving notification from the licensed community station Flirt FM in Galway. It commenced broadcasting in early 2013 on 88.7 MHz FM, but relocated to 87.5 MHz FM after that frequency was allocated to a licensed operator. Using professional broadcasting equipment and transmitting at an effective radiated power of 300 to 1,000 watts, the station operated for approximately two-and-a-half years without enforcement action or inspection by ComReg. FusionRadio was run on a strictly non-profit, non-commercial basis and carried no advertising or sponsorship. The station also streamed live online throughout its existence, with reception reported across County Cork and into parts of County Waterford and County Tipperary.

FusionRadio introduced a distinctive programming concept to Cork pirate radio, combining commercial and underground dance music styles within a single schedule. The station's music spanned funk, reggae, house, techno, trance, drum and bass, R&B, and hip hop. Its slogan was "It's All About The Music". FusionRadio was among the first pirate stations in Ireland to feature a single female voice for all station imaging and jingles, provided by voice artist Philippa Collins (formerly of the Galaxy FM network), with imaging produced and edited by Jay Mazz.

Key presenters included Jay Mazz (HouseBox Radio Show), Hammy Hamilton (The House Factory), Smiley, Dario Russo (Italian House), Shane Miller (Digital Revolution) ,Johnny Nason (Trance-Fusion), Michael P. Stropek (Techno), Donal Keohane ,Tony C (Urban Rhythms), Brendan Muraku, Martin "Smurf" Murphy, Brody Gallagher, Chrissy Connors, DJ Jugzy, Brian Moloney, DJ Sixco, DJ Gwada Mike & Tricky Rom, alongside Aaron L, Adam Dunbar and Ed Dunlea (Deep South Sounds), and a broad roster of additional local DJs.

== FreakFM 105.2 ==
FreakFM began in Mallow, North Cork in 2000 before moving to Cork city in early 2001. Music was a mix of Indie Rock, alternative and metal. The station closed down after a few months. In 2004, the station began broadcasting again from a city center studio and programming was much more diverse than the original FreakFM format. Rock, Metal, Indie, Soul, Funk, Reggae, and eclectic were some of the genres of shows. The station continued until December 2005, when Comreg raided two of the transmitter sites, the main studio was not raided, and the station continued for 1 more week until permanent shutdown 31 December 2005.

== Pastime urban pirates ==
- Radio Caroline Cork (1981–2025)
- 88.7/87.5 FusionRadio (2013–2015)
- 94.8 Powerfm [1990s]
- 97.8 Lighthouse Radio (1992 -1997)
- 98.2 The Secret Service (1999 -2001)
- 100.6 Heat FM [2004]
- 101.5 Buzz FM [2003–2005]
- 101.5 Fresh FM [2005]
- 101.5 Static FM [2006]
- 101.5 Rush FM [2006]
- 106.5 LUV FM (1999–2001)
- 106.5 MIX FM (2001–2003)
- 102.3 Vintage FM [2002]
- 104.0 klub FM [1999–2001]
- 104.4 klub FM [2001–2005]
- 104.0 x-FM (formerly klub) [2005–2006]
- 104.0 klub FM [2006–2009]
- 104.6 Radio Friendly [1996–2001]
- 104.0 Radio Friendly [2001–2002]
- 106.4 Radio Bandon (2005 -2009)
- 106.4/106.9 ELEKTRA, Bandon (2016, 2024)
- 1512 kHz MW ELEKTRA AM (2021)
- 106.8 K.2. [1996–1999]
- 105.5 Kiss FM [1999-2001]
- 107.1 Kiss FM [2000?] North Cork transmitter of the above Kiss FM
- 106.7 Liquid Radio [May 2011]
- 105.0 Galaxy [1 Month 2006]
- 106.5 Nrg FM [2003] became Kiss FM (April 2004)
- 106.5 Kiss FM [2004–2006]
- 94.8 Kiss FM [2006–2008]
- 87.7 Play FM (2007) Affiliated to Kiss FM
- 87.8 Kiss FM [2009]
- 88.7 Kiss FM (2009–2011)
- 104.9 Kiss FM (2012 – 1 Nov 2013)
- 95.5 Pulse FM [2005–2007]
- 106.5 Pulse FM [2007–2008]
- 105.2 Freak FM [2004]
- 106.5 Spin FM [2006]
- 106.5 Heat FM [2006]
- 107.4 BPM [2004]
- 107.4 Fresh FM [2005]
- 107.4 Galaxy [2004 - 2005]
- 107.4 Tech FM [2006]
- 107.5 Spin FM [2006]
- 107.5 Phantom [2007]
- 87.7 Sub FM [2005 - 2006]
- 87.7 Heat FM [2006]
- 93.1 Heat FM [2004 - 2005]
- 94.8 Tech FM [2003]
- 105.2 Dream FM [2006 - 2007] Station in Clonakilty
- 93.3 Touch FM [2007]
- 104.0 Rush FM [2007]
- 104.0 Klub FM [2000– ?]
- 104.2 Klub FM [2000–2007]
- 94.8 Club FM [1999–2000]
- 105.2 Vibe FM [2007]
- 101.5 Storm FM [2007]
- 97.4 Galaxy-FM [2008 - 2009]
- 100.5 Galaxy-FM [2009]
- 87.8 Galaxy-FM [2009]
- 88.7 Galaxy-FM (2011–2012)
- 88.7 Ice-FM (2011)
- 100.5 Buzz-FM (2011)
- 88.9 Kiss-FM (2011)
- 87.8 Radio NOW (2011–2013)
- 104.9 Kiss-FM (2012–2014)
- 104.9 JAMM FM (2012)
- 88.7/87.5 FusionRadio (2013–2015)
- 104.9 DHR (2015–2017)
- 87.8 Klub FM (2013–2015)
- 87.5 Klub FM (2015–2018)
- 87.8 Play 87.8 (2018–2019)
- 87.8/87.5 Klub FM (2012 - 2018)
- 87.8 TRUE Radio (2017–2020)
- 87.5 Power 87 (2018–2021)

== See also ==
- Irish pirate radio
