= Galway Bay FM =

Radio station in Galway, Ireland

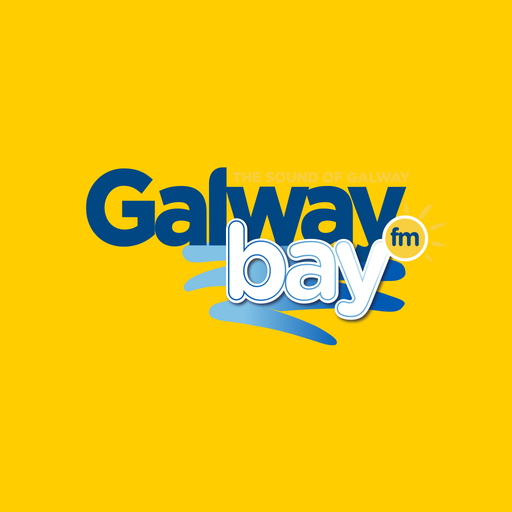
- Galway; Ireland
- Frequencies: 95.8 MHz-Galway City & Clifden, 97.4 MHz-East Galway, Connemara & Aran Islands, 97.2 MHz-Gort Area, 96.8 MHz-County Galway
- RDS: G BAY FM

Programming
- Languages: English; Irish

Ownership
- Owner: Bay Broadcasting

History
- Founded: 1989; 37 years ago
- Former names: Radio West

Links
- Website: www.galwaybayfm.ie

Galway Bay FM is an Irish independent local radio station and operates under a licence from Coimisiún na Meán. Established in 1989, the station broadcasts from studios in Galway, serving the city and County Galway.

== Programming ==
The programming format is a mixture of music, news, sport, current affairs and local issues. Programmes are generally in English, although the station features some Irish language programmes. There is an opt-out service with alternative programming for Galway city on weekday evenings using the 95.8 MHz frequency.

== History ==
The station was originally launched as Radio West in 1989 and was the first legal local radio station in Galway. Radio West changed its name to Galway Bay FM in 1993.

In 2006, the Connacht Tribune newspaper bought the station outright, having previously owned 27% of it.

In 2024 Galway Bay FM had the largest market share of listeners in County Galway at 23%, with 115,000 weekly listeners. This was four percentage points ahead of RTÉ Radio 1 and Today FM.

In June 2025, it was announced that the station had been sold to Bay Broadcasting Limited, owners of Ireland’s Classic Hits Radio in an estimated seven figure deal. The acquisition was completed on 17 October 2025.

== Alumni ==
- Gareth O'Callaghan (RTÉ 2fm, 4fm)
- Adrian Lydon (RTÉ News and Current Affairs)
- Marc Roberts
- Keith Cunningham (Today FM, RedFM)
