= Pirate radio in Limerick =

Unlicensed radio stations in Limerick

Limerick has had a number of pirate radio stations over the years; however, not many of these have had sufficient longevity to make a significant impact.

The biggest radio stations in the region from the late 70s to mid-80s were Raidio Luimni (8 years), www.BigLradiolimerick.com (7 years), Hits 954. (3 years) and RLWE (Radio Limerick Weekly Echo) (6 months). Currently on air 88.1 fm (Caherdavin area)

Other reasonably-significant radio stations in the area over the years included Independent Radio Limerick, CCR (City Centre Radio), Radio Vera, Radio Munster, SoundChannel and Mid-West Radio (a name since adopted somewhat confusingly by a legal radio station in Mayo, in the West of Ireland).

Following the biggest closedown of the pirates in Ireland in 1988, and the subsequent legalisation of local radio services in the country, many people viewed that the pirate era was consigned to the past, and Limerick became home to a single government-licensed service called Radio Limerick One which ironically later had its broadcasting licence revoked only to continue operating as a pirate station (RLO) for 10 years, being constantly raided and fined, finally ceasing transmission after 10 years early 2007 as owners and engineers ventured to other projects.

The inexplicable failure to offer more choice - Limerick had initially been earmarked for at least two stations - meant that inevitably a number of pirate stations reappeared, the biggest ones being Kiss FM, Radio Magic 107.6FM, Galtee Radio, Country Gold, Estuary, NCW 106, and Wave FM, which later became Galaxy 105. There were also all-too-brief appearances of Q101, Power 98FM, Club FM, Fresh 103 and Enterprise Radio.

In 2009, Radio-Filou has been broadcasting for a year and has catered for listeners from the alternative audience, sharing content with Rascal Radio in Galway. Public interest started to grow in both stations, but eventually the limerick branch disappeared and the Galway Studio was subject to a raid.

== See also ==
- Irish pirate radio
