= Joe Harrington (broadcaster) =

Irish radio presenter

- Born: Joseph Harrington; Dublin, County Dublin, Ireland
- Occupations: Broadcaster and General Manager
- Years active: 1989–present
- Notable credit(s): FM104; East Coast FM (1994–2011); Sunshine 106.8 (2004–Present)

Joe Harrington is an Irish presenter of radio employed by Dublin's Sunshine 106.8. He is a multi nominated award-winning broadcaster who has vast experience in radio programming and management. His brother Paul Harrington won the Eurovision Song Contest 1994. He co-wrote a number of tracks on the Paul Harrington album What I'd Say. The album entered the Irish charts in the early nineties.

== Career ==
He worked as a presenter with Ireland's first Independent National Broadcaster Century Radio, he then worked with Dublin's Rock 104 and subsequently FM104, he joined East Coast FM in 1994 as Head of Music and then became Programme Controller, a position he held until 2011.

In 2009, he joined with his brothers as "The Harrington Brothers" to record Molly Malone with The Official Leinster Supporters Group and the song became the Official Anthem for The Leinster Rugby Team. The song Molly Malone entered the Irish Charts in 2009 and was number one in the download charts. The Harrington Brothers performed Molly Malone live at The RDS Dublin just before Leinster played Edinburgh in the Heiniken Cup.

Harrington is a multi IMRO Radio Award Nominee and in 2006 won the much coveted award for his lunch-time programme. He was nominated again in 2008 for his Drive Time. Show. He was also nominated for Best Music Presenter 2014 in The important ' People Awards for the 2014 PPI Radio Awards. He was the first and only person to present a weekly programme dedicated to Elvis Presley on a National Radio Station ( Century Radio ) He also presented Elvis Extra which was one of the longest running programmes on Dublin's Sunshine 106.8

In 2011, Harrington was appointed General Manager of Dublin's Sunshine 106.8 to coincide with the station's new brand and programming. He also presents Mellow Moments Monday to Friday 7pm-1am.and Sunshine Gold every Sunday 9am-3pm.

In late 2016, Sunshine 106.8 in association with Sony Music Ireland, released an album entitled 'Sunshine presents Mellow Moments' 16 relaxing mellow songs selected from the show Mellow Moments presented by Joe Harrington.
