= Dairena Ní Chinnéide =

Irish poet

- Education: Dublin City University
- Occupations: Poet; broadcast journalist
- Writing career
- Language: Irish; English

Dairena Ní Chinnéide is an Irish poet and former broadcast journalist, interpreter and television producer. She has published 12 books of mainly bilingual poetry in Irish and one in English, titled 'deleted', published by Sam Harper One of her better known poems is Jeaic ar Scoil. She has received several awards for her writing, including from The Patrick and Katherine Kavanagh Fellowship, The Arts Council of Ireland and Éalaíon na Gaeltachta Literature Awards. She was nominated Poet Laureate for Listowel during the Poetry Ireland initiative, Poetrytown 2021.

== Biography ==
Ní Chinnéide is from the Dingle Peninsula, County Kerry. She graduated from Dublin City University in 1989 with a degree in Communications studies. After working at Radio Kerry, she joined Century Radio. She was the final voice heard on Century Radio before it closed in November 1991. She moved back to Kerry to work at RTÉ Raidió na Gaeltachta.

Ní Chinnéide's first book of poetry was published by Cló Iar-Chonnachta in 2005. Her work, deleted, published by Salmon Poetry (2019) was her first poetry collection written and published in English.

Ní Chinnidéide was appointed writer-in-residence at Dublin City University for the 2017-2018 year.

== Selected works ==
Ní Chinnéide's works include:

- An Trodaí & Dánta Eile/The Warrior & Other Poems, 2006
- Máthair an Fhiaigh/The Raven's Mother, 2008
- An tEachtrannach/Das Fremde/The Stranger, 2008
- Pol na mBabies, 2008
- Bleachtaire na Seirce, 2011
- Cloithear Aistear Anama, Coiscéim, 2013
- Labhraíonn Fungie/Fungie Speaks, 2015
- Fé Gheasa/Spellbound, 2016
- Tairseach, Éabhlóid, 2021
- Cinnlínte, Breaking Verse, 2022
