= Glounthaune =

Village by Cork Harbour, Ireland

Glounthaune Gleanntán
- Village
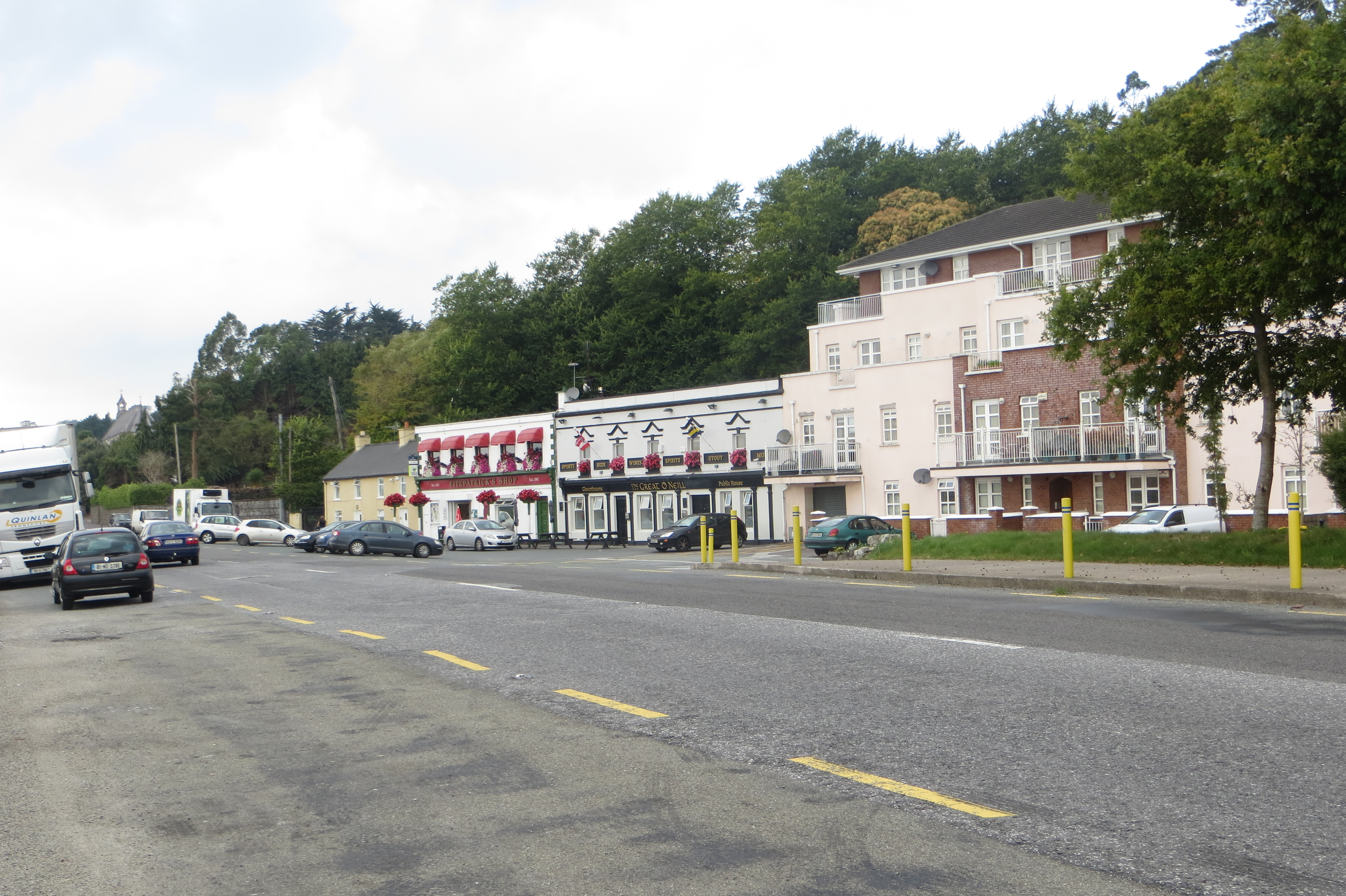
- Glounthaune village

- Location in Ireland
- Coordinates: 51°54′43″N 8°19′59″W
- Country: Ireland
- Province: Munster
- County: County Cork
- Time zone: UTC+0 (WET)
  - Summer (DST): UTC-1 (IST (WEST))
- Irish Grid Reference: W769734

Glounthaune (Irish: An Gleanntán, meaning 'the small glen') is a village in County Cork, Ireland, some 7 kilometres (4.3 mi) east of Cork city, on the north shore of Cork Harbour, the estuary of the River Lee.

== History ==
The village, originally named "New Glanmire", was built as a planned town on a tidal quay wall between 1810 and 1819. A new school was built in the 1820s. The current Catholic church, built c. 1880, replaced an earlier chapel which had been built in 1803.

In 1842, Glounthaune landowner William O'Connor built a castellated neo-Gothic stone tower to commemorate the teetotalist and abolitionist Father Theobald Mathew on what was then called Mount Patrick and is now known as Tower Hill in Glounthaune. The tower is still standing and has since been converted into a private residence while retaining many of its original features including a life-sized statue of Father Mathew. The refurbished and modernised tower was sold in 2014.

== Transport ==
Glounthaune railway station opened in 1859. It is served by the commuter railway line between Cork and Cobh. The next station in the Cork direction is Little Island, while towards Cobh the next stop is at Fota Island. With the reopening, in 2009, of the railway line to Midleton, Glounthaune railway station became the junction between the Cobh and Midleton lines.

== Sport ==
The parish of Glounthaune is the main base for Gaelic Athletic Association club Erin's Own GAA. Erin's Own won the Cork Senior Hurling Championship on three occasions: in 1992, 2006 (defeating Cloyne) and 2007 (defeating Newtownshandrum). Association football (soccer) is also played in Glounthaune, with Glounthaune United A.F.C. fielding teams in the Cork Schoolboys League.

Knockraha Badminton Club train in Glouthaune in Erin's Own GAA hall.

== People ==
- Cathal Coughlan (d. 2022), singer-songwriter
- Brian Corcoran, inter-county hurler and footballer
- Tomás O'Leary, Munster and Ireland rugby player
- Denzil Lacey, broadcaster

== See also ==
- Metropolitan Cork
