= Pirate radio in Kerry =

Pirate radio activity in County Kerry, Ireland

County Kerry has had a long history of pirate radio. One of the first pirate radio stations was set up by Michael Donovan in the early 1970s; it was called Radio Tralee and first broadcast on AM. It was later reestablished as Kerry Local Radio (KLR) and broadcast on FM. Many other pirate stations have broadcast in Kerry over the years.

The following is a list of some of the pirate stations that broadcast in Kerry at some stage (not exhaustive):

Kerry pirate radio stations

- Radio Tralee (Tralee) ??AM (1970s)
- Kerry Local Radio (Tralee) ??FM (various frequencies in the 1980s) (104FM temporarily in 1993)
- Kerry Community Radio - KCR (Tralee) 99FM (1982 to 1986)
- Radio Phoenix (Tralee) ??FM (mid 1980s)
- WRKY Rocky 103 (Killarney in 1983 to 1986) Listowel (1987 to 1988) 99FM 103FM 104FM [Big L remnants, Mike Richardson]
- Horizon Radio (Killorglin in 1986) (Banna in 1987) 97FM 99FM 104FM [also remnants of Limerick's 'Big L' as Mike Richardson]
- Southwest Radio (Killarney) 97.7FM 99.7FM 103.3FM 104FM 105FM (all 20 Watts ERP each) (according to their engineer Basil Hendrix)
- Radio 101 (Killorglin / Caragh Lake in 1984-1986) 101FM (25 W ERP) and 7360AM (1kW ERP) [relaying WRKY 1986 on Sundays on shortwave]
- MRL - Music Radio Listowel (Listowel) 99FM (30 Watts ERP)(1987 to 1988)
- Kingdom 102 (Killarney) 102FM (3000 Watts ERP)(1987 to 1988)
- Sunshine 106 (Tralee) 106.5FM (short-lived) (1992)
- Shannonside Local Radio (Causeway) 104FM (short-lived) (1988)
- Ballinaskellings Radio 105FM (late 1980s)
- Coast 103 (Tralee) 106.5FM 103FM (short-lived) (1993)
- UCB Europe (Tralee) 106.5FM (relay service) (1999 to 2005)
- UCB Europe (Killarney area relay) 105.0 and previously 98.0 (late 1990s to around 2005)
- Dance Radio (Tralee) 104.2FM (late 1990s)
- Beat FM (Tralee) 104.7FM (2000 to 2006) Originally 106FM then 104FM in 2000 and changed to 104.7 in 2002 (100 Watts). Moved up 0.1 to 104.8 in 2009 (due to '4FM' presence on 104.6)
- DAG FM (Tralee) 105.5FM (2009) Founded in June 2009
- PARADISE FM (Killorglin) 87.7FM (100 Watts ERP)(summer 2020 + 2021, operated by former members of Radio 101; web site: http://paradise-fm.de-d.de )

?? means information not available

Pirate stations from outside Kerry that could be received in Kerry:

- WCR (Abbeyfeale) 96.2FM-Tralee(30W) 96FM-Mallow(50W) 98FM 101.3FM-Abbeyfeale(1000W) (late 1980s)
- ERI (Cork) ??AM (10,000W) (FM signal not received in Kerry) (mid to late 1980s)
- South Coast Radio (Cork) ??AM (5,000W) (FM signal not received in Kerry) (mid to late 1980s)
- Radio Vera (Limerick) 97FM (5000W ERP) [Big L remnants] (1988)
- 106.4 Pirate FM milltown county kerry 2006-2008

== See also ==
- Irish pirate radio
