= Nova TV (Ireland) =

- Country: Ireland
- Broadcast area: Dublin
- Headquarters: Dublin

Programming
- Language: English
- Picture format: 576i (4:3 SDTV)

Ownership
- Owner: Radio Nova

History
- Launched: December 4, 1983; 42 years ago
- Closed: December 6, 1983; 42 years ago

Availability

Terrestrial
- UHF analog: Channel 60

Nova TV was one of the several pirate television stations set up in Ireland at the time of RTÉ's television monopoly, being owned by Radio Nova. The station conducted test broadcasts in December 1983 and subsequently closed down after pressure from RTÉ.

== History ==
Radio Nova started experimental television broadcasts in early December 1983 on UHF channel 66, using Mike Hogan's bedroom as a television studio. A video camera was connected to a video cassette recorder which, in turn, was sent to the link transmitter. Test transmissions were underway from 4 December 1983, this time on UHF channel 60. It was scheduled that the station would start a full service by Christmas, consisting of chat shows, game shows, music and films, pending on the budget available. The initial hours of broadcasting were from 6pm to 2am, with additional franchises for breakfast television and an Irish Gaelic afternoon service. NTV started with a staff of 20, which was set to quickly expand to 100. This led to the opening of job vacancies for various fields. The station operated on a 15-mile radius and forbade the broadcast of pornographic and video nasty horror films, while not infringing copyright laws. An RTÉ spokesman had shown its disapproval of commercial radio and television, while Chris Cary described NTV as an "experiment in local television", after similar local radio experiments. A further test transmission was held on 5 December at 9pm; providing details on how to improve its reception.

Pressure from both the government and RTÉ led to Cary's decision to close the station on the morning of 6 December, until further notice. The suspension became permanent when Nova Radio and Nova TV were raided on 9 December with its equipment worth £170,000 being taken away from the premises. It was believed that the television transmitter left unused by Cary was taken over by Northern Irish businessmen.
