= Michael Reade =

Irish broadcaster and journalist (1965 or 1966 – 2024)

Michael Reade (1965 or 1966 – 21 October 2024) was an Irish broadcaster and journalist with the LMFM news radio network, broadcast throughout the counties of Louth, Meath, parts of Ulster, and other surrounding parts of Leinster.

== Life and career ==
Reade was born in Dublin, Ireland. For 21 years he presented "The Mike Reade Show" on the LMFM Radio Network a discussion on current affairs running from Monday-Friday. In October 2024 he won the IMRO Gold Radio Award for best Current Affairs Broadcasting on Local Radio. He started work in radio at the age of 15.

Reade publicly revealed his diagnosis with cancer on a radio broadcast in September 2024, which attracted national attention for advocacy in advancing the cause of those with terminal illness. He died from the disease on 21 October 2024, at the age of 58.
