= Tony Fenton =

Irish radio presenter (1961–2015)

- Born: Anthony James Fagan; 25 March 1961; Glasnevin, Dublin, Ireland
- Died: 12 March 2015 (aged 53); Dublin, Ireland
- Resting place: Glasnevin Cemetery
- Occupation: Radio presenter
- Known for: Wall of Sound

Tony Fenton (born Anthony James Fagan; 25 March 1961 – 12 March 2015) was an Irish radio presenter and DJ. For 18 years until he left in 2003, he worked with RTÉ 2fm; then joined Today FM in 2004, where he worked until his death 11 years later.

Fenton won Music Broadcaster of the Year at the 2008 PPI Radio Awards. He also appeared on television, including a 2007 guest appearance on The Panel, plus a four stars from five meal cooked on The Restaurant.

Fenton was "one of Ireland's favourite pop DJs". Louis Walsh described him as one of "the kings of Irish broadcasting".

== Early life ==
Fenton grew up in Glasnevin, wanting to become a radio presenter from a young age. Aged deep within his early teens he would listen to the pioneers of commercial radio on stations such as Radio Luxembourg, Radio Caroline and BBC Radio 1.

On completion of his education, Fenton began an apprenticeship as a carpenter in his father's building company. During this time he set up as a mobile DJ with friend Barry Lang doing birthday parties at weekends, their first gig being at the local scout hall. Later, Ian Dempsey joined the duo and they travelled all over Dublin spinning vinyl at various weddings and birthday parties. Fenton noticed an advertisement by his local pirate station Alternative Radio Dublin (ARD) who were searching for some new "jocks".

He was also involved in soccer in his early years, playing alongside Ronnie Whelan at Home Farm.

== Career ==
In 1979, ARD employed him in his first radio job after a number of approaches. His prominence in local radio led to attention from the more powerful pirate stations. Throughout the early 1980s, Fenton was pursued by Dublin's growing radio industry. During this time he moved from ARD to Sunshine Radio and onto Radio Nova.

In 1985 Fenton returned to Ireland. RTÉ 2fm (then known as Radio 2) had begun in 1979 and were attracted to the vast audience Fenton had amassed while working with the pirates. During his early days with Radio 2 he helped grow the station's audience as presenter of a multitude of different shows throughout the schedule, including The Hotline.

Fenton left RTÉ 2fm in March 2003 to pursue other interests but, missing the buzz of radio, he joined national independent station Today FM in September 2004. There he was given a new lunchtime show to present. A revamp of the station which took place in November 2006 led to his show being moved to the 14:30 to 16:30 slot.

During his time there he interviewed many famous musicians. He later presented award-winning afternoon show broadcasts from 2.30pm to 4.30pm, Monday to Friday on Today FM, a music-driven show with features including "On This Day". Each day at 15:30, he played a downloadable tune as suggested by listeners. An archive of the chosen songs was then stored online.

== Personal life ==
Fenton was unmarried. He was a fan of Chelsea and owned an autographed football signed by the team.

In the summer of 2011, Fenton revealed that he had been battling prostate cancer. Just one month after losing his mother to cancer in October 2010, Fenton discovered what turned out to be a melanoma on his leg. Following treatment, the melanoma receded and he was given the all clear in March 2011. The cancer returned in May, however, and Fenton travelled to Germany for surgery. The surgery was a success and Fenton spent the remainder of his six-week break recuperating.

Fenton died on 11 March 2015, a fortnight before his 54th birthday, after succumbing to prostate cancer.

On 12 March 2015, the day after Fenton's death, Today FM's normal programming was subsequently suspended and all the DJs began playing various songs in tribute to Fenton with the National Lunchtime News on Today FM hosting a program where panelists spoke of their memories of Fenton while various nighttime DJs including Colm O'Sullivan and Paul McLoone carried on the tradition of playing the songs that Fenton had enjoyed listening to.

At 2.30 pm exactly on 16 March 2015, the day of his funeral, radio stations across the entire Republic of Ireland played the Aretha Franklin version of "I Say a Little Prayer" as a final mark of respect for Fenton.

On Friday 27 November 2015, "Whole Lotta Live", a CD composed of various sessions where musicians and bands had recorded numerous songs for programs on Today FM with the CD also dedicated to the memory of Fenton with all funds also going to the Irish Cancer Society was launched. That same day, over 100 musicians including members of the Irish bands, Ham Sandwich, The Minutes, Hudson Taylor and Delorentos gathered at Today FM in Dublin and at exactly at 1pm, performed a live version of U2's One in front of staff and personnel associated with Today FM, Newstalk and TXFM that was also broadcast on Today FM.

== Awards and nominations ==
Fenton received the Music Broadcaster of the Year Award at the 2008 PPI Radio Awards. He was nominated for the 2009 & 2010 Meteor Awards for Best Radio DJ — National at . He was inducted into the PPI Radio Hall of Fame.

Year	Nominee / work	Award	Result
2008	Tony Fenton	Music Broadcaster of the Year Award	Won
2009	""	Best Radio DJ — National	Nominated
2010	""	Best Radio DJ — National	Nominated
2011	""	PPI Music Broadcaster of the Year	Nominated
