= LMFM =

Radio station in Drogheda, Ireland

- Drogheda; Ireland
- Broadcast area: Counties Louth & Meath
- Frequencies: 95.5 MHz (Saggart); 95.8 MHz (Mount Oriel); 96.5 MHz (Athboy, Dundalk, Carlingford)

Programming
- Languages: English, Irish
- Format: AC/talk

Ownership
- Owner: News UK Broadcasting Ltd; (News UK)

History
- First air date: April 17, 1989

Links
- Website: lmfm.ie

LMFM is an independent local radio station based in Drogheda, Ireland. In terms of listenership, It is the largest radio station in Ireland outside of Dublin and Cork broadcasting to a population in excess of 300,000 adults. Media group UTV Media, now News Broadcasting, bought the station in a deal worth about €10 million in 2005.

LMFM broadcasts on a number of frequencies, the main being either 95.8FM or 95.5FM. The station is licensed by the Broadcasting Authority of Ireland to service both Counties Louth & Meath. The station also has a strong listenership in counties Dublin, Kildare, Cavan, Monaghan and Armagh in Northern Ireland. Its 95.5 MHz transmitter is notable significantly outside its franchise area, in County Dublin.

== History ==
LMFM came to be in 1989 with the awarding of a legal licence to cover the Louth/Meath area. This was obtained by Peter Govern with the assistance of the late Tom Savage of Carr Communications. Independent Media Broadcasting won the licence to provide the service. Most of the on-air staff they went on to hire such as Ray Stone, Eddie Caffrey, Daire Nelson, Dermot Finglas & Michael Gerrard were DJs from the pirate days of Radio Carousel, Telstar Radio and Boyneside Radio.

In 1997 LMFM attempted to attract a larger volume of listeners in the North Dublin & East Meath area by offering an opt-out station with studios in Clonee, County Meath. The new venture was called "Fresh 95.5FM".

LMFM was successful when it reapplied to keep its current licence in 2003 and was again awarded a licence to providing a radio service to the Louth/Meath area. LMFM is currently based in purpose studios in Drogheda, County Louth.

In 2009 it was the centre of controversy when a call-in programme discussed tensions in the Drogheda taxi industry between native Irish and immigrant African drivers. Kevin Faulkner of the Drogheda Taxi Drivers' Association complained about foreign drivers who "speak little English, don't know the geography of the area, have lost their photographic ID or claim it has been stolen" and that complaints could not be pursued because "they all look much the same to the general public." This led to protests outside the station by African drivers.

== People ==
- Mattie Kerrigan is an analyst with the station.
- Declan Byrne is an analyst with the station.
- Michael Reade a nationally respected journalist and broadcaster of the Michael Reade Show who died suddenly in 2024.
