= Athgoe =

Area of County Dublin, Ireland

Coordinates: 53°17′15″N 6°31′03″W

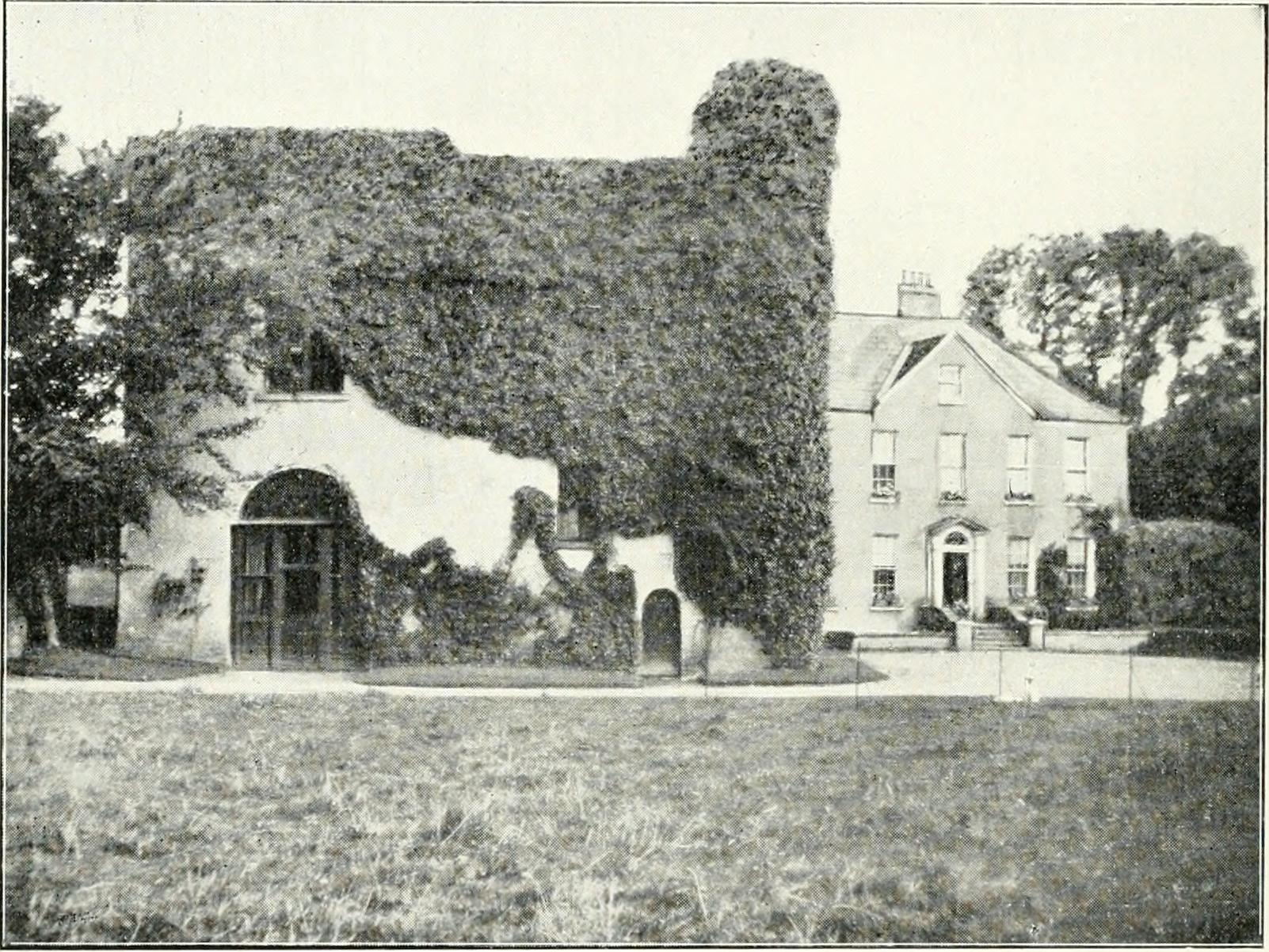
Athgoe House and Castle

Athgoe (Irish: Áth Gó, meaning 'ford of the water') is the name of an area constituting three townlands situated in the Barony of Newcastle, in South Dublin, Ireland located near the Dublin/Kildare border. The townlands are Athgoe, Athgoe North and Athgoe South.

== Etymology ==
The name probably derives from either "Ath Gabha" (the "ford of the smith" in Irish, or "Smithford" to completely anglicize it) or "Áth Gó" the "ford of the water" or the ford leading to the sea. The land immediately to the west of Mileys Bridge (see below) is quite wet despite having been drained both recently and earlier. In the Ordnance Survey map of 1840, the contour line suggests a partially or permanently wet area. This would lend credence to the name being derived from the "ford of the water".

== Geography and land use ==
The area lies between Newcastle, County Dublin and the N7 Dublin to Limerick road. The townlands are contiguous and range from the top of Athgoe Hill southwest to the Kildare border. Athgoe is a predominantly rural area with tillage, cattle and sheep as the main farming activities. The ford that gives the area its name would have crossed what is now a minor stream at the bottom of Athgoe hill that feeds into the Camac river further east. The Camac eventually empties into the Liffey at Heuston Station.

== History ==
At the top of Athgoe hill there is a circular earthwork described as "Raheen" on maps (the little rath), although it is possibly a Bronze Age barrow. Athgoe Castle (completed in 1579 by the Locke family) is a prominent landmark. The small post-medieval bridge spanning the stream is known locally as Miley's bridge. In the documentary records, the earliest mention of Athgoe is in the 13th century when a document is witnessed by one Thomas De Agdoo in 1250. Later, in 1283, another document is witnessed by Roger of Athgo.
