= Leas Cross scandal =

Nursing home scandal in Ireland

The Leas Cross scandal erupted in Ireland when the nursing home with this name, located near Swords, County Dublin, closed several weeks after a 2005 Prime Time television report revealed sub-standard living conditions there. The documentary showed a patient with several bedsores who went on to develop MRSA. Public concern over the Leas Cross scandal led to the formation of the Health Information and Quality Authority (HIQA).

== Hynes Report ==
Peter McKenna, a 60-year-old man with Down syndrome and Alzheimer's, who died 13 days after being transferred to the home in 2000, was the subject of a report by Martin Hynes, former head of the Irish Blood Transfusion Service. Mr. McKenna had been transferred from St. Michael's House to the nursing home despite the objections of his family – he was a ward of court. He needed round-the-clock nursing care but that was difficult to manage in the nursing home. St. Michael's House described the report as flawed.

== O'Neill Report ==
A report by Professor Des O'Neill reviewed deaths at the home between 2002 and 2005, finding that care was deficient and it was consistent with a finding of institutional abuse.

The report also expressed concern at the short time between patients being transferred from hospitals to the nursing home, particularly in the case of patients from St. Itas Psychiatric Hospital. It also stated that there was almost a complete absence of systematic monitoring of deaths in Irish nursing homes.
