= Dublin's Q102 =

- Dublin; Ireland
- Broadcast area: Greater Dublin Area; Leinster via DAB+
- Frequencies: FM: 102.2 MHz; DAB+: FáilteDAB

Programming
- Format: Adult contemporary

Ownership
- Owner: News UK Broadcasting Ltd; (News UK)

History
- First air date: May 2000
- Former names: Lite 102.2 (2000–2004)

Links
- Webcast: Listen Live
- Website: www.q102.ie

Dublin's Q102 is a commercial radio station in Dublin, owned by Onic which is in turn owned by News UK. It broadcasts on 102.2 MHz FM and DAB+. The station is licensed to target the 35+ age group, and must provide hourly news, as well as current events programming. It broadcasts under a contract from Coimisiún na Meán. Q102 broadcasts from Macken House in Dublin's Docklands.

The station was launched as Lite 102.2. On purchasing the station, UTV rebranded it to Dublin's Q102 thanks to research of Dublin people aged over 35, who decided on bringing back the name of a former pirate radio station.

== Original Q102 (1985-1988) ==
During the latter half of 1984, the Dublin 102 frequency was originally planned to launch as KISS-FM (similar to its original development for Radio Nova in September 1982), but was never materialized. With its original studios being located at Parnell Square, the original Q102 made its first FM test transmissions on 101.9 MHz between Christmas 1984 and January 1985, with medium wave tests being also heard on 1116kHz and 1134kHz in parallel on New Years Day 1985, but by the following morning, all transmissions had ceased due to the theft of the station's then-new equipment in the Dublin mountains. After being delayed for a few weeks, Q102 gave the green light and the station pre-launched with various launch promos and several hours of continuous music. A few hours later, the station launched on 23 January 1985 by disc-jockey Lawrence John, who also voiced its launch promo as a parody to both Ronald Reagan and the Cold War. The first song Q102 played after launch is "Straight Ahead" by Kool & The Gang.

It was marketed as an Irish owned and operated station in contrast to one competitor Radio Nova's severe union issues throughout the mid-1980s. Initial broadcasts were on 828kHz medium wave and 102.0 MHz in stereo. After several weeks, the FM frequency was moved up slightly to 102.1 MHz. The original Q102 featured a mix adult contemporary music alongside a handful of Top 40 and oldies titles, but quickly transitioned as a full-time Top 40/CHR station by the following year. Radio Nova was dying at the time, but the Q still faced Top 40 competition against Sunshine 101 and Energy 103. As a CHR station in the latter half of the 1980s, Q102's original music format features a primary 50/50 mix of American, British, and other European titles, alongside a very small amount of Irish titles. Q102 also aired special programming during its early years from the ABC Radio Network such as "Spotlight Special" and Casey Kasem's American Top 40.

Exactly five months right after Radio Nova closed in March 1986, Q102's programming was disrupted in July 1986 by a mysterious ‘phantom’ who managed to break into the VHF link to the AM transmitter and disrupt normal programming on 819 kHz. Reports from Anoraks UK say that the station received anonymous calls from Dublin, saying that the ‘ghost’ of Radio Nova was to return and later that day, the 'phantom' began whispering on the microphone, created a few sound effects, and stunting with music clips and Radio Nova's jingles produced by JAM Creative Productions on Q102's AM frequency. Engineers later discovered a person of interest on a bicycle with a rucksack and a homemade dipole near the Q's transmitter site, but the hijacker escaped quick before capture. During the end of its hijack, the AM frequency played an edited version of a jingle cut from Capital Radio London as the hijacker's next target, it never happened. The Q's AM frequency immediately returned to normal programming afterward.

In March 1988, Q102 bought the equipment of its rival Energy 103 after its sudden closure and took over all its frequencies, giving it the prominence on the AM and FM bands, and Q102 was rebranded as "Super Q102" three months later in June 1988. Since its rebrand and frequency upgrade, Super Q102 was also heard on both 738kHz and 819kHz medium wave, as well as several FM frequencies serving various parts of the city. As "Super Q102", its CHR format focused more on American titles than its 50/50. However, the Q still faced competition over Sunshine 101 which both stations were Top 5 in the Dublin ratings. Unfortunately because of Ireland's newly established legislation coming into play, many radio stations, alongside the original Q102 (or Super Q102), ceased operations on 30 December 1988.

== Relaunch ==
The station's relaunch in May 2000 was orchestrated by former Big Brother UK contestant Ray Shah, who took over the station until it was relaunched. The take over involved a defacement of Lite 102.2's website and the constant playing of "Mah Nà Mah Nà" during the transition period. The station's Radio Data System PS name was changed to MUPPET during this time, before settling on Q102 afterwards. The first song played on the new Dublin's Q102 was "Night Fever" by The Bee Gees followed by "What About Me" by Shannon Noll.

In February 2025, Kathryn Thomas joined Q102 to present the breakfast show, with the station getting a new logo and visual identity.

Following the launch of FáilteDAB in 2025, Q102 began broadcasting on DAB+ throughout Dublin and the wider Leinster area.

== Programming ==
The station broadcasts mainly adult contemporary music aimed at the 35+ age group. The station broadcasts news on the hour (half-hour at peak times) along with sports, traffic and weather updates.

=== Presenters ===
- Kathryn Thomas (The Morning Show)
- Ryan Tubridy (The Ryan Tubridy Show / The Ryan Tubridy Show On Sunday)
- Liam Coburn (Feel Good Afternoons)
- Elizabeth Hearst (Dublin Today (Mon-Thurs))
- Hazel Nolan (Dublin Sport Today (Friday/Saturday))
- Paul Bradley (Saturday Breakfast / Sunday Mid-Mornings)
- Johnny Bowe (Saturday Mid-Mornings / Sunday Afternoon)
- Martin King (Saturday Afternoon)
- Lisa Armstrong (The Feel Good 80's Party (Sat) / The LoveZone (Sun))
- Emma Ní Chearúil (An Blas Beag)
- Lynsey Dolan (Overnights / Sunday Breakfast)

== Q102 News ==
The news focus is local to Dublin, with coverage of national public interest stories, and major international events. Main news bulletins are simulcast on sister station, FM104.

=== Q102 News Team ===
- Kevin O’Mahony (Head of News)
- Jonathan Byrne
- Hazel Nolan
- Louise Phelan D'Cruz
- Elizabeth Hearst
- David Seagrave

=== Q102 sports reporter ===
- Peter Branigan
