= Radio Limerick One =

Radio Limerick one
- Ireland
- Broadcast area: Limerick / Munster
- Frequency: Formerly 105.0, 100.0, 90.5MHz

Programming
- Format: Pop / Variety / Chat

Ownership
- Owner: Gerard Madden

History
- First air date: October 1989

Links
- Website: rlo105.com (archived 2001)

Radio Limerick One, also called Limerick 95FM and RLO at times, was a licensed radio station serving Limerick city and county. Licensed by the Independent Radio and Television Commission in 1989, its licence was removed in 1996 for misbehaviour, although the station did not leave the airwaves. It was eventually replaced as the licensed operator by Limerick's Live 95FM.

== History ==
The station started broadcasting in October 1989 from studios in Dooradoyle, Limerick. In its early days, the station had separate radio shows covering about 20 different topics.

Around 1992, the station rebranded itself as "Limerick 95FM" and moved to 100 O'Connell St. in the centre of Limerick city. Changes in ownership occurred through the years as well. During this period, the station became among the first Irish radio stations to transmit via satellite - a service called "Ireland's Overnight Network", allowing other stations to air its generic overnight content in order to operate 24 hours a day without relying on automated playlists.

== Irish Satellite Radio ==
Limerick 95FM also had a sister station for a time called Irish Satellite Radio broadcast via Astra 1B on frequency 11538 V. The station was on the VH1 TV channel transponder using the analogue transmission system known as Panda. It featured a different schedule, programs and news than the Local variant but at times would simulcast with Limerick 95FM for special events.

ISR was available to listeners around the world including ex-pats who enjoyed listening to another Irish radio station, an alternative to RTÉ Radio 1, which also broadcast from the same transponder.

Both the UK and Germany in particular tuned into Astra 1 transmissions due to their respective countries subscription TV packages emanating from the bird. Thus Irish satellite radio picked up a large audience from subscribers to the Sky UK service or indeed people who had installed free-to-air satellite equipment. Several satellite TV listings magazines including Satellite Times and What Satellite TV listed the stations program schedule every month.

== Pirate operation ==
In controversial circumstances which would see court actions continuing into the next century, the station lost its licence in February 1996. However, it continued broadcasting through its UK legal licence on satellite; this was deflected by unknown community groups back on to the FM broadcast band. Its satellite licence was removed in 1999 by the Radio Authority in the UK (who had issued it) due to intervention by the then IRTC in Ireland; it was now also broadcasting on the internet worldwide and this source was now deflected again providing a continuous FM broadcast until the Comreg clamp-downs on pirate broadcasting in the early 2000s, and had continued rebroadcasting after many raids.

During the pirate years, Radio Limerick One continued to operate as it did when it was a licensed station. News bulletins were broadcast hourly with night time reports from UK commercial service IRN. Local obituaries were also read several times a day by the on-air presenter. RLO also had a dedicated sports team and local Gaelic Athletic Association matches were broadcast during season on Sundays using professional outside broadcast equipment where permitted. The station had a full schedule of programming from 7am-1am.

In the morning, the breakfast show featured a mix of classic hits, news, weather and travel reports and chat. This was followed in the afternoon with a lean towards Oldies/M.O.R/Country music. Drive-time and evenings featured a 60s/70s/80s music mix over the years. The night time hours of RLO typically featured chat shows, including a "Late and Live" phone in program which features had little or no telephone screening process - meaning almost anyone could get on the air. This led to some controversial incidents over the years and the show was known for its "anything goes" approach.

During overnight hours non-stop classic hits were played and in the latter years the "Late and Live" program would be repeated throughout the night.

In 2002, it applied for, was refused, and appealed to no effect a licence to operate a medium wave service in the city of Limerick. The licence was won by a group chaired by Joe Harrington, a former RLO presenter, which never went on air.

During its period as a pirate, much use has been made of the Radio Data System to provide politically loaded messages to users with suitable equipment, ranging from "NO RLO NO VOTE" during a protest at the 2002 Irish General Election to "HELP RLO STOP BCI SLEEZE", a message of such length as to require scrolling. This only provoked more raids and court cases.

By late 2005, the station was under the management of Gerry Hannan who also resumed his late night talk show. The studio was moved to his local book shop.

After a Comreg raid on 13 December 2006, the station never returned. The engineers and 'community groups' later worked on other projects. Final owner Gerry Hannan announced that he planned RLO to go the legal route of IP broadcasting online. This involved broadcasting online and through broadband television services, where people could stream it legally around the world. However, the service failed to gain traction, and RLO eventually ceased operations for good.

== RLO TV ==
Gerard Madden also operated a local TV station under the name RLO TV. The station was initially broadcast from the Sirius satellite commencing in 1997 and also transmitted in later years via Hot Bird on the frequency 12.597 GHz.

Free satellite equipment was offered to pubs and establishments around the city and county to facilitate reception of Ireland's first digital television channel.

The satellite incarnation of the channel featured a schedule that was looped every few hours with pre-recorded programs presented by several staff from the radio station. The broadcast was uplinked from London, a staff member flew each day with a new tape to play every morning and flew home again.

Many other programs were featured on the schedule at this time including recorded coverage of Local Gaelic Athletic Association games often unseen on other channels, Irish music video showcases and other general entertainment fare all produced in house at the RLO studios.

After a brief period broadcasting from Hot Bird, satellite transmissions ceased in late 1999.

Upon obtaining several licenses to deflect UK terrestrial TV stations to the county area of the region, the station began broadcasting on UHF Channel 51 from Woodcock Hill to Limerick city. This was linked directly to the main studio and live broadcasting could begin. Gerry Hannan's "Late & Live" radio programme was broadcast live on TV showing the radio studio. Provisions were being sought to set up equipment at prominent 'guests' private houses to broadcast live from, but this never came to light. Live production began on the second floor and the radio was suppressed on one channel to up-link to the hill-sites. There were two other transmission sites at Newcastlewest and Knockfierna intended for reception in the county.

Superimposing background images of limerick on green screens with high end technology began on the Gerry Hannan, Tom O'Donnell and History show. Lighting, sound, vision and transmission were all handled in-house. Staff were trained with high end digital editing suites and high resolution camera's for the time.

At night time Channel 5 was rebroadcast between RLO TV shows. Broadcasts were usually between 22:00 and 01:00 with the frequency reverting to Channel 5 straight after the local broadcast ended.

During this period, a live element was introduced. Cameras were set up in the Radio Limerick one studio and joint TV/Radio simulcasts began.

After an ODTR raid in 2001 the radio and TV equipment were seized and the channel never returned.
