= 98FM =

- Ireland
- Broadcast area: Dublin
- Frequency: FM: 98.1, 97.4 MHz

Programming
- Format: Adult contemporary

Ownership
- Owner: Bauer Media Audio Ireland

History
- First air date: 10 November 1989; 36 years ago

Technical information
- Transmitter coordinates: 53°14′43″N 6°14′21″W

Links
- Website: www.98fm.com

98FM is a local radio station in Dublin, Ireland, operated by Bauer Media Audio Ireland, under a sound broadcasting contract from Coimisiún na Meán. The station broadcasts on the 98.1 MHz FM frequency. 98FM's broadcast antenna is located on Three Rock Mountain, County Dublin at 5 kW, and can be heard in Dublin and neighbouring counties. 98FM also has a relay in north County Dublin, broadcasting on 97.4 MHz. Since 2025, the station has been marketed as "Dublin's Best Music Mix".

== Programming ==
The station broadcasts mainly popular music, aimed at 25- to 44-year-olds. Its flagship programmes are The Big Breakfast with Brendan O'Loughlin and Rebecca Shekleton, The Sound of the City with Barry Dunne, The Big Ride Home with Brian Maher, The Fix with Leanne Hanafin and The Sound of the City at Night with Karl Dawson. The station broadcasts hourly news (half-hourly at peak times) along with sports, weather and traffic reports.

== History and station information ==
The station's first broadcast was in 1989, as a rock station called Classic Hits—98FM and quickly overtook rival Capital Radio 104.4 (now FM104), sometimes attributed to the Morning Crew show, originally presented by Pat Courtnay and Elaine Geraghty, and to its evening talk show presented by Fr. Michael Cleary. Changes led FM104 to overtake 98FM in the Joint National Listenership Research survey. This led to a crisis at 98FM, with the station changing aspects of its programming, starting by dropping Pat and Elaine for the "Dawn Patrol". The Morning Crew name was later revived, but with a new presenting team. The station name was changed, dropping the 'Classic Hits' as was the slogan, and Chris Barry was recruited from FM104. The station eventually settled down to competing with FM104, and the two stations continue to compete to this day.

In a JNLR survey in August 2009 what was then called Dublin's 98 Breakfast ( now 98FM's Big Breakfast with Rebbeca & Brendan) was the most listened to breakfast show in Dublin; it also had the highest audience during Barry Dunne's daytime show and 98's Inbox had the second highest audience in the capital between 19:00-21:30. The station also did well at weekends with biggest audiences in Dublin on Saturdays and Sundays, though this was short lived and the station slipped back to the number 2 position in Dublin in the following survey. Currently 98FM have a market share (all adults 15+) of 6.4% and a listened yesterday figure 12% thus making them the fourth most listened to Dublin station behind SPIN 1038, Dublin's Q102 and FM104 at numbers 3, 2 and 1 respectively.

On 12 June 2008, the station was renamed Dublin's 98. The slogan "Smile" was backed by the song "Smile" by The Supernaturals. That year, Dublin's 98 was named PPI Music Station of the Year at the PPI Radio Awards. On 3 April 2009, the station released a new logo with the slogan "Dublin's Best Music Mix". On 31 May 2010, the station's name returned to being called 98FM. 98 run hourly news, sport and weather bulletins from the Dublin News Centre between 6 am and 7pm. From pm to midnight syndicated news is broadcast on the station The news is read half-hourly during peak times (this is between 6am and 10am and 4pm and 7pm). In November 2012, the station dropped the Morning Crew title when former Today FM presenter Ray Foley took over the breakfast show replacing Aidan Power and Claire Solan.

In 2013 it was announced that 98FM had poached Adrian Kennedy and Jeremy Dixon from rival station FM104. The two had been synonymous with the stations late night Phoneshow, but moved to 98FM to present a mid-morning talk show "Dublin Talks". The show began in March 2014 - and ran until March 2021.

It was announced on 22 December 2015 that Ray Foley would cease to present the station's breakfast show. He said he would focus on his television work in 2016.

In August 2019 after winning Music Station of the Year, Music Programme of the Year and Music and arguably the most prestigious prize of radio, Music and Entertainment Broadcaster of the Year Dara Quilty left the station to move to New York City where he is working with his band Apella and is now a host on MTV.

== Awards ==
| Year | Nominee / work | Award | Result |
|---|---|---|---|
| 2006 | 98FM | Best Breakfast Programme in Ireland at the PPI Radio Awards | Won |
| 2006 | 98FM | Best News Broadcasts at the PPI Radio Awards | Won |
| 2008 | 98FM | Music Station of the Year at the PPI Radio Awards | Won |
| 2009 | The Morning Crew | Breakfast Programme of the Year at the PPI Radio Awards | Nominated |
| 2010 | Dermot and Dave | Breakfast Programme of the Year at the PPI Radio Awards | Won |
| 2011 | Dermot and Dave | General Music Programme of the Year at the PPI Radio Awards | Won |
| 2011 | The Morning Crew | Breakfast Programme of the Year at the PPI Radio Awards | Nominated |
| 2012 | The Morning Crew with Aidan and Claire | Breakfast Programme of the Year at the PPI Radio Awards | Nominated |
| 2012 | Dermot and Dave | General Music Programme of the Year at the PPI Radio Awards | Won |
| 2012 | Dermot Whelan | Music Broadcaster of the Year at the PPI Radio Awards | Won |
| 2013 | Dermot and Dave | General Music Programme of the Year at the PPI Radio Awards | Won |
| 2013 | Dave Moore | Music Broadcaster of the Year at the PPI Radio Awards | Nominated |
| 2013 | 98FM | Music Station of the Year at the PPI Radio Awards | Won |
| 2015 | Dara Quilty | Music Programme of the Year at the PPI Radio Awards | Nominated |
| 2015 | Dara Quilty | Music Broadcaster of the Year at the PPI Radio Awards | Won |
| 2016 | Dara Quilty | Music Broadcaster of the Year at the PPI Radio Awards | Nominated |
| 2016 | Dara Quilty | Music Programme of the Year at the PPI Radio Awards | Won |
| 2017 | Dara Quilty | Music Broadcaster of the Year at the IMRO Radio Awards | Won |
| 2017 | Dara Quilty | Music Programme of the Year at the IMRO Radio Awards | Won |
| 2018 | Dara Quilty | Music Programme of the Year at the IMRO Radio Awards | Won |
| 2018 | Dara Quilty | Music Broadcaster of the Year at the IMRO Radio Awards | Nominated |
| 2018 | 98FM | Music Station of the Year at the IMRO Radio Awards | Won |
| 2019 | Dara Quilty | Music Broadcaster of the Year at the IMRO Radio Awards | Won |
| 2019 | Dara Quilty | Music Programme of the Year at the IMRO Radio Awards | Won |
| 2019 | 98FM | Music Station of the Year at the IMRO Radio Awards | Won |

== See also ==
- Today FM
- SPIN 1038
