= Radio Nova 100FM (Ireland) =

Dublin area music station

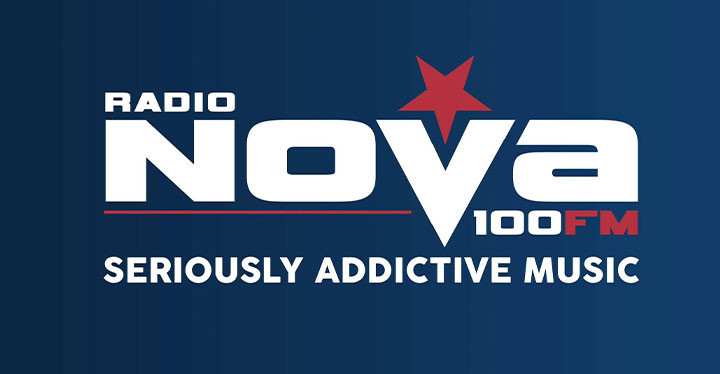
- Dublin; Ireland
- Broadcast area: Dublin and surrounding areas
- Frequency: 100.3 MHz
- RDS: _NOVA_

Programming
- Format: "Guitar-based music"

Ownership
- Owner: Classic Rock Broadcasting Ltd

History
- First air date: 1 September 2010

Technical information
- ERP: 12,000 watts
- HAAT: 448 metres (1470 feet)

Links
- Website: RadioNova

Radio Nova is a radio station licensed by Coimisiún na Meán, based in Dublin, Ireland. It was awarded its broadcasting licence by the BAI in September 2008 and launched on 1 September 2010. It is the only Dublin radio station licensed to transmit to the extensive Dublin commuter belt, including Dublin and counties Wicklow, Kildare, Louth and Meath. NOVA broadcasts on 100.3 FM from Three Rock Mountain, Dublin, 100.5 from Saggart Hill, County Dublin, to serve County Kildare and 95.7 FM from Bray Head in North Wicklow, to cover County Wicklow. The station covers County Meath from its main Dublin transmitter (100.3 MHz). The station is now also available on DAB+ across much of the country, with the station launching on Fáiltedab Mux 2 on 03 May 2026.

== Shareholding ==
The current parent company of Radio Nova is Bay Broadcasting. Bay Broadcasting shareholders include Kevin Branigan and Mike Ormonde. Bay Broadcasting also owns Ireland's Classic Hits Radio, Sunshine 106.8, Galway Bay FM and Energy Dance ( digital radio station)

Former shareholders included Vienna Investments, Des Whelan and Pat McDonagh.

== Programming ==
NOVA broadcasts what it describes as a diet of "guitar-based music". In November 2012, it received a derogation from Coimisiún na Meán to reduce its news content from 20% of total programming to 10%, on account of it being a special interest station. As a result, NOVA continues to broadcast hourly news bulletins between 6 am and 12 midnight, as well as music news segments at various times during the day.

== Location ==
The station is based at Castleforbes House, Castleforbes Road, in the North Docklands area of Dublin.

== See also ==
- Radio Nova (Ireland) - pirate station by the same name operating from 1981 to 1986
