= Pirate radio in Ireland =

Unlicensed radio stations in Ireland

Pirate radio in Ireland has had a long history, with hundreds of pirate radio stations having operated within the country.

Due to past lax enforcement of the rules, the lack of commercial radio until 1989, and the small physical size of the country, pirate radio stations proliferated for a number of years. A small number of stations also attempted television broadcasts although most of these ventures were short-lived.

== History ==
=== 20th century ===
Pirate radio in Ireland has its origins in the early and mid-20th century. In 1940, for example, Mayo man Jack Sean McNeela died on hunger strike in Arbour Hill Military Detention Barracks after 55 days protesting his arrest for operating a pro IRA clandestine radio station.

In the early 1970s, Irish language activists in county Galway established Saor Raidió Chonamara to protest the lack of an official fulltime broadcasting service in Irish. The authorities responded by establishing such a service.

While the number of recorded pirate radio stations during the 1980s was in the hundreds, only a few have been notable enough to be remembered. Pirate radio reached its height of popularity in Ireland in that decade after Sunshine Radio and Radio Nova were launched in Dublin. They were soon joined by others.

It was commercial music radio at a time when state broadcaster RTÉ struggled to capture the youth market. This was followed by the arrival in 1982 of South Coast Radio, ABC Tramore and Radio ERI in Cork. These were pirate radio stations run for the first time on a commercial basis with the critical support of Ireland's advertising industry.

Professional market research conducted in the 1980s by market research companies such as Lansdowne Research, Irish Marketing Surveys and Behaviours and Attitudes showed that these radio stations consistently led RTE in terms of reach and market share

In Cork, Radio ERI had a consistent reach in excess of 50% with a reach of 63% recorded in 1986/87, an unprecedented listenership figure. The station boasted an extensive marketing and sales department which produced no fewer than six future local radio managing directors or chief executives throughout Ireland under the legalised regime after 1989

In 1988 it, along with stations such as Sunshine and Q102 run by Mike Hogan (who was the first managing director of Dublin ILR franchise holder Capital Radio in 1989) and owned by nightclub impresario Pierre Doyle, had annual sales revenues in millions of pounds.

This led to the Radio and Television Act 1988 which paved the way, with the cooperation of nearly all pirate radio stations, to a new era in independent local radio in Ireland which commenced in 1989. The Independent Radio and Television Commission (IRTC) was established under this legislation.

The 1988 Act effectively limited future pirate radio stations by making it illegal to advertise or support them with stiff penalties. The 1980s were therefore the heyday of pirate radio in Ireland.

=== 21st century ===
In 2002 a new radio regulation body, the Commission for Communications Regulation (ComReg), was founded by the Irish government to replace the Office of the Director of Telecommunications Regulation (ODTR).

ComReg had much more funding, staff and resources than its predecessor – and these were put to use in May 2003, when a major crackdown on Dublin pirates saw virtually every station wiped off the band. This series of raids was conducted over two days and involved Garda Síochána officers and ESB staff.

Today only a handful of stations still operate in Dublin (mostly limited to evenings and/or weekends) and in some border areas. Operations elsewhere tend to be rare and sporadic.

== Notable stations ==
=== Dublin ===
==== Radio Dublin ====
Radio Dublin started in 1966 founded by Ken Sheehan, and peaked in the late 1970s and up unto the early 1980s until the arrival of Radio Nova and Sunshine radio whose professionalism and quality stereo reception left the station adrift in their wake in the subsequent years. Radio Dublin broadcast on MW, SW and FM simultaneously.

After Eamonn Cooke took over, Radio Dublin had ever increasing ambitions. It was the first radio station in the Republic of Ireland to complete a 24-hour broadcast, this on the occasion of the Irish general election of June 1977. The broadcast was hosted by Roland Burke and David Moore and Bernard Evans. The station ceased full-time operation shortly after the jailing of the station's then-owner Eamonn Cooke in 2003 for historic child sex offences many of which took place at the radio station.

==== Smaller stations of the late 1970s, early 1980s ====
Other pirate stations in Dublin included Radio Dublin, Capitol Radio (Alternative Music station which from September 1986 had an alter ego station Nitesky 96FM), Big D, Radio City, TTTR (Country Music) and ARD (Alternative Radio Dublin - based in Drimnagh then at the Crofton Airport Hotel in Whitehall). Amongst the DJs at the Big D were Chris Wilkinson, Dennis Murray and Dj Shagnasty. Well-known names on radio and television that went through these smaller stations include Marty Whelan, Gerry Ryan, Dave Fanning, John Paul, Ian Dempsey and Robbie Irwin. North Dublin Community Radio (a forerunner to NEAR FM), was a local community-based radio station, which operated in the Northside of Dublin broadcasting on 100 MHz FM and on 1008 kHz AM.

==== 1990s ====
In the 1990s, a number of stations started, resumed or continued broadcasting despite legislation and occasional raids. Notable stations of this period included Radio Dublin, Sunset, Kiss, Pulse, DLR, Phantom and Radio Limerick One.

=== Offshore Radio ===
While offshore pirates were rarer in Ireland, they still existed, and many notable UK offshore stations had a connection with Ireland. Both Radio Atlanta and Radio Caroline were built on board ships that were docked in (and made initial test transmissions from) a private Irish port at Greenore in the Republic of Ireland. The "Caroline North" station was occasionally tendered from Dundalk. The Dutch stations Radio Paradijs and REM island were also fitted out in Irish ports while Laser 558 had some Irish staff and financial backing. Another offshore station located at various locations off the coast of Scotland in international waters, later identified itself as Radio Scotland and Ireland when its radio ship moved to anchorage off the west coast and within range of Ireland (for a time they anchored off Northern Ireland).

== See also ==
- Pirate radio in Limerick
- Pirate radio in Cork
- Pirate radio in Kerry
- South Coast Television
- Wireless Telegraphy Acts Law concerning pirate radio.
