= East Coast FM =

- Bray, County Wicklow; Ireland
- Broadcast area: Wicklow and Environs
- Frequencies: 94.9 MHz, 96.2 MHz, 99.9 MHz, 102.9 MHz and 104.4 MHz (Arklow)

Programming
- Format: AC/talk

Ownership
- Owner: East Coast Radio Limited

History
- First air date: 25 October 1989

Links
- Website: www.eastcoast.fm

East Coast FM (formerly known as BLB, Horizon FM, then East Coast Radio) is an Irish local radio station broadcasting from Bray, County Wicklow under a sound broadcasting contract from the Broadcasting Authority of Ireland.

The station operates in County Wicklow and into the adjoining counties of Dublin, Kildare, Carlow and Wexford, broadcasting on the following frequencies: 94.9 FM, 96.2 FM, 99.9 FM, 102.9 FM and 104.4 FM in Arklow. To achieve coverage of all of its franchise area, it requires six transmitters including stations at Bray Head, Wicklow Head, Avoca, Arklow, Baltinglass and a transmitter located at Slieve Thoul in Saggart County Dublin where the Wicklow, Kildare and Dublin borders meet.

== History ==
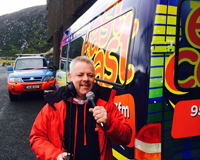
East Coast FM outside broadcast unit in 2014

East Coast FM began as BLB (Bray Local Broadcasting) in 1984. Originally an unlicensed operator, it was launched as "Horizon Radio" when it received a licence from The Independent Radio & Television Commission (now known as The Broadcasting Authority of Ireland) and later merged with South Wicklow's Ezy103 to become East Coast Radio.

In 2002, the station was renamed from "East Coast Radio" to "East Coast FM" and moved from its Victorian premises at Prince of Wales Terrace on Quinsboro Road, Bray (where it had been located since 1985) to a state-of-the-art radio centre complex in Ballywaltrim, Bray. The station is located on Killarney Road in Bray. BLB has also operated out of a rooftop office on top of what is now Katie Gallagher's pub on Strand Road in the early 1980s.

East Coast FM is owned by East Coast Radio Limited. Denis O'Brien's Communicorp group was a shareholder in the station from 1998 to 2008. As of December 2007, Communicorp reportedly holds a 30% share in the station.

== Recognition ==
| Year | Association | Award | Recipient | Result |
|---|---|---|---|---|
| 2006 | PPI Radio Awards | Music Programme - General | East Coast Lunch | Gold |
| 2013 | Love Radio Awards | Entertainment & Leisure | Bray Wanderers "Fight For Survival" advert | Gold |
| 2019 | IMRO Radio Awards | News Story/News Event | The Grand Hotel news coverage | Bronze |
| 2020 | IMRO Radio Awards | Current Affairs Programme - Local/Regional | The Morning Show with Declan Meehan | Silver |
| 2022 | IMRO Radio Awards | Current Affairs Programme - Local/Regional | Welcome to Wicklow | Bronze |
| 2022 | IMRO Radio Awards | The Gay Byrne Award - Newcomer of the Year | Max Kane | Silver |
| 2023 | IMRO Radio Awards | Current Affairs Programme - Local/Regional | The Morning Show with Declan Meehan | Bronze |

== Notable former staff ==
- Claire Byrne
- Colette Fitzpatrick
- Joe Harrington
- Adrian Kennedy
- Jim McCabe
- Laura Whitmore
- Ray Foley

== See also ==
- Radio in Ireland
