= Sunshine 106.8 =

- Ireland
- Broadcast area: Dublin
- Frequencies: 106.8 MHz, Online, Virgin Media Channel 933, DAB+ FailteDAB
- RDS: SUNSHINE

Programming
- Format: Soft AC/Easy Listening

Ownership
- Owner: Star Broadcasting Limited

History
- First air date: October 2001 (as "Dublin's Country 106.8")

Links
- Website: sunshineradio.ie

Sunshine 106.8 is an easy listening radio station, based in Dublin, Ireland. It is licensed by the Broadcasting Authority of Ireland (BAI) as a commercial FM broadcaster in the Dublin area. The station broadcasts on 106.8 MHz from Three Rock Mountain to County Dublin. It is included on the rebroadcast system operated within the Dublin Port Tunnel, and took part in trial DAB broadcasts in Dublin and Cork between 2012 and 2017.

== History ==
The station launched in October 2001 and was originally identified on-air as 'Dublin's Country 106.8FM' and later (from 2005) as 'Country Mix 106.8'. The station was completely re-branded as Sunshine 106.8 in October 2010.

Originally based from studios in Stillorgan, it subsequently moved to studios on North Wall Quay in Dublin 1. The station later moved to studios and offices at Castleforbes House in Dublin 1. The studios at Castleforbes House went live in December 2015.

Sunshine 106.8 broadcasts 24 hours a day and features an easy listening format, including genres such as soul, Country Crossover, Easy Listening and Irish music.

The station signed a ten-year contract with the Broadcasting Authority of Ireland (BAI) on 12 September 2014 to continue broadcasting until 2024. From 2014, the station adopted the slogan 'Dublin's New Place to Relax', modifying this (in 2017) to 'Dublin's Easy Place to Relax'.

== Listenership ==
The Joint National Listenership Research (JNLR) survey, published on 24 October 2019, recorded 84,000 daily listeners for the station. Sunshine 106.8 recorded an 8.3% market share in the "All Adults" section of the JNLR report published in November 2022.
