= Ireland's Classic Hits Radio =

Irish commercial radio station

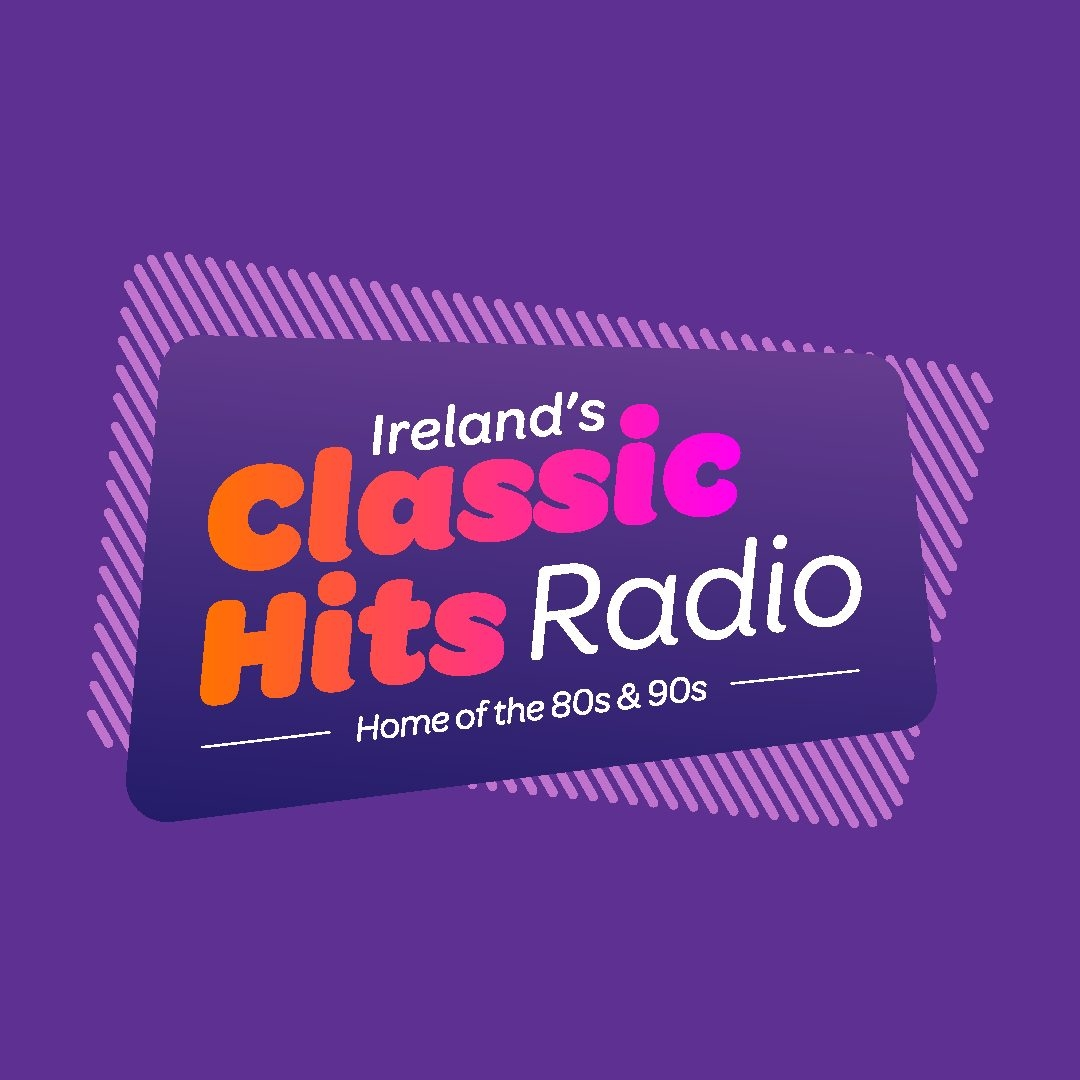
- Ireland
- Broadcast area: Greater Dublin, County Cork, County Limerick, County Clare and Galway
- Frequencies: 94.9 FM (Dublin); 94.8 FM (Cork); 94.6–97.4 MHz, 104.2–104.9 MHz
- RDS: CLASSIC.

Programming
- Language: English
- Format: Adult contemporary/classic hits

Ownership
- Owner: Choice Broadcasting Ltd

History
- First air date: 27 February 2009
- Former names: 4FM, Classic Hits 4FM

Links
- Webcast: Listen Live
- Website: classichits.ie

Ireland's Classic Hits Radio is an Irish independent multi-region radio station based in Dublin, and broadcasting to that city as well as Cork, Limerick, Galway, County Clare, County Wicklow, County Kildare, County Meath. It can also be picked up in parts of County Kerry, County Tipperary, County Waterford, County Wexford and County Mayo.

The station broadcasts under a sound broadcasting contract from the Broadcasting Authority of Ireland, aimed at Ireland's four main commuter belts, hence its original name of "4FM". It later went by "Classic Hits 4FM", dropping the "4FM" part in 2018 and becoming Ireland's Classic Hits Radio in 2021.

The station is part of Bay Broadcasting Limited, which also has interests in Radio Nova and Sunshine 106.8.

2021-2023 Logo

2018-2021 Logo

2016-2018 Logo

== Programming ==
Ireland's Classic Hits's slogan is The Home of The 80s and 90s and it has mainly adult contemporary/classic hits focused driven format with music from the 1970s, 1980s, 1990s, and 2000s, with occasional songs from the 2010s and small amounts of classic country and hot adult contemporary titles.

The station's flagship breakfast show, The Colm & Lucy Breakfast Show, is presented by Colm Hayes and Lucy Kennedy with other presenters including Trina Mara, Niall Boylan, Damien Farrelly, Gareth O'Callaghan, Ruth Scott, Adrian Kennedy, Barry Lang, Enda Murphy, Lisa Gernon and Meghann Scully. Niall Boylan hosts two daily phone-in shows from 12:00-14:00 and 21:00-23:00. The show won the best talk show award at the New York Festivals International Radio Program Awards Gala in June 2017.

A four-hour drivetime show is hosted by former 2FM presenter Damian Farrelly.

The station has a commitment to regularly playing Irish music, which it promotes under the slogan Guaranteed Irish. A specialist Irish-language programme is hosted on Sunday nights by Meghann Scully.

Additional specialist programming includes the twice-daily segment Classic Song Investigation, Classic Love Songs and Club Classics

In 2021 the station announced that Kim Wilde would present a custom version of 'The Kim Wilde 80s Show' each weekday at 6pm. In addition, the station announced the return of broadcaster Gareth O'Callaghan to its schedule in January 2022.

Programming is broadcast from its digital studios located at Castleforbes House in Dublin's Docklands area.

In September 2026, the station stopped playing Ed Sheeran's music after Macklemore was removed from Sheeran's tour following a speech he gave on the Gaza war at a previous stop on the tour.

== Former presenters ==
The breakfast show was previously presented by PJ Gallagher and Jim MacCabe and before that Damien Farrelly and before that Gareth O'Callaghan.

== Awards ==
Year	Recipient/Nominated work	Award	Result
2012	Classic Hits 4FM	PPI Radio Awards Community/Social Action	Gold
2012	Classic Hits 4FM	PPI Radio Awards Station Imaging	Bronze
2015	The Niall Boylan Show	PPI Radio Awards Interactive Speech Programme	Gold
2012	The Niall Boylan Show	New York Radio Awards Human Interest	Silver
2013	Classic Hits 4FM	New York Radio Awards Community Service	Bronze
2013	The Niall Boylan Show	New York Radio Awards Best Scheduled Talk Show	Bronze
2014	Niall Boylan	New York Radio Awards Speech Broadcaster of the Year	Silver
2013	Classic Hits 4FM	The Love Radio Awards Best Radio Station Ad (National)	Silver
2013	Classic Hits 4FM	The Love Radio Awards Best Government/Public Sector	Silver
2013	Classic Hits 4FM	The Love Radio Awards Best Retail	Silver
2013	Classic Hits 4FM	The Love Radio Awards Best Radio Station Ad (National)	Gold
2014	Classic Hits 4FM	The Love Radio Awards Best Motor Trade	Gold
2014	Classic Hits 4FM	The Love Radio Awards Best Radio Station Ad (National)	Bronze
2014	Classic Hits 4FM	The Love Radio Awards Best Radio Station Ad (National)	Gold
2014	Classic Hits 4FM	The Love Radio Awards Best Radio Station Ad (National)	Silver
2016	Classic Hits 4FM	The Love Radio Awards Best Motor Trade	Silver

== Frequencies ==
=== Cork ===
Frequency	Transmitter	Service area	Power
94.8 MHz	Farmer's Cross	Cork City and SE Cork	1.6 kW
94.8 MHz	Seskin (Bantry)	Bantry and SW Cork	N/A
95.2 MHz	Fermoy	Fermoy	0.1 kW
95.4 MHz	Nowen Hill	West Cork	5 kW
97.2 MHz	Youghal	Youghal	0.1 kW
97.4 MHz	Bweeng Mountain	North Cork, North East Cork and parts of South and East Limerick	2.5 kW
97.4 MHz	Carrigaline	Carrigaline, Crosshaven, Cobh and surrounding areas	0.1 kW

=== Limerick/Clare ===
Frequency	Transmitter	Service area	Power
104.2 MHz	Woodcock Hill	Limerick City and County	5 kW
104.6 MHz	Maghera	County Clare, parts of County Limerick, south County Galway and some parts of County Kerry and parts of County Mayo	50 kW

=== Galway ===
Frequency	Transmitter	Service area	Power
94.9 MHz	Clifden	West Galway	1 kW
104.9 MHz	Tonabrocky	Galway city, parts of County Mayo and surrounding areas	10 kW
95.1 MHz	Redmount Hill	East Galway and surrounding areas	1 kW
104.2 MHz	Knockletterfore	Connemara, Oughterard and surrounding areas	1 kW

=== Greater Dublin ===
Frequency	Transmitter	Service area	Power
94.6 MHz	Saggart Hill	Commuter belt areas of north County Kildare and east County Meath	0.5 kW
94.9 MHz	Three Rock Mountain	Dublin city and county	1.5 kW
94.6 MHz	Bray Head	Bray, Greystones and North Wicklow	0.2 kW
94.1 MHz	Balbriggan	Balbriggan, Skerries, Laytown, Bettystown, Rush and North County Dublin	0.2 kW
