= FM104 =

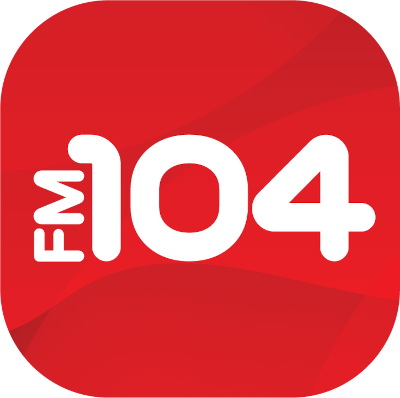
- Logo used since 2022
- Dublin; Ireland
- Broadcast area: County Dublin
- Frequency: 104.4 MHz

Programming
- Format: Contemporary hit radio

Ownership
- Owner: News UK Broadcasting Ltd; (News UK)

History
- First air date: 20 July 1989
- Former names: Capital Radio (1989–1991); Rock 104 (1991–1992)

Links
- Webcast: fm104.ie/player
- Website: fm104.ie

FM104 is an independent local radio station broadcast across Dublin, Ireland, on the frequency 104.4 MHz. It is operated by Capital Radio Productions Limited (unconnected with, and not to be confused with, Capital Radio plc), and is a subsidiary of Onic which is in turn owned by News Broadcasting, itself a subsidiary of News UK. The station broadcasts under a contract from Coimisiún na Meán. FM104 broadcasts from Macken House in Dublin's Docklands.

== History ==
Capital Radio, as the station was originally called, was the first Independent Local Radio contractor to take to the air on 20 July 1989. The station was owned by a consortium of Irish media and entertainment figures and managed by Mike Hogan. Although initially moderately successful, following the launch of rival 98FM, the station consistently trailed in the ratings. In May 1991, the station relaunched as Rock 104; however, this was unsuccessful and in late 1991 it underwent a restructuring under new CEO Dermot Hanrahan, who relaunched the station in April 1992 as Dublin's FM104, using the tag-line "Superstars of the 80s and 90s". This format was moderately successful allowing the station to reach financial stability. However, the station still lagged behind its competitor 98FM. A change in programming direction in 1995, together with the introduction of the highly successful Strawberry Alarm Clock, saw it finally overtake 98FM, though 98FM would itself undergo a (less radical) relaunch, dropping the "Classic Hits" moniker, and poaching Chris Barry for a time. In April 1996 FM104 moved into the Number 1 slot in the Dublin market for the first time. Since then, FM104 and 98FM have been keen rivals.

In 2004 the original shareholders sold the station to Scottish Radio Holdings for €30 million, in the first of a sequence of ownership changes. SRH were subsequently sold to EMAP, who in turn sold the station in 2007.

Denis O'Brien's Communicorp was the highest bidder for Emap's Irish operations when that company decided to sell its radio stations, buying FM104, Highland Radio and Today FM on 14 July 2007. In October 2007, the Broadcasting Commission of Ireland (BCI) approved Communicorp's proposed takeover of Today FM and Highland Radio, but not FM104. The deal was completed by January 2008. Due to a Competition Authority decision, Communicorp was required to sell-on FM104, which it did (to UTV Media) immediately upon its acquisition. O'Brien offloaded Highland Radio in mid-2008.

On 8 October 2007, it was announced by the Broadcasting Commission of Ireland that it would not agree to the sale of FM104 to Communicorp, although it granted approval for the acquisition of Today FM and Highland Radio. On 19 December 2007 it was announced that UTV Media had agreed to purchase FM104, subject to approval from the BCI and the Competition Authority. Under the structure of the agreement, Communicorp acquired FM104 but sold it immediately to UTV Media, thus keeping to the spirit of the earlier BCI ruling and allowing it to acquire the other EMAP stations. The sale of FM104 to UTV Media was completed on 10 April 2008.

== List of current FM104 presenters ==
=== Weekdays ===
- Jim Nugent (The Strawberry Alarm Clock)
- Thomas Crosse (The Strawberry Alarm Clock)
- Zeinab Elguzouli (The Strawberry Alarm Clock)
- Graham O’Toole (Graham & Nathan on FM104)
- Nathan O’Reilly (Graham & Nathan on FM104)
- Producer Niamh (O’Reilly) (Graham & Nathan on FM104)
- Kasey Campion (Locked In)
- Brandon Caulfield ('Dancefloor 104')

=== Weekends ===
- Enya Martin (Gerrup Outta Dat)
- David O'Reilly ('Gerrup Outta Dat')
- Brandon Caulfield (Weekends on FM104)
- Saoirse Long (Saturdays on FM104)
- Frank Jez (Big Urban Mix)
- Eamon Duffy (Now That's What I Call 90s and 00s)
- Rian Breathnach (Deireadh Seachtaine)
- Seán Munsanje (The Juice)
- Max Kane (Select Irish)
- Mia Poland (Pride Vibes)

== FM104 News ==
FM104's news output focus is local to Dublin, with coverage of national public interest stories, and major international events. Main news bulletins are simulcast on sister station, Dublin's Q102.

=== FM104 News Team ===
- Kevin O’Mahony (Head of News)
- Jonathan Byrne
- Hazel Nolan
- Louise Phelan D'Cruz
- Elizabeth Hearst
- David Seagrave

=== FM104 sports reporters ===
- Peter Branigan
- Declan Drake
