= List of industrial schools in Ireland =

Between 1868 and 1995, industrial schools in Ireland and Northern Ireland housed children whose parents neglected or were unable to care for them, children deemed to be living in dangerous circumstances, orphans and children convicted of criminal offences. The number of industrial schools in Ireland was at its highest, of 71, in 1898; of those, 61 were in the present-day Republic of Ireland. In the same year, industrial schools across Ireland were housing a total of 7,998 children.

== Republic of Ireland ==
The following schools were run by religious orders and funded by the public:

Institution	Location	Operated by	Sex admitted	Year established	Year disestablished	Notes
Artane Industrial School	Artane, Dublin	Christian Brothers	M	1870	1969	
Carriglea Park Industrial School	Dún Laoghaire, County Dublin	Christian Brothers	M	1894	1954	
Meath Protestant Industrial School	Blackrock, Dublin		M			
Our Lady of Succour	Newtownforbes					
Summerhill Industrial School	Summerhill, Dublin					
Stillorgan Industrial School					1917	
St Aidan's Industrial School for Girls	New Ross County Wexford	Good Shepherd Order	F			
St Ann's Industrial School for Girls	Killarney, County Kerry		F			
St. Anne's Industrial School for Girls	Booterstown, County Dublin		F			
St. Anne's Reformatory School for Girls	Kilmacud, County Dublin		F			
St. Ann's Industrial School for Girls and Junior Boys	Renmore, Lenaboy, County Galway		M/F			
St. Augustine's Industrial School for Girls	Templemore, County Tipperary		F			
St. Bernard's Industrial School for Girls	Fethard, Dundrum, County Tipperary		F			
St. Bridgid's Industrial School for Girls	Loughrea, County Galway		F			
St. Coleman's Industrial School for Girls	Cobh/Rushbrooke, County Cork		F			
St. Columba's Industrial School for Girls	Westport, County Mayo		F			
St Columba's Industrial School for Boys	Killybegs, County Donegal		M			
St. Conleth's Reformatory School for Boys	Daingean, County Offaly		M			
St. Dominick's Industrial School for Girls	Waterford		F			
St. Finbarr's Industrial School for Girls	Sundays Well, Marymount, Cork		F			
St. Francis Xavier's Industrial School for Girls and Junior Boys	Ballaghadereen, County Roscommon		M/F			
St. Francis' Industrial School for Girls	Cashel, County Tipperary		F			
St. George's Industrial School for Girls	Limerick		F			
St. John's Industrial School for Girls	Birr, County Offaly		F			
St. Joseph's Industrial School	Letterfrack	Christian Brothers	M			
St. Joseph's Industrial School	Whitehall, Dublin					
St. Joseph's Industrial School	Kilkenny, Ireland					
St. Joseph's Industrial School for Boys	Passage West, County Cork		M			
St Joseph's Industrial School, Tralee	Tralee, County Kerry					
St. Joseph's Industrial School for Girls and Junior Boys	Ballinasloe, County Galway		M/F			
St. Joseph's Industrial School for Girls and Junior Boys	Clifden, County Galway		M/F			
St. Joseph's Industrial School for Girls and Junior Boys	Liosomoine, Killarney, County Kerry		M/F			
St. Joseph's Industrial School for Girls	Cavan		F			
St. Joseph's Industrial School for Girls, Dundalk	Dundalk, County Louth		F			
St. Joseph's Industrial School for Girls, Kilkenny	Kilkenny		F			
St. Joseph's Industrial School for Girls	Mallow, County Cork		F			
St. Joseph's Industrial School for Girls	Summerhill, Athlone, County Westmeath		F			
St. Joseph's Industrial School for Girls	Whitehall, Drumcondra, Dublin 9		F			
St. Joseph's Industrial School for Senior Boys, Ferryhouse	Clonmel, County Tipperary		M			
St. Joseph's Industrial School for Senior Boys	Glin, County Limerick		M			
St. Joseph's Industrial School for Senior Boys	Greenmount, Cork		M			
St. Joseph's Industrial School for Senior Boys	Salthill, County Galway	Christian Brothers	M	1871	1995	It was the last industrial school left in the Republic of Ireland.
St. Joseph's Reformatory School for Girls	Limerick		F			
St. Kyran's Industrial School for Junior Boys	Rathdrum, County Wicklow		M			
St. Laurence's Industrial School for Girls	Sligo		F			
St. Laurence's Industrial School	Finglas, Dublin 11					
St. Martha's Industrial School for Girls	Bundoran, County Donegal		F			
St. Mary's Industrial School	Lakelands, Sandymount, Dublin 4					
St. Michael's Industrial School for Girls	Wexford					
St. Michael's Industrial School for Junior boys	Cappoquin, County Waterford		M			
St. Patrick's Industrial School	Kilkenny					
St. Patrick's Industrial School, Upton	County Cork					
St. Vincent's (House of Charity) Industrial School for Junior Boys	Drogheda, County Louth		M			
St. Vincent's Industrial School for Girls, Limerick	Limerick		F			
St. Vincent's Industrial School, Goldenbridge	Inchicore, Dublin 8					
Fisheries School	Baltimore, West Cork	Local parish priest and board of management	M		1950	After the school's closure its records were (allegedly deliberately) destroyed.

== Northern Ireland ==
The industrial schools in Northern Ireland were gradually closed and emptied in the 1920s and 1930s, and were effectively gone by 1950.

Institution	Location	Operated by	Sex admitted	Year established	Year disestablished	Notes
Balmoral Industrial School for Protestant Boys	Belfast, County Antrim		M			
Hampton House Industrial School for Protestant Girls	Belfast		F			
Lisnevin Training School	Millisle, County Down.					
The Malone Reformatory (Training School) Belfast	County Antrim		M			
Shamrock Lodge Industrial School	Belfast, County Antrim		F			
St. Patrick's Training School	Belfast, County Antrim					
