= Artane Band =

Irish marching band from northern Dublin

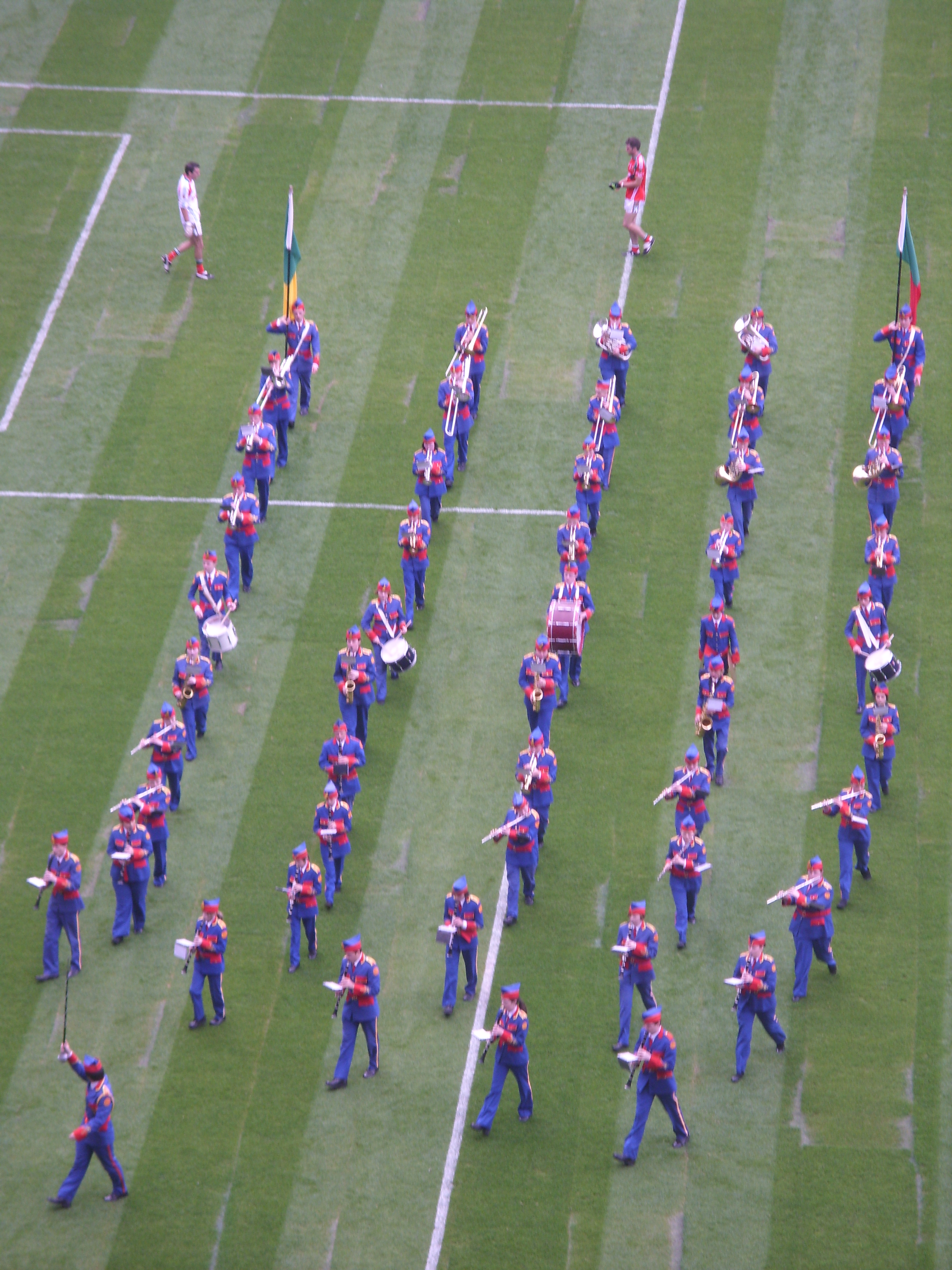
- School: Artane School of Music
- Location: St David's Park, Artane, Dublin, Ireland
- Founded: April 1871; 155 years ago
- Director: Ronan O'Reilly
- Website: artanemusic.ie

The Artane Band (Irish: Banna Ard Aidhin) is a marching band for young musicians based at the Artane School of Music in Artane, a northern suburb of Dublin, Ireland.

== Name ==
The band was originally called the Artane Boys Band, with members drawn from the pupils at Artane Industrial School, an industrial school which closed in 1969. Its name changed to "Artane Band" in 2004 when girls were first admitted.

== History ==
=== Foundation and ethos ===
The band was formed in 1872 and first performed in public in 1874 for the visiting Prince of Wales, later Edward VII. The band performed outside Ireland for the first time at the London Exhibition of 1884, and visited Aberdeen, Scotland in 1888 as part of the Irish Exhibition.

The band also played for Queen Victoria during her visit to the school in 1900 and performed for King George V in 1911 during his visit to Maynooth College in Maynooth, Ireland playing "God Save the King" among other selections. The band has also played for President John F. Kennedy, President Richard Nixon and President Bill Clinton during their state visits to Ireland. It became well known for playing at Croke Park at major matches of the Gaelic Athletic Association (GAA), playing before the match and at the half time interval, and leading the All-Ireland final teams' pre-match procession around the pitch. Its first GAA matches were on Whit Monday 1886 on playing fields on the North Circular Road, and the association encouraged spectators to sing "Amhrán na bhFiann" and other Irish songs to the band's accompaniment reflecting a commitment to cultural nationalism shared by the GAA and the Christian Brothers who ran the school.

The GAA invited the band to play at the 1947 All Ireland Football Final at the Polo Grounds in Upper Manhattan, New York after which they played in Boston. The band also played at Wembley Stadium in London in 1957 when it hosted its first GAA matches. In 1966, the band performed at a pageant in Croke Park hosted by the GAA and members of the band performed in Kilmainham Gaol as part of the commemorations of the 1916 Rising.

=== Artane Industrial School allegations ===
Allegations of historical child abuse at Artane Industrial School were publicised in the 1990s and confirmed by the 2009 report of the Commission to Inquire into Child Abuse. However, the commission's report said the band had been a positive experience for its members. Calls were made for the band to change its name to break the association with the discredited institution. As of 2016, the band management regarded its name as relating to the Artane district and not the defunct industrial school.

=== Later activities ===
The school moved to its the old refectory building after a fire in 1969 which damaged uniforms, instruments, and music scripts. The band was helped with donations from the GAA, donations of music (and arrangements) from other bands including the U.S. Navy and U.S. Marine Corps bands. In 1993, the band led the first Moscow St. Patrick's Day Parade. The band has also performed with Bing Crosby, Neil Diamond, Finbar Wright, and Frank Patterson.

The GAA joined the board of management of the school in 1998, with the foundation of the Artane School of Music Trust, and in 2002 girls became part of the band for the first time. In 2009, the school was awarded the Dublin Lord Mayors award for its services to the community by Lord Mayor Eibhlin Byrne and played at the Oxegen 2009 music festival.

In 2011, the band performed during Queen Elizabeth II's visit to Croke Park. The Artane Youth Choir for secondary school students began in 2015, in addition to the adult Artane Community Choir. In 2016, the organisation celebrated its "130 year partnership" with the GAA. In 2018, after "extensive renovations", the hall was officially reopened by the Lord Mayor of Dublin Nial Ring. In 2023, before the funeral of Shane MacGowan, the band played several of his songs as they led a procession of his coffin through the streets of Dublin.

== Other groups and activities ==
The Artane Senior Band was founded in 1988 to provide former youth members with the option to continue playing. Since 2000, the band has welcomed adults who had not previously been youth members of the Artane Band.

Since 2003, the Artane School of Music has provided instrument and vocal tuition to students on the performance module of the undergraduate degree in music at the Dublin City University (DCU) Mater Dei Centre. The Artane School of Music Annual Showcase is a concert performed every year. In 2019, the showcase event for the concert was held in the National Concert Hall.

== In popular culture ==
The drummer and co-founder of U2, Larry Mullen Jr, played with the (then) Artane Boys Band. The Hothouse Flowers saxophonist Leo Barnes and Robert Arkins of The Commitments, were also members of the band. Uniformed members of the band appear on the CD cover image of INXS' Welcome to Wherever You Are, a 1992 album, and in the music video for U2's 1998 single, "Sweetest Thing".

== Recordings ==
- The Music of Ireland (7-inch EP); The Artane Boys Band, conducted by J. W. Hickey; Connoisseur Records, 1975
- Hold My Hand / Amhran na bhFiann & The Sunday Game (7-inch EP); Artane Boys Band; Evergeen Records
- The Winds of Change (LP); The Artane Boys Band; Harmac Records; 1989
- Home of the Artane Boys Band (LP); The Artane Boys Band; Harp Records/Pickwick Recordings; 1982
- Ireland on the March (LP); The Artane Boys Band of Dublin / The Fintan Lalor Bagpipe Band of Dublin; Avoca Recordings Ltd., U.S.; 1968
