= Carriglea Park =

Industrial school in Dún Laoghaire, Ireland

Coordinates: 53.2798°N 6.1521°W

Carriglea Park was an industrial school in Dún Laoghaire, Ireland. The Christian Brothers purchased the property in 1893.

It was first certified as an industrial school in 1894 and started operating in 1896. It was operated as a residential training school for boys. Carriglea Park is located in Kill O'The Grange in south County Dublin, at the junction of Kill Avenue and Rochestown Avenue. The site is now the location of the Dún Laoghaire Institute of Art, Design and Technology, a third-level institute of technology with over 2000 students.

== History ==
The property originally consisted of a mansion named Ruby Hall and 40 acres (16 ha) of land, which was increased to 60 acres (24 ha) with the purchase of a nearby farm in 1896. In 1946, additional land was purchased for a secondary school. The 1946 addition nearly doubled the size of Carriglea Park, taking the estate to 115 acres (0.47 km^{2}) .

The intention when Carriglea was established was that it would be "Artane on a small scale".

The mansion was used as a residence for the Christian Brothers; a separate building was constructed for the boys' dormitory, dining room, kitchen, and classrooms.

=== Closure ===
The school officially closed on 30 June 1954.

At the same time as the Christian Brothers decided to close Carriglea Park, they also decided that boys under 14 whose offences would have resulted in a prison sentence for an adult would only be admitted to St Joseph's Industrial School, Letterfrack. This was strongly opposed by the Department of Education, the Department of Justice, and members of the judiciary, but the brothers were adamant and went ahead with the plan.

The Dún Laoghaire College of Art and Design moved to the site in the early 1980s, expanding into the Dún Laoghaire Institute of Art, Design and Technology (IADT) in 1997. Over the period of this expansion, several more buildings were constructed on the site.

== Commission to Inquire into Child Abuse ==
=== Physical abuse ===
In its investigation of abuse at Carriglea Park, the Commission to Inquire into Child Abuse concluded that when discipline in the school broke down, the Congregation of Christian Brothers had approved the appointment of a man known to practice excessive corporal punishment and that the Congregation considered this to be an appropriate approach to maintaining control.

=== Sexual abuse ===
The Commission concluded that there was a problem with abuse of boys by other boys. They also noted that a brother had been transferred from Artane Industrial school to Carriglea after concerns had been expressed about his friendship with a particular boy in Artane – this transfer was condemned as "ill-judged and dangerous".

Two specific brothers were noted as having histories of abuse. They were given the pseudonyms Brother Tristan and Brother Lancelin.

Brother Tristan was probably known to be an abuser by the order's General Council, but their response was to move him from one post to another (staying employed in the industrial school system). He had committed offences at Carriglea and Marino. The Commission found that the records of the General Council showed that they regarded his offences as being much more serious than their submission to the Commission had indicated.

Brother Lancelin's offences were serious enough to be described in the Congregation's records using language associated with criminal activity, contradicting the submission made by the Congregation to the Commission. The Commission described one offence in particular as a "serious case of sexual abuse". Unusually for the 1940s, the boys made written statements about the abuse.

=== Emotional abuse and neglect ===
The Commission described Carriglea Park as "dilapidated and run-down" for much of the period during which the allegations they were investigating took place. They noted in particular that the boys in residence were badly clothed and went barefoot in the summer despite adequate funds being available to the school.

=== Education and trades ===
Primary school education at Carriglea appeared to the Commission to have been of a high standard compared to schools generally.

The Commission praised the practice of preparing older boys for the Post Office exam, but regretted that the practice of sending brighter boys to the Christian Brothers secondary school in Dún Laoghaire had been discontinued in 1939.

The Commission noted that the trades selected for the training of older boys were for chosen the benefit of the institution, rather than the boys. They were also concerned that only two trades (boot-making and tailoring) were offered apart from farming. Consequently, boys in Carriglea were not provided with useful skills to support themselves after their time in the school.

=== General conclusions ===
The Commission made a number of significant findings:

- The Congregation had adequate funds to provide reasonable care for the boys sent to Carriglea, but did not use them for that purpose.
- Further, the Congregation made a considerable profit from closing Carriglea Park, but did not use it to benefit the boys in their charge.
- Chronic mismanagement and a harsh regime caused abuse.
- Discipline was enforced by harsh and violent means to introduce order, with no regard for the boys' welfare.
- Sexual abuse by two brothers was noted.
- Primary education was good, but trade preparation was poor.
