= Danny Ellis (musician) =

Irish singer-songwriter and author

Danny Ellis (born 18 July 1947) is an Irish singer-songwriter and author.

== Early life and education ==
Danny Ellis was born on 18 July 1947 in Dublin, Ireland. He was sent to the Artane Industrial school in 1955 until 1963. At Artane he joined the Artane Boys' Band.

== Career ==
As a professional trombonist, Ellis played with Irish showbands The Airchords (1964), The Jim Farley Band (1965-66), The Nevada Showband (1969), Dickie Rock's Miami Showband (1969-1971), and Stage 2 (1972-73). He also worked as a session singer in the famous Abbey road studios, recording demos for Les Reed. One of his recordings of a Les Reed song landed him in the English finals for Eurovision in 1989. In 2009 he released the album 800 Voices, an autobiographical account of his time in the Irish orphanage system. JPF, the largest independent music awards, honored him with the lyricist of the year award in 2009. His autobiography,"The Boy at the Gate", was released in September 2012 by Transworld, and reached no. 2 in Ireland for bestselling non-fiction. The book was released in the United States in September 2013.

== Discography ==
- This Tenderness (2004)
- 800 Voices (2010)
- The Space Between the Lines (2011)

== Published books ==
- The Boy at the Gate (2012) Published: Sept. 3, 2013; ISBN 978-1-61145-892-3 Publisher: Arcade
