= Diarmuid Whelan =

Irish historian

Diarmuid Whelan (11 August 1971 – 1 June 2010) was an Irish academic in the history department of UCC. Born in Cork, he studied at Christian Brothers College, Cork and UCC. He wrote his doctoral thesis on Conor Cruise O'Brien.

Besides his academic work, he had also been a sculptor and a transatlantic sailor. He worked in the National Library of Ireland archiving the papers of Owen Sheehy-Skeffington where he discovered a manuscript of Peter Tyrrell which he edited and had published as Founded on Fear: Letterfrack Industrial School, war and exile. He revealed that the Ryan Commission report had used the pseudonym 'Noah Kitterick' to refer to Peter Tyrrell.

He wrote Conor Cruise O'Brien: The Coldest Eye, a biography of Conor Cruise O'Brien.

His research interests were in Intellectual History, Irish political history, US Foreign policy, Decolonisation, Terrorism and International relations.

== Books ==
- Founded on Fear, Letterfrack, War and Exile, (Ed.), Irish Academic Press, reprinted by Transworld
- Gerald Goldberg: A tribute, Diarmuid Whelan (Ed.), Dermot Keogh (Ed.), June 2008, Mercier
- Conor Cruise O'Brien: The Coldest Eye, May 2009, Irish Academic Press
