= Eileen Kennedy (judge) =

Irish District Court judge

Justice of the District Court
- In office 1964–1983
- Nominated by: Government of Ireland
- Appointed by: Éamon de Valera

Personal details
- Born: 30 May 1914 Dublin
- Died: 11 October 1983 Galway, Ireland
- Profession: District Justice, Solicitor, Coroner

Eileen Kennedy (30 May 1914 – 11 October 1983) was an Irish District Court judge from Carrickmacross, County Monaghan. She was the first female judge in the Republic of Ireland when she was appointed to the District Court in 1964.

== Background ==
Kennedy was born in Dublin, to a notable legal family. She was the fourth child of solicitor Patrick J. Kennedy and his wife Delia. Her two brothers, John P. Kennedy and James Kennedy, were both solicitors, while John was also a District Justice and former Coroner for south Monaghan. Her father was a brother of the famous Wexford Gaelic football duo, Seán and Gus O'Kennedy.

Kennedy was brought up in Carrickmacross from 1918 and was educated in St Louis Convent. She trained as a nurse at St. Vincent's Hospital, Dublin, and practiced for 8 years from 1935, including service as an Army Nurse during the Emergency.

== Legal career ==
Kennedy qualified as a solicitor in 1947, and practiced in her father's firm in Carrickmacross. In 1960, she was appointed coroner for south Monaghan. She served as Coroner until she was appointed as the first female justice to the District Court in 1964, and as justice of the Metropolitan Children's Court. Her appearance in court was seen as something of a novelty at the time, and not just because she was female. She was also the first Justice to appear with their head uncovered and her court was crowded for days with people just attending to witness this.

In 1967 she was appointed by the Minister for Education, Donogh O'Malley to chair a committee to carry out a survey and report on the reformatory and industrial school systems. The report, which was published in 1970, was considered ground-breaking in many areas and came to be known as the Kennedy Report.

The Report made recommendations about a number of matters, including the Magdalene laundries, in relation to which they were not acted upon. The report recommended the closure of a number of reformatories, including the latterly infamous reformatory at Daingean, County Offaly.

In April 1970, Kennedy was appointed by Taoiseach Jack Lynch as a member the Commission on the Status of Women. This commission recommended the introduction of legislation to effect equal pay and the removal of the marriage bar.

== Death ==
Kennedy died in Galway Regional Hospital following a heart attack which she suffered on holiday in Connemara. She was 69 and was due to retire the following May.

== Cultural references ==
Kennedy is one of six notable Irishwomen, including Mary Robinson and Brenda Fricker, to feature in an Irish school book "Firsts For Irish Women - They Led the Way" from Poolbeg Press, as part of their "Heroes for Ireland" series.
