= Peter Tyrrell =

Irish writer and activist (1916–1967)

- The only known photograph of Tyrrell
- Born: 16 October 1916; Near Ballinasloe in County Galway, Ireland
- Died: 26 April 1967 (aged 50); Hampstead Heath, London
- Cause of death: Self-immolation
- Occupation: Tailor
- Writing career
- Language: English
- Notable work: Founded on Fear (published 2006)
- Military career
- Allegiance: United Kingdom
- Branch: British Army
- Service years: 1935-1945
- Rank: Sergeant
- Unit: King's Own Scottish Borderers
- Conflicts: World War II

Peter Tyrrell (16 October 1916 – 26 April 1967) was an Irish tailor, author and activist against child abuse. When he was eight years old, the authorities committed him and his older brothers to St Joseph's Industrial School, Letterfrack, an institution run by the Christian Brothers, because of the family's extreme poverty. There, he was physically and sexually abused by several of the Christian Brothers, until he was released from the school when he was sixteen years old. He became a tailor (he had been taught the trade in Letterfrack), emigrated to the United Kingdom in 1935 and in the same year enlisted in the British Army. He was stationed in India for most of his military service, but in 1944 was removed to Geilenkirchen, Germany where he was wounded and captured by the Nazis. For four months in early 1945, he was held as a prisoner-of-war in the German camp Stalag XI-B, which he found pleasant compared to Letterfrack.

After the war, back in England, he gained employment at the Ministry of Supply; after being laid off in 1947, he travelled extensively around the country. Upon reuniting with an old friend from Letterfrack, he became obsessed with his experiences at the institution. Throughout the 1950s and '60s, Tyrrell campaigned against corporal punishment and child abuse in industrial schools. He wrote letters to Catholic church leaders, Christian Brothers, newspapers, and government officials. In 1958 he met Irish Senator Owen Sheehy-Skeffington and began a correspondence with him, which lasted seven years. At Sheehy-Skeffington's behest, between August 1958 and February 1959, Tyrrell wrote an autobiography, which contained narratives of not only the abuse he suffered as a child at Letterfrack, but of the other stages of his life as well. It was never published within their lifetimes.

Having suffered depression and feeling that his efforts to enact change were unsuccessful, in 1967 Tyrrell burnt himself alive on Hampstead Heath in London. His remains went unidentified until 1968. In 2006, his autobiography was posthumously published, as Founded on Fear, by the Irish Academic Press. Historian Diarmuid Whelan had discovered the manuscript in the papers of Sheehy-Skeffington, who died in 1970. On 26 April 2019, a candlelight vigil was held on Hampstead Heath in Tyrrell's memory.

== Early life ==
Peter Tyrrell was born on 16 October 1916, the eighth child of James Tyrrell and Mary Cronin, near Ballinasloe in County Galway, Ireland. His parents had met at the October Ballinasloe Fair. Cronin, who was not from a poor background, hailed from County Roscommon. Peter had nine siblings including Jack, Jim, Joe, Laurence, Martin, Mick, Norah and Paddy. The Tyrrells were extremely impoverished because James Tyrrell held only an intermittent job, for 15 shillings a week, as a stone-breaker. He liked to help his neighbours but neglected to improve his own family's finances and living conditions, so the children stole crops from their neighbours' fields and Mary begged to support the family. Relatives who were residing in Boston, Massachusetts sent them money. Despite living on a farm with chickens, ducks, two goats, a horse and a donkey, the family rarely had enough food, because James Tyrrell did not till the farmland. Their house (originally a stable) had a cobblestone floor, no windows and only two rooms. James Tyrrell neglected to make repairs or renovations to the house.

The Tyrrell children went to school in Ahascragh; Tyrrell recalled that their teacher, Mrs Kennedy, was a pleasant woman who provided lunch for them. However, after running out of clothing, they had to withdraw in 1923. In 1924, because of the family's poverty, the Garda Síochána removed him and three of his older brothers to St Joseph's Industrial School in Letterfrack, a boys' industrial school operated and staffed by the Congregation of Christian Brothers. Industrial schools were institutions, run by religious orders, intended to care for and educate orphans, neglected children, abandoned children, children convicted of criminal offences and children from impoverished families. Tyrrell's two younger brothers, who were too young for Letterfrack, were instead put in a Kilkenny industrial school for junior boys but transferred to Letterfrack once they came of age.

=== Letterfrack ===
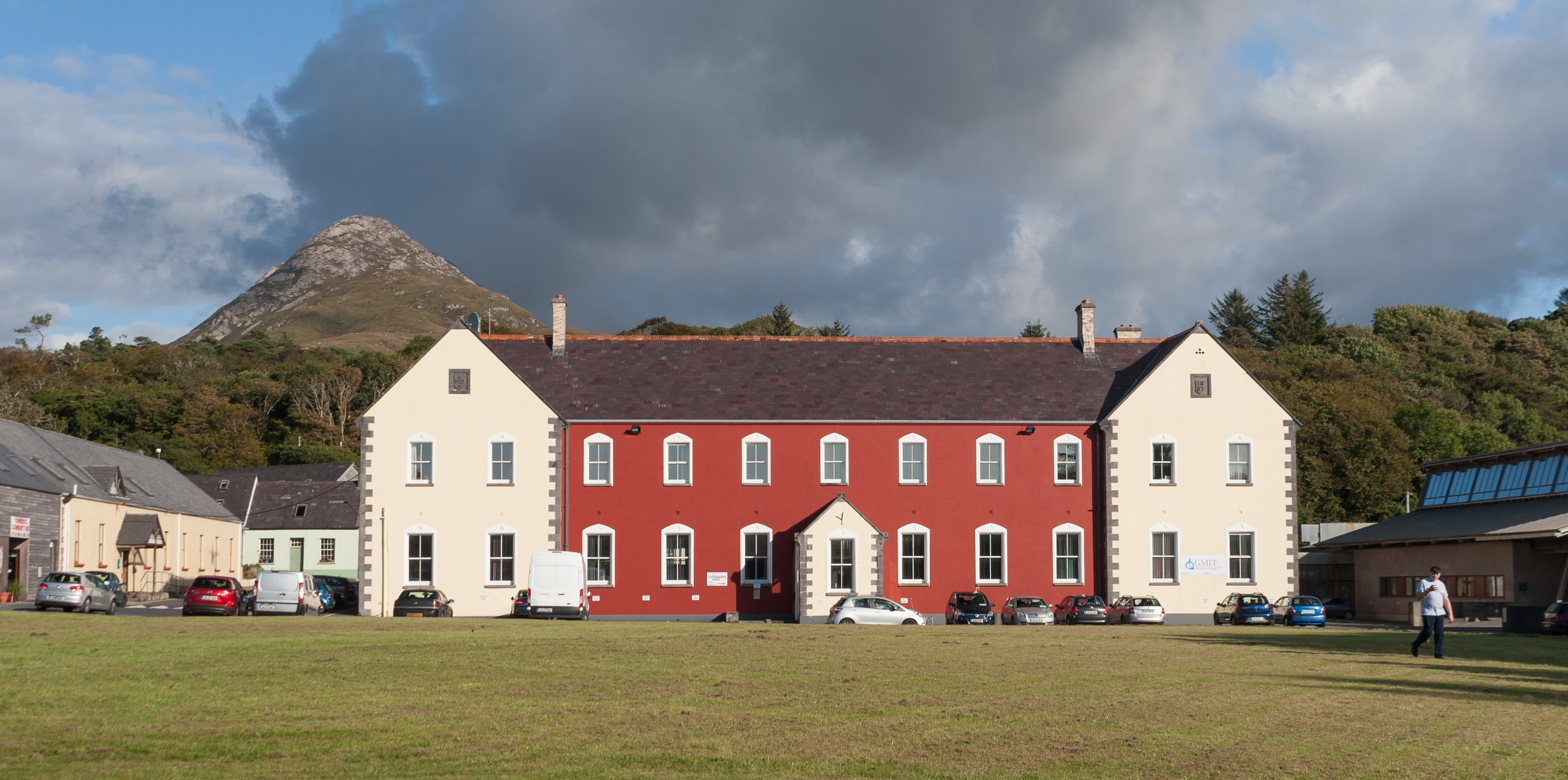
The former St Joseph's Industrial School, where Tyrrell and his older brothers were sent

Tyrrell later recounted in Founded on Fear that many of the Christian Brothers who ran the school beat him and the other inmates daily, with the exception of holidays such as Christmas, only for the Brothers' "lustful pleasure". One Brother in particular, Vale (or Veale), made Letterfrack a "nightmare" for Tyrrell. The Christian Brothers usually approached the boys from behind in order to beat them, taking them by surprise, and used, among other implements, sticks, leather and rubber. Boys would be struck up to 20 times during a single beating. Once, Tyrrell was coerced to fabricate to a doctor a story of having broken his arm in a fall down the stairs; in actuality, it had been broken in a beating. Sexual abuse also occurred; the children were often stripped naked before being beaten, and Tyrrell later reported to the political think tank Tuairim that a Brother, who may have been Vale, had raped him. In Founded on Fear, however, Tyrrell never explicitly described sexual abuse, leading historian Diarmuid Whelan to speculate that it was probably "isolated... to a handful of occasions". On the other hand the Commission to Inquire into Child Abuse concluded in its report that sexual abuse in Letterfrack was "a chronic problem".

Students from poor families were bullied by their peers and received targeted abuse from staff. The boys were forced to make goods for each other and for customers outside of the school. Although he preferred shoemaking, Tyrrell was among several inmates assigned to the tailor shop, where he learned how to tailor. He sewed two layers of fabric into his trousers' seat in order to make the beatings less painful. The food, sanitation and living conditions were poor: the boys were perpetually cold due to malnutrition and the building's lack of heating, many suffered from chilblains and periodontal disease, and head lice were commonplace because the staff neglected to wash the boys' school uniforms regularly. Tyrrell related, though, that some of the Brothers, like the school's superior Brother Kelly, treated the boys well. He described Kelly as "kind to everyone" but oblivious to the extent of the abuse going on in the school, and claimed that Kelly would have intervened had he been informed. Tyrrell's parents lacked the money to travel to visit him and his brothers, though they sent him letters.

=== Release and aftermath ===
In 1932, at the age of sixteen, Tyrrell was discharged from St Joseph's and returned home. James Tyrrell had renovated the house since his sons' departures (a concrete floor had replaced the cobblestone one, and windows had been added); however, Peter's eldest brother Mick built a new house into which the family moved sometime thereafter. Immediately after his return, Peter was hired as a tailor in Ballinasloe, where he sewed garments for a local mental hospital, several of whose patients were former industrial school inmates. Tyrrell reported that, for several years after his release, he startled easily, preferred to sit with his back against a wall out of fear of being beaten, avoided communicating with most people except for his mother and fell ill frequently. He remarked that he had a tendency to agree, out of fear that he might be harmed otherwise, with everything other people said. Because the people who mistreated him were men, Tyrrell stated that he had "never met a bad woman. I have not known many good men. I dislike and fear men". He had nightmares in which he was beaten, which induced in him a fear of sleep. Tyrrell once confided about his past in a priest, who expressed appallment that he complained about the Christian Brothers, as they had provided for his necessities.

== Military career ==
Tyrrell emigrated to the United Kingdom in 1935 because of prejudice by local people against former inmates of industrial schools, which alienated him from Irish society. Later that year he joined the King's Own Scottish Borderers regiment of the British Army. He was stationed first in Britain and then sent to various other regions, including Palestine in August 1936, where the regiment "protect[ed] Jewish settlements and... provided escorts for all trains", and Tiberias, where he contracted malaria and spent two weeks in a hospital in Egypt. In September 1937 the regiment took a ship to India. In 1941, he and his battalion were attached to an Australian unit at Bombay with the task of escorting Italian prisoners of war, who had been transported to India, to Bangalore. He was promoted to the rank of sergeant in June of the same year. In 1942, he began a romantic relationship with a woman named Angela Dennison, whom he met in India. But they ultimately broke up because of Tyrrell's hesitance to marry her, as well as several instances, including one where he forced her to return a watch that he had gifted her a few weeks prior, in which he mistreated her. While stationed in India he had a tendency to mistreat the Indians when he was upset; he later remarked that these behaviours of his were similar to those of the Christian Brothers at Letterfrack.

In 1944, the battalion was removed to the Netherlands and later to Geilenkirchen in Germany. On the front lines at the German border on 21 January 1945, Tyrrell incurred minor wounds to his right arm and to his legs, whereupon he was captured by the Germans and sent to the prisoner-of-war camp Stalag XI-B near Fallingbostel. He compared his experience at the camp, where the German officers were civil and non-violent towards him and the other Western prisoners, favourably to his childhood in Letterfrack. He attributed the meagre food to wartime scarcity, for which he did not fault Germany, and not intentional withholdment. He and other prisoners were liberated in April 1945. He was demobilised from the military in December and officially discharged six months later.

== Postwar life and activism ==
Tyrrell's military service had helped him recover from much of his trauma and gain self-confidence. After returning to England he learnt how to drive a car, ride a bicycle and swim. He lived primarily in London. In 1945, he obtained a job as a clothing inspector at the Ministry of Supply. He wrote that he "was beginning to really enjoy life. I was no longer afraid of people. I had learned to cast aside that terrible inferiority complex... Yes I had beaten most of my fears". But he also faced both anti-Irish sentiment and, because of his outspoken criticism of the Irish people and culture, rejection by the Irish community in England. He held speeches in Hyde Park about Ireland's faults; in multiple incidents he was physically assaulted and threatened for doing so, and once he was pulled from a soapbox. He resented the Irish for what he saw as their undying loyalty to religious institutions including the Christian Brothers, and for giving all Irish people reputations in the United Kingdom as "irresponsible liars and drunkards".

After he was laid off from the Ministry of Supply in 1947, he started tailoring again, and began to travel extensively around the United Kingdom, frequently changing addresses, in search of work. By this point, individual tailors were no longer in demand in most places in the country, because of the advent of mass clothing production in factories. After encountering Tom Thornton, one of his old friends from Letterfrack, his experiences at the institution became an obsession for him. He frequented pubs, met many fellow former inmates of industrial schools and attempted, with varying success, to gain their recollections. His inclination to take paper and pens to the pub gave him the nickname "the professor". He wrote letters to newspapers (including the News of the World), government officials (including statesman Éamon de Valera), Catholic Church leaders and Christian Brothers, recounting the abuse he had experienced in Letterfrack and imploring them to investigate into child abuse in industrial schools. He usually received either no response to his correspondence, or a reassurance that his abuse had happened long enough to have become a moot point. In two letters, neither of which received a response, to the Superior of the Congregation of Letterfrack, he accused three members of the order of physical and sexual abuse; in the Ryan Report these men were anonymised to "Brother Piperel", "Brother Perryn" (real name Brother Vale) and "Brother Corvax". In 1957 he met with the Provincial of the Congregation, who dismissed his allegations as blackmail, and then with the Superior General of Letterfrack.

In the autumn of 1958, Tyrrell wrote to Owen Sheehy-Skeffington, an Irish Senator who was known for his opposition to corporal punishment, on the recommendation of the Irish Centre in London. Sheehy-Skeffington, uniquely, believed and became interested in Tyrrell's story. They met in person for the only time at Sheehy-Skeffington's house in Dublin, and kept corresponding until 1965. At Sheehy-Skeffington's encouragement, Tyrrell spent August 1958 to February 1959 writing a memoir, which was published decades posthumously as Founded on Fear. Sometime in the early 1960s Tyrrell, due to worsening eyesight, quit tailoring and obtained a job assisting underground train passengers in London. Sheehy-Skeffington introduced Tyrrell to Joy Rudd, with whom Tyrrell then co-authored an article titled "Early Days in Letterfrack", which was published in the June 1963 issue of Hibernia magazine. Rudd introduced Tyrrell into a literary and political group called Tuairim which published pamphlets on Ireland's social issues. Tuairim put Tyrrell on the committee that wrote their 1966 pamphlet (Some of our children. A report on the residential care of the deprived child in Ireland) about living conditions in Irish institutions for children. To his frustration, the pamphlet omitted his recollections; Tuairim thought that abuse in industrial schools had become less severe since Tyrrell had left Letterfrack.

== Death ==
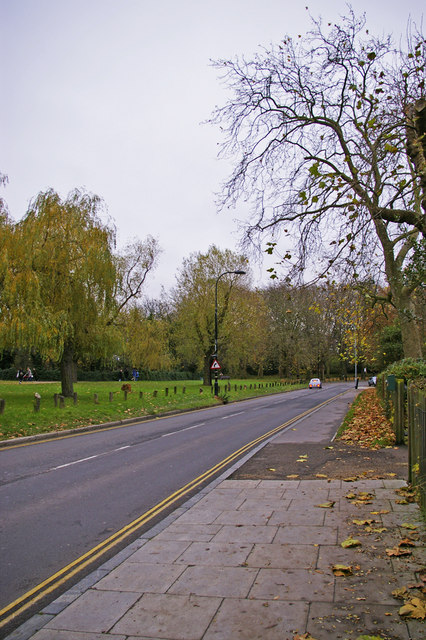
East Heath Road in 2008

On 26 April 1967, Tyrrell, disgruntled by the failure of his attempts to bring the issue of child abuse to the public eye, went to an area (near East Heath Road) of Hampstead Heath in London, poured a flammable liquid over his body and lit himself on fire. He was fifty years old. He suffered from depression and possibly bipolar disorder as a consequence of his abuse, and he had previously contemplated suicide in 1939.

His corpse, charred beyond recognition, was discovered, still smouldering, on 28 April by park staff member Robert Forsdyke. While there was no weapon at the scene, the body had possible stab wounds to the abdomen. Investigators initially believed the corpse to have been of a man between 20 and 30 years old. The only clue as to his identity was a torn postcard, addressed to Sheehy-Skeffington, next to the body; the head investigator, Raymond Dagg, stated that written on the postcard was a suicide note.

Scotland Yard opened an inquest into Tyrrell's death and, in 1968, contacted Sheehy-Skeffington inquiring about the postcard. Sheehy-Skeffington sent them a letter from Tyrrell for them to use as comparison, and Scotland Yard positively identified the remains as Tyrrell shortly thereafter. Scotland Yard later reorganised its records and, in the process, destroyed the documentation of its inquest.

== Legacy ==
=== Founded on Fear ===
In 2005, 38 years after Tyrrell's death, Irish historian Diarmuid Whelan, who was going through the archives of Owen Sheehy-Skeffington's papers, came across the manuscript of Tyrrell's autobiography. He edited it to fix Tyrrell's idiosyncratic grammar (Tyrrell started random words with capital letters and used commas incorrectly), wrote an introduction to it and had the book published as Founded on Fear: Letterfrack Industrial School, war and exile by the Irish Academic Press in 2006. Founded on Fear received positive reviews from journalist Mary Raftery and historian Daire Keogh. After Founded on Fear's publication, the Congregation of Christian Brothers apologised for the abuse in industrial schools and for ignoring Tyrrell's complaints in the 1950s.

=== Commission to Inquire into Child Abuse report ===
Tyrrell's correspondence and meetings with the Christian Brothers were documented on 20 May 2009 in the report (known as the "Ryan Report") by the Commission to Inquire into Child Abuse, even though his case was out of the scope of the report (which mainly concerned incidents that occurred after the year 1936). The Commission had been established by the Irish government in 2000 to investigate child abuse in industrial schools in the Republic of Ireland. The Commission included Tyrrell in the report because they thought the Christian Brothers' dismissals of Tyrrell's allegations to be noteworthy. The Commission found Tyrrell's information about the identities of Letterfrack's staff and residents, during his time there, to be accurate to the school's records; and discovered no evidence against his allegations of abuse. Since the Commission decided that victims and alleged perpetrators needed to be anonymised for legal reasons, Tyrrell was referred to as "Noah Kitterick" in the report. In a column for the Irish Examiner, published three days after the Ryan Report, Whelan identified "Noah Kitterick" as Peter Tyrrell. Because Tyrrell had stated a wish for his efforts to be appreciated under his real name, Whelan condemned the Commission's decision to anonymise him.

=== 2019 vigil at Hampstead Heath ===
On 26 April 2019, a vigil, organised by therapist Nuala Flynn, was held on Hampstead Heath in honour of Tyrrell. It consisted of a walk, lit by candles, across Hampstead Heath, from Parliament Hill to the civic hall of Highgate. At the civic hall, Flynn recited passages from Founded on Fear and from the speeches Tyrrell gave. The vigil commemorated the 52nd anniversary of his death and the 10th anniversary of the publication of the Ryan Report. Many of the attendees were themselves former inmates of industrial schools.

== See also ==
- List of political self-immolations
- Mary Raftery – Irish journalist who covered abuse in industrial schools
- Henk Heithuis – Dutch victim of sexual abuse in a Catholic boarding school

== Works cited ==
- Tyrrell, Peter (2008). Whelan, Diarmuid (ed.). Founded on Fear. Dublin: Transworld Ireland. ISBN 978-1-84827-023-7.
- Fagan, Sean; McConvery, Brendan; Lee, Margaret; Keogh, Daire; Prone, Terry; O'Malley, Tom; Dorr, Donal; Littleton, John; Maher, Eamon; Ryan, Fainche; O'Riordan, Joe; Keenan, Marie (2009). Flannery, Tony (ed.). Responding to the Ryan Report. Blackrock, Co. Dublin [Ireland]: Columba Press. ISBN 978-1-85607-673-9.
- Arnold, Bruce (2009). The Irish gulag: how the state betrayed its innocent children. Dublin: Gill & Macmillan. ISBN 978-0-7171-4614-7.
