= Patrick Lynch (economist) =

Irish economist

Patrick Lynch MRIA (5 May 1917 – 16 November 2001) was an Irish economist. He believed in economic development and the co-ordination of government policy, including fiscal, social and monetary measures to invest in education and joining the European Economic Community. He favoured empirical education economics in Ireland and development economics flowing from investment in science.

He was " ... one of the most respected and influential social and economic thinkers during the critical period of the Sixties, when Ireland's economic foundations were laid."

A professor of Political Economy at University College Dublin until 1980, he was a civil servant for over a decade, served as chairman of Aer Lingus and Aer Rianta and was deputy chairman of AIB Group.

== Early life ==
Born in Dublin in 1917, Patrick Lynch was the first-born child of Daniel and Brigid Lynch.

He was educated at Catholic University School, a feeder school for University College Dublin (UCD). He entered UCD in 1935 to study humanities, at which he excelled. During this time, he was inclined to accept the ideas of Alfred Marshall and John Maynard Keynes.

== Civil Service, 1941 - 1952 ==
Patrick joined the civil service in 1941, starting in the Department of Finance and staying there until 1948. After two years seconded as private secretary to Taoiseach John A. Costello, he was appointed Assistant Secretary to the inter-party government in 1950 and he continued in this post when Fianna Fáil attained sole power in 1951. He and Alexis Fitzgerald (Costello's son-in-law) had persuaded Costello to adopt a Keynesian approach to the country's economic policy in 1948, the first major change to Irish economic policy for "a generation", as Murphy phrased it, and one which was achieved despite opposition from both the Department of Finance and the Central Bank.

Lynch's viewpoint on the relationship between the state, the people and the economy is evidenced in a speech he wrote for Costello in 1949:

"the government must budget primarily to allocate a certain part of the nation's finances to public purposes, but must also ensure that the resources of the nation are utilised in the way which can best advance the interests of the community ...[A]s long ago as 1936, the late Lord Keynes declared that the duty of ordering the current volume of investment cannot safely be left in private hands."

In 1958, T. K. Whitaker consulted Lynch while drafting Economic Development, the report that outlined the basis for the First Programme for Economic Expansion.

== Academic career, 1952 - 1980 ==
He left the civil service in 1952, returning to UCD as a lecturer in economics. This was at least in part due to the persuasions of Professor George O'Brien, the man credited with introducing the theories of Keynes to Ireland. He was elected a Fellow Commoner of Peterhouse, Cambridge for 1955–56, where he formed a friendship with John Vaizey, and then returned to UCD. Some sources reference other years in the early 1950s for his time at Peterhouse; the years used here are those from the records of the college.

Between 1966 and 1975, he was associate professor of Political Economy (Applied Economics). He then held the post of Professor of Economics until 1980, at which time he retired and was appointed Professor Emeritus, a title he held until his death in 2001. He was a member of the Governing Body of UCD from 1964 to 1976 and of the Seanad Éireann as a representative of the National University of Ireland from 1972 to 1977.

In the 1970s ,he set up the Science Policy Research Unit at UCD, in conjunction with colleagues from the Science Faculty.

He received honorary doctorates from Brunel University (1976), from the University of Dublin (Trinity College, Dublin) (1979), from the National University of Ireland (1985), the University of Limerick (1994), and from the National Council of Education Awards in 2000.

== Involvements in business from 1954 ==
Lynch's interest in aviation focused on his support of the state airline Aer Lingus. In 1954, he was appointed chairman of that business and of Aer Rianta, the "ground side" operation which looked after airport facilities. During his 21-year tenure the companies went from reporting financial losses to being profitable enterprises. He retired from the positions in 1975.

In 1959, Lynch became a director of the Provincial Bank of Ireland, which later became part of AIB. He was made a director of the AIB Group bank in 1971 and served as deputy chairman from 1975 to 1984, as the bank begun to expand overseas into the UK, US and Europe. As a senior director of the bank he was called to give evidence in the Moriarty Tribunal, an investigation into corruption involving Charles Haughey and which in part looked into why the bank had written-off a £1 million overdraft liability in Haughey's name.

== Public service ==
Lynch had written favourably of an early Irish socialist, William Thompson of Cork, in a 1946 article for The Bell. Thompson had proposed a labour theory of value before Karl Marx. In turn, Lynch's critiques of Irish capitalism appealed to the Tuairim group in the 1950s and were published by them.

Lynch believed in a positive role for the State in the promotion of economic and social development; that is, he favoured intervention and influence by the state in order to achieve those goals rather than adopting a laissez-faire approach. He was a member of the Capital Investment Advisory Committee during the 1950s, the body that established the use of the tax system as the principal mechanism for developing the Irish economy.

He acted as economic consultant to the Department of Finance and directed and acted as chairman of two major surveys sponsored by the Irish government and the Organisation for Economic Co-operation and Development (OECD) between 1962 - 1966.

- The first of these was a survey on long term Irish educational needs which resulted in publication of Investment in Education. He later insisted that this report concentrated on identifying the inefficiencies in the prevalent system rather than on policy and that it made only one policy recommendation, but its influence has been frequently claimed to have mould the future direction of education in Ireland for many years subsequently. Specifically, it brought about a change in policies such that education became more closely aligned with the requirements of the labour market.
- The second survey looked at the requirements of the Irish economy in respect of scientific research, development and technology; this resulted in the publication of Science and Irish Economic Development. A part of this report focussed on the issues of energy economics: Ireland relied on imports of oil and gas but had plentiful reserves of turf.

His co-author in the latter report was H. M. S. Miller, an English engineer who at the time headed the Research & Development department of Bord na Mona, the peat development board. The pair privately admitted at that time to being influenced by the Marxist-based ideas of J D Bernal whose 1939 book The Social Function of Science was influential in science policy analysis. They did not think it wise to publicly announce this at the time, although it was as a consequence of this, and the OECD report itself, that Lynch set up the Science Policy Research Unit at UCD, referred to above. Johnston has called the report "somewhat scathing" of the then Irish policy but also believes that, although the outcome was the establishment of the National Science Council in 1969, that body was fundamentally flawed as a consequence of its membership being state appointees. Lynch spent nearly ten years working on that Council.

He was a long-serving chairman and member of many other Irish Government commissions and committees: the National Industrial and Economic Council (later, the National Economic and Social Council), the Public Service Advisory Council; the Medico-Social Research Board, the Economic and Social Research Institute, the Institute of Public Administration and the Higher Education Authority among them. He was also Patron of the British-Irish Association and many of the early European Union advisory groups such as the Executive Council of the European Science Foundation.

In 1973 he became the first member from Ireland of the Club of Rome, whose 100 members were drawn from among scientists, humanists, economists, sociologists, educators and civil servants of Europe. At this time the Club was warning governments about the limits of non-renewable natural resources and the need therefore either to contain population growth or devise alternative resources, most notably in the book The Limits to Growth.

He became founder chairman of the National Library Society of Ireland in 1969. Between 1973 and 1976, he was chairman of the Institute of Public Administration (Ireland).

Lynch was a member of the Royal Irish Academy, of which he was vice-president in 1971-72 and treasurer between 1972 and 1980.

== Civil rights ==
Lynch was chairman of the Irish Anti-Apartheid Movement in the early 1970s, while chairman of Aer Lingus. During the same period he contributed to the Irish Council for Civil Liberties and the Movement for Peace in Ireland.

== Selected bibliography ==
- Lynch, Patrick (1969). "The Irish Economy since the War, 1946-1951". In Nowland, Kevin B. Nowlan; Williams, T. Desmond (eds.). Ireland in the War Years and After, 1939-1951. Dublin: Gill and Macmillan.
- Lynch, Patrick; Vaizey, John (1960). Guinness's Brewery Irish Economy, 1759-1876. Cambridge: Cambridge University Press. ISBN 0-521-05615-2.
- Lynch, Patrick (Autumn 1979). "Whither Science Policy". Administration. 27 (3). Dublin: Institute of Public Administration (Ireland).
- Lynch, Patrick (1966). "The Social Revolution That Never Was". In Williams, Desmond (ed.). The Irish Struggle 1916-1926. London: Routledge Keegan and Paul.
- Chubb, Basil; Lynch, Patrick (1969). "Economic development and planning". Readings in Irish Public Administration. Vol. 1. Dublin: Institute of Public Administration (Ireland).
- Lynch, Patrick; Meenan, James (1987). Essays in memory of Alexis FitzGerald. Dublin: Incorporated Law Society of Ireland.
