= Tuairim =

Irish think tank (1954–1975)

- Formation: 26 February 1954; 72 years ago
- Founders: Donal Barrington; Patrick Kilroy
- Founded at: Dublin, Ireland
- Dissolved: 1975; 51 years ago
- Type: Think tank
- Locations: Ireland; United Kingdom

Tuairim (Irish for "opinion") was an Irish think tank founded in 1954, by Donal Barrington and Patrick Kilroy, to facilitate discussion among young people about Ireland's societal issues. At its height in the early 1960s it had about a thousand members, and thirteen chapters (or branches) in Ireland and the United Kingdom. The public's changing interests caused Tuairim to decline in the mid-to-late 1960s, and its last branch dissolved in 1975.

== Structure and activities ==
Tuairim's thirteen branches were in Dublin, London, Cork, Limerick, Birmingham, Belfast, Galway, Tralee, Athlone, Clonmel, Waterford, Sligo and Nenagh. Tuairim had a central council comprising a president, vice president, secretary and treasurer. The branches, each of which had a chairperson and a number of additional representatives (proportional to the number of members of the branch), would vote in the council's officers, usually on an annual basis. The council, alone, made major decisions for Tuairim and interpreted its constitution.

Members had to be at least 21 and, prior to 1966, no older than 40, as the group was supposed to be a forum for the younger generation of Ireland. An "educated elite" comprised most of them, but several were not wealthy. Most members were Catholic liberals. Members were required to prove themselves sceptical enough to join, by suggesting a solution, during a Tuairim meeting, to a social problem about which they had written a paper for Tuairim. Many of its London chapter's members were Irish emigrants to the United Kingdom. In Tuairim's later history, the proportion of women in its membership grew larger.

Tuairim convened each month from September to May; held study weekends, during which members could investigate issues; and split off, during the study weekends, into research groups that collaborated on pamphlets. The pamphlets were usually based on papers written by members interested in a certain topic. Tuairim disseminated its ideas by publishing articles, which were approved or declined by its president, through periodicals and newspapers; and by hosting lectures with themes inspired by its "Tuairim Extern Lecture" scheme.

=== Political stances ===
Tuairim wanted the Irish educational system to be reformed; they argued that the Catholic Church should be divested of its control of education, and that children should leave school at no younger than sixteen. In 1966 a research group of the London branch published a pamphlet, Some of our children: a report on the residential care of the deprived child in Ireland, reporting on the living conditions in industrial schools. Despite receiving input from Peter Tyrrell, a member of the research group, who recounted physical and sexual abuse he suffered while in Letterfrack in the 1920s, Tuairim did not describe abuse in the report, because they believed that the treatment of children in industrial schools had improved since then; some writers, like Mary Raftery and Mavis Arnold, have in retrospect condemned this omission. Because it would have caused "educational apartheid and family divisions", the Department of Health rejected a proposal by Tuairim to put the children of Irish Travellers in special schools.

Tuairim opposed strict censorship, which the Irish government had imposed since the 1920s on "indecent" literature, and backed the authors of banned books.

== History ==
Tuairim was founded, with the purpose of finding solutions to Ireland's current "political, economic, social and cultural problems" without undue sway by religious organisations and political parties, in Dublin, Ireland in 1954 by solicitor Patrick Kilroy and barrister (later Judge of the Supreme Court and Judge of the European Court) Donal Barrington. The group, which consisted initially of fifteen university graduates, first convened in Jury's Hotel on 26 February of that year. Tuairim's terms, written by Kilroy and Barrington prior to that meeting, mandated that members be at least 21 and at most 40; members who joined while young enough but "aged out" tended to leave. People older than 40 were nonetheless occasionally admitted. In protest of a campaign by Maria Duce to enshrine as the "one true church" the Catholic Church, agreement with the Irish Constitution's 40th through 45th Articles was another requirement. Tuairim expressed no allegiance toward any particular ideology, and its members' political views were various; its founders, though, did not want "right-wing Catholics nor communists" to join.

A number of Tuairim branches in Ireland and the United Kingdom were established in the late 1950s and early 1960s with the assistance of one of its members, Lean Scully, who recruited people from around Ireland and the United Kingdom into the group. Tuairim was at its zenith, when it had about a thousand members across thirteen branches (including the original one in Dublin), in the early 1960s. From 1958 to 1970 sixteen pamphlets, which discussed social problems and proposed ways to solve them, were released by Tuairim. In 1966 Tuairim rewrote its constitution. The new one partially lifted the upper age limit, so that those older than 40 could, though still barred from the roles of chairperson and of council member, join the group; and, since the failure of Maria Duce's campaign had made them unnecessary, removed mentions of the Irish Constitution's Articles 40-45.

Tuairim's membership and productivity declined in the mid-1960s and 1970s. Since more people were attending higher education, and therefore becoming specialised in their interests, intellectual organisations, like Tuairim, that were indiscriminate in their subject matter lost their appeal and were supplanted by organisations founded to achieve specific goals. The increasing preference in newspapers for investigative over political journalism and the rise of other organisations, like Radio Telefis Eireann (which unlike Tuairim utilised the fashionable media of television and radio), accelerated the organisation's decline. Tuairim's attempts, among them an essay-writing contest and an advertisement campaign, to recruit new youth failed. Participation fell too low for Tuairim's branches to keep carrying out their tasks and hosting activities as regularly as they previously could, so they began to close. Tuairim's last branches in Dublin, Limerick and Cork shuttered respectively in 1973, 1974 and 1975.

While many "thoughtful contributions to intellectual debate" were made by Tuairim for going against Ireland's ideological orthodoxy, the group failed, according to John Horgan, to greatly affect Irish government policy in the immediate. Some of its proposals were realised years or decades after its dissolution; for example, parts of a "new Children Act", which would have improved how children in care were treated, were made statute in 1991. Many of Tuairim's members were, or would become, politicians or public officials.

== Notable members ==
- Donal Barrington, its cofounder. Barrington, who chaired the Dublin chapter, left in the early 1960s.
- Garret FitzGerald
- David Thornley, who was also a Dublin branch chairman.
- Peter Tyrrell, who was in the research group, in the London branch, that wrote Tuairim's 1966 pamphlet on living conditions in industrial schools.

== Works cited ==
- Finn, Tomás (2014). Tuairim, intellectual debate and policy formulation: rethinking Ireland, 1954-75. Manchester ; New York: Manchester University Press. ISBN 978-0-7190-9543-6.
- FitzGerald, Garret (2003). Reflections on the Irish state. Dublin: Irish Academic Press. ISBN 978-0-7165-2775-6.
