= Donal Barrington =

Irish Supreme Court justice from 1996 to 2000

Judge of the Supreme Court
- In office 1 June 1996 – 24 June 2000
- Nominated by: Government of Ireland
- Appointed by: Mary Robinson

Judge of the European Court of Justice
- In office 21 June 1989 – 27 May 1996
- Nominated by: Government of Ireland
- Appointed by: European Council

Judge of the High Court
- In office 14 March 1979 – 20 June 1989
- Nominated by: Government of Ireland
- Appointed by: Patrick Hillery

Personal details
- Born: 28 February 1928 Glasnevin, Dublin, Ireland
- Died: 3 January 2018 (aged 89) Merrion Road, Dublin, Ireland
- Spouse: Eileen Barrington (m. 1959)
- Children: 4
- Education: University College Dublin

Donal Patrick Michael Barrington (28 February 1928 – 3 January 2018) was an Irish judge who served as a Judge of the Supreme Court from 1996 to 2000, a Judge of the European Court of Justice from 1989 to 1996 and a Judge of the High Court from 1979 to 1989.

He was known to be an advocate for progressive policies, and founded the Tuairim think-tank in 1954. He was also the first President of the Irish Human Rights Commission.

As a barrister, he was a key advocate for social change. He successfully represented May McGee, in the landmark 1973 case over the ban on importing contraceptives in Ireland, in which the Supreme Court ruled that the ban infringed on married couples' right to privacy. He was appointed a High Court judge in 1979 and subsequently a judge of the Court of First Instance of the Court of Justice of the European Communities in 1989.

== Early life ==
Barrington was born in North Dublin, the fifth child of Thomas Barrington, a principal officer in the Department of Agriculture and native of Ennistymon, County Clare, and Eileen, a daughter of J. K. Bracken and sister of Brendan Bracken, 1st Viscount Bracken. His father died when he was 2 years old. He later attended University College Dublin.

== Family ==
Barrington married Eileen O'Donovan, daughter of Irish senator Seán O'Donovan and Kathleen Boland, sister of Gerald Boland and Harry Boland. They had four children, Kathleen, Kevin, Eileen and Brian.
