= St Joseph's Industrial School, Dundalk =

School in Ireland

St Joseph's Industrial School, Dundalk was an industrial school in Dundalk, County Louth, Ireland.

It started as a school founded in 1847 during the Great Famine at the instigation of the parish priest and local residents. Five members of the Sisters of Mercy order arrived from Dublin to start the school, which was based in Seatown Place.

It was first certified as an industrial school in 1881. It was a girls school until boys were first admitted in 1965, though formal admission was first given in 1971.

It closed in 1983.
