= Founded on Fear =

2006 autobiography by Peter Tyrrell

- Cover of the 2006 edition
- Editor: Diarmuid Whelan
- Author: Peter Tyrrell
- Language: English
- Genre: Autobiography
- Publisher: Irish Academic Press
- Publication date: 2006
- Publication place: Ireland
- ISBN: 9780716534020

Founded on Fear: Letterfrack Industrial School, war and exile (concisely known as Founded on Fear) is an autobiography, written by Irish activist Peter Tyrrell in 1959 and published posthumously in 2006 by the Irish Academic Press, in which Tyrrell recounts his childhood in St Joseph's Industrial School in Letterfrack, Ireland, where he was incarcerated, due to his family's poverty, between 1924 and 1932. He suffered physical, emotional and sexual abuse by the Christian Brothers who staffed the school. Later in the book, he describes his military career, his stint in the Nazi prisoner-of-war camp Stalag XI-B (which he compares favourably to Letterfrack) and his life after World War II.

Tyrrell had started writing the book in 1958, at the encouragement of Senator Owen Sheehy-Skeffington, and completed it in 1959; however, it was not published until 2005, when historian Diarmuid Whelan discovered Tyrrell's manuscript in Sheehy-Skeffington's papers.

== Background ==
Peter Tyrrell was born in 1916 to poor parents near Ballinasloe. In 1924, the authorities, alerted to the impoverished conditions in which the Tyrrells lived, removed Peter and his older brothers from the home and placed them in St Joseph's Industrial School in Letterfrack, Ireland. While at Letterfrack, Tyrrell and his peers were physically and sexually abused by certain members of the Christian Brothers who staffed the school.

After he was released from Letterfrack, Tyrrell became a tailor, moved to England and enlisted in the British Army, where he served in the King's Own Scottish Borderers regiment from 1935 to 1945. Throughout the 1950s he wrote letters to government officials and members of the Congregation of Christian Brothers in an attempt to force them to address the issue of institutional child abuse, but his correspondence went without reply. In 1967, Tyrrell committed suicide by setting himself alight on Hampstead Heath in London.

== Summary ==
Founded on Fear, as published, begins with the introduction by Diarmuid Whelan, in which he summarised Tyrrell's life and provided additional information from Tyrrell's notes and letters to Sheehy-Skeffington. A subsequent "Note on the Text", also by Whelan, lists the corrections and revisions Whelan made to Tyrrell's manuscript; he fixed Tyrrell's idiosyncratic punctuation and capitalisation but kept the "grammatical infelicities" and misspellings (except those that rendered the word unintelligible) in order to "allow the reader to hear his voice". After that is a foreword by Tyrrell in which Tyrrell explained his reasons for writing the memoir and the previous failure of his campaign to expose child abuse in industrial schools. The Transworld Ireland edition of Founded on Fear contains 352 pages, and there is an alphabetically ordered index in the back matter. Founded on Fear's main text contains fifteen chapters.

In the first chapter, titled "Background", Tyrrell describes his childhood before, and the events leading to, his incarceration in Letterfrack. The Tyrrells, at that time, lived in a two-room house with holes in the roof, no windows and a cobblestone floor. His father James, whom Peter describes as a "lazy and irresponsible husband and father"), neglected to do any renovations or repairs on the house. Peter and his siblings would forage in the woods for fruit and nuts and steal crops from their neighbours' fields, and their mother would beg their neighbours for money. When Peter was about six, his eldest brother Mick obtained a job as a butcher; his wage allowed Peter and his siblings to attend school in Ahascragh. However, James Tyrrell lost his job and it became clear that the children, whose clothes had worn out, would not be able to go to school for much longer; new clothing from the United States was ordered but did not arrive for several months. After giving birth to another child in 1923, Peter's mother contracted rheumatoid arthritis and became disabled. A social worker visited the Tyrrells' house in late 1923; in January of 1924, the authorities returned to take Peter and his older brothers Joe, Paddy and Jack to St. Joseph's Industrial School in Letterfrack.

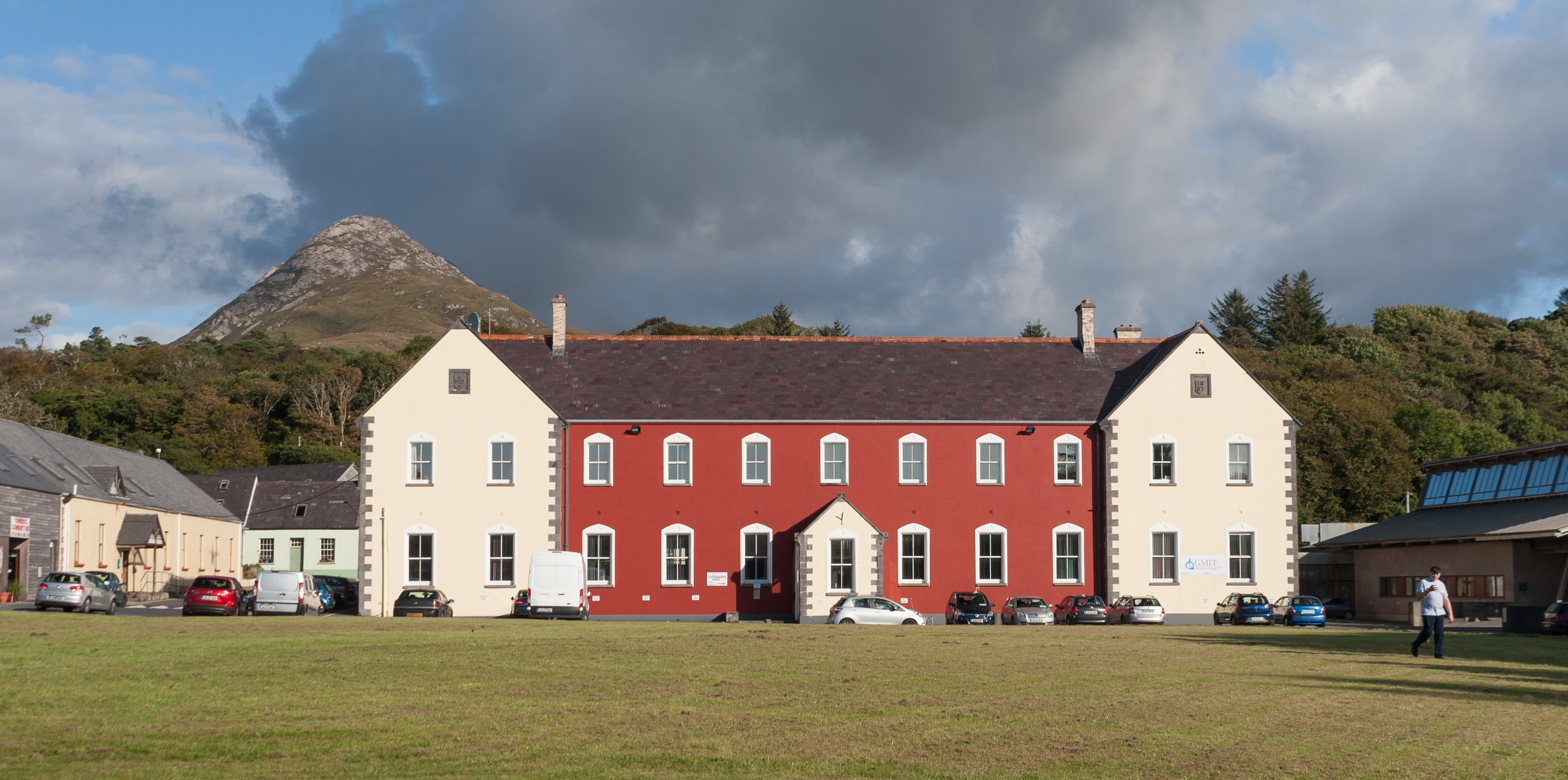
The former St Joseph's Industrial School, where Tyrrell and his older brothers were sent

Chapters 2 through 10 recount his life at Letterfrack, which he entered at eight and left at sixteen. Several of the Christian Brothers who ran the school beat Peter and the other boys daily, often for minor infractions (such as waking too early in the morning) or for no reason at all. Whelan claims in his introduction that one brother in particular, Brother Vale, made Tyrrell's experience at Letterfrack "an eight-year nightmare". At one point, Peter spent two weeks in the infirmary after his arm was broken during a beating. The only times when beatings did not occur at all were on holidays, during which even the normally abusive Brothers fed the boys generously, gave them gifts and spent quality time with them; Tyrrell claims that during Christmas he "never heard an unkind word". Some of the Brothers sexually groomed the boys and took them into their bedrooms to molest them. Not all the faculty were cruel; for example, Brother Kelly, the superior of Letterfrack, never abused any of the children, and Tyrrell, who calls him a "saint", believed he was unaware that the other Brothers were abusive. Tyrrell describes Mr Griffin, supposedly "one of the best teachers in the country", as similarly kind. Because of the medical neglect and poor living conditions, head lice, chilblains, periodontal disease and malnutrition were commonplace. The boys were forced to create goods for the Brothers and to fund the school; Peter was among those assigned to the tailor's shop, where he learned how to tailor. Older boys whom the Brothers put in charge as "monitors" during mealtimes were often bullies toward the younger boys.

Chapters 11 and 12 recount his departure from Letterfrack in 1932, and his life for three years thereafter. Immediately after his return home, Peter obtained a job as a tailor for a tradesman named Mr Evans; but had difficulty reintegrating himself into Irish society, as tailors and former industrial school inmates were both seen as inferior. For instance, a girl in whom Peter was interested remarked that Peter was "one of them", and showed discomfort around him, after he confirmed to her that he had been in Letterfrack. The Tyrrells moved into a new house, built by Mick and funded by a government grant. Though Peter enjoyed hunting rabbits and ducks with Mick, he was generally "unhappy and discontented"; he startled easily and suffered frequent "attacks of trembling" and illnesses. He took long walks to avoid visitors his family had over, because they "[got] on [his] nerves", and he would cycle the long way home so as to not be seen by his neighbours.

Chapters 13 and 14 recount, respectively, his military service and his stint as a prisoner of war. After moving to England in June of 1935, he enlisted in King's Own Scottish Borderers regiment of the British Army. He was stationed in India for most of his service, but also served in Malta and Palestine. He met a woman named Angela Dennison in India in 1942, and had a romantic relationship with her; because he felt he was "not good enough for her", however, he left her. After his battalion was moved to Geilenkerchen in December of 1944, Tyrrell was wounded, captured by the Germans and taken to the prisoner-of-war camp Stalag XI-B near Fallingbostel. He compares his experience at the camp, where he and other Western prisoners were treated humanely whereas Soviet prisoners were starved, favourably to his childhood in Letterfrack. He felt that there was civility between the Germans and the Western prisoners in the camp, and he attributed the meagre food to wartime scarcity, for which he did not fault Germany. Stalag XI-B was liberated in April of 1945, whereupon he returned to England; Tyrrell was demobilised in December of that year and discharged in June of 1946.

Chapter 15 describes his life after the end of World War II. Tyrrell recounts having gained confidence and recovered from much of his trauma during his military service. He obtained a job inspecting government uniforms for the Ministry of Supply. After he was laid off in 1947, he took an excursion to Ireland; he questioned whether to move back, but decided not to. Back in England, he encountered Tom Thornton, an old friend from Letterfrack, outside a pub; the next day, Thornton told him news about the deaths of several of the faculty and students of Letterfrack. Tyrrell moved into a boarding house in Camden Town. He learnt through a postcard from his brother that their mother had died, but he was not saddened; she had been suffering poor health for years. Tyrrell condemns Irish society for abusing its children in industrial schools, causing damage that his "vocabulary is too limited to explain". He argues that the Irish have given the English the impression that they are drunken, unintelligent and a nuisance because the abuse and poor education of industrial schools have damaged many of them; and that Catholicism has made Irish people the "most unhappy and the most backward race in Europe". He concludes that the Irish must establish a "new religion founded on love, friendship and understanding", and "want home rule, NOT ROME RULE".

== Composition and publication ==
In 1958, Tyrrell contacted Irish senator Owen Sheehy-Skeffington at the behest of the London Irish Centre; when they met in Dublin, Sheehy-Skeffington advised Tyrrell to write an account of his experiences at St. Joseph's Industrial School. Tyrrell began in August of 1958 to draft the memoir on weekends, and on evenings after returning home from work. He wrote as his thoughts flowed and made few revisions. Each chapter, once completed, would be posted, with an accompanying letter, to Sheehy-Skeffington. The process of writing caused Tyrrell to become lonesome and depressed, and his family and friends advised him to stop for the sake of his mental health, but his compulsion to effect change in the industrial school system motivated him to continue; he finished writing the book in February of 1959. The completed manuscript was approximately 70,000 words long, or 300 pages. Tyrrell informed Sheehy-Skeffington that, while everything he did write into the book was factual, there were many incidents from Letterfrack that he found so upsetting to relive he omitted them.

Founded on Fear was not published in either Tyrrell's or Sheehy-Skeffington's lifetimes, because the public did not want to confront the abuses that were ongoing in industrial schools. In 2005, 38 years after Tyrrell's death, Irish historian Diarmuid Whelan, while archiving Owen Sheehy-Skeffington's papers, came across the manuscript of Tyrrell's autobiography. He edited it to fix Tyrrell's idiosyncratic grammar (Tyrrell started random words with capital letters and used commas incorrectly), wrote an introduction to it and had the book published as Founded on Fear: Letterfrack Industrial School, war and exile by the Irish Academic Press in 2006. The book was republished by Transworld Ireland in 2008.

== Reception ==
Founded on Fear received positive reviews from several authors and critics. In a review for The Irish Times, Mary Raftery, who produced a documentary series titled States of Fear about abuse in industrial schools, compared Tyrrell to Primo Levi, a Holocaust survivor whose memoir (If This Is a Man) of the Auschwitz concentration camp was repeatedly refused for publication. She called Tyrrell a "rare phenomenon of post-Independence Ireland ... a genuine hero" and Founded on Fear a "document of enormous historical significance". Daire Keogh, also for The Irish Times, wrote that it was a pity that Founded on Fear had not been published during Tyrrell's lifetime. Irish author Sebastian Barry read Founded on Fear as part of his research of industrial school abuse for his novel Old God's Time.

The Congregation of Christian Brothers praised Founded on Fear and apologised for both the abuse their congregation had inflicted upon boys in industrial schools and their dismissal of Tyrrell's complaints in the 1950s.

== Works cited ==
Tyrrell, Peter (2008). Whelan, Diarmuid (ed.). Founded on Fear: Letterfrack Industrial School, war and exile. Dublin : Transworld Ireland. ISBN 978-1-84827-023-7.
