= All-Ireland Final =

The All-Ireland Final may refer to:

- All-Ireland Hurling Final, the last match to be played in the All-Ireland Hurling Championship (Senior, Minor and Under-21 levels)
- The last match to be played in the All-Ireland Senior Football Championship
- The last match to be played in the All-Ireland Minor Football Championship
- The last match to be played in the All-Ireland Under-21 Football Championship
- The last match to be played in the All-Ireland Senior Ladies' Football Championship
- The last match to be played in the All-Ireland Junior Ladies' Football Championship
- The last match to be played in the All-Ireland Senior Camogie Championship

== See also ==
- List of All-Ireland Fleadh champions
