= Artane Industrial School =

Former reform school in northern Dublin suburb of Artane

St. Josephs Industrial School, Artane
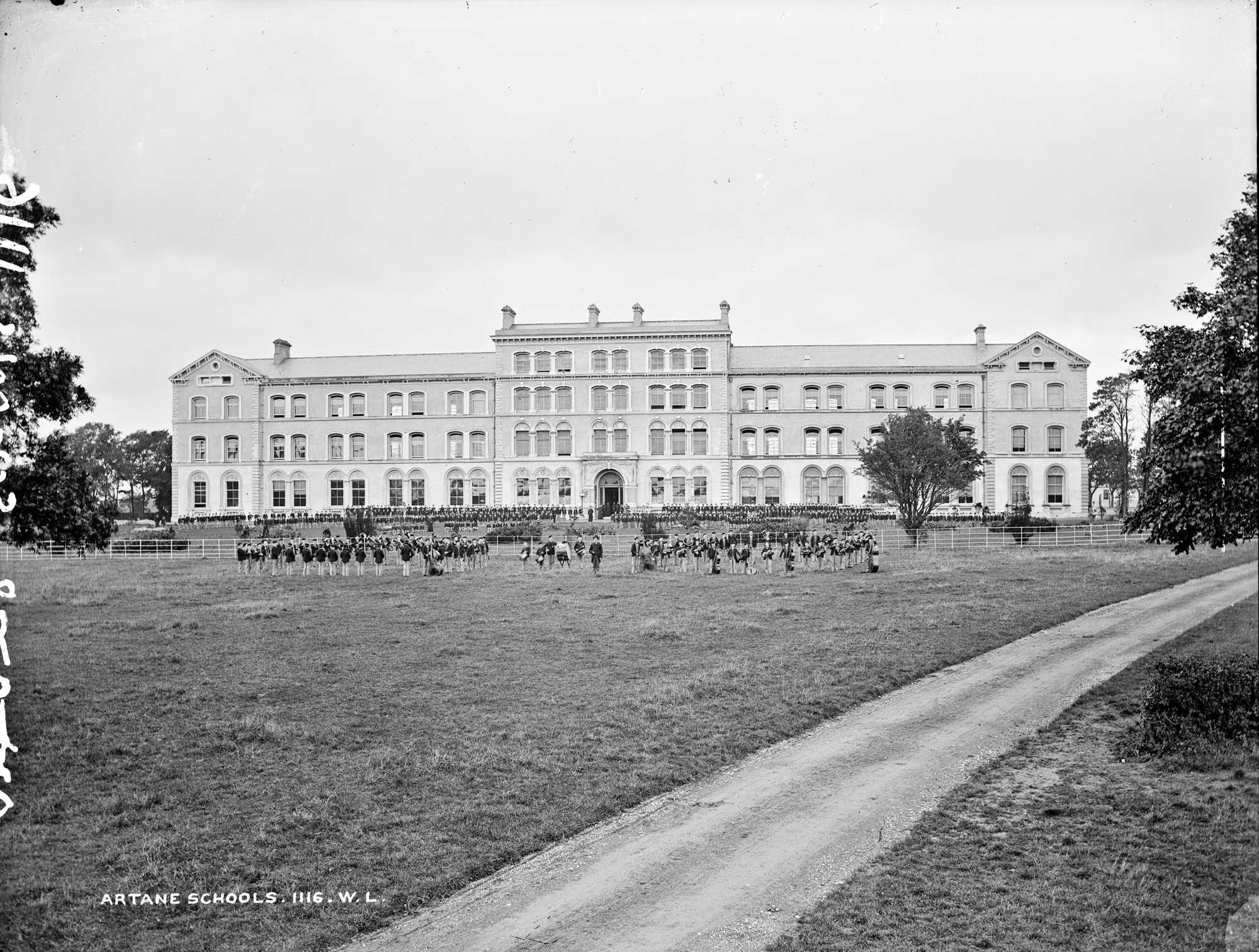
- Ireland

Information
- Type: Industrial

St. Josephs Industrial School, Artane was an Industrial School run by the Christian Brothers in Artane, Dublin from 1870 to 1969.

== History ==
On 28 July 1870, the Artane Industrial School for Roman Catholic Boys, also known as St Joseph's, was officially certified to receive boys up to the age of 14 committed by magistrates for matters such as destitution, neglect, truancy and minor offences. The school was opened at the former site of Artane Castle on 56 acres of land. Dormitories accommodated up to 150 boys. The dining area or refectory accommodated all 825 boys at one sitting. The facility comprised the School, the trade shops and the farm, in addition to the Community house.

The school was set up in Artane House and buildings were constructed to designs by Charles Geoghan from 1871 to 1879 at a cost of £20,000.

Artane reached its peak enrollment of 830 in 1948, when numbers began to decline. Courts sent boys to Artane for reasons of inadequate parental care, destitution, neglect, truancy or the commission of minor offences. Adoption, fostering and boarding-out led to a decline in the number of children who would otherwise have entered the industrial schools. Artane was the largest industrial school, making it the most affected by these developments.

=== Cussen Commission ===
In 1936 the Cussen Commission inquiry into reformatories and industrial schools concluded that the school was too large and recommended that it be split into four schools. There is no indication of any follow-up on this recommendation by either the Christian Brothers or the Department of Education. The commission was also critical of the level of education provided and the adequacy of aftercare for boys after they left school.

=== Fr. Henry Moore report ===
In 1962 a private report on the conditions in Artane was written by prison chaplain Father Henry Moore for Archbishop John Charles McQuaid. Father Moore focused on the management of the school, finding it deficient in many ways. He had read the Report of the Commission of Inquiry into the Industrial School system of 1936 and the Report into Youth Unemployment of 1951.

He addressed a popular misconception that the boys in Artane were of a criminal background: "By agreement with the Department of Justice the authorities at Artane will not accept committals with a criminal charge. This means that the inmates are either school non-attendance cases – about one-third of the total – the majority being orphans or children in special circumstances.".

He described the fabric of the school as being "in dilapidated condition, colourless and uninspiring, and reflects the interior spirit". There were around 450 boys at the school at the time.

He found medical facilities seriously lacking: "I fail to understand the indifference of Departmental Inspectors to the seriously inadequate medical facilities in the school. Apart from the twice-weekly visit of the Doctor there is no matron or nurse in attendance. A Brother without qualifications and who was transferred from the care of the poultry farm is now in charge of all medical requirements.". He also wrote: "Many boys, even the older ones, suffer from enuresis and nothing is done to remedy their condition.".

On the diet of the boys he wrote: "The boys are reasonably well fed. There is fair variety but obvious essential requirements such as butter and fruit are never used. Milk puddings are served but these are of poor quality and without relish. In general I feel that the boys are undernourished and lacking calcium and other components.".

On clothing he wrote: "It seems to me that this aspect of the general care is grossly neglected. The boys' clothing is uncomfortable, unhygienic, and of a displeasing sameness. They are constantly dirty, both themselves and their clothes. The quality of the material is poor due to the fact that it manufactured on the premises. Overcoats are not supplied except where a boy can pay £3 to £4 in advance, which must come from his own pocket.". Clothes were treated as shared property: "A boy's personal clothing is as much the property of his neighbour. Shirts, underwear (vests are not worn), stockings, footwear, nightshirts (no pyjamas) are all common property and are handed down from generations. When these articles are laundered they are distributed at random, sometimes without regard to size."

On the primary school level of education at Artane he wrote: "It is difficult to assess with satisfaction the extent of the problems attending the education, literary and technical of the boys. To my mind the standard is extremely low.". He also wrote: "Last year a friend of mine took 22 boys on a camping holiday. He informed me that that although their ages ranged from 10 to 14 years, only 7 could write, and these had to be assisted. There seems to be an urgent need for some psychological assessment of the boys before grading them in classes. I believe that some of these boys are mentally handicapped and require psychiatric treatment.". He also wrote: "Unfortunately the Brothers are obliged to grade these boys as best they can. This is an undue hardship on teacher and pupil. I strongly recommend that the services of a competent psychiatrist should be sought.".

On the technical school level of education at Artane he wrote: "It is, perhaps, in this department that the most glaring defect is noticed. At 14 the boy is admitted to the Trade shop. This year there are 150 boys in that department, but of these only 12 were eligible for the Vocational School examination. Last year, out of 18 who sat for the examination only 5 were successful. In view of the requirements of Technical education, the situation in Artane is obsolete. There seems to be no effort to train the boys satisfactorily at their trades. They might be described as juvenile labourer, uneducated and unskilled. This is evident from the variety of tasks to be done by individual boys. Vocational guidance is unknown. Boys are allotted to various trades without reference to their suitability or preference. This unhappy position inevitably engenders frustration.". On the employment of former pupils he wrote: "In the past two years 140 boys or so were discharged. Approximately 75% of these were placed at employment for which they were never trained. The purpose of the school is therefore defeated.". Of teachers he wrote: "The lay instructors are all of long standing in the school – some with service varying from 29 to 30 years. They are not acquainted with modern teaching methods and practice. Little encouragement is given them towards fostering an enthusiastic and progressive attitude towards the boys. Many of them that are competent are underpaid and unappreciated.".

=== Closure ===
The Brothers had originally planned to close St. Joseph's on 31 August 1968, but action was deferred twice in order to give the Department of Education time to arrange alternative accommodation for the boys. The Institution closed on 30 June 1969. The main building is now used by St. David's College, while the School's refectory houses the Artane band.

== Band ==
The school formed the Artane Boys Band in 1872, which first played in public in 1874. It became associated with the Gaelic Athletic Association and played before big matches in Croke Park. After the industrial school's closure the band continued under a community-run Artane School of Music. In 2004, after girls were admitted, the band's name was changed to the "Artane Band".

Of the band, Father Moore wrote "In my opinion the band is the only worthwhile achievement of the school. About 80 boys are involved, but this number is only a fraction of the total. The time used, the money spent, the number of engagements annually met are, I fear, out of all proportion to the results obtained. The maintenance of the band, although approximating £2,000 annually, is a continual strain on financial resources."

Father Moore was concerned that band practice conflicted with classtime for other subjects: "Further, a serious gap in the boys' education follows from prolonged hours of practice and days missed from school.".

He was also concerned that few former band members pursued a career in music: "There is no evidence that even a small number continue their musical career on leaving the school. Instruments are costly and encouragement is lacking. Indeed, the Brother in charge could be most helpful in placing the boys in suitable positions.".

== Child abuse ==
The Commission to Inquire into Child Abuse found that Artane was under-staffed by a small number of largely inexperienced and untrained Brothers. As a result of complaints, the Commission to Inquire into Child Abuse investigated allegations of physical abuse, child sexual abuse, and neglect at Artane. The school "used frequent and severe corporal punishment", which was "systemic and pervasive", and that even when a child behaved it was still possible for him to be beaten. Sexual abuse of children by members of the Christian Brothers was "a chronic problem", that was at least one Brother during a 33-year period was a sexual abuser, that there were at least two such abusers for more than one third of those years and that for one year in the 1940s there were at least seven such abusers. Abuse by Christian Brothers was treated as a threat to the reputation of the order, thus protecting abusers. The most common reaction to abuse being reported was to move the offender to another institution run by the same order. Frequently abuse was not investigated nor was it reported to the Garda Síochána nor to the Department of Education. Exploitation of smaller pupils at the school by older ones was also significant. Mealtimes were poorly supervised, leading to smaller pupils being bullied and the facilities for serving food were primitive. Clothing was poor quality, institutional and patched, despite criticism by the Departmental Inspector and there being a surplus in school accounts. Toilet facilities were primitive before 1953 and accommodation was poor.

== Notable alumni ==
- Brian Behan - writer

== Sources ==
- "Chapter 7 St Joseph's Industrial School, Artane ('Artane'), 1870–1969". Report of the Commission to Inquire into Child Abuse (PDF). Government of Ireland. 20 May 2009.

== See also ==
- Industrial school
- St Joseph's Industrial School, Ferryhouse Clonmel, Co. Tipperary.
- St Joseph's Industrial School, Letterfrack, Co. Galway.
- Magdalen Asylum
