= Letterfrack =

Village in County Galway, Ireland

Letterfrack Irish: Leitir Fraic
- Village
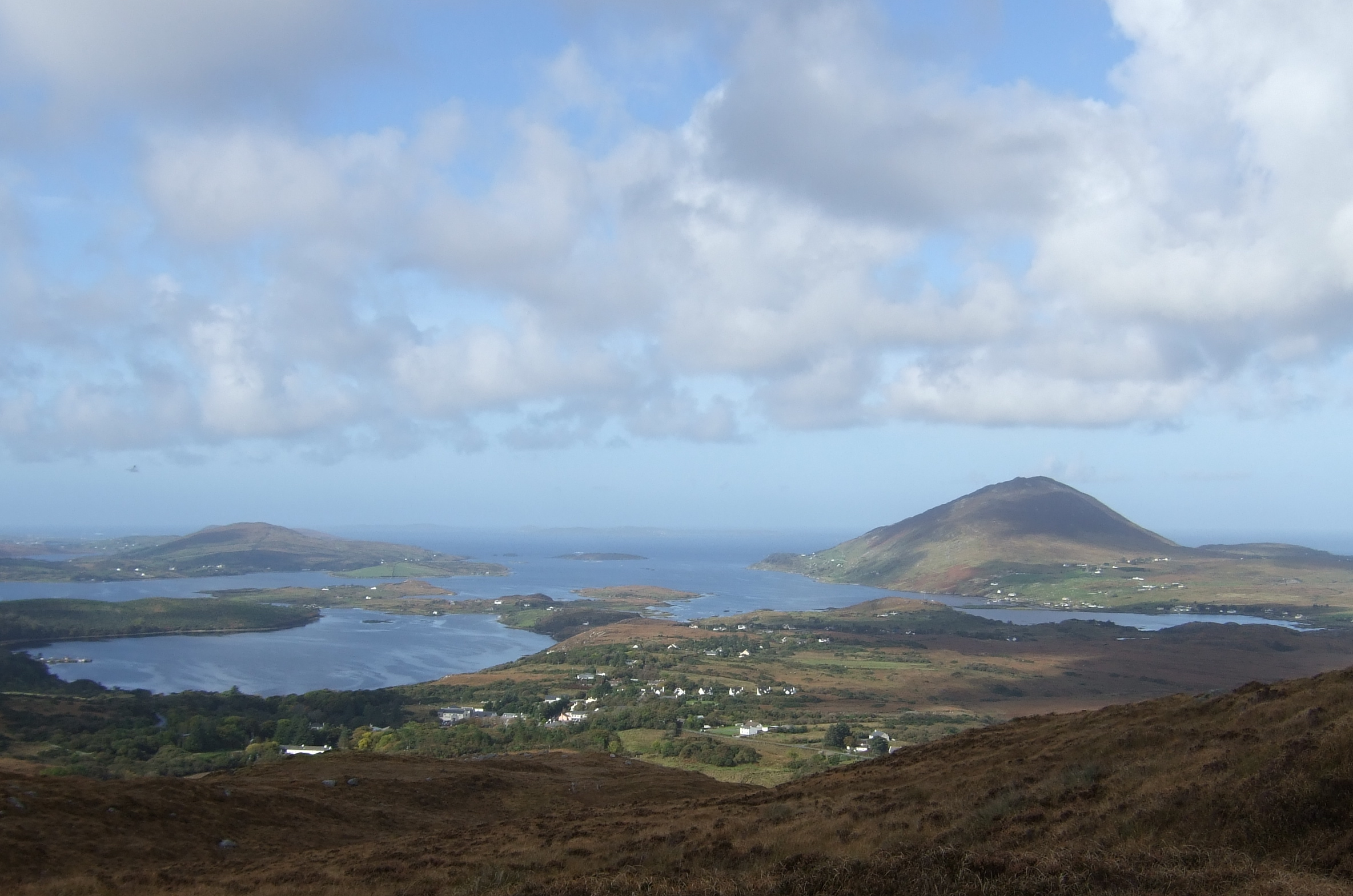
- View of Letterfrack and Ballinakill harbour, 2008

- Location in Ireland
- Coordinates: 53.55°N 9.95°W
- Country: Ireland
- Province: Connacht
- County: County Galway
- Irish Grid Reference: L697591

Letterfrack or Letterfrac (Irish: Leitir Fraic or Leiter Bhreac, meaning 'speckled hill-side or sloping field') is a small village in the Connemara area of County Galway, Ireland. It was founded by Quakers in the mid-19th century. The village is south-east of Renvyle peninsula and 15 kilometres (9 miles) north-east of Clifden on Barnaderg Bay and lies at the head of Ballinakill harbour. Letterfrack contains the visitors centre for Connemara National Park.

== History ==
James and Mary Ellis, a Quaker couple from Bradford in England, moved to Letterfrack, during the Great Famine. Ellis became the resident landlord in Letterfrack in 1849. As Quakers, the Ellises wanted to help with the post-famine relief effort. They leased nearly 1,000 acres (405 ha) of rough land and set about farming it and planting it with woodland. They built a schoolhouse, housing for tradesmen, a shop, a dispensary, and a temperance hotel. In 1857 the property was sold to John Hall, a staunch Protestant, and supporter of the Irish Church Mission to Roman Catholics. The ICM used the building with the aim of converting Catholics to Protestantism. After 25 years without much success, Hall sold it in 1882 to the Catholic Archbishop of Tuam, John McEvilly, who used a false name to give Hall the impression that the buyer was a Protestant, for £3000 for 1,000 acres (405 ha). In 1885, he established St Joseph's Industrial School, Letterfrack which opened in 1887. Like many other institutions run by the Christian Brothers, Letterfrack Industrial School has since become notorious for excessive use of corporal punishment, neglect, and child molestation of the boys in its charge, and was closed down in 1974.

== Marconi wireless station ==
Marconi selected St. Joseph's Industrial School in Letterfrack as the location for the transatlantic wireless receiver station for his new duplex transatlantic wireless service. It is one of the earliest Marconi stations still standing in the world. The duplex operation was initially developed by Marconi's engineers at Letterfrack using a balanced Carborundum detector connected to a drop wire from an aerial suspended between Diamond Hill and Mweelin. Duplex communication soon became standard practice for commercial and military radiotelegraphy communication worldwide.

Beginning in April 1911, eastbound messages were sent from Marconi Towers, a high power wireless station in Nova Scotia, to Letterfrack; while westbound messages were sent simultaneously from the Clifden high power wireless station to Louisbourg in 1913. The Letterfrack station was moved to Currywongaun and closed in April 1917. Some experimental work on shortwave and other work, by Marconi engineers Franklin and Witt, was carried out into the early 1920s.

== St. Joseph's church ==
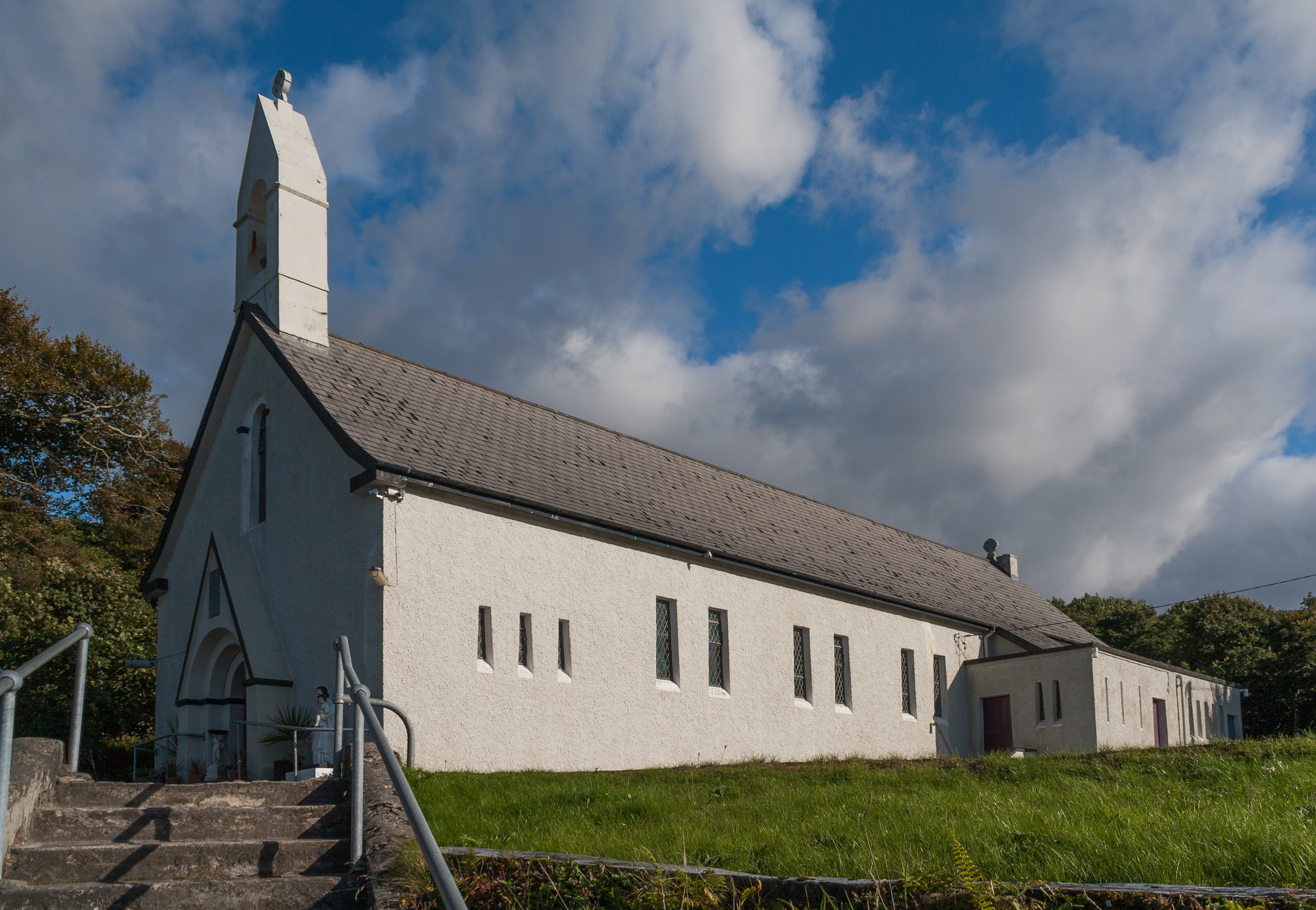
St. Joseph's church

In 1924–26 a church was built on the ground of the Industrial School after the designs of the architect Rudolf Maximilian Butler in a Romanesque Revival style. The church was dedicated to Saint Joseph by Thomas Gilmartin on 12 June 1926. The church consists of a single four-bay nave aligned north–south with two small side chapels and an attached sacristy on its western side.

== Atlantic TU (GMIT) campus ==
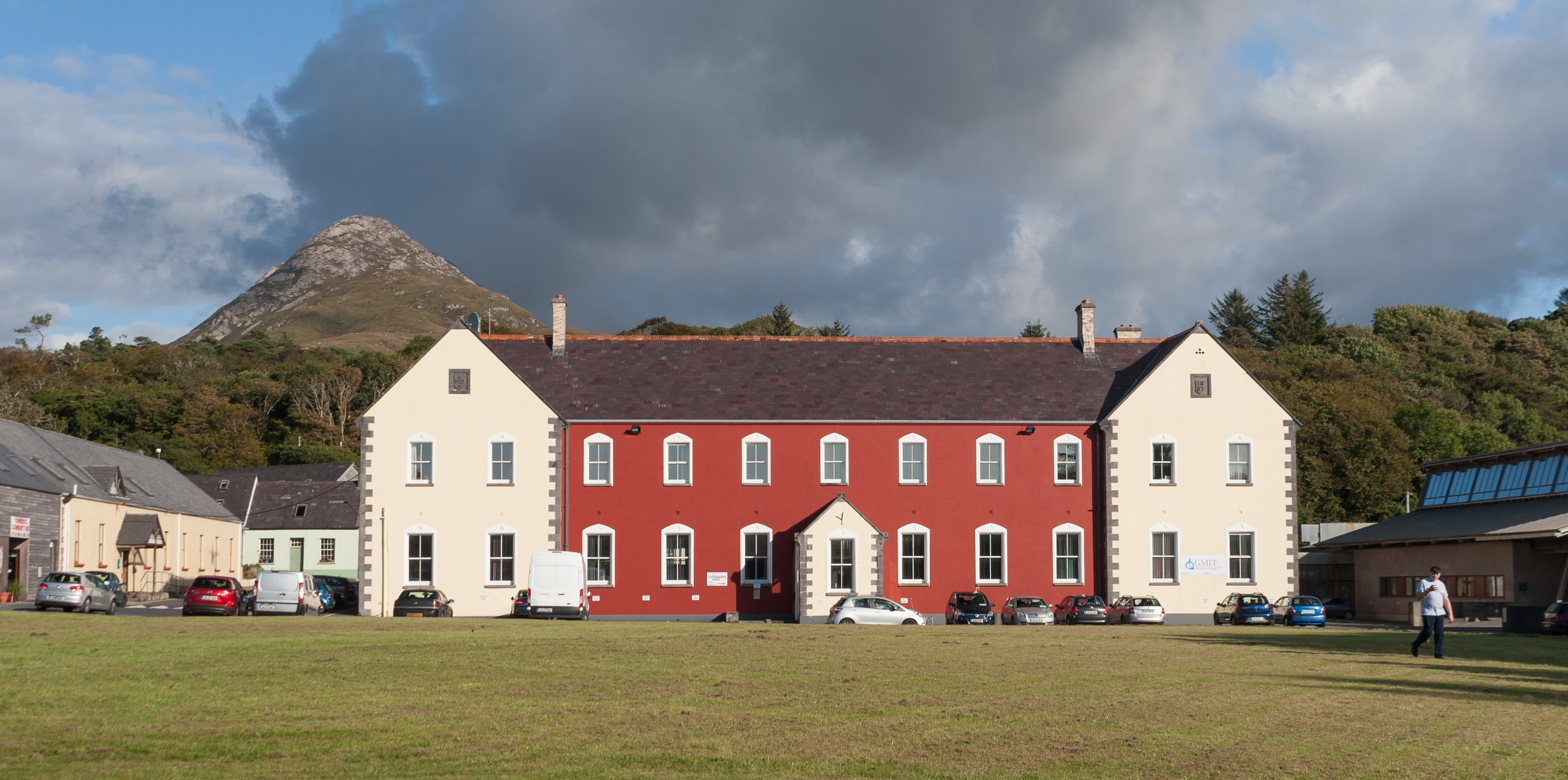
Atlantic TU Campus building in Letterfrack, originally built as St Joseph's Industrial School in 1887 after the designs of the Cavan architect William Hague.

In 1987 the Connemara West began running furniture courses which has become the Furniture College/Campus for the Atlantic Technological University.

== Sport ==
West Coast United F.C., the local association football team, was founded in 1984. As of 2021, the club had approximately 250 members across their senior team, over 40s team and the West Coast Utd Academy (launched in 2013) for boys and girls aged 5 to 11. The club won the Second Division Cup in 1994 and 1996/97, and the Jack Lillis Cup in 2010/11. The club's facility in Letterfrack has a sand-based playing pitch, a floodlit all-weather training pitch, and a clubhouse with changing rooms, meeting room and gymnasium.

== Media ==
Connemara Community Radio broadcasts from Letterfrack.

== See also ==
- List of towns and villages in Ireland
