= St Joseph's Industrial School, Letterfrack =

St Joseph's Industrial School
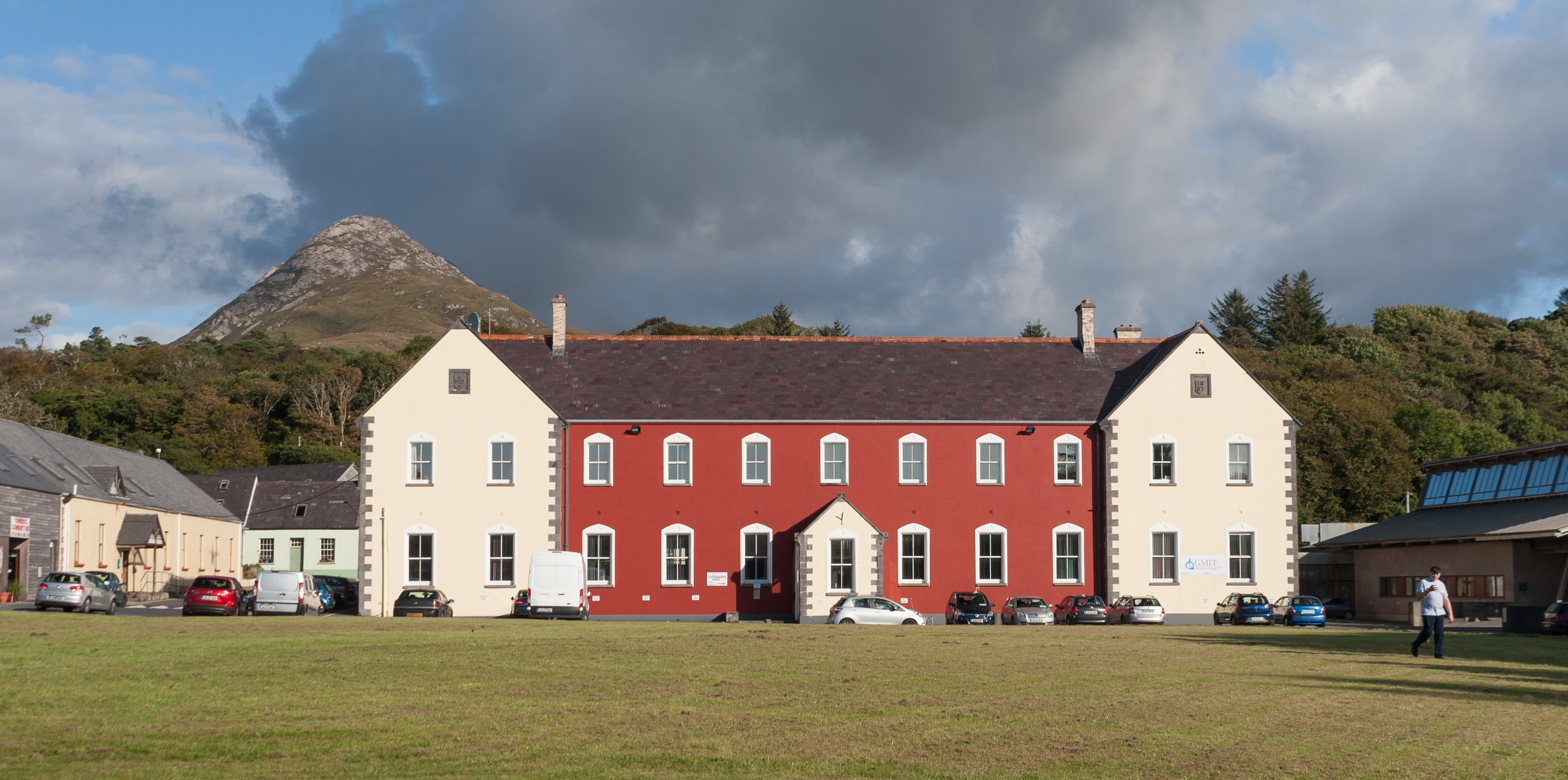
- Letterfrack, Connemara, County Galway; Ireland

Information
- Type: Industrial school
- Opened: 12 October 1887
- Founder: Congregation of Christian Brothers
- Closed: 1974; 52 years ago

St Joseph's Industrial School was an industrial school for boys in Letterfrack, County Galway, Ireland. The school was built in 1886/7 after the designs of the architect William Hague, opened in 1887, and run by the Congregation of Christian Brothers.

St Joseph's received a lasting notoriety through revelation of physical and sexual abuse of the boys by the Brothers there, with evidence of sexual abuse and extreme physical punishments going back to the 1930s. According to the Commission to Inquire into Child Abuse, between the years 1940 and 1970 fifteen children died there while in the care of the Christian Brothers, from various causes, including tuberculosis. Brother David Gibson, Provincial of the Irish Christian Brothers' northern province, which includes Letterfrack, said that following a more thorough investigation of their files it was now established that 100 boys had died at the school during the 86-year period.

The school was closed in 1974. In total 2,819 boys went through Letterfrack between 1887 and 1974.

== History ==
The plot of land that would go on to contain Letterfrack was purchased in 1849 by a wealthy Quaker couple, James and Mary Ellis, who built on it a school for local children, as well as a residence. After the Ellises left, the school was run by Protestant Irish Church Missions to Roman Catholics. The ICM's continued up until 1882. The Catholic Archbishop of Tuam, Dr John McEvilly bought the property in 1884. The Archbishop wrote to the Lord Lieutenant of Ireland, Earl Spencer suggesting that the property was "admirably suited for a boys' industrial school so sadly needed in that district". However, the Lord Lieutenants' advisors were against the establishment of the school on the grounds that there was unlikely to be enough children requiring such an institution in the area, and that the existing schools were adequate for the educational needs of the area. Sir Arthur Lentaigne, the Insepector of Industrial schools, backed the proposal, but the application was nonetheless refused.

The Lord Lieutenant came to support the endeavour in August 1885, after lobbying from the Archbishop. The school was initially certified for 75 boys and the Archbishop entered into negotiations with the Christian Brothers. The Christian Brothers agreed and after building work added to the property, the schools opened on 12 October 1887.

A revised certificate doubling the number of boys the school could care for was issued in April 1889, and in November 1912 the accommodation limit was increased to 190. There were three classes of boy committed to Letterfrack; first, those who were homeless, without proper guardianship, destitute, in breach of the School Attendance Act, or guilty of criminal offences; secondly, those sent by the Local Authorities pursuant to the Public Assistance Act 1939; and lastly, those whose parents or guardians had willingly admitted them. In 1954 the Christian Brothers, whose finances had been declining because of the decreasing number of children in their care, closed Carriglea Park in Dún Laoghaire, and transferred the "juvenile delinquents" from that school over to Letterfrack.

Letterfrack closed in 1974; according to the Secretary of the Department of Education, the school's remoteness rendered finding employees difficult and was considered harmful for the pupils who had come from cities.

== Conclusions of the Ryan Report ==
=== Physical abuse ===
The report concluded that corporal punishment in Letterfrack was "severe, excessive and pervasive, and created a climate of fear", that it "was the primary method of control" and that punishment was unavoidable because "it was frequently capricious, unfair and inconsistent". The report also found that formal public punishments "left a deep and lasting impression on those present. Witnesses were still troubled by memories of seeing and hearing other boys being beaten", and that all rules regarding the use of corporal punishment had been disregarded; "the lack of supervision and control allowed Brothers to devise unusual punishments and there were sadistic elements to some of them."

There was no punishment book kept and the Department of Education was found to be at fault for not ensuring that one was maintained.

=== Sexual abuse ===
Sexual abuse "by Brothers was a chronic problem in Letterfrack" and that those members of the order who served there "included firstly those who had previously been guilty of sexual abuse of boys, secondly those whose abuse was discovered while they worked in that institution and, thirdly some who were subsequently revealed to have abused boys".

The Christian Brothers "did not properly investigate allegations of sexual abuse of boys by Brothers" and "knew that Brothers who sexually abused boys were a continuing danger". Sending known abusers to any industrial school was "an act of reckless disregard" especially "one as remote and isolated as Letterfrack". The handling of members of the order who committed abuse suggested "a policy of protecting the Brothers, the Community and the Congregation at the expense of the victims".

Abuse by peers was "an element of the bullying and intimidation that were prevalent in Letterfrack and the Brothers failed to recognise it as a persistent problem". Lack of understanding on behalf of the order of the nature of abuse committed by peers combined with fear of punishment meant that some victims didn't report such abuse at the time.

=== Neglect ===
Boys at Letterfrack "were unprotected in a hostile environment isolated from their families", they "left Letterfrack with little education and no adequate training". They needed extra support to bring them up to standard "but instead they got poor teachers and bad conditions".

Letterfrack was physically isolated and most boys were at a great distance from their families- the surrounding area did not supply the number of children required, and many were from as far as Dublin and Leinster. The isolation was also a factor in institutionalisation and helped abusers evade scrutiny. The remote location of the school was a factor in its closure.

== Former residents ==
- In a 2018 episode of the TV series Who Do You Think You Are, musician Damien Dempsey, learned that his grandfather, Thomas Dempsey, had been incarcerated at Letterfrack at the age of 12; he spent four years in the institution, which he later compared to Auschwitz.
- Mannix Flynn (b. 1957) — playwright, author, artist, and actor.
- Peter Tyrrell (1916–1967) — he told Owen Sheehy-Skeffington about the abuse perpetrated at Letterfrack and wrote about his experience there in his autobiography, published posthumously as Founded on Fear in 2006. Tyrrell committed suicide by setting fire to himself on Hampstead Heath in London.

== Works cited ==
- The Commission to Inquire into Child Abuse (2009). "8". Letterfrack Industrial School ('Letterfrack'), 1885-1974. The Commission to Inquire into Child Abuse Report (Report). Vol. 1.
