= Industrial school (Ireland) =

Former children's institutions

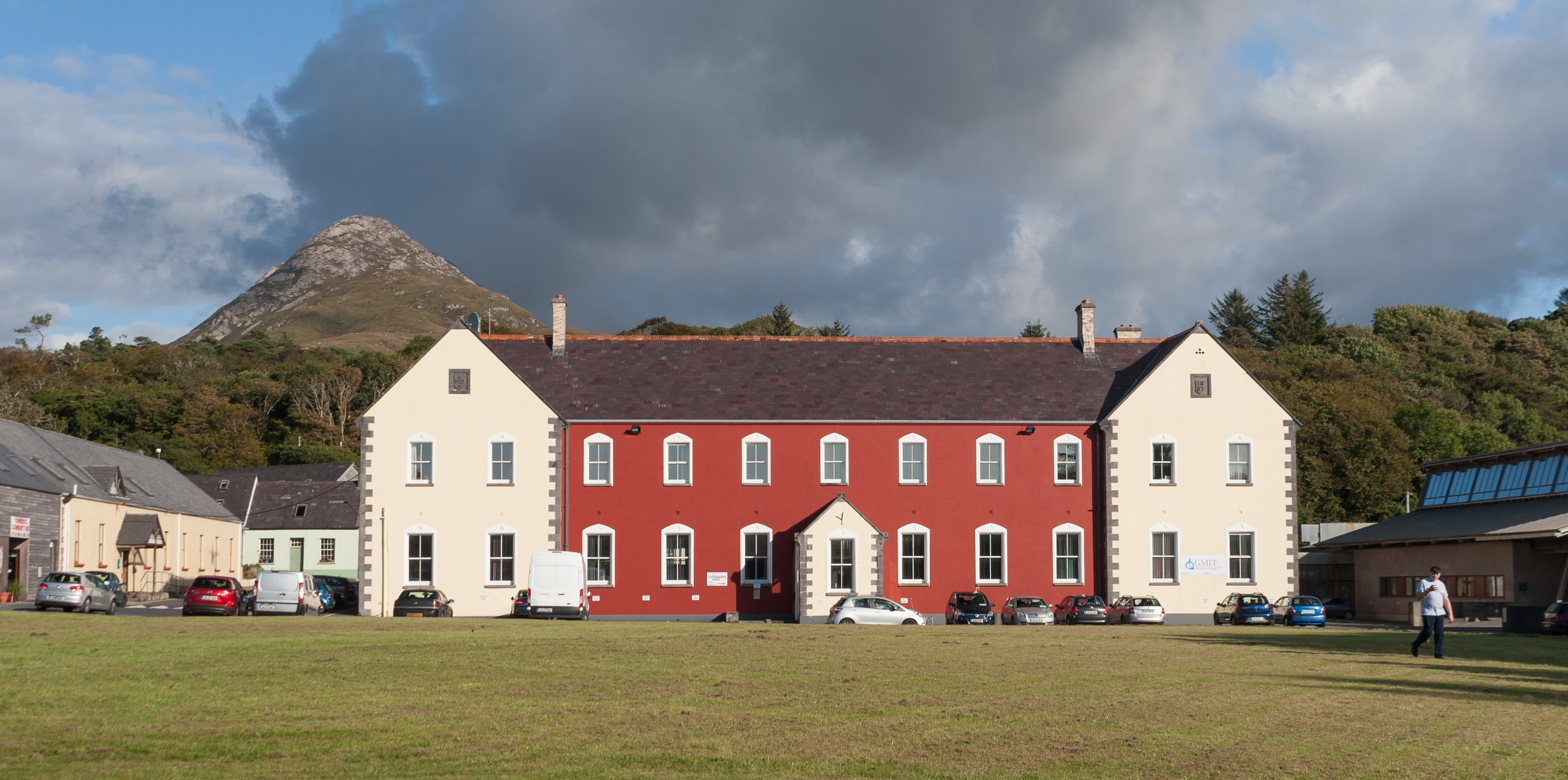
Former St Joseph's Industrial School in Letterfrack

Industrial schools (Irish: Scoileanna Saothair, IPA: [ˈsˠkɛlʲən̪ˠə ˈsˠiːhəɾʲ]) were operated in Ireland from 1868 to 1995 to care for orphans, neglected children, abandoned children, children convicted of criminal offences and children from impoverished families. Most were run by Catholic orders and funded by both the local government and the central Irish government. Physical, emotional and sexual abuse, and medical neglect, of residents by both religious and lay staff were widespread in industrial schools. The Commission to Inquire into Child Abuse was created in 2000 to investigate abuses in industrial schools; their report, which was published in 2009, is commonly known as the Ryan Report.

== Operations ==
Industrial schools were operated mostly by Catholic orders, but a few by Protestants. The Sisters of Mercy ran more industrial schools than did any other order, but many others were run by the Christian Brothers. All but twelve industrial schools were single-sex. Industrial schools for boys were classed into those for junior boys (younger than ten years of age) and senior boys (usually ten or older, but boys down to eight years of age were sometimes admitted). Some industrial schools for girls also admitted junior boys, and others became entirely co-educational in the 1970s. Religious sisters ran girls' and junior boys' schools, and priests and religious brothers ran senior boys'. Industrial schools were funded by the local government, which would give a religious order that ran an industrial school a "capitation grant" proportional to the number of children the school housed. The central Irish government began giving grants in 1939, ten shillings weekly for every child under six. To avert the controversy that would result from the government directing funds toward the religious orders, these grants were intended solely to fund the care of the children.

Children were sent to industrial schools due to being committed there by courts, surrendered by their parents, or transferred from foster care or from another institution (e.g. a Mother and Baby Home). A court could commit a child because he had been orphaned; because his parents could not take care of him, neglected him, did not want to care for him or were too poor to provide for his needs; because he had been born to an unmarried woman, but could not be adopted out; because he was homeless; because he had not attended school regularly; or because he had been convicted of a crime. All these reasons but the last two were categorised as a "lack of proper guardianship", for which 80% of children in industrial schools were committed. Though industrial schools were commonly called orphanages, it was reported in 1933 that only 5.3% of industrial school children were true orphans (i.e. both their parents were deceased).

By 1884, there were 5,049 children in industrial schools throughout the country. Industrial schools reached their highest number of 71, housing a total of 7998 children, in 1898. Of the 61 in what is now the Republic of Ireland, 56 schools were Catholic-run and five were Protestant-run.

== Life in industrial schools ==
Industrial school residents were given new clothing upon arrival; for boys these were, according to the Ryan Report, "knee-length tweed trousers and jacket, woollen jumper and knee socks, nightshirt and boots", whereas girls received second-hand clothing that had been donated. Until the 1970s, winter wear, e.g. coats and scarves, was not usually provided. Residents ate meals in communal refectories, slept in unpartitioned dormitories and attended their hygiene in communal facilities. Many schools enforced a code of silence during working hours and mealtimes. During their years at the industrial schools many residents never saw their parents, nor their siblings who had not been committed or had been committed to a different institution; however, some were allowed to visit home or have their parents visit them at the school. Residents spent much of their time working. Work for boys included tailoring, shoemaking, weaving, carpentry and farming; for girls, cleaning the school, laundering the staff's clothing, caring for infants that the school admitted, supervising and caring for the younger residents, domestic chores, making rosary beads, knitting and embroidering. Both also worked in the kitchen, preparing food and washing dishes; former residents recalled preferring this type of work, as it permitted them to sneak extra food. Residents had little-to-no say in what type of work they did. There were generally few outlets for entertainment and supplies for indoor recreation, but those recounted by former residents included board games and the radio. Boys boxed and played sports like handball, and girls used spare fabric to make dolls and small balls. Some faculty would take the children on outings, such as to the beach.

The nutrition and living conditions at industrial schools were poor. Because their meals were scanty, many of the children were underweight and failed to thrive; during holidays such as Christmas, or whenever an inspector or outside people visited a school, however, the children there would temporarily receive better food. Peter Tyrrell recounted in his memoir Founded on Fear that the supper at Letterfrack "consisted of a mug of cocoa (unsweetened) and a half slices of bread and margarine". In many industrial schools, the heating was broken or inadequate, so the children were constantly cold. Bedding was often filthy and, even for children who wet or soiled the bed, seldom changed. Hygienic supplies were scanty, but children were still beaten for being unclean or having head lice. Towels with which to dry off after bathing were often shared because there were not enough for every resident. Faculty would often refuse to seek medical treatment for residents unless, and sometimes even if, they were severely ill; and would also often refuse to follow medical advice for the residents' care. Several residents died or incurred permanent complications from this neglect. Most industrial schools had infirmaries, some of whose staff would beat the patients. Medical personnel, from outside the school, who treated the residents generally did not report nor inquire into injuries that had resulted from abuse.

Physical and emotional abuse of children, both boys and girls, by religious and lay faculty was pervasive in most industrial schools. Beatings occurred daily and at random; former residents recounted not knowing the next time they would be struck. The most common implement in industrial schools for boys was a leather strap; in industrial schools for girls, a wooden stick. Children were beaten and humiliated for being left-handed, wetting the bed, doing poorly academically, talking back, not completing domestic tasks to the faculty's liking, or for no reason at all. They would, alternatively, be doused with boiling water, forced to burn their hand on an electric socket, intimidated with dogs, forced to take extremely hot or cold baths or showers, forced to remain for long periods in the same position, locked in a confined space or forced to sleep all night outside. Sexual abuse was pervasive in boys' schools, but occurred only incidentally in girls' schools. Both male and female staff, but much more often male staff, would rape the children, molest them, force them to strip before beatings or force them to fondle them [the staff]. Most sexual abuse of boys was committed by male staff. Contrariwise, most sexual abuse of girls was committed by non-staff members, such as visitors to the school and people at a work or holiday placement to which a girl had been sent. Some older children would bully or sexually abuse the younger ones, particularly those whom they had been charged with caring for or supervising. The Irish communities saw industrial schools as "shameful places" because of their status as "juvenile prisons" and the shabby, neglected appearances of the children in them. Inmates were seen as belonging to an inferior social class; as a result many were, upon their discharge, ostracised and unable to reintegrate into Irish society, compelling them to emigrate from Ireland to the United Kingdom.

== History ==
The first industrial school in Ireland was set up by Lady Louisa Conolly in Celbridge, County Kildare, where young boys learnt woodwork and shoemaking skills as well as other trade skills. Day schools and orphanages were founded throughout Ireland in the 1850s and 1860s, because of people's increasing worries about the plight of vulnerable children. Hitherto, most orphaned, abandoned or destitute children resided in workhouses or on the streets, although so-called "Ragged Schools" (such as the one at the Coombe in Dublin) had been accommodating some of them for decades. The government-aided system of industrial schools was not introduced, however, until 1868 by the Industrial Schools (Ireland) Act 1868 (31 & 32 Vict. c. 25); an equivalent system had been established four years prior in England. Reformatory schools, which housed children found guilty of criminal offences, had been established ten years earlier, in 1858, under the Reformatory Schools (Ireland) Act. The 1868 Act ensured, to alleviate societal tensions between the Protestant and Catholic sectors of Ireland, that Protestant and Catholic children would be put in different schools to prevent proselytising.

By 1900, only seven of the ten original reformatories remained. In 1917 the last industrial school run by the Church of Ireland (Anglican) was closed in Stillorgan. A number of the reformatories were re-certified as industrial schools so that by 1922, only five remained (one of which was a reformatory for boys in Northern Ireland). Attempts in the 1950s and 1960s by activists such as Peter Tyrrell and Senator Owen Sheehy-Skeffington, who had encouraged Tyrrell to write Founded on Fear, to bring the abuses in industrial schools to the public eye and effect changes in how they were run were dismissed and ignored, because Irish society was "not ready" to acknowledge the issue of child abuse. In 1966 the think tank Tuairim published a pamphlet (Some of our children: a report on the residential care of the deprived child in Ireland) about living conditions in industrial, as well as other residential, schools; it did not bring immediate reforms to them, but parts of a "new Children's Act" it proposed were in 1991 made law. Food and living conditions improved, and recreational opportunities and amenities became more plentiful, in the 1970s and 1980s. In 1995, the last of the Irish industrial schools, St Joseph's Industrial School in Salthill, Galway, shut down.

Today in the Republic of Ireland, children may still be detained in protective custody. The nomenclature has changed from "industrial schools" and "reformatory schools" to "children detention schools". There are five such institutions in the state. Following the closure of St Patrick's in Belfast and Lisnevin in Millisle, the Juvenile Justice Centre at Rathgael, near Bangor, is the only remaining children's detention centre in Northern Ireland.

== The Commission to Inquire into Child Abuse in Ireland ==
=== Child abuse investigation (Ireland) ===
The Commission to Inquire into Child Abuse was established in 2000 with functions including the investigation of abuse of children in institutions in the State. It was dependent on people giving evidence which they did in large numbers.

The conclusion of the report, issued in May 2009, was that over a period going back at least to the 1940s, many children in Industrial Schools in the Republic had been subjected to systematic and sustained physical, sexual, and emotional abuse. It also found that the perpetrators of this violence had been protected by their religious superiors, primarily out of self-interest to maintain the reputations of the institutions concerned. 42 of the 43 conclusions refer to the Industrial Schools.

=== Vaccine trials ===
Vaccine trials in some Industrial Schools were to be investigated by the commission, but were discontinued by the commission in 2003 following Court judgement. In a statement on their website the commission said "The Vaccine Trials Inquiry was a Division of the Investigation Committee. Judicial Review proceedings seeking, inter alia, a declaration that the Order which established the Vaccine Trials Inquiry was ultra vires the Act of 2000, were initiated in November 2003. On 25 November 2003, an undertaking was given to the High Court, by the commission, that it would not conduct any hearings in relation to the matters within the ambit of the Order, until the matter was settled.

The practical effect of this undertaking was that the work of the Division was suspended at that point and never re-commenced, given the subsequent decision of the Court, that the Order was ultra vires the Act."

== See also ==
- List of industrial schools in Ireland
- Category:People detained at industrial schools in the Republic of Ireland
- Magdalen Asylum
- Haut de la Garenne Saint Martin, Jersey.
- List of industrial schools

== Works cited ==
- Raftery, Mary; O'Sullivan, Eoin (2001). Suffer the little children: the inside story of Ireland's industrial schools. New York: Continuum. ISBN 978-0-8264-1337-6.
- Barnes, Jane (1989). Irish industrial schools, 1868-1908: origins and development. Blackrock, Co. Dublin: Irish Academic Press. ISBN 978-0-7165-2426-7.
- Arnold, Bruce (2009). The Irish gulag: how the state betrayed its innocent children. Dublin: Gill & Macmillan. ISBN 978-0-7171-4614-7.
