= Commission to Inquire into Child Abuse =

Investigation into child abuse in Irish residential institutions

The Commission to Inquire into Child Abuse (CICA) was one of a range of measures introduced by the government of Ireland to investigate the extent and effects of abuse on children from 1936 onwards. Commencing its work in 1999, it was commonly known as the Laffoy Commission, after its chairperson, Justice Mary Laffoy. Laffoy resigned as chair in 2003 and was succeeded by Justice Sean Ryan, with the commission becoming known as the Ryan Commission. It published its final public report, commonly referred to as the Ryan report, in 2009.

The commission's remit was to investigate all forms of child abuse in Irish institutions for children; the majority of allegations it investigated related to the system of sixty residential "Reformatory and Industrial Schools" operated by Catholic Church orders, funded and supervised by the Department of Education.

The commission's report said testimony had demonstrated beyond a doubt that the entire system treated children more like prison inmates and slaves than people with legal rights and human potential; that some religious officials encouraged ritual beatings and consistently shielded their orders amid a "culture of self-serving secrecy", and that government inspectors failed to stop the abuses.

Among the more extreme allegations of abuse were beatings and rapes, subjection to naked beatings in public, being forced into oral sex, and subjection to beatings after failed rape attempts by religious brothers. The abuse has been described by some as Ireland's Holocaust. The abuse was said to be "endemic" in the institutions that dealt with boys. The UK based Guardian newspaper, described the abuse as "the stuff of nightmares", citing the adjectives used in the report as being particularly chilling: "systemic, pervasive, chronic, excessive, arbitrary, endemic".

The Report's conclusions section (Chapter 6) supports the overall tenor of the accusations without exception. The commission's recommendations were restricted in scope by two rules imposed by the Irish government, and therefore do not include calls for the prosecution or sanction of any of the parties involved.

The Irish government excluded other institutions; survivors at the time advocated for inclusion of the Magdalene Laundries but these were deemed private. Survivors during the child abuse redress process at the last stage were gagged, while the religious orders were given protection against prosecution.

== Background ==
=== Historical context ===
The history of residential institutions for children in Ireland is outlined in Chapter 2 of the Report. UK Acts of Parliament had provided for:

- Reformatory Schools for younger criminals from 1858 onward, and
- Industrial Schools in Ireland for destitute and/or orphaned children from 1868 onward,

In these schools they were supposed to learn life skills, be fed and educated. These schools were considered an improvement on the workhouse system of poor relief. The harsh system was improved over decades, particularly by the Children Act 1908 (8 Edw. 7. c. 67) that was enacted by the Liberal Government 1905–1915. Though the 2009 Report deals with each type of school separately, they and similar schools are referred to generally as "residential institutions".

Where children were from Catholic families, the Roman Catholic Church in Ireland insisted on supervising their care and upbringing by running most of these institutions in Ireland. A handful of Irish Catholic authors such as Michael McCarthy in 1904 and Frank Hugh O'Donnell in 1908 criticised the Church's un-audited state funding, and the state's inadequate supervision in 1900–1910. They were generally ignored by the growing Nationalist movement that had firm support from the Church, and also by the British administration based in Dublin Castle.

=== Continuance by Irish Free State ===
After the establishment of the Irish Free State in 1922, little was done to update the 1908 Act or to ensure that its rules were observed, particularly those on corporal punishment. The purpose of the Act was to humanise reformatory and industrial schools and orphanages, and to reduce physical punishment. The 1908 Act regulations remained in force in Ireland almost unchanged until the 1970s, while elsewhere in Europe more progressive regimes developed, mainly after 1945. In contrast, the 1941 Children's Act, drafted while Éamon de Valera was briefly Minister of the Department of Education, reduced the minimum age of inmates to below 6 years, allowing small children to be detained because of their parents' poverty.

From the 1850s on day-to-day management had passed to several Orders affiliated with the Irish Catholic Church, as it insisted on educating its younger members. Oversight was the duty of the British administration in Ireland, and then of the Irish Department of Education from 1922 on. 5 Protestant schools had also existed, with the last one closing in 1917. Maintenance costs were paid by the department on a capitation (head-counting) basis, but the internal accounts of each school were never published. Over decades the Orders would typically answer any official complaint by pointing to the low capitation amount.

A major review of the system by Thomas Derrig in 1933–36 left it largely unchanged, as did the 1941 Children's Act. It has been suggested that Derrig refused to reform the system in line with the British reforms of 1923 and 1933 because of his strongly anti-British stance during the Irish independence process in 1916–23. The critical Cussen Report (1936) that followed, and a report in 1946–48 by the Irish-American priest Father Flanagan, were shelved. In 1946, Flanagan, of Boys Town fame, had returned for a visit to his homeland and toured some industrial schools run by the Christian Brothers. He then held a public lecture at the Savoy cinema in Cork at which he called the schools a national disgrace. Minister for Justice Gerald Boland deprecated the priest's remarks saying that he was “not disposed to take any notice of what Monsignor Flanagan said while he was in this country, because his statements were so exaggerated that I did not think people would attach any importance to them."

Archbishop McQuaid of Dublin sought a private report on Artane from Father Moore in 1962, but this was also shelved.

Other bodies such as the Irish Society for the Prevention of Cruelty to Children (ISPCC; before 1956 the NSPCC) were also involved in sending needy children to the institutions, for want of alternatives. Some 60% of their cases were referred by the parents. In the 1940s the Society had pointed out that higher social welfare payments to poor families would be cheaper than paying the capitation amounts to industrial schools.

The numbers of child inmates peaked in the early to mid-1940s. Numbers declined after the introduction of "children's allowance" payments in the 1940s. The Adoption Act 1952 and increased wealth and other social welfare measures reduced the number of needy children in the 1950s. Family shame often sent the mothers of illegitimate children to similarly run Magdalene asylums.

=== Reform starts in the 1960s ===
The OECD reported on Irish schools and levels of education in 1962–68, as an essential part of the process of Ireland's 1973 accession into the EEC, providing the vital external stimulus for reform. Finally the 1970 Kennedy Report, prepared in 1967–70, though flawed in parts, led to the abolition of the schools over the next decade, starting with Artane in 1969. In the interim, tens of thousands of children had been inmates, some from infancy. Despite frequent complaints and enquiries that called for reforms, the official line until the 1990s was that nobody in government, the church or the civil service really knew what was taking place. Notably, Micheál Martin stated on 13 May 1999 that: The concept of the child as a separate individual with rights came late to this country.

== The CICA legislation, 1999–2005 ==
in the 1990s, a series of media revelations led to legal actions by former inmates that the government realised would succeed, resulting in substantial damages and legal costs. Principally the "States of fear" television series made by Mary Raftery for RTÉ caused questions to be raised in the Dáil in April 1999.

In May 1999 the Taoiseach Bertie Ahern promptly apologised: "On behalf of the State and of all citizens of the State, the Government wishes to make a sincere and long overdue apology to the victims of childhood abuse for our collective failure to intervene, to detect their pain, to come to their rescue." In April–May 2000 his government passed the "Commission to Inquire into Child Abuse Act, 2000". The institutions were renamed "residential institutions" inclusively comprising "a school, an industrial school, a reformatory school, an orphanage, a hospital, a children’s home and any other place where children are cared for other than as members of their families. The Commission to Inquire into Child Abuse (CICA) was initially envisaged as an independent statutory body for the former inmates to record their experiences. Under a 2002 Act a "Redress Board" was created alongside CICA, which would pay compensation as recommended.

CICA's investigations were made through two sub-committees:

- A Confidential Committee that allowed the complainants to recite their experiences "in a confidential setting".
- A more pro-active Investigation Committee where witnesses could be compelled to attend.

Though funded by the Department of Education, the CICA has found itself occasionally hindered by it and by various church bodies, particularly for lack of documents. As a result, its first chairman, Judge Laffoy, resigned in 2003, in part because of a lengthy review process that caused a 9-month delay. This review was sponsored by the department and headed by Sean Ryan, a senior barrister, who then became CICA's next chairman.

Mr Ryan's appointment was accompanied by a government comment by Noel Dempsey that he was also to be made a judge. This was a surprise at the time, as Irish High Court judges are limited in number by law, and no vacancies then existed. Questions arose on the impartiality of CICA, but in the event its final Report has been thoroughly researched. CICA's limitations were imposed by the 2000 Act, and it reconsidered its approach and focus in the "Emergence Hearings" which began in mid-2004, requiring all the parties involved to complete a series of questionnaires. It also published a number of interim reports.

Following the Emergence Hearings the 2000 Act was amended by a further Act in 2005. A principal reform (section 8) was to prohibit the identification of an alleged abuser unless convicted of the abuse in question.

Notably, while every witness to the Commission gave evidence of frequent corporal punishment, applied contrary to the regulations and therefore criminally, no Church witness came forward to certify a single such case. Difficulties arose where complainants or the accused were involved in parallel criminal or civil cases, such as the vaccine trials performed on inmate children. With such divergent views the CICA's task has been difficult and contentious, but it has agreed with the evidence given by the complainants. Given Mr. Ahern's general apology in 1999, it would be hard to conclude otherwise.

== Establishment and functions ==
The commission was first established on an administrative basis in May 1999, under Judge Mary Laffoy. The first objective set for the commission was to consider the broad terms of reference then provided to it, determine if these needed refining, and recommend to Government the powers and safeguards it would need to do its work effectively. The Commission reported to the Government in September and October 1999. The commission to Inquire into Child Abuse Act, 2000 (the Act) was enacted on 26 April 2000. The 2000 Act followed closely the recommendations in the reports of the non-statutory Commission, and was extended by the commission to Inquire into Child Abuse (Amendment) Act, 2005.

Judge Laffoy announced her intention to resign on 2 September 2003, following the announcement by the Department of Education and Science of a review relating to the commission's scope. In her letter of resignation she stated that "... the cumulative effect of those factors, each of which has been characterised by long periods of uncertainty for the Commission, has effectively negatived the guarantee of independence in the performance of its functions [...] and has militated against the Commission being able to perform its statutory functions as envisaged by the Oireachtas with reasonable expedition." She was succeeded by Justice Sean Ryan.

The Statutory Commission established under the 2000–2005 Acts had four primary functions:

- to listen to victims of childhood abuse who want to recount their experiences to a sympathetic forum;
- to fully investigate all allegations of abuse made to it, except where the victim does not wish for an investigation;
- to consider whether the way institutions were managed, administered, supervised and regulated contributed to the occurrence of abuse and
- to publish a report on its findings to the general public, with recommendations to address the effects of abuse on those who suffered and to prevent future abuse of children in institutions.

A "child" was defined to be anyone under the age of 18, an "institution" was any place where children were cared for other than as members of their families, and four types of abuse were included in the commission's mandate:

- Physical abuse – infliction of, or failure to prevent, physical injury to the child.
- Sexual abuse – the use of the child for sexual arousal or sexual gratification.
- Neglect – failure to care for the child which risks or causes serious impairment or serious adverse effects.
- Emotional abuse – any other acts or omissions towards the child which risk or cause serious impairment or serious adverse effects.

The Commission worked through two complementary teams. The "Confidential Committee" provided a private forum for witnesses to "recount in full the abuse suffered by them in an atmosphere that is sympathetic to, and understanding of, them, and as informally as is possible in the circumstances." [§4 (b) of the 2005 Act]. This committee's report was not permitted to identify witnesses, or persons against whom they made allegations, or the institutions in which they alleged they were abused. There was "no opportunity for anyone involved to challenge the veracity of the statements made."

The "Investigation Committee" on the other hand heard evidence from witnesses who wished to have their allegations investigated. For this reason, respondents from Religious Orders and others could also give evidence and might be compelled to attend and/or produce documents required by the committee. All parties were entitled to legal representation and to cross examine. 26 public hearings were held in 2005 and transcripts published, but most hearings were held in private.

== Public report, 2009 ==
The commission's report was published on 20 May 2009 in five volumes with an executive summary containing 43 conclusions and 20 recommendations.

=== Allegations and their extent ===
The report dealt with allegations collected over a period of nine years from 2000 to 2008. These related to experiences ranging from 1914 to the opening of the commission. Hearings were held in Ireland, the UK and elsewhere. Of the approximately 25,000 children who had attended the institutions in the time period concerned, around 1,500 persons came forward with complaints to the commission. Commission records show that 474 claims of physical abuse and 253 claims of sexual abuse were made by boys against the institutions in that period. Records show that 383 claims of physical abuse and 128 claims of sexual abuse were made by girls against institutions over the years concerned. These claims covered all levels of abuse from the most serious down, and were made against both religious and lay personnel. The majority of sexual abuse claims by girls were against staff that should have been supervised by the religious orders.

Among some of the strongest abuse claims: one person described how they attempted to tell nuns they had been molested by an ambulance driver, only to be "stripped naked and whipped by four nuns to 'get the devil out of you'". Another described how they were removed from their bed and "made to walk around naked with other boys whilst brothers used their canes and flicked at their penis". Yet another was "tied to a cross and raped whilst others masturbated at the side".

=== Conclusions ===
Physical and emotional abuse and neglect were features of the institutions. Sexual abuse occurred in many of them, particularly boys' institutions. Schools were run in a severe, regimented manner that imposed unreasonable and oppressive discipline on children and even on staff.

Physical abuse. Personnel in the reformatory and industrial schools depended on rigid control by means of severe corporal punishment and the fear of such punishment. A climate of fear, created by pervasive, excessive and arbitrary punishment, permeated most of the institutions and all those run for boys. Children lived with the daily terror of not knowing where the next beating was coming from.

Sexual abuse. Sexual abuse was endemic in boys' institutions. The schools investigated revealed a substantial level of sexual abuse of boys in care that extended over a range from improper touching and fondling to rape with violence. Perpetrators of abuse were able to operate undetected for long periods at the core of institutions. When confronted with evidence of sexual abuse, the response of the religious authorities was to transfer the offender to another location where, in many instances, he was free to abuse again. The safety of children in general was not a consideration. The situation in girls' institutions was different. Although girls were subjected to predatory sexual abuse by male employees or visitors or in outside placements, sexual abuse was not systemic in girls' schools.

Neglect. Poor standards of physical care were reported by most male and female complainants. Children were frequently hungry and food was inadequate, inedible and badly prepared in many schools. Accommodation was cold, spartan and bleak. Sanitary provision was primitive in most boys' schools and general hygiene facilities were poor.

Emotional abuse. Witnesses spoke of being belittled and ridiculed on a daily basis. Private matters such as bodily functions and personal hygiene were used as opportunities for degradation and humiliation. Personal and family denigration was widespread. There was constant criticism and verbal abuse and children were told they were worthless.

Supervision by the Department of Education. The system of inspection by the department was fundamentally flawed and incapable of being effective. Complaints by parents and others made to the department were not properly investigated. The department did not apply the standards in the rules and their own guidelines when investigating complaints, but sought to protect and defend the religious Congregations and the schools. The department dealt inadequately with complaints about sexual abuse, which were generally dismissed or ignored.

=== Limits of scope ===
The scope of the CICA's recommendations was limited from the outset to two categories; a limitation that has been widely criticised. In essence, the Irish taxpayer paid for the commission's costs and any compensation, but without knowing who exactly was to blame, and without prosecutions for what were clearly criminal acts or omissions. CICA acknowledged that it .. was required to make recommendations under two headings:

(i)To alleviate or otherwise address the effects of the abuse on those who suffered

(ii)To prevent where possible and reduce the incidence of abuse of children in institutions and to protect children from such abuse.

Name and shame. It was originally intended that abusers would be publicly named in the commission's report. However the commission was blocked from doing so by a legal challenge from the Christian Brothers. The Brothers received permission to deal with abusers anonymously. Thus the report does not state whether all abusers were or were not members of the religious orders in charge of the schools, or whether external parties were involved.

External impact. The report does not consider the effects of the abuse on the psychological welfare of the parents of children who were in the control of the system. That at least some parents were concerned about their children was clearly shown by the lengths to which one father went to obtain the return of his children in the celebrated case in re Doyle, which was the subject of the 2002 film Evelyn.

Motivation. The conclusions of the report do not consider the motivations of the abusers; although the inclusion of a financial report by the accountancy firm of Mazars, and various financial references combine to create an impression of financial motivation, this is not discussed or challenged. The report refers to, but makes no attempt to explain, the enthusiasm of the judiciary and the ISPCC for incarcerating children.

== Reactions to the report ==
=== Irish reaction ===
The Irish Times called the report "a devastating indictment of Church and State authorities," and "the map of an Irish hell." "The sheer scale and longevity of the torment inflected on defenceless children – over 800 known abusers in over 200 Catholic institutions during a period of 35 years – should alone make it clear that it was not accidental or opportunistic but systematic. Abuse was not a failure of the system. It was the system."

Irish President Mary McAleese called the abuse "an atrocious betrayal of love", saying: "My heart goes out to the victims of this terrible injustice, an injustice compounded by the fact that they had to suffer in silence for so long."

Irish Minister for Finance, Brian Lenihan, called for religious orders to increase their contributions to the State compensation fund.

Minister for Justice, Equality and Law Reform, Dermot Ahern, said the report would be examined by members of the Garda Síochána to check for possible criminal prosecutions.

A book of solidarity was opened at the Mansion House in Dublin, with more than 2,000 people having signed it by 23 May 2009. Lord Mayor of Dublin, Eibhlin Byrne, described how citizens were approaching her to personally express their solidarity as well.

Cardinal Seán Brady (leader of the Catholic Church in Ireland) said he was "profoundly sorry and deeply ashamed that children suffered in such awful ways in these institutions. This report makes it clear that great wrong and hurt were caused to some of the most vulnerable children in our society. It documents a shameful catalogue of cruelty: neglect, physical, sexual and emotional abuse, perpetrated against children." He declared that anyone responsible for abusing children in Catholic-run institutions should be held to account. This was echoed by Most Reverend Vincent Nichols (leader of the Catholic Church in England and Wales) "no matter how long ago it happened".

Father Michael Mernagh, the 70-year-old Augustinian priest who recently made a 272 km pilgrimage from Cobh to Dublin in atonement for the church's response to clerical child sex abuse said he was appalled at the extent and longevity of the abuse, "particularly at the role of the state and the government that seem to have colluded in actually encouraging children to be brought into these institutions to keep up the numbers."

The report itself cannot be used for criminal proceedings (in part because the Christian Brothers successfully sued the commission to prevent its members from being named in the report) and victims say they feel "cheated and deceived" by the lack of prosecutions, and "because of that this inquiry is deeply flawed, it's incomplete and many might call it a whitewash."

Counselling services reported a significant rise in calls following the release of the report, with some centres being inundated despite bringing in extra volunteers. Callers included people who had never spoken of their abuse before, publication of the report having re-opened their old wounds.

On 25 May 2009, the Irish Times printed the reaction of Diarmuid Martin, the Archbishop of Dublin, who said (partially quoting a correspondent),

"'there is always a price to pay for not responding'. The church will have to pay that price in terms of its credibility. The first thing the church has to do is to move out of any mode of denial. Where the church is involved in social care it should be in the vanguard. That is different to a situation in which the church proclaims that it is in the vanguard.... in a very short time another report on the sexual abuse of children will be published, this time about how such abuse was managed in the Archdiocese of Dublin of which I am archbishop."

On 10 June 2009 a solidarity march for victims of abuse was held in Dublin, going from the Garden of Remembrance in Parnell Square to Leinster House.

=== Westminster controversy ===
The Catholic Archbishop of Westminster, Vincent Nichols, was quoted as saying:

I think of those in religious orders and some of the clergy in Dublin who have to face these facts from their past, which instinctively and quite naturally they’d rather not look at. That takes courage, and also we shouldn't forget that this account today will also overshadow all of the good that they also did.

The quote sparked controversy, with John Kelly of Irish Survivors of Child Abuse, saying it was an "outrageous statement to make".

=== International reaction ===
The findings were covered by media from across the world in the days following their publication. As of 23 May 2009, letters were still being sent to The Guardian in the UK and The Sydney Morning Herald in Australia, expressing horror at the revelations. The Canberra Times described the publication as a "major new report", reporting that Australia's clergy would be examined for any links to the "grim sexual abuse allegations" from Ireland. Arab News, an English language newspaper from the Middle East, said the report made "appalling reading". The Taipei Times reported on the "shocking scale" of sexual and physical abuse in Ireland's educational institutions. American networks, including ABC News and CNN, covered the story, as did the BBC, CBC, and Sky News. Time reviewed the "most depraved acts" committed in its coverage of the story. The front page of 21 May 2009 edition of The New York Times told of "Ireland's shameful tragedy", leading to reactions describing a "Nuremberg trial, Irish-style, with no names, no prosecution and no court appearances."

In June 2009, on a visit to the Vatican, bishops Martin and Brady heard from Pope Benedict XVI that he had: "... urged them to establish the truth of what has happened, ensure that justice is done for all, put in place the measures that will prevent these abuses happening again, with a view to healing for survivors."

== 2002 Compensation deal ==
An "indemnity deal" had secretly been signed on 5 June 2002 between two representatives of the Conference of Religious of Ireland (Cori), an umbrella group representing 138 religious congregations on behalf of 18 religious Orders that had run the residential institutions, and the Minister Michael Woods. It indemnified the Orders from legal action, whereby any costs would now be met by the Irish taxpayer, in return for a transfer of property and assets to the government worth €128 million. No representatives of the victims were involved in these negotiations. The original plan was to provide adequate funds for the Redress Board, but in the interim an unexpectedly large number of claimants has come forward. Not only was the deal inadequate to cover the costs of CICA itself, let alone any compensation, but it remained secret until revealed by the media in January 2003. Further, the deal was completed under a caretaker government, at the time of the 2002 Irish general election, on the last day possible, and could thus neither be approved by Cabinet nor be debated in the Dáil. Given that Catholic Orders insisted on educating all the children in question, it unfairly imposed indirect costs on non-Catholic or non-Christian taxpayers.

In the circumstances, and given a net cost to the Irish taxpayer approaching €1,000,000,000, its legality was questioned. Minister Michael Woods was criticised by Fine Gael leader Enda Kenny amidst calls to reopen negotiations. The religious Orders involved initially refused to reopen compensation negotiation proceedings. In late 2009 negotiations with 18 church groups were held, and it seems that the letters of offer were accepted as such by government, without proof of any effort to increase the amounts offered. Then in April 2010 an agreement was announced whereby another €348 million would be paid. The 2010 announcement also confirmed for the first time that the entire process since 1999 had led to ".. costs of well over a billion euro being incurred by the State", at a time when Ireland was still in a Post-2008 Irish economic downturn

The Republic of Ireland's government is also aware of the enormous compensation awards made in the US, where prosecution of alleged criminals is more robust"".

The indemnity deal complicated the question of ultimate blame. For decades the Government and Department of Education were to blame for lack of oversight, various parts of the Catholic Church refused to reform internal systems, the police generally ignored complaints, and the courts sent small children to the institutions with little concern for their rights. The 2002 deal has appeared in hindsight to be a well-intentioned, but unsatisfactory attempt at a quick fix.

== Church of Ireland Institutions ==
Campaigners are also engaged in trying to extend the redress scheme to victims of institutional abuse in places such as the Bethany Mother and Child Home in Rathgar. Often girls "in trouble" were brought to the home by a Protestant minister. While these were affiliated to the Church of Ireland, and used by its parishioners, it is claimed the home was not run by the church itself, however members of the church sat on the board of the home and the home was designated by the Church of Ireland as a suitable place for Protestant girls on remand, and recognised by the courts as a place of detention. The Bethany Survivors Group continues to campaign to the newly elected government for inclusion in the redress scheme.

Some residential institutions founded and run by members of the Church of Ireland such as Stewart's Hospital and Miss Carr's Children's Home, due to their connection with the Eastern Health Board do come under the remit of the redress board scheme and thus, victims are entitled to petition it for compensation. These were added to the redress list following complaints and campaigns that they were being excluded.

Campaigners also campaigned for a number of Protestant run children's residences and former orphanages such as The Smyly Homes which were regulated by the state, and subject to departmental inspection, to be included in the Redress scheme. There are eleven Mrs. Smyly's homes which the government has been in dialogue with over some contribution to the redress fund.

Former residents of other homes and orphanages which were designated by the Church of Ireland for Protestant children such as Westbank Orphanage, Greystones and Ovoca House in Wicklow, have demanded inclusion in the 2002 redress scheme, and an apology.

Some Church of Ireland run institutions for older children like the Cottage Home and Birds Nest have been included in the list of institutions for the Redress Scheme, since these homes were found to have allowed a vaccines to be tested on their residents in trials by the Department of Medical Microbiology at University College Dublin.

== Trudder House ==
In 1975, Trudder House in Newtownmountkennedy, County Wicklow, was set up by Dublin Committee for Travelling People, a voluntary group, a residential home for children from the travelling community who had appeared before the courts. It was funded by the Eastern Health Board, and boys were sent to the home after being sentenced by the courts. In August 1985, New Hibernia magazine reported irregularities at the home and allegations of beatings and homosexual child abuse. In the mid-1990s some 19 young travelers had made allegations of sexual abuse against six people associated with the residential home. The home closed in April 1995. Victims are entitled to redress from the Redress Board.

== See also ==
- Abuse by priests in Roman Catholic orders
- Bon Secours Mother and Baby Home
- Catholic sexual abuse scandal in Ireland
- Catholic sex abuse cases
- Ferns Report
- Industrial Schools in Ireland
- Magdalene asylum
- Mother and Baby Homes Commission of Investigation
- Murphy Report
- Sexual abuse scandal in Dublin archdiocese
- St Joseph's Industrial School, Letterfrack
