= List of Christian Brothers schools =

The following is a list of the schools, colleges, and other educational institutions founded, run or staffed (in any capacity) by the Congregation of Christian Brothers (sometimes called the Irish Christian Brothers) since 1802. Some schools no longer exist, some are incorporated into new schools and some have changed their names. The names of defunct schools are included but linked to their successor schools, if any. Some schools have connections with other religious institutes as well as with the Christian Brothers. In addition, many schools no longer have Christian Brothers on staff, but still maintain their connection to the Congregation.

== Africa ==
=== Liberia ===
- St. Martin's Catholic High School – Gbarnga, Bong County (est. 2009)
- Carroll High School – Yekepa, Nimba County (est. 1969)

=== Sierra Leone ===
- St Francis High School – Makeni, Bombali District

=== South Africa ===
- Christian Brothers' College, Boksburg – Boksburg, Gauteng (est. 1935; Christian Brothers withdrew)
- Christian Brothers' College, Mount Edmund – Pretoria, Gauteng (est. 1922; Christian Brothers withdrew)
- Veritas College – Springs, Gauteng (est. 1964 as St. Brendan's CBC; merged 1992 with Our Lady of Mercy Dominican Convent to form Veritas College)
- Christian Brothers' College, St John's Parklands – Cape Town, Western Cape
- Christian Brothers' College, St Joseph's – Bloemfontein, Free State
- St Dominic's College – Welkom, Free State
- St. Boniface High School – Kimberley, Northern Cape (est. 1951; Christian Brothers withdrew)
- St Patrick's Christian Brothers’ College – Kimberley, Northern Cape
- Veritas College – Springs, Gauteng

Former schools

- St. Columba's High School – Cape Town, Western Cape (1941–1990)
- Mariasdal Boys High School – Tweespruit, Free State, (1970–1996) (Merged with Mariasdal Girls High School(Franciscan Sisters of Siessen)

=== Tanzania ===
- Edmund Rice Sinon Secondary School – Arusha, Arusha Region

=== Zambia ===
- St. John's Secondary School – Mongu, Western Province (est. 1962 by the Capuchin Order; Christian Brothers took over in 1967)

=== Zimbabwe ===
- Christian Brothers College – Bulawayo (est. 1953)

== Americas ==
=== Argentina ===
- Colegio Cardenal Newman – Buenos Aires (est. 1948)

=== Canada ===
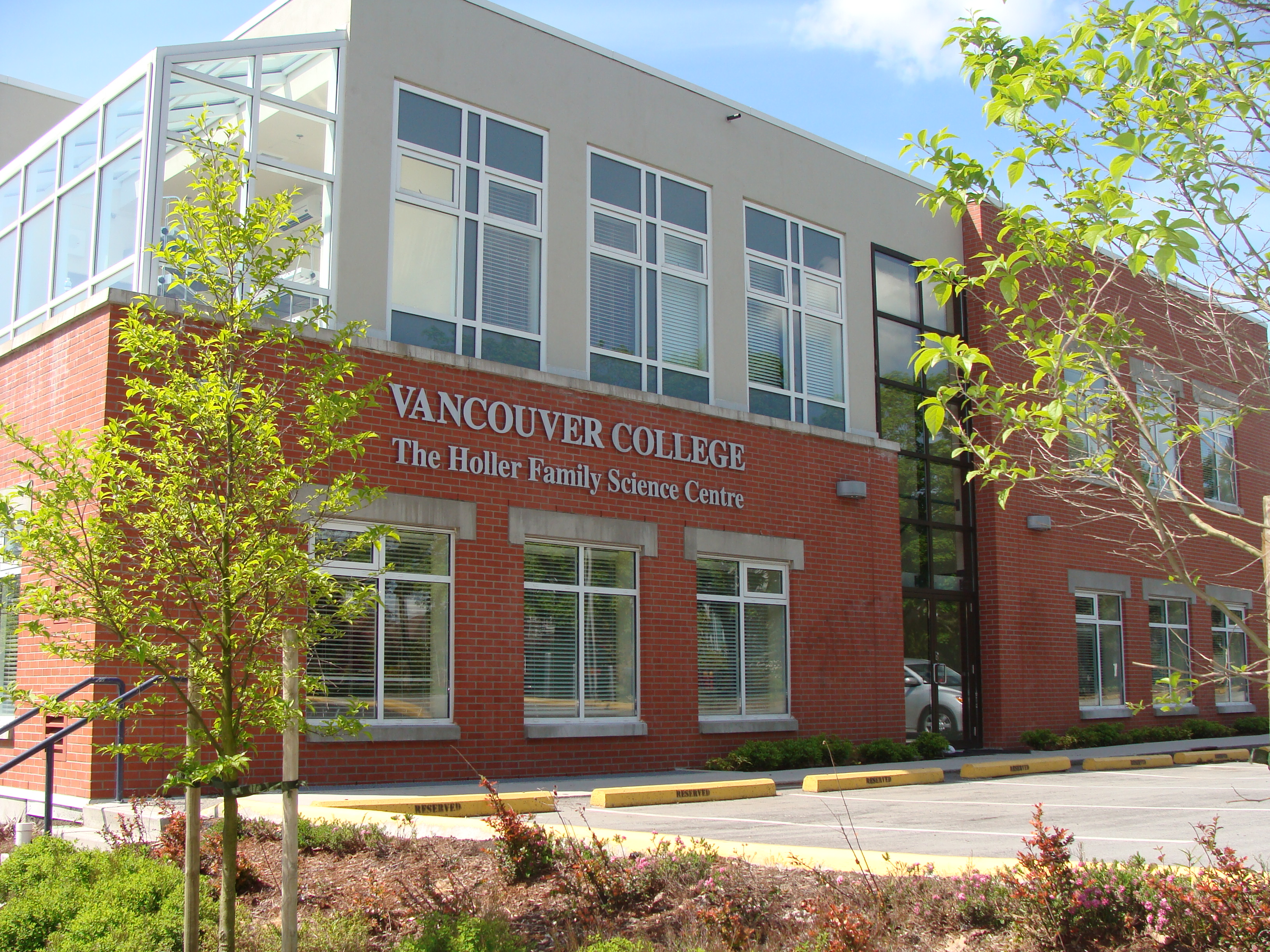
Vancouver College in Vancouver, Canada.

- Chaminade College School – Toronto, Ontario (est. 1964; Christian Brothers left in 1988)
- O'Grady Catholic High School – Prince George, British Columbia
- St. Patrick's High School – Quebec City, Québec
- St. Thomas More Collegiate – Burnaby, British Columbia (est. 1965)
- Vancouver College – Vancouver, British Columbia (est. 1922)

Former schools

- Saint Louis College - Victoria, British Columbia (est 1864; closed 1968)
- Brother Edmund Rice Catholic Secondary School – Toronto, Ontario (est. 1977; closed 2001)
- Regina High School – Corner Brook, Newfoundland and Labrador (closed)

=== Dominica ===
- St. Mary's Academy – Roseau, Saint George Parish

=== Peru ===
- Colegio Fé y Alegría No. 26 – Lima, Lima Province
- Colegio Mundo Mejor – Chimbote, Santa Province

=== United States ===
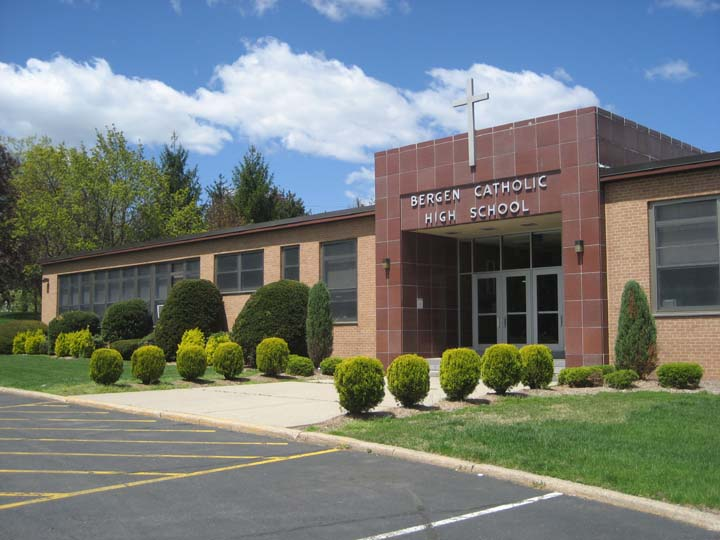
Bergen Catholic High School in Oradell, New Jersey

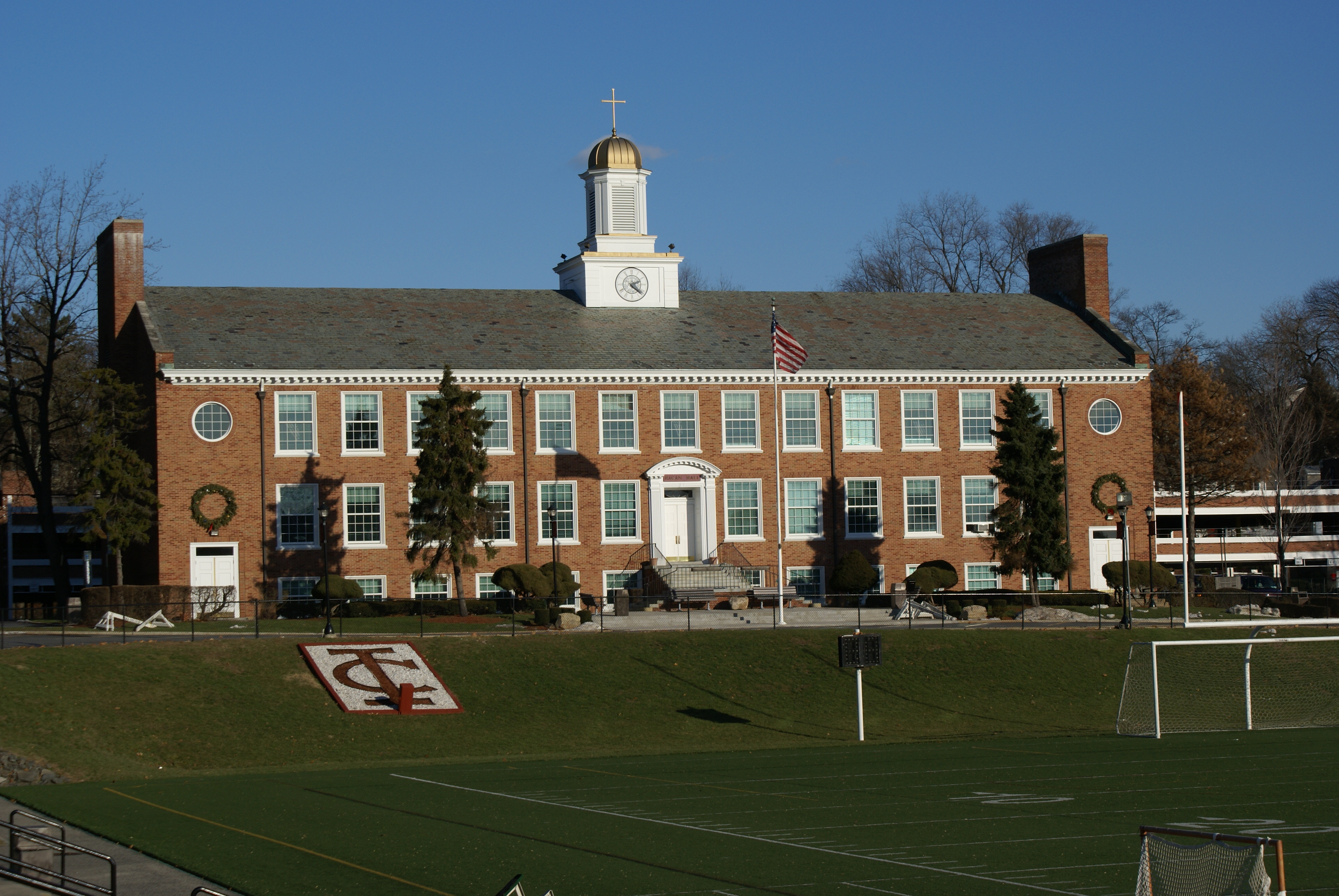
Iona University in New Rochelle, New York

- All Hallows High School – The Bronx, New York City, New York (est. 1909)
- Bergen Catholic High School – Oradell, New Jersey (est. 1955)
- Bishop Hendricken High School – Warwick, Rhode Island (est. 1959; Christian Brothers left in 2011)
- Bishop Kearney High School – Irondequoit, New York (est. 1962)
- Brother Rice High School – Chicago, Illinois (est. 1956)
- Brother Rice High School – Bloomfield Hills, Michigan (est. 1960)
- Butte Central Catholic High School – Butte, Montana (est. 1892; Christian Brothers left in 1986)
- Catholic Memorial School – West Roxbury, Boston, Massachusetts (est. 1957)
- Cantwell-Sacred Heart of Mary High School – Montebello, California (est. 1991 as a lay-administered; Christian Brothers' community closed in 1990)
- Cardinal Hayes High School – The Bronx, New York City, New York (est. 1941; Christian Brothers left in the 1960s)
- Damien Memorial School – Honolulu, Hawaii (est. 1962)
- Iona University – New Rochelle, New York (est. 1940)
- Iona Preparatory School – New Rochelle, New York (est. 1916)
- Leo Catholic High School – Chicago, Illinois (est. 1926; Christian Brothers left in 1992)
- Monsignor Farrell High School – Staten Island, New York City, New York (est. 1961)
- Notre Dame-Bishop Gibbons High School – Schenectady, New York (est. 1975; Christian Brothers left)
- O'Dea High School – Seattle, Washington (est. 1923; Christian Brothers left in 2014)
- Palma School – Salinas, California (est. 1951)
- Sacred Heart of Jesus School – Manhattan, New York City, New York (est. 1896)
- Seton Catholic Preparatory High School – Chandler, Arizona (est. 1954; Christian Brothers left in 1995)
- St. John Neumann High School – Naples, Florida (est. 1980)
- St. Joseph Catholic School – Madison, Mississippi (est. 1870 by the Sisters of Mercy; Christian Brothers subsequently became co-sponsors)
- St. Laurence High School – Burbank, Illinois (est. 1961)
- St. Patrick-St. Vincent High School – Vallejo, California (est. 1968; Christian Brothers left in 1993)
- Tampa Catholic High School – Tampa, Florida (est. 1962)
- Trinity Catholic High School – Ocala, Florida (est. 2000; Christian Brothers left in 2015; school withdrew from the Edmund Rice Schools Network in 2015)

Former schools

Rice High School in New York City

- All Saints School – Manhattan, New York City, New York (1890s–2011)
- Archbishop Curley-Notre Dame High School – Miami, Florida (1981–2017)
- Bishop Gibbons High School – Schenectady, New York (1958–1975; merged into Notre Dame-Bishop Gibbons High School)
- Blessed Sacrament-St. Gabriel High School – New Rochelle, New York (1940–2013)
- Briscoe Memorial School – Kent, Washington (closed 1970)
- Cantwell High School – Montebello, California (1946–1991; merged into Cantwell-Sacred Heart of Mary High School)
- Commander John J. Shea School – Manhattan, New York City, New York (closed 1975)
- Essex Catholic High School – Newark, New Jersey (1957–2003)
- Iona Grammar School – New Rochelle, New York (closed 2013; merged into Iona Preparatory School)
- Power Memorial Academy – Manhattan, New York City, New York (1931–1984)
- Rice High School – Manhattan, New York City, New York (1938–2011)
- St. Cecilia School – Manhattan, New York City, New York (closed 1991)
- St. John's Indian School – Komatke, Arizona (closed 1993)
- St. Lucy School – Manhattan, New York City, New York (1915–2000)
- St. Patrick High School – Vallejo, California (1968–1987; merged into St. Patrick-St. Vincent High School)

=== Uruguay ===
- Stella Maris College – Montevideo, Montevideo Department (est. 1955)

== Asia ==
=== India ===
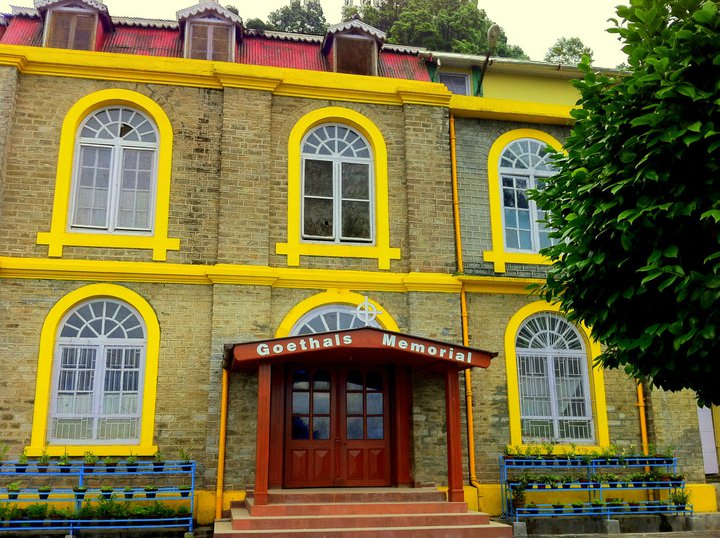
Goethals Memorial School in Kurseong, West Bengal

- Goethals Memorial School – Kurseong, West Bengal (est. 1907)
- Jagruti High School – Surat, Gujarat
- Our Lady of Salvation High School – Mumbai, Maharashtra (1968–2018)
- Regina Mundi High School – Chicalim, Goa (est. 1970s)
- St. Augustine's High School Vasai |https://staugustinesschoolvasai.in– Vasai, Maharashtra (est. 1970)
- St. Columba's School – New Delhi, National Capital Territory of Delhi (est. 1941)
- St. Edmund's School – Shillong, Meghalaya (est. 1916)
- St. Edmund's College – Shillong, Meghalaya (est. 1924)
- St. Edward's School – Shimla, Himachal Pradesh (est. 1925)
- St. John's High School – Chandigarh (est. 1959)
- St. Joseph's Pre-University College – Bajpe, Mangalore, Dakshina Kannada, Karnataka - (Christian Brothers no longer manage this school)
- St. Joseph's College – Kolkata, West Bengal (est. 1890)
- St Aloysius Higher Secondary School District of Kollam – Kollam, Kerala (est. 1896)
- St Joseph's College – Nainital, Uttarakhand (est. 1888)
- St. Mary's High School – Mount Abu, Rajasthan (est. 1887)
- St. Mary's Orphanage & Day School – Kolkata, West Bengal (est. 1848)
- St. Michael's High School – Patna, Bihar (Christian Brothers left in 1968; became a Jesuit school)
- St. Patrick's Higher Secondary School – Asansol, West Bengal (est. 1877 as a Jesuit scholasticate; became a Christian Brothers school in 1890)
- St. Peter's School – Mawjrong, Meghalaya
- St. Vincent's High and Technical School – Asansol, West Bengal (est. 1877)

== Europe ==
=== Gibraltar ===
Former school

- Christian Brothers School – Gibraltar (1835–1970s)

=== Ireland ===
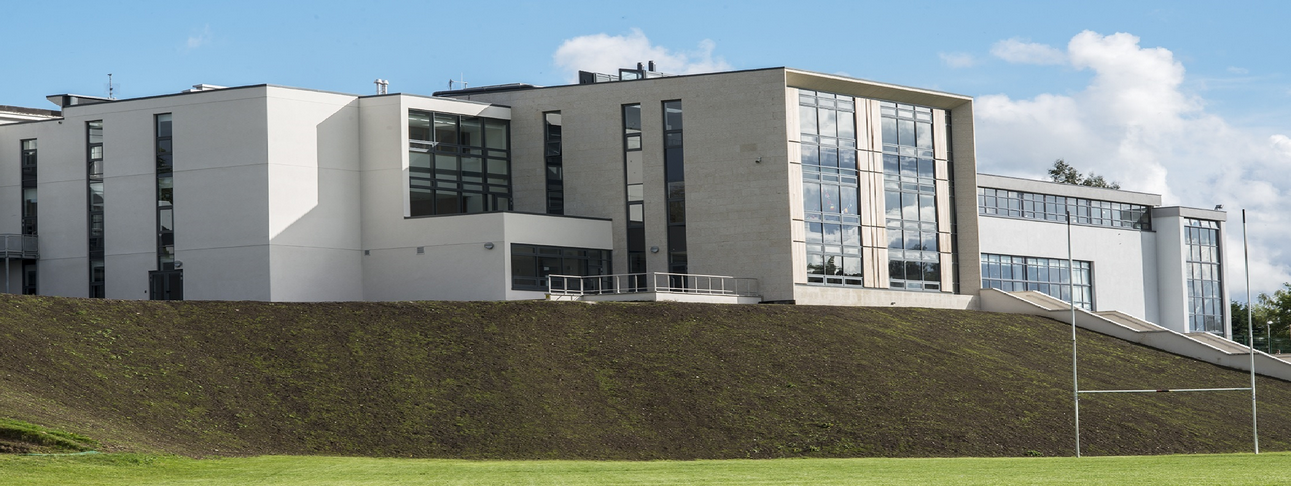
CBC Monkstown in Monkstown, Dublin

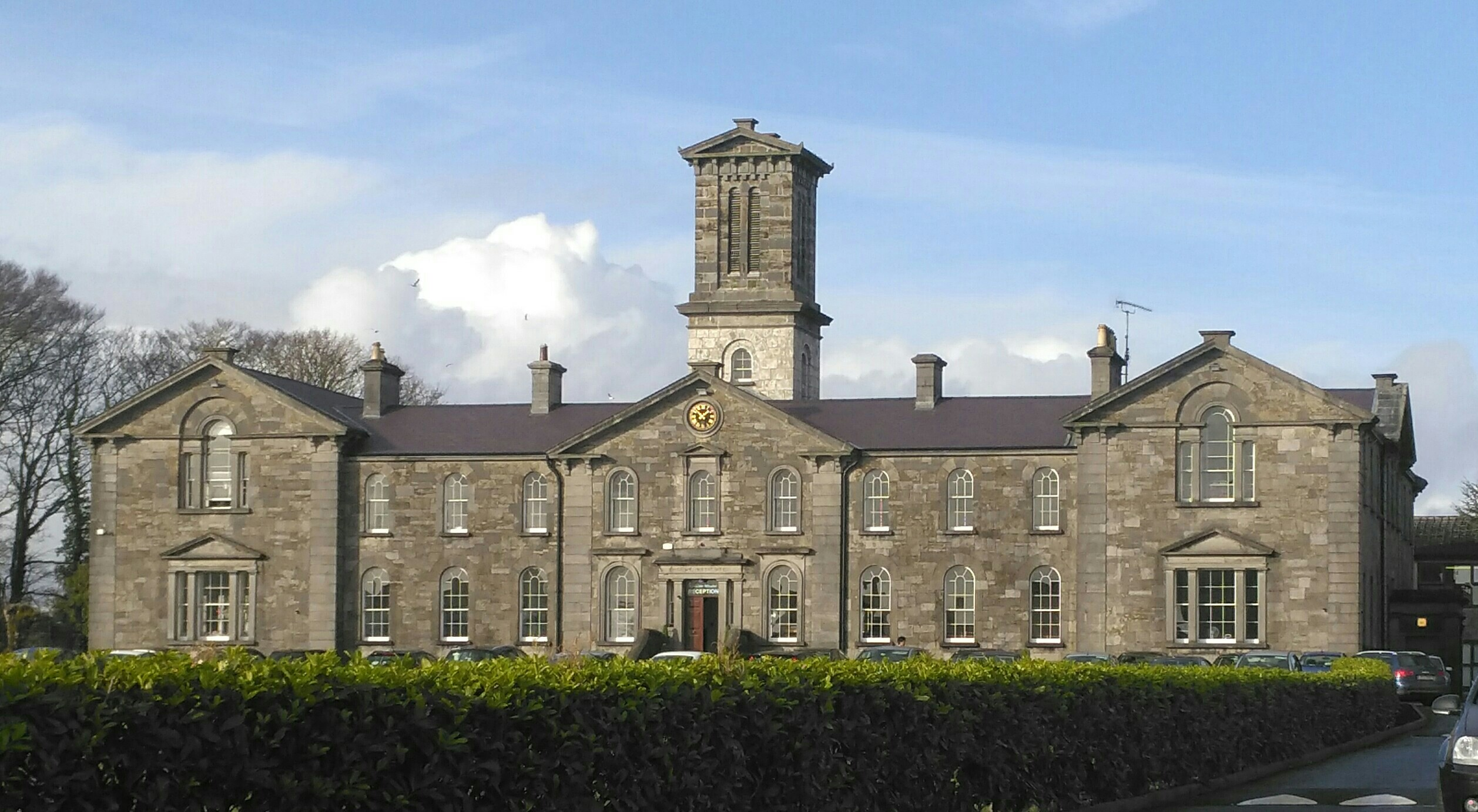
Coláiste Mhuire in Mullingar, County Westmeath

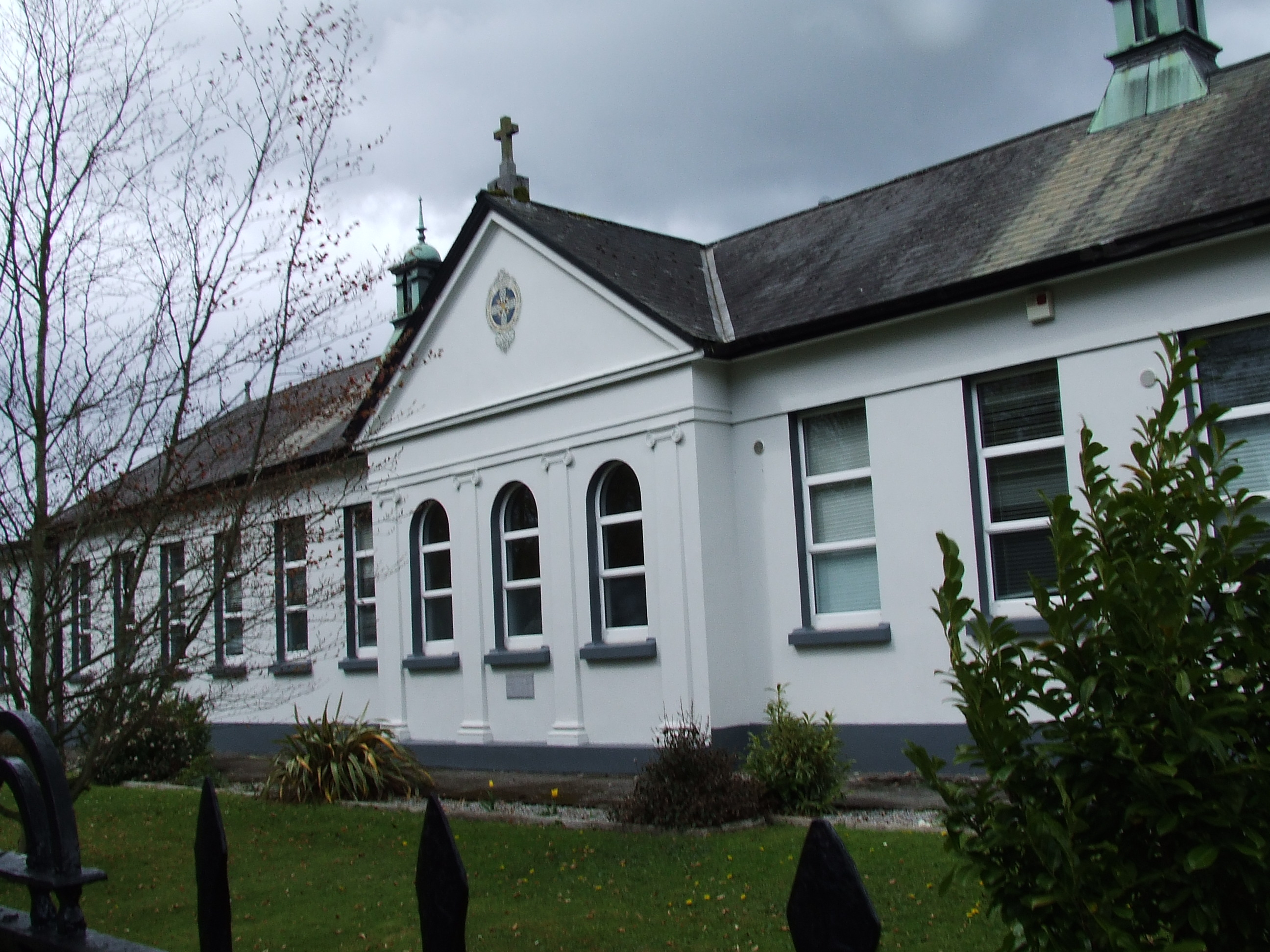
Our Lady's Secondary School in Templemore, County Tipperary

- The Abbey School – Tipperary, County Tipperary (est. 1955)
- Ardscoil Rís – Dublin, County Dublin (est. 1972)
- Ardscoil Rís – Limerick, County Limerick (est. 1963)
- Arklow CBS – Arklow, County Wicklow (est. 1961)
- Blarney Street CBS – Cork, County Cork
- CBC Cork – Cork, County Cork (est. 1888)
- C.B.C. Monkstown – Monkstown, Dublin (est. 1856)
- CBS Carrick-on-Suir – Carrick-on-Suir, County Tipperary (est. 1805)
- CBS Charleville – Charleville, County Cork (est. 1866)
- CBS Ennis – Ennis, County Clare (est. 1827)
- CBS Cashel – Cashel, County Tipperary
- CBS Ennistymon – Ennistymon, County Clare (est. 1824)
- CBS High School Clonmel – Clonmel, County Tipperary (est. 1899)
- CBS James Street – James's Street, Dublin, County Dublin (est. 1960)
- CBS Kilkenny – Kilkenny, County Kilkenny (est. 1860)
- CBS New Ross – New Ross, County Wexford (est. 1849 as St. Joseph's CBS)
- CBS Primary School, Carrick-on-Suir – Carrick-on-Suir, County Tipperary (est. 1806)
- CBS Primary School, Kilkenny – Kilkenny, County Kilkenny (est. 1953)
- CBS Primary School, Wexford – Wexford, County Wexford (est. 1939)
- CBS Roscommon – Roscommon, County Roscommon (est. 1935)
- CBS Sexton Street – Limerick, County Limerick (est. 1816)
- CBS Thurles – Thurles, County Tipperary (est. 1816)
- CBS Westland Row – Dublin, County Dublin (est. 1864)
- Clonkeen College – Blackrock, Dublin, County Dublin (est. 1970)
- Coláiste Éamann Rís – Callan, County Kilkenny (est. 1983)
- Coláiste Éamonn Rís – Wexford, County Wexford (est. 1849)
- Coláiste Éanna – Ballyroan, Dublin, County Dublin (est. 1967)
- Coláiste Eoin – Booterstown, Dún Laoghaire–Rathdown (est. 1969)
- Coláiste Mhuire – Mullingar, County Westmeath (est. 1856 as the Hevey Institute)
- Coláiste Phádraig – Lucan, County Dublin (est. 1969)
- Coláiste Rís – Dundalk, County Louth (est. 1869 as CBS Dundalk)
- Deerpark CBS – Cork, County Cork (est. 1828)
- Drimnagh Castle Primary School – Drimnagh, Dublin, County Dublin (est. 1957)
- Drimnagh Castle Secondary School – Drimnagh, Dublin, County Dublin (est. 1954)
- Dungarvan CBS – Dungarvan, County Waterford (est. 1807)
- Edmund Rice Primary School – Tramore, County Waterford (est. 1866 as CBS Primary School)
- Gaelcholáiste Mhuire AG – Cork, County Cork (est. 1961)
- The Green – Tralee, County Kerry (est. 1927)
- Marino Institute of Education – Dublin, County Dublin (est. 1881 as St. Mary's College)
- Midleton CBS Secondary School – Midleton, County Cork (est. 1867)
- Mitchelstown CBS – Mitchelstown, County Cork (est. 1857)
- Mount Sion Primary School – Waterford, County Waterford (est. 1803)
- Naas CBS – Naas, County Kildare (est. 1871)
- North Monastery Secondary School CBS – Cork, County Cork (est. 1811)
- Oatlands College – Mount Merrion, County Dublin (est. 1969)
- O'Connell Secondary School – Dublin, County Dublin (est. 1828)
- Our Lady's Secondary School – Templemore, County Tipperary (est. 1985)
- Rice College – Ennis, County Clare (est. 1826)
- Rice College Westport – Westport, County Mayo
- Scoil Chiaráin CBS – Donnycarney, Dublin, County Dublin (est. 1950 as St Kieran's National School)
- St Aidan's CBS – Whitehall, Dublin, County Dublin (est. 1964)
- St. David's CBS – Artane, Dublin, County Dublin (est. 1966)
- St. Declan's College – Dublin, County Dublin (est. 1960)
- St. Fintan's High School – Sutton, Dublin, County Dublin (est. 1943)
- St. Joseph's CBS Nenagh – Nenagh, County Tipperary (est. 1862)
- St. Joseph's C.B.S. – Fairview, Dublin, County Dublin (est. 1888)
- St. Joseph's Secondary School – Drogheda, County Louth (est. 1858)
- St. Mary's Academy CBS – Carlow, County Carlow (est. 1864)
- St. Mary's CBS, Enniscorthy – Enniscorthy, County Wexford (est. 1999)
- St. Mary's CBS – Portlaoise, County Laois (est. 1847)
- St. Paul's CBS – Dublin, County Dublin (est. 1869)
- St. Mary's Diocesan School – Drogheda, County Louth (est. 1965 as St. Mary's CBS)
- St. Vincent's CBS – Glasnevin, Dublin, County Dublin (est. 1856)
- Synge Street CBS – Dublin, County Dublin (est. 1864)
- Waterpark College – Waterford, County Waterford (est. 1892)
- Woodbrook College – Bray, County Wicklow (est. 1956 as St. Brendan's College)

Former schools

- Artane Industrial School – Dublin, County Dublin (1870–1969)
- Carriglea Park Industrial School – Dún Laoghaire, County Dublin (1894–1954)
- CBS Eblana – Dún Laoghaire, County Dublin (1856–1992)
- CBS Enniscorthy – Enniscorthy, County Wexford (1857–1994; merged into St. Aidan's National School)
- CBS George's Street – Wexford, County Wexford (1853–1971)
- CBS Kilrush – Kilrush, County Clare (1874–1997)
- CBS Templemore – Templemore, County Tipperary (1932–1985; merged into Our Lady's Secondary School)
- C.B.S. Monasterevin (1869–1994)
- CBS Tramore – Tramore, County Waterford (closed 2014)
- CBS Youghal – Youghal, County Cork (1867–2005)
- Dingle CBS – Dingle, County Kerry (1846–2007)
- Roscrea CBS – Roscrea, County Tipperary (merged into Colaiste Phobal Ros Crea/Roscrea Community College)
- St Fintan's CBS – Doon, County Limerick (1891–2013)
- St. Joseph's CBS Gorey – Gorey, County Wexford (est. 1870–1990?)
- St Joseph's Industrial School – Glin, County Limerick (1872–1966)
- St Joseph's Industrial School – Letterfrack, County Galway (1887–1974)
- St Joseph's Industrial School – Tralee, County Kerry (1862–1970)
- St. Joseph's Private Preparatory School – Dublin, County Dublin (1965–1975)
- St. Patrick's College – Tuam, County Galway (1851–1990)

=== Italy ===
Former school

- Istituto Marcantonio Colonna – Rome, Lazio (est. 1901; closed 1997)

=== United Kingdom ===
==== England ====
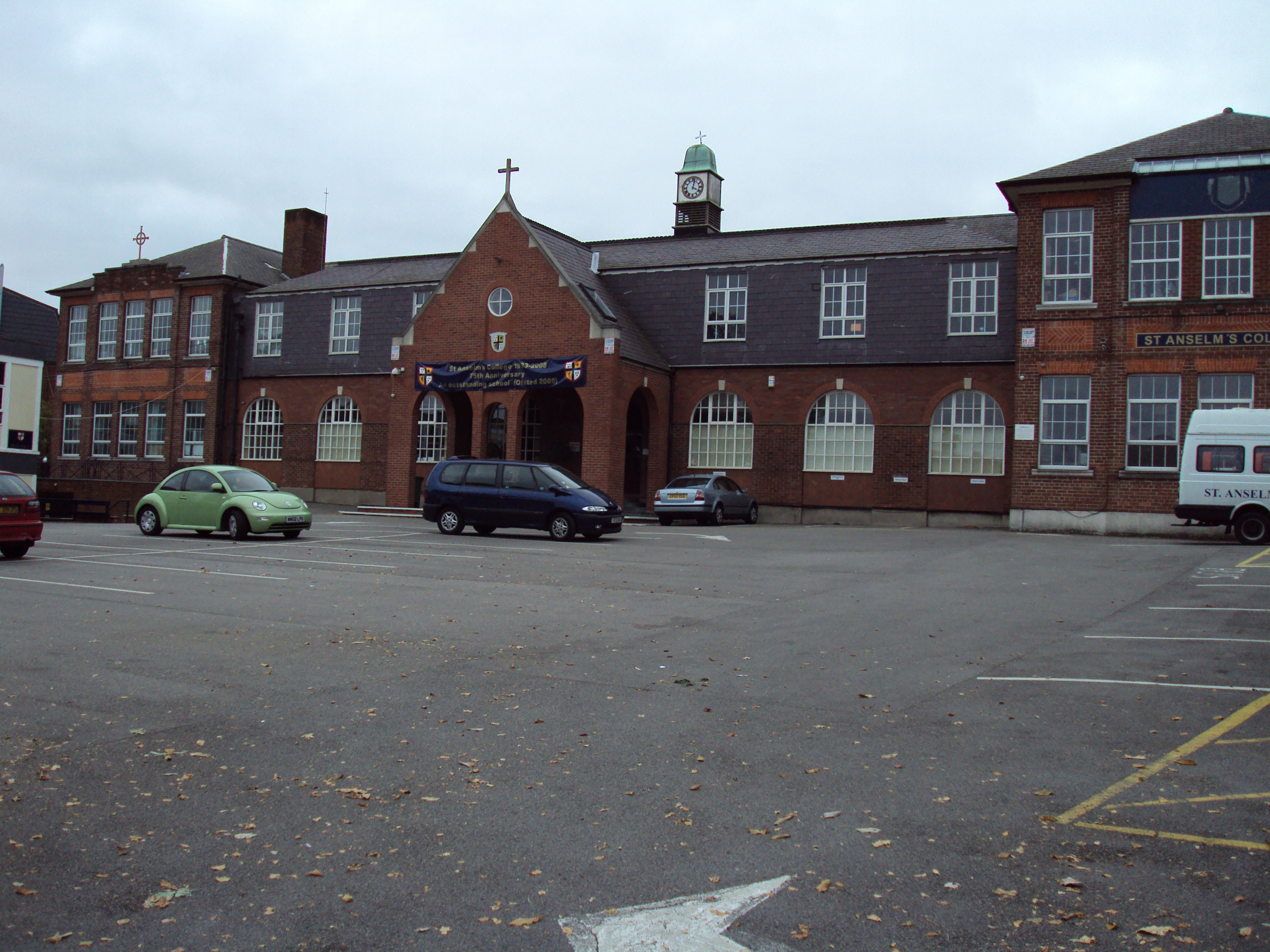
St Anselm's College in Birkenhead, Merseyside

- Redcourt St Anselm's – Prenton, Merseyside (est. 1947)
- St Aidan's Catholic Academy – Sunderland, Tyne and Wear (est. 1928 as St Mary's Grammar School)
- St Ambrose College – Hale Barns, Greater Manchester (est. 1946)
- St Anselm's College – Birkenhead, Merseyside (est. 1933)
- St. Boniface's Catholic College – Plymouth, Devon (est. 1863)
- St. Brendan's College – Brislington, Bristol
- St Edward's College – Liverpool, Merseyside (est. 1853 as the Catholic Institute)
- St Joseph's College – Stoke-on-Trent, Staffordshire (est. 1932)
- St. Joseph's Preparatory School, Stoke-on-Trent, Staffordshire
- St. Mary's College – Crosby, Merseyside (est. 1919)

Former school

- St. Joseph's College – Blackpool, Lancashire (1900–1975; merged into St. Mary's Catholic Academy) PRIOR PARK

==== Northern Ireland ====
- Abbey Christian Brothers' Grammar School – Newry, County Down (est. 1939)
- Christian Brothers Grammar School – Omagh, County Tyrone (est. 1861)
- Christian Brothers Primary School, Armagh – Armagh, County Armagh
- Christian Brothers School, Glen Road – Belfast, County Antrim (est. 1962)
- Edmund Rice College – Glengormley, County Antrim (est. 1903 as CBS Hardinge Street)
- Our Lady of Lourdes Primary School, Park Lodge – Belfast, County Antrim (est. 1958)
- St. Mary's Christian Brothers' Grammar School – Belfast, County Antrim (est. 1866 as CBS Divis Street)

Former schools

- Christian Brothers' Grammar School – Armagh, County Armagh (1851–1988; merged into St Patrick's Grammar School)
- Edmund Rice Primary School – Belfast, County Antrim (1967–2013; merged into St Patrick's Primary School)
- Gort na Móna Secondary School – Belfast, County Antrim (1971–1988; merged into Corpus Christi College)
- St. Aidan's Primary, Ballymurphy – Belfast, County Antrim (closed 1980s; merged into John Paul II Primary School)
- St Patrick's CBS, Donegall Street – Belfast, County Antrim (1866–1967; replaced by Edmund Rice Primary School)

==== Scotland ====
Former schools

- Scotus Academy – Edinburgh, Midlothian (1953–1978)
- St Ninian's Orphanage – Falkland, Fife (closed 1983)

== Oceania ==
=== Australia ===
==== Australian Capital Territory ====
- St Edmund's College, Canberra

==== New South Wales ====
- Aquinas College, Albury (now Xavier High School)
- Christian Brothers College, Albury (now Xavier High School)
- Christian Brothers School, Balmain (1887–1990)
- Christian Brothers College, Bondi Beach (closed)
- Christian Brothers' School, Broadway (1843–1847)
- Christian Brothers College, Burwood (1909–2009)
- Christian Brothers College, Manly (now St Paul's College, Manly)
- Christian Brothers' College, Newtown (1889–1970)
- Christian Brothers' Technical High School, Paddington (1903–1966)
- Christian Brothers College, Rose Bay (1935–1968)
- Christian Brothers' Rozelle (1892–1965)
- Christian Brothers' School, Macquarie St, Sydney (1843–1847)
- Christian Brothers College, Tamworth (now McCarthy Catholic College)
- Christian Brothers' High School, Lewisham (1891–present)
- Eddy's Annexe, Corrimal
- Edmund Rice College, West Wollongong
- Kildare Catholic College, Wagga Wagga (previously Christian Brothers High School)
- McCarthy Catholic College, Tamworth
- St Charles' School, Waverley (1892–1968)
- St Dominic's College, Obley Education Centre, Penrith
- St Edmund's School, Wahroonga (for visually impaired children)
- St Edward's College, East Gosford
- St Gabriel's School, Castle Hill, New South Wales (for hearing-impaired children)
- St Joseph's Primary School, Walgett
- St Mary's Cathedral College, Sydney (1911–present)
- St Michael's College, Wagga Wagga (now Kildare Catholic College)
- St Michael's Agricultural and Trade College, Inveralochy (Goulburn) (1954-1971)
- St Patrick's College, Goulburn (1874-2000) (now Trinity Catholic College)
- St Patrick's College, Strathfield (1928–present)
- St Patrick's College, Sutherland (1956–1993)
- St Patrick's Technical School, Goulburn (1938-1965)
- St Paul's Catholic College, Manly
- St Pius X College, Chatswood
- St Thomas's Christian Brothers' College, Lewisham (1889–1980)
- Trinity Catholic College, Goulburn (previously St Patrick's College)
- Waverley College, Waverley (1903–present)
- Xavier High School, Albury (previously Christian Brothers' College, Albury)

==== Queensland ====
- Ambrose Treacy College, Indooroopilly (formerly Nudgee Junior College)
- Aquinas College, Southport (formerly Christian Brothers' College, Southport)
- Assumption College, Warwick (formerly Christian Brothers' College, Warwick)
- Centre Education Program, Kingston
- Christian Brothers' College, Bundaberg (now Shalom Catholic College)
- Christian Brothers' College, Maryborough (now St Mary's College, Maryborough)
- Christian Brothers' College, Gympie (now St Patrick's College)
- Christian Brothers' College, Warwick (now Assumption College)
- Clairvaux MacKillop College, Brisbane
- Columba Catholic College, Charters Towers (formerly Mt Carmel College)
- Gilroy Santa Maria College, Ingham (composed of two former schools: Cardinal Gilroy College and Santa Maria College)
- Good Shepherd Catholic College, Mount Isa (composed of two former schools: Mount Isa Catholic High School and St Kieran's College)
- Ignatius Park College, Townsville
- Mount Carmel College, Charters Towers (now Columba Catholic College)
- Nudgee International College, Boondall
- Our Lady of the Southern Cross College, Dalby
- Shalom Catholic College, Bundaberg (formerly Christian Brothers' College, Bundaberg)
- St. Brendan's College, Yeppoon
- St Columban's College, Caboolture
- St Edmund's College, Ipswich
- St James' College, Brisbane
- St Joseph's College, Gregory Terrace, Brisbane
- St Joseph's Nudgee College, Brisbane
- Ambrose Treacy College, Indooroopilly
- St. Joseph's College, Toowoomba
- St Laurence's College, South Brisbane
- St. Mary's Catholic College, Dalby
- St Mary's College, Maryborough (formerly Christian Brothers' College, Maryborough)
- St. Mary's College, Toowoomba
- St Patrick's College, Mackay
- St Patrick's College, Gympie (formerly Christian Brothers' College, Gympie)
- St Patrick's College, Shorncliffe
- St. Teresa's College, Abergowrie
- The Cathedral College, Rockhampton (formerly Christian Brothers' College, Rockhampton)

==== South Australia ====
- Christian Brothers College, Adelaide
- Rostrevor College, Woodforde
- St Paul's College, Gilles Plains

==== Tasmania ====
- St Virgil's College, Hobart

==== Victoria ====
- Aquinas College, Melbourne
- Cathedral College, East Melbourne (closed 1995)
- Chanel College (Geelong) (closed 1999)
- Damascus College Ballarat (founded 1995 when St Paul's Technical College, Ballarat amalgamated with two other schools)
- Mount Carmel College, 196 Danks Street, Middle Park (closed)
- Parade College, Bundoora
- St Alipius Boys School, Ballarat East (closed 1976)
- St Augustine's Orphanage and School, Whittington, Geelong (joined with six other organisations in July 1997 to form MacKillop Family Services)
- St. Augustine's College, Yarraville (closed 1971)
- St. Bernard's College, Melbourne, Essendon
- St. Joseph's College, Geelong
- St Joseph's College, Melbourne (Pascoe Vale and North Melbourne) (closed 2010)
- St Joseph's Technical College, South Melbourne aka's Christian Brothers Technical School & St's Peter & Paul's Technical School, South Melbourne
- St. Kevin's College, Toorak
- St Leo's College, Box Hill (closed)
- St Mary's College, Melbourne
- St Patrick's College, Ballarat
- St Paul's Technical College, Ballarat (closed 1994, became Damascus College Ballarat)
- St Thomas College, Clifton Hill (closed)
- St Vincent's Orphanage and School, South Melbourne (joined with 6 other organisations in July 1997 to form MacKillop Family Services; the 1857 site continues as part of MacKillop)
- Therry College, Broadmeadows (closed 1994)
- St Mary's Technical School, Geelong (closed)
- St Joseph's Christian Brothers College, Warrnambool (closed 1991)

==== Western Australia ====
Current schools

- Aquinas College, Salter Point (established in 1938 when the headmaster, boarders and many day students from CBC Perth moved to the new campus at Salter Point)
- Christian Brothers College, Fremantle (established in 1901)
- Clontarf Aboriginal College, Waterford (established in 1901, formerly named St Joseph's Boys' Orphanage, Clontarf Boys' Orphanage, Clontarf Boys' Town and Clontarf School)
- Trinity College, East Perth (established in 1962 when the headmaster, staff and students from CBC Perth and students from St Patrick's Boys' School moved to the new campus at East Perth)

Former schools

- Bindoon Farm School, Bindoon (established in 1938, also known as St Joseph's Farm and Trade School and Bindoon Boys' Home, renamed Keaney College in 1966)
- Castledare Boys' Home, Wilson (1929–1983, also known as St Vincent's Boys' Home)
- Catholic Agricultural College, Bindoon (formerly named Keaney College, renamed Edmund Rice College in 2018)
- Christian Brothers Agricultural School, Tardun (1928–2009, formerly known as St Mary's Agricultural School and Tardun Farm School)
- Christian Brothers College, Albany (a predecessor of St Joseph's College)
- Christian Brothers College, Highgate (established in 1979 from a merger of CBHS Highgate and CBHS Bedford, renamed St Marks College in 1982)
- Christian Brothers College, Kalgoorlie (established in 1906, joined with Prendiville College to become the co-educational John Paul College in 1984)
- Christian Brothers College, Leederville (established in 1942, joined with St Mary's College for Girls to become the co-educational Aranmore Catholic College in 1986)
- Christian Brothers College, Perth (established in 1894, closed when headmaster, staff and students moved to the new Trinity College campus in 1962)
- Christian Brothers High School, Bedford (established in 1959, merged with CBHS Highgate to become CBC Highgate in 1979)
- Christian Brothers High School, Highgate (established in 1936, merged with CBHS Bedford to become CBC Highgate in 1979)
- Edmund Rice College, Bindoon (established in 1938, formerly named Bindoon Farm School, Keaney College and Catholic Agricultural College. Closed in 2024.)
- Keaney College, Bindoon (formerly named Bindoon Farm School, renamed Catholic Agricultural College in 1995)
- Nulungu College, Broome (established in 1971, merged with Nulungu Girls College in 1980, joined with St Mary's Primary School to become St Mary's College Broome in 1995)
- St Edmund's College, Collie (established in 1955, joined with St Brigid's School to become the co-educational Collie Catholic College in 1994)
- St Francis Xavier College, East Victoria Park (established in 1953, joined with Our Lady Help of Christians School and St Joachim's School to become the co-educational Ursula Frayne Catholic College in 1990)
- St Mark's College, Highgate (formerly named CBC Highgate, joined with St Thomas Aquinas College to become the co-educational Chisholm Catholic College in 1989)
- St Patrick's Boys' School, Perth (1878–1963)
- St Patrick's College, Geraldton (established in 1925, joined with Stella Maris College to become the co-educational Nagle Catholic College in 1994)

=== Cook Islands ===
- Nukutere College – Avarua, Rarotonga (est. 1975; Christian Brothers withdrew in 2009)

=== New Zealand ===
- John Paul College – Rotorua, Bay of Plenty (est. 1987; Christian Brothers withdrew in the 1990s)
- Liston College – Auckland, Auckland (est. 1974; Christian Brothers withdrew in 1988)
- St Kevin's College – Oamaru, Otago (est. 1927; Christian Brothers withdrew in 1996)
- St Peter's College – Auckland, Auckland (est. 1939; Christian Brothers withdrew in 2007)
- St Thomas of Canterbury College – Christchurch, Canterbury (est. 1961)
- Trinity Catholic College, Dunedin, Otago (est. 1989)

Former schools

- Christian Brothers High School – Dunedin, Otago (1876–1964; replaced by St Paul's High School)
- Christian Brothers Junior School – Dunedin, Otago (1964–1989; merged into Trinity Catholic College)
- Edmund Rice College – Rotorua, Bay of Plenty (1963–1987; merged into John Paul College)
- St Edmund's School – Dunedin, Otago (1949–1989; merged into Trinity Catholic College)
- St Patrick's Primary School – Oamaru, Otago (1928–1973)
- St Paul's High School – Dunedin, Otago (1964–1989; merged into Trinity Catholic College)

=== Papua New Guinea ===
- Fatima College – Banz, Western Highlands Province
- St Francis Xavier Post Primary School – Bundralis, Manus Province
