= Christian Brothers College =

Christian Brothers College may refer to:

== Africa ==
- Christian Brothers College, Bulawayo, Zimbabwe
- Christian Brothers' College, Mount Edmund, in Pretoria, South Africa

== Australia ==
- Christian Brothers College, Adelaide, South Australia
- Christian Brothers College, Burwood, in Sydney, New South Wales, Australia
- Christian Brothers College, Fremantle, in Perth, Western Australia
- Christian Brothers' College, Maryborough, Queensland, Australia
- Christian Brothers' College, Perth, Western Australia
- Christian Brothers College, Rose Bay, New South Wales, Australia
- Christian Brothers College, St Kilda, Victoria, Australia

== Ireland ==
- Christian Brothers College Charleville, County Cork, Ireland
- Christian Brothers College, Cork, Ireland
- Christian Brothers College, Monkstown Park, in Dún Laoghaire, County Cork, Ireland

== U.S. ==
- Christian Brothers College High School, in St. Louis, Missouri
- Christian Brothers College High School, former name of Christian Brothers High School in Memphis, Tennessee
- Christian Brothers College, former name of Christian Brothers University, in Memphis, Tennessee
- Christian Brothers College, predecessor of Christian Brothers University in Pass Christian, Mississippi

== See also ==
- Christian Brothers Academy (disambiguation)
- List of Christian Brothers schools
