= Christian Brothers High School =

Christian Brothers High School may refer to schools under the auspices of both the Congregation of Christian Brothers and the De La Salle Brothers, using the name Christian Brothers.

== Australia ==
- Christian Brothers School, Balmain, New South Wales
- Christian Brothers College, Burwood, New South Wales
- Christian Brothers' High School, Lewisham, New South Wales
- Christian Brothers College, Rose Bay, New South Wales
- Christian Brothers College, Adelaide, South Australia
- Christian Brothers' College, Perth, Western Australia
- Christian Brothers College, St Kilda, Victoria

== United States ==
- Christian Brothers High School (Sacramento, California)
- Christian Brothers College High School, St. Louis, Missouri
- Christian Brothers Academy (New Jersey), Lincroft
- Christian Brothers Academy (Albany, New York)
- Christian Brothers Academy (DeWitt, New York)
- Christian Brothers High School (Memphis, Tennessee)
- Quincy Notre Dame High School, in Quincy, Illinois, a.k.a. Christian Brothers High School

== Elsewhere ==
- Christian Brothers College, Cork, Ireland
- Christian Brothers' School, Glen Road, Belfast, Northern Ireland
- Christian Brothers Grammar School, Omagh, Northern Ireland
- Christian Brothers' College, Mount Edmund, Pretoria, South Africa
- Christian Brothers College, Bulawayo, Zimbabwe
- Christian Brothers High School or Kavanagh College, Dunedin, New Zealand

== See also ==
- List of Christian Brothers schools
- Christian Brothers (disambiguation)
