= List of boys' schools in Australia =

List of boys schools in Australia

Here is a list of boy's schools in Australia.

== Australian Capital Territory ==
- Marist College Canberra, Pearce
- St Edmund's College, Griffith

== New South Wales ==
- Ashfield Boys High School, Ashfield
- Asquith Boys High School, Asquith
- Balgowlah Boys Campus, Balgowlah
- Canterbury Boys' High School, Canterbury
- Christian Brothers' High School, Lewisham
- Coogee Boys' Preparatory School, Randwick
- Cranbrook School, Bellevue Hill/Rose Bay
- De La Salle College, Caringbah
- De La Salle College, Revesby Heights
- East Hills Boys High School, Panania
- Edmund Rice College, West Wollongong
- Epping Boys High School, Marsfield
- Farrer Memorial Agricultural High School, Calala
- Hartford College, Daceyville
- Holy Cross College, Ryde
- Homebush Boys High School, Homebush
- James Cook Boys Technology High School, Kogarah
- The King's School, North Parramatta
- Knox Grammar School, Wahroonga
- Liverpool Boys High School, Liverpool
- Marcellin College Randwick, Randwick
- Marist College Eastwood, Eastwood
- Mosman Preparatory School, Mosman/Terrey Hills
- Normanhurst Boys' High School, Normanhurst
- North Sydney Boys High School, Crows Nest
- Parramatta Marist High School, Westmead
- Patrician Brothers' College, Fairfield, New South Wales
- Punchbowl Boys High School, Punchbowl
- Redfield College, Dural
- St Aloysius' College, Kirribilli
- St Augustine's College, Brookvale
- St Dominic's College, Kingswood
- St Edward's College, East Gosford
- St Gregory's College, Gregory Hills
- St Ignatius' College Riverview, Riverview
- St Joseph's College, Hunters Hill
- St Patrick's College, Strathfield
- St Paul's College, Manly
- St Pauls Catholic College, Greystanes
- St Pius X College, Chatswood
- St Stanislaus' College, Bathurst
- Scots College, Bellevue Hill
- Sydney Boys High School, Moore Park
- Sydney Church of England Grammar School, North Sydney
- Sydney Grammar School, Darlinghurst/Edgecliff/St Ives
- Trinity Grammar School, Summer Hill/Strathfield
- Waverley College, Waverley
- Wollemi College, Werrington

Bexley

- Marist College Kogarah
- Sydney Technical High School

Blacktown

- Blacktown Boys High School
- Patrician Brothers' College

Stanmore

- Newington College
- Wyvern House

== Queensland ==
- Ambrose Treacy College, Indooroopilly
- Anglican Church Grammar School, East Brisbane
- Brisbane Boys' College, Toowong
- Brisbane Grammar School, Spring Hill
- Ignatius Park College, Townsville
- Iona College, Wynnum West
- Ipswich Grammar School, Ipswich
- Marist College Ashgrove, Ashgrove
- Moreton Bay Boys' College, Manly West
- Padua College, Kedron
- St Augustine's College, Parramatta Park
- St. Brendan's College, Yeppoon
- St Edmund's College, Woodend
- St Joseph's College, Gregory Terrace, Spring Hill
- St Joseph's Nudgee College, Boondall
- St Laurence's College, South Brisbane
- St Mary's College, Toowoomba
- St Patrick's College, Shorncliffe
- St Teresa's College, Abergowrie
- The Southport School, Southport
- Toowoomba Grammar School, East Toowoomba
- Villanova College, Coorparoo

== South Australia ==
- Blackfriars Priory School, Prospect
- Christian Brothers' College, Adelaide
- Prince Alfred College, Kent Town
- Rostrevor College, Woodforde
- St Peter's College, Hackney

== Tasmania ==
- The Hutchins School, Hobart
- St. Virgil's College, Austins Ferry/Hobart

== Victoria ==
- Berwick Grammar School, Officer
- Brighton Grammar School, Brighton
- Camberwell Grammar School, Canterbury
- De La Salle College, Malvern
- Lysterfield Lake College, Narre Warren North
- Marcellin College, Bulleen
- Mazenod College, Mulgrave
- Melbourne Grammar School, Caulfield/South Yarra
- Melbourne High School, South Yarra
- Parade College, Bundoora/Preston
- St Bede's College, Bentleigh East
- St Bede's College, Mentone
- St Bernard's College, Essendon West
- St Joseph's College, Ferntree Gully
- St Joseph's College, Newtown
- St Kevin's College, Toorak
- St Patrick's College, Ballarat
- Salesian College, Chadstone
- Scotch College, Hawthorn
- Simonds Catholic College, West Melbourne
- Whitefriars College, Donvale
- Yeshivah College, St Kilda East
- Yesodei HaTorah College, Elwood

Kew

- Trinity Grammar School
- Xavier College

== Western Australia ==
- Aquinas College, Salter Point
- Christ Church Grammar School, Claremont
- Christian Brothers College, Fremantle
- Hale School, Wembley Downs
- Mazenod College, Lesmurdie
- Scotch College, Swanbourne
- Trinity College, East Perth
- Wesley College, South Perth

== Former Boys Schools ==
Australian Capital Territory

- Canberra Grammar School, Red Hill became coeducational in 2016.
- Daramalan College, Dickson became coeducational in 1977.

New South Wales

- Albury Grammar School, Albury merged with the Woodstock Presbyterian Girls School to become the Scots School Albury in 1972.
- All Saints' College, Bathurst merged with The Scots School to form Scots All Saints' College in 2018.
- The Armidale School, Armidale became coeducational in 2015.
- Barker College, Hornsby became coeducational in 2016.
- Blue Mountains Grammar School, Wentworth Falls became coeducational.
- Camden College, Newtown (1864–1877)
- Christian Brothers College, Burwood (1909–2009)
- Christian Brothers College, Rose Bay (1935–1966)
- Christian Brothers School, Balmain (1887–1990)
- Cooerwull Academy, Bowenfels (1992–1914)
- Corpus Christi College, Maroubra became coeducational in 2023.
- Crows Nest Boys High School, Crows Nest (1883–1992)
- De La Salle College, Ashfield merged with Bethlehem College, Ashfield and St Vincent's Primary School to become St Vincent's College in 2023.
- De La Salle College, Cronulla became coeducational in 1975 and was renamed to St Aloysius College in 2024.
- Drummoyne Boys' High School, Drummoyne (1940–1990)
- High School, Goulburn, Goulburn (1869–1874)
- Highfield College, Turramurra (1907–1915)
- Homebush Grammar School, Strathfield (1892–1914)
- LaSalle Catholic College, Bankstown became coeducational in 2016.
- Macquarie Boys Technology High School, Parramatta (1957–2010)
- Marist Catholic College North Shore, North Sydney became coeducational in 2021.
- Marist Catholic College Penshurst, Penshurst became coeducational in 2015.
- Mowbray House, Chatswood (1906–1954)
- Oakhill College, Castle Hill became coeducational in 1976.
- Randwick Boys High School, Randwick merged with Randwick Girls' High School to become Randwick High School in 2025.
- The Scots School, Bathurst became coeducational in 1997 and then merged with All Saints College to form Scots All Saints' College in 2019.
- The School, Mount Victoria, Mount Victoria (1885–1916)
- St Andrew's Cathedral School, Sydney became coeducational in 1999.
- St Leo's Catholic College, Wahroonga became coeducational in 1983.
- St Mary's Cathedral College, Sydney became coeducational in 2025.
- William Cowper Anglican School, Tamworth merged into Calrossy Anglican School in 2006.
- Wolaroi College, Orange merged with Presbyterian Ladies' College to become the Kinross Wolaroi School in 1975.

Queensland

- All Souls School, Charters Towers merged with St Gabriel's School to become All Souls St Gabriel's School.
- Scots College, Warwick merged with the Presbyterian Girls' College to become Scots PGC College in 1970.
- Slade School, Warwick (closed)
- St Barnabas School, Ravenshoe (closed)
- St Columban's College, Caboolture became coeducational in 1995.
- St James College, Spring Hill became coeducational in 1994.
- Thornburgh College, Charters Towers merged with Blackheath College to become Blackheath and Thornburgh College.

South Australia

- Adelaide Educational Institution, Adelaide (1852–1880)
- The King's College, Kensington Park merged with the Girton Girls' School to become the Pembroke School in 1974.
- Scotch College, Torrens Park became coeducational in 1972.
- St Ignatius College, Adelaide became coeducational in 1971.
- St Michael's College, Beverley is now coeducational.
- St Paul's College, Gilles Plains became coeducational in 2022.
- Westminster School, Marion became coeducational in 1978.

Tasmania

- Launceston Grammar School, Launceston merged with the Broadland House Girls' Grammar School to become the coed Launceston Church Grammar School in 1936.
- New Town High School, New Town merged with Ogilvie High School to become Hobart City High School in 2022.

Victoria

- Assumption College, Kilmore became coeducational in 1971.
- Ballarat College, Ballarat merged with Clarendon College to become Ballarat Clarendon College.
- Carey Baptist Grammar School, Kew became coeducational in 1979.
- Caulfield Grammar School, Melbourne became coeducational in 1981.
- Christian Brothers College, St Kilda East merged with Presentation College to become St Mary's College in 2021.
- Essendon Grammar School, Essendon merged with Penleigh Presbyterian Ladies' College to become Penleigh and Essendon Grammar School in 1977.
- Geelong Grammar School, Corio became coeducational in 1972.
- Hamilton College, Hamilton merged with Alexandra College to become The Hamilton and Alexandra College in 1962.
- Ivanhoe Grammar School, Ivanhoe became coeducational in 2003.
- Peninsula Grammar, Mount Eliza became coeducational in 1994.
- St Joseph's College, Melbourne (1903–2010)
- St Patrick's College, Melbourne (1854–1968)
- St Paul's College, Ballarat (1948–1994)
- Samaritan Catholic College, Preston (2000–2009)
- Southwood Boys' Grammar School, Ringwood (1999–2013)
- Wesley College, Melbourne became coeducational in 1978.
- Yarra Valley Grammar, Ringwood became coeducational in 1978.

Western Australia

- Christian Brothers College, St Georges Terrace (1894–1962)
- Clontarf Aboriginal College, Waterford became coeducational.
- Guildford Grammar School, Guildford became coeducational in 2019.
- St Louis School, Claremont merged with Loreto Convent, Claremont to become John XXIII College, Perth in 1977.

== See also ==
- Lists of boys' schools
- Lists of girls' schools
- List of girls' schools in Australia
