= St Joseph's Industrial School =

St Joseph's Industrial School may refer to:

- St Joseph's Industrial School, Clonmel, South Tipperary, Ireland
- St Joseph's Industrial School, Dundalk, County Louth, Ireland
- St Joseph's Industrial School, Letterfrack, County Galway, Ireland
- St Joseph's Industrial School, Salthill, County Galway, Ireland
- St Joseph's Industrial School, Tralee, County Kerry, Ireland
- St Joseph's Industrial School, Glin, County Limerick, Ireland
- St. Joseph's Industrial School, 1896–1972, Clayton, Kent County, Delaware, U.S.
- St. Joseph's Industrial School, 1897–1917, Notre Dame, Indiana, U.S.
