= CBA =

CBA may refer to:

== Maths and science ==
- Casei Bifidus Acidophilus, a bacterium
- Colicin, activity protein
- Complete Boolean algebra, a concept from mathematics
- Cytometric Bead Array, a bead-based immunoassay
- Cell Based Assay, also a kind of immunoassay
- 4-Carboxybenzaldehyde, a byproduct in the industrial production of terephthalic acid
- Congenital bronchial atresia, a rare congenital abnormality

== Organizations ==
=== Academic ===
- Catholic Biblical Association
- Center for Bits and Atoms, a research institution at the Massachusetts Institute of Technology, United States
- Christian Brothers Academy, schools run by the Institute of the Brothers of the Christian Schools, including:
  - Christian Brothers Academy (New Jersey), in Lincroft, New Jersey
  - Christian Brothers Academy (Albany, New York)
  - Christian Brothers Academy (Syracuse, New York)
- College of Business Administration (Saudi Arabia), private college in Saudi Arabia
- Corby Business Academy, in Corby, England

=== Banks ===
- Central Bank of Armenia
- Centrale Bank van Aruba, the central bank of Aruba
- Commercial Bank of Africa, headquartered in Nairobi, Kenya
- Commercial Bank of Australia (1866–1982), merged into the Wales bank to form Westpac
- Commonwealth Bank of Australia

=== Professional and interest ===
- California Bluegrass Association
- Cambridge Buddhist Association
- Canadian Bankers Association
- Canadian Bar Association
- CBA (Christian trade association), established in 1950 by bookstores
- Chicago Bar Association
- Chinese Benevolent Association
  - Chinese Benevolent Association of Vancouver
- Commonwealth Broadcasting Association, Commonwealth of Nations
- Consumer Bankers Association, lobbying voice on retail banking issues in the United States
- Council for British Archaeology

=== Sports ===
- California Basketball Association, the original name the West Coast Conference
- Chinese Badminton Association
- Chinese Baseball Association
- Chinese Basketball Alliance, a professional men's league (1994 to 1999) in Taiwan
- Chinese Basketball Association, the pre-eminent professional men's basketball league in China
- Chinese Basketball Association (organisation), the national basketball association of China
- Continental Basketball Association, a defunct professional men's basketball minor league in the United States
- Continental Basketball Association (1969–1974), defunct semi-pro basketball league in the United States
- Continental Basketball Association, a defunct semi-professional men's league, renamed Australian Basketball Association in 1999

=== Other organizations ===
- CBA (food retail), a Hungarian food-retail network
- Companhia Brasileira de Aluminio, the largest aluminium producer in Brazil
- CBA (AM), former CBC Radio One AM station in Moncton, New Brunswick, now known as CBAM-FM
- CBA-FM, the CBC Radio Two station in Moncton
- Central Anticorruption Bureau of Poland
- Luis A. Ferré Performing Arts Center (Centro de Bellas Artes Luis A. Ferre), a multi-use performance centre in San Juan, Puerto Rico
- Círculo de Bellas Artes, a private, non-profit, cultural organization in Madrid, Spain
- Brilliance China Automotive Holding Limited, a subsidiary of the Chinese Brilliance Auto Group, formerly listed with NYSE ticker symbol: CBA

== Other uses ==
- Celia Barquín Arozamena (1996–2018), Spanish amateur golfer
- Chromatic button accordion
- Collective bargaining agreement, a labor contract agreed upon between management and trade unions used in many businesses, including sports leagues such as:
  - MLB Collective Bargaining Agreement, in baseball
  - NBA Collective Bargaining Agreement, in basketball
  - NFL Collective Bargaining Agreement, in American football
  - NHL Collective Bargaining Agreement, in ice hockey
  - MLS Collective Bargaining Agreement, in soccer
- Community Benefits Agreement
- Computed Buffer Adjustment, a golf scoring adjustment for handicapping purposes
- Consensus-based assessment
- Córdoba, Argentina, a city
- Corpus-based approaches in linguistics research
- Cost–benefit analysis
