= Christian Brothers =

Christian Brothers may refer to:

== Arts and entertainment ==
- Christian Brothers (film), a 2011 Malayalam-language thriller film
- The Christian Brothers, a 1975 play by Australian writer Ron Blair
- "Christian Brothers", a song by Elliott Smith from his 1995 album Elliott Smith

== Religious orders ==
- Congregation of Christian Brothers or Irish Christian Brothers, a Catholic lay order founded in Ireland in 1802
- De La Salle Brothers or French Christian Brothers, a Catholic lay order founded in France in 1680

== Schools ==
- Christian Brothers Academy (disambiguation)
- Christian Brothers College (disambiguation)
- Christian Brothers High School (disambiguation)

== Other ==
- Christian Brothers, a brand of California brandy owned by Heaven Hill Distillery, Inc.

== See also ==
- Lasallian educational institutions, often referred to as Christian Brother schools
