= CBHS =

CBHS may refer to:

- Canterbury Boys' High School, Australia
- Christian Brothers High School (disambiguation), many schools in various locations
- Christchurch Boys' High School, New Zealand
- Christies Beach High School, Australia
- Cocoa Beach High School, Florida
- Cypress Bay High School, Florida
- Cut Bank High School, Montana
