= Kevin Sharkey =

Irish artist and political activist

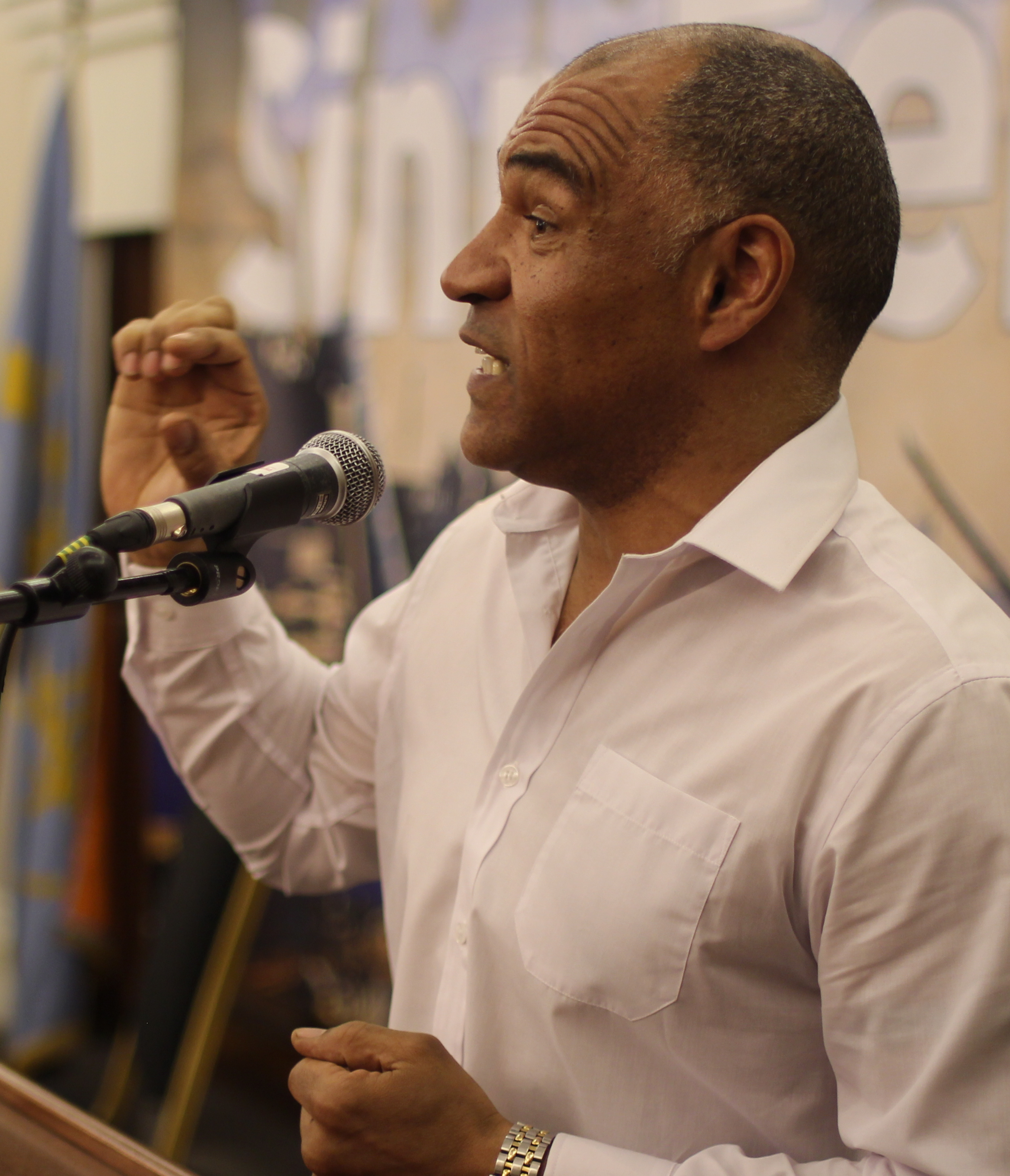
- Sharkey in April 2014
- Born: 3 June 1961 (age 65); Dublin, Ireland
- Website: kevinsharkeyart.com

Kevin Sharkey (born 3 June 1961) is an Irish artist, political activist, and former television presenter and actor. He sought a nomination to run in the 2018 Irish presidential election, but withdrew his bid on 17 September 2018.

== Early life ==
Sharkey was born in St Patrick's Mother and Baby Home in Dublin on 3 June 1961, the son of an Irish mother and a Nigerian father who was a student at the Royal College of Surgeons in Ireland at the time. He was given up for adoption and raised by the Sharkey family in Killybegs, County Donegal. As a child, he took part in Irish dancing, in which he won 37 medals before the age of 12. He was also a runner-up in the all Ireland Disco dancing championship at Zhivago nightclub at the age of 16.

Sharkey says his relationship with his adoptive parents was sometimes abusive, eventually resulting in him being put into foster care when aged 12. He was sent to live at St Joseph's Industrial School in Salthill in Galway, where he witnessed sexual abuse against young pupils by Christian Brothers staff, and left at the age of 16. He also suffered physical abuse; the school was the subject of a police investigation and a national scandal in 1996. However, it was during his stay there that he discovered his passion for painting, which he said provided him with a sense of escapism. His art career began at the age of 30, when he experimented with oils on canvas and bright colours.

== Career ==
=== Early career ===
Sharkey has had many different career paths, including being a chef, a fisherman, a singer-songwriter, and a TV presenter. He was Ireland's first ever bi-racial television presenter on a show called Megamix, and presented British television music show The Roxy from 1987. He was also briefly a photographer and a model, photographed by David Bailey.

Sharkey regularly collaborated with Irish rock band, The Boomtown Rats, and German disco group Boney M., writing lyrics and melodies for both. He wrote the latter group's 1989 single Everybody Wants to Dance Like Josephine Baker.

Sharkey had a small part in Father Ted, playing a priest named Father Shaft in two episodes. His most famous line came after a nun, seeing his dark complexion, asked him what he thought of all the work being done in Africa by priests; he replied in his thick Irish accent, "Sure I wouldn't know, I'm from Donegal." He was also a farmhand in the Irish TV series Celebrity Farm where he was the fourth farmhand to be evicted. Sharkey's difficult relationship with the other celebrity contestants was the subject of news media attention. He refused to join cast members on a reunion show on RTÉ One's The Late Late Show, choosing to appear on the rival network, TV3's The Dunphy Show instead.

Irish singer and songwriter Bob Geldof was the first person to buy a Sharkey painting, with other collectors of his work including Charles Saatchi, Rosie Huntington Whitley, Michael Portillo, Courtney Love, Whitney Houston, Matt Lucas, and the President of Ireland Michael D. Higgins.

=== Art ===
Sharkey has been a full-time artist since 1992. He was described by Ireland's Sunday Independent as "A True Irish Legend" and by Sky News as "Pure Genius", he and his provocative canvas painting "You May Now Kiss the Groom", was also listed on CNN's "Monday's Intriguing people" in 2010 for its proposition of Gay Marriage. His art is considered abstract, modern work, with bright, textured colours. His style is also regarded as stylistically diverse with many of his works being visually different from each other.

He has had exhibitions in Dublin, London, Ibiza, Amsterdam and New York City. In 2007 his What Colour Are Kisses? exhibition sold out completely within 48 hours. He has had gallery shows solely dedicated to his work in Dublin, Donegal, Mayo, Boyle, Ibiza and London's Mayfair. His painting Roisin raised €26,100 in 2008 for People in Need in the RTÉ Telethon. His work has included, Samantha Mumba's bust and 'Moolah' (a life sized cow covered in €18,000 of real banknotes – during the height of Ireland's Celtic Tiger phenomenon). Sharkey paintings were also included in the music video of Estelle and Kanye West's 2008 hit single, American Boy.

His Public Enemy Number One exhibition was on a twelve date tour of the world (including New York, Tokyo, Rome and Rio de Janeiro). The public figures featured in the exhibition included Jordan as Myra Hindley, Barack Obama wearing Ku Klux Klan robes (made from U.S. flags), the Pope marrying a gay couple, and Angelina Jolie & Madonna passing each other in a supermarket aisle pushing trolleys full of multi-racial children.

In 2013, Sharkey filed a lawsuit against Octagon Films and Irish broadcast network RTÉ for unauthorized use of his artwork in Irish crime series "Love/Hate". He also filed for damages over the portrayal of his work being "liked by a dangerous killer and drug addict". The case was eventually settled out of court in late 2014.

In August 2016, Sharkey was arrested in Dublin over alleged art theft. He denied these allegations as the purportedly stolen paintings were his. He told police that he had destroyed the paintings in 2014 because they "were inferior works of art". Claiming he set them on fire in an alleyway as "they just weren't very good and I didn't want them showing up at auction". In October, he was ordered by a Circuit Civil Court to pay €5,000 in damages and legal fees of another €10,000 over highly defamatory Twitter comments.

== Political activities ==
In late 2005, Sharkey announced his intention to take the Irish State to the European Court of Human Rights in order to force the recognition of same-sex partnerships, specifically civil partnerships. He cited personal reasons for this, decrying the fact that if he were to marry his long-term male partner Ade Antigha in Spain, where the two were living at the time, the marriage would not be recognised by Irish law. Ireland subsequently legalised civil partnerships (in 2011) and same-sex marriage (in 2015).

In September 2013, Sharkey joined Sinn Féin. He cited the "dedication" of its then deputy leader, Mary Lou McDonald TD as his reason for doing so. Sharkey however left the party in 2016 because he felt he was just being used as a "poster boy".

In May 2016, Sharkey voiced his opposition to Irish government spending on foreign aid, as well as the influx of immigration in Ireland.

In March 2017, Sharkey denounced the Catholic Church's role in the Tuam foster home scandal, invoking his own negative experience of the Irish foster care system at the time, mentioning sexual abuse and the existence of unmarked graves of young boarders who had died at his school in Salthill, Galway.

In the same month, Sharkey announced his opposition to current Irish immigration policy and the contentious atmosphere surrounding debate of the issue, declaring he intended to enter politics in order to open up dialogue. In the months since he made several appearances on Irish television and radio speaking out against political correctness and the perceived prioritization of immigrant citizens over native born Irish citizens when it came to public services.

In March 2018, Sharkey announced his candidacy for the 2018 Irish presidential election, on an "Ireland First" platform. He later withdrew from the race, calling it a "circus".

Sharkey supports the death penalty, saying he believes the death penalty would be an appropriate punishment for those who harm elderly people.

== Personal life ==
Sharkey is bisexual. He became engaged to his girlfriend, Italian art dealer Carmen Sant Angelo, in 2010.

In 2016, while struggling with his finances, Sharkey briefly became homeless while living in Dublin.
