= Ardscoil Na Mara =

Location
- Ardscoil na Mara, Summerhill, Ballycarnane, Tramore; Tramore, Waterford, Munster; Ireland

Information
- Motto: Every student, Every Class, Every day
- Established: 2014
- Principal: Aoife Denton
- Website: ardscoilnamara.ie

Principal's welcome

Ardscoil Na Mara is a secondary school located in Tramore, County Waterford. It is a member of the Edmund Rice School's Trust (ERST). The school was established in 2014 following the amalgamation of the Stella Maris, Tramore and C.B.S. Tramore. As of May 2022, it has 1,186 pupils. The school offers multiple extracurricular activities, for example, sports, a sustainability committee, etc. The school has a café. The school is a Catholic faith school, and as such, has prayer services quite often.
