= St. Mary's Orphanage & Day School, Kolkata =

St. Mary's Orphanage & Day School

Location
- 103, Dum Dum Road, Kolkata,West Bengal, India. Kolkata, West Bengal, 700030; India
- 22.6215°N 88.3944°E

Information
- Type: Private
- Motto: Vince Te Ipsum (Conquer Yourself)
- Religious affiliation: Roman Catholic Christian
- Established: 1848; 178 years ago
- Founder: Edmund Rice
- School board: ICSE
- Oversight: Congregation of Christian Brothers in India (CCBI)
- Session: April to March
- Principal: Br Ruvan Rebello
- Gender: Boys till Class 10. NIOS and +2 are co-ed
- Classes: KG to Class 12
- Average class size: 45
- Language: English
- Hours in school day: 6
- Campuses: 1 (Dum Dum Junction)
- Campus type: Urban
- Houses: 5 (Red, blue, green, yellow and white
- Colours: Blue and gold
- Affiliations: Council of Indian School Certificate Examinations (C.I.S.C.E.)
- Website: www.smods.in

In 1848, the Congregation of Christian Brothers (Missionaries of Ireland) founded the Calcutta Male Orphanage at Murgihatta, Calcutta. In 1947, it came to the present campus in Dum Dum in North Calcutta and was renamed St. Mary's Orphanage and Day School. The school particularly serves the northern and eastern part of Calcutta and North 24 Parganas District. It organizes a daily feeding program which serves more than 100 people everyday.

== Campus ==
As the school was also a residential school for orphans and the underprivileged till 2006, it also has dormitories, a dining hall and a kitchen, along with servants quarters and the three main school buildings. However, the boarding closed down in 2006 and the school is now run as a day school only.

== Education ==
St. Mary's provides education under the ICSE/ISC board, New Delhi. It is run by the Congregation of Christian Brothers of Ireland. Nursery section and +2 level i.e. Class XI and XII has been introduced. The school introduced science as well as humanities sections in the higher secondary level from 2021. From the 2012 session admission of girls to the +2 level has started, breaking the school's long-standing reputation of being a premier Boys' only school, in Calcutta.

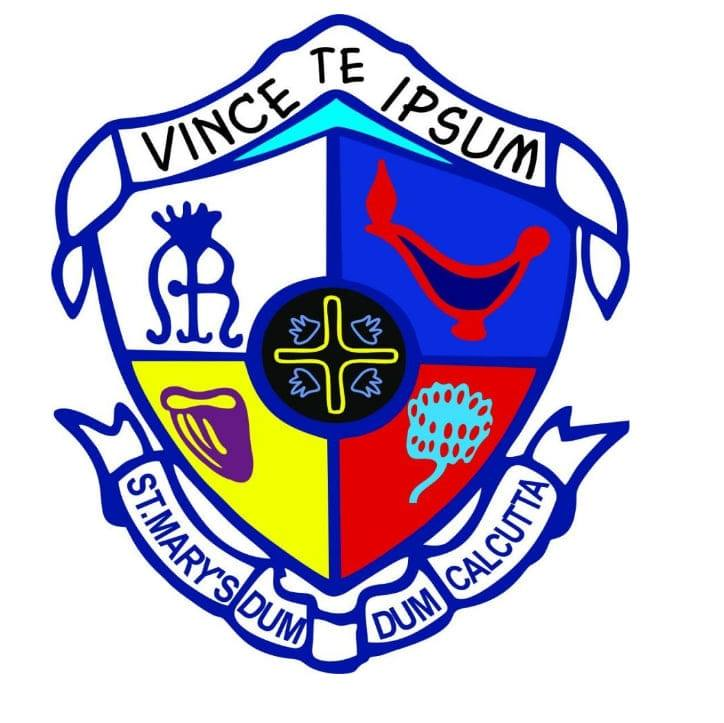
The Official Emblem of S.M.O.

However, in a kind of way the school had become co-ed much earlier, as the open school under the NIOS which is personally supervised by the Brothers had been co-ed since inception. The open school drives literacy among the poor and underprivileged. St. Mary's provides +2 education under NIOS. Secondary education under NIOS is provided by its sister school St. George's in Bowbazar (Central Calcutta).

Up to the 1990s, the Brothers used to oversee the running of the school, and also used to take classes. They could be seen roaming the long aisles and corridors of the school in their white cassocks. However, post the 1990s, the school started appointing specialist educationists as the Principal or Headmistress (Starting with Ms. Paula Ghosh), and the running of the day school was handed over to them, while the Brothers took a backseat and focused primarily on overall administration of the school and social upliftment of the underprivileged, apart from running the NIOS section of the school. The school has had two Headmistresses in the past in Ms. Paula Ghosh and Ms. Dorothy Noronha and the day school is now being administered by the Principal, Mrs. Nandita Bhattacharyya.

St. Mary's Orphanage & Day School has also produced many notable alumni, including ace shooter Joydeep Karmakar, who finished fourth in the 50m prone rifle event at the London Olympics of 2012.

== See also ==
- Education in India
- List of schools in India
- Education in West Bengal
