= The Roxy (TV series) =

- Presented by: David Jensen (episodes 1-29 & 43); Kevin Sharkey (1-42); Paul Nolan (30-36, 38 & 43); Emma Ridley (episode 31); Pat Sharp (33 & 35-43)
- Country of origin: United Kingdom
- Original language: English
- No. of series: 1
- No. of episodes: 43

Production
- Running time: 30 minutes
- Production company: Tyne Tees Television

Original release
- Network: ITV
- Release: 9 June 1987 – 5 April 1988

The Roxy is a British music television programme broadcast on the ITV network from June 1987 to April 1988 and was produced by Tyne Tees Television in Newcastle, shortly after its more successful Channel 4 music show, The Tube, was decommissioned.

The show was initially presented by David Jensen and Kevin Sharkey. The first edition was transmitted across the ITV network on 9 June 1987, introducing Erasure performing "Victim of Love". Subtitled as The Network Chart Show, The Roxy was based on the weekly chart compiled for Independent Local Radio which was broadcast on Sunday afternoons across ILR stations every Sunday afternoon from 5pm, in competition with BBC Radio 1's own chart show.

In January 1988 the programme was retitled Roxy The Network Chart Show and was introduced alongside a new studio set, which included a large 20-foot multicoloured sign spelling ROXY (this fell over at the end of the final edition using a flashpot effect and slow motion video, followed by "Leader of the Pack" by The Shangri-Las playing). In addition to the revamp of the set, David Jensen was just a voiceover reading the charts each week but he returned to presenting duties for the final edition; Kevin Sharkey was the main presenter and was joined by Paul Nolan, and later Pat Sharp, as co-host.

The programme suffered from not having a fixed network timeslot and for a short time, an industrial dispute which affected live studio performances. After just ten months on air, The Roxy aired its final edition on Tuesday 5 April 1988. By this point, some regional stations aired the programme around midnight like Anglia, Grampian, STV, TVS, Thames and Yorkshire.

The demise of The Roxy also signalled the end of major live music television production at Tyne Tees, which asides The Tube, had also spanned series such as Alright Now, Razzmatazz and Check it Out. The company also produced coverage of Queen's concerts at Wembley and the Milton Keynes Bowl and co-produced U2 Live at Red Rocks: Under a Blood Red Sky.

== Opening theme ==
The programme had three different theme tunes during its run. The first, written and performed by Simon May, was used for the first 29 episodes; the second, performed by 4's Company, was only used for episode 30; and the third, called "Amnesia", written and performed by Stock Aitken Waterman, was used for episodes 31 through 43.
