= Consumer Bankers Association =

U.S. trade organization

- Abbreviation: CBA
- Predecessor: National Morris Plan Banker's Association
- Formation: 1919; 107 years ago
- Headquarters: Washington, D.C.
- President and CEO: Lindsey Johnson
- Website: www.consumerbankers.com

The Consumer Bankers Association (CBA) is a U.S. trade organization representing financial institutions offering retail lending products and services. It was originally founded in 1919 as the National Morris Plan Bankers Association and changed its name to the Consumer Bankers Association in 1947.

== Organization ==
The Consumer Bankers Association (CBA) was founded in 1919 and is headquartered in Washington, D.C. The CBA primarily represents retail banks in the U.S. with approximately $10 billion or more in assets. Membership ranges from national banks to regional banks, including both industrial and commercial banks. Corporate member institutions of the CBA account for 1.6 million jobs in America.

== History ==
The Consumer Bankers Association originated as an association formed to promote Morris Plan Banks. Arthur J. Morris started the Morris Plan Banking system to make bank loans accessible for ordinary people without business affiliation. "Morris Plan" was a licensed name for “industrial banks”, a term to describe banks with a heavy focus on consumer credit. In 1919, the National Morris Plan Bankers Association formed with the aim of promoting the banks. Thomas Coughlin, previously President of Morris Plan Bank of Cleveland, was made the first president of the new association. The organization's name changed to Consumer Bankers Association in 1947.

== Leadership ==
Joe Belew was president from 1987 until his death in 2009. The CBA named an award after him to present to banks with impactful programs serving consumers.

Richard Hunt served as president and CEO from May 2009 until stepping down in July 2022.

On July 5, 2022, Lindsey Johnson began her tenure as president and CEO. Johnson most recently served as President of the U.S. Mortgage Insurers.

== Annual conference ==
The CBA holds an annual conference for its members in various cities each spring. Locations have included Washington, D.C., Phoenix, Arizona, and Orlando, Florida. In 2010, the organization created CBA LIVE to combine multiple conferences into a single three-day event. The conference focuses on retail banking with various educational tracks.

== Activities ==
=== Lobbying and regulation ===
The CBA lobbies on behalf of its members on legislation and policies focused on the banking industry. Its lobbying activities are mainly focused on coordinating regulations of banks and the transparency of federal student loans. The CBA has advocated for the increase of student loans from private banks rather than direct federal loans, as well as tuition loan caps from government issued loans to individual graduate students and parents of undergraduates. The organization lobbied in support of the Economic Growth, Regulatory Relief, and Consumer Protection Act, which included terms to revisit current bank regulations. In August 2018, the CBA announced their support in the revising of the Community Reinvestment Act.

The CBA represents consumers and retail banks in discussion of regulation of retail banks and loan products with the Office of the Comptroller of the Currency, Consumer Financial Protection Bureau and the Federal Deposit Insurance Corporation.

In 2018, the CBA criticized the CFPB's public access database of complaints on the basis of consumer privacy. The CBA also urged congress to create a bipartisan commission to manage CFPB.

=== Educational programs ===
The Consumer Bankers Association established and operates the CBA Executive Banking School. The school began in 1952 as the School of Consumer Banking with courses focused on consumer credit, and was later known as the Graduate School of Consumer Banking as well as the Graduate School for Retail Banking Management. Classes were previously held in Charlottesville, Virginia at the University of Virginia. The core areas of education offered by the CBA include functional bank management, human resources management, financial statements, consumer banking services, economics, marketing, and thesis preparation. As of July 2008, the CBA and the Bank Administration Institute combined their individual banking schools to create the CBA/BAI Graduate School of Retail Bank Management. The partnership between CBA and BAI ended and, in 2015, the school was renamed CBA Executive Banking School. Classes are held at Furman University in Greenville, South Carolina.

In 2002, the school established the Tem Wooldridge Award, named for a retired faculty member. The annual award is presented to a graduating senior selected by peers for excellence in integrity, academics and leadership.
