= St Patrick's College, Gympie =

Coordinates: 26.1910°S 152.6667°E

- Gympie, Queensland; Australia

Information
- Former names: Christian Brothers' College for Boys (1904–1983); Sisters of Mercy High School for Girls (1916–1983)
- Type: Private systemic secondary day school
- Motto: English: Let Your Light Shine
- Religious affiliation: Catholicism
- Denomination: Christian Brothers (1904–1983); Sisters of Mercy (1916–1983)
- Established: 1904; 122 years ago (as Christian Brothers' College for Boys)
- Oversight: Archdiocese of Brisbane (since 1983)
- Headmaster: Mark Newton
- Gender: Co-educational
- Enrolment: 470 (2020)
- Website: www.spcgympie.qld.edu.au

St Patrick's College is a Catholic systemic co-educational secondary day school, located in Gympie, Queensland, Australia. St Patrick's College is a parish-based Catholic College catering for Years 7 to 12. In 2020, just over 470 students were enrolled at the college.

== History ==
The college has provided Catholic education for the Gympie district for over 100 years. Christian Brothers' College for Boys was established in 1904 by the Christian Brothers and the Sisters of Mercy established Sisters of Mercy High School for Girls in 1916. Those colleges were combined in 1983 to form St Patrick's College, which is located on the old Christian Brothers' College site.

== See also ==
- Lists of schools in Queensland
