= Assumption College, Warwick =

School in Queensland, Australia

Assumption College Warwick

Location
- 6 Locke Street Warwick, Queensland; Australia; 28°13′33.52″S 152°1′40.20″E

Information
- Type: Independent Roman Catholic Coeducational Junior Secondary education institution
- Motto: Truth and Love
- Religious affiliations: Roman Catholic (Sisters of Mercy)
- Established: 1969; 57 years ago
- Founder: Sisters of Mercy
- Principal: Liisa Hammond
- Enrolment: 454 (2023)
- Website: Official site

Assumption College, Warwick is an independent, Roman Catholic, co-educational secondary school, located in Warwick, Queensland, Australia. It is administered by the Queensland Catholic Education Commission, with an enrolment of 454 students and a teaching staff of 46, as of 2023. The school serves students from Year 7 to Year 12, and is the only Catholic, secondary school located in Warwick.

== History ==
The school opened on 29 August 1969, run by the Sisters of Mercy until 1988. Since 1989, the college has been administered solely by lay staff.

== Demographics ==
In 2023, the school had a student enrollment of 454 with 46 teachers (42.7 full-time equivalent) and 26 non-teaching staff (22 full-time equivalent). Female enrollments consisted of 240 students and Male enrollments consisted of 214 students; Indigenous enrollments accounted for a total of 11% and 2% of students had a language background other than English.

== Houses ==
The college has four houses, which provide pastoral care in addition to sporting competition. They are Dovovan, McAuley, Rice, and Romero.

Romero house was introduced in 2015, to accommodate the surge in new students.

== See also ==
- Education in Australia
- List of schools in Darling Downs
