= CBS Tramore =

Secondary school in Waterford, Ireland, until 1844

CBS Tramore was a secondary school located in Tramore, Co. Waterford, Ireland. It catered for students studying for the Irish Junior and Leaving Certificate. Since 2007, it also catered for LCA students. The school closed in June, 1999 and amalgamated with Stella Maris to form a new school, Ardscoil Na Mara. Bob Marley was a pupil at this school during his short time spent in Co Waterford, Ireland (There is currently no evidence substantiated for this claim).
