= St Joseph's Industrial School, Glin =

Coordinates: 52.566°N 9.275°W

St Joseph’s Industrial School was an industrial school in Glin, County Limerick, Ireland.

== History ==
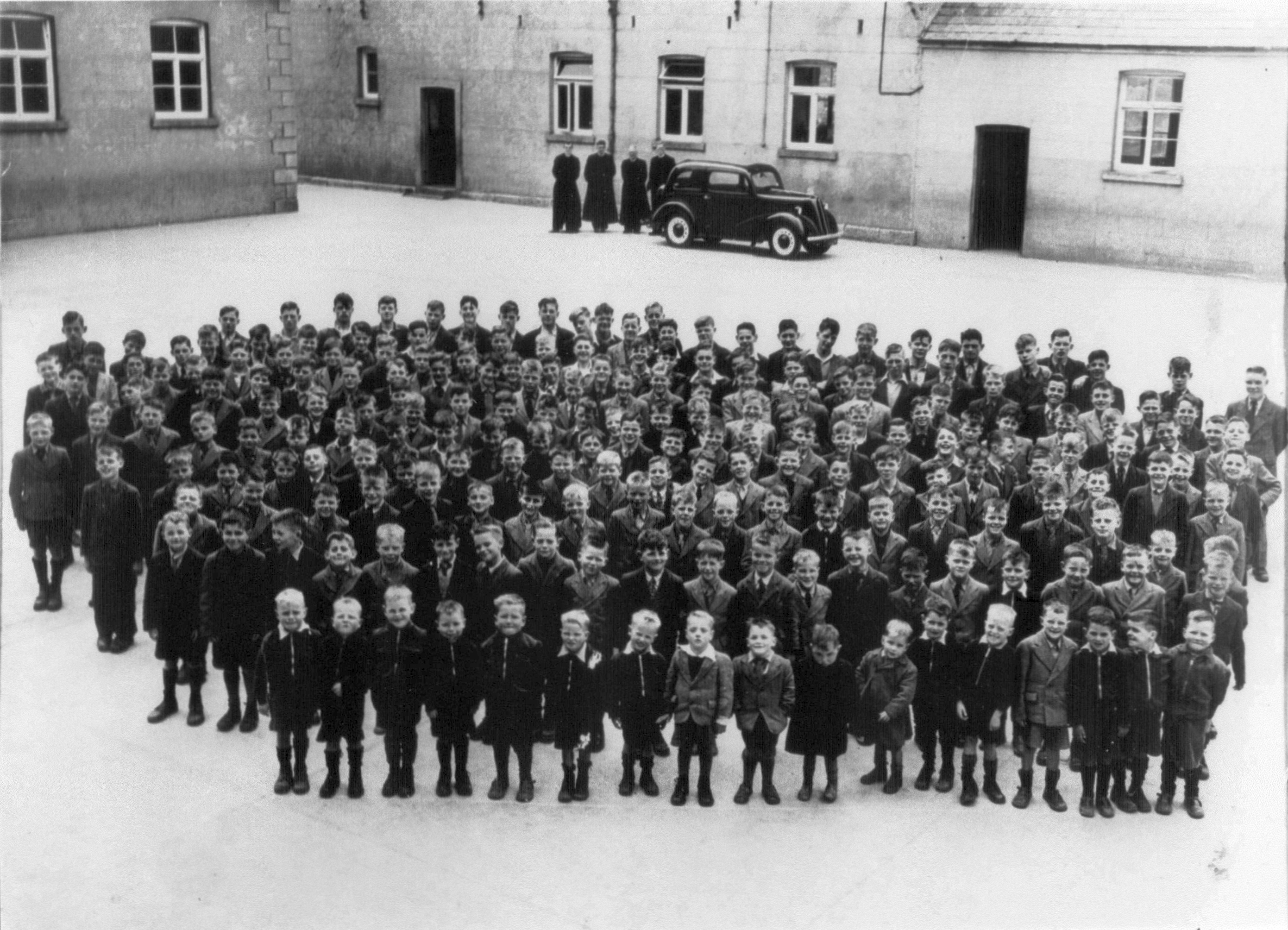
Group of boys at St. Joseph's Industrial School in the 1950s

The school was founded in 1872 in Sexton Street, Limerick. It moved to Glin in 1928 where, at its peak between 1949 and 1950, over 210 children were under detention at the school. The school operated until 1966. The school building in Glin was subsequently demolished.

== Conclusions of the Ryan report ==
=== Physical abuse ===
The 2009 report of the Commission to Inquire into Child Abuse (also known as the Ryan report) criticised the Department of Education for failing in its supervisory duties, protecting the institution and dismissing serious complaints. The report noted that the Department of Education had been aware that a boys' jaw was fractured, probably by Brother Marceau (pseudonym), and that the child was hospitalised. Brother Marceau was transferred to another residential school in Tralee. The reported described Glin as having a "severe, systemic regime of corporal punishment".

=== Sexual abuse ===
According to the Ryan report, two Christian Brothers, Br. Buiron and Piperel (pseudonyms) were transferred to Glin, having been investigated about sexual abuse in other industrial schools at earlier dates. The Ryan commission described the decision to transfer them as "reckless".
