= Our Lady of the Southern Cross College, Dalby =

Our Lady of the Southern Cross College

Location
- Dalby, Darling Downs, Queensland; Australia; 27°10′17″S 151°16′02″E

Information
- Type: Independent secondary school
- Motto: Journey in Faith and Knowledge
- Religious affiliation: Catholicism
- Established: 2008; 18 years ago
- Oversight: Diocese of Toowoomba
- Principal: John Hegarty
- Years offered: Prep–12
- Gender: Co-educational
- Enrolment: c. 770 (2012)
- Campus: Rural Urban
- Colours: Black, white and red
- Website: www.dalby.catholic.edu.au/default.htm

Our Lady of the Southern Cross College is a systemic Roman Catholic co-educational secondary day school located in the town of Dalby, approximately 250 kilometres (160 mi) northwest of Brisbane, Queensland, Australia.

== Overview ==
Established in 2008, the college caters for students from preparatory to Year 12. It is the only Catholic school in Dalby and it also serves a large rural area and a number of small towns. Prior to 2008, St Columba's school, established by the Sisters of Mercy in 1877, was the Catholic primary school for Dalby and St Mary's Catholic College, established by the Christian Brothers in 1962, was the Catholic secondary college for Dalby. In 2012 the enrolment was 770 students including 455 students in the Primary section of the college.

== See also ==
- Catholic education in Australia
- List of schools in Queensland
