= Xavier Catholic College, Albury =

Xavier Catholic College

Location
- 294 Fallon Street; Albury, New South Wales; Australia; 36°03′47″S 146°56′04″E

Information
- Type: Independent systemic secondary co-educational day school
- Motto: The truth will set you free
- Religious affiliation: Catholicism
- Denomination: Congregation of Christian Brothers (1885–2002)
- Patron saint: Francis Xavier
- Established: 1983; 43 years ago
- Founder: Brother John Henry Thornber, Sister Gwenda Livermore
- Status: Open
- Educational authority: New South Wales Department of Education
- Oversight: Diocese of Wagga Wagga
- Principal: Nicole Morton
- Teaching staff: 66
- Years offered: 7–12
- Gender: Co-educational
- Enrolment: c. 900
- Colours: Green; Gold
- Website: www.xhsww.catholic.edu.au

Xavier Catholic College, Albury is an independent Catholic secondary day school for boys and girls, located in Albury, New South Wales, Australia.

Xavier Catholic College is supported and partially funded by the Catholic School's Office of the Diocese of Wagga Wagga and accommodates approximately 900 students between Year 7 and Year 12. The school's motto is taken from verse 8:32 of the Gospel of John, which reads, "the truth will set you free."

== History ==
Formerly Xavier High School, at the beginning of 2025 the school changed its name to Xavier Catholic College.

Catholic schooling in the Albury region dates back to 1868, when the Sisters of Mercy established St Brigid's College on a small plot of land owned by St Patrick's Parish, in South Albury. In 1885, the Patrician Brothers opened a school for boys in an adjacent block in Olive Street, also owned by St Patrick's Parish. This school for boys was re-inaugurated by the Congregation of Christian Brothers in 1917, the same year St Brigid's College was redeveloped and renamed as St Joseph's Ladies College. All teaching was performed by clergy of the Church.

In 1959, a northern campus of the Boys College was established in Fallon Street, North Albury, named Aquinas College. In 1983, the boys and girls schools were merged to create the present-day Xavier High School, named after Saint Francis Xavier. The campuses remained separate until January 2001 when the school moved to the Northern Campus. Today, the school employs over 60 teaching staff.

== Sports and extra-curricular ==
Xavier Catholic College is represented in a number of sporting activities, including school based Athletics, Swimming and Cross-country and individual and team sports. Extracurricular activities include Musical Performance evenings, Art Exhibitions, Stage Productions and involvement in ANZAC day services.

== Notable alumni ==
- Ward Austin – radio DJ
- Dr Patryck Lloyd-Donald - Pre-eminent medical doctor
- Connor O’Sullivan- AFL player

== See also ==
- Albury High School
- List of non-government schools in New South Wales
- Catholic education in Australia
