= Kildare Catholic College =

School in New South Wales, Australia

Kildare College
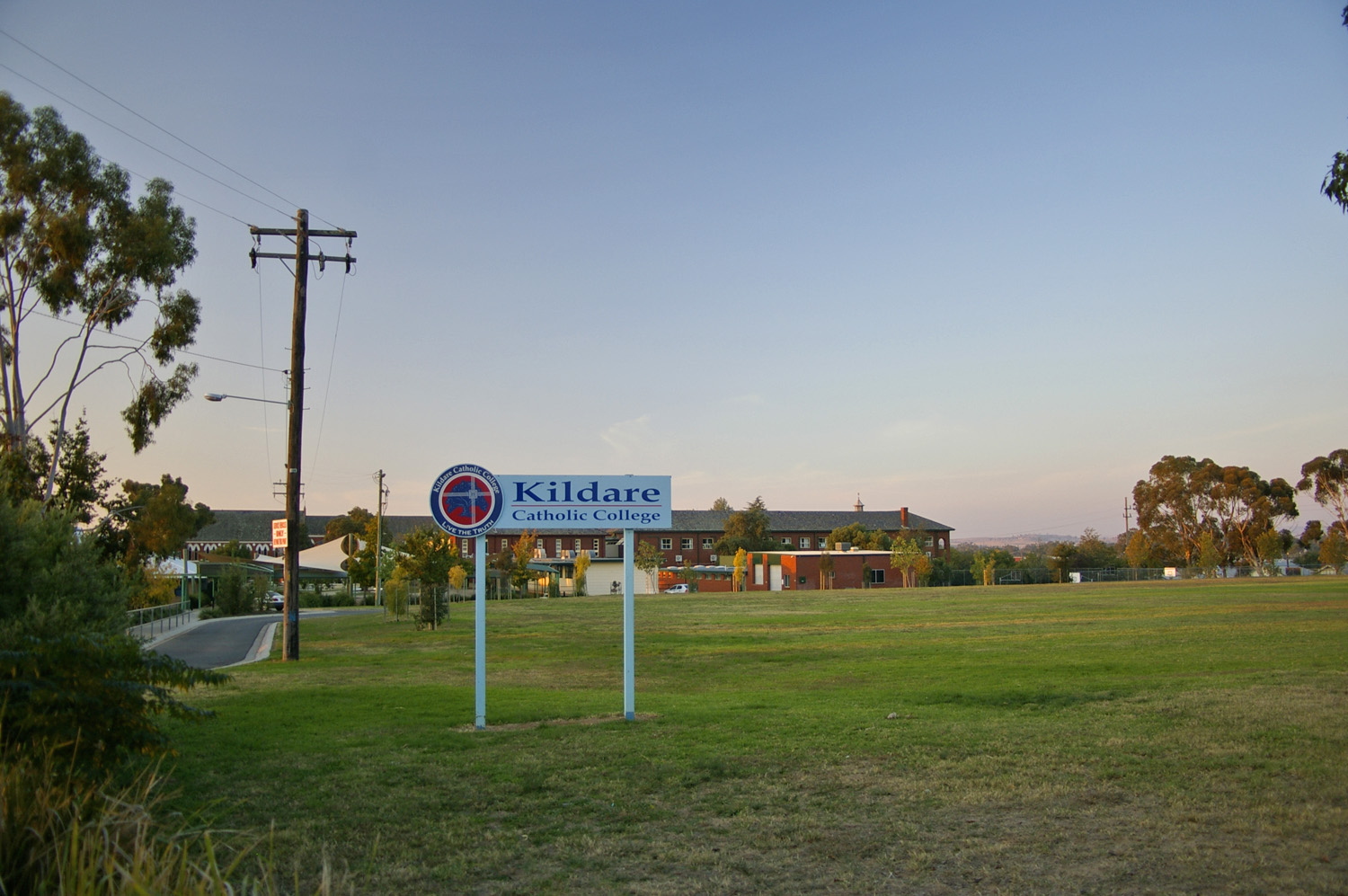

Location
- Wagga Wagga, New South Wales; Australia; 35.121471°S 147.36376°E

Information
- Type: Independent co-educational secondary day school
- Motto: Live the truth
- Denomination: Roman Catholic
- Established: 2004; 22 years ago
- Educational authority: New South Wales Department of Education
- Oversight: Roman Catholic Diocese of Wagga Wagga
- Principal: Christie Scutti
- Staff: 49 (2025)
- Teaching staff: 71.8 FTE (2025)
- Years: Year 7 to Year 12
- Enrolment: 972 (2025)
- Campus type: Inner Regional
- Houses: Romero; King; Teresa; Gandhi; Oodgeroo; Benedicta
- Colours: Red, navy blue and white
- Website: kildarecatholiccollege.com

Kildare Catholic College is an independent Roman Catholic co-educational secondary day school located in Wagga Wagga, New South Wales, Australia.

== Overview ==
Kildare has seven houses, all of which are named after people of peace. Each house has its own colour. The six houses are as follows: Romero (orange), King (red), Teresa (sky blue), Gandhi (navy blue), Oodgeroo (green), and Benedicta (gold).

Since its founding in 2004 Kildare has performed seven musicals of a high standard. Its first musical was "Back to the 80s" in 2005 followed by "Godspell" in 2007, "Bye Bye Birdie" in 2009, "All Shook Up" in 2011 and "Joseph and the Amazing Technicolor Dreamcoat" in 2013. In 2015 they performed "High School Musical: On Stage". 2017 saw a reprise of "All Shook Up".

Accompanying these musical performances, Kildare Catholic College hosts an annual abridged Shakespeare production. 2018 hosted a production of "MacBeth". 2016's production was "Twelfth Night or What you Will". These productions are shortened to one act's length and provide an opportunity for senior drama students to perform in an open-audience context.

== History ==
Kildare Catholic College is named over County Kildare, Ireland. The school was established in 2004 as a amalgamation of St Michael's Boys High School, Mount Erin Girls High School, and Trinity Senior High School, all of which closed in December 2003.

Kildare Catholic College was established on the former site of St Michaels Boys High School.

Mount Erin High School was founded by The Presentation Sisters in 1876, and were also involved in the teaching of students at Trinity Senior High School, established in 1968. St Michael's School was established by The Christian Brothers in 1864.

== Principals ==
The following individuals have served as Principal of Kildare College:

Ordinal	Principals	Term start	Term end	Time in office	Notes
1	Patricia Burgess	2004	2012	9 years	
2	Rod Whelan	2013	2019	7 years	
3	Chistie Scutti	2019	2020	2 years	
4	Richard Sidorko (interm)	2020	2020	1 year	
5	Chris Browne	2021	2025	5 years	
6	Christie Scutti	2025	Incumbent	2 years	

== Co-Curricular ==
=== Sport ===
Kildare offers representative sporting options including; Rugby League, Australian Rules Football, Tennis, Soccer, Netball, Hockey. Kildare has achieved various sporting successes including the 2007 NSW Aussie Rules State Championship, alongside several victories in the AFL Currie Cup competition.

=== Music ===
Kildare offers participation in various music ensembles, including instrument based ensembles, a rock band, and a school choir.

== Notable Alumni ==
Alicia Lucas - Australian rugby league player and 2016 Olympic gold medalist.

== See also ==
- List of schools in the Riverina
- List of Catholic schools in New South Wales
