= Murgihatta =

Murgi Hatta is a small densely populated area in the heart of Kalimpong town in Kalimpong district, West Bengal, India. It is situated close to the Kalimpong motor stand. It (Upper Murgihatta) presently falls under ward No. XI of Kalimpong Municipality (DI Fund Area). The remaining part (Lower Murgihatta) falls under Dungra gram panchayat of Kalimpong Development Block (Khas Mahal).

It is unknown exactly how this place acquired its name. In Hindi, murgi means chicken and hatta is a market place. It could have been a small rural market area for selling and buying chicken in the 19th century.

Murgihatta is mostly populated by the Gurkha community of India. One of the oldest families recorded here belongs to the Late Dal Bahadur Lama (Tamang) (Writer Baje). It is inhabited by mixed communities i.e. Gurkha, Biharis, Tibetans. Most of the households provide rooms on rental basis especially to Government employees and hawkers /small business communities and they mostly consist of Hindu and Muslim Bihari. The oldest ferrous concrete building is Lhasha Villa which was constructed in 1953.

An old business is the selling of dried fish (Sidra / sukuti macha) carried out by the second generation of the Rai family (descendant of Sidrawalni Boju).
