= Christian Brothers School, Balmain =

Location
- Thames Street; Balmain, New South Wales; Australia
- Coordinates: 33°51′24″S 151°11′01″E

Information
- Type: Private, boys secondary, day school
- Denomination: Roman Catholic, Christian Brothers
- Established: 17 April 1887
- Status: closed
- Closed: 1990

Christian Brothers School was a Roman Catholic, boys, secondary, day school, located in Balmain, a central city suburb of Sydney, Australia.

== History ==
The School was opened by the Christian Brothers in 1887 and closed down in 1990.

== See also ==
- List of Christian Brothers schools
