= St Joseph's Industrial School, Salthill =

St Joseph's Industrial School, Salthill was an industrial school in Salthill, County Galway. It was founded in 1871 and was initially managed by the Patrician Brothers under a committee of religious and laymen.
