= St Mary's College, Maryborough =

Coordinates: 25°32′34″S 152°41′48.4″E

St Mary's College Maryborough is a Catholic co-educational secondary school in Maryborough, Queensland, Australia.

== History ==
Originally called the Christian Brothers' College, Maryborough, St Mary's College is a parish school which comprises the amalgamated schools of the Christian Brothers' College, Maryborough, and Saint Mary's Girls' High School. The Christian Brothers' school was originally opened on 3 September 1888.. Although staffed and named a Christian Brothers' school from 1888 to 1979 it was in fact a Parish school, owned and overseen by the Roman Catholic Parish of Saint Mary's Maryborough. This school was amalgamated in 1979 with the Sisters of Mercy school, Maryborough, and was renamed St Mary's College, Maryborough. This secondary college is a Parish school but is affiliated and administered through the auspices of the Brisbane Catholic Education Vicariate, also known as "BCE".

The Sisters of Mercy school in Maryborough was centred on St Michael's Convent located on the corner of Lennox and Walker streets. This building was designed by well-known architect F.D.G. Stanley. In the early days of the Convent School, the Sisters of Mercy placed a strong emphasis on music tuition. Annual concerts were held to demonstrate the high standard of performance achieved by the pupils.

In November 1890, three of the Christian brothers from the school received some money from the citizens in appreciation of their contribution to education in Maryborough. Brothers Cotter, Noonan and Lawless were congratulated on their efforts in helping three students pass the Sydney University Junior Examination.

The Golden Jubilee of the Sisters of Mercy in Maryborough was celebrated in October 1930, with a concert held in the Maryborough City Hall.

On 22 June 1920, Archbishop Duhig blessed extensions to the Christian Brothers' High School in Maryborough.

In May 1922, a fundraising fete was held to assist the Sisters of Mercy to pay for extensions to the chapel in St Michael's Convent. A similar fundraiser had been held the previous year to defray debt incurred by the Christian Brothers in running the Christian Brothers' College in Maryborough. In early 1941, the a case of infantile paralysis occurred in the infants school of what was then known as St Michael's Convent School, and some of the classes were closed under the government policy of the day.

== Bibliography ==
- 100 Years and More – Catholicism in Maryborough 1849–1980 local history text.
