= Christian Brothers Academy =

Christian Brothers Academy is the name of schools run by the Institute of the Brothers of the Christian Schools, including:

- Christian Brothers Academy (New Jersey), Lincroft, New Jersey
- Christian Brothers Academy (Albany, New York)
- Christian Brothers Academy (DeWitt, New York), a suburb of Syracuse
