= St Joseph's Industrial School, Tralee =

St Joseph's Industrial School, Tralee was an industrial school in Tralee, County Kerry, Ireland. It was situated on the western side of Tralee, on the road to Ardfert.

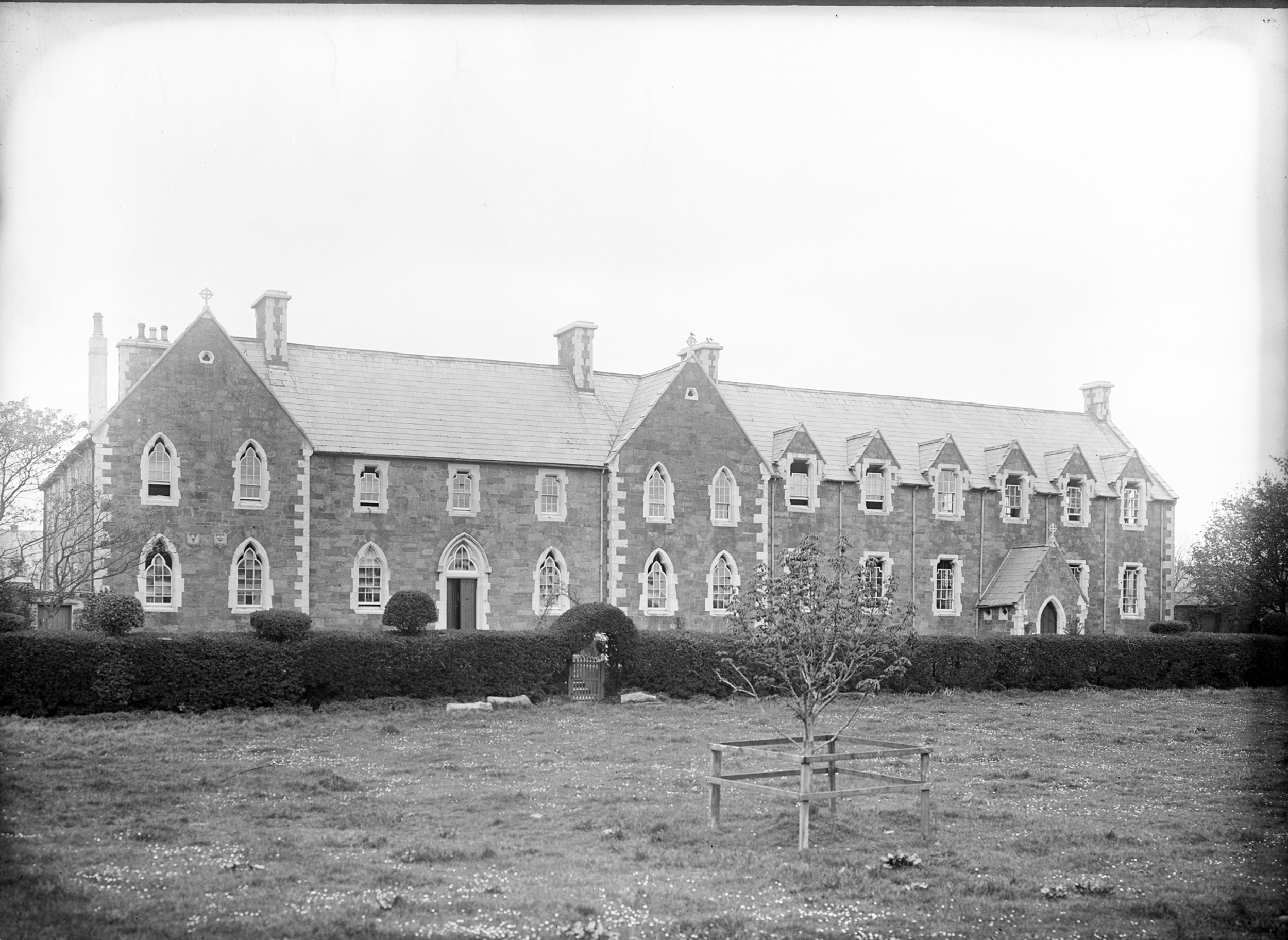
St. Joseph's Industrial School 1910

== History ==
The school was initially a National school which had been founded on the gift of land and money to the Congregation of Christian Brothers by John Mulchinock, a Tralee draper. It was established in 1862.

It was transformed into an industrial school by the request of the parish priest, Dean John Mawe, and the day school pupils were transferred to another Christian Brothers school in Tralee.

It was closed in 1970.

== Ryan Commission ==
For legal reasons the Commission used pseudonyms.

=== Physical abuse ===
The Commission concluded that physical aggression was used to control the large number of children, that despite the concerns of the Superior General, corporal punishment was not decreased.

In particular, the case of Br. Marceau (pseudonym) was cited as an example of how excessive punishment was not considered a problem unless it risked the reputation of the Christian Brothers or could bring about legal action. The Christian Brothers' handling of this case was described as "uncaring and reckless management by the Congregation".

Younger boys were victims of physical and sexual abuse by older boys.

Boys at Tralee were more vulnerable because they had no parents to protect them. They were also subject to what the report called "troublesome brothers" who were known to be dangerous and who were posted to Tralee.

=== Sexual abuse ===
A Brother Garon (pseudonym) was subject of complaints which a junior member of the Christian Brothers reported to three successive superior who didn't deal with it.

Inadequate supervision led to sexual abuse of younger pupils by older pupils. One acknowledged abuser was on the staff for 20 years.

=== Food ===
Despite there being a farm where food was sold for private profit, boys sometimes went hungry.

=== Death of boy from school ===
Robert Moore (pseudonym), a 16-year-old pupil in the school, died in Tralee County Hospital in the late 1950s. His death certificate recorded the cause of his death as "Bilateral Pleural Effusion. Senility. Certified", though the Commission noted that "Senility" was later amended to read "septicaemia".

Allegations that Robert Moore had received a beating from Brother Lafayette (pseudonym) had been made and the Christian Brothers acknowledged that the beating had happened but that the severity was unknown.

The Commission concluded that it is not possible to tell whether the beating Brother Lafayette gave Robert was connected with the boys' death. That the boys could not eat a meal without the threat of violence was described as "particularly cruel".

The Commission stated that there should have been an inquiry into Roberts' death given that he died shortly after being hit, as it could have discovered whether the beating was a factor in his death or if he was already seriously ill.
