= Christian Brothers' College, Mount Edmund =

CBC Mount Edmund

Location
- Pretoria, Gauteng; South Africa; 25°44.230′S 28°16.187′E

Information
- Type: Private, coeducational
- Motto: Viriliter Age (Act Courageously)
- Religious affiliation: Roman Catholic
- Established: 1 September 1922; 103 years ago
- Headmaster: Mr. Derek Bradley
- Exam board: IEB
- Grades: 000–12 (PreK-12)
- Gender: Boys & Girls
- Age: 4 to 18
- Enrollment: 700 pupils
- Language: English
- Schedule: 07:30 – 14:00
- Campus: Urban Campus
- Campus type: Suburban
- Colours: Blue; Green; Yellow; White
- Slogan: Faith – Leadership – Excellence
- Newspaper: CBC Herald
- Website: www.cbcpretoria.co.za

The Christian Brothers' College, Mount Edmund (formerly Christian Brothers' College St. Gabriel's until 1969) is a private, Roman Catholic high school in Pretoria, South Africa.

== Principals and headmasters ==
Principal	Years	Deputy Principal	Years
Br. J.J. Mullen, CFC	1922-23-?	unknown	1922–97
unknown	1923–67	unknown	1922–97
Br. Leopold Kennedy, CFC	?-1967-68	unknown	1922–97
Br. Smith, CFC	1968–69	unknown	1922–97
Br. Thackaberry, CFC	1969-70-?	unknown	1922–97
Br. Kelleher	1970–76	unknown	1922–97
Br. Farrel	1976–85	unknown	1922–97
Br. O'Neill, CFC	1985–88	unknown	1922–97
Br. McCarthy, CFC	1988–91	unknown	1922–97
David Olivier	1991–96		
Headmaster	Years	Deputy Headmaster	Years
Mr. E.J. Brown	1997–2002	Alec Hartley	1997–2008
Peter R. Ross	2002–2016	Michael Pike	2008–
Bernard Langton	2017 – 2023	Michael Pike	2008–
Derek Bradley	2024 -		

== Emmanuel Place of Hope ==
For a number of years the college has supported a small pre-school in Soshanguve, Emmanuel Place of Hope. This school has grown from a settlement on a landfill site to a functional container school with classrooms, a playground and staff.
