= Christian Brothers College, Rose Bay =

Christian Brothers' College, Rose Bay

Location
- 8 Carlisle Street; Rose Bay, New South Wales; Australia
- Coordinates: 33°52′14″S 151°16′19″E

Information
- Type: Private, boys secondary, day school
- Denomination: Roman Catholic, Christian Brothers
- Established: 27 January 1935
- Closed: 1966

Christian Brothers College was established by the Christian Brothers in Carlisle St, Rose Bay, a suburb of Sydney, New South Wales, Australia in 1935. The college was closed down in 1966 and the site is now used as a Catholic primary school called McAuley Catholic Primary School (previously McAuley Preparatory School).

== See also ==
- List of Christian Brothers schools
