= Christian Brothers College, Burwood =

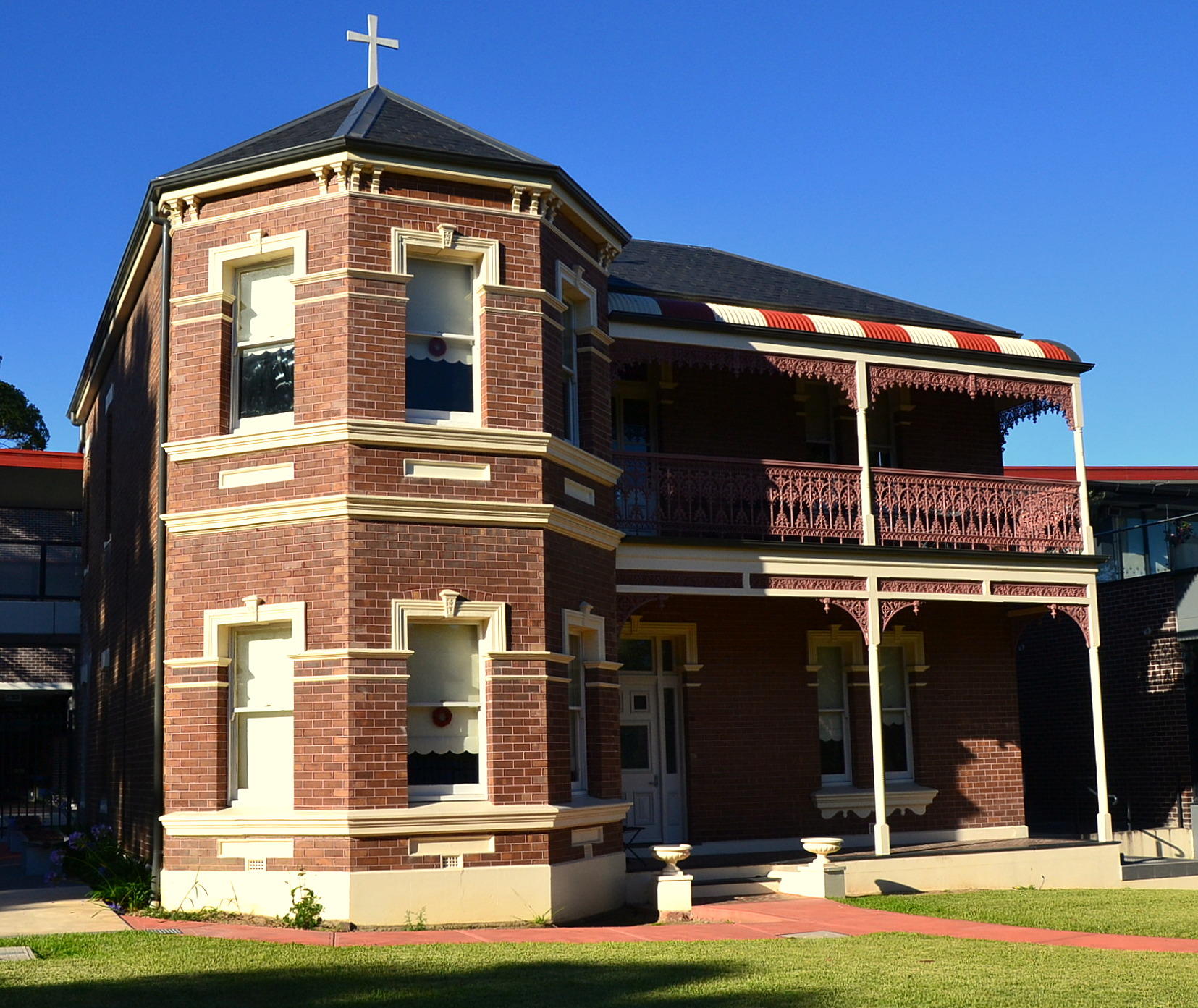
- Former school building, now used as a building for Southern Cross Catholic Vocational College

Location
- 17 Comer Street; Burwood, New South Wales; Australia
- Coordinates: 33°52′19″S 151°06′11″E

Information
- Type: Roman Catholic, all-male, secondary, day
- Motto: Latin: Auspice Christo (Guided by Christ)
- Established: 1909
- Founder: Br. P.G. O'Neill
- Status: Closed
- Closed: 2009
- Grades: 7–10
- Colours: Sky blue, navy and white
- Affiliations: Roman Catholic
- Website: Archived website

Christian Brothers College, Burwood (CBC Burwood) was a Catholic high school located in Burwood, Sydney Australia. The school was founded in 1909. It was announced on 25 March 2008 that the school would close at the end of 2009, due to a decline in enrolment arising from a change in demographics in the suburbs surrounding the school.

At closing, it taught boys from Year 7 to Year 10. The school chapel, the school grotto, the lower yard classrooms, and the old wall ball court were demolished, though the brothers' house and other buildings were left intact.

Its former premises are occupied by Southern Cross Catholic Vocational College, a co-educational specialized vocational school founded in 2010.

== House colours ==
Christian Brothers' College Burwood's homeroom classes and sport teams were divided by colours, which were nominated by significant names:

- Red for Gadigal (the Gadigal people once lived on the land the school was built on)
- Yellow for Moylan (Br. Brian Moylan)
- Green for O'Neill (the first principal)
- Blue for Delany (one of the school's principals)

== Notable alumni ==
- Scott Sio – Rugby player
- John Brown – former MP of Parramatta
- Robert Luketic – film director (Legally Blonde and 21)
- Anthony Šerić – soccer player
- Taliauli Latukefu – actor
