= Presidency of Mary Robinson =

Presidency of Ireland from 1990 to 1997

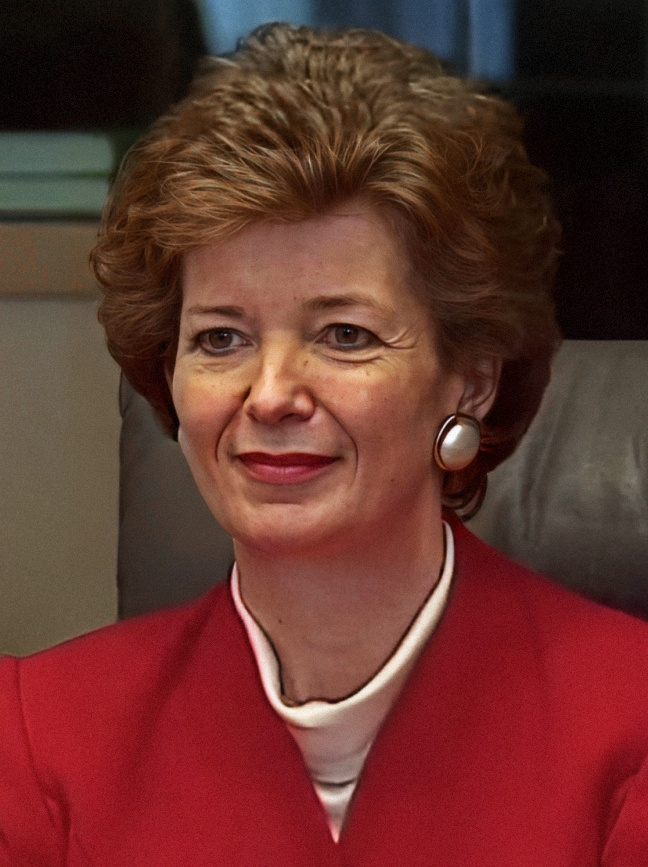
- Robinson in 1995
- Presidency of Mary Robinson; 3 December 1990 – 12 September 1997
- Premier: Charles Haughey, Albert Reynolds, John Bruton, Bertie Ahern
- Party: None (Was affiliated with Labour from 1977 to 1985)
- Election: 1990
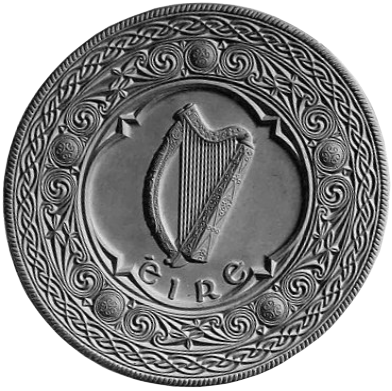
- Seal of the president of Ireland

Mary Robinson served as President of Ireland between 1990 and 1997. Ireland's first female president, Robinson became the most popular president in Irish history. Prior to her election, she served seven terms as a senator, and concurrent with her time in Seanad Éireann she worked as a lawyer and academic. Robinson resigned the presidency early to take up the position of High Commissioner of Human Rights with the United Nations.

Following a 20-year career in the Seanad (Senate), Robinson was elected to the presidency following one of the most controversial elections in the Irish state. She was seen as an underdog at the outset of the election and her victory is often credited to major political gaffes made by the favourite to win the race, Brian Lenihan, and his election team.

== Background ==
On 5 July 1989 Robinson retired from the Seanad as she wished to focus her attention on the Irish Centre for European Law which she had founded alongside her husband at Trinity College Dublin. One year after her retirement from the Seanad, the Labour Party approached her about running for president in that year's election. Initially, Robinson believed she was being asked her legal advice about the type of policy programme Dick Spring, the party leader, was proposing. As she read the briefing notes, however, she began to realise that the programme was aimed at her. After some consideration, she agreed to become the first Labour nominee for the presidency and the first woman candidate in what was only the second presidential election to be contested by three candidates since 1945.

Despite the Irish constitution stating that presidential elections are to be held every seven years, in practice four presidents have been elected by consent, and the 1990 election the first presidential election held in 17 years.

== Election campaign ==
The 1990 presidential campaign has been described as "highly controversial", and "the dirtiest of all" in Irish electoral history. Robinson was not only the first female candidate to ever contest the office, she was also, at 46 years of age, the youngest candidate to ever contest it. There were three candidates for the office: Brian Lenihan, Fianna Fáil's candidate, Austin Currie, Fine Gael's candidate, and Robinson, who was Labour's candidate, despite no longer being officially affiliated with the party.

For the majority of the campaign, it was widely expected that Lenihan would handily win the election. In the last two weeks of the election, however, Lenihan's campaign was mired in controversy, which ultimately tipped the balance in favour of Robinson. On 22 October 1990, Garret FitzGerald appeared on the RTÉ show Questions & Answers, and accused Lenihan of making inappropriate phone calls to ex-president Patrick Hillery, in an attempt to persuade the president to invite Charles Haughey to form a government without calling a general election. Lenihan repeatedly denied that he had made such a phone call, but on 25 October Jim Duffy released a recording in which Lenihan confirmed that he had in fact made the call. Lenihan went on to state that "on mature recollection" he had not made the call, a statement which was widely disbelieved and which has since become a euphemism in Ireland for someone changing their story after being proven to be lying. Support for Lenihan plunged, with polls showing a decrease from an expected 52% of first-preference-votes to 33%, while Robinson's support increased from 31% of first-preference-votes to 51%. One week from the election, a second scandal resulted in backlash against the Lenihan campaign, particularly amongst women. Pádraig Flynn, then a Fianna Fáil cabinet minister, appeared on the radio programme Saturday View, and delivered a sexist diatribe against Robinson, despite attempts from other panelists to silence him. Among other things, he criticised Robinson for having a "newfound interest in her family", as well as claiming that she "has to have new clothes and her new look and her new hairdo and she has the new interest in family, being a mother and all that kind of thing. But you know, none of us who knew Mary Robinson very well in previous incarnations ever heard her claiming to be a great wife and mother."

In the election on 9 November, Lenihan won the largest share of first-preference-votes, with 44.1%, and Robinson was in second position with 38.9%. Robinson, however, secured 76.7% of Currie's transfer votes, the result being that Robinson won the presidency with a final share of 52.8% of the vote to Lenihan's 47.2%. Robinson was inaugurated as president on 3 December 1990.

== Time in office ==
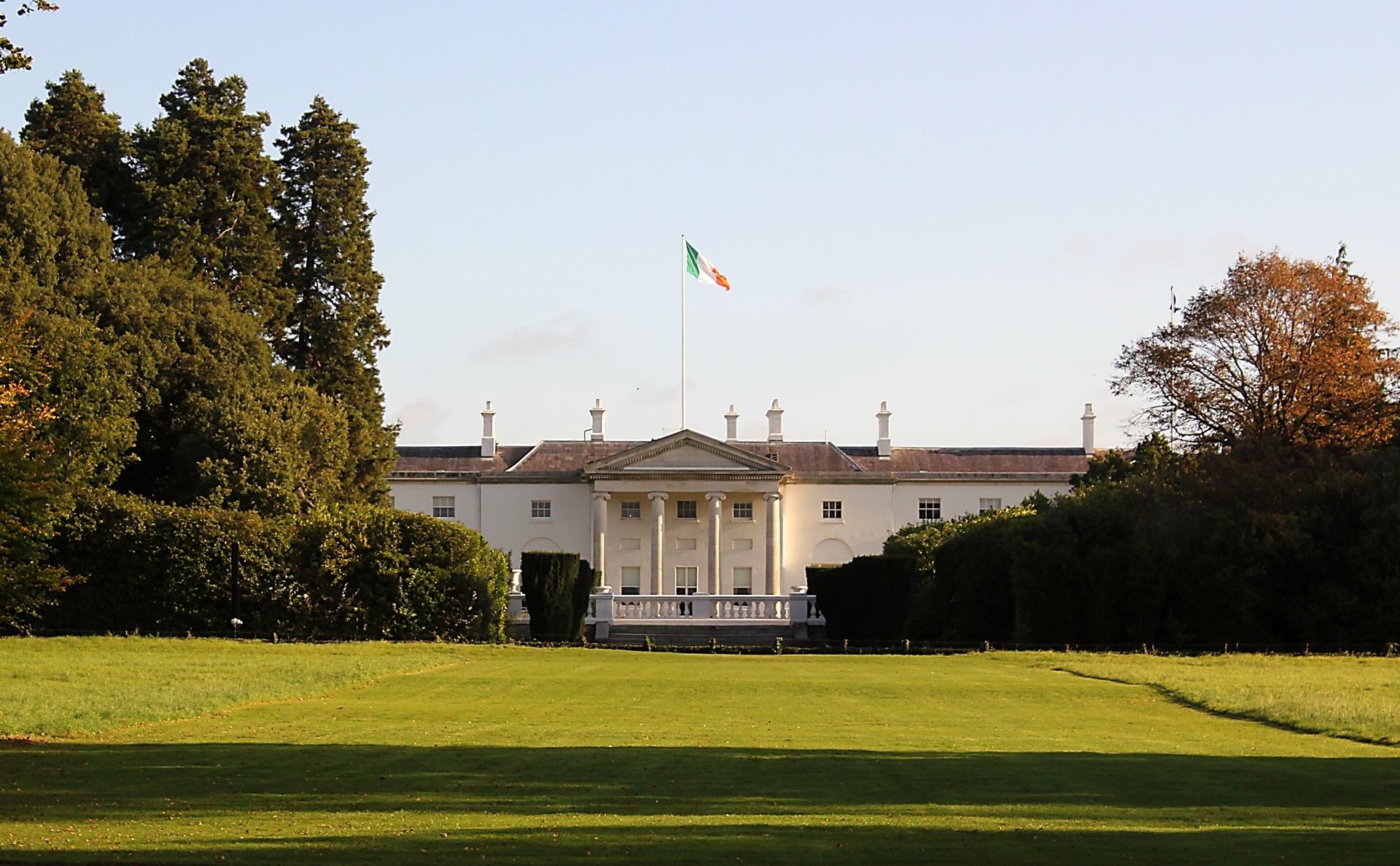
Áras an Uachtaráin

Robinson was declared president-elect on 8 November 1990 following the election of the day before, and was inaugurated on 3 December 1990.

Robinson became the first female president, as well as the first president elected who was not backed by Fianna Fáil. Robinson's presidency was characterised by support for Irish emigrants and the Irish diaspora, and concern for human rights globally.

Robinson's first controversy while in office surrounded the dismissal of eight members of her household staff at Áras an Uachtaráin, who were dubbed "The Áras Eight" by the media. News of the dismissals were leaked to the press Christmas week of 1990, and the ensuing publicity proved to be a point of embarrassment for Robinson, who had been a member of the Labour Party from 1976 to 1985.

In February 1991, the government put forward legislation to increase the presidential representation allowance to £100,000, and to provide for further increases in future. In 1973, the allowance had been set by law at IR£15,000. This had not been changed in the interim, despite significant inflation — if it had followed inflation, the allowance would have increased to £86,000 by the time of Robinson's election. The proposed legislation provided the members of Dáil Éireann a rare chance to discuss the president, as there is a constitutional convention prohibiting discussion of the presidency in the chamber. This led to the Ceann Comhairle having to repeatedly caution Teachtaí Dála for discussing the "personality, personality, or characteristics" of Robinson.

In 1991, Robinson was invited by the BBC to deliver the prestigious Dimbleby lecture. The Irish government, however, has the power to prevent the president from leaving the country, and Charles Haughey's government refused to permit Robinson to travel to the UK to deliver the lecture. (Note: The power of the government to prevent the president leaving the country is enshrined in Article 12.9 of the Irish constitution, which states that "the President shall not leave the State [...] save with the consent of the Government". Moreover, though Articles 13.7.1 and 13.7.2 permit the president to address either house of the Oireachtas on any matter of national or public importance, and further to "address a message to the Nation at any time and on any such matter", Article 13.7.3 qualifies that provision by stating that "every such message or address must, however, have received the approval of the Government".) Robinson was to be speaking on the position of women and the family in Ireland. Wary of Robinson's position as a feminist and human rights lawyer, the government prevented her leaving as they wished to avoid the negative publicity that they believed would arise from a speech they believed would be highly critical of the Irish state.

During her time as a barrister and a senator, Robinson was known for fighting for the civil rights of Irish people. As president, she became known for her efforts to promote human rights on a global scale. In October 1992, she traveled to Somalia following the outbreak of the Somali Civil War and a resulting famine, becoming the first Irish head of state to visit the country, as well as the first head of state of any nation to visit the country following the conflict. The Somalis had been described by their British colonisers as "the Irish of Africa", and by the time of Robinson's visit, many Irish relief agencies were based in the country. On the last day of her visit, Robinson delivered an emotional speech in Nairobi, Kenya, in which her voice repeatedly cracked and she was visibly upset. Reflecting on what she had seen in the country, Robinson stated that "I find that I cannot be entirely calm speaking to you because I have such a sense of what the world must take responsibility for." In her diary, she reflected that she had been "hit by a wall of frustration, of emotion and of anger" when she attempted to communicate what she had encountered in Somalia. She travelled from Nairobi to New York, in order to make a report to the Secretary-General of the United Nations — not something which had been requested of her, but something she took upon herself to do. Following her visit, Robinson released a book, A Voice for Somalia.

In 1993, Robinson was again prevented from leaving the country by a Fianna Fáil government, this time by Albert Reynold's government. Robinson had been invited by the Brookings Institution to co-chair a committee with the stated aim of advising on reform of the UN, on the approach to its 50th anniversary. It emerged that the government were not making the case that there was a constitutional ban on Robinson's appointment, but that they had taken the decision to veto her appointment as a matter of policy, provoking criticism from the media.

On May 27, 1993, Robinson became the first Irish president to visit the United Kingdom in an official capacity, when she met with Queen Elizabeth II at Buckingham Palace. Robinson had previously met Prince Philip in 1991, when she received permission from Haughey to travel to the University of Cambridge to accept an honorary degree, where Philip was then the chancellor. Reportedly, Haughey only realised that the prince was the university's chancellor after he had already granted Robinson permission to travel. Several weeks later, on 18 June, Robinson controversially met with Sinn Féin president Gerry Adams in his West Belfast constituency.

In 1994, Robinson was the first head of state to visit Rwanda in the aftermath of the Rwandan genocide.

Robinson issued her resignation as president in a message to the Ceann Comhairle of the Dáil, taking effect on 12 September 1997. The government stated that her resignation "was not unexpected" and wished her "every success". Robinson resigned to take up appointment as United Nations High Commissioner for Human Rights. Upon her resignation as president, the role of President of Ireland was transferred to the Presidential Commission (which comprised the Chief Justice of Ireland, the Ceann Comhairle of Dáil Éireann and the Cathaoirleach of Seanad Éireann) from 12 September to 11 November 1997, when the new president Mary McAleese was sworn in. Despite leaving office with just three months remaining in her presidency, Robinson later expressed regret at her early departure, indicating she could have postponed her acceptance of High Commissioner's office.

== Popularity ==
Due to the uncontroversial nature of the role, Irish presidents tend be far more popular than any other Irish politicians. Even so, Robinson was exceptionally popular even amongst other presidents, and her popularity ratings stabilised at a level higher than those of any of her predecessors. Already well known both locally and internationally (in a compendium of Irish women released in 1988, Robinson was described as "Ireland's best known woman politician"), it was in her role as president that Robinson became one of Ireland's most popular politicians. In 1993, a major MRBI survey found that two out of every three Irish women surveyed spontaneously (i.e. without being prompted a list of candidates to choose from) stated that Robinson was the woman they most admired. Regularly polling approval ratings above 90%, approval of President Robinson peaked at 93% among the Irish public.

== Legacy ==
Robinson is credited with having had a transformative effect on the role of president, a role which up until her tenure had been seen largely as a purely symbolic office. Robinson is credited with "paving the way" for her successor, Mary McAleese, who became the first woman to succeed another woman as an elected head of state anywhere on earth.
