= Seanad career of Mary Robinson =

Mary Robinson
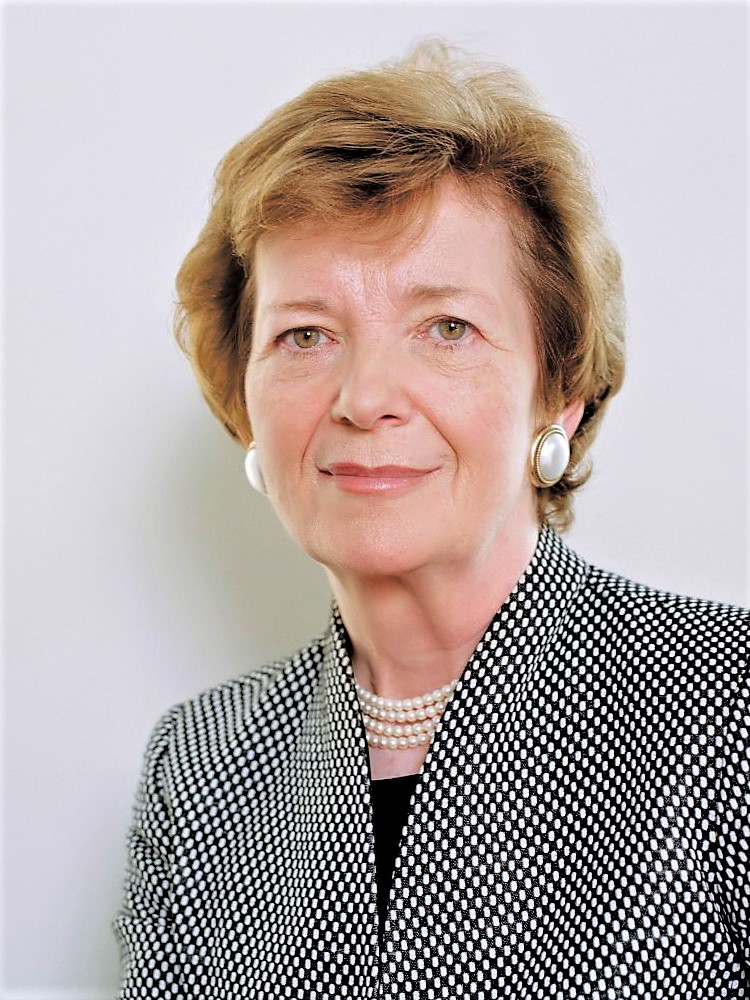

Seanad Éireann Senator
- In office 5 November 1969 – 5 July 1989

Personal details
- Party: Independent (before 1977, 1985–present)
- Other political affiliations: Labour Party (1977–1985)

The Seanad Éireann career of Mary Robinson (Irish: Máire Mhic Róibín; née Bourke) began on 11 June 1969 and ended on 5 July 1989. Mary Robinson was elected for a total of seven terms as a member of Seanad Éireann (the Irish senate), always running in the Dublin University constituency. Upon leaving her seat in 1989, she did not seek re-election.

Prior to her election, Bourke had already qualified as a lawyer and been called to the Irish Bar, and had been made the Reid Professor of Law at Trinity College Dublin. Her legal work and academic career continued concurrent with her Seanad career. First elected as an independent senator, Robinson joined the Labour Party in July 1976 during her second term as senator. Robinson left the Labour Party in 1985 and thereafter worked as an independent politician.

Known for her dissenting voice, Robinson campaigned against the Catholic Church's influence on the Irish state. A self-professed liberal, her time in the Seanad is most strongly associated with her work on issues such as the legalisation of contraception, the legalisation of divorce, the establishment of women's right to sit on juries, and her involvement with the Wood Quay protests.

== 12th Seanad (1969 – 1973) ==
=== Preliminary time as senator ===
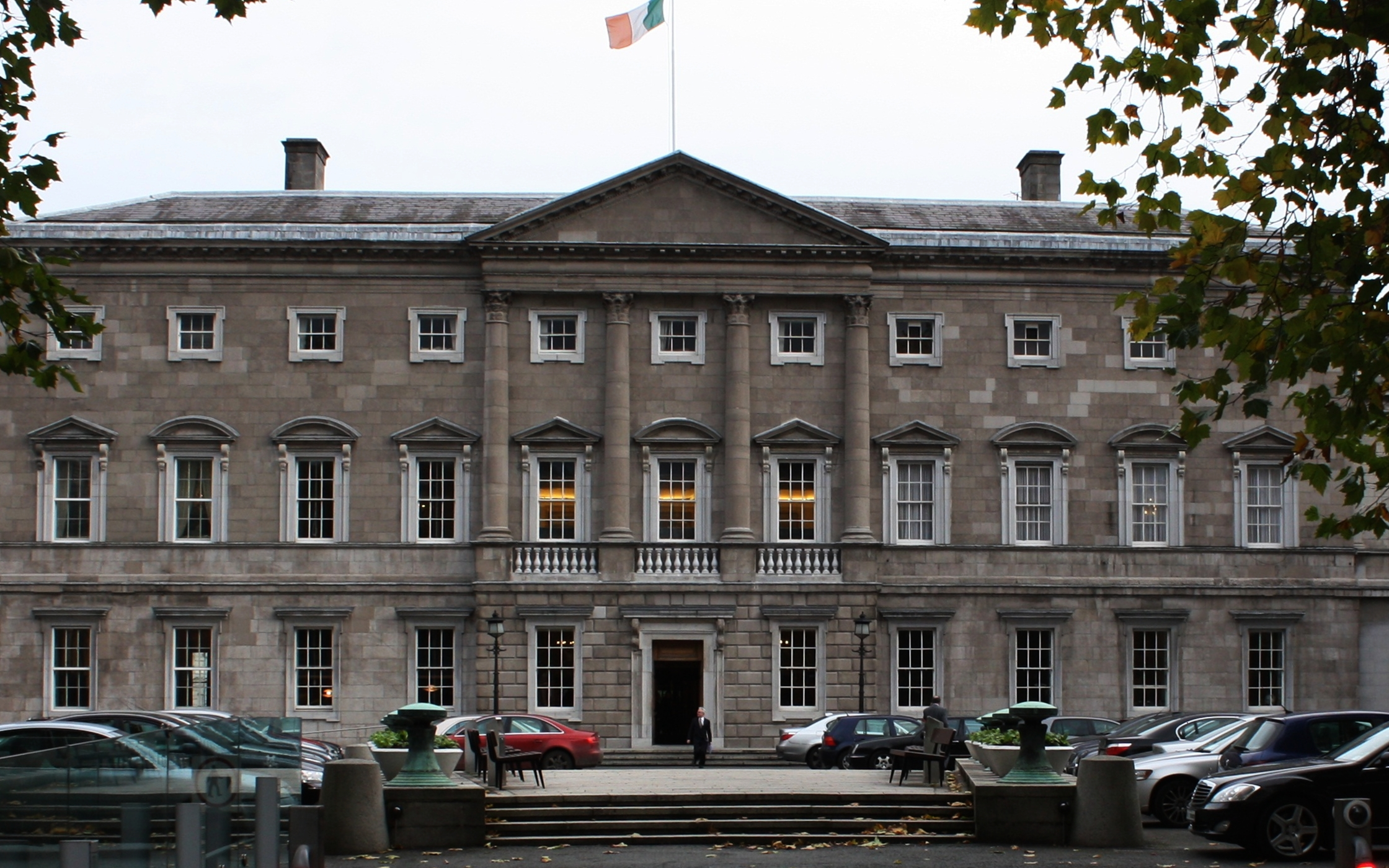
Leinster House, which houses Seanad Éireann

On 11 June 1969, it was announced in The Irish Times that Bourke was running as a candidate for the Seanad. She was first elected to one of the three Dublin University seats in Seanad Éireann as an Independent senator as part of the 12th Seanad, which first met on 5 November 1969. Elected on the second count, she was one of only six female senators, out of a total of 60. Bourke's stated goals as a senator were "to open up Ireland and separate Catholic teaching from aspects of the criminal law and therefore reform the law on contraceptives, legalise homosexuality and change the constitutional ban on divorce." Shortly after her election, she stated that the best way a woman could overcome prejudice against women was "not to emphasise that you are a woman, but to show that you can do a job efficiently and well".

As an independent senator, Bourke was initially unable to gather enough support to advance legislation, and devoted most of her time in the Seanad to proposing motions on matters she considered important, most of which were never discussed by the chamber.

In 1970, she wrote an article for The Irish Times, in which she criticised articles 2 and 3 of the Irish constitution as "an unnecessary assertion of jurisdiction", calling on Irish political parties to come to a solution on the so-called Northern problem. Her stance on Northern Ireland led to controversy in 1985.

=== Early attempts to legalise contraception ===
Robinson's first term as a senator was largely marked by repeated attempts to legalise the sale of contraception. The first draft legislation Robinson put to the floor in early 1971, with support from John Horgan and Trevor West, was to legalise the sale of contraception in Ireland. Though not the first Irish politician to raise the issue, she was the first to attempt to introduce legislation on the matter. On 26 February Robinson notified the Seanad that she had prepared a bill to amend the 1935 Criminal Law Act, which would repeal the section that totally banned the sale of contraception. Despite having three signatories on the bill, Robinson failed to gather the six necessary to force a vote on debating the issue, and it was not discussed in the Seanad. Public outcry, however, ensued, and Robinson began to receive hate mail and used contraceptives in the post. Her proposals were caused outrage among the Catholic Church, and she was denounced from the pulpit of Ballina Cathedral, which caused distress to her parents. In March, she presented an amended version of her bill, seeking for it to be printed and distributed. Tomás Ó Maoláin, the Leader of the House, rejected her proposal, describing her as behaving in a "schoolgirlish, irresponsible manner". On 31 March and again on 12 May, Robinson's amended proposals were again dismissed without debate.

A few days after this fourth rejection, the Irish Women's Liberation Movement held the well-publicised "Contraceptive Train" protest, in which members of the group took the train to Belfast, purchased large amounts of contraceptives, and loudly and publicly declared what they had purchased to customs agents. Facing increasing pressure from the public, in July 1971 the government announced that Robinson could proceed with the first stage of her bill in the Seanad. The government deliberately didn't give Robinson notice of this move, as if she was defeated, she would have to wait six months before she could raise the issue again, and under procedural rules, only she and a spokesman for the government could deliver a speech. Due to the short notice provided to her, Robinson informed the Seanad that she would make a "rather angry statement", in place of a more considered speech. She argued that the government's stated goal of ending partition was at odds with maintaining a "moral partition" of the island. Her proposal was ultimately defeated by 25 votes to 14. In February 1972, two Labour Party Teachta Dála introduced a bill in the Dáil aimed at reforming the laws surrounding contraception in Ireland. An indication of Robinson's growing political influence, this bill was identical to the one she had put forward the previous July. This too was defeated.

=== Other issues ===
Another topic which was a focus of Robinson's early terms in the Seanad was the issue of adoption rights vis-à-vis children born out of wedlock. At the time of Robinson's election to the Seanad, 'illegitimate children' (as they were then referred to in Irish law) could not be adopted by their parents after they married if the parents were of different religions. In the summer of 1971, a bill drafted by Robinson aimed at changing these laws was discussed in the Seanad.

Despite Robinson's opposition to the influence of the Catholic Church on Irish law and politics, she maintained a good relationship with certain groups within the Church. In January 1972, she was invited to take part in a working party set up by the Irish Theological Association, and became the first woman to do so (or, indeed, to even be invited). The working party's goal was to review the Irish Constitution. The party recommended removing the "special position" of the Catholic Church from the Constitution, changing the preamble to the constitution, removing the constitutional ban on divorce, amending the law on contraception, amending the laws on adoption, and changing the Catholic Church's regulations on mixed religion marriages. Robinson's influence can be clearly seen in these recommendations, as the laws prohibiting contraception and adoption were legislative, not constitutional. The party's report also found the constitution had "limited recognition of the rights of women".

In April 1972, Robinson called on all Irish politicians to remove all references to religion from both the Irish constitution and the Irish presidential oath. Shortly afterwards, at a meeting of the Dublin branch of Tuairim on the topic "Republic of Ireland: a Catholic state for a Catholic people", she stated that Ireland statistically had a pluralist society, but legally that was not the case.

A general election was called by the Taoiseach, Jack Lynch for 28 February 1973, two months before lowering of the legal voting age from 21 to 18 came into effect. Robinson served as counsel on behalf of a student who challenged the government's decision, arguing that it effectively disenfranchised 140,000 voters. Though Robinson lost her case, she received significant positive publicity as a result of her efforts. In March 1973, shortly after her re-election campaign began, Robinson's mother died.

== 13th Seanad (1973 – 1977) ==
Robinson's share of the vote increased in her second election, and she was elected on the first count, having exceeded the necessary quota of 1,213 votes.

On 1 January 1973, before the end of Robinson's first term in the Seanad, Ireland entered the European Economic Community (EEC). Two key goals of Robinson were thus met by proxy during her second term as a senator: as conditions of joining the EEC, Ireland was required to offer women in the public service equal pay to men, which came into effect in June 1973; and in July the marriage bar for women in the civil service was lifted. In 1973 Robinson first served on the Joint Committee on the Secondary Legislation of the European Communities — which she remained a member of until her retirement from the Seanad — and she was called to the bar of England and Wales, at Middle Temple.

=== Further attempts to legalise contraception ===
As a result of the election called by Lynch, his party lost control of the government and Fine Gael entered into a coalition government with the Labour Party. Robinson expected the liberal influence of Labour in government to enable her to achieve greater political success, though ultimately this didn't prove to be the case. In March 1974, she again introduced a bill to formally legalise the sale of contraceptives in Ireland. This bill was more conservative than the previous two bills she had drafted, but after Paddy Cooney, the Minister for Justice, announced that the government was proposing their own family planning bill, support for Robinson's bill faded and was ultimately defeated in a vote, 32 to 10. The government's proposed bill, which was more conservative again than Robinson's, was also defeated in a vote, in which to the surprise of many the Taoiseach voted against his own party's bill. This action by the Taoiseach led to Robinson quipping that "we need government planning even more than family planning", a remark that was widely publicised by the Irish press. Though Robinson would again attempt to raise the issue in December 1974, it didn't gain any traction and the issue wasn't broached again for the duration of the government.

=== Children born out of wedlock ===
In 1974, Robinson sought again to address the issue of the place of children born out of wedlock in Irish society. She was able to secure Seanad approval to print draft legislation, and delivered a speech to the members of the Seanad. Senator Michael D. Higgins participated in the debate, arguing that the bill didn't go far enough. The debate was eventually adjourned, but no further debate ever followed.

Robinson had more success in this area as a lawyer than as a politician: in May 1974 she represented a couple seeking to adopt, and succeeded in having one section of the 1952 Adoption Act deemed unconstitutional, though this was a niche issue which only affected a handful of people.

=== The right of women to sit on juries ===
During this period, Robinson also addressed one of the key areas of concern to her: the right of women to sit on juries. Though at the time women were in some circumstances legally permitted to serve on juries, the laws surrounding this were discriminatory: only ratepayers were permitted to serve on juries, which disenfranchised the working-class, and the law differentiated between male and female ratepayers. Where men could be compelled to attend jury service and could face legal repercussions for refusing, women could not be compelled, and had to apply to be put on the jury list. As a result of this barrier, only three women sat on a jury in Ireland between 1963 and 1973. In December 1975 the Supreme Court found in favour of Robinson's client, Mairín de Burca, and in March 1976 the government legislated the Juries Act 1976, which granted every Irish citizen between the age of 18 and 65 the right to sit on a jury.

Since 1969, Robinson had been an advocate for the establishment of Free Legal Advice Centres. In April 1975, FLAC were able to open their first clinic in Coolock.

=== Joining the Labour Party ===
In late July 1976, Robinson joined the Labour Party. Though already a member of the Oireachtas, this did not immediately qualify her to join the Parliamentary Labour Party (PLP) — one must apply, and be accepted, to join. Her application was largely ignored by members of the party until Michael D. Higgins moved for her acceptance. Between December 1976 and February 1977, Robinson attempted to convince the PLP to move the latest draft of her family planning bill to the Seanad, but to no avail. In March 1977, with the support of Conor Cruise O'Brien, the PLP came to an agreement that her bill could be introduced, debated, and voted on in the Seanad, provided that if it was carried, though a date would be set for its next discussion, it would never again be discussed for the duration of that Seanad.

In the period preceding the 1973 general election, Robinson pressured the PLP to pursue changes in adoption law and penal reform. On the issue of adoption, a group was established to meet with the Declan Costello, the Attorney General, but shortly after they approached him he was promoted, and his successor John Kelly didn't find time to meet with the group. A sub-committee was also formed to discuss legislating penal reform, but as the election drew nearer, this sub-committee never produced a report on the matter.

Robinson ran for election to Dáil Éireann (the lower house), but her efforts were unsuccessful. During her Seanad re-election campaign, she left the country to travel to Strasbourg, where she was representing Josie Airey in the European Court of Human Rights, where Robinson represented her. The court eventually ruled in Airey's favour in 1980, though Robinson leaving the country mid-campaign, combined with backlash to her joining the Labour Party, led to her only narrowly being re-elected to the Seanad.

== 14th Seanad (1977 – 1981) ==
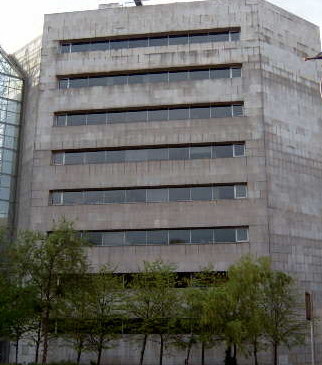
One of the Civic Offices (nicknamed the 'Bunkers') Dublin Corporation built at Wood Quay. Robinson gave legal support to the leaders of the unsuccessful campaign to save the site.

Robinson served as chairman of the Social Affairs sub-committee of the Joint Committee on the Secondary Legislation of the European Communities from 1977 to 1987.

=== Wood Quay protests ===
In her third term as senator, Robinson opposed the proposal by Dublin Corporation to construct new administrative headquarters on Wood Quay, one of Europe's best-preserved Viking sites. Wood Quay was first excavated in 1974, and in April 1975 Robinson and others raised the issue in the senate; they felt that the National Museum of Ireland were not taking the archaeological finds seriously. Robinson served as junior counsel to Donal Barrington, in one of many cases taken to court in an effort protect the site. The Labour Party was sympathetic to Robinson's cause, but were wary of antagonising a major trade union, the Local Government and Public Services Union. In September 1978, 500 members of the union had marched in support of the demolition. The party ultimately advocated for a compromise, whereby the offices would be redesigned and relocated to a part of the Wood Quay site which had already been bulldozed.

A two-day debate on the issue was held on the 6 and 7 December, where a proposal by senator Gus Martin, that would have preserved the entirety of the site, was defeated by a single vote, 21 in favour to 20 against. Robinson did not vote, though if she had the motion still would have failed due to the chairman's casting vote. The Labour Party compromise was then put forward, though this was also defeated by a single vote, 19 in favour to 20 against. On 30 March 1979 Robinson was selected as a candidate for Dublin Corporation, and she was elected as a councillor that June. Despite the fact that following the election 24 out of 45 seats were now occupied by councillors who were against the Wood Quay development, as councillors have little power to direct council activities, they were ultimately unable to change the plans. Despite their efforts, Wood Quay was bulldozed and concreted over in 1984, and the controversial Civic Offices were built. Robinson served as a councillor until 1983.

=== Other issues ===
In 1979, the Family Planning Act was passed, legalising the sale of barrier contraceptives. The bill was put forward by Charles Haughey, and was far more conservative than any of Robinson's proposals. The bill allowed married couples who needed barrier contraception in place of hormonal contraception, which was already available on prescription. Couples would be able to obtain a prescription for barrier contraception from their doctor, and purchase it at a pharmacy. The Labour Party, supportive of Robinson's proposal, voted against all aspects of the government legislation.

In 1980, Robinson was called to the Inner Bar of King's Inns, making her a senior counsel in Ireland. On 14 April 1980, the Divorce Action Group was founded. Though Robinson was not a member of the group, within days of its foundation she presented them with a draft bill to amend section 41.3.2. of the Irish constitution, in order to legalise divorce, though nothing else would materialise on the issue for the duration of this Seanad's life.

In April 1981, Robinson became the first university senator to be expelled from the Seanad for disorderly behaviour, after instigating a heated argument after a female senate usher was transferred to other duties. In 1981, she launched a second unsuccessful campaign to be elected to Dáil Éireann. On 30 June, the Labour Party again entered into a coalition government with Fine Gael. In September 1981, Robinson announced that she would not run for the Dáil in future.

== 15th Seanad (1981 – 1982) ==
Robinson was returned to the Seanad on the sixth count in the 1981 election, being one of two candidates to meet the minimum quota of votes necessary to ensure a seat. The government, which was elected in June 1981, was short-lived, and the Seanad (which meets for the first time after the Dáil) was even more so: they first sat in October 1981, and were dissolved in February 1982. During this period, Robinson began to become uncomfortable with her position as a member of the Labour Party, as she didn't agree with some of the issues being raised by the coalition government of Fine Gael and the Labour Party. In November 1981, she threatened to vote against the government on the issue of raising the school-going age to four-and-a-half years old: Robinson believed that without a government commitment to funding pre-school education, the measure would reduce equality of educational opportunity for those from deprived backgrounds. In January 1982, Robinson resigned her position on Dublin Corporation.

Following mounting pressure from anti-abortion organisations, a constitutional ban on abortion was proposed in 1981, in advance of the upcoming election. The two major parties, Fianna Fáil and Fine Gael, both promised that if they were elected, they would work towards the banning of abortion. Alongside fellow senator Catherine McGuinness and Anne O'Donnell of the Rape Crisis Centre, Robinson formalised the foundation of a national campaign against constitutionally banning abortion, known as the Anti-Amendment Campaign, in April 1982.

== 16th Seanad (1982 – 1983) ==
[The referendum] has become a litmus test for the kind of society we are going to have in Ireland in the eighties. If the referendum goes ahead it will confirm the worst fears about those who are concerned about the influence of the majority Church on legal and social developments in the state. If it is dropped, it will signal that we have taken a significant step in the direction of a pluralist and tolerant society.

— Mary Robinson, in John Horgan, Mary Robinson: An Independent Voice (1997), p.104

Robinson was returned to the 16th Seanad, which first sat in May 1982. By June 1982, the Anti-Amendment Campaign had 14 different groups affiliated with it. After the publication of the government's wording of the proposed amendment on 2 November 1982, Robinson was among the first to criticise its ambiguity, informing the Parliamentary Labour Party that it may go as far as to call into question the legality of the 1861 Act.

== 17th Seanad (1983 – 1987) ==
"I have paid a high price for my involvement in the Labour Party in giving up my independence, and I could go back to it."

— Robinson speaking in 1984.

Between 1983 and 1985, Robinson served as a member of the Joint Committee on Marital Breakdown.

In response to the government's proposition vis-a-vis the abortion amendment, on 4 May 1983 Robinson delivered a two-and-a-half hour long speech in the Seanad, condemning the bill. The speech has been noted by some of her biographers as being one of the most emotive of her career, and was described by The Irish Times as "a remarkable performance". On 7 September 1983, a referendum on the topic of abortion, concerning an amendment to ban the practice of abortion, was passed, and the Eighth amendment to the Irish constitution was written into law. Robinson made three predictions regarding the wording of the amendment: that it would be used to prevent women from travelling abroad to seek an abortion, that it could violate Irish commitments made under the European Convention for the Protection of Human Rights and Fundamental Freedoms, and that the ambiguities within the bill would actually open the door to abortion in certain circumstances. In all cases, she would later be proven correct.

In 1984, Spring promoted John Rogers to the role of Attorney General of Ireland, a position many in both parties of the power-sharing government thought would go to Robinson. This was described by one of her biographers as "one of the most bitter disappointments of Mary Robinson's public career", and had a strong impact on her already fractitious relationship with Spring and the Labour Party generally. In May 1985, she said that she "would find it difficult to go out to canvass a group of young people to join the Labour Party. I would have to be defensive and complicated". Though Robinson officially resigned from the Labour Party in protest at the exclusion Unionists from consultation when drafting the Anglo-Irish Agreement that the coalition led by Taoiseach Garret FitzGerald had signed with the British government, many consider the promotion of Rogers to have influenced her decision. Robinson officially left the Labour Party in 1985.

On 25 June 1986, a referendum was held on the legalisation of divorce. Though the pro-divorce position led the polls for almost the entirety of the campaign, in the week preceding the election support began to decline, and the referendum ultimately failed to pass, with only 36% of votes in favour of legalisation, and 63% against.

== 18th Seanad (1987 – 1989 ==
For the duration of her final term of office, Robinson served as chairman of the Legal Affairs Committee. In March 1988, Robinson successfully tabled an amendment to the Adoption Bill 1987, which ended what the historian Michael O'Sullivan refers to as "the rather embarrassing practice" of publicly publishing the names and addresses of all adopted children and their adoptive parents. In a compendium of Irish women released in 1988, Robinson was described as "Ireland's best known woman politician".

On 23 May 1989, Robinson announced that she would not be seeking re-election, as she felt her commitment to the Irish Centre for European Law, which she and her husband managed at Trinity College, did not allow her to give her full commitment to the Seanad. At this point many of the issues she had campaigned for had been tackled: contraception had been legalised (although heavily restricted), women were on juries, and the marriage bar on women in the civil service had been revoked. On 5 July 1989, Robinson ended her Seanad career. The government had decided to pass two important pieces of legislation on the same day: the Building Societies Bill, and the Central Bank Bill. In protest, Fine Gael and Independent senators withdrew from the chamber. Before she left, Robinson said that she "regretted that the Government's decision would deprive her of an opportunity to speak on what she said would probably be her last day in the Senate in 20 years."

== See also ==
- Elections in the Republic of Ireland
