= Legal career of Mary Robinson =

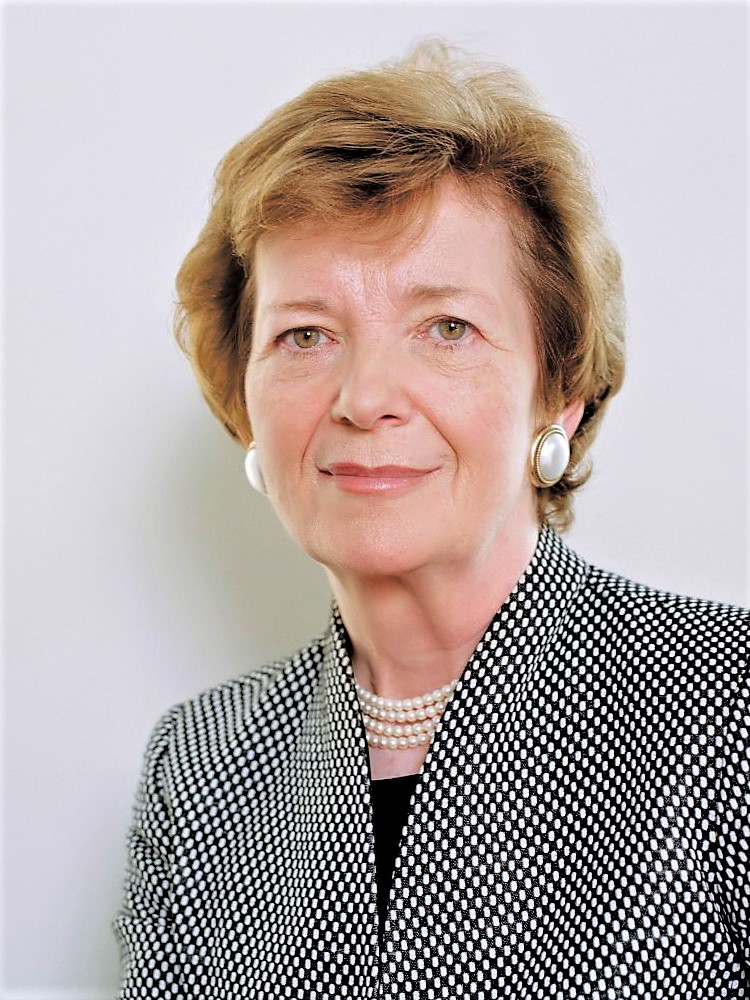
Mary Robinson in 2014

The legal career of Mary Robinson (Irish: Máire Mhic Róibín; née Bourke), which occurred prior to her becoming President of Ireland in 1990 (and was largely concurrent with her time in the Irish Senate), lasted over 22 years. Made a barrister in 1967, Robinson specialised in constitutional, criminal, and European community law.

Robinson served as counsel in several landmark cases in Ireland, which established the right of women to sit on juries, that the Irish state had a responsibility to provide legal aid in civil cases, and that the Irish state was in breach of human rights law by criminalising homosexual relations.

== Background and education ==
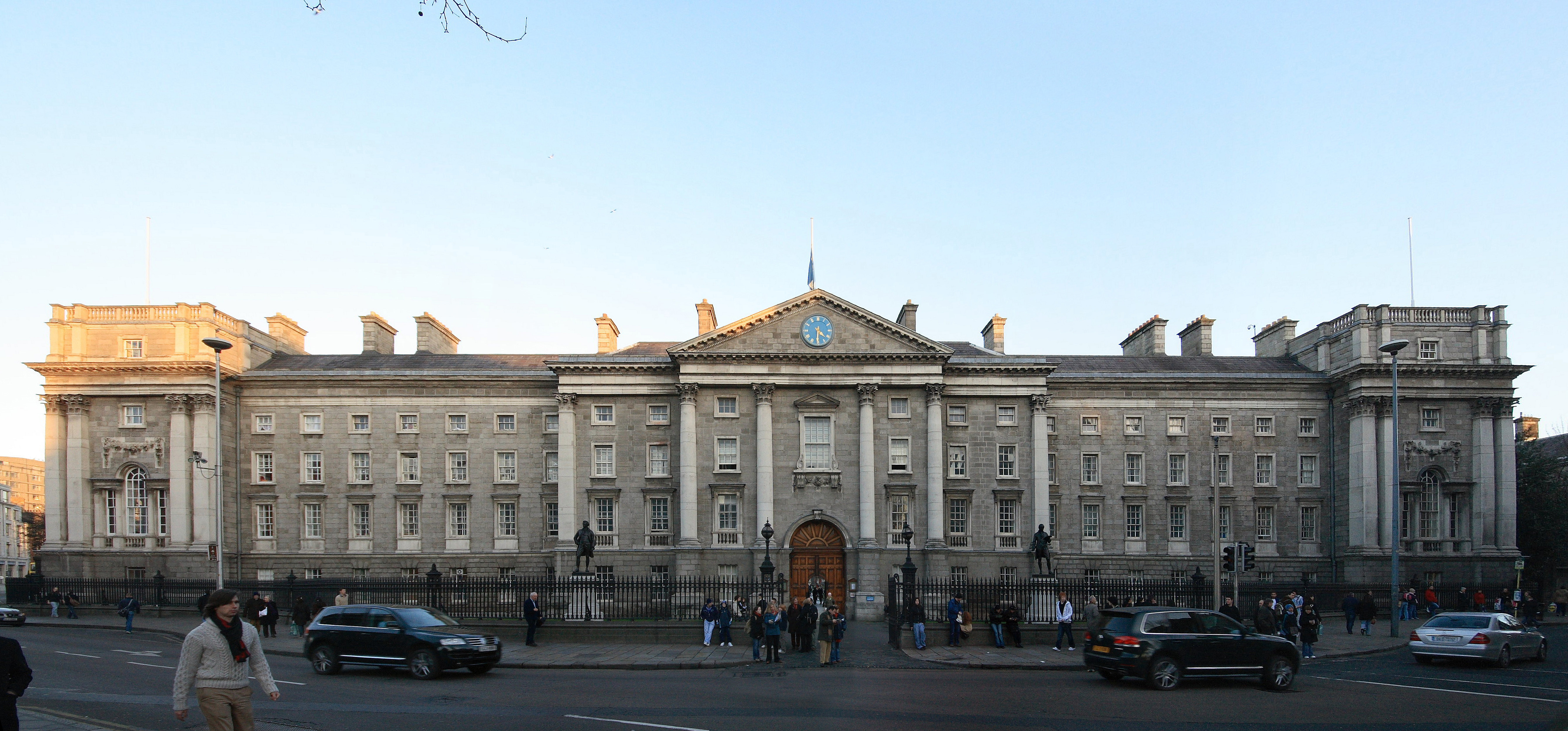
Trinity College Dublin

Bourke was first educated at Mount Anville Secondary School in Dublin between 1954 and 1961, followed by a year at a finishing school in Paris in 1962. In 1963 she was awarded a scholarship to study at Trinity College Dublin, where all of her four brothers had also been educated. At the time, an episcopal ban on Catholics attending the Protestant university meant that Bourke's parents had to first request permission from a bishop before their children could attend the college. The Bourkes bought a house at 21 Westland Row to serve as accommodation for their children while they studied at Trinity. This house, which would later serve as Bourke's base of operations during her first Seanad election campaign, was also the birthplace of Oscar Wilde. In 1965, Bourke won a scholarship to attend Trinity's Law School.

While attending law school, Bourke met Nicholas Robinson, her future husband. In the winter of 1965, Bourke was co-editor of the Irish Student Law Review. In 1967, Bourke was named auditor of the Law Society of Dublin; that year, she graduated with a B.A. and an LL.B. and was awarded first-class honours in both. She furthered her education at the King's Inns. She was then awarded a scholarship to Harvard Law School, where she studied between 1967 and 1968, and graduated with an LL.M. Robinson would later credit her time at Harvard as being extremely influential on her viewpoint on both society and the law. According to Robinson, it was at Harvard that she "learned that law is an instrument for social change".

== Legal and academic career ==
Robinson was called to the Irish bar in 1967. Two years later, shortly after announcing her bid for a seat in the Dublin University constituency in Seanad Éireann, Robinson was appointed Reid Professor of Criminal and Constitutional Law at Trinity, then a part-time position that was not particularly well paid. At the time of her appointment, she was 25 years old, making her the youngest law professor to have been appointed at Trinity College. In 1973, Robinson was called to the English bar at Middle Temple. The following year, Robinson undertook an examination of the Special Criminal Court, which she concluded by making five recommendations, one of which being that the Irish government undertake a review of the justification for and operations of that court. Robinson left the professorial post in 1975, and it was subsequently made into a full-time position.

In 1980, writing for Fortnight, she revisited the issue of the Special Criminal Court and branded government inaction in the intervening six years as a "scandal". From then until 1990, when she was elected president, Robinson lectured in Trinity in European community law. In 1988, alongside her husband, she co-founded the Irish Centre for European Law, a subsidiary of Trinity College.

Robinson was made a senior counsel in Ireland in 1980; in the years that followed, she was elected to the Royal Irish Academy. From 1984, she served on the Advisory Commission of Interights, an international legal human rights NGO that was based in London. In 1987, she was elected to the International Commission of Jurists in Geneva. Disappointingly for Robinson, in 1984, Dick Spring recommended the appointment of John Rogers as Attorney General of Ireland. A position widely expected to be offered to Robinson, not receiving the appointment has been described by one of her biographers as "one of the most bitter disappointments of Mary Robinson's public career". That same year Robinson was made a member of the editorial board of the Irish Current Law Statutes Annotated. Robinson retired from practicing law in February 1990, when she was approached by the Labour Party to run as their candidate to the presidency of Ireland.

== Notable cases ==
=== McGee v Attorney General ===
Much of Robinson's legal career dealt with matters concerning personal and unenumerated rights, such as the right to privacy. In 1972, a case was brought against the Irish state by Mary McGee after customs officials seized contraceptive jelly which she had ordered from the United Kingdom. Though hormonal contraception was legal in Ireland at the time (though only upon prescription), McGee suffered from a medical condition which meant that she could not make use of hormonal contraception. Robinson and Donal Barrington represented McGee. In December 1973, the Supreme Court ruled in McGee's favour, stating that "the Family" had an inalienable right to privacy and that customs officials had breached this right by intercepting and confiscating their post. While this case enabled Irish people to import contraceptives to the country, their sale and advertisement remained illegal.

=== De Búrca and Anderson v Attorney General ===
In 1975, Máirín de Búrca and Mary Anderson—with Robinson and Barrington serving as their representation—challenged the Juries Act 1927, which they believed was discriminatory towards both women and the working class. Though at the time women were in some circumstances legally permitted to serve on juries, the laws surrounding this were discriminatory: only ratepayers were permitted to serve on juries, which disenfranchised the working-class, and the law differentiated between male and female ratepayers. Where men could be compelled to attend jury service and could face legal repercussions for refusing, women could not be compelled and had to apply to be put on the jury list. As a result of this barrier, only three women sat on a jury between 1963 and 1973. Though the High Court rejected their challenge, in December 1975 the Supreme Court ruled in their favour. The enactment of the Juries Act 1976 permitted every Irish citizen between the age of 18 and 65 the right to sit on a jury.

=== Airey v Ireland ===
In 1973, Josie Airey applied to the European Commission of Human Rights in Strasbourg, arguing that by not providing her with legal aid in a civil case, Ireland was in breach of the European Convention on Human Rights. In July 1977, Airey's case was accepted by the commission, who granted Airey legal aid, and Robinson served as counsel. Airey's husband had been convicted of assaulting her in January 1972, following eight years of Airey unsuccessfully pursuing judicial separation. Her husband refused to sign the documents, and Airey was unable to take legal action against him as she was unable to afford the associated legal costs; at this time, the Irish state only granted legal aid in criminal cases. Having initially unsuccessfully pursued the case through the Irish courts, the European Court of Human Rights ruled in Airey's favour in 1979, and Ireland has provided legal aid in civil cases since.

=== Right to privacy and decriminalisation of homosexuality ===
In Kennedy v Ireland, which concluded in 1987, Robinson successfully argued on behalf of husband and wife Arnold and Mavis Kennedy that the Irish state tapping the phones of journalists infringed upon the journalists' rights to privacy. The couple were awarded a total of IR£30,000 between them.

In Norris v. Attorney General, Robinson (a member of the Campaign for Homosexual Law Reform) unsuccessfully argued that laws which criminalised homosexuality were unconstitutional, as they failed to defend David Norris' right to privacy. In 1983, by a 3–2 majority, the Supreme Court dismissed Norris's claim. Chief Justice Tom O'Higgins, in delivering the judgment, stated that "On the grounds of the Christian nature of our State and on the grounds that the deliberate practice of homosexuality is morally wrong, that it is damaging to the health both of individuals and the public, and finally that it is potentially harmful to the institution of marriage, I can find no inconsistency with the Constitution in the laws which make such conduct criminal."

Norris then applied to the European Court of Human Rights, where Robinson argued that the Supreme Court's decision was in contravention of Article 8 of the Convention for the Protection of Human Rights and Fundamental Freedoms, which provides a right to private life, including sexual life. In Norris v. Ireland (1988), the court ruled in Norris's favour. In 1993, in her role as president, Robinson signed the Criminal Law (Sexual Offences) Act into law, decriminalising homosexual relations.
