= Josie Airey =

Irish legal-aid activist (1932–2002)

- Born: Johanna Lynch; 4 May 1932; Cork, Ireland
- Died: 26 August 2002 (aged 70); Marymount Hospital, Cork

Josie Airey (4 May 1932 – 26 August 2002) was an Irish legal-aid campaigner who won a case at the European Court of Human Rights over the right for access to free legal aid in Ireland.

== Early life and family ==
Josie Airey was born Johanna Lynch at 154 Bandon Road, Cork on 4 May 1932. Her parents were Michael, labourer, and Eileen Lynch (née Sullivan). She had one sister and two brothers. Both of Airey's parents died young, so Airey and her siblings were raised by her grandmother in the south city Lough area of Cork. She attended the Mercy convent school, St Marie of the Isle. She left school early to start work in retail, including at the English Market at a meat stall.

She married Timothy Airey in 1953 at age 21. She had one son, Thomas, and three daughters, Elaine, Jean, and Noreen. The marriage became strained, Airey stating the marriage deteriorated due to her husband's abusive and drunken behaviour while she worked as a hospital cleaner. In 1972, her husband was fined for assaulting her and later abandoned her. Airey brought him to court seeking maintenance. She sought a marital separation, but her husband refused to sign the deed. She was not able to afford a high court separation order, as she had no access to civil legal aid as it only existed for criminal law cases.

== Activism ==
Airey rose to prominence when she unsuccessfully petitioned the Fianna Fáil government, the main opposition parties, and Cardinal William Conway to redress a judicial trap in which she and many others also would find themselves. Despite the set back, she persisted with support from Eileen Desmond. She presented her case to the European Commission of Human Rights in Strasbourg in 1973. After the Irish state's position was established, the commission provided Airey with legal aid. Brendan Walsh, a Dublin solicitor, offered to take the case, and Airey chose Mary Robinson as counsel.

The case opened in Strasbourg on 7 July 1977, with Airey focusing on the relevant articles in the 1950 European Convention on Human Rights such as article 6 for a "fair and public hearing", which she and others could not avail of in Ireland due to the expense of high court proceedings. Strasbourg deemed her case reasonable, and set to examine further. The Irish state did not use the opportunity to review the law, with the Commission deciding that Ireland was in breach of the Convention on human rights in March 1978. The Commission rejected the Irish state's claim that Airey could have received the same services in Ireland that she received in Strasbourg.

While awaiting a judicial ruling, in May 1978 Airey remarked that Ireland had brought Britain to the commission over mistreatment of prisoners in Northern Ireland while torturing her for years. On 22 February 1979 the European Court of Human Rights sat with the Irish government maintaining its rejection of her case, but announcing it would begin providing legal aid in family law. The Irish state had effectively admitted it was wrong, without an official admission of guilt for breaching articles 6 and 8 of the convention. Airey's judicial separation was granted in the high court, with her receiving costs and damages from the state. In December 1979, the Irish state established a legal aid board.

== Later life ==
Airey reverted to Lynch, and returned to a normal life after the landmark case. She lived at Bandon Road in Cork, and worked at the local Ferrero chocolate factory. From the 1980s her health declined, and she lived at Marymount Hospital in Cork. She died on 26 August 2002, and is buried at St Joseph's cemetery.
