= Mary Robinson =

President of Ireland from 1990 to 1997

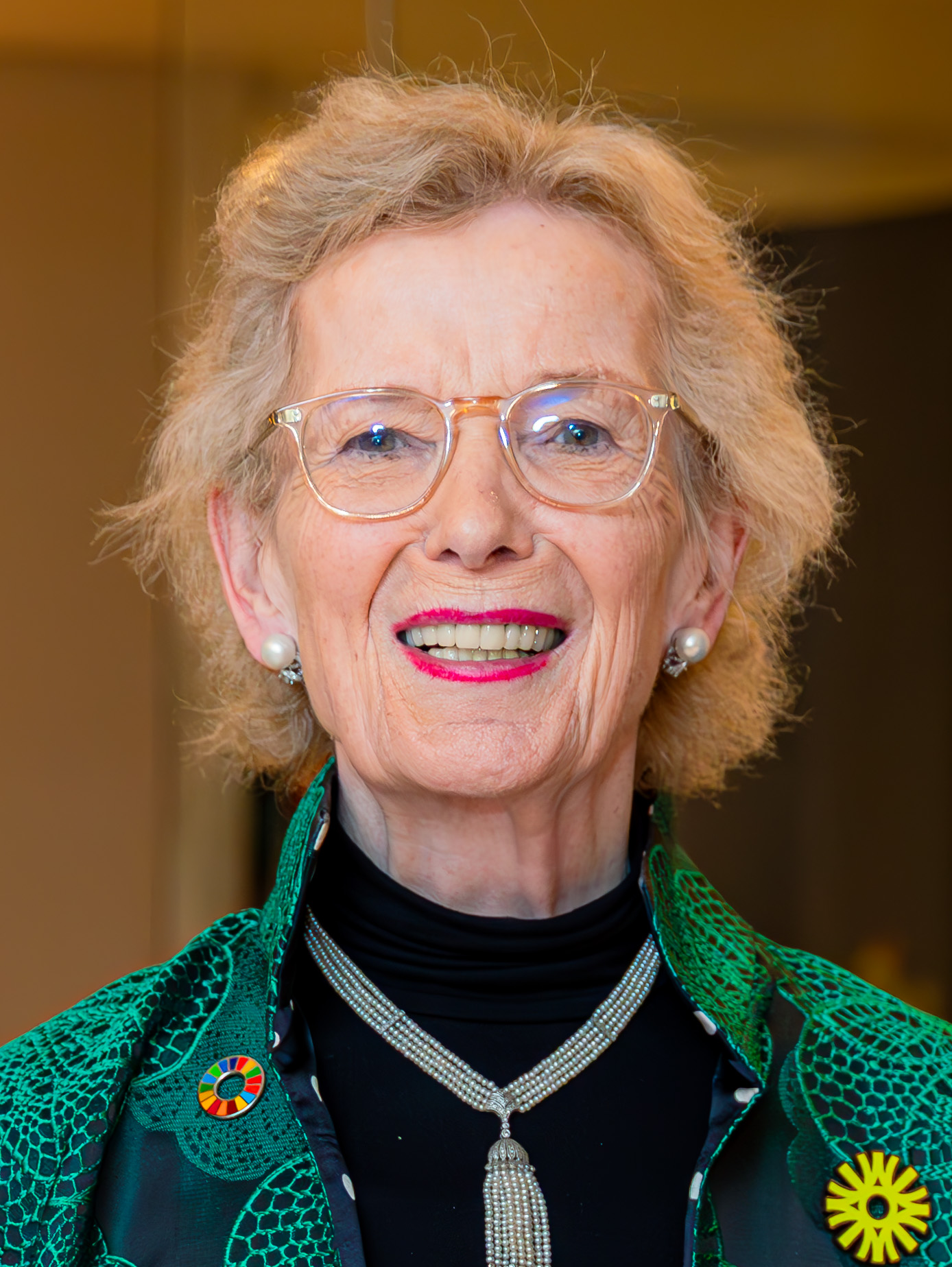
- Robinson in 2024

President of Ireland
- In office 3 December 1990 – 12 September 1997
- Taoiseach: Charles Haughey; Albert Reynolds; John Bruton; Bertie Ahern
- Preceded by: Patrick Hillery
- Succeeded by: Mary McAleese

United Nations High Commissioner for Human Rights
- In office 12 September 1997 – 12 September 2002
- Secretary-General: Kofi Annan
- Preceded by: José Ayala Lasso
- Succeeded by: Sérgio Vieira de Mello

Senator
- In office 5 November 1969 – 5 July 1989
- Constituency: Dublin University

Personal details
- Born: Mary Therese Winifred Bourke; 21 May 1944 (age 82) Ballina, County Mayo, Ireland
- Party: Independent (before 1977, 1985–present)
- Other political affiliations: Labour Party (1977–1985)
- Spouse: Nicholas Robinson (m. 1970)
- Children: 3
- Education: Trinity College Dublin; Harvard University; King's Inns
- Profession: Barrister; politician; diplomat
- Awards: Otto Hahn Peace Medal (2003); Calderone Prize (2005); Princess of Asturias Award (2006); Presidential Medal of Freedom (2009); Knight of Freedom Award (2017); Kew International Medal (2018); Tang Prize (2024)
- Mary Robinson's voice From the BBC programme Desert Island Discs; Recorded 28 July 2013

Mary Therese Winifred Robinson (née Bourke; born 21 May 1944) is an Irish politician who served as the president of Ireland from December 1990 to September 1997. She was the country's first female president. Robinson had previously served as a senator in Seanad Éireann from 1969 to 1989, and as a councillor on Dublin Corporation from 1979 to 1983. Although she had been briefly affiliated with the Labour Party during her time as a senator, she became the first independent candidate to win the presidency and the first not to have had the support of Fianna Fáil. Following her time as president, Robinson became the United Nations High Commissioner for Human Rights from 1997 to 2002.

During her tenure as High Commissioner, she visited Tibet in 1998 (the first holder of the office to do so) and criticised Ireland's immigration policy and the use of capital punishment in the United States. She extended her intended single four-year term as High Commissioner by one year to preside over the World Conference against Racism 2001 in Durban, South Africa; the conference proved controversial due to a draft document which equated Zionism with racism. Robinson resigned her post in September 2002. After leaving the United Nations, Robinson formed Realizing Rights: the Ethical Globalization Initiative, which came to a planned end at the end of 2010.

Robinson also served as Chancellor of the University of Dublin from 1998 until 2019, and as Oxfam's honorary president from 2002 until she stepped down in 2012. She returned to live in Ireland at the end of 2010 and has since founded The Mary Robinson Foundation – Climate Justice. Robinson continues to campaign globally on issues of civil rights. She has been the honorary president of the European Inter-University Centre for Human Rights and Democratisation (EIUC) since 2005. She is a former Chair of the International Institute for Environment and Development (IIED) and is also a founding member and chair of the Council of Women World Leaders. She was a member of the European members of the Trilateral Commission.

Robinson's presidency is regarded as having a transformative effect on Ireland. Having successfully campaigned on several liberalising issues as a senator and a lawyer, Robinson was a key figure in the decriminalisation of homosexuality in 1993, the legalisation of contraception and divorce, enabling women to sit on juries and securing the right to legal aid in civil legal cases in Ireland. Regularly polling approval ratings above 90%, approval of Robinson peaked at 93% among the Irish public, the highest rating of any Irish president.

== Early life and background (1944–1969) ==
Born in Ballina, County Mayo in 1944, she is the daughter of two medical doctors. Her father was Aubrey Bourke, of Ballina, while her mother was Tessa Bourke (née O'Donnell) from Carndonagh in Inishowen, County Donegal. Mary was raised, along with her brothers, at Victoria House (Numbers 1 and 2 Victoria Terrace), her parents' residence in the centre of Ballina. Her family had links with many diverse political strands in Ireland. One ancestor was a leading activist in the Irish National Land League of Mayo and the Irish Republican Brotherhood (IRB); an uncle, Sir Paget John Bourke, was knighted by Queen Elizabeth II after a career as a judge in the Colonial Service; while another relative was a Catholic nun. Some branches of the family were members of the Anglican Church of Ireland while others were Catholics. More distant relatives included William Liath de Burgh, Tibbot MacWalter Kittagh Bourke, and Charles Bourke.

She attended Mount Anville Secondary School in Dublin and studied law at Trinity College Dublin (where she was elected a scholar in 1965). As the Irish Catholic Church's ban on Catholics attending Trinity was still in place at the time of Bourke's application, her parents had to first request permission from Archbishop McQuaid to allow her to attend. She was one of three women in her class in Trinity, and graduated in 1967 with first-class honours. An outspoken critic of some Catholic church teachings, during her inaugural address as auditor of the Dublin University Law Society in 1967 she advocated removing the prohibition of divorce from the Irish Constitution, eliminating the ban on the use of contraceptives, and decriminalizing homosexuality and suicide. She furthered her studies at the King's Inns and was called to the Irish Bar in 1967. She was awarded a fellowship to attend Harvard Law School, receiving an LL.M in 1968.

== Legal career and time in Seanad Éireann (1967–1990) ==
In 1969, aged 25, Bourke was appointed Reid Professor of Criminal Law at Trinity College. That same year, Bourke was first elected to Seanad Éireann as an independent senator. Her goals as a senator were "to open up Ireland and separate Catholic teaching from aspects of the criminal law and therefore reform the law on contraceptives, legalise homosexuality and change the constitutional ban on divorce." Her time in office is most closely associated with these issues, as well as securing the right for women to serve on juries and her involvement with the Wood Quay protests.

In 1970, she married Nicholas Robinson, with whom she had a relationship since they were law students and who was then practising as a solicitor. They have three children together.

A result of Ireland joining the European Economic Community was that two of Robinson's key goals were met: Ireland was required to offer women in the public service equal pay to men, which came into effect in June 1973; and in July the marriage bar for women in the civil service was lifted.

In late July 1976, Robinson joined the Labour Party, though she later left the party in 1985. Whilst a member of the party, she ran for Dáil Éireann, including the 1981 general election for Dublin West, but failed to win a seat.

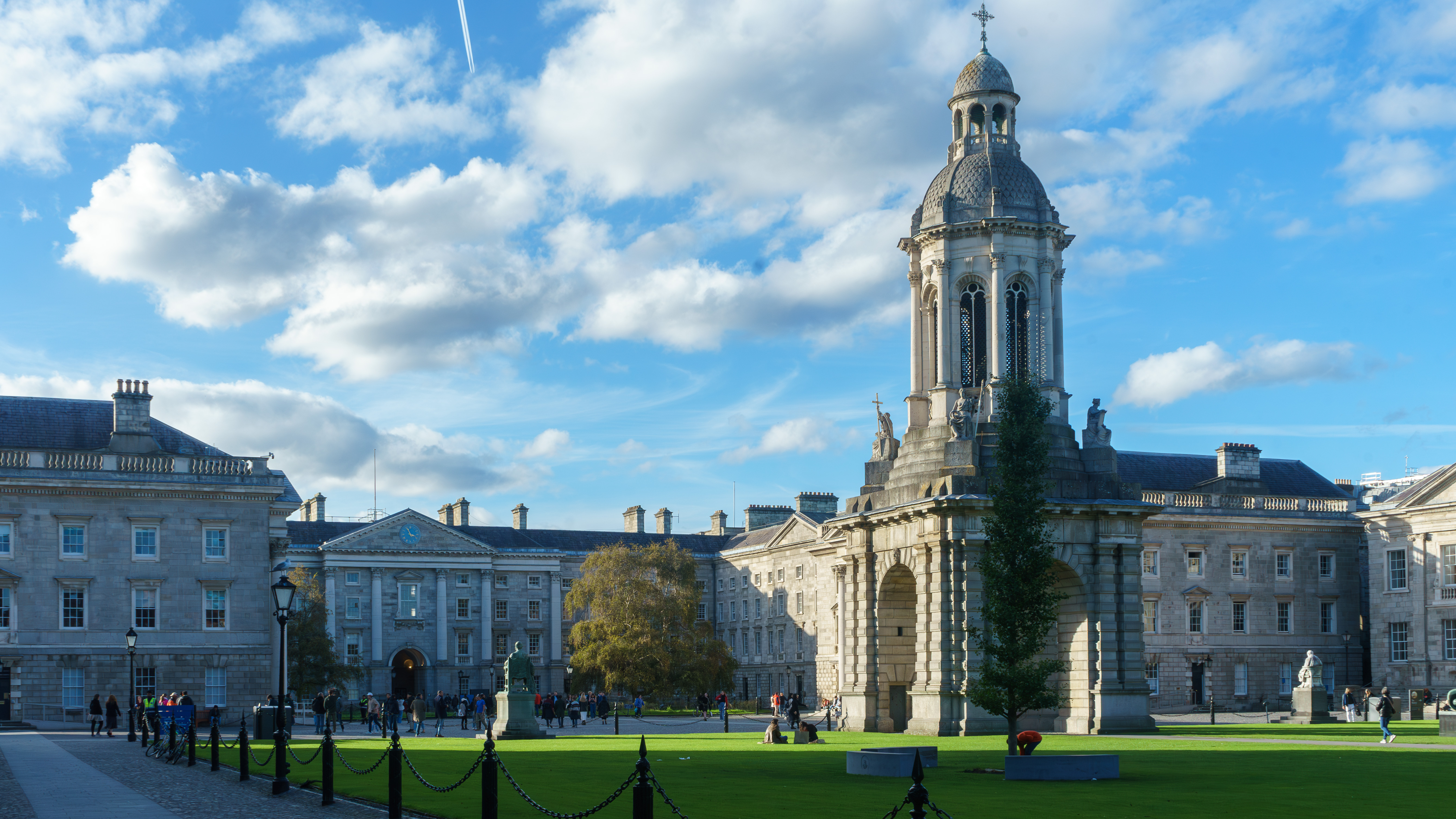
Trinity College Dublin. Robinson served as Reid Professor of Law in the university, as well as being one of its three elected senators in Seanad Éireann for twenty years.

During her time in office, Robinson won several landmark court cases. She first fought a gender-based case in the Labour Court on behalf of her husband. Under the pension scheme in place for politicians at the time, the widows of politicians were often entitled to pensions, but widowers were not. On 12 May 1979, the court ruled in her favour. In July 1979, she appeared in court on behalf of a couple who alleged that the Irish tax system was discriminatory as the tax allowances available to couples were less than double those available to single people. A court decision in their favour was made in October but was appealed by the Irish government. The Supreme Court eventually ruled in favour of the couple in April 1980. Robinson also lost a groundbreaking case in the European Court of Justice, the first case in which the court granted legal aid to a plaintiff.

On 23 May 1989, Robinson announced that she would not be seeking re-election, ending her career on the dissolution of the Seanad on 5 July 1989.

== Presidential campaign ==
=== Background ===
Robinson won the Labour Party nomination over former Minister for Health Noel Browne by a 4:1 majority. She had the advantage of being the first candidate nominated for the election (and the first female), in that she could cover more meetings, public addresses and interviews. However, she refused to be drawn on specifics in case she would alienate possible support. She also received the backing of The Irish Times newspaper, and this proved hugely advantageous.

=== Candidates from other parties ===
Robinson ran against two other candidates: Austin Currie, for Fine Gael, and Brian Lenihan for Fianna Fáil. Currie was widely seen as Fine Gael's last choice as a candidate, nominated only when no one else was available. Fianna Fáil's candidate, then Tánaiste and Minister for Defence Brian Lenihan had become popular during his three decades in politics. Like Robinson, he had delivered liberal policy reform.

At the beginning of the campaign, Lenihan was seen as the favourite to win the presidency. As the campaign proceeded, however, it became apparent that Robinson was a serious contender. Crucial to her appeal was the deep unpopularity of the Taoiseach, Charles Haughey, and the rising popularity of Dick Spring.

Robinson obtained the backing of the Workers' Party which was strong in Dublin and Cork and was considered crucial to getting working-class votes.

A transfer pact was agreed upon between Fine Gael and Labour, as both parties were normally preferred partners for each other in general elections.

=== Lenihan controversy ===
During the campaign it emerged that what Lenihan had told friends and insiders in private flatly contradicted his public statements on a controversial effort in 1982 by the opposition Fianna Fáil to pressure President Hillery into refusing a parliamentary dissolution to Garret FitzGerald, the Taoiseach at the time; Hillery had resolutely rejected the pressure.

Lenihan denied he had pressured the President but then a tape was produced of an interview he had given to a postgraduate student the previous May, in which he frankly discussed attempting to apply pressure. Lenihan claimed that "on mature recollection" he hadn't pressured the President and had been confused in his interview with the student. The issue, however, nearly led to the collapse of the government.

Under pressure from the junior coalition partner, the Progressive Democrats, Haughey sacked Lenihan as Tánaiste and Minister for Defence. Lenihan's integrity was seriously questioned. Lenihan's role in the event in 1982 seemed to imply that he could be instructed by Haughey in his duties, and that electing Lenihan was in effect empowering the controversial Haughey. In an effort to weaken Robinson, a government minister and Haughey ally, Pádraig Flynn, launched a controversial personal attack on Mary Robinson "as a wife and mother" and "having a new-found interest in her family". Flynn, even more controversially, also joked privately that Robinson would "turn the Áras [President's residence] into the Red Cow Inn [a pub in Dublin]". Flynn's tirade was itself attacked in response as "disgraceful" on radio by Michael McDowell, a senior member of the Progressive Democrat party which up to that point supported Lenihan's campaign. When Robinson met McDowell later in a restaurant, she quipped, "with enemies like McDowell, who needs friends?" Flynn's attack was a fatal blow to Lenihan's campaign, causing many female supporters of Lenihan to vote for Robinson in a gesture of support.

Lenihan's support evaporated, and Haughey concluded that the election was as good as lost. Haughey distanced himself from Lenihan and sacked him from the Cabinet. This had unintended consequences, as disquiet within the Fianna Fáil organisation concerning Haughey's leadership increased dramatically. Many canvassers now restarted the campaign to get Lenihan elected. However, Lenihan's personal confidence was shattered and although he recovered somewhat in the polls towards the end of the campaign, it was insufficient. He was ahead on the first count with 44% of the first-preference votes — Robinson attaining 39%. However, transfers from Currie proved critical and the majority of these went — as expected — against Fianna Fáil. Lenihan became the first Fianna Fáil presidential candidate to lose a presidential election. Robinson became president, the first woman to hold the office, and the first candidate to be second on first preference votes to win the presidency.

She became the first Labour Party candidate, the first woman, and the first non-Fianna-Fáil candidate in a contested presidential election to win the presidency. RTÉ broadcast her victory speech live rather than The Angelus. Her first television interview as President-elect was on the RTÉ children's television show The Den with Ray D'Arcy, puppets Zig and Zag and Dustin the Turkey, another puppet.

== Presidency (1990–1997) ==
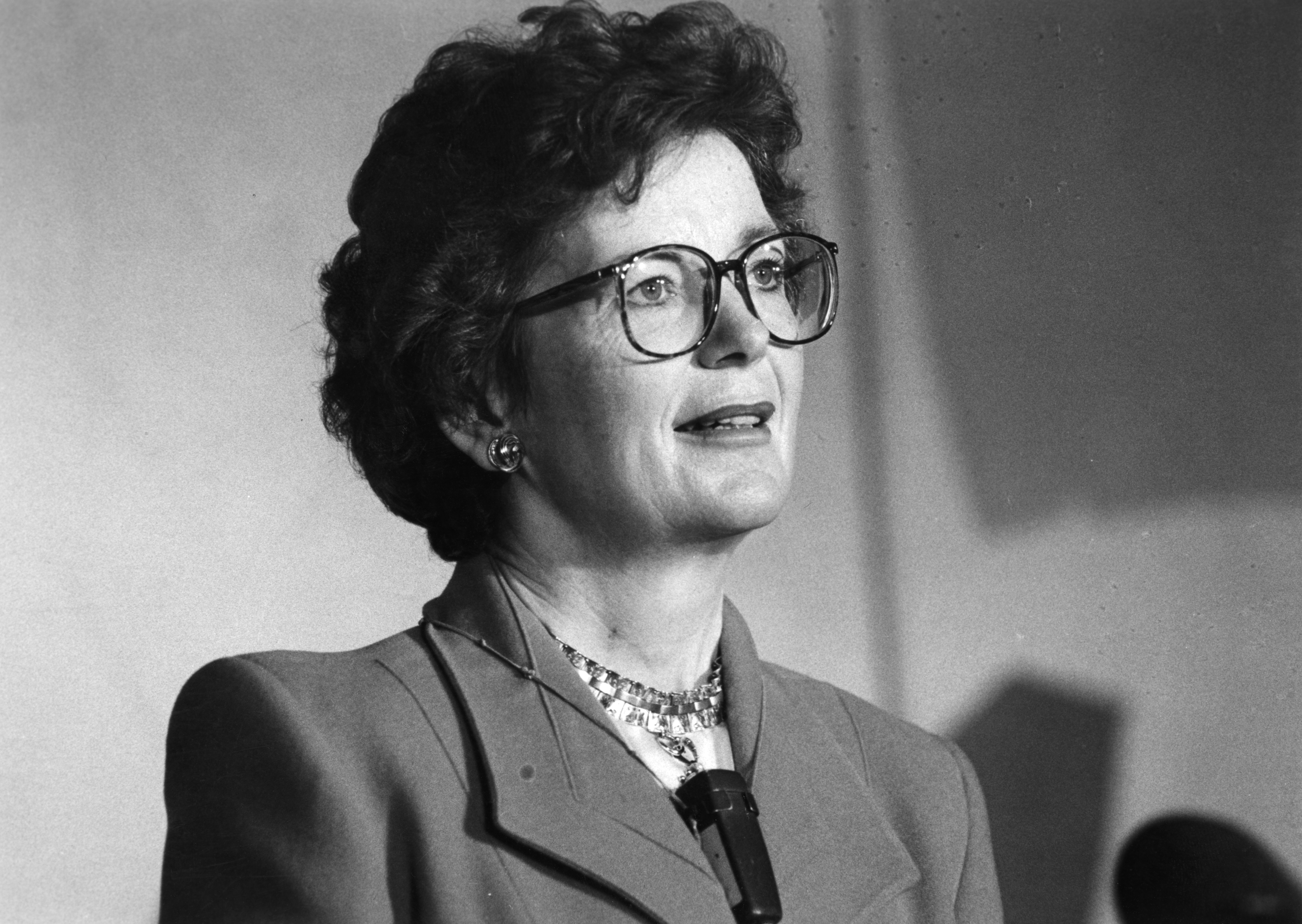
Robinson gives a speech, 1994

=== Inauguration and early term ===
Robinson was inaugurated as the seventh President of Ireland on 3 December 1990. She proved a popular President, earning the praise of Brian Lenihan himself who, before his death five years later, said that she was a better President than he ever could have been.

In 1991, Robinson was prevented from leaving the country by Charles Haughey's government. The power of the government to prevent the president from leaving the country is enshrined in Article 12.9 of the Irish constitution, which states that "the President shall not leave the State [...] save with the consent of the Government". Robinson had been invited to deliver the BBC Dimbleby Lecture, and was to be speaking on the position of women and the family in Ireland. Wary of Robinson's position as a feminist and human rights lawyer, the government prevented her from leaving as they wished to avoid the negative publicity that they believed would arise from a speech they believed would be highly critical of the Irish state.

=== International relations ===
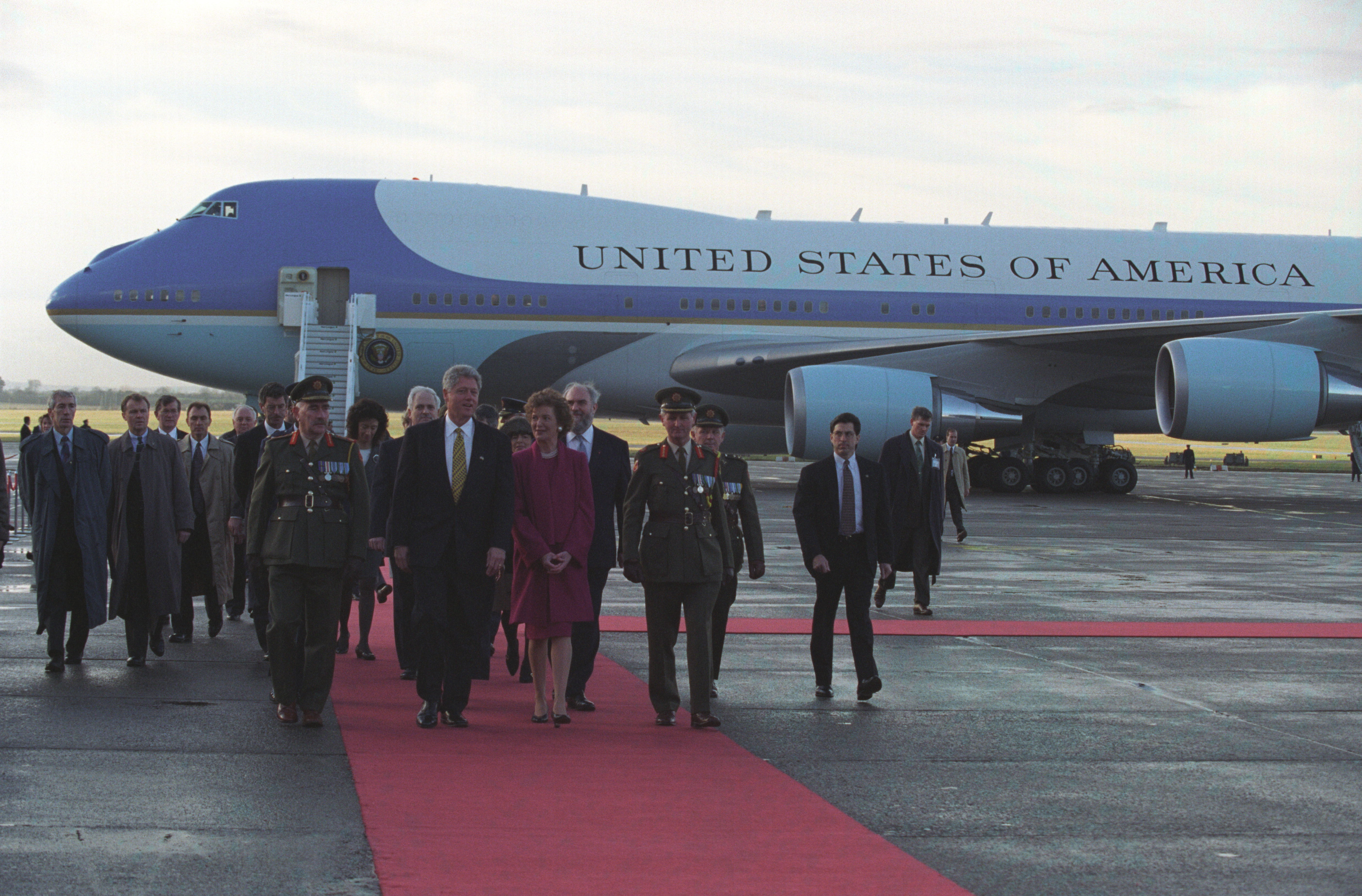
Robinson greets U.S. President Bill Clinton on a visit to Dublin, 1995

In 1992, Robinson travelled to Somalia, which at the time was struck by famine. She then travelled to the UN to make a report of her findings. The UN ultimately failed in its effort to relieve the famine, and the United States eventually intervened, ending the famine by March 1993.

In the summer of 1993, Robinson met and shook hands with both Queen Elizabeth II and Gerry Adams (the president of Sinn Féin), meetings which occurred on two separate occasions. On 27 May, Robinson became the first serving Irish president to visit the United Kingdom and meet Queen Elizabeth II at Buckingham Palace. She later welcomed visits by senior members of the British royal family, most notably Charles, Prince of Wales, to her official residence, Áras an Uachtaráin. In June, a few weeks after her trip to London, Robinson controversially met and shook hands with Gerry Adams in Belfast. Dick Spring, now the Tánaiste and Minister for Foreign Affairs, had advised her not to meet Adams, whose party was linked with the Provisional IRA. His disapproval was well-circulated by Irish media. However, the Government refused to formally advise her not to meet with him. During her various visits to Northern Ireland, she in fact regularly met politicians of all hues, including David Trimble of the Ulster Unionist Party and John Hume of the Social Democratic and Labour Party.

=== Oireachtas ===
In the previous 52 years, only two addresses to the Oireachtas (parliament) had taken place: by President John F. Kennedy of the United States on 28 June 1963 during a state visit to Ireland, and by President Éamon de Valera in 1969, to mark the fiftieth anniversary of the foundation of Dáil Éireann. Robinson delivered two such addresses. She was also invited to chair a committee to review the workings of the United Nations, but declined when asked to by the Government of Ireland, who feared that her involvement might make it difficult for it to oppose the proposals that would result.

=== Legislation and popularity ===
As President, she signed two significant bills that she had fought for throughout her political career: a bill to fully liberalise the law on the availability of contraceptives; and a bill fully decriminalising homosexuality, and which unlike legislation in much of the world at the time, provided for a fully equal age of consent. In 1996, she also signed the legalisation of divorce into law.

Robinson was an exceptionally popular president, and halfway through her term of office her popularity rating had reached an unprecedented 93%.

=== Resignation as president ===
Robinson issued her resignation as president in a message to the Ceann Comhairle of the Dáil, taking effect on 12 September 1997. Taoiseach Bertie Ahern said in a statement that her resignation "was not unexpected" and wished her "every success". Robinson resigned to take up the appointment as United Nations High Commissioner for Human Rights. Upon her resignation as president, the role of President of Ireland was transferred to the Presidential Commission (which comprised the Chief Justice of Ireland, the Ceann Comhairle of Dáil Éireann and the Cathaoirleach of Seanad Éireann) from 12 September to 11 November 1997, when the new president Mary McAleese was sworn in. Despite leaving office with almost three months remaining in her presidency, Robinson later expressed regret at her early departure, indicating she could have postponed her acceptance of the High Commissioner's office.

== High Commissioner for Human Rights (1997–2002) ==
Robinson became the United Nations High Commissioner for Human Rights on 12 September 1997, resigning the presidency a few weeks early to take up the post. Media reports suggested that she had been head-hunted for the post by Secretary-General of the United Nations Kofi Annan, to assume an advocacy as opposed to an administrative role, in other words, to become a public campaigner outlining principles rather than the previous implementational and consensus-building model. The belief was that the post had ceased to be seen as the voice of general principles and had become largely bureaucratic. Robinson's role was to set the human rights agenda within the organisation and internationally, refocusing its appeal.

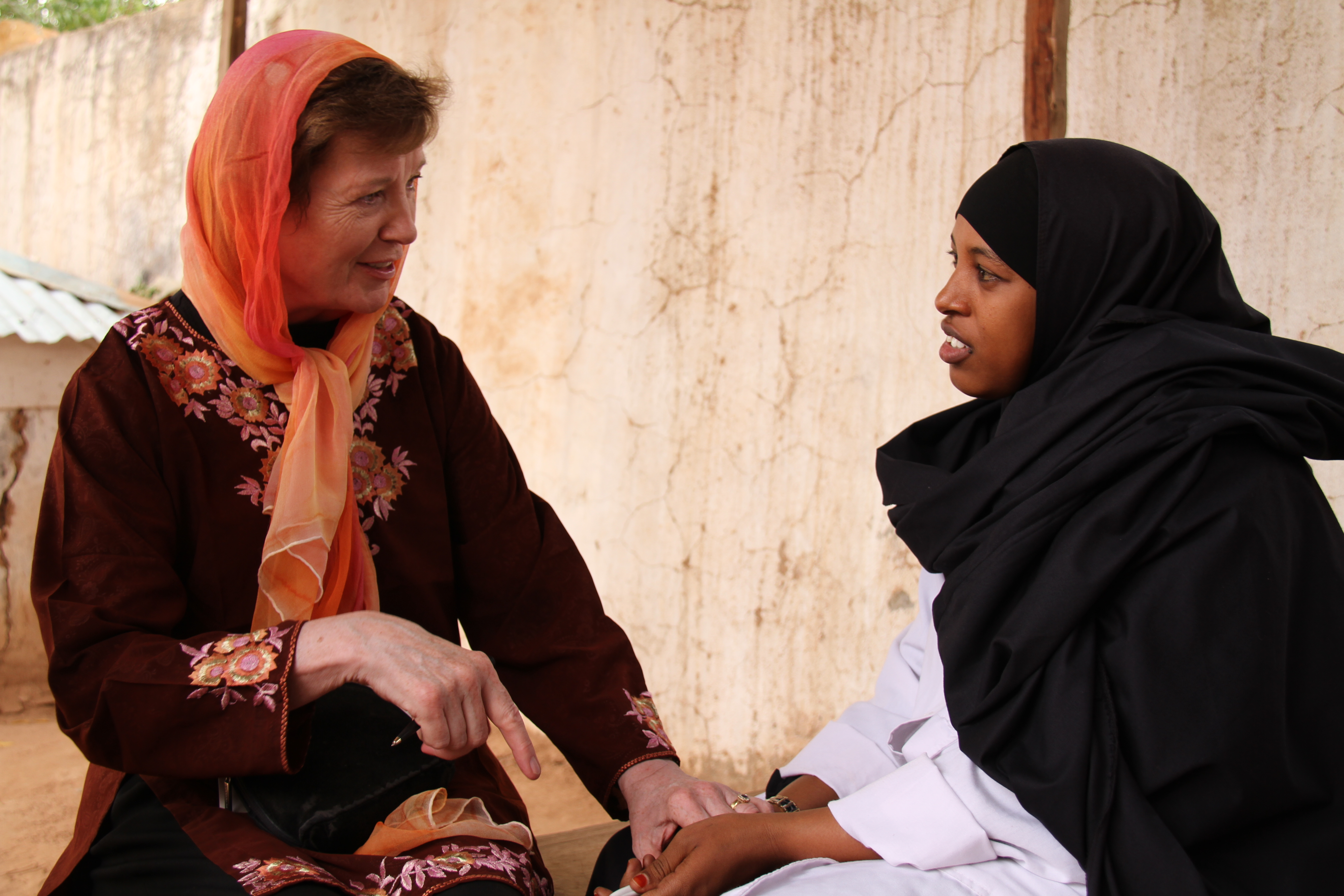
Robinson in Somalia, 2011

In November 1997, she delivered the Romanes Lecture in Oxford on the topic of "Realizing Human Rights"; she spoke of the "daunting challenge" ahead of her, and how she intended to set about her task. She concluded the lecture with words from The Golden Bough: "If fate has called you, the bough will come easily, and of its own accord. Otherwise, no matter how much strength you muster, you never will manage to quell it or cut it down with the toughest of blades."

Robinson was the first High Commissioner for Human Rights to visit Tibet, making her trip in 1998. During her tenure, she criticised the Irish system of permits for non-EU immigrants as similar to "bonded labour" and criticised the United States' use of capital punishment.

In 2001, she chaired the Asia Regional Preparatory Meeting for the World Conference against Racism, Racial Discrimination, Xenophobia and related intolerances, which was held in Tehran, Iran. At this meeting, neither the representatives of the Simon Wiesenthal Centre, a Jewish group, nor the Baha'i International Community were permitted to attend. She wore a headscarf at the meeting because the Iranians enforced an edict that all women attending the conference must wear one. Women who did not wear it were criticised, and Robinson said that it "played into the hands of religious conservatives".

Though she had initially announced her intention to serve a single four-year period, she extended the term by a year following an appeal from Annan, allowing her to preside over the 2001 World Conference against Racism in Durban, South Africa, as secretary-general. The conference drew widespread criticism, as did Robinson. Former US Congressman Tom Lantos said, "To many of us present at the events at Durban, it is clear that much of the responsibility for the debacle rests on the shoulders of UN High Commissioner for Human Rights Mary Robinson, who, in her role as secretary-general of the conference, failed to provide the leadership needed to keep the conference on track."

Robinson's period as High Commissioner ended in 2002, after sustained pressure from the United States led her to declare she was no longer able to continue her work. She had criticised the US for violating human rights in its war on terrorism and the World Conference against Racism was widely condemned in the US for its perceived antisemitism. Michael Rubin even went so far as to suggest in a tongue-in-cheek article that she be tried for war crimes for presiding over "an intellectual pogrom against Jews and Israel." On 9 November 2006, in Yogyakarta, she attended the International Conference, then she became one of 29 signators of the Yogyakarta Principles, adopted for protection of rights by International Human Rights Law.

== Post-commissioner period (2002 – present) ==
=== University of Dublin ===
Robinson served as the twenty-fourth, and first female, Chancellor of the University of Dublin. She represented the university in the Seanad for over twenty years and held the Reid Chair in Law. She was succeeded as chancellor by Mary McAleese, who had also succeeded her as president of Ireland.

=== Membership of "The Elders" ===
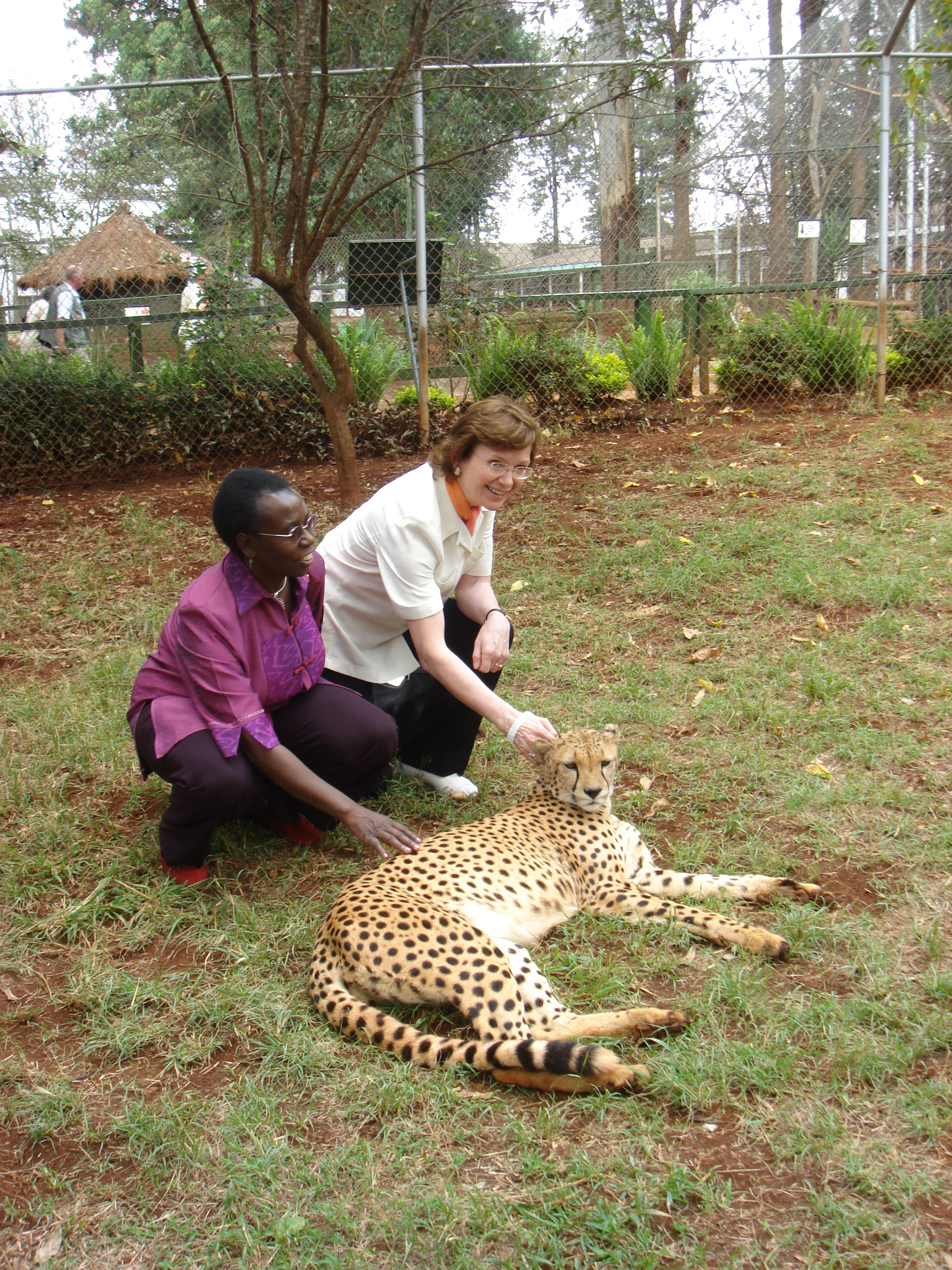
Robinson and Musimbi Kanyoro with a cheetah

Along with Nelson Mandela, Graça Machel, and Desmond Tutu, and others, Robinson was a founding member of "The Elders", a group of world leaders with the goal of contributing their wisdom to tackle some of the world's toughest problems. She has travelled with Elders delegations to the Ivory Coast, the Korean Peninsula, Ethiopia, India, South Sudan and the Middle East.

In August 2014, she was joined by fellow Elder Jimmy Carter during the 2014 Israel–Gaza conflict, to write an article in Foreign Policy magazine, pressing for the inclusion of recognition of Hamas as a legitimate political actor, noting the recent unity deal between Hamas and Fatah when the former agreed with the Palestinian Authority to denounce violence, recognise Israel and adhere to past agreements. Robinson and Carter called on the UN Security Council to act on what they described as the inhumane conditions in Gaza, and mandate an end to the siege. On 16 October 2014, she attended the One Young World Summit in Dublin. During a session with fellow Elder, Kofi Annan, she encouraged 1,300 young leaders from 191 countries to lead on inter-generational issues such as climate change and the need for action to take place now, not tomorrow. She was also the keynote speaker at the One Young World Opening Ceremony where she highlighted the need to empower young people to participate in decision-making processes that shape their future.

On 1 November 2018, Robinson was appointed as the Chair of The Elders, succeeding Kofi Annan who had died earlier in the year.

=== Memoirs ===
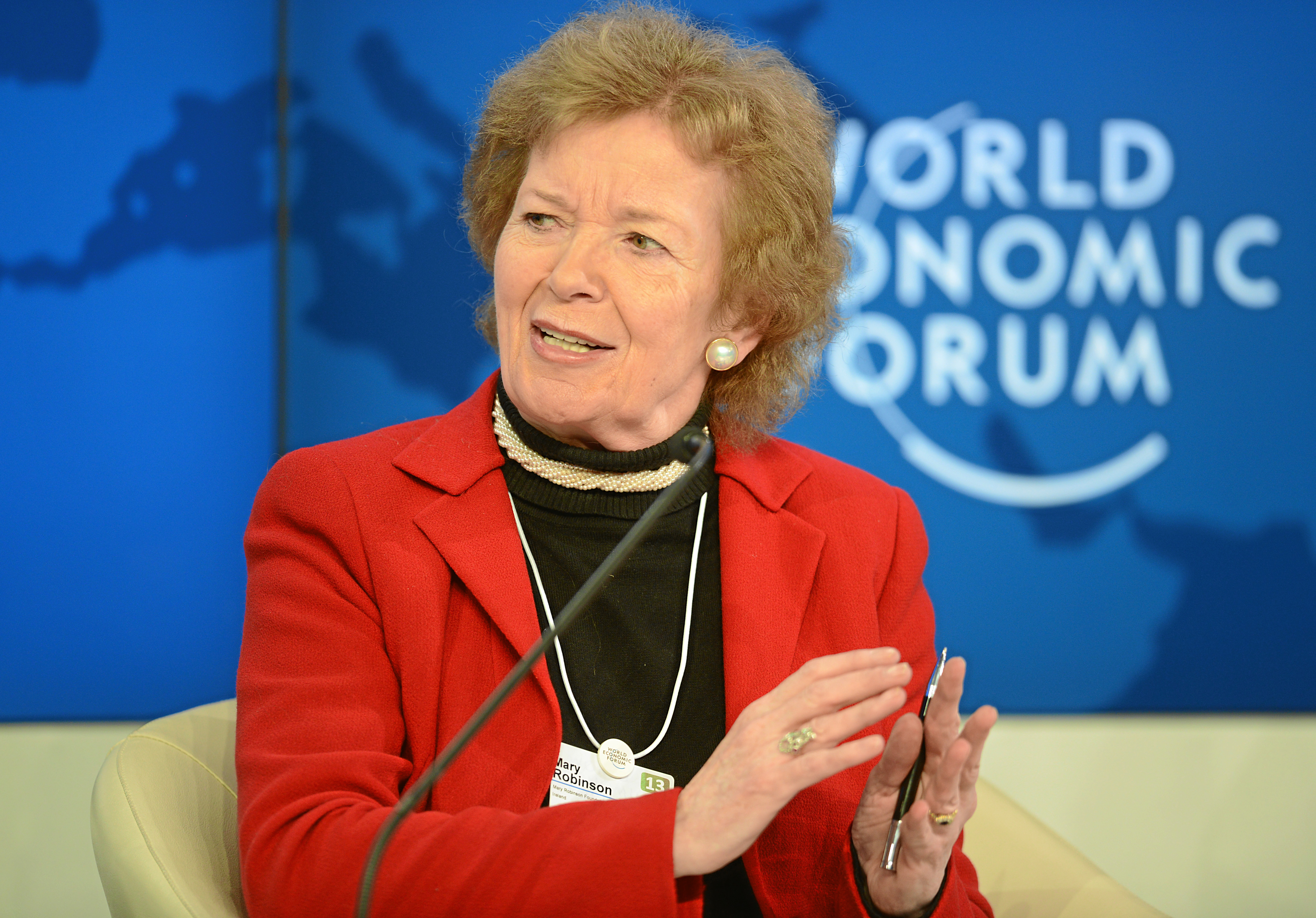
Robinson at the World Economic Forum in 2013

In September 2012, Robinson's memoir Everybody Matters was published by Hodder & Stoughton.

=== Views on agriculture ===
In 2016 at the One Young World summit, Robinson began to become vocal about her efforts to eat less meat and encouraged others to either do the same or adopt some type of entirely vegetarian diet in order to help fight climate change. Robinson was applauded for her suggestions but did receive condemnation from critics in her own country expressing concern that following her lead would inadvertently harm workers in the agricultural industry and meat industry; she was asked to withdraw her comments by her local council. At the 2018 summit she stood by her call for people to consume less meat despite the backlash. In 2019 Robinson announced that she believes in making tackling climate change a personal issue in our lives and for this reason she has stopped eating meat in favour of a more eco-friendly pescetarian diet.

=== Archive and tax avoidance controversy ===
In October 2016, it was revealed in the media that Robinson was planning to donate her archive to Mayo County Council, as part of the development of The Mary Robinson Centre, and had applied to have the archive designated under the Taxes Consolidation Act, 1997, potentially resulting in a personal tax credit to her worth over €2m, arising from the donation of her personal papers. The house proposed to be used for the centre was to be purchased from Robinson's brother for €665,000.

The website of the Mary Robinson Centre lists the contents of the proposed archive (valued at €2.5m) as including: "2,000 books on law and Human Rights 3,800 periodicals; A Master File of the President's engagements from December 1990 to September 1997; The symbolic light in the window of Áras an Uachtaráin from her Presidency; Robinson's personal diaries from 1967 to 1990 and from 1998 to 2001; 325 Archive Cartons..Scrap Books, Cassette Tapes." These papers relate to Robinson's almost 50-year career, spanning her time as a senator and barrister in the 1970s and '80s, her personal papers relating to the presidency and significant papers from the post-presidential period of her career, most notably her time with the United Nations as High Commissioner for Human Rights.

The project as a whole was condemned as an "expensive vanity project" by historian Diarmuid Ferriter. A member of the fundraising committee for the Centre argued that "Ballina is the same distance to Dublin as Dublin is to Ballina." Chief Executive of Mayo County Council, Peter Hynes (who is also on the board of the Mary Robinson Centre) stated that Robinson had a "legacy as a politician" and that the centre is designed to bring significant academic, tourism, education and economic opportunities to Ballina and the West. Hynes also commented that "The west coast town (of Ballina) has considerable pride in her outstanding career and on-going global leadership and sees the proposed centre as a living institution which will focus global attention and, working in collaboration with the National University of Ireland, Galway, will continue the conversation on topics of fundamental importance."

Following the reporting of the potential €2m windfall, Robinson announced she would abandon the plan to "gift" the archive to Ballina and instead she said the papers would be "gifted to NUIG, with Mayo County Council having full access to any part of the collection which is required to support the mission of the centre in Ballina". In addition she stated that she would now not avail of the tax credit for the donation.

=== Activities in non-governmental organisations ===
- Africa Europe Foundation (AEF), Member of the High-Level Group of Personalities on Africa-Europe Relations (since 2020)
- Institute for Human Rights & Business (IHRB), Patron
- Club de Madrid, member and former president
- Aurora Prize, member of the selection committee (since 2015)
- Arab Democracy Foundation, founding member of the board of trustees (since 2007)
- Clean Cooking Alliance, Member of the Leadership Council
- European Climate Foundation, board member
- International Commission of Jurists, head (since 2009)
- Scaling Up Nutrition Movement, Member of the Lead Group (since 2016, appointed by United Nations Secretary-General Ban Ki-moon)
- The B Team, Member
- World Justice Project, honorary co-chairwoman
- Association of European Parliamentarians with Africa (AWEPA), member of the Eminent Advisory Board
- Mo Ibrahim Foundation, board member.
- Mothers of Invention (podcast), co-host (since 2018)

=== Roles in international organisations ===
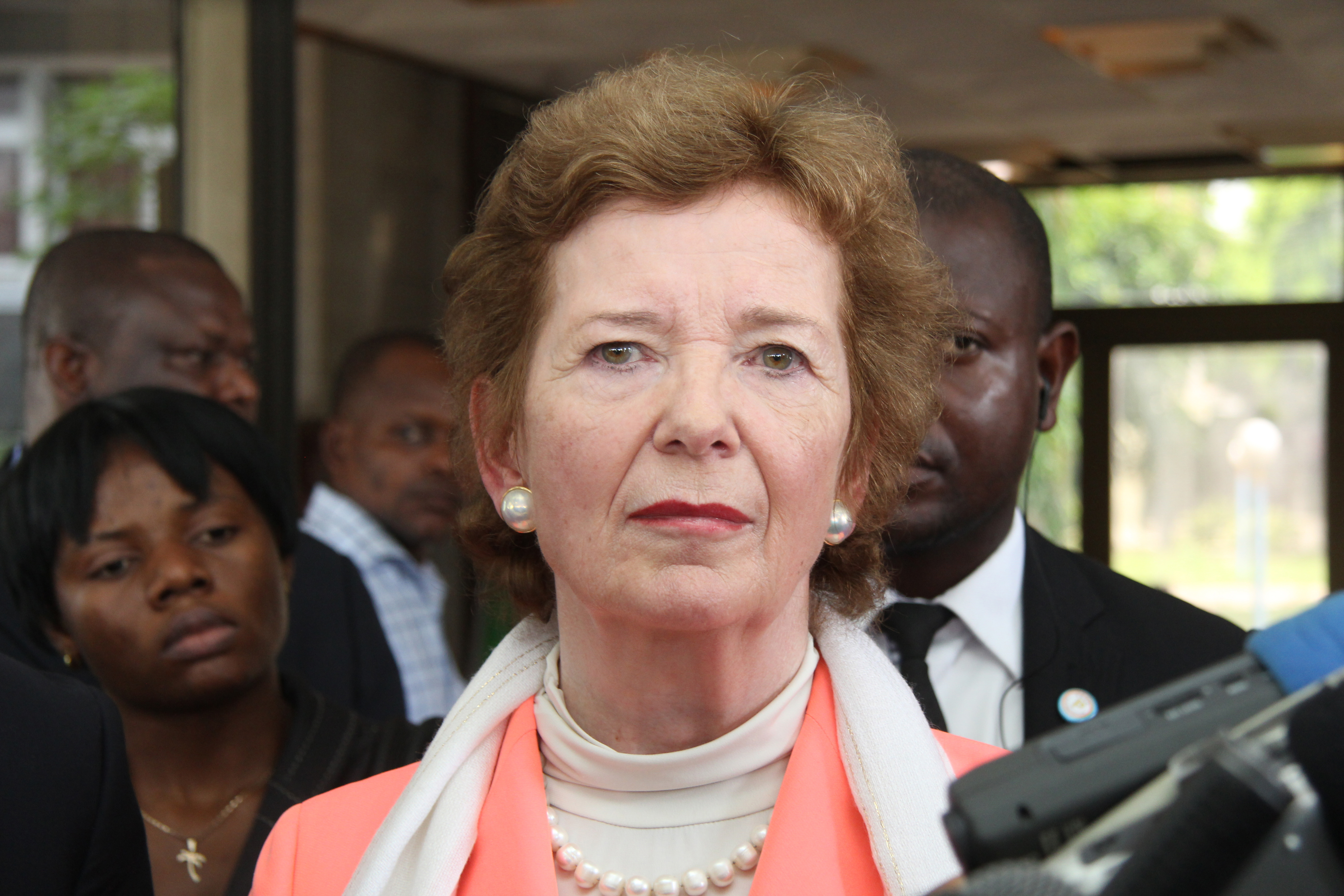
Mary Robinson, the UN Special Envoy for the Great Lakes region, on 28 April 2013 in Kinshasa, during a press briefing at the Ministry of Foreign Affairs

In March 2013, Robinson was chosen to oversee the implementation of a peace deal to stabilise the Democratic Republic of the Congo. Appointed as special envoy to Africa's Great Lakes region by UN Secretary-General Ban Ki-moon, she played a key role in supporting implementation of the U.N.-drafted peace deal signed by 11 African countries in late February 2013. During her tenure as special envoy, the 23 March Movement and other armed rebel groups surrendered to the Congolese government.

In July 2014, Ban Ki-moon appointed her special envoy for climate change to interact with global leaders ahead of the 2014 Climate Summit, in New York, at which the secretary-general said he hoped to forge political commitment to finalising an agreement in 2015. A month following her appointment, in August 2014, she stepped down as special envoy to Africa's Great Lakes region. In March 2015, she voiced support for fossil fuel divestment commenting "it is almost a due diligence requirement to consider ending investment in dirty energy companies".

In early 2016, she was appointed by Erik Solheim, the chairman of the Development Assistance Committee, to head a high-level panel on the future of the Development Assistance Committee.

In May 2016, Ban Ki-moon appointed Robinson and Macharia Kamau, as special envoys of the Secretary-General on El Niño and Climate, tasking them with calling attention to the people around the world affected by severe El Niño-linked drought and climate impacts, and mobilising an integrated response that takes preparedness for future climatic events into account.

In September 2016, she was appointed by Ban Ki-moon to serve as member of the lead group of the Scaling Up Nutrition Movement.

In December 2018, she was criticised by human rights organisations, Detained International and Guernica 37 International Justice Chambers, for her statements regarding Dubai's Sheikha Latifa's disappearance and escape attempt. After meeting Latifa at a family lunch on the invitation of Dubai's royal family, Robinson described Latifa to the BBC as a "troubled young woman" who regretted an earlier video in which she alleged being confined and tortured in Dubai. Detained International head David Haigh expressed astonishment at the former UN commissioner for repeatedly reciting a single statement from Dubai's official version of the events, "loving care of her family", and for dismissing Latifa's alleged attempt to escape from Dubai in February 2018. In February 2021, Robinson retracted her 2018 statement claiming on the BBC's Panorama programme that she and Latifa's stepmother, Princess Haya, were both misled over the health and stability of Latifa during that period, when she was held in enforced detention in a Dubai villa and Robinson was embroiled into the proof of life controversy to allay international concern over Latifa's disappearance from the public eye. Robinson gave an account of the incident on The Late Late Show on 26 February 2021, referring to it as the biggest mistake of her career.

In 2020, she led an independent probe of a report that cleared Akinwumi Adesina, the president of the African Development Bank, of wrongdoing.

== Recognition ==
Over the course of her career, Robinson has been awarded numerous honours, including the following:

- 1993 – New Zealand Suffrage Centennial Medal
- 1997 – North–South Prize
- 1998 – Freedom Medal
- 1999 – Erasmus Prize
- 1999 – Member of the American Philosophical Society
- 2000 – Félix Houphouët-Boigny Peace Prize by UNESCO
- 2002 – Sydney Peace Prize
- 2002 – James Parks Morton Interfaith Award
- 2003 – Otto Hahn Peace Medal in Gold of the United Nations Association of Germany
- 2004 – Amnesty International's Ambassador of Conscience Award for her work in promoting human rights.
- 2005 – Calderone Prize
- 2005 – Jack P. Blaney Award for Dialogue
- 2005 – "Outspoken" Award by the International Gay and Lesbian Human Rights Commission (IGLHRC)
- 2006 – Prince of Asturias Award for Social Science
- 2009 – Inamori Ethics Prize by Case Western Reserve University
- 2017 – Knight of Freedom Award
- 2018 – Kew International Medal
- 2018 – Tipperary International Peace Award
- 2024 – Tang Prize in the field of "Rule of Law".

On 29 September 2010, at a ceremony in Dublin, she received a damehood from the Military and Hospitaller Order of St. Lazarus of Jerusalem. As a former Head of State and in recognition of her significant contribution towards human rights she was awarded the honour of Dame Grand Cross of Merit.

=== Honorary degrees ===
In 1991 and in 2001, Robinson was awarded honorary doctorates by Brown University, University of Cambridge, University of Liverpool and Lisbon Nova University. In 1996 she received an honorary doctorate at Coventry University. On 22 January 2000, she received an honorary doctorate from the Faculty of Law at Uppsala University, Sweden. In 2004, she was awarded an honorary degree by McGill University.

In 2009, she was awarded an honorary degree of Doctor of Laws from the University of Bath, at the 1100th anniversary celebration of the Diocese of Bath and Wells, where she gave a lecture entitled "Realising rights: the role of religion in human rights in the future".

On 1 July 2025, she was awarded an honorary degree of Doctor of Laws from the University of Strathclyde.

=== U.S. Presidential Medal of Freedom ===
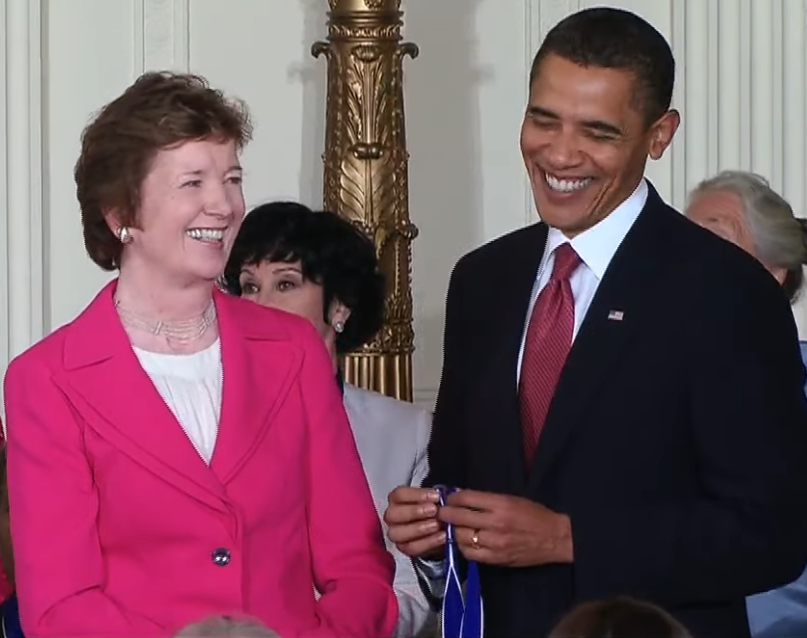
Robinson receiving the Presidential Medal of Freedom from Barack Obama

In 2009, she was awarded the Presidential Medal of Freedom, the highest civilian honour awarded by the US. In presenting the award, President Obama said "As a crusader for women and those without a voice in Ireland, Mary Robinson was the first woman elected President of Ireland, before being appointed U.N. High Commissioner for Human Rights. [...] Today, as an advocate for the hungry and the hunted, the forgotten and the ignored, Mary Robinson has not only shone a light on human suffering, but illuminated a better future for our world." Amnesty International congratulated Robinson on being named recipient.

The award was criticised by American and European Jewish groups, while others offered support. Parties opposed included the AIPAC, Anti-Defamation League, European Jewish Congress, and John Bolton, former US Ambassador to the UN. Bolton stated that those in the administration who recommended her either ignored her anti-Israel history, or missed it entirely. On the other hand, a group of Israeli human rights organisations stated "as leaders of a sector within Israeli civil society that monitors and often criticizes government and military policy for violating human rights, we do not see such actions as plausible reason for denying Mrs. Robinson the award." In response to the protests by some Jewish groups and commentators, Robinson said she was "surprised and dismayed" and that "this is old, recycled, untrue stuff," "I have been very critical of the Palestinian side. My conduct continues to be on the side of tackling anti-Semitism and discrimination." "There's a lot of bullying by certain elements of the Jewish community. They bully people who try to address the severe situation in Gaza and the West Bank. Archbishop Desmond Tutu gets the same criticism." In an open letter to Robinson, Hillel Neuer, a director of UN Watch, rejected Robinson's claim of being misunderstood or bullied by those who criticise her role in Durban. He said that she failed to confront purveyors of anti-Israel rhetoric. "You may not have been the chief culprit of the Durban debacle, but you will always be its preeminent symbol", he added. When asked about the opposition, White House Press Secretary Robert Gibbs replied "Mary Robinson was the first female President of Ireland, and she is somebody whom we are honouring as a prominent crusader of women's rights in Ireland and throughout the world."

US Speaker of the House, Nancy Pelosi, Senate Assistant Majority Leader, Dick Durbin, and other legislators welcomed the award to Robinson." Forty-five Republican Congressmen sent a letter to President Obama citing "her failed, biased record as United Nations High Commissioner for Human Rights". In a letter to President Obama, Nancy Rubin, a former US ambassador to the UN Human Rights Commission, praised Robinson as a "dedicated crusader for human rights for all people". Oxfam expressed its strong support for Robinson. The Council of Women World Leaders, the Champalimaud Foundation, and the ImagineNations Group welcomed the award to Robinson.

The International Gay and Lesbian Human Rights Commission congratulated Robinson, saying she "helped advance recognition of the human rights of LGBT people in her capacity as President of Ireland and as United Nations High Commissioner for Human Rights. She has been unwavering in her passionate call to end torture, persecution, and discrimination against LGBT people globally."

Political offices
Preceded by Patrick Hillery	President of Ireland; 1990–1997	Succeeded by Mary McAleese
Diplomatic posts
Preceded by José Ayala Lasso	United Nations High Commissioner for Human Rights; 1997–2002	Succeeded by Sérgio Vieira de Mello
Preceded by Kim Campbell	Chair of the Council of Women World Leaders; 2003–2009	Succeeded by Tarja Halonen
Academic offices
Preceded by Frank O'Reilly	Chancellor of the University of Dublin; 1998–2019	Succeeded by Mary McAleese
