= 2012 in Irish television =

The following is a list of events relating to television in Ireland from 2012.

== Events ==
- Ongoing – TV50, a series of special events throughout 2012, celebrating the 50th anniversary of the launch of RTÉ Television, then known as Telefís Éireann, on 31 December 1961.

=== January ===
- 3 January – RTÉ offended viewers by depicting a dog having its legs tied together and being tossed overboard into the sea off the coast of County Donegal as part of its TV50 celebrations in a broadcast.
- 17 January – RTÉ agrees to scrap its advertising "share deal" scheme from July following an investigation by the Competition Authority. Rival broadcaster TV3 had argued the practice was anti-competitive. RTÉ offered a discount to any advertiser which committed a percentage of its budget for television advertising to them.
- 30 January – Employees at RTÉ vote to back the broadcaster's plans to cut its staff budget by €1m a year following a ballot of members of the Trade Union Group. The vote comes after a recommendation for them to do so from an internal industrial relations tribunal, and will see the money saved through reductions in holiday pay.

=== February ===
- 6 February – Anglo Irish Bank agrees to allow Doughty-Hanson, the UK-based private equity firm that owns the loss-making TV3 to take a repayment holiday on an €80m loan until the TV network is sold.
- 11 February – The live televised France versus Ireland match in the 2012 Six Nations Championship is cancelled minutes prior to kick-off, prompting boos to ring out among disgruntled spectators inside a packed Stade de France. It is the first time such an event has happened since 1985. Ryle Nugent tells viewers from his Irish commentary box, "It is a dark day in the history of the Six Nations". Tom McGurk in studio asks, "What are we doing in a rugby stadium at 9pm on a Saturday night in February?"
- 12 February – David Kelly, the "grand old man of Irish acting", dies in Dublin aged 82 following a short illness.
- 13 February – The first advert in the UK and Ireland aimed specifically at dogs is broadcast by UTV. The 60-second commercial for the Bakers dog food brand features high-pitched sounds that cannot be heard by humans, and is a send up of the 1969 film The Italian Job.
- 13 February – In Bed with the Irish, a documentary set among Irish couples under duvets, is broadcast by RTÉ.
- 17 February – A 59-year-old RTÉ props assistant, who injured himself after falling over a studio floor lamp while working on The Saturday Night Show, is awarded €18,500 in damages. The judge says he had worked accident free in RTÉ for 38 years, that he had been working in poorly lit conditions in a cluttered studio when he was injured by one of RTÉ's props, and that he had been in pain since sustaining his injury.

=== March ===
- 5 March – TV3 airs the documentary Ireland's Secret Sex Lives: Paul Connolly Investigates which looks at the subcultures of swingers and dogging in Ireland.
- 7 March – The Broadcasting Authority of Ireland upholds a complaint against RTÉ made by Seán Gallagher relating to the tweet that derailed his presidential campaign.
- 13 March – Pyjama Girls, a documentary set among Dublin's public pyjama wearing community, is broadcast by RTÉ.
- 13 March – TV3 defends its reality programme Tallafornia after it was condemned by Senator David Norris as a "drink-sodden programme" which encourages its participants to "behave licentiously and compete to bring people home to bed them".
- 17 March – Debut of RTÉ's #HowToBeIrish, a programme made entirely of clips sent in by viewers explaining what being Irish means to them.
- 23 March – TV3 Director of Programming Ben Frow calls for resignations at RTÉ in the wake of the Father Kevin Reynolds scandal to prevent the libel case causing further damage to the broadcaster.
- 25 March – As the 100th anniversary of the sinking of the RMS Titanic approaches TV3 begins airing Julian Fellowes' epic retelling of the disaster. TV3 has itself invested €300m in the series.
- 27 March – RTÉ broadcasts a tribute to deceased comedian Hal Roach in one of its graveyard slots, a repeat airing of a programme from the That's Entertainment series first broadcast in 1972.
- 29 March – RTÉ Director-General Noel Curran announces €25m of budget cuts at the broadcaster, including pay reductions, staff redundancies and the closure of RTÉ's London office.
- 31 March – Former broadcast journalist Mike Nesbitt is elected leader of the Ulster Unionist Party.

=== April ===
- 3 April – Following last year's defamation of Father Kevin Reynolds by RTÉ, the state-controlled broadcaster's head of current affairs Ed Mulhall retires, Ken O'Shea resigns from Prime Time and its stablemate, Prime Time Investigates is axed.
- 6 April – RTÉ breaks with the Good Friday tradition of not sounding the Angelus bells by broadcasting them as usual on television. They are also heard for the first time on Holy Saturday, a move contrary to Catholic practice which is for them to be silenced to mark the period between the Crucifixion and Resurrection of Jesus. RTÉ argues that the daily prayer belongs to everyone rather than a single faith.
- 10 April – RTÉ says it is disappointed after details of a report from the Broadcasting Authority of Ireland into the Prime Time Investigates programme Mission to Prey were leaked. The report shows the BAI will find the documentary was unfair and breached the privacy of Fr Kevin Reynolds. The BAI has launched an investigation into how the leak occurred.
- 17 April – An edition of the recently axed Prime Time Investigates about the illegal cigarette trade is among three RTÉ documentaries to win awards at the 2012 New York Festivals International Television and Film Awards.
- 17 April – TV3 apologises for disparaging remarks that were made about Limerick in a recent edition of its series Come Dine with Me.
- 18 April – Journalists at RTÉ condemn the broadcaster's proposed closure of its London office as a "betrayal of RTÉ's public service remit".
- 18 April – Plans are announced for TV3 to double the size of its headquarters building at Westgate Business Park, Ballymount, Dublin, after the broadcaster signed a new lease with its landlord, Irish Property Unite Trust.
- 24 April – The Social Democratic and Labour Party urges the British government to support calls for RTÉ to reverse its decision to close its London office, which is scheduled to shut following this year's Olympic games.
- 24 April – Pat Hayes, the Mayor of Waterford expresses his dismay over suggestions RTÉ might close its studio in the city and cover the southeast region from Dublin. Waterford is one of four regional studios facing the axe because of budget cuts by the broadcaster.
- 25 April – RTÉ defends its broadcasting of Masterpiece: Ireland's Favourite Painting after presenter Mike Murphy wrote to The Irish Times criticising the show's length and timeslot (it aired for an hour from 10.15pm on 17 April, which Murphy described as: "Cromwellian edict of arts programming being banished into the Connacht of broadcasting, ie, at, or past most people’s bedtime").
- 29 April – Pat Byrne wins the first series of The Voice of Ireland.

=== May ===
- 2 May – TV3 and RTÉ sign a deal to retain the rights to broadcast UEFA Champions League football until at least 2015. TV3 is to continue to air Tuesday night matches while RTÉ is to broadcast games on Wednesday nights.
- 2 May – RTÉ reaches an agreement with Equity and the Irish Playwrights and Screenwriters' Guild to allow them to make their soap '‘Fair City'’ available on RTÉ Player and RTÉ One + 1.
- 2 May – Cardinal Seán Brady, the Catholic primate of all-Ireland, says he will not resign his post as the BBC's This World programme reveals he had details of those being abused by paedophile priest Brendan Smyth, but did not pass the information on to police or parents of the victims.
- 3 May – Launch of Saorsat, Ireland's free-to-air satellite television service. It carries RTÉ One, RTÉ Two HD, RTÉ News Now, RTÉjr, RTÉ One+1 and TG4.
- 14 May – RTÉ Two HD launches on Sky HD.
- 15 May – Taoiseach Enda Kenny rules out taking part in a debate on TV3 with Sinn Féin leader Gerry Adams about the Fiscal Compact referendum, and says he will not participate in any debates on the station ahead of the 31 May vote.
- 15 May – TV3 cancels The Apprentice, meaning it will not return for a fifth series.
- 29 May – The UK Government confirms that television viewers in Northern Ireland will be able to watch RTÉ One, RTÉ Two and TG4 on Freeview following the digital switchover.
- 29 May – RTÉ apologises after it emerged a member of staff airbrushed the logo of a TV3 microphone during a news report on the 27 May edition of the Nine O'Clock News.
- 31 May – RTÉ Director-General Noel Curran warns that the broadcaster is considering pay cuts and the cessation of certain services if it does not secure €25 million of cost reduction measures.
- 31 May – The Irish Times reports that TV3 has invested in "Metrocam" technology that enables its journalists to broadcast live images without access to a satellite van. Instead the camera has a radio frequency transmitter which allows video and audio to be relayed wirelessly to its studios via a transmission station.

=== June ===
- 7 June – The Irish Times reports that upgrades are planned for RTÉ Player and 3Player to make viewing from mobile devices and slower broadband connections much easier.
- 10 June – The Republic of Ireland's opening match against Croatia at UEFA Euro 2012 attracted the biggest television audience for a sports event in Ireland since 1994.
- 23 June – The Clare County Board is to write to Croke Park, expressing concern over the manner in which Clare hurling manager Davy Fitzgerald was treated on the 17 June edition of RTÉ's The Sunday Game, which discussed remarks he made to a Waterford player during that day's Munster semi-final in Thurles.

=== July ===
- 6 July – 50th anniversary of the first edition of The Late Late Show.
- 7 July – It is reported that TV3 will write directly to Taoiseach Enda Kenny to reject a suggestion that he was assaulted by reporter Ursula Halligan following an incident at the National Library on 4 July in which Kenny tripped over a flower pot as he attempted to evade Halligan's questions. The incident prompted a complaint from Kenny's staff.
- 10 July – BBC News executive Kevin Bakhurst is appointed managing director of News and Current Affairs at RTÉ, taking up the role in September.
- 17 July – The Irish Examiner reports that the Broadcasting Authority of Ireland has the TV3 programme Psychic Readings Live "on their radar" following a number of complaints about the late-night show where viewers are invited to call a premium rate telephone line to receive an on-air psychic consultation.
- 18 July – Former TV3 News Western Correspondent Jenny McCudden is named as the new editor of The Sligo Champion, becoming the first female to take up the position in the newspaper's 176-year history.
- 22 July – RTÉ 2fm presenter Rick O'Shea wins the first series of Celebrity Mastermind.
- 24 July – RTÉ subsidiary company RTÉ Transmission Network Ltd (RTÉ NL) is to be rebranded, and located away from the Donnybrook campus as part of an ongoing restructuring at the broadcaster.

=== August ===
- 18 August – RTÉ begins its Ireland on Screen season, teaming up with the Irish Film Board to showcase a number of home-produced films. The season begins with Jim Sheridan's The Boxer on RTÉ One, and also includes network TV premieres of Ondine, Happy Ever Afters and The Runway.
- 18 August – Littlewoods Ireland takes over Ireland's sponsorship of The X Factor as the programme returns to TV3 for a ninth season.
- 23 August – TV3 unveils its Autumn Schedule, which includes Deception, the broadcaster's first drama set on a Celtic Tiger era housing estate, and its first sitcom, On the Couch about three couples receiving counselling.
- 28 August – UTV Media – which owns the ITV franchise for Northern Ireland and the UK-based sports-orientated radio station Talksport – reports a summer of mixed fortunes in terms of advertising revenue. Coverage of the 2012 European Cup proved lucrative for Talksport, but television advertising was hit by the 2012 Summer Olympics.
- 29 August – The main evening edition of BBC Northern Ireland's regional news programme Newsline is relaunched with a fresh look, including a new studio and a single anchor replacing the two-presenter format.

=== September ===
- 3 September – The updated version of the U.S. soap opera Dallas makes its Irish television debut on TV3.
- 4 September – Labour's Disability Spokeswoman Senator Mary Moran criticises RTÉ’S decision not to show live coverage of the 2012 Summer Paralympics, describing it as "bitterly disappointing" and saying that she will write to the Director-General on the issue.
- 10 September – TV3's breakfast television strand Ireland AM is relaunched with a "newsier" format amid speculation that RTÉ is to launch its own breakfast television service later in the year.
- 13 September – TV3 announced the name of its new HD studio after signing a deal with Sony International to equip it with Sony technology. It will be called the Sony HD Studio.
- 20 September – TG4's reality series Feirm Factor – in which 10 farmers compete in a series of agricultural tasks to become the nation's best farmer – is optioned to six European countries.

=== October ===
- 2 October – TG4 launches its first high-definition channel titled TG4 HD. The service is launched on UPC Ireland. TG4 also update their on-air and off-air identity.
- 10 October – The first stage of the digital switchover occurs in the UTV region.
- 16 October – TV3 announce that their Director of Programming Ben Frow will leave the TV3 Group at the end of the year.
- 22 October – RTÉ Director of News and Current Affairs Kevin Bakhurst rules out a breakfast television programme for the broadcaster on cost grounds.
- 22 October – TV3 confirms plans to rebrand their 5.30 news bulletin as "The 5.30". The programme moves to a specially designed new virtual set at the station's Ballymount headquarters.
- 23 October – Northern Ireland completes its digital switchover at 11.30pm when the analogue signal is switched off.
- 24 October – The analogue television service in the Irish Republic is switched off at 10.00am, and is replaced by a second multiplex for Saorview. Saorview is available to 98% of Ireland, but there are problems receiving it in some mountainous areas.
- 25 October – TV3 makes its content available on Roku, an online subscription service that streams content in the United States, Canada and Britain.

=== November ===
- 3 November – TG4 airs the Match for Michaela, a Gaelic Football match between Donegal and Ulster from Belfast's Casement Park. The game is in aide of the Michaela Foundation, established in memory of Michaela McAreavey, who was murdered while on her honeymoon in Mauritius in 2011.
- 5 November – TV3 admits that it failed to properly notify viewers of its motoring show, The Driving Seat that car makers had been asked to pay up to €5,000 to have their products featured.
- 9 November – The Broadcasting Authority of Ireland upholds four viewer complaints against TV3's Psychic Readings Live. They include two involving predictions of pregnancy and one case in which a woman was told her flat would burn down.
- 13 November – Ben Frow, the outgoing Director of Content at TV3, is hired by UK commercial broadcaster Channel 5 as their Director of Programmes, and will take up the position from February 2013.
- 15 November – BAI begins its quintennial funding review of public service broadcasting in Ireland, expecting to complete the process in March 2013.
- 22 November – BAI calls on RTÉ to publish the findings of its internal report on the Frontline presidential debate programme broadcast in October 2011. The watchdog believes the editorial failings of the programme are more significant than have been publicly identified."
- 23 November – In a letter to BAI chairman Bob Jones and the broadcaster RTÉ, Fianna Fáil claims that the election of Michael D. Higgins as President has been "undermined" by the "failure" of RTÉ to "adhere to proper standards".
- 23 November – The Irish Times reports that TV3 is considering the introduction of a paywall for its 3Player service following ITV's decision to begin charging for some of its online content.

=== December ===
- 2 December – It is reported that the Catholic Communications Office has made an official complaint to RTÉ over a sketch by impersonator Mario Rosenstock that appeared to mock Holy Communion.
- 3 December – Psychic Readings Live airs for the last time after TV3 cancelled the programme.
- 5 December – Finance Minister Michael Noonan extends TV and film tax relief until 2020, and signals it will be restructured to take the form of a tax credit.
- 7 December – It is reported RTÉ is to provide staff training on what subjects are appropriate for discussion on social media sites such as Twitter following several controversies involving tweets from presenters and other employees of the broadcaster.
- 7 December – TG4 launches an on demand service on the pay-per-view service UPC Ireland.
- 11 December – The Irish Examiner reports that the largest and most expensive television to go on sale in Ireland has gone on sale at the Harvey Norman stores in Carrickmines, County Dublin. The LG 84in Ultra HD TV has a reach longer than the arm span of most adults, and is on sale for €26,999.
- 21 December – A record €118 million of foreign direct investment went into Irish film and television productions in 2012, it is reported.
- 23 December – Jockey Katie Taylor is voted the 2012 RTÉ Sports Person of the Year at the annual RTÉ Sports Awards ceremony, while former Republic of Ireland manager Jack Charlton is honoured with the RTÉ/ Irish Sports Council Hall of Fame Award. The event is beset with technical problems, including a sudden commercial break as Taylor is accepting her award from Sports Minister Leo Varadkar, forcing RTÉ to apologise for the glitches.

== Debuts ==
=== RTÉ ===
- 5 January – A Little Bit TV on RTÉ One (2012)
- 8 January – The Voice of Ireland on RTÉ One (2012–2016)
- 9 January – The Inbetweeners on RTÉ Two (2008–2010)
- 20 January – Who Knows Ireland Best? on RTÉ One (2012)
- 26 January – The Works on RTÉ One (2012–present)
- 2 February – 2 Broke Girls on RTÉ Two (2011–2017)
- May – Championship Matters on RTÉ Two (2012–present)
- September – Movie Talk on RTÉ One (2012)
- 5 November – Today on RTÉ One (2012–present)
- 8 November – Don't Trust the B— in Apartment 23 on RTÉ Two
- 12 November – The Mario Rosenstock Show on RTÉ Two (2012–2016)
- 16 November – Debra! on RTÉ Two (2011–2012)
- 29 November – Irish Pictorial Weekly on RTÉ One (2012–present)

=== TV3 ===
- January – Celebrity Come Dine with Me (2012–????)
- 18 February – Family Fortunes (2012–2014)
- 25 March – Titanic (2012)
- 28 May – Dublin Housewives (2012–2013)
- 16 June – Psychic Readings Live (2012)
- 17 June – Celebrity Mastermind (2012–present)
- 3 September – Dallas (2012–2014)
- Undated – Mastermind (2012–present)

== Ongoing television programmes ==
=== 1960s ===
- RTÉ News: Nine O'Clock (1961–present)
- RTÉ News: Six One (1962–present)
- The Late Late Show (1962–present)

=== 1970s ===
- The Late Late Toy Show (1975–present)
- RTÉ News on Two (1978–2014)
- The Sunday Game (1979–present)

=== 1980s ===
- Fair City (1989–present)
- RTÉ News: One O'Clock (1989–present)

=== 1990s ===
- Would You Believe (1990s–present)
- Winning Streak (1990–present)
- Prime Time (1992–present)
- Nuacht RTÉ (1995–present)
- Nuacht TG4 (1996–present)
- Ros na Rún (1996–present)
- Premier Soccer Saturday (1998–2013)
- TV3 News (1998–present)
- Ireland AM (1999–present)
- Telly Bingo (1999–present)

=== 2000s ===
- Nationwide (2000–present)
- TV3 News at 5.30 (2001–present)
- Against the Head (2003–present)
- news2day (2003–present)
- Other Voices (2003–present)
- Saturday Night with Miriam (2005–present)
- One to One (2006–2013)
- The Week in Politics (2006–present)
- Tonight with Vincent Browne (2007–2017)
- Xposé (2007–2019)
- Monday Night Soccer (2008–2013)
- At Your Service (2008–present)
- Championship Live (2008–present)
- Midday (2008–2016)
- Operation Transformation (2008–present)
- Raw (2008–2013)
- The Big Money Game (2008–2013)
- 3e News (2009–present)
- Dragons' Den (2009–present)
- The Frontline (2009–2013)
- Midweek (2009–2014)
- The Morning Show with Sybil & Martin (2009–2013)
- Republic of Telly (2009–2016)
- Two Tube (2009–present)

=== 2010s ===
- The Daily Show (2010–2012)
- Four Live (2010–2012)
- Jack Taylor (2010–present)
- Love/Hate (2010–present)
- The Saturday Night Show (2010–2015)
- Take Me Out (2010–2013)
- Mrs. Brown's Boys (2011–present)
- Come Dine with Me (2011–2013)
- The GAA Show (2011–present)
- MasterChef Ireland (2011–present)
- OMG! Jedward's Dream Factory (2011–2013)
- Paul Connolly Investigates (2011–2015)

== Ending this year ==
- 2 March – The Daily Show (2010–2012)
  - Four Live (2010–2012)
- Unknown date – Craig Doyle Live/The Social (2011–2012)
- Unknown date - Celebrity Mastermnd (2012)
- 15 April – Titanic (2012)
- 3 December – Psychic Readings Live (2012)

== Deaths ==
- 10 January — Mary Raftery, 54, journalist (States of Fear, "Cardinal Secrets"), ovarian cancer
- 6 February — Noel Kelehan, 76, musician, former conductor of the RTÉ Concert Orchestra and former musical director of Raidió Teilifís Éireann
- 12 February — David Kelly, 82, film and television actor
- 24 August — Maureen Toal, 82, actress best known for her role as Teasy McDaid in Glenroe.

== See also ==
- 2012 in Ireland
