= Nora Wall =

Irish Sisters of Mercy member

Nora Wall (formerly Sister Dominic) (born 1948) is a former Irish sister of the Sisters of Mercy who was wrongfully convicted of rape in June 1999, and served four days of a life sentence in July 1999, before her conviction was quashed. She was officially declared the victim of a miscarriage of justice in December 2005. The wrongful conviction was based on false allegations by two women in their 20s, Regina Walsh (born 8 January 1978) and Patricia Phelan (born 1973). Walsh had a psychiatric history and Phelan had a history of making false allegations of rape prior to the event. Phelan subsequently admitted to having lied.

Wall was the first woman in the history of the Irish State to be convicted of rape, the first person to receive a life sentence for rape and the only person in the history of the state to be convicted on repressed memory evidence. Her co-accused Pablo McCabe was a homeless schizophrenic man. In relation to one of the two rape allegations, the defence showed that McCabe could not possibly have been there on the date in question. The jury acquitted McCabe on that count, and convicted him and Wall on the second rape charge. On 1 December 2005, the Court of Criminal Appeal certified that Wall had been the victim of a miscarriage of justice. McCabe had died in December 2002.

The events took place following the airing of the documentary, States of Fear. A 2005 editorial in The Irish Times suggested that the programme influenced jury members and may have played a role in the miscarriage of justice against Nora Wall.

== Biography – Nora Wall ==
Wall was born in 1948 into a large farming family in the Nire Valley area of County Waterford. She joined the Sisters of Mercy in 1967, taking the name Sister Dominic.

She joined St. Michael's residential childcare centre in Cappoquin, County Waterford in 1975. It had been St Michael's industrial school, but this was phased out at the end on the 1970s. Two, family style houses were built to house the children in the state's care there. She became the manager of this new St. Michael's in 1978.

The children at St. Michael's came from nearby counties Waterford and Tipperary. They were from troubled families who could not cope and there were often several members of one family in the home at the same time.

== Biography – Pablo (Paul) McCabe ==
Pablo McCabe was also a local and almost the same age as Nora Wall. McCabe was handed over to St. Michael's industrial school in 1951 when he was a baby.

In 1988, McCabe addressed a gathering of the Sisters of Mercy in Gracedieu, Waterford. He spoke of being born in Dublin in 1949 to a single mother. She struggled until McCabe was three, but "had great difficulty in working, paying for accommodation and paying someone to look after me." Thus McCabe came to live in the "old St. Michael’s", the junior industrial school run by the Sisters of Mercy in Cappoquin. His memories were "very happy ones of caring and interested women." He then went to the Industrial School at Artane, Dublin, which he found traumatic, because it had "over nine hundred boys in a very strict set-up." After leaving Artane, he began to drift and became involved with drugs, stealing to support his habit, and spent time in South America. He returned to Ireland in 1977, receiving treatment at St. Brendan's Hospital, though alcohol abuse remained a problem.

In 1980, he came to Cappoquin again. He stated, "Cappoquin is my home. In Dublin I am homeless." The old institution where he had been reared had been replaced with the group homes, where he first met Wall. He hoped to find information about his mother, but none existed. In 1986 his mother wrote, hoping to find him. Wall facilitated a reunion, and McCabe and his mother spent three days together in Cappoquin. She had married in England and had four more sons, but had never told her new family of Pablo's existence.

== Rape accusation, conviction, and appeal ==
=== Charges ===
Wall left St. Michael's in 1990, and left the congregation of the Sisters of Mercy in 1994. In 1996, she worked in a St. Vincent de Paul shelter for homeless men. In October 1996, she was arrested in Dublin and questioned about allegations made by Regina Walsh, whom she had cared for from the age of eight. Walsh alleged that McCabe had raped her, while Wall held her legs, on the occasion of her twelfth birthday on 8 January 1990. She also claimed that Wall had sexually abused her on numerous occasions. Wall was not questioned then or subsequently on a second allegation: that she had assisted McCabe in raping Walsh in a virtually identical way two years previously. This latter charge, on which neither she nor McCabe was questioned, was the one on which they would subsequently be found guilty.

Wall maintained her innocence and was released without charge. She finished her contract with the St. Vincent de Paul and, after some time, got work with Sir Patrick Dunn's Hospital, which she was forced to leave after the Gardaí informed the hospital she should not be working with people. In May 1997 she was formally charged. She had to sign on at a Garda station twice a day and lived on social welfare.

=== Arrest and trial ===
McCabe was arrested on the same day in October 1996. Gardaí, who interviewed at the trial, admitted to making no notes, and, under pressure of questioning from defence counsel, also admitted that McCabe did not dictate a statement as they originally suggested, but responded to questions. This is in breach of regulations, which allow only minor clarifying questions during the taking of statements. McCabe had signed two statements that were strange in the way they were formulated. For example, part of the first statement says, "I told Sr. Dominic what had happened the night before in Regina’s room. I told her I had intimate relationships with her, meaning Regina. She said to me I was like St. Augustine."

At the trial a Garda claimed that he did not know that McCabe suffered from schizophrenia, and said that he didn't see what difference knowing whether he did or not would have made. McCabe made a further statement, concerning the night of Regina Walsh's 12th birthday party on 8 January 1990. The alleged rape on 8 January 1990 was the only charge on which McCabe was questioned. Like Nora Wall, he was never questioned on the second allegation that he had also raped Regina Walsh two years previously in 1987 or 1988, again with Wall present. In fact, neither McCabe's nor Wall's defence teams received notification of this second charge until 28 May 1999, only six days before hearings began, and two years after they were initially charged.

After he was released after questioning, it emerged that it would have been impossible for McCabe to have been in Cappoquin on 8 January. He was living in a Dublin hostel from 7 January and his movements were fully recorded until he was committed to Mountjoy prison on 10 January. The Gardaí then returned to Regina Walsh and put it to her that McCabe could not have been in Cappoquin on 8 January. On 5 November 1996, she "corrected" her statement to state that it was not the day of her 12th birthday, but of the celebration of her 12th birthday some days before or after that date, that the alleged assault took place. At the trial, witnesses were produced to show that there was no man present at the birthday party.

=== Conviction ===
On 11 June 1999 an RTÉ television news announcer stated that on the previous day

A 51-year-old former Sister of Mercy, has been found guilty of raping a 10-year-old girl. Nora Wall, originally from the Nire Valley, had been the victim's guardian while the child was in care at St. Michael's Centre in Cappoquin in County Waterford. Nora Wall's co-accused, Paul McCabe, a homeless man, was also found guilty of rape. Both have been remanded on bail, for sentencing in July. The victim was placed in care in St. Michael's when she was 6 years of age. When she was ten, she was raped by Paul McCabe, a homeless man who visited Nora Wall at St. Michael's. The victim told the jury that the nun held her legs while the man raped her. Both Paul McCabe and Nora Wall denied the charges. The pair were acquitted of a second count of raping the same child in 1990. The jury had heard conflicting evidence surrounding the dates of the alleged offence.

The second major charge against the two accused was that they had raped Regina Walsh in on 8 January 1990 on the girl's 12th birthday. The outcome was that the jury found the two accused innocent on that rape charge but convicted them on the other—the alleged rape that took place at least two years prior to the birthday party.

=== Press reaction ===
After the conviction the media used vicious language about Wall in particular – "Vile Nun", "Pervert Nun", "Mercy Devil", "I was Raped by Anti-Christ".

On 11 July 1999, the Sunday World carried a front page "exclusive" by crime correspondent Paul Williams. Entitled "Rape Nuns Abuse Pact with Smyth", it claimed that

Evil nun Nora Wall, convicted for helping to rape a ten-year-old child, also secretly provided children for sick paedophile priest Father Brendan Smyth. The Sunday World has learned that depraved cleric regularly visited St. Michael's Childcare Centre in County Waterford where Wall – then known as Sister Dominic – was working.

A female counsellor

who works with the victims of this horror home revealed that Fr. Brendan Smyth may have abused children there. .....[she said] "the information is very reliable and also very disturbing".

A few years later, Wall was to win EUR175,000 libel damages from the Sunday World. That news received little attention from the media.

=== Doubts about the conviction ===
On 17 June, a week after the rape convictions, Regina Walsh gave an interview to journalist Barry O'Keefe of The Star newspaper claiming that she had also been raped by a "black man in Leicester Square" in London. This was news to Wall's defence team. Moreover, The Star published the names of Walsh and her "witness" Patricia Phelan for the first time. A Kilkenny businessman read the newspaper and recognised Phelan as the woman who had made a false rape allegation against him, and the defence came into possession of this evidence.

=== Sentenced ===
On 23 July 1999, Wall and McCabe came before Judge Paul Carney for sentencing in the Central Criminal Court. Their counsel, Hugh Hartnett, sought an adjournment or a stay on any sentence. He told the court that there appeared to have been a grave breach of non-disclosure of evidence by the state. The state had not disclosed that Walsh alleged she had been raped in London. Neither had they disclosed that Phelan's allegations against an unnamed man had been dismissed in judicial review proceedings.

However Mr. Denis Vaughan Buckley for the state said that the Gardaí were not aware of these matters during their investigations, and rejected the claim that there had not been full disclosure of evidence, saying that these issues were not relevant to the case.

Passing sentence, the judge spoke of Wall's betrayal of the young girl. "This was a gang rape," he said. "The leader of the gang was the only person in the world who was charged with the protection of Regina Walsh. I don't think I need to say more than that." He sentenced her to life imprisonment and McCabe to 12 years. The hearing was not held in camera, as he said that Walsh and Phelan had forfeited their anonymity through newspaper interviews published since the trial.

Nora Wall was the first woman convicted of rape in the history of the state and now became the first person to receive a life sentence for that crime.

The director of the Dublin Rape Crisis Centre, Olive Braiden, welcomed the imposition of a maximum sentence, and said it would ensure that Nora Wall would be monitored for the rest of her life to prevent recurrence.

=== Convictions quashed ===
Four days later on 27 July 1999, the Court of Criminal Appeal quashed the convictions of the two accused. Both were granted bail and it was stated that the question of a possible re-trial would be considered subsequently. The Director of Public Prosecutions (DPP) applied to have the previous week's convictions set aside, telling the court that one witness had been called to give evidence at the trial inadvertently, despite a decision of the DPP that this person should not be called.

The Counsel for the Director of Public Prosecutions also referred to two other additional though less central factors in the case. The first was the information that the alleged victim had made but not pursued an allegation of being raped in England. He said that whatever the significance of this information it could not be properly argued that it was not relevant. He said that the prosecution was not aware of this information until it was mentioned in court. There was also another as yet undisclosed factor relating to the alleged victim which might be considered relevant.

=== Reaction of Kevin Myers, July 1999 ===
On Saturday 31 July, the Irish Times published an article by writer and journalist Kevin Myers. He was one of the very few to speak out in favour of Wall and McCabe at the time. He originally wrote a column on Monday 26 July to be published on Wednesday but it was withdrawn because what he sought to achieve was already happening – the release of the two accused. He described the trial as a "witch-hunt":

We should always beware the deeds of good men and women when there is a public war against vice of any kind. The "witches" of Salem were not persecuted by bad men or women; people then genuinely lived in fear of witchcraft, just as they did of communism in the 1950s. In the witch-hunt to remove it from public life in the US, innocent people's lives were ruined, yet through often honourable motives (apart from those of Joe McCarthy).

=== Reaction of Sisters of Mercy ===
After their conviction, the Sisters of Mercy issued a statement, which read:

We are all devastated by the revolting crimes which resulted in these verdicts. Our hearts go out to this young woman who, as a child, was placed in our care. Her courage in coming forward was heroic. We beg anyone who was abused whilst in our care to go to the Gardaí.

Even after the collapse of the case against the two accused, the Sisters of Mercy made no effort to apologise to Wall or to withdraw their statement of support for Walsh. One commentator (Note: editor of the website www.inquisition21.com which campaigns against false allegations of child abuse) remarked: "The young woman their hearts were going out to, was the false accuser, not their own innocent nun. Our absolutist system had seduced them into identifying with the accuser and betraying their own sister."

=== Court of Criminal Appeal ===
Four months later, the Director of Public Prosecutions, Mr James Hamilton, decided to seek a retrial in the case. In mid-November he released to the media a detailed six-page report dated 1 October, addressed to the attorney general, Michael McDowell, SC, which gave an account of the mistakes, failures and omissions in the offices of the DPP and Chief State Solicitor and in the conduct of the case, which resulted in a witness for the prosecution being called against the wishes of the DPP. A DPP had never previously explained himself in a specific case in the office's 25-year history.

However the attorney general declared that neither Wall nor McCabe would receive an apology, saying that the issue of an apology did not arise because the convictions had been quashed.

At the Court of Criminal Appeal on 22 November 1999, the DPP accepted "fully and ungrudgingly" that former nun Wall and McCabe are entitled to be presumed innocent of all charges brought against them. At the court hearing a lawyer for the DPP said he "very much regrets the errors which occurred in relation to the handling of this case by the prosecution" which led to the successful appeal.

The DPP's statement outlined the sequence of events from the decision to prosecute on 24 April 1997 up to their release by the Court of Criminal Appeal, initially on bail, in July just days after they had been sentenced to life and 12 years respectively. It explained how the prosecution came to call Patricia Phelan as witness, despite an earlier direction by the DPP made in April 1997 that she should not be called.

Denis Vaughan Buckley, SC, for the DPP, read a prepared statement. He said the DPP had considered the transcript of evidence that was given at the trial together with additional information obtained by the Gardaí and had concluded that it would not be proper to proceed with his application for a retrial. He added:

I am instructed to emphasise that the director's concern to defend the propriety of the decision to charge the two accused does not in any sense detract from the fact, which is fully and ungrudgingly accepted by the director, that the two accused are entitled to be presumed innocent of all the charges which were brought, not only those of which they were acquitted by the jury but also of those which were set aside and which are not to be the subject of further proceedings.

Presiding judge Mr Justice Murray sitting with Mr Justice Smyth and Mr Justice Kelly said the court would confirm the setting aside of the convictions, with no order for a retrial. The judges confirmed that neither Wall nor McCabe would have to pay the costs of their lengthy proceedings which could total around IR£60,000.

At the end of the court hearing, Wall pushed her way through the throng of reporters and family to catch up with Buckley, the prosecuting barrister. She extended her hand to the man who had presented the state's flawed case against her and said "thank you for what had just happened in court." According to Irish Independent journalist Aideen Sheehan, Buckley shook hands, looking taken aback at the unexpected gesture, so rare coming from the opposing side after such a serious criminal trial.

On 1 December 2005, the Court of Criminal Appeal finally certified that Wall had been the victim of a miscarriage of justice.

== Aftermath ==
=== Nora Wall ===
After her acquittal, Nora Wall was asked by journalist Kevin Moore what she planned to do with the rest of her life:

Well, I suppose to be practical and realistic people at my age are taking early retirement and being made redundant. And you know, what employer wants a person like me? They will ask what you have done for the last three years. I signed on twice a day at the garda station, had 32 court appearances, had a six-day trial in the Central Criminal Court, four days of a life sentence in the Joy, you know, what employer wants that?

Wall described how she felt after she was arrested:

I could not understand what they were saying to me at first. When they said "rape", I said that I was never raped. And it did not make sense. Then, they said that it happened in St. Michael's in Coiscéim. And it still did not make sense to me. And then they said, Regina Walsh ... I was still turning around in my head how this could be. And then they mentioned Paul [McCabe]. That did not make sense at all to me. And then, when they told me what was supposed to have happened, I said, "Look, I could not think like that, never mind do a thing like that" ... It was a full 11 months afterwards that I got the book of evidence.

On her treatment by the Gardaí, Wall stated:

Well, they could have been nicer to me verbally. I went on a bus to Knock and booked into a B&B and the next morning I walked around Knock and went to Mass and I went into the Blessed Sacrament Church and I read the book of evidence there. And, after reading it, I was very much at peace with myself. I wrote to my brothers and sisters and I remember I used the 4 Ds ... I said that I had read the book and I can cope with it and there is nothing in it that I can't defend, deny, discuss, or debate... I have no ill feeling against Regina and Patricia.

Religious affairs journalist Breda O'Brien wrote:

It would be easy to demonise the two young women, but Nora Wall will have none of it. Regina Walsh had spent time in St. Declan’s Psychiatric Unit, after a suicide attempt, immediately prior to making the allegations. Regina and Patricia were vulnerable people, she maintains, and she in particular commends Patricia for having the courage to eventually admit that she had lied. It had a particular poignancy, because Patricia was her "first baby", reared since 13 months of age in Coisceim. After the miscarriage of justice was declared, Nora extended her hand to Patricia and told her that she was "still her first baby", which caused Patricia to fall into her arms and cry uncontrollably.

Nora Wall currently lives in a private apartment on the grounds of Cuan Mhuire (a narcotic and alcohol rehabilitation centre) just outside the town of Athy in County Kildare.

=== Pablo McCabe ===
Although there were two persons accused of rape, the media focused almost exclusively on Nora Wall. An exception is the detailed account of the case by Breda O'Brien in Studies Review entitled: "Miscarriage of Justice: Paul McCabe and Nora Wall". She quotes the words of Linda Loman in Arthur Miller's 'Death of a Salesman', about her husband Wille Loman enduring humiliation at the end of his career;

"I don't say he's a great man... His name was never in the paper. He's not the finest character that ever lived. But he's a human being, and a terrible thing is happening to him. So attention must be paid. He's not to be allowed to fall in his grave like an old dog. Attention, attention must finally be paid to such a person."

After his release from prison in July 1999, Pablo McCabe lived in Oak House, a hostel for homeless men in the inner-city of Dublin. Over the next three years, he lived a life typical of many residents there. Frequently short of money, he would occasionally drink heavily and attempt to pressure other men into bringing alcohol into the rooms, despite it being prohibited. During these times, he often became belligerent and offensive.

His physique had been broken down over the years by alcohol and poor diet and was further weakened by a stroke. When speaking to men in the hostel and nearby day centre, he always maintained his innocence of the rape, but said that the mud had stuck. His mother wrote to him from England but he did not reply to her letters. He had four stepbrothers in Liverpool but made no attempt to contact them. In November 2002, he had a seizure in the hostel and was rushed to the Mater Hospital where six weeks later after a number of other collapses he died, a few days before Christmas. His mother Helen and stepfather were informed but because of illness could not travel immediately.

His remains were kept in the mortuary of the Mater until the family could travel. His mother and his stepfather attended the funeral in the Franciscan Church in Merchant's Quay, Dublin, on 14 January 2003.

=== Court of Criminal Appeal, 1 December 2005 ===
On 16 December 2005 the three judges of the Court of Criminal Appeal gave detailed reasons for their decision. They began by providing a summary of the legal background as follows (minor editorial changes have been made for the purpose of clarity):

On 10 June 1999, Nora Wall was convicted by the Central Criminal Court of rape contrary to common law and of indecent assault contrary to common law as punishable by s.10 of the Criminal Law (Rape) Act, 1981. On 23 July 1999, she was sentenced by the Central Criminal Court to imprisonment for life for the offence of rape and to 5 years imprisonment for indecent assault.

On 27 July 1999, Nora Wall brought a bail application before the Court of Criminal Appeal, at which point senior counsel on behalf of the Director of Public Prosecutions (DPP) conveyed to that court the DPPs consent to the granting of leave to appeal, and further consented that the appeal be allowed and that a retrial be directed. This startling turn of events was referable to (a) the inadvertent calling as a witness on behalf of the prosecution, Patricia Phelan, a person whom the DPP had specifically directed should not be so called at the trial and (b) matters regarding the complainant, Regina Walsh, which had not been disclosed to the lawyers representing the applicant prior to trial.

On 22 November 1999, counsel for the DPP indicated to the court of criminal appeal that the DPP was not proceeding with an application for a retrial. Counsel further indicated that the DPP "fully and ungrudgingly" accepted that the applicant was entitled to be presumed innocent of all charges preferred against her. The court accordingly quashed the conviction of Nora Wall and the sentences imposed in respect thereof.

In the main body of the judgement, the three judges went on to find that, due to the withholding of important information by the prosecution, including the investigating police, at the trial stage, it was not until appeal that the court heard a substantial body of significant evidence that had not been disclosed to the defence.

Concerning the complainant, Regina Walsh, the evidence that had not been disclosed to the defence included that she:

1. had been diagnosed with a psychiatric illness and admitted to a psychiatric hospital and undergone treatment;
2. had a recollection of events that arose as the result of "flashbacks" and had no full memory or recall of those events;
3. had previously made a false allegation that she was raped; and
4. had previously falsely alleged that she had been assaulted.

Concerning the witness Phelan, the prosecution had failed to disclose that:

1. prior to the trial, a direction had been made that she not be called as a witness as she was regarded as being unreliable;
2. she had made allegations against her late uncle and another man over an alleged rape, and that the High Court had made findings adverse to her credibility and reliability;
3. the police officer who had taken her statement in respect of the complainant was the same police officer who investigated the earlier false complaints made by her against her uncle and against the other man;
4. the DPP and the Chief State Solicitor had the carriage of the proceedings in the High Court in which the adverse findings against her had been made;
5. subsequent to the conviction and sentence of Nora Wall, Phelan disclosed to another nun, Sister Mona Kileen, that she had lied in her statement and that she had given false evidence against the applicant;
6. there was a strong risk of collusion between Phelan and the complainant Walsh.

The judges noted that in her further statement of 2 April 2001, Phelan in part stated:

In the trial, held at the Central Criminal Court in Dublin, I gave evidence on oath in the complaint against Nora Wall and Paul McCabe. In evidence, I told the judge and jury that I saw Paul McCabe rape Regina and that Nora Wall was present holding Regina's legs down. I gave other evidence but I cannot remember what. At the time I gave this evidence in court, I knew it was wrong and against the law but I just wanted to get back at Dominic (i.e. Nora Wall). I was also afraid to pull back on my evidence because I thought that once I had made a statement I had to give evidence in court. The reason why I wanted to get back at Dominic was because she used to physically beat me when I was living the Group Homes. She gave me a terrible life and I hated her. I remember ringing Sr. Mona Kilkeen. She was a good friend of mine for many years. It was during the trial, but I cannot remember much of the details.

The Court of Criminal Appeal found that a miscarriage of justice had occurred, and that there had been a serious breakdown in communications between the offices of the Director of Public Prosecutions, the Chief State Solicitor, the Garda Síochána (police) and prosecuting counsel.

The court made particular reference to a file note contained within the file of the DPP which was in the following terms:

Evidence of Patricia Phelan

Local Gardaí who have dealings with her during previous investigations have found her most unreliable. She never mentioned to the members anything about a rape at any time. Therefore her evidence should not be accepted as accurate.

From the appeal bench, Mr Justice Kearns found that "there had been significant non-disclosure in this case, including (a) the information that Regina Walsh had made, but not pursued, an allegation of being raped in England, and (b) the non-disclosure of Regina Walsh's very proximate and material psychiatric history" .

He also found that:

the applicant was further prejudiced during the course of her trial by evidence of which the defence had no prior notification, namely, that Regina Walsh recalled the alleged episodes of rape by reference to "flashbacks and/or retrieved memory", while there was "no scientific evidence of any sort adduced to explain the phenomenon of flashbacks and/or retrieved memory.

After the Court of Criminal Appeal confirmed Nora Wall's innocence, she approached Patricia Phelan. According to Irish Independent journalist Ann O'Loughlin "Immediately after the court's decision, Ms Wall, with her hand outstretched, approached Ms Phelan. A tearful Ms Phelan threw her arms around Ms Wall and hugged her."

== Criticism of the handling of the case ==
=== Mr Justice Paul Carney ===
Short-lived criticism of the judge centered not so much on his description of Nora Wall as a "gang rapist" but on the sentence of life imprisonment he imposed on her. University College Galway law lecturer Tom O'Malley said that the life sentence was completely unexpected as past cases of serial and serious child sex abuse had attracted sentences of between eight and 12 years.

After the Nora Wall case however, Mr Justice Carney struck some rather different notes. In 1999, Carney told a seminar in South Africa that some alleged victims of rape might be pressured into continuing with complaints they were reluctant to pursue. "Such pressure could come from parents, boyfriends, policemen, prosecutors, rape crisis centres and victim support counsellors," he said. "I have no way of knowing whether such pressure exists, but I would be very concerned if it does, particularly in relation to those cases which can be profiled as unlikely to result in a conviction."

In April 2003, at a Women Lawyers' Association conference, Carney dismissed the claim of the director of the Rape Crisis Centre (RCC) that there was no such thing as a false sexual charge. "This is not the experience of the courts," he said. "In relation to the balance of rape cases which are contested, there is a majority of acquittals." The judge also criticised an RCC counsellor for suggesting in a victim impact statement that the severity of sentence imposed on a rapist would determine the degree to which the victim became "reconciled with the justice system". Carney said it was a "serious abuse of process" for the author of a victim impact report to use it to campaign for a heavy sentence.

The former director of the Rape Crisis Centre, Olive Braiden, clashed with Carney at the conference. "He launched into a criticism of a senior counsel who was not present, and I said I regretted that he had raised the matter in her absence," she said.

The above examples are taken from a detailed profile of Mr Justice Paul Carney in The Sunday Business Post on 13 April 2003, written by barrister and author Kieron Wood. The article is entitled "Judge With One Eye on the Media". It includes some critical comments and notes that "His time on the bench was marked by controversy". Nevertheless, it contains no reference to the case of Nora Wall and Pablo McCabe.

=== The DPP ===
On 6 September 1999, the Irish Independent reported the views of the Dáil (Irish parliament) opposition party Justice spokesman Jim Higgins:

The Director of Public Prosecutions faced a barrage of criticism for its handling of the high profile case. Fine Gael's justice spokesman Jim Higgins said it was dealt with sloppily the prosecution pursued the case "with vigour and determination" but on the day after the convictions the DPP moved to have them quashed. "There are two issues here," said Mr Higgins. "The first is how a witness could have been called to give evidence against the expressed wishes of the DPP. The other is the non-disclosure of evidence. It is common law principle that all material in possession of the prosecution must be handed over to the defence, even if it is damaging to the prosecution's case. We have to investigate whether that evidence was withheld deliberately or inadvertently."

The issue of non-disclosure of evidence in the Nora Wall case was not followed up in Ireland, but did attract some attention abroad. The Journal of the Law Society of New South Wales (Australia) for June 2006 has an article by solicitor Greg Walsh entitled "Criminal Law: Obligation is on prosecutors to disclose". This includes a detailed discussion on the Nora Wall case. However, there seems to be no equivalent article in the journal of the Irish Law Society.

=== The Gardaí and the Chief State Solicitor's Office ===
On 21 November 1999, Liz Allen, crime correspondent for the Sunday Independent, wrote that the Chief State Solicitor's Office which dealt with the Nora Wall case also dealt with a previous case involving a sexual assault allegation by Patricia Phelan, the woman who was later mistakenly called as a witness against Nora Wall.

In the Patricia Phelan case in 1997 (in which she accused the Kilkenny businessman), Mr Justice McCracken carried out a High Court judicial review and decided that there should not be a trial. The state asked for time to consider whether it would appeal this decision, but three weeks later, the then DPP, Eamon Barnes, ordered the Chief State Solicitor's Office to return to court to say it did not wish to proceed any further with the case it was taking on behalf of Patricia Phelan and another woman.

The Sunday Independent obtained documentation dated May 1997, which shows that the Chief State Solicitor's Office wrote to the solicitor for the Kilkenny businessman in the case taken on behalf of Ms Phelan, providing a list of witnesses who had made statements which the state intended to use in its case. This list included the name of Nora Wall.

When details of the DPP's report on the blunders in the Nora Wall case were released by the Attorney General's office on 17 November 1999, there were no references to the documentation linking the Chief State Solicitor's Office to both cases. The report failed to explain why the DPP did not want Ms Phelan called as a witness. The DPP's statement said only that she was mistakenly called because prosecuting counsel "failed to recall" an earlier direction not to call her.

In his decision in the judicial review of the original Phelan case on 5 January 1997, Mr Justice McCracken said: "While I have great sympathy for [the two women], I have to say that I was not particularly impressed with their evidence." He added, however, that this was "not a deciding factor" in his decision to prevent the DPP from taking the man to trial.

Liz Allen quoted Fine Gael's justice spokesman, Jim Higgins, as stating that the establishment of this link between the case originally taken by Ms Phelan and the Wall case merited a judicial inquiry "to investigate the role of Gardaí and the Chief State Solicitor's Office." Higgins continued: "There now has to be a full inquiry into the roles of all of the agencies involved, the role of the Chief State Solicitor's Office, the DPP's Office and the Gardaí must be investigated further. We must question the ability of these people to conduct their jobs when such gross incompetence occurred in the Wall case with regard to the inadvertent calling of Ms Phelan as a witness."

Indeed, the close links that existed between personnel involved in the case against Nora Wall and that against the Kilkenny businessman – both involving Patricia Phelan – makes it difficult to understand how Phelan could have been called in error as a witness in the Wall case. The December 2005 judgement of the Court of Criminal Appeal underlined these links when the judges pointed out that "the police officer who had taken Phelan's statement in respect of Nora Wall was the same police officer who investigated the earlier false complaints made by her against her uncle and against the Kilkenny man." However Jim Higgins's calls for an inquiry were ignored and this issue was quickly dropped by the media.

== Summary ==
The case of Nora Wall and Pablo McCabe established a number of extraordinary precedents in Irish law.

1. Nora Wall is the first woman in the history of the State to be convicted of rape;
2. She is the first person in Ireland to receive a life sentence for rape;
3. It was the only case in the history of the Office of the Director of Public Prosecutions that a witness was called contrary to the instructions of the DPP;
4. Regina Walsh said she had recalled the rapes after experiencing "flashbacks". This seems to be the only occasion a conviction was obtained on repressed memory evidence in Ireland. (However in the USA "repressed memory syndrome" has a long and contentious history).

Nora Wall and Pablo McCabe were convicted on 10 June 1999; Regina Walsh gave her famous interview to The Star on 17 June including her allegation about being raped in London; the Kilkenny businessman recognised the name of Patricia Phelan and contacted the defence but still the DPP remained in ignorance of the facts. At the sentencing hearing on 23 July the DPP refused the defence's application for an adjournment and denied that the newly discovered evidence was relevant. Finally Judge Paul Carney made his comments about Nora Wall and gave her an unprecedented sentence of life imprisonment.

== Explanations for miscarriage of justice ==
Nora Wall and Pablo McCabe were originally accused in 1996 shortly after the broadcast by RTÉ of the TV documentary "Dear Daughter" in February of that year; they were convicted in June 1999 one month after RTÉ's broadcast of the States of Fear series produced by Mary Raftery.

It is widely acknowledged that Nora Wall was convicted because of the atmosphere generated by the States of Fear series (see States of Fear subsection below). It is also accepted – not least by Mary Raftery herself – that "Dear Daughter" was an important predecessor to States of Fear. In the book Suffer the Little Children published in November 1999 as a follow up to her TV series, Mary Raftery and her co-author Eoin O'Sullivan wrote:

Dear Daughter concerned the experiences at Goldenbridge Industrial School, Dublin, of Christine Buckley, who grew up there during the 1950s. She had suffered horrific abuse, and descriptions were also given of the systematic ill-treatment of other children by the Sisters of Mercy, who ran the school. These included memories of children being routinely and savagely beaten, having boiling water poured over them, being locked in a furnace room, being forced to stand all night in a corridor as punishment, and very young children being made to sit on potties so long that in some cases their rectums collapsed.

The authors go on to say that "the programme produced an enormous response, most of it horrified at the deeply shocking nature of the abuse outlined," However they also acknowledge that the Sisters of Mercy had their defenders and that after the programme two sisters who were at Goldenbridge gave different accounts of one alleged episode. However they conclude that: "Three years later, the testimony of severe abuse in industrial schools is now so overwhelmingly consistent, that the 'false memory' line of argument has not been repeated in relation to the flood of accounts of abuse during 1999."

Thus Mary Raftery believes that any apparent contradictions brought to light in the controversy that followed "Dear Daughter" were fully ironed out by the States of Fear programmes.

=== "Dear Daughter" ===
In February 1996 RTÉ broadcast "Dear Daughter" – Louis Lentin's TV documentary about alleged abuse in St Vincent's residential school, Goldenbridge, Dublin, which was run by the Sisters of Mercy. It featured the story of Christine Buckley who had been there in the 1950s.

The documentary concentrated on allegations made against one Mercy nun Sister Xavieria. The programme claimed that, on one occasion, Christine Buckley had been caned by Sister Xavieria so severely that the entire side of her leg was split open from her hip to her knee. She said that she was treated in the casualty department of the local hospital and believes that she received 80 to 120 stitches. No medical evidence has ever been produced to support this claim.

The surgeon who ran the casualty department at the hospital has made a statement which renders it highly unlikely that such an incident ever took place. The surgeon pointed out that caning would not have caused a wound of this kind, which would have required surgical treatment under a general anaesthetic and not stitches in a casualty department.

Yet the allegations against the Sisters of Mercy were widely believed at the time. In his essay "States of Fear, the Redress Board and Ireland's Folly", UK cultural historian Richard Webster states that "in the wake of the broadcast, atrocity stories about Goldenbridge and other industrial schools began to proliferate".

Nora Wall and Pablo McCabe were accused by Regina Walsh within months of the broadcast of "Dear Daughter". Her "witness" Patricia Phelan accused the Kilkenny businessman of rape at about the same time. It was his testimony that would eventually cause the collapse of the case against Wall and McCabe.

=== States of Fear ===
In April and May 1999 RTÉ broadcast a much more extensive three-part documentary series, States of fear, which was written, produced and directed by Mary Raftery. The programmes portrayed the industrial schools as part of a chaotic and Dickensian child-care system, which was run by the Catholic Church and funded by the state. The programmes also featured a series of claims by former residents of the schools that they had been physically or sexually abused by members of orders such as the Christian Brothers, the Sisters of Mercy and the Sisters of Charity. References were also made to a number of unexplained deaths which allegedly took place in these schools.

The series provoked a huge public response. As Raftery herself puts it, "Outrage at the crimes committed against these children was expressed continuously for the three weeks of the series, across acres of newsprint and hours of radio broadcasts all over the country." During the course of this outbreak of outrage the religious orders were demonized. The following is an extract from an article by Irish journalist Stephen Dodd on 9 May 1999, entitled "Church Needs Public Exorcism Over Abuse"

In Australia, hundreds of orphaned children were flogged, beaten and sexually abused at a Sisters of Mercy orphanage in Queensland. The regime of abuse is believed to have lasted 90 years. One child was said to have been burned with a red-hot poker to exorcise the devil. A nun pulled out another child's ingrown toenails with a pair of pliers. Girls were raped by priests and male workers. Some became pregnant and miscarried. It is alleged that foetuses were flushed down lavatories to cover up the crimes.

The final programme in the series was broadcast on 11 May 1999. Nora Wall and Pablo McCabe were convicted of rape on 10 June.

Carol Coulter, legal affairs correspondent for the Irish Times wrote on 1 December 2005 that "[The case] took place at a time of heightened sensitivity to the problem of the sexual abuse of children in institutions, especially those run by religious orders. The RTÉ series States of Fear had ended a month earlier, generating widespread debate and indignation." An Irish Times editorial on 17 December 2005 entitled "Nora Wall" stated that:

The charges were laid at a time when allegations of the abuse of children in institutions had entered the public domain. The case was heard within a month of the broadcast by RTÉ of the States of Fear programmes. The jury could not but have been affected, it seems, by the horrific abuse exposed in that series and by the complaints of the child victims that no-one listened to them.

Wall told teacher and religious affairs journalist Breda O'Brien that she has no doubt that the atmosphere generated by States of Fear was a central factor in the jury's willingness to believe the allegations. In addition, the opinion of the Irish Times is significant as in 1999 Mary Raftery was both a columnist for the Times and a senior producer/director with RTÉ.

The focus on the States of Fear programmes may explain why, apart from news reports on trial days, RTÉ's coverage of the scandal was confined to a 30-minute programme in the Would You Believe series on 11 January 2000.

On 28 November 1999, the Sunday Independent published an article entitled "Judge reflects a nation's outrage" by columnist Emer O'Kelly. The title refers to the sentencing by Judge Anthony Murphy of a Brother of Charity to 36 years imprisonment for the physical and sexual abuse of children. However the article contains these words about the Nora Wall case:

When the former Mercy nun Nora Wall was vindicated, and an announcement was made that she was not to be retried for rape, there was an outcry from some members of the public about the way she had been vilified before her conviction was set aside. The horrible reality of our society is that so many appalling crimes of abuse of children by Catholic religious have been proved in the courts that many people are inclined to believe that no cleric, man or woman, accused of such crimes can possibly be innocent. And that is not the fault of public opinion. It is in large measure the fault of the religious authorities who seem more concerned with limiting the damage to their own reputations and standing than in acknowledging their collective guilt and active negligence.
