= Murder of Mary Gough =

2001 murder of Irish woman

Mary Gough
- Born: Dublin, Ireland
- Died: 28 February 2001

The murder of Mary Gough (also known as the "Staircase Murder") occurred in 2001 in Balbriggan, County Dublin, Ireland. Her husband, Colin Whelan, was convicted and sentenced to life imprisonment after investigators concluded that Gough had been strangled and her death had been staged to appear as an accidental fall.

== Background ==
Gough was originally from Stamullen, County Meath. She began a relationship with Whelan in 1993 and they were married in 2000. Around June 2000, Whelan doubled their life insurance policy so that each partner would receive a payout of IR£400,000 if the other died within 10 years. Between setting up the policy and carrying out the murder, Whelan made out numerous internet searches relating to asphyxiation, strangulation, choking, and "how long to take to die from asphyxiation."

== Murder ==
On the night of 28 February or early 1 March 2001, Whelan strangled Gough at their home at 49 Clonard Street, Balbriggan. Whelan then placed her body at the bottom of the staircase and called emergency services, claiming Gough had fallen down the stairs. Paramedics and medical staff raised immediate doubts as Mary was unusually cold to the touch, and her injuries were not consistent with a fall.

A post-mortem by the State pathologist found ligature marks on her neck and there were no head injuries characteristic of a staircase fall. The cause of death was ruled as asphyxiation by strangulation, likely with the belt of a dressing gown. Investigators discovered blood staining in the master bedroom and on the landing. Forensic examination found the dressing gown belt with traces of blood. In addition, traces of scratch marks on Whelan's chest (observed when Mary was taken to hospital) suggested a physical struggle.

== Investigation and arrest ==
A month after the murder, Whelan was formally criminally charged. In March 2003, seven months before his trial was due, he faked his own death by abandoning his car and clothes at the cliffs of Howth Head and fled to Mallorca, Spain. In Spain he assumed a false identity, believed to be "Martin Sweeney" or "Cian", and worked in a bar frequented by Irish and British holiday-makers. He was eventually spotted by an Irish tourist in July 2004 and extradited back to Ireland.

Once back in custody, investigators analysed his computer and discovered dozens of incriminating internet searches about strangulation and death by asphyxiation, evidence which undermined his account of what happened.

== Verdict and aftermath ==
On 12 April 2005, at the Central Criminal Court in Dublin, Whelan pleaded guilty to the murder of Mary Gough. He was sentenced to mandatory life imprisonment. The presiding judge, Justice Paul Carney, described the crime as "the most calculated and callous killing" he had ever encountered. During sentencing, Whelan expressed "sorrow for taking Mary away from her family," admitted to being a "person of cowardice," and said he accepted full responsibility. In victim impact statements, Gough's family described living with a "life sentence" of grief.

The case shocked Ireland, drawing attention both for the brutality of the crime and for the planning and deception involved, including premeditated insurance fraud, internet research into murder methods, and Whelan's attempt to escape justice abroad. The murder remains a reference point in discussions of domestic violence, wife-killing, and the misuse of life insurance for criminal gain. The case has been the subject of true-crime documentaries, such as the television documentray Getting Away With Murder: The Killing of Mary Gough, in which family members discuss the impact of her loss.
