= Jason Solomons =

British film critic

- Born: 16 October 1969 (age 55)
- Occupation(s): Film critic, journalist, broadcaster, author
- Spouse: Tessa Solomons
- Children: 2
- Website: www.jasonsolomons.com

Jason Solomons (born 16 October 1969) is a British film critic, journalist, broadcaster and author.

== Career ==
Solomons is a critic who has appeared on BBC News, Sky News and BBC Radio and is the former chairman of the London Film Critics' Circle. He hosted Movie Talk in 2016, an interview series on Sky Arts and has presented a film slot on BBC Radio London's Robert Elms show for more than 15 years. He is a regular reporter on red carpets, has presented Virgin Atlantic's in-flight entertainment show and has attended every Cannes Film Festival since 1997, when he also began his Trailer Trash column, the first dedicated film diary and gossip column in British newspapers, for The Observer newspaper. Solomons' book, Woody Allen: Film By Film (Carlton Books), was published in 2015. His latest film and documentary reviews and interviews can be found on his website.

== Early life ==
Solomons attended Merchant Taylors' School in the Three Rivers district of Hertfordshire. He studied French and German at Trinity College, Oxford and lived in Paris for a year. After Oxford, Solomons took a postgraduate course in journalism at City University, London before beginning his career as a journalist and the first graduate trainee at The Daily Express. There, he became showbiz editor and then film critic, before leaving in 1998 for The Mail on Sunday.
