= TV50 =

Series of special events (RTÉ Television)

TV50 was a series of special events throughout 2012, celebrating the 50th anniversary of the launch of RTÉ Television, then known as Telefís Éireann, on 31 December 1961.

== Launch ==
TV50 was officially launched on 26 December 2011 when a pre-launch placeholder website went online at RTÉ. The full TV50 site went live at noon on New Year's Eve 2011. The broadcaster intended TV50 to be a year-long celebration. The festivities saw as many as twenty archive programmes launched each month on RTÉ Player.

== List of TV50 programmes ==
The following is a list of programmes broadcast under the TV50 label.

Date	Programme	Description
31 December 2011	New Year's Eve Show Live	A special programme of music and chat presented by Miriam O'Callaghan. The programme promoted many of the upcoming TV50 events.
1 January 2012	Kneeling in the Years	Mary Kennedy and Fr. Dermod McCarthy look at the role of televised worship
1 January 2012	The Entertainers	Documentary looking back at 50 years of entertainment
2 January 2012	Country Brass – Cork Butter Exchange Band	Documentary first aired in 1979 following a Cork brass band
2 January 2012	Rural Portrait: King of the Road	First broadcast in 1968, this is a profile of Michael Cleary, a road-worker from near Cahir in County Tipperary and his father
2 January 2012	50 Years in the Glow	Pat Shortt explores the history of RTÉ through the eyes of the viewers and the importance of television in the lives of ordinary people and families
2 January 2012	The Philip Lynott Archive	Profile of the Thin Lizzy frontman, exploring his life and career
3 January 2012	Terminus: Gola Island	Documentary from 1970 highlighting the magic island of the song
3 January 2012	Oileán: Anam Cloch	Broadcast in 2008 as part of the Oileán series, this show brings us up to date with Gola Island
5 January 2012	A Little Bit TV	The first in a series of eight profiles of well-known television presenters: Bill O'Herlihy
5 January 2012	John Molloy's Dublin	Actor John Molloy provides a combination of comedy sketches and mime in a specially restored and remastered programme from 1976
5 January 2012	Self-Portrait – Sylvia Beach	An archive interview from 1962 with Sylvia Beach
6 January 2012	Scope – the Four Roads	A 1973 film which follows the life of 70-year-old Winnie Mongan
6 January 2012	Wheels of the World – Life in North Kerry	Filmed in 1974, this documentary captures the sounds and rhythms of rural life
12 January 2012	A Little Bit TV	The second in a series of eight profiles of well-known television presenters: Gráinne Seoige
19 January 2012	A Little Bit TV	The third in a series of eight profiles of well-known television presenters: Bunny Carr
26 January 2012	A Little Bit TV	The fourth in a series of eight profiles of well-known television presenters: Bláthnaid Ní Chofaigh
February 2012	Music Makers Month	Classic performances from Boyzone, Paul Brady, Joe Dolan, The Dubliners, Rory Gallagher, Horslips, Dolores Keane, Christy Moore and Westlife
2 February 2012	A Little Bit TV	The fifth in a series of eight profiles of well-known television presenters: Derek Davis
9 February 2012	A Little Bit TV	The sixth in a series of eight profiles of well-known television presenters: Mark Cagney
April 2012	Children's Classics Month	
TBA	Into the Light: the Battles that Shaped Our TV	The first in a two-part series in which John Bowman charts RTÉ's relationship with church and state
TBA	Into the Light: the Battles that Shaped Our TV	The second in a two-part series in which John Bowman charts RTÉ's relationship with church and state
22 July 2012	Weather Permitting	Why are the Irish so obsessed with the weather?
23 July 2012	Battle Station	Featuring John Bowman
24 July 2012	Battle Station	Featuring John Bowman
21 October 2012	Fleadh Cheoil Thurles	The Fleadh Cheoil na hÉireann at Thurles in 1965
22 October 2012	Flights of Fancy World of the Pigeon Men	Margaret Gleeson's 1985 documentary offering a revealing insight into the world of pigeon fanciers as they prepare for a big race.
22 October 2012	What's Happening to Television?	A one-hour documentary on the future of TV, presented by Miriam O'Callaghan.
22 October 2012	Bells and Blue Berets	John Skehan's 1966 Christmas visit to Irish UN troops in Cyprus.
23 October 2012	Isles of Aran	Louis Lentin's documentary revealing life in the Aran Islands in 1963 before mass tourism, new employment initiatives and the building of an airstrip helped the islanders to modernise.
24 October 2012	Country Brass Boherbuoy Brass and Reed Band	A film highlighting the Boherbuoy Brass and Reed Band, including its respect for musical traditions and reverence for the landscape of urban Limerick.
24 October 2012	Maam Cross	The impact of a poor day of trading at a County Galway horse fair in 1990, presented by Mairéad Ní Nuadháin.
26 October 2012	Lifestyle: Living Like Lords	1971 documentary examining the lifestyles and West of Ireland ancestral homes of three Irish lords, with Cathal O'Shannon.
4 December 2012	The Radharc Squad	Part one of a two-part documentary revealing the story of film-making priests who planned to project a Catholic influence by offering programmes to Telefís Éireann.
6 December 2012	Radharc: Down and Out in Dublin	A story of social exclusion in Dublin, exploring the lives of people who slept rough on the capital's streets. First broadcast in 1964.
11 December 2012	The Radharc Squad	Concluding part of a documentary revealing the story of a group of film-making priests, featuring selections from the Radharc Archive and interviews with key figures.
13 December 2012	Radharc: Pain Is the Price	A classic episode of the documentary series exploring the work of missionary priest Shay Cullen, a priest who was nominated for the Nobel Peace Prize three times.
18 December 2012	Stripped	Broadcast on RTÉ Two, Stripped won the RTÉ TV Documentary Unit/Filmbase TV50 "Doc on the Box" award. It follows a week in the life of 29-year-old Sligo bodybuilder Joe Gallagher who, jobless and in negative equity, becomes a stripper for birthdays, hen parties and nightclubs.
20 December 2012	God on the Box	Contributors including Alice Taylor, David Quinn, Arthur Matthews, Patsy McGarry, Biddy White Lennon, David McSavage, Bill O'Herlihy and Maureen Gaffney look back at the impact of fifty years of TV on religion in Ireland. This was also the last TV50 programme broadcast before the Mayan apocalypse.
23 December 2012	The School Around the Corner	The only known copy of the original series of the show, first broadcast exactly fifty years ago on this day.
27 December 2012	Nighthawks Rehashed	
28 December 2012	Sup as an Tobar	
30 December 2012	Weather Permitting	Repeat of programme broadcast earlier in the year.

== Associated events ==
=== Books ===
- Window and Mirror: RTÉ Television 1961–2011

=== Nationwide search ===
There was a nationwide search initiated by RTÉ.

=== Doc on the Box ===
RTÉ described this as "a forward-looking initiative designed to encourage a fresh, emerging voice in video documentary direction and production". However, it was only open to those over the age of eighteen years and with experience.

== See also ==
- 2012 in Irish television
