= James Carney (scholar) =

Irish Celtic studies scholar

James Patrick Carney (17 May 1914 – 7 July 1989) was a noted Irish Celtic scholar.

He was born in Portlaoise, County Laois and was educated at the Christian Brothers school in Synge Street, Dublin. He took his degree at University College Dublin in 1935, before going to Bonn University to study under Rudolf Thurneysen.

On returning to Dublin, Carney worked under Osborn Bergin, Gerard Murphy, Richard Irvine Best and T. F. O'Rahilly. He pioneered an approach to early Irish texts which focused on their literary merit and their affinities with the other literatures of the medieval world. His Studies in Irish Literature and History which appeared in 1956 challenged the 'nativist' approach to Irish literature which had dominated the scholarship of the previous decades. His work on Saint Patrick also proved controversial. Carney had controversial views that Christianity had in fact been an overthrow of the pagan druidic order. The 1955 publication of James Carney's ‘Studies in Irish Literature and History’ was seen as the beginning point of the late-twentieth century ‘anti-nativist’ movement. The group for the first time promoted the idea that very little can be known of the earlier oral tradition of the Irish, since all that remains are Christian texts written by Christian clergy and that these clergy were not sympathetic to, but critical of paganism.

He was attached to the Dublin Institute for Advanced Studies from its foundation by Éamon de Valera in 1940 and became Professor of Irish there. From 1950–1952 he was visiting professor at Uppsala University where he and his wife founded a Department of Celtic Studies. He was awarded an honorary doctorate by that institution in 1975. In 1959, he was appointed member of the Royal Society of the Humanities at Uppsala.

== Writings ==
James Carney along with Eoin MacNeill put forward the theory that Ogham was first created as a cryptic alphabet or secret language designed by the Irish at the time of Roman invasion and rule. Both historians believed that the Irish designed it in response to political, military and/or religious reasons so that those with knowledge of just Latin could not read it. Carney identified the genealogies of the Kerry poet Luccreth moccu Chiara back to the ancient people of Cíarraige, he provided extensive research on his poem Conailla Medb Míchuru’ ("Medb enjoined evil contracts"), which contains the oldest surviving reference to characters and events from the Ulster Cycle and it is strongly connected to the Táin Bó Cúailnge saga.

He was married to Maura Morrissey, also an academic and a member of the Royal Irish Academy, who predeceased him in 1975. The couple had a son, Paul, who was a judge in the Irish High Court.

== Select publications ==
- Topographical Poems by Seán Mór Ó Dubhagáin and Giolla na Naomh Ó hUuidrain, editor, (1943)
- Poems on the Butlers of Ormond, Cahir and Dunboyne, AD 1400-1650, editor, (1945)
- A Genealogical History of the O’Reillys, from Irish of Eoghan Ó Raghallaigh, editor, (1950)
- Studies in Irish Literature and History (1956)
- The Problem of St Patrick (1961)
- Early Irish Poetry (1965)
- Medieval Irish Lyrics (1967)
- The Irish Bardic Poet (1967)
- Poems on the O’Reillys, editor, (1970)
