= Cardinal Secrets =

Irish television documentary

"Cardinal Secrets" is a 2002 Prime Time special produced by Mary Raftery and reported on by Mick Peelo. Its broadcast on RTÉ Television led to the setting up of the Murphy Commission of Investigation into clerical abuse in the Dublin Archdiocese which published the Murphy Report in 2009. Anger at the Catholic Church's handling of clerical sex abuse was reported to have reached a zenith following the broadcast of "Cardinal Secrets".

It revealed how the then Archbishop of Dublin Desmond Connell (since made cardinal) had (a) covered up the defrocking of two priests the church had concluded had been involved in sexual abuse, (b) later failed to give information about these priests to investigators (c) written a "clean" reference for a priest alleged to have committed sexual abuse of children.

== See also ==
- States of Fear
