= Rick O'Shea =

Irish radio personality (born 1973)

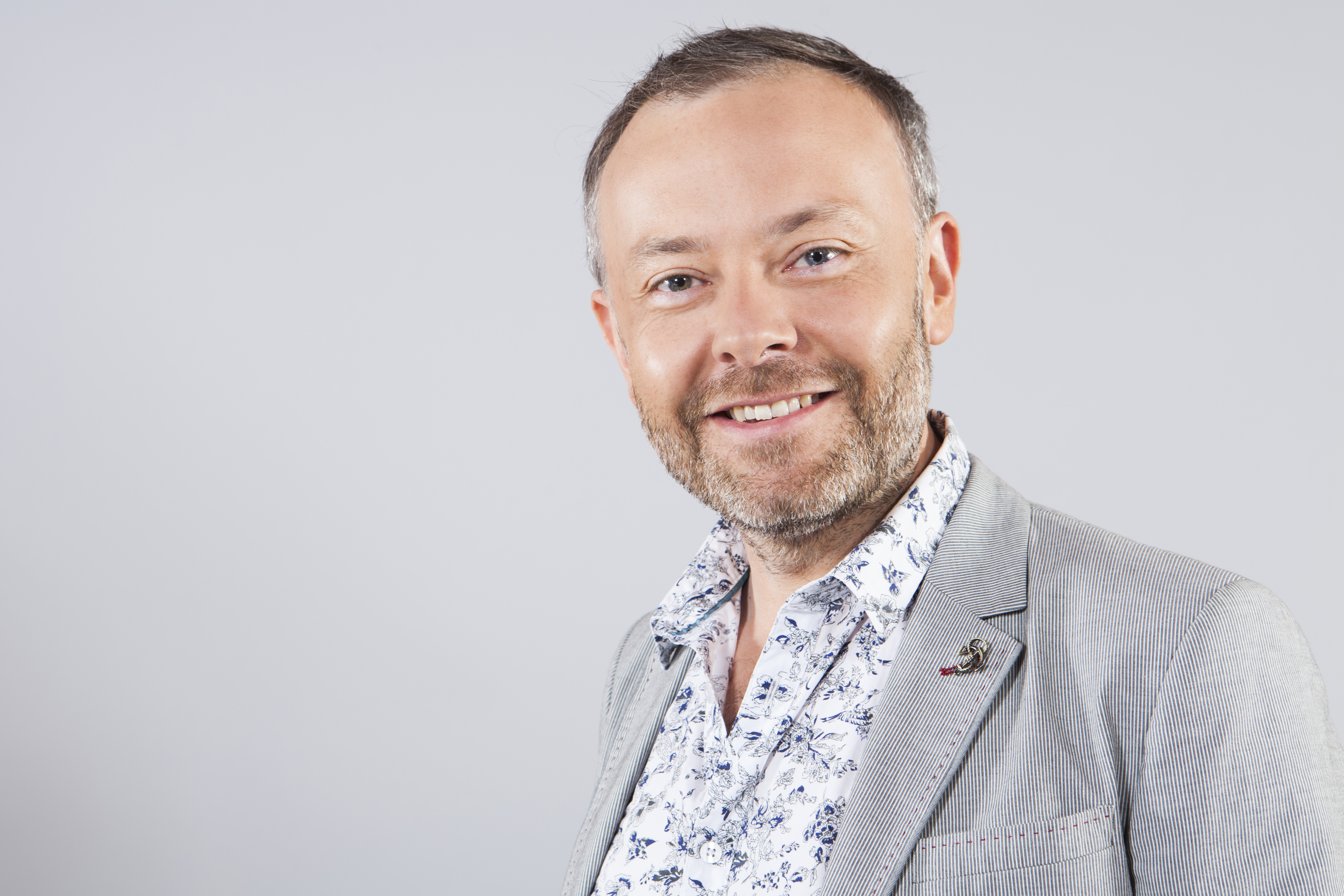
- Broadcaster Rick O'Shea, 2019
- Born: Paul Crossan; 7 May 1973 (age 53); Drimnagh, Dublin
- Education: University College Dublin
- Occupation: Broadcaster
- Employer: RTÉ
- Known for: Daytime Radio Show; Books; Cinema
- Website: Personal weblog

Paul Crossan (born 7 May 1973) is an Irish radio personality, known as Rick O'Shea. He was born in Drimnagh, Dublin, grew up in Crumlin, and attended Drimnagh Castle Secondary School and University College Dublin.

He was a presenter on RTÉ 2fm from 2001 to 2017. O'Shea also presented The Poetry Programme on RTÉ Radio 1 in 2015 and 2016. In 2026, he was announced as the new host of Arena, RTÉ Radio 1's daily arts show.

== Activities ==
Before joining RTÉ 2fm in 2001, he had worked for East Coast Radio, Atlantic 252, South East Radio and FM104. Rick had previously been involved with hospital radio. O'Shea presented the weekday afternoon show on 2fm until 2015, when the show was moved to the weekend schedule.

He presented The Poetry Programme on RTÉ Radio 1 in 2015 and 2016.

O'Shea was diagnosed with epilepsy at the age of 16. and has been a patron of Epilepsy Ireland, formerly known as Brainwave, the Irish Epilepsy Association, since 2006. He represented the charity in an Irish celebrity version of the quiz show Mastermind in 2012, winning the competition.

He runs the Rick O’Shea Book Club, Ireland's largest book club, with over 43,000 members, and recommends the Eason Must Reads lists four times a year with author Sinéad Moriarty. He is currently presenting Arena on RTÉ Radio 1.

== Awards and nominations ==
O'Shea has been nominated for Best Irish Radio DJ at the Meteor Music Awards on three occasions, in 2002, 2008 and 2009. In 2009, he was winner of Entertainment.ie's "Sexiest Radio Voice" award.
