= States of Fear =

1999 television series

States of Fear is a documentary series produced by Mary Raftery and broadcast on the Irish television channel Raidió Teilifís Éireann (RTÉ) between April and May 1999.

The film detailed abuse suffered by children between the 1930s and 1970s in the state childcare system of Ireland, primarily in the Reformatory and Industrial Schools. After public outcry, Irish Taoiseach Bertie Ahern apologised on behalf of the State.

The Commission to Inquire into Child Abuse was established in 2000 and delivered its Report in May 2009.

A 2005 editorial in The Irish Times suggested that the documentary influenced jury members and played a role in the miscarriage of justice against Nora Wall.

== See also ==
- Cardinal Secrets
