= Michael Murphy (journalist) =

Irish journalist and author

- Born: Castlebar, County Mayo, Ireland
- Occupations: Newsreader, psychoanalyst, author
- Employer: RTÉ
- Partner(s): Terry O'Sullivan (civil union, 2011)
- Website: http://www.michaelmurphyauthor.com

Michael Murphy (born 1947) is an Irish journalist, newsreader, psychoanalyst and author. He works for RTÉ and is considered "one of the most popular voices on radio".

Murphy is from Castlebar, County Mayo, and has lectured at St. Vincent's University Hospital and University College Dublin (UCD). He was diagnosed with prostate cancer in 2007. He published his autobiography, At Five in the Afternoon: My Battle with Male Cancer, in 2009. He presented a television series called The Big Story 2 6 week part series from 2009 to 2010, which was shortlisted for the 2010 Bord Gáis Energy Irish Book Awards. In June 2011, Murphy registered a civil partnership with his partner of 26 years, Terry O'Sullivan, a psychotherapist, at a ceremony in Dublin.
