= A Little Bit TV =

- Genre: Documentary
- Narrated by: Marty Morrissey
- Country of origin: Ireland
- Original language: English
- No. of series: 1
- No. of episodes: 8

Production
- Running time: 30 minutes

Original release
- Network: RTÉ One
- Release: 5 January – 23 February 2012

A Little Bit TV is an Irish documentary series that is airing on RTÉ. Made as part of the broadcaster's TV50 celebrations, in each episode, a well-known RTÉ presenter is profiled in detail.

== History ==
A Little Bit TV is the fifth incarnation of the A Little Bit... series of television programmes. In 2005 the first series, A Little Bit Country, profiled a well-known performer in the country and Irish music genre. Three years later in 2008 A Little Bit Showband profiled some of the most popular showbands from the 1960s. The following year A Little Bit Funny profiled some of the most popular comedians from yesteryear. In 2011 A Little Bit Eurovision looked at Ireland's close links with the Eurovision Song Contest. The Following year RTÉ Television celebrated its golden jubilee and the fifth incarnation, A Little Bit TV, began profiling some of the most well-known television presenters from fifty years of television in Ireland.

== Transmissions ==
=== Series One (2012) ===
Show	Broadcast date	Subject
1	5 January	Bill O'Herlihy
2	12 January	Gráinne Seoige
3	19 January	Bunny Carr
4	26 January	Bláthnaid Ní Chofaigh
5	2 February	Derek Davis
6	9 February	Mark Cagney
7	16 February	Theresa Lowe
8	23 February	Seán Duignan
