= Mastermind (Irish game show) =

Irish version of a British television quiz show

- Created by: Bill Wright
- Directed by: Simon Gibney
- Presented by: Nora Owen
- Country of origin: Ireland

Production
- Running time: 30 minutes

Original release
- Network: TV3

Mastermind is an Irish television quiz show that aired on TV3 as part of its autumn/winter 2011 schedule. The show was licensed to TV3 through BBC Worldwide.

The show was based on Bill Wright's concept, which first aired on BBC One in 1972. The BBC show had a reputation for its challenging questions and air of seriousness, and an intimidating. The Irish version of the show was hosted by Nora Owen, a former Irish Fine Gael politician.

== Broadcast ==
The show was broadcast on TV3 as 'Celebrity Mastermind' in June/July 2012. A series of 'Junior Mastermind' episodes followed in November/December 2012. Irish radio personality Rick O'Shea was the winner of the celebrity edition, earning €5,000 for his chosen charity, Brainwave - The Irish Epilepsy Association.

== Format ==
The format directly mimicked the original British edition of the programme. Each contestant had two minutes per round, and two rounds to complete. First, each contestant in turn answered a question on a specialised subject which they had pre-chosen. The contestant could pass if they did not know the answer, rather than guessing. If a question was answered incorrectly, the questioner would give the answer, consuming time. However, if 'pass' was chosen, then the answer was read at the end of the round. After the two minutes a buzzer was sounded, made up of four beeps; if a question was being read (or had just been read), then the contestant was given a short period of time to answer, leading to the show's famous catchphrase, "I've started so I'll finish." After this, answers to any passes were given.

After contestants had answered the specialised questions, they were given general knowledge questions. For the 2010/11 series this round lasted 2 minutes, 30 seconds, rather than the usual 2 minutes. As originally aired, the contestants would return for the second round in the same order as for their specialised subjects (contestants are now recalled in reverse order of points scored).

The winner was the contestant with the most points. If two or more contestants had an equal number of points, then the contestant with the fewer passes was declared the winner. The possibility of passing lead to tactical play, as passing uses less time, allowing more questions to be answered, but in the event of a tie, passes counted against the contestant at the end.

Should the top two contestants achieve the same score and the same number of passes, then a tie-breaker was employed, in which the two contenders are each asked the same five questions (one contender having to leave the auditorium while the other answered). It was not clear what would happen should this fail to produce a clear winner, though it was implied that the process would simply be repeated as many times as necessary.

The winner went through to the next round, where he had to choose a different specialised subject. The winner of the final was declared "Mastermind" for that series and year and would be the only contestant to receive a prize, in the form of a cut-glass engraved bowl.
