= Movie Talk =

Irish television programme

- Country of origin: Ireland
- Original language: English
- No. of series: 1
- No. of episodes: 10

Production
- Production locations: RTÉ Television Centre, Donnybrook, Dublin 4, Ireland
- Camera setup: Multi-camera
- Running time: 30 minutes

Original release
- Network: RTÉ One
- Release: September 2012 – November 2012

Movie Talk is an Irish television programme broadcast on RTÉ One from September to November 2012. The ten part series profiled figures from the Irish film world who talk about their careers in movies.

== Episodes ==
- Programme 1 – Brendan Gleeson
- Programme 2 – Fionnula Flanagan
- Programme 3 – Jim Sheridan
- Programme 4 – Anjelica Huston
- Programme 5 – John Boorman
- Programme 6 – Saoirse Ronan
- Programme 7 – Neil Jordan
- Programme 8 – Gabriel Byrne
- Programme 9 – Noel Pearson
- Programme 10 – John Moore
