= Paul Carney =

Judge of the High Court
- In office 12 April 1991 – 24 April 2015
- Nominated by: Government of Ireland
- Appointed by: Mary Robinson

Personal details
- Born: 27 April 1943 Dublin, Ireland
- Died: 24 September 2015 (aged 72) Dublin, Ireland
- Spouse: Marjorie Young (m. 1969)
- Children: 4
- Education: University College Dublin; King's Inns

Paul Carney (27 April 1943 – 24 September 2015) was an Irish judge who served as a Judge of the High Court from 1991 to 2015. He was the presiding judge of its criminal division, in the Central Criminal Court.

== Early life and education ==
Carney was born in Dublin in 1943. Carney was a former student of Gonzaga College, and a graduate of University College Dublin and King's Inns. He was called to the Bar in 1966. Both his parents were academics and founded a Department of Celtic Studies at the University of Uppsala, Sweden.

Before being appointed a judge, Paul Carney was a member of the Progressive Democrats.

== Judicial career ==
He was regarded as a leading expert on Irish criminal law and presided over murder and rape trials since his appointment to the High Court in 1991. Carney, as the "listing judge" of the criminal division of the High Court and the only judge permanently assigned to the Central Criminal Court, heard seven out of every 10 rape cases and over half of all murder trials in Ireland.

Carney retired from the bench on 24 April 2015 and died on 24 September 2015 at the age of 72.

== Other activities ==
In May 2006, he was appointed an adjunct professor of the Faculty of Law in University College Cork. Additionally, in September 2008, he was appointed an adjunct professor of the Department of Law and Business at NUI Maynooth.

== Controversies ==
=== Wearing of wigs ===
His views on many issues were controversial, and his insistence upon wigs being worn and titles used in public courtrooms that he was serving in resulted in his being rebuked by his superiors.

=== Patrick O’Brien bail ===
On 21 January 2013, Carney sentenced 72-year-old sex offender Patrick O’Brien to 12 years in jail with nine years suspended for raping and sexually assaulting his daughter. Carney then granted the convicted man bail pending an appeal, which was considered by legal commentators to be "very unusual" since bail is usually only granted before someone is sentenced. Three days later Carney revoked the bail, and apologised and admitted he was wrong and insensitive to the victim.
