= Mary Raftery =

Irish investigative journalist

- Born: Mary Frances Thérèse Raftery; 21 December 1957; Dublin, Ireland
- Died: 10 January 2012 (aged 54); St. Vincent's University Hospital, Dublin, Ireland
- Occupations: Filmmaker, writer
- Known for: States of Fear, Cardinal Secrets
- Spouse: David Waddell
- Children: One

Mary Frances Thérèse Raftery (21 December 1957 – 10 January 2012) was an Irish investigative journalist, filmmaker and writer.

Raftery was born in Dublin. She started her investigative journalism career with In Dublin magazine in the 1970s, before moving on to Magill magazine and then to Irish television channel Raidió Teilifís Éireann (RTÉ) in 1984. Her documentary series States of Fear was broadcast on RTÉ in 1999. A book she wrote later that year called Suffer the Little Children added more detail to her claim that the Irish childcare system between the 1930s and 1970s was guilty of widespread persecution and abuse. In 2000, the Commission to Inquire into Child Abuse was established by the Irish Government to examine the evidence: its Report was published in May 2009. Her programme "Cardinal Secrets" was broadcast as a Prime Time special on RTÉ in 2002. It led to the setting up of the Murphy Commission of Investigation into clerical abuse in the Dublin Archdiocese which published the Murphy Report in 2009.

She was nominated for "NNI National Journalist of the Year" in 2011 for her work in exposing clerical abuse of children.

Raftery died of ovarian cancer at St. Vincent's University Hospital on 10 January 2012, aged 54. An article that appeared in February 2012 in The Irish Times referred to her as "the most important journalist of the past 30 years".

== Writing ==
- Raftery, Mary; O'Sullivan, Eoin (1999). Suffer The Little Children. Dublin, Ireland: New Island. ISBN 9781874597834.
- Raftery, Mary (2013). Do They Think We're Eejits?. Dublin, Ireland: The Irish Times. ISBN 9780907011378.
