= William Leman =

William Leman may refer to:

- Sir William Leman, 1st Baronet
- Sir William Leman, 2nd Baronet
- Sir William Leman, 3rd Baronet of the Leman baronets
