= Chamber Street =

Street in east London

Coordinates: 51°30′40.04″N 0°4′14.63″W

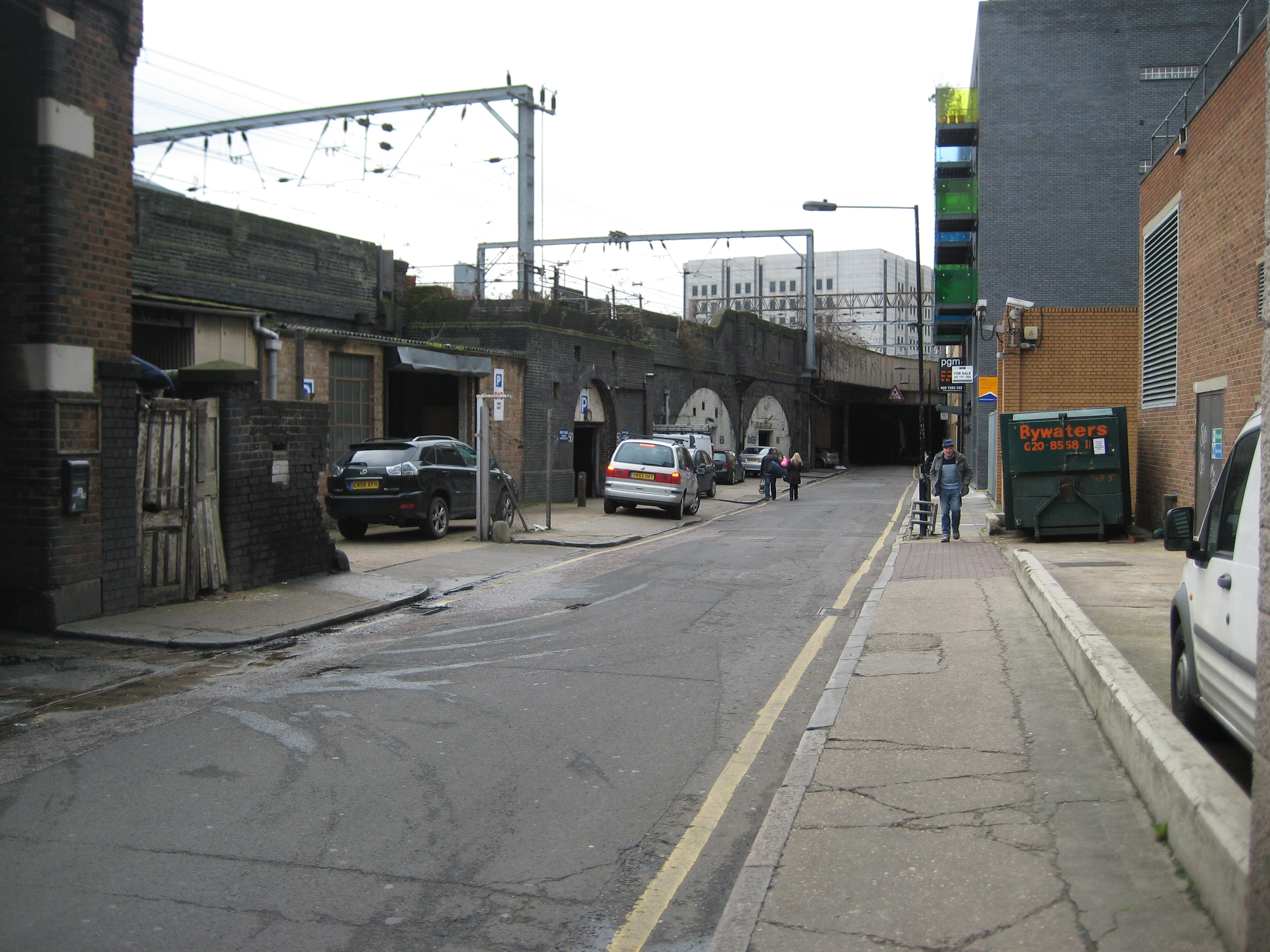
Chamber Street in 2010

Chamber Street, once known as Chambers Street, is in the London Borough of Tower Hamlets in east London. It runs between Mansell Street in the west and Leman Street in the east, parallel with Prescot Street to the North and the London, Tilbury and Southend line to the south.

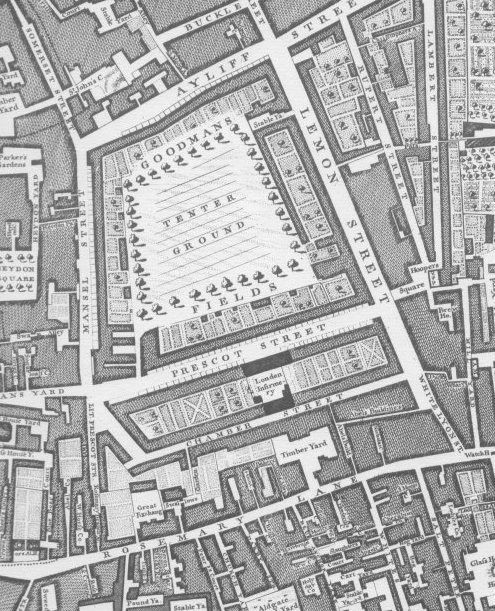
Chamber Street (centre) on John Rocque's Map of London, 1746

The London Infirmary was on the north side of Chamber Street, and the south side of Prescot Street, until it moved to Whitechapel Road in 1757 and became the London Hospital.

The site of Abel's Buildings, (also known as White's Buildings), is now occupied by a Travelodge Hotel. Its name is sometimes given to an alley that runs under the Docklands Light Railway between Royal Mint Street (previously known as Rosemary Lane) and Chamber Street. Directly opposite to the Travelodge on the north side of the street is the back of the Grade II listed former Cooperative Wholesale Society building, once known as "The Tea House". Designed by L. G. Ekins, the building is "..an unusual example in Britain of the German Expressionist style."

Leading from the north side of the road is Yeoman's Yard (backing on to the headquarters of the Royal College of Psychiatrists), and further to the east is Magdelen Passage, leading to Prescot Street, where an undeveloped bomb site from World War II can still be seen. The Magdalen House for Reception of Penitent Prostitutes which opened in 1758, took over from the London Infirmary.

At its junction with Mansell Street, Chamber Street runs partially under the railway lines. Here the abandoned arches of the old spur line to the London and Blackwell Railway Haydon Square goods yard (built in the 1850s) can still be seen, though they are currently under threat of demolition as part of a hotel extension project. The brick wall is a rare surviving example of shrapnel damage from World War II. Until September 2019 Barneys Seafood, the last jellied eel company in Whitechapel, was at 55 Chamber Street in the railway arches, a site it had occupied since 1969. The business has now moved to Billingsgate.
