= Prescot Street =

Street in the London Borough of Tower Hamlets

Coordinates: 51°30′41.9″N 0°4′15.57″W

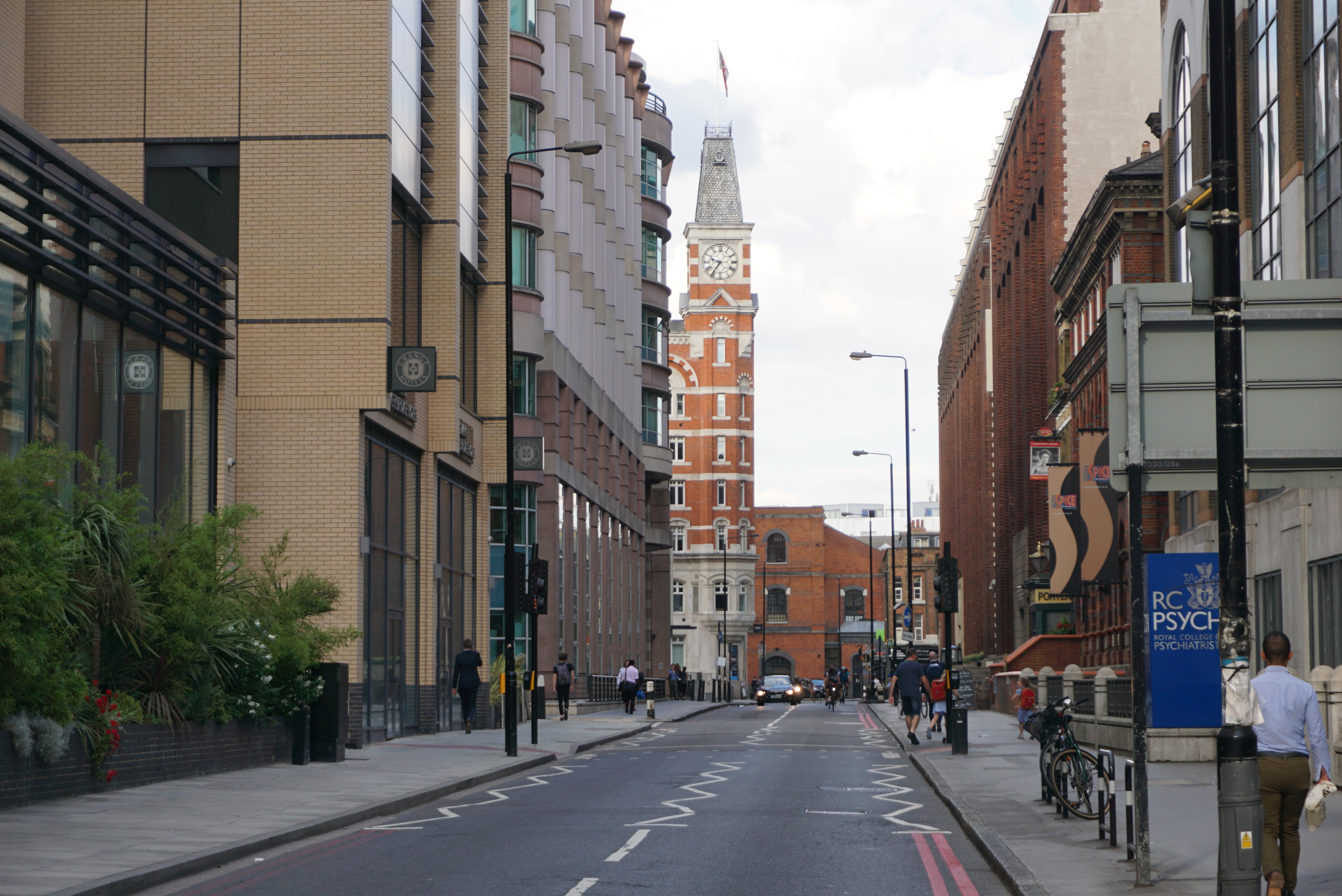
Prescot Street in 2017

Prescot Street is a street in Whitechapel in the London Borough of Tower Hamlets. It runs between Goodman's Yard and Mansell Street in the west and Leman Street in the east.

Prescot Street, together with Ayliff Street (now Alie Street), Leman Street and Mansell Street, were built up in the seventeenth century as part of the development of Goodman's Fields by William Leman. Prescot was the maiden name of Leman's mother Rebecca.

In the early 2000s, the street was part of a large archaeological dig which uncovered large quantities of remains from the Roman period. The finds were on the site where the Leonardo Royal Hotel now stands, and formed part of the East London Roman Cemetery. Roman funeral urns were first discovered here in 1678.

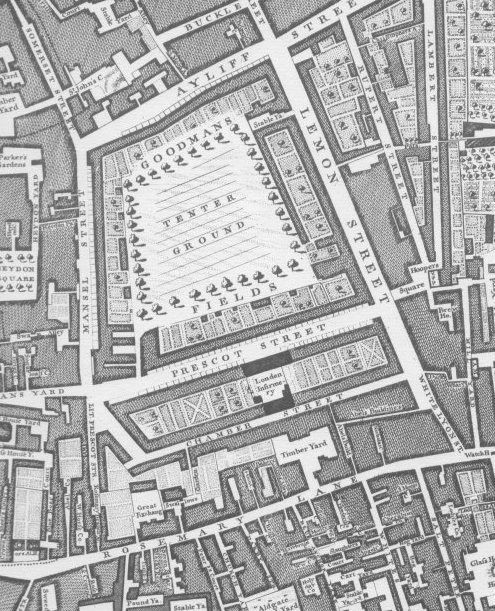
Prescot Street (centre) on John Rocque's Map of London, 1746

Of the original 18th Century housing only one has survived, at number 23. The London Infirmary was on the south side of Prescot Street, and the north side of Chamber Street, until it moved to Whitechapel Road in 1757 and became the London Hospital. The Magdalen House for Reception of Penitent Prostitutes which opened in 1758, took over the building. An old alleyway, Magdalen Passage, survives to commemorate the name, just west of number 16.

In the Regency era (by 1800) the street was known as Great Prescott Street and there was an adjoining Little Prescott Street.

The Roman Catholic English Martyrs Church, designed by Edward Welby Pugin and built between 1873 and 1876, is at number 30. At number 15 is a Victorian pub, The Princess of Prussia, built around 1880. It is adjoined to another Victorian building, number 16, once the Whitechapel County Court, built in Italianate style in red brick on the site of the old hospital.

At number 1 Prescot Street (on the corner of Leman Street) is the Grade II listed former Cooperative Wholesale Society building, once known as The Tea House (1930–33). Designed by L G Ekins, the building is "..an unusual example in Britain of the German Expressionist style."

During World War II, the area was severely damaged during The Blitz (a bomb site can still be seen in Magdalen Passage). All of the buildings on the north side are modern. On the south side (at number 21) is the Royal College of Psychiatrists, which moved from its previous location in Belgrave Square to the new building in October 2013.
