= Alie Street =

Street in Whitechapel, London

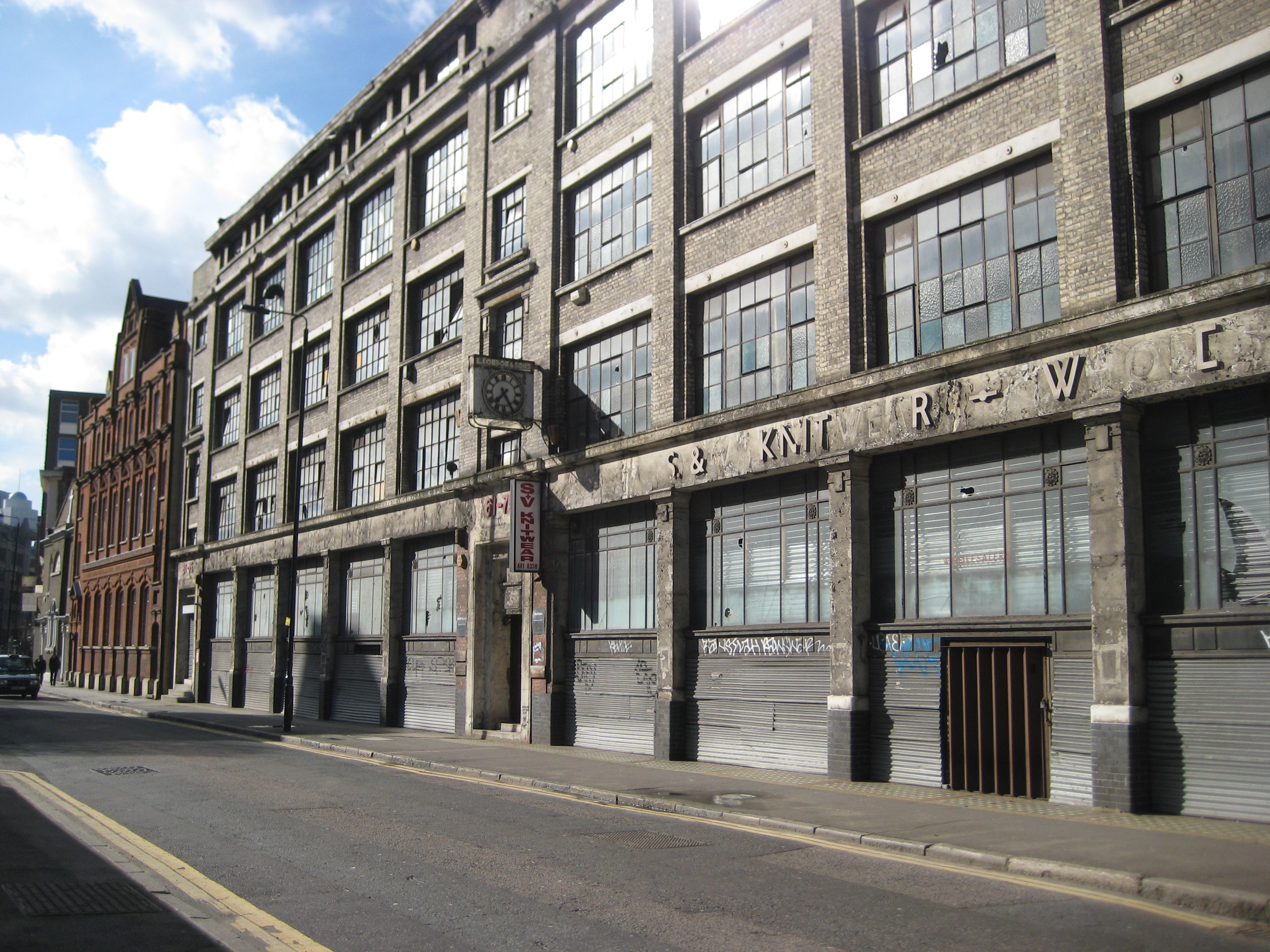
- Disused factory, Alie Street, 2010

- Location within Central London
- Former names: Ayliff Street, Great Alie Street and Little Alie Street
- Location: Tower Hamlets, London
- Postal code: E1
- Nearest Tube station: Aldgate; Aldgate East
- Coordinates: 51°30′48.96″N 0°4′17.66″W
- West end: Mansell Street
- East end: Commercial Road

Construction
- Construction start: 17th Century
- Completed: 17th Century

Alie Street is a 400-metre-long street located in Whitechapel, in the London Borough of Tower Hamlets. It links Mansell Street with Commercial Road in the East End of London. For much of its history, the western part was known as Great Alie Street, with the eastern part called Little Alie Street.

== History ==
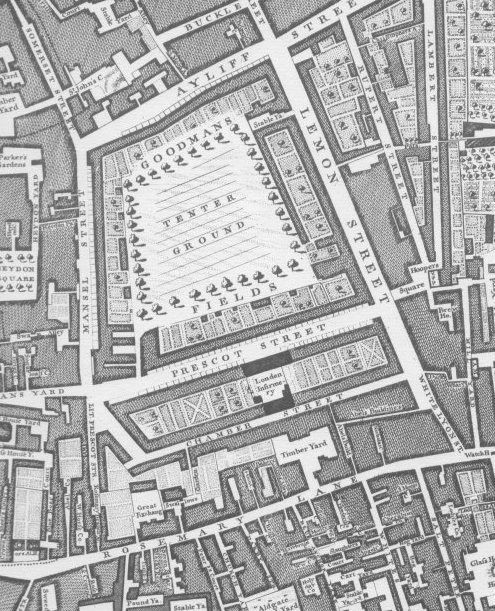
Detail from John Rocque's Map of London, 1746

Originally called Ayliff Street, it was named after a relative of William Leman, whose great-uncle, John Leman had bought Goodman's Fields earlier in the seventeenth century. Alie Street ran along the northern side, with Leman Street to the east, Prescot Street to the south, and Mansell Street to the West. These new streets developed in the late seventeenth century while Goodman's Fields was used as a tenterground.

From the 1800s to the late 20th century, the western section from Mansell Street to Leman Street was known as Great Alie Street, with an extension going east from Leman Street to Commercial Road being known as Little Alie Street.

Symons House, 22 Alie Street, is the former headquarters (from 1923) of the radical Jewish Workers’ Circle Friendly Society, linked to its New York counterpart The Workers Circle, and known accordingly as Circle House.

It was home in the 1980's and 90's to a high specification data-centre (construction January 1976 to May 1977) for Natwest (later Royal Bank of Scotland) that included restaurants a shop and accommodation for its shift workers, the site has now been re-developed as a neighbourhood development one the reasons the site was chosen as it is just outside the City of London so had good connectivity their building located there (but without the higher taxes and costs of it), the site was never used fully as a data-centre however as its visible location could make it a target. Given its high importance (in its original design) it was also a (constantly running) oil-burning power station that allowed it too seamlessly continue to run even if power-lines were cut to it.

Given the areas history as near to the docks of the port of London, is home to London's oldest Indian restaurant called "Halal Restaurant" which started in 1939 as a hostel for Indian merchant seamen and is on the corner with St Mark’s Place
