= Mansell Street =

Street in London

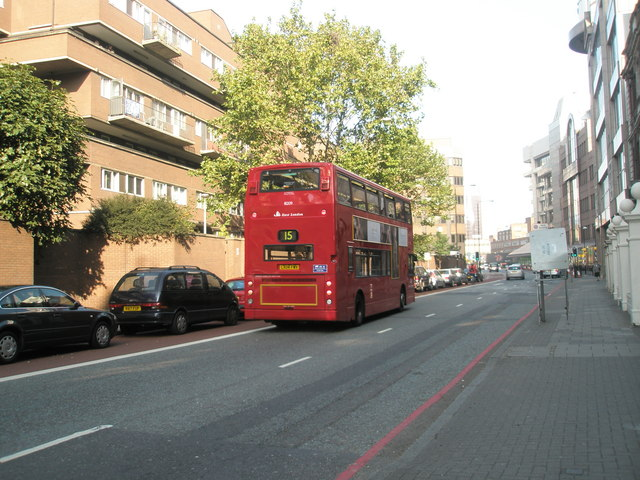
- Bus heading northwards up Mansell Street
- Location: City of London, Tower Hamlets, London
- Postal code: E1
- Nearest Tube station: Docklands Light Railway
- Coordinates: 51°30′52.1″N 0°4′26.12″W
- North end: Aldgate
- South end: East Smithfield

Construction
- Construction start: 17th Century
- Completion: 17th Century

Mansell Street is a street in Central London, which is part of the London Inner Ring Road. For most of its length from the north, this street marks the boundary between the City of London and the London Borough of Tower Hamlets. However, the southernmost part is entirely in Tower Hamlets.

== History ==
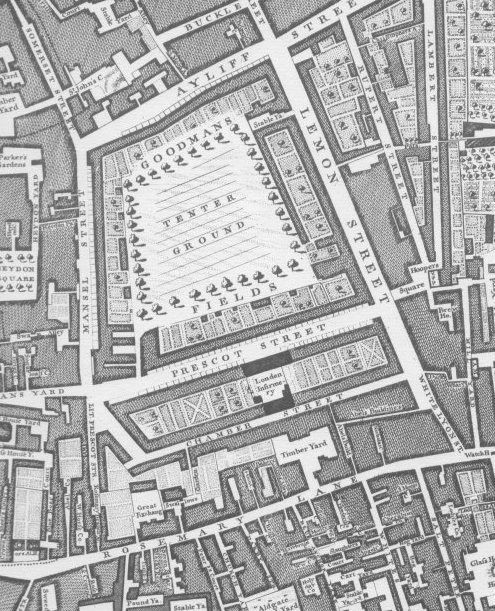
Detail from John Rocque's Map of London, 1746

Mansell Street was named after a relative of William Leman, whose great-uncle, John Leman had bought Goodman's Fields earlier in the seventeenth century. Alie Street ran along the western side, with Leman Street to the east, Prescot Street to the south, and Alie Street to the North. These new streets were developed in the late seventeenth century while Goodman's Fields was used as a tenterground.

== Mansell Street estate ==
This estate was built in 1977 by the Guinness Trust. It consists of 194 homes and in 2019 there were plans for its redevelopment.

== See also ==
- R v Incedal
