= Sir William Leman, 2nd Baronet =

English politician

Sir William Leman, 2nd Baronet (19 December 1637 – 18 July 1701) was an English politician who sat in the House of Commons from 1690 to 1695.

Leman was the son of Sir William Leman, 1st Baronet and his wife Rebecca Prescot, daughter of Edward Prescot, of Thoby, in Essex, and of London. He inherited the baronetcy on the death of his father in 1667.

He was appointed High Sheriff of Hertfordshire for 1676–77. In 1690, Leman was elected Member of Parliament for Hertford and held the seat until 1695.

He developed Goodman's Fields, near Aldgate and now in East London. He used family names to identify the streets: alongside Leman Street he named Mansell Street after his wife's family, Prescot Street after that of his mother, and Ayliff/Alie Street after his daughter-in-law's family, Aley.

Leman died at his house at Northaw at the age of 63 and was succeeded by his grandson William. He had married Mary Mansell, daughter of Sir Lewis Mansell, 2nd Baronet of Margam in 1655.

Parliament of England
Preceded by Sir Thomas Byde; Sir William Cowper, Bt	Member of Parliament for Hertford; 1690–1695; With: Sir William Cowper, Bt	Succeeded by Sir William Cowper, Bt; William Cowper
Baronetage of England
Preceded by William Leman	Baronet (of Northaw); 1667–1701	Succeeded by William Leman
