= Sir William Leman, 1st Baronet =

English politician

Sir William Leman, 1st Baronet (died 1667) was an English politician who sat in the House of Commons at various times between 1645 and 1660.

Leman was the son of William Leman of Beccles and his wife Alice. He was a woollen draper and a member of the Worshipful Company of Fishmongers. He was heir to his uncle, Sir John Leman, Lord Mayor of London in 1617, and purchased the manor of Northaw in Hertfordshire, from William Sidley. He was High Sheriff of Hertfordshire in 1636 and High Sheriff of Huntingdonshire in 1641.

Leman was an alderman of the City of London and was involved with Cornelius Fish, the Chamberlain of London, in running a charity in Bassishaw Ward established in 1638.

In 1645, Leman was elected Member of Parliament for Hertford in the Long Parliament. He became an alderman of Bread Street ward in 1649. In 1651 he was a Councillor of State. He was chosen as alderman for Billingsgate ward on 12 July 1653. He resat as MP for Hertford in 1659 for the Restored Rump Parliament.

Leman was created baronet on 3 March 1665.

Leman married Rebecca Prescot, daughter of Edward Prescot, of Thoby, in Essex, and of London. He had a son, William.

Parliament of England
Preceded by Viscount Cranborne; Sir Thomas Fanshawe	Member of Parliament for Hertford; 1645–1653; With: Viscount Cranborne	Succeeded by Not represented in Barebones Parliament
Baronetage of England
New creation	Baronet (of Northaw); 1665–1667	Succeeded by William Leman
