= Leman baronets =

Extinct baronetcy in the Baronetage of England

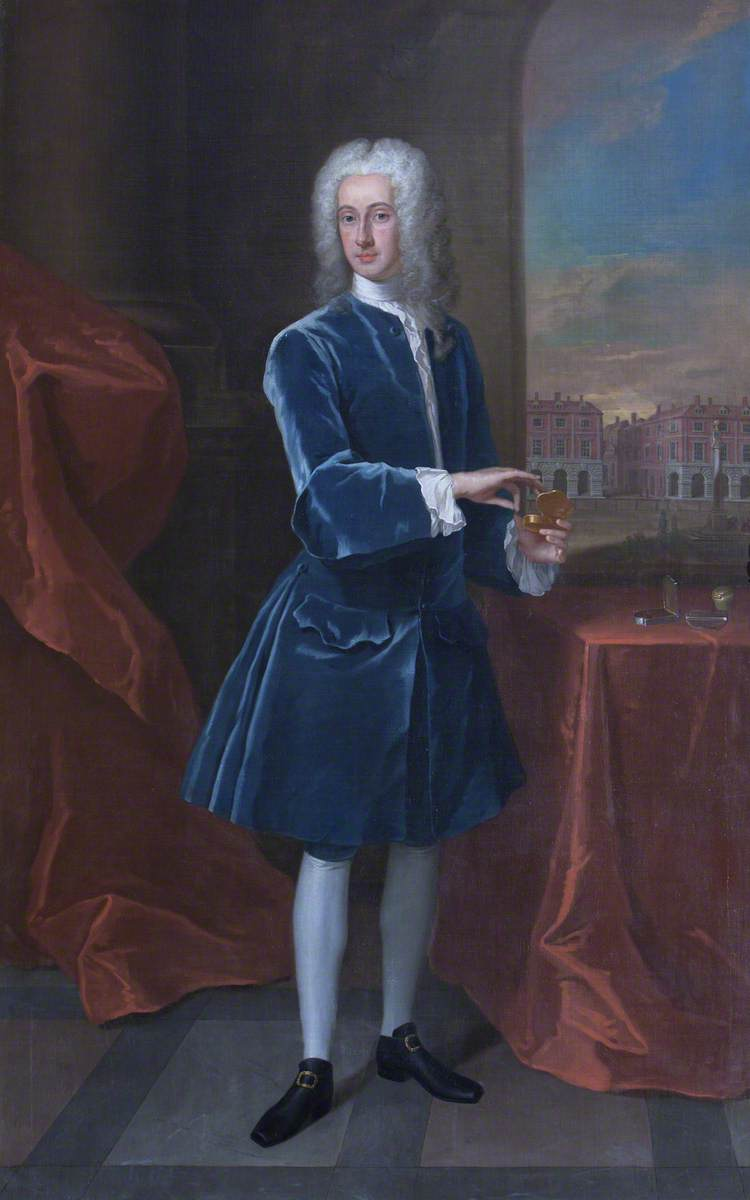
Sir William Leman, 3rd Baronet

The Leman Baronetcy, of Northaw in the County of Hertford, was a title in the Baronetage of England. It was created on 3 March 1665 for William Leman, Member of Parliament for Hertford. The second Baronet also represented this constituency in the House of Commons. The title is believed to have become extinct on the death of the fourth Baronet in 1762, although it was claimed by supposed descendants of the first Baronet in the 19th century.

== Leman baronets, of Northaw (1665) ==
- Sir William Leman, 1st Baronet (died 1667)
- Sir William Leman, 2nd Baronet (1637–1701)
- Sir William Leman, 3rd Baronet (1685–1741)
- Sir Tanfield Leman, 4th Baronet (1714–1762)
