= John Rocque's maps of London =

18th-century maps of London

John Rocque's 24-sheet map

In 1746, the French-born British surveyor and cartographer John Rocque produced two maps of London and the surrounding area. The better known of these has the full name A Plan of the Cities of London and Westminster, and Borough of Southwark: it is a map of Georgian London to a scale of 26 inches to a mile (i.e. 1:2437), surveyed by John Rocque, engraved by John Pine, and published in 1746. It consists of 24 sheets and measures 3.84 m × 2.01 m (12 ft 7 in × 6 ft 7 in). Taking nearly ten years to survey, engrave and publish, it has been described as "a magnificent example of cartography ... one of the greatest and most handsome plans of any city".

Also in 1746, Rocque published another, smaller-scale, map of London, Westminster, Southwark, and their environs in sixteen sheets: its full name is An Exact Survey of the city's of London Westminster ye Borough of Southwark and the Country near ten miles round / begun in 1741 & ended in 1745 by John Rocque Land Surveyor; & Engrav'd by Richard Parr. Although it lacks the high definition of its better-known counterpart, it covers a much larger area.

== "London, Westminster and Southwark": meaning ==
The City of London, the vill of Westminster, and the borough of Southwark, were originally distinct legal entities, and were still so in Rocque's day. "London" was the square mile on the north bank of the river Thames; Southwark was a settlement south of London Bridge; and Westminster was a settlement to the west, the seat of Parliament and the law courts. The City of London refused to be responsible for the government of the settlements growing up outside its old walls, who therefore governed themselves. Present-day City of London, Westminster and Southwark are in various senses successors to those districts, which have long since physically merged.

== Plan of the Cities of London and Westminster, and Borough of Southwark ==
=== Background ===
A prospectus for the map was published in 1740, stating:

This Plan will be contained in 24 Sheets of the best Imperial Paper, being near 13 Feet in Length, and 6 Feet and an Half in Depth, and will extend from West to East, on the North Side, from beyond Mary-bone Turnpike, by Tottenham-Court, the New-River-Head, Hoxton and Part of Hackney to near Bow: From thence, Southerly, by the Easternmost Parts of Mile-End and Lime-House, cross the River Thames to Deptford Road; from whence the Southern Side will extend Westerly, by Newington and Vaux-Hall, to that Part of Surrey which is opposite to Chelsea-College; which Building, together with some Part of Knights-Bridge and Hyde-Park, will be included in the Western Limit ...

The map was financed by people subscribing to obtain a copy – one guinea was paid as a deposit and two guineas when the map was received.

Much of the earlier surveying work needed to be repeated and by 1742 the scheme was close to collapse. There were 246 subscribers, one being Frederick, Prince of Wales, who later was to appoint Rocque as the royal cartographer. The Court of Aldermen of the City of London subsidised the undertaking and the map was dedicated to them and to the Lord Mayor.

=== Method of survey ===
After planning and agreeing the project with George Vertue, Rocque started surveying in March 1738 (1737 Old Style). The survey was complete by 1744, even though Rocque was also busy mapping various other English towns.

Rocque combined two surveying techniques: he made a ground-level survey with a compass and a physical metal chain – the unit of length also being the chain. Compass bearings were taken of the lines measured. He also created a triangulation network over the entire area to be covered by taking readings from church towers and similar high places using a theodolite made by Jonathan Sisson (inventor of the telescopic-sighted theodolite) to measure the observed angle between two other prominent locations. The process was repeated from point to point.

The two methods needed to be reconciled and at the start of his work Rocque relied too much on his ground surveys, only to find they were not in agreement with triangulation. This meant the earlier ground surveying needed to be repeated. Triangulation tends to be more accurate on the larger scale and in the City the dual approach was very successful but in rural areas there were too few prominent landmarks for triangulation to be effective.

Rocque recorded street and place names as the survey proceeded and double checked these by comparing their names with those on earlier maps. For the City of London the Court of Aldermen ordered the ward beadles to assist with this aspect and so the map includes ward boundaries whereas in other areas only parish boundaries are shown.

=== Engraving ===
The map shows internal details for some buildings, such as St Paul's Cathedral, and in less densely populated areas gardens are shown. However, the detail on the map is variable over the various parts of London – in the inner city there was not room for minor roadways to be included. Churches, grand buildings and streets receive close attention but industrial buildings are neglected.

Hatching and broken lines are used to distinguish buildings, gardens, fields and woods. Apart from the cartouches, pictorial detail is limited to trees, boats on the River Thames and the gallows at Tyburn.

The map was engraved on copper plates by John Pine. Each sheet is 27 × 19 inches (77 × 57 cm) and the scale is 1 inch to 200 feet (1:2400), about 26 inches to the mile. Although the survey covered the whole area as a unity, the sheets of the map were produced individually and were not separated from a master drawing.

After being drawn, each paper sheet was placed over a waxed copper plate and the lines were traced manually to produce the engraving. The plate was inked and damp paper pressed on to it to pick up the ink. As they dried, the sheets distorted to some extent so they did not line up perfectly with each other.

=== Publication, sale and reception ===
The map was published in October 1746 by John Pine and John Tinney and advertised for sale on 27 June 1747 as a set of twenty-four sheets covering adjacent areas of London – three rows of eight sheets each. It was titled A Plan of the Cities of London and Westminster and Borough of Southwark; with the Contiguous Buildings; From an actual Survey taken by John Rocque Land-Surveyor, and Engraved by John Pine, Bluemantle Pursuivant at Arms and Chief Engraver of Seals, &c. to His Majesty. An alphabetical list of over 5,500 locations was published in 1748. Rocque had a shop in "Hide Park Road" (a section of Piccadilly), and the public had been able to see the drafts and suggest corrections prior to publication. In his catalogues the map was generally described as "His large Survey of London in 24 Sheets".

In the Annals of London (2000) the map is described as a "massive achievement"; and according to Chetham's Library it is "a magnificent example of cartography and an indispensable reference tool for historians: one of the greatest and most handsome plans of any city". The Oxford Dictionary of National Biography states it was "the outstanding plan of the capital in the eighteenth century".

=== Sheets ===
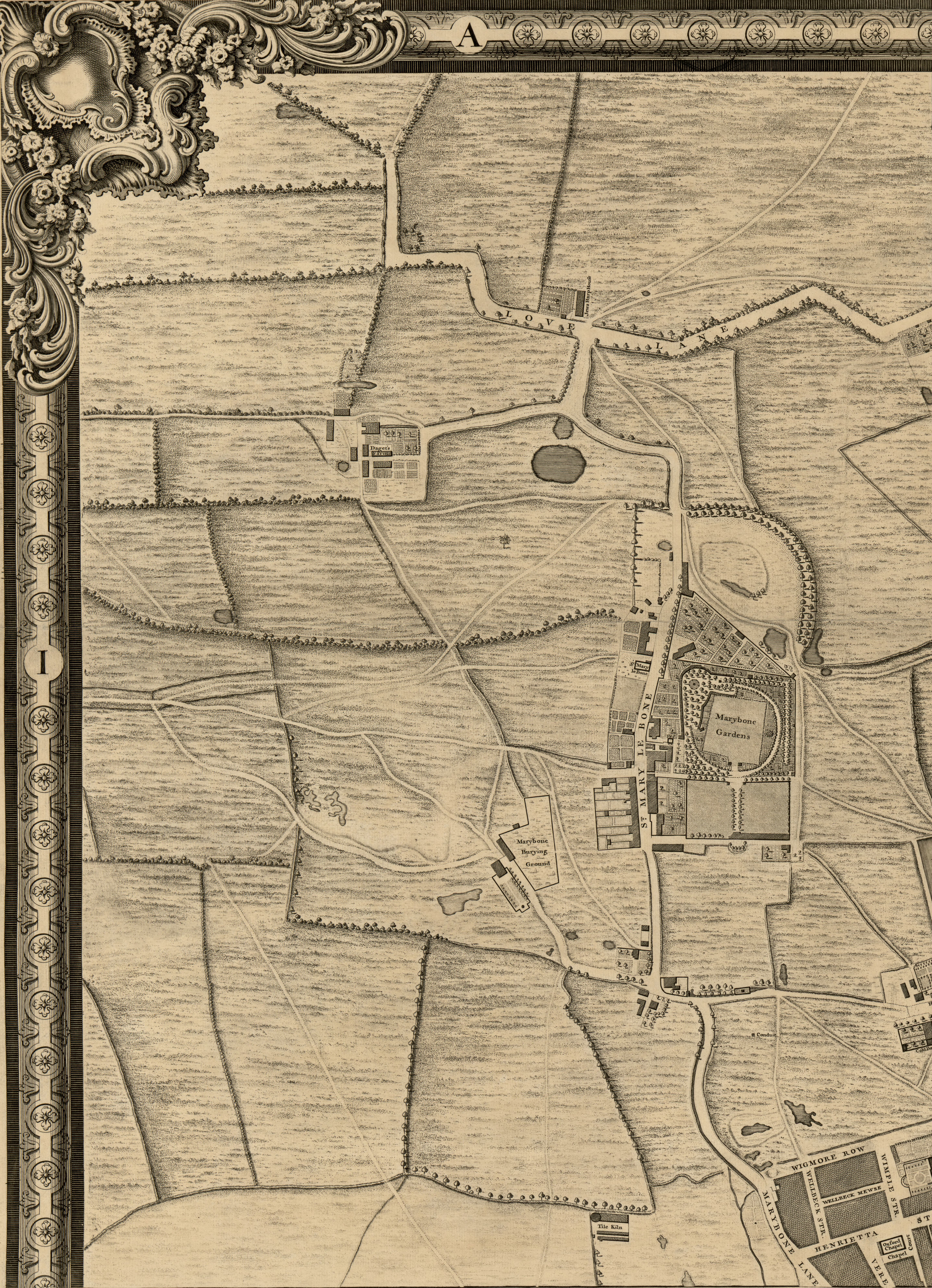
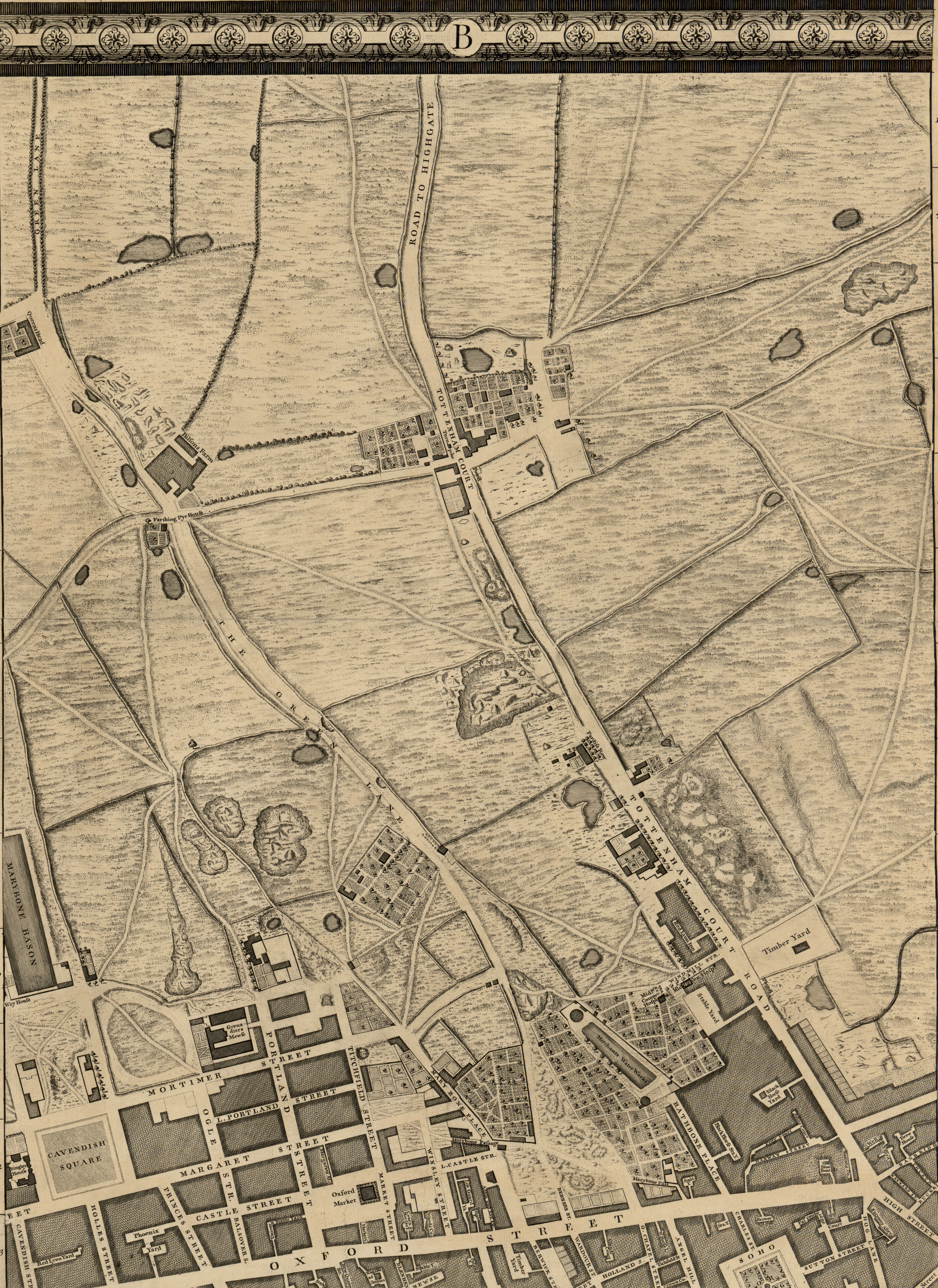
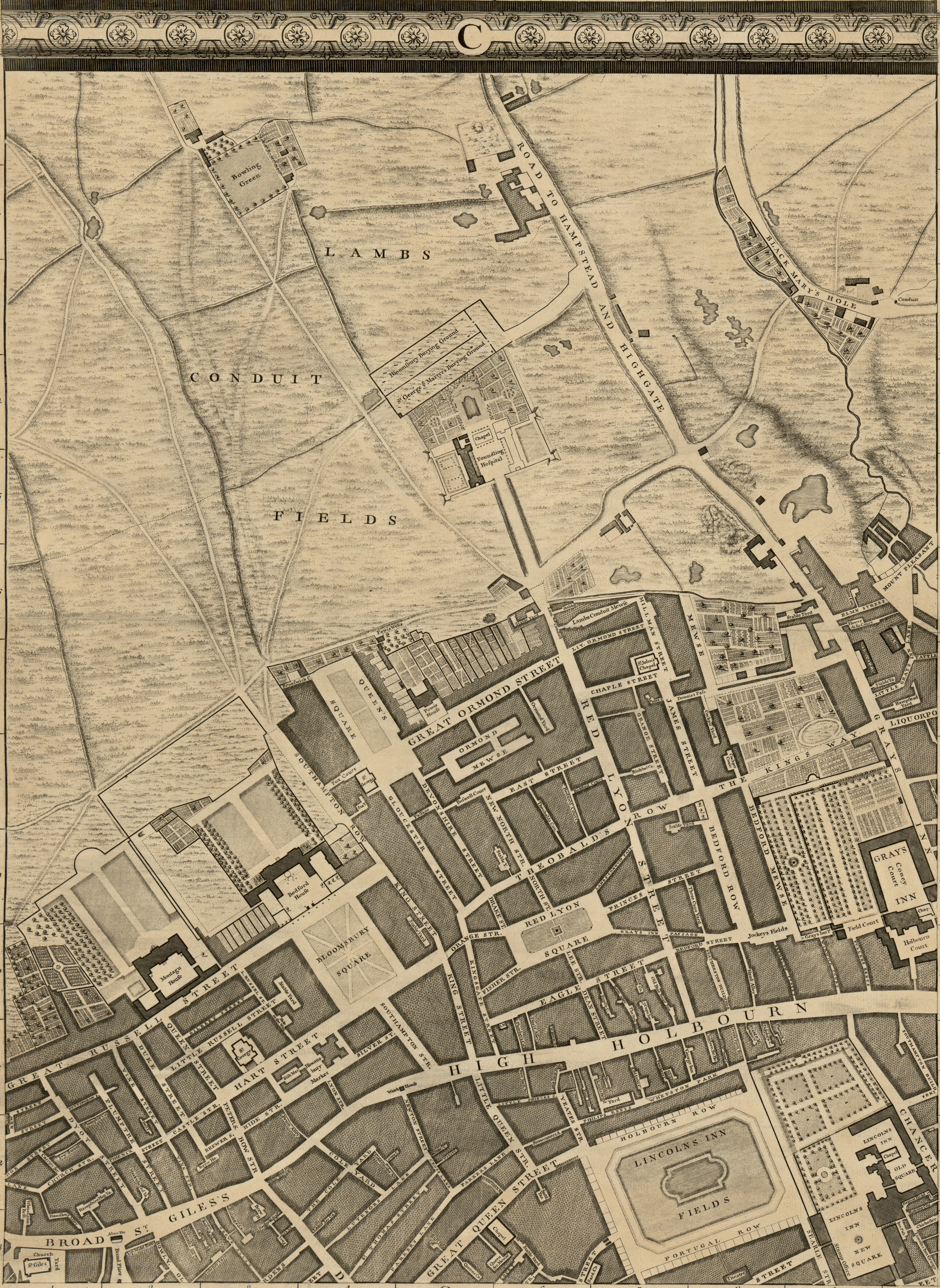
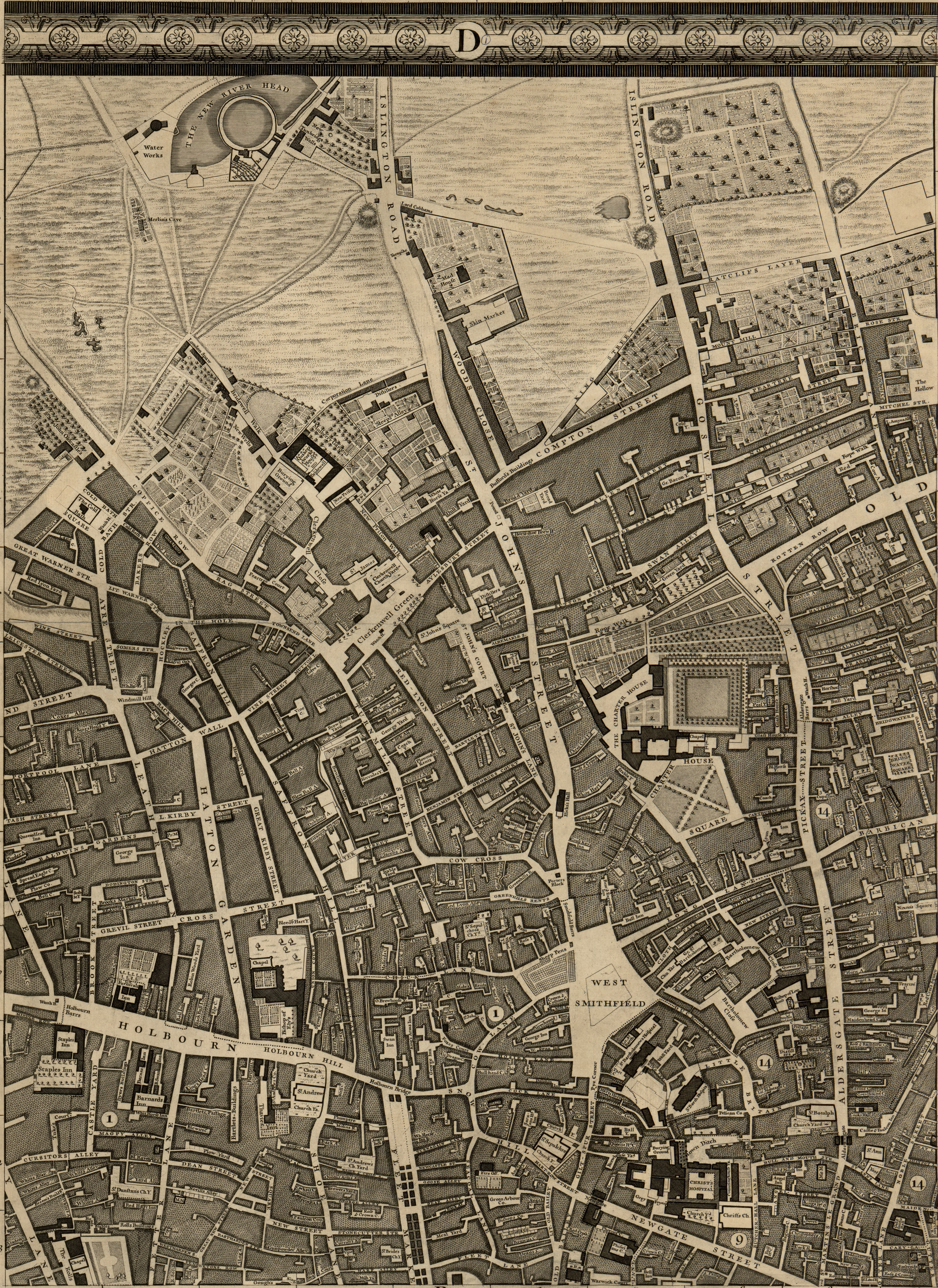
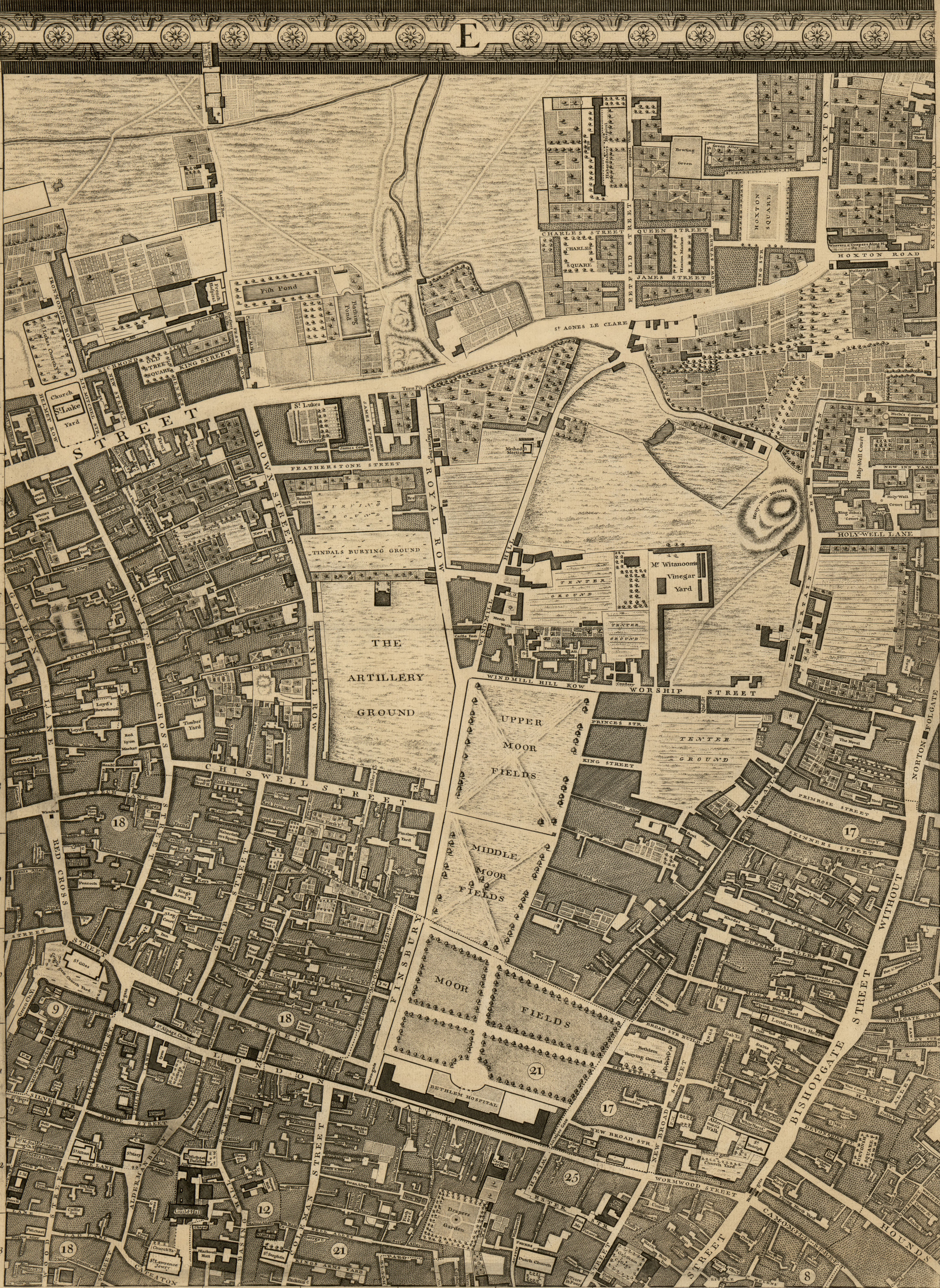
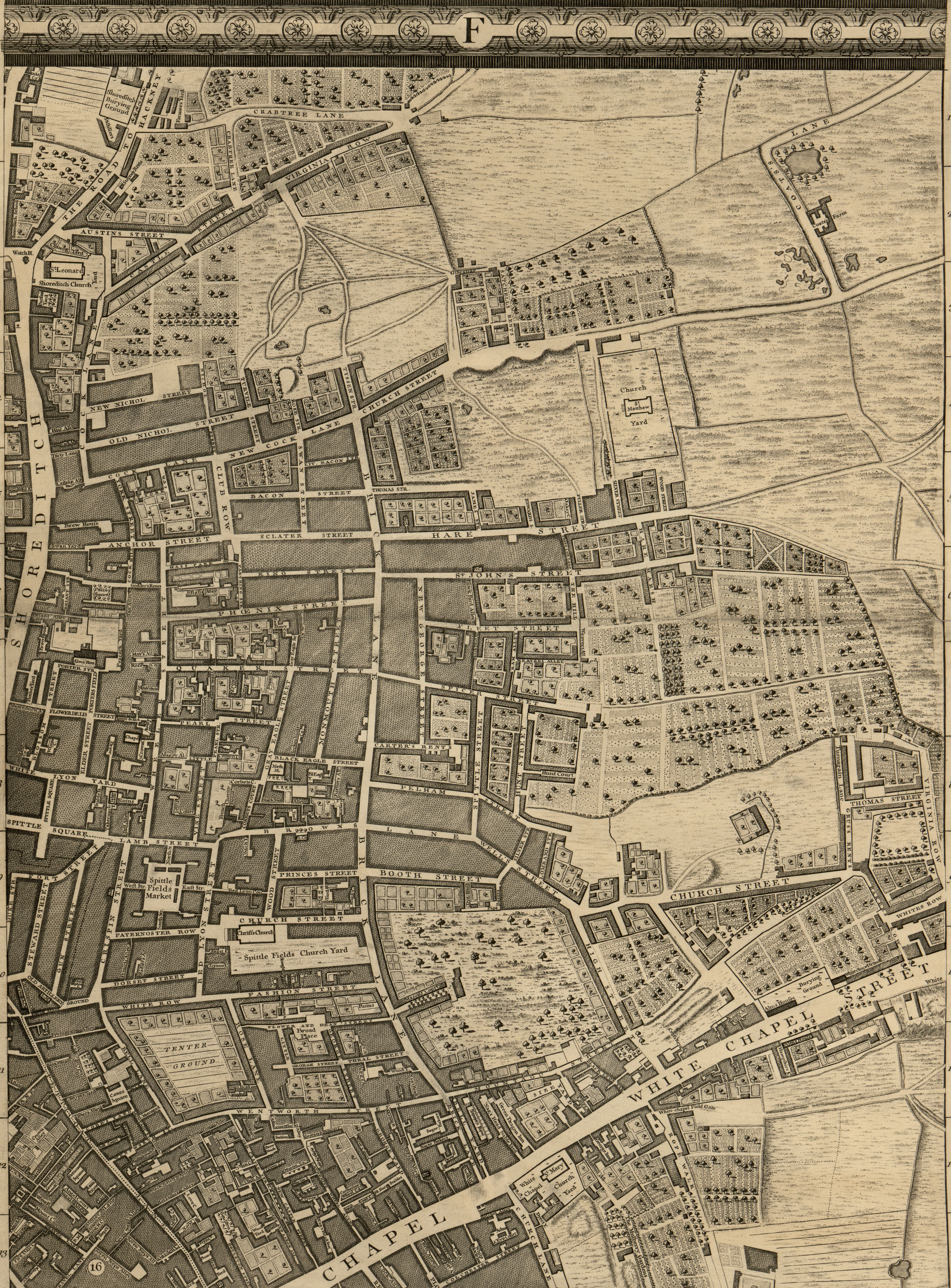
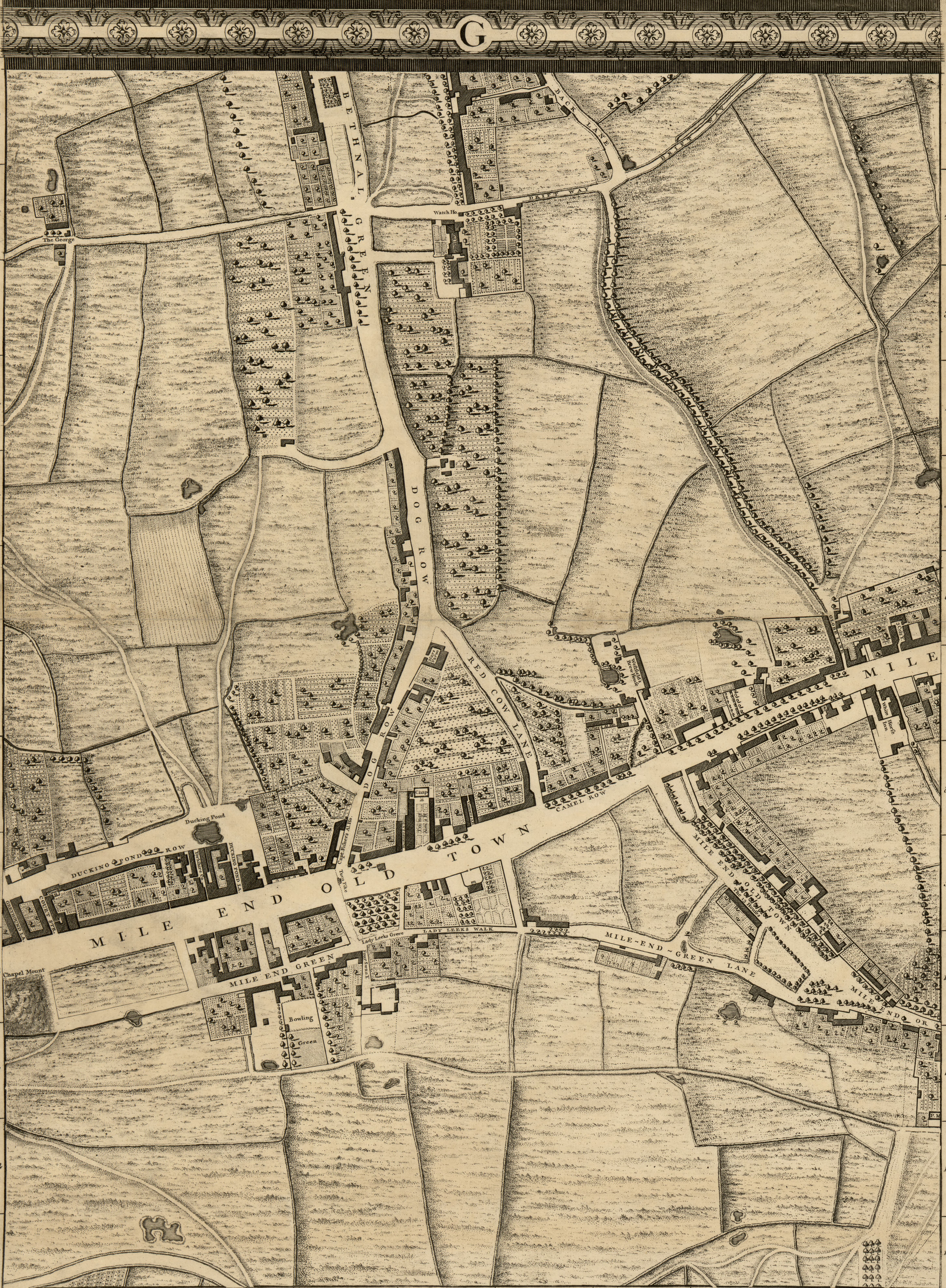
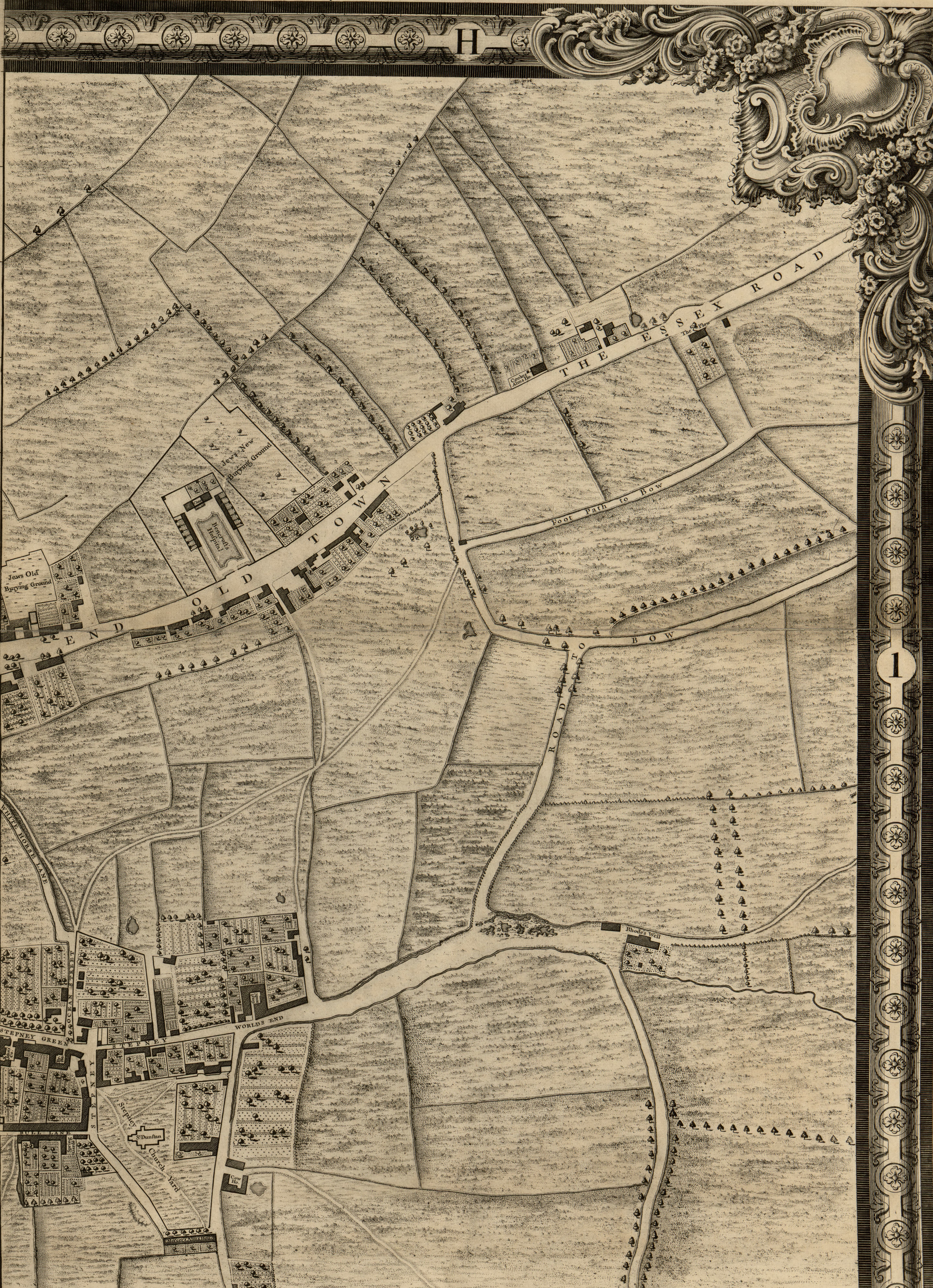
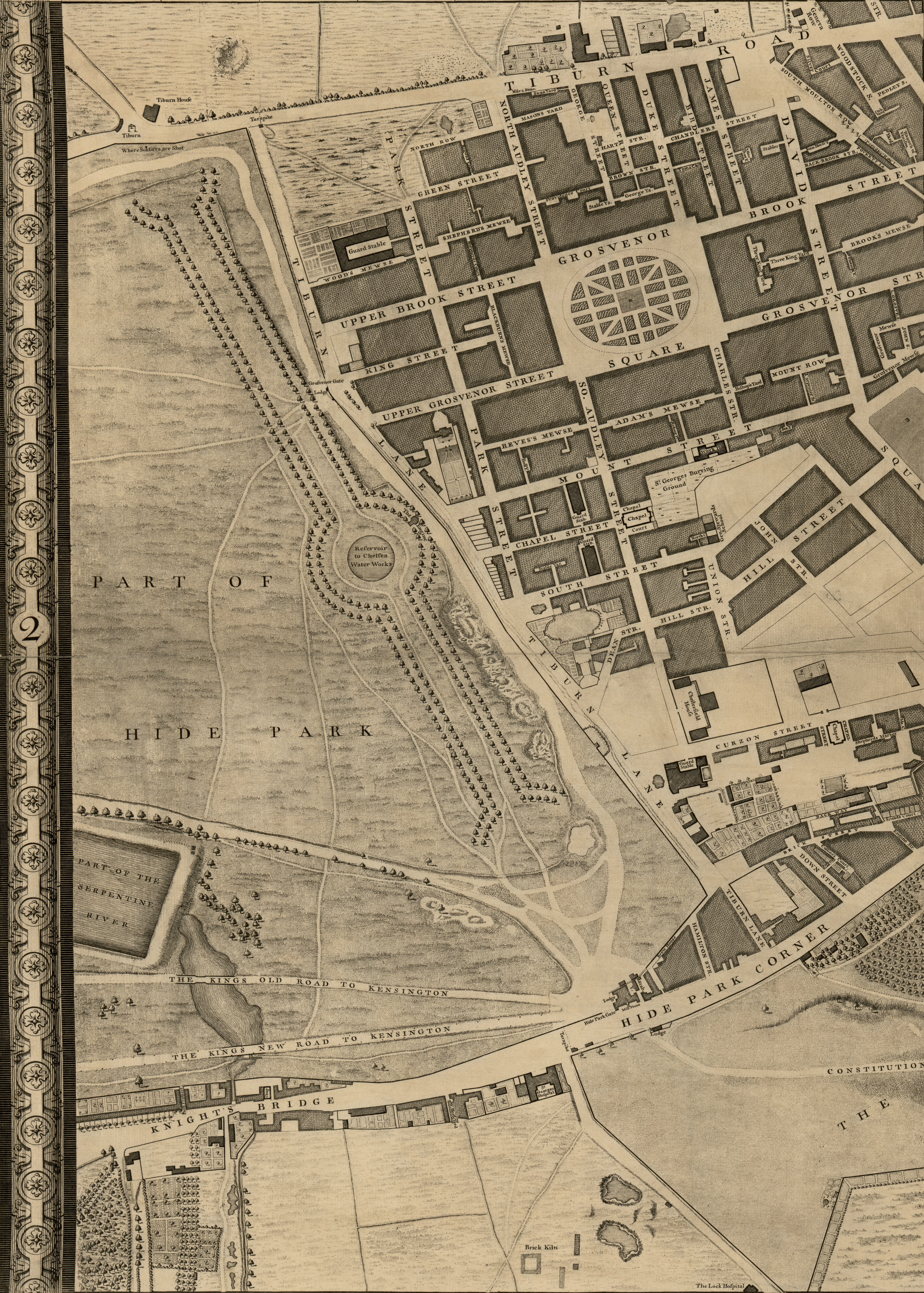
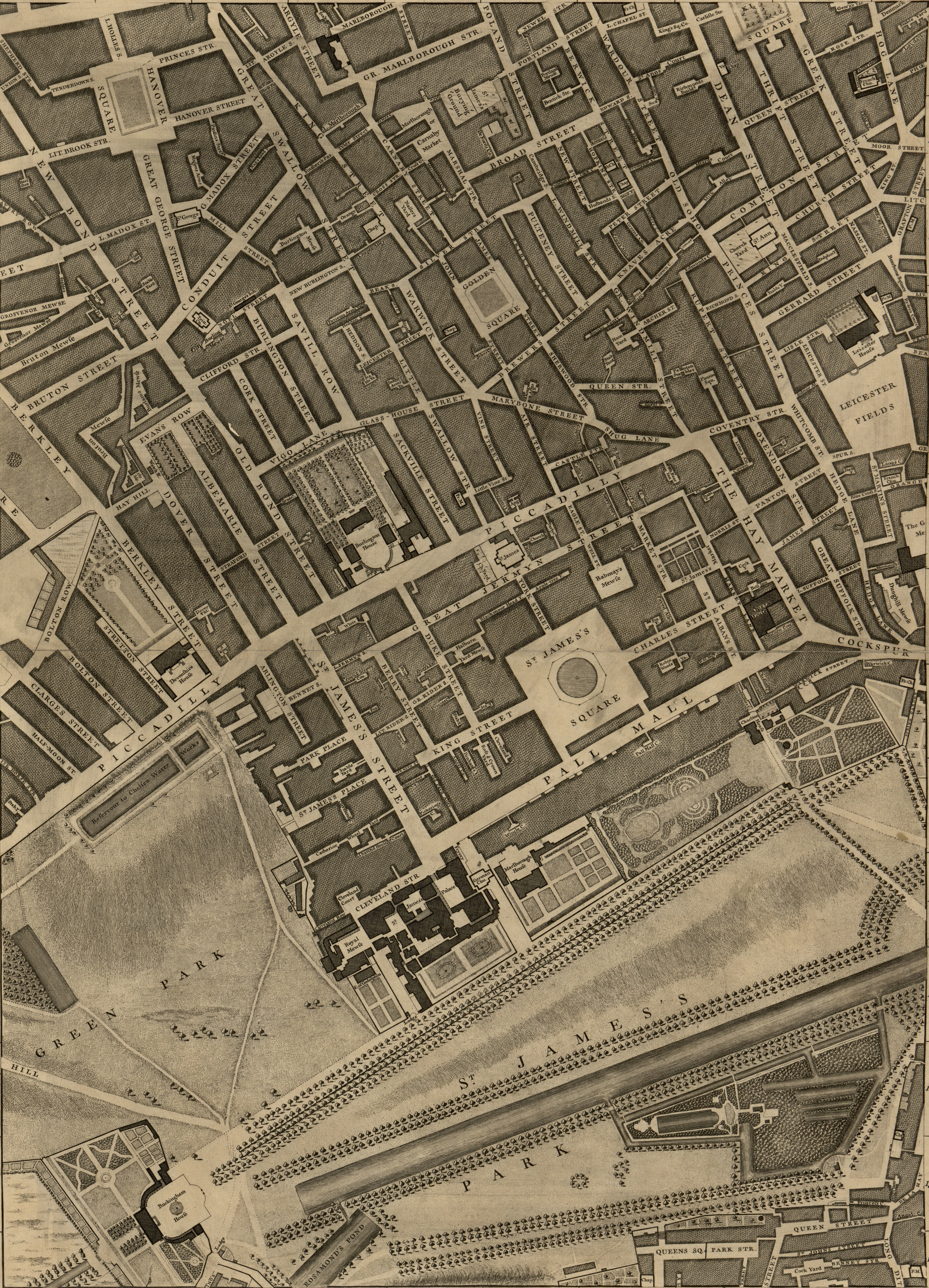
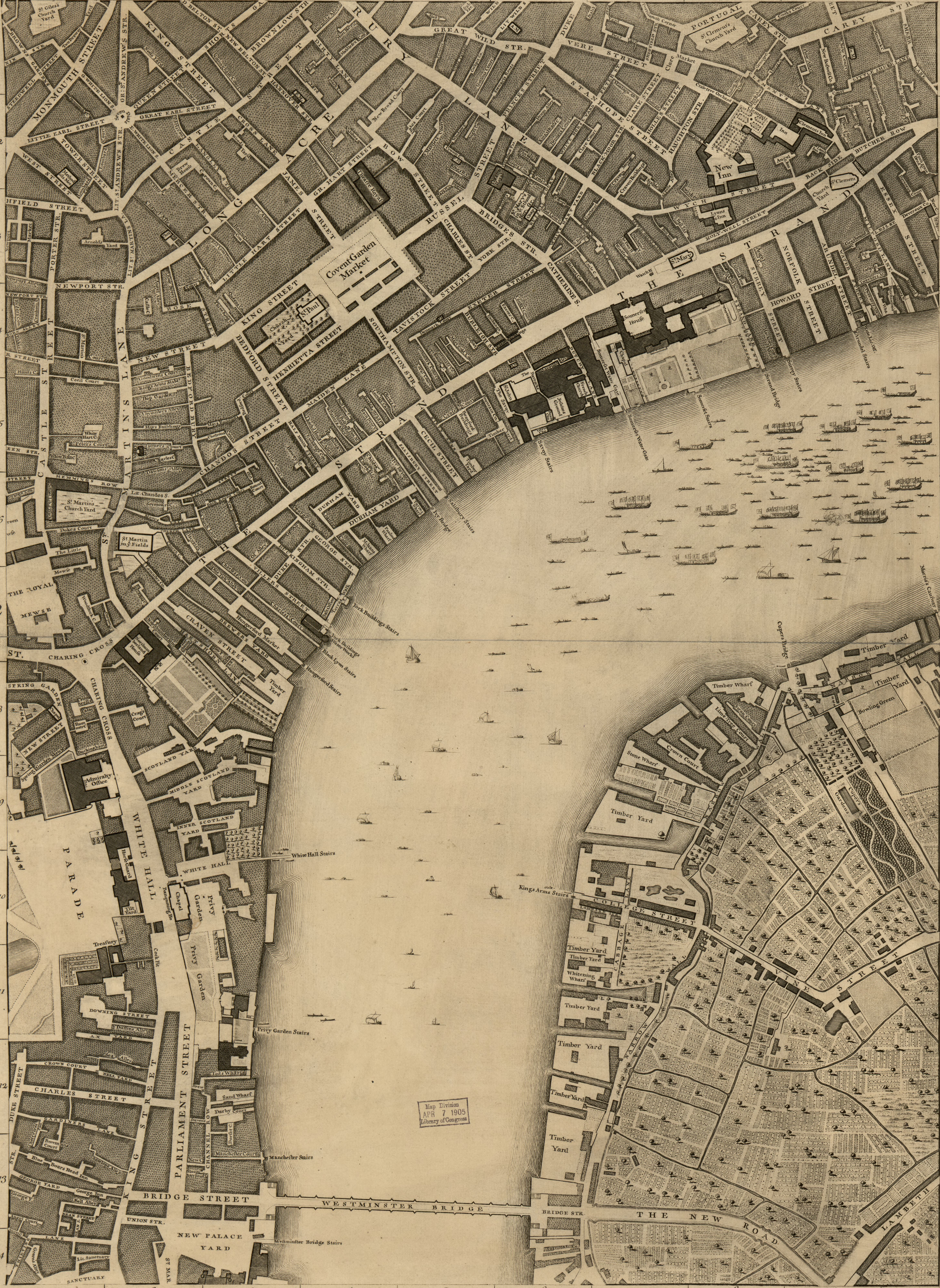
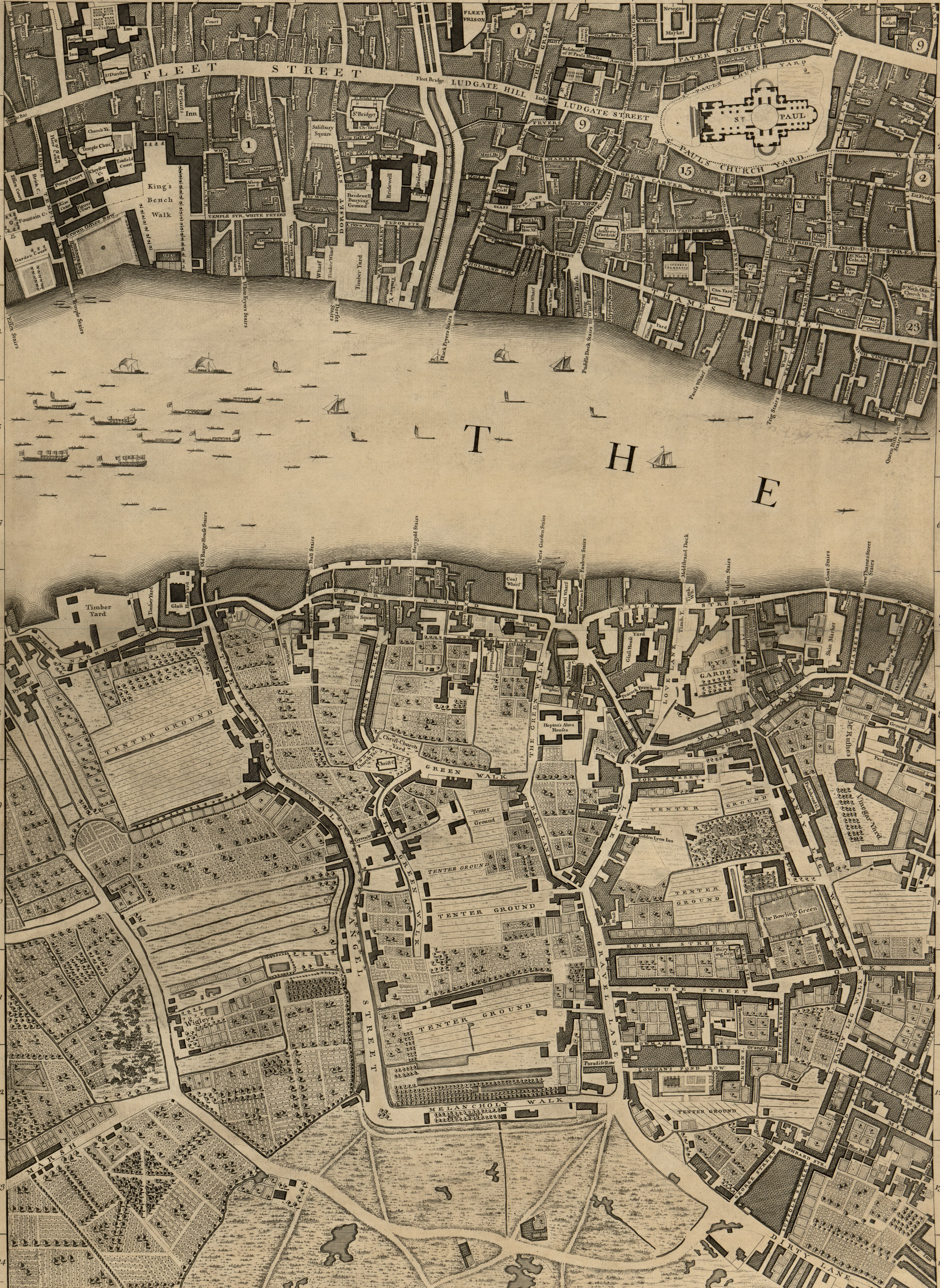
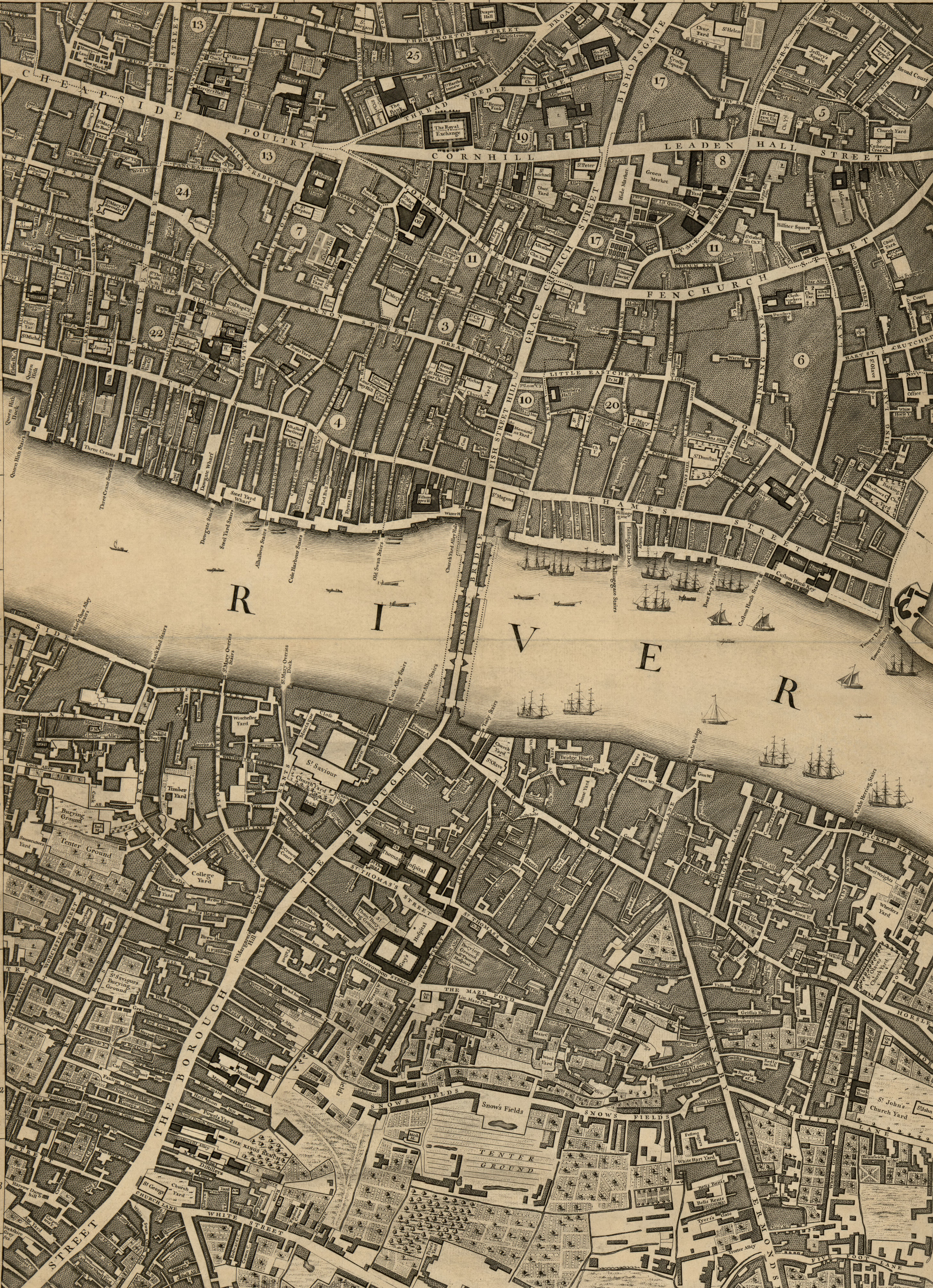
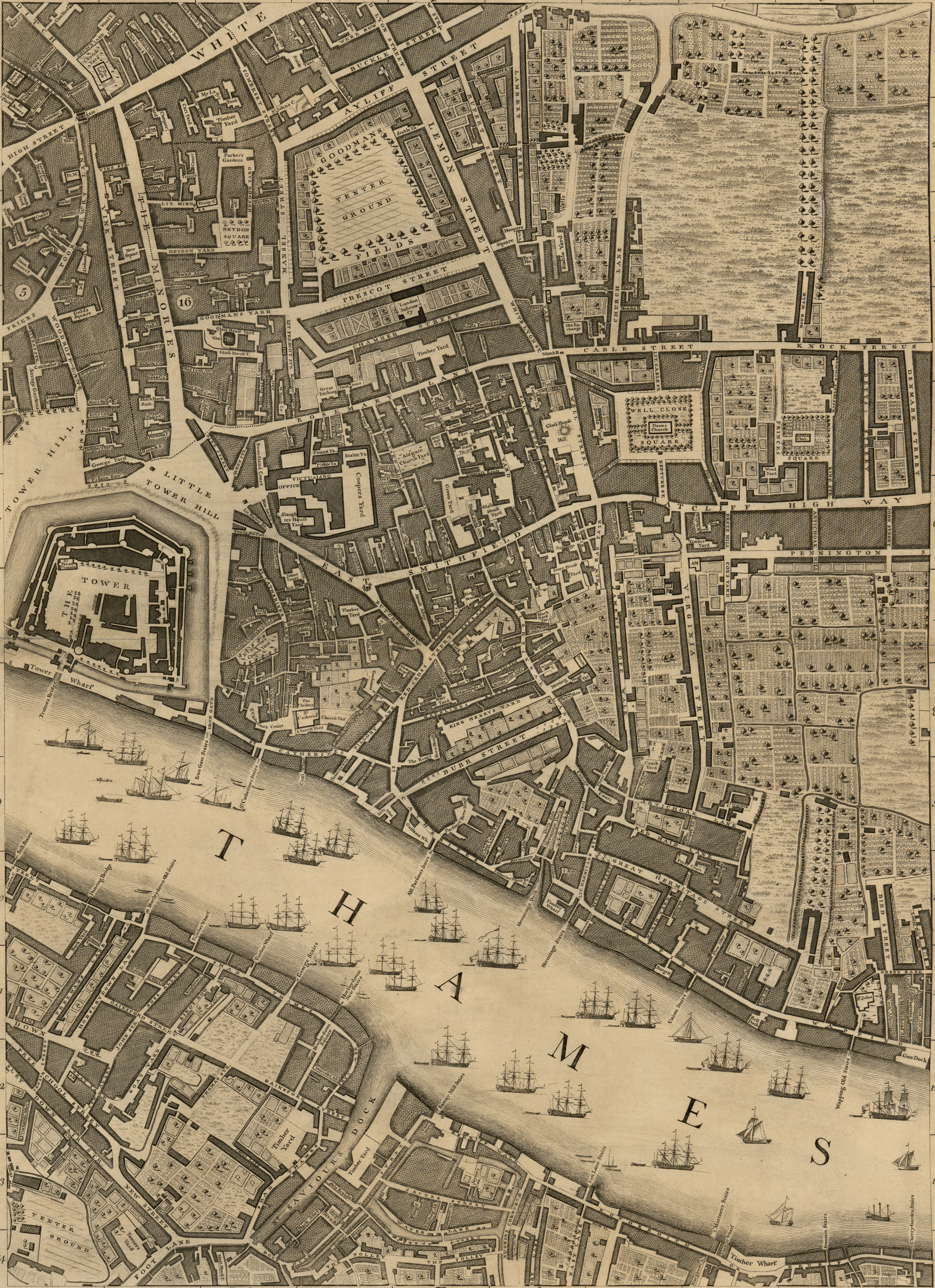
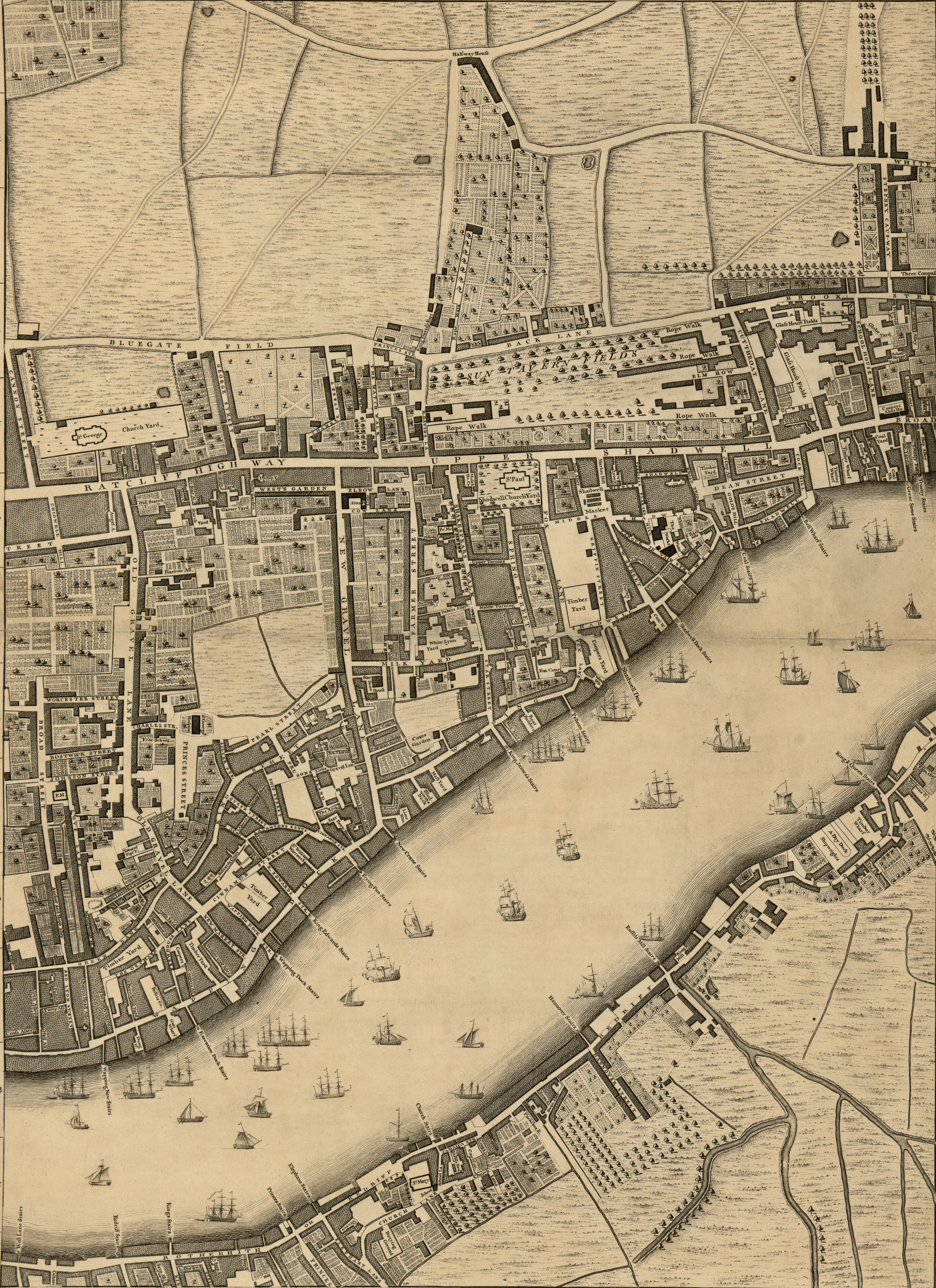
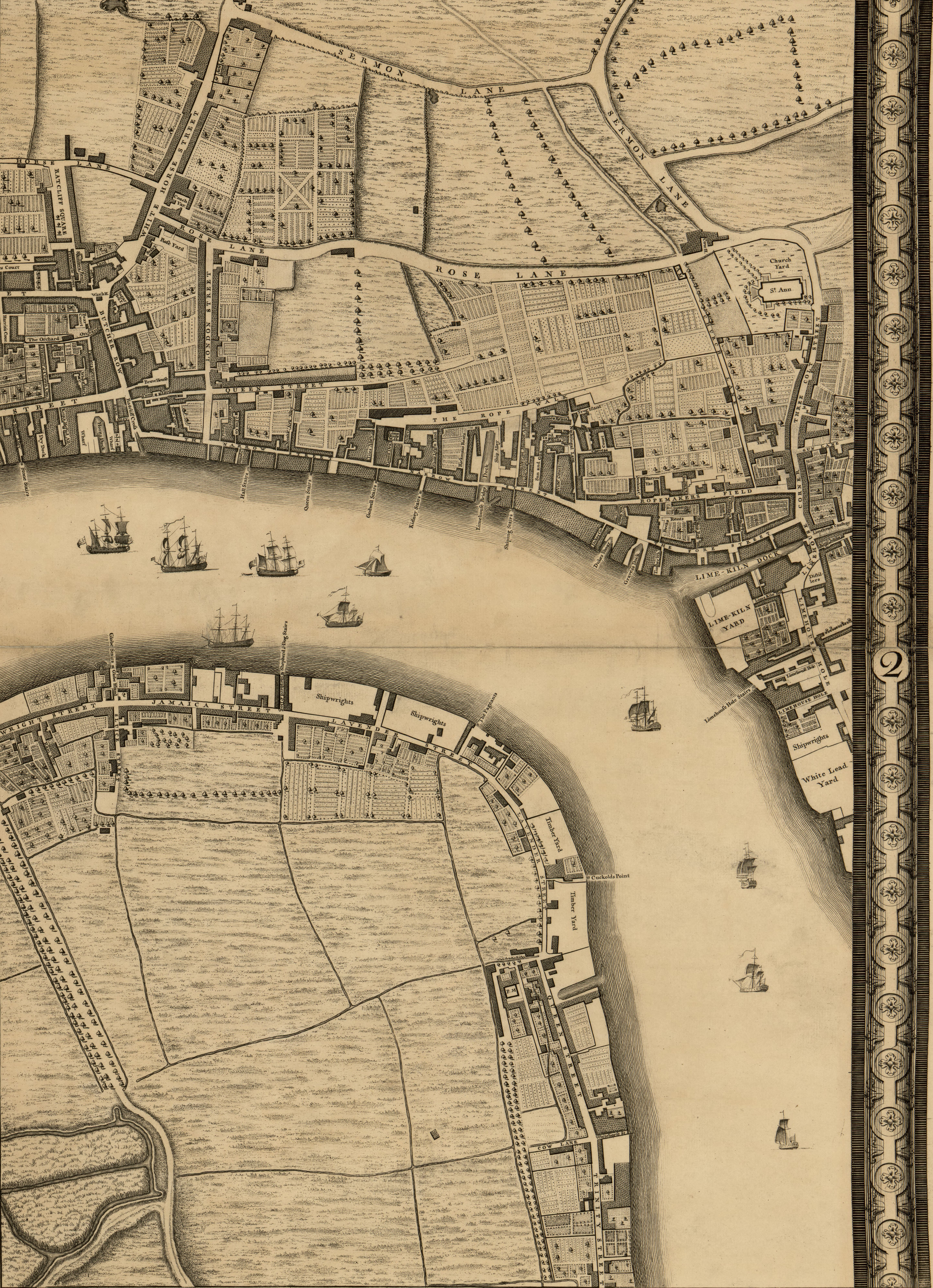
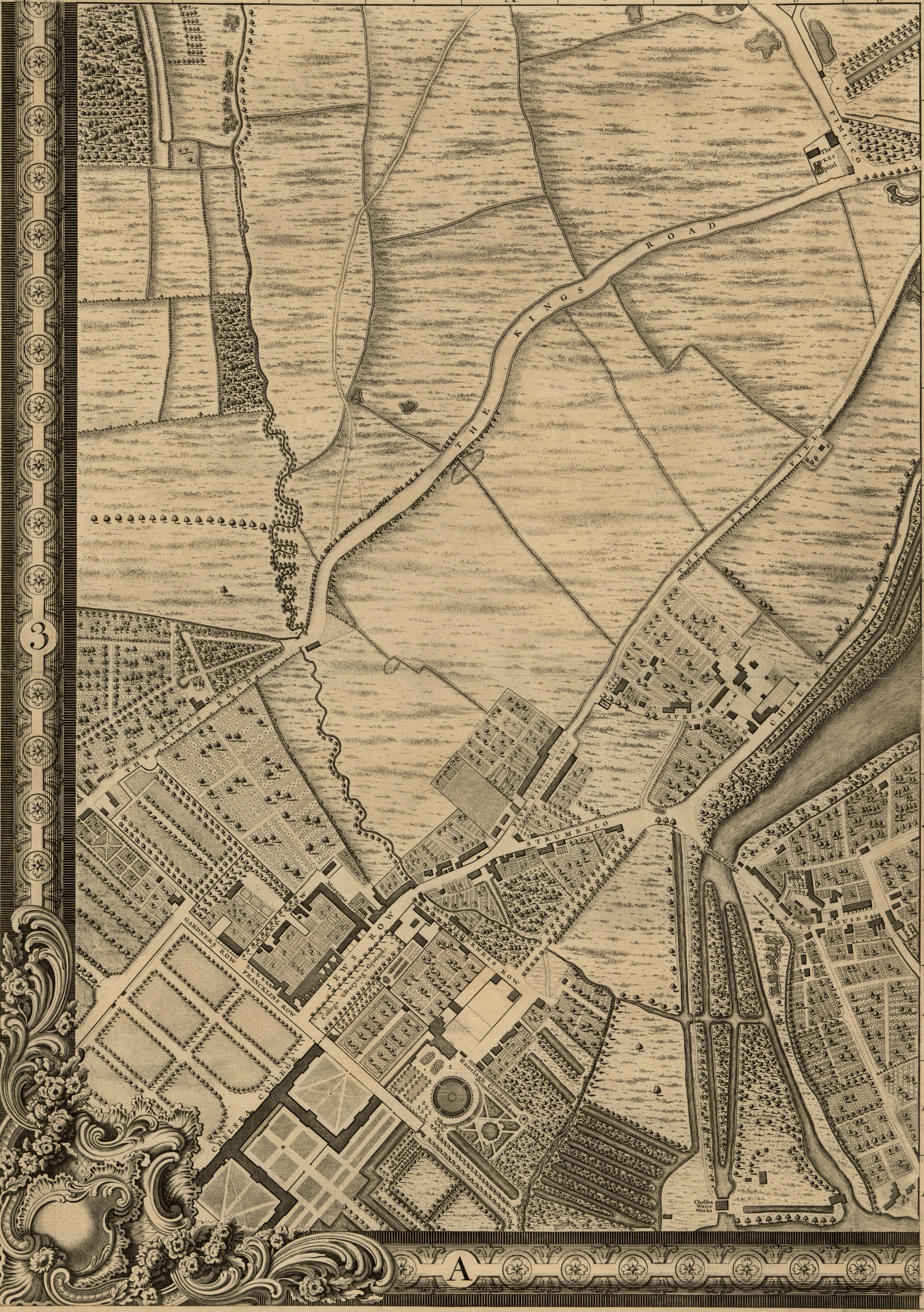
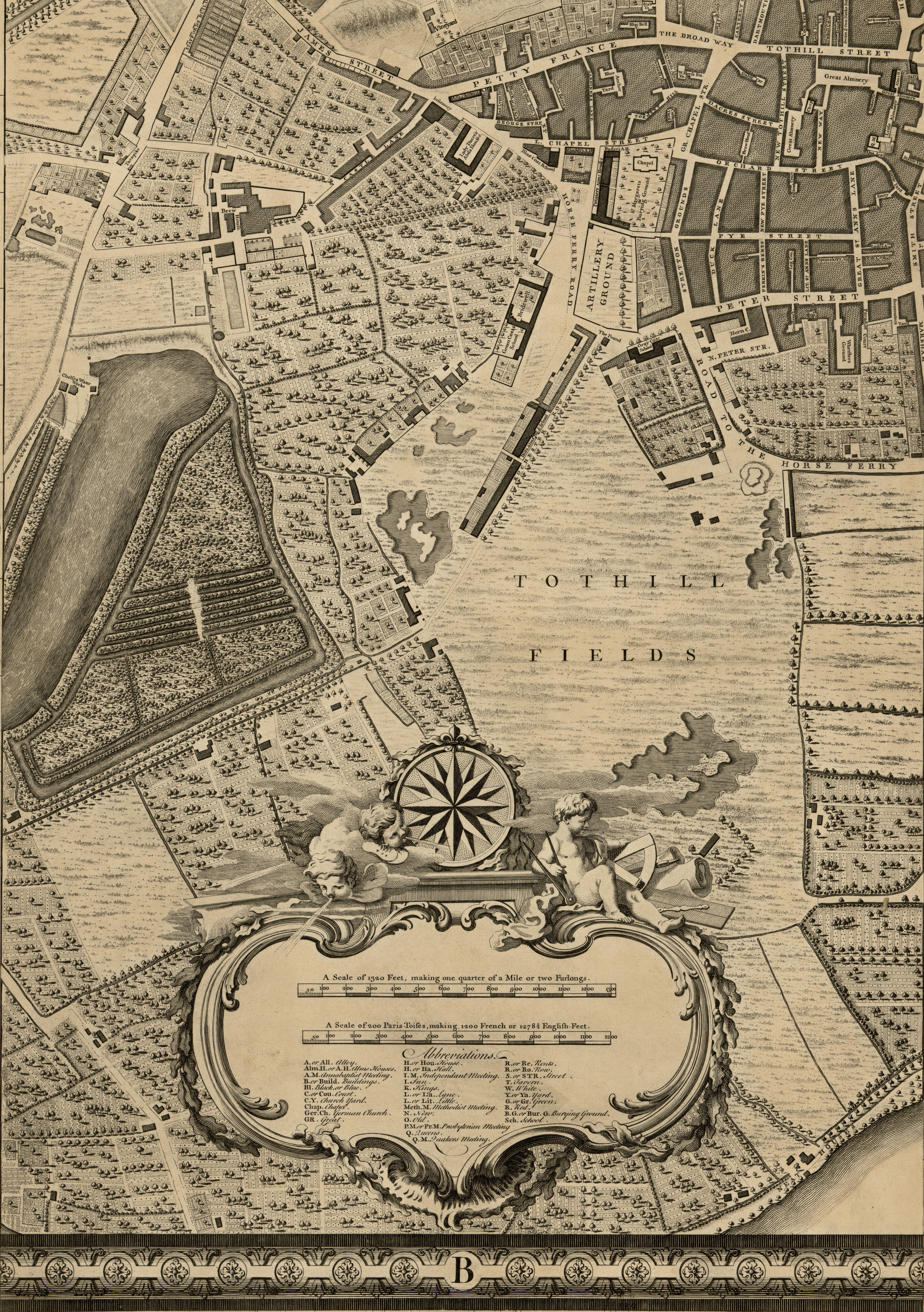
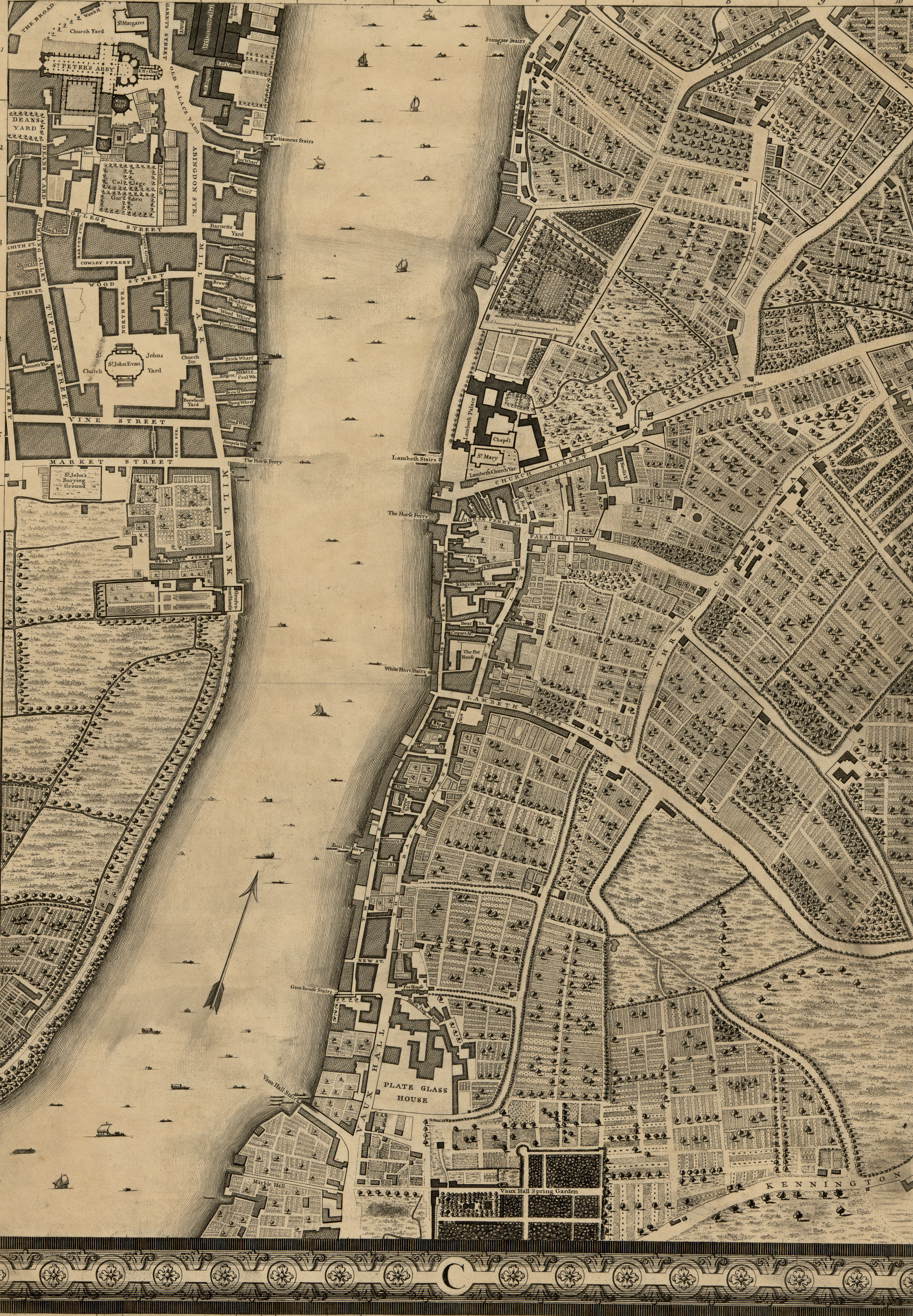
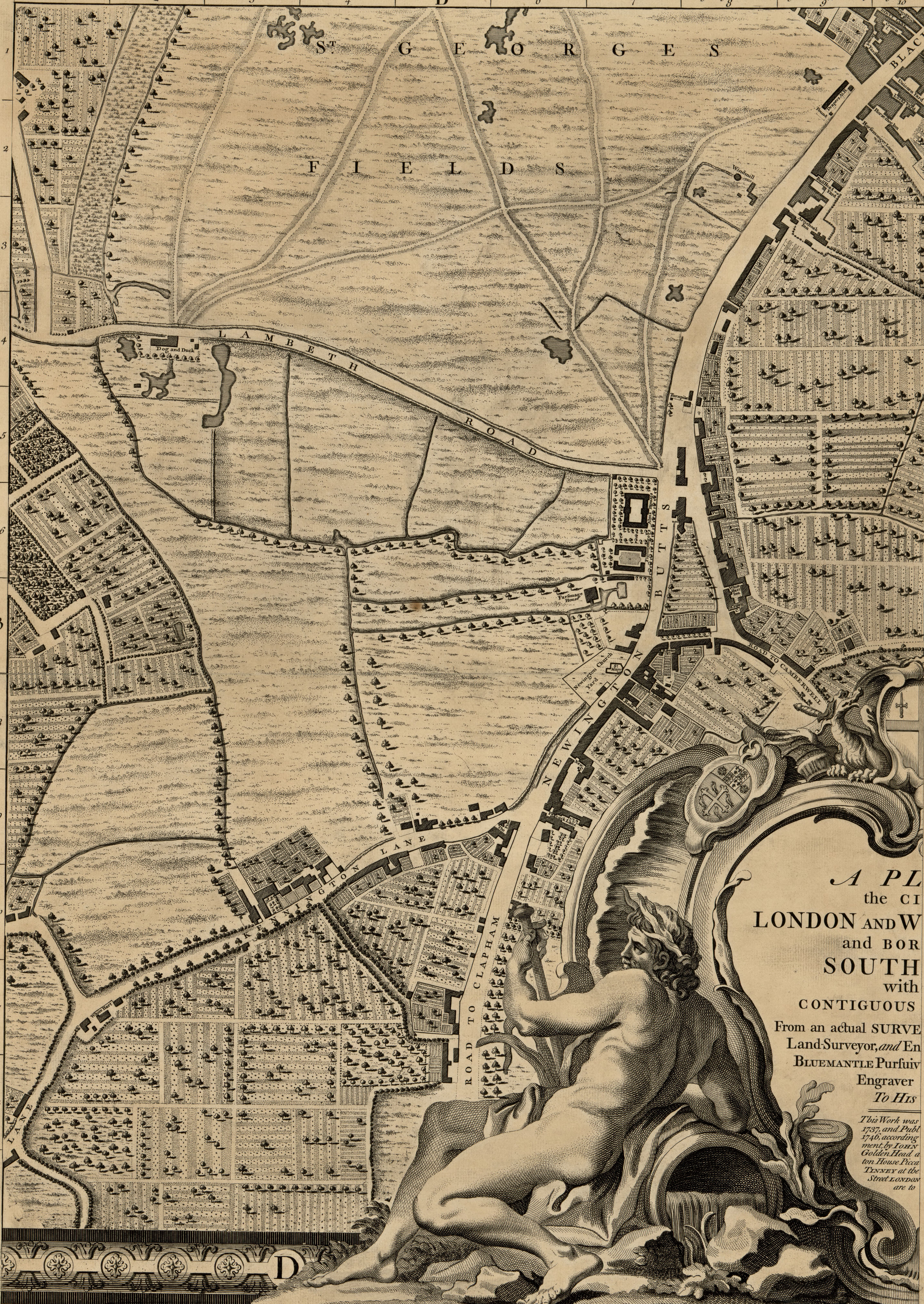
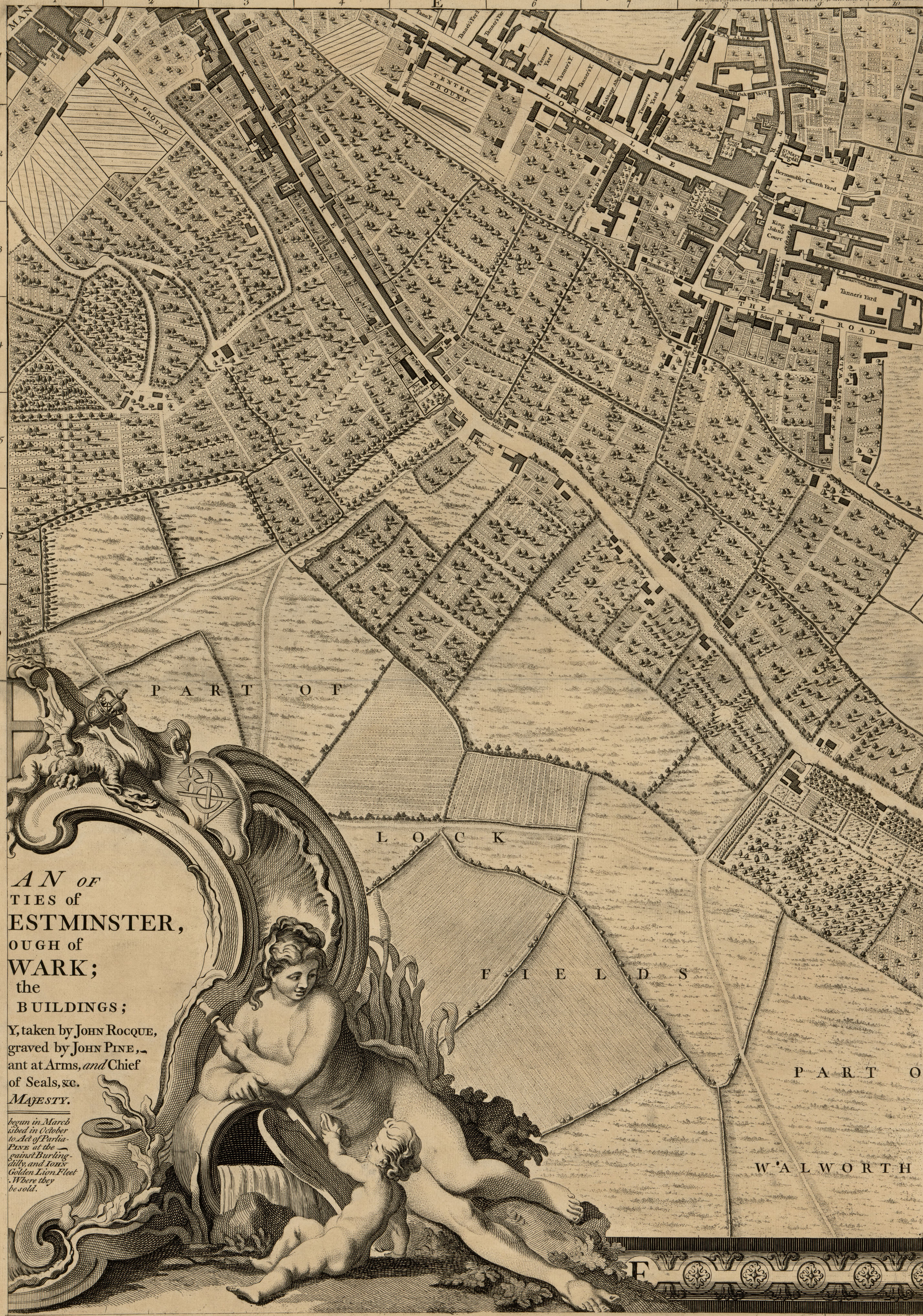
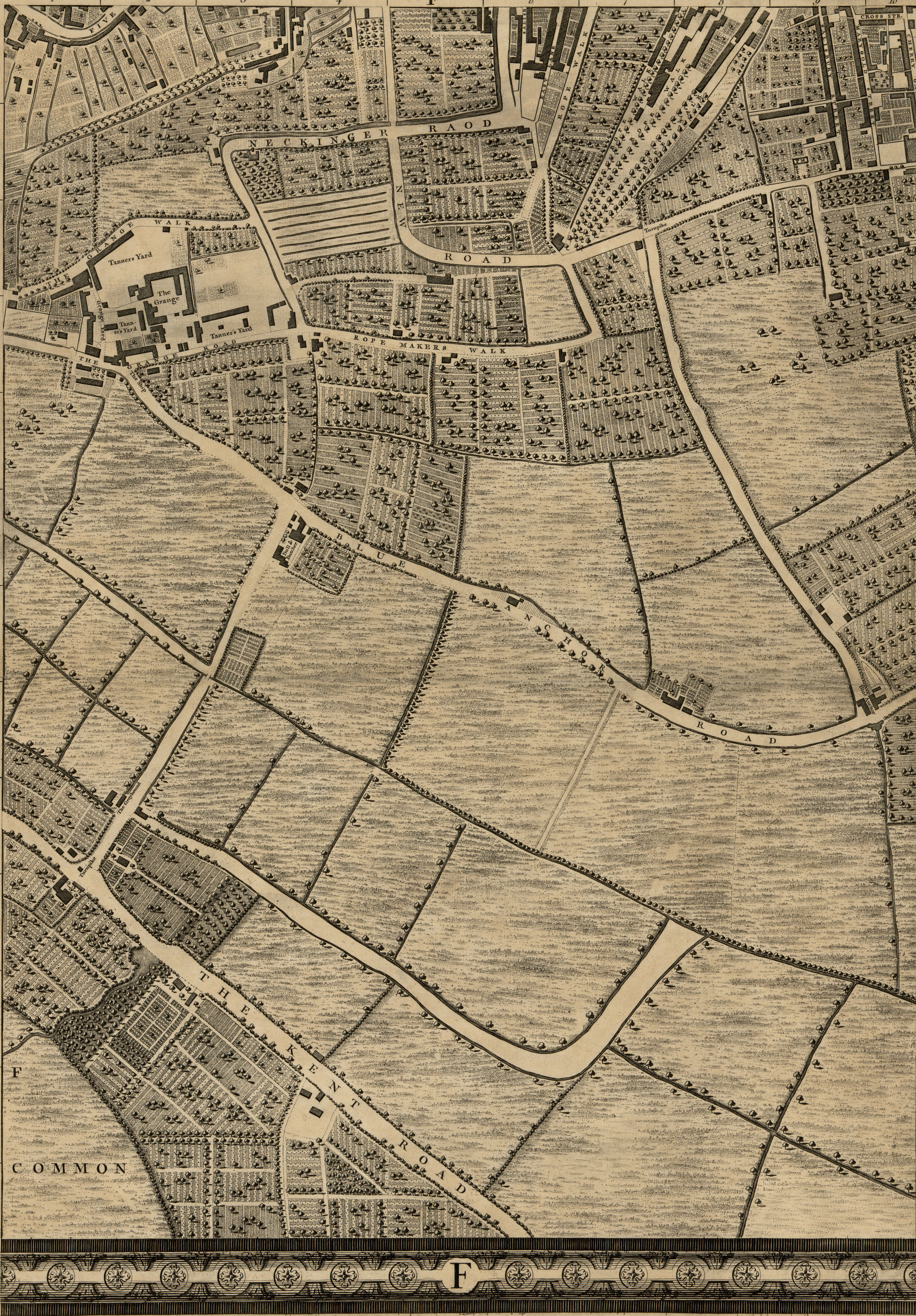
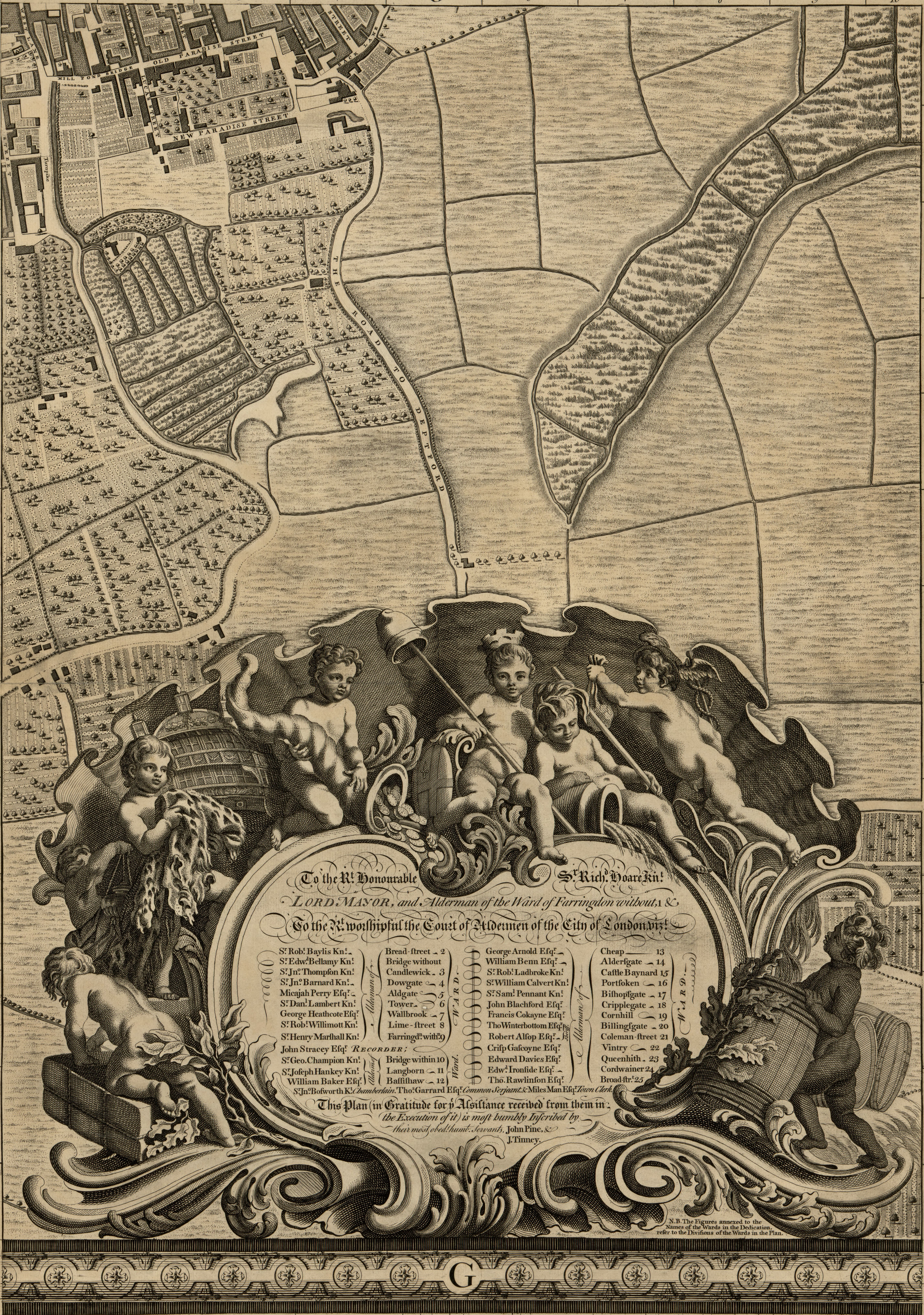
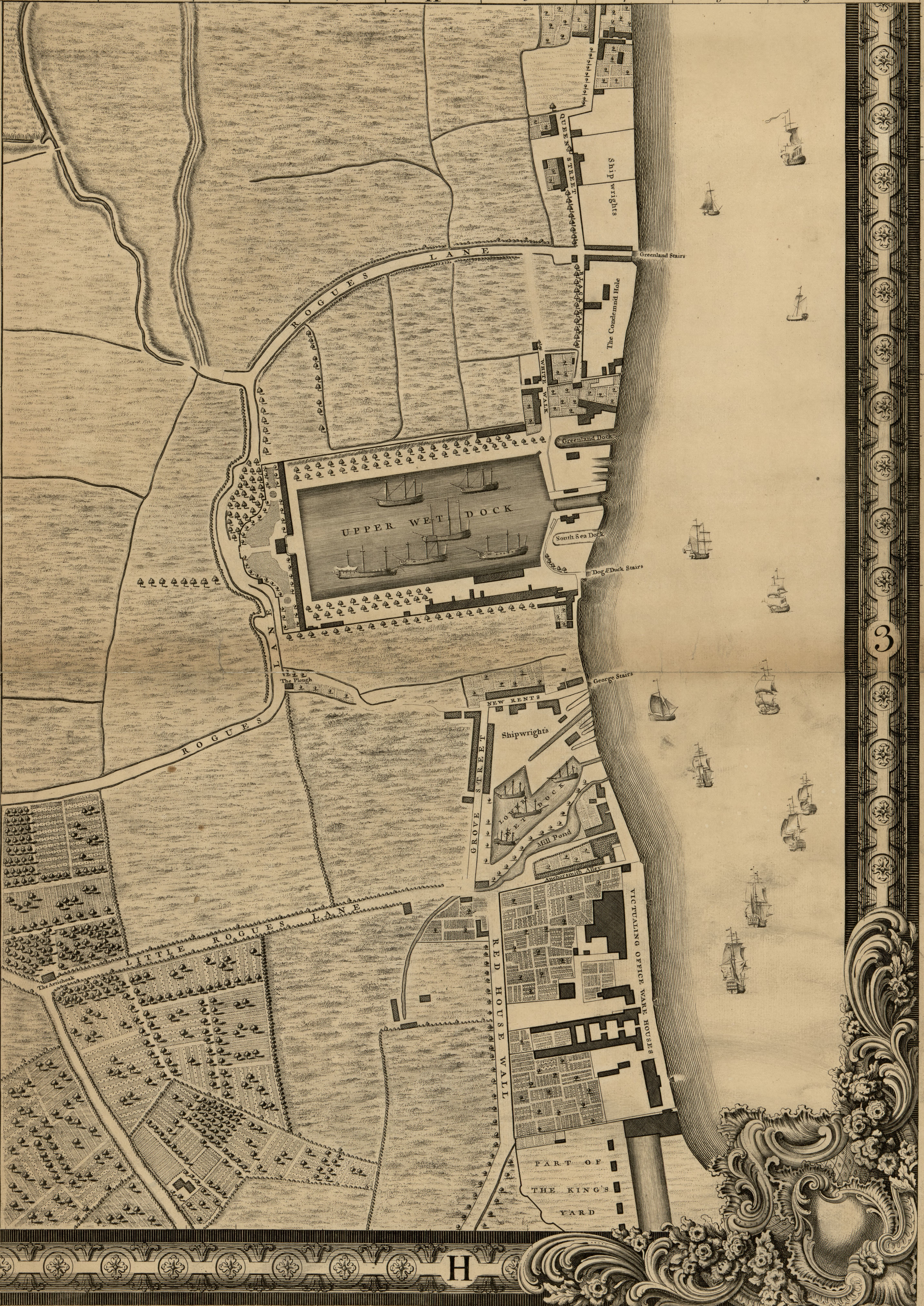
A	B	C	D	E	F	G	H
								1
								2
								3
Each sheet is a separate clickable image

=== Alphabetical index ===
Key to the index for the map

Roque and Pine's index consisted of a series of sections such as Alleys or Ditches or Churches – nineteen in all – each section containing locations listed alphabetically. For each location the index specified the sheet as the numeric row followed by the alphabetic column. Each sheet was notionally divided into nine rectangles as illustrated in their diagram. This number came last. So, the bottom right of the whole map was 3 H 9.

=== Legacy ===
The map has been described as the most detailed and accurate map of 18th-century London ever produced. (Note: Richard Horwood's map of 1792–1799 is at the same scale, covers a somewhat greater area and is arguably more detailed.)

In 1981 a reduced facsimile edition of the map was published in volume format by Harry Margary in association with the Guildhall Library, with a superimposed grid, full place-name index, and introductory notes by Ralph Hyde, under the title The A to Z of Georgian London.

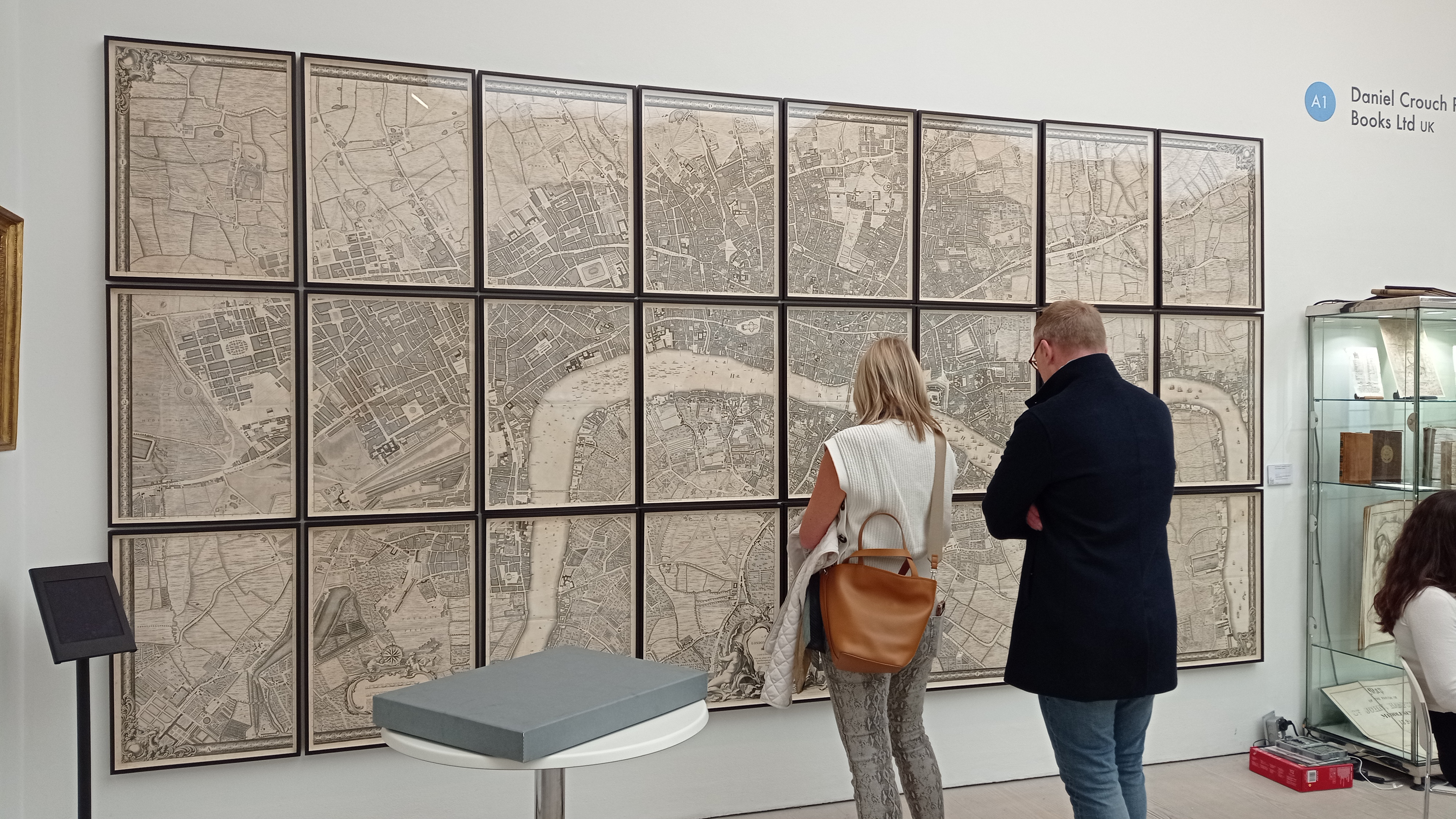
Admiring Rocque's map at the Firsts book fair in London, 2021

Rocque's map forms the basis of a 21st-century project, Locating London's Past, to provide a GIS interface for researchers to map and visualise data concerning texts and artefacts that relate to the 17th and 18th centuries. To correct for distortions in the surveying and in the original paper sheets, a transformation of the map was required to rectify the images for georeferencing – Rauxloh provides an illustration of the requirement. The high resolution digital images of the 1746 map were supplied from the now-defunct Motco image database.

In 2014, an example of the map was sold for £86,500 at auction at Christie's in London.

A 2008 historical crime drama, City of Vice, is a British television series set in Georgian London. To link between the various narrative scenes, Rocque's map is shown from above, then becomes three dimensional, and finally merges into the next film sequence.

A high resolution copy of the map can be downloaded from the Library of Congress.

== The Country Near Ten Miles Round ==
In addition to the map of central London, a separate map of the Country Near Ten Miles Round was also published by Rocque in 1746. The map was originally printed in 16 sheets. The map is dedicated to Richard Boyle, 3rd Earl of Burlington at the bottom centre. A key to symbols distinguishing orchards, arable land, formal parkland and gardens, pasture, and woodland is included at bottom right.

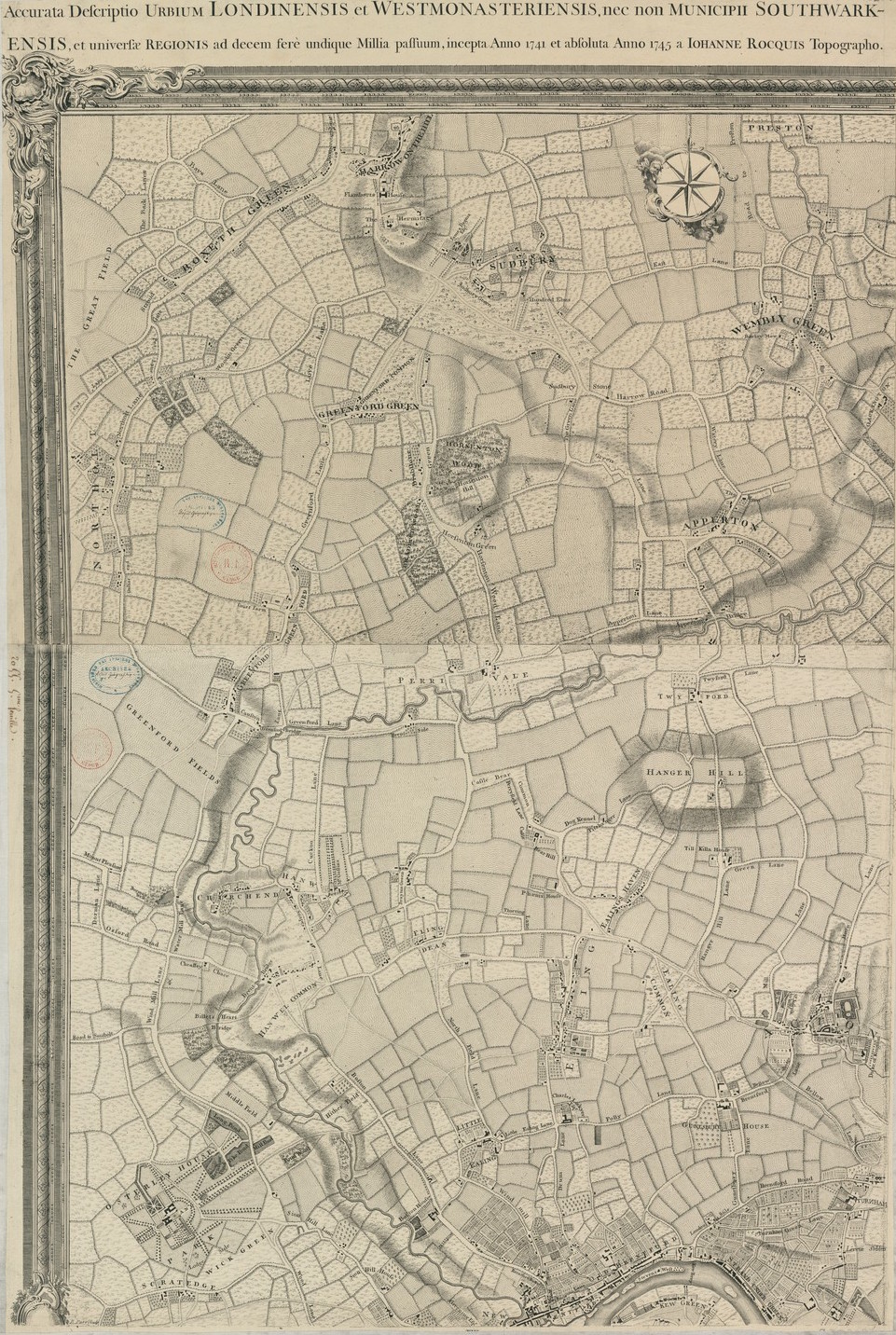
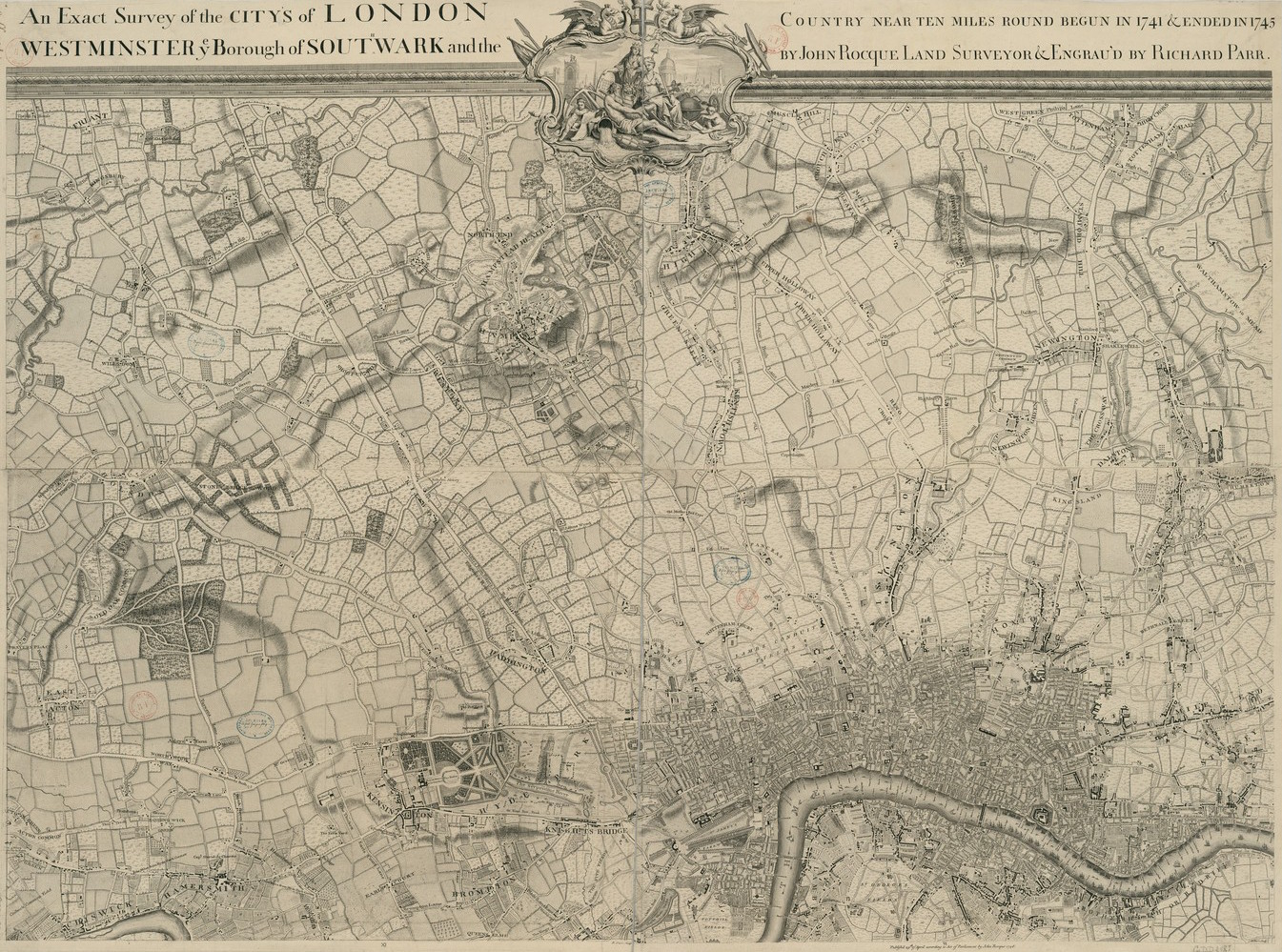
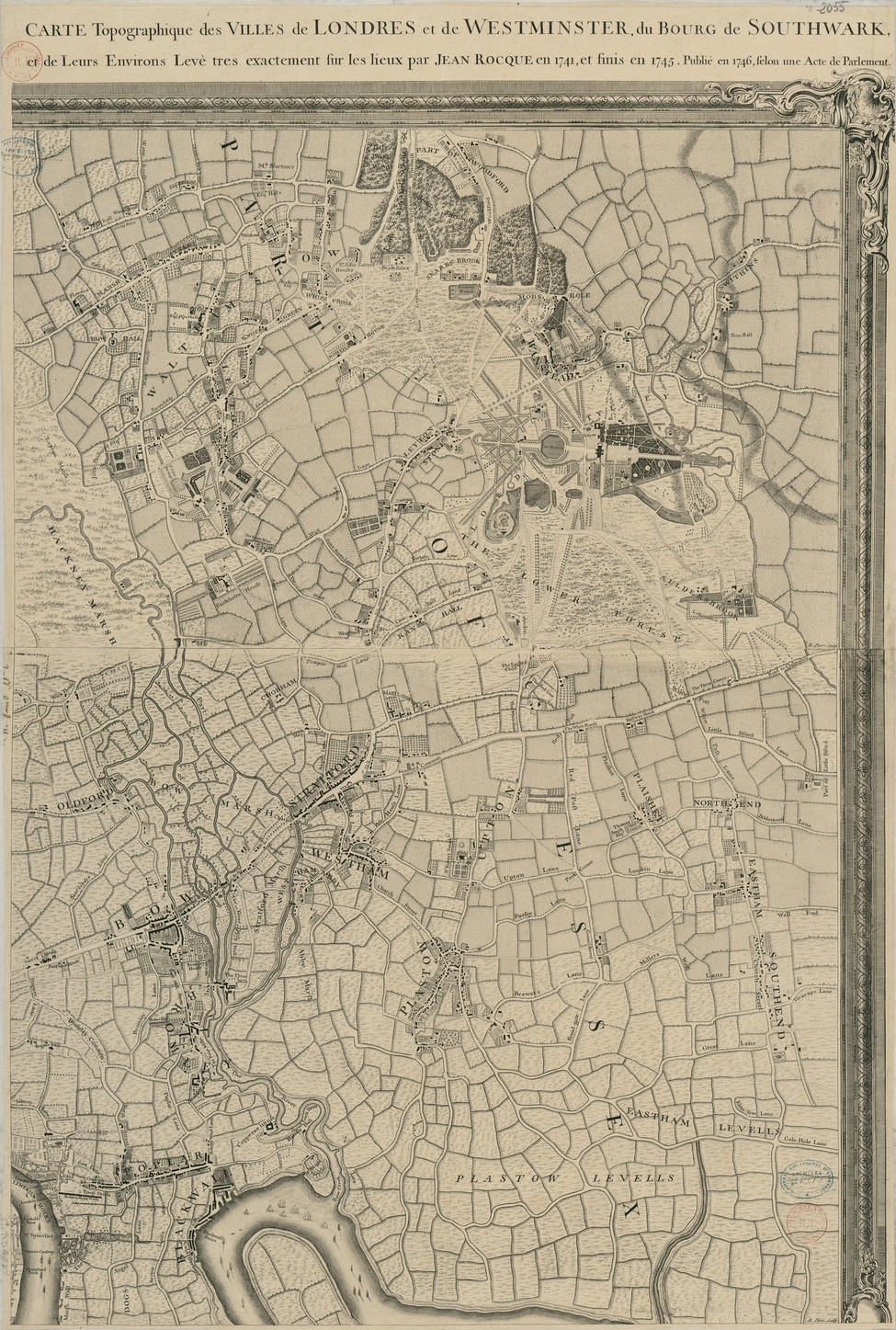
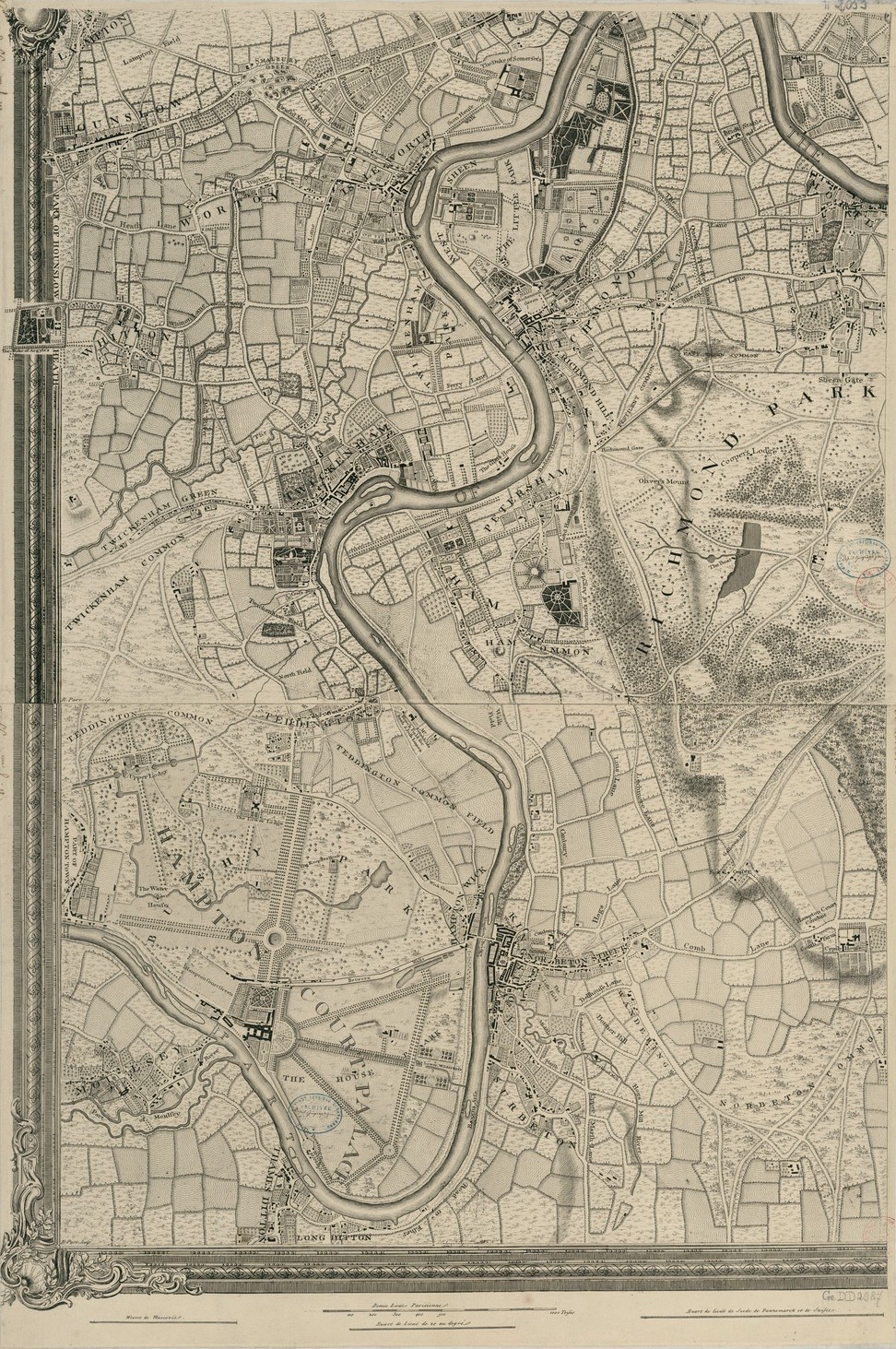
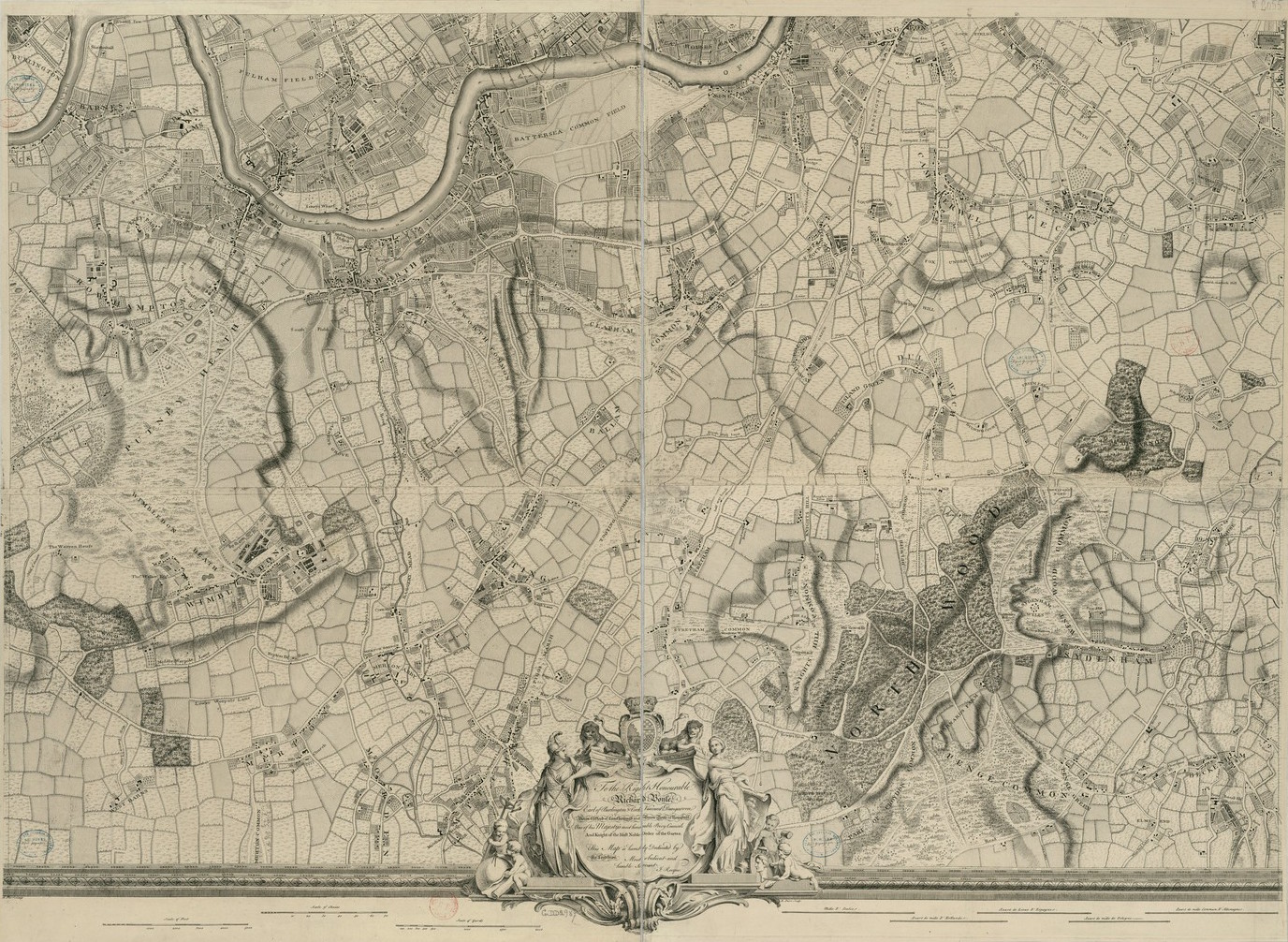
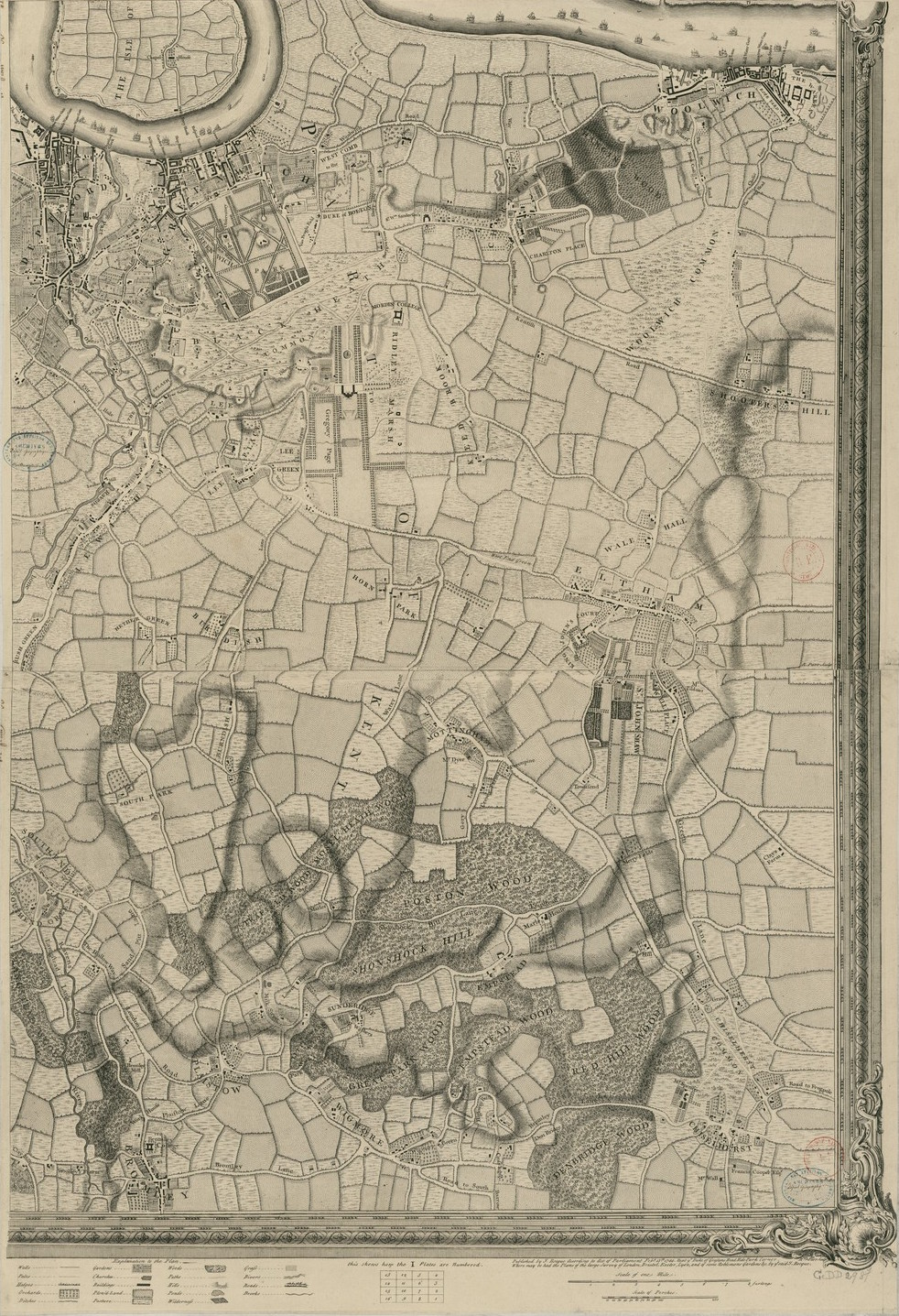
A	B	C
			1
			2
Each sheet is a separate clickable image

== See also ==
- Turgot map of Paris, similar highly detailed 18th-century map
