= List of industrial schools =

This is a list of industrial schools, a type of school that teaches vocational training, domestic training, and manual labour. The list includes active and defunct schools.

== Australia ==
- Newcastle Industrial School for Girls, Newcastle, New South Wales, Australia
- Parramatta Girls Industrial School, Parramatta, New South Wales, Australia

== Canada ==
- Battleford Industrial School in Battleford, Northwest Territories (now Saskatchewan)
- Kuper Island Indian Industrial School in Kuper Island, British Columbia
- Qu'Appelle Industrial School in Qu'Appelle Valley, Saskatchewan
- Victoria Industrial School for Boys (now the Mimico Correctional Centre) in Mimico, Ontario

== England ==
- East London Industrial School in London
- St George's Roman Catholic Boys Industrial School in Everton
- Meath Protestant Industrial School for Boys in Blackrock

== New Zealand ==
- Burnham Industrial School
- Stoke Industrial School in Stoke, Nelson

== United States ==
=== Alabama ===
- Alabama Industrial School for Negro Children in Montgomery, Alabama
- Alabama Girls’ Industrial School (now University of Montevallo) in Montevallo, Alabama
- Anniston Normal and Industrial School in Anniston, Alabama
- Miller's Ferry Normal and Industrial School in Millers Ferry, Alabama
- Montgomery Industrial School for Girls in Montgomery, Alabama
- Kowaliga Academy and Industrial Institute (or Kowaliga School) in Kowaliga, Alabama

=== Arkansas ===
- Arkansas Negro Boys' Industrial School in Jefferson County, Arkansas

=== California ===
- Cogswell Technical School (later known as University of Silicon Valley), San Francisco, California
- San Francisco Industrial School in San Francisco, California
- Stimson Lafayette Industrial School, Los Angeles, 1896-1904.

=== Florida ===
- Daytona Normal and Industrial School in Daytona Beach, Florida
- Florida Industrial School for Boys in Marianna, Florida

=== Georgia ===
- Haines Normal and Industrial School in Augusta, Georgia
- Fort Valley High and Industrial School in Fort Valley, Georgia
- Secondary Industrial School in Columbus, Georgia
- Thomas Jefferson Elder High and Industrial School in Sandersville, Georgia

=== Illinois ===
- Illinois Industrial School for Girls in Park Ridge, Illinois

=== Iowa ===
- Iowa Industrial School for Girls in Mitchellville, Iowa

=== Kansas ===
- Kansas Industrial School for Girls, Beloit, Kansas

=== Louisiana ===
- Colored Industrial and Agricultural School in Grambling, Louisiana

=== Maine ===
- Maine Industrial School for Girls, Hallowell, Maine

=== Massachusetts ===
- Hebrew Industrial School for Girls in Boston, Massachusetts
- Lancaster Industrial School for Girls, Lancaster, Massachusetts

=== Michigan ===
- Big Rapids Industrial School in Big Rapids, Michigan
- Mount Pleasant Indian Industrial Boarding School in Mt. Pleasant, Michigan

=== Minnesota ===
- Morris Industrial School for Indians in Morris, Minnesota

=== New York ===
- Columbia Religious and Industrial School for Jewish Girls, New York City, New York
- Howard Orphanage and Industrial Institute (also known as Howard Colored Orphan Asylum), New York City, New York
- School of Industrial Art, New York City, New York

=== Ohio ===
- Cleveland Industrial School in Cleveland, Ohio
- Sallie McCall Industrial School in Cincinnati, Ohio

=== Pennsylvania ===
- Avery College in Pittsburgh
- Berean Institute in Philadelphia
- Carlisle Indian Industrial School in Carlisle, Pennsylvania
- Downingtown Industrial and Agricultural School in Chester County, Pennsylvania
- St. Francis Industrial School in Eddington, Pennsylvania
- Thaddeus Stevens Industrial School of Lancaster in Lancaster, Pennsylvania

=== North Carolina ===
- Slater State Normal and Industrial School in Winston-Salem, North Carolina
- State Normal and Industrial College (now University of North Carolina at Greensboro) in Greensboro, North Carolina

=== South Carolina ===
- Denmark Industrial School in Denmark, South Carolina

=== South Dakota ===
- Northern Normal and Industrial School, Northern State University in Aberdeen, South Dakota

=== Tennessee ===
- Mayers' Industrial School in Knoxville, Tennessee
- Turner Normal and Industrial School in Shelbyville, Tennessee

=== Vermont ===
- Vermont Industrial School in Vergennes, Vermont

=== Virginia ===
- Hampton Agricultural and Industrial School in Hampton, Virginia
- Northern Neck Industrial Academy in Ivondale, Virginia; for black students
- Virginia Industrial Home School for Colored Girls near Mechanicsville, Virginia
- Virginia Home and Industrial School for Girls in Bon Air, Virginia; reform school for white girls
- Rappahannock Industrial Academy near Dunnsville, Virginia; for black students
- State Normal and Industrial School for Women in Harrisonburg, Virginia
- Saint Paul Normal and Industrial School in Lawrenceville, Virginia
- State Normal and Industrial School for Women in Harrisonburg, Virginia
- St. Emma Industrial and Agricultural Institute in Powhatan County, Virginia

=== West Virginia ===
- Lakin Industrial School in Lakin, West Virginia

=== Wisconsin ===
- Wisconsin Industrial School for Girls in Milwaukee, Wisconsin

== Timor-Leste ==
- Escola Industrial e Comercial Prof. Silva Cunha, Dili (closed 1975)

== See also ==
- Industrial school (Great Britain)
- Boys Industrial School (disambiguation)
- Manual labor college
- Reform school
- Training school (United States)
- Vocational education
