= Industrial school =

Industrial school may refer to:

- Schools offering an industrial education in the United States such as Manual labor colleges
- Industrial school (Ireland) in Ireland
- Industrial school (Great Britain) in Great Britain
- Industrieschule in German-speaking countries (Switzerland, Austria, Germany)
- List of industrial schools
