= Boys Industrial School =

Boys Industrial School may refer to:

- Arkansas Negro Boys' Industrial School in Arkansas
- Boys Industrial School in Lancaster, Ohio, predecessor of Southeastern Correctional Institution
- Colorado State Industrial School for Boys in Golden, Colorado

== See also ==
- Kerry Home Industrial School for Protestant Boys in Tralee, Ireland
- Florida Industrial School for Boys (Florida School for Boys) in Marianna, Florida
- List of industrial schools
