= George H. Jackson (politician) =

Ohio politician

George Henry Jackson
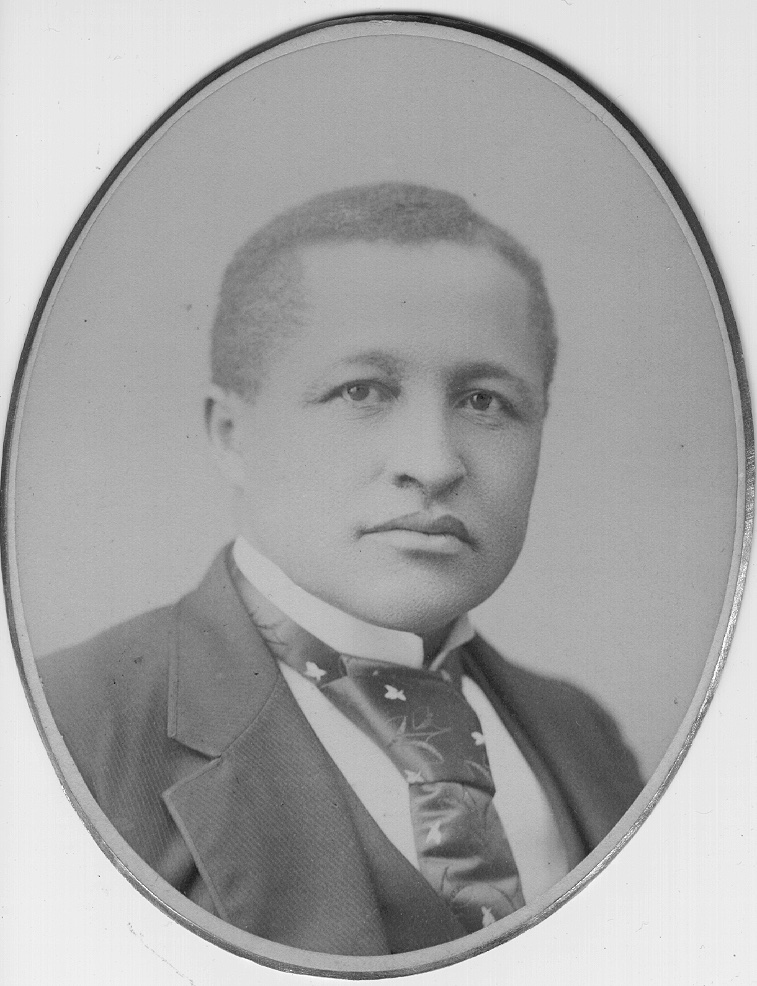

Member of the Ohio House of Representatives
- In office 1892–1893

Personal details
- Born: October 4, 1847 Canada West
- Died: March 1925 (aged 77) Chicago, Illinois, U.S.
- Party: Republican
- Spouse: Virginia Gordon
- Children: 2
- Education: Shaw University, Yale University
- Occupation: Politician, lawyer, educator, real estate business, coal business

George Henry Jackson (1847–1925) was a Canadian-born American politician, lawyer, educator, and businessman. He served in the Ohio House of Representatives for Hamilton County, from 1892 to 1893. He was a Republican.

== Biography ==
Jackson was born October 4, 1847, in Canada West, to parents Julia (née Burke) and George. His grandparents were Black and had been enslaved by the Custis family in Arlington, Virginia. Jackson was raised in Lafayette, Indiana, and in Cincinnati, Ohio. He studied teaching under Peter Clark.

In his early career he taught at schools in the Ohio Valley. He married Virginia Gordon in 1879, and his father in-law was Robert Gordon, a wealthy Cincinnati coal dealer. He attended Shaw University, and Yale University. Jackson started practicing law in 1884. He served in the Ohio House of Representatives for Hamilton County, from 1892 to 1893.

Jackson was a trustee for the New Orphan Asylum for Colored Children, the Crawford Old Men's Home, and the Sallie McCall Industrial School of Cincinnati. He also worked in the real estate and coal business in Chicago.

== Personal life ==
His son, Dr. Gordon Henry Jackson (1885–1945) married Mae Walker (née Fairy Mae Bryant), the adopted daughter of A'Lelia Walker, whose mother was the millionaire hair care entrepreneur Madam C. J. Walker, in New York on November 24, 1923.

== See also ==
- African American officeholders from the end of the Civil War until before 1900
