= Annie E. Casey Foundation =

American charitable foundation

- Abbreviation: AECF
- Formation: 1948
- Type: Foundation
- Headquarters: Baltimore, Maryland, United States
- President: Lisa Hamilton
- Revenue: $159,583,516 (2015)
- Expenses: $208,727,421 (2015)
- Website: www.aecf.org

The Annie E. Casey Foundation (AECF) is a charitable foundation based in Baltimore, Maryland, that funds and publishes work related to children, families, child welfare, and youth in the United States.

The AECF publishes annual data on child well-being through its Kids Count Data Book.

== History ==
The AECF was started in 1948 in Seattle by UPS founder James E. Casey and his siblings George, Harry and Marguerite. Their foundation was named in honor of their mother. The foundation moved to Baltimore in 1994.

Originally a charity, chiefly focused on providing foster care, the organization gradually shifted to a broader role in attempting to advance child well-being through social experimentation, research and publicity. Along the way, it divested its direct services foster care operation, while increasing its focus on family-strengthening (a model that was proposed by the AECF) economic stability, community change research, advocacy and action.

Through its extensive publicity efforts, the AECF has become a major source of information on the welfare of children in the United States,

== Casey Family Services ==
From 1976 to 2012, the AECF operated Casey Family Services, a direct services organization that provided foster care and family services in the northeastern United States. Starting out in Connecticut and Vermont, the program expanded throughout New England and into Maryland before its closure in 2012.

== Child well-being publicity and publications ==
Among the organization's practices is the development of "public accountability" for child welfare outcomes—through continuing publication, and publicizing, of research and comparative data that assess the health and wellness of children in the various states and communities across the nation. In addition to reports, AECF operates the KIDS COUNT Data Center, which features national, state, and local data on the well-being of kids and families in the U.S.

In keeping with this goal, the foundation is a regular contributor to public broadcasting, including National Public Radio.

In another key form of "public accountability", the foundation develops several written publications reporting the current status of children across the nation, state-by-state.

In particular, the foundation produces a detailed, annual child-welfare research report, the KIDS COUNT Data Book (also known as the Kids Count or simply the Data Book), surveying the well-being of children in the 50 US states, ranking the states on 10 core indicators, and overall—drawing heavily on documented sources and official reports. This reference book, printed every year since 1990, is considered one of the foremost reference documents—for academics, media, business and public leaders—on child health and well-being in the United States, and particularly in each of the 50 states, comparatively.

In 2014, the organization also released its Race for Results Index, comparing the previous 23 years of data accumulated on the well-being of America's children—intending to start a national conversation about startling disparities between racial and ethnic groups. For the first time, this index was based on indicators of success: reading and math proficiency, high school graduation rates, teen birthrates, employment futures, neighborhood poverty levels, family income and education levels. Standardized scores, indicating the children's likelihood of success in adult life, were presented for each state and racial group (where valid data was available) using data gathered between 2010 and 2013.

The foundation also sponsors (or produces), and distributes, research reports and white papers on various topics involving child welfare and related programs and public policy issues.

== Child welfare development grants ==
The foundation works with—and makes grants to—governments (particularly states), universities and civic organizations, to improve conditions for children.

AECF describes the grantees as the "KIDS COUNT Network" and uses them as outlets for its outreach communications and influence efforts, although it accepts that their individual priorities and goals may vary somewhat from AECF's.

== Juvenile justice alternatives ==
The Juvenile Detention Alternatives Initiative (JDAI), a project developed in 1992 by the AECF, demonstrates ways for jurisdictions to safely reduce reliance on secure confinement of children, and strengthen juvenile justice systems through interrelated reform strategies. The JDAI reports that it is now being copied in approximately "200 jurisdictions in 39 states and the District of Columbia". The U.S. Department of Justice Office of Juvenile Justice and Delinquency Prevention (OJJDP) has worked directly and extensively with the AECF on these issues, as well.

The JDAI Helpdesk used to be an online information tool for juvenile justice advocates, practitioners, policymakers, and other parties seeking to improve juvenile justice systems, sharing the juvenile justice "best practices", research and materials produced by JDAI jurisdictions. Featured materials included strategies and tools documented to safely reduce secure confinements, while improving public safety, avoiding costs and doing "what works for youth" to develop them into "healthy, productive adults".

The JDAI Helpdesk was operated—in partnership with the AECF—by the Pretrial Justice Institute.

One prominent success story is the Bon Air Juvenile Correctional Center near Richmond, Virginia. AECF provided technical expertise to assist the Virginia Department of Juvenile Justice in significantly reducing juvenile prison populations.

== Thrive by 25 ==
In 2021, the AECF announced an initiative called Thrive by 25, which is meant to increase its focus on improving the lives of youth and young adults. Over 10 years, the organization will dedicate at least 50 percent of its philanthropic investments to ensure that young people between the ages 14 and 24 have the family connections, relationships, communities, and educational and employment opportunities they need to succeed.

== Financial affairs ==
A detailed review of AECF financial history and current finances, in a Stanford University case study is available online, partially as a web page, but completely as a downloadable PDF file.

== See also ==
- Casey Family Programs
