= Rukus! Black LGBT Archive =

British collection in London

rukus! Black LGBT Archive is a collection of materials related to Black lesbian, gay, bisexual and transgender communities in Great Britain. The archive consists of diaries, letters, meeting minutes and related organising papers, magazines, pamphlets, flyers, posters, journals, books, photographs and assorted prints, audio-visual material, memorabilia and ephemera mainly, but not exclusively covering people, places and activity based in London. The materials have been gathered from and donated by individuals, activists, DJs, club promoters, writers, artists, community organisations and publishers from within and outside Black lesbian, gay, bisexual and transgender communities.

The archive is housed at The London Archives in Clerkenwell, London. It is the first of its kind in Europe. In 2008, rukus! won the 'Archives Landmark Award'.

The archive strives to establish, maintain and make publicly accessible a "living Black LGBT history archive", produce and contribute to "exhibitions, publications, talks, workshops and educational resource materials" that can "raise awareness of our lives and visibility of our history and culture" and provide access to oral histories and interviews that "preserve a record of our lives and testimonies".

== Beginnings ==
'rukus! Federation Limited', a charity, was founded in 2000 by artist, curator, archivist and activist Ajamu X and filmmaker, artist and writer Topher Campbell. The two named the archive by combining 'rukus', after an African-American porn star of the same name, with 'Federation', a tribute to Campbell's love of the sci-fi television series 'Star Trek'.

Led by Richard Wiltshire, Senior Archivist, London Metropolitan Archives (now The London Archives) and with assistance of Ajamu X and Topher Campbell, the archive was catalogued between 2011-2014 by the rukus! volunteer project. The catalogue was completed in February 2015.

When speaking about his desire to start the archive, Ajamu X describes his motivation being born out of a

"frustration around how Black queer narratives start from a deficit paradigm: something is wrong that needs to be fixed. And there is rarely a conversation that starts from a place of our cultural production, celebration, abundance. And your material, social history rarely includes the Black experience, and your wider LGBT history rarely includes a Black experience. We rarely appear in terms of narrative, and where we do we're always framed within the problematics of being Black and gay, whereby your white person is out and confident. There is a generation of younger, fabulous Black queers who might not be aware of what's happened in Black life in the last twenty-plus years."

== Archive Contents and Scope ==
The archive covers subjects including Black LGBT sexual heath, night and social life, cultural life, political and community organising.

Records mainly cover London-based individuals and activities, but also make reference to initiatives in other U.K. cities as well as Nigeria, and New York, U.S.A. The materials date between 1976 to 2010.

== Exhibitions and Events ==
The archive has been involved in and activated as part of many projects, events, exhibitions, and book launches including:

=== 2024 - 2025 ===
'Making a rukus! Black Queer Histories Through Love and Resistance', Somerset House, London.

'Topher Campbell: My rukus! Heart', Tate Modern, London.

=== 2020-2021 ===
'Living Archive: rukus!', The Horse Hospital, London.

=== 2011 ===
'Crossing Deep Waters', London South Bank University.

=== 2010 ===
'Conjuring Black Funk' Book Launch by Dr. Herukhuti, Brixton Library, Lambeth.

rukus! archive Launch, London Metropolitan Archives.

Thomas Glave, Gay's the Word Bookshop.

=== 2009 ===
Mangina Monologues, dir. Lois Weaver by Dr L Bridgman & Serge Nicholson, Soho Theatre, Soho, Westminster

=== 2008 ===
'Open Space 2' - An event to explore and share the histories of Black, Asian and Minority Ethnic communities connected to Soho and the West End.

'Lambeth's Black Queer Pulse' - Informal discussions that shed light on the unique place Brixton holds within the Black LGBT experience in the United Kingdom.

'Outside Edge. A Journey Through Black British Lesbian and Gay History', London Museum Docklands.

'Glorious Outpourings', Brixton Library, Lambeth: Readings by Dirg Aaab-Richards, Steven G. Fulwood, Dean Atta and Jay Bernard.

Steven G. Fulwood - Readings and Book Signing at Gay's The Word Bookshop: in partnership with Outburst UK.

=== 2007 ===
'In This Our Lives....The Reunion', which celebrated the 20th anniversary of the first ever black gay men's conference. London South Bank University.

Thomas Glave - Readings and Book Signing at Gay's The Word Bookshop: in partnership with Outburst UK.

Queens Jewels opens at Homotopia Festival, Liverpool.

Black Gay and Scouse, roundtable discussion with members of Liverpool's black LGBT community.

=== 2006 ===
'Queens Jewels'- launches the London Borough of Lambeth's first LGBT History month events. Largest Black Gay event in country.

'Doin' The Low' with Keith Boykin (writer and former advisor to President Bill Clinton) in Association with London Lesbian and Gay Film Festival.

'The Fire This Time' in association with 'Chroma Journal' held at Woman's Library, London 2005. A one-day event with workshops (Film, Photography and writing) and performances.

=== 2005 ===
'Queens Jewels Exhibition and Archive Launch', The Globe Centre, East End, London.

Film Party Launch during Lesbian and Gay Film Festival for African American Maurice Jamal Director of Ski Trip and Dirty laundry.

Ajamu X and Topher Campbell guest Speakers at Pride Rally main stage, Trafalgar Square, London.

Ajamu X and Topher Campbell talk at London Metropolitan Archives third annual Lesbian and Gay History conference.
