= Brown Bear, Whitechapel =

Pub in Whitechapel, London

Coordinates: 51.511420°N 0.0685299°W

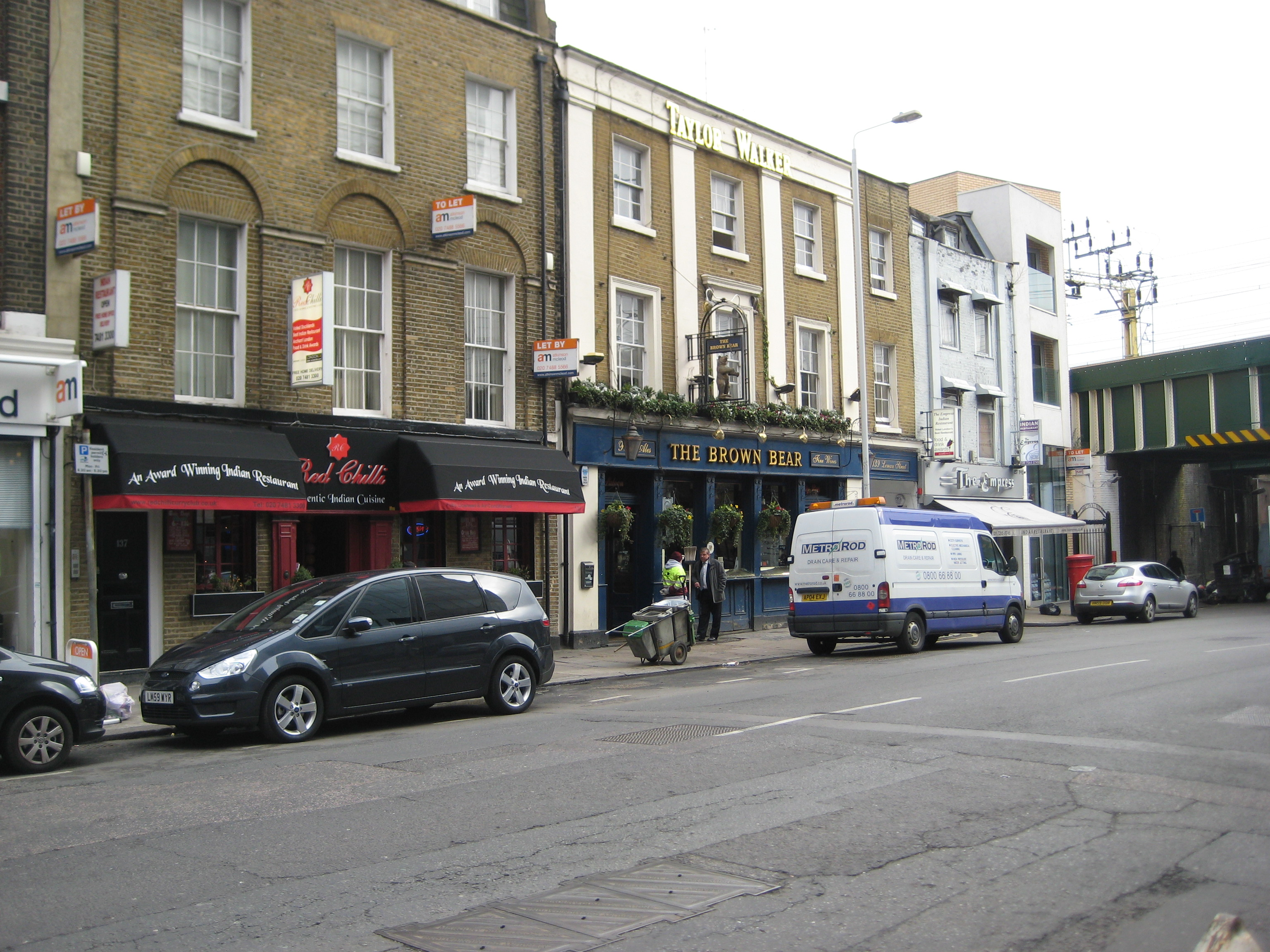
The Brown Bear

The Brown Bear is a pub at 139 Leman Street, Whitechapel, London E1.

It is a Grade II listed building, dating back to the early 19th century.
