= Virginia Home and Industrial School for Girls =

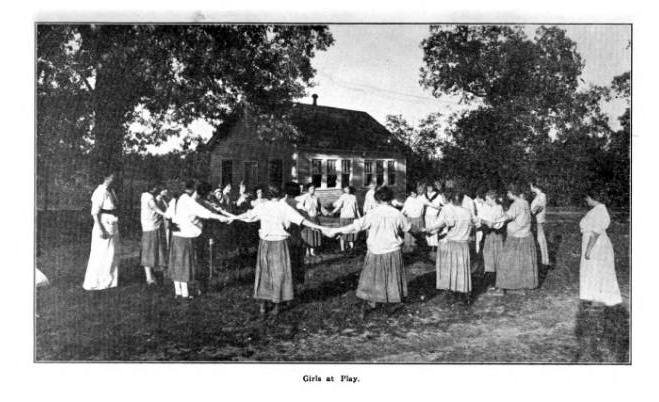
Virginia Home and Industrial School for Girls - Girls at Play, 1914

The Virginia Home and Industrial School for Girls, a reformatory, opened in 1910 in Bon Air, Chesterfield County as a private charity to confine and train “incorrigible” White girls under the age of eighteen. Black girls were sent to the Virginia Industrial Home School for Colored Girls.

Despite its name, the reformatory functioned largely as a juvenile prison, as girls were sentenced there by the Commonwealth's circuit, police, and juvenile courts for charges ranging from incorrigibility, truancy, and vagrancy to assault, theft and “immorality” crimes such as solicitation and prostitution. Girls officially served under the authority of the reformatory until they were paroled for good behavior, transferred into other state institutions, or until they reached the age of 21, whichever came first. Attempted escapes were frequent.

At first, the reformatory operated with partial state support on a farm of approximately 200 acres (81 ha) in Bon Air. The first superintendents were Rev. James Buchanan and his wife Abbie. Several others followed them in quick succession.

In the summer of 1913, a controversy arose over the employment of a Black man who supervised the White girls’ outdoor exercise. After an investigation, the superintendent resigned and the State Board hired Anna M. Petersen, who had received a degree from Western Reserve University and a certificate in eugenics from the Brooklyn Institute of Arts and Science in Cold Spring Harbor. Petersen renamed the Virginia Home and Industrial School for Girls as “Kilbourne Farm,“ the land’s original designation.

This girls reformatory evolved over time to become a co-ed, racially integrated state reformatory that is now known as the Bon Air Juvenile Correctional Center, operated by the Virginia Department of Juvenile Justice. Bon Air is the only long-term residential juvenile co-ed reformatory in the state.
