= Daytona Normal and Industrial School =

Coordinates: 29.2128°N 81.03177°W

- Daytona Beach, Florida; United States

Information
- Established: 1904
- Founder: Mary McLeod Bethune
- Closed: 1923
- Gender: Co-ed

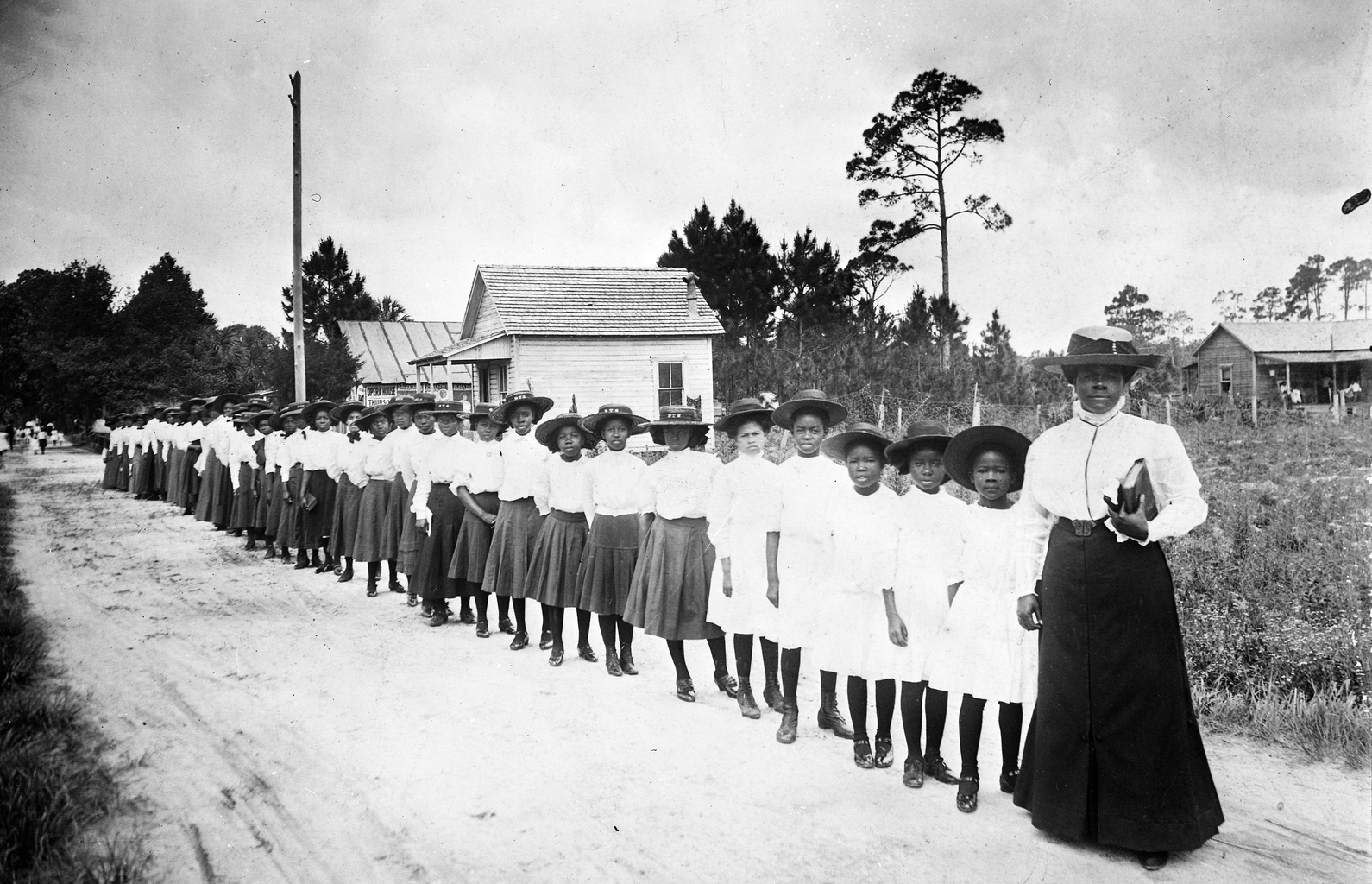
Mary McLeod Bethune with a line of girls from the school in 1905

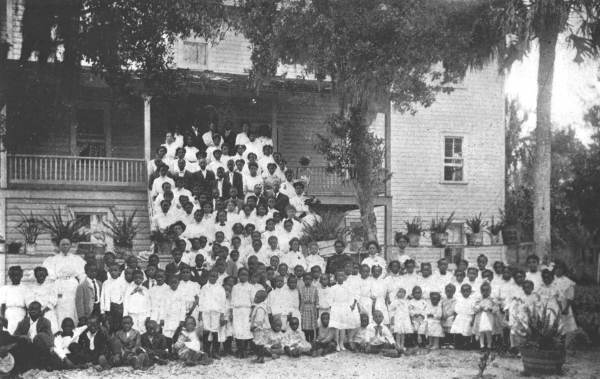
Girls at the school library circa 1919

Daytona Normal and industrial School, originally Daytona Educational and Industrial Training School for Negro Girls was established in Daytona Beach, Florida, by Mary McLeod Bethune in 1904. Bethune was active in voter registration and campaigning for women's suffrage. Her school was reportedly threatened by the Ku Klux Klan and she stood vigil to protect it.

== History ==
Bethune moved to Daytona in 1904, to a house near the railroad tracks, in order to found her own school. Called The Daytona Educational and Industrial Training School for Negro Girls, the boarding school she established initially served five girls and Bethune's son. Within two years four teachers were instructing 250 students. In 1907, Faith Hall was built to house the growing school, but in seven years the school outgrew that. In 1916 the school moved into its new home, White Hall, a Georgian Revival architecture brick building. In 1919 the school became known as Daytona Normal and Industrial Institute.

In 1923, it merged with Bethune and Cookman Institute for Boys to become the Bethune–Cookman University.

== See also ==
- List of industrial schools
- Training school (United States)
