= Ajamu X =

British artist (born 1963)

- Born: 1963 (age 62–63); Huddersfield, West Yorkshire, United Kingdom
- Website: ajamu-studio.com

Ajamu X (born 1963 in Huddersfield) is a British artist, curator, archivist and activist. He is best known for his fine art photography which explores same-sex desire and the black male body, and his work as an archivist and activist to document the lives and experiences of black LGBTQ people in the United Kingdom.

== Early life ==
Ajamu was born in 1963 in Huddersfield to Jamaican parents. His grandparents arrived to England in 1958 and his parents followed in 1962.

Ajamu came out as gay to his parents in his late teens and describes their reaction as "impressively progressive for the times." He studied Black history and photography in Leeds. While in Leeds, he and two friends created the magazine BLAC, an acronym for Black Liberation Activist Core. In October 1987, after seeing it advertised in The Caribbean Times, Ajamu attended the first, and only, National Black Gay Men's Conference held at the Black Lesbian and Gay Centre in Camden. By January the following year, he had moved to London.

He was given the name Ajamu by one of his mentors in 1991; it means "he who fights for what he believes." It is also a reference to Malcolm X, one of Ajamu's first role models. He also describes changing his name to an African one as "very significant."

== Career ==
Ajamu's work highlights stories of black LGBTQ people who he feels are often marginalised from mainstream British society; additionally he has chosen to focus on those who are out and have been accepted by their families. Ajamu has said he rejects the claim that Jamaican culture is particularly homophobic and believes that homophobia exists across cultures and families of all backgrounds.

He often speaks of his work as "sex activism"; he has run "sex parties for men who want to have sex with men" since the 1990s, and same-sex desire and pleasure are recurring themes in his photography. His first major exhibition Black Bodyscapes, in 1994, focused on the private sexual realities of Black gay men. More recent projects include Fierce: Portraits of Young Black Queers, an exhibition of 24 portraits of a "new generation of Black and proudly out young, emerging and established talent" at London's Guildhall Art Gallery in 2014, and I Am For You Can Enjoy with Khalil West at Contact Theatre, Manchester, in 2016, which uses photography and video, to explore the lives of queer Black male sex workers and their clients. Ajamu has describes himself as an "artist who has created an archive."

In 2000 Ajamu and Topher Campbell co-founded rukus! Federation, an "arts company dedicated to celebrating and showcasing the best in challenging, provocative works by black lesbian, gay, bisexual and trans-gender artists nationally and internationally." The Rukus! Black LGBT Archive was deposited at London Metropolitan Archives in 2010.

Ajamu was the manager of the Black LGBT Archive Project, a major initiative to develop an archive collection on "Black Lesbian, Gay, Bisexual and Trans-Gender heritage, history and lived experience in the UK." In 2008 Ajamu co-curated the exhibition Outside Edge: a journey through Black lesbian and gay history at the Museum of Docklands.

Ajamu was the subject of Topher Campbell's first film The Homecoming: A Short Film about Ajamu in 1995. The documentary film Brixton Recreation with Ajamu, directed by Danny Solle, features his experiences of cruising and sex as an out Black gay man in Brixton.

His fine art photography is in national and international collections including the Gallery of Modern Art in Glasgow, Autograph ABP in London, and the Neuberger Museum of Art in New York. Ajamu is co-chair of Centred, an LGBTQ community organisation in Soho.

== Selected exhibitions ==
=== As artist ===
- 1992: From Where I Stand, Brixton Art Gallery, London
- 1994: Black Bodyscapes, Camerawork, London
- 1997: Transforming the Crown, Caribbean Cultural Center, New York.
- 2004: Hidden Histories, Walsall New Art Gallery, England
- 2009: Familiar Strangers, Gallery of Modern Art, Glasgow
- 2010: Photoshow, Leslie-Lohman Museum of Gay and Lesbian Art, New York
- 2011: Queer Self Portraits Now, Fred, London
- 2012: Future Histories, Street Level Photoworks, Glasgow
- 2013: Fierce, Guildhall Art Gallery, London
- 2016: I Am For You Can Enjoy, Contact Theatre, Manchester
- 2019: Diasporic Self – Black Togetherness as Lingua Franca, Framer Framed, Amsterdam

=== As curator ===
- 2008: Outside Edge, Museum of Docklands, London
- 2016: Curatorial Resident, Visual AIDS, New York
