= Kids Count Data Book =

Annual report on child welfare in the US

The Kids Count Data Book is an annual publication of the Annie E. Casey Foundation—at times in cooperation with the Center for the Study of Social Policy—reporting comparative statistics on child welfare in each of the 50 states of the United States.

== Form and content ==
Annual editions are prefaced with the year of publication—hence the 2019 edition is commonly titled 2019 Kids Count Data Book. The book's first annual edition was published in 1990.

Separate editions, for each individual state—with detailed information on that state, plus comparisons to national data—are available. An interactive, online edition is available as well.

Topics covered, in past annual issues, have included U.S. children's economic status, health, education, family and community, child protection, foster care, juvenile justice and incarceration—with current and historical data, and comparative rankings of states.

== Use ==
The book is widely quoted as a leading reference on the subject of child welfare in the United States. In 1992, it was reportedly featured in about 1,400 of America's 1,600 daily newspapers.

== KIDS COUNT Network ==
In each of the 50 states, AECF originally selected a single local child-issues organization to partially fund with an AECF grant, and to partner with to develop a customized version of the Data Book for each state. However, AECF later modified its plan, treating the grantees as its "KIDS COUNT Network", and began to use them as outlets for its media and influence efforts—including distribution and promotion of the KIDS COUNT Data Book—although AECF accepts that the grantees' individual goals and priorities may differ somewhat from AECF's.

== Criticism ==
Critics have suggested that the KIDS COUNT Data Book and other media efforts by AECF (and copycat efforts by other organizations) may be an attempt to promote government spending on social programs, generally—and particularly for the poor—using public sympathy for "kids" to generate public support for social programs that serve adults as well. Others have suggested that it sometimes paints a picture that is more gloomy than realistic.
