= Leman Street =

Street in the London Borough of Tower Hamlets

Coordinates: 51°30′49.13″N 0°4′13.68″W

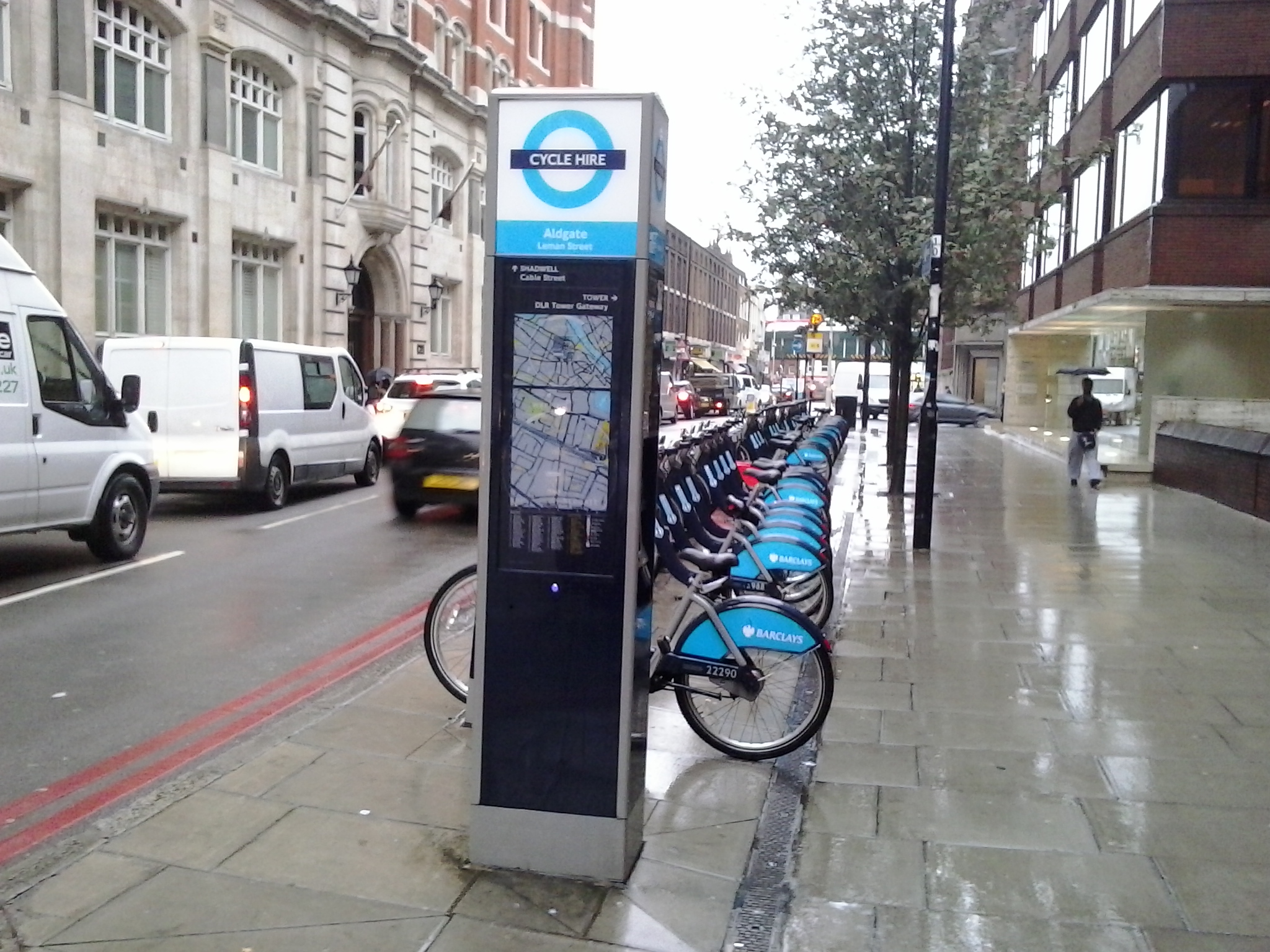
Leman Street on a rainy day in October 2013

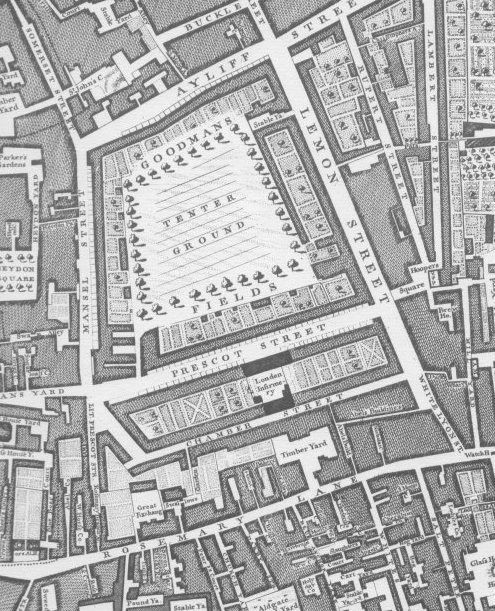
Leman Street (right), marked as Lemon Street, on John Rocque's Map of London, 1746

Leman Street, once known as Lemon Street, is a street in Tower Hamlets. It was built in the seventeenth century as part of the development of Goodman's Fields. It is named after John Leman who was responsible for this development, which also included Ayliff Street, Mansell Street, and Prescot Street.

Over the years the street has been the location of various notable buildings and organisations:

- The Garrick Theatre, opened 27 December 1830. It was destroyed by fire in November 1846, then rebuilt and opened again as The Albert and Garrick Amphitheatre in 1854. Renamed the Royal Albert Theatre in 1873. Demolished in the 1880s.
- The Leman Street Police Station, built on the site of the Royal Albert Theatre and opened in 1891. It was associated with the Whitechapel murders and the Cable Street riots.
- the Brown Bear, a public house, 139 Leman Street;
- East London Industrial School, 43 Leman Street, (renumbered 86 from 1881) from 1872 to 1884;
- Leman Street railway station in operation from 1877 to 1941
- Jews' Temporary Shelter from 1886

In 2002, Trees for Cities, the national urban tree charity, planted over a dozen silver birch, rowan and ornamental pear trees along Leman Street as part of the Whitechapel Street Tree project, which sought to increase tree canopy cover in this area of Tower Hamlets.
