= Topher Campbell =

British film director

- Born: Coventry, England
- Education: University of Sussex
- Occupations: Artist, Filmmaker, Performer, Archivist, Writer, Sculpture

Topher Campbell is an artist filmmaker and writer who has created a range of works in broadcasting, film, theatre, television, performance, installation, exhibitions and archive. His works explores sexuality, masculinity, memoir afro-futurism and the city, particularly in relation to feelings sensations emotions and climate change. Campbell is a Fellow of the Royal Society of Arts, and a past recipient of the Jerwood Directors Award (2005). He holds an honorary doctorate from the University of Sussex for his work in the arts and Black LGBTQ advocacy.

== Early life ==
Campbell was born in Coventry, England, to a Jamaican mother and an unknown African-American Father. Campbell has referred to his parents' relationship as "a love affair between his mother and a handsome stranger". His mother abandoned Campbell after a breakdown at the age of one and he would not reunite with her until he was 13 years old. He was raised in the National Children's Home (now Action for Children) in Sutton Coldfield Birmingham. In his 20's, Campbell was a "club kid" on the scene in London, Paris and New York, and worked as a model.

He was the first member of his family to go to University, attending the University of Sussex and graduating with a bachelor's degree in intellectual history. In 2017, he was awarded an Honorary Doctorate by the University of Sussex for his work; it is the first Honorary Doctorate to be given to an openly Black Queer man in the UK.

Campbell has described himself as "acutely shy throughout [his] 20's and into [his] 30's", which caused him to learn to establish himself as "commanding decisive and clear" in "professional settings".

== Career ==
As an actor he has starred in Isaac Julien's Trussed, Campbell X's Stud Life, and Ian Poitier's Oh Happy Day. He is a former artistic director of The Red Room Theatre Company and past chair of the Independent Theatre Council UK. In 2000, he co-founded rukus! Federation, a Black LGBTQ Arts collective with the artist Ajamu X. In 2017, he was longlisted for the Spread the Word's inaugural Life Writing Prize for his forthcoming memoir Battyman. He is currently on the board of Marlborough Productions

=== Theatre ===
Campbell was selected for the prestigious Regional Theatre Young Directors Training Scheme at the age of 24. [[The Red Room Theatre Company|He was the first Black director to be awarded on the scheme.]]citation needed] He is a former artistic director of The Red Room Theatre Company and past chair of the Independent Theatre Council UK. The Red Room was an experimental theatre company dedicated to challenging the status quo through innovative work and collaborations. It was also a founder company of a series of performance research projects across Europe called the @worknetork that included theatre and performance companies from Sweden, Denmark, Germany, Greece and Portugal. As artistic director he created The Oikos Project, an artist led conversation about climate change and activism including play commissions, community engagement and a new installation. This also included a collaboration with the architect Martin Kaltwasser to create the UK's first fully functioning recycled theatre and installation art work, The Jellyfish Theatre. The Jellyfish Theatre was nominated for the AKA What's On Stage Theatre Event of the Year Award, 2011 and the Architects Journal Small Projects Award.

Other work includes Unstated, a multi-media installation and performance, the Poverty Project, and the Red Room Platforms, a series of interactive arts and politics interventions.

Film

Campbell's films have appeared in festivals worldwide. His first film, The Homecoming (1995) about the artist and photographer Ajamu X commissioned by Black Arts Video Project, is a meditation on Black masculinity and sexuality, themes Campbell has continued to explore throughout his work.^{:282}

==== Fetish (2018) ====
In 2018 Videojam and The Barbican commissioned Campbell to create work for them. The resulting piece, FETISH, was inspired by the works of Jean-Michel Basquiat. In it, Campbell walks naked through the streets of New York City. Describing his process, Campbell stated:

FETISH came about because I wanted to express more complex, nuanced and creative notions of my space in the world whilst also honouring the fallen. It's a film that I willed into being as a place for me to reflect on all the different masculinities and femininities inside of me and to offer a vision of humanity and humanness; amongst all the violence and degradation.

The work reflected the challenges of walking through the city, and generally navigating space as a Black person. He considered the work a dual journey, a protest on the streets of Manhattan, as well as an artistic journey for the audience viewing the film. It was created in collaboration with 2014 Mercury Music Prize winners Young Fathers.

Campbell moved into television directing in 2004 after completing the BBC Doctors Directing Course. He went on to direct episode of Doctors for two years. He then directed Eastenders between 2007 and 2010. Other directing credits include Una Marson Our Last Caribbean Voice for BBC and Moments that Shaped Black Queer Britain for BET/Paramount.

Artist

Campbell has pursued an art career alongside his directing work. He created The Book of Politics for Transform Festival in Leeds. His work in theatre has continually experimented with installation. site specific spaces and mixed media experiences. He was awarded the Prospect Cottage Residency in 2022 and invited to screen Fetish at the British School at Rome.

Tate Modern

In 2024, Campbell was invited by Tate Modern to create an installation for the Transformer Rooms. My Rukus! Heart is an exploration of sexuality, the Black Queer Body, memory and an archive of emotion’ there is humour, sex and the preservation of Black queer life.

=== rukus! Federation ===
In June 2000, Campbell and Ajamu X founded rukus! Federation, a Black Queer arts charity dedicated to presenting the best in work by Black Lesbian, Gay, Bisexual, Transgender and Queer (BLGBTQ) artists.^{:277} The name, which "is a derivative of the word 'raucous'" and also draws on the name "Rukus [ . . . ] a well-known African-American porn star" was chosen in order to "present [the artists'] politics more playfully".^{:277}

In 2005 the rukus! archive project was launched. Originally, they "wanted to call it the Black, Lesbian, and Gay Queer Archive" but the Charity Commission "objected to the word queer, because some people might find it offensive" and the name was changed. Housed at the London Metropolitan Archives, Campbell and Ajamu X founded the archive to:

collect, preserve, exhibit, and otherwise make available for the first time to the public historical, cultural, and artistic materials related to the Black lesbian, gay, bisexual, and transgender communities in the United Kingdom.

It is the UK's first and only archive dedicated to Black LGBTQ artists. In 2008 it received the London Metropolitan Archives' Archive Landmark Award. Projects related to the archive include the play Mangina Monologues.

In 2024 Topher curated “Making A rukus!” an exhibition for Somerset House. “Making A rukus!” told the story of the origins of rukus! Federation as an arts project culminating in the rukus! Archive

== Influences ==
Campbell has cited Derek Jarman, Isaac Julien and James Baldwin as important influences on his work.^{:282} He has also drawn on academic thinking "around Black mainstream identity politics around hybridity, and notions of difference and diversity, as defined by Black artists", for example, Sonia Boyce.

== Radio ==
- Talking Huck Finn (2001) – BBC Radio 4
- Facing Leicester Square (2002) BBC Radio 3

== Plays ==
- Blood Knot (Derby Playhouse) (1990)
- Woza Albert (1991)
- Necklaces (Talawa Theatre Company) (1992)
- Flamingo Theatre London (1992)
- Moor Masterpieces (West Yorkshire Playhouse) (1996)
- Wicked Games – (West Yorkshire Playhouse) (1996)
- Good Copy – (West Yorkshire Playhouse) (1996)
- Jar the Floor – (West Yorkshire Playhouse) (1997)
- Pantheaon of the Gods – (Young Vic Theatre) (2001)
- Dead Funny – (Nottingham Playhouse) (2001)
- Unstated (2008)
- Oikos (2010)
- Protozoa (2010)

== Filmography ==
=== As director ===
Title	Year	Notes
The Homecoming: A Short Film About Ajamu	1996	Also served as producer and writer
A Mulatto Song	1997	
Don't Call Me Battyman	2004	
In this Our Lives The Reunion	2008	Also served as producer, editor, and camera operator
Invisible	2012	For Channel 4
FETISH	2018	

=== As actor ===
Film	Year	Role	Director
Trussed	1996		Isaac Julien
Oh Happy Day	2006	Randy	Ian Poitier
Stud Life	2012		Campbell X
Peter de Rome: Grandfather of Gay Porn	2014	On-screen participant	

== As writer ==
- For Coloured Boys
- Black and Gay in the UK
- On Freedom: Powerful Polemics by Supporters of Belarus Free Theatre
- Brothas 2.0 part or Outlaws to Inlaws (Kings Head Theatre London)

== As executive producer ==
- Oikos, a Journey in Wood (2010)

== Awards ==
- Jerwood Directors Award (2005)
- London Metropolitan Archives Award (2008)
- Small Projects Award (2010)
- Nominated for the Urban Intervention Award 2010
- Nomination for the AKA Theatre Event of the Year Award
