= James Stephens (author) =

Irish novelist and poet (1880–1950)

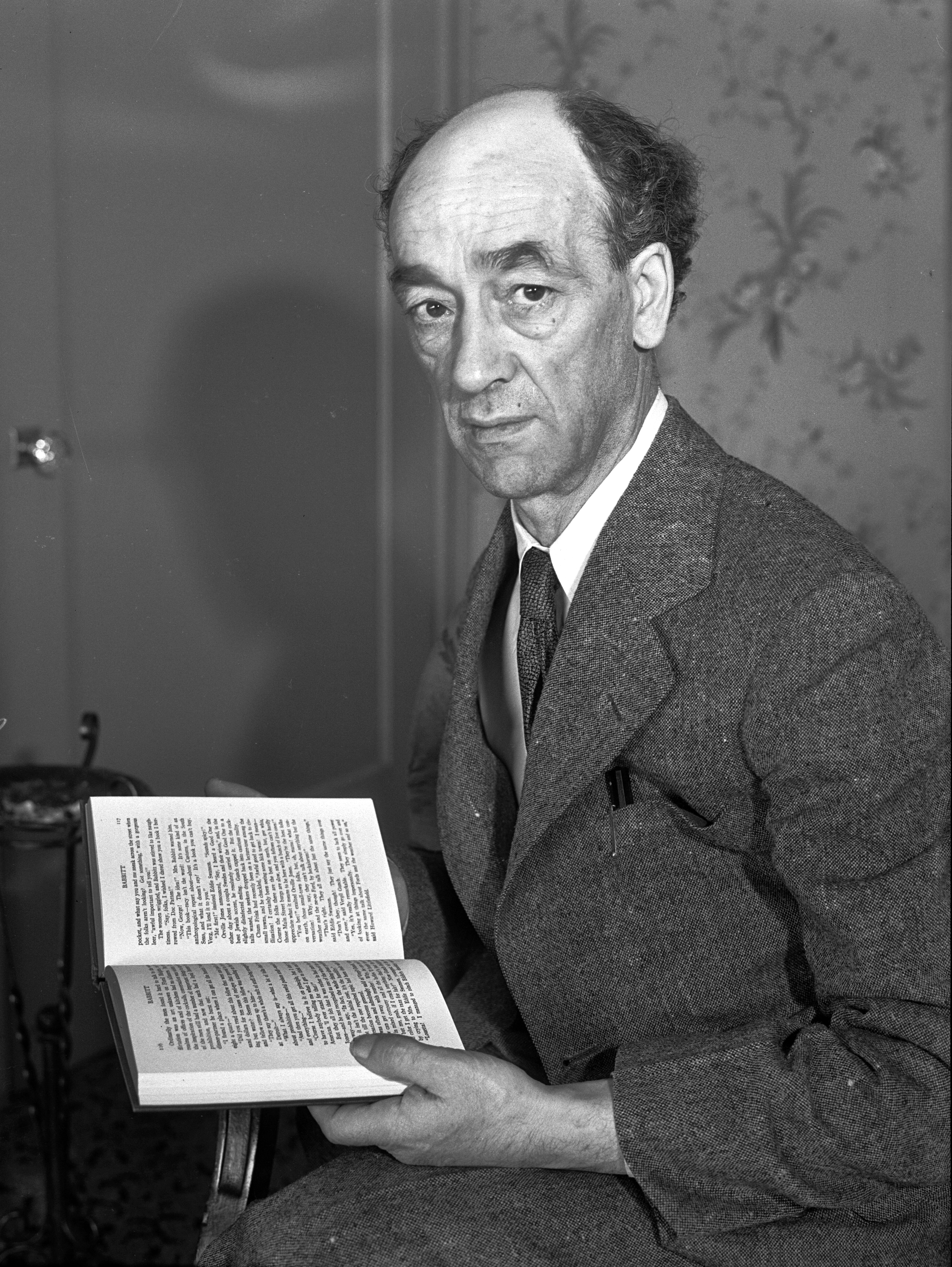
Stephens in 1935

James Stephens (9 February 1880 – 26 December 1950) was an Irish novelist and poet.

== Life ==
=== Early life ===
James Stephens's birth is somewhat shrouded in mystery. Stephens himself claimed to have been born on the same day and same year as James Joyce (2 February 1882), whereas he is in fact probably the same James Stephens who is on record as being born at the Rotunda Hospital, Dublin, on 9 February 1880, the son of Francis Stephens (c. 1840–1882/3) of 5 Thomas's Court, Dublin, a vanman and a messenger for a stationer's office, and his wife, Charlotte Collins (born c. 1847). His father died when Stephens was two years old, and when he was six years old, his mother remarried, and Stephens was committed to the Meath Protestant Industrial School for Boys in Blackrock for begging on the streets, where he spent much of the rest of his childhood. He attended school with his adoptive brothers Thomas and Richard (Tom and Dick) Collins before graduating as a solicitor's clerk. They competed and won several athletic competitions despite James's tiny stature (he stood 4 ft 10 in (1.47 m) in his socks). He was known affectionately as 'Tiny Tim'. He was much enthralled by the tales of military valour of his adoptive family and would have become a soldier except for his height.

=== Career and nationalism ===
By the early 1900s Stephens was increasingly inclined to socialism and the Irish language (he spoke and wrote Irish) and by 1912 was a dedicated Irish Republican. He was a close friend of the 1916 leader Thomas MacDonagh, who was then editor of the Irish Review and deputy headmaster in St Enda's, the radical bilingual Montessori school run by P. H. Pearse and later manager of the Irish Theatre. Stephens spent much time with MacDonagh in 1911. His growing nationalism brought a schism with his adoptive family, but probably won him his job as registrar in the National Gallery of Ireland, where he worked between 1915 and 1925, having previously had an ill-paid job with the Mecredy firm of solicitors.

=== Literary career ===
Stephens produced many retellings of Irish myths. His retellings are marked by a rare combination of humour and lyricism (Deirdre, (a legendary figure), and Irish Fairy Tales are often especially praised). He also wrote several original novels (The Crock of Gold, Demi-Gods) based loosely on Irish wonder tales. The Crock of Gold in particular has achieved enduring popularity and has often been reprinted.

Stephens began his career as a poet under the tutelage of poet and painter Æ (George William Russell). Stephens's first book of poems, Insurrections, was published in 1909. His last book, Kings and the Moon (1938), was also a volume of verse.

Stephens's influential account of the 1916 Easter Rising, Insurrection in Dublin, describes the effect of the deaths by execution of his friend Thomas MacDonagh and others as being "like watching blood oozing from under a door". Of MacDonagh he wrote:

No person living is the worse off for having known Thomas MacDonagh, and I, at least, have never heard MacDonagh speak unkindly or even harshly of anything that lived. It has been said of him that his lyrics were epical; in a measure it is true, and it is true in the same measure that his death was epical. He was the first of the leaders who was tried and shot.

==== James Joyce ====
Stephens later lived between Paris, London and Dublin. During the 1930s he was a friend of James Joyce, and they wrongly believed that they shared a birthday. Joyce, who was concerned about his ability to finish what later became Finnegans Wake, proposed that Stephens assist him, with the authorship credited to JJ & S (for "Jameses Joyce & Stephens", but also a pun on the popular Jameson Irish whiskey, made by John Jameson & Sons). The plan was never implemented, as Joyce was able to complete the work on his own.

=== Late life ===
During the last decade of his life Stephens found a new audience through a series of broadcasts on the BBC.

== Timeline ==
- 1880 (9 February) Possible date of birth of James Stephens in Dublin.
- 1882 (2 February) Date of birth used by Stephens.
- 1886–96 Attended Meath Protestant Industrial School for Boys.
- 1896 Employed as a clerk by a Dublin solicitor, a Mr Wallace.
- 1901 Member of a gymnastic team that won the Irish Shield. Employed by Reddington & Sainsbury, solicitors.
- 1906 Employed as a clerk-typist in the office of TT Mecredy & Son, solicitors.
- 1907 Began making regular contributions to Sinn Féin magazine. Birth of stepdaughter, Iris, on 14 June; soon afterwards he announced that he had a wife, Cynthia (Millicent Josephine Gardiner Kavanagh, 22 May 1882 – 18 December 1960). Discovered by George W Russell (Æ).
- 1909 Published poetry collection Insurrections. Acted in the Theatre of Ireland's two productions of Seumas O'Kelly's play The Shuiler's Child. Birth of son James Naoise on 26 October.
- 1910 Acted in the Theatre of Ireland's production of Gerald Macnamara's The Spurious Sovereign. Became associated with David Houston, Thomas MacDonagh and Padraic Colum in founding The Irish Review (published from March 1911 to November 1914).
- 1911 Acted in Pádraic Ó Conaire's Bairbre Ruadh; his own play The Marriage of Julia Elizabeth produced by the Theatre of Ireland.
- 1912 Published novels The Charwoman's Daughter (first published as a serial in The Irish Review during Thomas MacDonagh's editorship) and The Crock of Gold and poetry collection The Hill of Vision.
- 1913 Published Here Are Ladies and Five New Poems; received a commission from The Nation (London) to write a series of short stories; moved to Paris; another production of The Marriage of Julia Elizabeth at the Hardwicke Street Theatre; The Crock of Gold awarded the Polignac Prize.
- 1914 Published The Demi-Gods.
- 1915 Published Songs from the Clay and The Adventures of Seumas Beg/The Rocky Road to Dublin; elected Unestablished Registrar of the National Gallery of Ireland.
- 1916 Published Green Branches and The Insurrection in Dublin.
- 1918–24 Registrar of the National Gallery of Ireland.
- 1918 Published Reincarnations.
- 1919 Married Cynthia (by now a widow) in London on 14 May.
- 1920 Published Irish Fairy Tales, retelling stories from the Fiannaíocht; his play The Wooing of Julia Elizabeth (identical to The Marriage of Julia Elizabeth) produced at the Abbey Theatre by the Dublin Drama League; underwent one of a series of operations for gastric ulcers.
- 1922 Published Arthur Griffith: Journalist and Statesman.
- 1923 Published Deirdre.
- 1924 Published Little Things and In the Land of Youth; Deirdre received the medal for fiction at the Aonach Tailteann festival; resigned from the National Gallery.
- 1925 Published A Poetry Recital, Danny Murphy and Christmas in Freelands; went on two lecture tours in the United States; settled in Kingsbury, a suburb of London.
- 1926 Published Collected Poems.
- 1927 Made friends with James Joyce.
- 1928 Published Etched in Moonlight and On Prose and Verse; made first BBC broadcast; lectured at the Third International Book Fair in Florence.
- 1929 Published Julia Elizabeth: A Comedy, in One Act, The Optimist and The Outcast (the latter one of Faber's Ariel pamphlets, illustrated by Althea Willoughby); Joyce suggested that Stephens complete Finnegans Wake if Joyce was unable to do so; visited Romania and met Queen Marie; made the first of several visits to WTH Howe in the United States.
- 1930 Published Theme and Variations.
- 1931 Published How St Patrick Saves the Irish, Stars Do Not Make a Noise and Strict Joy.
- 1937 Began regular series of BBC broadcasts; accidental death of his son James Naoise on 24 December.
- 1938 Published Kings and the Moon.
- 1940 Moved to Woodside Chapel in Gloucestershire.
- 1942 Awarded a British Civil List Pension.
- 1945 Returned to London.
- 1947 Awarded honorary DLitt by Trinity College, Dublin.
- 1950 Made final BBC broadcast; died at Eversleigh on St Stephen's Day.
