= Miller's Ferry Normal and Industrial School =

School in Wilcox County, Alabama, U.S. (1884–?)

Coordinates: 32.0996°N 87.3674°W

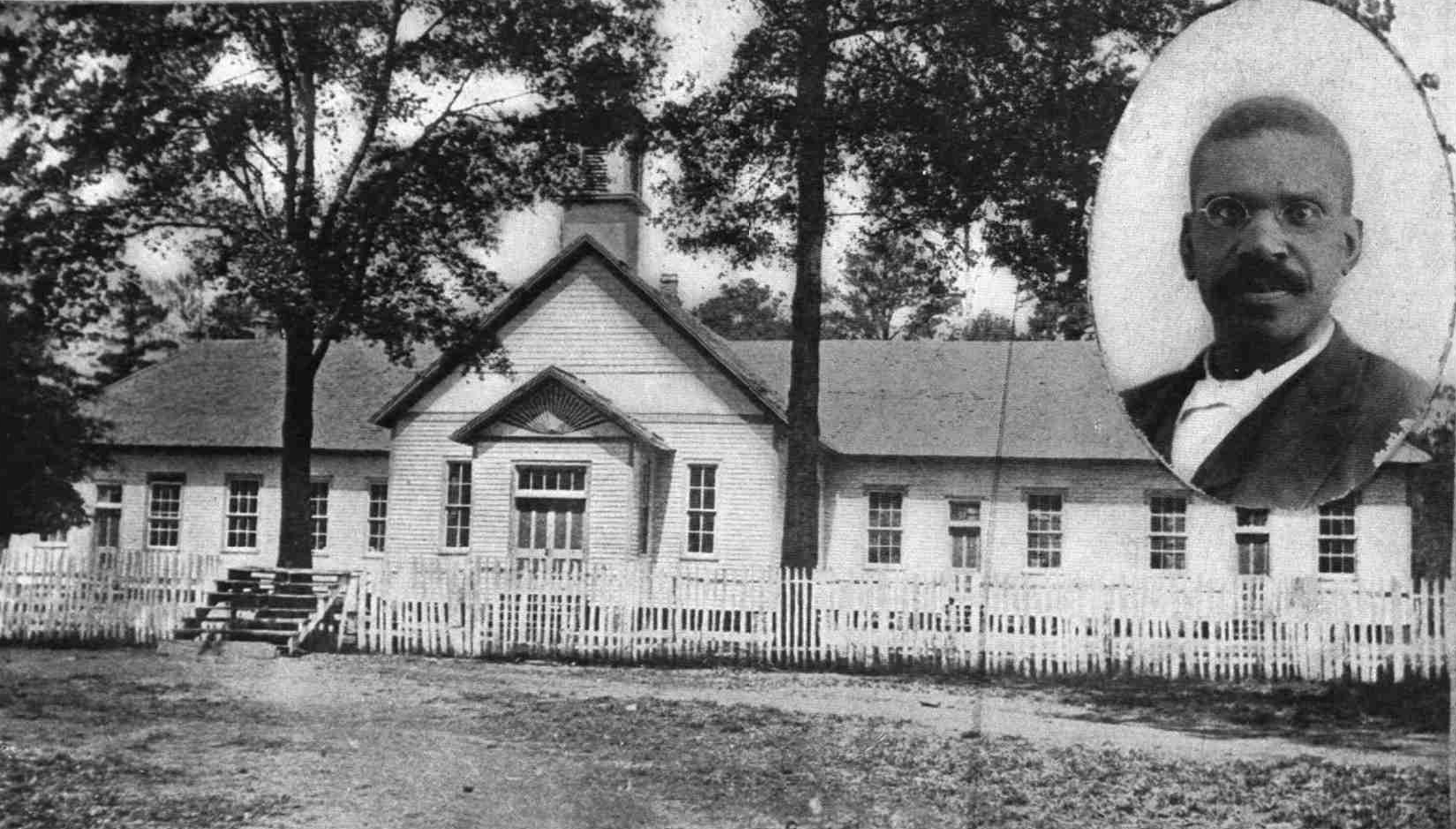
- Miller's Ferry Normal and Industrial School main building (c. 1910) with principal C.H. Johnson
- Miller's Ferry, Wilcox County, Alabama, U.S.

Information
- School type: Private boarding school, normal school, industrial school
- Religious affiliation: Northern Presbyterian Church
- Established: 1884
- Affiliation: Presbyterian Board of Missions for Freedmen

Miller's Ferry Normal and Industrial School was a private segregated boarding school for African American students established in 1884 in Miller's Ferry, Alabama, U.S. The school was founded by the Northern Presbyterian Church, and had an on-campus training hospital for student nurses.

== History ==
The school was funded by the Presbyterian Board of Missions for Freedmen, and supported by the Northern Presbyterian Church. In 1908, the school had 303 enrolled students and 14 teachers. Many of the teachers were from Knoxville College. The Miller's Ferry Normal and Industrial School taught programs in music, nursing, domestic science, sewing and dressmaking, carpentry, blacksmithing, printmaking, and the study of laundry. In 1914, the campus had one main building, four dormitories for students (separated by gender), teacher housing, a laundry building, a printshop, a blacksmith shop, a carpenter shop, a sewing building, and a training hospital. C.H. Johnson served as principal in 1910. Isaiah Hamilton Bonner, a former student of the school, served as principal in 1917.

The Alabama Department of Archives and History hold photographs and records of the school in their library archives.

== See also ==
- Camden Academy
