= Mabel Walker (athlete) =

American sprinter (1928–2023)

Personal information
- Nationality: American
- Born: December 11, 1928 Camden, Alabama, U.S.
- Died: September 10, 2023 (aged 94) Forsyth, Georgia, U.S.

Sport
- Sport: Sprinting
- Event: 100 metres

Mabel Walker Thornton (December 11, 1928 – September 10, 2023) was an American sprinter. She competed in the women's 100 metres at the 1948 Summer Olympics.

== Biography ==
Mabel Thornton was born in Camden, in Wilcox County, Alabama, and attended Camden Academy, where she first ran track. She then joined the track team at Tuskegee University, and qualified for the 1948 Olympics after an AAU track meet.

Mabel Walker died in Forsyth, Georgia on September 10, 2023, at the age of 94.
