= Mayers' Industrial School =

School in Knoxville, Tennessee, US

Mayers’ Industrial School

Location
- 606 Payne Street, Knoxville, Tennessee; United States; 35.9677°N 83.9123°W

Information
- Other names: Mayers Industrial School, Myers' Industrial School, Mayers’ Industrial High School
- Former name: People's Industrial School
- School type: Black private
- Religious affiliations: Presbyterian Board of Missions, Presbyterian Freemen's Board
- Denomination: Presbyterian
- Established: 1904
- Closed: c. 1930
- Principal: Flora E. Mayers

Mayers' Industrial School (1904–c. 1930) was a private boarding and day school for African American students in Knoxville, Tennessee, U.S. The school was in part funded by the Presbyterian Board of Missions. It was also known as People's Industrial School, Mayers’ Industrial High School, and Myers' Industrial School.

== History ==
The school was founded as the People's Industrial School in 1904, by the principal Flora E. Mayers (?–1930), and was owned the Presbyterian Board of Missions. Mayers had studied at a "colored school" in Maryville, and at Swift Memorial College in Rogersville. She was married to Rev. Richard Mayers.

The early classes for Mayers' Industrial School were held at a building at 923 Vine Avenue at Lynch Street in East Knoxville, and school events were held at Market Hall. It offered programs in bible study, sewing, woodworking, and cooking. In 1908, the school name changed to Mayers' Industrial School by the women at the Union Presbyterian Society. Their student work was displayed in the "Negro Building" at the Appalachian Exposition in 1911.

In August 1911, the school secured a building at 606 Payne Street in Knoxville, which had formerly housed the Slater Training School. The school was able to raise the funds to purchase the building by fundraising and with help from the Presbyterian Freemen's Board, and Knoxville-local Charles Cramer. The campus contained dorms for boarding, as well as operated as a day school. When the Shiloh Presbyterian Church suffered from a fire in 1912, the African American church temporarily used the chapel at Mayers' Industrial School for worship.

== Legacy ==
Multiple photographs of the school are included a collection at the Knox County Public Library.

== See also ==
- Knoxville College
- List of industrial schools
