= Millers Ferry, Alabama =

Unincorporated community in Alabama, United States

- Unincorporated community
- Location within the state of Alabama Millers Ferry, Alabama (the United States)
- Coordinates: 32°5′58.52″N 87°22′2.98″W
- Country: United States
- State: Alabama
- County: Wilcox
- Elevation: 131 ft (40 m)
- Time zone: UTC-6 (Central (CST))
  - Summer (DST): UTC-5 (CDT)
- Area code: 334

Millers Ferry is an unincorporated community in Wilcox County, Alabama, United States. The Millers Ferry Lock and Dam is located near the community on the Alabama River.

== History ==
Miller's Ferry Normal and Industrial School was founded in 1884 in Millers Ferry and served as a private boarding school for African American students.

=== 2007 tornado ===
On March 1, 2007, Millers Ferry was struck by a violent EF4 tornado. One person was killed, two others were injured, and over 70 houses were damaged or destroyed. The tornado caused well over $2 million in damage.

== Gallery ==
Below are photographs taken in Millers Ferry as part of the Historic American Buildings Survey:

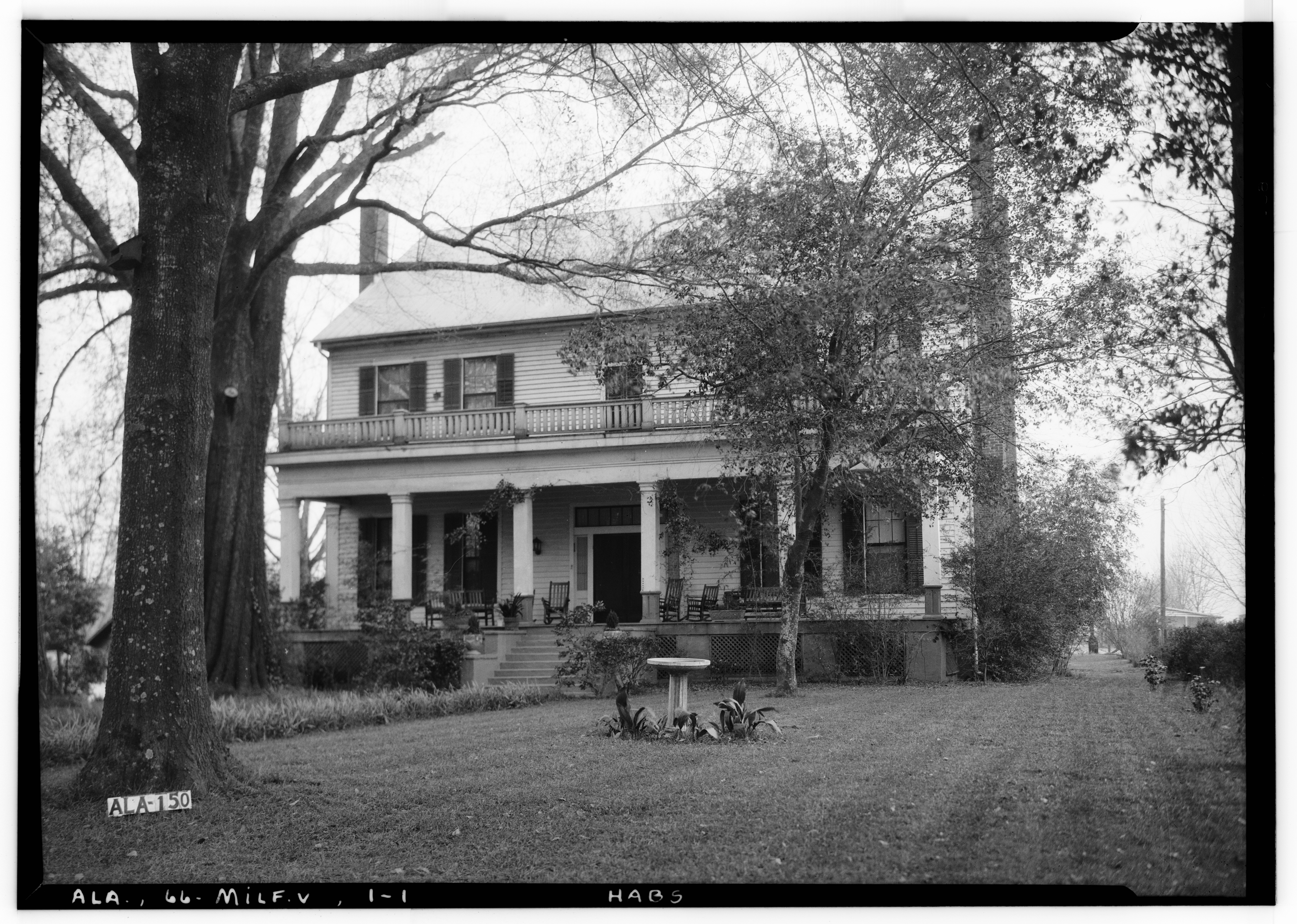
Rosemary House and Plantation

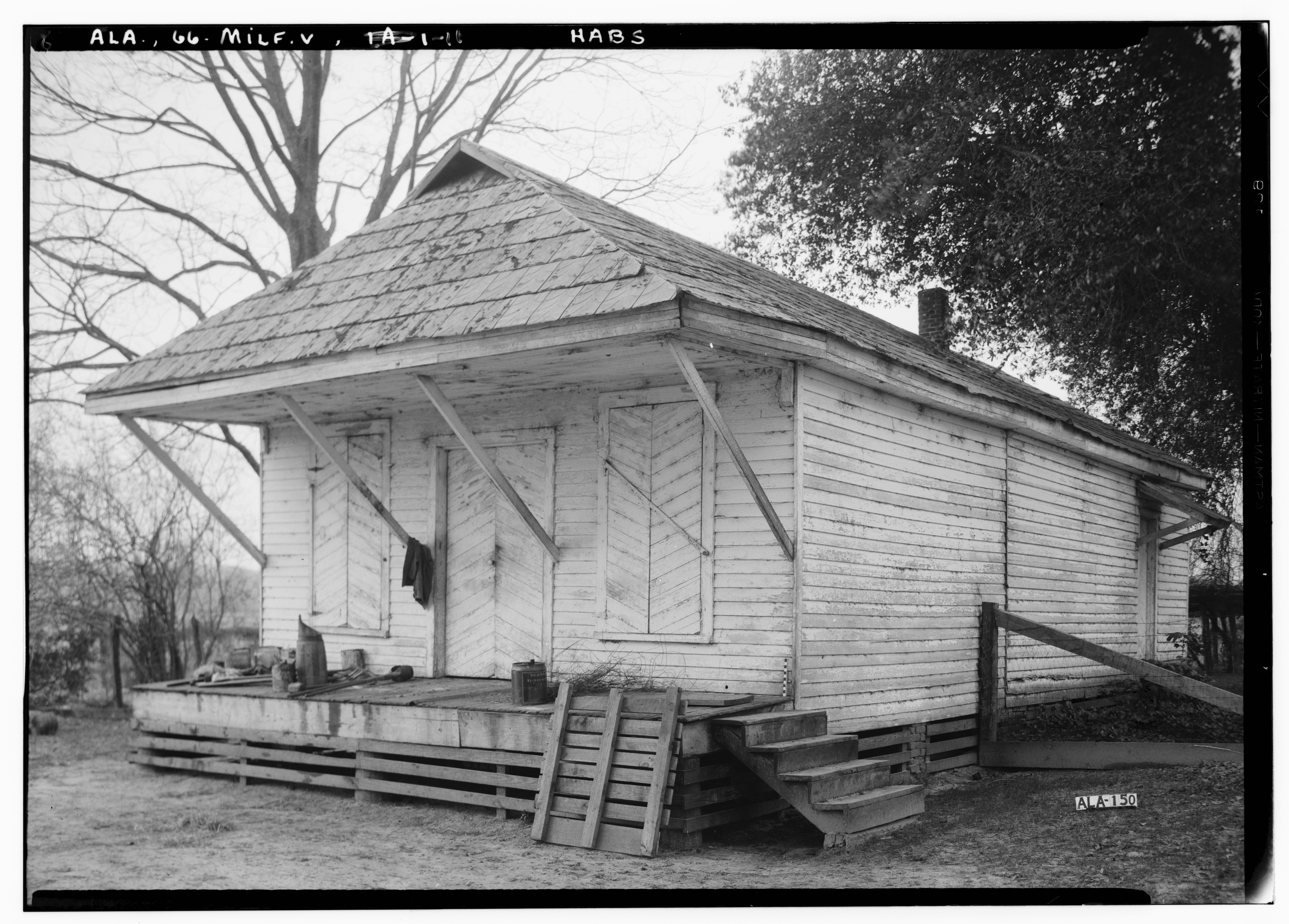
Old store, Rosemary House and Plantation

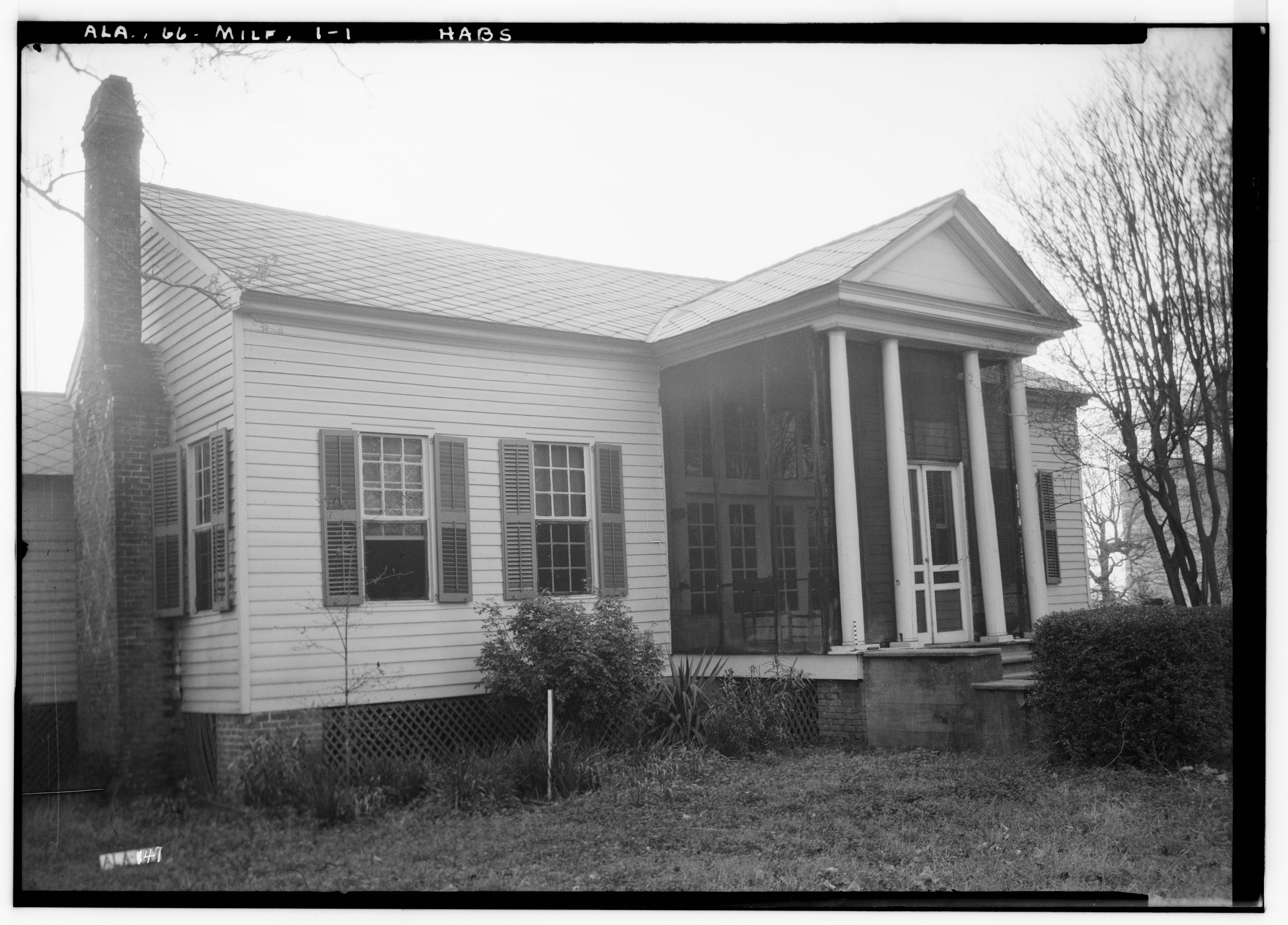
Sellers-Henderson House
