= Camden Academy =

School in Wilcox County, Alabama, US

- Interactive map of Camden Academy
- 31.994782°N 87.282869°W
- Location: 30 Claiborne Street, Camden, Wilcox County, Alabama, U.S.

History
- Dates active: 1895; 131 years ago – 1970; 56 years ago

Alabama Register of Landmarks and Heritage
- Designated: June 27, 2019

Camden Academy (1895–1970) was a private school for African Americans in Camden, Alabama, the county seat of Wilcox County, Alabama. It served elementary school students, secondary school students, and boarders.

The school was founded in 1895 by the Board of Freedmen's Missions, an organization of the United Presbyterian Church of North America. The US Department of Education reported on the school in 1917, following visits to the school in 1913 and 1915. At that time, there were 215 elementary school students and 18 secondary school students; 30 of these students were boarders. W. G. Wilson was the principal. There were 9 teachers, "all colored". Bulldogs were the mascot. It was “consolidated” with Wilcox Central in 1970.

A photograph of students preparing for commencement exercises was taken in 1951.

Wilcox Academy was established in the community after integration as a school for white students (segregation academy). Wilcox Central High School is the county’s public high school and has a student body that is mostly African American.

Maria Gitin wrote about civil rights protesters from the school who were assaulted.

== Notable alumni ==
- Mabel Walker Thornton, Olympian track runner

== See also ==
- Miller's Ferry Normal and Industrial School
