= London Archives =

Public research centre in London

The London Archives
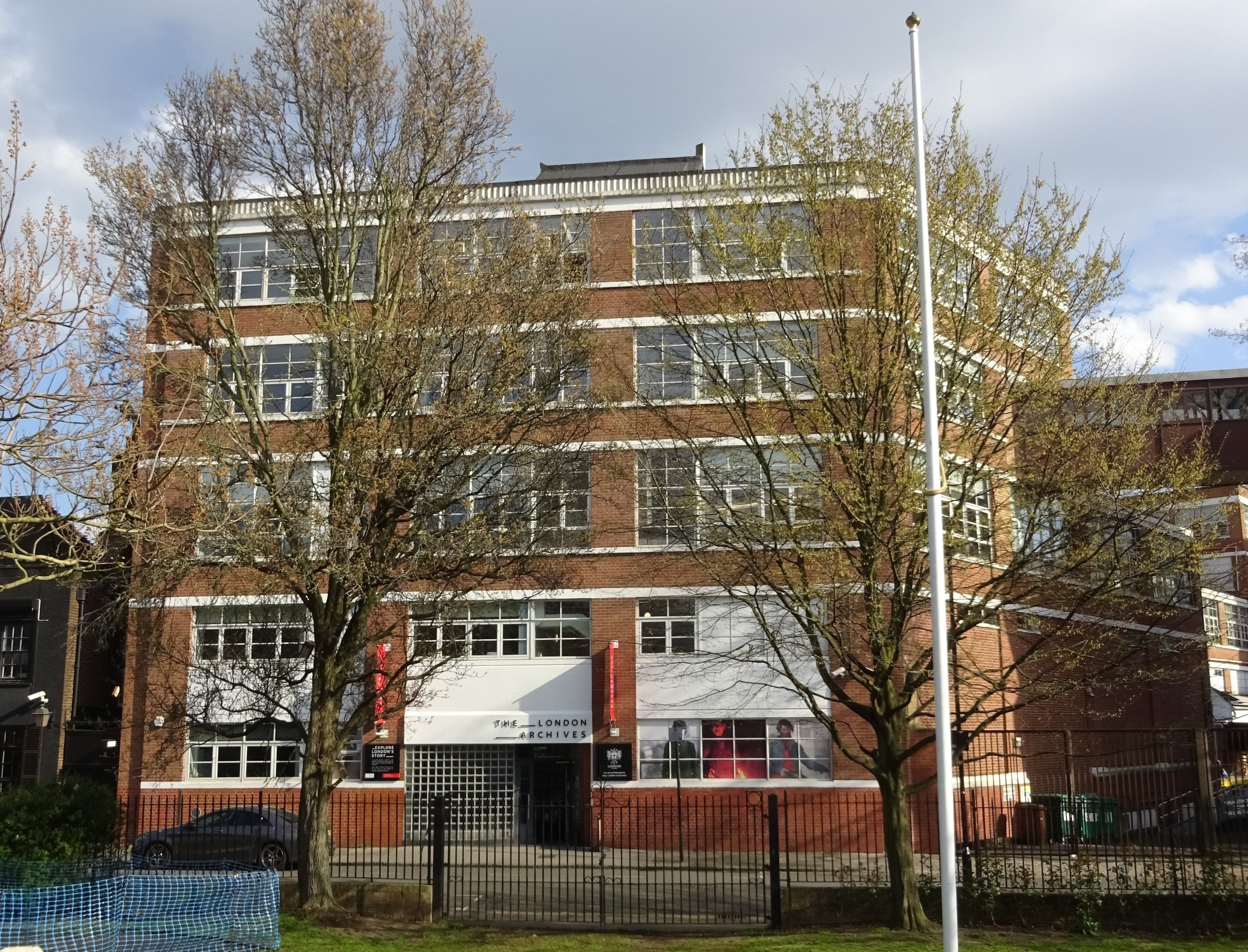
- The London Archives: main building and entrance
- Interactive map of The London Archives
- 51.5252°N 0.1073°W
- Location: London, England
- Established: 1997
- Director: Emma Markiewicz
- Website: www.thelondonarchives.org

The London Archives, previously known as the Greater London Record Office (1965–1997) and London Metropolitan Archives (1997–2024) is the principal local government archive repository for the Greater London area, including the City of London. It is administered and financed by the City of London Corporation, and is the largest county record office in the United Kingdom.

The archive is based at 40 Northampton Road, Clerkenwell, London. It attracts more than 30,000 visitors a year and deals with a similar number of written enquiries. The holdings amount to more than 72 miles (116 km) of records of local, regional and national importance. With the earliest record dating from 1067, the archive charts the development of the capital into a modern-day major world city.

== History ==
The London Archives is an amalgamation of several separate bodies. The London County Record Office, the London County Council Members Library, and the Middlesex County Record Office merged in 1965 to form the Greater London Record Office and History Library (GLRO). The GLRO was rebranded as the London Metropolitan Archives in 1997, and took over the former Corporation of London Record Office in 2005 and the former Guildhall Library Manuscripts and Prints and Maps sections in 2009. It was rebranded again, becoming The London Archives in August 2024.

=== London County Record Office ===
Until 1889, London was still the area within the walled city; to the south of the river was Surrey and Kent and to the north of the city's limits was Middlesex. These areas, however, had become densely populated and, given the sphere of influence of the city, traditional boundaries were no longer practical. The County of London was created and controlled by the newly formed London County Council, which took over many of the duties of its predecessor the Metropolitan Board of Works. It was the records of these bodies and similar groups such as the London School Board and Metropolitan Asylums Board that would form the nucleus of the London County Record offices holdings, which were based at County Hall on the south bank of the River Thames.

As well as the official records that the council generated, they also began to accept deposits of records fundamental to London's history, such as copies of memorials from the Middlesex Deeds Register, diocesan and parish records and records of charities such as the Foundling Hospital. Under the Public Records Act 1958, the record office became recognised as a place of deposit for public records relating to the London area, including hospitals and courts.

Since the creation of the London County Council, there had been a record keeper in the Clerks Department who held custody of the documents. By the 1930s they had established individual departmental record rooms staffed by record assistants working under the general supervision of the Record Keeper. Finally, in 1953 the position of Head Archivist and Librarian was created.

=== London County Council Members Library ===
The library was originally that of the members of the London County Council and reflected their interests. Situated in the same building as the London County Record Office, the library was added to with books on the history and topography of London. The library also included a rich collection of maps, prints, drawings and photographs.

=== Middlesex County Record Office ===
No single act or resolution marked the beginning of the Middlesex County Record Office. Like most other county record offices it developed naturally from the duty of the Clerk of the Peace to preserve certain records from the Quarter Sessions, together with other records such as enclosure awards and plans of public utilities. The first significant period in the formation of the county record office was in the early 1880s when a special committee was appointed by the justices of the peace to consider and report on the accommodation provided for the storage of the "old records" of the county. On behalf of the committee, John Cordy Jeaffreson, an inspector of the Historical Manuscripts Commission, sorted the records covering 1549–1820 into 87 classes comprising more than 10,000 volumes and nearly 5,000 rolls. The more modern records from post-1820 were given a separate room.

The formation of the London County Council in 1889 had seen the County of Middlesex much reduced in size. In 1893 when the Middlesex sessions papers were to be moved from the sessions house in Clerkenwell (an area that was previously Middlesex but now London) an argument broke out between the two county councils as to who should have responsibility for the material. This protracted dispute lasted some five years, with a high court judge eventually deciding in favour of Middlesex.

Around the same time, a Middlesex County Council act empowered the council to spend money preserving, arranging, indexing, classifying and publishing such records of the county that may be in the public interest. In 1913 the new Middlesex Guildhall at Westminster opened and was equipped with specially constructed muniment rooms, with an assistant to arrange and supervise their transfer from temporary storage. It was not until 1923 that a full-time graduate assistant was placed in charge of dealing with things such as document repair, storage issues, written enquiries, production of documents for public researchers and receipt of any gifts or deposits.

After the Second World War, the work of the county record office expanded steadily, with the appointment of a County Archivist, first in a part-time capacity (Colonel William Le Hardy), then full-time from 1957. By then, the archive had also moved to new premises at 1 Queen Anne's Gate Buildings, Dartmouth Street. In 1960 the record office was appointed an official place of deposit for public records by the Lord Chancellor under section 4 (1) of the Public Records Act 1958. After this, the archive increased its holdings, with significant deposits of petty sessions, coroners, Boards of Guardians and other official material. By this time, the record office had acquired an extensive reference library on the topography of Middlesex, as well as a great number of maps, prints and photographs.

=== Greater London Record Office ===
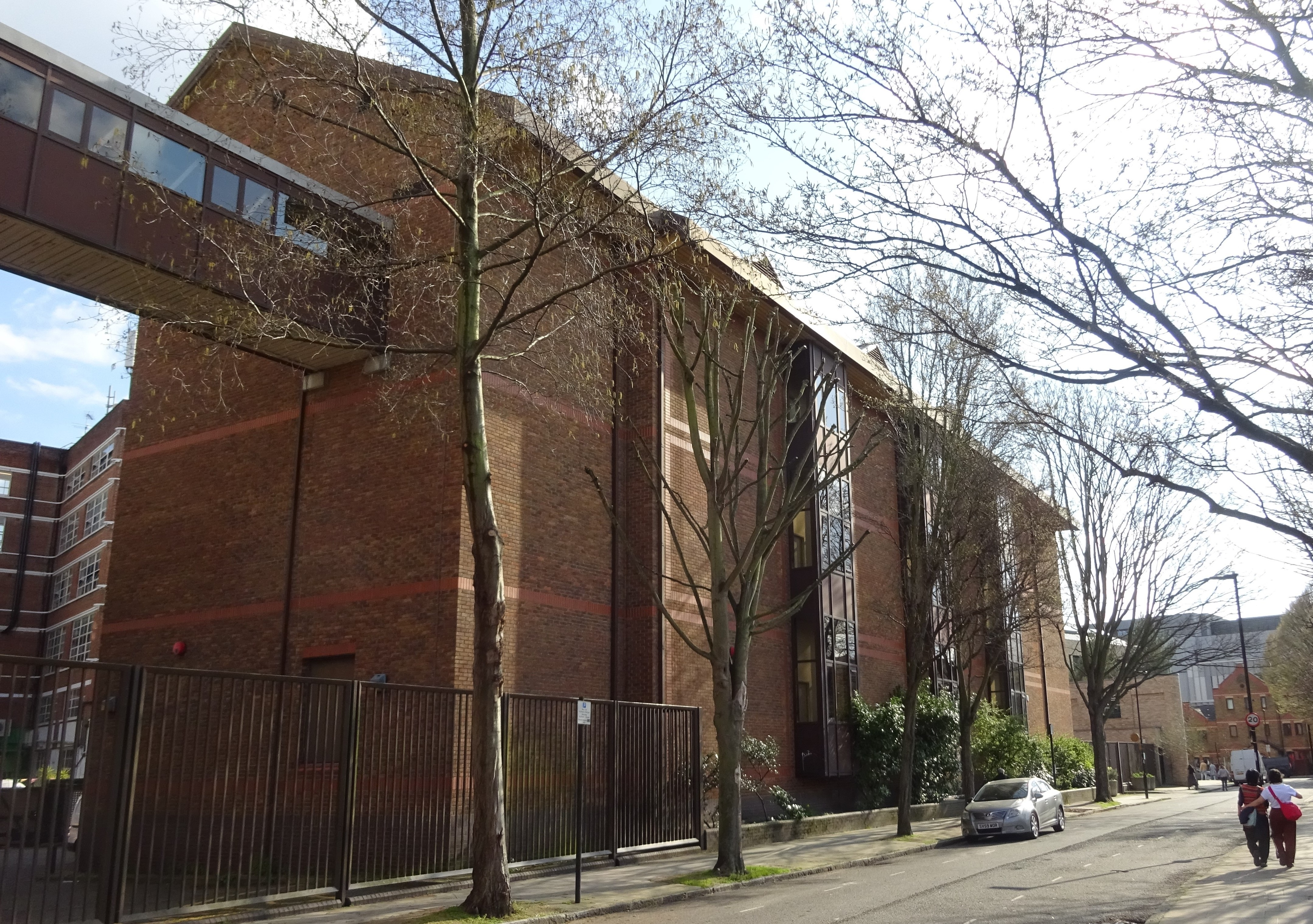
1990s repository block

Under the Local London Government Act 1963, which came into effect on 1 April 1965, the administrative counties of London and Middlesex together with their respective county councils were abolished. They were replaced by the Greater London Council (GLC) which administered a much wider area known as Greater London. The formation of Greater London also meant that some areas that had been previously part of Kent, Surrey, Essex and Hertfordshire, were also now included. However, to minimise confusion, it was agreed that records from these areas should remain within their ancient county.

The Greater London Council took over responsibility for the established record offices of the counties of London and Middlesex, as well as the former member's library of the London County Council. Together, these became the Greater London Record Office (GLRO) and Library. Although administratively united, the new archive continued to exist at two separate sites, with Middlesex material still held at Dartmouth Street and London material at County Hall (the record office being approximately where the London Aquarium is now situated). The two archives finally came together in 1979, when the Dartmouth Street site was sold by the GLC, and both archives were housed at County Hall.

In 1982, the GLRO moved to adapted premises at 40 Northampton Road, Clerkenwell. This site was a former print works, home to the Temple Press. The Press had moved from nearby Rosebery Avenue in August 1939, and continued to use the site until the end of the 1960s.

The Greater London Council was abolished in 1986, and since that date the archives have been administered by the City of London Corporation. In 1992 work was completed on a new repository block adjacent to the site in Northampton Road. This extension conformed to archival storage standards, with mobile shelving and environmental controls.

=== London Metropolitan Archives ===
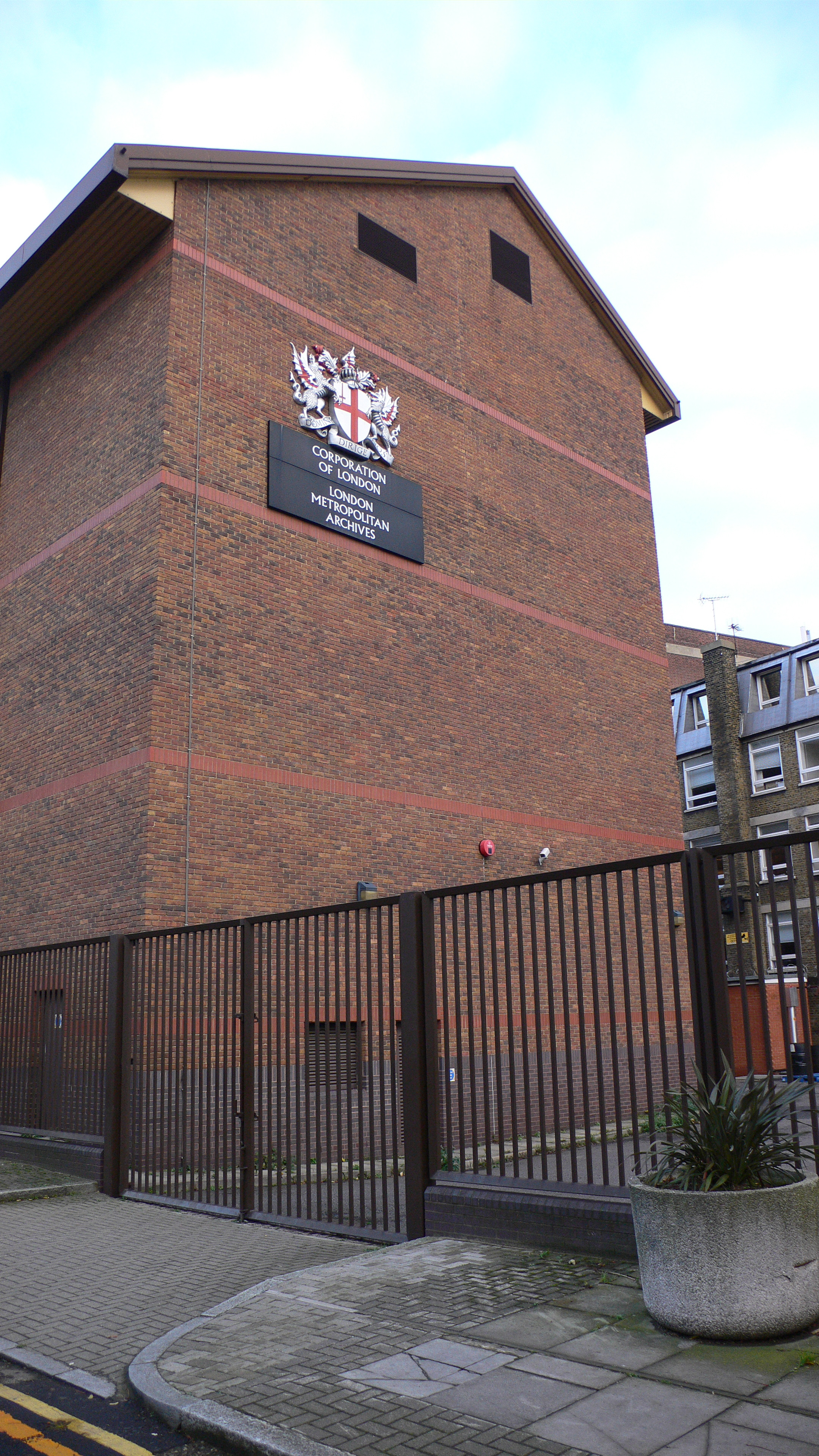
End of repository block, displaying the City of London coat of arms

The GLRO was renamed London Metropolitan Archives in 1997.

In 2005, the archives of the Corporation of London Records Office were moved to the London Metropolitan Archives to allow for a vast refurbishment programme at Guildhall. The City of London Corporation is the local government authority for the City of London, the area often referred to as the Square Mile and its records office held archives created by the Corporation and the organisations with which it was involved or helped to run. These archives include the earliest material currently held at The London Archives, dating from 1067. The archive contains the official records of how the City was governed and developed, through bodies such as the Court of Aldermen and Court of Common Council and many other official departments like the Chamberlains (which is the main financial department of the City Corporation and also deals with people being given the freedom of the city). It also contains a large number of records of organisations which the City of London Corporation are responsible for such as the City of London Police, a number of courts, open spaces and many of the major London markets.

In 2008, work began on a merger between London Metropolitan Archives and Guildhall Library’s Manuscripts Section and Prints and Maps Section. The Manuscripts Section held deposited records from organisations and institutions within the City of London, including 75 London Livery Companies, schools, parishes, wards (local government units within the City) and of course many large and small businesses which had their home within the Square Mile, from tiny family businesses to major multi-national banking and insurance firms. The Prints and Maps Section of Guildhall Library held collections which complemented the collections already held by London Metropolitan Archives and added much valuable content relating to the City itself. By 2009 the three record offices run by the City of London – London Metropolitan Archives, the Corporation of London Records Office and the Guildhall Library Manuscripts Section – had become one.

=== The London Archives ===
In July 2024, it was announced that the archives would be renamed as "The London Archives" from 5 August.

== Collections ==
The records held at The London Archives have been arranged in 28 major classes, of which a number are detailed below. Not all items are available for consultation. Items from uncatalogued collections can be made available only by prior appointment made at least seven days in advance of the intended visit. Some material is restricted or closed under Data Protection legislation because it contains sensitive or personal information relating to living individuals; some records may require written permission from the depositor before they can be viewed; some may be too fragile to be handled.

=== Associations ===
The London Archives holds records of many associations all with very different purposes. A large number of records are associations with political purposes such as the London Labour Party, London Liberal Party as well as regional branches of the Labour Party and Conservative Party. The records of associations also include a number of trade unions including the National Union of Teachers London and Middlesex branches, the Transport Salaried Staff Association and the Union of Post office Workers. Within the field of education there are records of The National Education Association and the London Head Teachers Association.

Records of pressure groups and campaigning organisations such as the National United Temperance Council and the Royal Society for Checking the Abuses of Public Advertising are also held. One of the larger series of records held are those belonging to the Public Morality Council. Formed in 1899 to combat vice and indecency in London, its members included representatives of all the major religions as well as leaders in education and medicine. The council continued until 1969 concentrating latterly on opposition to sexual immorality and pornography particularly with regards to theatre, cinema, radio and television.

A number of the records relate to groups promoting the arts, sport and recreation. Of particular note are the records of the Royal Society of Portrait Painters, though consultation of these archives, are subject to obtaining written permission. Other records include the Artists League of Great Britain, and The Royal Choral Society. On a more sporting theme, there are records of the London Schools Football Association, the National Amateur Rowing Association and the Ramblers Association.

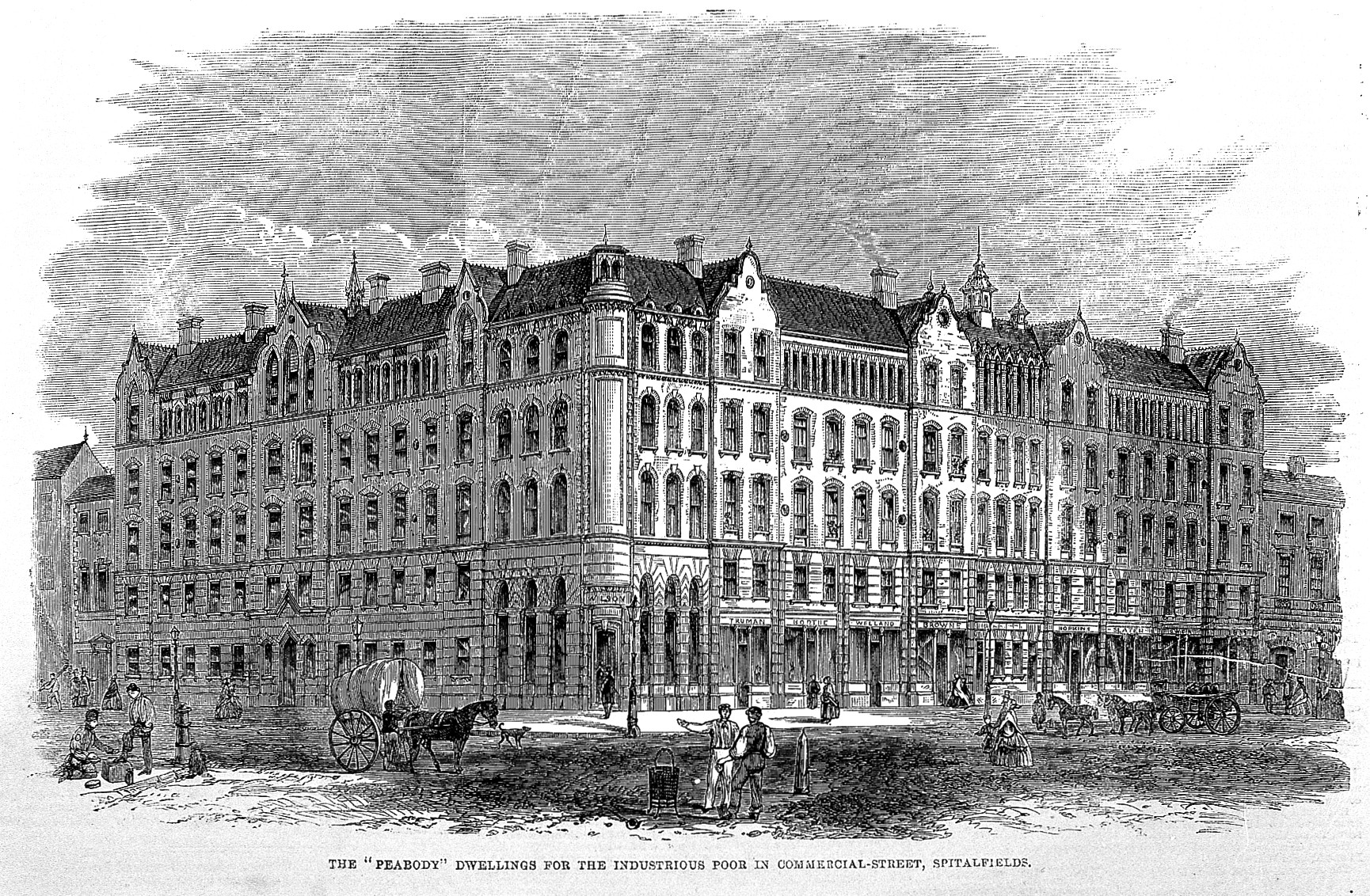
The first block of Peabody dwellings in Commercial Street, Spitalfields: a wood-engraving published in 1863, shortly before the building opened

The Associations series includes the archives of the Peabody Trust. The trust has its origins in a donation of £500,000 made by the American philanthropist, George Peabody, for the benefit of the people of London, the city where he had spent most of his adult life. The donation was put into the hands of trustees who were to ensure that it was used to "ameliorate the condition of the poor" of London. It was agreed that cheap, clean housing would best fulfil the intention of the gift, and that the Trust would provide an alternative to the Model Dwellings Companies who operated on a private, less philanthropic basis. The first housing block was opened in Spitalfields in 1864 and consisted of 57 dwellings and nine shops. Further block estates were built in Southwark, Lambeth, Westminster, Chelsea, Islington and Tower Hamlets. The collection includes registers of tenants, photographs, plans and administrative and financial records.

=== Businesses ===
The London Archives holds many archives from businesses that operated in the London and Middlesex areas. These are arranged alphabetically by the name of the company. One of the major collections in the series is that of the predecessors of London Transport. These include a number of railway companies, particularly the Metropolitan Railway and many of the London Omnibus Companies, as well as the records of the London Passenger Transport Board, which unified services in the London area for the first time and ran from 1933 to 1948.

Another important collection is the archives of Thames Water predecessors. The archive comprises the records of major institutions that supplied water to the metropolis between 1582 and 1974. Up to 1902 the work was largely carried out by private companies operating under increasing public control as time went on. The records of each company have been catalogued separately except in cases where takeover occurred. The companies include London Bridge Waterworks Company and the New River Company. In 1902 all the smaller private institutions were taken over by the Metropolitan Water Board, which assumed supply responsibilities for an area covering 576 square miles (1,490 km^{2}). The surviving records include corporate material such as board minutes and legal papers, accounts, staff records, engineering and technical files, plans, photos and property records.

J. Lyons and Co. was founded in 1886 as a catering business for exhibitions in Newcastle upon Tyne, Glasgow, Paris and London. By 1894 it had become a public company and it rapidly established a chain of teashops, corner houses and restaurants. This is one of the most intriguing business collections deposited, for as well as all the usual corporate records such as management, finance and administration, the collection is particularly strong in what may be termed ephemera. There are hundreds of photographs starting from as early 1887, a few films and videos, a large collection of press cuttings, advertisements, menus, lithographs and a Nippy's uniform.

Brewers have supplied the metropolis with beer for at least five centuries and by 1700 around 200 common brewers existed. As the industry evolved through acquisitions and competitive means, a hierarchy developed. By 1830 a few large companies dominated, supported by a base of smaller concerns. Several London brewers joined the ranks of England's greatest industrial enterprises and The London Archives holds archives of six of those major companies. These include Truman, Hanbury, Buxton & Co Ltd, Courage, Barclay & Simonds Ltd, Watney, Combe, Reid, Ltd, latterly Watney Mann Ltd, and Whitbread & Co Ltd. The surviving records include administrative and financial records, staff records, property records photographs and ephemera.

The collections from Guildhall Library's Manuscripts Section have added major financial businesses to the archive's holdings, including those of the Baltic Exchange, Guardian Royal Exchange Assurance, RSA Insurance Group, Standard Chartered and Morgan, Grenfell & Co. All the collections previously held at Guildhall Library are now consulted at The London Archives with two exceptions: the archives of Lloyd's of London and of the London Stock Exchange continue to be consulted at Guildhall Library, as do the archives of London's Livery Companies.

Other business records added to the collection in recent years include Bogle-L'Ouverture Publications, a radical Black publishing house founded by Eric and Jessica Huntley in West London in the 1950s; the Huntleys’ personal archive has also been deposited at The London Archives. The archive of The Africa Centre, an organisation promoting African culture and life was deposited in 2018.

=== Charities ===
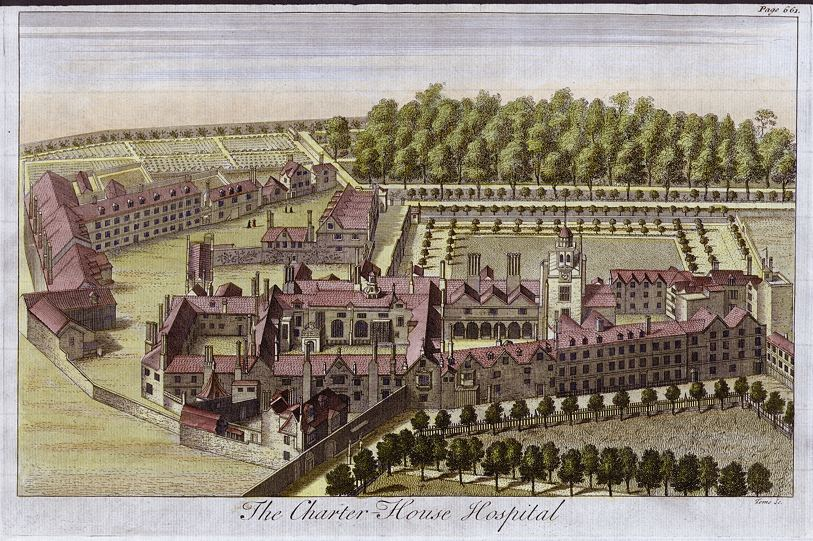
The Charterhouse: an engraving of c.1770

The London Archives' holdings of charities records date from the early 17th century and include notable foundations such as Archbishop Tenison's Grammar School, the Corporation of the Sons of the Clergy and Sutton's Hospital (Charterhouse) which was founded by Thomas Sutton in 1611 for the benefit of distressed gentlemen and the education of poor boys. Many of the charities are concerned with housing, education and medicine. One of the major collections is that of the Charity Organisation Society, now known as the Family Welfare Association which was formed to make sure that charitable organisations did not overlap with each other in terms of what they were trying to achieve.

Amongst the many archives of housing associations held, are records of the Hampstead Garden Suburb. The Hampstead Garden Suburb was the vision and accomplishment of Henrietta Barnett who together with her husband Canon Samuel Augustus Barnett set about creating an estate where the working classes could live within pleasant surroundings. The land near Hampstead was purchased via the Hampstead Garden Suburb Trust that she had formed. A total of 323 acres (1.31 km^{2}) were purchased for £140,000 by 1907. The idea was that the estate would be aesthetically pleasing consisting of low-density housing and thoroughly planned with a mix of buildings and nature. The community would be served by a range of local amenities including churches, libraries, schools, an institute of education and shops. Henrietta wanted to bring different classes together in one area. Unfortunately though the houses may have been more modest, they were still too expensive for many working-class people. Increased building costs and the shortage of local employment meant that the suburb would become largely middle-class. By 1936, building was virtually complete and the suburb was home to some 16,000 people. The collection is particularly valuable to those interested in the history of planned settlements, architecture and the life and work of Henrietta Barnett. The archive consists of records of suburb organisations and recreational societies, education institutions and approximately 10,000 plans and 10,000 photographs.

Among the records of charities are those of the Foundling Hospital, established by royal charter in 1739 by Thomas Coram as a refuge for abandoned children. It was the sole institution responsible for taking in illegitimate children in the London area for a period of well over 120 years. Coram had been appalled by the number of dead and dying babies on the streets of London. Admission to the new hospital was at first limited because of lack of funds. Infants were to be less than two months old and in good health. Once a child had been admitted they were baptised and given a new name and boarded out to a dry or wet nurse in the country. On reaching the age of three, they were returned to the hospital to receive basic schooling before eventually being apprenticed out to trades or service or enlisted in the armed forces. From 1760 the mother was required to submit a written petition detailing her circumstances: these documents provide a valuable resource for social history. Other documents include records of the lives of the children, nursing methods, apothecaries' prescriptions, and inspectors' reports. Some parts of the collection have been returned to the Coram family, while more modern files concerned with the Berkhamsted site are at Hertfordshire Archives and Local Studies.

=== City of London Corporation ===
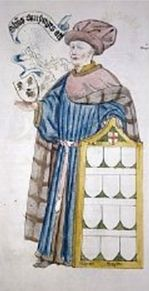
Watercolour portrait of Thomas Canynges, Lord Mayor of London 1456–7, held at The London Archives

The records that were formerly held by the Corporation of London Record Office and now held at The London Archives have been re-catalogued and are now arranged in two distinct sections.

Records with the prefix COL are the administrative and corporate records of the City of London Corporation. Included in this section are the repertories, journals and letter books from the courts of Aldermen and Common Council, records of those receiving the freedom of the City of London from the Chamberlains department as well as numerous plans from the planning and surveyors departments.

Records with the prefix CLA are deposited collections from organisations and bodies that operate in close association with the City of London Corporation. This series includes records of many of the bridges across the Thames and particularly Tower Bridge, many markets including Smithfield, Billingsgate, Spitalfields and Leadenhall, and a number of courts such as Mansion House and Guildhall Justice Rooms and Southwark coroner's court. Records of particular interest in this series are the records of the City of London Sessions, these include criminal trials held before the London jury at the Old Bailey. Another series of particular interest are the records of the City of London Police. Archives include warrant books, more than 95% of all personnel files as well as material relating to the Houndsditch murders and letters sent to the force concerning Jack the Ripper and the Whitechapel murders.

=== Court records ===
The court records held at The London Archives are dominated by one of the finest collection of quarter session records known to exist in the country. The records of the Middlesex and Westminster sessions cover both the judicial and administrative functions of the justices of the peace covering the period 1549–1971. These include sessions of gaol delivery for the Middlesex area, held at the Old Bailey until 1834. Until the 1870s and 1880s, the Middlesex justices were not only responsible for judicial matters in their area, they were also responsible for many of the functions now under the control of local governments. Such roles and responsibilities included county bridges, prisons, lunatic asylums and Feltham Industrial School. The deposited records also include Land and Hearth tax assessments, electoral registers, licensed victuallers, recognizance's, building surveyors returns, enclosure awards and maps and plans of numerous public undertakings such as canals, docks and railways.

The London Archives also holds a number of records of the former Inner London police courts. While many of these courts date from the 18th and 19th centuries, the surviving records often only start in the early 20th century. Included in the same section are records of petty sessions, magistrates' courts and county courts for London and Middlesex. Some magistrates' courts in the London area are not covered and hold no records of the Crown Courts. Perhaps the most popular series of records in this section are the records of coroner's courts. These include the Middlesex area prior to 1889, the London and Middlesex areas from 1889 onwards and the Greater London area after 1965. Unfortunately, the survival rate of coroner's records is only about 10 per cent. They are also subject to a closure period of 75 years as opposed to the 30 years on other court records.

=== Diocesan records ===
The records of the Diocese of London were previously split between London Metropolitan Archives and Guildhall Library Manuscripts Section, but have now been reunited. The records include those of the Consistory Court of London and the Archdeaconry Courts of London and Middlesex as well as administrative and estate records for the diocese as a whole. These records include probate material up to 1858, Tithe maps, Bishops Transcripts and Matrimonial and Testamentary Cause Papers. The archive of St Paul's Cathedral is now also held at The London Archives.

To the south of the River Thames, The London Archives holds records of the Diocese of Winchester including probate and marriage bonds and allegations from the Archdeaconry Court of Surrey as well as probate from the Commissary Court of Surrey. The London Archives also has records of the Diocese of Southwark along with the archive of Southwark Cathedral and the south-east London part of the Diocese of Rochester.

=== Families and individuals ===
Estate records held at The London Archives include the Duke of Bedford's Covent Garden Estate with many of the records relating to the development of the market. Other major estate records in this series are those of the Marquess of Northampton at Clerkenwell and Canonbury and the Maryon-Wilson estates in Hampstead and Charlton. Notable family collections include those of the Marquess of Anglesey, the Clitherow family of Brentford and the Earl of Jersey, whose papers include correspondence with prominent politicians and literary figures; however the Jersey collection can only be viewed after obtaining written permission. The families and Estates series also includes records of more than 80 manors, including those owned by Charterhouse School and St Thomas' Hospital, which cover land extending from Essex to Wiltshire and Yorkshire. Archives of individuals include Mollie Hunte, an influential educational psychologist; Cy Grant, actor, singer, broadcaster, community organiser and activist, who among many other roles voiced Lieutenant Green in Captain Scarlet and the Mysterons; the record office also holds the diary of Robert Hooke, surveyor of the City of London at the time of the Great Fire of 1666 and one of the men appointed to oversee the rebuilding of the City.

=== Hospitals and health authorities ===
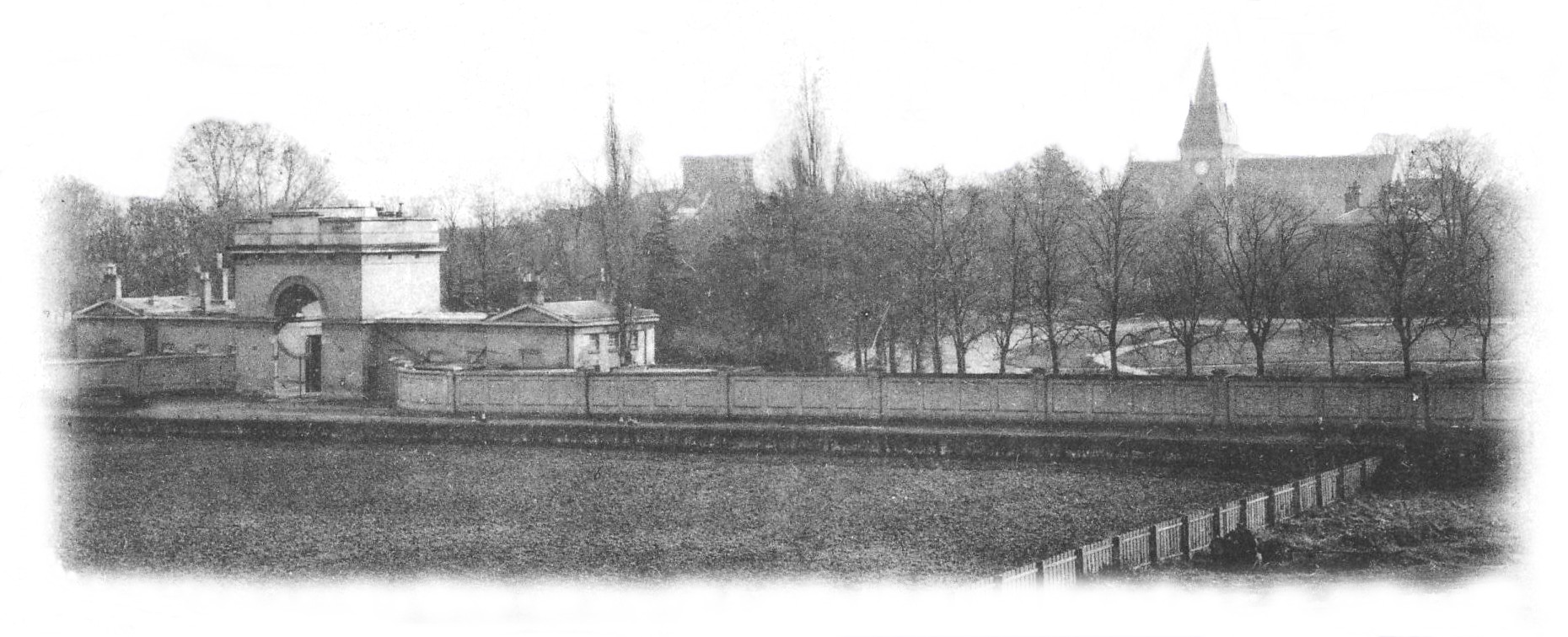
London County Asylum at Hanwell

The London Archives holds records for over 100 hospitals and local regional health authorities within the southeast area. The hospital records range from county asylums such as Hanwell Asylum and Colney Hatch Lunatic Asylum to major teaching hospitals like Guy's Hospital and St Thomas' Hospital and specialist hospitals like Moorfields Eye Hospital and Queen Charlotte's Hospital, right down to much smaller local hospitals. Anybody wishing to find out what hospital records are held at The London Archives would do well to first consult the hospital records database on the National Archives' website.

The collection of records is not arranged alphabetically as many different hospitals may be covered by one particular management trust, therefore it is worth asking at the reference room desk and they will direct you to the particular binder that you need. It is also worth consulting the three leaflets on hospital records that the archive had produced, namely No. 9 – Sources for the history of nursing, which details the Florence Nightingale collection among the records of St Thomas' Hospital – No. 13, a general guide to hospital records, and No. 15, which is concerned with patients' records. All patients' records among the hospitals collections are subject to data protection laws and may be closed access depending on their date.

=== Jewish organisations ===
A large number of the Anglo-Jewish community's archives have been deposited at The London Archives, including records of the Board of Deputies of British Jews, the Office of the Chief Rabbi, the Beth Din, the Federation of Synagogues, the United Synagogue and the Spanish and Portuguese Jews Congregation. Other organisations represented include the Jews' Temporary Shelter and the Jewish Free School. The majority of these records are concerned with management and policy decisions, and many require written permission from the depositor before access can be granted.

=== London local authorities ===
Two very important series of records have been classified under the heading London Local Authorities. The first of these, are the records of the boards of guardians of the poor law union for London and Middlesex. Poor law unions were formed as a result of the new Poor Law Amendment Act 1834, when neighbouring parishes joined together to pool their resources, each of these unions would be administered by a board of guardians. The records consist primarily of general minutes of the board, administrative records including details of staff, settlement examinations, orders of removal, workhouse and infirmary records and school records. The records are arranged by each individual board although the amount of surviving material varies from board to board. The majority of material is from the period 1850 to 1930.

The other major collection in this series are the records of the Middlesex Deeds Registry. By the Middlesex Registry Act 1708 a registry was established for the registration of all deeds, conveyances, wills, encumbrances etc., affecting freehold land and leased land for periods of 21 years or more, within the ancient county of Middlesex. In 1862 the national land register was introduced on a voluntary basis. In 1899 it became compulsory for land in the new area of North London that was formally Middlesex to be registered nationally. This dramatically reduced the amount of entries to the Middlesex Deeds Register, though it continued to serve the outer part of Middlesex until 1938 when all land within Middlesex had to be registered through the national land register. Deeds and documents brought to the registry were copied onto pieces of parchment called memorials and then bound into large volumes or registers. The documents are not complete copies of the originals and certain information such as covenants and other restrictions may be missing. Information entered includes date of the transaction, names of the parties and a description of the property. From the mid-19th century this also often included a plan of the property.

=== London-wide elected bodies ===
As well as the archives of the London County Council, Middlesex County Council, Greater London Council, Inner London Education Authority and the London Residuary Body, The London Archives also hold records of their 19th- and 20th-century predecessors such as the Metropolitan Board of Works, Metropolitan Commission of Sewers, London School Board and the Metropolitan Asylums Board. The records of these bodies are as broad as the functions of modern local government, with documentation on education, housing, health services, welfare, transport, building regulations, drainage, culture and leisure. Many of the different bodies include a series of indexed committee minutes, which often prove to be a valuable starting point when attempting to access the records.

=== Maps ===
The London Archives has an extensive collection of maps numbering in excess of 15,000. Many of the maps are split up amongst the various different collections for example tithes maps found amongst the diocesan records and enclosure maps found amongst court records. Fortunately there is a single card catalogue that combines all of the maps from the various collections and has listed them by the area they cover. Twenty of the most popular maps held by The London Archives are accessible in the map cabinet in the reference room. These include the first edition of the Ordnance Survey for London 1867–70 and the Second World War bomb damage maps. The collection was increased, especially for the City of London, by the addition of the holdings of the Guildhall Library Prints and Maps Section.

=== National records ===
Included in this series are records of the British Waterways Board particularly concerning the River Lea, plans of National Schools in Middlesex and the London Region of English Heritage that took over many of the files and plans of the former Greater London Council Historic Buildings Division. Also featuring in the series of National Records are the archives of Wandsworth (HM Prison) and Wormwood Scrubs (HM Prison). Of the two prisons the Wandsworth records are much more extensive, including administrative and staff records, photographs and prisoners records from 1879. For Wormwood Scrubs the majority of records concern prisoners and begin in 1917.

=== Non-established religions ===
The majority of nonconformist records at The London Archives relate to the Congregationalist, Baptist, United Reformed and Methodist churches, circuits and missions dating predominantly from the 19th and 20th centuries. Some records of a few German churches are held, and some recent marriage registers from a Salvation Army citadel, a Seventh-Day Adventist church, the Kingdom Hall, Wandsworth and a Sikh Gurdwara. As well as baptism, marriage and burial records from individual nonconformist churches, records of several nonconformist organisations such as the London Congregational Union and the New Bunhill Fields Burial Ground are held. The London Archives holds no Roman Catholic records, which are usually retained by the individual church.

=== Parishes ===
The London Archives holds records of more than 900 Anglican churches in the London and Middlesex areas, including over 100 City of London parishes. The types of records held vary from parish to parish, with some parishes only depositing registers of baptisms, marriage and burials. Other parishes, however, have deposited a great deal more and the types of records include vestry minutes, churchwarden accounts, parish poor rate and early workhouse material, parish magazines, plans, photographs and other ephemera.

The London Archives does not generally hold records for parishes within the historic City of Westminster, which are deposited at the City of Westminster Archives Centre; or for those areas of outer London that were historically (before 1965) in the counties of Essex, Kent and Surrey, which are more likely to be held at the Essex Record Office, Kent History and Library Centre or Surrey History Centre respectively.

=== Photograph collection ===
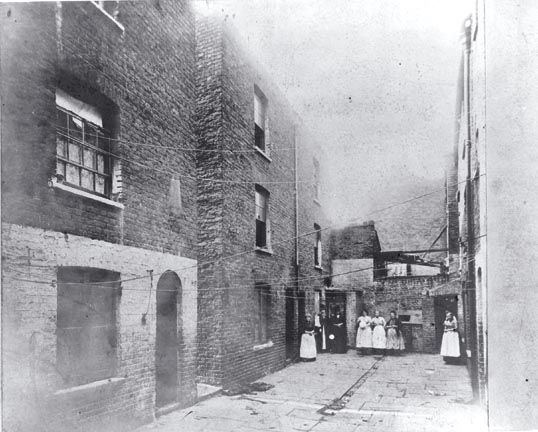
Boundary Street, Shoreditch, photographed in 1890, shortly before it was redeveloped in a slum clearance scheme: from The London Archives' collections

The London Archives' photograph collection contains almost half a million photographs covering the history and topography of London, especially the inner London area. The majority of photos were taken for official purposes by and for the London County Council and Greater London Council. The collection is arranged in two sections. The first section is arranged by alphabetically by subject covering everything from Abbeys to Zoological Gardens. Particularly well covered are subjects such as schools, housing estates, parks, bridges, churches, cinemas, theatres, hospitals, pubs and areas of war damage. The second section is arranged alphabetically by modern London borough and then alphabetically by address.

=== Prints and drawings ===
The prints and drawings collection is similarly arranged to the photograph collection, with a greater focus on the inner London areas. It is also arranged both topographically and by subject. Most of the prints and drawings date from the 18th and 19th centuries. The prints collection has been made considerably richer by the addition of the print collection from Guildhall Library, which includes prints relating to the City of London.

=== Film and video ===
The London Archives holds many films produced by bodies including London Transport, the Greater London Council and the Corporation of London. Some of these films are accessible on YouTube. In 2019 London Metropolitan Archives took in an extraordinary collection of filmed oral history interviews created by the National HIV Story Trust (formerly The AIDS Since the 80s Project); the interviews contain first-hand testimonies of people living with HIV, and form the basis of educational resources, talks, films and publications in order to improve knowledge and understanding of HIV.

== Library ==
The London Archives' library started as the library of the former members of the London County Council. It contains more than 100,000 volumes and specialises in all aspects of London life, the growth and development of the area, its history and organisation of Local Government. The library is purely a reference library and its holdings can be searched via Guildhall Library's online catalogue.

== Finding aids and resources ==
A search of The London Archives' holdings can be done online by accessing its website and navigating to its online catalogue.

The London Picture Archive is a website holding visual images from The London Archives' photograph, print and other collections. Images can be licensed or purchased for home use through the site.

A programme of digitisation of major genealogical sources, including Anglican and non-conformist registers, school registers, electoral registers, Boards of Guardians records, City of London freedom records, wills, Land Tax records and records of transportation has been running for some years now, in partnership with Ancestry.com. The resulting digital records are available by subscription through Ancestry's website, which can also be searched free of charge via computer terminals in The London Archives' search room.
