= Meath Protestant Industrial School =

School in Ireland

Information
- Religious affiliation(s): Church of Ireland
- Established: 1871
- Closed: 1917
- Gender: Boys

Meath Protestant Industrial School was an industrial school for protestant boys, in Blackrock, Dublin, founded in 1871. It was originally situated Elm cliff, near the station, on land leased by the Earl of Meath and other benevolent members of society, it then moved in 1877 to Avondale House off Carysfort Avenue, Blackrock, Dublin. While it was a reform school, it also took in boys who were found destitute or begging.

Protestant (Church of Ireland) religious instruction was provided to the boys in the institution, alongside school subjects, the boys were taught vocational skills, like shoemaking, tailoring and watchmaking.

The Earl of Meath also supported and gave his name to the Meath Protestant Female Industrial School in Bray, Co. Wicklow. Edward Cecil Guinness donated £60 in order to purchase musical instruments and form a school band, and a brass band was set up under a Mr. Johnson as the conductor.

In 1885 when the Kerry Home Industrial School for Protestant Boys closed, boys were transferred to the Meath Industrial School and it was expanded to facilitate them.

In 1886 the school sent three boys to Canada.

In 1917 boys were transferred to another protestant school, Balmoral Industrial School, Belfast, when it was commandeered by the war office and the building was used as a military Hospital (Blackrock Military Orthopaedic Hospital).

Records of the school are held in the Church of Ireland Representative Body.

The writer James Stephens was committed to the school for begging as a child.
