= Kerry Home Industrial School for Protestant Boys =

Former childcare and education facility, Tralee, Ireland

Kerry Home Industrial School for Protestant Boys was an Irish industrial school for protestant boys, Princes Quay (Street), in Tralee, County Kerry, founded in 1872. The Rev. Raymond Orpen, the Rector of Tralee (and future Bishop of Limerick, Ardfert and Aghadoe) was the manager of the school. The school was managed in connection with the Board of National Education, and subject to the District Inspector of the Board, E. Dowling, esq. As well as school subjects and music, boys were taught tailoring and knitting.

In 1885 when the school was closed, boys were transferred to the Meath Protestant Industrial School for Boys in Blackrock, Dublin.
