= Barrett Juvenile Correctional Center =

- Virginia Industrial Home School for Colored Girls
- U.S. National Register of Historic Places
- U.S. Historic district
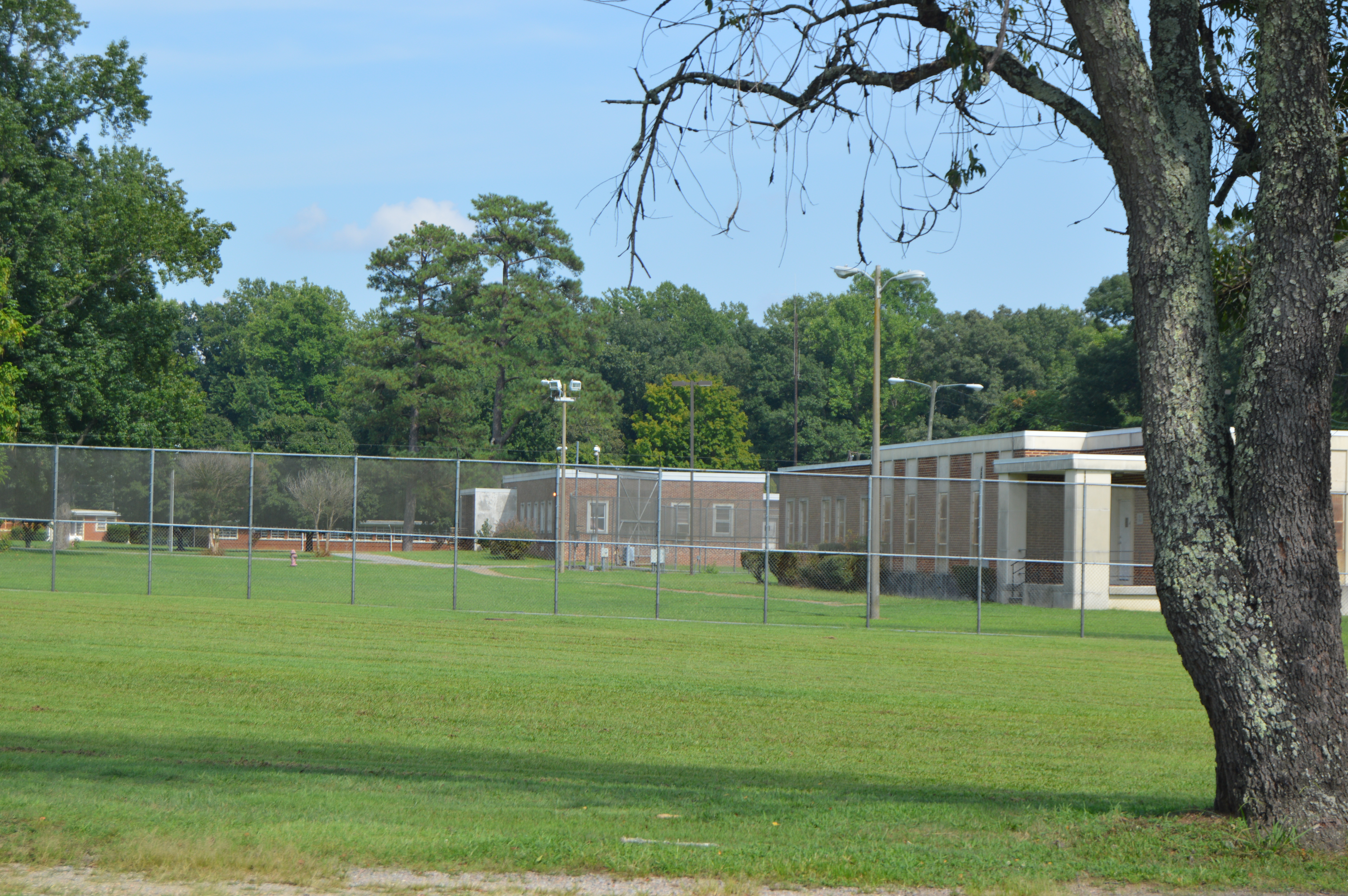
- Buildings in the complex

- Location within Virginia Location within the United States
- Location: 11391 Barrett Center Rd., near Mechanicsville, Virginia
- Coordinates: 37°42′39″N 77°21′42″W
- Built: 1915
- Architect: Additions by Merrill C. Lee
- NRHP reference No.: 15000926
- Added to NRHP: October 7, 2016

The Barrett Juvenile Correctional Center, also known as the Barrett Learning Center and originally as the Virginia Industrial Home School for Wayward Colored Girls and then the Virginia Industrial Home School for Colored Girls, was a residential industrial school and later a juvenile correctional facility operated by the state of Virginia near Mechanicsville, Virginia.

The facility was founded in 1915 as a facility for African-American girls who otherwise faced prison.

== History ==
The property was donated by the Virginia Federation of Colored Women's Clubs. The Women's Club worked to provide a nurturing environment to enable the girls to become "respectable, useful women". The facility had the first African-American woman, Janie Porter Barrett, to head such an institution.

The facility was fully integrated by race in 1965, became coed in 1977, and then served an exclusively male population from 1978 until its closure in 2005. The campus has a collection of mid-20th century buildings designed by Richmond architect Merrill C. Lee, and was listed on the National Register of Historic Places in 2016. Records for the institution are in the Library of Virginia.

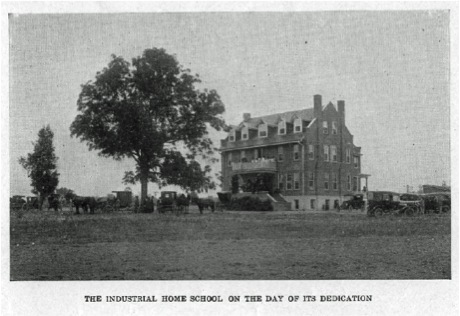
Virginia Industrial Home School for Wayward Colored Girls

== See also ==
- National Register of Historic Places listings in Hanover County, Virginia
- Virginia Industrial School for Colored Girls, Social Welfare History Project
