= Industrieschule =

18th–19th-century vocational schools

Industrieschule (pl. Industrieschulen; English: industrial school) was a type of school that emerged in German-speaking countries in the second half of the 18th century, combining basic academic instruction with manual training to prepare children for trades, crafts, and industrial occupations.

== History ==
The first Industrieschulen were founded in 1779 in Bohemia by the later bishop Ferdinand Kindermann. Further schools followed in the ensuing years in Germany, Austria, and occasionally in Switzerland. They were intended primarily for children of the lower social classes, to educate them for productive work in the emerging industrial society. Boys learned spinning, gardening, or tree care; girls learned knitting, sewing, or mending.

In line with philanthropists such as Ludwig Gerhard Wagemann and Heinrich Philipp Sextro, Johann Heinrich Pestalozzi also emphasized the combination of manual labor with formal schooling and the transmission of knowledge. The aim was Industriosität — the acquisition of diligence, commercial, artistic, and innovative industry. "Industrial educators" (Industriepädagogen), among them Philipp Emanuel von Fellenberg with his Meikirch colony, stressed constant activity so that idleness and vice would be prevented and the poor "ennobled."

The Industrieschulen did not establish themselves durably, because the institutions were expected to be self-supporting and were therefore exposed to economic competition. This placed emphasis on production and pushed basic instruction to the margins. With the advance of industrialization, child labor also shifted into the new large factories.

As vocational, trade, craft, and civic schools developed in the first half of the 19th century — including commercial and transport schools — and as needlework instruction was introduced while children's labor was exploited in factories, the Industrieschulen gradually dissolved. Schools that still existed in the second half of the 19th century prepared older pupils for technical and trade occupations. In Switzerland, several Industrieschulen were established as technical departments of cantonal schools (Kantonsschulen), for example in Zürich in 1832.

== Bibliography ==
=== Literature ===
- P. Gonon, "Schule im Spannungsfeld zwischen Arbeit, elementarer Bildung und Beruf", in Geschichte der Erziehung und Schule in der Schweiz im 19. und 20. Jahrhundert, ed. H. Badertscher, H.-U. Grunder, 1997, pp. 58–88.
