= Virginia Department of Juvenile Justice =

Virginia Department of Juvenile Justice (DJJ)
Agency overview
- Type: State agency
- Jurisdiction: Virginia
- Status: Operational
- Headquarters: Main Street Centre, 600 East Main St., Richmond, Virginia
- Agency executives: Robert Bermingham Jr., Director; Marilyn G. Brown, Chief Deputy Director; Linda McWilliams, Deputy Director for Community Programs; Nikia D. Jones, Deputy Director of Administration and Finance; Michael Favale, Deputy Director of Legislation and Policy; Ashaki McNeil, Deputy Director of Reentry, Education and Intervention; Andrea McMahon, Deputy Director of Placement and Program Implementation
- Child agencies: Bon Air Juvenile Correctional Center; Central Admission and Placement

The Virginia Department of Juvenile Justice (DJJ) is a state agency of Virginia, headquartered in the Main Street Centre building at 600 East Main St. in Richmond. The DJJ operates 30 court service units and one juvenile correctional center.

== Personnel Organization ==
As of January 2026, the DJJ executive staff consists of seven members:

- DJJ Director: Robert Bermingham Jr.
- Chief Deputy Director: Marilyn G. Brown
- Deputy Director for Community Programs: Linda McWilliams
- Deputy Director of Administration and Finance: Nikia D. Jones
- Deputy Director of Legislation and Policy: Michael Favale
- Deputy Director of Reentry, Education and Intervention: Ashaki McNeil
- Deputy Director of Placement and Program Implementation: Andrea McMahon

== Facilities ==
All DJJ secure correctional facilities are in unincorporated areas. Facilities include:

- Bon Air Juvenile Correctional Center (Chesterfield County) - Chartered in 1906 by a private group and opened in Bon Air on a 206 acre farm in 1910, the Virginia Home and Industrial School for Girls was transferred to the State of Virginia in 1914 to enable care and training of "incorrigible white girls"... Currently serving both males and females ages 11–20
- Central Admission and Placement (Chesterfield County)

== Closed facilities ==
- Barrett Juvenile Correctional Center (Hanover County) - Opened in 1915 as the Virginia Industrial School for Colored Girls, it was originally established by the Virginia Federation of Colored Women's Clubs and Janie Porter Barrett. The state took over management of the facility in 1920 and began incarcerating adjudicated black females. In 1965 the facility racially integrated. In 1977 it established a pilot program where male and female juvenile prisoners lived together, and the prison began to only serve male juveniles in 1978.
- Beaumont Juvenile Correctional Center (Powhatan County) - Serves older males up to age 21, As of 2015 it held about 230 inmates Facility officially closed on June 9, 2017, after having been slated for closure by the DJJ in March 2016
- Culpeper Juvenile Correctional Center (Culpeper County) - Housed males ages 18–20 Due to budget cuts by the Governor, Culpeper closed in June 2014 to become an Adult Women's Prison with the Virginia Department of Corrections. It had an opening scheduled for July 2017, but it was delayed until July 2018.
- Hanover Juvenile Correctional Center (Hanover County) - It was established in 1898, and the State of Virginia acquired the facility in 1920. The 1,808-acre (732 ha) complex had space for 120 prisoners. The site is now home to the Virginia Public Safety Training Center and the Virginia Department of Corrections’ Pamunkey Farm agribusiness operation.
- Natural Bridge Juvenile Correctional Center (Rockbridge County) - Located on a 100-acre (40 ha) property on a U.S. Department of Agriculture Civilian Conservation Corp Camp in the Jefferson Natural Forest. - Closed on October 10, 2009
- Oak Ridge Correctional Center (Chesterfield County) - Served persons with severe development issues. As of 2010 it had about 40 inmates.
