= Colorado State Industrial School for Boys =

Coordinates: 39.7432°N 105.2068°W

Colorado State Industrial School for Boys, established in 1881 in Golden, Colorado, was a reform school for boys ages 7 to 16 who had been convicted of a crime. In 1887, an additional school was established for girls who had were convicted of crimes, pregnant, or homeless. Boys at the school were taught skills for manual labor jobs while girls were taught domestic skills. Journalist Eudochia Bell Smith covered the school and got into politics to reform it.

In 1949, the state of Colorado began to overturn a law indicating that "children must earn the full cost of their upbringing with labor,” which had served as the guidepost for reform schools by forcing the children in care to work for their position in the facility.

In 1968, the facility was renamed as the Lookout Mountain School for Boys. In the 1980s, it was the transformed into a maximum-security corrections facility for boys and men ages 15 to 21 who had been convicted of a crime. At this time, it was renamed the Lookout Mountain Youth Services Center.

As of 2023, it is known as the Campus at Lookout Mountain (CALM) and includes several youth centers, the Aspire Youth Services Center, Golden Peak Youth Services Center, and Summit Youth Services Center.

== See also ==
- Colorado Division of Youth Services
- Colorado School of Mines
- Colorado University Schools
