= Jews' Temporary Shelter =

UK Jewish homeless charity

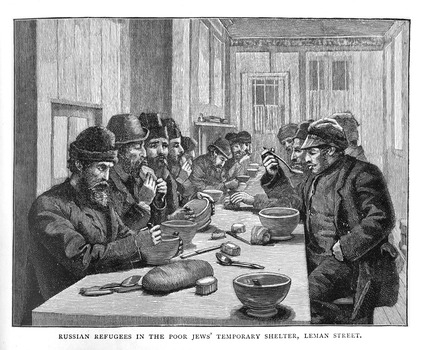
Russian refugees in the Leman Street shelter, drawn by Ellen Gertrude Cohen for the Illustrated London News in 1891

The Jews' Temporary Shelter is a charity in London which helps homeless Jews.

Around 1879, a Polish immigrant baker, Samuel Cohen, began to shelter Jewish immigrants from Eastern Europe (particularly Poland and Russia) in his bakery in Whitechapel's Church Lane. The accommodation was improvised with sacks of flour being used as bedding and, in 1885, a sanitary inspector closed it. A public meeting was held at the Jewish Working Men's Club and a group of wealthy Jews led by Hermann Landau, established the Poor Jews' Temporary Shelter. The first location was in Great Garden Street but a more permanent shelter was established in Leman Street on 11 April 1886.

In 1973, the Shelter relocated to Willesden. Today the charity provides maintenance grants rather than supplying accommodation directly.
