= East London Industrial School =

The East London Industrial School was an industrial school which existed from 1854 to 1924. The school was originally based in Leman Street, Whitechapel but moved to 18 Brookbank Road, Lewisham in 1884.

From 1890 to 1897 arrangements were made for the school to receive all Jewish boys committed to industrial schools, to ensure the observance of Jewish religious practices such as the Jewish sabbath.
