= Colored Industrial School of Cincinnati =

Trade school in Cincinnati

Location
- 1301 John Street; Cincinnati, Ohio; United States; 39°6′30″N 84°31′24″W (Note: This was the school's second location; the first was at 724 W. Sixth Street.)

Information
- Other names: McCall School; McCall Colored Industrial School
- Type: Trade school for African American students Funded by private endowment
- Opened: 1914
- Founder: Sallie J. McCall
- Closed: 1962

Colored Industrial School of Cincinnati (also known McCall School and McCall Colored Industrial School) was a school for African Americans in Cincinnati, Ohio. It was established in 1914 at 724 W. Sixth Street.

The school was established on property donated by Sallie J. McCall in her 1909 will. A trade school, courses included carpentry, masonry, cement work, automobile mechanics, driving, domestic science, dressmaking, and millinery. Through a $400,000 endowment McCall established, equivalent to $12,857,143 in 2025, the school did not charge tuition. Between 1914 and 1926 it had 600 graduates. In the 1930s it was relocated to 1301 John Street.

Several years after Robert A. Taft Information Technology High School opened nearby, in 1962 Colored Industrial School of Cincinnati closed. Scholarships were established for African American students with the endowment's remaining funds.
