= Timeline of RTÉ Television =

Timeline of the RTÉ Television channel in Ireland

This is a timeline of the RTÉ Television channel in Ireland. In its early years, the channel was called Telefís Éireann (Irish: "Television of Ireland")

== 1960s ==
=== 1960 ===
- 6 April – The Broadcasting Authority Act, establishing a new television service for the Republic of Ireland, is enacted.
- 1 June – RTÉ Television is founded.

=== 1961 ===
- 5 September – Telefís Éireann begins transmission of test pictures.
- December – The first issue of RTV Guide, RTÉ's original programme journal, is published.
- 31 December – Launch of Telefís Éireann. Its opening night includes an address by President Éamon de Valera, and the first news bulletin read by Charles Mitchel.

=== 1962 ===
- January – First broadcast of the weekday topical news magazine programme Broadsheet on Telefís Éireann.
- 12 January – First broadcast of the long-running religious and social documentary series Radharc.
- February – The BBC relays commentary of the Friendship 7 space flight which sees astronaut John Glenn become the first American to orbit the Earth.
- April – Telefís Éireann staff move to the Montrose studios in Donnybrook following the completion. Until then they had been in temporary accommodation in Dublin city centre.
- May – Telefís Éireann shows the first party political broadcast following that year's Budget.
- 6 July – The Late Late Show, one of the longest-running talk shows in the world, airs for the first time.
- Autumn – Edward J. Roth resigns as Director-General of RTÉ. He is succeeded in December by Kevin C. McCourt.

=== 1963 ===
- 1 June – Gunnar Rugheimer is appointed Controller of Programmes of Telefís Éireann.
- 26–29 June – Telefís Éireann provides extensive coverage of the visit of U.S. President John F. Kennedy.
- 18 October – The wildlife programme Amuigh Faoin Spéir (Irish: "Out Under the Sky") airs for the first time.
- November – Father Romuald Dodd is appointed to advise on the broadcasting of Catholic Religious Programmes.

=== 1964 ===
- 3 January – Tolka Row, an urban drama serial by Maura Laverty first goes on air.
- January – Reverend Fergus Day, of the Church of Ireland is appointed to advise on the broadcasting of Protestant religious programmes.
- 4 February – Telefís Scoile, one of the earliest teaching programmes for schools on television in Europe is first aired by Telefís Éireann.
- March – Patrick Jennings appointed RTÉ's Agricultural Advisor.
- 14 September – Newsbeat, a topical and often humorous programme, first goes on air. It features reporters Frank Tuomey and Frank Hall with caption stories by cartoonist Terry Williers.

=== 1965 ===
- January – Telefís Éireann and BBC collaborate on an historic television broadcast as Taoiseach Seán Lemass and Prime Minister of Northern Ireland Terence O'Neill meet for the first time in Belfast.
- 4 January – First airing of The Riordans, a rural drama serial, which became the inspiration for the UK soap Emmerdale Farm.
- 20 March – Ireland enters the Eurovision Song Contest for the first time with I'm Walking the Streets in the Rain performed by Butch Moore.
- 7 April – Ireland's first televised General Election coverage, presented by John O'Donoghue and produced by Gerry Murray.
- 2 May – Telefís Feirme, an innovative programme designed for group viewing and discussions in rural communities is first aired.
- May – Second RTÉ Authority appointed.

=== 1966 ===
- 8 March – The Broadcast Authority (Amendment) Act comes into law, changing the corporate name of Radio Éireann to Radio Telefís Éireann.
- 10 April – RTÉ's current affairs programme, Seven Days is first aired.
- 10–17 April – RTÉ Television airs the dramas Insurrection and Cuimhneacháin 1916 to commemorate the 50th anniversary of the Easter Rising.
- May – Todd Andrews is appointed Chairman of the RTÉ Authority following the resignation of the previous incumbent Eamonn Andrews.

=== 1967 ===
- April – RTÉ Television abandons its plans to provide coverage of the Vietnam War following intervention from the Irish government.
- 16 July – The Irish language current affairs programme, Féach is first aired by RTÉ Television.
- 30 September – The popular and long-running children's programme, Wanderly Wagon is first aired on television.

=== 1968 ===
- January – RTÉ's Director-General Kevin McCourt makes the controversial decision to recall the Seven Days crew as they are en route to report on the Biafran War.
- 12 February – Director-General McCourt announces the transfer of responsibility for Seven Days to the RTÉ News Division, a decision which leads to industrial unrest and the suspension of several members of the production team for "blacking" the programme on air. The dispute is finally resolved in March.
- 16 March – Thomas P. Hardiman replaced Kevin McCourt as Director-General of RTÉ, and is the first Director-General to be appointed internally within the organisation.

=== 1969 ===
- February – RTÉ opens a studio in Belfast, and subsequently becomes an important international provider of coverage relating to events in Northern Ireland.
- 20 July – Telefís Éireann, which normally stopped broadcasting by midnight during the 1960s, transmitted its first all-night programme when the first men landed on the Moon at 9.17 pm, Irish time. The moonwalk began at 3.39 the next morning and ended at 6.11. The entire broadcast was hosted live by Kevin O'Kelly, working alone in front of the camera, and he won a Jacob's Television Award for his performance.
- 11 November – The Irish government establishes a judicial tribunal to investigate the content of an edition of Seven Days that investigated money lenders. Among the issues examined are complaints by members of the Garda Síochána (police) that they were misrepresented. In 1970 the tribunal concludes that the programme did not present sufficient evidence to support allegations that the Gárdaí had failed to do enough to stop money lending.
- Unknown – Live relays from the Oireachtas to mark the fiftieth anniversary of the first Dáil Éireann.

== 1970s ==
=== 1970 ===
- May – Finnish Television airs a four-hour broadcast of RTÉ programmes titled Ireland Tonight. The broadcast includes King of the Road, a film of the life of a Tipperary roadworker, the children's series Wanderly Wagon, Guests of the Nation, a dramatisation of Frank O'Connor's short story; Ballad Sheet, July the Mad Month, a film on the political and religious situation in Northern Ireland, and Sports Magazine.

=== 1971 ===
- 17 March – RTÉ broadcasts the first domestic television footage in colour – coverage of the Railway Cup Finals from Croke Park, Dublin.
- Unknown – The Eurovision News Exchange enables RTÉ to link with other European and U.S. broadcasting networks.
- Unknown – Establishment of RTÉ Relays to provide commercial service for wired television.

=== 1972 ===
- 23 June – The Irish government meets with the RTÉ Authority to express its displeasure at RTÉ Television's decision to air film of IRA members.
- 24 November – The government dismisses the RTÉ Authority and a new authority is appointed.

=== 1973 ===
- February – The Broadcasting Review Committee published an interim report recommending the establishment of a second television channel for the Republic of Ireland. It is envisaged that it will broadcast a mix of domestic and foreign programming.

=== 1974 ===
- May – In its long-awaited report the Broadcasting Review Committee endorses a second television channel for Ireland.
- Undated – The limit on the number of households that can be connected to high-specification aerial is abolished. Furthermore, it is agreed that RTÉ will receive a percentage of gross rental income from television aerial contractors by way of compensation for the estimated loss of advertising revenue RTÉ will experience due to competition with other television stations.
- Undated – The cable television company RTÉ Relays Ltd (later Cablelink) is established.

=== 1975 ===
- 6 January – RTÉ Television begins broadcasting News for the Deaf, the first daily broadcast of news for deaf people.
- 23 September – Going Strong, a series for the elderly presented by Bunny Carr and Ann O'Dwyer is first aired.
- October – Geraldine McInerney becomes the first female newsreader on RTÉ Television.
- Undated – Oliver Maloney is appointed Director-General of RTÉ.

=== 1976 ===
- 18 October – Minister for Posts and Telegraphs Conor Cruise O'Brien issues a directive to RTÉ providing clarification on the organisations whose members are banned from broadcast. The move follows the issuing of the original directive regarding this issue in 1971.

=== 1977 ===
- 5 July – Pádraig Faulkner is appointed Minister for Posts and Telegraphs.

=== 1978 ===
- January – The controversial secondary school drama The Spike goes on air. It was removed from the schedule following a nude scene in Episode 5 which sparked criticism from Irish conservatives, and has never been retransmitted.
- 2 November – Ireland's second television channel, RTÉ 2 goes on air. The opening night features a variety gala performance from the Cork Opera House and the 1968 film Bullitt.
- November – The UK soap Coronation Street is aired for the first time on RTÉ 2. It had previously only been available to those who could receive UTV or HTV Wales.

=== 1979 ===
- January – RTÉ establishes an internal working party to investigate the representation of women in news reporting. Their findings are published in April 1981.

== 1980s ==
=== 1981 ===
- 11 November – RTÉ Television begins airing the Irish language adult education programme Anois 's Arís.
- Unknown – RTÉ is given special government permission to broadcast two television programmes that are part of a series jointly produced with the BBC titled The Troubles. The programmes include interviews with organisations banned from the media by Section 31 of the Broadcasting Authority Act.

=== 1982 ===
- February – The Government issues a directive to RTÉ to prohibit the airing of party political broadcasts by Sinn Féin, the political wing of the Provisional IRA.
- 31 October – RTÉ Television airs the drama The Ballroom of Romance, a drama based on the novel by William Trevor. The programme is a joint production with the BBC).

=== 1983 ===
- 11 September – The rural drama series Glenroe is first aired on RTÉ Television.
- 29 October – The Late Late Show is broadcast live from New York.

=== 1984 ===
- 1–4 June – RTÉ presents live coverage of U.S. President Ronald Reagan's visit to Ireland. RTÉ sends twice-daily newsfeeds to Eurovision for world distribution during the visit. The coverage includes an interview with Reagan recorded in Washington for the programme Today Tonight and a special edition of Newstime which is broadcast on U.S. television.

=== 1985 ===
- March – Vincent Finn is appointed Director-General of RTÉ.

=== 1986 ===
- The first teletext pages are shown during the afternoon on RTE2 as part of experimental tests for the forthcoming launch of RTE's teletext service Aertel.
- 9 November – The current affairs series Questions and Answers first goes on air. It is presented by Olivia O'Leary.

=== 1987 ===
- 22 June – RTÉ Television's Aertel teletext service is formally launched after two years of test transmissions.

=== 1988 ===
- September – RTÉ 2 is rebranded as Network 2 as part of a major overhaul of the channel.

=== 1989 ===
- 18 September – Irish television soap Fair City is first transmitted.

== 1990s ==
=== 1990 ===
- 25 June – A season 4 episode of American sitcom ALF is deferred due to an extended broadcast of the football match between the Republic of Ireland and Romania at Italia '90. The episode due to air was the season's 20th; "Mr. Sandman". After a scoreless draw, the Irish side advanced, winning the penalty shootout 5 goals to 4.

=== 1991 ===
- 30 January – Proceedings from the Dáil Éireann, the lower house of the Irish parliament are aired on a regular basis.

=== 1992 ===
- 21 January – RTE goes on strike. Around 1,600 staff at RTE from three unions (SIPTU, NUJ and ETU) had gone on strike over staffing levels at RTE. The dispute began on 21 January 1992 when two person camera crews were introduced without the agreement of the SIPTU union. For nearly four weeks, all live home produced programming on both RTE One and Network Two were axed, with RTE filling its schedules with already recorded home produced shows along with a large amount of imported new programming and archive programming from the BBC, ITV, Channel 4, USA and Australia, along with many films. RTE News output on television was reduced to short news summaries. It ended on 17 February 1992 with a resolution reached between the unions and RTE management.
- 28 December – The Irish language drama serial Ros na Rún is first aired on RTÉ Television as a series of 15-minute episodes.
- Unknown – Coronation Street moves from Network 2 to RTÉ 1.

=== 1993 ===
- Undated – RTÉ establishes an Independent Production Unit as part of its response to the Broadcasting Authority (Amendment) Act.

=== 1995 ===
- July – RTÉ appoints Mark Little as its first Washington Correspondent.

=== 1996 ===
- 24 May – The RTÉ website, www.rte.ie, is launched.
- 31 October – The Irish language television service Teilifís na Gaeilge (TG4) goes on air for the first time.

=== 1997 ===
- 8 January – Bob Collins is appointed Director-General of RTÉ.
- September – The RTÉ Authority seeks permission from the Irish Government to find a partner to fund digital terrestrial television (DTT).

=== 1998 ===
- September- Television goes 24 hours a day.

=== 1999 ===
- 1 February – RTÉ News Online is launched.
- 6 May – CableLink, the cable television company which is part owned by RTÉ is sold to NTL Communications for more than £535 million.
- Summer – Helen O'Rahilly is appointed as the first female Director of Television at RTÉ. She left in 2000 to take up a position at the BBC in London.
- 1 October – Despite airing in Northern Ireland and several parts of Ireland with access to UK television networks since its television debut in 1963, the long running UK science fiction series Doctor Who finally airs in the Republic of Ireland for the first time ever on TG4. The series will be paired up with the 1940 film Flash Gordon Conquers the Universe as part of the Sci-Fi block Back to the Future. However seeing as Flash Gordon Conquers the Universe won't be broadcast for the first two weeks, a double bill of Doctor Who will be shown instead to fill the hour slot. Spearhead from Space the very first serial of the seventh season and the first serial to star Jon Pertwee as the Third Doctor will be the very first Doctor Who serial to be shown in Ireland.
- 31 December – RTÉ presents Millennium Eve: Celebrate 2000, coverage of the turn of the millennium from 31 December 1999 into 1 January 2000. The programme is part of the international strand 2000 Today to celebrate the occasion.

== 2000s ==
=== 2000 ===
- 1 June – A new RTÉ Authority is appointed.
- Unknown – RTÉ undergoes a programme of restructuring.
- Unknown – RTÉ establishes a Programme Development Fund to invest £25 million in indigenous programming over the next five years.

=== 2001 ===
- 1 January – The ITV soap Coronation Street moves from RTÉ 1 to TV3 following Granada plc's purchase of a stake in the commercial broadcaster.
- March – RTÉ 1 begins airing BBC One soap EastEnders, the series having previously been shown on TV3.
- 6 May – Glenroe airs for the last time.
- October – RTÉ Television News introduces subtitles.
- 3 November – RTÉ signs up to the Sky Digital Platform.

=== 2003 ===
- September – "RTÉ News" is merged with "RTÉ Current Affairs" to form "RTÉ News and Current Affairs".
- 20 November – RTÉ Audience Council announced.

=== 2004 ===
- Unknown – Network 2 is rebranded as RTÉ Two.

=== 2005 ===
- 3 March – Taoiseach Bertie Ahern opens RTÉ's new studios in London, based at Millbank opposite the British Houses of Parliament.

=== 2007 ===
- January – RTÉ announces plans to launch a channel with the working title of RTÉ International, designed to offer programmes from RTÉ One, RTÉ Two, and TG4.
- 1 April – The RTÉ Irish language channel, TG4, becomes a separate entity. Previously it had been operated as a subsidiary of RTÉ under the name Telefís na Gaeilge.

=== 2008 ===
- 12 June – RTÉ News Now is launched as an online service.
- 27 July – For the first time, the annual Reek Sunday Mass on the summit of Croagh Patrick is broadcast live worldwide by RTÉ. It is celebrated by Bishop Michael Neary, who speaks of consumer values that he feels are seducing society.
- 2 November – RTÉ postpones the planned launch of RTÉ Entertainment, citing financial circumstances. The broadcaster had written to Eamon Ryan during October claiming that it would be "unwise" for it to continue with the plan. RTÉ said it intended to honour the commitment in the 2007 Broadcasting Act and hoped to launch the station by the end of 2009. A spokeswoman for Eamon Ryan says the decision to postpone the launch of the channel is "a reflection of the financial realities in Ireland and worldwide". She adds that the minister is committed to the idea of "RTÉ International" and that it could be a "brilliant product" similar to BBC World News.
- December – RTÉ News moves out of its usual Studio Three in RTÉ Studios in Donnybrook, Dublin, and relocates to a temporary studio while work is carried out Studio Three for a relaunch. The new look is unveiled on the One O'Clock News programme on Monday 9 February 2009.

=== 2009 ===
- 9 February – The new look RTÉ News is unveiled on the One O'Clock News programme.
- 21 September – RTÉ Television relaunched The Angelus broadcast before RTÉ News: Six One, featuring seven different editions, with seven respective people for each one.

== 2010s ==
=== 2010 ===
- 19 September – Long running children's television block The Den gets axed after being shown on Irish television for over 24 years on RTÉ Two.
- 28 September – Launch of RTÉ Two's block of programmes for children, TRTÉ.
- 29 October – Launch of Saorview, the national free-to-air digital terrestrial television (DTT) service in the Republic of Ireland. The service operates on a trial basis.
- 29 October – RTÉ News Now launches as a free-to-air channel on Saorview.
- November – RTÉ News Now's iPhone app wins Best Media app, Best Apple App and the Grand Prix awards at 'The Appy's 2010 with The Carphone Warehouse'.
- 9 November – Noel Curran is appointed Director-General of RTÉ.

=== 2011 ===
- 25 May – RTÉ News Now revamps its on-screen identity, giving viewers more detailed content.
- 2FM is funded by the licence fee for the first time in its history.
- 26 May – Saorview, the free to air digital television service is launched. The service has eight channels – RTÉ One, RTÉ Two HD, TV3, TG4, RTÉ News Now, 3e, RTÉjr and RTÉ One + 1 – and is available to 97% of households in Ireland. Saorview also carries a new digital RTÉ Aertel service and RTÉ's radio services.

=== 2012 ===
- TV50, a series of special events throughout 2012, celebrating the 50th anniversary of the launch of RTÉ Television, then known as Telefís Éireann, on 31 December 1961.
- 17 January – RTÉ agrees to scrap its advertising "share deal" scheme from July following an investigation by the Competition Authority. Rival broadcaster TV3 had argued the practice, in which RTÉ offered a discount to any advertiser which committed a percentage of its budget for television advertising to them was anti-competitive.
- 17 March – Debut of RTÉ's #HowToBeIrish, a programme made entirely of clips sent in by viewers explaining what being Irish means to them.
- 6 April – RTÉ breaks with the Good Friday tradition of not sounding the Angelus bells by broadcasting them as usual on television. They are also heard for the first time on Holy Saturday, a move contrary to Catholic practice which is for them to be silenced to mark the period between the Crucifixion and Resurrection of Jesus. RTÉ argues that the daily prayer belongs to everyone rather than a single faith.
- 2 May – RTÉ reaches an agreement with Equity and the Irish Playwrights and Screenwriters' Guild to allow them to make their soap Fair City available on RTÉ Player and RTÉ One + 1.
- 14 May – RTÉ Two HD launches on Sky HD.
- 29 May – The UK Government confirms that television viewers in Northern Ireland will be able to watch RTÉ One, RTÉ Two, and TG4 on Freeview following the digital switchover.
- 24 July – RTÉ subsidiary company RTÉ Transmission Network Ltd (RTÉ NL) is to be rebranded, and located away from the Donnybrook campus as part of an ongoing restructuring at the broadcaster.
- 22 October – RTÉ Director of News and Current Affairs Kevin Bakhurst rules out a breakfast television programme for the broadcaster on cost grounds.

=== 2013 ===
- 16 December – Launch of RTÉ One HD.

=== 2014 ===
- 2 April – RTÉ Two announces the launch of The RTÉ Two New Voices Award, in conjunction with the National Student Media Awards, which will give students an opportunity to compete for a summer work placement at the station.
- 13 July – Veteran RTÉ Sportscaster Bill O'Herlihy presents his final sports broadcast for the network after 50 years, with coverage of the 2014 FIFA World Cup Final.
- 11 September – RTÉ Two reveals its new schedule, and confirms a rebranding back to its original name of 'RTÉ 2'.
- 22 September – RTÉ2's rebranding takes effect. New programming includes a revamped news programme, News Feed, presented by Carla O'Brien.
- 5 November – RTÉ announce the axing of their morning news programme, Morning Edition, which the broadcaster says will not return to the schedules in the New Year.

=== 2015 ===
- 4 March – RTÉ launches RTÉ Player International, an online service making the broadcaster's content available to international viewers.
- 30 May – RTÉ announces plans for a €20,000 revamp of its daily Angelus slot, and will invite film makers to suggest new ideas for the 6.00pm broadcast.
- 4 September – Sky and RTÉ announce the signing of an agreement that will make more of RTÉ's content available on Sky's platform. It will also enable the addition of RTÉ One + 1 and RTÉ News Now to the Sky lineup.
- 19 October – RTÉ announces that it will revamp its daily Angelus slot, introducing a new set of short films featuring ordinary Irish people pausing to reflect during the Angelus. There will also be a People's Angelus on Fridays where viewers will be invited to submit their own footage. RTÉ says the new look Angelus will give people "of all faiths and none some quiet space in a hectic day-to-day world".
- 5 November – RTÉ announces RTÉ 1916, a series of programmes and events to mark the centenary of the Easter Uprising, which will feature drama, documentaries and street events about the events of 1916.

=== 2016 ===
- RTÉ announces plans to move children's programming to independent producers. It states this is not a cut to programming, however young people's content sees the funding drop by 25%

=== 2019 ===
- 19 February – Launch of the timeshift channel RTÉ2+1.

== 2020s ==
=== 2020 ===
- 30 March – Launch of RTÉ's Home School Hub and its companion show, Home School Extra; both programmes are created in response to the closure of all schools during the COVID-19 pandemic in the Republic of Ireland.
- 26 June – RTÉ Does Comic Relief is held. The event is broadcast live on RTÉ One and the RTÉ Player for over four hours with over €5 million raised for charities.

=== 2022 ===
- 24 January – RTÉ's National Symphony Orchestra (Ireland) comes under the management of the National Concert Hall
- 13 May – Toy Show The Musical is announced as a major theatre project from RTÉ
- 19 September – RTÉ provides live coverage of the state funeral of Queen Elizabeth II from London, both on television and online.
- 10 December – Toy Show The Musical Premieres at Convention Centre Dublin

=== 2023 ===
- 18 April – Kevin Bakhurst, former director of the UK's media watchdog Ofcom, is appointed as the new Director-General of RTÉ, replacing Dee Forbes, and will take up the position from July.
- 22 June – RTÉ admits that they under-reported paying its top presenter Ryan Tubridy €345,000 more than publicly declared between 2017 and 2022
- 26 June – Outgoing Director General, Dee Forbes, is suspended following the revelations, she then resigns from her position.
- 7 July – Director of Strategy Rory Coveney resigns from his position with immediate effect following a meeting with the incoming Director General Kevin Bakhurst.
- 10 July – The RTÉ Executive Board is replaced by an Interim Leadership Team.
- 11 October – CFO Richard Collins resigns from the organisation.

=== 2025 ===
- 14 July- New look RTÉ Weather goes to broadcast.

== See also ==
- List of television channels available in the Republic of Ireland
- Timeline of commercial television in the Republic of Ireland
