= 2024 in Irish television =

The following is a list of events relating to television in Ireland from 2024.

== Events ==
=== January ===
- 1 January – RTÉ One's New Year's Eve celebrations include a special edition of The Late Late Show at 10.15pm featuring a line up of guests including Midge Ure, Wheatus, The Tumbling Paddies and the RTÉ Concert Orchestra. This is followed by The New Year's Eve Countdown Concert from Dublin Castle featuring Picture This and presented by Anna Geary. The Late Late Show is watched by an audience of 531,000 viewers, while viewers take to social media to comment on the lack of a presenter to ring in the New Year during the coverage of The New Year's Eve Countdown, which instead sees Picture This playing one of their songs up until ten seconds to midnight, followed by an onscreen countdown.
- 5 January –
  - The 2018 film Mamma Mia: Here We Go Again! replaces The Late Late Show at 9.35pm on RTÉ One as the talk show takes a one-week break after airing on New Year's Eve.
  - Racecourse Media Group confirms a three-year extension of its contract with Virgin Media Group to provide coverage of race meetings at 35 UK race courses.
- 7 January – LGBTQ+ and HIV activist Rebecca Tallon De Havilland presents the first edition of Second Chances, a new wellbeing series on Virgin Media One, and becomes the first openly trans Irish person to host their own TV series.
- 8 January – RTÉ One broadcasts Sinéad, a documentary reflecting on the life of singer and musician Sinéad O'Connor and her influence on Irish life. The documentary includes contributions from her fellow musicians, such as David Holmes, Christy Moore, Imelda May, Don Letts and BP Fallon.
- 12 January –
  - Viewing figures for 2023 show that RTÉ had 42 of the year's 50 most watched television programmes. Patrick Kielty's debut on The Late Late Show was the most watched programme of the year, with RTÉ News, the 2023 Rugby World Cup, GAA All-Ireland Finals, Kin, the 2023 Six Nations Championship and Room to Improve among making the top 20.
  - Former US late night talk show presenter Conan O'Brien appears as a guest on The Late Late Show during a visit to Ireland.
- 14 January – Professional dancer Laura Nolan performs two dances on the evening's edition of Dancing with the Stars as she partners jockey Davy Russell as well as actor Shane Quigley Murphy because Russell's usual dance partner, Kylee Vincent, is ill. Karen Byrne also does not perform due to illness, meaning Jason Smyth is partnered with Juliia Vasylenko.
- 24 January – Ahead of the publication of a report the next day into the production Toy Show The Musical, which was a commercial failure during its short run in 2022, it emerges that auditors Grant Thornton found the musical was never formally approved by the RTÉ Board.
- 25 January – Publication of the Grant Thornton report into the 2022 show Toy Show The Musical, which finds that RTÉ's recording of the show's sponsorship money was "not in line with generally accepted accounting practices".
- 26 January –
  - Following the previous day's release of the Grant Thornton report, Minister for Media Catherine Martin says the present RTÉ Board should remain in place "for now" to facilitate the broadcaster's day-to-day operation.
  - RTÉ and Virgin Media Television release schedules for their joint coverage of the 2024 Six Nations Championship, which begins on 2 February.
  - Bambie Thug is chosen to represent Ireland in the Eurovision Song Contest 2024 with the song "Doomsday Blue". The winner is chosen by combined votes of the public vote, an international jury and a national jury on the Late Late Show Eurosong Special.
- 28 January – The Sunday Independent reports that Taoiseach Leo Varadkar favours abolishing the TV licence in favour of government funding for RTÉ as part of a tax-cut package in the Coalition's last budget before the 2024 general election.
- 29 January – RTÉ publishes the names of its top 10 earners for 2022; Ryan Tubridy was the broadcaster's top earner on €515,000, followed by Joe Duffy on €351,000, and Claire Byrne on €320,883.
- 31 January – A report by McCann Fitzgerald, the firm of solicitors appointed by RTÉ to conduct a review of its voluntary redundancy packages finds that there are ten instances that did not satisfy the requirements of a redundancy within the meaning of the Redundancy Payments Acts.

=== February ===
- 1 February – Following the previous day's publication of the McCann Fitzgerald report, Niamh Smyth, the chair of the Oireachtas Media Committee, calls for Dee Forbes, the former Director General of RTÉ, and former RTÉ Chair Moya Doherty, to make themselves available for its next sitting on 14 February.
- 2 February – Virgin Media One airs the opening match of the 2024 Six Nations Championship as Ireland take on France. The match is watched by 1.067 million viewers, while The Late Late Show is seen by an audience of around 100,000.
- 4 February – Figures published by Coimisiún na Meán show that RTÉ received three quarters of viewer and listener complaints during 2023.
- 5 February – It has emerged that Bambi Thug, Ireland's 2024 Eurovision entrant, has featured in an X-rated music video published on several adult websites.
- 9–10 February – RTÉ News provides live coverage of the state funeral of former Taoiseach John Bruton.
- 13 February – Virgin Media secures the broadcast rights to 166 matches from the UEFA Champions League from 2024 to 2024.
- 16 February – Northern Ireland First Minister Michelle O'Neill appears as a guest on RTÉ's The Late Late Show, where she says she wants to attend events important to the unionist community because it is important for politicians to "step outside of our traditional comfort zones".
- 23 February –
  - Siún Ní Raghallaigh resigns as chair of the RTÉ Board after Media Minister Catherine Martin failed to express confidence in her following revelations Martin had been "misinformed" about the approval of an exit package for a former RTÉ executive.
  - Northern Ireland rappers Kneecap make an appearance on The Late Late Show during which they are seen wearing pro-Palestinian badges, while one member removes his jacket to reveal a Palestine sports top. RTÉ subsequently says that the band had agreed not to wear the badges before their appearance after being told doing so would breach the broadcaster's Content Guidelines. The programme is watched by an audience of 416,000, a fall of 21,000 on the previous week, while RTÉ receives two complaints about the band's appearance.

=== March ===
- 9 March – RTÉ2 shows the Six Nations match between Ireland and England, which results in a last-minute win for England, with the game having an average audience of 971,000, peaking at 1.2m at 6.33pm.
- 13 March – Taoiseach Leo Varadkar rules himself out of participating in Dancing with the Stars ahead of the season seven final.
- 17 March – Jason Smyth and professional dance partner Karen Byrne win series seven of Dancing with the Stars.
- 21 March – Simon Harris confirms his intention to run for Fine Gael leader on the evening's edition of the Six One News.
- 26 March – BBC Sport Northern Ireland wins Best Sport Programme at the Royal Television Society Awards for their coverage of the 2023 All-Ireland Senior Football Championship final.
- 29 March – The Late Late Show takes a break for Easter, with the 2015 film Brooklyn airing on RTÉ One in its place.

=== April ===
- 5 April – The Late Late Show returns to RTÉ One with a GAA special to mark the beginning of the 2024 GAA Championship. The programme includes a surprise appearance by Patrick Kielty's former Down GAA minor team teammates.
- 16 April – Broadcaster Paul Byrne launches High Court proceedings against Virgin Media Television over an internal disciplinary procedure brought against him by the company.
- 20 April – The 20th Irish Film & Television Awards are held at the Dublin Royal Convention Centre and hosted by Baz Ashmawy.
- 29 April – RTÉ2 airs the 2024 Ireland's Young Filmmaker of the Year Awards.

=== May ===
- 7 May – Ireland goes through to the 2024 Eurovision Song Contest final with its entry, "Doomsday Blue" by Bambie Thug, the country's first Eurovision final since 2018.
- 10 May – The Rise of Race Hatred, a BBC Spotlight documentary exploring the rise in race hate attacks in Northern Ireland wins the nations and regions category at the Amnesty UK Media Awards.
- 11 May – Ireland's Bambie Thug finishes in sixth place in the Eurovision Song Contest, marking the country's first top-10 finish since 2011.

=== June ===
- 4 June – Paul Byrne resolves his legal action against Virgin Media over its decision to launch internal disciplinary proceedings against him.
- 12 June – The RTÉ Investigates program, RTÉ Investigates: Horses – Making a Killing sets off a Europol probe on the Irish horse meat industry, launching actions by the Oireachtas Joint Committee on Agriculture and the European Commission to investigate.

=== July ===
- 1 July – Steve Carson is to step down as Head of Multi-Platform Commissioning at BBC Scotland in September, in order to take up a senior role at RTÉ.
- 24 July – RTÉ News bulletins are geoblocked in Northern Ireland because of broadcast licencing issues over coverage of the 2024 Summer Olympics.
- 25 July – RTÉ confirms it will resume showing news broadcasts in Northern Ireland, although they will not be live during the Olympics.

=== August ===
- 20 August – The New Zealand Rose, Rose Keely O'Grady wins the 2024 Rose of Tralee which was shown on RTÉ 1 over two nights.

=== October ===
- 20 October – Sinn Féin urges RTÉ to apologise after Patrick Kielty used the term "the Sinn Féin traitors" during the 18 October broadcast of The Late Late Show.
- 28 October – The broadcast of Series 12 of Ireland's Fittest Family is to be postponed following the death of contestant Cillian Flaherty.

=== November ===
- 14 November – The 9th Royal Television Society Northern Ireland Awards take place at Titanic Belfast.

=== December ===
- 6 December – RTÉ2's programming block TRTÉ is rebranded to RTÉ Kids.
- 31 December – RTÉ One's New Year's Eve celebrations include a special edition of The Late Late Show at 10.20pm presented by Patrick Kielty with performances from the RTÉ Concert Orchestra.

== Debuts ==
- 8 January – Sinéad on RTÉ One
- 9 January – Inside Penneys on RTÉ One
- 10 April –
  - Louise Lives Large on RTÉ2
  - Is Ireland Full? on Virgin Media One
- 15 April – Man Up on RTÉ2

== Ongoing television programmes ==
=== 1960s ===
- RTÉ News: Nine O'Clock (1961–present)
- RTÉ News: Six One (1962–present)
- The Late Late Show (1962–present)

=== 1970s ===
- The Late Late Toy Show (1975–present)
- The Sunday Game (1979–present)

=== 1980s ===
- Fair City (1989–present)
- RTÉ News: One O'Clock (1989–present)

=== 1990s ===
- Would You Believe (1990s–present)
- Winning Streak (1990–present)
- Prime Time (1992–present)
- Nuacht RTÉ (1995–present)
- Nuacht TG4 (1996–present)
- Reeling In the Years (1999–present)
- Ros na Rún (1996–present)
- Virgin Media News (1998–present)
- Ireland AM (1999–present)
- Telly Bingo (1999–present)

=== 2000s ===
- Nationwide (2000–present)
- Virgin Media News (2001–present) – now known as the 5.30
- Against the Head (2003–present)
- news2day (2003–present)
- Other Voices (2003–present)
- The Week in Politics (2006–present)
- At Your Service (2008–present)
- Operation Transformation (2008–present)
- Two Tube (2009–present)

=== 2010s ===
- Room to Improve (2007–present)
- Jack Taylor (2010–present)
- Mrs. Brown's Boys (2011–present)
- MasterChef Ireland (2011–present)
- Today (2012–present)
- The Works (2012–present)
- Second Captains Live (2013–present)
- Ireland's Fittest Family (2014–present)
- The Restaurant (2015–present)
- Red Rock (2015–present)
- First Dates (2016–present)
- Dancing with the Stars (2017–2020, 2022–present)
- The Tommy Tiernan Show (2017–present)

=== 2020s ===
- The Style Counsellors (2020–present)
- The 2 Johnnies' Late Night Lock In (2023–present)

== Deaths ==
- 6 March – Nick Sheridan, 32, journalist and television presenter (News2day, Reporting Scotland, The Nine)
- 11 March – Charlie Bird, 74, broadcast journalist (RTÉ News).
- 14 April – Larry Masterson, 74, television producer.
- 17 April – Alf McCarthy, 73, broadcaster (RTÉ) and actor (Strength and Honour).
- 25 June –
  - Tommie Gorman, 68, journalist.
  - Mícheál Ó Muircheartaigh, 93, Gaelic games commentator.
