= Robert Shortt =

Irish journalist

- Born: 1971 (age 54–55); Bray, County Wicklow, Ireland
- Education: University College Dublin
- Occupations: Former journalist, current affairs broadcaster
- Years active: 1998–present
- Employer: RTÉ
- Notable credit(s): RTÉ News at One; Morning Ireland; Prime Time
- Title: Company Secretary
- Predecessor: Paula Mullaly
- Board member of: RTÉ (2018 - 2023)

Robert Shortt (born 1971) is an Irish former journalist with RTÉ, Ireland's national radio and television station, where he currently serves as its company secretary since January 2024. He previously held a number of roles with RTÉ News, most recently as Economics Correspondent from 2019 to 2024. As a current affairs broadcaster, he worked as a reporter with RTÉ's flagship programme Prime Time.

== Career ==
Shortt began his journalistic career with Nihon Keizai Shimbun and BBC News before joining RTÉ in 1998, working on radio as a reporter on RTÉ News at One before being appointed RTÉ News Business Correspondent in 2001. In that role he created and co-presented The Business Programme on RTÉ Radio 1. From 2005 to 2008, Shortt was based in the United States as RTÉ's Washington correspondent. He covered stories such as Hurricane Katrina and the 2008 United States presidential election. Since returning to Ireland, he worked as a reporter on Prime Time, winning a Smurfit Business Journalist Award for his documentary on Ireland's economic collapse.

In May 2018, Shortt was appointed to the RTÉ Board as the staff representative. Much of his period on the board came under scrutiny due to the governance of the company under then Director General Dee Forbes and Chair Moya Doherty.

In January 2024, Shortt resigned his role in the RTÉ newsroom and his position as staff representative on the RTÉ Board to take up the position of RTÉ company secretary, responsible for advising the board on governance, procedures and ensuring that proper rules and procedures at board and sub-committee meetings are followed.

Media offices
Preceded by Carole Coleman	RTÉ News Washington Correspondent; 2005-2008	Succeeded by Charlie Bird
