= National Youth Organisation =

National Youth Organisation may refer to:

- National Youth Organisation (Greece), a youth organisation active in the Kingdom of Greece during the authoritarian Metaxas regime
- National Youth Organisation (Grenada), a defunct youth organisation in Grenada
- National Youth Organisation (Ireland), a youth organization currently active in the Republic of Ireland
- National Youth Organisation (Pakistan), a youth organization active in Pakistan associated with Awami National Party
