= RTÉ secret payment scandal =

Scandal at Ireland's main public service broadcaster

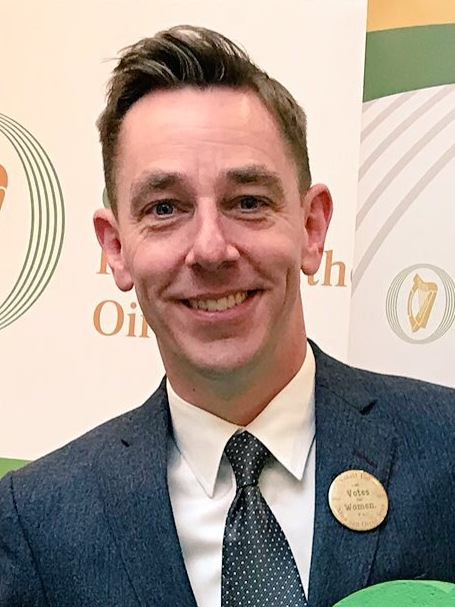
Tubridy in 2018

The RTÉ secret payment scandal relates to events from late June 2023 onwards when Ireland's main public service broadcaster RTÉ first disclosed previously unknown arrangements concerning a leading presenter's pay, and in subsequent discussions, revelations about corporate entertainment for advertising clients, management numbers and high pay, and executive exit packages.

On 22 June 2023, RTÉ announced that between 2017 and 2022 it had paid €345,000 more than had been previously disclosed to the TV and radio presenter Ryan Tubridy, whose pay was already known to be more than that of anyone else at RTÉ. The celebrity talent agent Noel Kelly of NK Management negotiated the pay supplements and played a central role in funnelling them to Tubridy. The extra payments brought Tubridy's annual earnings over the €500,000 threshold each year during that time period, while allowing RTÉ to declare publicly that Tubridy was earning less than this. For the years 2020 to 2022, the extra payments were performed using a UK-based "barter account" mechanism, operated with a barter agency, Astus.

The Director General of RTÉ Dee Forbes was asked to resign by RTÉ Board chairperson Siún Ní Raghallaigh. Forbes initially declined to do so, but was later suspended, and eventually resigned on 26 June 2023. Members of the RTÉ Executive Board and RTÉ Board were summoned to the Oireachtas Joint Committee on Tourism, Culture, Arts, Sport and Media and the Oireachtas Public Accounts Committee (PAC) on numerous occasions to explain what had happened. In late June 2023, more information on the culture within RTÉ entered the public domain, specifically what else it used the barter account for, including €111,000 on trips to Japan and €260,000 on a UEFA Champions League trip. On 4 July 2023, two additional barter account operators were disclosed – along with Astus (the first disclosed), these were Active and Miroma. The controversy turned to exit payments for senior executives in early 2024 which led to the resignation of Ní Raghallaigh.

According to The Irish Times's political editor Pat Leahy, "The story of RTÉ's agonies is an important one for politics, society and media". Ironically, the scandal led large numbers of the Irish public to tune in to RTÉ News updates to follow the story as it developed. RTÉ is using the public relations firm Q4, co-founded by former Fianna Fáil general secretary Martin Mackin, who was briefly appointed to Seanad Éireann in 2002.

== Background ==
An independent legal review in 2018 found that a number of workers at RTÉ were misclassified in false self-employment contracts, in breach of guidelines on employment status, meaning that these workers were unable to access benefits of regular employment such as maternity leave, pensions, pay for illness and permission to apply for promotional posts.

In late 2019, the Government of Ireland and RTÉ held talks over the broadcaster's series of annual budgetary deficits. In December 2019, the government agreed to increase RTÉ's funding by a further €9 million per year. Budgetary deficits remained, leading RTÉ to make more cuts to its services. RTÉ froze pay rises for its ordinary workers in March 2020, which an industrial relations tribunal later that year found to be wrong. In October 2020, RTÉ Director General Dee Forbes told employees that the broadcaster would be looking for more redundancies in January 2021, as it "must now begin planning a series of initiatives" to deal with a "persistent gap" between its income and expenses. RTÉ and the government agreed this plan to cut €60 million at RTÉ between 2020 and 2023.

In December 2019, Communications Minister Richard Bruton announced that RTÉ would be funded to the tune of €50 million in the following five years.

The Public Accounts Committee (PAC) suggested in July 2022 that RTÉ was relying too much on state funding, as its commercial revenue declined. There were also delays to deciding how to change the TV licence system, with licence evasion having risen to 15.8% in 2020.

RTÉ Director of Strategy Rory Coveney (a brother of Fine Gael minister Simon Coveney) told the Oireachtas Joint Committee on Tourism, Culture, Arts, Sport and Media on 18 January 2023 that there was no sustainable future for RTÉ without changing the ways in which RTÉ was provided with public funding, and hinted at "implications for cost and human resources". Coveney also suggested that the recent stage show Toy Show The Musical may return "in some form" and be better suited to staging before The Late Late Toy Show.

== Timeline ==
On 15 February 2023, RTÉ released the figures for its top ten earners of 2021, placing on record the figure of €440,000 it wrongly claims Tubridy earned in 2021 and allowing other reports to erroneously claim Tubridy's salary decreased by €26,250 to €466,250 from 2020.

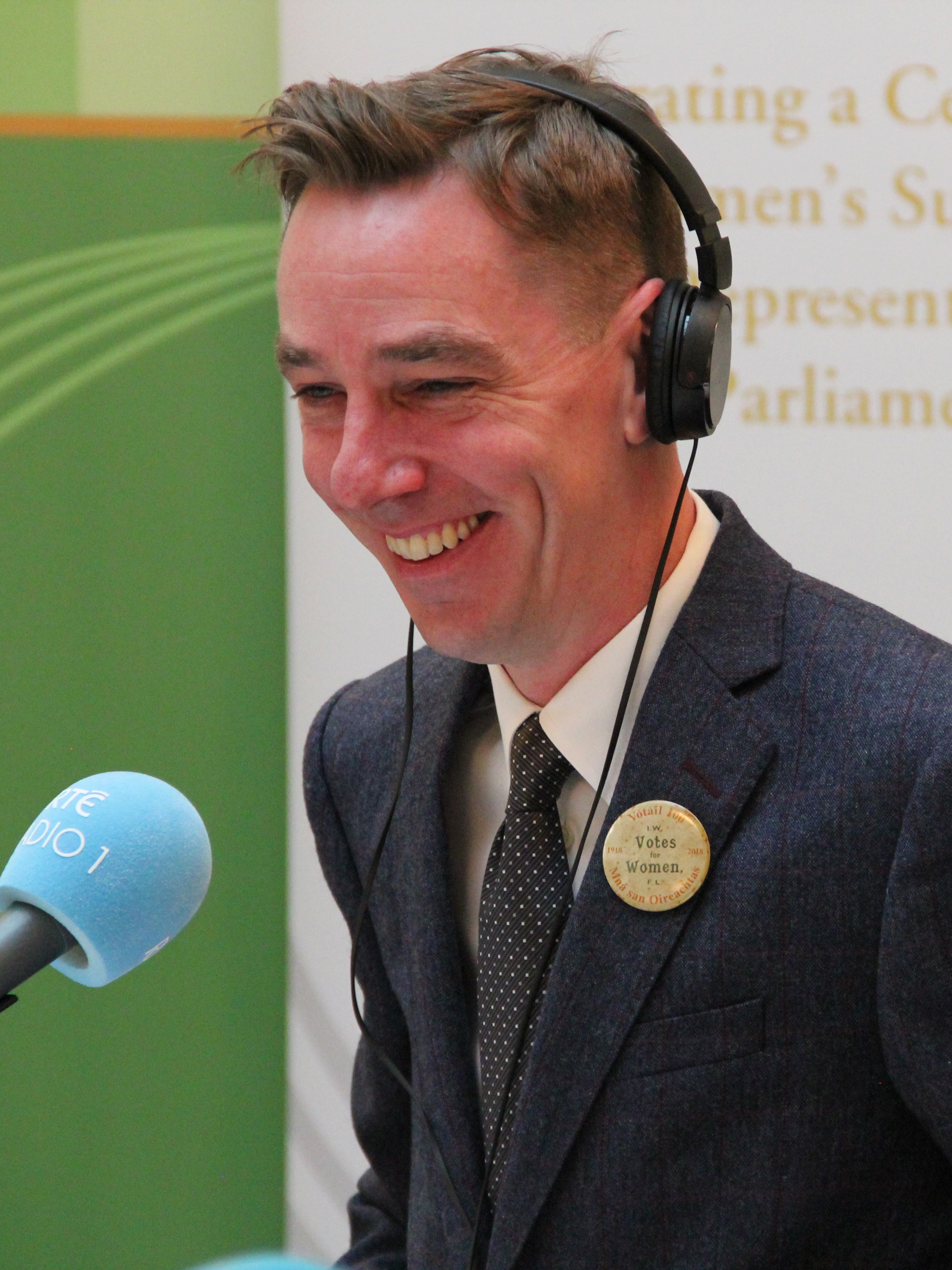
Tubridy was taken off air for "editorial reasons" in the wake of the scandal.

RTÉ admitted on 22 June that "Tubridy received two payments of €75,000 (totalling €150,000), each in 2022 (being a payment for 2021 and a payment for 2022). It was these payments that prompted the review by Grant Thornton. These payments were recorded in an RTÉ "Barter Account" in 2022 at a value of €115,380 each". RTÉ Board chairperson Siún Ní Raghallaigh confirmed in an interview on RTÉ News: Six One that Tubridy would not be on air the following morning (a Friday, his last show of the week).

The RTÉ Board released a statement the next day announcing that Director General Dee Forbes was suspended on Wednesday 21 June 2023. However, Ní Raghallaigh failed to mention this the previous evening during her interview on RTÉ News: Six One.

On 25 June, The Sunday Times reported on how RTÉ arranged for Tubridy's salary top-ups to be paid, with RTÉ alleged to have told Tubridy's agent Noel Kelly to send invoices to a British barter agency called Astus. RTÉ, reports The Sunday Times, arranged for invoices, which were labelled as "consultancy services". Astus then settled them on RTÉ's behalf.

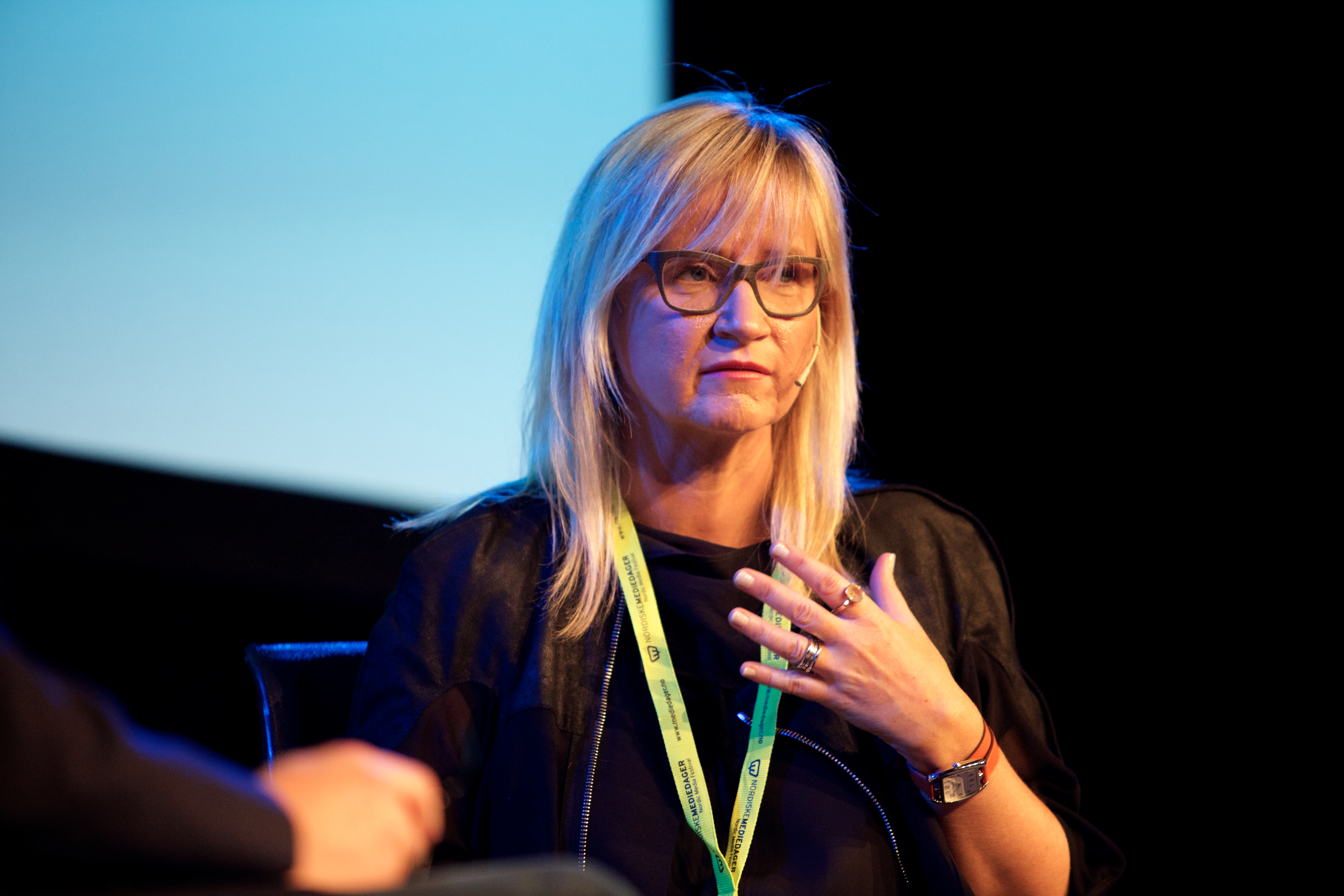
The scandal claimed Dee Forbes, who was approaching the end of her term as Director General of RTÉ.

In an early morning statement the next day, RTÉ Director General Dee Forbes announced her resignation with immediate effect. It was also confirmed that Forbes had resigned her position on the board of GAAGO, the subscription-based sports channel for Gaelic games which she was heavily involved in establishing. She later announced she would not be attending Oireachtas committee meetings later in the week for health reasons.

On 27 June, RTÉ Acting Director General Adrian Lynch released a nine-page statement, alongside the Grant Thornton report, stating that no member of the Executive Board other than director general Forbes could have known figures publicly declared for Tubridy could have been wrong and that external legal advice found there was "no illegality" and "payments were made pursuant to an agreed contract", adding that while RTÉ Director of Content Jim Jennings signed off on the payments deal, he was "not aware" the broadcaster was "underwriting" any payments that were now under scrutiny and that there was "no finding of wrongdoing" against Tubridy or the commercial partner involved in what happened.

Members of the RTÉ Executive Board and RTÉ Board appeared before the Oireachtas Joint Committee on Tourism, Culture, Arts, Sport and Media on 28 June. RTÉ Board chair Siún Ní Raghallaigh stated that she asked Director General Dee Forbes to resign but that this request was not accepted at the time. Ní Raghallaigh also did not tell Minister Catherine Martin of this during their meeting two days before. It was also revealed that Tubridy was due a €120,000 "loyalty bonus" which for some "unexplained reason" was credited against his earnings between 2017 and 2019. It was also reported that Tubridy insisted RTÉ's claim that he was out of contract was inaccurate.

RTÉ executives appeared before the Public Accounts Committee (PAC) the next day. RTÉ Chief Financial Officer Richard Collins refused to say what he was earning, then admitted to a base salary of €200,000 with an additional €25,000 car allowance. Collins also admitted that "maybe the taxpayer was defrauded", while details of the RTÉ barter account's use were volunteered: €111,000 spent on trips to Japan, €138,000 worth of tickets to rugby matches; €26,000 for one football match in 2019. RTÉ Board chair Siún Ní Raghallaigh stated the €340,000 top-ups to Tubridy salary was an "act designed to deceive". The term "slush fund" was used by former board chair Moya Doherty to describe the RTÉ barter account. On the same day, Center Parcs said it would not be renewing its sponsorship deal with The Ryan Tubridy Show (worth €295,000 since November 2022) and also said it might pull out before that time, to prevent its name being tainted by association with RTÉ's secret payments to Tubridy.

On 4 July, Grant Thornton found two more barter accounts at RTÉ, of the type at the centre of secret payments to Tubridy. The two additional barter accounts were with agencies named Active and Miroma (in addition to Astus, the first announced). Past and present members of the RTÉ Executive Board met the Oireachtas Committee on Media the following afternoon for a second consecutive Wednesday. New documents given to the committee showed that RTÉ had used its barter accounts to spend €1.6 million on client entertainment and corporate hospitality over the previous 10 years, paying out hundreds of thousands of euro for alcohol, Ireland jerseys, golf outings, cinema screenings, balloons, lavish hotel stays, client dinners in top restaurants and dozens of match and concert tickets, as well as nearly €5,000 on 200 pairs of flip flops for a summer party. Documentation also confirmed losses at Toy Show The Musical reached €2.2 million, with just 11,044 tickets being sold for the shows, meanwhile Tubridy and his agent Noel Kelly offered to meet with the two committees.

The next day, RTÉ's Gaelic Games Correspondent Marty Morrissey apologised for an "error of judgement" after he revealed himself as the RTÉ staff member who had a loan of a car from Renault for five years.

On the eve of Kevin Bakhurst becoming Director General, Rory Coveney resigned from RTÉ and his role as RTÉ Director of Strategy with immediate effect believing that "the tough job ahead of him would be made somewhat easier if he had a fresh lead team". In an email to staff the following morning, Bakhurst stood down the Executive Board and replaced it with an interim leadership team, meanwhile RTÉ Director of Commercial Geraldine O'Leary announced her early retirement with immediate effect.

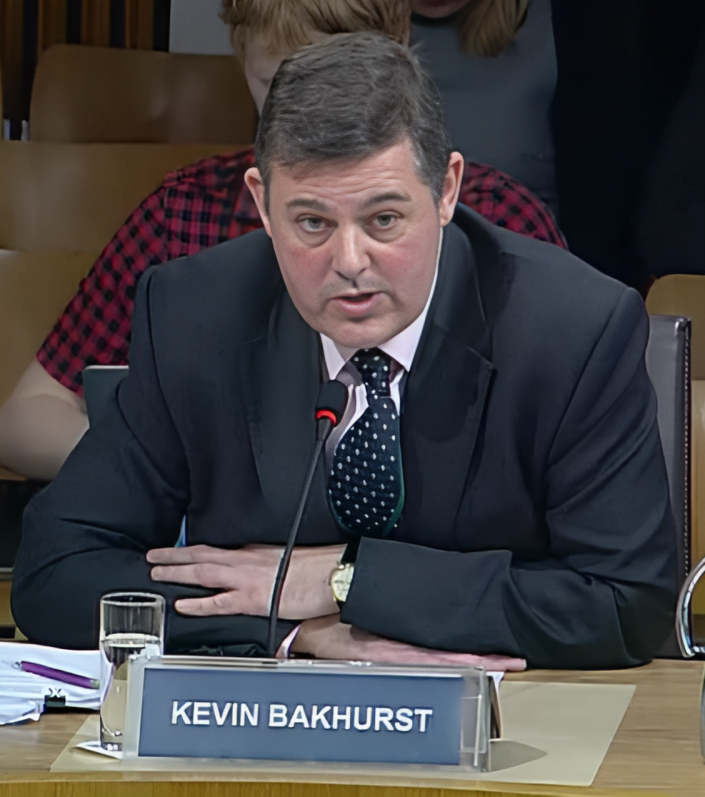
Bakhurst said a new permanent leadership team would be appointed "in due course".

On 11 July, Ryan Tubridy and his agent Noel Kelly appeared before two Oireachtas committee meetings, which heard that Tubridy had endured a "tortuous", "chaotic" and "destructive" three weeks during which his name and reputation were "sullied", that he had become "the face of a national scandal; accused of being complicit, deceitful and dishonest" and blamed RTÉ with creating a "fog of confusion over what I was paid and when I was paid, what I knew, and when I knew".

On 17 August, it was confirmed that Tubridy would not return to his presenting role in RTÉ after negotiations with Bakhurst collapsed.

On 14 February 2024, a hearing of the Oireachtas Media Committee heard that Toy Show The Musical had not gone to the audit and risk committee and that former Director General Dee Forbes and former Director of Strategy Rory Coveney "deliberately circumvented" established oversights in relation to the musical.

== Reactions ==
On 23 June, the day after RTÉ's admission, the National Union of Journalists (NUJ) held an emergency meeting at RTÉ headquarters, which it had called for the day before.

Soon after the news broke, presenters Claire Byrne, Joe Duffy and Miriam O'Callaghan all confirmed that their most recently published salaries were correct.

On 27 June, around 200 journalists, reporters and correspondents working for RTÉ represented by SIPTU and the NUJ held a protest outside RTÉ headquarters in Donnybrook to speak of their hurt, disappointment and anger at the way a small number of managers had betrayed and badly damaged the organisation and those who worked for it. Those who protested included RTÉ News's Crime Correspondent Paul Reynolds, Legal Affairs Correspondent Orla O'Donnell, Political Correspondent Paul Cunningham and Midlands Correspondent Sinéad Hussey, while other members of staff protested at RTÉ's regional offices, with Northern Editor Vincent Kearney in Belfast and Regional Reporter Teresa Mannion in Galway.

On 29 June, Taoiseach Leo Varadkar interrupted an EU leaders summit in Brussels to draw attention to the "unusual, clandestine payments in RTÉ", stating: "I don't think we can rule out the fact that it's not just a case of irregular payments — and that some of these payments may have been on the wrong side of the law".

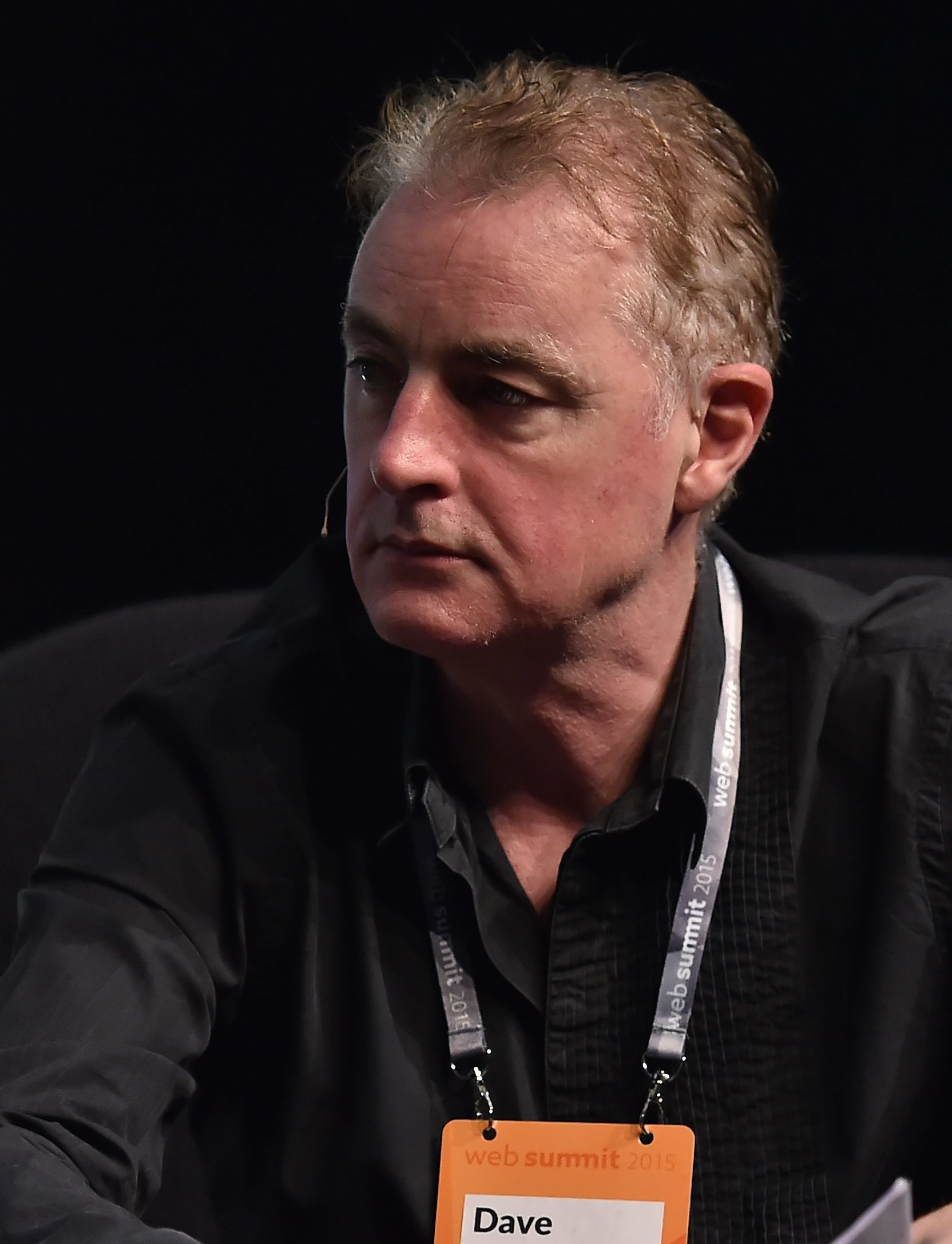
Dave Fanning, another client of Tubridy's agent Noel Kelly, invoked Nazi Germany as a comparison with the investigations into what RTÉ had been doing with public money.

On 11 July, RTÉ presenter Dave Fanning, another client of Tubridy's agent Noel Kelly, invoked Nazi Germany as a comparison with the investigations into what RTÉ had been doing with public money. Two days later, this was raised at the Public Accounts Committee (PAC), where Fanning's reference to a "nonsensical Oireachtas Nuremberg trial" was put to newly appointed RTÉ Director General Kevin Bakhurst, who was asked "how this is appropriate... A person who is paid by the taxpayer – through his agent [Noel Kelly] – on RTÉ saying, effectively, what the Public Accounts Committee are doing..." Bakhurst responded by stating that Fanning's remarks were "not appropriate".

Around 100 RTÉ staff members and union representatives staged another protest at RTÉ headquarters on 12 July to call on the Government to properly fund public service broadcasting. Demonstrations were also held at RTÉ regional offices, including in Cork, where staff members marched with placards.

== Involvement of Renault Ireland ==
The secret payments to Tubridy were effectively routed through Renault Ireland, a major advertiser on RTÉ, and a frequent sponsor of the Late Late Show. Following the three-way deal, in late July 2020 Renault Ireland paid €75,000 to NK Management for Tubridy’s benefit, on foot of an invoice for “Bespoke Partnership between Renault and Ryan Tubridy”. Within days, RTÉ issued a credit note for €75,000 to Renault Ireland, and there is no evidence that the ‘personal appearances’ by Tubridy for Renault mentioned on the invoice ever happened, making the deal revenue-neutral for Renault.

In 2021 and 2022 the payments for Tubridy were made directly from RTÉ to NK Management, as per their ‘underwriting’ of the deal, where RTÉ were liable to make the payment if Renault Ireland did not. During his appearance before the Oireachtas Public Accounts Committee, Tubridy said he believed that Renault Ireland were the ultimate source of the funds.

I was under the understanding that the payments had come from Renault, a very successful commercial company, so I did not feel that it was an RTÉ situation.

Tubridy and Kelly were challenged in this statement by committee members who pointed out that they had complied with RTÉ requests to omit details from invoices, in an apparent effort to disguise the true reason for the payments. The payments were falsely described in RTÉ accounts as ‘consultancy fees’. Commentators have drawn attention to how Renault Ireland facilitated this transaction for no apparent benefit to itself, and on other occasions supplied RTÉ staff members with the free use of cars for years on end, and said that it puts RTÉ in a position to of obligation to the giant motor manufacturer, and linked it to RTÉ’s coverage of climate change and road deaths, which they viewed as overly sympathetic to the motor industry.

== Grant Thornton report, "Talent" and Noel Kelly ==
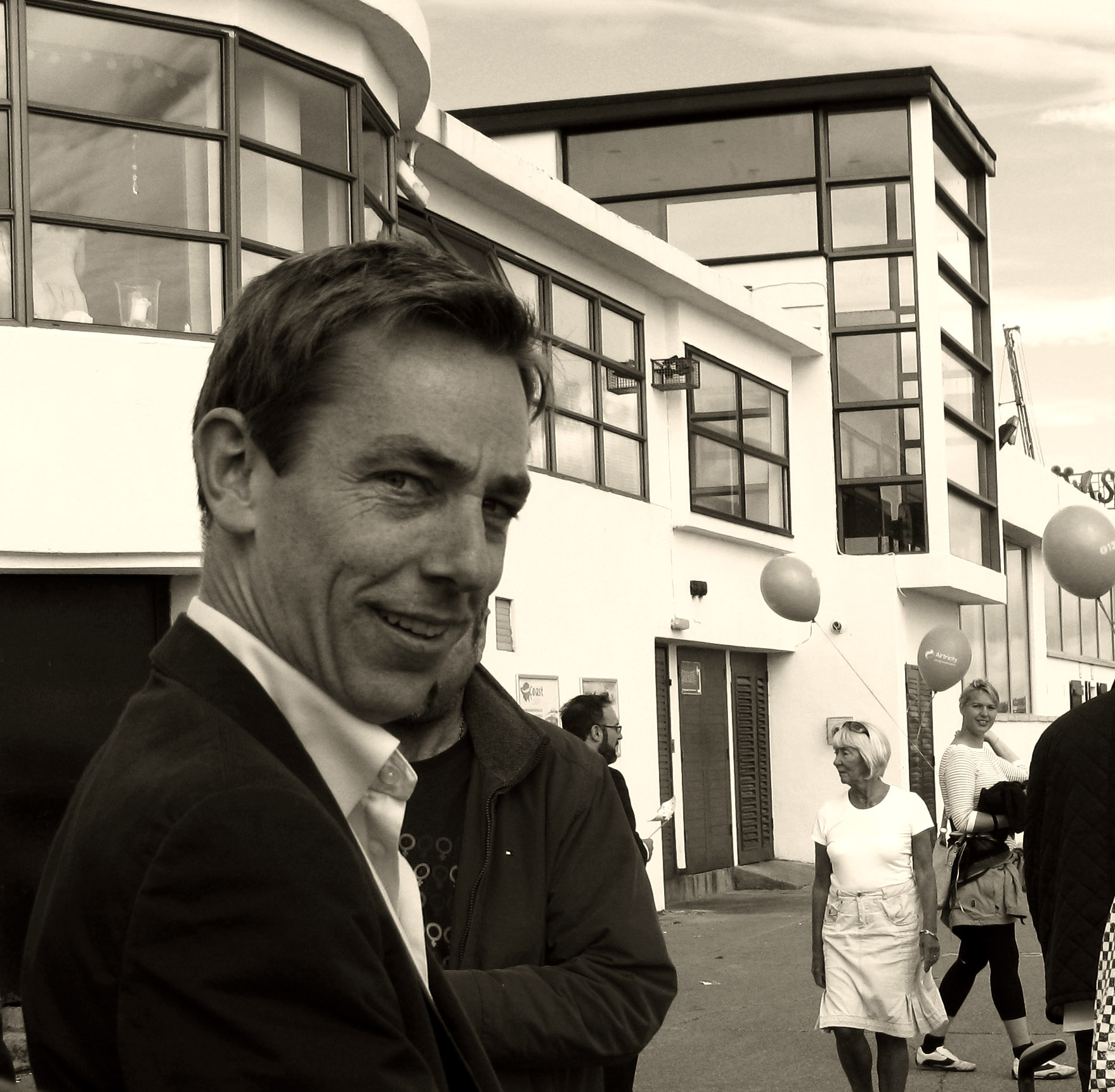
Tubridy is referred to as "The Talent" in the Grant Thornton report released by the RTÉ Board on 26 June 2023.

In the Grant Thornton report, which the RTÉ Board released on 26 June 2023, Ryan Tubridy is referred to as "The Talent". Tubridy often spoke in public about cuts to his pay, including in 2020 during the COVID-19 pandemic. In 2019, he stated: "I've taken a pay cut before, I took over 30pc the last time and they've asked for more, which would bring it up to about 45pc or thereabouts since I took the Late Late Show [in 2009]... And when it comes to this sort of issue that's not something I've been found wanting in, and that continues to be the case". However, in early 2009, Tubridy refused to take a pay-cut (even when colleagues such as Pat Kenny and Marian Finucane agreed to salary cuts), and he attracted criticism for this decision. RTÉ Board chair Siún Ní Raghallaigh, near the conclusion of her opening statement to the Public Accounts Committee on 26 June 2023, commented on the term "talent" as used within RTÉ: "Finally, can I say something about the use of the word 'talent'. Words matter and the term, as it is currently used, reinforces a 'them and us' culture in RTÉ. It implies some have greater worth than others. The first step in cultural change is to consign this term to the dustbin". Ní Raghallaigh did not, however, suggest she would "consign this term to the dustbin".

In the Grant Thornton report, Noel Kelly is referred to as "The Talent's Agent". Kelly, who maintains a low profile, runs NK Management, and has been a controversial figure since at least 2011, when he claimed that some of his clients might not be able to afford a second car if RTÉ reduced their wages. In 2009, he was an agent to both Gerry Ryan and Tubridy as they competed to succeed Pat Kenny as presenter of The Late Late Show. Tubridy would offer Noel Kelly's name to his guests: the actress and food writer Holly White said Tubridy gave her Noel Kelly's name after an appearance on his radio show. Ryan Tubridy has referred to Kelly as his Consigliere. One senior broadcasting executive expressed reservations to The Irish Times about Kelly's ability to attract other presenters following the secret payments scandal: "Because [Noel Kelly] has really destroyed Ryan Tubridy's career, by being too smart. Ryan Tubridy had an option to say no, he is not a child. But Ryan Tubridy's career has been destroyed and Noel Kelly is right in the middle of it and there is no other way to twist and turn that".

According to The Irish Times, Kelly is seen by some as more powerful than the RTÉ Director General and is "widely believed" to offer the media negative stories about RTÉ presenters who are not his clients and whom he perceives as competitors who might get a job ahead of his client. He is known for using "strong language and pointed, personalised criticisms". At that time, Noel Kelly had 46 clients in his "celebrity portfolio", including RTÉ's Tubridy, Joe Duffy, Gráinne Seoige, Claire Byrne, Dave Fanning, Virgin Media's Sinéad Desmond, Martin King and Karen Koster, as well as Bernard Dunne and Patrick Bergin. Kelly and NK Management are also involved in activities in the UK, with clients including Craig Doyle, Diarmuid Gavin and Erin O'Connor.

== Mazars report ==
A 24-page interim report published by forensic accountants Mazars on 25 August 2023 found that RTÉ did not appear to have a "formally approved policy and procedure in place" for purchases made through the barter account. Mazars were unable to identify any benefit to RTÉ in exercising the option to make purchases through barter media agencies "rather than cashing out on the available trade credit balance". It was revealed that of the €7.4 million in advertising revenue generated through the barter account, €1.2 million was spent on goods and services which were "outside of RTÉ's standard purchasing and procurement processes", and so internal controls and approvals processes were not followed.

== Management pay and exit packages ==
In documents supplied to the Oireachtas committees studying the Tubridy matter, RTÉ listed the earnings of its 100 highest-paid employees and contractors. All were on base salaries in excess of €116,000, and 84 were employees. Including the members of the RTÉ Executive Board, 69 were management, only 31 being presenters and other technical or non-managerial staff. The Director General was paid €225,000 in 2021, along with a car allowance of €25,000 and pension contributions of €56,000, for a total package of €306,000, while the Chief Financial Officer said he earned around €200,000 plus car allowance of around €25,000 (any pension element was not disclosed).

The total staff of the broadcaster is over 1,800, plus contractors. Of these, in 2022, 119 employees had basic pay of over 100,000, 22 of those having salaries of €150,000–€250,000. 179 staff had salaries of €80,000–€100,000, 550 between €60,000 and €80,000, and 740 between €40,000 and €60,000.

In discussing past and recent executive exits from the company, it further emerged that aside from the high level of management posts, and their salary levels, there were voluntary exit schemes offered by RTÉ's Human Resources function, under which over €2.3 million was paid out to a number of departing figures, with at least one payment rumoured to be on the order of €400,000. The new Director General announced a review of these packages.

On 14 February 2024, Director General Kevin Bakhurst confirmed at an Oireachtas Media Committee hearing that former RTÉ Chief Financial Officer Breda O'Keeffe was paid €450,000 when she left the organisation.

Speaking on RTÉ's Prime Time on 22 February, Minister for Media Catherine Martin said she was "deeply disappointed" to learn that the RTÉ Board had approved an exit package for former chief financial officer Richard Collins despite assurances that the board had no role in signing off on exit packages for senior executives. She refused to express confidence in Siún Ní Raghallaigh, chair of the RTÉ Board. Early the next morning, Ní Raghallaigh resigned as chair of the RTÉ Board, saying it was "abundantly clear" she no longer had the confidence of Minister Martin. Ní Raghallaigh later broke her silence and hit back at Minister Martin around what she described as her "enforced dismissal" designed to "traduce" her reputation.
