= Joe Barry (director-general) =

Irish television executive (1932–2022)

Director-General of RTÉ
- In office 20 November 1992 – 18 April 1997
- Preceded by: Vincent Finn
- Succeeded by: Bob Collins

Personal details
- Born: Denis Joseph Barry; 18 April 1932 Dunmanway, County Cork, Ireland
- Died: 6 July 2022 (aged 90) Blackrock, Dublin, Ireland
- Spouse: Aileen McGahey
- Children: 4

Denis Joseph Barry (18 April 1932 – 6 July 2022) was an Irish technician and television executive. He was Director-General of national broadcaster RTÉ from 1992 to 1997.

== Early life ==
Barry was born in Dunmanway, County Cork. His father, Eugene, was a professional tailor while his mother, Catherine, came from a farming family. Barry's father died when he was four.

== Career ==
Barry left school at 16 or 17. He got a job as a technician in Cork in 1956 with the Department of Posts and Telegraphs, which oversaw Radio Éireann. He later transferred to Dublin and continued working as a technician for the newly created Raidió Teilifís Éireann. Barry worked as part of the outside broadcast unit and was involved in national and international events, such as All-Ireland finals, Olympic Games coverage and the Visit by Pope John Paul II to Ireland. He worked as Head of Planning and Control, Head of Outside Broadcasts and eventually Director of Production Facilities (Television). During Barry's five-year term as Director-General, RTÉ hosted the Eurovision Song Contest four times. He also oversaw the launch of Teilifís na Gaeilge (now TG4) in October 1996 as well as RTÉ's online services in the same year and the opening of new studios in Cork.

== Later life and death ==
Barry stepped down as Director-General and retired from RTÉ on his 65th birthday in April 1997. In retirement, he was appointed to the RTÉ Authority in 2000 and served for four years, during which time he became its chairperson. He also served on the board of the National Gallery of Ireland.

Barry died on 6 July 2022, aged 90.
