= Committee of Privileges (disambiguation) =

Committee of Privileges may refer to:

- The Commons Select Committee of Privileges of the House of Commons in the Parliament of the United Kingdom
  - The Standards and Privileges Committee, predecessor of the above
- The Committee for Privileges and Conduct of the House of Lords in the Parliament of the United Kingdom
- The United States Senate Committee on Privileges and Elections, a committee of the US Senate, 1871–1947
- Committee of Privileges (Ireland), to resolve disputes on whether a bill is a money bill

== See also ==
- Parliamentary privilege
