= Aidan McGrath =

Irish activist

Aidan McGrath is an Irish youth activist. He is the former President of Ireland's National Youth Organisation. He was twice elected to represent his Constituency of Fingal in Ireland's National Youth Parliament, Dáil na nÓg, and was chairperson of both the Swords Youth Council and the Fingal Comhairle na nÓg. McGrath is a member of both Fingal County Council's General Strategic Policy Committee and the Planning Strategic Policy Committee. In 2010 he was named one of the top Youth Leaders in both the Republic of Ireland and Northern Ireland by the National Association of Principals and Deputy Principals and the General Teaching Council for Northern Ireland. McGrath continues to maintain a public profile in the area of political activism, and in 2012 he was named one of the top ten outstanding young people of Ireland by Junior Chamber International.

== Education and childhood ==
McGrath was born in Dublin and educated in Fingal Community College, Swords.

== Public appearances ==
McGrath appeared on Today FM's the Last Word to discuss issues that concerned young people, in particular, the reintroduction of Third Level College Fees. He also appeared on Ireland's National Broadcaster RTÉ (Radío Telifís Éireann) to discuss issues that concerned young people in his capacity as President of the National Youth Organisation. He has appeared on other national radio stations such as FM104 and PhantomFm, again highlighting the views and opinions of young people, in particular, students.

== Activism ==
McGrath, on behalf of the Northern Ireland Assembly contributed advice to a forum held in Stormont, Belfast, which examined the setting up of a Youth Parliament for Northern Ireland's young people. He publicly addressed Northern Irish youth representatives from various communities and provided guidance on the issue.

He was active in his own community as Chairperson of the Swords Youth Council and worked alongside Local Councillors, Clare Daly, Tom Kelleher, Anne Devitt and Darragh Butler in an effort to secure funding or a facility for a Youth Café for the young people of Swords. Their efforts received local media attention and support from the Community. He was later appointed to Fingal County Council's General Strategic Policy Committee.

McGrath, as part of the steering committee of Ireland's National Youth Parliament, met with Mary Harney, TD and former Minister for Health in an effort to have the cervical cancer vaccine made available free of charge for all 12–18-year-old girls. On Saturday, 16 January, Mary Harney announced that the plan would be implemented.

== Awards ==
In March 2010, McGrath was announced one of the Top Youth Leaders in the Republic of Ireland by the National Association of Principals and Deputy Principals and Pramerica Systems Ireland. He was nominated for the award for developing links between local government and young people, ensuring young people were involved in the decision-making process.

In May 2012 he was nominated by JCI Fingal President Joanna Michalski to be named one of the top ten outstanding young people of Ireland. He was youngest nominee of 2012, and attended a ceremony in Cloonacauneen Castle, Galway to accept the award.
