= Joe Duffy =

Irish radio and TV presenter (born 1956)

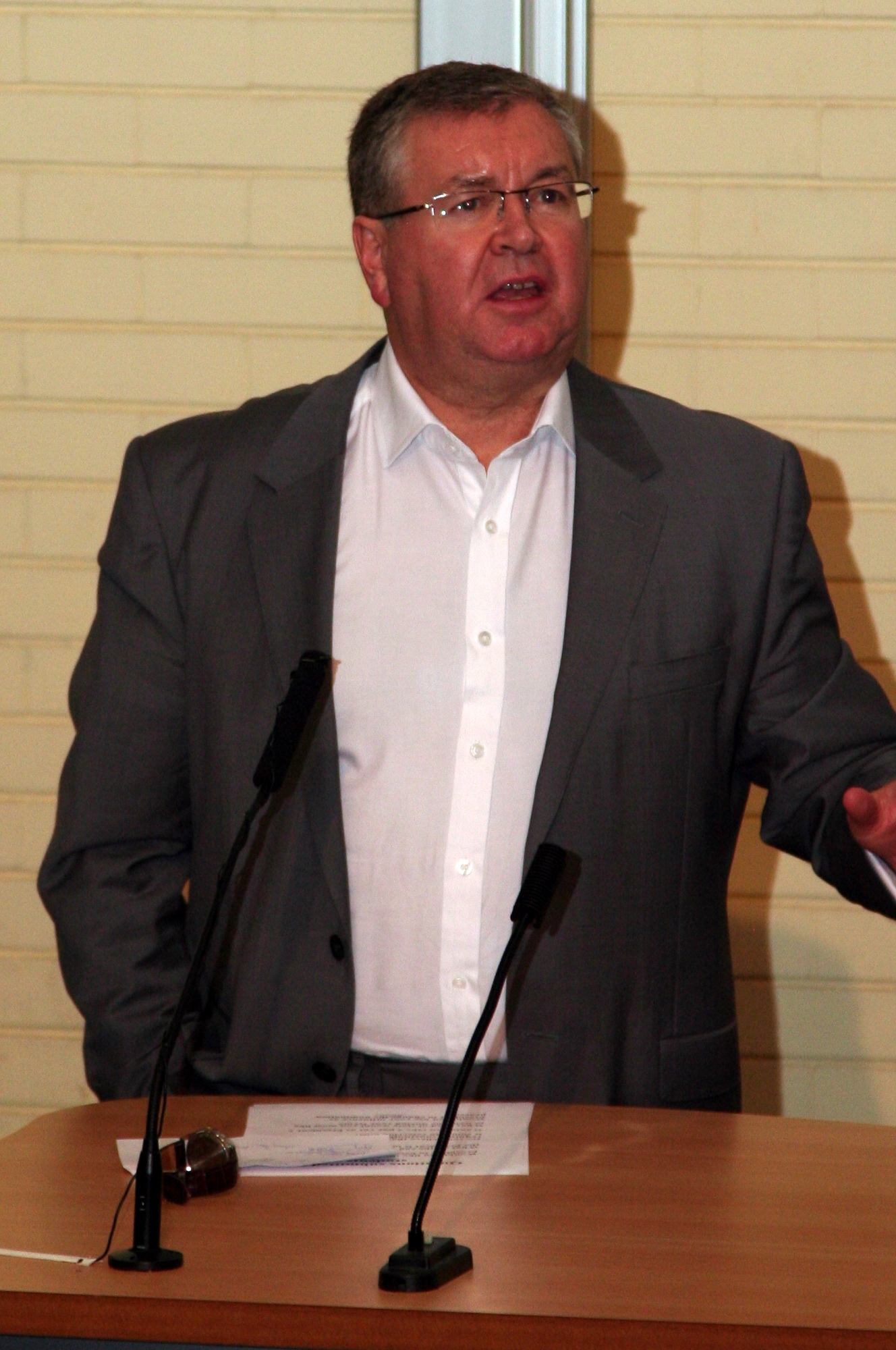
- Joe Duffy in September 2011
- Born: Joseph Duffy; 27 January 1956 (age 70); Mountjoy Square, Dublin, Ireland
- Education: Trinity College Dublin
- Occupation: Radio presenter
- Employer: RTÉ
- Agent: Noel Kelly
- Known for: Presenting Liveline

Joseph Duffy (born 27 January 1956) is a retired Irish radio and TV presenter employed by RTÉ. One of the public service broadcaster's highest-earning stars, he is a former presenter of Liveline, an interview and phone-in chat show broadcast on RTÉ Radio 1 on Mondays to Fridays between 13:45 and 15:00.

Duffy was a student activist and a former president of the Aontas na Mac Léinn in Éirinn (AMLÉ). He is married, is the father of triplets, and resides in Clontarf, Dublin. He won a Jacob's Award in 1992.

On 8 May 2025, Duffy announced that he would be retiring from RTÉ after 37 years with his final Liveline show on 27 June 2025.

== Early life ==
Duffy was born on 27 January 1956 in Mountjoy Square, Dublin. He was brought up in Ballyfermot, one of five siblings. His father was Jimmy and his mother Mabel. Jimmy, who had problems with alcohol, died aged 58 in 1984. Joe Duffy's brother Aidan was killed in a road accident on the Maynooth Road in 1991 aged 25, with Joe first learning of the "horrific accident" on the news on RTÉ Radio. Joe's brother Brendan was described by him as "crippled, ruined and wrecked by a savage addiction" to sniffing glue which he developed as a teenager.

Duffy attended De La Salle Boys' primary school, St Lorcan's B.N.S. and St John's De La Salle College. He enrolled at Trinity College Dublin (TCD) in 1977 to study Social Work and was elected President of Trinity College Students' Union in 1979, becoming President of Aontas na Mac Léinn in Éirinn (AMLÉ), formerly the Union of Students in Ireland (USI) four years later. As President of AMLÉ he was once jailed for an occupation in which he had participated.

In 2008, he appeared on the RTÉ television series Who Do You Think You Are?, where his family history in the British Army in India was revealed.

== Career ==
=== Liveline ===
Duffy claims he thought about resigning from RTÉ in 2007 after the broadcaster forced him to give Justice Minister Michael McDowell a platform on Liveline to make a "party political broadcast". Duffy considered it "direct party-political interference" in Liveline. However, he went ahead with the broadcast and did not resign or make any protest on air.

In October 2008, he was proactive as a supporter of Irish pensioners who marched on Leinster House (home of the Oireachtas) to protest at the proposed means testing of their medical cards in the Government Budget. However, earlier that month, he was reportedly censored by the government when he attempted to continually discuss the effects of the 2008 financial crisis in Ireland. This followed on from the outrage caused when Duffy was held responsible by Finance Minister, Brian Lenihan, for inciting widespread public fear that Irish citizens were on the verge of losing their savings. Several callers freely spoke of their lack of confidence in the banking system, of how they had withdrawn their money from banks, some of which were identified, and were either carrying it around on their person, or considering keeping it "under the mattress", or burying it in their garden. Lenihan personally rang Cathal Goan, the Director-General of RTÉ, on 18 September 2008 (the date of the show) to express his outrage at the sudden increase in potentially disastrous speculation following the show.

The extent of The Finance Minister's concern first publicly emerged the following morning when he was interviewed by RTÉ's economics editor George Lee. In that interview, Lenihan insisted that deposits were not in any danger and said that people should not be going to banks to shift their deposit accounts "on the basis of unfounded allegations made on radio programmes".

Rival broadcaster TV3 accused RTÉ and Joe Duffy of waging a "dirty tricks" war against them after a late-night game show run by TV3 was berated by callers to Liveline and saying several times on air that he had been unable to get a representative from the station to reply to callers' concerns. TV3 said a lengthy statement was sent to the Liveline office almost two hours before the September 2009 show went on air but was ignored, despite the fact that it clarified some of the issues. The Play TV service was discontinued by TV3 in March 2010 after 29 complaints to the Broadcasting Authority of Ireland (BAI), though TV3 said it was because of a decline in viewership.

Journalist Kevin Myers wrote in October 2009, "Throw in some mob-oratory from the national broadcaster's disgraceful 'Liveline', and almost no state institution and no politician is safe from the vengeful, idiot wrath of Madame La Guillotine, or Les Heureuses Tricoteuses."

=== Earnings ===
Duffy earned €408,889 in 2008. RTÉ's Director General said there was "no question that by today's standards" the salaries paid to its top presenters last year "were excessive. I have to repeat that they were set at a different time in a different competitive reality where some of this talent might be up for poaching by other organisations and in RTÉ's view at the time, they delivered value for money".

Listeners, who contacted RTÉ Radio 1's Drivetime programme were swift to condemn the salary level, saying it was ironic that programmes like Liveline – presented by Joe Duffy – were used as a platform for criticising the pay and expenses of Oireachtas members.

Duffy defended his own high wages and those of his fellow RTÉ presenters while appearing on TV3's Midweek in October 2011, claiming they were agreed "fair and square". The following month, his 2009 earnings were revealed by RTÉ to have been €389,314. He defended this by saying he considered himself and his Liveline show "good value" for RTÉ.

In March 2013, it was revealed he had earned €378,000 in 2011, which increased to €392,494 in 2019.

=== Panto ===
In 2018–19, Duffy played (in pre-recorded sequences) the Magic Mirror in the Cheerios Panto, Snow White, making use of some of the Liveline catchphrases, such as "Talk to Joe".

== Lampooning of Joe Duffy on The Savage Eye ==
Duffy was frequently lampooned at length on the satirical TV programme The Savage Eye. It portrays him as a fetish garment clad sado-masochist who derives perverse pleasure by urging his call-in radio listeners in a strong working class Dublin accent, to express excesses of degradation and misery as he "empathises" verbally and plays with his nipple clamps. Duffy has since questioned viewership figures for The Savage Eye on his daily radio show and had questioned whether it is "blasphemous" on his Sunday afternoon religious affairs TV show Spirit Level.

== Personal life ==
Joe Duffy is married to June and is the father of triplets born in 1995. He currently resides on Dublin's Northside.

Duffy retraced his Christian roots in 2010 by hosting an RTÉ One TV show called Joe Duffy's Spirit Level which discussed the great faith of the Irish people and various religions present in the country, and also queried whether David McSavage's satirical portrayal of Duffy could be considered blasphemous.

His autobiography Just Joe was launched by Gay Byrne in Harry's Bar in October 2011. In 2014, Duffy made a cameo in Mrs. Brown's Boys D'Movie as himself. The film was negatively received but was a moderate box office success.

In August 2022, Joe described on his radio programme his terrifying recent encounter with a weever on a Dublin beach, leading to 'excruciating pain' which necessitates him wearing swim boots at all times.

== Awards ==
In 1992, Duffy won a Jacob's Award for his reports on RTÉ Radio 1's The Gay Byrne Show.

Duffy was named 11th most influential person of 2009 by Village.
