= RTÉ Leadership Team =

Management committee of Irish public service broadcaster

The RTÉ Leadership Team replaced the RTÉ Executive Board following the resignation of Dee Forbes in 2023 and the appointment of Kevin Bakhurst following the RTÉ secret payment scandal, it is a committee composed of the senior management of the Irish public service broadcaster, Raidió Teilifís Éireann, responsible for the day-to-day running of the broadcaster.

The Leadership Team reports to the RTÉ Board through the Director-General. The Director-General is appointed by the RTÉ Board, with the consent of the government and the Minister for Culture, Communications and Sport, while the other members of the Leadership Team are appointed by the Director-General.

== Leadership Team ==
==== Interim Leadership Team ====
Former executive board members Adrian Lynch, Paula Mullooly, Eimear Cusack, Richard Waghorn and Deirdre McCarthy were all announced as members of the Interim leadership team, while Mike Fives (Group Financial Director), Vivienne Flood (Head of Public Affairs), Niamh O'Connor (Deputy Director of Content) and Conor Mullen (Head of Strategy and Commercial Compliance) were added temporarily.

==== Changes to the Leadership Team ====
Paula Mullooly, exited RTÉ at the end of 2023, and was replaced by Daniel Coady as Director of Legal Affairs.

Mike Fives remains as Group Financial Director was replaced on the Leadership Team by Mari Hurley who was appointed CFO in March 2024.

Conor Mullen moved from the team in favour of the newly appoint Commercial Director Gavin Deans.

With the departure of Jim Jennings the role of Director of Content was split between two new roles Director of Video and Director of Audio both roles were advertised in April 2024. On 1 July 2024 Patricia Monahan, former Managing Editor of Newstalk, was appointed as Director of Audio, while Steve Carson, former Director of BBC Scotland (TV channel), was appointed Director of Video.

On 21 May 2025 Eleanor O'Shaughnessy joined the leadership team in the new role of Chief Risk and Compliance Officer, she joined from Primark. This completed the permanent Leadership Team.

==== Later Changes ====
Eimear Cusack left the broadcaster in the spring of 2026, she did not receive a redundancy or exit payment. Annette Malone was appointed Chief People Officer at the end of March 2026.

Mari Hurley left in 2026 and was replace by Annemarie Britz.

Richard Waghorn will exit RTÉ in April 2027, he said to the Irish Times "Ireland should be immensely proud of RTÉ as an organisation", only Adrian Lynch and Deirdre McCarthy remain from the Executive Board that was lead by Dee Forbes.

Position	Office holder	Notes
Director-General	Kevin Bakhurst	
Deputy Director-General and Director of Audiences, Channels & Marketing	Adrian Lynch	Former member of the executive board
Chief Financial Officer	Annemarie Britz	
Chief People Officer	Annette Malone	Replaces Director of Human Resources
Chief Risk & Compliance Officer	Eleanor O’Shaughnessy	New position
Chief Technology Officer	Richard Waghorn	Former member of the executive board, exits in April 2027
Director of Legal Affairs	Daniel Coady	
Commercial Director	Gavin Deans	
Managing Director of RTÉ News and Current Affairs	Deirdre McCarthy	Former member of the executive board
Director of Video	Steve Carson	Replaces Director of Content
Director of Audio	Patricia Monahan	Replaces Director of Content

== The Final RTÉ Executive Board ==
The executive board was chaired by the Director General of RTÉ, while the other members of the Executive Board were appointed by the Director-General.

The remainder of the committee included managing directors of television, radio, news and current affairs, and heads of content, channels and marketing, corporate development, commercial, legal and other functions, the chief digital officer, the chief technology officer, the chief financial officer.

=== Changes to the executive board (2017–2023) ===
Under Dee Forbes the executive board was restructured in October 2017. The Directors of TV and Radio were replaced by the Director of Content and the Director of Audience, Channels and Marketing. Frances Abeton left the role of Director of Operations and Production Services at the end of 2018.

In November 2018 Willie O'Reilly left the executive board to take up the position of chairman of iRadio, Geraldine O'Leary replaced him as commercial director; she initially did not sit on the Executive Board. In 2019 Rory Coveney became Director of Strategy and was appointed to the board, O'Leary was also appointed to the board at this time. Paula Mullooly then joined the Executive Board as Legal Director.

In 2020 Breda O'Keeffe left RTÉ "under a voluntary restructuring programme" and left her position as CFO and she was replaced by Richard Collins.

On 21 June 2022, Jon Williams announced his resignation as managing director of RTÉ News and Current Affairs and stepped down at the end of July. He left RTÉ with an exit payment even though he left the broadcaster of his own accord. He was replaced by Deirdre McCarthy on an interim basis, before taking up the position permanently on 19 December 2022.

It was announced on 18 April 2023 that Kevin Bakhurst, former Deputy Director General and managing director of News and Current Affairs was appointed Director-General and took the position in July 2023, returning to the broadcaster after a period of 7 years.

Adrian Lynch, Director of Channels & Marketing, was appointed to the position of Deputy Director-General in June 2023; he also assumed the role of interim Director-General following the suspension and later resignation of Dee Forbes, and prior to the arrival of Bakhurst in July 2023.

On 7 July 2023, in the wake of the RTÉ secret payment scandal, Director of Strategy Rory Coveney resigned from his position with immediate effect following a meeting with the incoming Director-General Kevin Bakhurst. On 10 July 2023, continuing from the fall out of the RTÉ secret payment scandal, Geraldine O'Leary announced her decision to retire early from RTÉ, she was due to retire later that year.

On 11 October 2023 it was announced that RTÉ's CFO Richard Collins had resigned from the organisation.

It was announced that former Director of Content Jim Jennings would not take up a position on the leadership board on his return to work, however on 21 August 2024 it was announce that Jim Jennings would leave RTÉ as of 31 August 2024 following an agreement made at Workplace Relations Commission, WRC.

The final members of the executive board were:

Position	Office holder	Notes
Director-General	Dee Forbes	Suspended / resigned
Chief Financial Officer	Richard Collins	Resigned on 11 October 2023
Director of Strategy	Rory Coveney	Resigned on 7 July 2023
Director of Commercial	Geraldine O'Leary	Took early retirement from 10 July 2023, due to retire later in 2023
Director of Legal	Paula Mullooly	Exited RTÉ at the end of 2023
Director of Content	Jim Jennings	Exited in August 2024, following long term sick leave and a WRC ruling.
Director of Human Resources	Eimear Cusack	Exited RTÉ on 30 March 2026
Director of Operations & Technology	Richard Waghorn	Will Exit RTÉ in April 2027
Director of Audiences, Channels & Marketing Acting Deputy Director-General	Adrian Lynch	Became Acting DG on the resignation of Dee Forbes.
Managing Director of RTÉ News and Current Affairs	Deirdre McCarthy	

== Controversies ==
=== Mission to Prey ===
Following RTÉ's defamation of Father Kevin Reynolds in its "Mission to Prey" episode of Prime Time, RTÉ announced that Ed Mulhall, MD News, had "retired" on 3 April 2012.

=== Presenter pay and other matters ===
In June 2023, RTÉ admitted that it paid its top presenter Ryan Tubridy €345,000 more than publicly declared between 2017 and 2022. Dee Forbes was suspended as Director General a day prior to the controversy, and ultimately resigned with immediate effect on 26 June. A statement from the interim Director General claimed that only Forbes had a complete picture, although someone prepared all the materials, advised her and enacted the actions to engage and pay Tubridy.
