= Kevin McCourt =

Irish businessman

Kevin McCourt (1915–2000) was an Irish businessman and Director-General of RTÉ between 1962 and 1968. He also served as Managing Director of Irish Distillers and the Dutch firm Hunter Douglas.

== Early life and education ==
He was born 14 April 1915 in Tralee, County Kerry, second son among three sons and one daughter of John McCourt, originally of Banbridge, County Down, clerk with the congested districts board at Tralee, and later a distributor with Argosy Libraries, and Mary Christina McCourt (née Small) of Co. Down. He was educated at the Christian Brothers in Dún Laoghaire, Co. Dublin, and Blackrock College. He left school at 16 he joined the Dublin United Tramway Company as a clerk (1933–7), during which time he continued his education part-time at the Rathmines College of Commerce Dublin Institute of Technology. On qualifying as both a chartered secretary and a certified accountant he became client company secretary (1937–40) with Kennedy, Crowley & Co., chartered accountants, later becoming secretary and accountant (1940–44) to McAuley & Co., wool merchants.

== Businessman ==
In 1944 he became secretary (1944–9) to the Federation of Irish Manufacturers (FIM) (subsequently the Federation of Irish Industry and then the Confederation of Irish Industry) where he helped to create the public relations committee (1945) and came into close contact with the Minister of Industry and Commerce, Seán Lemass. In 1949 McCourt was appointed a director (1949–51) and founder member of the Industrial Development Authority (IDA) by Lemass's successor, Daniel Morrissey. After his brief tenure with the IDA he worked for seven years as executive director (1951–8) with P. J. Carroll, tobacco manufacturers, where he learned the problems of production. He helped to modernise the firm's antiquated manufacturing processes and brought Don Carroll into the company. He attempted to persuade the family run company to be more brand aware and to spend more money on advertising. Between 1958-1963 he worked in the Netherlands with international aluminium manufacturers Hunter Douglas NV as joint managing director.

== Director General of RTÉ ==
Seán Lemass, then Taoiseach, asked him to return to Ireland to become the second director general of RTÉ. Despite a significant drop in remuneration he took up the post on 1 January 1963. The time was a controversial one with attempts at interference from Archbishop John Charles McQuaid and the views of Lemass, who believed it should be "an instrument of public policy", he insisted that RTÉ remain independent of both church and state.

Shows such as The Late Late Show prospered during this time and had a profound influence on Irish life.

Under McCourt the organization developed and covered several notable events in Ireland including John F. Kennedy's visit to Ireland in 1963, Roger Casement's funeral in 1965 and the 50th anniversary of the Easter Rising in 1966. His tenure always caused unrest within sections of the organisation when in 1968 he decided to integrate the 7 Days programme within the RTÉ News division.

== Later career ==
He stepped down from RTÉ in 1968 and became managing director of the United Distillers of Ireland Ltd. (later Irish Distillers). Throughout his ten years with the group he spearheaded the integration of a company that had been created from an amalgamation of three competing distilleries and oversaw the modernisation and rationalisation of the firm by moving all whiskey production to a single site in Midleton, Co. Cork. He was also instrumental in the purchase of Bushmills Distillery and responsible for creating a partnership with the Canadian firm Seagrams, who purchased 20% of United Distillers. In 1972 he agreed to write a series of articles for the Sunday Independent, which embroiled him in a controversy between the newspaper and the National Union of Journalists. The NUJ objected to his writing the articles on the basis that it was a threat to the employment of their members. The dispute caused the non-publication of one issue of the Sunday Independent, after which he ended the dispute by withdrawing the articles.

During an all-out strike at Irish Distillers Group in 1974, McCourt focused on trade unions saying; "Our country is involved in a war, a war that threatens the development we all legitimately seek . . . We can go a long way towards winning our share in Ireland of this particular war by putting in more than we try to take out, by some reduction in self-interest in favour of the national well-being."

By the time he retired from United Distillers the company's profits had risen from £500,000 to £3,500,000. After his retirement he remained on the board until 1983.

He was also director (1965–9) and chairman (1969–73) of Gorta, the famine relief agency, and chairman of Irish Steel (1975–86); Alexander Stenhouse (Ireland) Ltd (1980–87); Algemene Bank Nederland (Ireland) Ltd (1980–85); Irish Agricultural Machinery (1982–8); and Hibernian Life Assurance Ltd (1987–9). He held a number of other directorships in Foir Teoranta (1972–9), Jefferson Smurfit Group (1979–89) and Peterson Tennant Group Ltd (1979–82). Even in later life he remained involved in business becoming director of Fran Rooney's Baltimore Technologies. He was a benefactor of University College Dublin's Michael Smurfit Graduate Business School with the McCourt University Challenge named after him from 2004.

He died 13 May 2000 in Dublin.

== Personal life ==
He married (1940) Margaret (‘Peggy’) McMahon of Dublin, daughter of John McMahon, barrister. In 2009, Eugene McCague published a biography of McCourt entitled My Dear Mr McCourt.
