= Cathal Goan =

Director-General of RTÉ
- In office 4 June 2003 – 20 January 2011
- Preceded by: Bob Collins
- Succeeded by: Noel Curran

Personal details
- Born: Cathal Séamus Goan; 5 May 1954 (age 72) Belfast, Northern Ireland
- Spouse: Maighread Ní Dhomhnaill (m. 1983)
- Children: 1
- Education: University College Dublin
- Profession: Television producer; Editor in chief; Journalist
- Salary: ca. €250,000 (2008)

Cathal Séamus Goan (born 5 May 1954) was Director-General of RTÉ from 2003 to 2011. He also played a leading role in the launch of TG4.

Goan was born in Ardoyne, Belfast. He is an Irish language speaker. He studied Celtic studies at University College Dublin. He joined RTÉ as an archivist in 1979, with RTÉ Radio. He became a producer and senior producer on RTÉ Radio. In 1988, he moved to RTÉ Television and worked on Today Tonight. Remaining in current affairs, he became editor of Cúrsaí, an Irish language television programme about arts and current affairs. He became Editor of Irish Language Programming in 1990.

Four years after being appointed Editor, he was approached to become 'Ceannasaí' of the new Teilifís na Gaeilge. From August 1994, he managed the commencement of the new television channel. After a successful launch of the channel, where award-winning programming was produced, he returned to RTÉ in 2000. He was appointed Director of Television and became a member of the RTÉ Executive Board.

Bob Collins retired as Director-General of RTÉ in 2003 to pursue a career elsewhere. It was announced in July 2003 that Goan would fill this position. He became the Director-General in October 2003. In 2008, Goan had a salary of €280,000, but it was reduced by €35,000. In 2006, he was announced as member of the board of National Concert Hall, and will serve there until May 2011. After the broadcast of a news item on nude pictures of Taoiseach Brian Cowen, Minister Michael Kennedy called for Goan to "consider his position" as Director-General of RTÉ. Goan also received criticism from Minister Éamon Ó Cuív in February 2010, when Sunday Mass was reduced to being broadcast just once a month on RTÉ Raidió na Gaeltachta.

Goan announced in July 2010, that he intended to step down at the end of his seven-year term. His resignation was accepted by the RTÉ Board.

Goan is married to Irish singer Maighread Ní Dhomhnaill. She met him when she was "16 or 17 [years of age]".
