= Moya Doherty =

Irish businesswoman, co-founder of Riverdance

- Born: Pettigo, County Donegal, Ulster, Ireland
- Occupation: Entrepreneur
- Spouse: John McColgan

Moya Doherty (born 1957) is a Dublin-raised Irish entrepreneur and the producer and co-founder of Riverdance.

== Early life ==
Doherty was born in Pettigo, a village in the south-east of County Donegal in Ulster. While most of Pettigo is in County Donegal, a small part of the village, the Tullyhommon area, is in County Fermanagh. Both of her parents, Daniel and Patricia (née Mulhern), were primary school teachers from Dungloe, a small town in The Rosses district in the west of County Donegal. Her parents families, the Dohertys and the Mulherns, owned pubs in Dungloe. At the age of seven, she moved from Pettigo down to Dublin with her parents; she spent the rest of her childhood and teenage years in Dublin. Her parents later moved back to Dungloe when they retired. She has two sisters, Niamh and Nuala, and two brothers, Pádraig and Seán. Doherty attended Manor House School, a Catholic secondary school in Raheny.

== Riverdance ==
Riverdance is a worldwide acclaimed theatrical phenomenon, which premiered in Dublin's Point Theatre in February 1995. Riverdance had started as a seven-minute interlude at the 1994 Eurovision Song Contest in Dublin, commissioned by Moya Doherty, who was the show's Executive Producer.

== Business interests ==
Doherty was chair of the RTÉ Board, the board of Irish public service broadcaster RTÉ from 2014 until 2022. During this time she oversaw the write down of a major IT project worth €3.6 million, she maintained that Toy Show The Musical was the right risk to take for RTÉ which lost the broadcaster €2.8 million. She was previously a director of television production company Tyrone Productions. She was a founding director of the independent national commercial radio station Radio Ireland (which later rebranded as Today FM). She is a member of the board of the Dublin Theatre Festival. She was formerly a member of the board of the Abbey Theatre.

== Personal life ==
Doherty is married to the co-founder of Riverdance, John McColgan, whom she married in 1986, and she is regarded as one of the wealthiest women in Ireland, with an estimated fortune of €45 million. McColgan and Doherty have two sons and lived for many years on an extensive property in the Baily area of Howth and, having sold the main property, retained a 3-bedroom house with private access.
