= Toy Show The Musical =

2022 Irish musical

Toy Show
- The Musical
- Book: Jamie Beamish
- Basis: The Late Late Toy Show
- Premiere: 10 December 2022: The Auditorium, Convention Centre, Dublin

Toy Show The Musical is a musical based on The Late Late Toy Show. It was created and developed by RTÉ, the national broadcaster of Ireland. The musical focuses on a twelve-year-old girl, Nell Mooney, who goes on an adventure as she and her family prepare for the Toy Show.

Toy Show The Musical opened at the Convention Centre in Dublin, on 10 December 2022 and ran until 31 December 2022.

Poor ticket sales resulted in a heavy financial loss to RTÉ.

== Background ==
On 13 May 2022, Raidió Teilifís Éireann (RTÉ) announced details of a Christmas musical for the first time, with Toy Show The Musical to premiere at the Convention Centre in Dublin from 10 to 31 December 2022. Shortly after the announcement, casting opened for the musical, with girls aged between 11 and 16 being sought to play the lead role.

The full cast was announced throughout October and November 2022 which featured actors from Derry Girls, Fair City and Emmerdale in the lead adult roles, while three girls would take turns to play the lead role of Nell.

Speaking to the Irish Examiner in November 2022, The Late Late Show producers Jane Murphy and Katherine Drohan revealed that they had first thought about the idea prior to COVID-19. During the pandemic, Murphy and Drohan worked together and developed a two-year plan.

== Production history ==
In May 2022, RTÉ announced its intention to stage its first musical based on The Late Late Toy Show, engaging Séimí Campbell as director, RuthAnne Cunningham and Harry Blake as the composer, Sarah Travis as musical supervisor and orchestrator, James Cousins as choreographer, Colin Richmond as set and costume designer and Paul Keogan as lighting designer.

The musical premiered at the Convention Centre, with an official opening on 10 December 2022. It ran until 31 December 2022.

In May 2023, after the show had closed, Tierney-Keogh wrote in a letter to the Oireachtas Public Accounts Committee that the contracts negotiated with creative workers "were below industry standard".

== Reception ==
Writing in The Irish Times, Sara Keating praised the staging and prop design, but felt that the show made too much of the Toy Show's wider significance, and wrote that "it is difficult not to feel cynical about the artistic intention of what is essentially a spectacular, self-congratulatory marketing ploy." Ruth O'Connor on the Irish Examiner wrote based on a preview performance that the story was "heartwarming".

=== Commercial failure ===
Several performances of the musical were cancelled during its opening run at the Convention Centre Dublin due to cast and crew illness; of those that went ahead, many tickets remained unsold. Brian Stanley, in his role as chair of the Public Accounts Committee, commented during the show's run that the commercial risks had evidently been too high and that, "on the face of it, it appears that proper market research was not done." Discussing Toy Show The Musical at the Oireachtas Media Committee in January 2023, a representative of the RTÉ director-general stated that "the reaction from audiences that did attend was fantastic, particularly children" and that, while ticket sales made the show unsustainable in 2022, RTÉ was examining ways to bring it back in the future. In May 2023, it was confirmed the show would not return that year.

Documents became publicly available in the wake of the RTÉ secret payment scandal in July 2023 confirming that the losses from Toy Show The Musical reached €2.2 million. It cost over €3 million to produce and it had been expected to sell 75,000 tickets across 54 shows in the 1,995 seat capacity venue, but was only attended by 20,000. Of these, 11,044 tickets were sold to paying customers; the balance were supplied to guests on a complimentary basis or awarded as competition prizes. The number of shows was reduced to 27 from lack of interest.

=== Investigation ===
Auditors Grant Thornton found that the musical was never formally approved by the RTÉ Board and also that it was unclear whether there was any form of board approval. Grant Thornton also found board members had not adequately investigated predicted sales, and that non-standard accounting practices had been used.

== Cast and characters ==
Character	2022
Nell Mooney	Ceola Dunne
Nell Mooney	Clare Keeley
Nell Mooney	Doireann McNally
Áine Mooney (Nell's mother)	Clare Barrett
Brendan Mooney (Nell's father)	Jamie Beamish
Nana (Nell's grandmother)	Anna Healy
Luan (Nell's brother)	Gus Holmes
Luan (Nell's brother)	Joseph Dunne
Luan (Nell's brother)	Mark Keegan
Maisie (Nell's best friend)	LilyMai Clancy
Maisie (Nell's best friend)	Mabel Sweeney
Maisie (Nell's best friend)	Sadbh Breathnach
Special appearances
Adam King (guest on the 2020 Toy Show)	Noah Rafferty (guest on the 2020 Toy Show)
DJ Calum (guest on the 2021 Toy Show)	Alex Hughes (guest on the 2017 Toy Show)
