= National Youth Organisation (Grenada) =

NYO symbol

The National Youth Organization (abbreviated NYO) was a youth organization in Grenada. NYO was the youth wing of the New Jewel Movement.

== Emergence as a mass organization ==
Before the revolution NYO operated as a clandestine organization. Prior to the revolution, the organization had around 40 members. In 1974 NYO was joined by the Grenada Assembly of Youth, led by Basil Gahagan. In 1980 the NYO was converted into an open mass organization, in which everyone who supported the party programme of the New Jewel Movement could obtain membership. The transformation of NYO into a mass organization was done simultaneously as NJM developed mass organizations in women's, labour and cooperative sectors. The emergence of mass organizations was partially inspired by the Cuban concept of poder popular, partially by the ideas of workers self-organizing of C. L. R. James.

NYO was represented in the National Advisory Committee, along with other mass organizations, during the Provisional Revolutionary Government.

== Membership ==
By the end of 1981 it had obtained a membership reaching 7,000. However, by 1983 the membership had dipped to around 4,000.

NYO organized youngsters between 14 and 22 years of age. There was also a separate Young Pioneers Movement, for younger children.

== Profile ==
The organization published its own fortnightly newspaper, Fight. Bernard Bourne was the chairman of NYO.

NYO played a major role in the mass alphabetization campaign conducted by the Centre for Popular Education during the revolution. Around 65% of the volunteer teachers in the campaign came from the NYO ranks. The organization also mobilized youth for voluntary labour campaigns.

NYO ran various vocational educational programs, such as trainings in leadership, sports, agriculture, first aid, sewing, handicrafts and forestry. Many of these trainings were conducted during youth camps. NYO also organized sports events.
