= National Youth Organisation (Ireland) =

Representative body

The National Youth Organisation (NYO) is a representative body of students and young people in Ireland, which focuses on issues that affect young people.

The National Youth Organisation is headed by an executive which is chaired by the president of the organisation. As of 2008, the President was Aidan McGrath.

The organisation is involved in a number of campaigns including anti-bullying, mental health campaigns, promotion of youth council campaigns, student council promotion campaigns and even health campaign, it was also involved in creating an advertisement campaign alongside the Health Service Executive to promote positive mental health for young people.
