= Noel Curran =

Irish radio producer, television producer and journalist

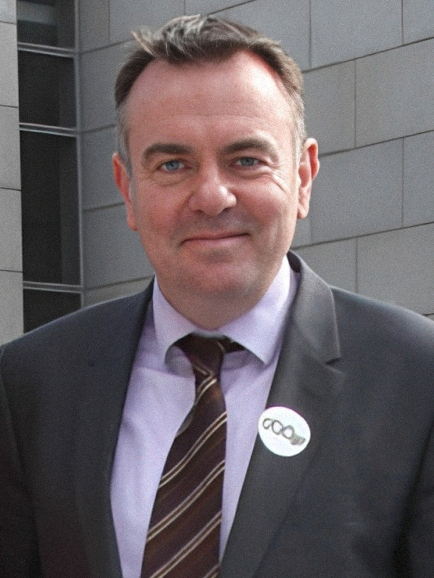
- Curran in 2013

Director-General of the European Broadcasting Union
- Incumbent
- Assumed office October 2017
- President: Jean-Paul Philippot
- Preceded by: Ingrid Deltenre

Director-General of RTÉ
- In office 1 February 2011 – 11 April 2016
- Preceded by: Cathal Goan
- Succeeded by: Dee Forbes

Personal details
- Born: Carrickmacross, Monaghan, Ireland
- Spouse: Eimear Quinn (m. 2005)
- Children: 2
- Education: Dublin City University
- Profession: Radio producer; television producer; journalist

Noel Curran is an Irish television producer and journalist who has been the director-general of the European Broadcasting Union (EBU) since October 2017. Curran also previously served as Chairman of Eurovision Services, the former satellite distribution commercial subsidiary of EBU, and the director-general of Ireland's national broadcaster Raidió Teilifís Éireann (RTÉ) from 2011 to 2016. He has worked in the editorial, management and commercial areas of media.

== Early life ==
Curran was born in Carrickmacross, County Monaghan, where he attended both primary and secondary school. He studied communications in Dublin City University, where he specialised in Irish and international broadcasting policy, writing his final year thesis on the future of public service broadcasting. He also wrote about European broadcasting policy while studying for post-grad.

== Career ==
=== RTÉ ===
He joined Raidió Teilifís Éireann (RTÉ) as a business and investigative reporter in 1992, after a period working for Business & Finance. While working at Business & Finance Curran was involved in several prominent investigations and became deputy editor of the magazine two years after joining as a reporter, before leaving for RTÉ. He joined Current Affairs as a senior financial journalist before becoming a television producer.

He then became executive producer of live entertainment series and productions, producing several live television shows at the Point Theatre, before being appointed as executive producer of the Eurovision Song Contest 1997, held in Dublin, presented by Ronan Keating and Carrie Crowley. He was a member of the EBU Eurovision group.

=== Senior management at RTÉ ===
He returned to RTÉ as editor of current affairs, where he helped launch the Prime Time Investigates series of documentaries. The series won many national and international awards for its documentaries during his tenure. He was editor of the award winning Mary Raftery documentaries Cardinal Secrets and Broken Trust. He spoke on Radio 1's 'Drivetime' programme about Mary Raftery's contribution to journalism after her death in January 2012.

He left RTE to become Director of an independent TV production company. While working in the independent sector he won an IFTA award for the documentary "Bad Blood" which investigated the role of international pharmaceutical companies in the infection of haemophiliacs with HIV.

In 2003, he was appointed managing director of TV, at 37 the youngest person to hold the position, according to the Irish Independent and Irish Times. He led a policy of increased investment in Irish TV production during his tenure, as RTÉ's commercial income grew to its highest historic level. According to the Sunday Business Post Curran's tenure marked the first time editorial and commercial departments in TV were integrated under one managing director.

=== Director General of RTÉ ===
In March 2010, Curran left RTÉ to pursue a consultancy and other private business interests before being interviewed and then appointed DG by the RTÉ board effective from 1 February 2011.

He returned to Dublin City University in April 2016, where he criticised Irish broadcasting policy and warned that RTÉ and public media faced a difficult financial future without changes in policy and funding.
