= Comhairle na nÓg =

Councils for the youth in Ireland

Comhairle na nÓg (English: youth council) are councils for the youth located in 31 locations in Ireland, which gives the youth in Ireland the opportunity to be involved in the progress of local services and policies. Comhairle na nÓg is for young people aged between 12 and 17 in secondary level education and allows them to have a voice on the issues, policies and services that affect them in their local areas, since they have no other voting mechanism to have their voice heard.

It provides a setting for young people to talk about national and local problems which matter to them.

Comhairle na nÓg is recognised as the official structures by the Irish Government for young people to participate in the development of policies and services. This ensures that the youth are included in shaping policies and services.

== History ==
=== Foundation ===
Comhairle na nÓg was created in 2002 as part of the National Children's Strategy (2000). Established by the City and County Development Boards in each of the local authority areas, there were originally 34 councils in total. The Department of Children and Youth Affairs (DCYA) established Comhairle na nÓg to give youth the chance to make changes in their regional areas.

=== 2005 Review by the DYCA ===
A review of Comhairle na nÓg, commissioned by the Office of the Minister for Children and Youth Affairs (OMCYA) noted that many of the 31 Comhairle na nÓg in Ireland were not effectively engaging with young people. A snippet of the report can be found below.

"practices across the country vary considerably both in the quality of Comhairle na nÓg events and programmes and the frequency whereby young people come together to give voice to their views and to make their views known"

This resulted in the Comhairle na nÓg Implementation Group being founded in June 2006, to ensure the effective operation of Comhairle na nÓg.

== Dáil na nÓg ==
The organisation convenes Dáil na nÓg and the National Youth Assembly, in Leinster house every year.Every Comhairle na nog in the country votes for one member to represent their chapter at the assembly. The Dáil na nÓg is attended by members of the Comhairlí

== Annual Youth Conferences ==
Every year, each of the Comhairle na nÓg holds an Annual Youth Conference (AYC) in September or October. All young people are invited from local schools or youth groups. A Comhairle na nÓg committee will be elected/appointed at the AYC.

During the AYC, the young people pick the topic which is most important to them. This topic is then what the committee will work on for the next year.
