= Dee Forbes =

Former Director General of RTÉ

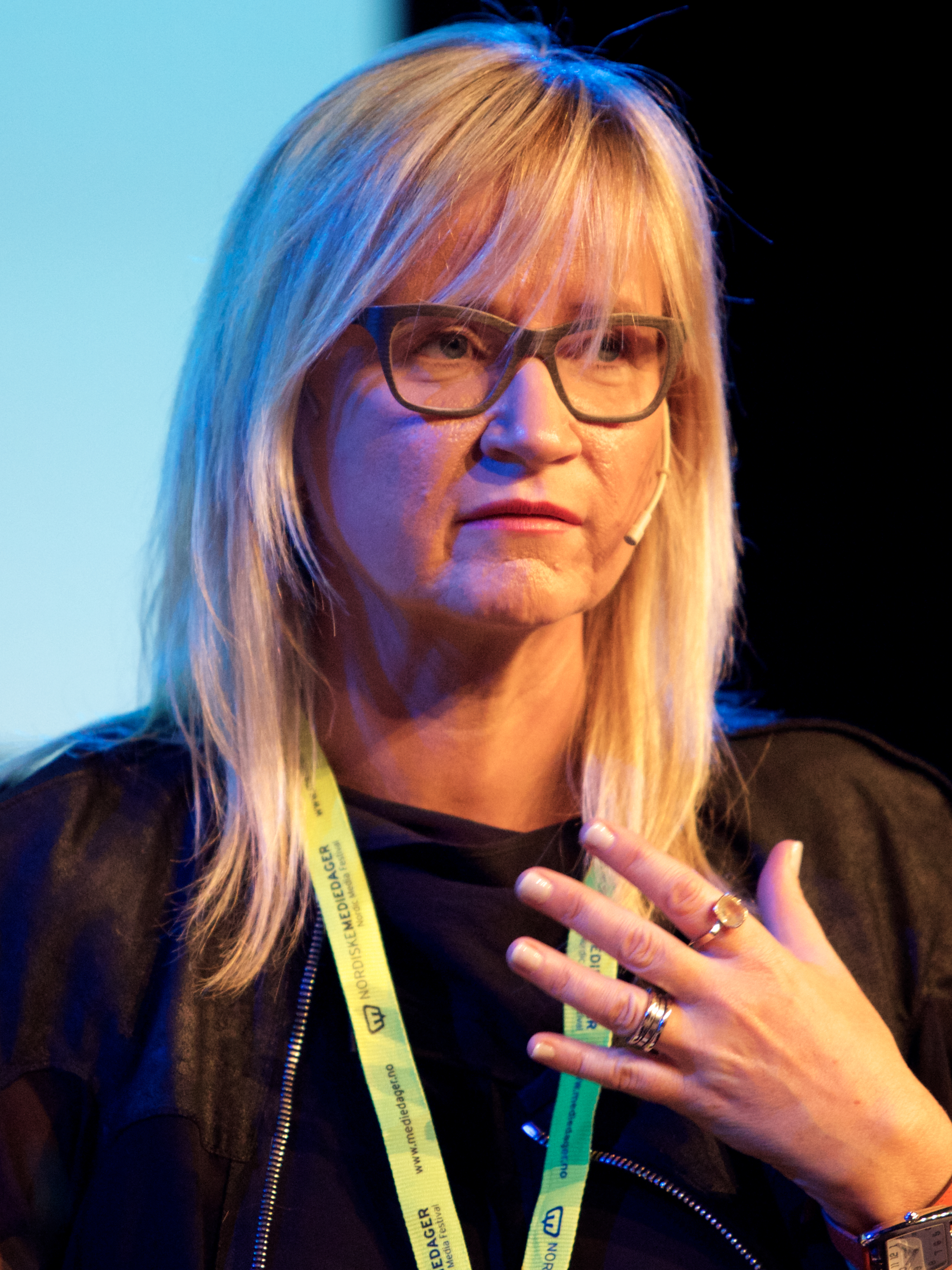
- Forbes in 2015

Director General of RTÉ
- In office 11 July 2016 – 26 June 2023
- Preceded by: Noel Curran
- Succeeded by: Adrian Lynch (Acting); Kevin Bakhurst

Personal details
- Born: Deirdre Anne Forbes; 1 February 1967 (age 59) Drimoleague, Cork, Ireland
- Education: University College Dublin
- Website: Personal Twitter

Deirdre Anne Forbes (born 1 February 1967) is an Irish former broadcasting executive, who was the Director General of RTÉ from April 2016 to June 2023. She was the first woman to hold the role, and the first external appointment in almost 50 years. Prior to joining RTÉ, she was president and managing director of Discovery Networks Northern Europe.

In June 2023, it emerged that RTÉ paid broadcaster Ryan Tubridy €345,000 more than publicly declared between 2017 and 2022, and incurred additional costs related to that. Forbes was suspended from her employment a day prior to the public emergence of the controversy and later issued a statement defending her record; she ultimately resigned with immediate effect on 26 June.

== Early life and education ==
Dee Forbes comes from Drimoleague, County Cork, one of four siblings. Her parents, Vincent and Mackie, ran a bar in the village. She attended a local primary school and then a boarding school in the nearby town of Clonakilty. She then went on to study history and politics at University College Dublin.

== Career ==
In 1989, soon after graduation, Forbes moved to the United Kingdom, taking a position with a major advertising agency, Young and Rubicam.

Forbes worked for Turner Broadcasting's European business for 14 years, at one point heading sales of advertising, and later managing the business in the UK and Ireland, which consisted of seven entertainment channels, including Cartoon Network, Boomerang and TCM. She then moved to Discovery's Western European operation, finishing as president and managing director, with 18 markets, 27 television brands and an audience of 270 million households.

On 1 April 2016, it was announced that she was to succeed Noel Curran as Director General of RTÉ following a recruitment process overseen by its board.

=== Party during pandemic ===
In November 2020, RTÉ apologised after several top news presenters and correspondents, including Bryan Dobson, David McCullagh, Miriam O'Callaghan, Eileen Dunne and Paul Cunningham, were photographed at a retirement party at RTÉ headquarters where social distancing was not fully observed. Taoiseach Micheál Martin described the photographs as "very disappointing". A month later, a health and safety review conducted by RTÉ into the gathering found that five breaches of COVID-19 protocols occurred, with up to 40 people present at the time.

=== Pay controversy and resignation ===
On 22 June 2023, RTÉ noted that it had paid broadcaster Ryan Tubridy €345,000 more than publicly declared between 2017 and 2022, with additional costs of at least €80,000 incurred. The chair of its board said that was a "serious breach of trust with the public", and Minister for Tourism, Culture, Arts, Gaeltacht, Sport and Media Catherine Martin said it was unacceptable that the expected standards of transparency and accountability had not been met. The National Union of Journalists (NUJ) said the secret nature of payments was a "breach of trust unparalleled in the history of RTÉ" and that RTÉ journalists spoke of how "devastated, ashamed, betrayed and angered" they were.

It was revealed the next day that Forbes had been suspended from her employment by the RTÉ Board on 21 June, a day prior to the public emergence of the controversy, which had been under investigation for some time internally. Forbes issued a statement defending her record. Taoiseach Leo Varadkar described the failure as a breach of trust and truth between RTÉ and the Government, the Oireachtas and the people. On 26 June 2023, Forbes tendered her resignation with immediate effect. She noted that "As Director General, I led the discussions with the agent for Ryan Tubridy together with other RTÉ senior executives. We were keen to make a cost saving for RTÉ in respect of a contractual payment which was due to be paid. At the same time, we were attempting to retain Ryan Tubridy's services as a valued presenter and negotiate a new contract, with the agreed 15pc cost cutting target in mind." The statement decried Forbes' treatment in the way the matter was addressed.

A statement from interim Director General Adrian Lynch on 27 June suggested that only Forbes would have had all the information to be sure that the published income figures for Tubridy were wrong, but also noted that Forbes might not agree with the understanding of the statement. Taoiseach Leo Varadkar described the idea that only Forbes had this knowledge as "not credible". RTÉ senior executives were invited to attend meetings of the Oireachtas Media Committee and Public Accounts Committee on 28 and 29 June, convened to question senior executives on the controversy. Forbes declined to attend both meetings citing health reasons and providing a confidential doctor's letter. It emerged at the Oireachtas committee meeting on the 28 June that Forbes was asked to resign on the 16 June, without discussion with the relevant minister. The committee asked why the subsequent resignation was accepted, freeing Forbes from compulsion to attend parliamentary committee meetings, but this was not clarified.

== Other roles ==
Forbes was a non-executive member of the board of The Irish Times from 2013 to 2015, and also served on the boards of Childline and Munster Rugby.

== Recognition ==
Forbes was awarded the honorary degree of Doctor of Literature by University College Cork in 2016.

== Personal life ==
During her time with Discovery, Forbes worked out of London, Helsinki and Copenhagen, while spending weekends at her home in Glandore, which was her primary base while working for RTÉ. Her partner is aerial photographer Dennis Horgan.

She has been married twice. In 1994 she married Fergus Quinn. In the mid-2000s she married Rupert Nathan.
