= Director General of RTÉ =

Chief executive and editor-in-chief of RTÉ

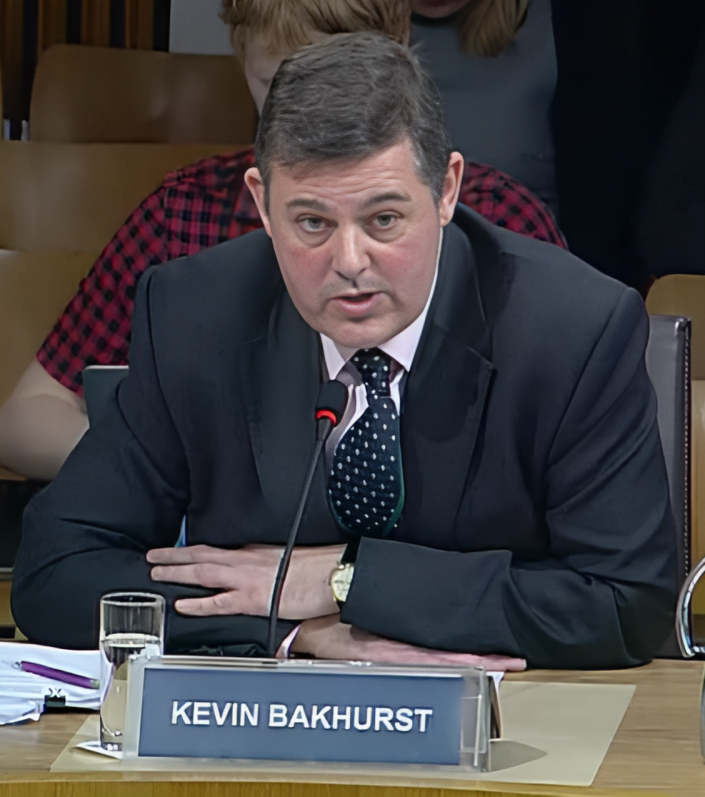
- Incumbent; Kevin Bakhurst since 10 July 2023
- Member of: RTÉ Board; RTÉ Executive Board
- Reports to: RTÉ Board
- Appointer: RTÉ Board
- Formation: 1960
- First holder: Edward J. Roth
- Deputy: Adrian Lynch
- Salary: €306,000

The director general is the chief executive and editor-in-chief of public service broadcaster Raidió Teilifís Éireann (RTÉ). The current director general is Kevin Bakhurst, who replaced Dee Forbes in the role in 2023.

== Appointment and role ==
The RTÉ Board appoints the director general of RTÉ, who fulfils the roles of both chief executive officer and of editor-in-chief

Kevin Bakhurst disbanded the executive on 10 July 2023 in the wake of the RTÉ secret payment scandal, which comprised the company's top management. It was replaced by an interim leadership team.

The director general both reports to the board and sits on it "in an ex officio capacity". At this time, the director general serves a term of five years (reduced from seven years), at the expiry of which he/she may ask for an extension.

=== 2023 controversy ===
In June 2023, RTÉ admitted that it paid its top presenter Ryan Tubridy €345,000 more than publicly declared between 2017 and 2022. Dee Forbes was suspended as Director General a day prior to the controversy, and ultimately resigned with immediate effect on 26 June. Adrian Lynch, Director of Channels & Marketing, was appointed to the position of Deputy Director General; he also assumed the role of interim Director General following the suspension and resignation of Forbes and prior to the planned arrival of Kevin Bakhurst into that role in July 2023.

== Directors general ==
Name	Years served
Edward J. Roth	1960 – 1962
Kevin McCourt	1962 – 1968
Thomas P. Hardiman	1968 – 1975
Oliver Maloney	1975 – 1978
George T. Waters	1978 – 1985
Vincent Finn	1985 – 1992
Joe Barry	1992 – 1997
Bob Collins	1997 – 2003
Cathal Goan	2003 – 2010
Noel Curran	2011 – 2016
Dee Forbes	2016 – 2023
Kevin Bakhurst	2023 – present
