= RTÉ Board =

Governing body of Ireland's State broadcaster

The RTÉ Board is a body of up to twelve people which makes policy and guiding corporate direction for RTÉ, Ireland's state public broadcaster. The board membership includes the broadcaster's chief officer and one elected staff representative.

== History ==
The Board was established as the Radio Éireann Authority under the Broadcasting Authority Act 1960. It later became the RTÉ Authority. The Authority was actually the legal entity known as Raidio Teilifís Éireann and the body which had legal responsibility to run the services authorised under the Broadcasting Authority Acts 1960–2002 but actual management of the services was delegated to the Director General and the staff of the Authority, and all these together comprised RTÉ. The Authority met monthly and acted as RTÉ's board of directors, making general policy and overseeing the operations of RTÉ on a non-executive basis. The RTÉ Authority was appointed by the Minister for Communications, Energy and Natural Resources. The RTÉ Executive reported to the Authority via the Director General.

Under the Broadcasting Act 2009, the RTÉ Authority was succeeded by the RTÉ Board. Having been self-regulating, it lost the regulatory function to the Broadcasting Authority of Ireland (itself succeeded by Coimisiún na Meán in 2023). The final RTÉ Authority was appointed on 24 February 2009 on a six-month interim basis, pending the coming into operation of the Act.

The new Board of RTÉ and the four nominees of the Joint Committee with responsibility for broadcasting for the Broadcasting Authority of Ireland members were to be appointed in early 2010 by the Minister for Communications, Energy and Natural Resources. The RTÉ Executive would now report to the board.

=== 2023 Governance Scandal - Board Changes ===
In November 2022 Moya Doherty completed her term as chair of the RTÉ board, and Siún Ní Raghallaigh was appointed as the new chairperson.

Over the course of the summer of 2023 RTÉ's governance under Moya Doherty's term as Chair and Dee Forbes term as Director General would come under scrutiny. Starting with the admission in June 2023, that RTÉ paid its top presenter Ryan Tubridy €345,000 more than publicly declared between 2017 and 2022.

This led to the suspension of outgoing Director General Dee Forbes (and board member) and her resignation on 26 June 2023. It would also lead to the resignation of the Chair (Siún Ní Raghallaigh) when on 22 February 2024 Minister Catherine Martin was unable to answer if she had confidence in the Chair in a live interview on RTÉ's Prime Time current affairs show, in the early hours of the next day Ms. Ní Raghalliaigh resigned.

Adrian Lynch, Director of Channels & Marketing, was appointed to the position of Deputy Director General; he also assumed the role of interim Director General following the suspension and resignation of Forbes and prior to the arrival of Kevin Bakhurst into that role in July 2023.

Other resignations occur during this time but no board member was asked to resign, though some politicians and pundits did call for the Minister to seek the resignation of board members.

Ian Kehoe did not ask for a second term, his term ended in 2023 after 5 years on the board, Connor Murphy stepped down from the board in 2023 also, having joined in March 2020. Robert Shortt moved from the board when he took up the position of Company Secretary with RTÉ in 2024.

PJ Mathews resigned on 1 March 2024, citing work commitments he had severed on the board for nearly a decade and was due to finish his term in November 2024.

Terence O'Rourke was appointed as Chair on 5 March 2024, along with two new board members Neasa Hardiman and Terri Maloney, on 20 March 2024 the final 2 positions were filled by Shirley Bradshaw, as Staff Representative, and Noreen O'Kelly

Anne O'Leary who head RTÉ Audit and Risk Committee (ARC) finished her second term in November 2024 after a decade on the board. Daire Hickey resigned from the board in January 2025, his term was due to finish in July 2026. Susan Ahern, David Harvey and Jonathan Ruane where the remaining three board members that sat on the board pre-2023, none took a second term on the board.

== Structure ==
The Board sets out strategy, policy and other goals for the RTÉ Executive who then directs the organisation and works to preserve RTÉ's editorial independence. It has an audit and risk committee and a remuneration committee, which are authorised to seek any information they require relevant to their terms of reference.

It consists of up to twelve members – six nominated by the Minister, four nominated by the Minister on the advice of the Oireachtas Joint Committee with responsibility for broadcasting, one worker director and the Director General.

== Current board members ==
As of November 2026, there were eight members, with 4 seats vacant. Six were sourced via the Public Appointments Service, two nominated by the relevant Oireachtas committee, with the current Director General and a staff representative completing the current membership.

Name	Role	Term start	Term end	Notes
Terence O’Rourke	Chairperson	5 March 2024	5 March 2029	
Kevin Bakhurst	Director General (ex-officio)	10 July 2023	10 July 2028	
Aideen Howard		29 November 2022	28 November 2027	
Terri Moloney		5 March 2024	5 March 2029	
Dr Neasa Hardiman		5 March 2024	5 March 2029	
Noreen O'Kerry		20 March 2024	20 March 2029	
Shirley Bradshaw	Staff Representative	20 March 2024	20 March 2029	
Brian MacNeice		26 Nov 2025	25 Nov 2030	
TBA				
TBA				
TBA				
TBA				
