= Kevin Bakhurst =

Irish media executive (born 1965)

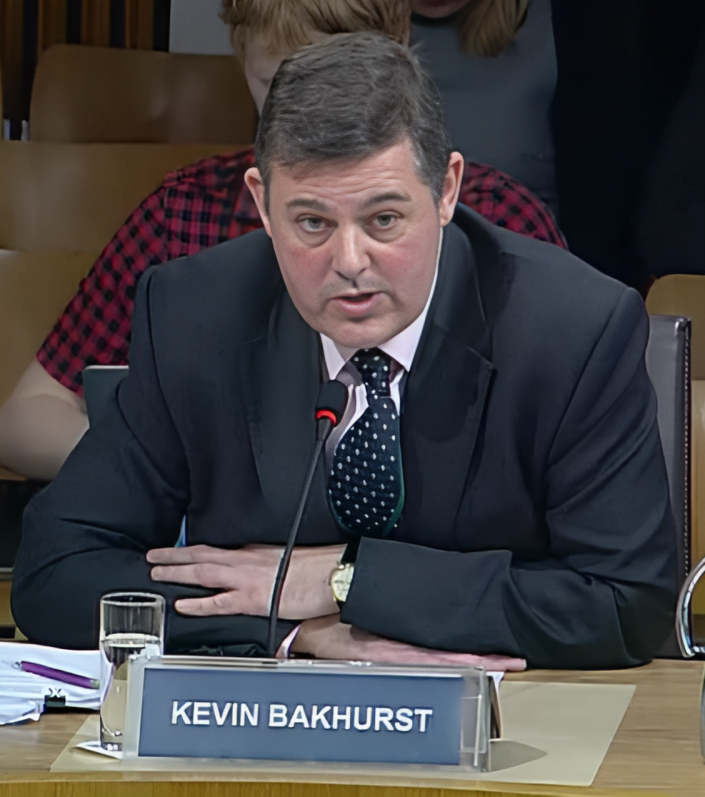
- Bakhurst in 2017

Director General of RTÉ
- Incumbent
- Assumed office 10 July 2023
- Preceded by: Dee Forbes

Personal details
- Born: December 1965 (age 60)
- Education: St John's College, Cambridge
- Website: Personal Twitter

Kevin Bakhurst (born December 1965) is an English journalist and media executive who has been the Director General of RTÉ, the Irish national broadcaster, since July 2023. He previously served as the managing director of news and current affairs and deputy Director General at RTÉ from 2012 to 2016, and before that as group director of content and media policy at the UK regulator Ofcom.

== Career ==
Bakhurst attended Haberdashers' Aske's School in Elstree and then St John's College, Cambridge where he read French and German. After a brief spell of working at Price Waterhouse, he joined the BBC in 1989, first as a researcher and then as an assistant producer at the BBC Business and Economics Unit.

In 1990 he was promoted to producer of the BBC Nine O'Clock News, where he remained until he moved to Brussels in 1994 to gain further experience for BBC News. In 1996, after two years in Brussels, he returned to the UK to become the assistant editor on the BBC Nine O'Clock News, remaining with the programme when it became the BBC Ten O'Clock News. From 2001 to 2003 he was an editor at the BBC News channel, and followed that by being named acting editor of the BBC Ten O'Clock News. He was then confirmed as the permanent editor of the programme in March 2004. During his two years as editor of the BBC Ten O'Clock News it won two Baftas for its coverage of the Madrid Bombings and the 2005 London Tube bombings, and a Royal Television Society award for News Programme of The Year. He was formerly the controller of the BBC News channel, a position he held from December 2005 until September 2012, and was also controller of the BBC News at One bulletin. In May 2010 he became deputy head of the BBC Newsroom.

From September 2012 to October 2016, Bakhurst was the managing director of news and current affairs at Ireland's national public service broadcaster RTÉ. While no official announcement was made he was appointed as Deputy Director General at the end of 2014 or the beginning of 2015, the first official reference to him as Deputy DG was when he attended the Joint Oireachtas Committee on Transport and Communications on 25 March 2015.

In April 2023, RTÉ announced the appointment of Bakhurst as the next Director General of RTÉ from July following an extensive and competitive recruitment process.
