= Committees of the Oireachtas =

Irish parliamentary committees

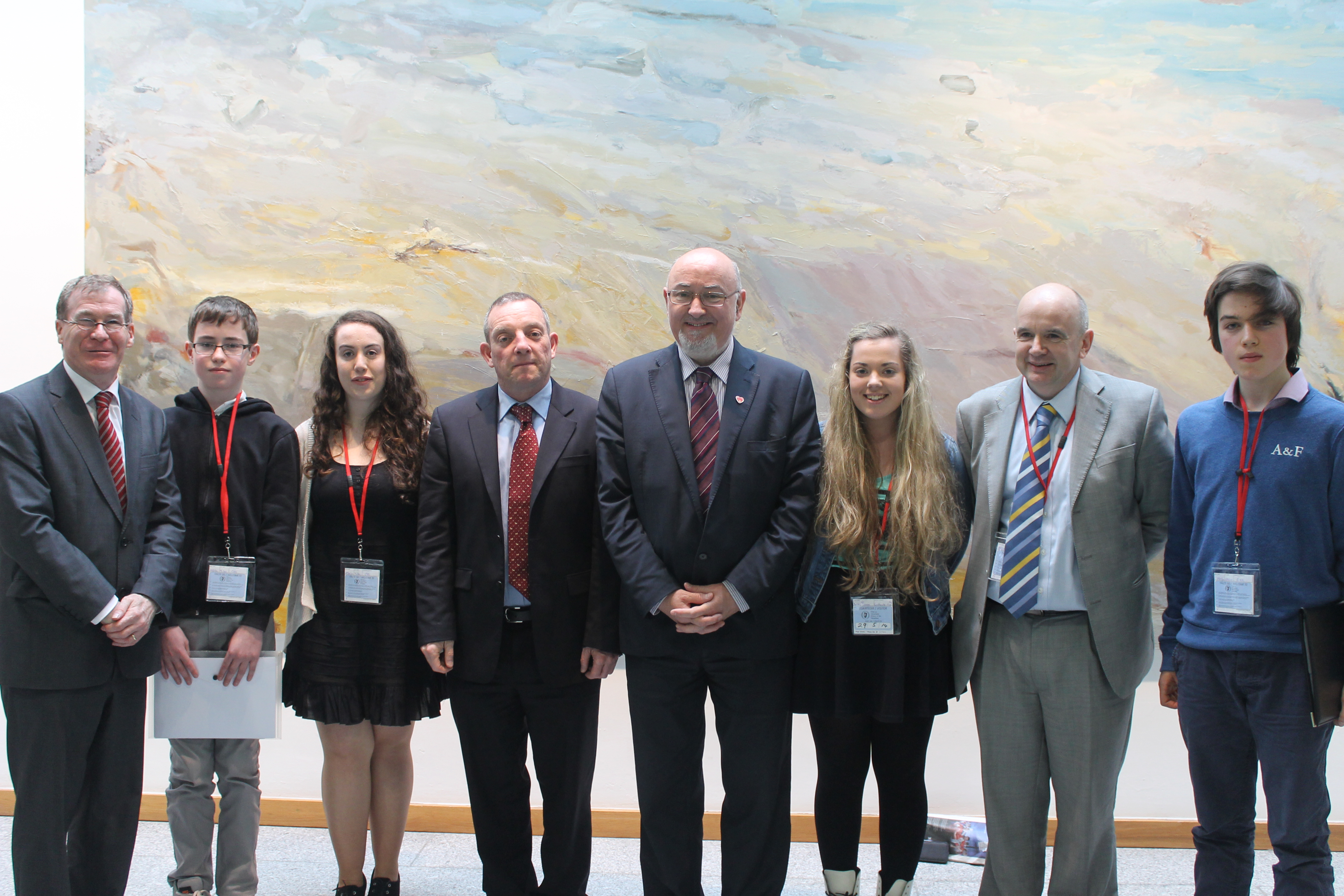
- Some members of the Joint Committee on Health and Children meet with representatives of Dáil na nÓg in 2014
- Legislature(s): Oireachtas
- Website: www.oireachtas.ie/en/committees/

Committees of the Oireachtas are committees and sub-committees and select committees of Dáil Éireann and Joint Committees of Dáil Éireann and Seanad Éireann, that are small groups of TDs and senators of the Oireachtas, the parliament of the Republic of Ireland. Some committees are formed by statute after every general election, others are formed by agreement for a full parliamentary term or for a specific issue on a time-limited basis. Committees are formed on a proportional basis from members of the political parties/groups in each house. Chairs of committees are granted a stipend for their work. Some committees scrutinise the work and proposed legislation from specific government departments, and senior ministers or junior ministers of state as well as public servants or representatives of semi-state bodies and organisations supported by state funding are also regularly invited to address such committees.

The Oireachtas is the National Parliament of Ireland, comprising the President of Ireland and two houses: Dáil Éireann (the House of Representatives) and Seanad Éireann (the Senate). Within this parliamentary structure, committees play a crucial role in the legislative process, oversight, and scrutiny of government activities. These committees are established to examine various aspects of policy, legislation, and governmental operations in greater detail than would be possible in the full houses.

== Types of Committees ==
Joint Committees: These committees comprise members from both Dáil Éireann and Seanad Éireann. They are often established to scrutinize policy areas, conduct inquiries, or oversee certain governmental functions. Joint committees can hold hearings, summon witnesses, and gather evidence to inform their reports and recommendations.

Select Committees: These are established to deal with specific matters, often related to the internal workings of the Oireachtas or particular policy areas. They usually consist of members from both houses and are tasked with detailed examination and report back to the relevant house. For every Select Committee, there exists a corresponding Joint Committee with the same functions and responsibilities.

Standing Committees: Standing Committees are established by Standing Orders of the Oireachtas and fulfill functions that are required by every parliament, such as the scrutiny of public accounts. They contain members from just one house, either the Dáil or the Seanad.

== Key Functions ==
Legislative Scrutiny: Committees examine bills in detail, often conducting pre-legislative scrutiny of draft bills or scrutinizing bills at the committee stage. This process allows for a more detailed examination than is possible on the floor of the houses.

Oversight: Committees provide parliamentary oversight of government departments and agencies. This includes holding ministers and senior officials to account for their policies and actions.

Inquiries and Investigations: Some committees are established to conduct inquiries or investigations into matters of public concern. These can involve holding public hearings, gathering evidence, and producing reports.

Policy Review: Committees can review and report on various policy areas, providing recommendations for change or improvement.

== Powers and Processes ==
Committees have the power to:

- Summon witnesses and require them to give evidence;
- Require the production of documents;
- Conduct hearings in public or private.

Their processes typically involve:

=== Establishment ===
Committees are established by resolution of one or both houses, outlining their mandate, powers, and membership.

=== Membership ===
Members are appointed or elected to committees, often reflecting the party composition of the houses.

=== Meetings ===
Committees meet regularly to conduct their business, which can include hearings, evidence gathering, and deliberations. Sometimes, committees agree their agendas and ways of working, or discuss matters of a sensitive nature, in private meetings but in others they are public.

=== Reports ===
Committees produce reports based on their findings and recommendations, which are then presented to the relevant house or houses.

=== Private Meetings ===
Committees agree their agendas and ways of working, or discuss matters of a sensitive nature, in private meetings.

== Parliamentary privilege ==
In Bunreacht na hÉireann, when addressing a committee in Leinster House, contributors are protected by limited parliamentary privilege, but it is the custom of committees to ask contributors to desist from referring (directly or undeniably) negatively to individuals who are not present at such a committee meeting. Since the increased use of remote meeting software, (from 2020) this privilege for parliamentarians has been limited to those who are "physically present within the confines of Leinster House".

== Impact ==
The work of Oireachtas committees contributes significantly to the effectiveness of the Irish Parliament. Through detailed scrutiny and oversight, committees can:

Improve the quality of legislation.

Enhance government accountability.

Provide a platform for public engagement with policy issues.

By examining issues in depth and holding public officials to account, committees play a vital role in ensuring that the Oireachtas functions effectively as a check on the executive branch of government.

== Proposed constitutional change 2011 ==
The Thirtieth Amendment of the Constitution Bill 2011, put to a referendum in October 2011, sought to empower each House to convene (possibly jointly) committees of inquiry, with powers to compel withness statements, and to make findings against citizens. The referendum was defeated by 53% to 47%. In 2013 a referendum to remove the Seanad proposed extensive changes of committees. This was defeated by 51.7% to 48.3%.

== Current Committees of the Oireachtas ==
There are 35 Committees in the 34th Dáil as of 30 July 2025:

=== Standing committees ===
- Business Committee (Also acts as the Dáil Committee of Selection)
- Committee on Budgetary Oversight
- Committee on Consolidation Bills
- Committee on Members' Interests of Dáil Éireann
- Committee on Parliamentary Privileges and Oversight
- Committee on Standing Orders and Dáil Reform
- Committee of Public Accounts
- Working Group of Committee Cathaoirligh
- Committee of Selection (Seanad Éireann)
- Committee on Parliamentary Privileges and Oversight (Seanad Éireann)

=== Select/Joint Committees ===
- Committee on Agriculture and Food
- Joint Committee on Artificial Intelligence
- Committee on Arts, Media, Communication, Culture and Sport
- Committee on Children and Equality
- Committee on Climate, Environment and Energ
- Committee on Defence and National Security
- Committee on Disability Matters
- Joint Committee on Drugs Use
- Committee on Education and Youth
- Committee on Tourism, Enterprise and Employment
- Committee on European Union Affairs
- Committee on Finance, Public Expenditure, Public Service Reform and Digitalisation and Taoiseach
- Committee on Fishiries and Maritime Affairs
- Committee on Foreign Affairs and Trade
- Committee on Further and Higher Education, Research, Innovation and Science
- Committee on Health
- Committee on Housing, Local Government and Heritage
- Committee on Infrastructure and National Development Plan Delivery
- Committee on Justice, Home Affairs and Migration
- Joint Committee on Key Issues Affecting the Traveller Community
- Joint Committee on Public Petitions and the Ombudsmen
- Committee on Social Protection, Rural and Community Development
- Joint Committee on the Implementation of the Good Friday Agreement
- Committee on the Irish Language, Gaeltacht and the Irish-speaking Community
- Committee on Transport

== Former Committees ==
Joint Committee on Women's Rights: This committee worked to promote women's rights and equality, examining policies and legislation related to women's empowerment.

Joint Committee on Marriage Breakdown: This committee examined issues related to marriage breakdown, working to develop policies and support services for families.

Joint Committee on Tourism, Sport and Recreation: This committee focused on policies related to tourism, sport, and recreation, promoting these sectors and developing strategies for growth.

Joint Committee on the Irish language: This committee worked to promote the Irish language, examining policies and legislation related to language development and support.

Joint Committee on the Secondary Legislation of the European Communities: This committee scrutinized EU secondary legislation, ensuring that Ireland's interests were represented and EU policies were implemented effectively.

Committee of Inquiry into the Banking Crisis (post-2008): This committee investigated the causes and consequences of the banking crisis, working to identify lessons and recommendations for future policy.

Joint Committee on Health and Children: This committee examined policies related to health and children's services, working to promote the health and well-being of children and families.

Joint Committee on Foreign Affairs and Trade: This committee scrutinized foreign policy and trade agreements, working to promote Ireland's interests abroad.

Joint Committee on the Eighth Amendment of the Constitution (32nd Dáil): This committee examined the Eighth Amendment, working to inform the public and develop recommendations for reform.

Joint Committee on Justice and Equality: This committee scrutinized policies related to justice and equality, working to promote fairness and justice in Irish society.

Seanad Special Select Committee on the Withdrawal of the UK from the EU: This committee examined the implications of the UK's withdrawal from the EU, working to inform the public and develop recommendations for policy.
