= Nancy Harris =

Irish playwright and screenwriter

- Education: Trinity College Dublin and the University of Birmingham
- Occupations: Playwright and screenwriter
- Spouse: Kwasi Agyei-Owusu
- Parent(s): Anne and Eoghan Harris
- Writing career
- Notable awards: Rooney Prize for Irish Literature (2012)

Nancy Harris is an Irish playwright and screenwriter. She was awarded the Rooney Prize for Irish Literature in 2012.

== Early life and education ==
Nancy Harris is the daughter of Anne and Eoghan Harris. She was educated at Trinity College Dublin, earning a B.A. in Drama Studies and Classical Civilisation, and the University of Birmingham, where she completed an M.Phil. in Playwriting Studies (a course founded by playwright David Edgar) in the Department of Drama and Theatre Arts.

== Career ==
In 2009, Harris adapted Leo Tolstoy's The Kreutzer Sonata, creating a one-act monologue for the Gate Theatre in Dublin, which was then also presented in New York City in 2012.

Her first original full-length play was No Romance which premiered at The Abbey Theatre in Dublin, which earned her several accolades. Her play Our New Girl, premiered at The Bush Theatre in London in 2013.

In December 2017, the Gate Theatre presented Harris' unique spin on a classic fairytale, about the challenges of reimagining The Red Shoes for a new generation.

Harris had two commissioned plays opening in September 2019: The Beacon for Druid Theatre which premiered at the Town Hall Theatre, Galway before transferring to the Gate Theatre, Dublin in October and Two Ladies for The Bridge theatre, starring Zoë Wanamaker and Zrinka Cvitešić.

Harris wrote the stage musical adaptation of The Magician's Elephant (based on Kate DiCamillo's novel) with Marc Teitler for the Royal Shakespeare Company Having been delayed a year due to the COVID-19 pandemic, it was rescheduled to premiere in winter 2021.

On television, she wrote episodes of the Channel 4 series Dates, and contributed scripts for Secret Diary of a Call Girl, The Good Karma Hospital, and the epic miniseries Troy: Fall of a City.

Harris wrote and created the ITV comedy series The Dry, about a party girl returning home to Ireland to a troubled family. It began broadcast on 5 May 2022. It has been renewed for a second and third series.

Her play Somewhere Out There You opened at the Abbey Theatre in September 2023 as part of Dublin Theatre Festival.

Her play The Beacon is opened in autumn 2024 as an Off-Broadway production by the Irish Repertory Theatre, with actress Kate Mulgrew in the lead.

== Recognition and awards ==
Harris was awarded the 2012 Stewart Parker Trust Award 2012 for her first original full-length play, No Romance. The play was also nominated for an Irish Times Theatre Award, a Zebbie Award, and the Susan Smith Blackburn Prize in 2012.

She was awarded the Rooney Prize for Irish Literature in 2012.

Harris's play Our New Girl and was longlisted for an Evening Standard Award for Most Promising Playwright in 2013.

She was nominated for a BAFTA for her episodes of the Channel 4 series Dates.

== Personal life ==
Harris married Ghanaian scientist, Kwasi Agyei-Owusu. As of 2022 she lives in London.
