= Daniel McConnell (journalist) =

Irish journalist and author

Daniel McConnell is an Irish journalist and author. He has been editor of the Business Post since April 2023. McConnell has previously worked with the Irish Times, Irish Independent, Sunday Independent, Irish Examiner, and the Irish edition of the Sunday Times.

He has been a "commentator on Irish television and radio" and has acted as a stand-in presenter on Today FM's The Last Word With Matt Cooper. In 2016, he and Irish Mail on Sunday political editor John Lee authored a book, Hell at the Gates, on Ireland's financial crash and the Brian Cowen government. In November 2022, McConnell was named Ireland's national journalist of the year and political journalist of the year. He also won "scoop of the year" at the Newsbrands Ireland award ceremony in Dublin. He had previously been named News Analyst of the Year at the 2017 awards.

== Biography ==
Daniel McConnell, who was born in Dublin, attended St Benildus College in Kilmacud and then went on to University College Dublin where he became involved in student politics and both student newspapers the University Observer and the College Tribune.

As editor of the University Observer, along with his colleague Enda Curran, McConnell was named national student editor of the year and won for best newspaper of the year at the 2002 Student Media Awards (Smedias).

He undertook a Masters in Journalism at Dublin City University before commencing work with the Sunday Times. Together with Colm Murphy, McConnell co-authored The Sunday Times Guide to Secondary Schools in Ireland: The Definitive Guide for Parents.

He joined the Irish Times in 2004 as a news reporter, following in his father John's footsteps. John McConnell had written on economic matters for the Times and the Irish Press in the late 1960s and 1970s.

In 2006, Daniel McConnell was hired by Ciaran Byrne at the Sunday Independent under editor Aengus Fanning in 2006, working later under Anne Harris. He spent several years working with Independent News and Media (INM), holding a number of roles at different INM titles. His work at INM included reporting on the Post-2008 Irish banking crisis.

In October 2015, McConnell became political editor of the Irish Examiner ahead of the 2016 Irish general election. In 2016, McConnell and Fiachra O Cionnaith won the Justice Media Award for their reporting on the 'Grace' abuse story in a foster home in the Southeast.

After seven years at the Irish Examiner, McConnell was appointed editor of the Business Post in January 2023, taking up his post in April of the same year. Charged with leading a "major digital transformation" of the organisation, the company announced a strategic restructuring. In July 2023, Swedish media company Bonnier News, part of Bonnier Group, acquired a minority stake in the Business Post.
