= Daniel McConnell =

Daniel McConnell may refer to:

- Daniel McConnell (footballer) (born 1986), Australian rules footballer
- Daniel McConnell (cyclist) (born 1985), Australian cross-country mountain biker
- Daniel McConnell (journalist), Irish journalist and author
