= John Caden =

Irish independent television producer

John Caden is an Irish independent television producer. He began his media career in RTÉ in the 1970s. In 1985 he won a Jacob's Award for producing The Gay Byrne Show.

For most of his time in RTÉ, Caden was a member of the Workers' Party. He, along with his friend Eoghan Harris, strongly supported the operation of Section 31 of the Broadcasting Act 1960, which prevented members of Sinn Féin from being interviewed on RTÉ. In 1987, Caden took charge of the investigation into the "Lambo incident", involving the RTÉ DJ Gerry Ryan.

In the 1990s, John Caden left his employment with RTÉ.

He is the father-in-law of Sunday Independent journalist Brendan O'Connor. He was briefly associated with the campaign of Derek Nally to become President of Ireland in the 1997 Irish presidential election before disassociating himself with the campaign over disagreements with the candidate.
