= Eoghan Harris Twitter scandal =

Scandal in Irish journalism

- Date: May 6, 2021
- Also known as: Barbara J Pym fake Twitter account scandal
- Target: Francine Cunningham; Emma De Souza; Martina Devlin; Colin Harvey; Paul Larkin; Denzil McDaniel; Sarah McInerney; Aoife Moore; Allison Morris; Sean Murray; and others
- Participants: Eoghan Harris

The Eoghan Harris Twitter scandal broke on 6 May 2021, leading the Sunday Independent to stop publishing a weekly column by Eoghan Harris.

== Timeline ==
On 7 May 2021 Twitter suspended a 'Barbara J Pym' (@barbarapym2) and eight linked accounts, followed by suspending another account, making ten in all. All were run anonymously. Three were identified publicly, 'Barbara J Pym', 'Dolly White' (@DollyWh72057454) and 'WhigNorthern' (@whignorthern). The Pym Account was run by Eoghan Harris, Dolly White by his partner Gwen Halley. Harris said a third unnamed account was run by Bridget McIntyre, his sister.

The Pym account was run since February 2020 by Harris and, he said, others he refused to name. It was accused of tweeting strident, sometimes personally abusive and misogynistic, anti-Sinn Féin material. Journalists, a well known academic, two novelists and a filmmaker, plus the partner of the Sunday Independent's publisher, claimed they were targeted. The accounts accused them of promoting Sinn Féin or its agenda. The Pym account frequently praised Harris and supposedly like-minded Sunday Independent colleagues.

Irish Examiner political correspondent Aoife Moore said she was abused over 12 months in more than 120 tweets from two separate accounts. For example, in June 2020 Moore tweeted that Sinn Féin leader Mary Lou McDonald had just taken her seat as the first female leader of the opposition. The Barbara J Pym account replied "So that's what turns you on?" In October 2020 the Pym account tweeted, "Moore thinks she is sniping safely from behind Derry hedges, but she’s actually sniping from an ROI hedge in the Examiner and her SF backside is sticking up in the air." Moore, from Derry, and novelist plus Irish Independent journalist Martina Devlin from Tyrone, were termed 'expats' and 'NordNats' (short for' northern nationalist') because they were born in Northern Ireland (@barbarapym2, 21 April 2021). On 24 October 2020 Pym tweeted: "Martina Devlin, a Northern Nat, resident in the ROI [Republic of Ireland], like another such NordNat resident, Aoife Moore, imports her toxic tribal politics into our Republic". Allison Morris of the Irish News alleged that she was harassed and defamed "for months". She said, “The sustained and obsessive attacks on myself by these accounts occurred at a time and in a manner that was clearly designed to damage my professional reputation.” She added: “As a female journalist and commentator, the posts also had a deeply misogynist tone to them, all too common on social media. Women working in the media are not fair game for those who wish to control every aspect of our profession and dictate who is entitled to a platform.”

On 29 March 2021 Journalist and novelist Paul Larkin was attacked by 'Barbara J. Pym' and also by 'Dolly White', after the Irish Times published Larkin's review of Brendan O'Leary's three-volume, A Treatise on Northern Ireland. Pym tweeted, "How can the Irish Times justify publishing this Provo sectarian poison? Why was Larkin not asked to tone down the tribal rhetoric?" Larkin noted similarities with a subsequent, 4 April, Eoghan Harris column in the Sunday Independent. On 15 April Larkin's solicitors, KRW Law, threatened Twitter with legal action if the company did not reveal the owner or owners of the Pym account. On 7 May Niall Murphy of KRW Law spoke on RTE Radio One Drivetime. He reported that a week earlier Paul Larkin communicated to the Sunday Independent his correct suspicion that Eoghan Harris operated the Barbara J Pym account. KRW Law demanded that Twitter release details of all nine allegedly linked accounts and of a tenth, 'WhigNorthern', account. Twitter afterwards suspended nine accounts linked to and including the Pym account.

The WhigNorthern account targeted, amongst others, Francine Cunningham, partner of Sunday Independent publisher Peter Vandermeersch. Cunningham observed:

- "For anyone who hasn’t seen it, the stated purpose of @WhigNorthern is to track Sinn Fein’s “subversive influence on Irish media.” Over the last year it first targeted me directly by name: “Francine Cunningham has always been at the extreme end of radical nationalist politics” and claimed I was the ex-wife of someone I have never met who was also deemed to be suspect."
- "On another occasion, WhigNorthern wrote: “Francine Cunningham, from Strabane Co Tyrone, formerly of the Sunday Tribune, carried a lot of hard northern nationalist baggage into the ST, and is now depositing some of it in the Belfast Telegraph, Irish Indo and Sindo.” Yet I never wrote for the Sunday Tribune and in the early part of my career was an arts journalist for the Irish Times and Sunday Business Post. Two decades spent abroad and two law degrees later, I now work for an international law firm. At other points the anonymous Twitter account refers to the “new Francine Cunningham pro-SF line in INM [Independent News Media] titles"."

Film maker Seán Murray, director the collusion documentary Unquiet Graves, announced that he too was taking legal action. He reported also that two prominent journalists were engaged in an associated smear campaign. Another target, writer and Irish citizenship campaigner Emma DeSouza from Derry, commented, “I’m surprised to see so many defenders of online abuse and harassment in the aftermath of the Eoghan Harris scandal. Much of the abuse was levied at Northern Ireland nationalists, or those deemed nationalists by Harris. One need only look at the comments to see the sectarianism and misogyny.”

=== Identification of Harris ===
On 6 May it was announced that Harris would no longer write for the Sunday Independent. The Pym account shared pre-publication details of a 2 May Sunday Independent poll on a United Ireland. As he was one of a small group with prior access to poll data, Harris was questioned soon after the tweet appeared. He apologised and the tweet was quickly deleted.

Harris admitted use of the Barbara J. Pym account to Sunday Independent editor Alan English, who described the columnist's position as "untenable". English said that "Regardless of where they stand on any issue, we expect our writers to put their views across in a transparent manner. Readers can agree or disagree with these opinions. We will not, however, tolerate hidden agendas." English noted Irish Examiner journalist Aoife Moore stating that the Pym account had contributed "sexualised messages about whether Mary Lou McDonald 'turned me on', the size of my arse and called me a terrorist from the month I started at the Examiner. Since then, I’ve had to go to counselling and the guards." English described these attacks on Moore as "contemptible". He referred also to attacks on the partner of the newspaper's publisher.

On 7 May 2021 Twitter announced that a further 8 accounts linked to 'Barbara J Pym' had been suspended. Twitter announced that the accounts had breached "policy on platform manipulation and spam".

=== Response ===
After admitting use of the Barbara J Pym account, Harris said it was run by a "team of five or six people", consisting of elderly trade unionists, historians and business people. He refused to name them, saying he did not want to "get them shot".

Harris denied that the Pym account had sent Aoife Moore "sexualised" messages, though Moore did not claim that messages were sent privately. Harris said "Furthermore, I also categorically deny that Aoife Moore was ever called a “terrorist” on Barbara J Pym, as she claims, and I call on her to show a screen grab of any tweet supporting her charge." Moore had cited the Pym account accusing her of "sniping safely from behind Derry hedges, but she’s actually sniping from an ROI hedge". Harris claimed that the messages Moore mentioned were "clearly political and could equally be applied to a man". He said that unnamed "women on the Pym site" did not regard the tweets as offensive. He also said that Moore had received "scores" of critical messages, not just from the Pym account. Ruth Dudley Edwards and by Ben Lowry defended Harris in the Belfast Newsletter. On 15 May in an Irish Times letter Harris, referring to himself as a "78-year-old man with terminal cancer", denied that attacks on Grace Moore were sexualised and defended hiding his identity. He regretted using the term "backside". He said, "Sinn Féin has mobilised its social media army to gender a political issue and ruin my reputation by depicting me as a misogynist.". Naming one other suspended account, he observed:

- "I have only one Twitter account, Barbara J Pym. I suspect the other accounts were suspended because they supported my anti-Sinn Féin views. In fact I only know two of these suspended account holders, both strong women, who share my loathing of Sinn Féin and are well able to articulate that abhorrence. One is my sister, Bridget McIntyre, the other is “Dolly White” who tells me she's soon going public because she's sick of the misogynistic smear that she is really me."

Sunday Independent Editor Alan English reported on 9 May 2021,

- “I told [Eoghan Harris] I suspected his involvement in other anonymous accounts and that I proposed to name a few of them. Dolly White, he said, was “definitely not me”. He claimed ‘Dolly’ was a former student of his, a woman in her 40s who had the ability to get inside his head and know what he was thinking. Further, the tweets were written in a way that was “not my prose style”, he said. I disagreed with this. I then named Northern Whig. Again, he said it was not him, but he had “a good idea of who it might be”.”

On 16 May Eoghan Harris's partner Gwen Halley stated that she was 'Dolly White'. She said, “I’m a shy, private person. I wanted to cut down on the amount of Sinn Fein badgering I would get if I went under my own name.”

=== Drivetime interview ===
In a radio interview on RTÉ Drivetime on 7 May, Harris discussed founding the account with five others, including "trade unionists, historians and businesspeople". He said he had been a close friend of Ulster Volunteer Force members David Ervine and Gusty Spence, who are deceased. The Ervine claim was contested. He wanted to assure loyalists in Northern Ireland that people in the Republic, for whom Harris spoke, had no agenda against them. He said he would not name the others involved, "given Sinn Féin’s sinister links". Harris told Sarah McInerney that no other journalists or politicians were involved and that those running it were of the "older generation".

He said there was a long history of journalists using pseudonyms and that it wasn't problematic. When asked about his 2008 comment describing anonymous Internet commentators as "little wankers masturbating in a room", Harris replied, "That was then. That was before Sinn Féin culled that huge vote in the election".

Harris said he admitted his involvement with the account, "because I am proud of the tweets which are mostly addressed to loyalists, the most recent of them urging restraint on protests against the [post-Brexit Northern Ireland] Protocol and assuring working class unionists that most of us in the Republic have no malign agenda against their heritage and political freedoms."

Harris denied involvement with any other accounts, saying he would "have to be superman" to run so many. He further denied regretting his involvement: "I would have had to find an outlet to deal with Northern Ireland one way or another. It is my life". Harris denied praising his own work in his personal use of the account.

=== Response from others ===
Aoife Moore, Emma De Souza and Sarah McInerney (during her interview with Harris) announced that, as a result of attacks, they had 'muted' the Pym account. Martina Devlin reported her personal upset in relation to Pym account attacks.

Harris's sacking was welcomed by People before Profit and Terry Prone who described Harris as "a ruthless demagogue who never considered the possibility that he might be wrong about anything".

=== Lawsuit ===
Alongside Paul Larkin and Sean Murray, Aoife Moore and Allison Morris are undertaking legal action against Harris and Twitter. They were joined by Denzil McDaniel, a former editor of the Impartial Reporter in Enniskillen, Colin Harvey, a professor of human rights law at Queen's University, and citizenship campaigner Emma deSouza. The Twitter accounts associated with Harris are subject to a Norwich Pharmacal order, requiring disclosure of information to applicants undertaking legal proceedings. Morris's solicitor sought "full disclosure of each and every targeted account pertaining to Mr Harris directly and from Twitter" in the High Court in Dublin. Moore's solicitor said she "will take all the steps necessary to protect her reputation and will not be deterred as a young female journalist by the actions of men operating faceless Twitter accounts."

In March 2023 Harris took an appeal against his defamation case against Moore being transferred to the High Court. The following month, his appeal was dismissed.
