= Eoghan Harris =

Irish former senator and journalist (born 1943)

Senator
- In office 13 September 2007 – 25 May 2011
- Constituency: Nominated by the Taoiseach

Personal details
- Born: 13 March 1943 (age 83) Douglas, County Cork, Ireland
- Party: Independent
- Other political affiliations: Workers' Party; Fianna Fáil
- Spouses: Gwendoline Halley; Anne Harris (div.)
- Education: University College Cork

Eoghan Harris (born 13 March 1943) is an Irish journalist, columnist, director, and former politician. He has held posts in various and diverse political parties. He was a leading theoretician in the Marxist-Leninist Workers' Party (previously Official Sinn Féin). Harris was a fierce critic of Provisional Sinn Féin, from which they had split, and became an opponent of Irish republicanism. For much of the Troubles, from the 1970s until the 1990s, Harris worked in Raidió Teilifís Éireann (RTÉ) and was influential in shaping the current affairs output of Ireland's national broadcaster. Later he began writing for the Sunday Independent newspaper.

In the 1990s, he left the Workers' Party and was a short-lived adviser to Fine Gael leader John Bruton, before Bruton became Taoiseach; then an adviser to the Ulster Unionist Party. In the 2000s he supported the Fianna Fáil–led government of Bertie Ahern. Ahern nominated him to Seanad Éireann in 2007, where he served until 2011. He also continued producing some documentary programmes for RTÉ.

Harris was a columnist for the Sunday Independent until 2021. He was sacked after admitting to running a fake Twitter account, which harassed journalists he believed were sympathetic to Irish nationalism and Sinn Féin.

Harris is also involved in screenwriting work. He lectures at IADT Dún Laoghaire and teaches a screenwriting workshop.

== Early life ==
Harris was born in Douglas, County Cork, a village on the outskirts of Cork city, on 13 March 1943. He was educated at Presentation Brothers College, and subsequently at University College Cork (UCC), where he studied English and History.

== Career ==
=== Poblacht Chríostúil ===
In the Cork Mid by-election in March 1965 he campaigned for Sylvester Cotter, who was standing for Poblacht Chríostúil. At this time Harris met his future wife, UCC student Anne O'Sullivan. The aim of the party was "to base the social and economic policies of our country on Christian social reform, as elaborated by the last six Popes."

=== Sinn Féin to Workers' Party ===
Harris was a leading Irish republican in Sinn Féin in the 1960s, and was an important influence in the party's move from Irish nationalism to Marxism, a political ideology which Harris later said he abhorred. During the 1970 split of the movement into Provisional Sinn Féin and Official Sinn Féin, he was close to leading Official Sinn Féin members Eamonn Smullen and Cathal Goulding, the latter of whom was at the time Chief of Staff of the paramilitary Official Irish Republican Army. Alongside Smullen, who had spent many years in British prisons for IRA activities, Harris worked in the Republican Industrial Development Division, an organisation set up in 1972 by Seamus Costello to co-ordinate trade union activities, along with John Caden, Des Geraghty and others. He was or has claimed to be a key advisor to Tomas MacGiolla during the famous 1970 Sinn Fein Ard Fheis.

According to Henry Patterson in his book The Politics of Illusion, Harris's pamphlet Irish Industrial Revolution (1975) was influential in shifting the party away from republicanism. Harris continued to do media work for it as it became the Workers' Party. However, in 1990 he published a pamphlet entitled The Necessity of Social Democracy in which he surmised that socialism would not survive the Revolutions of 1989. He called for a shift to social democracy and that the party should seek a historic compromise with the social democratic wings of Fine Gael and the Labour Party. The document was initially submitted by Eamonn Smullen on Harris's behalf for publication in the party's theoretical magazine Making Sense, but when this was refused, Harris and Smullen published it themselves as a publication of the party's Economic Affairs Department, of which Smullen was head. When the pamphlet began to circulate it was banned by the Workers' Party, and Smullen was suspended from his position on the committee. Harris resigned in protest and Smullen resigned subsequently, along with many of the members of the Research Section of the party. This was the prelude to a bigger split in 1992 when senior members alleged that the supposedly moribund Official IRA still existed and was implicated in criminality, and sought to move to some extent in the direction proposed earlier by Harris. The extent to which Harris was the genesis of the involvement from New Agenda to Democratic Left is a matter of dispute. Indeed he had arguably left the organisation completely by then but later claimed credit for its political development and continued stance on Northern Ireland policy.

In 2006, during an RTÉ Television debate Harris stated that the leaders of the Easter Rising were "suicide bombers, I mean suicide terrorists".

=== Inside RTÉ for the Workers' Party ===
During the 1970s until the start of the 1990s, Harris was for a time a central figure in shaping the current affairs output of RTÉ. He pushed the organisation towards a perspective heavily critical of Sinn Féin and the Provisional IRA. It was stated in the November 1997 issue of Magill magazine that he set up an RTÉ branch of the Workers' Party called the "Ned Stapleton Cumann", which gave the party considerable influence in RTÉ. Michael O'Leary, then leader of the Labour Party, commented that RTÉ current affairs coverage was "Stickie orientated", a reference to the Official IRA, from which the Provisional IRA had split in the 1970s. Those who supported Harris within RTÉ became known as "the brood of Harris". The tensions within the organisation, between journalists such as Mary McAleese and Alex White on one side and the Workers' Party members on the other, led to major disagreements at the station and to criticism of what was perceived as its anti-republican political agenda. Harris recruited Charlie Bird (then a member of Official Sinn Féin) and Marian Finucane to RTÉ in the 1970s. Joe Little was also a member as named in The Lost Revolution: The Story of the Official IRA & The Worker's Party.

=== 1990 presidential campaign ===
The Labour Party and the Workers' Party jointly nominated former senator Mary Robinson to be their candidate for President of Ireland at the 1990 presidential election. While Harris's strategy proposal is thought, by some, to have been significant in the rebranding of Robinson, just how influential he was, remains a matter of much controversy. Robinson and her campaign team blamed him for a near-fatal change in tactics: having previously been non-combative in dealing with the controversies that had engulfed the recently dismissed Tánaiste Brian Lenihan, Harris pressured Robinson into going on the offensive on a live debate on the current affairs programme Today Tonight. This action was generally seen to have backfired horribly. Harris made three election videos for the Robinson campaign, and claims to have been responsible for a memorable line from her acceptance speech: "the hand that rocked the cradle rocked the system." Robinson won the election, becoming Ireland's first female President. However, Ruairi Quinn, credited him in his autobiography for the editorship of her three RTE broadcasts during that presidential election.

=== 1991 Fine Gael Ardfheis ===
After the Robinson campaign, Harris was asked to work for Fine Gael by its leader, John Bruton. However, he received criticism from both within and outside the party in April 1991, when he wrote the script for a sketch for the Fine Gael Ardfheis in which a cleaner (played by the comedy actress Twink) interrupted the leader's speech. The sketch was criticised as being in bad taste and tacky, particularly in its references to a controversial incident that had made the news, wherein a female reporter from RTÉ had allegedly been groped by an inebriated Fianna Fáil TD. Its catchphrase Úna gan a gúna ("Úna without her dress" in Irish) was deemed sexist and demeaning to a victim of alleged improper conduct.

=== Northern Ireland peace process ===
Harris, along with fellow Sunday Independent columnist Eamon Dunphy, became an outspoken critic of Social Democratic and Labour Party leader John Hume over Hume's decision to hold talks with Sinn Féin prior to an IRA ceasefire. Harris urged the Irish government, at the time led by his friend John Bruton, to end all support for Hume's peace efforts. He wrote, "If we persist with the peace process it will end with sectarian slaughter in the North, with bombs in Dublin, Cork and Galway, and with the ruthless reign by provisional gangs over the ghettos of Dublin. The only way to avoid this abyss is to cut the cord to John Hume". Hume argued that he was seeking to convince republicans to abandon violence. Harris praised the resulting Good Friday Agreement. Hume and David Trimble won the Nobel Peace Prize in 1998 for their efforts. Harris became an advisor in the late 1990s to Trimble, the then leader of the Ulster Unionist Party. He wrote some of Trimble's speeches, one of which included the line that Northern Ireland had been "a cold house for Catholics." He was invited to address the UUP annual conference in 1999, where he described the Belfast Agreement as "an Amazing Grace" and urged the UUP to make a leap of faith in Sinn Féin. They eventually did so, forming a power-sharing executive, although it was later suspended on the issue of the failure of the IRA to decommission its arms. Having coined the phrase "Fellow-travellers" regarding the Hume-Adams strategy which involved Trade Union negotiators from the ROI, the Redemptorist Order and the Fianna Fáil party he refused to withdraw any comments following the death of Hume. Dunphy, by contrast has done so.

=== Iraq War ===
Harris strongly supported the 2003 invasion of Iraq, and is unrepentant about its morality, writing in the Sunday Independent that "hindsight history has no moral status". In May 2003, he wrote "Already, as I predicted in the lead up to the war, the neoconservative hawks have done much better than the liberals in getting down to the dynamics of opening up the gulf to democracy. Already, and this I predicted too, there is substantial hope for an Israeli–Palestinian settlement now that Saddam no longer scowls at Israel". Commenting in November 2003 about the English journalist Robert Fisk, he wrote: "Far from wanting to pour venom on Fisk, I think he does us a favour by being so forthright. For my money, his analysis of Middle East politics is a first cousin to believing that aliens take away people in flying saucers." He has also referenced the phrase "fisking" though Harris' own fact-checking record is a matter for dispute on several occasions including his political chameleonic journey.

Harris gave media training to Iraqi politician Ahmed Chalabi in advance of the invasion of Iraq, and wrote in the Irish Independent that:

I first met Chalabi in Washington in March 2001, in the company of Richard Perle, a few months after George W Bush had been elected, and met later in London where I gave him some media training. We bonded from the start, and the basis of the bond was his instinctive feel for Ireland.

Chalabi was one of the sources of the false intelligence that Iraq had weapons of mass destruction.

=== Relationship with Fianna Fáil ===
In 1997, Harris denounced Fianna Fáil presidential candidate Mary McAleese, calling her a "tribal time bomb" and writing "if she wins not on a technicality but because so many people gave her their number one, then I am living in a country I no longer understand." McAleese won, and Harris later expressed regret for his sentiments and praised her presidency.

Harris in the mid-2000s began endorsing the centrist, populist Fianna Fáil, which was in a coalition government with the Progressive Democrats. Harris was one of a minority of journalists to support Bertie Ahern during the "Bertiegate I" crisis, during which questions were raised over Ahern's financial propriety. Harris heavily supported Ahern and Fianna Fáil in the 2007 general election and did so publicly on a Late Late Show before the election with Eamon Dunphy who adopted the latter position. Some alleged that the Sunday Independent's editorial stance prior to the election amounted to a U-turn from previous criticism of the government, but Harris explicitly denied there had been any U-turn or that the attitude of journalists at the paper was influenced by an alleged meeting between the deputy leader of Fianna Fáil, Brian Cowen and the owner of Independent News & Media, Tony O'Reilly.

Shortly before the election, Harris appeared on The Late Late Show on RTÉ, in which he praised Ahern and poured scorn on those criticising him over his personal finances. Harris's Late Late Show appearance coincided with a rise in support for the Government. Harris also claimed that other newspapers, namely The Irish Times and The Irish Daily Mail waged an anti-Ahern campaign. All other news outlets dismissed the claim, with most accusing Harris and the Sunday Independent of doing its own U-turn following a Cowen-O'Reilly meeting. The paper had previously been highly critical of Ahern's failure to reform stamp duty, but after the meeting, this criticism stopped. Fine Gael blame this intervention for them losing that election. Soon thereafter Fianna Fáil promised to carry such reform if re-elected. In February 2008, Director-General of RTÉ Cathal Goan and RTÉ director of news, Ed Mulhall appeared before the Oireachtas Committee on Communications. Both men stated that they were "uncomfortable" about Harris's appearance on The Late Late Show as it took place so soon before the election.

On 26 May 2007 Harris appeared on an election special debate on Today FM's The Last Word with Matt Cooper. During the debate, Harris said that the decision to support the Government was taken because "we got what we wanted on stamp duty". Where Fintan O'Toole denied Harris's claims of a campaign by The Irish Times against Ahern, and accused the Sunday Independent of having its own political agenda. Harris left the studio mid-debate.

==== Seanad Éireann ====
Ahern nominated Harris to Seanad Éireann on 3 August 2007, where he served until April 2011. He accepted no Senate Salary at the time though remained a salaried journalist and occasional producer with Gregg Productions.

On the RTÉ Radio 1 programme News at One on 3 December 2007, Harris strongly defended Bertie Ahern, saying that the Irish Daily Mail was a "lying newspaper", which practised "sensationalist, sick journalism" and which had a "record of fascist appeasement in the 1930s". He also said that the Mahon Tribunal should be shut down because "there is no natural justice available", and that in ten years' time "people will look back and say that the Tribunal time was scoundrel time". The Irish Daily Mail denied his allegations. In a debate with Fintan O'Toole on the RTÉ TV Primetime programme on 4 December 2007, Harris further alleged that "the entire [Mahon] Tribunal is a fantasy of [Tom] Gilmartin".

During an interview with Ursula Halligan on the TV3 programme The Political Party broadcast on 9 December 2007, Harris threatened to walk out because he did not wish to further discuss Bertie Ahern's appearances at the Mahon Tribunal. He then changed his mind and asked that the programme be re-recorded, but Halligan informed him that this was not possible.

=== 2000s and 2010s media career ===
Harris wrote a column for the Sunday Independent. Harris worked at Raidió Teilifís Éireann (RTÉ), the Irish national television broadcaster, on current affairs programmes such as 7 Days and Féach. He also made a documentary on mental illness, entitled Darkness Visible.

In 2004, an angry RTÉ viewer, Kilmacud Crokes player Hugh Gannon, confronted Harris regarding the Sunday Independent's editorial. This happened after an episode of Questions and Answers, with Gannon implying Harris was a lackey for Tony O'Reilly. Harris reacted angrily to this, dismissed Gannon as a "Shinner" and presenter John Bowman had to step in to separate the two men. Bowman suggested that the men agree to disagree, but Gannon, a 1998 Leinster Minor Hurling Championship medallist and staunch Fine Gael supporter, suggested: "No. Let's agree that you agree with me."

Harris was featured on the front cover of the August 2007 edition of Village. Inside, Harris was the subject of a number of critical articles written by Vincent Browne. There is a long history here as Browne, through Magill initially and other media organs was one of the few brave enough to question the role of the Harris policy in RTE and its role in balanced journalism with resulting political consequences.

In 2008, Harris defended the Irish-language poet Cathal Ó Searcaigh, who admitted buying gifts for and having sex with 16 to 18-year-old boys while on charitable visits to Nepal. Harris said that while he didn't "necessarily approve of people going to Nepal for sex with young men", Ó Searcaigh's critics had "made no distinction between paedophilia (sex with children below the age of puberty) and paederasty (sex with youths aged 16-18)." Harris pointed out that Ó Searcaigh's sexual preference was common among the great philosophers of Ancient Greece, and that the age of consent in Nepal is 16. He also wrote that Nepal is a notoriously homophobic society and that some of the accusers may have their own agendas.

In 2011, Harris voiced strong antagonistic views towards the Croke Park Agreement, arguing that the levels of pay it guarantees to public sector workers are "choking social solidarity".

Harris continued to supply programme material to RTÉ through Praxis Pictures Ltd., the independent film company he runs with Gerry Gregg, formerly an RTÉ and Workers' Party associate. In 2012 RTÉ upheld a complaint against a Praxis documentary, An Tost Fada (The Long Silence), written and narrated by Harris, and produced and directed by Gregg. The programme subject matter concerned Harris's controversial belief that some actions in the Irish War of Independence were sectarian, and involved the IRA targeting Protestants. Previously, in 2007, Harris participated in an equally controversial programme, Guns and Neighbours: The Killings at Coolacrease (Reel Story Productions), in which it was alleged that two Protestant farmers in County Offaly, killed by the IRA in June 1920, were killed for sectarian reasons. This school of history has long promoted the thesis of Dr Peter Hart regarding the Kilmichael Ambush which has been much disputed in History Ireland and in numerous publications.

It was reported in The Sunday Times (Irish edition) that Harris was at the centre of an internal investigation at the National Film School in Dún Laoghaire, where he lectures. Harris has also incorrectly, albeit accidentally, said he received a Silver Bear Award at the Berlin International Film Festival in his entry in 'Who's Who' in Ireland, for his documentary Darkness Visible. Harris insisted that he did win the award, saying that the Berlin Film Festival "mustn't keep proper records". The award he actually received is the Prix Futura, awarded at the Berlin Television Festival. He has since corrected the mistake.

Harris has written in the Sunday Independent about Wikipedia, an online encyclopedia. He was a judge on the Irish language talent show Glas Vegas, on TG4.

Harris also wrote seven screenplays for Sharpe, which starred Sean Bean and Daragh O'Malley, the ITV adaptation of Bernard Cornwell's Napoleonic War historical fiction series. In the official boxset interview Harris states: "He found it a useful way to expound his views on Anglo-Irish relations (sic.)"

He also claimed he intended to publish a biography of Michael Collins but was discouraged to do so by members of the Collins family based on rumours he heard in West Cork that he was going to print but insinuated in his newspaper column.

== Twitter scandal ==
On 6 May 2021 it was announced that his contract with the Sunday Independent had been terminated: this action was taken after he admitted using a fake Twitter account, under the name "Barbara J. Pym". The account had been set up in February 2020. The editor, Alan English, described his position as "untenable", saying that "Regardless of where they stand on any issue, we expect our writers to put their views across in a transparent manner. Readers can agree or disagree with these opinions. We will not, however, tolerate hidden agendas." Irish Examiner journalist Aoife Moore stated that the Pym account had contributed "sexualised messages about whether Mary Lou McDonald 'turned me on', the size of my arse and called me a terrorist from the month I started at the Examiner. Since then, I've had to go to counselling and the guards". English described attacks by the Pym account on Aoife Moore as "contemptible".

An account associated with Barbara J Pym, 'WhigNorthern', targeted Francine Cunningham, wife of Sunday Independent publisher, Peter Vandermeersch. She observed, "For anyone who hasn't seen it, the stated purpose of @WhigNorthern is to track Sinn Fein's "subversive influence on Irish media." Over the last year, it first targeted me directly by name: "Francine Cunningham has always been at the extreme end of radical nationalist politics" and claimed I was the ex-wife of someone I have never met who was also deemed to be suspect."

On 15 April 2021 Twitter was threatened with legal action by lawyers acting for journalist and novelist Paul Larkin if the company did not reveal the owner or owners of the Pym account. Larkin was attacked by 'Barbara J. Pym' on 29 March and by an associated 'Dolly White' account, when the Irish Times published his review of Brendan O'Leary's three-volume A Treatise on Northern Ireland. Pym tweeted, "How can the Irish Times justify publishing this Provo sectarian poison? Why was Larkin not asked to tone down the tribal rhetoric?" Larkin's solicitors noted similarities with a 4 April Eoghan Harris column in the Sunday Independent.

On 7 May 2021 Twitter announced that a further eight accounts linked to "Barbara J. Pym" had been suspended. Twitter announced that the accounts had breached "policy on platform manipulation and spam".

Harris's sacking was welcomed by People before Profit and Terry Prone who described Harris as "a ruthless demagogue who never considered the possibility that he might be wrong about anything".

It remains unclear if Harris was still an unofficial political advisor to Micheal Martin particularly regarding his policy on Northern Ireland.

== Personal life ==
Harris's ex-wife, Anne Harris, was formerly editor of the Sunday Independent. In December 2007, Harris married Gwendoline Halley, from Waterford. He is an atheist.

Harris has had prostate cancer. Writing in the 3 May 2020 edition of the Sunday Independent, Harris stated that his cancer had returned. Harris had written his previous column from an emergency department in a Dublin hospital. Sworn enemies wished him well, with Fergus Finlay writing in the Irish Examiner: "Eoghan Harris’s self-aggrandisement might drive me nuts at times, but contrary as he is, his would be a voice that we would all miss if it was forced to be quiet for too long".

His brother, Joe, served as a member of Cork County Council from 2014 to 2019, initially as an independent and later for the Social Democrats.

== See also ==
- John Caden

== Sources ==
- Irish Daily Mail – 7 May 2007
- Magill – November 1997
- Sunday Independent – 11 May 2003
- Sunday Independent – 23 November 2003
- The Sunday Times (Irish edition) – 26 August 2007
