= Aengus Fanning =

Irish journalist and editor

Aengus Fanning (22 April 1942 – 17 January 2012) was an Irish journalist and editor of the Sunday Independent from 1984 until his death in 2012. Originally from Tralee in County Kerry, he was also a former editor of farming for the Irish Independent. Fanning was listed at number 31 on a list of "most influential people" in Irish society compiled for Village magazine.

== Early life ==
Fanning was boss and friend to the deceased journalist Veronica Guerin. Fanning's family owned the Irish local newspaper The Midland Tribune.

Fanning was a graduate of University College Cork (UCC).

He also had a keen interest in sport, having represented Kerry in Gaelic football in his youth - cricket was also a passion of his. He also played the clarinet, and was a jazz fan.

== Career ==
Fanning took over editing the Sunday Independent in 1984 from Michael Hand. Under Fanning's leadership, the newspaper adopted what Irish newspaper historian John Horgan called a "new emphasis on pungent opinion columns, gossip and fashion" which resulted in the paper overtaking its main rival, The Sunday Press. For a time, Fanning's deputy editor was journalist Anne Harris.

In a 1993 interview with Ivor Kenny in the book Talking to Ourselves, Fanning described himself as a classical liberal who was opposed to both Ulster loyalist and Provisional IRA terrorism. Fanning also expressed a strong advocacy of the free market, arguing that the goal of a good newspaper is to be as commercially successful as possible:

"If three or four papers out of 15 are successful and the others are not, they might say they're not driven by the market, they have some higher vocation: to serve the public interest or some pompous stuff like that. That's how they feel good about themselves. Fair enough, if that's how they want to explain the world. It's a grand excuse for relative failure... I think we live or die by the market, it will always win through."

Fanning recruited a number of noted writers to contribute to the newspaper, including historians Conor Cruise O'Brien and Ronan Fanning, journalists Shane Ross and Gene Kerrigan, poet Anthony Cronin and novelist Colm Tóibín. However, his editorship was not without controversy; the columns published by Eamon Dunphy and Terry Keane drew criticism. Foley noted some Irish commentators criticised Fanning's Sunday Independent, claiming the newspaper was publishing "a mix of sleaze and prurience".

Fanning also defended the controversial Mary Ellen Synon, who called the Paralympics games 'perverse'. One of the more bizarre incidents occurred in 2001 when Fanning was involved in a fisticuffs with a colleague at the newspaper - operations editor Campbell Spray.

Two of Fanning's three sons by his first wife, Mary – Dion and Evan – wrote for the Sunday Independent. He died of cancer in January 2012, aged 69, and is survived by his second wife, Anne Harris, also of the Sunday Independent.
