= Stephen Rae (editor) =

Former editor of the Irish Independent (2012 to 2018)

Stephen Rae (born 1966) is the former group editor-in-chief of INM newspaper publishers, including the Irish Independent, Ireland's largest national newspaper, from 2012–2018.

== Biography ==
Born on the Dingle Peninsula in County Kerry, on the south west Atlantic coast of Ireland Rae attended the DIT School of Journalism, qualified as a barrister-at-law at King's Inns, Dublin, has a qualification in Criminology from DIT, and received the Directors’ Programme Award in Business and Leadership from the Management School, Cranfield University, UK.

== Career ==
He was Young Journalist of the Year in 1985 and subsequently became a freelance journalist for a range of national newspapers. He spent a period as editor of the Garda Review (the monthly magazine of the national police force), before becoming crime correspondent for the Evening Herald. Rae became acting editor of the Evening Herald in September 2005, before being appointed editor in May 2006.

In 2012, Rae was appointed the editor of the Irish Independent, Ireland's largest selling national newspaper. At the Irish Independent he oversaw what became known as the "Anglo Tapes" investigation which was published in June 2013. The investigation which told the inside story of the collapse of Anglo-Irish Bank made international headlines and dominated political debate for weeks. German Chancellor Angela Merkel also commented on the investigation. The investigation won the title a number of awards. He was later promoted to group editor-in-chief. While editor of the Irish Independent, Rae oversaw the ending of its publication as a broadsheet and the development of its online news site which recorded average audiences of 12,000,000 monthly users. In January 2017 he was appointed to the Board of the World Editors Forum European Commissioner Mariya Gabriel appointed Rae to the Commission's High Level Expert Group on Online Disinformation the following year The Government of Ireland May 2019 appointed him to the board of Shannon Group plc, the company which oversees Ireland's International Aviation Services Centre (IASC), Shannon Airport and Shannon Commercial Properties

On 23 May 2018, Rae announced he would be stepping down from his post at INM on completion of his five year term. In June 2019 Rae was elected to the Supervisory Board of the World Association of Newspapers and News Publishers, WAN-IFRA

== Decisions ==
In July 1997 Rae reported on the front page of the Evening Herald newspaper that "a prominent politician was today at the centre of a garda investigation over planning bribe allegations. Gardai have launched an inquiry into claims the person was given £30,000 in return for a land rezoning issue." The story which said "the probe was ordered after a witness came forward and alleged he was present for the handover of £30,000 to the public representative" was one of the first by a journalist into the planning scandal that led to the establishment of the Mahon Tribunal. As editor-in-chief at INM, he reportedly fired journalist Gemma O'Doherty after she made an attempt to interview Garda Commissioner Martin Callinan. at his home at 10pm, 11 April 2013. This was ignored by the mainstream media in Ireland, as noted by media in Great Britain. It was later claimed that Rae himself was among those to have had penalty points annulled. These claims were ignored by the Irish media and only reported either on social media or internationally.

On the evening of Saturday 19 July 2014, Rae, in his role as group editor of INM, reportedly ordered the presses to be stopped to amend a column written by Sunday Independent editor Anne Harris, which featured references to Denis O'Brien. He never ordered the presses stopped. He did seek to have included clarified information. Copies of the original article appeared allowing comparisons. Harris originally wrote: "Denis O'Brien is the major shareholder in INM. In theory, with 29% of the shares, he does not control it. In practice, he does." The last sentence was deleted and the wording of the next paragraph about O'Brien was also amended. Representatives of O'Brien later demanded a retraction and apology from Ms Harris. A prominent apology to O'Brien from Ms. Harris appeared in the Sunday Independent on 3 August 2014. Harris left the newspaper in December 2014, with praise from some colleagues. The following month Cormac Bourke was appointed editor of the Sunday Independent

== Departure ==
In May 2018 Rae and INM announced he was leaving the media group after a career of 24 years at the company and five years as Group Editor-in-Chief His decision to step down came a few months after as chief editor he greenlighted the publication over several days of an investigative series which exposed wrongdoings at the media company and alleged activity by the company's own former chairman. The Sunday Independent reported how the company "interrogated" data belonging to journalists and other prominent figures off site leading to an investigation by the ODCE The report was by the journalists Dearbhail McDonald, Shane Phelan and Samantha McCaughren who won a journalistic award for their investigative series Prior to stepping down and after overseeing the publication of the investigative series Rae implemented a "Triple Lock" system to ensure that journalists' data at INM would never again be accessed by the commercial arm of the company without a rigorous triple lock mechanism being triggered involving the knowledge and authorisation of three senior executives, including the Editor-in-Chief and Managing Editor Rae is involved in digital media projects as advisor and investor including San Francisco headquartered climate newsletter Callaway Climate Insights
