= Rupert Pennant-Rea =

British businessman and journalist

- Born: Rupert Lascelles Pennant-Rea; 23 January 1948 (age 78)
- Education: Peterhouse Boys' School
- Alma mater: Trinity College, Dublin; University of Manchester
- Occupations: Economist, businessman, journalist
- Known for: The Economist, The Bank of England,
- Notable work: The Economist Economics, Pocket Economics, Who Runs the Economy, novel Gold Foil
- Spouses: Helen Jay (m. 1986; div. 2009) Cinzia De Santis (m. 2011)
- Children: 4
- Parents: Peter Pennant-Rea (father); Pauline Pennant-Rea (mother)

Rupert Lascelles Pennant-Rea (born 23 January 1948) is a British businessman, journalist, and former Deputy Governor of the Bank of England. He was editor of The Economist newspaper and later Chairman of The Economist Group.

== Early life ==
The son of aeronautical engineer Peter Athelwold Pennant-Rea (1914-2007), MBE, at one time head of Rhodesian civil aviation, and Pauline Elizabeth, daughter of L. E. Creasy, he was educated at the Peterhouse Boys' School, an Anglican church boarding school in Zimbabwe, before attending Trinity College, Dublin, and Manchester University, where he received his MA degree. He is married and has three children and one step-daughter. At one time his wife was Helen Jay, one of the twin daughters of Labour Party politicians Peggy Jay and Douglas Jay.

== Career ==
Pennant-Rea joined the Bank of England in 1973 and remained until 1977, when he left to work for The Economist magazine. He was the magazine's editor from 1986 until 1993. Between 1993 and 1995, he again joined the Bank of England as Deputy Governor of the bank, under the governorship of Edward George; he resigned following reports of an extramarital affair with Mary Ellen Synon, whom he had met at Trinity College, Dublin.

In 1994 he became a member of the influential Washington-based financial advisory body, the Group of Thirty.

In 1995 he became a director of a Canadian mining company, Sherritt International. In March 1996, he was banned from the USA (along with his wife at the time and under-age children) because of Sherritt's commercial interests in Cuba, under the terms of the USA's Helms-Burton Act.

Pennant-Rea was chairman of The Stationery Office following its privatisation in 1996. He was a British American Tobacco director from 1998 to 2007. He was also Chairman of Henderson Group, and a non-executive director of several companies such as Go-Ahead Group, a transport company, First Quantum Minerals and Gold Fields, both mining companies.

In July 2009, Pennant-Rea was appointed non-executive chairman of The Economist Group, having served as a non-executive director since August 2006. In July 2018, after nine years, he was succeeded by Paul Deighton. He was chairman at Royal London, and Chairman of PGI , an agriculture company. He was a National Independent director of Times Newspapers. Since retiring from Royal London in 2019, Pennant-Rea has been an angel investor and board member of start-ups related to greenhouse gases reduction such as Cloud-Cycle .

In the non-profit sector, Pennant-Rea is a trustee of the Marjorie Deane Foundation. He was a trustee of Speakers Trust, the UK's leading public-speaking training charity and Chairman of the Shakespeare Schools Festival. Pennant-Rea has written several books about economics and a novel, Gold Foil.

Media offices
Preceded by Andrew Knight	Editor of The Economist; 1986–1993	Succeeded by Bill Emmott
