= Aoife Moore =

Northern Irish journalist

- Born: 1990 or 1991 (age 34–35); Derry, Northern Ireland
- Occupation: Political correspondent
- Employer: BBC
- Awards: Irish Journalist of the Year 2021

Aoife-Grace Moore is an Irish journalist. She is an editor at joe.ie, and formerly worked for the BBC as a political correspondent. She is from Derry, Northern Ireland and is based in the Republic of Ireland where she and Paul Hosford, broke the COVID-19 related story, known as "Golfgate" i.e., Oireachtas Golf Society political scandal and published in the Irish Examiner in 2020, which led to several high-profile resignations.

== Background ==
A Derry native, Moore is the niece of Bloody Sunday victim Patrick Doherty. She is a graduate of Glasgow Caledonian University.

== Career ==
Moore has worked for the BBC, Press Association, and the Irish Examiner. Since leaving the BBC, to work independently, she appeared on their 2 October 2025 edition of Question Time hosted in Belfast. The panel included Northern Ireland Secretary Hilary Benn MP.

While working for the Irish Examiner, Moore was the target of tweets as part of the Eoghan Harris Twitter scandal, and has been the subject of workplace sexual harassment. In 2025, she stated she was "the victim of online abuse on Tattle Life, with entirely untrue gossip spread about her personal and professional life."

She wrote a bestselling non-fiction book about Sinn Féin "'The Long Game: Inside Sinn Féin" for Sandycove publishing and Penguin in the United Kingdom. Upon its release in September 2023 it was described as "a compelling and revealing account of modern Sinn Féin, which sets out in considerable detail the inner workings of the party, its dynamics, and its power games" by The Irish Times. Furthermore, the English newspaper The Guardian described the book as both "fascinating" and "insightful" and named it book of the day on 15 September 2023.

The book also attracted controversy with several inaccuracies noted. Sinn Féin referred to her claims as "innacurate and offensive", while journalist and abuse victim Mairia Cahill claimed to have secured an apology and corrections from Moore's publisher (but not Moore herself) for several innacuracies, this claim has never been verified. The Irish Independent referred to the book as falling "bizarrely flat".

=== Golfgate ===
Una Mullally described Moore and Hosford's Golfgate coverage as the "scoop of the year", and they shared the NewsBrands Ireland "Journalist of the Year Award".

=== Fools for Love ===
In October 2023 Moore presented "Fools for Love?" on RTÉ One an acclaimed documentary which explored the dangers of online dating. The documentary found Moore interviewing various women and hearing about their experiences of looking for love on dating apps.

=== Mo Mowlam ===
In April 2023 Moore appeared on the Late Late Show and said she "would not rest" until British politician Mo Mowlam's contribution to the Good Friday Agreement was more widely acknowledged.
