= Irish Daily Mail =

Newspaper on the island of Ireland

- A front page from 2011 showing the updated masthead
- Type: Daily newspaper
- Format: Tabloid
- Owner: DMG Media
- Founded: February 2006
- Political alignment: Right-wing eurosceptic
- Circulation: 14,237

The Irish Daily Mail is a newspaper published on the island of Ireland by DMG Media (the parent company of the British Daily Mail). The paper launched in February 2006 with a launch strategy that included giving away free copies on the first day of circulation and low pricing subsequently. The 2009 price was one euro. The strategy aimed to attract readers away from the Irish Independent.

Associated Newspapers Ireland employs over 160 people in Ireland. Both the Irish Daily Mail and the Irish Mail on Sunday, along with their magazines, YOU and TV Week, are printed by Smurfit Kappa News Press in Kells and The Irish Times at Citywest, Dublin.

In July 2006 British media analyst Roy Greenslade explained falling sales of the Irish Daily Mail: whereas the British version of the Daily Mail acutely understands its readership, "None of that understanding of the culture, politics and genuine interests of the Irish people is evident in the pages of the Irish Daily Mail". By 2009 this policy had changed – the paper offered Irish-language wallcharts for schoolchildren, and most of its coverage was about Irish subjects, though it is frequently scathing about politicians.

Irish columnists are contributing to the paper, with Rónán Mullen's column, for example, in the Irish Daily Mail since May 2006. Mary Ellen Synon, a former Sunday Independent columnist who had controversial views on travellers, asylum seekers and the Paralympics is a regular contributor to the paper. Mark Dooley has also served as a columnist since 2006. His popular column "Moral Matters" appears on Wednesdays.

On 24 September 2006, Ireland on Sunday, which had been purchased by Associated Newspapers in 2001, was rebranded as the Irish Mail on Sunday, replacing the British edition of the Mail on Sunday in the Irish market.

In February 2007 Fine Gael leader Enda Kenny cited the Irish Daily Mail in the Dáil regarding a front page which depicted a CT scanner that lay idle in a laundry room.

In October 2012 an Irish Daily Mail team won an NNI journalism award honour in the category "Best Design & Presentation". The jury commented: "There was attitude, colour cohesion and brilliant headline writing throughout."

In March 2019 DMG Media Ireland – the group representing the Irish Daily Mail, the Irish Mail on Sunday, Extra.ie and Evoke.ie – proposed 35 redundancies, which would have brought staff numbers down to 121. In April 2019 compulsory redundancies were announced. 35 redundancies occurred by the end of April 2019.

In 2019, DMG Media Ireland acquired Rollercoaster, an Irish website targeted at parents.

== Circulation ==
Circulation of the Irish Daily Mail:

Year (period)	Average circulation per issue
2007 (July to December)	59,913
2009 (January to June)	52,144
2012 (January to June)	51,598
2014 (December)	43,850
2017 (July to December)	37,531
2018 (July to December)	30,424
2019 (January to June)	27,959
2019 (July to December)	26,271
2020 (January)	25,205
2023 (February)	17,646
2023 (May)	17,148
2023 (June)	16,737
2023 (November)	16,433
2025 (July)	14,237

== Controversies ==
The paper has faced criticism for attempting to transfer its traditional campaigns on topics such as the European Union and immigration and asylum from its domestic British market to Ireland. In Ireland, the EU and immigration were considered building blocks of Ireland's economic boom and as such did not raise the same reactions from readers as they do in Britain. It regularly covered the Lisbon Treaty debate, opposing acceptance of the treaty leading up to the referendum in June 2008.

In April 2009, it was pointed out by popular British science blog The Lay Scientist that while the Irish Daily Mail were campaigning for the reintroduction of the HPV vaccine in Ireland, the Daily Mail in London were printing stories attacking the vaccine. The contradiction was condemned by many, including comedy writer Graham Linehan.

On 1 February 2011 it was announced that the Sunday Tribune had gone into receivership, with fresh investment being sought by McStay Luby. The following day it was announced that there would be no further edition of the newspaper for four weeks. The last issue appeared on 30 January 2011. On 6 February 2011, the edition of the Irish Mail on Sunday had a cover similar in style to the Tribune The Irish Mail on Sunday was subsequently sued. The fake Mail on Sunday featured a "wraparound" cover with a heading saying "a special edition designed for readers of the Sunday Tribune". The National Consumer Agency confirmed it was considering prosecuting the Irish Mail on Sunday for a breach of the Consumer Protection Act and the secretary of the National Union of Journalists, described the move by the paper as "crass and cynical" He added: "This was a cynical marketing exercise and represents a new low in Irish journalism. There can be no justification for the decision to reproduce the Sunday Tribune masthead instead of the Sunday Mail 's own masthead". The following July, the Mail paid "a six figure sum" to settle a legal action brought by the receiver for "passing off".

In July 2011, the newspaper refused to pass on the government's VAT reduction to its readers. Taoiseach Enda Kenny said that businesses to which the new lower VAT rate applied would be "failing Ireland" if they did not pass on the reduction. Labour TD Aodhán Ó Ríordáin said: "I really think the Daily Mail's refusal to pass on the Government's VAT cut represents a real slap in the face to Irish consumers." It is estimated the Daily Mail will save approximately €750,000 as a result of this decision. The Phoenix Magazine noted however that the Irish Daily Mail "with a cover price of €1, the Mail is one of the cheapest daily newspapers in the country and is 85c cheaper than the Indo [Irish Independent]". It also commented that Ó Ríordáin's wife, Aine Kerr, was a former political correspondent with the Irish Independent, the paper's main rival who "was more than happy to print the story".

Days later a damning report from Britain's Information Commissioner found that the Irish Daily Mail was involved in the illegal trade of obtaining personal information on driving licences, criminal records, vehicle registration searches, reverse telephone traces and mobile-phone conversations.
