= Gene Kerrigan =

Irish journalist and novelist

Gene Kerrigan is an Irish journalist and novelist who grew up in Cabra in Dublin. His works include political commentary on Ireland since the 1970s in such publications as Magill magazine and the Sunday Independent newspaper. He has also written about Ireland for International Socialism magazine.

His book The Rage won the 2012 Gold Dagger for the best crime novel of the year. Marilyn Stasio, in a 2014 review of Dark Times in the City, comments that Kerrigan "writes with a grim elegance".

The ghettoes sink deeper into despair while southside gobshites chatter inanely about the Celtic Tiger. —Gene Kerrigan

Kerrigan retired from his role as a regular columnist with the Sunday Independent in November 2023.

== List of works ==
Non-Fiction

- Kerrigan, Gene (1984). Round Up the Usual Suspects: Nicky Kelly & the Cosgrave Coalition. Dublin: Magill Publications. ISBN 0-9507659-2-9. with Derek Dunne
- Kerrigan, Gene (1990). Nothing But the Truth. Dublin: Tomar Publishing. ISBN 1-871793-06-8.
- Kerrigan, Gene (1992). Goodbye to All That: A Souvenir of the Haughey Era. Dublin: Blackwater Press. ISBN 0-86121-374-2. with Derek Speirs
- Kerrigan, Gene (1993). Police Interrogation Endangers the Innocent, Chapter 1: The Anatomy of an Interrogation. Dublin: Irish Council for Civil Liberties. ISBN 0-9515425-2-4.
- Kerrigan, Gene (1995). Hard Cases: True Stories of Crime and Punishment. Virgin Books. ISBN 0-86369-890-5. and Gill & Macmillan ISBN 0-7171-3862-3
- Kerrigan, Gene (1998). Another Country: Growing Up in 50's Ireland. Dublin: Gill & Macmillan. ISBN 0-7171-2745-1.
- Kerrigan, Gene (1999). This Great Little Nation: The A-Z of Irish Scandals and Controversies. Dublin: Gill & Macmillan. ISBN 0-7171-2937-3. with Pat Brennan
- Kerrigan, Gene (2002). Never Make a Promise You Can't Break: How to Succeed in Irish Politics. Dublin: Gill & Macmillan. ISBN 0-7171-3459-8.
- Kerrigan, Gene (2012). The Big Lie - Who Profits From Ireland’s Austerity?. Doubleday Ireland. ISBN 1848271506.
- Kerrigan, Gene (2015). The Scrap. Transworld Ireland. ISBN 1781620350.

Fiction

- Kerrigan, Gene (2005). Little Criminals. Vintage. ISBN 0-09-948149-9., also Random House (ISBN 0-09-948895-7) and Europa (ISBN 1-933372-43-5)
- Kerrigan, Gene (2007). The Midnight Choir. Vintage. ISBN 0-09-948376-9., also Europa Editions (ISBN 1-933372-26-5)
- Kerrigan, Gene (2009). Dark Times in the City. Harvill Secker. ISBN 1-84655-255-9.
- Kerrigan, Gene (2011). The Rage. Harvill Secker. ISBN 1-84655-256-7.
