= Tattle Life =

Gossip website

- Website type: Gossip and discussion forum
- Available in: English
- Founded: 2017
- Creator: Sebastian Bond
- Website: tattle.life
- Current status: Online

Tattle Life is an online gossip and discussion forum focused primarily on social media influencers, reality television personalities, bloggers, and other public figures in the United Kingdom and Ireland. The website describes itself as providing “commentary and critiques of people with a significant following that choose to monetise their personal life as a business and release it into the public domain”.

Founded in 2017, the site hosts discussion threads about online personalities, influencer marketing, consumer complaints, and internet culture. As of 2025, the website reportedly received approximately 12 million visits annually.

== Content and reception ==
Tattle Life has attracted both support and criticism for its role in online commentary culture. Supporters of the site have argued that it provides a space for consumer discussion and accountability regarding influencers and online personalities who monetise their public image and businesses.

Critics have described the platform as facilitating bullying and online shaming of influencers. Discussions on the site have included commentary on influencers’ appearances, relationships, parenting, and business activities.

== Legal proceedings ==
In 2023, Northern Irish couple Donna and Neil Sands initiated legal proceedings against "persons unknown" operating Tattle Life, claiming libel, breach of privacy, and harassment. The case was conducted under reporting restrictions for two years, with the defendants' identity treated as unknown to the claimants.

The Sands hired private investigation firm Nardello & Co. to investigate the identity of Tattle Life's operator. According to later court findings, Nardello & Co. provided a report on 6 June 2023 identifying Sebastian Bond as the likely operator and including his personal email address and home address in Poole, Dorset.

Court documents released in May 2026 showed that Neil Sands received Sebastian Bond's personal email, IP address, home address, banking details from a confidential source who appears to have been working for Xenforo on 14 April 2023 who sent purchase orders. These personal details were forwarded by Neil Sands on 14 April 2023 to Nardello and Co with the message "We have an email and an IP address for tattle owners FYI.". The confidential source within Xenforo advised Neil Sands to continue with an application for a Norwich Pharmacal order. This application for an NPO was sworn on 20 June 2023 and Xenforo responded on 28 June 2023 with the same details that the confidential source had already sent on 14 April 2023.

On 23 June 2023, the Sands' legal team, led by barrister Peter Girvan, served a statement of claim against "person or persons unknown operating under the pseudonym Tattle Life". The claim was served via a Mimecast link sent to a defunct Hotmail address previously associated with Tattle Life.

In December 2023, Mr Justice McAlinden of the High Court of Northern Ireland issued a default judgment in the Sands' favour, awarding them £300,000 in damages (£150,000 each). The judge also imposed a worldwide freezing order on the defendants' assets.

== Setting aside of judgment (2026) ==
On 5 May 2026, Mr Justice Humphreys of the High Court of Northern Ireland set aside the December 2023 judgment. The judge ruled that the Sands and their legal representatives had failed to properly serve proceedings on Bond and had engaged in what he described as "repeated" and "egregious" breaches of their duty to make full and frank disclosure to the court over a two-year period.

According to the May 2026 judgment, despite receiving the Nardello & Co. report on 6 June 2023 – 17 days before their first court hearing - identifying Bond and providing his contact details, the Sands' legal team continued to tell the court at hearings in June, September, and December 2023 that investigations into the identity of the site's operator were "ongoing" and had not been "bottomed out".

Court documents showed the Mimecast link used to serve the claim was never accessed and expired on 28 July 2023. Bond stated he first became aware of the lawsuit from leaks on Reddit while it was under reporting restrictions.

In March 2026, Rory Lynch, head of reputation management at Gateley Legal and the Sands' lead solicitor, filed an affidavit apologising to the court, to Bond, and to the Sands' own KC, Gavin Millar. Lynch acknowledged that information identifying Bond "should have been disclosed to the Court" during the 2023 proceedings and that previous statements had been "incomplete". He stated this was "not deliberate" and "was not intended to withhold information from the court" for "tactical advantage".

In late June 2025, following the lifting of the RRO, Neil Sands reposted an Instagram story created by Donna Sands which was an “Ask me anything.” The question posed was “When did you uncover Sebastian’s identity?” to which the answer was given “@neilsands- worked it out years ago, before he deleted all these videos online.” An online video from “Nest and Glow”, a site associated with Sebastian Bond, was playing with the date “4 May 2023” superimposed on the screen.

Mr Justice Humphreys concluded that the court had been "misled" and described the failures as involving "serious and repeated" breaches of basic legal processes, with "very serious consequences" for Bond. The original judgment, damages award, and worldwide freezing order were set aside.

At the initial hearing in June 2023, Mr Justice Friedman had noted that many of the posts about the Sands on Tattle Life were "relatively mild" and consisted of "the sort of content that you see in magazines like Hello and OK!" which he considered "benign".

Following the May 2026 ruling, the Free Speech Union, which had supported Bond's legal challenge, described the case as raising "deeply troubling issues" about the use of litigation to suppress online speech, noting: "A wealthy couple were able to shut down unwanted speech about themselves by securing a court judgment without even the most basic legal process. Anyone who worries about the powerful or wealthy using high-powered lawyers to shut down free speech should be terrified by this case."
