= Lorella Zanardo =

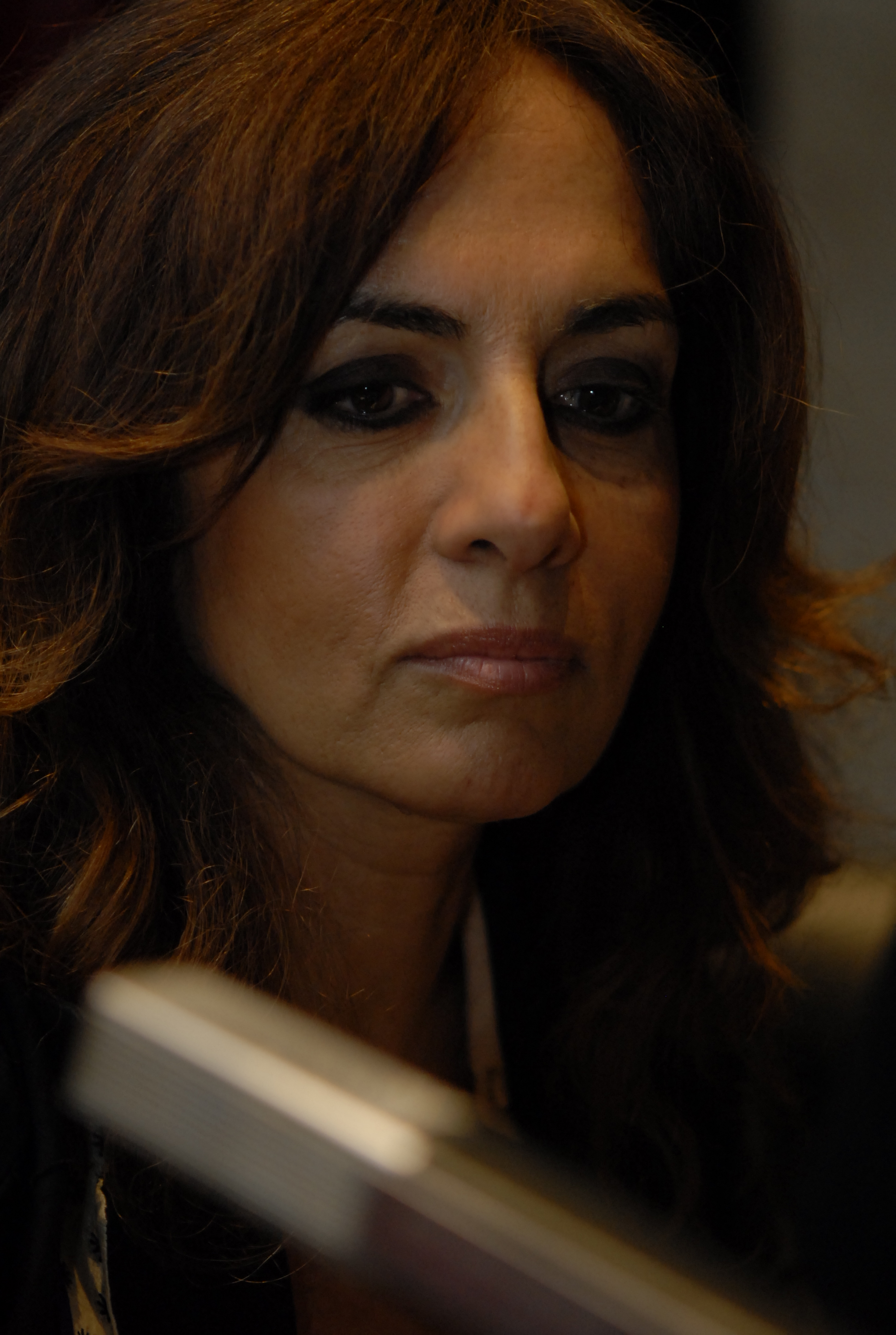
Zanardo in 2010

Lorella Zanardo is an Italian business consultant, film maker, author and women's rights activist. After a career working for Unilever and Arnoldo Mondadori Editore, she released the documentary Il corpo delle donne (The Body of Women) in 2009. She followed it with a book of the same name and another book entitled Senza chiedere il permesso: Come cambiamo la tv (e l'Italia) (Without asking permission: How we change television (and Italy)). Zanardo stood as a candidate for The Other Europe in the 2014 European Parliament election.

== Career ==
Lorella Zanardo worked for Unilever and Arnoldo Mondadori Editore, before becoming a financial consultant. After her career in business, Zanardo released the documentary Il corpo delle donne (The Body of Women) in 2009. The 23 minute long film examined how women were represented as sexualised objects on Italian television and caused an international debate, being translated into English, French, German, Greek, Spanish and Portuguese. The following year, she released a book with the same title (Il corpo delle donne) about the reception of the documentary and how to change the media. Over the next two years, she presented the course Nuovi occhi per i media (New eyes for the media) to high school students and wrote a book entitled Senza chiedere il permesso: Come cambiamo la tv (e l'Italia) (Without asking permission: How we change television (and Italy)).

In the 2014 European Parliament election, Zanardo stood as a candidate for The Other Europe, an Italian party which supported Alexis Tsipras.

== Personal life ==
Zanardo was born in Milan in 1957. She attended the Università Cattolica del Sacro Cuore and then Bocconi University. She is married with two children.

== Awards and recognition ==
The newspaper Corriere della Sera selected Zanardo as one of its women of the year in 2009 and two years later the International Alliance of Women voted her one of the top 100 women working for social justice worldwide. In 2013 she received the prize "Archivio Disarmo - Golden Doves for Peace" awarded by IRIAD.

== Selected publications ==
- Zanardo, Lorella (2010). Il corpo delle donne. Milan: Feltrinelli. ISBN 978-8807171864.
- Zanardo, Lorella (2012). Senza chiedere il permesso. Come cambiamo la Tv (e l'Italia). Milan: Feltrinelli. ISBN 978-8807172410.
