= Annalisa Piras =

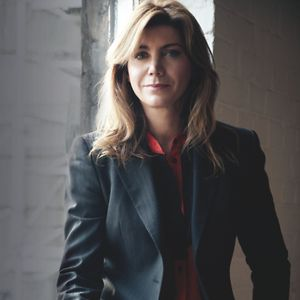
Annalisa Piras

Annalisa Piras is a London-based Italian-British prominent filmmaker, journalist, producer, writer and activist known for her innovative work that explores political and social issues, particularly within the context of the European Union. Overall, Annalisa Piras's body of work is distinguished by its particular focus on European political and social landscapes.

She directs The Wake Europe Project, an educational social enterprise she co-founded with Bill Emmott, former editor of The Economist. In 2019, they ran the first Wake Up Europe Impact Films Festival, the first ever transnational impact documentary festival entirely devoted to showcasing the best films produced worldwide to highlight the shared challenges our Western societies face, with a special focus on the meaning of a European civic conscience.

She is currently the director of Springshot Productions, an independent production company which specialises in hard-hitting, current affairs documentaries.

Documentary Filmmaking Filmography

== Girlfriend in a Coma ==
In 2012, Annalisa Piras produced, co-wrote and directed the first independent feature documentary on Italy as seen from abroad, Girlfriend in a Coma, working with Bill Emmott, former editor of The Economist, as co-author and narrator. The film was made by Springshot Productions.

The documentary is inspired by Emmott's book Good Italy, Bad Italy (Yale University Press), as well as by Piras's patriotic passion and insight about the country she left in the early 1990s. Inspired by the Divine Comedy, it features Benedict Cumberbatch as Dante Alighieri's voice, and British artist Phoebe Boswell's animations. It was broadcast on BBC Four, Sky Italia, and La7 TV channels early in 2013, and subsequently on other channels worldwide as well as in public screenings. https://uniondocs.org/event/2013-10-13-girlfriend-in-a-coma/ The “Girlfriend in a Coma” title is a citation of a British musical hit by The Smiths from their album Strangeways (1987). The film has been acclaimed as one of the sharpest analyses of contemporary Italy. Le Monde defined it as "a desperate love letter to Italy". The New York Times wrote: "combining wit and gravitas, 'Girlfriend in a Coma' deftly navigates Italy’s troubled waters, offering both a critique and a celebration of a nation in crisis." The Financial Times: "Annalisa Piras and Bill Emmott deliver a powerful indictment of Italy’s political and economic malaise, making 'Girlfriend in a Coma' a must-watch for anyone interested in the future of Italy." The Huffington Post emphasized the documentary’s emotional impact and its call to action for Italians and global audiences alike. They appreciated the film’s honest and unflinching portrayal of Italy’s condition: "Annalisa Piras’s 'Girlfriend in a Coma' is not just a film but a heartfelt plea for change, urging viewers to not only recognize but also rectify the failings of Italian society." Variety noted the film’s compelling narrative style and effective use of historical and contemporary footage. They acknowledged the documentary’s success in shedding light on complex issues in an accessible manner: "With its engaging storytelling and sharp analysis, 'Girlfriend in a Coma' is a wake-up call for Italy, urging viewers to confront and address the deep-seated issues plaguing the nation."

2015

"The Great European Disaster Movie”. BBC, Arte Tv, SVT, Springshot Productions. In 2014, Piras wrote, directed and produced with Bill Emmott the documentary “The Great European Disaster Movie” on the crisis of the European Union co-produced by Nick Fraser for the BBC Storyville strand, Claudia Bucher, for Arte TV, and Axel Arno for SVT, Swedish public TV.

"The Great European Disaster Movie" (2014) is one of Piras's most notable works that examines the challenges facing the European Union through a mix of drama and documentary footage. It is the first ever film on the EU crisis from an international point of view and predicted a number of events which happened years later. The film, shot in 2014, predicted Brexit, the hardening of the migrant crisis, populism, war in Ukraine, and the unravelling of the idealism behind the European integration project. Since then, it has become somehow a cult movie among audiences aware of the potential consequences of the slow disintegration of the collaboration spirit of the EU. It was produced by BBC and Arte among others.

“The Great European Disaster Movie” won the 2016 prestigious German CIVIS media prize in the information category. The film was selected among 930 applications from media programmes from all over Europe. The prize was bestowed by the German Federal President Joachim Gauck and the President of the European Parliament Martin Schulz at a star-studded event in the German Federal Foreign Office in Berlin in May 2016.

On May 19, 2016, in recognition of the educational and thought-provoking value of The Great European Disaster Movie, the president of the Chamber of Deputies of Italy, On. Laura Boldrini, invited Annalisa Piras and Bill Emmott to screen the film in the Italian Parliament in front of an audience of Rome's secondary school students. https://presidenteboldrini.camera.it/20?album=1667&raccolta=2077https://presidenteboldrini.camera.it/20?album=1667&raccolta=2077

On 14 September 2016 the director of the Galleria Civica d’Arte Moderna e Contemporanea and of Castello di Rivoli Carolyn Christov-Bakargiev, invited Annalisa Piras and Bill Emmott to screen and debate the film at Castello di Rivoli because she said " I watched the movie one year ago and I was very keen to invite the authors because The Great European disaster Movie is a work of Art which belongs to the history of Cinema". https://www.artribune.com/attualita/2016/09/gam-torino-film-brexit-annalisa-piras/

2017

“Europe At Sea” – 60’. Arte TV, SVT.Springshot Productions.

Piras'2016 film, "Europe at Sea", a feature-length documentary co-produced by Arte and SVT was nominated for the 2016 Prix Europa, the Oscar of European Documentaries. It was broadcast across the world in 2017. The film looks at Europe's role on the global stage in light of today's transnational security challenges and the shifting sands of geopolitics. It gained exclusive access for the first time to the work EU's top diplomat, the High Representative for Foreign and Security Policies Federica Mogherini.

2022

“The Euro Story” – 90 ‘.Arte TV.

First-ever documentary on the history of the Euro narrated by its founding fathers through an international perspective.

== Journalism and TV career ==
Piras began her journalism career in 1988 at La Repubblica, covering arts and local news in Rome for its city supplement, Trovaroma. From 1990 to 1992 she worked as a director and programmer (regista-programmista) at RAI Sat, the satellite channel of Italy’s public broadcaster, making programmes for European audiences. These included Comics, a 50-episode series on non-verbal comedy, which she compiled and edited from RAI’s television comedy archives, and Families, a six-part series telling the stories of six families who had recorded three generations of their lives on 16mm home movies. As EU senior editor, Piras was part of the initial team which launched Euronews, the pan-European multilingual news television channel, on 1 January 1993 in Lyon, France.

Piras was the London Correspondent for L'Espresso from 1997 to 2011 and for La7 TV for six years 2001-2008. From 2006 to 2007, Annalisa was the first Italian president of the London Foreign Press Association.

In 2008, Piras' BBC Radio 4 documentary The Italian Patient was shortlisted as the FPA Best Story of the Year by a UK-based foreign correspondent. Her TV documentary on the Hutton Enquiry, written and directed for La7 TV, was shortlisted for the same award in 2003.

Piras was a regular member of the BBC Dateline London panel. She also provided analysis on European and Italian Current Affairs for The Guardian.

As a political and social commentator, she frequently appeared on BBC News, Sky News, CNN, Al Jazeera and CNBC.

A central theme in much of Annalisa Piras’s work is European affairs. She frequently examines the political dynamics, cultural issues, and social challenges within Europe. Her work often advocates for a greater understanding of the European Union’s role and the importance of unity among European nations.

Piras's work is also characterized by its strong social and political commentary. She addresses pressing issues such as migration, economic disparity, the rise of populism, security and climate change. Her films often aim to provoke thought and discussion, encouraging viewers to engage with the complex realities of contemporary Europe.

Not For Profit - Educational Projects

In 2013, Piras and Bill Emmott founded the Wake Up Foundation, with the aim of raising public awareness about the current state and decline of Western Societies through film and storytelling. In 2013, they launched the campaign Wake Up Europe! to foster political debate and citizens' participation about the greatest challenges facing Europe. The Wake Up Europe Campaign has since been organising hundreds of documentary screenings and debates across the world, from the Italian Parliament, Montecitorio, to a small town hall in Denmark or prestigious universities such as Oxford or Cambridge; the campaign has since engaged thousands of citizens, fostering informed debates about the future of our European societies.

After the Covid 19 interruption, in the run-up to the 2024 European Parliament elections, Piras organised and moderated a new series of screenings and debates, now called The Wake Europe Project, in collaboration with the European Commission Representation in Rome, designed to inform and engage citizens on the EU’s Green Deal policies. Following the established format of the Wake Up Europe campaign, each event paired a high-quality documentary, Nicholas Brown’s Blue Carbon, with a discussion between experts and citizens. The events toured mostly coastal cities, including Genoa, Venice, Palermo, Cagliari, Livorno and Forlì, highlighting the potential of “blue carbon” ecosystems to store CO₂. Blue carbon is the carbon stored in marine and coastal ecosystems such as seagrass, salt marshes and mangroves. https://www.genovabluedistrict.com/7-giugno-wake-up-europe/

In 2025 Piras brought her Wake Europe Project campaign to the European University Institute in Florence. Working with the EUI’s School of Transnational Governance, she conceived and curated Visioni d’Europa, a series of six screenings at Palazzo Buontalenti, and co-moderated them with the School’s director, Fabrizio Tassinari. Each evening paired an acclaimed documentary, several of them Italian premieres, with a debate between leading experts and the citizens of Florence. The series drew some 900 people and, for the first time, opened Palazzo Buontalenti to the Florentine public. https://www.eui.eu/news-hub?id=visioni-deuropa-si-chiude-con-un-appello-rompere-il-soffitto-di-cristallo
