= Mary Ellen Synon =

Irish journalist

Mary Ellen Synon (born 1951) is an American-Irish journalist. She is a frequent contributor to Irish radio current affairs programmes. Through her career, she has been an outspoken critic of the European Union and an advocate of laissez-faire capitalism.

== Family background ==
Synon was born in Virginia. She is the daughter of John J. Synon, (d.1972) an American journalist who worked with Goodwin J. Knight and George Wallace. Synon met George Wallace as a young woman. Synon's paternal ancestors came from the area near Doneraile, County Cork.

== Education and career ==
After studying at Trinity College Dublin, she worked briefly for the Daily News in Durban, South Africa, and for publications in New York before joining the staff of The Daily Telegraph in London as a reporter. While she was at the Telegraph, she was a member of the Institute of Journalists, and served as a trade union official and negotiator. She was also awarded a Winston Churchill Travelling Fellowship which allowed her to be based in Paris for nine months to study the European Economic Community.

Synon worked at the London bureau of the American television current affairs programme, 60 Minutes, working first as a researcher and then as an associate producer for correspondent Morley Safer and producer John Tiffin. She worked on 60 Minutes programmes in various countries including Nigeria, South Africa, Swaziland, Ireland, France, Denmark, Germany and the UK. Synon subsequently worked as Dublin correspondent, then Europe correspondent, and finally British correspondent for The Economist. She has also been a columnist in Ireland for the Sunday Business Post, the Sunday Tribune, the Sunday Independent, and has contributed to The Irish Times, the Irish Independent and the Irish edition of the Sunday Times.

In 1995, Synon made headlines in the British and Irish press over her affair with Rupert Pennant-Rea, the deputy governor of the Bank of England. Pennant-Rea subsequently resigned. Synon spoke to the press when he ended the affair. According to the Sunday Tribune, she said: "Yes, I adored him. Yes, I was in love with him." She also told The Guardian: "I hate the bugger." She was nicknamed 'the Bonk of England' by tabloid newspapers after she disclosed that she and Pennant-Rea had had sex on the governor's dressing room floor at the Bank. The then governor Sir Eddie George allegedly had the carpet cut up.

== Views ==
Synon has repeatedly expressed opposition to any form of socialism in her articles and has referred to Marxism as "evil". Synon has described the socialist policies of Salvador Allende in Chile as a front for Soviet control of the country, saying that was "just what the evil Allende was up to in Chile". Synon also praised Augusto Pinochet for staging the coup that ousted Allende, saying "It was a noble coup, General". Synon has also stated there is no difference between Marxism and Fascism and cited George G. Watson's book, The Lost Literature of Socialism as an indicator of this thesis. She added, "There is no polarity between Nazis and Marxists. They are the same people."

Among other people she has criticised are the two female presidents of Ireland: "that other ambitious small-town lady lawyer", Mary Robinson, who worked for the "headquarters of moral corruption, the United Nations"; and the "arrogant Mrs McAleese".

Synon has expressed admiration for the American philosopher Ayn Rand.

In 2015, Synon gave a speech to the Bruges Group where she criticised David Cameron's policy on the European Union, arguing Cameron was not doing enough to take the UK out of the E.U. In an interview on the TV show Pat Kenny Tonight, Synon said she was pleased with the victory of Donald Trump in the 2016 US presidential election, adding that she was "beyond thrilled" that Trump became president.

== Controversies ==
=== Economist article on Ireland ===
In January 1988, Synon and Frances Cairncross wrote an article from the Economist that depicted Ireland as poverty-stricken and bureaucratic. The article angered both the Fianna Fáil government of the time and the Irish Department of Foreign Affairs, who believed the article, published in an influential magazine, "did serious damage to the image of Ireland overseas".

=== Comments on Susan O'Keefe ===
When Irish journalist Susan O'Keeffe was brought before the Beef Tribunal for refusing to name her sources, an article Synon wrote about O'Keeffe caused a public outcry: "Just before the appearance, Ms. Synon wrote in the Sunday Tribune that she would be happy to see Ms O'Keeffe in handcuffs, a remark Ms O'Keeffe's counsel complained about in court".

=== Travelling Community ===
In 1996, Synon wrote an article stating most rural crime in Ireland was caused by the travelling community and that traveller life was "a life worse than the life of beasts, for beasts at least, are guided by wholesome instinct". An unsuccessful attempt was made by a Travellers Rights Group to initiate a prosecution under the Incitement to Hatred Act.

=== Paralympics article ===
In 2000 Synon criticised the Paralympics in Sydney. In the article, she wrote: "It is time to suggest that these so-called Paralympics ... are – well, one hesitates to say 'grotesque'. One will only say 'perverse' ... Surely physical competition is about finding the best – the fastest, strongest, highest, all that. It is not about finding someone who can wobble his way around a track in a wheelchair, or who can swim from one end of a pool to the other by Braille." She advised the disabled and blind to "play to your competitive advantage" and added: "In other words, Stephen Hawking shows his wisdom by staying out of the three-legged race."

The article, which was criticised by the National Union of Journalists, was subsequently discussed in the Irish Senate where Maurice Hayes, a senator, director of Independent News & Media, which owns the Sunday Independent, and acquaintance of the controlling shareholder, said it was indefensible, indecent and hurtful: "It should not have been written and if written, it should not have been published. I know that my views are shared by my colleagues on the Independent board and in particular by the chairman." The chairman, Tony O'Reilly, and his son, Gavin O'Reilly were both attributed opinions in the matter. As a result of the controversy, Synon left the newspaper.
