= Anne Harris (journalist) =

Irish journalist

Anne Harris (born 25 August 1947) is the former editor of the Sunday Independent. Her daughter Constance Harris writes for the newspaper as a fashion writer. She is the former wife of Eoghan Harris who was an opinion columnist for the newspaper.

== Biography ==
Anne Harris was born 25 August 1947.

In 1972, Harris wrote a controversial article defending the 1972 Aldershot Bombing, an article she later expressed regret for. Harris also worked for the Irish Press, as well as the political magazine Hibernia and the fashion magazine Image. Harris was originally a socialist and a feminist. In the 1980s she abandoned socialism in favour of the free market, but remained a feminist. Harris also became known for her opposition to Irish nationalism and Irish republicanism, similar to her then-husband Eoghan Harris and Conor Cruise O'Brien; this position was reflected in the Sunday Independent's coverage of Northern Ireland. This caused some commentators to claim Harris was a "Southern Unionist".

Harris lived with Sunday Independent editor Aengus Fanning until his death in 2012.

On 5 February 2012, the Sunday Independent announced Anne Harris would succeed Fanning as the publication's editor. On the evening of Saturday 19 July 2014, group editor of INM Stephen Rae ordered the presses to be stopped to amend a column written by Sunday Independent editor Anne Harris which featured references to Denis O'Brien. Copies of the original article did however appear, allowing comparisons between the two. Harris originally wrote: "Denis O'Brien is the major shareholder in INM. In theory, with 29% of the shares, he does not control it. In practice, he does." Rae had the last sentence deleted. Harris also wrote: "The question is whether he understands newspapers. In order to confront the truths in our society, we must have a free press. With the restrictive charter for journalists proposed last year, and some garrotive (sic) new structures, Denis O'Brien does not make this easy." This was changed to: "The question is whether he understands newspapers. In order to confront the truths in our society, we must have a free press. If the restrictive charter for journalists proposed last year, along with some other structural changes, are anything to go by, it might be instructive for him to listen to journalists, troublesome and all as they are." Harris left the newspaper some months later, with The Irish Times noting her departing speech to staff as follows: "She is understood to have spoken only about journalists and journalism and not about newspapers and their owners, a subject matter she has previously addressed in several columns".
