= 2008 in Irish television =

The following is a list of events relating to television in Ireland from 2008.

== Events ==
=== January ===
- 5 January – American anime-inspired animated series Kappa Mikey debuts on TG4.

=== March ===
- 10 March – A blanket ban on filming in and around Stormont Castle is lifted when the restrictions on the presence of cameras in the building are lifted, thus allowing proceedings in the Northern Ireland Assembly to be televised.
- 17 March – Minister for Communications, Energy and Natural Resources Eamon Ryan announces the launch of RTÉ International under the new working title of Diaspora TV.

=== April ===
- 5 April – Sesame Tree Debutes on BBC Two Northern Ireland, it is shown on CBeebies in the UK in August

=== June ===
- 4 June – An article in The Irish Post suggests that Diaspora TV will keep the RTÉ International name. The channel may also be on air ahead of the scheduled launch date of 17 March 2009.
- 12 June – RTÉ News Now is launched as an online service. The channel began broadcasting as a free-to-air channel on 29 October 2010 on Saorview.

=== July ===
- 27 July – For the first time, the annual Reek Sunday Mass on the summit of Croagh Patrick is broadcast live worldwide by RTÉ. It is celebrated by Bishop Michael Neary, who speaks of consumer values that he feels are seducing society.

=== October ===
- 6 October – TG4 picks up US comedy drama Lipstick Jungle.
- 20 October – TV3 announces that it will axe the Friday broadcast of TV3 Nightly News, moving current affairs programme The Political Party to replace it. The Saturday and Sunday editions of TV3 News at 5:30 will also cut back, with TV3 News at 5:30 being axed from the weekend schedules to be replaced by five-minute news bulletins.
- October – RTÉ News Now wins the award for Business Services at the Inspired IT Awards in Dublin.

=== November ===
- 2 November – RTÉ postpones the planned launch of RTÉ Entertainment, citing financial circumstances. The broadcaster had written to Eamon Ryan during October claiming that it would be "unwise" for it to continue with the plan. RTÉ said it intended to honour the commitment in the 2007 Broadcasting Act and hoped to launch the station by the end of 2009. A spokeswoman for Eamon Ryan says the decision to postpone the launch of the channel is "a reflection of the financial realities in Ireland and worldwide". She adds that the minister is committed to the idea of RTÉ International and that it could be a "brilliant product" similar to BBC World News.
- 9 November – RTÉ One airs Gaybo Laughs Back in which veteran broadcaster Gay Byrne introduces some of the comedy highlights from his thirty-seven years at the helm of the long-running television series, The Late Late Show.
- 10 November – Launch of Channel South, a television channel operated by City Channel, transmitting 24-hour local programming to Cork, Limerick, and parts of Kerry, Waterford, Clare and South Tipperary.
- 21 November – An edition of The Late Late Show features a performance by the dance troupe The Satanic Sluts leading to a raft of complaints from RTÉ viewers in the following days. The same show ends with presenter Pat Kenny tearing up a pair of tickets for The Late Late Toy Show in frustration after a viewer who won them along with €10,000 in a phone-in competition said she wasn't "particularly interested" in attending.

=== December ===
- 8 December – Brenda Shanahan wins the first series of The Apprentice and a €100,000-a-year job with businessman Bill Cullen.
- December – RTÉ News moves out of its usual Studio Three in RTÉ Studios in Donnybrook, Dublin, and relocates to a temporary studio while work is carried out Studio Three for a relaunch. The new look is unveiled on the One O'Clock News programme on Monday 9 February 2009.

=== Unknown ===
- Undated – TG4 becomes a founding member of the World Indigenous Television Broadcasters Network (WITBN).
- Undated – Launch of Setanta Ireland, a subscription sports channel on Sky.

== Debuts ==
=== RTÉ ===
- 10 January – Operation Transformation on RTÉ One (2008–present)
- 6 February – Roary the Racing Car on RTÉ Two (2007–2009)
- 6 February – Horrid Henry on RTÉ Two (2006–2019)
- 10 March – Monday Night Soccer on RTÉ Two (2008–2013)
- 23 March – Celebrity Bainisteoir on RTÉ One (2008–2012)
- 14 April – Livin' with Lucy on RTÉ Two (2008–2010)
- 12 June – Sex & Sensibility on RTÉ One (2008)
- 13 June – Zoe Kezako on RTÉ Two (2006–2008)
- 14 June – The Big Money Game on RTÉ One (2008–2013)
- 2 August – Fáilte Towers on RTÉ One (2008)
- 31 August – Whistleblower on RTÉ One (2008)
- 4 September – At Your Service on RTÉ One (2008–present)
- 8 September – Raw on RTÉ Two (2008–2013)
- 14 September – Customs on RTÉ One (2008)
- 15 September – Who Do You Think You Are? on RTÉ One (2008–2009)
- 15 October – Rachel Allen: Bake! on RTÉ One (2008)
- 28 October – Monster Buster Club on RTÉ Two (2008–2009)
- 9 November – Gaybo Laughs Back on RTÉ One (2008)
- 14 December – The Spectacular Spider-Man on RTÉ Two (2008–2009)
- Undated – Big Cook, Little Cook on RTÉ Two (2004–2006)
- Undated – It's a Big Big World on RTÉ Two (2006–2010)
- Undated – Rupert Bear, Follow the Magic... on RTÉ Two (2006–2008)

=== TV3 ===
- 25 February – Dirty Money: The Story of the Criminal Assets Bureau (2008)
- 29 May – Championship Throw-In (2008–2010)
- 1 June – Championship Live (2008–present)
- 1 September – Midday (2008–2016)
- 22 September – The Apprentice (2008–2011)

=== TG4 ===
- 5 January – Kappa Mikey (2006–2008)
- 7 January – Seacht (2008–2011)
- 20 September – Bo on the Go! (2007–2011)
- 6 October – Lipstick Jungle (2008–2009)

=== BBC ===
- 5 April – Sesame Tree on BBC Two (2008–2013)

== Ongoing television programmes ==
=== 1960s ===
- RTÉ News: Nine O'Clock (1961–present)
- RTÉ News: Six One (1962–present)
- The Late Late Show (1962–present)

=== 1970s ===
- The Late Late Toy Show (1975–present)
- RTÉ News on Two (1978–2014)
- The Sunday Game (1979–present)

=== 1980s ===
- Dempsey's Den (1986–2010)
- Questions and Answers (1986–2009)
- Fair City (1989–present)
- RTÉ News: One O'Clock (1989–present)

=== 1990s ===
- Would You Believe (1990s–present)
- Winning Streak (1990–present)
- Prime Time (1992–present)
- Nuacht RTÉ (1995–present)
- Nuacht TG4 (1996–present)
- Ros na Rún (1996–present)
- Premier Soccer Saturday (1998–2013)
- Sports Tonight (1998–2009)
- TV3 News (1998–present)
- The View (1999–2011)
- Ireland AM (1999–present)
- Telly Bingo (1999–present)

=== 2000s ===
- Nationwide (2000–present)
- TV3 News at 5.30 (2001–present)
- The Clinic (2003–2009)
- The Panel (2003–2011)
- Against the Head (2003–present)
- news2day (2003–present)
- Other Voices (2003–present)
- Tubridy Tonight (2004–2009)
- The Afternoon Show (2004–2010)
- Ryan Confidential (2004–2010)
- Saturday Night with Miriam (2005–present)
- Seoige and O'Shea (2006–2009)
- The Podge and Rodge Show (2006–2010)
- Anonymous (2006–2011)
- One to One (2006–2013)
- The Week in Politics (2006–present)
- Tonight with Vincent Browne (2007–2017)
- Xposé (2007–2019)

== Ending this year ==
- 3 April – Dirty Money: The Story of the Criminal Assets Bureau (2008)
- 26 April – The Once a Week Show (2007–2008)
- 3 July – Sex & Sensibility (2008)
- 13 August – Fáilte Towers (2008)
- 19 October – Customs (2008)
- 26 December – Killinaskully (2003–2008)
- 31 December – Night Shift (2006–2008)
- Undated – Give My Head Peace (1998–2008)
- Undated – You're a Star (2002–2008)

== See also ==
- 2008 in Ireland
