= Television licensing in the Republic of Ireland =

Overview of the television licensing system of Ireland

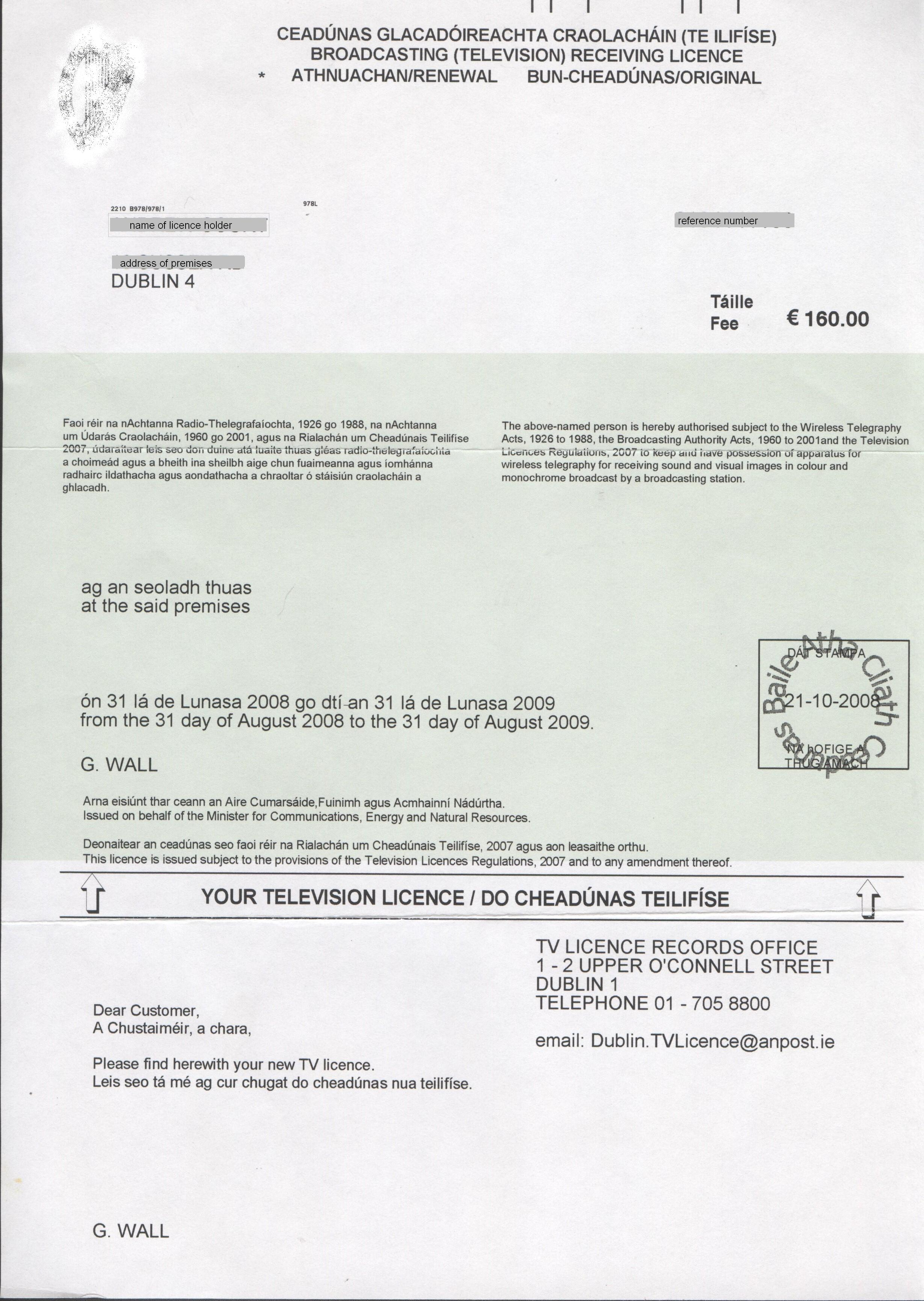
The physical licence is a document issued by An Post

In Ireland, a television licence is required for any address at which there is a television set. Since 2016, the annual licence fee is €160. Revenue is collected by An Post, the Irish postal service. The bulk of the fee is used to fund Raidió Teilifís Éireann (RTÉ), the state broadcaster. The licence must be paid for any premises that has any equipment that can potentially decode TV signals, even those that are not RTÉ's. The licence is free to anyone over the age of 70, some over 66, some Social Welfare recipients, and the blind. The fee for the licences of such beneficiaries is paid for by the state. The current governing legislation is the Broadcasting Act 2009, in particular Part 9 "Television Licence" and Chapter 5 "Allocation of Public Funding to RTÉ and TG4". Devices which stream television via internet do not need licences, nor do small portable devices such as mobile phones.

The FG-Labour coalition planned to replace the television licence with a Public Service Broadcasting Charge on all primary residences and certain businesses. A public consultation document on the plan was published in August 2013. Asked in December 2014 about the delay in switching from the licence to the new charge, Minister of State Joe McHugh said the government would "be taking more time to work out a very complex system". Implementation of the broadcasting charge was postponed in 2015 but returned to the political agenda in 2017. In August 2019, Richard Bruton, the Minister for Communications, announced that from 2024 the licence fee would be replaced by "a device independent broadcasting charge", with implementation and enforcement details to be worked out in the interim.

== Collection and evasion ==
An Post is responsible for collection of the licence fee and commencement of prosecution proceedings in cases of non-payment. Licences can be purchased and renewed at post offices (in person or by post), or by using a credit card or debit card via a call centre or via the internet. An Post receives commission to cover the cost of its collection service. In 2004, An Post had signalled its intention to withdraw from the business, but was still the agent in 2017. In 2012, 10.25% of licensees were paid by direct debit and 11.5% using savings stamps. The Broadcasting (Amendment) Bill 2017 proposes to allow public tender for additional collection agents, who would not have prosecution powers. A 2017 Oireachtas committee report recommends transferred responsibility for collection to the Revenue Commissioners. In 2019 minister Bruton announced a public tender for all licence-fee collection for the five years to 2024. Even if An Post loses the contract, it will still be possible to pay for television licences at post offices. Nevertheless, commentators have suggested the potential loss of income may compromise the commercial viability of rural post offices, which are seen as socially important in isolated communities.

An Post maintains a database of addresses and uses this to inspect suspected cases of non-payment. As of 2019 the database is 30 years old, does not contain Eircode data, and has no data mining capabilities. Television dealers are required to supply details of people buying or renting televisions; this is no longer enforced as details supplied were unreliable. There is no obligation on cable and satellite providers to supply details of subscribers; in November 2012, a bill to change this was introduced. Minister for Communications, Energy and Natural Resources Pat Rabbitte announced a planned government bill to the same effect in July 2014. In April 2015, the proposal was to allow An Post to access cable and satellite subscriber databases, in tandem with cost-cutting at RTÉ; in October 2015 it was reported that the plan had been shelved.

More than 90 An Post employees work in licence collection, including the inspectors, who visit the premises to verify if TV receiving equipment is present. If speedy payment of the licence is not made following an inspection, court proceedings are commenced by An Post. In 2002, the rate of licence-fee evasion was estimated at 12%. In the Dublin region in that year, approximately 21% of detected evaders were summonsed for prosecution (6,000 cases); approximately one third of these cases resulted in fines, averaging €174. Only 4% of fined evaders followed up three months later had purchased a licence. In 2012, there were 11,500 prosecutions, up 10% over 2011. Of those convicted, 242 were sent to jail, most for a few hours, six overnight. This compared with 49 jailed in 2008. The Irish Times reported in 2019 that the burden of proof for conviction was high, since proof of occupancy is needed before issue of a summons, which must then be personally served.

In 2010, the Secretary General of the Department of Communications, Energy and Natural Resources told the Oireachtas Public Accounts Committee that the evasion rate was estimated at 12%, and the renewed contract with An Post would include provision for a 1 percentage point annual decrease in this. In September 2016 the evasion rate was estimated at 13.75%, representing approximately €40m annual lost revenue. The estimated evasion rate was 14.1% in 2017 and 12.83% in 2018.

== Disbursement ==
TV licence fees make up 50% of the income of RTÉ. The bulk of the rest comes from RTÉ broadcasting commercials on its radio and TV stations. RTÉ also sells programming to other broadcasting. Some RTÉ services, such as RTÉ 2fm, RTÉ Aertel, RTÉ.ie, and the transmission network operate on an entirely commercial basis.

The licence fee does not entirely go to RTÉ. Expenses first deducted include the cost of collection (paid to An Post).

7% of the balance is used for Coimisiún na Meán's "Sound and Vision Scheme", which provides a fund for programme production and restoration of archive material which is open to applications from any quarter. TG4 does not obtain licence fee revenue directly, but does so indirectly as RTÉ is required to provide it with one hour's programming per day, as well as other technical support. RTÉ's accounts express the cost of this as a percentage of its licence fee income, amounting to 5.3% in 2006. The remainder of TG4's funding is direct state grants and commercial income. The 2009 McCarthy Report, commissioned in response to a growing economic crisis, recommended that €10m of TG4's funding should in future come from licence fee revenue; without increasing the fee, this would entail a matching reduction in RTÉ's funding. This reduction is included in the government budget introduced in December 2010. A 2017 Oireachtas committee report recommended that any increase in revenue from reduction in fee evasion should be allocated to TG4 and independent broadcasters providing public-service programming.

The RTÉ Authority was replaced by the Broadcasting Authority of Ireland which regulates both private and public broadcasters. It is not directly funded from the licence fee; RTÉ, however, in common with other broadcasters, pays a levy to the Authority for its services. The Broadcasting (Amendment) Bill 2019 would allow up to 50% of the BAI's funding to come directly from the television licence.

== Criticism ==
The licence has been criticised both in principle and as regards its implementation.

It is opposed for being outdated in a world with an increasing variety of TV channels and audio-visual technologies. Commercial television companies have alleged that RTÉ unfairly uses licence fee to outbid them for broadcast rights to foreign films, TV series, and sports events. RTÉ denies this. European Community competition law prevents state funding of commercial activity, and RTÉ's accounts charge for non-"public service" programming out of its commercial income rather than its licence fee subsidy.

The licence is condemned as a regressive tax, where the majority of prosecutions are of people on low incomes.

The high cost of collection is presented as inefficient. Licence inspectors' calling to people's doors is seen as intrusive. The low rate of prosecution of non-payers is seen as allowing evaders a "free ride". The lack of an exemption (as exists in the UK) for those who can prove they don't use their equipment to receive RTÉ (or any TV) is regarded as unfair. Alternative funding methods suggested include direct funding from general exchequer revenues, or a levy on electricity bills on the model of Cyprus.

A licence is required per address, rather than per person or per set. It has been considered unfair that the same licence fee applies to a single private dwelling as to a large commercial address, such as a hotel or a privately owned business park. In 2003, there was negative comment after a crackdown on unlicensed television sets at holiday homes, and proposals for a reduced-rate licence for seldom-occupied premises.

RTÉ journalists largely support the existence of the licence, and lobby for greater increases in the fee, as being a revenue stream independent of the government and thus guaranteeing freedom from political influence and associated editorial bias. The opposite claim has also been made: that an annual review of the licence fee by the Government leaves RTÉ liable to political pressure.

A survey of public attitudes to public-sector broadcasting was carried out by the Economic and Social Research Institute in 2004. The authors noted that "public discontent at the level and inherently regressive nature of the ad rem licence fee is noticeable by its absence, particularly in contrast to the difficulties associated with the introduction of some ad rem service charges, e.g. bin and water charges." The associated opinion poll recorded agree:disagree percentages of 54:29 for the statement "Public Broadcasting should be financed by the licence fee." Respondents were asked what level of monthly fee they would be prepared to pay to receive RTÉ if subscription access were hypothetically to replace the licence fee: the annualised mean and median household figures were €180 and €252.60, compared to the then licence fee of €150, with those who frequently watched RTÉ programs most willing to pay.

== History ==
Television licences were introduced for the establishment of Telefís Éireann (now RTÉ) in 1962. Radio licences, abolished in 1972, had been introduced by the Parliament of the United Kingdom in 1904 prior to the creation of the Irish Free State in 1922. Non-compliance was widespread until the Wireless Telegraphy Act 1926 when the Minister for Posts and Telegraphs was empowered to prosecute those with no licence.

Although before 1962 there was no television licence as such, a television set fell under the definition of "wireless receiver"; thus someone possessing a television but no radio would have needed a wireless licence at the same fee as someone with a radio. Conversely between 1962 and 1972, the possessor of a television licence did not need an additional radio licence.

In 1975, members of Conradh na Gaeilge, an Irish language activist group, began campaigning for an Irish-language television station. They adopted tactics learnt from Welsh language activists of Cymdeithas yr Iaith Gymraeg, including non-payment of the television licence, and non-payment of fines imposed for not having a licence. Between 1973-1993, a total of 15 people were imprisoned for terms of between 2 and 14 days for non-payment of the licence fee and associated fine. Among them were Alan Heusaff, Brian Ó Baoill, and Seán Mac Stíofáin. This campaign of civil disobedience ended in 1996 with the establishment of Telefís na Gaeilge (now TG4).

Century Radio, Ireland's first licensed national solely private-sector broadcaster, began broadcasting in 1990. Minister Ray Burke proposed allocating 25% of the television licence revenues to private-sector broadcasters. The government rejected this, but agreed instead to cap RTÉ's advertising income. A tribunal of enquiry later established that Oliver Barry, an investor in Century Radio, had given Burke a political donation of £30,000. The advertising cap was lifted in 1993.

In the mid-1990s, proposals were floated to distribute funding (licence fee income or otherwise) among broadcasters based on content production, on the model of New Zealand. RTÉ successfully persuaded Minister Michael D. Higgins against such a change; although the Sound & Vision scheme now operated effectively provides this, at a low level. RTÉ provide 7% (increased from 5% in 2009) of the licence fee to the Sound and Vision fund which is managed by the Broadcasting Authority of Ireland (BAI). RTÉ are required by law to commission independent productions with at least 20% of their total licence and 365 hours of programming a year to TG4.

=== Media convergence ===
The definition of television in the original licensing legislation presumed a wireless radio broadcast receiver, and it was unclear whether it extended to computers, Internet devices, 3G mobile phones, or other newer technologies. In April 2007, then Minister for Communications, Energy and Natural Resources Noel Dempsey proposed modernising the definition to include newer technologies The Oireachtas Joint Committee on Communications, Marine and Natural Resources cautioned against too broad a definition:

The Joint Committee notes that the proposed changes to the definition and interpretation as to what constitutes a television set could have adverse effects on the perception of Ireland as a global leader in technological developments. The Joint Committee accepts that the introduction of additional forms of licence fee collection, in that regard, could negatively impact on the business sector.

In 2009, a ministerial order under the 2009 Act explicitly exempted two classes of device from the requirement to have a licence; namely, portable devices with small screens such as 3G phones or PDAs, and devices accessing streaming video services via the internet. However, computers with TV tuner cards are not exempt.

The 2009 Act also provides for on-the-spot fines and civil suits to be used against those not having a television licence, in response to negative views of the previous use of criminal proceedings, including imprisonment.

The programme agreed by the Fine Gael–Labour coalition government formed after the 2011 general election states:

We will examine the role, and collection of, the TV license [sic] fee in light of existing and projected convergence of broadcasting technologies, transform the TV licence into a household-based Public Broadcasting Charge applied to all households and applicable businesses, regardless of the device they use to access content and review new ways of TV licence collection, including the possibility of paying in instalments through another utility bill (electricity or telecom), collection by local authorities, Revenue or new contract with An Post.

In January 2012, minister Pat Rabbitte told the Dáil the existing licence model was inadequate both because it failed to take account of new media and because the evasion rate was 15%. He said his department was studying funding methods of several foreign countries, and was considering using the database being established for the household charge to collect the broadcasting charge. The department commissioned a value-for-money report, completed in April 2013, which found that evasion of the licence fee was increasing and that "the most serious threat to the future effectiveness of the current system is likely to arise from the capacity and convergence of new technology". Based on the report, the department drafted a consultation document on a proposed new "Public Service Broadcasting Charge" which was published on 27 August 2013. In April 2015, Rabbitte's successor as minister, Alex White, said "we cannot replace the TV licence fee with a public service broadcasting charge until we have built public understanding and support for such a move". A September 2015 report by Kevin Rafter for the Independent Broadcasters of Ireland concluded that "Changing viewing habits will continue to undermine the licence fee model."

In November 2017, an Oireachtas committee report recommended a "non-device dependent public service broadcasting charge" per household, to fund "authoritative, impartial, indigenous, trusted and reputable public service media in Ireland". A 2018 review by Crowe Horwath for the BAI, of funding for public service broadcasters, noted that moving to such a charge would raise "at least two fundamental questions": who should pay how much (individuals, households, commercial properties, hotels) and who should be eligible for funding (over-the-air broadcasters only, or cable/internet content providers as well). In July 2018 the government set up a cross-departmental Working Group on the Future Funding of Public Service Broadcasting to consider the 2017 Oireachtas committee report. It reported in April 2019 to Richard Bruton, the Minister for Communications, Climate Action and Environment, and in August 2019 Bruton announced that from 2024 the licence fee would be replaced by "a device independent broadcasting charge", with implementation and enforcement details to be worked out in the interim. The media noted that the 2024 date would be after the 2024 general election, and that, depending on the collection method chosen, the charge might be "unworkable without opt-in compliance from the public".

=== Licence fee ===
Increases in the licence fee have been irregular. Only one happened between 1986 and 2001. Later increases were essentially index-linked, with none since the Irish financial crisis which began in 2008. Section 124 of the 2009 Act enshrines index-linking in law, although only as a recommendation. RTÉ in 2017 suggested an immediate increase to €175 to backdate annual increases forgone since 2009. A 2017 Oireachtas committee recommended a review every two years based on a pure CPI formula. The annual fee is set by a statutory instrument (SI) which remains in force until superseded by a later SI. Relevant fees and SIs are as follows:

year	date	television		radio	statute
year	date	colour	monochrome	radio	statute
2008	1 January	€160			S. I. No. 851/2007
2006	1 October	€158			S.I. No. 404/2006
2005	1 April	€155			S.I. No. 165/2005
2004	1 January	€152			S.I. No. 720/2003
2003	1 January	€150 (Note: Price for "Television Licence": monochrome/colour distinction abolished)			S.I. No. 608/2002
2002 (Note: Prices rounded down upon the changeover to Euro currency)	1 January	€107.00	€84.00		S.I. No. 396/2001
2001	1 September	£84.50 (€107.29)	£66.50 (€84.44)		S.I. No. 396/2001
1996	1 September	£70	£52		S.I. No. 249/1996
1986	1 March	£62	£44		S.I. No. 37/1986
1984	1 November	£57	£39		S.I. No. 248/1984
1983	1 April	£52	£34		S.I. No. 83/1983
1980	1 December	£45	£27		S.I. No. 359/1980
1978	1 December	£38	£23		S.I. No. 319/1978
1977	1 April	£31	£18.50		S.I. No. 76/1977
1974	1 October	£20	£12		S.I. No. 270/1974
1973	1 October	£15 (Note: "Broadcasting (Television) Receiving Licence (Colour and Monochrome)")	£9 (Note: "Broadcasting (Television) Receiving Licence (Monochrome Only)")		S.I. No. 274/1973
1972	1 September	£7.50 (Note: "Broadcasting (Television) Receiving License [sic]")		abolished	S.I. No. 210/1972
1971	1 September	£7·50 (Note: "Broadcasting (Television) Receiving Licence (including Sound Radio Broadcasts)")		£1.50 (Note: Fee was unchanged from 1970 but currency had been decimalised)	S.I. No. 241/1971
1970	1 July	£6		£1 10s	S.I. No. 141/1970
1963	1 November	£5		£1 5s	S.I. No. 199/1963
1962	1 January	£4 (Note: "Broadcasting Receiving Licence (including Television)")		£1 (Note: "Broadcasting Receiving Licence (excluding Television)")	S.I. No. 279/1961
1961	1 September			£1	S.I. No. 174/1961
1953	1 April			17s 6d	S.I. No. 55/1953
1940	1 June			12s 6d	S.I. No. 117/1940
1934	1 October			10s (Note: i.e. the higher-priced categories of 1927 were abolished; the blind exemption remained.)	S.I. No. 249/1934
1927	1 July			free (blind)	S.I. No. 54/1927
1927	3 January			10s (ordinary); £1 (institutions (Note: S.I. No. 1/1927 §1(b): "Schools and Institutions, as, for example, Colleges, Convents, Hospitals, Convalescent Homes, Boarding Houses, etc.")); £5 (hostels (Note: S.I. No. 1/1927 §1(c): "Hotels, Restaurants, Cafés, Clubs, Public Houses, etc.")); £1/week (entertainments (Note: S.I. No. 1/1927 §1(d): "Public Entertainments, e.g., Public Halls, Cinemas, Bazaars, etc., open to the public on payment of a charge")); £5 (public advertisement (Note: S.I. No. 1/1927 §1(e): "Loud Speaker Station for outside free public reception of broadcast matter as an advertisement or demonstration"))	S.I. No. 1/1927
1926	Some time between 5 May and 6 July			£1 (valve set) 10s (crystal set)	
1924	Some time between 8 May and 19 November			£1	
1922	July			All licences withdrawn owing to Irish Civil War	
Until July 1922				10s	

=== Licences issued ===
Year	Total licences	Sold licences	Welfare licences	Receipts €m (Note: Receipts prior to 2001 are gross and converted from Irish pounds to euros. Later receipts are net of collection cost.)	Ref
2014				213.2	
2013				216.4	
2012	1,411,787	1,003,860	407,927	215.0	
2011	1,425,258	1,021,443	403,815	217.8	
2010	1,431,716	1,038,665	393,051	222.4	
2009				226.2	
1988				62.3	
1987				58.4	
1986				53.8	
1985	755,095			48.5	
1984	720,934			43.4 (39.2 net)	
1970	429,719				
1964	231,845				

== See also ==
- Television in the Republic of Ireland
