= RTÉ Three =

- Country: Ireland

Ownership
- Owner: Raidió Teilifís Éireann

History
- Launched: Cancelled

RTÉ Three was a proposed channel by RTÉ Television.

It was the working title of a proposed general entertainment channel. It was initially proposed that the channel would air a variety of programming not then being shown on RTÉ One and RTÉ Two as well as having access to the RTÉ archives. The announcement of the channel in May 2008 was timed to coincide with the launch of the Broadcasting Bill 2008, which provided for the switching off of Ireland's analogue signal and the launch of two new government backed stations: the Houses of the Oireachtas Channel and the Irish Film Channel.

According to RTÉ CEL's and UPC Ireland's application for the 3 commercial DTT multiplexes, RTÉ Three would broadcast during weekdays, timesharing with RTÉ Sport which would air at weekends. Given that a children's channel was mooted, it was likely that RTÉ Two would be reconfigured along the lines of RTÉ Three plans with RTÉ Two possibly renamed RTÉ Two-Ten.
