= Broadcasting (Amendment) Act 2007 =

The Broadcasting (Amendment) Act 2007 is an Act of the Oireachtas (Irish parliament) which was enacted in April 2007. It deals with Irish Analogue broadcasting systems and the amendment of legislation on Digital Terrestrial Television dating back to 2001. This act amends previous acts in particular the Broadcasting Act 2001.

== Summary of the Act ==
The main purposes of the Act are:

- To give Irish national public service broadcasters (Radio Telefís Éireann [RTÉ] and TG4) obligations relating to digital terrestrial television.
- To mandate the licensing of multiplexes for carriage on the RTÉ multiplex of Irish free-to-air channels (first one, later two multiplexes) to the RTÉ Authority.
- To mandate the Broadcasting Commission of Ireland to license other interested broadcasters using free-to-air and pay-tier multiplexes (three, later four).
- To mandate ComReg with regulation of non-big screen TV type services such as Mobile TV.

As compensation for analogue television switch-off, it obliges RTÉ to create a digital television channel available on various platforms, such as terrestrial, satellite, cable and IPTV, providing home-created television programmes to Irish citizens abroad. As of 2008, the channel's working title was RTÉ International.

== Background ==
DTT was due to be operational in 2002. With the collapse of ITV Digital, IT's TV was unable to get funding to cover its fees and rollout the network as planned. RTÉ, holding a minority stake in the transmission network of IT's TV, carried out DTTV tests and a Digital Audio Broadcasting pilot between 1998 and 2001 using the Three Rock transmitter on channel 26. One applicant was announced by the Office of the Director of Telecommunications Regulation, now the Commission for Communications Regulation (ComReg). RTÉ currently broadcasts RTÉ, Network 2 (now renamed RTÉ 2), TV3, and TG4, plus two other surplus channels, although Tara TV was carried by RTÉ on one of these channels.

No EPG information was involved but a wireless return path (DVB-TRC) was tested. This meant a telephone line would not be needed for the digibox for subscription services. Although now regarded as an unnecessary expense, TG4 has expressed an interest in its incorporation into rollout.

RTÉ also ran a transmitter on Band 3 at Three Rock on Channel D for VHF tests. It was intended to have a 2 way channel to allow the viewer's home aerial to send a signal back to the DTTV transmitter, rather than via a telephone line. [ICDG, 2007]

Thirteen transmitters account for 92% network coverage. These are Kippure, Mount Leinster, Mullaghanish, Spur Hill, Maghera, Woodcock Hill, Truskmmore, Hollywell Hill, Moville, Cairn Hill, Three Rock, Clermont Carn, and Kilduff. Other in-fill transmitters are used to cover remoter areas. [RTÉNL, 2007]

The Department of Communications, Energy and Natural Resources Test ran between August 2006 and August 2008. The pilot was open to 1,000 users chosen by a research company, 500 from around the Three Rock Transmitter in Dublin, and 500 from the Clermont Carn upgraded transmitter in County Louth. The broadcast contract is with BT Ireland, NEC UK supply the transmission equipment.

Four multiplexes are being tested for use. One is for O2 Ireland and 3 Ireland called the DVB Multiplex. This uses Channel 26 to provide scrambled or encrypted channels only available to the DVB-Handheld enabled phone users.

On 15 June 2007, Eamon Ryan TD, Communications Minister, were given an Introductory Brief on the Irish DTT. Under a DTT paragraph on page 4, the pilot was described as underway. It suggested that continued progress was required on developmental and formal arrangements, to ensure the analogue system would be replaced nationwide under what is termed "analogue switchoff".

The Introductory Brief (page 7) also outlined changes to divisions within the Department of Communications, Energy & Natural Resources. It proposed the Broadcasting, Telecommunications and Postal Sectors to be renamed and subdivided into Broadcasting Policy, Communications (Business and Technology), Communications (Regulatory and Postal) and Communications (Development) Divisions.

Broadcasting Expenditure for the period (page 8) is €259.537 million with €0.705 for programme administration. Broadcasting Policy is responsible for the legislative and regulatory framework for broadcasting in Ireland. It has corporate governance responsibility for RTÉ Group, TG4, the Broadcasting Commission of Ireland, and the Broadcasting Complaints Commission. ComReg falls under the Communications (Regulatory and Postal) division of the department. The agencies of those above are set out in page 21. In particular, ComReg has a remit that covers TV services and mobile phone networks.

The above document is available to view under Freedom of Information legislation.

== Future broadcasting acts regarding a regulator of content for RTÉ and commercial TV companies in Ireland ==
A broadcasting bill went into eConsultation and was concluded on 18 April 2007. It foresaw the establishment of a Broadcasting Authority of Ireland and would amend RTÉ Authority provisions. The bill was expected to be enacted during 2008 and is part of the priority legislative Programme: 2007-2008 Proposals and will involve a new content regulator taking on the Broadcasting Commission of Ireland (BCI) and RTÉ Authority role.

The Broadcasting Bill 2006 will cover the dissolution of the RTÉ Authority, BCI, BCC and allow for transition arrangements, exemption from stamp duty, funding of the BAI by broadcasters, and the rules governing state support to RTÉ and TG4 under EC Directive 97/36/EC on state aid following government consultation with the Commission and EU Parliament. (Official Journal of EU. No. L. 202/60 of 30 July 1997).

The Act will also deal with TV license definitions and enforcements, codes and contract awards. It primarily will deal with State Aid concerns following on from the TV3 complaint to the Commission regarding public broadcaster license fee usage rules.

With regard to Digital Terrestrial Television and analogue switch-off, the Department of Communications has identified that Irish DTT is the only system that can provide "better quality, new services, and more channel... that can be regulated under Irish Law." Large scale public awareness is identified by the department. It outlined that in 1999, Ireland decided its approach to introducing DTT with the Broadcasting Act 2001 being enacted. The model adopted elsewhere was attempted but after a public tender competition the award to run the licenses failed in 2003.

The next move happened in 2005 when the Department of Communications decided on a DTT pilot programme to start roll-out of the service in Ireland and to help develop momentum regarding DTT in the consumer and private sector. Government approved and the trial is now up and running in Dublin and Louth using a three-year budget of €10 million, broadcasting on four multiplexes from Three Rock and Clermont Carn mountains. Twelve TV channels and also radio channels are provided and higher definition TV was trialled in July 2007 of the All-Ireland Hurling Final.

A Pilot Stakeholders Group exists to inform those involved in it and the department regarding issues that could be similar in a national roll-out. Under the Broadcasting (Amendment) Act 2007, RTÉ has a duty to roll out a DTT multiplex nationally carrying RTÉ 1, RTÉ 2, TV3, TG4 and possibly Channel 6. The BCI can allocate three other multiplexes which it is expected to put out to license by January 2008. Within the next year and a half, 20 to 30 channels are expected on Irish DTT.

In its Digital Switchover Plan, the Broadcasting Section of the Department of Communications identified the benefits that Irish citizens can benefit with increased entertainment offerings, additional sources of information and new forms of interaction and a potential means of government and public sector information. Thus digital television could be a driver of business and economic development across many sectors in the view of the Department of Communications (page 3 Intentions with Regard to the Introduction of Digital Television in Ireland). It identifies the Irish Government's role in point 16, but that Ireland is unusual due to its separate geography from mainland Europe and the issues of spectrum usage and satellite transmission. Political, economic and geographical links with Northern Ireland affect broadcasting policies and UK TV is popular in Ireland as a result, split between cable, satellite and analogue signal overspill. Ireland has he second highest penetration of satellite in Europe but Sky its main operator is unregulated in Ireland.

The Department of Communication also identified that broadband and digital TV contains synergies with data and telephony services. To that end, the department is involved in a National Broadband Scheme to cover the telecoms infrastructure upgrade costs for the remaining 10% of Ireland who for demographic and commercial telecom investment reasons would otherwise not get broadband. The department has not proposed an analogue switchover date as yet, though the Broadcasting (Amendment) Act gives the responsibility for the BCI foreseeably (BAI) to report when digital multiplex coverage for the RTÉ multiplex and other multiplexes are near universally covered and when analogue switchover can then be recommended and a date decided upon. In the next section the legislation underpinning Irish digital

== Subsequent legislation ==
The Broadcasting (Amendment) Act 2007 makes provision in relation to broadcasting. It deals with the supply and transmission of programme material and other data by digital means. It also deals with a combination of such programme material in relation to the broadcasting of certain services to Irish communities outside the Island of Ireland. It deals with the discontinuance of certain broadcasting services by analogue means and confers additional functions on RTÉ, the Broadcasting Commission of Ireland (BCI) and Teilífis na Gaeilge (TG4) to confer power subject to license on Telífis na Gaeilge and amends the Broadcasting Authority Acts 1960 to 2001 and certain other enactments and related matters.

Some definitions are used in the Act such as multiplex, programme material, sound broadcasting multiplex, television multiplex and television programme service contract. These warrant further explanation, as terms frequently referred to hereafter.

A multiplex is an electronic system which combines programme material and related and other data in a digital form and the transmission of that material and data by means of wireless telegraphy, either directly or indirectly for reception by the general public.

Channels and associated channel data such as interactive services related to that channel in effect can be broadcast on a transmission network multiplex subject to Broadcasting Commission of Ireland license.

Sound broadcasting multiplex means a multiplex in which programme material is mostly sound orientated and television broadcasting multiplex is likewise mainly television broadcasting.

The Broadcasting (Amendment) Act 2007 repeals Section 24 of the Broadcasting Act 1990, Section 4 of the Broadcasting Act 2001, Section 10 of the Broadcasting Authority Act 1960, and of the Broadcasting Acts 1960 to 2001. Section 20 of the Communications Regulation Act 2001 is also repealed as is Section 20 of the Radio and Television Act 1998 and Section 45 of the Wireless Telegraphy Act 1926 to 1988.

The preamble of the Act makes provision for broadcasting matters, for the supply of programme material, transmission of that material and of other data by digital means and in relation to broadcasting certain services to Irish communities outside the Island of Ireland. It also makes provision for the discontinuance of certain broadcasting services transmitted by analogue means, and confers additional functions on the Commission for Communications Regulation, Radio Telífís Éireann, Telifís na Gaeilge (still TG4's legal name) and confers powers subject to license on Teilifís na Gaeilge and amend the Broadcasting Authority Acts 1960 to 2001 and certain other enactments on 10 April 2007.

== Sections of the Broadcasting (Amendment) Act 2007 ==
Sections of the Broadcasting (Amendment) Act 2007 are arranged as follows:

- 1 – Title, overview, matters dealt with, and when the Act commences.
- 2 – Terms used, briefly explained in the previous section (interpretation).
- 3 – The RTÉ Authority functions.
- 4 – The Broadcasting Commission of Ireland's (BCI) new functions.
- 5 – The Commission for Communications Regulation's (ComReg) new duties, in relation to digital terrestrial television multiplexes.
- 6 – ComReg's new duties in relation to digital terrestrial sound broadcasting.
- 7 – Regulations relating to fees by applications and procedures.
- 8 – Applications for multiplex contracts.
- 9 – Review of applications for awarding multiplex contracts
- 10 – Terms and conditions of multiplex contracts.
- 11 – Analogue switch-off.
- 12 to 16 – Repeals of Sections of the Broadcasting Act 2001 primarily in 12 of Section 12, in 13, Section 16, Section 28 of 14, Section 32 of 15, in Section 45 of 16.
- 17 – Considers repeals.
- 18 – States expenses regarding administration of this Broadcasting (Amendment) Act 2007.

(End of page 1 of the Act)
