= RTÉ Commercial Enterprises =

Arm of Ireland's public service broadcaster

Raidió Teilifís Éireann Commercial Enterprises (RTÉ CEL)
- Type: Commercial subsidiary to RTÉ
- Industry: Broadcasting, publishing, advertising
- Headquarters: Montrose, Donnybrook, Dublin & Fr. Mathew Street, Cork, Ireland
- Area served: Ireland and Northern Ireland; Rest of the world (via internet, satellite, digital and analogue services) and Worldwide
- Products: Television and radio

Raidió Teilifís Éireann Commercial Enterprises (RTÉ CEL) is the commercial arm of Ireland's public service broadcaster RTÉ or Raidió Teilifís Éireann. RTÉ CEL is run independently from RTÉ, as a wholly owned subsidiary of the company, in similar way to BBC Studios, owned by RTÉ's British counterpart BBC. In 1999 it divested RTÉ of its 40% share of Cablelink. During the 1990s it had great success with Riverdance. It owns and publishes The RTÉ Guide, www.rte.ie and numerous spin off publications from RTÉ shows. It had an interest in Tara TV.

RTÉ CEL was part of the Easy TV (DTT) consortium that bid for one of the three Commercial DTT licences offered by the BAI in 2008. RTÉ confirmed on 14 May 2010 Easy TV was "declining their offer to pursue negotiations" on the DTT contract which ended the application process.
