= RTÉ Ireland =

Proposed Irish international television channel

- Country: Ireland
- Broadcast area: United Kingdom, Worldwide (proposed)
- Headquarters: Dublin

Programming
- Language(s): English; Irish

Ownership
- Owner: Raidió Teilifís Éireann
- Sister channels: RTÉ One; RTÉ Two; RTÉ News Now; RTÉjr; TRTÉ

RTÉ Ireland was a proposed international television channel, intended to be broadcast outside Ireland, by Ireland's public service broadcaster Raidió Teilifís Éireann (RTÉ). The channel was proposed to be broadcast online at RTÉ.ie, IPTV and on satellite in the United Kingdom. As of 2008, the proposed launch of the channel had been "shelved".

The channel was expected to offer programmes from RTÉ One and RTÉ Two. In 2007, the Oireachtas (parliament) passed legislation requiring that RTÉ supply international service to suit the needs of Irish citizens living abroad, along with other new digital RTÉ channels.

== History ==
The channel was initially to launch in Spring 2009, branded as "RTÉ International". It was proposed that the channel would launch in the United Kingdom in March 2009. (RTÉ's domestic channels are already available on Freeview, Sky and Virgin Media in Northern Ireland, but not to Great Britain, owing to rights restrictions.)

A similar service aired from 1996 until 2002, operated by a since-defunct cable and satellite channel, Tara Television. This channel was carried on Sky in the United Kingdom and on a small number of cable television services. Tara was shut down in 2002, leaving Irish viewers in Britain without access to Irish television. While Setanta Sports Media reportedly considered creating a replacement channel in 2004, this did not materialise.

In 2007, a Liberal Democrat councillor, of Irish extraction, Martin Curry, reportedly sought to have RTÉ International carried on the digital terrestrial television service, Freeview, if Sky removed its channels from Freeview, rather than allowing Sky to use the bandwidth for subscription television.

On 17 March 2008, Eamon Ryan the Minister for Communications, Energy and Natural Resources announced the launch of "RTÉ International" under the new working title of "Diaspora TV". On 4 June 2008, The Irish Post reported that the channel would not in fact be named Diaspora TV and would keep the RTÉ International name. They also suggested that the channel might be operational ahead of the previously scheduled launch date of 17 March 2009. On 2 November 2008, RTÉ postponed the planned launch, citing strained financial circumstances. The broadcaster wrote to Eamon Ryan during October 2008 claiming that it would be "unwise" for it to continue with the plan. RTÉ said it intended to honour the commitment in the 2007 Broadcasting Act and hoped to launch the station by the end of 2009. A spokeswoman for Eamon Ryan said the decision to postpone the launch of the channel was "a reflection of the financial realities in Ireland and worldwide". She said the minister was committed to the idea of RTÉ International and that it could be a "brilliant product" similar to BBC World News.

In September 2013, RTÉ announced new plans to launch the channel in the United Kingdom under the working title of "RTÉ Ireland", as part of their five-year (2012-2017) strategic plan.
