= RTÉ Guide =

Irish television and radio listings magazine

- Cover of 7–13 December 2024 issue
- Categories: TV and radio listings magazine
- Frequency: Weekly
- First issue: 1 December 1961
- Company: RTÉ Commercial Enterprises Ltd
- Country: Ireland
- Language: English; Irish
- Website: http://www.rte.ie/rteguide/

The RTÉ Guide is a television and radio listings magazine in Ireland published by RTÉ Commercial Enterprises Ltd, a subsidiary of Raidió Teilifís Éireann (RTÉ).

The magazine offers detailed programme listings for RTÉ channels, as well as Virgin Media One, TG4, Virgin Media Two, BBC One, BBC Two, UTV, and Channel 4, as well as less detailed listings for variations of BBC Wales, ITV Wales, S4C and a number of satellite and cable channels. RTÉ Radio programme listings are also published. Lifestyle and celebrity articles are also included in the magazine.

== History and profile ==
The RTÉ Guide began publication on 1 December 1961 as the RTV Guide and changed its name to the current name on 8 July 1966. Initially, listings were carried for Radio Luxembourg, AFN and BBC Northern Ireland but these were later dropped after a few years and only RTÉ programme listings were carried.

From 8 January 1977, the RTÉ Guide switched from tabloid format to a compact magazine size and also changed from monochrome into colour. After United Kingdom listings magazines such as Radio Times and TV Times were deregulated from 1 March 1991, the magazine began carrying BBC, UTV/HTV Wales and Channel 4/S4C listings from 13 April of that year, as well as three more services include Teilifís na Gaeilge (31 October 1996), Channel 5 (30 March 1997) and TV3 (20 September 1998) were also added.

A special Christmas double issue of RTÉ Guide is published every year to cover the Christmas and New Year period since 1970.

In April 2018, the design of the RTÉ Guide was changed for the first time in a number of years.

On 19 May 2019, it was reported that RTÉ was considering selling the RTÉ Guide. On 16 June 2019, it was reported that the Sunday Business Post owner, Enda O’Coineen, might acquire the RTÉ Guide. However by 5 December 2019, RTÉ had abandoned the proposed sale.

Selected articles and photos used in the magazine went online in 2025 via RTÉ Libraries and Archives.

== Circulation ==
The Audit Bureau of Circulations circulation figures for the RTÉ Guide were:

- 130,327 for July 2002 to December 2002
- 118,263 for July 2003 to December 2003
- 102,795 for the first six months in 2006
- 61,881 for 2012
- 53,695 in 2014
- 51,413 for 2015
- 48,089 for 2016
- 45,861 for 2017
- 43,195 for 2018

Figures subsequent to 2018 are not available because the RTÉ Guide is no longer registered with the Audit Bureau of Circulations.

== See also ==
- Television in the Republic of Ireland
- Radio in the Republic of Ireland
