= Sex & Sensibility =

- Created by: Midas Productions
- Country of origin: Ireland
- No. of episodes: 4

Production
- Running time: 30 minutes

Original release
- Network: RTÉ One
- Release: 12 June – 3 July 2008

Sex & Sensibility is an RTÉ television series focusing on changing attitudes to sex in Ireland. The four-part series was presented by Simon Delaney. Directed by Imogen Murphy, it was filmed on location in Dublin in April and May 2008 and aired in June and July of that year.

== Synopsis ==
The series reflected on the changes that had taken place in Ireland since the 1960s, an era when the sexual revolution had not yet reached the shores of the island. It claimed that television had been responsible for "loosening everyone up" and altering the country "from a gloomy 'Irish Taliban'-style theocracy to the nation of fun-loving sex maniacs we are today".

Terry Prone demonstrated her view that soaps, rather than "dusty old current affairs programmes", had been central to social change. The Riordans caused scandal when one of the characters, named Maggie, went on the pill. The series also featured the "contraceptive train" to Belfast, evoking memories of an era when the devices were illegal in the south of the country, prompting people to travel to Northern Ireland to stock up on their contraceptive needs.

Also featured was The Late Late Show and the uproar it caused when it gave airtime to a group of lesbian nuns, Bill Hughes, who spoke about the underground gay scene in Ireland, Senator David Norris having his sexuality called into question when he was asked if he was "sick" by a TV presenter, the Leeson Street clubbing scene in its early years and Toni the Exotic Dancer, a housewife from Tallaght, Dublin who flashed her ample bosom for the crowds who thronged the urban pubs after mass. Video of protesters with portable Virgin Mary statues at work outside the RTÉ studios were also shown.

Other features included some commentary from Bill O'Herlihy, Mary O'Rourke, Michael McNiff, Claire Tully, John Kelleher and night club owners Valeria Roe and Maurice Boland.

== Critical response ==
The Irish Independent described the series as "sniggering nonsense about Irish attitudes to sexuality over the past few decades" or "reeling in the leers (a pun on RTÉ's more successful series Reeling in the Years) with presenter Simon Delaney doing the leering". It was named by the newspaper as one of its six worst television programmes of 2008.
