= Gaybo Laughs Back =

- Gaybo laughing back
- Genre: Comedy
- Narrated by: Gay Byrne
- Country of origin: Ireland
- Original language: English
- No. of episodes: 1

Production
- Running time: 60 minutes

Original release
- Network: RTÉ One
- Release: 9 November 2008

Related
- The Late Late Show, Gaybo's Grumpy Men

Gaybo Laughs Back is an hour-long Irish television special and DVD released in November 2008. It was broadcast on RTÉ One on 9 November 2008 at 18:30, whilst the DVD was released on 15 November 2008, with over forty minutes of bonus material. It features RTÉ personality Gay Byrne, who introduces some of the comedy highlights from his thirty-seven years at the helm of the long-running television series, The Late Late Show.

The special features international comedians such as Spike Milligan, John Cleese, Peter Cook and Billy Connolly, who all regularly visited The Late Late Show, and Irish comedians such as Tommy Tiernan, Patrick Kielty, Dermot Morgan, Brendan O'Carroll, D'Unbelievables, Dylan Moran and Kevin McAleer, who all appeared on the show early in their careers. Unplanned sequences are also reflected upon, such as Lenny Henry's fall from his chair and Byrne being attacked by Emu.
