= Broadcasting Act 2009 =

Act of the Oireachtas

The Broadcasting Act 2009 (Number 18 of 2009) is an Act of the Oireachtas of Ireland. It was signed into law on 12 July 2009, although the provisions relating to the establishment of the new Broadcasting Authority of Ireland did not come into force until a Statutory Instrument was made giving them effect on 30 September 2009.

The Act covers mainly regulation and broadcasting and digital switchover in Ireland.

== Proposals ==
The Act provides for the establishment of a single content regulator, the Broadcasting Authority of Ireland (BAI), which took over the roles formerly held by the Broadcasting Commission of Ireland (BCI) and the Broadcasting Complaints Commission (BCC) in as well as a range of new functions and was constituted on 1 October 2009, with the former bodies wound up on the same date. There continues to be an element of separation, with a Contract Awards Committee and Compliance Committee remaining as committees of the BAI's main board.

The BAI has power to award programme contracts (as the Commission for Communications Regulation continues to issue the broadcasting licences proper) in the independent sector and ensures that all broadcasters, public and private, comply with contract conditions and standard. It regulates enforcement of sound broadcasting conditions and public service broadcasters as well as commercial broadcasters, with RTÉ and TG4 having become semi state companies and took on a greater role in terrestrial television regulation as new Irish channels emerged on the new, more spectrum capacity extensive DTT platform.

Television and radio stations face fines of up to €250,000 if they infringe codes of conduct or licence requirements under the Act's stricter enforcement mechanism. These financial penalties replaced the former limited redress available to the BCI of revoking licences for infringement of licences or codes.

Modernisation of sound broadcasting contracts including the availability of 'fast-tracked' applications, licence enforcement, legal definitions regarding TV licence and contract awards are other features of this Act.

Changes to the public service broadcasters and the allocation of public funding also took place with the new Act following on from discussion with the European Commission. It updated and revised the legislation relating to RTÉ and TG4 and established the framework for two public service broadcasters, an Irish Film Channel and an Oireachtas channel.

It reconstituted the RTÉ and TG4 Boards (the former losing the "RTÉ Authority" name, becoming the "RTÉ Board") and renamed RTÉ from Radio Telefís Éireann to Raidió Teilifís Éireann, in order to reflect the proper Irish language spelling of the name.

== Community Radio ==
The Act provides for a legal definition of Community Radio for the first time. Groups whose members are representative of, and accountable to their community, and who seek to provide a social benefit through the supply of programming to that community on a not-for-profit basis may enter into a Community Sound Broadcasting Contract.

The Act also extends the length of a temporary licence to 100 days within a 12-month period. The 100-day licence is only available to Community Sound broadcasters. The previous 30-day licence provision remains in place for other types of radio broadcasters.

There is also a new definition of Media literacy in the Act which includes the processes by which individuals and communities can create and publish audio or audio-visual material by means of broadcast and related electronic media.

The Act also charges the Broadcasting Authority with considering the needs of Community Broadcasters with regard to digital broadcasting.

== Public interest proposals ==
The Act introduced several proposals to protect the interests of viewers and listeners including a "right to reply" procedure where individuals whose reputation has been damaged may have this corrected in a further broadcast within 15 days. This is very similar to remedies available relating to the print-media sector although there the procedures under the Broadcasting Act differ as there is no ombudsman and the complaint is dealt with the Compliance Committee of the BAI.

Provision was also made for the establishment by RTÉ and TG4 of audience councils to represent the views of listeners and viewers. This means that they are more akin to commercially driven boards of semi-state companies.

A ban on advertising for junk food during children television viewing periods was also added when the Act was enacted in an effort to reduce the problems of obesity in Irish society that junk food adverts may encourage. Television licence fee evaders currently face significantly heavier fines but still get a last chance to avoid a court appearance.

In its current form, it removed the former ban on advertising directed towards religious ends, replacing it with a ban on advertising that refers to the benefits or otherwise of belonging to or believing in a particular religion.

== Digital television ==
A date of between September 2012 and December 2012 for the switch-off of analogue transmission and the nationwide rollout of the digital terrestrial television platform was established, with an ASO date being set, by a further statutory instrument, as 24 October 2012. 31 December 2011 was the DTT full coverage date determined by the Minister where coverage would reach 90% of the population equivalent to analogue terrestrial (aerial) coverage under Statutory Instrument 85 of 2010, the RTÉ (National Television Multiplex) Order 2010, signed in February 2012. However coverage requirements are likely to be exceeded providing universal 100% coverage using a variety of DTT and DST from June end 2011.

The Act consolidates almost 50 years of legislation relating to Irish broadcasting according to the Department of Communications.

It deals with Irish Analogue broadcasting systems and the amendment of legislation on Digital Terrestrial Television dating back to 2001. This Act amends previous acts such as the Radio and Television Act 1988, the Broadcasting Act 2001 and the recent Broadcasting (Amendment) Act 2007. The Broadcasting Authority Acts 1960-2001 was also repealed and the Broadcasting Authority of Ireland came into existence on 30 September 2009.

== Additional sources ==
- LK Shields Solicitors outline the key aspects of the Bill before the Oireachtas
- The Irish Government Department of Communications, Energy & Natural Resources website, section on broadcasting acts in Ireland
- Oireachtas, 2007 The Houses of the Oireachtas, "Broadcasting (Amendment) Act 2007 No.15 of 2007, Published: 18 April 2007, retrieved 25 October 2007
- BCI evolutation into BAI planned for 2008
- RTE.ie/business "Bill sets up new broadcasting watchdog" Retrieved 14 May 2008.
- Oireachtas, 2008 The Houses of the Oireachtas Broadcasting Bill 2008 to establish the BAI to take over BAI, RTÉ Authority, Broadcasting Commission of Ireland and Broadcasting Complaints Commission duties, and establish RTÉ and TG4 (previously Téilifis na Gaeilge) as corporate semi states and establish Houses of the Oireachtas Commission (Oireachtas TV) and Irish Film Channel (Irish Film Board/Board Scannan na hEireann).
- Consultation on DTT Multiplexes, Commission for Communications Regulation (radiowave spectrum regulator).
- Commission for Communications Regulation, "Response to Licensing Digital Terrestrial Television", Document 07/90
- Commission for Communications Regulation, " License for Digital Terrestrial Television", Document 07/90a.
- Commission for Communications Regulation, "Technical Conditions for Digital Terrestrial Television", Document 07/90b.
- Commission for Communications Regulation, "ComReg published License framework for Digital Terrestrial Television", Document: PR09 1107.
- Silicon Republic.com "DTT licences will cost operators €114k", by John Kennedy
- Department of Communications commencement order of the Act 15 by the previous Minister for Communications, Ireland in April 2007
- Information on ComReg's role in Irish broadcasting spectrum regulation
- Broadcasting Commission of Ireland DTT license applicants proposals
