= Tara Television =

Irish cable and satellite channel

Screenshot of Tara TV from 31 January 2000, including the station's logo; when not broadcasting, the station would show its listings on loop.

Tara Television (or Tara TV, or just Tara by continuity announcers) was an Irish cable and satellite channel that broadcast from 1997 to 2002, aimed at the Irish community living in Britain. Despite its initial promise, the channel faced financial difficulties and was officially closed down in 2002 following a decision by the Irish High Court.

It featured a mix of RTÉ programming and original content, and was 80% owned by United Pan-Europe Communications (UPC) (now Liberty Global) and 20% owned by RTÉ Commercial Enterprises (RTÉ CEL) during its closure.

Riordan Communications, an Irish-based telecommunications company, was initially involved in the establishment of Tara TV. However, by the time of the channel's closure in 2002, the ownership was solely divided between UPC and RTÉ CEL

== History ==
Before Tara TV, when BBC Select was in the planning stages, there were talks of a service provided by RTÉ for the niche subscription service, providing programmes for the Irish diaspora in the United Kingdom. The plan was later shelved due to several factors that delayed the launch of the BBC's niche service.

The station was launched by a consortium that included Ireland's state broadcaster, RTÉ, and aired a compilation of shows that had previously been aired by RTÉ in Ireland. It was initially carried by a number of cable providers, before being added to Sky Digital on 1 October 1998. The channel's original owners were RTÉ, United Pan-Europe Communications (owned by at the time by Dutch company United International Holdings, now part of Liberty Global) and Riordan Communications (involved in telecommunications companies active in rural Ireland).

Tara Television had an exclusive option to purchase the majority of RTÉ's programming, and this accounted for about 80% of the total programmes broadcast by the station, with the remainder being filled by programmes purchased from other networks. It mainly broadcast news bulletins and current affairs programming, as well as extensive coverage of Irish sport, in particular, GAA. RTÉ made sure that from 16 July 2001, Tara Television was blocked to Irish Sky subscribers as they feared loss of advertising revenue.

It was anticipated that Tara would pay royalties to RTÉ to air these programmes, and it was also envisaged that this could eventually be extended to the United States, Canada and Australia. However, Tara was wound up in March 2002 in proceedings brought about by RTÉ, who claimed non-payment of royalty fees from Tara. Tara was placed into examinership following the proceedings. An examiner, Ray Jackson of KPMG, was appointed and set out trying to place Tara back on a sound financial footing. Setanta Sports offered to take a majority shareholding in Tara and the restructured Tara offered to pay RTÉ all the outstanding money owed. In his report, Jackson stated that RTÉ were not prepared to consider this offer and were pushing for the total liquidation of Tara and therefore the station was taken off the air, three weeks before a deal between RTÉ and BSkyB for transmission of the RTÉ TV channels on Sky Digital to Irish subscribers.

At the time Tara was taken off the air, RTÉ's stake stood at 20% and 80% was owned by UPC, but Tara had acquired debts exceeding its assets by €22.8m (including loans of €18m from United Pan-Europe (UPC) and €2.7m from RTÉ). At the time of its closure it employed twenty people at its offices in Derry and London.

In later years, RTÉ approached the issue of overseas broadcasting through the use of its website to stream current affairs and news programmes. This included RTÉ's online TV catchup service, the RTÉ Player, which enables international viewers to watch a limited number of programmes broadcast in Ireland.

== See also ==
- Media of the Republic of Ireland
- Television in Ireland
- List of defunct Irish television channels
- List of defunct British television channels
