= RTÉ =

Irish public service broadcaster

Coordinates: 53.315926°N 6.225837°W

Raidió Teilifís Éireann
- RTÉ logo used since 2014 (with low green)
- Formerly: 2RN (1926–1933); Radio Athlone (1933–1938); Radio Éireann (1938–1966); Telefís Éireann (1961–1966); Radio Telefís Éireann (1966–2009); Raidió Teilifís Éireann (2009–present)
- Type: Statutory corporation
- Industry: Broadcasting
- Founded: 1 January 1926; 100 years ago (as 2RN); 1 June 1960; 66 years ago (as Radio Éireann Authority)
- Founder: Government of Ireland
- Headquarters: RTÉ Campus, Dublin, Ireland
- Area served: Worldwide
- Key people: Kevin Bakhurst (Director General); Terence O'Rourke (Chair of Board)
- Services: Television, radio, publishing, e-publishing, commercial telecoms, orchestras, and performing arts
- Revenue: ▲€380.4 million (2024)
- Owner: Government of Ireland
- Number of employees: 1,853 (as of 2024)
- Divisions: Commercial; Audience, Channels and Marketing; Content; RTÉ News and Current Affairs; Network; Operations & Production Services; Corporate HQ
- Subsidiaries: RTÉ Commercial Enterprises DAC; RTÉ Music DAC; RTÉ Transmission Network DAC (2rn)
- Website: Official website

Raidió Teilifís Éireann (pronounced [ˈɾˠadʲiːoː ˈtʲɛlʲəfʲiːʃ ˈeːɾʲən̪ˠ]; Irish for 'Radio [and] Television of Ireland'; RTÉ (Note: The É in RTÉ is pronounced as an English E (/iː/) and not an Irish É (Irish pronunciation: [eː]))) is an Irish public service broadcaster and news website. It produces and broadcasts programmes on television, radio and online. The radio service began on 1 January 1926, and regular television broadcasts began on 31 December 1961, making RTÉ one of the oldest continuously operating public service broadcasters in the world. It is headquartered in the Donnybrook district of Dublin, with additional news offices and studios across Ireland.

RTÉ is a statutory body, overseen by a board appointed by the Irish government, with general management in the hands of a committee of senior managers – currently an interim leadership team – headed by the director general. RTÉ is regulated by Coimisiún na Meán (lit. 'Media Commission'). It is financed by the television licence fee and through advertising, with some of its services funded solely by advertising, while others are funded solely by the licence fee.

The current network consists of four main television channels (RTÉ One, RTÉ2, RTÉ KIDSjr and RTÉ News) and four FM radio stations (RTÉ Radio 1, RTÉ 2fm, RTÉ Lyric FM and RTÉ Raidió na Gaeltachta). RTÉ also has a number of digital radio services; RTÉ Gold is its only online station with a full schedule. The broadcaster operates a number of online services, including a news website and an app, as well as the streaming service RTÉ Player. RTÉ previously owned 50% of the sports broadcaster GAAGO, which in turn operated LOI TV.

Radio Éireann, RTÉ's predecessor and at the time a section of the Department of Posts and Telegraphs, was one of 23 founding organisations of the European Broadcasting Union in 1950. RTÉ also publishes weekly listings and a lifestyle magazine, the RTÉ Guide.

== History ==
=== Establishment and name ===
Broadcasting in Ireland began in 1926 with the radio station 2RN in Dublin. From that date until June 1960, this broadcasting service (later Radio Éireann) operated as a section of the Department of Posts and Telegraphs. Those working for the service were directly employed by the Irish government and regarded as civil servants.

RTÉ was established on 1 June 1960 (as the Radio Éireann Authority) under the Broadcasting Authority Act 1960, the principal legislation under which it still operates. The existing Radio Éireann service was transferred to the new Authority, which was also made responsible for the new television service (Telefís Éireann). The television service started broadcasting on 31 December 1961, from the Kippure transmitter site near Dublin. Eamonn Andrews was the first chairman of Radio Éireann; the first director general was Edward Roth. At the suggestion of Áine Ní Cheanainn, the Broadcasting Authority (Amendment) Act 1966 changed the name of the Authority to Radio Telefís Éireann; both the radio and television services became known as RTÉ that year.

Section 113 of the Broadcasting Act 2009 changed the name of the organisation from "Radio Telefís Éireann" to "Raidió Teilifís Éireann", to reflect the current standard spelling of the name in Irish.

The letter É in RTÉ is often pronounced as the English letter E. However, in the Irish language, É is pronounced [eː].

=== Broadcasting ban ===
Under Section 31 of the Broadcasting Authority Act 1960, the Minister for Posts and Telegraphs of the day could direct RTÉ "not to broadcast any matter, or any matter of any particular class". In 1971, the first such directive was issued by Gerry Collins, directing RTÉ not to broadcast "any matter that could be calculated to promote the aims or activities of any organisation which engages in, promotes, encourages or advocates the attaining of any particular objective by violent means". A year later, Collins dismissed the entire RTÉ Authority over a report of an interview with Seán Mac Stíofáin, the chief of staff of the Provisional Irish Republican Army (Provisional IRA). RTÉ reporter Kevin O'Kelly had reported, not broadcast, his taped interview with Mac Stíofáin. He was briefly jailed for contempt in a court case arising out of the interview when Mac Stíofáin was charged with IRA membership. O'Kelly refused to identify Mac Stíofáin as the voice in his unbroadcast interview. The interview tape was seized from his house by the Garda Síochána (the police).

In 1976, Section 31 was amended by Conor Cruise O'Brien as the 1973–1977 Minister for Posts and Telegraphs. He issued a new annually based directive to the RTÉ Authority, prohibiting the broadcast of interviews or reports of interviews with spokespersons for, or representatives of, Sinn Féin, the IRA and other named organisations. RTÉ was also banned from broadcasting interviews or reports of interviews with spokespersons for any organisation banned in Northern Ireland under the UK's Northern Ireland (Emergency Provisions) Act 1973. The directives were reissued on an annual basis until January 1993.

During the late 1970s, RTÉ was accused of extending the censorship rules into a system of self-censorship. In addition, a small minority of programme-makers emerged who approved of Section 31, particularly supporters of the Workers' Party (formerly Sinn Féin the Workers' Party), including Eoghan Harris, and Gerry Gregg who opposed that party's official policy. Opponents of censorship, including then reporter and later Irish President Mary McAleese, were portrayed as secret IRA sympathisers. She described this experience as "the most difficult, the darkest, the worst time of my life".

The effect of the Section 31 ban was more severe than the censorship provision introduced in 1988 in the UK. The UK ban prevented the direct speech of censored individuals. Broadcasters then used actors' voices to dub the recorded speech of censored persons. This was not permissible on RTÉ, which was prevented from broadcasting 'reports' of interviews. British broadcasters interpreted the term spokesperson more loosely than did RTÉ, which banned all Sinn Féin members, whether or not they were speaking on behalf of the party. The BBC interviewed Sinn Féin President Gerry Adams as MP for West Belfast on 1 October 1990, speaking on unemployment in his constituency. Larry O'Toole, then an ordinary Sinn Féin member, mentioned this interview in a letter to RTÉ's director of news, Joe Mulholland, on 30 October 1990, after O'Toole was banned by RTÉ as a spokesperson for striking bakery workers. O'Toole then challenged the RTÉ ban in the High Court. In 1992–93, in the case O'Toole v. RTÉ, RTÉ was found by the High Court and Supreme Court to have illegally and unconstitutionally extended the censorship ban to Sinn Féin members who were not speaking on behalf of Sinn Féin. The RTÉ ban did not affect UK stations broadcasting in the Republic of Ireland because, at least until 1988, viewers in the Republic could still hear the voices of Sinn Féin representatives.

=== 21st century ===
In 2004, RTÉ and the Minister for Communications, Marine and Natural Resources agreed that in the future, RTÉ would operate under a Public Service Broadcasting Charter.

On 29 June 2005, the Minister appointed the members of a new RTÉ Authority, replacing the previous one appointed in June 2000. Fintan Drury, chairman of Platinum Sports Management and also chairman of Paddy Power plc, was appointed chairman of RTÉ. The other members of the Authority were Maria Killian, Patricia King, Ian Malcolm, Patrick Marron, Una Ní Chonaire, Emer Finnan, Stephen O'Byrnes and Joe O'Brien. The new Authority would hold office for not more than three years. On 11 January 2006, Fintan Drury resigned as chairman of RTÉ, citing a potential conflict of interest in his role as an advisor to the organisers of the Ryder Cup golf tournament and as chairman of a broadcaster involved in a row over broadcasting rights. This occurred after Irish government proposals to add the tournament to the list of sports events that must be broadcast on free-to-air terrestrial television, to which British Sky Broadcasting, the rights holders, objected. On 22 February 2006, Mary Finan was appointed chairperson of the RTÉ Authority.

In 2006, RTÉ was involved in a High Court case concerning referential bidding in relation to sponsoring weather forecasts: Smart Telecom PLC trading as Smart Telecom v Raidió Teilifís Éireann and by order Glanbia PLC.

In September 2006, the Government published the proposed text of the Broadcasting Bill 2006. It proposed that RTÉ and TG4 would become separate companies limited by guarantee (CLGs), with the Minister as the sole member of both companies (CLGs do not have shareholders). RTÉ would be legally obliged to agree on a charter every five years, publish a statement of commitments every year, and be under the jurisdiction of the proposed Broadcasting Authority of Ireland. The bill was delayed but finally introduced into Dáil Éireann (lit. 'Assembly of Ireland') on 14 April 2008. The Broadcasting Act 2009 retained RTÉ as a statutory corporation, renamed the RTÉ Authority as the RTÉ Board, and made changes to the way it is appointed. The Act also renamed the corporation Raidió Teilifís Éireann, with the Irish Times noting that this thereby fixed a "spelling error that lasted 40 years". In the meantime, the Broadcasting (Amendment) Act 2007 awarded RTÉ control of one multiplex for digital terrestrial television and gave it responsibilities in relation to broadcasting outside the state. In line with these responsibilities, RTÉ and the Government entered discussions regarding a new channel proposed to launch outside the Republic, which initially had the working title of Diaspora TV and later RTÉ International. In April 2007, TG4 became an independent statutory corporation, having previously been a wholly owned subsidiary of RTÉ since its inception. RTÉ continues to contribute programmes to the channel, including Nuacht TG4.

In July 2007, RTÉ began participating in a high definition (HD) trial in Dublin, showing programmes such as Planet Earth and Gaelic Athletic Association matches. RTÉ announced a plan to launch two further television channels: a general entertainment channel – RTÉ Three (working name) – and a timeshift service for RTÉ One – RTÉ One +1 (working name).

On 24 February 2009, the Minister for Communications, Energy, and Natural Resources appointed the members of a new RTÉ Authority, replacing the previous one appointed in June 2006. Tom Savage of the Communications Clinic was appointed chairman of RTÉ. The other members of the Authority were Patricia Quinn, Karlin Lillington, Fergus Armstrong, Alan Gilsenan, Seán O'Sullivan, Emer Finnan, and Cathal Goan (then Director General of RTÉ, serving as an ex officio member). The new Authority held office for not more than six months, due to changes planned under the Broadcasting Act 2009, which became law on 12 July 2009, dissolving the Authority and replacing it with an RTÉ Board. Under Section 179 (3) of the Act, any person who was a member of the Authority when the Act was signed into law continued as a member of the Board until the end of their term of office on 24 August 2009. Unlike the RTÉ Authority, the RTÉ Board does not have a self-regulatory function over RTÉ, as this was transferred to a newly appointed Broadcasting Authority of Ireland that replaces the Broadcasting Commission of Ireland in regulating commercial television and radio. This transfer helps assuage any concerns over potential bias that could be perceived under previous self-regulation by having a single regulator of public service and commercial Irish broadcasters into the future.

In 2009, RTÉ apologised to the then Taoiseach Brian Cowen for its role in the Brian Cowen nude portraits controversy. Future Taoiseach Enda Kenny and Charles Flanagan called RTÉ's backtracking a restriction on freedom of expression, and Liz McManus of the Labour Party criticised RTÉ for "bow[ing] to political pressure".

On 1 June 2009, the Sunday Independent reported that RTÉ was on the brink of bankruptcy. Such reports were denied by RTÉ, though the organisation acknowledged that, under its financial structure, there were "serious financial difficulties" and a review of its economic procedures was underway to be completed by 2010. On 11 June 2009, the director general of RTÉ, Cathal Goan, reported to the Oireachtas (parliament) that RTÉ was not bankrupt and that it would break even by year's end. On 3 July 2009, the RTÉ 2008 Annual Report was published. The organisation broke even in 2008. On 29 September 2009, RTÉ revealed a proposal for the regeneration of its existing building estimated to cost €350 million. If approved, the project would see the gradual replacement over a 10- to 15-year period of most of the current 1960s and 1970s buildings on the Donnybrook site. The new building would accommodate the switch-over to high-definition, additional channels, and new studios. RTÉ has since received planning consent from Dublin City Council for an application for the redevelopment of the station's Donnybrook site. The proposal for the site's redevelopment was accepted by local councillors in November 2009, with the subsequent appeal window closing in May 2010. The proposal would also involve building a new entrance onto the N11 Stillorgan dual carriageway.

The death of RTÉ broadcaster Gerry Ryan led to controversy for RTÉ, when it emerged that traces of cocaine were the "likely trigger" of the star's sudden death on 30 April 2010. Drugs Minister Pat Carey said he was "a bit taken aback, first of all, by the whole attitude of RTÉ over the last while" concerning the circumstances of Ryan's death. Comparing Ryan's cocaine use to the 2007 death of model Katy French, Carey said that the media were "very judgmental" when French died, but it had now "come home to roost in their own case".

In September 2010, RTÉ broadcast a controversial nine-minute radio interview with Taoiseach Brian Cowen from a Fianna Fáil think-in in Galway. The interview led to increased pressure for Cowen to resign in the days that followed after it was thought that he had been drunk on the radio.

On 9 November 2010, Noel Curran was appointed Director General of RTÉ for a five-year term starting 1 February 2011. He replaced Cathal Goan, who chose not to seek an extension to his seven-year term ending in January 2011. It was announced on 1 April 2016 that Dee Forbes would be the new director general.

In 2011, RTÉ was sued for defamation after making false allegations about a priest. On 23 May 2011, RTÉ aired a Prime Time Investigates programme called "Mission to Prey", which falsely claimed that the priest had raped a woman and fathered her child while working as a missionary in Kenya. In October 2011, RTÉ issued a public apology, stating that the allegations were baseless and should never have been broadcast. The priest said that he had been "living a nightmare" after the broadcaster made the allegations. The issue was serious enough to be discussed in both houses of the Oireachtas. In November 2011, the priest concerned reached an out-of-court settlement with RTÉ, in which RTÉ agreed that it had seriously libelled him and paid the priest a significant amount of money in damages. As a consequence, the managing director of news, Ed Mulhall, retired; the current affairs editor, Ken O'Shea, was moved to another department; and reporter Aoife Kavanagh resigned. The affair was described as "one of the gravest editorial mistakes ever made" in RTÉ's history.

In October 2011, RTÉ was forced to stop a "share deal" scheme that it had offered advertisers when TV3 complained to the Competition Authority.

On 24 October 2011, three days before the 2011 Irish presidential election, RTÉ hosted the final presidential debate on Pat Kenny's programme The Frontline, in which it controversially broadcast an unverified tweet mid-debate which was widely seen as damaging to the candidate Seán Gallagher. Gallagher had been the frontrunner in an opinion poll at that point. On election day, Gallagher received 28.5% of first preference votes in the election, leaving him in second place behind Michael D. Higgins. The Guardian, chronicling the reasons for Gallagher's fall in support, reported that a final RTÉ poll showed that 28% of Irish voters had changed their mind in the last week of the campaign, with 58% of those switching from Gallagher. On 7 March 2012, the Broadcasting Authority of Ireland upheld Gallagher's complaint about unfair treatment regarding how RTÉ handled the unverified tweet on the final Pat Kenny debate. On 19 December 2017, it was reported that RTÉ had agreed to pay Gallagher a sum of €130,000 as part of a confidential legal settlement arising from the debate.

== Finances ==
=== Bailout and future funding ===
After the fallout from the RTÉ secret payment scandal, the Irish government agreed to a programme of three years of funding; it agreed to fill the gap in collected licence fee revenue, which had seen evasion by the public rise sharply following the scandal. Combined funding from both the exchequer and the licence fees for 2025, 2026 and 2027 will total €750 million (€225 million in 2025, €240 million in 2026 and €260 million in 2027); the funding will be shared between RTÉ; Coimisiún na Meán's Sound and Vision Fund; and An Post (lit. 'The Post') for collection, with RTÉ taking at least 85% of the total fund.

In 2023, RTÉ had licence fee funding of €193.3 million and commercial revenues of €150.7 million, a total of €344 million.

=== Budget ===
In 2012, RTÉ received a total of €180,894,000 in public funding from the licence fee; it also received €127,100,000 in commercial revenue. RTÉ's total expenditure in 2012 was €327,023,000. The broadcaster had restructuring costs of €46,161,000 in 2012. Losses for the year came to €65,147,000.

Profit and loss across radio, television and online services for 2023
Key	Heading	RTÉ TV	RTÉ Radio	Other Activities	Totals
1	Licence Fee Revenue Attribution	116,561	37,354	39,381	193,296
2	Surplus on Commercial Activities	76,406	22,488	24,994	123,888
3	Distribution of Non-Channel Specific Contribution from Non-Public-Service Activities	11,444	2,470	(13,914)	0
4	Total Income	204,411	62,312	50,461	317,184
5	Gross Cost of Public Service Activities	(213,759)	(63,941)	(49,816)	(327,515)
6	Income Tax			1,215	1,215
7	Profit/Loss	(9,348)	(1,629)	1,860	(9,116)

Breakdown of Television and Radio
Key	RTÉ One	RTÉ2	RTÉ TV	Radio 1	2fm	Lyric FM	RnaG	RTÉ Radio
1	71,709	44,852	116,561	16,485	3,820	5,007	12,042	37,354
2	54,484	21,922	76,406	15,255	6,485	748	N/A	22,488
3	7,463	3,981	11,444	1,870	600	N/A	N/A	2,470
4	133,656	70,755	204,411	33,610	10,905	5,755	12,042	62,312
5	(139,407)	(74,352)	(213,759)	(34,932)	(11,212)	(5,755)	(12,042)	(63,941)
7	(5,751)	(3,597)	(9,348)	(1,322)	(307)	0	0	(1,629)

Breakdown of other activities
Key	TG4 support	RTÉ CO	Corp HQ	DTT costs	Online services	Other channels	Other	Adjustments	Total
1	7,586	5,966	N/A	765	15,488	5,586	3,990	N/A	39,381
2	N/A	1,543	34	N/A	8,002	N/A	15,313	102	16,890
3	N/A	N/A	N/A	N/A	1,399	N/A	(15,313)	N/A	(13,914)
4	7,586	7,509	34	765	24,889	5,585	3,990	N/A	50,358
5	(7,586)	(7,509)	1,304	(765)	(26,131)	(5,586)	(3,990)	447	(49,801)
6							1,215		1,215
7	0	0	1,339	0	(1,242)	0	1,215	549	1,861

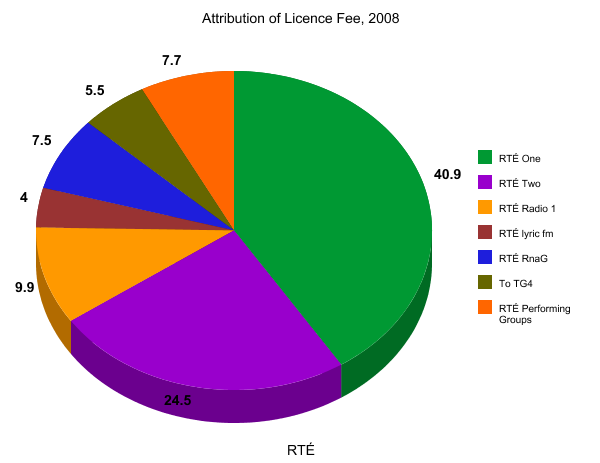
Attribution of licence fee, 2008

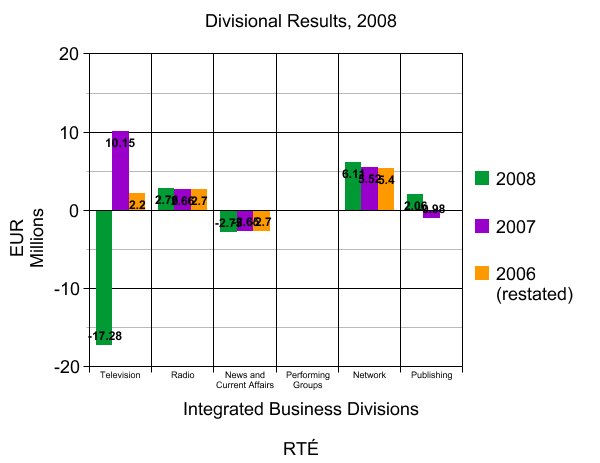
Divisional results, 2008

RTÉ receives income from three main sources:

- The television licence fee. Within the State, it is necessary to pay a fee of €160 per annum to legally possess any piece of equipment capable of receiving television signals (not necessarily those of RTÉ). This money is collected by An Post on behalf of the Minister for Culture, Communications and Sport. The state pays for television licence inspectors who have the power to obtain and execute search warrants for private houses. Failure to possess a valid television licence can result in a fine and a criminal record.
- Commercial revenue, including the sale of advertising and sponsorship. In the early 1990s, Minister Ray Burke imposed commercial revenue quotas to limit the amount of revenue that RTÉ could procure through advertising, in view of the corporation's licence fee income. While such quotas were later removed, RTÉ Radio and Television is still limited to six minutes of advertising per hour. The commercial division owned 0.086% of the satellite firm Intelsat, which it sold in 2005.
- A subvention from the Government to pay for any unpaid licence fees up to a certain amount, guaranteeing public funding.

Even though commercial quotas have been removed, commercial revenue and public funding each contribute roughly half of the organisation's income. The licence fee does not fund RTÉ Guide.

RTÉ 2fm (2FM) was set up as a self-sufficient radio station in 1978. This situation continued until 2011; since 2011, 2FM has received a portion of the licence fee. In 2023, the station received €3.8 million from the licence fee, or about 33% of its total cost base.

RTÉ also supports TG4 through an hour of television per day. This situation has continued since 1996. The vast majority of that time is for news and current affairs programming. Other received content includes Irish-language repeats and children's programming. In 2008, the portion of the licence fee that was set for "TG4 support" was €7.89 or 5%; by 2022, this portion had been reduced to 3%.

In 2011, as part of government cuts, TG4's direct exchequer funding was cut, which resulted in a portion of the fee going directly to TG4; however, the cut was reversed in 2018.

=== Breakdown of the licence fee ===
Breakdown of the television licence
Use	2022	2021	+/-	Redistribution	2010	2009	2008
				of €7.22			
	€	€		€	€	€	
RTÉ One	50.05	45.08	4.97	69%	61.03	62.00	59.35
RTÉ2	31.17	32.07	-0.90	-12%	36.20	31.57	34.09
RTÉ Television Total	81.22	77.15	4.07		97.23	93.56	93.44
RTÉ Radio 1	13.49	13.06	0.43	6%	13.08	16.70	14.24
RTÉ 2fm	2.60	2.49	0.11	2%	0.00	0.00	0.00
RTÉ RnaG	8.36	8.13	0.23	3%	8.50	9.06	10.73
RTÉ Lyric FM	3.54	3.36	0.18	2%	5.05	5.24	5.78
RTÉ Radio total	27.99	27.04	0.95		26.63	31.00	30.75
RTÉ Performing Groups *	3.88	9.15	-5.27	-73%	9.07	9.48	11.02
RTÉ Online Content	12.16	11.16	1.00	14%	-	-	-
RTÉ Other	6.97	7.74	-0.77	-11%	-	-	-
RTÉ Misc	2.26	2.22	0.04	1%	-	-	-
DDT / BROADCAST	0.49	0.34	0.15	2%	-	-	-
RTÉ total	134.97	134.80	0.17		132.93	134.05	135.21
RTÉ support for TG4	5.33	5.39	-0.06	-1%	6.36	7.50	7.89
BAI Levy	1.05	1.24	-0.19	-3%	1.04	0.63	0.00
BAI sound and vision fund	10.64	10.65	-0.01	-	10.57	8.45	7.53
An Post collection costs	8.01	7.92	0.09	1%	9.10	9.37	9.37
Total non-RTÉ costs	25.03	25.20	-0.17		27.07	25.95	24.79
Cost of Licence Fee	160.00	160.00			160.00	160.00	160.00

*In 2022, the National Concert Hall took control of the National Symphony Orchestra (Ireland), along with Cóir na nÓg, the Philharmonic Choir and RTÉ Quartet.

=== RTÉ personality salaries ===
In October 2009, RTÉ's former director general, Cathal Goan, said there was "no question that by today's standards" the salaries paid to its top presenters in 2008 'were excessive'. I have to repeat that they were set at a different time in a different competitive reality where some of this talent might be up for poaching by other organisations and in RTÉ's view at the time, they delivered value for money ". The political party Fine Gael said that the high salaries were "rubbing salt in the wounds" for people who had lost their jobs or taken significant pay cuts. Labour criticised RTÉ for not releasing the data sooner and said that "This information should be easily available and there should be no question of concealing it or making it in any way inaccessible". Many of the highest-paid stars are not technically members of staff but are paid through separate companies, enabling them and the station to avoid paying taxes on their salaries.

Former Director General Dee Forbes tackled the matter in 2022 by saying, "Some 1% of our cost base goes towards our top-paid employees." She later resigned due to an agreement that she arranged to pay Ryan Tubridy €75,000 extra, which would come from RTÉ's "Barter account"; she agreed that RTÉ would underwrite the payment and later was required to pay out the fee to Tubridy. She also signed off on an exit for Chief Financial Officer Breda O'Keefe under the terms of a voluntary exit scheme at the broadcaster.

In February 2023, RTÉ published the list of salaries paid to its top ten personalities in 2021:

1. Ryan Tubridy: €515,000 (as revised in June 2023), €440,000 (as published in February 2023)
2. Joe Duffy: €351,000
3. Claire Byrne: €350,000
4. Ray D'Arcy: €305,000
5. Miriam O'Callaghan: €263,000
6. Brendan O'Connor: €245,004
7. Bryan Dobson: €209,282
8. Mary Wilson: €196,961
9. Darragh Maloney: €183,738
10. George Lee: €179,131

The above presenters are treated by RTÉ as independent contractors, rather than as employees, meaning that RTÉ does not have to pay the employer's Pay Related Social Insurance contribution.

=== 2023 secret payment and management pay scandal ===
It emerged publicly in June 2023, as executive management had known since early March 2023, that the figures previously published relating to Ryan Tubridy's earnings were inaccurate; these earnings had been supplied, at least in part, through a barter account, attracting substantial additional costs. In addition, the costs of Tubridy hosting commercial events for advertising partner Renault were paid by RTÉ. The resulting scandal was associated with massive public disquiet, political commentary and the resignation of RTÉ's director general. The chair of the RTÉ Board said that the scandal was a "serious breach of trust with the public", with more than an additional €80,000 spent on fees associated with the transfer of €150,000 of that extra money. It was revealed the next day that the outgoing director general of RTÉ, Dee Forbes, had been suspended from her employment a day before the controversy and had issued a statement defending her record. Taoiseach Leo Varadkar described the failure as a breach of trust and truth between RTÉ and the Government, the Oireachtas and the people. On 26 June 2023, Forbes tendered her resignation with immediate effect. Adrian Lynch, the director of channels and marketing, was appointed to the position of deputy director general and also assumed the role of interim director general following Forbes' suspension and resignation, before the planned arrival of Kevin Bakhurst in that role on 11 July.

On 27 June, the acting director general of RTÉ, Adrian Lynch, issued a nine-page statement addressing the circumstances around the revelations, stating that no member of the Executive Board other than Director General Forbes could have known that figures publicly declared for Tubridy were wrong and that external legal advice had found that there was "no illegality" and "payments were made pursuant to an agreed contract". Lynch added that while RTÉ's director of content, Jim Jennings, had signed off on the payments deal, he was "not aware" that the broadcaster was "underwriting" any payments that were now under scrutiny. Lynch also stated that there was "no finding of wrongdoing" against Tubridy or the commercial partner involved in what happened. Taoiseach Varadkar described the idea that only Forbes had this knowledge as "not credible". Meanwhile, at lunchtime, around 200 journalists, reporters and correspondents working for RTÉ joined a protest organised by the National Union of Journalists to speak of their hurt, disappointment and anger at the way a small number of managers had betrayed and badly damaged the organisation and those who worked for it.

Seven representatives from RTÉ attended a meeting of the Oireachtas Media Committee on 28 June. This committee heard that RTÉ Board chair Siún Ní Raghallaigh, after a recommendation from a board committee – but without consulting the relevant minister – asked Forbes to resign on 16 June, and Forbes refused; after this refusal, a disciplinary process was begun. The committee also heard that Tubridy was due a €120,000 "loyalty bonus" which, for some "unexplained reason", was credited against his earnings between 2017 and 2019. The committee asked why a fresh resignation tendered on 26 June was accepted, obstructing the committee's work; while the question was not fully answered, the chair did accept that the potential impact on the investigation of the controversy was not noticed by the Board before it accepted Forbes's resignation. Senior executives attended a meeting of the Public Accounts Committee the next day, hearing that RTÉ used its controversial barter account to pay €275,000 for tickets and travel for clients attending the Rugby World Cup, 10-year Irish Rugby Football Union (IRFU) tickets and the Champions League Final in 2019, an expenditure described by the chair as "outrageous".

In the wake of this scandal, it was reported that income from the TV licence had fallen by over €14 million compared to 2022, a 31% drop, as people refused to renew their licences.

==== Barter accounts ====
Much controversy arose around the use of barter accounts to pay Tubridy's add-on monies, but these accounts then became the subject of wider interest. However, in clarifying that substantial sums had been handled through multiple such "barter accounts", RTÉ defended their use, claiming that they are a normal feature of the media market; RTÉ also claimed that while it spent around €150,000 per annum on entertaining advertising clients from barter accounts, the broadcaster took in around €150 million in advertising revenue annually. At a meeting of the Oireachtas Public Accounts Committee, RTÉ stated that such accounts had been used to spend between €1 million and €1.25 million in the last 10 years, on such entertainment as a trip to the Rugby World Cup in 2019, Champions League Final tickets, and 10-year tickets from the IRFU. The broadcaster gave the additional example of a sporting trip costing €111,000 which was for customers who had spent €38 million with the station during the previous year. RTÉ feared that without such "gifts", they might not have been able to secure this advertising spend. The tax treatment of such gifts was not mentioned.

==== Management and star pay ====
In documents supplied to the Oireachtas, RTÉ listed the earnings of its 100 highest-paid employees and contractors, all with pay in excess of €116,000 and 84 being employees. Including the members of the RTÉ Executive Board, 69 of these highest-earners are managers, and the other 31 are presenters and other technical or non-managerial staff. The director general was paid €225,000 in 2021, along with a car allowance of €25,000 and pension contributions of €56,000, for a total package of €306,000; the chief financial officer earns around €200,000 plus a car allowance of around €25,000 (and any pension element is not disclosed).

The broadcaster's staff numbers around 1,800, in addition to contractors. In 2022, 119 employees had basic pay of more than €100,000, 22 of those having salaries of €150,000–250,000; 179 staff had salaries of €80,000–100,000, 550 had €60,000–80,000, and 740 had €40,000–60,000.

It further emerged that aside from the large number of management posts and their high salary levels, there were exit schemes offered by RTÉ's Human Resources function; under these schemes, more than €2.3 million was paid out to a number of departing managers and executives. At least one of these payments was rumoured to be on the order of €400,000. In addition, there were schemes for ordinary staff. At least one executive package was not approved by or known to most executive board members, although it should have been approved by that panel.

== Organisation ==
=== RTÉ Board and leadership team ===
RTÉ is a statutory corporation. Under its original governance arrangements (under the Broadcasting Authority Act 1960), its board was known as the RTÉ Authority. The members of the RTÉ Authority were appointed by the Cabinet upon the recommendation of the Minister for Communications, Marine and Natural Resources. The RTÉ Authority was both the legal owner of RTÉ (under the 1960 Act, it constituted RTÉ itself) and also its regulator. Under the Broadcasting Act 2009, RTÉ's governance arrangements have changed. The statutory corporation form has been retained, but the new Act no longer refers to the board of RTÉ as an "Authority"; it is now simply known as the Board. Of the 12 members of the Board which replaced the RTÉ Authority, the Minister appoints six, using input from the Public Appointments Service. The Oireachtas Committee on the Environment, Climate and Communications decides on four names to present to the Minister for appointment; one member is elected by the staff of RTÉ; and the director general sits on the Board ex officio. The remaining members of the RTÉ Authority were reappointed to the new Board in the interim. The provisions of the Act relating to the Broadcasting Authority of Ireland were commenced on 1 October 2009 (under Statutory Instrument 389 of 2009 of the Broadcasting Act 2009). RTÉ is externally regulated by Coimisiún na Meán.

As of 2024, the RTÉ organisation consists of six primary divisions:

- Commercial (incorporating the RTÉ Guide and the RTÉ Concert Orchestra)
- Audience, Channels and Marketing
- Content
- News & Current Affairs
- Network
- Operations & Production Services

The organisation also includes a Corporate Headquarters which is responsible for centralised activities.

The Irish-language channel, TG4, was operated as an RTÉ subsidiary (Seirbhísí Theilifís na Gaeilge Teoranta) before its separation from RTÉ on 1 April 2007.

The RTÉ Board appoints the director general of RTÉ, who in effect fulfils the dual role of chief executive and editor-in-chief. The director general heads the RTÉ Leadership Team, which comprises the company's top management and includes the directors of channels, content, news and current affairs, and commercial, the chief financial officer, and the heads of technology and operations, human resources and strategy.

== Broadcasting ==
=== Radio ===
The first voice broadcast of 2RN, the original radio call sign for Radio 1, took place on 14 November 1925 when Seamus Clandillon – the 2RN station director – said, "Seo Raidió 2RN, Baile Átha Cliath ag tástáil", which is Irish for "This is Radio 2RN, Dublin calling". Regular Irish radio broadcasting began on 1 January 1926. Unfortunately, most Irish people could not receive 2RN's (1.5 kilowatt) signal. When faced with numerous complaints from Cork regarding the writers' inability to tune to the signal, Clandillon remarked in The Irish Radio Review, a magazine dedicated to the service, that they did not know how to operate their sets. The station 6CK was established in Cork in 1927; much of this station's output was simply a relay of the national service, but 6CK also had significant input into the programmes of 2RN until it was closed down in the 1950s.

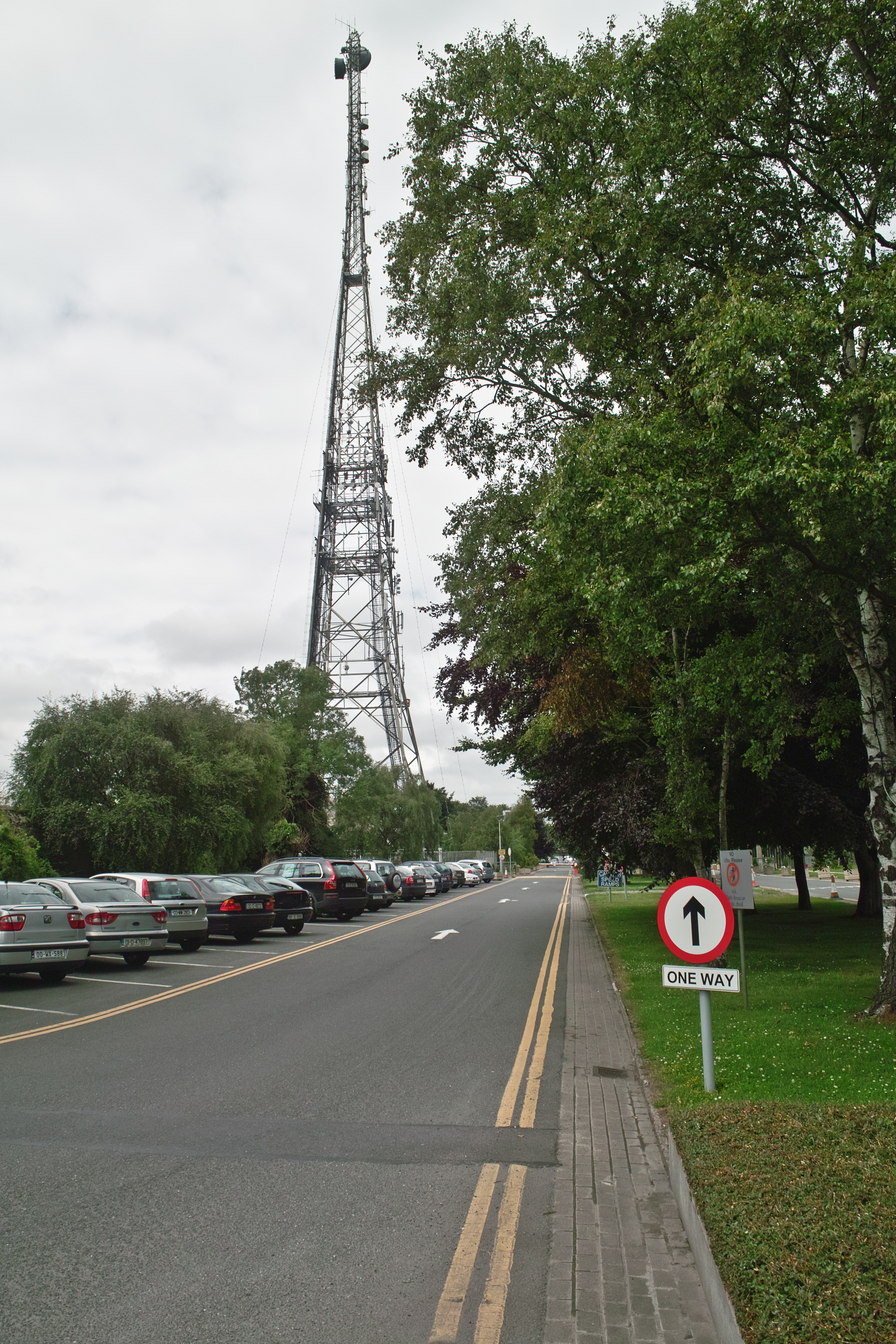
RTÉ links mast at the Donnybrook campus

A high-power station (initially 60 kW) was established in Athlone in 1932 to coincide with the Eucharistic Congress. 2RN, 6CK and Athlone became known as "Radio Athlone" (Irish: Raidió Áth Luain) and could be received across virtually the entire country. Radio Athlone became known as "Radio Éireann" in 1938.

Radio Éireann tried to satisfy all tastes on a single channel (with limited programming hours). However, the attempt resulted in a rather conservative programming policy. This policy was barely tolerated by most Irish listeners, and the station was usually outperformed by the BBC and later Radio Luxembourg (particularly on the east coast and along the Northern Ireland border). This situation changed only when Radio Éireann became free of direct government control in 1960.
In 1971, the radio service started the move from the general post office (GPO) in the centre of Dublin, where it had been housed since 1928, into a new purpose-built Radio Centre beside the existing Television Centre on the Donnybrook campus.

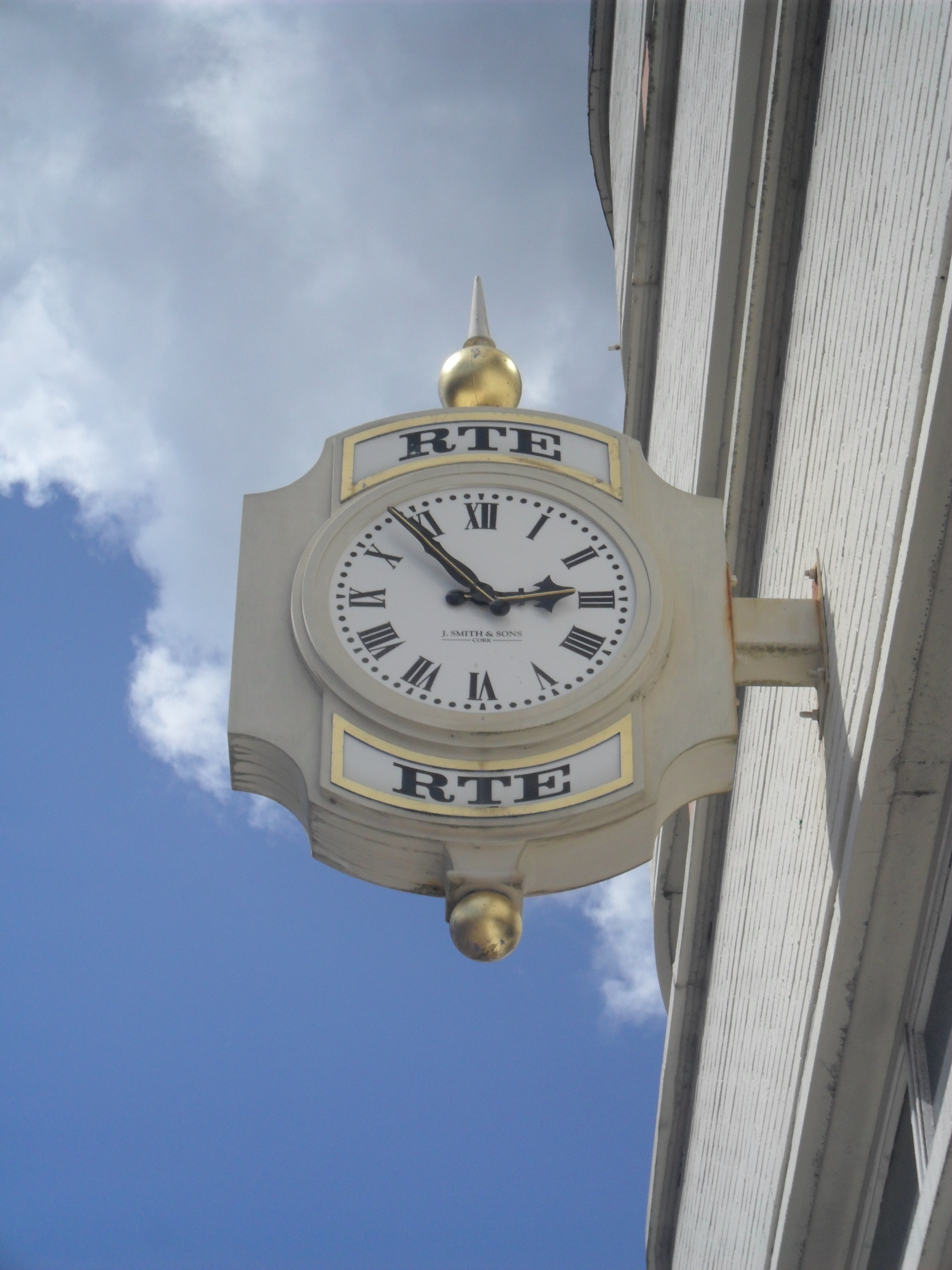
Clock at the RTÉ buildings in Cork

RTÉ has a nationwide communications network with an increasing emphasis on regional news-gathering and input. Broadcasting on Radio 1 provides comprehensive coverage of news, current affairs, music, drama and variety features, agriculture, education, religion and sport, mostly in English but also some in Irish. RTÉ 2fm is a popular music and chat channel which commenced broadcasting as RTÉ Radio 2 on 31 May 1979; Brendan Balfe was the first voice heard on the station at midday when he introduced the first presenter, Larry Gogan. RTÉ lyric fm serves the interests of classical music and the arts, coming on air in May 1999 and replacing FM3 Classical Music; this station had catered for the same target audience and time-shared with RTÉ Raidió na Gaeltachta, an exclusively Irish-language service, which began broadcasting on Easter Sunday, 2 April 1972. Formerly, RTÉ operated RTÉ Radio Cork (previously "Cork 89FM" and "RTÉ Cork Local Radio"), a local radio service in Cork, but it closed down in 2000.

A slightly adapted version of Radio 1 is broadcast as RTÉ Europe on Eurobird; the main difference between this and the main FM feed is the inclusion of several programmes taken from RTÉ Raidió na Gaeltachta. RTÉ Radio is available on the UK Freesat service.

Digital Audio Broadcasting (DAB) test broadcasts of RTÉ's four stations began on 1 January 2006, along the east coast of Ireland; these broadcasts also carried the private Today FM and World Radio Network, to which RTÉ is a contributing broadcaster. DAB was launched to the public in late 2006 with six RTÉ digital-only stations – RTÉ 2XM, RTÉ Chill, RTÉ Gold, RTÉ Junior, RTÉ Pulse and RTÉ Radio 1 Extra – as well as the four terrestrial services. RTÉ also offered two other DAB services, RTÉ Digital Radio News and RTÉ Choice. RTÉ ceased its DAB services on 31 March 2021 because of declining usage. RTÉ's radio stations are also carried on digital cable and satellite platforms in Ireland, as well as on digital terrestrial television; RTÉ Radio 1 has been carried on shortwave in Digital Radio Mondiale (DRM) during specific events, including the All-Ireland finals.

In August 2009, faced with declining listenership, David Quinn – organiser of the Iona Institute, a religiously motivated pressure group – advised that RTÉ had "alienated some of the audience it ought to be going after" and should "try to be more even-handed in its treatment of the issues of the day instead of pushing every PC cause going."

With the closure of Saor Raidió Chonamara ("Free Radio Connemara"), it showed the importance and it showed awareness for the Irish language. With this in mind, it forced RTÉ to agree to join with Raidió na Gaeltachta, which is still present today.

=== Television ===
In Ireland, RTÉ One and RTÉ2 are RTÉ's flagship channels; they are broadcast on Saorview (Ireland's digital television system) along with RTÉ News, RTÉ KIDSjr and timeshift services (RTÉ One +1, and RTÉ2 +1).

==== Timeline ====
===== 1920s =====
Ireland was one of the first countries in Europe to embrace the medium of radio, but the country was a relative latecomer to television. Unlike its European counterparts, the Government of Ireland did not use the medium of television until 31 December 1961. Countries such as the United Kingdom (1929), France (1935) and Italy (1954) embraced television long before Ireland did. Before the launch of RTÉ as the national broadcaster, television services were available, though limited, from Northern Ireland through BBC Northern Ireland (1955) and UTV (1959). The construction of the Divis transmitter in Northern Ireland in July 1955 allowed overspill of these services into the Republic.

===== 1950s =====
In the late 1950s, a Television Committee was formed; its goal was to set up an Irish television service with as little financial support from the Government as possible. The committee initially recommended setting up a service along the lines of ITV, using five mountain tops as transmission sites, which were also equipped for FM radio transmission. However, since Éamon de Valera was somewhat wary of television, no further significant action was taken until Seán Lemass succeeded him as Taoiseach in 1959. A year later, Radio Éireann was converted from an arm of the Department of Posts and Telegraphs into a semi-state body and given responsibility for television. Eamonn Andrews was appointed as the new chairman. A site for a new Television Production Centre had been found in 1959, and construction began in October 1960.

===== 1960s =====
Telefís Éireann began broadcasting at 19:00 on New Year's Eve in 1961. The channel was launched with an opening address by then-president de Valera. Other messages were delivered by Cardinal d'Alton and Lemass; following these, a live concert was broadcast from the Gresham Hotel in Dublin. The show, which was a countdown to the new year, was hosted by Andrews, with appearances by tenor Patrick O'Hagan (father of singer Johnny Logan), the Artane Boys' Band and commentator Michael O'Hehir. Television became an important force within Irish culture as it helped to explore topics often deemed controversial, such as abortion and contraception. Development of the entertainment show The Late Late Show began in July 1962, and it is still being broadcast. Such programming helped to influence the changing social structure of Ireland. Telefís Éireann began to explore children's television around this time, producing the groundbreaking show Wanderly Wagon, which inspired a generation with characters such as Judge and Mr Crow.

===== 1970s =====
In 1978, the Government of Ireland approved the launch of a second public service channel to be operated by RTÉ. RTÉ2 – later rebranded as Network 2 in 1988 and renamed RTÉ Two in 2004 – had a public service remit providing Irish-language services, while also offering alternative services, mainly programming from the US and UK.

===== 1990s =====
During the 1990s, like other European broadcasters, RTÉ began expanding its services to provide regional variety. RTÉ developed its only major studio complex outside Dublin in Cork. RTÉ Cork opened in 1995 and became a huge success. It also became a large contributor to network output on both Radio One and RTÉ One. Also in 1995, RTÉ opened a regional broadcasting studio in Limerick. In 1996, the Irish-language television service TG4 (previously Teilifís na Gaeilge) was launched from Galway. Meanwhile, RTÉ provided Irish-language services, such as news bulletins (Nuacht) and the long-running documentary series Léargas.

===== 2000s =====
RTÉ Television began to expand its output through the development of digital television. RTÉ Television services became widely available in Northern Ireland via terrestrial overspill or on cable. (Coverage and inclusion on cable systems vary.) Since 23 April 2002 (18 April 2005 in Northern Ireland), these channels have also been available via satellite on Sky; however, some sports programmes and other shows are blocked to Northern Ireland viewers because of rights issues between Ireland and the United Kingdom.

In January 2007, RTÉ announced plans to launch a channel – with the working title of RTÉ International – which would offer programmes from RTÉ One and RTÉ Two as well as TG4. As of 2023, however, this service has yet to materialise.

===== 2010s =====
On 26 May 2011, RTÉ television launched Saorview – a public service mux for digital terrestrial television – and Saorsat. RTÉ also launched RTÉ Two HD, RTÉjr, RTÉ One +1 and RTÉ News Now on Saorview on the same day.

For the 50th anniversary of RTÉ television, broadcaster John Bowman produced a history of RTÉ Television titled Window and Mirror. RTÉ Television: 1961–2011, which was launched by Taoiseach Enda Kenny at the National Museum in Dublin on 23 November 2011.

At 10:00 am on 24 October 2012, all analogue television transmission ended in Ireland; RTÉ's television channels are now available only digitally on Saorview, satellite and cable. Also on 24 October 2012, for the first time, RTÉ 1 and RTÉ 2 were broadcast from transmitters within Northern Ireland on the UK Freeview system.

In December 2014, RTÉ made television advertising history by airing the first-ever native HD advertisement in the United Kingdom and Ireland. The commercial was part of the 3 Mobile Christmas campaign. It was created by Dublin creative agency Boys & Girls and was delivered by global delivery specialists IMD.

=== News ===
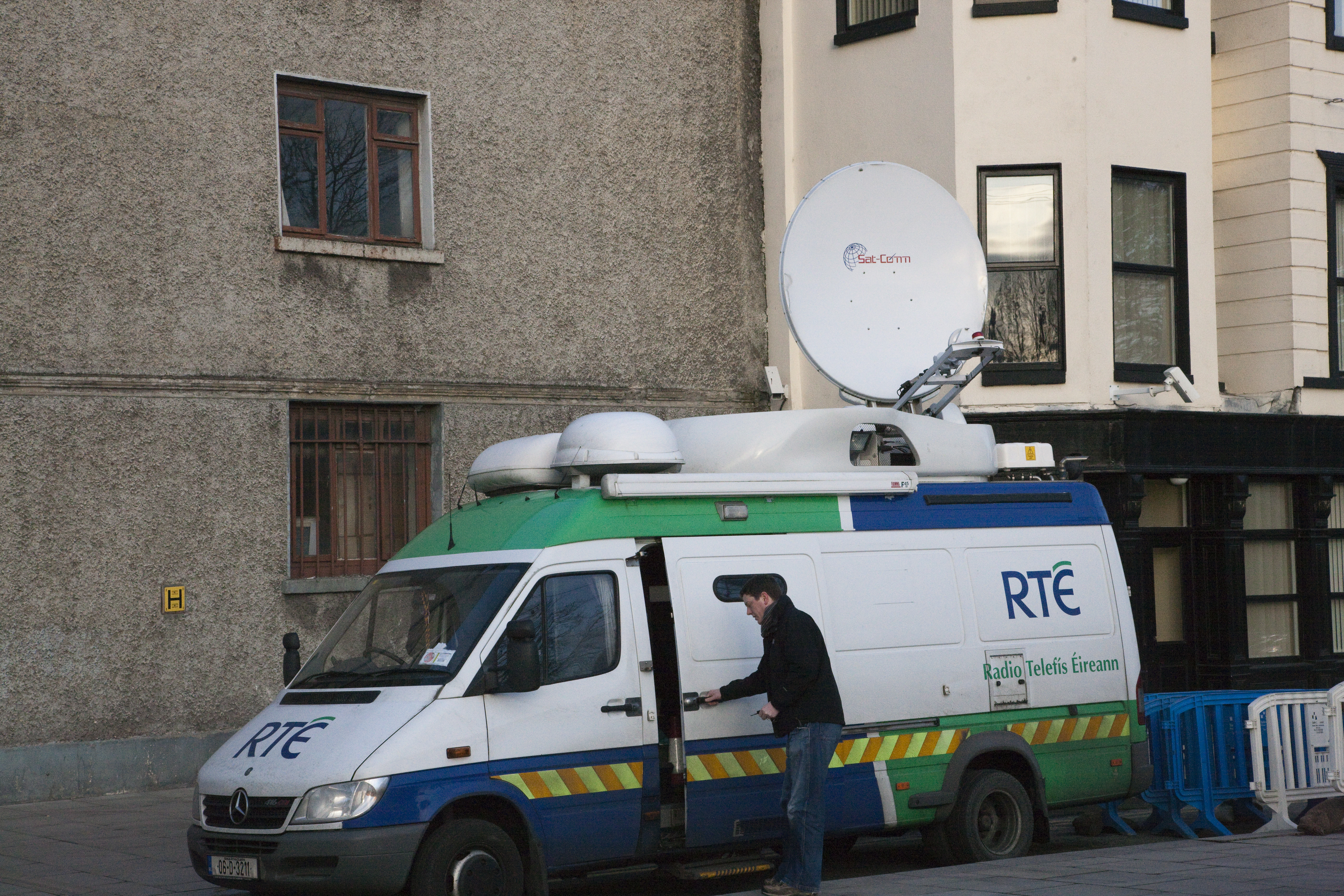
An RTÉ satellite van

RTÉ News and Current Affairs, or Nuacht agus Cúrsaí Reatha RTÉ in Irish, is a major division of Raidió Teilifís Éireann responsible for news programming on television, radio and online within Ireland. It is, by far, the largest and most popular news source in Ireland – 77% of the Irish public regard it as their main source of both Irish and international news. The division broadcasts in both the Irish and English languages, as well as Irish Sign Language.

RTÉ News and Current Affairs provides a range of national and international news and current affairs programming in Ireland. The organisation is also a source of commentary on current affairs. RTÉ News is based in the RTÉ Television Centre at Donnybrook, Dublin, Ireland.

RTÉ News faces competition from within Ireland and abroad. Within Ireland, competition is provided by several sources: Virgin Media News and Nuacht TG4 in the television sector, and Bauer Media Audio Ireland in the radio sector. BBC Newsline and UTV Live provide alternative news services from Northern Ireland; in addition, global news channels are widely available, such as Euronews, CNN International, CNBC, France 24, Bloomberg, BBC World News and Sky News, among many others.

RTÉ News and Current Affairs produces over 1,000 hours of television programming and 2,000 hours of radio programming per year.

In the 1970s, Sinn Féin (the political wing of the Official IRA) were said to have progressively infiltrated RTÉ's Current Affairs Department through the Ned Stapleton Cuman (a branch of the Workers' Party), which was organised by Eoghan Harris.

RTÉ's gaffe in January 2009 – over the need for International Monetary Fund (IMF) intervention in the Republic – was picked up by news wires. Bloomberg noted how German stocks fell sharply, while Reuters reported that the euro dipped by a cent against the dollar before it stabilised following a strong denial.

RTÉ's producers and researchers were accused by journalist Kevin Myers of imposing a liberal agenda, first on one another and later on the airwaves, though without consciously intending to do so. RTÉ News has also been described by Myers as behaving like a press officer for public sector unions.

=== Sport ===
RTÉ is a major broadcaster of sports programming in Ireland. Gaelic football, hurling, football and rugby are all broadcast live on radio and television, and increasingly online. The broadcaster also transmits live golf, boxing, athletics, horse-racing and show-jumping, and other minority sports, usually when there is significant Irish participation or the event is held in Ireland. The broadcaster has secured many events free-to-air, which might otherwise become pay-per-view. RTÉ also has the rights to broadcast the FIFA World Cup 2022.

=== Weather ===
Weather forecasts are provided at the end of most news on radio and television. Met Éireann have been providing these forecasts since 1948 to Radio Éireann and from 1962 onward for television broadcasts.

=== Internet ===
The URL "RTE.ie" is the brand name and home of RTÉ's online activities. The website began publishing on 26 May 1996. It operates on an entirely commercial basis, receiving none of the licence fee which funds much of RTÉ's activity. The website is funded by advertising and section sponsorship. As of 2007, it is among the top 5,000 most visited websites globally (by Alexa ranking) and among the top 20 sites in Ireland, with certified impressions of almost 40 million per month and more than 1.5 million unique users.

=== RTÉ Player ===
On 21 April 2009, RTÉ launched its on-demand service RTÉ Player. The service allows broadband users in Ireland to view some of RTÉ's top-rated homegrown television series (i.e., RTÉ News and The Late Late Show) and international series (i.e., Home and Away and Grey's Anatomy) free of charge. A pared-down version is available outside Ireland. Director General Kevin Bakhurst stated another revamp of the website and apps was expected in 2026.

=== RTÉ and Netflix ===
On 13 September 2012, RTÉ Digital confirmed that it had signed a deal with the online subscription service Netflix to host RTÉ's programming. Episodes of RTÉ television dramas and comedies, including The Clinic, Trivia, Killinaskully, and Mattie, would be added to Netflix and available outside Ireland under this deal.

== Other activities ==
=== Digital ===
The RTÉ Digital division replaced the RTÉ Publishing division in 2012 and operates six media services:

- RTÉ.ie – online news, sport and entertainment services
- RTÉ Player/RTÉ Radio Player – on-demand and live streams of all of RTÉ's national radio and television networks
- RTÉ Aertel – a teletext service which has news, sport and programme support information
- RTÉ News App – live/catch-up news service, online and on mobile
- RTÉ Archives – central repository for all RTÉ broadcasts (Television and Radio), in addition to stills material collected and preserved by RTÉ

The Digital division has the following areas of responsibility:

- Sales of music copyright
- Maintenance of the television channel archives and news library
- Sales of library and archive material
- Maintenance of the radio channel archive and library
- Provision of RTÉ Aertel teletext services
- Provision of free-to-the-public, web-based public services
- Operation of the RTÉ Player for domestic and international audiences
- Sales of online banner advertising and sponsorship
- Sales of teletext advertising and sponsorship
- Commercial Telecoms revenue
- Incubation and development of new media technologies
- Administration of RTÉ Digital IBD
- Provision of additional opportunities to access RTÉ's public service news content via RTÉ News Now Online

=== Orchestras ===
Since 2022, RTÉ has supported only one orchestra, the RTÉ Concert Orchestra. The rest of RTÉ's performing groups are now based at the National Concert Hall.

==== History ====
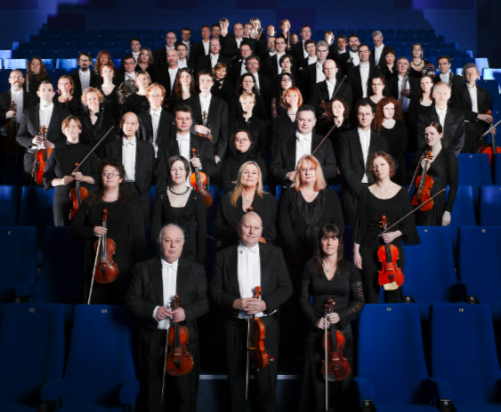
National Symphony Orchestra (Ireland)

RTÉ Orchestras Quartet & Choirs supported two full-time orchestras – the RTÉ Concert Orchestra and RTÉ National Symphony Orchestra – as well as the RTÉ Vanbrugh Quartet, RTÉ Philharmonic Choir and RTÉ Cór na nÓg.

In 2021, RTÉ and the National Concert Hall were given approval to move the RTÉ National Symphony Orchestra, as well as the RTÉ Vanbrugh Quartet, RTÉ Philharmonic Choir and RTÉ Cór na nÓg.

The following groups perform regularly in the National Concert Hall in Dublin:

- National Symphony Orchestra
- RTÉ Concert Orchestra
- Philharmonic Choir
- Cór na nÓg
- Vanbrugh Quartet

=== Infrastructure ===
RTÉ Transmission Network DAC (branded as 2RN and formerly RTÉ NL) is a wholly owned subsidiary; it provides transmission services for all of RTÉ's own channels and for competing stations such as Virgin Media Ireland, TG4 and Today FM.

==== Saorview ====
Saorview, founded by 2rn (RTÉ Networks), is the name for the Irish free-to-air digital terrestrial television (DTT). The service was launched as a trial on 31 October 2010 to 90% of the population, and it was officially launched on 26 May 2011. Set-top boxes are available for the service. Saorview is free, although an MPEG-4 DVB-T box and a UHF aerial are required. 2RN can provide commercial DTT capacity on its network for any pay TV service that can agree terms with it and Coimisiún na Meán (formerly the Broadcasting Authority of Ireland); however, there has been little bidding for this capacity.

Analogue television transmission ended on 24 October 2012, and Saorview became the primary source of Irish terrestrial television.

==== Saorsat ====
Saorsat is a free-to-air digital satellite television service in Ireland that is operated by 2rn. It provides television services to the 2% of Irish households who are unable to access Saorview services.

=== Logo ===
In 1995, the RTÉ logo removed its Brigid's cross, and for the first time placed an accent (fada) on the letter E. In addition, RTÉ formally branded Network Two on-screen as part of RTÉ until 1997, when the channel was again rebranded on-screen as N2. The three letters in RTÉ's logo are a modern take on Celtic script. The Brigid's cross was seen on many RTÉ One television idents until 2003 and remains on the headed paper of RTÉ, while a variation of the 1966 cross is used by RTÉ's Graphic Design Department. Since 2004, all RTÉ services have used the 1996 logo as part of their identity.

In September 2014, RTÉ rebranded its network after a tendering process introduced in February 2014. In 2015, RTÉ Archives launched a new logo which incorporated the 1969 branding for the word Archive.

1961–1966

1966–1969

1969–1986

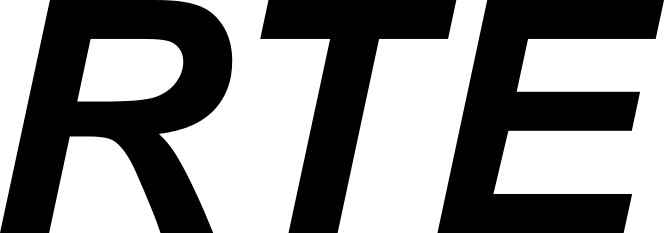
1980–1986 (alternate)

1987–1995

1995–2014

2014–present

RTÉ 100th anniversary of broadcasting (2026)

== Moral controversies ==
The Late Late Show has been involved in a number of controversies since first being broadcast on television in July 1962, particularly during presenter Gay Byrne's tenure. These controversies included the "Bishop and the Nightie Affair" in 1966, as well as a 1985 interview with a pair of lesbian former nuns. This interview led to protesters picketing the studio with hymns and rosary beads after a High Court case — during which there were calls for the chat show to be outlawed over fears it would "greatly undermine Christian moral values" and "the respect of the general public for nuns". Controversial incidents during presenter Pat Kenny's tenure included a satanic dance troupe performance and the tearing up of two tickets for The Late Late Toy Show live on air.

The first sex scandal on Irish TV concerned a sketch-drawing advertisement for Bri-Nylon underwear, involving a "lewd and lascivious" cartoon of Antony and Cleopatra.

Writer Wesley Burroughs was criticised by RTÉ authorities after it became apparent that actress Biddy White Lennon – who portrayed the character Maggie Riordan – appeared more pregnant each week on The Riordans, an RTÉ soap opera that he wrote for. On this show, Maggie Riordan was an unmarried woman. Burroughs was forced to consult medical texts to provide Maggie with an alternative illness to explain her appearance.

The television drama series The Spike, broadcast on RTÉ in 1978, was involved in a sex scandal.

In 1986, Mandy Smith was scheduled to be interviewed on the television programme Saturday Live, until RTÉ decided that she should be downgraded to an audience member. She was cancelled entirely when her manager disagreed, with RTÉ saying that she was "not important enough" and that she might "give a bad example to young teenage girls". The story appeared in the international media.

In 2017, RTÉ sports producer Kieran Creaven was convicted on multiple counts of child sexual abuse in the UK. He had worked with RTÉ since 2002.

== See also ==
- List of programmes broadcast by Telefís Éireann
- Television in Ireland
