= Oprah's Favorite Things =

Annual segment on The Oprah Winfrey Show

"Oprah's Favorite Things" The Oprah Winfrey Show from the 1990s to 2008 and 2010, as well as on Rachael Ray in 2017. In the segment, which airs during Thanksgiving week and was inspired by the holiday song "My Favorite Things" from The Sound of Music, Oprah Winfrey shared products with her audience that she felt were noteworthy or that would make a great gift. In addition, the audience members that were present during the taping of the episode receive items from that year's list for free.

The term is also sometimes used to describe a similar feature in O, The Oprah Magazine; while that may formally have been named "The O List" in the past, it has more recently shared the "Oprah's Favorite Things" name. The two features are often coordinated.

After being featured on the Oprah's Favorite Things segment, businesses typically experience a large boost in their website traffic and in visits to their stores. For small businesses with limited resources and a small staff, the resulting boost in customers can cause the business to become overwhelmed and unable to meet customer demands. According to Scott Schroeder, executive vice president and chief financial officer of Garrett Popcorn Shops, being featured on the episode resulted in over 100,000 hits to the website on the afternoon the episode was aired and sales increased in December by over 100%. This caused the business to go from "making popcorn eight hours a day to 24 hours a day".

== Episodes ==
The Oprah's Favorite Things television episode is the most watched episode each year of The Oprah Winfrey Show. The episode has traditionally been aired around Thanksgiving, though its producers do not announce when the special episode will be taped. Furthermore, the audience members of these episodes are commonly selected based on a specific characteristic, which means tickets can be difficult to obtain.

=== 2002 ===
The items presented in the 2002 episode were included in one of four categories: food favorites; beauty and body care; books, music and home; and high-tech discoveries. The items included on the list were:

- Key lime pie
- Heart's Desire from Jan de Luz Linens
- Croissants from Galaxy
- Fat Witch Baby Gift Tin
- Good Karmal Mini Crates
- Holiday tin from Garrett Popcorn Shops
- MarieBelle Hot Chocolate Powder
- Cranberry Creations Chocolates by NantucketChocolate.com
- Piper-Heidsieck Champagne
- Pillsbury Homebaked Classics Frozen Biscuits
- BlissLabs Glamour Gloves and Glamour Gel
- Origins A Perfect World White Tea Body Cream
- Kiehl's Limited Edition Gift Box
- What to Wear
- DreamTime Foot Cozys
- Velour Sweatsuit
- Karen Neuburger Pajamas and Socks
- Silver Ox Cuff Watch
- Tube Readers and Case
- Fashion Active Labs Perfect Tee
- Books, Music and Home
- Everyday Grace by Marianne Williamson
- Johnny Mathis The Christmas Album
- The Power of Now by Eckhart Tolle
- Together Book and CD Collection
- Jay Strongwater Picture Frames
- O, The Oprah Magazine subscription
- High-Tech Discoveries
- Four-in-One Camera
- Samsung mobile phone/camera
- Talking Photo Album
- Wafer-Thin CD System

=== 2003 ===
The 2003 episode had 350 people in its audience. The items featured in this episode included:

- Frontgate's Portable DVD Player
- Ralph Lauren Black Label Cashmere Slim Fit Crewneck Sweater
- Melted Chocolate Cake Batter
- Greenberg Smoked Turkeys
- Barefoot Dreams Robes, Adult throws
- Cliff and Buster Macaroons
- The Gingerbread Man by Philosophy
- Pure Simplicity Pumpkin Purifying Mask
- Davies Gates Allspice Cinnamon Powder Sugar Soak
- O, The Oprah Magazine
- MAC Cosmetic Carrying Case
- Nike Dri-FIT Workout Outfit
- FoodSaver Vac 800 by Tilia, Inc.
- Cambio Jeans
- BlackBerry Wireless E-mail Device
- Frederic Fekkai Crème Luxeuse, Apple Cider Clean
- Shampoo & Conditioner
- UGG Classic Short Boots
- Judith Ripka Two Necklace
- Philip Stein Teslar Watch
- Sony DCR-DVD200 Handycam
- The Neiman Marcus Cookbook

=== 2004 ===
The audience for the 2004 episode consisted of teachers. Items included on the list were:

- Quilted Jacket and Cashmere Scarf by Burberry
- Dell 30" Wide-Screen LCD TV
- Bourjois Lip Products
- Eileen Fisher Waffle-Weave Merino Stretch Zip Cardigan and Pants
- Maytag Neptune Top-Load Washer and Drying Center
- Lollia Lifestyle Collection
- Hand-Blown Crystal Champagne Glasses by Deborah Ehrlich
- Dooney & Bourke Leather Duffle Bag
- Miraval Resort and Spa – Life in Balance
- Orbitz
- Apple Bottom Jeans by Nelly
- Museum Automatic Arte Watch by Movado
- Gourmet Florida Key Lime Bundt Cake by We Take The Cake
- VIETRI Water Garden Tea Service
- SpecialTeas Fine Tea Gift Certificate
- Williams Sonoma Home Bedding
- The Magellan RoadMate 700
- Dell Pocket DJ
- OfficeMax Gift Certificate
- Sony VAIO S260 Notebook computer
- BeBe Winans' A Christmas Prayer CD & Starbucks Gift Card

=== 2005 ===
In 2005, the audience for the taping of the Oprah's Favorite Things episode consisted of volunteers from Hurricane Katrina. The listed items were:

- Philip Stein Teslar Diamond Watch
- Burberry Coat
- Burberry Purse
- UGG Australia's Uptown Boot
- Tin of CaramelCrisp and CheeseCorn from Garrett Popcorn Shops
- The Apple iPod
- "The Oprah Sweater" by Ralph Lauren
- Pure Color Cords
- Lovely by Sarah Jessica Parker
- BlackBerry 7105T from T-Mobile
- Brownies from Moveable Feast Geneva
- Nike Free 5.0 iD
- Kashwere Shawl Collar Robe
- Croissants from Williams-Sonoma
- Hope in a Jar from Philosophy
- "Grace" Basket from Philosophy
- Oatmeal Cookie Dough from Fox & Obel Market
- The Oprah Winfrey Show 20th Anniversary Collection DVD
- Sony VAIO FJ Notebook

=== 2006 ===
In 2006, the Oprah's Favorite Things episode took on a different slant as the audience members each received a credit card valued at one thousand dollars. Each audience member also received a camcorder and was given instructions to use the money to do something kind for someone else while using the camcorder to videotape the good deed.

=== 2007 ===
The Favorite Things show aired November 20, 2007. It returned to the original format in previous years. The 2007 episode was filmed in Macon, Georgia in the Macon City Auditorium on November 17, 2007. "The Oprah Winfrey Show" has been national since 1986, Macon has been its number one market. At any time, 45 percent of the households in Macon, Georgia, at four o'clock, watching Oprah Winfrey.

- Samsung HD Camcorder (SC-HMX10C)
- UGG Australia Classic Crochet Boots
- ToyWatch Crystal Watches
- Perfect Endings Cupcakes by Williams-Sonoma
- Melamine Bowls by Williams-Sonoma
- KitchenAid Artisan Mixer
- Planet Earth DVD Set by The Discovery Channel
- Kai Body Butter & Buffer
- Clarisonic Skin Cleansing System
- Claus Porto Soaps from Lafco New York
- "The Pillars of the Earth" by Ken Follett
- Breville Ikon Panini Press by Williams-Sonoma
- Ciao Bella Sorbetto
- Rachel Pally Swing Turtleneck and Sailor Pants
- Scrabble Premier Edition from Hasbro
- United Artists 90th Anniversary Prestige DVD Collection
- Shaklee Get Clean
- O's Guide to Life
- Josh Groban's Noël CD
- LG HDTV Refrigerator

=== 2008 ===
Winfrey, in addition to the regular show, held an "Oprah's Favorite Things for Summer" episode in May 2008, apparently against her wishes and at the behest of the production staff.

The usual show aired November 26, 2008, one day before Thanksgiving; however, it did not follow the usual format of lavish gifts. Instead, owing to the nation's economic difficulties (Winfrey said that she could not in good conscience give away lavish gifts in such a time of economic trouble), this year's episode would be entitled "How to Have the Thriftiest Holiday Ever!" (described as Oprah's Favorite Things... with a twist!) All the giveaways cost "next to nothing" and emphasized do-it-yourself craftsmanship. Because of the personal nature of many of these gifts, this was the first year that audience members did not receive many of the actual gifts, though they did receive the book and the album.

Gift ideas, many of which were submitted by viewers, included:

- Gratitude boxes, filled with notes of gratitude from various people
- "Oprah's Holiday Hits" compilation album (given away for free on the show Web site)
- Treasure boxes filled with mementos
- Hot chocolate cones
- Regifts (a.k.a. "swap parties"), exchanging unwanted used items of your own for others' used items you would be more likely to use
- Gift baskets that include fruits and vegetables from your own garden
- Time with a loved one
- The Story of Edgar Sawtelle, a book by David Wroblewski

For additional gift ideas, viewers were directed to "The O List" in the December 2008 edition of O, The Oprah Magazine. The list consisted of items that cost under $100.

=== 2009 ===
The Huffington Post broke a story in November 2009 that, for the first time in several years, there would be no Oprah's Favorite Things episode. This turned out to be true; no reason was explicitly given for the cancellation, though the recession that had been taking place the year prior and that had served as the impetus for the low-budget Favorite Things that year was still ongoing at the time. However, Oprah held a sweepstakes in December 2009 that gave away prizes from past Favorite Things collections. The sweepstakes winner was announced and posted on the Oprah website.

=== 2010 ===
Oprah Winfrey's biggest Favorite Things show to date, entitled Ultimate Favorite Things, aired on Friday, November 19, 2010. A second edition aired the following Monday, November 22. It was the final Favorite Things in its original format. The 2010 Favorite Things was the only time Winfrey held a Favorite Things promotion over two episodes in any season of the show. Several of the Favorite Things were products that had been given away in previous Favorite Things episodes.

The list of products given away in the "Ultimate Favorite Things" included:

- A Course in Weight Loss: 21 Spiritual Lessons for Surrendering Your Weight Forever, a book by Marianne Williamson, published by Hay House
- Baker's Edge lasagna and brownie trays with Ghiradelli brownie mix
- Beecher's "World's Best" macaroni and cheese
- Breville panini press from Williams-Sonoma
- Decoded, a book by Jay-Z
- Elfa Customizable Closet System from The Container Store
- Hair care products from Andre Walker, Oprah's hairstylist
- Judith Ripka Eclipse Earrings
- $100 gift card for Kiva
- Kyocera Advanced Ceramic knife 2 piece knife giftset
- Lafco House and Home Collection Candle Set
- Limited edition "25th Anniversary" Oprah watch by Philip Stein
- Ralph Lauren Cashmere Sweater & Cashmere Blanket
- Lululemon Relaxed Fit Pants
- A five-year membership to Netflix
- Four pairs of Nike running shoes
- Nikon D3100 digital camera
- 7-day cruise on the Allure of the Seas from Royal Caribbean International
- Round-trip flight on United Airlines to and from the cruise
- A "25th Anniversary" Oprah shirt
- Sony Bravia 52-inch 3D television and blu-ray player
- The Beginning, an album from The Black Eyed Peas
- Tory Burch "Silver Anniversary" tote bag and flat shoes

The second day's Favorite Things list included:

- iPad, with Scrabble app
- UGG Australia sparkle boots
- A Coach satchel
- Magaschoni tunic and leggings
- Hope in a Jar moisturizer by Philosophy
- Nordstrom lingerie and $500 Nordstrom gift card
- Prepara Herb Saver Prepara
- Chicken pot pie from Centerville Pie Company
- "Oprah's Favorite Things" tin from Garrett Popcorn Shops
- Le Creuset cookware
- Miraclesuit blue jeans
- A jewelry box from Pottery Barn
- Jessica Leigh Diamond earrings from Dana Rebecca Designs
- A gift card for DonorsChoose.org
- Mini croissants from Williams-Sonoma
- Talbott Teas holiday assortment
- The Book of Awakening, a book by Mark Nepo
- Illuminations, an album from Josh Groban
- Let It Be Me: Mathis in Nashville, an album from Johnny Mathis
- A 2012 Volkswagen Beetle, due for delivery May 2011

=== 2012 ===
A two-hour special called "Oprah's Favorite Things 2012" aired on Oprah Winfrey Network on November 18, 2012. It features an audience of 30 deserving people receiving items totaled at over $10,000.

=== 2017 ===
On the November 21, 2017 episode of Rachael Ray, host Rachael Ray presented a list of Oprah's Favorite Things for 2017, with Gayle King serving as Winfrey's representative (Winfrey did not appear, and only one audience member, chosen via a drawing, actually received all 102 items on the list).

Among the items on the 2017 Favorite Things list:

- Pudus Classics red lumberjack plaid slipper socks
- Amazon Echo Show
- Sonicare DiamondClean Smart electric toothbrush, with accompanying smartphone app
- Breville panini press
- English muffins from The Model Bakery
- The Greatest Showman: Original Motion Picture Soundtrack

=== 2019 ===
Among the entries in the 2019 Favorite Things list was the Orolay Amazon Coat, which went viral in part because of its inclusion.

== Satire ==
The website The A.V. Club made fun of the uselessness and blandness of Oprah's 2007 list by posting a feature called 'Oprah's Favorite Thing or Symptom of Clinical Depression?" The 2008 decision to use inexpensive gifts drew jokes from Jimmy Kimmel Live!, including a mash-up that featured Winfrey supposedly giving away thumb tacks, to a much-dismayed audience.

Further criticism and satire have been directed at the reactions from the people in the audience, which typically ranged from cheering and screaming to hysterical crying from men and women alike. A memorable parody of this was featured on a Saturday Night Live skit, where the audience tore the studio apart in their frenzied anticipation of the freebies they would get. Winfrey herself has admitted amusement by some of the audience reactions, having made a certain amount of fun of them in a behind-the-scenes series that aired on Oprah Winfrey Network.

== See also ==
- The Late Late Toy Show, a similarly gift and toy-focused special of The Late Late Show by RTÉ in Ireland
- TV3 Toy Show, a variation of the Toy Show format by RTÉ's rival, TV3
