= Craigville Beach, Barnstable =

Beach in Barnstable County, Massachusetts, United States

Coordinates: 41°38′12.15″N 70°20′24.43″W

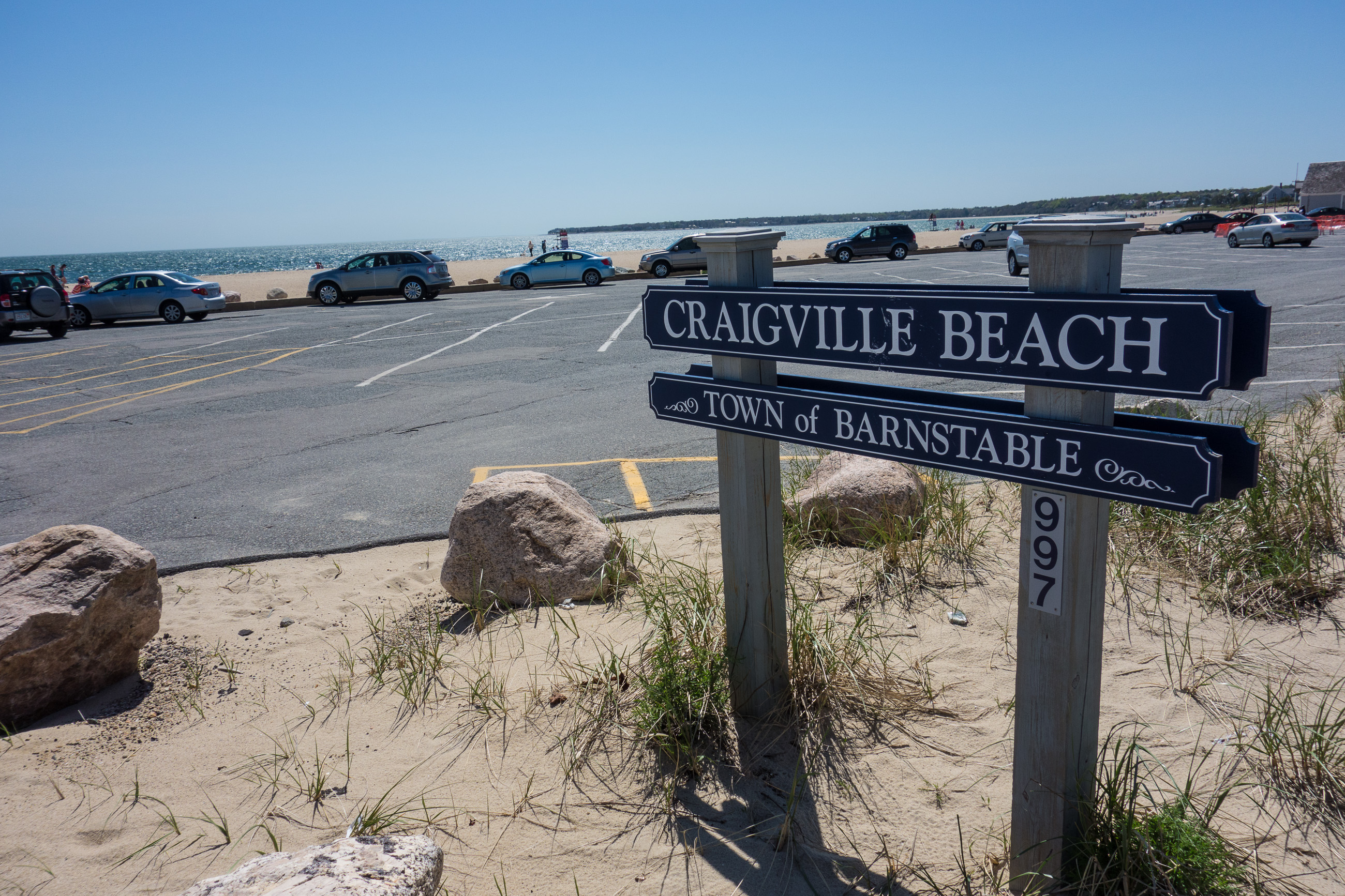
Craigville Beach sign

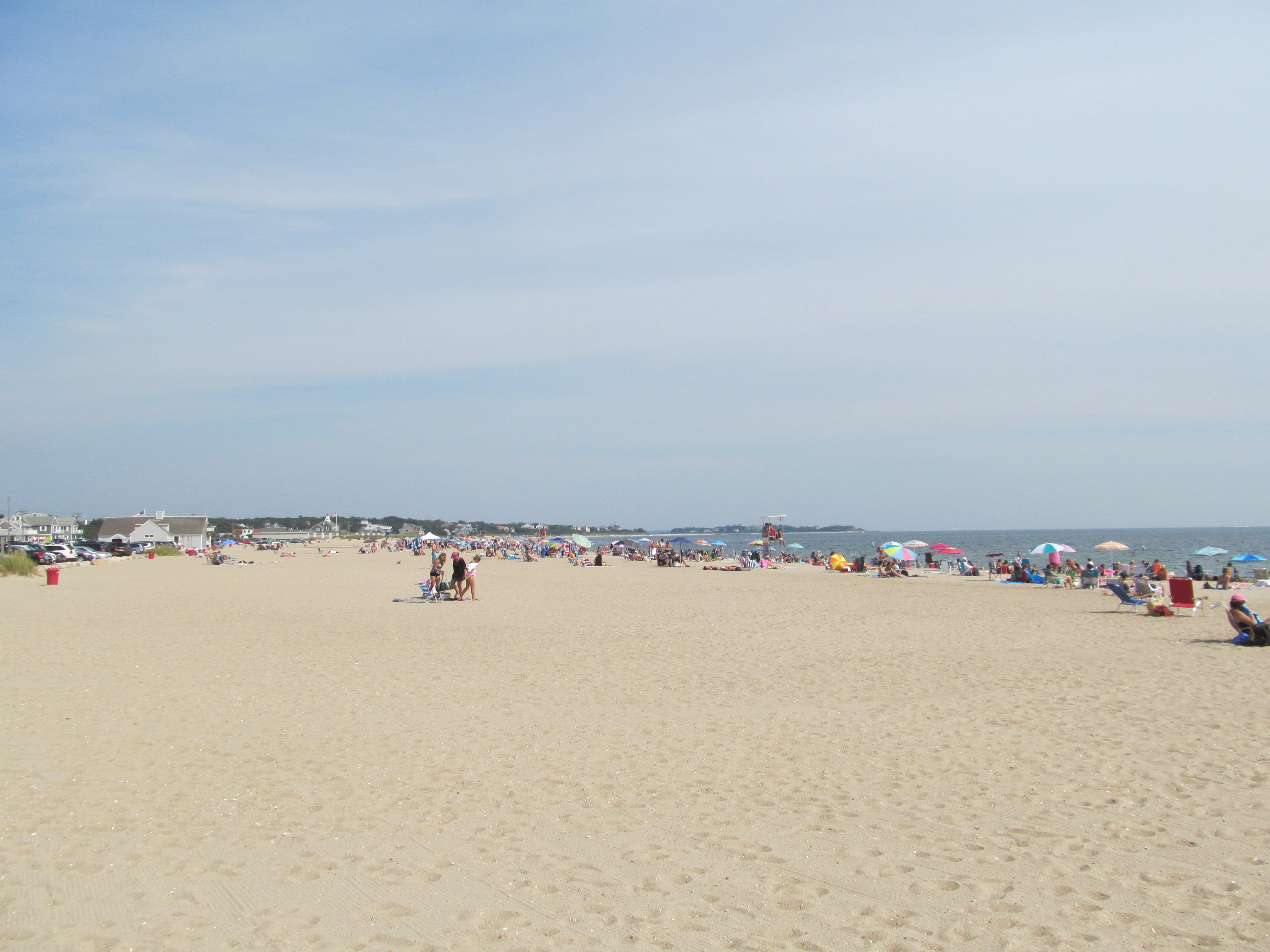
Craigville Beach

Craigville Beach is located on Nantucket Sound.

It is located in Craigville (part of Centerville, Massachusetts) and is a very popular tourist hot spot on Cape Cod. Unlike many private Cape beaches which offer parking to residents only, Craigville is a public beach area, available to non-residents for a daily parking fee. In the summer, kite surfing is extremely popular.

Craigville Beach is geologically contiguous with Covell's Beach to the east. The Covell's Beach parking lot is only open to Barnstable residents during peak times.

The private Craigville Beach Association and The Beach Club flank the main public area. In Massachusetts, public property ends at the low tide line; only certain activities (not including recreational walking and sunbathing) are allowed by right between the low and high tide lines.
