= The Late Late Toy Show =

Irish TV show

- Logo (2009-2012)
- Presented by: Gay Byrne (1975–1998); Pat Kenny (1999–2008); Ryan Tubridy (2009–2022); Patrick Kielty (2023–present)
- Country of origin: Ireland
- Original language: English

Production
- Production locations: RTÉ Studio 4, Donnybrook, Dublin 4, Ireland

Original release
- Network: RTÉ One
- Release: 7 December 1974 – present

Related
- The Late Late Show

The Late Late Toy Show is an annual, special edition of the Irish chat show The Late Late Show. Airing annually on RTÉ One near the end of November or early December to coincide with the holiday shopping season, the Toy Show showcases the popular toys of the year, as presented by the host and demonstrated by various children on-stage, along with appearances by celebrity guests.

Since its first presentation in 1975, the Toy Show has become a cultural institution in Ireland; it is often the most-watched programme of the year on Irish television (and its overall viewership has increased steadily in recent years), and being featured on the Toy Show has been said to have a major boost to sales of a product heading into the Christmas season. Commercial time during the Toy Show is also prestigious for advertisers; in 2009, a 30-second spot cost €17,000; in comparison, a 30-second spot during the 2010 UEFA Champions League Final cost €9,750. Tickets to its taping are also difficult to come by; in one year, a single ticket was auctioned for €1,500.

Most recently presented by Patrick Kielty, the show has previously been presented by Ryan Tubridy, Gay Byrne and Pat Kenny during their tenures as hosts of the Late Late Show. Dustin the Turkey, a high-profile entertainment figure in Ireland, made an annual appearance, usually bringing a gift for the presenter. These gifts when produced tended to have a comedic effect and in the past have included a miniature antique chair and a Pat Kenny clock, ominously presented to Kenny's predecessor Byrne.

== Jumper ==
The Toy Show jumper attracts as much attention as the show itself, with viewers sending in their own versions to RTÉ ahead of the night in the hope that the presenter might wear them. Gay Byrne habitually wore a Christmas jumper each year. He also wore the jumper for People in Need Telethon, but Pat Kenny tended to wear a "naff" grey jumper when he was host. Ryan Tubridy also spoke in favour of the jumper when he took the helm. Byrne was noted for his "Bing Crosby sweater".

Some of the sweaters we got in this year are so bad, the people who knitted them should be put on trial in The Hague for crimes against Christmas.

Ryan Tubridy expressed his distaste for the selection of jumpers he received from fans in 2011.

Audience members also appear in Christmas wear such as hats, antlers and even jumpers.

== History ==
In 1974, Pan Collins a senior researcher and script editor on The Late Late Show pitched the idea of a segment about children's toys to presenter Gay Byrne. Byrne initially turned down the idea but Collins turned to Byrne's assistant Maura Connolly who convinced him to go ahead with it. The first toy segment was to run for a half hour at the end of the programme on 7 December 7, 1974. After the segment achieved high ratings, it was brought back the year after as full special and aired on 13 December 1975. Since then 1976 has been the only year that the Toy Show did not take place as the Late Late team were working on a birthday tribute to Maureen Potter.

In 1994, it was broadcast on 9 December and attracted an audience so high that it did not come close again until the 2010 edition.

In 1997, Dustin presented Gay Byrne with a miniature antique chair during the veteran presenter's penultimate Toy Show. The stunt alluded to a controversy that occurred when the winner of an antiques restoration competition run by the show claimed credit for a chair which had been worked on by another person.

Among the show's other memorable moments over the years are Junior Culchie of the Year Mark McSharry from County Cavan in his mini-motorised toy tractor, the child who said they did not like Justin Bieber "'cus he's so full of himself", Pat Kenny mispronouncing Jerry "Seinfield"'s name before presenting him with his very own cheap Superman toy, and - what is considered "the ultimate Toy Show moment" by many and "possibly the ultimate moment of all time", voted the number 1 moment in an RTÉ Player poll in 2014 -little John Joe Brennan's dissection of the collected works of Roald Dahl—"I find him very poetic" and "for children fantasy always comes first." And his ambition to be a horologist.

== 2000s ==
=== 2002 edition ===
The 2002 edition was broadcast on 29 November 2002. The show's highlights included Pat Kenny making his entrance to the show at the beginning by riding on an elephant named Max. Entertainment was provided by British bands S Club 7 and Busted.

=== 2003 edition ===
The 2003 edition was broadcast on 28 November 2003. Amongst the highlights of the programme included girl group Girls Aloud surprising a young fan who sang a rendition of their song "Jump" while demonstrating a karaoke CD player toy. Amongst other guest appearances included TV presenter Brian Ormond, and his daughter Chloe, the cast of Après Match, who demonstrated toys while portraying broadcasters Gerry Ryan, Marian Finucane, and Joe Duffy respectively, and that year's Eurovision singer Mickey Joe Harte, who performed his follow-up single "There Must be Love". Among the toy testers and performers included Evanna Lynch, who would later go onto star in the Harry Potter film franchise, and dancer Laura Nolan who would later go onto become a professional dancer on Dancing with the Stars

=== 2005 edition ===
The 2005 edition was broadcast on 2 December 2005, attracting 1.1 million viewers as the most watched programme on Irish television that year. It was also the most watched edition of The Late Late Show since Gay Byrne's final show in 1999.

Irish comedian Dave McSavage, appeared in the opening segment of this Toy Show, playing a selfish scrooge.

=== 2006 edition ===
2006 guests
- George Galloway
- Janette Byrne
- Oliver stone

The 2006 edition was broadcast on 1 December 2006. Six-year-old Millie (Philomena) Murray, who, along with her four-year-old brother Gavin Murray, had recently been burned out of her car in Limerick, left her hospital bed to make an appearance. She requested a doll to play with for the show. Her brother was too unwell to feature on the show after the incident that led to over twelve weeks of hospital treatment for the pair. Pat Kenny was later criticised in a study by the Equality Authority for his hosting of the show, in which he persistently reinforced stereotypes of gender roles. An example was a human skull shown to ooze slime, of which the presenter uttered the comment "made for boys, I think".

=== 2007 edition ===
2007 guests

James Blunt

Jerry Seinfeld

Dustin the Turkey

Róisín Seoighe

The 2007 edition was broadcast on 30 November 2007, attracting over one million viewers or seven-tenths of the available audience, making it the most watched television programme in Ireland at that time of 2007. Broadcast over the traditional four parts, it contained a performance from James Blunt, the annual appearance of Dustin, book reviews and Miriam O'Shea who performed a rendition of "Somewhere Over the Rainbow".

Jerry Seinfeld waves to the audience after being presented with his Superman on the 2007 Toy Show. Host Pat Kenny stands to the right clapping his hands together.

The 2007 Toy Show also played host to an interview with comedian Jerry Seinfeld. Kenny expressed a lack of knowledge about his subject from the very beginning when he introduced him as "Jerry Seinfield". There was much uncomfortable chat on the topic of bees (Seinfeld was on the show to promote his new movie, Bee Movie) and Kenny then presented him with a cheap imitation of his favourite superhero, Superman. Seinfeld, who had previously lashed out at Larry King over his ignorance, remained tight-lipped and walked off without informing Kenny of his correct name.

The 2007 Toy Show was opened by the soprano Oisín Nolan who ascended a hanging crescent moon as Kenny entered the studio fresh from his visit to Santa in Lapland. Roisin Seoighe (7) Conemara performed Sean Nos dancing wearing her trademark red dance shoes along with music played by the Castlemahon Buskers. She danced a reel and got a fantastic applause from the audience. The Castle Mahon Buskers came from Newcastle West, County Limerick, and have four members. Two bodhrán players performed, an accordion player and a spoons player. The show was closed by The Young Wexford Singers and Rowe Street Junior Choir.

Thus far, this was Dustin's last appearance on the Toy Show.

=== 2008 edition ===
2008 guests

Nicky Byrne (with Rocco and Jay)

McFly

Duchess of York Sarah Ferguson

Jeremy Clarkson, Richard Hammond, James May

The 2008 edition was broadcast on 28 November 2008 and was Pat Kenny's tenth and final Toy Show. It achieved a total audience of 1,199,000 to become the most viewed television programme across all channels available in Ireland since 2001. It was the fourth consecutive year that the show cleared the one million viewers mark, with 275,000 of those watching being children and almost 800,000 watchers being adults.

The highlight was the opening, which first showed Kenny standing on a railing outside the RTÉ studios in Donnybrook putting an extra light bulb on to the lights. A boy, Anthony Malone from Tullamore, then switched on the lights which went all over the country. Anthony then picked up a present and passed it to the other kids in a pass the parcel like fashion, while a little girl (Lauren Norton) sang a rendition of Mariah Carey's All I Want for Christmas Is You. The show then proceeded to the main studio where kids dressed as elves and Santa's sang the song and passed the parcel to the audience who passed it on to Kenny who was standing at the top of the audience before the piece ended and he welcomed the audience.

Afterwards Dustin's absence from the Toy Show was noted when Kenny opened the parcel and said with a sigh of relief: "Thank goodness it's not Dustin!". It was an Elmo toy.

A young people's show on RTÉ Two called Ice had snuck a teddy bear into the set which was spotted on camera during a performance on the show.

The programme proved controversial, with controversy beginning to generate one week before broadcast, when the current value of tickets was questioned. When a competition winner refused two tickets to the show as her prize at the end of the 21 November edition of The Late Late Show, visibly infuriated presenter Pat Kenny tore them up live on air. Kenny questioned why she had entered the competition if she had not wanted to attend the Toy Show (the tickets were just part of the prize; also on offer was €10,000). In the aftermath, the winner, identified as Barbara Heavey from Cork, explained to a newspaper that she had entered the competition "out of boredom", had "no interest in watching children play with toys for two hours" and had no children of her own. She did not see the actual tearing of the tickets as she had turned off the television "to prevent an echo on the line" and attempted to suggest that they either be raffled or donated to someone else only to be drowned out by Kenny and his audience's vocal disbelief. Despite numerous attempts by RTÉ to have her attend, she said she would be "bored stiff", wasn't interested in toys and, if she had to attend the show, would probably "set off the smoke alarms by chain-smoking in the toilets". Kenny did not let the matter rest however, opening his morning radio show the following Monday with a five-minute chat to his listeners in which he implied that the torn-up tickets were of more value than All Ireland final and Munster v. All Blacks tickets. Within minutes footage was uploaded onto the video hosting website YouTube, with spoofs of the incident also created. and Heavey was congratulated in numerous national newspapers.

Two and a half hours before the 2008 Toy Show got underway Kenny appeared on Aidan Power's The Cafe with alter-ego Oliver Callan. (19:00). Kenny revealed McFly would perform, the only guest he was willing to reveal to Power. Power then mimicked the torn ticket incident by teasing Kenny with two tickets before plucking them from his grasp and tearing them into pieces, after which Kenny engaged in some turkey dialogue with the rest of The Cafe. In an announcement aired before the Nine O'Clock News, Kenny let slip that Jeremy Clarkson, Richard Hammond and James May from Top Gear would appear. During the show, Kenny once again referenced the ticket fiasco when, whilst promoting another competition with a prize of a car and €10,000, he said he would "tear up" the vehicle if the winner refused to take it. Nicky Byrne from Westlife appeared with his twin sons Rocco and Jay and met 10-year-old Shauna Byrne, a fan of his who was battling cystic fibrosis at the time but later died on 30 January 2009. Sarah Ferguson was present for the annual children's book section, where she listened to some of the children speak the Irish language. McFly, in their second Toy Show appearance, performed "Do Ya" from their Radioactive album. The closing act was RTÉ Cór na nÓg, singing "Jingle Bells".

=== 2009 edition ===
2009 guests

Westlife

Jedward

Evanna Lynch

The 2009 edition was broadcast on 27 November 2009 and was Ryan Tubridy's first Toy Show. The presenter suggested prior to the show that there was uncertainty over whether he would wear the jumper traditionally worn each year. He wore a maroon jumper on the night. Tubridy's daughter Ella attended the show. The 2009 theme was The Wizard of Oz, with a yellow brick road being especially constructed for the occasion. The first child Tubridy interviewed was 6 year old Róisín from Wicklow.

Elles Divas, three schoolgirls from County Offaly, performed "Don't Stop Me Now" during the first part of the show. At one point Tubridy was asked to attempt to moonwalk by two children, responding in a joking manner: "You didn't do this in rehearsals, lads".

Jedward, wearing glistening bronze suits on their first appearance on Irish television, caused controversy when John swore live on air after tearing his trousers whilst performing a sequence of acrobatic movements around the set. He used the words, "Oh shit. I ripped my pants". Ten security guards were required to take care of the twins, who rose to fame on UK talent show The X Factor. Thousands of female fans surrounded RTÉ's studios to catch a glimpse of the pair who spent time in the audience live on air. Tubridy was later criticised by their manager Louis Walsh for giving them a "hard time".

The programme attracted an average audience of 1.38 million viewers. The jumper worn by Tubridy on his debut as host of The Late Late Toy Show was later auctioned for victims of the 2010 Haiti earthquake on the radio programme Mooney. The jumper raised €1,050. That year's ad featured Tubridy going into a tailor store run by two children, who offered him different sweaters. Tubridy refused each one until they offered him a jacket which he gladly accepted unaware that the kids had plugged in a neon sign at the back.

== 2010s ==
=== 2010 edition ===
2010 guests

McFly

Joe McElderry

Host Ryan Tubridy caused controversy after suggesting via Twitter that he may not wear the traditional jumper. Tubridy made history when he became the first 'Late Late' host to sing on the show. He performed a song from Willy Wonka & the Chocolate Factory in the opening piece of the show. The 2010 Toy Show attracted an average of 1.4 million viewers, the highest audience in 16 years. Speaking about the show, presenter Tubridy said "At the end of a very difficult week in Ireland, I think the country needed a smile, a laugh and a big hug and I think that's what we did on Friday." The show also attracted 46,500 streams on RTÉ Player, up almost 120% on the figures achieved for the 2009 show. The same commercial used in the previous year's edition returned this time with Ryan accepting a sweater from the two kids (who returned for this commercial). However the kids put on 3D glasses showing a 3D effect that they could see so when Ryan asked why they are wearing them, they substituted it with the fact that they were going to a 3D movie. This edition also marked the debut of the band The Strypes who were aged between 12 and 14 at the time.

=== 2011 edition ===
2011 guests

Olly Murs

Jedward

Following on from the previous year's Willy Wonka and the Chocolate Factory theme, 2011 had a Toy Story theme.

It was broadcast on 2 December 2011. The jumper worn by Ryan Tubridy was donated to the fund for artist Alexandra Trotsenko on Liveline. Tubridy entered the show disguised as pull-string cowboy Woody, alongside Toy Show performer Evan O'Hanlon, who stars in Moone Boy, as Buzz Lightyear.

The Late Late Toy Show was the most watched show in 17 years and of 2011, with the following Enda Kenny's Address to the nation in second place and the Eurovision Song Contest in third place. Tubridy later admitted that he had to apologise to a lady in the audience whom he had hit with a soiled nappy tossed carelessly aside during one of the toy demonstrations. Performer on the Toy Show, Ashley Tubridy, later appeared on The Late Late Show in January 2012, performing a new edition to her song "Friends Forever".

=== 2012 edition ===
2012 guests

Union J

The 2012 edition, with a Shrek theme (though a TV commercial airing all week in advance falsely implied an Indiana Jones theme), was broadcast on 30 November 2012. It was host Ryan Tubridy's fourth Toy Show. As showtime approached there was much talk of "reasonably priced toys" and the host's choice of jumper—"There won't be any penguins or snowmen or figures on the jumper. I would describe this sweater as gruesome, nasty and grotesque, but only from a sartorial point of view." [Tubridy "joke"] There was also a scam involving fake tickets. The children appearing included eight Irish dancers known as Damhsa Juniors and two kids from Naas performing English pop singer's Labrinth's song "Express Yourself", with a group singing "Santa Claus is Coming to Town" as the show finale. Other features to look forward to included a special appearance by The X Factor finalists Union J, Aston and Kayleigh from RTÉ documentary Apartment Kids championing toys for small spaces, a remote-controlled James Bond car and a PlayStation game written by J. K. Rowling. The highlight moment of the show happened when young Alex Meehan on a pedal powered tractor came out before spontaneously speaking Irish to Ryan Tubridy. When Tubridy responded by asking him "any craic" Alex answered "Níl" before pedalling off the stage.

=== 2013 edition ===
2013 guests

Robbie Keane

Bosco

The 2013 edition was broadcast on 29 November 2013. The show was streamed on RTÉ.ie live worldwide, anyone anywhere in the world could watch the show as it was not geo-blocked. 40,000 applications for tickets were received with only around 200 available. The show had a Mary Poppins theme, with Ryan Tubridy opening the show dressed as chimney sweep Bert and then tore off the costume to reveal his Christmas jumper. The 2013 toy show featured a record breaking 237 toys. Over 231 performers and demonstrators took to the stage, with 34 of them performing a special opening number from Mary Poppins. The opening song on the show was Chim Chim Cher-ee and featured Ryan Tubridy dancing. In advance, a week before the show, Tubridy received a letter from a young boy from County Cavan named Fergal Smith, who begged to co-host the show with him. Tubridy at first rejected the letter but that same week, he changed his mind and called him live on air and agreed to let him host. Fergal later appeared on the show wearing a similar jumper and also helped Tubridy to introduce youngsters who demonstrated ride on toys. A rival version of the toy show was shown on TV3 on the same day at the earlier times of 10.00am and 8:00pm called Showpal Christmas Toys, the 30-minute programme was presented by Alan Hughes. Robbie Keane was a guest on the show when he surprised a young fan whilst he was playing a game of FIFA 14. Bosco also made an appearance on the show. Domhnall, the young Irish football fan who met Robbie Keane later appeared on The Late Late Show, a week later where he got the surprise of being a mascot for the team for their international friendly against Serbia in March 2014. The 2013 show was the most-watched programme on RTÉ in 2013 and had the highest number of viewers in 10 years. It was watched by 1,547,000 viewers. A Trailer for the movie Anchorman 2: The Legend Continues, was shown on YouTube featuring the movie's main character, fictional anchorman Ron Burgundy, doing a report about the show.

=== 2014 edition ===
2014 guests

Ed Sheeran Danny O'Donoghue

The 2014 edition was broadcast on 28 November 2014. It was Ryan Tubridy's 6th show. On the 31 October Episode, Tubridy launched a campaign for people across the country to knit him a Christmas jumper to wear on the 2014 Toy Show. He wore four jumpers at different stages during the show. 120,000 people applied for audience tickets for the show with only 200 tickets being made available. For the 2nd year running, TV3 showed a rival version of the toy show. This time called the Christmas Toy Show and shown a week before the actual Toy Show to avoid clashing with it. The show was streamed live worldwide on the RTÉ Player, where anyone anywhere in the world could watch the show as it was not geo-blocked. The show had a Chitty Chitty Bang Bang theme. The show featured a record number of children, 269 performers and toy testers. 200 toys were featured and more than 300 were used for the set design. Ed Sheeran was a surprise guest on the show surprising a young girl who sang his song Lego House on SingStar. Also included was Danny O'Donoghue from The Script. Each part opened with a musical or comedy performance. The 2014 show was RTÉ's highest rated programme of 2014, with average ratings of 1,357,400 viewers. The 2014 Toy Show was the most-watched programme on Irish television this century, with an average of 1.59 million viewers and a peak of 1.8 million.

=== 2015 edition ===
2015 guests

David Walliams Evelyn Cusack

The 2015 edition was broadcast on 27 November 2015. It was Ryan Tubridy's 7th show, the 40th Toy Show overall and therefore the Toy Show's 40th anniversary. RTÉ had been selling a premium package to advertisers for €57,500 that includes one 30-second spot in the Toy Show, one spot in the Sunday repeat and online adverts also. For the 3rd year running, TV3 showed a rival version of the toy show. The show was presented by Maria Walsh and Brian Ormond. The show was called the TV3 Toy Show and was shown on 20 November, a week before the actual Toy Show to avoid clashing with it. The 2015 Show took inspiration from the classic children's movie, Beauty and the Beast, with Ryan Tubridy dancing and singing on the opening musical performance of the show. A total of 285 children took part in the show with the opening performance alone featuring 82 children. The Toy Show was once again streamed live on the International RTÉ Player free around the world. The show began with Ryan Tubridy singing and dancing to 'Be Our Guest' from Beauty and the Beast. David Walliams and Evelyn Cusack were guest stars during the show. The Toy Show was RTÉ's most watched programme of 2015, with an average of 1.56 million viewers, beating the viewing figures from 2014.

=== 2016 edition ===
2016 guests

Dermot Bannon Jamie Heaslip Rory McIlroy

The 2016 edition was broadcast on 2 December 2016, starting at 9.35pm and finishing just before 12.00am. It was Ryan Tubridy's 8th show, and the 41st Toy Show overall. On 18 November a teaser trailer was released showing Ryan Tubridy lip syncing All I Want For Christmas in an X Factor-style singing contest. A three-part documentary, The Late Late Toy Show Unwrapped, was also shown in the three days leading up to the show from Wednesday 30 November and followed the toy show performers through the auditions and preparations stages for the toy show, this was presented by Nicky Byrne Over 125,000 people applied for tickets for the show. There were 200 seats available for the studio audience and tickets were allocated on a lottery basis. Advertisers paid €32,000 for a 30-second slot during the Show. The Toy Show was streamed live on the International RTÉ Player free around the world. For the 4th year running, TV3 showed a rival version of the toy show. The show was presented by Lucy Kennedy and Dustin the Turkey. The show called the TV3 Toy Show was also shown on 2 December at 8pm and was 30 minutes long. The theme this year was The Jungle Book. 320 children from all over Ireland took part in the show with 72 performing with Ryan Tubridy in the show's opening number. The show started with The Bare Necessities song which included singing and dancing from Ryan Tubridy in a Baloo costume. During the show, Dermot Bannon from Room to Improve surprised an architectural fan, rugby player Jamie Heaslip presented a young fan with his signed Ireland jersey that he wore during the Autumn International win over Australia, and world number 2 ranked golfer Rory McIlroy presented a young golfing fan with signed versions of Rory McIlroy PGA Tour and tickets to the 2017 Irish Open. The Toy Show was RTÉ's most watched programme of 2016, with 1.4 million viewers watching the show from beginning to end, the highest since 2011. For those who tuned in for at least one minute of the show, the figure is more than two million. Four in five people watching television at the time were watching The Late Late Toy Show, with 77% of Irish TV viewers watching the show. The Toy Show was also watched in 102 countries outside of Ireland on the RTÉ Player. The 2016 Toy Show was the most watched programme of 2016 with a total of 1,571,600 viewers.

=== 2017 edition ===
2017 guests

Johnny Coen Pádraic Mannion Gearóid McInerney Conor Cooney David Burke Alisha Weir

The 2017 edition was broadcast on 1 December 2017, starting at 9.35pm and finishing at 12.00am. It was Ryan Tubridy's 9th show, and the 42nd Toy Show overall. Auditions for performers began on 23 October in Cork and continued with visits to Galway and Mullingar . The application process for tickets to the show went online from 23 October with just 204 tickets being available. In the first two days alone, the show had already received 80,000 applications for tickets. On 23 November a trailer was released and was shown for the first time on RTE 1 that evening. The theme for the trailer was based around the story of The Nutcracker. The trailer shows a young girl settling to sleep with a festive snow globe at her bedside, the snow globe comes to life with Ryan Tubridy dressed as the toy soldier from the Nutcracker inside and plays in the snow with the young girl and other young children. The show was streamed live worldwide on the RTÉ Player, where anyone anywhere in the world could watch live as it was not geo-blocked.

The theme was the Disney animated film The Little Mermaid. The opening of the show included Ryan Tubridy dressed as Sebastian, a red crab from the Little Mermaid dancing and singing on the opening musical performance of Under the Sea. And in the same year Alisha Weir also performed "True Colors" from the 2016 animated film Trolls along with Barry Murphy. Guests included five members of the Galway All-Ireland winning hurling team to surprise a young Galway fan. The Toy Show was RTÉ's most watched programme of 2017, with 1.3 million people watching over the weekend. The average live audience of 1.2 million on the night, 72% of the audience watching television at the time. The show was also watched in 109 countries outside of Ireland. The show was the most-watched programme on Irish television in 2017, with an average audience of 1.3 million viewers.

=== 2018 edition ===
2018 guests

Davy Fitzgerald Jake Carter Seán O'Brien Rob Kearney Tadhg Furlong

On 4 October, Ryan Tubridy revealed that the 2018 Late Late Toy Show would take place on 30 November, starting at 9.35pm. It was Ryan Tubridy's 10th show, and the 43rd Toy Show overall. The application process for tickets to the show went online from 26 October with just 204 tickets being available which are issued via a random lottery. There were more than 140,000 applications for the show in 2017. On 19 November a trailer was released and was shown for the first time on RTÉ One that evening after the Six One weather bulletin. The show was streamed live worldwide on the RTÉ Player, where anyone anywhere in the world could watch live as it was not Geo-blocked. The theme for the show was based on the film The Greatest Showman and included 200 young performers and over 30 toy testers. The opening of the show included Ryan Tubridy dressed as P. T. Barnum and performing the song The Greatest Show in a circus ring set. The Toy Show was RTÉ's most watched programme of 2018, with 1.5 million people watching over the weekend. The average live audience of 1.3 million on the night, 74% of the audience watching television at the time. The show was also watched in over 100 countries outside of Ireland.

=== 2019 edition ===
2019 guests

Shane Lowry Katie Taylor

The 2019 edition was broadcast on 29 November 2019, marking the 11th hosted by Tubridy and the 44th edition overall. For the first time, the programme was simulcast with Irish sign language interpretation on RTÉ News Now. Over 90,000 people applied in the first five days for the 150 tickets. An official trailer premiered 20 November, while RTÉ One broadcast a three-night retrospective miniseries, The Late Late Toy Show Unwrapped, from 27 November, which chronicled the special's history and featured reunions of children who appeared on past editions.

The show was themed around the film Frozen, featuring Tubridy dressed as Olaf for the show's opening number. Amongst the performers was Anna Kearney who had represented Ireland in the Junior Eurovision Song Contest 2019 two weeks before the Toy Show. Highlights of the programme included Tubridy surprising a toy tester with an ill brother with a trip to London, and a young bike rider and his family receiving a surprise from his older sister who flew from Australia to surprise her family on the show. Notable guests included golfer Shane Lowry and boxer Katie Taylor. A short tribute to the programme's late original host Gay Byrne, who died earlier in the month, was featured at the end of the programme when Tubridy was sat in an armchair with a photo of Byrne next to him on a coffee table, while a young boy performed a rendition of White Christmas. The Toy Show was RTÉ's most watched programme of 2019, with 1.7 million people watching over the weekend. The average live audience of 1.35 million on the night, 76% of the audience watching television at the time. The show was also watched in over 100 countries outside of Ireland.

== 2020s ==
=== 2020 edition ===
2020 guests

Dermot Kennedy Gary Barlow David Walliams The Edge

The 2020 edition was broadcast on 27 November 2020, marking the 12th hosted by Tubridy and the 45th edition overall. For the second time, the programme was simulcast with Irish sign language interpretation on the RTÉ News channel. Thousands of children from Ireland and across the world applied to appear on the show. Due to the COVID-19 pandemic, there was no studio audience. For the first time ever, RTÉ opened applications for people living abroad as many families couldn't be together for Christmas due to the pandemic. An official trailer premiered 13 November, which told the story of a young girl named Eva who was stuck at home and missing her friends.

The show was themed around the children's book author Roald Dahl, featuring Tubridy dressed as Fantastic Mr Fox for the show's opening number. Highlights of the programme included singer-songwriter Dermot Kennedy surprising a teenager, Michael Moloney, while performing a cover of Kennedy's "Giants", which he dedicated to his late father, and a special performance of Take That's "Rule the World", sung by Eva Norton, which featured children from all over the world, including Australia, New York City, Bahrain, South Korea, Dubai, Boston, Madrid, Auckland and Tasmania. Notable guests included singer-songwriter Gary Barlow, musician and songwriter The Edge and comedian and writer David Walliams. The Toy Show was the most watched TV programme on record, with 1.7 million people watching over the weekend. The average live audience of 1.5 million on the night, 79% of the audience watching television at the time. The show was also watched in 138 countries outside of Ireland. The Toy Show was the most watched programme on Irish television in 2020.

=== 2021 edition ===
2021 guests

Kellie Harrington Ed Sheeran

The 2021 edition was broadcast on 26 November 2021, marking the 13th hosted by Tubridy and the 46th edition overall. For the third time, the programme was simulcast with Irish sign language interpretation on the RTÉ News channel. Due to health and safety reasons, only people fully vaccinated against COVID-19 were allowed to attend the show. An official trailer for the show premiered on 13 November.

The show was themed around Disney's The Lion King, featuring Tubridy dressed as Timon for the show's opening number. Highlights of the programme included an inspirational eight-year-old boy Finn who spoke about battling cancer, and a special performance by the Kieran brothers – DJ Callum and his younger brother Jackson with dancers mixing modern dancing with traditional Irish. Notable guests included singer-songwriter Ed Sheeran who made his Toy Show return to sing with the "Toy Show Choir", and Olympic gold-medalist Kellie Harrington who shared motivating advice to young children around the country. The Toy Show was RTÉ's most watched programme of 2021, with 1.8 million people watching over the weekend, making it one of the highest-rating TV programmes on a single channel on record in Ireland. The average live audience of 1.56 million on the night, 81% of the audience watching television at the time. The show was also watched in 152 countries outside of Ireland, including from all fifty states in the United States and all eight Australian territories. It was the most watched programme on Irish television in 2021.

=== 2022 edition ===
On 13 May 2022, The Late Late Show announced details of a Christmas musical for the first time, with Toy Show The Musical coming to the Convention Centre Dublin from 10 December.

2022 guests

Caoimhín Kelleher Emma Watson (pre-recorded message) Katie McCabe Leanne Kiernan Louise Quinn

The 2022 edition was broadcast on 25 November 2022, marking the 14th and final edition hosted by Tubridy and the 47th edition overall. For the fourth time, the programme was simulcast with Irish sign language interpretation on the RTÉ News channel. An official trailer for the show premiered on 14 November. The show raised over €3.8 million for its annual charity appeal.

The show was themed around The Wizard of Oz, for the second time after the 2009 edition, with more than 200 young performers and toy testers taking part. The opening number featured Tubridy driving a Dublin Bus down Yellow Brick Road, breaking into a retelling of Dorothy's arrival, not at a land called Oz, but at the Toy Show. There was also a pre-recorded mid-show performance by Tubridy of Let It Snow. Notable guests included Liverpool and Republic of Ireland goalkeeper Caoimhín Kelleher, Harry Potter actress Emma Watson (in a recorded video message), and some members of the Republic of Ireland women's national football team. Highlights of the show included Kelleher surprising a fan with a trip to Anfield, the women's team surprising a fan with a trip to Australia for their upcoming World Cup campaign, a young girl being reunited with her friends from hospital, and the friendship between an Irish girl and Ukrainian girl. The Toy Show was RTÉ's most watched programme of 2022, with 1.6 million people watching over the weekend. The show also had 303,000 streams on RTÉ Player across the weekend, with viewers watching from over 139 countries.

The show was marred by a previously unidentified audience member, who on the night of the event became colloquially known as "The 'Woo-Woo' Man" on social media, owing to the a series of highly audible 'woo' noises during periods of audience engagement.

=== 2023 edition ===
2023 guests

Alisha Weir Peter O'Mahony Bundee Aki

The 2023 edition was broadcast on 24 November 2023, marking the first edition hosted by Patrick Kielty following Tubridy's departure from the show and the 48th edition overall. For the fifth time, the programme was simulcast with Irish sign language interpretation on the RTÉ News channel. The first television advert for the show aired on the night of 17 November and showed a classroom of kids teaching Kielty what he needs to do to fulfil their Toy-Show wishes.

The show was themed around the Christmas movie Elf. Amongst the special guests were Alisha Weir, in her second Toy Show appearance following 2017, from Matilda the Musical, who surprised a group of fans who performed the number "Naughty" from the musical, and Ireland rugby players Peter O'Mahony and Bundee Aki, who surprised a young fan with a signed Ireland jersey. Highlights of the programme included Kielty surprising an audience member with her daughter and her family who flew in from Australia, and Kielty surprising a young fan who was watching from hospital at the time with the opportunity to be picked up to the studio to appear on the show. At the beginning of the programme, Kielty also paid tribute to the young kids who were subjected to an attack in Dublin the previous afternoon. €3.6 million was raised for the Toy Show Appeal.

The Toy Show was RTÉ's most watched programme of 2023, with 1.7 million people watching over the weekend. The show also had 550,000 streams on RTÉ Player across the weekend, with viewers watching from over 147 countries. On social media, #LateLateToyShow generated 26.2 million video views and 2.2 million interactions.

=== 2024 edition ===
2024 guests

Mariah Carey (pre-recorded message) Jazzy Norah Patten Johnny Sexton Phil Healy Sharlene Mawdsley

The 2024 edition was broadcast on 6 December 2024, marking the second edition hosted by Kielty and the 49th edition overall. It was the first Toy Show to be in December since 2017. For the sixth time, the programme was simulcast with Irish sign language interpretation on the RTÉ News channel.

The show was themed around the Christmas movie Home Alone and the Home Alone house. There were over 100,000 applications for 220 studio audience seats, and 250 children took part in the show as performers and toy testers. Amongst the special guests were Jazzy, who surprised a young fan from Tallaght, aeronautical engineer Dr Norah Patten, who surprised two aspiring astronauts, and retired Ireland rugby player Johnny Sexton, who surprised a young fan with a pair of boots. Highlights of the programme included Kielty surprising two best friends with a trip to Universal Orlando for them and their families, Olympians Phil Healy and Sharlene Mawdsley surprising a young fan with a Smyths trolly dash to collect toys for Crumlin Hospital and Mariah Carey surprising a young fan with a personal pre-recorded video message to conclude the show. For the first time, a Toy Show County Parade took place with 32 children from every county taking to the studio floor to show their pride for their county. Kielty also paid tribute to Saoirse Ruane, a young girl who died from cancer earlier in the year and who had been on the show in 2020.

The Toy Show was RTÉ's most watched programme of 2024, with 1.6 million people watching over the weekend.

The show also had 622,000 streams on RTÉ Player across the weekend, with viewers watching from over 139 countries, including streams from all 50 states in America and all eight Australian territories. On social media, #LateLateToyShow generated 18.4 million video views and 1.4 million interactions.

=== 2025 edition ===
2025 guests

Roy Keane Kingfishr CMAT Lewis Capaldi (pre-recorded message) Shane Lowry (pre-recorded message) Conor Bradley (pre-recorded message)

The 2025 edition was broadcast on 5 December 2025, marking the third edition hosted by Kielty and the 50th edition overall and therefore it was the Toy Show's 50th anniversary. For the seventh time, the programme was simulcast with Irish sign language interpretation on the RTÉ News channel, as well as audio description for the first time. On 14 November, a 60-second official trailer for the show was released. It was themed around host Patrick Kielty and a team of toy show astronauts preparing to launch the toy show into orbit. The show was available to view from anywhere around the world on the RTÉ Player.

The show was themed around the Christmas movie The Grinch with the opening of the show narrated by Liam Neeson. Amongst the special guests were Irish band Kingfishr, who surprised young singers and musicians with a performance of their hit song "Killeagh" and singer CMAT, who surprised the Virgin Mary Girls' School choir with an appearance on set after travelling from her 3Arena gig. Highlights of the programme included two best friends being surprised by a pre-recorded video message from singer Lewis Capaldi, who invited them as VIP guests to his 2026 Irish show, then being surprised by Roy Keane in studio afterwards, a young fan being surprised by a video message of encouragement from golfer Shane Lowry and an invitation to the Irish Open, and a Liverpool fan being surprised by player Conor Bradley, with an invitation to attend Anfield for a VIP experience and a match. For the second time, a Toy Show County Parade took place with 32 children from every county taking to the studio floor to show their pride for their county. The 2025 edition of the show also famously tried to be "cool with the kids," by having Kielty say 67 and dress as a Labubu.

The Toy Show was RTÉ's most watched programme of 2025, with an average television audience of 1.7 million people watching over the weekend. The show had 642,000 streams from 137 countries on the RTÉ Player.

=== 2026 edition ===
The 2026 edition will broadcast on 4 December 2026, marking the fourth edition hosted by Kielty and the 51th edition overall.

== Traditions ==
Aside from the host's Christmas jumper, the Toy Show has a number of (mostly unwritten) traditions, including:

- Since 2009, when Ryan Tubridy became the host, the Toy Show has the theme of a children's movie and features songs from the movie performed by several kids (and Tubridy himself) as an opening number dressed as characters from the movie. After this, the host tears off his costume to reveal his Christmas jumper.
- Performances from the Billie Barry Kids
- Dustin the Turkey making an appearance, and invariably insulting the host (Dustin has not been in the Toy Show since 2007, since Ryan Tubridy only became the host in 2009 and left in 2023, this means that no Toy Show hosted by Tubridy had Dustin, the incumbent host Patrick Kielty has not yet featured Dustin on the Toy Show)
- The host soaking members of the audience with a water pistol
- At the end of explaining certain products, the host may announce "there's one for everybody in the audience!" — provided by various sponsors (this also happens in the regular Late Late Show). The number and value of these gifts has become more substantial in recent years. As of 2023, the sponsor must pay €10,000 and provide 240 gifts valued at €150 or more each, and the host reads a promotional script they provide for up to 30 seconds.
- Toddlers are invited to come into the studio earlier in the day and play with the toys; this is recorded and edited before extracts are played back in the show itself
- Reviews and demonstrations of products by older children
- A section where children review a selection of books for all ages.
- The host wearing Christmas jumpers during the show.
- As of 2016, the performers perform a finale music number to close the show.
- The Toy Show is repeated on RTÉ One, the Saturday afternoon after the original airing, previously it was shown on the Sunday.

== See also ==
- Oprah's Favorite Things, a similarly gift-focused segment of a U.S. television programme
- TV3 Toy Show, a variation of the Toy Show format by RTÉ's rival, TV3
