= Centerville Pie Company =

American pie company

Coordinates: 41°39′23.6″N 70°20′51.9″W

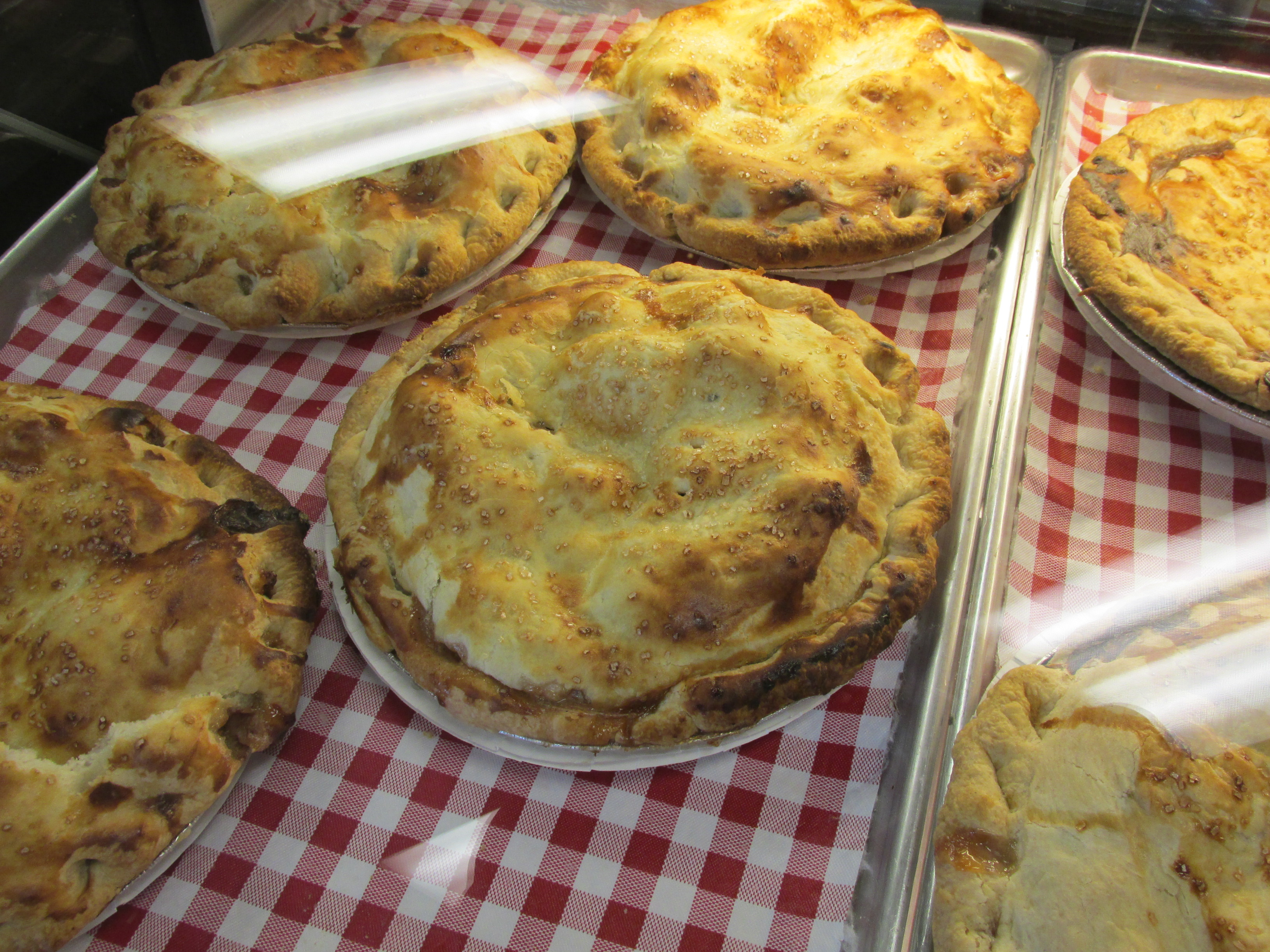
Apple pies at the Centerville Pie Company

The Centerville Pie Company is a pie company located in Centerville, Massachusetts. It gained fame when it was mentioned on Oprah Winfrey's Favorite Things episode in 2010. Centerville pies were at one time sold through the Harry & David corporation, and are currently available via Goldbelly.

== Overview ==
The company was founded by long-time friends and current owners Laurie Bowen and Kristin Broadley in March, 2009. It is located in the village along a shopping plaza alongside Route 28. In 2009, as Oprah Winfrey and friend Gayle King was attending the funeral of Eunice Kennedy Shriver, then Kristin Broadley delivered to them a chicken pie and a peach pie as a gift. Immediately, the two women became fans of the pies and Gayle went and bought two for her children, Kirby and Will.

On September 19, 2010, Kristin and Laurie appeared on The Oprah Winfrey Show. In December, Oprah named them one of her Ultimate Favorite Things. Although the Centerville Pie Shop Restaurant closed in 2018, the pies are currently available at their Pie Shop in Centerville, MA, on their website and via Goldbelly.
