= Amazon coat =

Coat with viral popularity

The 092 coat (aka The Amazon Coat) by Chinese brand Orolay went viral on the internet from the period between December 2018 and the COVID-19 pandemic. It became street fashion.

== History ==
The Amazon Coat was sold by Orolay on Amazon prior to 2016, but had received little popularity or notice. Bloggers posted about it and increased its popularity. By autumn 2017, it was being worn by some "ultra-stylish" women on the Upper East Side and was picked up by fashion journalists, who were intrigued why stylish women were wearing a low-priced coat. In early 2018, The Strategist and The New York Times covered it. Lauren Posner, an Upper East Side resident, started an Instagram account chronicling sightings of the coat as a marketing experiment. It sold more than 10,000 units, making Orolay more profit in early 2019 than the entirety of 2017, and causing them to expect $30 to US$40 million in revenue for 2019.

The coat gained further mainstream popularity when Oprah put it on her list of favorite things of 2019.

== Reception ==
The coat, sold in separate men's and women's versions, was described as "fairly plain" and "not cool", with its initial color being olive green. Its paneling and zippers were noted as being influenced by luxury fashion house Balenciaga, with the coat's appeal lying in its "super different" appearance and low price despite its resemblance to far more expensive clothing. Its sudden prominence was compared to the Moncler and the "black puffy North Face" coat of the 1990s.

Despite its origin as a viral trend, much of its popularity may have been inflated by fashion journalists due to profits from affiliate marketing. The popularity caused the cost of the coat to rise to $140.
