= The Story of Edgar Sawtelle =

2008 book by David Wroblewski

- First edition cover bearing "Oprah's Book Club" sticker
- Author: David Wroblewski
- Language: English
- Publisher: HarperCollins/Ecco
- Publication date: 2008
- Publication place: United States
- Media type: Print (hardcover)
- ISBN: 978-0-06-137422-7
- OCLC: 179805747
- Dewey Decimal: 813/.6 22
- LC Class: PS3623.R63 S76 2008

The Story of Edgar Sawtelle is the first novel by American author David Wroblewski. It became a New York Times Best Seller on June 29, 2008, and Oprah Winfrey chose it for her book club on September 19, 2008. Winfrey also included the book as one of the few tangible gifts in her recession-themed thrifty Oprah's Favorite Things that year. The same year, it was a finalist for the Art Seidenbaum Award for First Fiction.

The novel is a retelling of William Shakespeare's Hamlet in rural Wisconsin. The title character is a mute boy who, after his father is killed, runs away from but then returns to his usurped home, hoping to prove his suspicions that his uncle murdered his father.

== Plot summary ==
Forte's Children

Edgar comes from a line of dog breeders. After buying a farm, his grandfather, John Sawtelle, rents out the farmland and starts dog breeding. He and his wife have two sons, Edgar's father (Gar) and Claude. Claude leaves the farm and Gar stays on and carries on the family business. After some troubled attempts to have a child, Gar and his wife (Trudy) have Edgar. After his parents come to understand that he is mute, his parents learn sign language along with him, some made up and some real signs. Edgar grows up on the farm learning to breed dogs with his parents and Almondine, his own dog, who is always by his side and in a way speaks for him. Once he is old enough, his parents give him his own litter to raise.

Eventually, Claude returns to the farm. After a brief stint of helping out around the house and barn, he leaves following a drunken brawl with Gar. A few weeks later, Edgar finds his father in the barn, dying mysteriously. After unsuccessfully trying to call for help, Edgar watches his father die.

Three Griefs

After burying Gar, Edgar and Trudy decide to keep the family business running, despite the new workload. However, shortly after beginning to adjust to Gar's death, Trudy catches pneumonia and Edgar attempts to carry on the work without her. With his mother sick, Edgar begins to fall out of the routine. He falls asleep in the barn one evening and wakes to realize it is now night. The dogs had gone so long without their meal that Edgar decides to let all of the dogs loose in the kennel and pours a large pile of kibble in the center for them. Before long, two dogs end up in a vicious fight. With both dogs injured and their vet out of town, they must call on Claude for assistance. After he helps treat the dogs and Trudy recovers, they begin to sleep together.

One night not long after, Edgar wakes to the dogs barking and goes to investigate. Searching around in a storm for what was causing the dogs to bark, he sees the outline of his father's ghost in the rain. Through signs, Edgar is led to the syringe that most likely killed his father – one that he has seen Claude use before.

What Hands Do

After Edgar confirms that his mother and Claude are indeed romantically involved, he struggles to live under the same roof with his uncle. He comes to seek confirmation for his suspicions about his father's murder.

When a potential buyer comes over to take a look at their dogs, Edgar seizes on the opportunity to test Claude. He stages a scene with the dogs, in which they mimic Claude using a syringe to poison people. One dog touches another with a syringe in its mouth and the touched dog falls over and plays dead. The final dog touches Claude's leg, and when Claude flinches and storms off in anger, Edgar feels he has confirmed his suspicions.

Angry at the strange show Edgar put on in front of a buyer, Trudy confronts Edgar and they get in a struggle. In the midst of their argument, Edgar, enraged, seeing a figure he thinks to be Claude, swings a hay hook and sends him tumbling down the stairs, killing him. Trudy discovers that the figure was actually Dr. Papineau, their vet. Scared at what might happen to Edgar because of the death, she tells him to disappear for a while. Three dogs from his litter follow him into the woods.

Chequamegon

Edgar drifts in the woods and, without a fishing tackle, is forced to rob the cabins he comes across for food. Eventually, he decides to head up to Canada, where there is a commune he hopes to join. Along the way however, one of his dogs is injured, and he is forced to seek help.

He goes to a house he has just robbed and the owner, Henry Lamb, helps him with the injured dog. He talks to Henry through writing, and agrees to stay there until his dog has healed. Once the dog is healed, Henry offers to give Edgar a ride up north to his destination. En route they are hit by a tornado. In the aftermath, Edgar decides to return home. He leaves two of his dogs with Henry.

Poison

Edgar visits his father's grave and learns that Almondine has died. He returns home and leaves a note in his house for his mother. Claude finds it before Trudy and tells Glen, a police officer and son of Dr. Papineau, who is suspicious that Edgar caused his father's death. Spooked by Edgar's appearance, Claude moves a bottle of poison in the barn and Edgar catches him. Later, Edgar sees his mother and convinces her to give him a night alone in the barn, so he can search for the poison Claude moved. Meanwhile, Claude and Glen plot to trap Edgar, so Glen can “question” him.

Glen surprises Edgar in the barn and tries to kidnap him using a rag soaked in ether. Edgar manages to grab some quicklime and douses Glen in it. It gets in Glen's eyes and he stumbles out of the barn, blinded. The ether hits a lamp and the barn lights on fire. Edgar, worried for the dog's files, his father's life's work, starts moving them out of the barn while it burns up. Trudy tries to stop him, but she is held captive by the now blinded Glen Papineau. Claude has hidden the poison with the papers, though. He pretends to help Edgar take the files out of the barn, grabs the bottle of poison, and when he is not looking, stabs Edgar with a syringe in the burning barn. As Claude waits for the poison to work on Edgar, Claude tries to get out of the burning barn but sees his brother's figure in the smoke. All of a sudden, the barn fills with smoke, as if Gar is not letting Claude escape. Claude ends up not being able to get out, and he and Edgar die in the barn. The Sawtelle dogs, who have escaped the fire, leave into the wild.

== Film ==
In 2012, writer Wentworth Miller acquired the rights of the novel for a feature film for producers Tom Hanks and Oprah Winfrey.
