= Centerville, Massachusetts =

Village in Massachusetts, United States

- Village
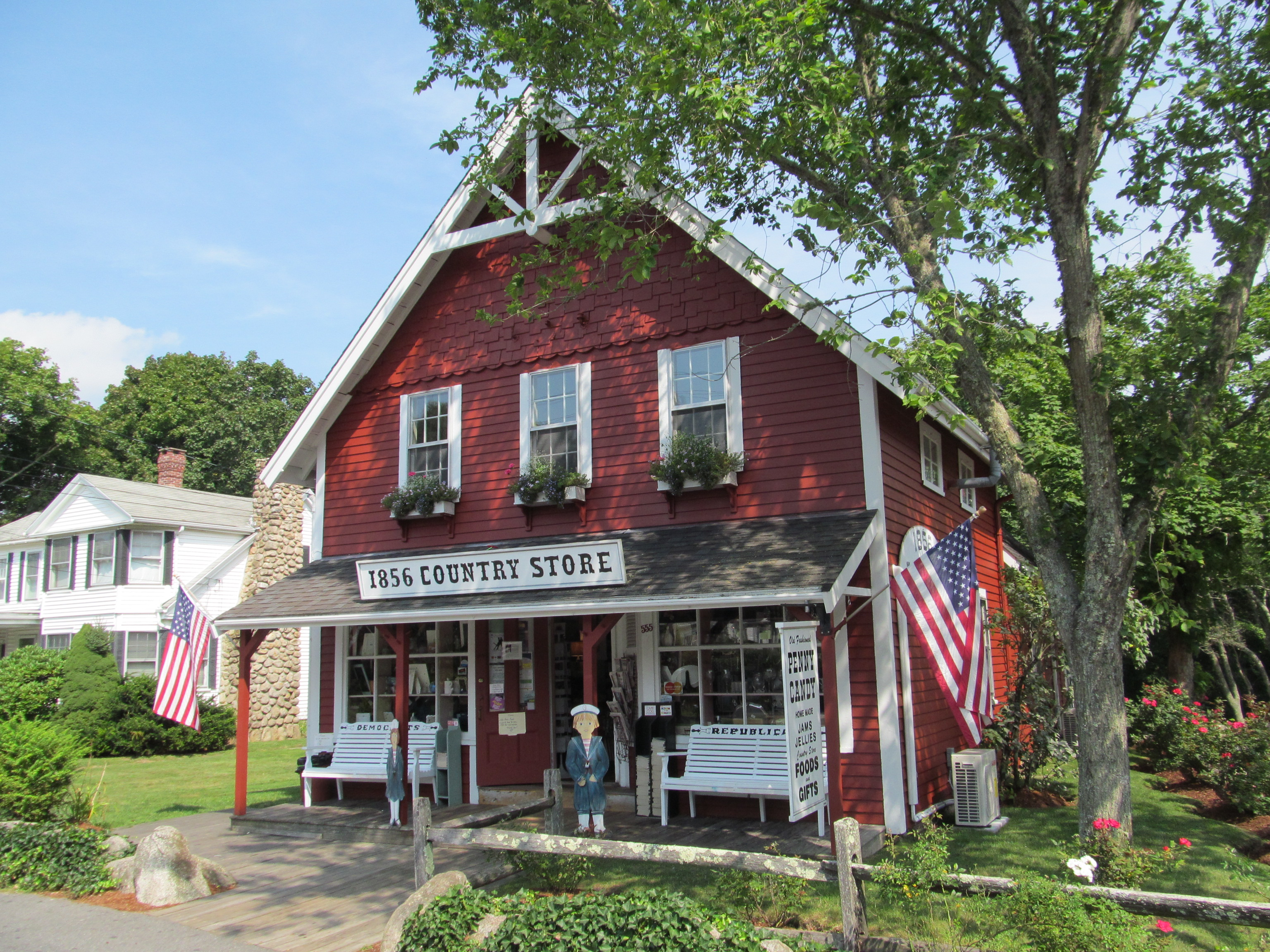
- 1856 Country Store

- Location of ZIP code 02632 Centerville within the Town of Barnstable, county, and state
- Coordinates: 41°38′45.2″N 70°20′48.1″W
- Country: United States
- State: Massachusetts
- County: Barnstable County
- Municipality: Barnstable

Area
  - Total: 8.8 sq mi (23 km^{2})
  - Land: 7.3 sq mi (19 km^{2})
  - Water: 1.5 sq mi (3.9 km^{2})

Population
  - Total: 10,742
  - Density: 1,471.507/sq mi (568.152/km^{2})

Centerville is one of the seven villages in the Town of Barnstable, Massachusetts, United States, on Cape Cod. Located on the South Side of Barnstable, Centerville is primarily residential, and includes a small business district as well as several notable beaches. It has its own elementary school and public library, and is home to the Centerville Historic District and the Centerville Historical Museum.

Centerville contains the neighborhood of Craigville, which includes Craigville Beach. Centerville was originally named Chequaquet (meaning "pleasant harbor"). Centerville is the location of the award-winning, independent Four Seas Ice Cream shop on South Main Street near the intersection with Old Stage Road. It is also home to the Centerville Pie Company, mentioned on The Oprah Winfrey Show's 2010 "Oprah's Favorite Things" episode. Located on Pine Street is the St. Francis Xavier cemetery, which is the final resting place for Eunice Kennedy Shriver and her husband Sargent Shriver. In late June 1993, Jaleel White, who portrayed Steve Urkel on the sitcom Family Matters, performed in a one-man production of Fiddler on the Roof in front of the Centerville Public Library. The American composer Amy Beach frequently summered in Centerville during the 1920s and 1930s.
