= Craigville, Massachusetts =

Coordinates: 41°38′22″N 70°20′06″W

- Village
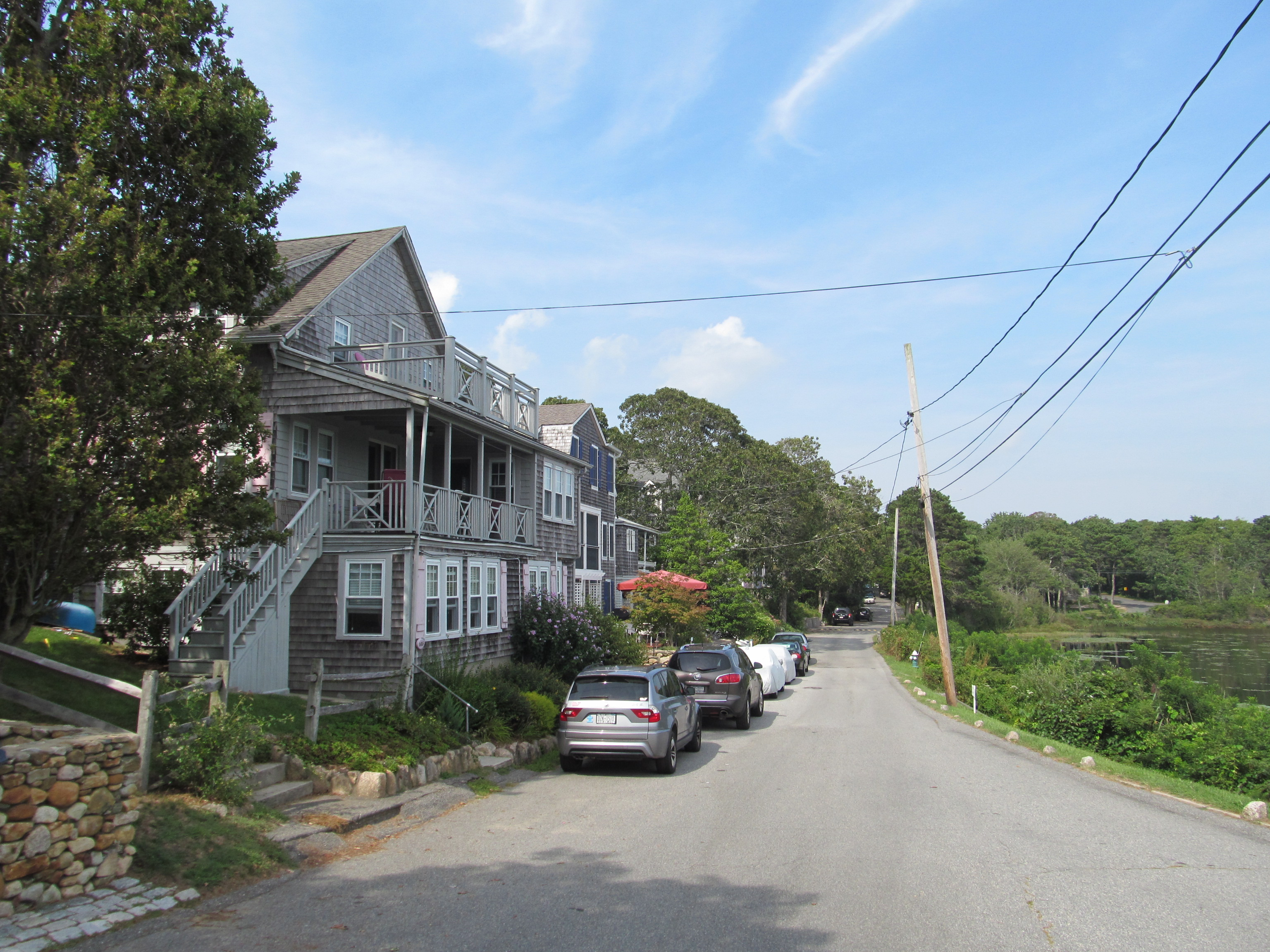
- Lake Elizabeth Drive
- Interactive map of Craigville, Massachusetts
- Country: United States
- State: Massachusetts
- County: Barnstable
- Town: Barnstable
- Time zone: UTC-5 (EST)
  - Summer (DST): UTC-4 (EDT)
- Area code: 508
- FIPS code: 25-75820
- GNIS feature ID: 0615693

Craigville is a part of the village of Centerville in Barnstable, Massachusetts, United States. Craigville consists of the Craigville Beach area.

== Geography ==
Craigville Beach is a popular tourist attraction in Craigville.

== Demographics ==
Craigville is located in the Barnstable village of Centerville.
