= Four Seas Ice Cream =

Ice cream shop in Centerville, Massachusetts

Coordinates: 41°38′40.23″N 70°20′45.98″W

- Genre: Dessert
- Founded: 1934; 92 years ago
- Headquarters: Centerville, Massachusetts, United States
- Area served: Cape Cod
- Key people: Josh and Lesley McElhattan, Douglas and Peggy Warren, Dick Warren
- Products: Ice Cream
- Website: http://fourseasicecream.com/

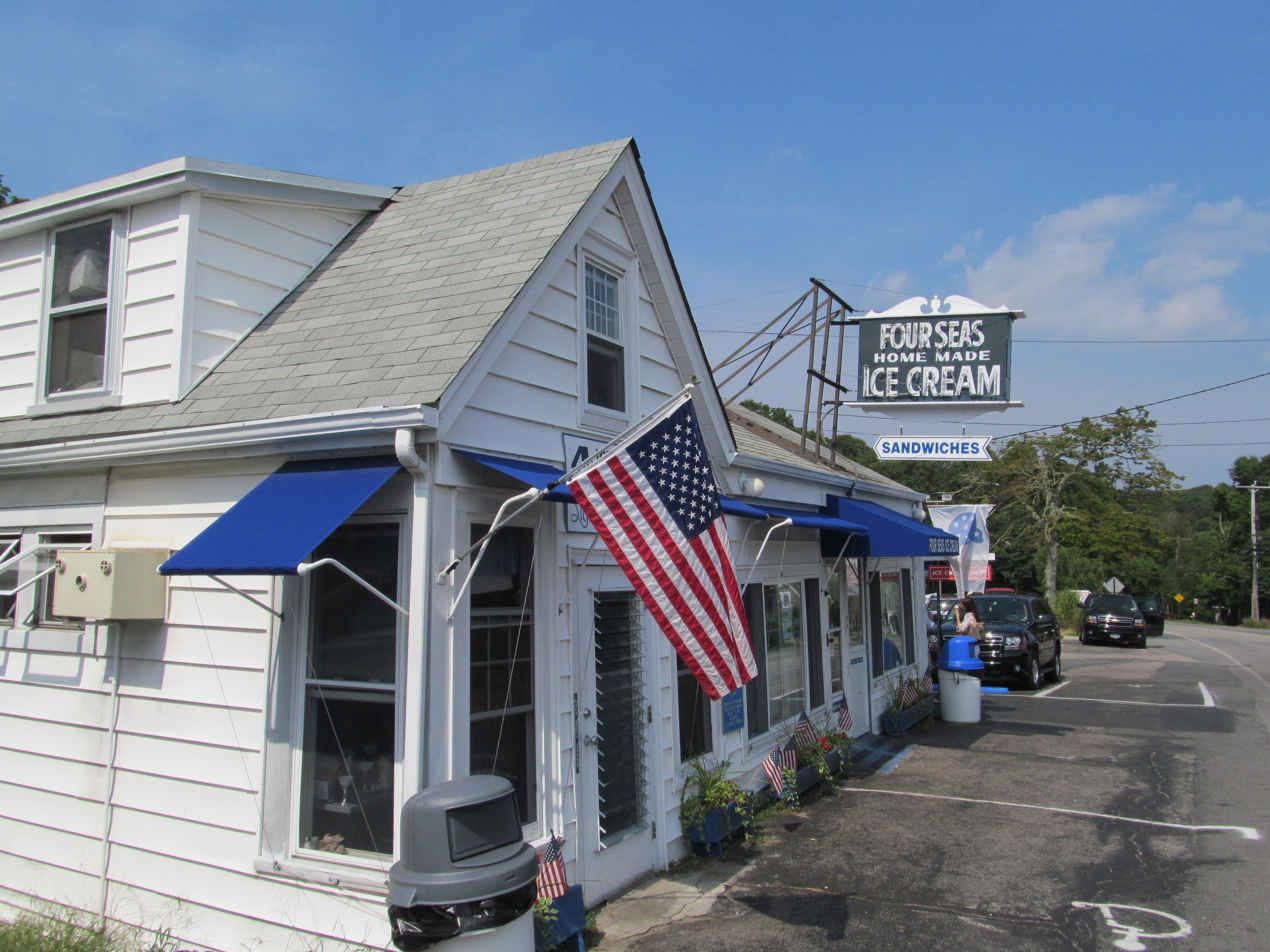
Four Seas Ice Cream

Four Seas Ice Cream is an independent ice cream shop located in Centerville, Massachusetts. It is one of the three oldest ice cream shops in New England. It has been the winner of many awards and citations over the years as the result of its flavors. In the past, it has been voted number seven on the list of Top 10 Ice Cream Parlors in the United States.

== History ==
The shop was founded in 1934 by a W. Wells Watson. The store was named from part of a poem by "Mable E. Phinney" - 'Cape Cod Calls'; '"We face four seas," our slogan runs Four seas of azure blue...' The 4 seas refers to the 4 bodies of water surrounding the Cape: the Atlantic Ocean, Buzzards Bay, Cape Cod Bay, and Nantucket Sound. In 1960, the shop was purchased by Dick Warren and during this time the parlor was frequented by the Kennedy Family. The store was operated by Warren until 2001 when he sold it to his son and daughter-in-law - Douglas and Peggy Warren. Dick Warren—also known as "Chief" by his employees—continued to help out at the store until his death in 2008. He wrote the book "The Complete Idiot's Guide to Home Made Ice Cream." The shop has stayed in the same location over the past 86 years, and has even kept the same diner feel setup that it originated with. Over the years, the shop has garnered many national awards from many reputable organizations. In 2011, Food and Drink Magazine named the company number sixteen in their top 25 ice cream stories.

== Awards ==
- Cape Cod Life - Winner of Best Ice Cream Mid Cape
- Boston Magazine - Best Ice Cream
- Channel 7 News - New England's Best
- USA Today Top Ten Ice Cream Places
- Phantom Gourmet Approved
- New England's Best
- Food & Wine's Best Ice Cream Spots in the U.S.
- The Real Paper Awards - Best Ice Cream
- Yankee Travel New England Editors Pick
