= David Wroblewski =

American novelist (born 1959)

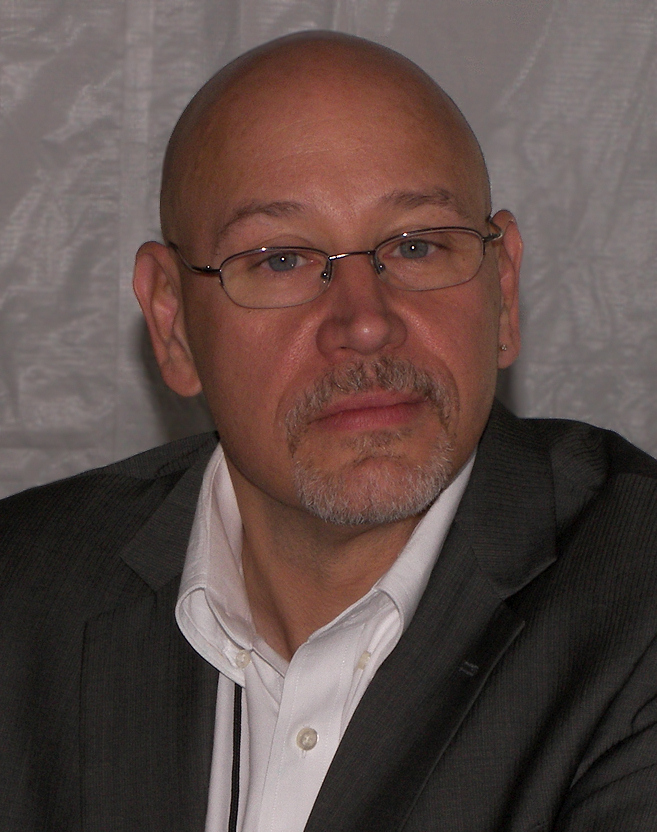
- David Wroblewski at the 2009 Texas Book Festival.
- Born: David Wroblewski; 1959 (age 66–67); Oconomowoc, Wisconsin, U.S.
- Education: Warren Wilson College (MFA)
- Occupations: Novelist, software researcher and developer
- Spouse: Kimberly McClintock
- Writing career
- Period: 2008–present

David Wroblewski (born 1959) is an American novelist whose first novel was The Story of Edgar Sawtelle.

== Early life ==
David Wroblewski was born in Oconomowoc, Wisconsin, near Milwaukee. He earned his master's degree from the Warren Wilson College MFA Program for Writers. As a child and through high school, he had a dog named Prince that was the basis for the dog in his novel.

== Career ==
David Wroblewski started his career in the software industry before becoming a writer.

== Personal life ==
David Wroblewski is married to writer Kimberly McClintock.
