= Norah Patten =

Irish aeronautical engineer

Norah Patten is an Irish aeronautical engineer and STEM (Science, Technology, Engineering and Maths) advocate from Ballina, County Mayo. Patten was selected to potentially become the first Irish person in space as part of a mission on board Virgin Galactic's second generation of spacecraft. This mission, known as Delta, is proposed to take place in 2026/2027.

== Early life and education ==
Patten was born in Ballina, County Mayo. She attended St. Mary's Secondary School, and has been fascinated by space since visiting NASA's Glenn Research Centre in Cleveland, Ohio when she was 11 years old. She designed rockets for her junior certificate art project.

She visited NASA on several occasions as a teenager and opted to study aeronautical engineering at the University of Limerick. Patten completed a work placement at Boeing during her undergraduate degree programme and continued her education at the University of Limerick, where she obtained a doctorate in aerodynamics in 2011. She completed a work placement in Bell Labs during this time.

Patten participated European Space Agency supported Alpbach Summer School in 2008 and graduated from the International Space University Space Studies Programme in 2010.

== Career ==
Patten worked as a lecturer and project manager at University of Limerick before joining the Irish Composites Centre as the communications and outreach manager in 2012. She initiated and managed "The Only Way is Up" project, which sent Ireland's first student experiment to the International Space Station in 2014, through a commercial agreement with NanoRacks.

She was awarded an International Astronautical Federation Emerging Space Leaders Grant and was a panellist on the Next Generation Plenary in 2015. Patten has been selected as department and team project chair at the International Space University on a number of occasions and was elected as a member of the voluntary global faculty of the International Space University in 2016. Patten was the first Irish participant at Project PoSSUM and has completed high-g flights, hypoxia training, aviation egress training and spacesuit testing and evaluations.

== Communication and outreach ==
Patten is an advocate for STEM education. She has appeared on several national television shows including Virgin Media One, Ireland AM and several radio programs, including on Today FM. She has given several keynote speeches and worked with Irish companies to promote STEM initiatives. Patten was among Limerick's Top 40 under 40 featured in Image as part of the "Changemakers" series in 2018.

Patten created "Planet Zebunar", a STEM product for children that is she has described as "inclusive, non-gender specific and offer[ing] an immersive experience" using both "offline and online technologies", including augmented reality.
