= TV3 Toy Show =

- Presented by: Alan Hughes (2013) Karen Koster & Brian McFadden (2014) Maria Walsh & Brian Ormond (2015) Lucy Kennedy & Dustin the Turkey (2016)
- Country of origin: Ireland
- Original language: English

Production
- Production locations: TV3 Sony HD Studio, Ballymount, Dublin 24, Ireland

Original release
- Network: TV3
- Release: November 2013 – November 2016

Related
- Ireland AM

TV3 Toy Show was a special one-off programme that aired annually on Ireland's TV3 near the end of November or early-December. The TV3 Toy Show prominently featured the popular toys of the year that were showcased before the oncoming Holiday season by the presenters and demonstrated by various children on-stage, along with appearances by celebrity guests. The show was hosted by different presenters each year, and was a direct competitor to RTÉ One's The Late Late Toy Show. The final episode of the series was broadcast in November 2016.

== Origin ==
In the mid-2000s TV3's morning show, Ireland AM, began an annual Toy Show special the morning of the Late Late Toy Show, which airs on rival channel RTÉ One. It was largely presented by Ireland AM regular Alan Hughes.

== History ==
In 2013 TV3 decided to produce their own prime time version of The Toy Show. The first edition was called The Christmas Toy Show. It was presented by Ireland AM presenter Alan Hughes. Airing from 8pm to 10pm the show clashed with RTÉ's Late Late Toy Show for half an hour. The first edition had 352,000 viewers.

In 2014 TV3 decided to give the presenting role to a different person. Announcing that Xpose regular Karen Koster & former Westlife boy band member Brian McFadden would present the show. This edition was called the Showpal Toy Show, and was used to promote TV3's new Showpal app. The show aired one week before The Late Late Toy Show and had 472,100 viewers. It was presented from the RDS in Dublin.

In 2015 the series returned to TV3 studios. This time it was presented by the Rose of Tralee 2014 Maria Walsh and presenter Brian Ormond. Again, the show aired a week before rival show The Late Late Toy Show. It had just 264,000 viewers.

In 2016 the show was presented by Lucy Kennedy and Dustin the Turkey. It was also shown on 2 December at 8pm, the same day as the Late Late Toy Show.

== See also ==
- The Late Late Toy Show, the annual special edition of The Late Late Show since 1975.
