= Five Seven Live =

Defunct Irish radio programme

Five Seven Live is an Irish radio rolling news programme, produced by RTÉ News and aired each weekday evening on RTÉ Radio 1 between 17:00–19:00 between 1997 and 2006, with the final edition being broadcast on 1 September of that latter year.

== Programme format ==
The programme was usually presented in its later years by Rachael English (Myles Dungan being the original presenter), with Philip Boucher-Hayes and Steve Willis often substituting. Main news bulletins were broadcast on the hour and half-hour, with headline summaries every fifteen minutes. Sports bulletins were broadcast on the half-hour, with a summary on the hour. Frequent traffic updates were provided by the Automobile Association, and weather forecasts by Met Éireann. A business roundup was broadcast also at 18:45. The programme also included Farming News, Sport and Headlines on the half hour.

== History ==
The programme began in 1997, and succeeded a shorter programme, Today at Five, presented initially for two years by Pat Kenny and then by Myles Dungan, as well as an RTÉ News at Six-Thirty. This was followed in 1996 by a short lived format, Daily Record (from 16:30-18:00), before Five Seven Live was launched months later. Dungan continued as the main presenter of Five Seven Live until 2000. It was the most widely listened to drivetime current affairs programme in the Republic of Ireland. The programme competed nationally against The Last Word on Today FM, as well as similar programmes on Independent Local Radio, most prominently The Right Hook on NewsTalk 106.

In May 2006, it was announced that Five Seven Live would end in September 2006, to be replaced by a longer programme, with the working title Drivetime (eventually adopted as the official title of the new programme). Drivetime incorporates three strands, a main news strand presented by Mary Wilson from 17:00-18:30 with a similar format to Five Seven Live, a sports segment (replacing Sportscall) from 18:30-19:00, presented by Des Cahill and a third strand to incorporate music, arts, and popular culture, from 19:00-20:00, presented by Dave Fanning, moving from RTÉ 2fm. The final Five Seven Live aired on 1 September 2006, and the first edition of Drivetime aired on 4 September 2006.

== Other RTÉ News programmes ==
Other RTÉ News programmes on radio include:

- Morning Ireland,
- RTÉ News at One
- Newsbeat (on RTÉ 2fm)
- Saturday View
- This Week
