= Mary Wilson (broadcaster) =

Irish broadcaster and journalist

- Born: 1960 or 1961 (age 64–65); Dublin, Ireland
- Occupations: Journalist, broadcaster
- Notable credit(s): Drivetime; Morning Ireland
- Spouses: Tony O'Donoghue (m. 1994–2005) Hugh Daly (m. 2021)
- Children: 1

Mary Wilson (born 1960/1961) is an Irish broadcaster and journalist. She presented the RTÉ radio programme Morning Ireland on RTÉ Radio 1 from 2020 until her retirement in 2025. She had previously presented Drivetime on RTÉ from 2006 to 2020. In 2006, she was described as "one of Ireland’s leading journalists".

== Career ==
Wilson joined RTÉ in 1990. Originally from Tipperary, she began her career at RTÉ's local radio service in Cork before moving to Dublin. Whilst there she worked across a wide range of areas in the RTÉ Newsroom. Before presenting Drivetime, she was the legal affairs correspondent for RTÉ News and Current Affairs between 1996 and 2002. She won the "ESB National Media Awards Journalist of the Year" in 2000. In 2002, she was promoted to the post of legal affairs editor. She spent 10 years in the job overall before moving on in 2006. She has covered many high-profile court cases. When Wilson grew weary with the nationwide escapades of then Taoiseach Bertie Ahern, prior to the Irish general election in 2002, she described herself as "being left a little short of information".

In 2006, when Rachael English finished up Five Seven Live, Wilson was promoted to presenter of Drivetime. The programme airs Monday to Friday from 16:30 until 19:00. She had 229,000 listeners. Joseph O'Connor's radio diary was commissioned by Wilson on this show each Wednesday. In September 2020 she moved to presenting Morning Ireland, with Sarah McInerney and Cormac Ó Headhra taking over on Drivetime.

Wilson has also appeared on the cover of Village.

== Personal life ==
Wilson was married to RTÉ Sport editor Tony O'Donoghue until 2005. She has a daughter, Aoife, born in 1997. She married West Dublin GP Hugh Daly in March 2021.
