= Fran McNulty =

Irish broadcast journalist

- Born: County Longford, Ireland
- Occupations: Journalist and television presenter
- Employer: RTÉ
- Notable credit(s): RTÉ News; Prime Time; Morning Ireland; This Week; RTÉ News at One

Fran McNulty (born 10 December 1979) is an Irish television presenter with RTÉ, where he has been co-presenter of Prime Time, alongside Miriam O'Callaghan and Sarah McInerney since April 2021.

== Career ==
A native of County Longford, McNulty spent several years working in local radio and print before joining RTÉ.

Since 2005, McNulty has been a regular presenter on television and on radio programmes Morning Ireland, This Week and News at One. He has worked across television, online and radio with RTÉ and often reported from overseas on major international stories. As well as covering Papal funerals and conclaves in Rome, in 2013 he covered the funeral of Nelson Mandela presenting a special edition of Morning Ireland from Johannesburg. McNulty interviewed members of the Mandela family and former South African President Thabo Mbeki during his visits to South Africa.

In 2019, McNulty was appointed Agriculture and Consumer Affairs Correspondent for RTÉ News. In 2020 he won an award for Best Audio Report from the Irish Guild of Agricultural Journalists for a report he broadcast on Morning Ireland.

On 22 March 2021, McNulty was appointed as co-presenter of Prime Time, alongside Miriam O'Callaghan and Sarah McInerney from 6 April.

In 2023, McNulty conducted an investigation into how male calves from the Irish dairy sector were treated. The programme saw McNulty drive throughout Europe following trucks carrying Irish calves to locations in Spain and the Netherlands. The programme won a Royal Television Society Award for Investigative Journalism. It also won an international award from CIRCOM.
