= Philip Boucher-Hayes =

Irish journalist and presenter

- Born: County Kildare, Ireland
- Education: University College Dublin (UCD)
- Occupation: Journalist
- Notable credit(s): RTÉ News; RTÉ Radio 1
- Spouse: Suzanne Campbell

This is an article about an Irish person of note. For the similar-sounding French Canadian ice-hockey player, see Philippe Boucher.

Philip Boucher-Hayes (born 1971) is a journalist at RTÉ. He is a news reporter, television and radio presenter. As a news reporter, RTÉ sent Boucher-Hayes to cover the Kosovo War in 1999, Palestine's second Intifada in 2000, Iran, the 9/11 attacks in New York City and the U.S.'s 2003 invasion of Iraq.

== Early life ==
Boucher-Hayes was born in County Kildare. His father lived in Leeson Street before moving out west. Boucher-Hayes was educated in Newtown School, Waterford, and began his journalism career as a freelance contributor to local newspapers before going on to study History and Politics in University College Dublin (UCD).

== Career ==
=== Early career ===
Boucher-Hayes joined RTÉ in 1993. He began his career by reporting on RTÉ Radio 1's Five Seven Live and RTÉ 2fm's The Gerry Ryan Show before producing The Gay Byrne Show. In 1997 he defected to Today FM precursor Radio Ireland for a midday presenting slot, but rejoined the 5-7 Live reporting team on RTÉ Radio 1 in 1998. He was reported in 2006 as being the new presenter of Five Seven Live.

=== Reporting work ===
Boucher-Hayes reported on the Kosovo War in 1999, Latin America, the Israeli-occupied Palestinian territories and Iran. He worked as RTÉ's reporter for numerous historic events, including stints in Southeast Asia (post Asian tsunami), New York City (for September 11 attacks) and Iraqi Kurdistan (during the American-led invasion which preceded the Iraq War in 2003). In 2006 he broke the Israeli blockade of Lebanon and covered the duration of the July War from Beirut and Tyre. His coverage of the 14-year-old death of Brian Rossiter whilst in the custody of gardaí won him the Media Justice Award in 2005. In 2006's "Peak Oil" he was the man behind the series of features on Ireland's looming energy crisis.

He covered Irish politician Liam Lawlor's release from jail. Other issues addressed include water contamination in Galway.

=== Radio work ===
Boucher-Hayes presented the investigative radio series, Investigation on One on RTÉ Radio 1 each Monday evening. The show was given its own segment on Today with Pat Kenny the morning before broadcast, with Boucher-Hayes presenting the evidence in a style that was compared to a "scene where Hercule Poirot explains the whole thing to an assembly of slow-witted guests in the drawing room".

He has also presented Liveline in the absence of regular presenter Joe Duffy.

On 19 October 2022, it was confirmed that Boucher-Hayes would take up presenting duties on Countrywide on RTÉ Radio 1.

Since 2022, he has presented the RTE podcast Hot Mess, which carries the subtitle "Measuring the gap between Ireland's climate aspirations and climate actions".

=== Television work ===
Boucher-Hayes presented the consumer affairs programme Buyer Beware! in 2008.

His other television presenting roles on RTÉ One include the series What Are You Eating. Documentaries presented include Future Shock: The Last Drop, What's Ireland Eating?, The Du Plantier Case, What Are You Working For?, Head Shops and Hot Air: Ireland’s Climate Crisis (2019).

He appeared on The Panel on 27 November 2008.

== Personal life ==
Boucher-Hayes lives in County Wicklow with his wife Suzanne Campbell. He is an atheist. He is the nephew of fellow RTÉ radio broadcaster Myles Dungan.
