= Michael Dwyer (journalist) =

Irish journalist and film critic

- Born: 2 May 1951; Tralee, County Kerry
- Died: 1 January 2010 (aged 58)
- Occupation: Film critic
- Notable credit(s): Co-founder of Dublin International Film Festival, Sunday Tribune Film Correspondent, Sunday Press Film Correspondent; In Dublin Film Correspondent; The Irish Times Film Correspondent
- Partner: Brian Jennings

Michael Dwyer (2 May 1951 – 1 January 2010) was an Irish journalist and film critic who wrote for The Irish Times for more than 20 years. He was previously in this role for the Sunday Tribune, the Sunday Press and the magazine In Dublin.

Dwyer was central to the foundation of two film festivals in Dublin and served on the board of the Irish Museum of Modern Art until shortly before his death. He appeared often on the country's top radio shows, Morning Ireland and The Marian Finucane Show.

He died after an illness on 1 January 2010.

== Early life and career ==
Dwyer was originally from Saint John's Park in Tralee, County Kerry. His mother, Mary, outlived him. He had two sisters, Anne and Maria. As a young man in the early 1970s he took part in the Tralee Film Society, for which he provided notes to The Kerryman. At this time he was employed by the County Library in Tralee. He began working for In Dublin followed by the Sunday Tribune and the Sunday Press.

Dwyer first travelled to the Cannes Film Festival in 1982 and attended every one until 2009, months before his death. In 1985, Dwyer co-founded the Dublin Film Festival and directed it until the mid-1990s. In 2002, he co-founded the Dublin International Film Festival, of which he was the chairman. In later life he served on the board of the Irish Museum of Modern Art.

In the 1990s, he presented the film show Freeze Frame for public service broadcaster RTÉ. The show resulted from a friendship he had formed with Alan Gilsenan and Martin Mahon of Yellow Asylum Films. He was also known for his appearances on the radio shows, Morning Ireland and The Marian Finucane Show. The editor of The Irish Times Geraldine Kennedy, speaking after Dwyer's death, said he was an "enthusiastic advocate" of both national and international cinema and had once said he was "one of those lucky people in life who was able to pursue his interests and call them work".

He had two cats, Fred and Ginger, to whom he spoke regularly as he admitted in an interview with actress Penélope Cruz after it emerged she did the same.

== Illness and death ==
Dwyer became unwell after a trip to the Cannes Film Festival in May 2009. He took a break from writing for The Irish Times, returning in December 2009 to contribute his first—and what was to be his last ever—piece in six months to weekly entertainment supplement The Ticket. The article was a review of cinema in 2009 and of the 2000s, and in his contribution Dwyer referenced the ill health which had haunted him for much of the previous year and which had prevented him from viewing any cinema releases between June and September.

He died at the age of 58 on 1 January 2010. His partner of 24 years Brian Jennings survives him. Irish Minister for Arts, Sport and Tourism Martin Cullen said Dwyer was "the most singular, significant influence on cinema in Ireland for more than three decades". President of the Labour Party Michael D. Higgins said his work was "incalculable [...] he was an activist in promoting a knowledge and appreciation of film in all its forms". Ireland's former Director of Film Classification at the Irish Film Classification Office John Kelleher said it was "a huge loss for the world of Irish film". Director Neil Jordan also spoke of his awe. There were tributes from Gabriel Byrne, Daniel Day-Lewis, Brendan Gleeson, Jonathan Rhys Meyers, Cillian Murphy and Jim Sheridan. The Irish Times published tribute pieces on his life.

His nephew Jim Lyons (who lives in Tralee) gave him a glowing tribute describing his beloved uncle as "one in a million" and also describing Michael "being a great family man" in the Kerryman newspaper. Michael Dwyer is survived by his partner Brian, mother Mary, sisters Anne Lyons and Maria Barrett, brothers-in-law Jimmy and Timmy, nephews Jim & Nick, niece Fiona, grand-nieces Louise, Rebecca, Grace, Josephine, and Lucy.

A ceremony took place at the Church of the Holy Name in Ranelagh where he lived. The event was attended by notable politicians, journalists, artists, actors, writers and musicians. RTÉ newsreader Aengus Mac Grianna, a colleague of Jennings, read a tribute to Dwyer.

Daniel Day-Lewis gave a very special tribute at the church service to his dear friend of over 20 years, calling for the Jameson international Dublin film festival to be renamed in Michael's honour. Dwyer was cremated after the funeral on 5 January 2010.

== Awards ==
Dwyer's "contribution to French cinema" led to an honour from the French government. He received the Chevalier des Arts et des Lettres in 2006.
