= Sarah McInerney =

Irish journalist and broadcaster (born 1981)

- Born: 4 March 1981 (age 45); Barna, County Galway, Ireland
- Education: Dublin City University
- Occupations: Journalist, television and radio presenter
- Years active: 2003–present
- Employer: RTÉ
- Notable credit(s): Virgin Media Ireland; Newstalk; The Sunday Times; Sunday Tribune
- Children: 2

Sarah McInerney (born 4 March 1981) is an Irish journalist employed by RTÉ, where she has been the co-presenter of Drivetime and Prime Time.

== Early life and education ==
Born to two school teachers, and growing up in Barna, County Galway, McInerney attended Salerno Girls Secondary School in Salthill, Galway. She completed a degree in journalism at Dublin City University in 2003. She has since said that this was by mistake, as she really wanted to learn how to write fiction. Her course included a term at Boston University studying fiction writing, but her lecturer did not recommend a career as a general creative writer but as a playwright or actor.

== Career ==
In the course of completing her journalism degree, McInerney completed a work placement at the Sunday Tribune in 2003, in the second week of which she co-wrote a front-page piece, appearing with her name in the by-line. She has since said that she found that she was well-prepared for the work, and after a few weeks, loved it. She secured employment at the Tribune after graduation, initially on a temporary basis, and later being made permanent, initially to produce a social diary, Sarah in the City, and then also as a news reporter. In August 2008 she took up a post as a political reporter with the Sunday Times, working there for 7 years.

After 15 years in print journalism, McInerney began to be invited to broadcast panel discussions, notably at TV3, and she was headhunted to join Newstalk as co-host of their main weekday "drive time" programme, going freelance. Despite a lack of resources, she won the News Broadcaster of the Year national award but after about a year the programme was abruptly moved to a one-hour weekend slot, and she and her co-host left the station within a few months. This episode was discussed by Fintan O'Toole in a piece by The Irish Times, which accused Newstalk of sexism.

McInerney joined the current affairs unit at TV3 (now Virgin Media One), sometimes substituting for leading presenters such as Vincent Browne, a mentor of hers, on television, and taking on her own current affairs programme on Sundays. She also wrote a book on the disappearances of women in the Wicklow Mountains, and worked on a documentary for the BBC.

McInerney moved to RTÉ Radio One, presenting a daily current affairs show, Today with Sarah McInerney, from May to August 2020, and then moving to co-present the primary programme for the evening commute, Drivetime, from September 2020. In March 2021 it was announced that McInerney would additionally become co-presenter of RTÉ's flagship current affairs programme, Prime Time, along with Fran McNulty, joining veteran Miriam O'Callaghan, and she debuted in this role on 6 April 2021 with a well-rated performance.

In December 2025, it was announced that McInerney would be co-lead on the flagship Morning Ireland programme on RTÉ Radio 1.

== Personal life ==
McInerney is married to Thomas, an actuary, and they have two sons. They live in Sutton, a northern suburb of Dublin.

McInerney was given an Alumni Award by her alma mater, DCU, in 2018. She is a voluntary advisory board member at the Centre for the Talented Youth of Ireland.
