= Kevin Myers =

English-born Irish journalist (born 1947)

- Born: 30 March 1947 (age 79)
- Education: University College Dublin
- Spouse: Rachel Nolan
- Writing career
- Genre: columnist
- Website: kevinmyers.ie

Kevin Myers (born 30 March 1947) is an English-born Irish journalist and writer. He has contributed to the Irish Independent, the Irish edition of The Sunday Times, and The Irish Times's column "An Irishman's Diary".

Myers is known for his controversial views on a number of topics, including single mothers, aid for Africa, the Holocaust and Irish nationalism. In July 2017, The Sunday Times announced that Myers would no longer be writing for them following an article he wrote on the BBC gender pay gap, for which he was accused of antisemitism and misogyny, although the chair of the Jewish Representative Council of Ireland stated, "Branding Kevin Myers as either an antisemite or a Holocaust denier is an absolute distortion of the facts."

== Biography ==
=== Early life ===
Myers was born in Leicester, and grew up in England. His father, an Irish GP, died when Myers was 15 and away at Ratcliffe College, a Catholic boarding school. His father's early death created financial difficulties, though Myers managed to stay at the school with the help of both the school and the Local Education Authority.

Myers moved to Ireland to go to university, and graduated from University College Dublin (UCD) in 1969.

=== Journalism ===
He subsequently worked as a journalist for Irish broadcaster RTÉ, and reported from Northern Ireland during the height of the Troubles. He later worked for three of Ireland's major newspapers, The Irish Times, the Irish Independent, and the Irish edition of The Sunday Times.

In 2000, a collection of his An Irishman's Diary columns was published, with a second volume following in 2007.

=== Other work ===
Myers was presenter of the Challenging Times television quiz show on RTÉ during the 1990s.

In 2001, he published Banks of Green Willow, a novel, which was met with negative reviews. In 2006, he published Watching the Door (ISBN 1-84351-085-5), about his time as a journalist in Northern Ireland during the 1970s. The book received positive reviews in The Times, The Guardian, and the New Statesman, while The Independent published a more mixed review that wondered whether there was "an element of hyperbole" in Myers' account.

Myers was a regular contributor to radio programmes on Newstalk 106, particularly Lunchtime with Eamon Keane and The Right Hook. He regularly appeared on The Last Word on Today FM.

Myers was also a member of the Film Classification Appeals Board (formerly known as the Censorship Board).

== Views ==
=== Irish republicanism ===
Myers has been a fervent critic of physical force Irish republicanism. In 2008, he wrote a column condemning the anniversary commemorations of the 1916 Easter Rising, asking, "What is there to celebrate about the cold-blooded slaughter of innocent people in the streets of Dublin? And who gave the insurgents the right to kill their unarmed fellow Irishmen and women?".

Speaking on Newstalk's Talking History radio show in 2010, Myers said, "The awful thing about Irish freedom, and that's what it is, it was achieved at the cost of the lives of so many Irishmen... Irish independence movements have always been civil wars of one kind or another. You are taking up arms against your brother... It was always against fellow Irishmen. In 1798 or 1848 or 1871 or 1916 or 1919... In all insurrections, they involve consuming the lives of Irishmen. The vast majority of the people killed in the last Troubles in Ireland – up to 4,000 dead – the vast majority were Irish."

=== Unionism and loyalism ===
Myers has described the Larne gun-running by Ulster Volunteers in 1914 as "high treason, done in collaboration with senior figures in the British Army and the Conservative Party."

Myers has also written that it is a "myth" to say, when discussing Irish republicanism and Ulster loyalism, that "one side is as bad as the other... There is no republican equivalent to the Romper Rooms of the UDA, wherein men were routinely beaten to a pulp by loyalist thugs... And then there was Lenny Murphy and his merry gang, the Shankill Butchers, who for years in the mid-1970s abducted, tortured and murdered Catholics – usually by cutting their victims' throats. This culture did not emerge simply as a response to IRA violence. It was there already."

== Controversies ==
=== "Bastards" controversy ===
In 2005, he attracted considerable criticism for his column, "An Irishman's Diary", in which he referred to children of unmarried mothers as "bastards":

How many girls – and we’re largely talking about teenagers here – consciously embark upon a career of mothering bastards because it seems a good way of getting money and accommodation from the State? Ah. You didn’t like the term bastard? No, I didn’t think you would.

— Kevin Myers, An Irishmans's Diary, The Irish Times, 8 February 2005

Former Minister of State Nuala Fennell described the column as "particularly sad." She said the word "bastard" was an example of pejorative language that was totally unacceptable. Myers issued an unconditional apology two days later, "entirely at [his] own initiative". Then Irish Times editor, Geraldine Kennedy, also apologised for having agreed to publish the article.

=== Aid to Africa ===
In July 2008, Myers wrote an article arguing that providing aid to Africa only results in increasing its population, and its problems. This produced strong reactions, with the Immigrant Council of Ireland making an official complaint to the Garda Síochána alleging incitement to hatred.

Hans Zomer of Dóchas, an association of NGOs, and another complainant, took a complaint to the Press Council on the grounds that it breached four of the principles contained in the council's Code of Practice: 1) Accuracy, 3) Fairness and Honesty, 4) Respect for Rights, and 8) Incitement to Hatred. In their case details the Press Council said:

beginning with the headline "Africa is giving nothing to anyone – apart from AIDS", the mode of presentation was marked by rhetorical extravagance and hyperbole which used the failings of some to stigmatise whole societies, employing a level of generalisation that was distorting and seriously insulting to Africans as a whole and that, ... [I]n addition the article resorted, in several instances, to language that was gratuitously offensive and was, in the view of the Press Council, likely to cause grave offence to people throughout sub-Saharan Africa and to the many Africans in particular who are now resident in Ireland. They concluded that the article did breach Principle 8 of the Code of Practice in that it was likely to cause grave offence. It did not, however, find reason to conclude that it was likely to stir-up hatred or that there was any intention to do so. They also concluded that the Council did not have clear grounds on which to make any findings in relation to the complaints under Principles 1, 3 & 4 of the Code.

— Press Council of Ireland Complainants and the Irish Independent

=== Alleged antisemitism and misogyny ===
At the end of July 2017, Myers contributed an article entitled "Sorry, ladies – equal pay has to be earned" to the Irish edition of The Sunday Times about the BBC gender pay gap controversy. He speculated: "Is it because men are more charismatic performers? Because they work harder? Because they are more driven? Possibly a bit of each" and that men might be paid more because they "work harder, get sick less frequently and seldom get pregnant".

Myers further alleged that Claudia Winkleman and Vanessa Feltz are higher paid than other female presenters because they are Jewish. He wrote: "Jews are not generally noted for their insistence on selling their talent for the lowest possible price, which is the most useful measure there is of inveterate, lost-with-all-hands stupidity". The editor of the Irish edition, Frank Fitzgibbon, issued a statement saying in part "This newspaper abhors anti-Semitism and did not intend to cause offence to Jewish people". Martin Ivens, editor of The Sunday Times, said the article should not have been published. Ivens and Fitzgibbon apologised for publishing it. After complaints from readers and the Campaign Against Antisemitism, the article was removed from the website. It was later announced by the newspaper that Myers would not write for The Sunday Times again.

Myers was defended by the chair of the Jewish Representative Council of Ireland, Maurice Cohen, who said that Myers was not antisemitic, but had rather "inadvertently stumbled into an antisemitic trope. ... Branding Kevin Myers as either an antisemite or a Holocaust denier is an absolute distortion of the facts." Myers apologised for this article on radio, saying that "it is over for me professionally as far as I can see", and that "I think they [Jewish people] are the most gifted people who have ever existed on this planet and civilisation owes an enormous debt to them – I am very, very sorry that I should have so offended them."

Vanessa Feltz describe the column as "horrifying racism". She also said "When someone alerted me to it ... I couldn't believe such a thing had been printed. It is absolutely gratuitous, not cleverly done, it’s blatant racism. When you see it like that it's very horrifying".

Media reporting the 2017 controversy drew attention to a 2009 column in the Sunday Independent and Belfast Telegraph opposing laws against Holocaust denial. Despite accepting that "the Nazis planned the extermination of the Jewish people" and that "millions of Jews were murdered", Myers wrote "I'm a holocaust denier" by making hair-splitting objections to statements about the Holocaust: namely that the figure of six million Jews killed was false in that it was approximate, not exact; and that the label "holocaust" was etymologically inaccurate in that, unlike a sacrificial holocaust, most victims were "not burnt in the ovens in Auschwitz" but died by gunshot, overwork, or starvation. The column was subsequently removed from the Sunday Independent and Belfast Telegraph websites. The Observer referred to "Holocaust denier Kevin Myers", later adding a footnote "Kevin Myers says he is not a Holocaust denier. He is not, in the usual sense of that term."

In February 2018, the Broadcasting Authority of Ireland by majority decision upheld an objection to the RTÉ Radio 1 programme Morning Ireland presenter Audrey Carville's description of Myers as a Holocaust denier: "While noting that Mr. Myers had described himself as a 'Holocaust denier' in a typically provocative newspaper article that he had written, it was evident from the article as a whole that his description did not in fact amount to a statement denying the genocide of the Jewish people at the hands of the Nazi regime. Rather, the article was a comment on how language is used and the criminalisation of individuals or groups who engage in Holocaust denial." Myers won a defamation lawsuit against RTÉ in 2019 as a result of Carville's accusation.

== Personal life ==
Myers is married to Rachel Nolan and lives in County Kildare. He is the brother-in-law of TV presenter, producer and UK Big Brother housemate Anna Nolan.

== Bibliography ==
- Kevin Myers: From the Irish Times Column 'An Irishman's Diary' (2000).
- Banks of Green Willow (2001).
- Watching the Door: A Memoir, 1971–1978 (2006).
- More Myers: An Irishman's Diary, 1997–2006 (2007).
- A Single Headstrong Heart (2013).
- Ireland's Great War (2014).
- Burning Heresies: A Memoir of a Life in Conflict, 1979-2020 (2020).
