= Rachael English =

Irish broadcaster and writer

- Born: Lincolnshire, England, United Kingdom
- Education: Dublin City University
- Occupations: Broadcaster, writer
- Notable credit: RTÉ Radio 1
- Spouse: Eamon Quinn

Rachael English (born 1968) is an Irish broadcaster and writer. Known for presenting Five Seven Live for six years, English has also presented other radio shows, such as RTÉ News at One, Today with Pat Kenny, The Marian Finucane Show and The Late Debate as well as a permanent presenter of Morning Ireland and Saturday View.

In 2011, Kim Bielenberg said in the Irish Independent that English would be "a natural replacement for Sean O'Rourke if he ever moved on".

== Early life ==
Rachael English was born in Lincolnshire, where her mother, Ruth, was raised. She grew up in Shannon before going on to study Communication Studies at Dublin City University.

== Broadcasting career ==
English debuted in 1989 as a presenter on a new radio station, Clare FM. She briefly worked for the public relations company owned by RTÉ broadcaster Bill O'Herlihy, then moved to RTÉ 2fm as a newsreader in August 1991. She was brought into the News at One team at Christmas that year, when no other staff were available. From there she stood in for presenters on Morning Ireland, Five Seven Live and Today with Pat Kenny.

In June 2000, she became the presenter of Five Seven Live. In her time on the programme she won the PPI award for her coverage of the September 11 attacks. Her father also featured on the show, providing horse racing Cheltenham tips for her listeners.

After six years in the job, she left the programme in August 2006, and it was replaced by Mary Wilson's Drivetime.

Other work in RTÉ has included election coverage on radio since 2002, the 2004 Summer Olympics, the signing of the Good Friday Agreement and other major news events, including the September 11 attacks.

She presented The Late Debate on RTÉ Radio 1 until 2010, and was a substitute when Marian Finucane was not able to present her weekend radio show, The Marian Finucane Show. In August 2009, it was announced she would present the programme Saturday View, as 25-year presenter Rodney Rice retired. She became a permanent presenter of Morning Ireland in October 2010.

In 2022 she was inducted into the IMRO hall of fame.

On 30 May 2024, English was announced as the new presenter of the RTÉ News at One on RTÉ Radio 1 following the retirement of Bryan Dobson.

== Writing career ==
She signed a two-book deal with Orion in 2012. As at February 2024 she has written seven novels.

== Personal life ==
English is married to financial journalist Eamon Quinn.

In October 2008, she was diagnosed with an overactive thyroid (but escaped a potentially more serious diagnosis relating to the lumps found in both of her breasts shortly after the thyroid trouble began). She is on medication for the thyroid problem, possibly for the rest of her life, and has stated that at some point she plans to treat the lump she still has in her throat.

== Publications ==
- Going Back, Orion, 2013
- Each and Every One, Orion, 2014
- The American Girl, Hachette, 2017
- The Night of the Party, Hachette, 2018
- The Paper Bracelet, Hachette, 2020
- The Letter Home, Hachette, 2022
- Whatever Happened to Birdy Troy?, Hachette, 2024
