= Shane Kenny =

Irish journalist and broadcaster (born 1947)

- Born: Dublin, Ireland
- Education: Trinity College, Dublin
- Occupations: Journalist, radio presenter, government press secretary
- Notable credit(s): Morning Ireland; RTÉ News at One; This Week; Moneymakers

Shane Kenny (born 4 July 1947) is an Irish journalist and broadcaster who worked mainly at RTÉ Radio 1. After gaining a BA from Trinity College Dublin he studied journalism in Newcastle upon Tyne and worked there for the Journal and Chronicle from 1970 to 1973. He was a weekend newscaster on BBC North East radio (1972–3) and later in 1973 he was recruited as a reporter and presenter of 7 Days on RTÉ television (1973–5) before joining RTÉ Radio, where he became a news editor in 1980, in which role he launched and was the first editor of Morning Ireland. He was a longtime news anchor on News at One and This Week, presented RTÉ radio's general election coverage, and also travelled extensively in the Middle East, Europe and the United States to report on international news stories and elections. From 1986 he was the US ABC network's Ireland correspondent. In 1989 he won the top prize "for supreme contribution to Irish journalism" at the National Media Awards. He was press secretary to the 1994–97 Rainbow Coalition government, and to its 1996 Presidency of the Council of the European Union. He returned to RTÉ when the government lost the 1997 election and he chose the less political post of business news editor. In 2003 he left RTÉ to research the role of the Russian Marshal Georgi Zhukov in WWII, and establish his own media business, Leader Productions, and a consultancy, Shane Kenny Media CRO. His radio documentary, Hitler's Nemesis – Georgi Zhukov was broadcast on RTÉ Radio 1 in April 2005 for the 60th anniversary of the end of WWII. He still appeared on RTÉ as an independent broadcaster, including his Celtic Tiger series Moneymakers interviewing business leaders, and fronting the "Entrepreneur of the Year" series which he brought to RTÉ television until he stopped in 2007.RTÉ Guide He became director of public affairs at Dublin City University, and a member of the executive board, 2005–2011 with provision that he could continue his broadcasting and consulting work. He retired early in 2011 because of illness.

In 2016 Kenny made a documentary recounting his experience of chronic pain and other side-effects of benzodiazepine, which he had been prescribed first in 2001, but did not take until 2008, and then only for a short time to treat Ménière's disease. In 2020 he alleged that aluminium sulphate in the water supply at his house on Achill Island had triggered a relapse of his debilitating symptoms. In December 2020 he drew first attention in the US and Ireland and the UK to a new study by the FDA which confirmed that benzodiazepines can cause long-term injury with articles analysing the results in the famous US website Mad in America on 2 December, and The Sunday Times 6 December.

== Books ==
- Kenny, Shane; Keane, Fergal (1987). Irish Politics Now: "This Week" guide to the 25th Dáil. Brandon. ISBN 9780863220951.
- Kenny, Shane (1990). Go Dance on Somebody Else's Grave: The Inside Story of the Haughey Coalition. Kildanore. ISBN 9781872455044.
