= Rossiter =

Rossiter is a surname. Notable people with the surname include:

- Brian Rossiter (died 2002), whose death led to an investigation with the Irish state paying damages to his family
- Clinton Rossiter (1917–1970), American historian, political scientist and author
- Edward Rossiter (1618–1669), English politician and soldier in the Parliamentarian army
- H. Rossiter (fl. 1890s), English football player
- J. B. Rossiter (1890–1950), American politician from Nebraska
- James Rossiter (born 1983), British professional racing driver
- James Patrick Rossiter (1890–1943), American lawyer and politician from Pennsylvania
- Jordan Rossiter (born 1997), English professional footballer
- Keith Rossiter (born 1984), Irish hurling coach
- Kyle Rossiter (born 1980), Canadian ice hockey player
- Leonard Rossiter (1926–1984), British actor
- Margaret W. Rossiter (1944–2025), American historian of science
- Richard Alfred Rossiter (1886–1977), American astronomer, known for the Rossiter–McLaughlin effect
- Ryan Rossiter (born 1989), American basketball player
- Stuart Rossiter (1923–1982), British philatelist
- Thomas Prichard Rossiter (1818–1871), American artist

== See also ==
- Rossiter, Pennsylvania
