= Audrey Carville =

Irish journalist

Audrey Carville (born 9 September 1972) is an Irish journalist. She is one of the presenters of Morning Ireland, a breakfast news programme on RTÉ Radio One. She previously presented the current affairs programme The Late Debate on the same station.

From 2004 to 2009, she presented the BBC World Service radio programme Europe Today. She also presented Newshour on the BBC World Service. The Irish Times described her as having a "mellifluous voice and unflappable air."

Carville is a native of Castleblayney in County Monaghan. Her father was Arthur Carville, who served as a Fine Gael party councillor on Monaghan County Council. Her brother, Gary Carville, also formerly served as a Fine Gael councillor on Monaghan County Council, serving as Chairman of that council from 2007 to 2008.

Previously Carville worked for BBC Radio Ulster in Northern Ireland, and prior to that worked for independent local radio stations such as Highland Radio and Northern Sound.

She was named Radio News Broadcaster of the Year in the Institute of Public Relations/BT Awards in 2004. She also won a Celtic Film and Television Award. She was part of a Sony Award-winning team for current affairs journalism in 2002.

In February 2018, the Broadcasting Authority of Ireland upheld an objection to Carville's description, on the Morning Ireland programme, of journalist Kevin Myers as a Holocaust denier. The broadcaster, RTÉ, also lost a defamation lawsuit by Myers in 2019 as a result of Carville's accusation.

Carville is married to fellow Morning Ireland presenter Gavin Jennings.
