= The Marian Finucane Show =

- Genre: News and current affairs, lifestyle
- Running time: 2 hours
- Country of origin: Ireland
- Language: English
- Home station: RTÉ Radio 1
- Hosted by: Marian Finucane
- Produced by: Anne Farrell
- Recording studio: Donnybrook, Dublin
- Original release: 1999 – 2020
- Website: Official website Original (archived)
- Podcast: Podcast

The Marian Finucane Show was an Irish radio programme, presented by Marian Finucane. It aired Saturday - Sunday at 11:00 to 13:00. According to statistics from 2009, it was then the highest-rating weekend radio show in Ireland. When Finucane was away, Rachael English or Brendan O'Connor presented the programme.

Finucane died on 2 January 2020.

== History ==
The show started in 1999 after the retirement of veteran broadcaster Gay Byrne. She had moved from her Liveline slot which she had had since the late 1970s.

The programme stayed in that early morning slot from 09:00 to 10:00 until 2005. Then the programme was replaced by RTÉ 2fm DJ Ryan Tubridy. His new programme The Tubridy Show, was similar in format keeping old items such as her book club. Her programme was then moved to a weekend slot from 11:00 to 13:00.

In 2001, the political career of Fianna Fáil minister Joe Jacob was damaged when he was unable to explain to Finucane and her listeners what people should do in the event of a nuclear explosion at Sellafield. The show was discontinued when Finucane died suddenly on 2 January 2020.

== Format ==
The show began with Finucane's signature tune. She spoke over the music saying:

Hello there, and a very good-morning to you!

When the tune stopped she previewed the newspapers of that day.

The programme continued on with interviews, human interest stories, consumer and lifestyle news as well as panel discussions on issues of the week. In the second hour, there were typically guests in studio or by telephone link. The show was a public forum for serious issues such as the Commission to Inquire into Child Abuse and Shell to Sea campaign.

At the end of the Sunday programme, entertainment journalists previewed the coming week in television and film. Michael Dwyer was a regular contributor to this slot.

The programme usually ended at around 12:55 and was followed by a weather forecast from Met Éireann.
