= Brian Jennings (journalist) =

Irish radio journalist and newsreader

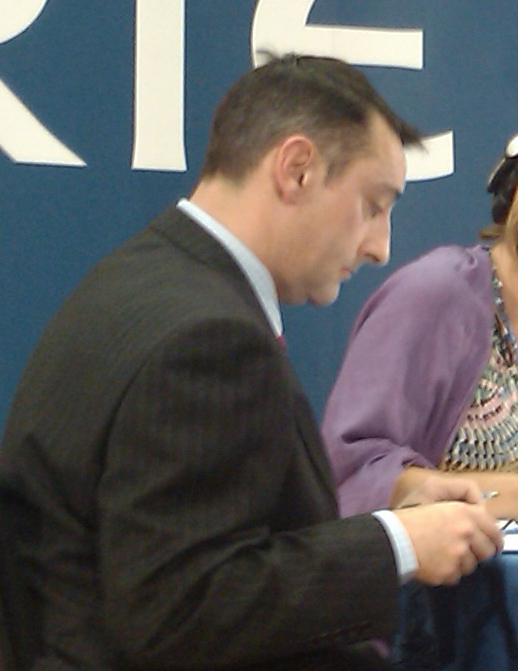
- Jennings in 2009
- Occupations: Journalist, newscaster
- Notable credit(s): RTÉ Radio and News
- Partner: Michael Dwyer

Brian Jennings is an Irish radio journalist and newsreader. He has been employed by RTÉ since 1988.

== Career ==
Jennings began broadcasting on the pirate radio station Q102 in 1985. When the station closed down in 1988, he was part of the final broadcast. When Millennium 88FM opened to celebrated the first millennium in Dublin in 1988, he was a member of the news team.

When the station closed down in 1989 he moved to Millennium 88FM's parent, RTÉ Radio. Jennings worked as journalist and newscaster for RTÉ 2fm. He then moved formally to RTÉ News and Current Affairs. He is currently the morning newscaster on RTÉ Radio 1, beginning at 5:30 am on RTÉ Radio, and on Morning Ireland. Brian was also the associate producer of an RTÉ television film interview show, presented by Michael Dwyer, called Freeze Frame. It had a 3-year run. Former RTÉ Radio 1 broadcaster Gay Byrne praised Jennings' pronunciation. Writing in The Irish Times in 2004 he named Jennings along with three other RTÉ journalists who do not mispronounce words. He was present at the 25th anniversary celebrations for Morning Ireland in November 2009.

== Personal life ==
The Irish Times journalist Michael Dwyer was Jennings' partner for 24 years. Dwyer died in 2010. At the funeral fellow RTÉ journalist Aengus Mac Grianna read out a personal tribute from Brian. The actor Daniel Day-Lewis struggled through snow and ice to get from Co Wicklow to Dublin to speak about his friend Michael at the funeral. He recalled his last telephone conversation with him. He said Michael told me it was the perfect time to talk to him; he was sorting the laundry. Jennings' father Tony Jennings also spoke at the funeral.

After Dwyer's death, Jennings presented an award at the Jameson Dublin International Film Festival in his honour in March 2010. The first "Michael Dwyer Discovery Award" was given to Kate McCullough. The following year in 2011 Brian spoke at the RAAM awards ceremony in London and collected and Industry Achievement Award for Michael Dwyer.
