= Europe Today (radio programme) =

- Genre: News
- Running time: 60 minutes (5:00 pm – 6:00 pm)
- Country of origin: United Kingdom
- Language: English
- Home station: BBC World Service
- Hosted by: Audrey Carville (2004–2009); Paul Henley (2009–2011)
- Original release: 1991 – 25 March 2011
- Website: www.bbc.co.uk/worldservice/programmes/europetoday/index.shtml
- Podcast: www.bbc.co.uk/programmes/p00fh74s

Europe Today is a daily radio news show on the BBC World Service about public affairs throughout Europe, which was broadcast at 17:00 GMT every weekday. The first presenters, in 1991, were Andreas Gebauer and Ruth Hogarth. Other presenters were Teresa Guerreiro, Liliane Landor and James Coomarasamy. The programme was presented by Audrey Carville from 2004 - 2009. The last programme was presented by Paul Henley on 25 March 2011. Originally a 30-minute programme broadcast four times a day to Europe (three morning programmes and one in the evening), it gradually morphed into a one-hour programme broadcast in the evening, broadcast worldwide and with a wider, global focus. The Irish Times described the programme as "an informative and entertaining look at the day’s events on the continent". In 2008, William Horsely called it "perhaps [the] best daily radio programme on European affairs."
