= Myles Dungan =

Irish broadcaster and author

- Born: 1954 (age 71–72)
- Education: University College Dublin
- Occupations: Broadcaster, Author
- Employer: RTÉ
- Known for: Presenting on RTÉ Radio

Myles Dungan is an Irish broadcaster and author. He has presented many arts programmes on RTÉ Radio, and has also been a sports broadcaster on RTÉ Television. Since October 2010 he has been the presenter of "The History Show" on RTÉ Radio One.

Dungan was educated at St Patrick's College, Cavan. He began broadcasting in RTÉ in 1977 as a continuity announcer. He has worked as a reporter for RTÉ Television and RTÉ Radio. He has presented programmes such as Five Seven Live, The Arts Show and Rattlebag on RTÉ Radio 1. He was a regular stand-in presenter on Today with Pat Kenny on RTÉ Radio 1, when Pat Kenny was absent or on holiday. In 1988, he won a Jacob's Award for his radio series, Vietnam.

Dungan also became known to Irish television audiences during the 1980s and 1990s as the regular presenter of RTÉ's televised golf coverage, and as host of an NFL American football highlights show.

In May 2006, Dungan received a Fulbright Scholar Award for academic study in the United States. He undertook a research project at the University of California, Berkeley on Irish-Native American history.

In 2008, he was key-figure in RTÉ's coverage of the 1918 Ireland and The Great War, remembering 90 years since the end of World War I.

Dungan has also written many books, mainly biographies and history. He attends and participates at a number of Summer Schools relating to Irish History, and delivers a course in history at City Colleges in Dublin.

Raised in Kells in the north of County Meath, he attended secondary school at St. Patrick's College in Cavan Town. Raised as a Catholic, he is a convert to the Church of Ireland.

In May 2011, he fronted RTÉ radio coverage of Queen Elizabeth II's visit to Ireland.

He is the maternal uncle of fellow RTÉ radio broadcaster Philip Boucher-Hayes.

== Books ==
- How the Irish won the West
- The Captain and the King
- The Stealing of the Irish Crown Jewels
- Irish Voices from the Great War
- They Shall Grow Not Old: Irish Soldiers and the Great War
- Good Walk Spoiled: Book of Golf Quotes
- Speaking Ill of the Dead (ed.)
- Distant Drums
- Conspiracy *Conspiracy was published in parallel with the broadcast of a radio programme of the same name on RTÉ 1. It was presented by Myles Dungan, and produced by Peter Moooney. Streams of the full radio series are available on the RTÉ Website.
- On This Day New Island Books, 2015
