= Paul Henley =

British radio and television journalist

Paul Henley is a British radio and television journalist. He has worked for the BBC since 1992 and contributes to programmes such as Crossing Continents for BBC Radio 4. He was a runner up in the Foreign Press Association Awards in 2005. He studied languages at Fitzwilliam College, Cambridge. He began presenting Europe Today on the BBC's World Service in early 2009. Currently he frequently presents Weekend on the BBC World Service.

On 4 July 2022 Henley presented The World Tonight on BBC Radio 4.
