= Tony O'Donoghue =

Irish broadcaster

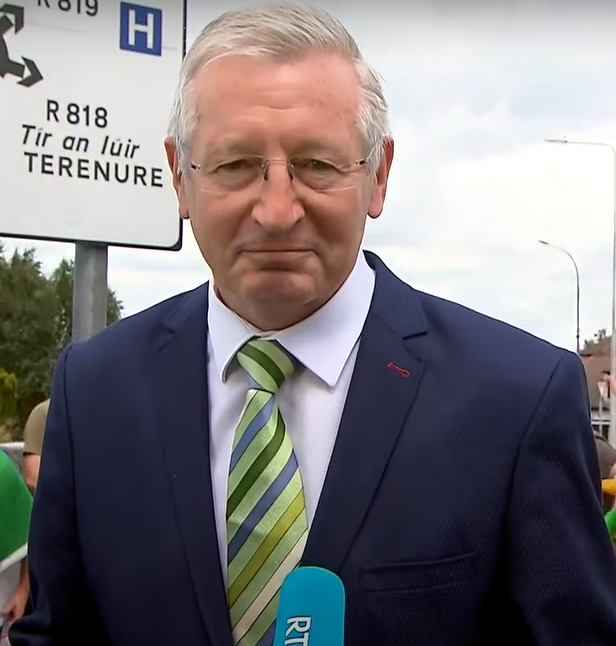
- O'Donoghue in 2020
- Occupations: Broadcaster, journalist
- Employer: Raidió Teilifís Éireann
- Known for: Presenter of Monday Night Soccer
- Spouses: Sarah Symmons (m. 2013) Mary Wilson (m. 1994–2005)
- Children: 2

Tony O'Donoghue is an Irish sports correspondent and Group Soccer Correspondent for RTÉ, Ireland's national radio and television broadcaster. He reports on Republic of Ireland, League of Ireland, UEFA Champions League and English Premier League games, and occasionally presented RTÉ's Monday Night Soccer programme, as well as presenting and reporting on various live games for RTÉ Television.

== Career ==
O'Donoghue became known for his reports on the events in Saipan that saw Ireland captain Roy Keane leave the Republic of Ireland camp before the FIFA World Cup in Japan and Korea. In an interview with Keane, the player with North West England team Manchester United outlined his frustrations with the manager, the Football Association of Ireland (FAI) and the mysterious circumstances surrounding the departure of Stephen Ireland from the Ireland squad during the Steve Staunton era. He has covered all the main stories involving the FAI since the ticket scandals of the mid-nineties.

Before becoming the station's first ever Group Soccer Correspondent he was previously sports news correspondent and later sports editor for RTÉ Television News.

Prior to his move to the RTÉ Newsroom he was a commentator and presenter of RTÉ's main radio sports shows, Saturday Two to Five and Sunday Sport.

O'Donoghue also contributed to the music magazine Hot Press during the 1980s, and acted as manager of Cypress Mine, a rock group from his native Cork.

As a freelance he commentated on many Cork City Football Club games for RTÉ local and national radio, including Cork City v Torpedo Moscow in 1989 and Cork City v Bayern Munich in 1991.

He specialised in Gaelic games, athletics and association football and covered each All-Ireland hurling and football championship since 1987. As a sports commentator his first major broadcast was the Cork County Senior Hurling championship final between Sarsfields and Glen Rovers in 1989, and he went on to commentate on major inter-county championship matches for RTÉ radio including Munster hurling and football games, Connacht finals and one of the four famous Dublin v Meath clashes in 1991. He gave a sideline report on Feargal Logan's ankle injury to television viewers in between Charlie Redmond's first and second sending off during the 1995 All-Ireland Senior Football Championship Final.

He also wrote a regular column for the RTÉ Sport website on football related matters, The Inside Track, the same title used for a Drivetime music and sports radio show he hosted for RTÉ Cork 89FM in the 1990s and a sports column he wrote for the Irish Examiner newspaper for a number of years beginning in 1996.

He covered the Olympic Games in Barcelona (1992), Atlanta (1996), featuring a memorable (and emotional) trackside interview with Sonia O'Sullivan, Sydney (2000) and Athens (2004).

He did not attend the 2014 FIFA World Cup in Brazil but did present the afternoon highlights programme on RTÉ.

O'Donoghue had many heated interviews with Martin O'Neill when he was Ireland manager, especially during the (unsuccessful) 2016–2017 qualifying campaign for the 2018 FIFA World Cup in Russia.

He had a run-in with Qatari police during efforts to film in the country on 17 November, three days before the 2022 FIFA World Cup began.

== Personal life ==
O'Donoghue has supported Tottenham Hotspur since childhood.

While studying history and economics at University College Cork, O'Donoghue edited The Raven.

He married RTÉ's Mary Wilson in 1994 and they have a daughter. The couple split in 2005. O'Donoghue married Sarah Symmons in 2013 who he had met on a flight to Newcastle. They have one son together.

In 2011, he had a lump removed from his neck and underwent radiation and chemotherapy after being diagnosed with cancer. O'Donoghue was worried about his upcoming football commitments but his oncologist Professor John Crown said: "Tony, I want you to be well for the World Cup in Qatar in 2022".
