= Walter Cook (footballer) =

English footballer (1893–1973)

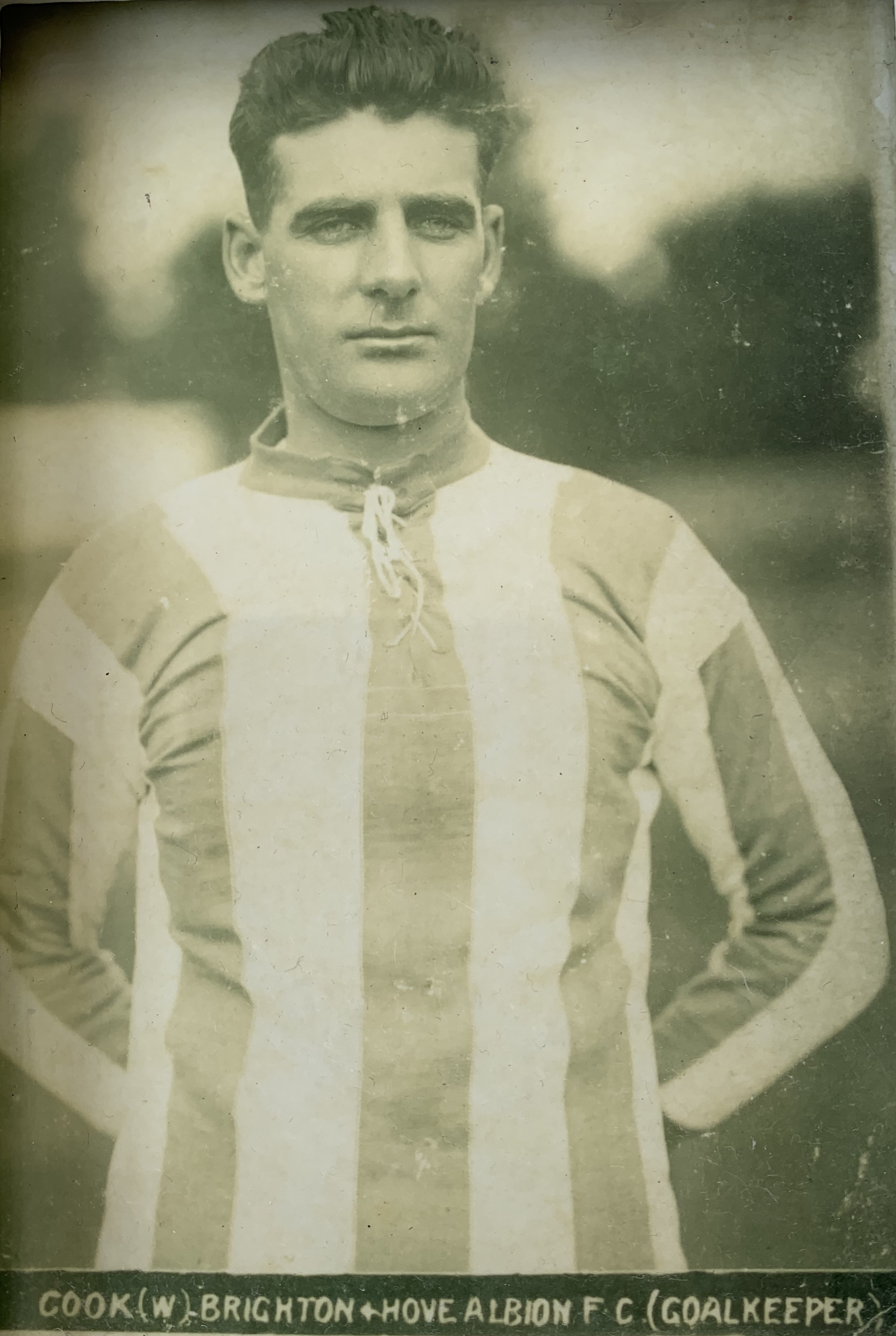

Personal information
- Full name: Walter Charles Cook
- Date of birth: 1 July 1894
- Place of birth: Midsomer Norton, England
- Date of death: 1973 (aged 78–79)
- Place of death: Harrogate, England
- Height: 5 ft 11 in (1.80 m)
- Position: Goalkeeper

Senior career*
Years	Team	Apps	(Gls)
1918–1919	Leeds City		
1919–1920	Castleford Town		
1920–1924	Plymouth Argyle	7	(0)
1924–1926	Brighton & Hove Albion	52	(0)
1926	Darlington	0	(0)
1928–1929	Stockport County	9	(0)
1929–1930	Harrogate	24	(0)
- * Club domestic league appearances and goals

Walter Charles Cook (1 July 1894 – 1973) was an English professional footballer who played as a goalkeeper in the Football League for Plymouth Argyle, Brighton & Hove Albion and Stockport County. He was on the books of Leeds City before the League resumed after the First World War, and played non-league football for Castleford Town and Harrogate.

== Life and career ==
Walter Charles Cook was born to Joseph and Ellen Cook in Midsomer Norton, Somerset, on 1 July 1894. He had blue eyes and brown hair. By 1901, the family had moved to Castleford, in the West Riding of Yorkshire, where Joseph was working as a coal miner. The 1911 Census records the 16-year-old Cook employed as a pony driver underground. He enlisted in the Cameronians in 1915, served in France, and was discharged in 1917 as physically unfit for military service. His discharge papers described him as a "sober, honest and diligent soldier, discharged on account of a wound sustained in action." He married Beatrice Haley in March 1918, and gave his occupation as miner.

Cook played for Leeds City immediately after the First World War, but had left the club for Midland League club Castleford Town of the Midland League before the Football League resumed. Together with Cecil Eastwood and Joe Little, Cook moved on to Plymouth Argyle in May 1920. A backup to the long-serving Fred Craig, Cook eventually made his Football League debut in December 1921, but played just seven matches before joining another Third Division South club, Brighton & Hove Albion, in 1924 for a £400 fee.

He was a first-team regular during his first season with Albion, but was displaced by Stan Webb in his second and left the club. He joined Darlington on a month's trial later that year, but did not make a first-team appearance. He played nine matches in the Third Division North and two in the FA Cup for Stockport County during the first half of the 1928–29 season, before finishing his career in non-league football with Harrogate.

The 1939 Register lists Cook living in Harrogate, Yorkshire, and working as a motorworks fitter's labourer. He died in Harrogate in 1973.
