= Suzanne Campbell =

Irish television director, producer and food writer

Suzanne Campbell is an Irish television director, producer and food writer. The Irish Independent has described her as one of "the most important, well-informed voices in Irish food".

She produced “Ear to the Ground” RTE’s farming programme and wrote the television series What Are You Eating?, based on her book Basket Case: What's Happening to Ireland's Food?. She is a member of the Irish Agricultural Journalists Guild and the Irish Food Writers' Guild.

Her parents are from Northern Ireland and she lives in County Wicklow. She has lived in Tokyo and has also travelled extensively and written about the Middle East, Africa and India.

She has reported for RTE Radio 1 since 2009 on food and farming issues and is founder of the Irish Food Writing Awards. She is an advisory committee member of Treo Eile, the racehorse rehoming organisation.
