= Death of Brian Rossiter =

2002 child death in Ireland

Brian Rossiter
- Died: 14 September 2002 (aged 14); Cork, Ireland
- Cause of death: blunt force trauma to the head; open verdict
- Body discovered: Clonmel garda station

The death of Brian Rossiter occurred at Cork University Hospital in Cork, Ireland, on 14 September 2002, as a result of head injuries he had sustained several days earlier. Fourteen-year-old Brian Rossiter had been arrested for a public order offence on the night of 10/11 September 2002, falling into a coma whilst in custody at Clonmel garda station. Prior to his arrest, Rossiter had been assaulted by Noel Hannigan, who was later found guilty of this offence and sentenced to two and a half years imprisonment. However, the case was the focus of much controversy and media speculation within Ireland, owing to concerns as to whether the injuries that caused Rossiter's death occurred, not as a result of Hannigan's assault, but while he was in custody.

Rossiter's father took High Court action against the gardaí and called for CCTV cameras to be installed in all garda stations around Ireland, in every area of the station. An inquest into the death returned an open verdict and led to damages being paid to the boy's family.

== Background ==
Brian Rossiter was the fourth of seven children born to Pat and Siobhán Rossiter. Brian moved to Wexford on 31 August 2002 with his mother and three younger siblings after the separation of his parents. On 6 September 2002, he returned to Clonmel with his mother for the weekend, staying with his older sister Sharon (who was then aged 23). Due to return to Wexford on 8 September, he missed the bus and at around 12:30 am in the early morning of 9 September, was assaulted by Noel Hannigan near his sister's house on Cashel Street. Hannigan later admitted that he had headbutted Brian "four or five times" but denied punching him or kneeing him in the face. Rossiter sustained two black eyes and complained of a headache later that day and again on 10 September. On 10 September at approximately 9:30 in the evening, Rossiter, having allegedly drunk some cider and smoked some hash, was arrested along with his 14-year-old friend, Anthony O'Sullivan, for a public order offence. Another 14-year-old, Daniel Leahy, a friend of theirs, was arrested for criminal damage at the same time. Both O'Sullivan and Leahy alleged that they were assaulted by arresting gardaí officers. O'Sullivan claimed that Rossiter had told him he had also been assaulted by the gardaí. The Gardaí stated that whilst Brian gave abuse following his arrest, he then calmed down and fell asleep in his cell. They further stated that when they attempted to rouse him from his sleep at 09:30 the following morning, they could not wake him. Local doctors were called and Brian Rossiter was subsequently taken to St Joseph's Hospital in Clonmel before being transferred to Cork University Hospital. A garda investigation into the cause of his injuries was soon "at an advanced stage". Meanwhile, in Cork, consultant neurosurgeon Charles Marks extracted a clot from Brian Rossiter's brain, but he did not regain consciousness and was pronounced dead shortly after 5:30 on the afternoon of 13 September 2002. His funeral took place on 17 September 2002.

== High Court proceedings ==
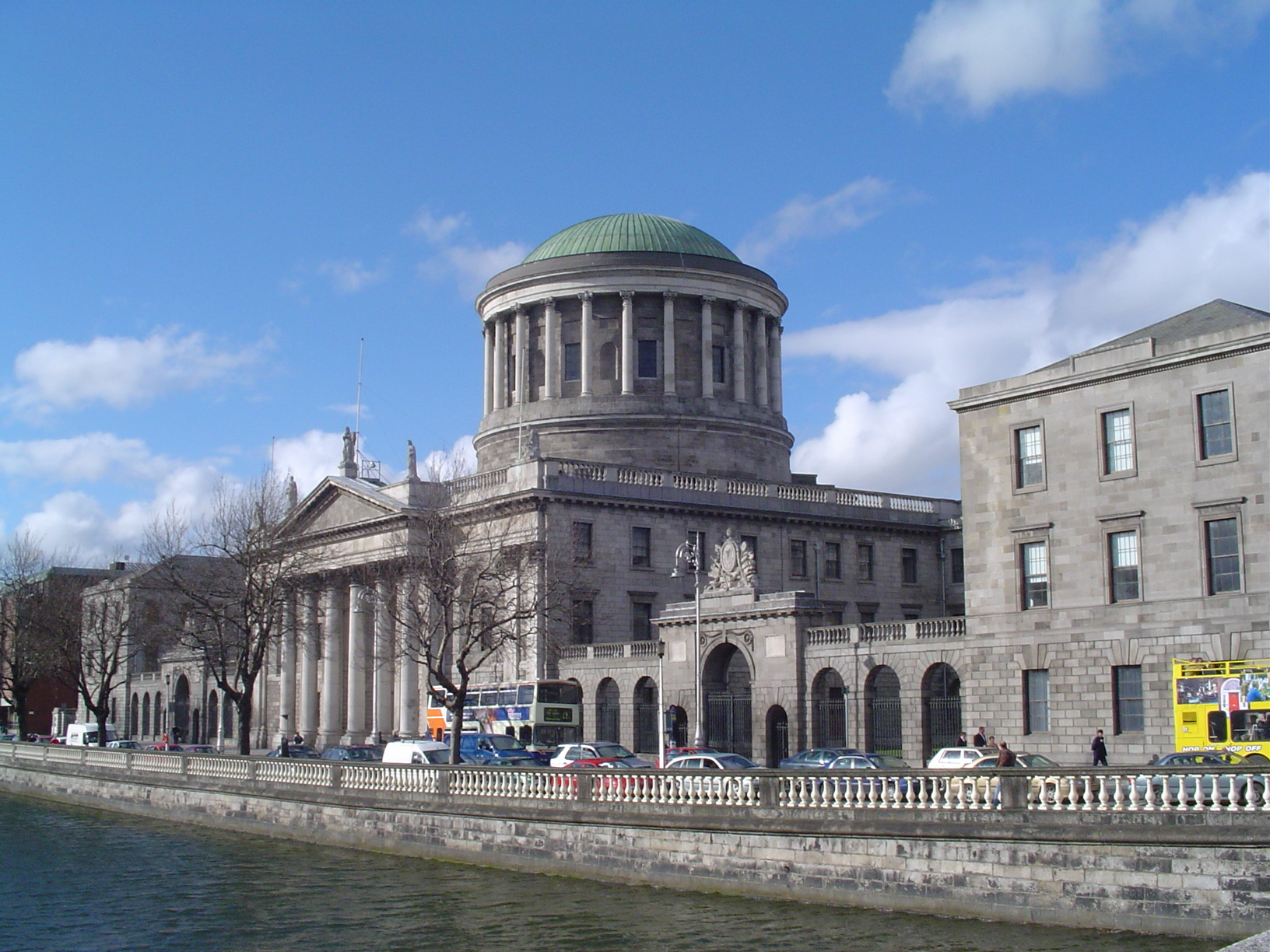
The Rossiters took High Court action at the Four Courts, Dublin.

Brian Rossiter's father took High Court proceedings against the gardaí, alleging their wrongful arrest of his son. He later threatened to do so for a second time in July 2005. A settlement was eventually reached in July 2008 which meant that an inquest into his son's death could hear evidence from two UK-based Professors of Forensic Pathology whom the Coroner had previously refused to call as witnesses. In addition, further civil action against the State was taken by the Rossiters in December 2008, after they were informed that internal Garda disciplinary proceedings were "none of their business".

== Hannigan sentencing ==
In November 2006, Noel Hannigan was sentenced to two and a half years imprisonment for assaulting Brian Rossiter. He had also been charged with manslaughter and assault causing serious harm, but these charges were later withdrawn, when a second inquiry, in addition to the statutory inquiry already announced, was launched in July 2005 to look into the reasons for charging Hannigan with manslaughter.

== Inquiry ==
On 30 June 2005, a statutory inquiry was announced by the then Irish Minister for Justice Michael McDowell into Brian Rossiter's death, with the Minister apologising to the family for the way the case had been handled so far. The inquiry, led by Senior Counsel Hugh Hartnett was criticised by Rossiter's family for its limited scope. Pat Rossiter expressed his lack of confidence that the inquiry would be permitted to ask if his son had been killed at the garda station, and if so, who was responsible. The family threatened not to participate. There was a disagreement over legal fees. McDowell, though, insisted that the inquiry would have full powers.

On 5 December 2005, the statutory inquiry into the death of Brian Rossiter opened in Dublin. It was expected to last for three months and to hear from 120 witnesses in private session. The Rossiter family's solicitor, Cian O'Carroll of Lynch and Partners, spoke of his belief that the terms of reference would still not allow the inquiry to get at the key issue, which he said was whether Rossiter had died from injuries inflicted inside the garda station or not, and, if he had sustained these injuries inside the garda station, then who had caused them. Pat Rossiter spoke of feeling "a bit anxious and a bit apprehensive" at the start of the inquiry but he also "hoped for the best". The Irish government had agreed to pay the family's out-of-pocket expenses, and for some of the preparatory work involved in the case.

The inquiry found no evidence that Rossiter had been assaulted inside the garda station, but found that he had been unlawfully detained by the gardaí. It sat for 80 days between December 2005 and September 2006, heard from 100 witnesses, including seven of Clonmel's gardaí, and reported in April 2008. In February 2008, Rossiter's family had criticised the Minister for Justice Michael McDowell, believing that he had set up the inquiry under the wrong Act. With the inquiry completed, however, an inquest into Brian Rossiter's death could now be held, as soon as a private action taken by the Rossiter family against Cork City Coroner, to allow evidence from two UK-based Professors of Forensic Pathology to be admissible, was settled.

== Inquest ==
=== Preliminary hearing ===
On 29 May 2007, a preliminary hearing took submissions from the Rossiter family and the State heard from the Cork City Coroner that she had questioned the time it was taking for the report into the circumstances surrounding Brian Rossiter's death to be published. Doctor Myra Cullinane told the hearing that she had twice written to the Hartnett Inquiry but had received no reply.

=== Inadequacies and contradictions ===
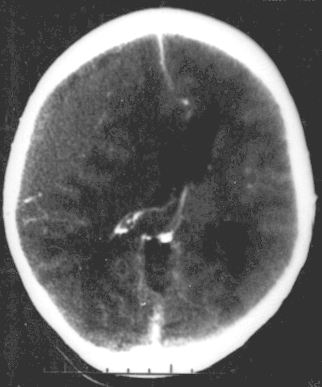
Brian Rossiter died from epidural hematoma to his skull. Above is an instance of nontraumatic epidural hematoma in a young woman. The grey area in the top left is organising hematoma, causing midline shift and compression of the ventricle.

The inquest proper began early in December 2008. Mary Furlong, a friend of Brian Rossiter's mother, told the inquest how she had witnessed a red mark the size of a two euro coin on the boy's left cheek when she visited him in hospital, claiming that such a mark had not been there earlier that week. Witness Anne Marie Hannigan claimed that all of her statement had not been read out in court, a statement which she alleged was to have contradicted that of Garda Pádraig Jennings and Garda Pádraig Frawley. She told the inquest that the gardaí had used force when they were arresting Rossiter and his friend, Anthony O'Sullivan, denying that she was making this up for her own satisfaction. A GP described her shock and despair upon her discovery of Rossiter's comatose body. Brian Rossiter's father told the inquest that a detective garda had informed him that his son had taken as many as sixteen ecstasy tablets, was "drunk out of his mind" and "as high as a kite", and yet later toxicology reports showed no evidence of this.

Three medical experts gave conflicting evidence into the nature of Brian Rossiter's injuries. Neurosurgeon Charles Marks, the consultant who operated on Brian when he was admitted to Cork University Hospital, said he believed "on the balance of probability" that Rossiter sustained the fatal injury 56 hours before his admission to hospital – a time corresponding to the Hannigan assault. Ireland's State Pathologist, Doctor Marie Cassidy told the inquest that she was unable to pinpoint the precise time at which Rossiter sustained his death injury – she said people were "getting caught up in trying to be specific, to date things that were impossible to date." Professor Christopher Milroy, a British Home office pathologist for 17 years and a reviewer of Rossiter's file, said it was more likely that he had sustained the injury which killed him subsequent to the Hanning assault, and closer to the time that he was found unconscious in his Clonmel prison cell.

On the day before the jury retired, a forensic pathologist said that it was impossible for him to determine whether the fatal strike had been inflicted late on the evening of 8 September, around the time that Hannigan's assault had taken place, or at a later date.

=== Verdict ===
On 12 December 2008, a jury retired after hearing evidence for eight days and returned an open verdict, after finding in accordance with medical evidence supplied that the boy died from an extradural haemorrhage due to blunt force trauma to the head. The jury felt that it was not possible to make a definitive statement concerning how Brian Rossiter had died – the Coroner had given them the option of delivering an open verdict or a narrative verdict, and had ruled out the option of a verdict of unlawful killing.

== Settlement ==
On 19 December 2008, a settlement of €200,000 plus legal costs and a written expression of regret, acknowledging wrongdoing on the part of the gardaí, was reached in the civil lawsuit taken by Rossiter's family against the Garda Commissioner, the Irish Minister for Justice and the Irish State. Mister Justice Richard Johnson approved the settlement. The Irish State acknowledged its acceptance that Rossiter's detention was unlawful, that the Treatment of Persons in Custody Act was not followed appropriately and that issues surrounding his death were not sufficiently investigated. The jury also made two recommendations relating to the treatment of persons in garda custody. These were that medical attention should be called to any garda station for any person, and especially those under the age of 17, if there were obvious signs of any injury or weakness, and that social services should be made available to gardaí at all times.

== Reaction ==
Rossiter's parents described their six-year battle for justice as "gruelling" but expressed the wish that their son's death had not been in vain and welcomed the recommendations made by the jury regarding improvements in health and safety, in cases where young people are detained. Rossiter's father said he would have gone further:

I would have gone further. I think there should be cameras in all areas of the Garda stations around the country – in corridors, entries, as well as exits. I think it's very important that CCTV should be in all areas of every Garda station.

== Awards ==
Investigative journalist Philip Boucher-Hayes received a Media Justice Award in 2005 for his coverage of this case.
