= Joe Little =

English footballer

Personal information
- Full name: Joseph Little
- Date of birth: 25 January 1902
- Place of birth: Leeds, England
- Date of death: 1965
- Positions: Outside left; left half

Senior career*
Years	Team	Apps	(Gls)
- Castleford Town
1920–1925	Plymouth Argyle	7	(0)
1925–1927	Darlington	62	(13)
1927–1929	Bradford Park Avenue	2	(1)
1929–1930	Rotherham United	24	(1)
- * Club domestic league appearances and goals

Joseph Little (25 January 1902 – 1965) was an English footballer who made 95 appearances in the Football League playing at outside left or left half for Plymouth Argyle, Darlington, Bradford Park Avenue and Rotherham United in the 1920s. He also played non-league football for Castleford Town.

== Life and career ==
Little was born in Leeds, and began his senior football career with Midland League club Castleford Town. Together with teammates Walter Cook and Cecil Eastwood, he transferred to Plymouth Argyle in May 1920, ahead of the club's first season in the newly formed Football League Third Division. The players were allowed to remain with Castleford to play in the remaining rounds of the West Riding Senior Cup; they won the semifinal, but lost 3–1 to Huddersfield Town in the final.

He made his Football League debut on 8 September for an injury-hit Argyle team at home to Crystal Palace, forming a new left-wing pairing with Billy Kellock; the Daily Express reporter felt their inclusion "did not improve the combination" between the forwards. Little himself was injured during the match, and did not play again that season. Cartilage problems in both knees restricted him to just seven appearances in four seasons – the Derby Daily Telegraph described him as "well known in the South as one of the unluckiest men who ever received a pay packet from the Plymouth Argyle club" – and he was made available on a free transfer in 1924.

Restored to fitness, Little signed for Second Division club Darlington early in the 1925–26 season. He enjoyed regular football, with 13 goals from 62 league appearances by the end of the following season, when the team were relegated to the third tier. In August 1927 he moved on to Bradford Park Avenue of the Third Division North. He contributed one goal from two appearances as Bradford won the title and promotion to the Second Division. The club re-signed him for the coming season, but he appeared only in the reserve team, and he moved on to Rotherham United at the end of the 1928–29 season. He scored on debut for Rotherham, in a 5–4 defeat away to Tranmere Rovers, and played 24 times for the club, initially in his usual position of left-sided forward, and later at left half.

Little died in 1965.
