= Rodney Rice (broadcaster) =

Irish journalist (1944–2021)

- Born: 12 October 1944; Whiteabbey, Northern Ireland
- Died: 29 August 2021 (aged 76); Dublin, Republic of Ireland
- Education: Trinity College Dublin
- Occupations: Journalist, broadcaster
- Years active: 1968–2009
- Notable credit(s): 7 Days, Here and Now, Saturday View, Worlds Apart

Rodney Rice (12 October 1944 – 29 August 2021) was a Northern Ireland-born journalist and broadcaster who spent the majority of his career working with national broadcaster RTÉ. He was regarded as "a pioneering journalist."

== Career ==
Born in Whiteabbey, County Antrim, Northern Ireland, Rice studied political science at Trinity College Dublin in the Republic of Ireland. After a period working with the Belfast Telegraph, he joined RTÉ in 1968 at the age of 24, where he first reported on the television current affairs programme 7 Days. In 1972, Rice transitioned to radio, and by 1974 he started hosting Here and Now, a daily mid-morning news and current affairs program that he led for nine years. By 1984, he shifted to Saturday View, a program he presented for 25 years, evolving into a platform for political discourse involving the nation's top leaders. Rice retired from broadcasting in 2009 but continued to support agencies who worked in the developing world such as Trócaire and Action Aid, where he served as chairman.

== Death ==
Rice died on 29 August 2021, aged 76.
