= Drivetime (RTÉ) =

Irish current affairs radio programme

- Genre: News and current affairs
- Running time: Weekdays: 4:00PM-6:00PM (November 2025 - present)
- Country of origin: Ireland
- Language: English
- Home station: RTÉ Radio 1
- Hosted by: Katie Hannon & Colm O’Mongain (November 2025 - present)
- Produced by: Various
- Recording studio: Donnybrook, Dublin 4
- Original release: 31 December 1961 – present
- Audio format: FM and Digital radio
- Website: Official Site

Drivetime is an Irish news and current affairs radio programme broadcast by RTÉ Radio 1 every weekday between 4:00PM and 6:00PM (November 2025 – present ) it was formerly broadcast weekdays from 4:30PM–7:00PM for many years. Its most recent former presents are Sarah Mcinerney & Cormac O’Headra. Its current presents are Katie Hanon & Colm O’Mongain (November 2025 – present ) and its current reports and cover presenters include John Cooke, Barry Lenihan and Una Kelly among others.

On Bank Holidays a shorter programme is often aired from 4:00PM–5:00PM. The programme includes news summaries, sports news, and traffic and weather reports as well as live interviews and reports. Special extended editions of Drivetime are mounted from time to time to cover such major news stories as general elections and referendums.

== See also ==
- Morning Ireland
