= RTÉ News at One =

News at One
- Genre: News and Current Affairs
- Running time: 45 minutes
- Country of origin: Ireland
- Language(s): English
- Home station: RTÉ Radio 1
- Hosted by: Rachael English
- Recording studio: Donnybrook, Dublin
- Website: http://www.rte.ie/news/news1pm/

RTÉ News at One is a news and current affairs programme broadcast on RTÉ Radio 1. It airs Monday to Friday for 45 minutes at 1:00pm.

The programme was presented by Bryan Dobson until his retirement on 3 May 2024. Rachael English was announced as his successor from July 2024. An extended news bulletin takes up the first few minutes of the programme. This is then typically followed by a series of interviews. It finishes with sports news, business news, and a summary of news from around the regions.

Lengthened editions are also aired on the occasion of major breaking news stories such as general elections or referendums. As of February 2009, the programme had an audience of 335,000 listeners.

The first debate of the 2011 presidential election was broadcast on this programme.
