= Morning Ireland =

- Genre: News and Current Affairs
- Running time: 2 hours
- Country of origin: Ireland
- Language: English
- Home station: RTÉ Radio 1
- TV adaptations: RTÉ News Channel 0700-0900 daily
- Hosted by: Gavin Jennings; Audrey Carville; Justin McCarthy; Sarah McInerney
- Edited by: Catherine Farrell; Brendan Fitzpatrick; Conor Barrins; Moira Hannon; Peadar Breathnach; Emma McNamara
- Senior editor: John Burke
- Recording studio: Donnybrook, Dublin
- Original release: 5 November 1984 – present
- Website: Morning Ireland
- Podcast: Morning Ireland

Morning Ireland is an Irish breakfast news programme broadcast by RTÉ Radio 1 and is noted as the country's most listened to radio programme.It is broadcast each weekday morning between 7 am and 9 am and alternate items are normally presented by two presenters from the current rota, which includes Audrey Carville, Gavin Jennings, Sarah McInerney and Justin McCarthy.

Occasional weekend editions are also aired on the occasion of major breaking news stories such as general elections, referendums or important news events.

The programme has been broadcast since 1984 and since that time has been presented by numerous eminent broadcasters including Aine Lawlor, Cathal Mac Coille, David Hanly, Mary Wilson, Bryan Dobson, and Joe Little. On its 25th anniversary in 2009, the Irish Examiner called it "a phenomenal triumph".

The programme is thought to be important and influential to the field of politics in Ireland: Former President of Ireland Mary McAleese was a frequent contributor to the programme and, according to Noel Whelan of The Irish Times, "more often than not the first question asked of the Taoiseach raises something which was reported or said a few hours previously on Morning Ireland". Government ministers use the show to explain their views.

== History ==
The programme was first broadcast on 4 November 1984. It replaced The Derek Davis Show. It had initially been postponed and endured a difficult time during its early years. The first major story to be covered by the programme was a few weeks after it began when an air crash in Eastbourne killed a number of journalists.

The first presenters of the programme were David Hanly and David Davin-Power. Davin-Power was also the first editor. Cathal Mac Coille succeeded David Hanly as the programme's signature voice, presenting it from 1986 to 1990 and again from 2001 to his retirement in 2017. Joe Little and Shane Kenny are other former editors and presenters. John Murray presented for the first time in 1994, returning in 2004. Aine Lawlor began presenting alongside Hanly in 1995.

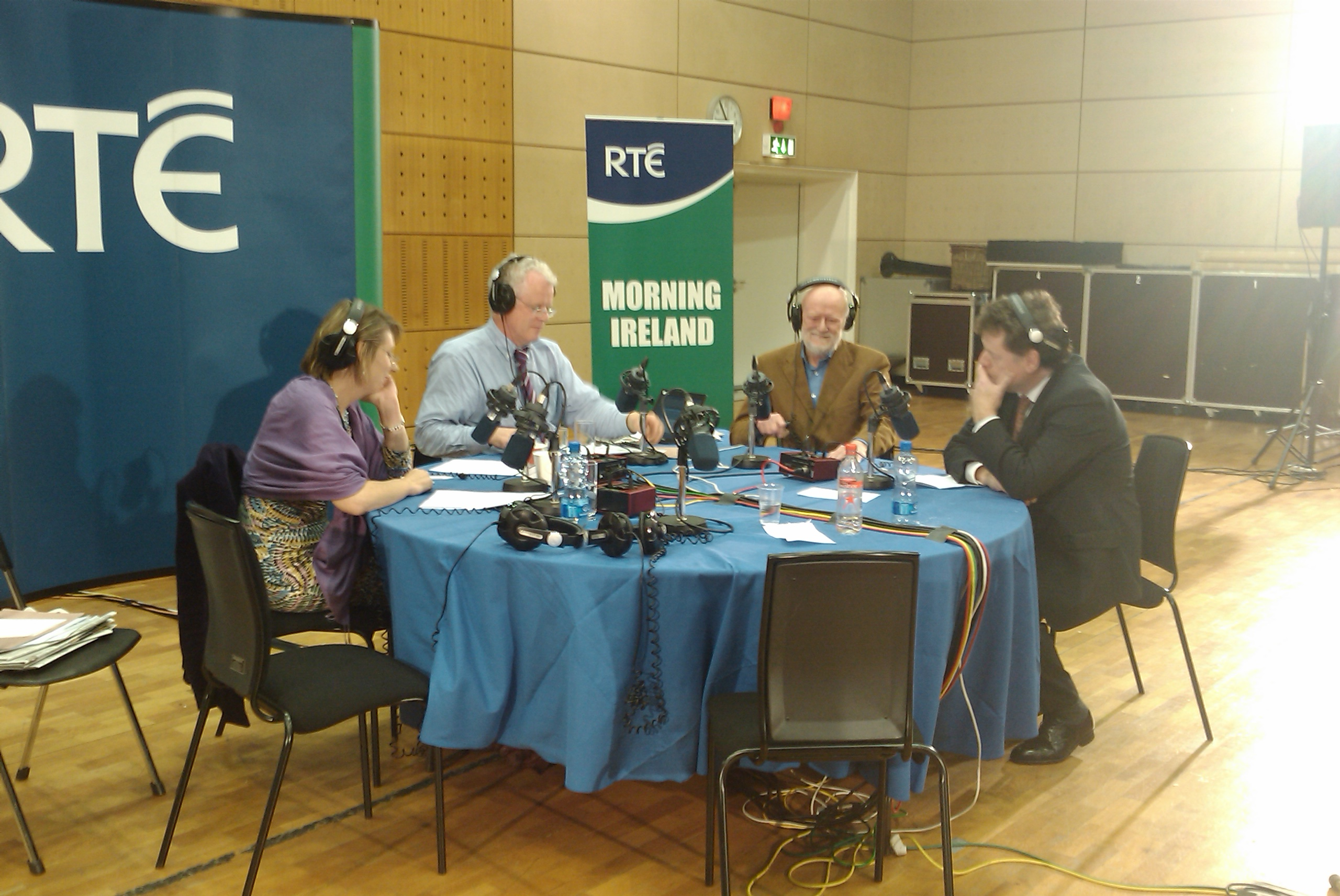
Presenters Cathal Mac Coille and Aine Lawlor with David Hanly and David Davin-Power

When Fianna Fáil's former government minister Desmond O'Malley left the party, Morning Ireland broadcast his renowned "I stand by the Republic" speech for an extended period, angering then Taoiseach Charles Haughey.

In 1994, Joe Little was due to co-present an edition of the programme from the RTÉ studio in Castlebar, County Mayo, during the European Parliament election of that year, when it was realised belatedly that it could not be heard in Dublin. Disaster was prevented by mere minutes. When the IRA announced its cease-fire that same year, Joe Little was in the Belfast studio beginning an interview with the former Secretary of State for Northern Ireland, Sir Patrick Mayhew, when the sound broke down live on air on a temporary basis. During one edition, the entire programme did malfunction, and, with interviews suspended and a commercial break impossible, Hanly intervened to prevent a complete disaster for several minutes by commenting to the show's previous guest: "There was one other question I wanted to ask you [...]". Joe Little interviewed Lady Valerie Goulding to commemorate the fiftieth anniversary of The Blitz of London by Germany.

In 1999, for Christmas Eve, the programme focused on those killed during The Troubles. Contributors to that programme included world leaders such as Bertie Ahern, Tony Blair, Bill Clinton, and Mary McAleese. In 2005, a Mary McAleese interview for the programme caused controversy when she compared the children of Northern Ireland to Nazis. Ian Paisley Jr replied, "So much for bridge-building Mary", and described her remarks as "irrational and insulting". The Orange Institution cancelled a meeting it had ordered with McAleese as a result.

During the 2000s recession, an outside broadcast took place in the Waterford Crystal plant as employees barricaded themselves inside in a bid to save their careers. In another episode Minister for Finance, Brian Lenihan, criticised John Murray for his "dangerous and irresponsible" line of questioning about Irish banks.

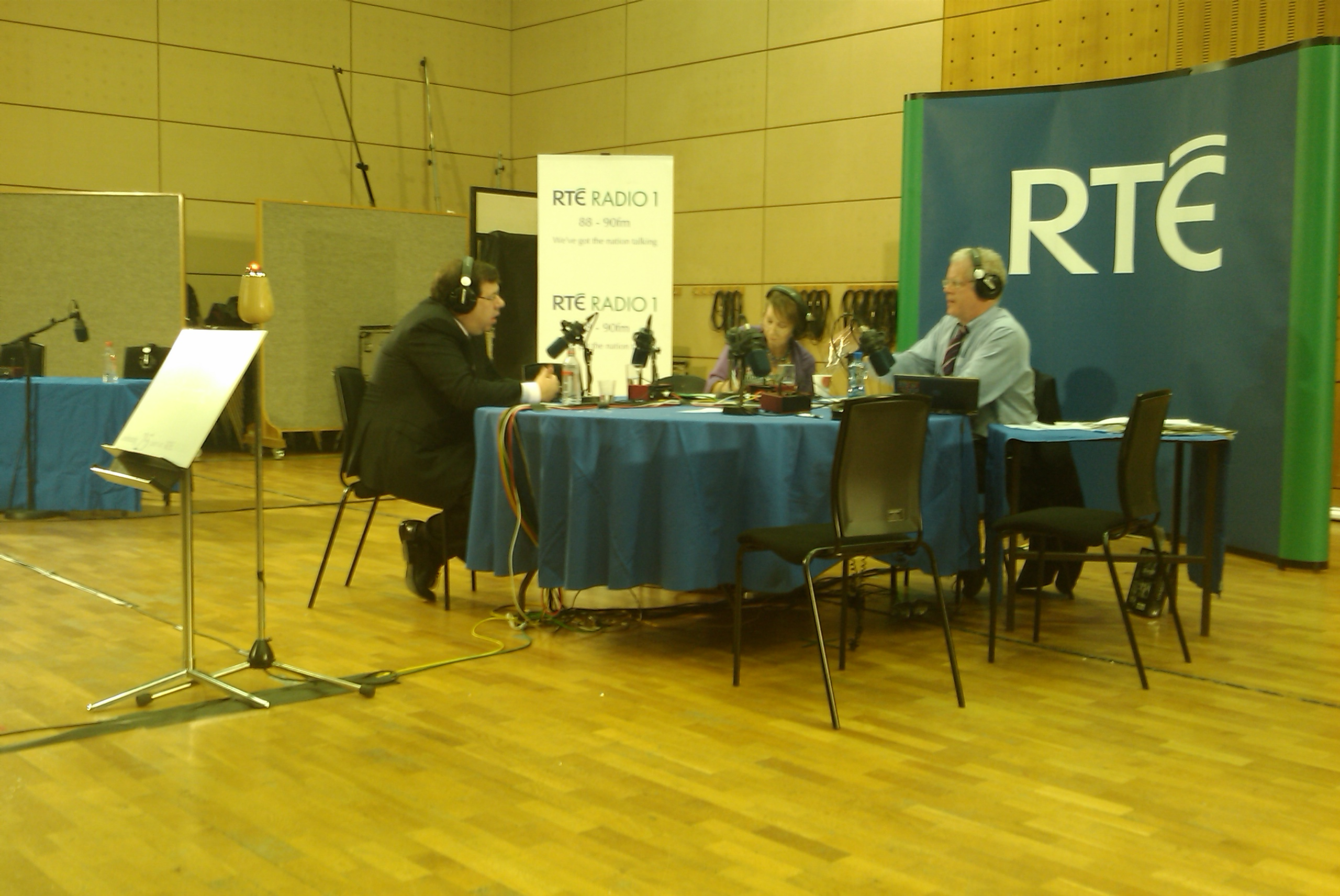
Brian Cowen on Morning Ireland at the 25th Anniversary celebration

Morning Ireland celebrated its 25th anniversary in November 2009. It was broadcast in front of a studio audience and featured guests including Mary McAleese, Brian Cowen, comedian Des Bishop and author Cathy Kelly. McAleese spoke of her intention to reduce her household budget during difficult recessionary times, including sending e-mails instead of posting cards for Christmas.

In 2010 the programme came to international attention after Taoiseach Brian Cowen gave a controversial nine-minute interview to Cathal Mac Coille from a Fianna Fáil think-in in Galway; the interview led to increased pressure for Cowen to resign in the days that followed due to allegations that he was drunk during the interview.

Garret FitzGerald made his final radio broadcast on the programme in 2011.

In 2010, two presenters, John Murray and Richard Downes, left the programme to expand to further areas of RTÉ, and were replaced by Aoife Kavanagh and Rachael English. The programme has also been presented by Claire Byrne, Gavin Jennings, and Fran McNulty.

24 September 2025 marked the final broadcast for Mary Wilson and Aine Lawlor; Wilson officially retired from RTÉ whereas Lawlor announced she was stepping back from the show, but will continue to present The Week in Politics.

In early 2026, RTÉ presenter Sarah McInerney began co-presenting the show, after moving from DriveTime. Justin McCarthy began presenting the programme in September 2025.

The current presenters are Audrey Carville, Sarah McInerney, Justin McCarthy and Gavin Jennings. John Burke is the series editor of the programme.

On the 13 April 2026, Morning Ireland received an updated audio identity as part of RTÉ Radio 1's new audio identity rollout. The distinct, old tune was removed.

=== Awards ===
Morning Ireland won 'News Programme of the Year' in the 2002, 2003 and 2008 PPI Radio Awards. Cian McCormack, a reporter for the programme, won News Reporter of the Year in 2009.

Hilary McGouran, Series Editor, and Shane McElhatton, Editor, were named by Village as amongst the 100 most influential people in Ireland in 2009. The studio and web producer of the programme, Lisa Pereira, a native of Trinidad and Tobago and educated in Ireland, France and the United States, was also on the list.

== Format ==
The programme, which is co-presented by various presenters, consists of a mixture of live interviews and pre-recorded location reports. Extended news bulletins are broadcast at 07.00 and 08.00, followed by a weather forecast and "It Says In The Papers", a review of the Irish morning newspapers. There are news headlines followed by sports news at 07.30 and 08.30 and business news is broadcast at 07.45. AA Roadwatch provided traffic news for decades throughout the programme, however this was stopped in 2021. Since then, RTÉ provides its own traffic updates.

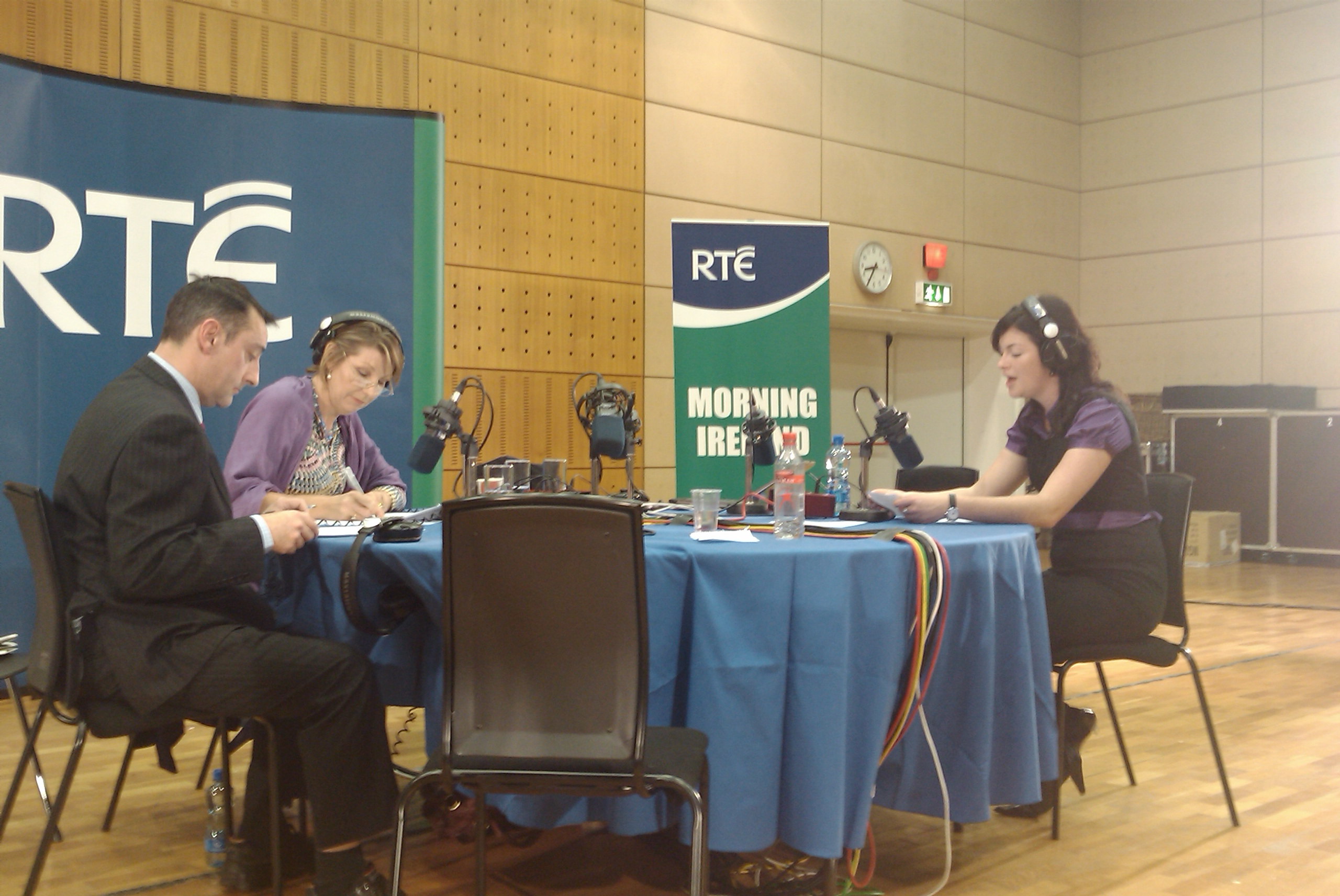
Brian Jennings (newsreader), Aine Lawlor (presenter), Nicola Hudson (AA Roadwatch)

A new website was launched in June 2009. It features additional material and a webcam that allows listeners to view the programme from the studio. The live stream from the webcam is also broadcast on RTÉ's rolling news channel.

== Ratings ==
Morning Ireland is the top rated radio programme in Ireland, with a listenership estimated by the Joint National Listenership Survey to be 452,000. It is considered the most influential news programme on Irish radio. When ratings for the radio shows of prominent RTÉ broadcasters such as Joe Duffy, Pat Kenny, and Gerry Ryan were declining in 2005, Morning Ireland remained Ireland's most popular radio programme. It was at one point rivalled by The Full Irish in second place before that show ended.

Despite being the radio programme with the highest listenership in Ireland for years, its listenership is declining, especially among young people.

== Rebroadcasts ==
A half-hour segment of Morning Ireland forms part of the WRN North America stream that is currently re-broadcast on shortwave by Radio Miami International (WRMI).
