= 2020 in Irish television =

The following is a list of events relating to television in Ireland from 2020.

== Events ==
=== January ===
- 2 January – The death of broadcaster Marian Finucane, who presented Crimecall in the 1990s, is announced.
- 7 January – The death of broadcaster Larry Gogan, best known as a 2fm disc-jockey, who provided the RTÉ television commentary at the 1978, 1980, 1981 and 1982 Eurovision Song Contests, is announced.
- 24 January – ITV Box Office, a pay-per-view television service from ITV, and the only ITV service available in Ireland via Sky, ceases broadcasting.
- 30 January – RTÉ2 airs a groundbreaking edition of First Dates in which a man from Cork discusses his HIV diagnosis with his date.

=== February ===
- 8 February –
  - RTÉ announce the death of newsreader Keelin Shanley at the age of 51 following a two-year battle with cancer.
  - Dancing with the Stars makes history with the first all-male and all-female dance parings for "Switch-Up Week", as Brian Dowling dances with Kai Widdrington, while Lottie Ryan is paired with Emily Barker.

=== March ===
- 9 March – ITV magazine programme This Morning returns to Virgin Media One five months after an overhaul of the daytime schedule removed it from the channel.
- 13 March – Following the introduction of restrictions on social gatherings because of the COVID-19 pandemic, RTÉ One airs the first edition of The Late Late Show to go ahead without a studio audience.
- 15 March – Lottie Ryan and professional dancer Pasquale La Rocca win series four of Dancing with the Stars.
- 16 March – Claire Byrne presents her show, Claire Byrne Live, from her garden shed after placing herself into voluntary self-isolation because she was showing signs of a cold.
- 17 March – Taoiseach Leo Varadkar makes a special broadcast to the nation called A Ministerial Broadcast by An Taoiseach Leo Varadkar, TD, in which he says the COVID-19 emergency could go on for months into the summer.
- 18 March – In response to COVID-19 restrictions on social gatherings, RTÉ announces that its rolling news channel, RTÉ News Now, will air a daily Mass service from the Cathedral of St Eunan and St Columba in Letterkenny, each weekday at 10.30am until at least 29 March when restrictions are reviewed. The service will be followed each day by a short religions message from representatives of other faiths and Christian denominations in Ireland.
- 27 March – Miriam O'Callaghan presents The Late Late Show after Ryan Tubridy is forced to self-isolate due to a "persistent couth". It is the first time a woman has presented an entire edition of the show. Her guests include Simon Harris, Brendan O'Carroll, Jennifer Gibney, Hozier and Brian O'Driscoll. RTÉ subsequently confirms the show was watched by an average viewership of 863,000, a 61% audience share.
- 30 March –
  - Launch of RTÉ's Home School Hub and its companion show, Home School Extra; both programmes are created in response to the closure of all schools during the COVID-19 pandemic in the Republic of Ireland.
  - It is confirmed that Ryan Tubridy has tested positive for coronavirus.

=== April ===
- 3 April – Miriam O'Callaghan presents The Late Late Show for a second week as Ryan Tubridy continues to self-isolate with coronavirus.
- 5 April – Virgin Media One's The 6 O'Clock Show urges viewers to send in video messages for their grandparents, who may not have smart devices, which will then be broadcast on the show in order to help them stay connected with their relatives during the COVID lockdown.
- 10 April – Ryan Tubridy returns to The Late Late Show following a two week absence because of COVID-19, and opens the show with an emotional monologue describing his experience with the virus.
- 16 April – RTÉ2 begins airing editions of Home School Hub with Irish Sign Language for hearing impaired viewers.
- 17 April – Irish funeral directors and Irish state broadcaster RTÉ launch a virtual memorial wall for victims of COVID-19, allowing relatives to post tributes. The wall will also be complemented by memorial segments broadcast on radio and television.
- 19 April – RTÉ2, RTÉ 2fm, and RTÉ Player simulcast One World: Together at Home, a two-hour global benefit concert in aid of the fight against COVID-19, with Doireann Garrihy and Eoghan McDermott providing coverage from an Irish perspective.
- 20 April – TG4 launches Cúla4 Ar Scoil ("Cúla 4 at School"), an Irish language equivalent to RTÉ Home School Hub.
- 24 April – Pat Kiely is to step down as managing director of Virgin Media Television in July.

=== May ===
- 6 May – Paul Farrell is appointed as the new managing director of Virgin Media Television, succeeding Pat Kiely from July.
- 16 May – RTÉ One airs Eurovision: Europe Shine A Light to mark the cancelled 2020 Eurovision Song Contest. The programme, broadcast by all countries participating in the competition, showcases the forty one acts that would have appeared in Eurovision 2020.
- 24 May – A Sunday Times piece by Julieanne Corr notes the high number of repeats shown by both RTÉ and Virgin Media Television since the start of the pandemic.

=== June ===
- 5 June – The RTÉ Audience Research survey for the period 2 March–17 May indicates that almost four million people, roughly 90% of the TV viewing population, tuned in to the broadcaster as the COVID-19 pandemic unfolded, with news programmes such as the Six One News and Nine O'Clock News, having a particularly strong audience.
- 26 June – RTÉ Does Comic Relief is held. The event is broadcast live on RTÉ One and the RTÉ Player for over four hours with over €5 million raised for charities.

=== July ===
- 7 July – RTÉ airs the final signed edition of Home School Hub.
- 16 July – Production of the next series of Ireland's Fittest Family has been moved to the Kilruddery Estate in County Wicklow in order to facilitate a COVID secure environment while it takes place.
- 22 July –
  - RTÉ postpones the fifth series of Dancing with the Stars, originally scheduled for 2021, due to the ongoing COVID-19 pandemic.
  - Virgin Media Television broadcasts a number of its programmes live from Limerick as part of its #BackingBusiness campaign to encourage people to support Irish businesses which have been affected by the COVID-19 pandemic.
- 23 July – Ivan Yates leaves his presenting role at Virgin Media One's The Tonight Show.

=== August ===
- 14 August – Coco Television confirms that First Dates Ireland will return for a new series in 2021, but with changes to protect participants from the risk of COVID-19 that will see any physical contact between contestants banned for the time being.
- 23 August – The Sunday Independent reports that RTÉ has told the Irish Government it forecasts a deficit of €36m for 2020 as a result of the fallout from the COVID-19 pandemic.
- 24 August – Production begins on the next series of Ireland's Fittest Family despite new restrictions on outdoor gatherings.
- 27 August – Ciara Doherty co-presents her final edition of Ireland AM.
- 31 August –
  - David McCullagh begins presenting the Six One News alongside Caitríona Perry.
  - RTÉ rebrands its rolling news channel RTÉ News Now to RTÉ News channel with minor changes to its programming line-up.

=== September ===
- 4 September – The Late Late Show returns after its summer break, with Mícheál Ó Muircheartaigh appearing as one of its guests.

=== October ===
- 12 October – With Ireland in Level 3 COVID restrictions and winter approaching, an edition of Claire Byrne Live tells viewers how to dress for outdoor dining with the help of polar explorer Pat Falvey.
- 21 October – Gogglebox Ireland announces major changes to its cast as Ireland re-enters Level 5 COVID restrictions, which prohibit indoor gatherings and visitors to homes and gardens.

=== November ===
- 20 November – RTÉ's top news presenters apologise after being present at a gathering in Montrose where social distancing was not fully observed and presenters posed for photographs.
- 24 November – The winner of the 2020 News2day Christmas Art competition is announced.
- 27 November – The Late Late Toy Show is broadcast on RTÉ One, and becomes the most watched programme on Irish television in 2020.

=== December ===
- 7 December – An edition of Claire Byrne Live includes a segment advising people how to have a safe Christmas dinner if they are inviting guests, but draws criticism from some viewers for comparing COVID-19 to cigarette smoke and urging people to open their doors and windows when the outside temperature is very low.
- 11 December – The annual The Late Late Show Country Music Special returns, with a guest appearance by Dolly Parton.
- 12 December – Virgin Media One broadcasts Ireland Under Lockdown: COVID-19 Stories, a programme presented by Zara King which takes a look back at how Ireland coped with the onset of the COVID-19 pandemic.
- 18 December – The year's final edition of The Late Late Show features musicians participating in the annual Grafton Street busk, but with the event moved indoors from its usual location to the studio because of COVID-19 regulations. The event raises funds for the Simon Community homeless charity.
- 24 December –
  - Ruth Smith and Mary Kennedy present Christmas at Home on RTÉ One. The programme includes musical contributions from Celine Byrne, Una Healy, Ray Lynam, Mick Flannery, Allie Sherlock, the RTÉ Concert Orchestra and RTÉ Cór na nÓg.
  - Comedy duo The 2 Johnnies make a Christmas Eve appearance on RTÉ2 with The 2 Johnnies Christmas Spectacular.
- 25 December –
  - Christmas Day highlights on RTÉ One include the animated film Angela's Christmas Wish, a sequel to Angela's Christmas, and based on the works of Frank McCourt.
  - TG4 airs the documentary Maureen O'Hara – Banríon Hollywood about Maureen O'Hara.
- 27 December – Jennifer Zamparelli and Nicky Byrne present Dancing With The Stars – Putting On The Glitz, a one hour special of the series.
- 28 December – Katie Walsh, Ruby Walsh and Nina Carberry win the 2020 Christmas celebrity special of Ireland's Fittest Family together with €10,000 for their charity of choice.
- 29 December – Christmas viewing figures indicate the Christmas Eve edition of the Six One News, during which Father Christmas is shown leaving the North Pole for Ireland, was the most watched programme over the holiday period, with an average audience of 583,200. It is the first time in a decade that Mrs Brown's Boys fails to secure the number one position, with the Christmas Day edition coming second, with 486,400 viewers.

== Debuts ==
- 7 January – The Style Counsellors
- 22 March – Keys To My Life
- 31 March – Miss Scarlet and The Duke
- 18 May – Dead Still

== Ongoing television programmes ==
=== 1960s ===
- RTÉ News: Nine O'Clock (1961–present)
- RTÉ News: Six One (1962–present)
- The Late Late Show (1962–present)

=== 1970s ===
- The Late Late Toy Show (1975–present)
- The Sunday Game (1979–present)

=== 1980s ===
- Fair City (1989–present)
- RTÉ News: One O'Clock (1989–present)

=== 1990s ===
- Would You Believe (1990s–present)
- Winning Streak (1990–present)
- Prime Time (1992–present)
- Nuacht RTÉ (1995–present)
- Nuacht TG4 (1996–present)
- Ros na Rún (1996–present)
- TV3 News (1998–present)
- Ireland AM (1999–present)
- Telly Bingo (1999–present)

=== 2000s ===
- Nationwide (2000–present)
- TV3 News at 5.30 (2001–present) – now known as the 5.30
- Against the Head (2003–present)
- news2day (2003–present)
- Other Voices (2003–present)
- Saturday Night with Miriam (2005–present)
- The Week in Politics (2006–present)
- At Your Service (2008–present)
- Operation Transformation (2008–present)
- 3e News (2009–present)
- Dragons' Den (2009–present)
- Two Tube (2009–present)

=== 2010s ===
- Jack Taylor (2010–present)
- Mrs. Brown's Boys (2011–present)
- MasterChef Ireland (2011–present)
- Today (2012–present)
- The Works (2012–present)
- Celebrity MasterChef Ireland (2013–present)
- Second Captains Live (2013–present)
- Claire Byrne Live (2015–present)
- The Restaurant (2015–present)
- Red Rock (2015–present)
- TV3 News at 8 (2015–present)
- First Dates (2016–present)
- Dancing with the Stars (2017–present)
- The Tommy Tiernan Show (2017–present)
- Striking Out (2017–present)

== Ending this year ==
- 8 January – Red Rock (2015)

== Deaths ==
- 2 January – Marian Finucane, radio and TV presenter, who presented Crimecall in the 1990s.
- 7 January – Larry Gogan, disc jockey and TV compere, best known as a 2fm disc-jockey, who provided the RTÉ television commentary at the 1978, 1980, 1981 and 1982 Eurovision Song Contest.
- 8 February – Keelin Shanley, 51, journalist and newsreader

== See also ==
- 2020 in Ireland
