= 2023 in Irish television =

The following is a list of events relating to television in Ireland from 2023.

== Events ==
=== January ===
- 1 January – RTÉ New Years Eve celebrations include Jennifer Zamparelli hosting a New Year's Eve Party, from 10.15pm on RTÉ One which is followed by the NYE Countdown Concert with Westlife from the new festival village on North Wall Quay.
- 19 January – RTÉ and Virgin Media have agreed a joint broadcast deal to show the Six Nations Championship on free-to-air television in Ireland.
- 22 January – It is announced that due to unforeseen circumstances, professional dancer, Maurizio Benenato has left Dancing with the Stars. He is replaced with Robert Rowiński, a previous dancer on the show.

=== February ===
- 1 February – An Irish version of the Challenge television station launches on Saorview.
- 3 February – Wild Youth are selected to represent Ireland in the 2023 Eurovision Song Contest with their song "We Are One".
- 8 February – TG4 airs a documentary on the response to and immediate aftermath of the Creeslough explosion, despite some of the victims' families expressing concern about the timing of the programme.
- 16 February – The Mirror reports that Winning Streak will not return to RTÉ One during 2023, but that talks are under way to "freshen up" some of the games when it does return.

=== March ===
- 9 March – A live weather report on heavy snowfall during the Six One News is interrupted by a protester making anti-LGBTQ comments.
- 15 March – Launch of the media regulator Coimisiún na Meán, which succeeds the Broadcasting Authority of Ireland.
- 16 March – Ryan Tubridy announces that he will be stepping down as the presenter of The Late Late Show after 14 years.
- 17 March – World Rugby confirm that RTÉ and Virgin Media have secured the broadcasting rights to show coverage of the 2023 Rugby World Cup.
- 19 March – Carl Mullan alongside partner Emily Barker win the sixth season of Dancing with the Stars.

=== April ===
- 3 April – Mairéad Ronan confirms she will not return as presenter of Ireland's Fittest Family when the series returns for its eleventh season.
- 12 April – RTÉ One drops its usual daily broadcast of The Angelus before the Six One News in order to provide coverage of US President Joe Biden's visit to Ireland.
- 18 April – Kevin Bakhurst, former director of the UK's media watchdog Ofcom, is appointed as the new Director-General of RTÉ, replacing Dee Forbes, and will take up the position from July.
- 27 April – Virgin Media Four launches on Sky channel 160, and on 159 on Sky Glass.

=== May ===
- 4 May – Caitríona Perry announces that she will be leaving RTÉ after almost 16 years to take up a new international role as chief presenter with the BBC based in Washington.
- 7 May – The 19th Irish Film & Television Awards take place in Dublin with highlights of the ceremony shown on 8 May on RTÉ One.
- 9 May – Ireland's Wild Youth are eliminated from the 2023 Eurovision Song Contest at the event's first semi-final in Liverpool.
- 20 May – RTÉ announces that Patrick Kielty will succeed Ryan Tubridy as presenter of The Late Late Show.
- 24 May – TG4 announces that it is hiring new weather presenters and continuity announces. No experience is required, apart from a written and spoken knowledge of the Irish language.
- 26 May –
  - Catriona Perry co-presents her final edition of RTÉ One's Six One News.
  - Ryan Tubridy presents his final edition of The Late Late Show.

=== June ===
- 8 June – RTÉ 2fm DJ Laura Fox is announced as the new presenter of Ireland's Fittest Family, while Olympic athlete Sonia O'Sullivan will take over from Anna Geary as a coach as Geary is on maternity leave.
- 21 June – Dee Forbes, Director General of RTÉ, is suspended from her employment by the RTÉ Board, and later issues a statement defending her record.
- 22 June –
  - RTÉ admits that it paid its top presenter Ryan Tubridy €345,000 more than publicly declared between 2017 and 2022, in what the chair of its board says was a "serious breach of trust with the public".
  - Adrian Lynch, RTÉ Director of Channels & Marketing, is appointed to the position of Deputy Director General of RTÉ.
- 23 June – Ryan Tubridy issues a statement in which he says he had "no responsibility for the corporate governance in RTÉ or how or what they publish in their accounts", but that he should have questioned the figures when they were published.
- 26 June – Dee Forbes resigns as Director-General of RTÉ with immediate effect, following ongoing controversy over undisclosed payments to broadcaster Ryan Tubridy.

=== July ===
- 4 July – Media Minister Catherine Martin announces an independent "root and branch examination" into RTÉ.
- 6 July – During a hearing of the Oireachtas Media Committee, Fine Gael TD Brendan Griffin accuses RTÉ of running a slush fund, including a payment of €5,000 on flip-flops.
- 10 July – New RTÉ Director-General Kevin Bakhurst stands down the RTÉ Board, and appoints a new temporary leadership team.
- 11 July – Ryan Tubridy speaks for the first time about the RTÉ pay controversy, saying that he has become "the face of a national scandal".
- 19 July – RTÉ One and RTÉ2 launch special idents for the 2023 FIFA Women's World Cup ahead of the tournament's opening match the next day.
- 28 July – The media regulator Coimisiún na Meán signs a new ten year national free-to-air Television Programme Service Contract with Virgin Media Television Limited.

=== August ===
- 3 August – A report by the UK's media watchdog Ofcom indicates Channel 4 comedy Derry Girls was the most watched programme in Northern Ireland during 2022.
- 4 August – UTV presenter Pamela Ballantine reveals to the Belfast Telegraph that she was diagnosed with breast cancer in 2022 and has undergone successful chemotherapy, and urges women to have breast screening tests.
- 11 August – RTÉ Director-General Kevin Bakhurst confirms that legal firm McCann Fitzgerald has begun a review into voluntary redundancy schemes at the broadcaster in 2017 and 2021.
- 17 August – In an email to staff, RTÉ Director-General Kevin Bakhurst says there are no plans for Ryan Tubridy to return to the broadcaster "for now" after he was taken off air in June following controversy over his salary.
- 22 August – RTÉ One airs the 2023 Rose of Tralee, which draws a peak audience of 576,000. Those figures combined with views on RTÉ Player give the contest more than a million views.
- 25 August – The deadline expires for potential sponsorship bids for The Late Late Show after Renault ended their eight year sponsorship of the show in May.
- 29 August – RTÉ confirms that Dancing with the Stars will return for a seventh season, with hosts Jennifer Zamparelli and Doireann Garrihy returning for fifth and second season respectively.

=== September ===
- 4 September – RTÉ announce two new permanent news presenters for the Six One and Nine O'Clock News. From Monday 7 September, Sharon Tobin will join David McCullagh on the Six One News, while Ray Kennedy will join Sharon Ní Bheoláin on the Nine O'Clock News.
- 5 September – Professional dancer Emily Barker announces her departure from Dancing with the Stars after six years with the series.
- 7 September –
  - During an appearance on RTÉ News at One, Taoiseach Leo Varadkar says he believes Ireland is "on the path to unification" and that there will be a United Ireland in his life time.
  - Vodafone and KFC are confirmed as sponsors of the 2023 Rugby World Cup coverage on RTÉ and Virgin Media Television.
- 8 September – Ireland gets two new channels with the launch of the timeshift channel TG4+1, and the dedicated Irish language children's channel Cúla 4.
- 11 September – Great! Movies and Great! TV launch on Sky Media in Ireland.
- 13 September – RTÉ introduces an immediate ban on recruitment as it experiences a fall in licence fee revenue.
- 15 September –
  - Patrick Kielty presents his first edition of The Late Late Show, describing doing so as "truly the honour of a lifetime".
  - Permanent TSB have signed a two-year contract to sponsor The Late Late Show.
  - Virgin Media Television announces a new sponsorship deal with McDonald's and McDelivery for Gogglebox Ireland.
- 18 September – Australian soap Neighbours returns to television in Ireland, airing on RTÉ One and RTÉ 2, as well as being available on Amazon Freevee.
- 22 September – Patrick Kielty's second edition of The Late Late Show is watched by an average of 548,000 viewers, a drop from 830,000 for the first edition on 15 September.

=== October ===
- 6 October – The annual The Late Late Show Country Music Special returns with Patrick Kielty presenting his first edition. The show is pre-recorded unlike in previous years.
- 7 October – Virgin Media One provides coverage of Ireland's Rugby World Cup match against Scotland, which is subsequently described by RTÉ's Oliver Callan as "dull" and "like watching a very dry business meeting" and "four men at a funeral".
- 8 October –
  - TG4 airs the final of Junior Eurovision Éire during which Co Donegal singer Jessica McKean is selected to represent Ireland at the 2023 Junior Eurovision Song Contest in Nice.
  - Big Brother returns for a new series after a five year break. Having been recommissioned by ITV in the UK, the programme is available in Ireland via Virgin Media One and Virgin Media Player.
- 12 October – RTÉ teletext service RTÉ Aertel closes after 36 years in operation.
- 14 October – Virgin Media Television achieves the highest audience of its 25 year history after the 2023 Rugby World Cup quarter final match between Ireland and New Zealand, aired on Virgin Media One, is watched by 1.378 million viewers.
- 20 October – Virgin Media Television announces the appointment of Áine Ní Chaoindealbháin as its next managing director. She will replace Paul Farrell, who steps down from the role in December.
- 23 October – RTÉ One's Upfront with Katie Hannon broadcasts a lengthy debate about cannabis after the Citizens' Assembly recommended the government adopts a health led approach to drugs use.
- 31 October – Professional dancer Maurizio Benenato confirms he will not return to Dancing with the Stars, having left the show two weeks into the previous season for personal reasons.

=== November ===
- 6 November – RTÉ One airs the first in a two-part docudrama, The Nobody Zone – Interview with an Irish Serial Killer, which tells the story of suspected serial killer Kieran Patrick Kelly, who confessed to a dozen murders when arrested by police in London in 1983.
- 12 November –
  - The Sunday World reports that Derry couple Carla and James "Shez" Sherry are the first couple to have married after meeting on First Dates following their marriage in June 2023. They are also the first couple from the show to become parents after Carla Sherry gave birth to a daughter in September.
  - John Nolan becomes the third professional dancer to announce their decision to leave Dancing with the Stars.
- 14 November – Publication of the document A New Direction for RTÉ in which the broadcaster announces cost-cutting plans. They include a voluntary redundancy scheme to reduce their staff by 400 by 2028, and the closure of their timeshift channels, as well as an upgrade to RTÉ Player. The Irish Government has also signed off a deal to provide the broadcaster with an additional annual €56m.
- 15 November – RTÉ One airs Tomorrow Tonight, a scripted docu-drama set in 2050 and focusing on the effects of climate change. It is presented by Mark Little and Carla O'Brien.
- 24 November – Patrick Kielty presents his first edition of The Late Late Toy Show on RTÉ One. It would go on to be the most watched TV programme of 2023 in Ireland with 1,575,800 people watching the show.
- 28 November –
  - Closure date for people to respond to the survey on RTÉ's plans announced on 14 November.
  - RTÉ announces that professional dancers Montel Hewson, Jillian Bromwich and Simone Arena will join Dancing with the Stars when it returns for a seventh series in January 2024. It is also confirmed that Michael Danilczuk and Hannah Kelly will not return to the cast.

=== December ===
- 1 December – The Late Late Show pays tribute to Shane MacGowan following his death the previous day, opening with a rendition of "A Rainy Night in Soho" led by Glen Hansard, and including stories and tributes from friends, as well as presenter Patrick Kielty. The show, which also features an appearance from Take That, is watched by an audience of half a million, with RTÉ later reporting that a record 5,500 people applied for tickets to be in the audience.
- 14 December – Virgin Media One airs a special edition of Ireland AM produced with the help of ChatGPT and Google Bard.
- 16 December – Gymnast Rhys McClenaghan is voted 2023 RTÉ Sports Person of the Year.
- 17 December – The Stratford family from County Cavan, coached by Donncha O'Callaghan, win season eleven of Ireland's Fittest Family.
- 31 December – RTÉ One's New Years Eve celebrations include a special edition of The Late Late Show at 10.15pm featuring a line up of guests including Midge Ure, Wheatus, The Tumbling Paddies and the RTÉ Concert Orchestra. This is followed by The New Year's Eve Countdown Concert from Dublin Castle featuring Picture This and presented by Anna Geary. The Late Late Show is watched by an audience of 531,000 viewers, while viewers take to social media to comment on the lack of a presenter to ring in the New Year during the coverage of The New Year's Eve Countdown, which instead sees Picture This playing one of their songs up until ten seconds to midnight, followed by an onscreen countdown.

== Debuts ==
- 30 January – Upfront with Katie Hannon on RTÉ One (2023-2025)
- 2 October – Love in the Country on RTÉ Two
- TBD – High Road, Low Road on RTÉ One
- 9 February – Lady Gregory, Ireland's First Social Influencer, on RTÉ One
- 30 March – Sisters on RTÉ One.
- 2 April – Ireland's Smartest on RTÉ One
- 14 May – Clean Sweep on RTÉ One
- TBD – Page Turners on RTÉ Two
- TBD – Neven's Greenway Food Trails on RTÉ One
- 1 October – The Money List on RTÉ One
- 19 October – The 2 Johnnies' Late Night Lock In on RTÉ Two.

== Ending this year ==
- 9 February – Eco Eye

== Ongoing television programmes ==
=== 1960s ===
- RTÉ News: Nine O'Clock (1961–present)
- RTÉ News: Six One (1962–present)
- The Late Late Show (1962–present)

=== 1970s ===
- The Late Late Toy Show (1975–present)
- The Sunday Game (1979–present)

=== 1980s ===
- Fair City (1989–present)
- RTÉ News: One O'Clock (1989–present)

=== 1990s ===
- Would You Believe (1990s–present)
- Winning Streak (1990–present)
- Prime Time (1992–present)
- Nuacht RTÉ (1995–present)
- Nuacht TG4 (1996–present)
- Reeling In the Years (1999–present)
- Ros na Rún (1996–present)
- Virgin Media News (1998–present)
- Ireland AM (1999–present)
- Telly Bingo (1999–present)

=== 2000s ===
- Nationwide (2000–present)
- Virgin Media News (2001–present) – now known as the 5.30
- Against the Head (2003–present)
- news2day (2003–present)
- Other Voices (2003–present)
- The Week in Politics (2006–present)
- At Your Service (2008–present)
- Operation Transformation (2008–present)
- Two Tube (2009–present)

=== 2010s ===
- Room to Improve (2007–present)
- Jack Taylor (2010–present)
- Mrs. Brown's Boys (2011–present)
- MasterChef Ireland (2011–present)
- Today (2012–present)
- The Works (2012–present)
- Second Captains Live (2013–present)
- Ireland's Fittest Family (2014–present)
- The Restaurant (2015–present)
- Red Rock (2015–present)
- First Dates (2016–present)
- Dancing with the Stars (2017–2020, 2022–present)
- The Tommy Tiernan Show (2017–present)

=== 2020s ===
- DIY SOS: The Big Build Ireland (2020–present)
- The Style Counsellors (2020–present)
- Smother (2021–present)

== Deaths ==
- 12 February – James Flynn, 57, film and television producer (Vikings, The Last Duel, The Banshees of Inisherin).
- 8 June – Kerri-Anne Donaldson, 38, dancer and choreographer (Dancing with the Stars)
- 11 June – Michael A. Noonan, 82, television writer.
- 28 September – Michael Gambon, 82, Irish-English actor (Harry Potter, Gosford Park, The King's Speech)
- 11 December – Frank Twomey, Irish children's TV entertainer (Bosco, Bull Island). (death announced on this date)
