= 2021 in Irish television =

The following is a list of events relating to television in Ireland from 2021.

== Events ==
=== January ===
- 11 January – RTÉ's Home School Hub makes a return as schools in Ireland return to remote learning because of the pandemic.
- 14 January – It is reported that a petition calling for RTÉ to remove The Angelus, which precedes the evening RTÉ News: Six One, has been signed by 2,200 people.
- 15 January – The National Lottery and RTÉ confirm that the Saturday night gameshow Winning Streak will not be returning for the foreseeable future due to "ongoing restrictions related to Covid-19".
- 28 January – Boxer Katie Taylor is named the 2020 RTÉ Sports Person of the Year, the second time she has won the award. The RTÉ Sports Awards ceremony, presented by Joanne Cantwell and Darragh Maloney, has been delayed from its usual December date due to the delays in sporting events for 2020 caused by the COVID-19 pandemic.

=== February ===
- 21 February – The Mahoney family from County Wexford, coached by Davy Fitzgerald, win season eight of Ireland's Fittest Family.
- 26 February – RTÉ announces the cancellation of Soccer Republic, with the show not returning for the 2021 League of Ireland season.

=== March ===
- 10 March – RTÉ2 +1 is added to Sky on channel 202.
- 11 March – Taoiseach Micheál Martin makes an appearance on Home School Hub, where he is interviewed by Seamus the puppet dog.
- 19 March – The final edition of RTÉ's Home School Hub is aired.

=== August ===
- 10 August – Matt Cooper announces he will be leaving his role as presenter of Virgin Media One's The Tonight Show.
- 29 August – Virgin Media Television announces that Claire Brock will succeed Matt Cooper as presenter of The Tonight Show.

=== September ===
- 3 September – The Late Late Show returns for a new series, with a very small studio audience allowed to return for the first time since March 2020, but with strict adherence to COVID-19 restrictions.
- 17 September – Anna Daly presents her final edition of Virgin Media One's Ireland AM after 12 years with the programme.
- 27 September – Return of RTÉ Today, with Anna Daly, Joe O'Shea and Aoife Moore joining the programme.

=== November ===
- 8 November – RTÉ One airs Keelin Shanley: Faraway, Still Close, a documentary about the late news presenter, Keelin Shanley, made by her husband, Conor Ferguson. The documentary is also made available on RTÉ Player.
- 12 November – RTÉ confirms that Dancing with the Stars will return for a fifth series in January 2022. Arthur Gourounlian will also join the judging panel for the new judge on the new series.
- 26 November – The Late Late Toy Show is broadcast on RTÉ One, and becomes the most watched programme on Irish television in 2021.
- 30 November – Sky News joins Saorview on Channel 23.

=== December ===
- 18 December – National Hunt jockey Rachael Blackmore is voted the 2021 RTÉ Sports Person of the Year.
- 19 December – The Kinsella family from County Wexford, coached by Anna Geary, win the ninth season of Ireland's Fittest Family.
- 27 December – David and Stephen Flynn and their family win the 2021 Christmas celebrity special of Ireland's Fittest Family along with €10,000 for their charity of choice.

== Debuts ==
- 7 January – Clear History on RTÉ2
- 7 March – Smother on RTÉ1
- 10 April – Home Advantage on RTÉ1
- 11 April – Keys to my Life on RTÉ1
- 12 September – Kin on RTÉ

== Ongoing television programmes ==
=== 1960s ===
- RTÉ News: Nine O'Clock (1961–present)
- RTÉ News: Six One (1962–present)
- The Late Late Show (1962–present)

=== 1970s ===
- The Late Late Toy Show (1975–present)
- The Sunday Game (1979–present)

=== 1980s ===
- Fair City (1989–present)
- RTÉ News: One O'Clock (1989–present)

=== 1990s ===
- Would You Believe (1990s–present)
- Winning Streak (1990–present)
- Prime Time (1992–present)
- Nuacht RTÉ (1995–present)
- Nuacht TG4 (1996–present)
- Reeling In the Years (1999–present)
- Ros na Rún (1996–present)
- TV3 News (1998–present)
- Ireland AM (1999–present)
- Telly Bingo (1999–present)

=== 2000s ===
- Nationwide (2000–present)
- TV3 News at 5.30 (2001–present) – now known as the 5.30
- Against the Head (2003–present)
- news2day (2003–present)
- Other Voices (2003–present)
- The Week in Politics (2006–present)
- At Your Service (2008–present)
- Operation Transformation (2008–present)
- 3e News (2009–present)
- Two Tube (2009–present)

=== 2010s ===
- Jack Taylor (2010–present)
- Mrs. Brown's Boys (2011–present)
- MasterChef Ireland (2011–present)
- Today (2012–present)
- The Works (2012–present)
- Celebrity MasterChef Ireland (2013–present)
- Second Captains Live (2013–present)
- Ireland's Fittest Family (2014–present)
- Claire Byrne Live (2015–present)
- The Restaurant (2015–present)
- Red Rock (2015–present)
- TV3 News at 8 (2015–present)
- First Dates (2016–present)
- The Tommy Tiernan Show (2017–present)
- Striking Out (2017–present)

=== 2020s ===
- The Style Counsellors (2020–present)

== Deaths ==
- 8 February – Rynagh O'Grady, 69, actress (Abbey Theatre, Father Ted).
- 10 April – Shay Healy, 78, broadcaster, journalist and songwriter, Parkinson's disease.

== See also ==
- 2021 in Ireland
