= Tommy Meskill =

Irish journalist

- Born: 1994 (age 32); Ennis, County Clare, Ireland
- Education: Dublin City University (B.A.)
- Occupation: Journalist
- Employer: RTÉ
- Notable credit(s): RTÉ News; East Coast FM; FM104; Dublin's Q102 news2day

Tommy Meskill (born 1994) is an Irish journalist and newscaster employed by RTÉ, where he has co-presented the Six One News since December 2025. He previously was the London correspondent from July 2024 to December 2025 and a political reporter for RTÉ News. He has presented programmes on radio and television, including news2day, Morning Ireland and This Week, as well as the Nine O'Clock and One O'Clock News.

== Career ==
Meskill completed a BA in Communications Studies from Dublin City University and interned with Clare FM during his studies. After graduating, he worked as a newsreader and reporter with Spirit Radio, East Coast FM, Dublin's Q102 and FM104.

In 2015, he won best radio production of the year in news and current affairs in the National Student Media Awards.

Meskill joined RTÉ in 2016 and worked across various programmes, including RTÉ2's news2day and RTÉ Radio 1's Morning Ireland. He has also presented This Week and RTÉ One's European Parliament Report, as well as the Six One, Nine O'Clock and One O'Clock News as an occasional newscaster.

On 2 July 2024, Meskill was announced as the RTÉ News London correspondent to succeed John Kilraine, just two days ahead of the UK general election. Prior to his appointment, he had worked as part of RTÉ's political staff, reporting from Leinster House and the European Parliament.

In November 2024, Meskill was assigned by RTÉ News to report on Sinn Féin leader Mary Lou McDonald for the general election.

In December 2025, RTÉ announced Meskill as the new co-presenter of the Six One News alongside Sharon Tobin.

== Personal life ==
Meskill is a native of Ennis, County Clare and is a former student of Rice College. He is married and currently resides in Clare and Longford.

In 2021, he was the grand marshal for the St Patrick's Day parade in Ennis.

Media offices
Preceded by John Kilraine	RTÉ News London Correspondent; 2024–2025	Succeeded by Sean Whelan
