= RTÉ News (TV channel) =

Irish television news station

- Logo used since 2014
- Country: Ireland
- Broadcast area: Worldwide
- Headquarters: Donnybrook, Dublin

Programming
- Languages: English; Irish; Irish Sign Language

Ownership
- Owner: Raidió Teilifís Éireann
- Sister channels: RTÉ One; RTÉ2; RTÉ KIDSjr; RTÉ Kids

History
- Launched: 12 June 2008
- Former names: RTÉ News Now (2012–2020)

Links
- Website: rte.ie/news

Availability

Terrestrial
- Saorview: Channel 21

Streaming media
- RTÉ Player: Watch live (Worldwide)
- Virgin TV Anywhere: Watch live (Ireland only)

The RTÉ News channel is an Irish free-to-air news television channel owned and operated by RTÉ. The channel launched as RTÉ News Now available exclusively online on 12 June 2008. The channel began broadcasting as a free-to-air channel on 29 October 2010 on Saorview.

The channel broadcasts free-to-air and commercial-free. It is available in Ireland and globally online, on mobile phones and an iPhone/iPad application is also widely available free. It is operated by RTÉ's department RTÉ News and Current Affairs and broadcasts in the Irish, English and ISL languages.

The channel was rebranded from RTÉ News Now to RTÉ News in August 2020 with minor changes to its programming line-up. As part of the rebrand, the channel is complemented with a new-look app.

== History ==
RTÉ News NOW was originally available only to online users of the RTÉ website and on mobile phones when the channel launched on 12 June 2008. Availability of the channel improved during test trials of Saorview in December 2009. The channel was made available since May 2010 on train services within Dublin city and surrounding regions under a special agreement between CIÉ and RTÉ. Previously, Sky News provided such a service. Since October 29, 2010 the channel is available free-to-air to 98% of homes throughout the Republic of Ireland through Saorview. Upon the announcement in February 2011 that RTÉ News NOW would become a permanent fixture to the Saorview line-up a number of media organizations criticized such a move claiming RTÉ would continue to have a monopoly over news output within Ireland.

In 2017, Head of News and Current Affairs at RTÉ Jon Williams suggested that he could discontinue RTÉ News Now to save money and therefore in August 2020, he re-branded the channel as RTÉ News.

In 2022 RTÉ Radio developed two visual news rooms from which Morning Ireland and This Week broadcast from.

== Advertising ==
RTÉ News is currently one of two RTÉ channels that does not carry advertising. The other being RTÉjr. In January 2015, it was reported that RTÉ intend to ask the Minister for Communications to allow them carry advertising on RTÉ News Now as part of an overhaul of the service. Such a proposal needs government approval.

== Format ==
The channel regularly simulcasts live news bulletins and current affairs programmes as they are broadcast on RTÉ One, and also that of the children's news programme RTÉ news2day which airs on RTÉ2. The remaining programming on the channel serves as a replay service of the most recent news, sport and weather bulletins, the streaming of raw feeds of breaking news stories and 'filler' programmes such as 'news headlines'. The channel also airs the latest breaking news stories from Ireland and around the world.

== Scheduling ==
The channel airs live news programmes such as Six One, as they are broadcast on other RTÉ channels, along with weather forecasts. During other periods, live current affairs programmes such as Prime Time are shown. Outside of these hours the most recent show is repeated, looped, unless interrupted by live feeds of breaking news stories. Up-to-the-minute financial data and weather are also broadcast on-air. As with many other stations, a live ticker is provided, across the bottom of the screen, providing headlines sourced from content on the broadcaster's website.

RTÉ have a number of bulletins on the channel that do not air on RTÉ One or RTÉ Two; they also provide a live Irish language news bulletin at 17:00 each weekday. They provide special reports from different news and current affairs programming, this is identified as RTÉ News Now Highlights. News2Day also appears on the channel.

RTÉ have proposed some other changes to the RTÉ News Now schedule:

- Television news bulletins at 08:00 and 09:00 during Morning Ireland
- Sporting events that RTÉ have rights to but cannot currently provide coverage due to scheduling conflicts
- Extra sporting analysis that currently runs on RTÉ's live Internet service

There are no TV news bulletins on RTÉ News, television news starts at 13:00 with the One O'Clock news while it ends at 21:30 with the Nine News and mid-week with Current Affairs programming at 22:30.

== Programming ==
The channel broadcasts a mix of news and current affairs shows.

=== News ===
The channel airs the following RTÉ news programmes live:

- Morning Ireland
- RTÉ News: One O'Clock
- RTÉ News: Six One
- RTÉ News: Nine O'Clock
- Nuacht RTÉ at 17.00 and at 17.40 (Irish language) (including RTÉ News with Signing)
- News2day (Children's news bulletin)
- RTÉ Weather as RTÉ ONE

==== Former RTÉ news programmes ====
- RTÉ News @ 10:00, 11:00, 12:00, 15.00, 16.00 & 23:00
- RTÉ News on 2
- Regular news bulletins as shown on RTÉ One and 2 throughout the day were also simulcast on RTÉ News Now. RTÉ One and 2 no longer carry news bulletins.
- Claire Byrne Live

==== Typical Weekday Schedule ====
As of August 2020, the following is a typical weekday schedule currently broadcast on the channel:

- 07.00 – Morning Ireland: simulcast of the RTÉ Radio 1 show
- 09.00 – Wake Up Europe: simulcast of euronews
- 10.00 – Today with Claire Byrne: simulcast of the RTÉ Radio 1 show
- 11.00 – Latest News and Weather: repeated on a loop for the rest of the hour
- 12.00 – Latest News and Weather: repeated on a loop for the rest of the hour
- 13:00 – RTÉ News: One O'Clock. Live simulcast of RTÉ One's lunchtime news bulletin
- 13.30 – The One O'Clock News is repeated on a loop until 15:00
- 15:00 – Latest News and Weather
- 16:00 – Latest News and Weather, repeated on a loop for the rest of the hour (includes live simulcast of News2day at 16:45)
- 17:00 – Nuacht RTÉ le TG4, repeated on a loop until 17.40
- 17:40 – Nuacht RTÉ le TG4 and News with ISL: Live simulcast with RTÉ One
- 18:01 – RTÉ News: Six One: Live simulcast of RTÉ One's flagship evening news bulletin
- 19:00 – Latest News and Weather
- 20:00 – Nuacht TG4
- 21:00 – RTÉ News: Nine O'Clock: Live simulcast of RTÉ One's nightly news bulletin
- 21:35 – Prime Time (Tuesday/Thursday) / Latest News and Weather (Monday, Wednesday, Friday to Sunday)
- 22:10 – Latest News and Weather
- 23:00 – RTÉ News Update / Prime Time
- 23:30 – Nuacht TG4
- 23:50 – euronews simulcast until 07:00

==== Raw Politics ====
euronews' Raw Politics broadcast on the channel each day from November 2018 airing separate to the Euronews channel, before the show was cancelled by euronews.

==== Breaking news ====
The channel provides analysis of breaking news stories domestically and internationally.

==== Overnight and special simulcasts ====
RTÉ News channel simulcasts Euronews from 23:00 to 7:00 every day.

=== RTÉ Weather ===
RTÉ Weather provides the channel with weather updates, some updates are a re-broadcast of what has previously aired across RTÉ television or updates produced specific to the channel. Due to commercial advertising being prohibited from the channel weather updates have no sponsorship unlike other updates across RTÉ television and radio.

=== RTÉ Entertainment ===
RTÉ Entertainment (formally called RTÉ TEN (The Entertainment Network)) provides viewers with up-to-the minute showbiz news from music reviews, interviews and film premieres. The show aired daily and hosts a weekly round-up show each weekend.

=== Current affairs ===
It broadcasts these current affairs shows:

- Prime Time
- Prime Time Investigates
- The Week In Politics
- Nationwide
- Oireachtas Report
- Leader's Questions
- Late Debate

=== Sports ===
RTÉ News Now broadcast the opening and closing ceremonies of the Summer and Winter Olympic Games, they also have a special highlights programming for the duration of the games provided by the Olympic Broadcast Services.

They also broadcast the All-Ireland Senior Football Championship and All-Ireland Senior Hurling Championship finals along with RTÉ2.

=== RTÉ News rebrands ===
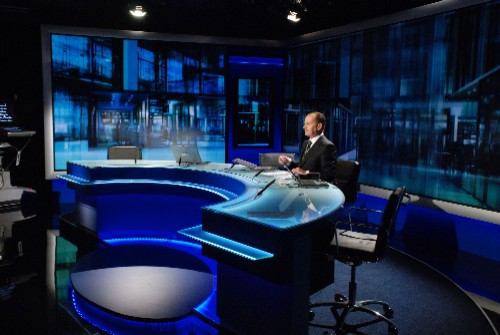
The RTÉ News Studio in 2009

On 9 February 2009 RTÉ News received a major revamp, with a new 'walk-around' studio, new music, titles and graphics. The new look also lead to the revamp of RTÉ News Now's on-screen rolling tickers. Weather forecasts form of a core of the news bulletins, like much of RTÉ's news. During commercial breaks a new RTÉ News Now ident was shown.

On 25 May 2011 RTÉ News Now revamped its on-screen identity giving viewers more detailed content.

On 30 November 2014 RTÉ News Now revealed its new on-air identity inline with RTÉ News rebrand in early 2014.

In August 2020, RTÉ News Now changed its name to RTÉ News with minor changes to its programming. As part of the rebrand, the channel released a new-look app.

== Availability ==
The channel is available nationwide as of 29 October 2010 on Saorview, Ireland's national digital terrestrial service. On 2 October 2012 it also launched on UPC Ireland. On 18 January 2016 it launched on Sky Ireland. The channel is available online throughout the world, without restriction. The service is available through a special iPhone application. Currently, the service is available in Windows Media Player and RealPlayer formats, and in Flash H.264 format on the Ireland-only RTÉ player. On 19 January 2010 RTÉ announced a new application for the iPhone and iPod Touch. It was announced on 19 May 2010 that RTÉ News Now would begin appearing on Transvision digital screens in the main Dublin Bus and Train stations (Heuston, Connolly, Pearse and Busaras). In November 2010, the service became available, free of charge, on Android smartphone customers through the app store, Android Market for use over 3G networks and wi-fi, regardless of service provider.

== RTÉ News App ==
On Thursday 17 April 2014 RTÉ News Now launched a new app for both iPhone and Android. With over 1 million downloads the service is the most used news app in the Republic of Ireland. The News Now App provide users with an expanded range of content and new features. The service will eventually be made available on iPad and other tablets.

On 28 August 2020, the RTÉ News Now App was rebranded to the RTÉ News app ahead of the channels refresh.

== Strategy: 2012 to 2017 ==
On 16 September 2013 RTÉ management announced its Strategy:2012–2017. Under the strategy, RTÉ confirmed its commitment to the 24 hour news channel. It is hoped that the channel will broadcast live bulletins from 07:00 – 00:00 with fewer repeats. Over 80% of the channel's existing content is made-up of repeats with exception to live news broadcasts and breaking news stories. RTÉ want to drive the channel towards becoming "the driver of the 24-hour news cycle.”

By 2018, due to the lack of revenue available for the channel and low viewing figures, RTÉ's Dee Forbes confirmed her intention to close the channel by early 2019 following a review by the government and broadcasting authorities. An internal review within RTÉ also determined if the stations closure was imminent. With early morning news bulletins discontinued on RTE 1, the only morning news coverage on RTE Television is now provided on RTE News Now with the live simulcast of RTE Radio 1's Morning Ireland web-stream and short news updates at 10.00 am and 11.00am.

In August 2020, RTÉ confirmed it would continue with the channel for the foreseeable future and plans on refreshing the channel and expanding live broadcasts from September.

== COVID-19 pandemic programming ==
During the COVID-19 pandemic, mass was broadcast daily at 10:30am from different churches around Ireland, normally a relay of the churches' own webcasts. A press conference chaired by Chief Medical Officer Tony Holohan and members of the National Public Health Emergency Team, initially each weekday evening, then twice weekly, was broadcast, as it often coincided with the Six One News on RTÉ One, so the RTÉ News channel would broadcast the press conference, then follow that with a re-broadcast of the Six One News.

== Awards ==
In October 2008, RTÉ News Now won the award for Business Services at the Inspired IT Awards in Dublin. In November 2010, RTÉ News Now iPhone app won Best Media app, Best Apple App and the Grand Prix awards at 'The Appy's 2010 with The Carphone Wareshouse'.

== Logo history ==
Logo of RTÉ News Now, 2009–2014

Logo of RTÉ News Now, 2014–2020

Logo of the RTÉ News channel, 2020–present

== See also ==
- RTÉ News and Current Affairs
- RTÉ Digital Radio News
- News broadcasting
- List of news channels
