= Carla O'Brien =

Carla O'Brien may refer to:

- Carla O'Brien (artist)
- Carla O'Brien (journalist)
