= RTÉ News: Six One =

Irish television news programme

- Genre: News, Sport
- Created by: RTÉ News and Current Affairs
- Presented by: Sharon Tobin; Tommy Meskill
- Country of origin: Ireland
- Original languages: English, Irish

Production
- Production locations: Studio 3, RTÉ Television Centre, Donnybrook, Dublin 4
- Camera setup: Multi-camera
- Running time: 59 minutes (Weekday); 29 minutes (Weekend)

Original release
- Network: RTÉ One; RTÉ News channel
- Release: 1 January 1962 – present

Related
- RTÉ News: One O'Clock; RTÉ News: Nine O'Clock

RTÉ News: Six One is RTÉ's evening news programme broadcast on the Irish television channels RTÉ One and RTÉ News at 6:01pm. The bulletin airs until 7pm on weekdays and until 6:30pm on weekends, when it is styled as RTÉ News and Sport. Six One airs after Nuacht RTÉ (news in Irish), which airs at 5:40pm, and The Angelus at 6pm. It is co-presented by Sharon Tobin and Tommy Meskill.

The programme is produced by RTÉ News and Current Affairs, a division of Raidio Teilifis Éireann.

== History ==
Former station identification graphic from 9 February 2009 to 25 April 2014

Teilifís Éireann made its first news broadcast at 6:00pm on 1 January 1962, the first day of full programming for the new television station. The ten-minute bulletin was read by Charles Mitchel, who remained as RTÉ's chief television newsreader until his retirement in 1984. He was accompanied in the early years by Andy O'Mahony and, from 1966, by Maurice O'Doherty.

A year after its launch, the early evening bulletin was moved to 5.50 pm to accommodate a new weeknight current affairs programme called Broadsheet, which provided more detailed analysis and reportage on the issues of the day. In September 1964, the 5.50 pm news became part of a new 40-minute magazine programme called Newsbeat, which featured a greater emphasis on off-beat regional stories and satire. Newsbeat was quickly reduced to 30 minutes but remained in an early evening slot shortly after 6 pm. By 1967, the early evening bulletin reverted to a separate programme.

Newsbeat was broadcast for the final time on 11 June 1971 with News returned to its original 6 pm slot but reduced to a short five-minute bulletin. The early evening bulletin expanded to 15 minutes in October 1972 and change timeslots on several occasions to suit various programming. In January 1975, RTÉ introduced a news summary for deaf and hard of hearing people to the early evening bulletin.

January 1980 saw the early evening news extended to a 25–40 minute slot, returned to 6 pm and relaunched as Newstime, incorporating more regional news coverage, alongside a regular Countryside feature and the deaf news summary. A separate early evening news at 5.45 pm was reintroduced in January 1987.

On Monday 3 October 1988, RTÉ launched its first hour-long news programme Six One News, a new format incorporating national, international and regional news as well as live interviews and sports coverage. The programme's first anchors were former political correspondent Seán Duignan and long-standing newsreader Eileen Dunne (replaced two years later by Anne Doyle).

Six One established its own place in Irish television and politics when the expected winner of the 1990 presidential election campaign, Tánaiste Brian Lenihan delivered what was universally accepted to be a disastrous live response to a crisis in his campaign. Seeking to deny that he had ever been part of unsuccessful efforts to force President Hillery to refuse a parliamentary dissolution in a way that would help Lenihan's party get back into power (claims he himself had made in an on-the-record taped interview recorded some months earlier), Lenihan tried to stare into the camera and told viewers that "on mature recollection" his earlier version was wrong and that he had made no phone calls to the presidential residence to put pressure on the President. The appearance on Six One effectively ended Lenihan's presidential campaign.

The programme is also considered to have ended the domestic political career of then Foreign Minister Gerry Collins. On 7 November 1991, in response to a leadership struggle in his party, an overly-emotional, tearful Collins pleaded with the man challenging for the leadership, Albert Reynolds, not to "wreck our party right down the centre" and "burst up government". Collins's own chances of leadership were perceived to have been destroyed by his overly-emotional performance.

In 1992, Duignan left his position as presenter to become government press secretary under Albert Reynolds. Éamonn Lawlor was appointed as his successor and remained until 1996, when he became a presenter of the current affairs programme Prime Time.

His replacement was Bryan Dobson, who had been presenting the One O'Clock News for several years. In 1997, Anne Doyle left to become presenter of the Nine O'Clock News. She was replaced by Una O'Hagan, who continued until 2005, she decided to concentrate on radio broadcasting and late night bulletins. A number of newsreaders partnered Dobson before Sharon Ní Bheoláin became permanent co-presenter.

In September 2017, it was announced that Dobson would leave his position as co-presenter. Following the announcement, it also became clear that Ní Bheoláin would also leave her position. Dobson left his position as on 25 October 2017 to move to early morning radio on Morning Ireland. Ní Bheoláin left her position in December 2017 to become a rotating presenter on the Nine O'Clock News.

On Monday 8 January 2018, Caitríona Perry and Keelin Shanley began presenting the programme for the first time, with minor formatting changes. This continued until Shanley took leave in mid-2019. Ray Kennedy frequently took her place and continued her job after she died in February 2020. David McCullagh took on Kennedy's role on Monday 31 August 2020, with Perry continuing to be co-anchor. In May 2023, Perry announced that she would be leaving RTÉ to take up a new international role with the BBC based in Washington. Sharon Tobin took on Perry's role on Monday 4 September 2023, with McCullagh continuing to be co-anchor.

In August 2025, it was announced that McCullagh would leave his position as co-presenter to move to RTÉ Radio 1 as the successor to Claire Byrne on Today With... in November. Ray Kennedy, Vivienne Traynor, Eileen Whelan, Karen Creed and Brian O'Donovan frequently took his place as rotating co-presenters. Tommy Meskill took on McCullagh's role in December 2025, with Tobin continuing to be co-anchor.

== Format ==
The programme usually begins with the two presenters in the middle of the studio welcoming the viewer to the programme and introducing the main headlines. The opening theme then plays and the programme is begun by one of the presenters. Either one of the co-presenters normally sits down at the desk, while the other stands over at a large screen and presents the main story from there.

After the first commercial break there is typically an interview with a person connected with the main news story. This interview often takes place in studio. This is followed by shorter, more off-beat, or regional reports. The final part of the programme includes a sports summary (with a separate presenter).

At weekends the programme is styled as RTÉ News and Sport and lasts for half an hour. The programme features a single presenter and greater emphasis is given to sports news.

The programme is usually reduced to a half hour news bulletin for the month of August.

== Naming ==
Since 1950, RTÉ has broadcast a one-minute period of silence except for the ringing of a church bell linked to The Angelus, a Catholic prayer, at 12 pm and 6 pm. Though periodic calls have been made for its removal, a number of non-Catholic faiths, notably the Church of Ireland, have called for its continuation, regarding the minute as offering a chance for reflection amid a busy television schedule. (The broadcast no longer carries Catholic imagery, and instead focuses on images of people contemplating.) Because of this, the radio and television news bulletins start at 6.01 pm, hence the name.

Some critics have campaigned to abolish the Angelus on RTÉ, sometimes in newspaper letters pages, despite the Angelus at 6 pm being one of RTÉ's most popular television programmes and is Ireland's most-watched religious programme with an average of 433,000 viewers per day. It is unknown if RTÉ would move its bulletin back one minute to 6 pm when the programme would compete for viewers at the same time as other stations.

== Presenters ==
=== Current ===
Presenter	Role	Years
Sharon Tobin	Co-presenter	2023–present
Tommy Meskill	Co-presenter	2025–present
Ray Kennedy	Relief presenter/Weekend	
Eileen Whelan	Weekend/Relief presenter	2000–present
Kate Egan	Weekend/weekday presenter	2008–present
Vivienne Traynor	Relief presenter	
Karen Creed	Relief presenter	
Brian O'Donovan	Relief presenter	2025–present
Jamie Campbell	Relief presenter/Weekend presenter	2025–present
Maggie Doyle	Relief presenter	2026–present
Sharon Lynch	Relief presenter	2026–present
Christopher McKevitt
Samantha Libreri

=== Former presenters ===
Presenter	Years	Other roles
Eileen Dunne	1980–2022	RTÉ News: Nine O'Clock presenter
Niall Carroll	1999–2009	RTÉ Lyric FM presenter
Anne Doyle	1990–1997	Former RTÉ News Nine O' Clock presenter
Seán Duignan	1988–1992	The Week in Politics presenter
Jimmy Greeley	1990–1992	
Ken Hammond	1990–2009	
Éamonn Lawlor	1992–1996	Prime Time presenter
Michael Murphy	1994–2006	
Colm Murray	1992–2013	
Gareth O'Connor	1994–2011	
Siún Nic Gearailt	2006–2013	Nuacht RTÉ presenter
John Finnerty	1992–2017	
Bryan Dobson	1996–2017	Morning Ireland presenter
Sharon Ní Bheoláin	2005–2017	RTÉ News: Nine O'Clock presenter
Una O'Hagan	1997–2018	
Aengus Mac Grianna	1993–2018	
Keelin Shanley	2018–2020	
Caitríona Perry	2018–2023	BBC News presenter
David McCullagh	2020–2025	Today with... presenter

== See also ==
- RTÉ News on Two
- The Man Who Slipped on the Ice
- "We Are Armed with Allahu Akbar": stemming from the Iranian Revolution of 1979, the IRIB in Iran airs the religious and patriotic chant every night at 7 pm IRST (UTC+3:30), right before the start of its evening news bulletin on TV1 and IRINN. The key difference is that RTÉ's broadcast of Angelus is technically separate from the Six One news, while the "We Are Armed with Allahu Akbar" song and its accompanying video sequence are incorporated into the title sequence of IRIB's 7 pm news bulletin.
