= Anne Doyle =

Irish journalist, presenter and former newsreader

- Born: Anne Catherine Doyle; 30 January 1952 (age 74); Ferns, County Wexford, Ireland
- Education: University College Dublin
- Occupations: Journalist; Presenter; Newsreader
- Years active: 1978–2011
- Notable credit: RTÉ News
- Partner: Dan McGrattan (2000–present)

Anne Catherine Doyle (born 30 January 1952) is an Irish journalist, presenter and former newsreader. She is best known as a long-serving newsreader for RTÉ, who anchored the broadcaster's main evening television news programmes, during her 33 years of service.

== Early life ==
Born in Ferns, County Wexford. Doyle was the youngest in a family of five boys and two girls. Her father, John Doyle (1903–1975), worked most of his life as a farm labourer, while her mother was the former Elizabeth Kavanagh (1916–1979). Doyle was educated at the Loreto Convent in nearby Gorey and later at University College Dublin, where she was conferred with a Bachelor of Arts in English and History before later completing a postgraduate diploma in education.

== Career ==
=== Early career ===
Doyle spent a year as an English and History teacher but later pursued her interest in books and became a librarian. She later joined the Department of Foreign Affairs as an executive officer in the consular service.

=== Broadcasting ===
Doyle joined the RTÉ newsroom in 1978 and read her first news bulletin on Christmas Day that year. She became a regular reader for bulletins on both radio and television news services. In 1983, she became one of four presenters for RTÉ One's early evening news, then known as Newstime. The program was relaunched in 1988 as the Six One News with Doyle becoming co-anchor alongside Seán Duignan two years later. In 1992, Doyle was briefly suspended by RTÉ for refusing to cross picket lines during a technicians' strike.

Doyle became one of two sole anchors of RTÉ's flagship Nine O'Clock News in 1997, alternating with Eileen Dunne. In 2000, she was elected to represent RTÉ staff on the 14th RTÉ Authority. The following year, she took over from Marian Finucane as co-presenter of Crimeline. In addition, she filled in for Finucane as presenter of RTÉ Radio 1's The Marian Finucane Show.

In November 2011, Doyle announced she was seeking early retirement from RTÉ and had applied for a redundancy package. She presented her last RTÉ News bulletin at 8:50pm on Sunday 25 December 2011, 33 years to the day since her first bulletin. The bulletin ended with a montage of Doyle's career with RTÉ featuring tributes from among others, Taoiseach Enda Kenny and broadcaster Gay Byrne. She has said that, following her broadcasting work, she wishes to study law and enter the legal profession.

== In popular culture ==
Doyle has become part of Irish popular culture. Puppets Podge and Rodge frequently reference Doyle in their jokes, and the satirical comedy Bull Island also featured impersonations of Anne Doyle, including parodied news bulletins in which she would state "I am Anne Doyle. I am the news". She also has a long-standing association with Dustin the Turkey.

== Stamp ==
Marking RTÉ's 50th anniversary in 2011, Doyle became the first Wexford person to appear on a postage stamp during her own lifetime.

== Personal life ==
Following a 17-year relationship with an electrician which ended in August 1996, Doyle had a much publicised relationship with Jim McDaid (later Minister for Tourism, Sport and Recreation). She met McDaid at a function in New York in late 1997, and the relationship ended acrimoniously after about six months.

She has been in a relationship with restaurant owner, Dan McGrattan, since the beginning of the 2000s.

In February 2012, she came fifth in a poll to find Ireland's most desirable Valentines.
