= Brian Daly =

Irish news journalist

- Occupation: News journalist
- Employer(s): Sky News, TV3

Brian Daly is an Irish news journalist. He previously worked for TV3 News. and also worked as Ireland Correspondent for Sky News in Dublin. Daly was one of the two anchors for Sky News Ireland's twice-weeknightly programmes alongside colleague Ray Kennedy, following the departure of previous Sky News Ireland anchor Gráinne Seoige.

Daly joined Sky News from Irish channel TV3, where he had worked since its launch in 1998 and anchored the breakfast show Ireland AM. Prior to presenting on TV3, he worked on different radio stations within the Republic of Ireland.

He rejoined TV3 in 2008 after four years with Sky.
