= Eileen Dunne =

Irish newscaster and radio presenter (born 1958)

- Born: 28 April 1958 (age 68); Dublin, Ireland
- Education: University College Dublin
- Occupations: Journalist; Broadcast presenter
- Years active: 1980–2022
- Employer: RTÉ
- Notable credits: RTÉ News and Current Affairs; RTÉ lyric fm
- Spouse: Macdara Ó Fátharta (m. 1993)
- Children: 1

Eileen Dunne (born 28 April 1958) is an Irish retired journalist, newsreader and presenter with RTÉ, Ireland's national radio and television station, where she presented the main television news programmes Six One News, Nine O'Clock News and One O'Clock News including all other news bulletins on both radio and television from 1980 to 2022. She was the co-anchor alongside Sharon Ní Bheoláin of RTÉ's flagship Nine O'Clock News and presented afternoon bulletins for RTÉ Radio 1.

== Early life ==
Dunne was born in Dublin. Her father was the RTÉ journalist, presenter and commentator, Mick Dunne, a native of Clonaslee, County Laois. She attended secondary school at Manor House School, Raheny. She studied Arts at University College Dublin.

== Career ==
Dunne joined RTÉ in 1980 as a part-time radio announcer. She continued her teaching duties, while working part-time as a radio continuity announcer on RTÉ Radio 1. She began presenting television news bulletins in 1984.

In addition to her news work, Dunne also presented the religious affairs programme The God Slot for RTÉ Radio 1 on Friday nights, having previously presented Eileen Dunne's Classic Melodies for RTÉ lyric fm until 2010. She was International President of the Association of European Journalists (2010–2014).

Dunne was the spokesperson giving the results of the Irish jury (and televote in 1998) in the Eurovision Song Contest between 1989 and 1998.

Dunne regularly featured on RTÉ coverage of major state occasions. In 2016, she was co-anchor with Bryan Dobson for the official state commemoration of the centenary of the 1916 Rising. She provided the RTÉ television commentary on the state funerals of Garret FitzGerald (2011) and Albert Reynolds (2014) and the state commemoration of the Battle of the Somme (2016). Dunne also presented the coverage of Pope Francis's visit to Knock Shrine in 2018.

She presented news programmes from the UK on the State Visit of President Higgins there in 2014, from Dublin Castle and Croke Park during Queen Elizabeth's state visit to Ireland in 2011 and from Ballybunion during the then U.S. President Bill Clinton's visit to Ireland in 1998. She also presented from Rome on the inauguration of Pope Benedict in 2005 and his resignation in 2013 and from Blacksod Bay, Mayo on the day of the R116 Air Crash in 2017. Other major live news specials she presented include the 2000 Concorde crash on 25 July of that year, the result of the 2005 papal conclave on 19 April of that year, the IRA announcement that it was ending its armed campaign in Northern Ireland on 28 July 2005, the Green Party pulling out of government on 23 January 2011, and the arrival of the then U.S. President Trump in Ireland on 5 June 2019.

Dunne's final bulletin aired on 18 November 2022, after 42 years working for RTÉ.

In December 2023, Dunne was announced as one of the eleven celebrities taking part in the seventh season of Dancing with the Stars.

== Personal life ==
She is married to the actor Macdara Ó Fátharta since 1993; he plays the part of the villain Tadhg in the Irish language TG4 drama, Ros na Rún. They have one son, Cormac.
