= Donal Kelly =

Irish journalist (1938–2025)

- Born: 1938; Buncrana, County Donegal, Ireland
- Died: 3 January 2025 (aged 86); Glenageary, County Dublin, Ireland
- Occupations: Journalist; broadcaster
- Employers: Irish Press; RTÉ News
- Spouse: Ann Kelly
- Children: 2

Donal Kelly (1938 – 3 January 2025) was an Irish journalist and broadcaster, best known for his work with RTÉ News.

== Life and career ==
Kelly began his journalism career with the Donegal People's Press before later joining the Irish Press. He joined RTÉ in 1968. During his career, Kelly covered the conflict in Northern Ireland throughout the 1970s and 1980s as well as various international events. He succeeded Seán Duignan as RTÉ's political correspondent in 1988, later becoming political editor. In this role, Kelly covered several general election campaigns, as well as state visits by Nelson Mandela and Mikhail Gorbachev. He was one of the first presenters of The Week in Politics. Kelly retired in 2002.

Kelly died on 3 January 2025, at the age of 86.
