= RTÉ News: One O'Clock =

Irish television news programme

- Also known as: Lunchtime News
- Genre: News
- Created by: RTÉ News
- Presented by: Eileen Whelan; Ray Kennedy
- Country of origin: Ireland
- Original languages: English, Irish

Production
- Production locations: Studio 3, RTÉ Television Centre, Donnybrook, Dublin 4
- Camera setup: Multi-camera
- Running time: 25 minutes (Weekday); 10 minutes (Weekend)

Original release
- Network: RTÉ One; RTÉ News channel
- Release: 16 October 1989 – present

Related
- RTÉ News: Six One; RTÉ News: Nine O'Clock

RTÉ News: One O'Clock is RTÉ's afternoon news programme broadcast on Irish television channels RTÉ One and RTÉ News at 1:00pm. The bulletin airs until 1:25pm every Monday to Friday and until 1:10pm every Saturday and Sunday. It is presented by Eileen Whelan on weekdays and Ray Kennedy on weekends and produced by RTÉ News and Current Affairs.

== History ==
On-screen logo 2009

The News at One launched on 16 October 1989 together with an extended daytime television service on RTÉ 1. The original presenter was Éamonn Lawlor, who had returned to Ireland after ten years as Europe correspondent for RTÉ News. A unified look across all RTÉ news output was immediately introduced with the News at One using the same theme music, opening titles and promos as the early evening Six One bulletin.

The One O'Clock News is usually presented by either Ray Kennedy and Eileen Whelan. Relief presenters include Mary Calpin, Sharon Tobin, Kate Egan, Vivienne Traynor, Carla O'Brien and Caitríona Perry. The programme is shorter than other RTÉ News bulletins, running for about 25 minutes. During the summer months of late July and for all of August the programme is reduced in length to just under 15 minutes in duration.

Until 2009, RTÉ broadcast a short Irish language news summary Cinnlinte Nuachta following RTÉ News: One O'Clock. This broadcast was discontinued in 2009 following Nuacht RTÉ's move from Montrose to Baile na hAbhann, County Galway. RTÉ now broadcasts a business news update as part of the RTÉ News: One O'Clock bulletin in its place.

As of 2019, the programme is the first RTÉ TV News of the day on RTÉ TV. The first morning news on TV airs on the RTÉ News channel and is a simulcast of Morning Ireland from RTÉ Radio 1.

== Presenters ==
- Current

Presenter	Role
Eileen Whelan	Weekday anchor
Ray Kennedy	Weekend anchor
Jamie Campbell	Relief presenter
Sharon Tobin	Relief presenter
Karen Creed	Relief presenter
Kate Egan	Relief presenter
Carla O'Brien	Relief presenter
Brian O'Donovan	Relief presenter
Maggie Doyle	Relief presenter
Christopher McKevitt
Samantha Libreri

=== Former presenters ===
Presenter	Years	Other roles
Éamonn Lawlor	1989–1990	Former Six One presenters
Bryan Dobson	1990–1992	Former Six One presenters
Caitríona Perry	2018–2023	Former Six One presenters
Eileen Dunne	2011–2022	Former Nine O Clock presenter
