= Carla O'Brien (journalist) =

Irish journalist and dancer

- Born: Carla O'Brien; 5 October 1983 (age 42); Caledon, County Tyrone, Northern Ireland
- Education: Queen's University Belfast; NUI Galway
- Occupations: News presenter; multimedia journalist; Irish dancer
- Years active: 2005–present
- Employer: RTÉ
- Notable credits: RTÉ News: One O'Clock; RTÉ News: Six One; news2day; Newsfeed
- Spouse: Ronan Glynn
- Children: 2

Carla O'Brien (born 5 October 1983) is an Irish television presenter and multimedia journalist, working with RTÉ, Ireland's national radio and television service, where she has presented Crimecall since September 2023. She previously presented RTÉ's news2day from 2012 to 2014 and Newsfeed from 2014 to 2017, as well as the Six One News, Nine O'Clock News and One O'Clock News. In her career as a dancer, she was Irish and world champion in Irish dancing, and for some years principal dancer with Riverdance.

== Early life ==
O'Brien grew up on a farm near the village of Caledon in the south-east of County Tyrone, and has two sisters and one brother. The youngest of four, she was active in Irish dancing from the age of 5. After secondary school, O'Brien attended Queen's University Belfast, where she received a Master of Science degree in management information systems and services.

== Career ==
In 2005 O'Brien won the Irish dancing championship titles of Ulster, Ireland, Great Britain and the world. Then in September 2005 she took on a role as the lead female dancer for Riverdance. Starting with Japan, she also danced for a year in America and a year in Europe, finishing in 2008 back in Japan. She then moved to work as a financial analyst on a graduate programme with the management consulting part of Deloitte, from August 2008 to December 2009.

In 2010, O'Brien worked on the An Jig Gig Irish dancing TV programme with TG4. In January 2011, she wrote a piece for the Galway City Tribune on the growing popularity of sean-nós Irish dancing. She joined Raidió Teilifís Éireann (RTÉ) in May 2011, and worked as a researcher on RTÉ's News at One. She presented RTÉ's news2day from 2011 to 2014, before presenting Newsfeed from September 2014 to 2017.

In September 2023, she became the new presenter of Crimecall.

== Personal life ==
O'Brien became the Tyrone Rose in 2010, competing for one of six places from the island of Ireland. She secured a place at NUI Galway to pursue a Master of Arts degree in journalism from September 2010, graduating with First Class Honours, and winning an award for the highest marks in the broadcasting part of her course.

In September 2013, O'Brien married Ronan Glynn, who had a friend on the Riverdance staff; he was Deputy Chief Medical Officer of Ireland from 2018 to 2022. They have two children. As of 2015, they lived in Smithfield, Dublin.
