= Leader's Questions (TV programme) =

- Genre: News and Current Affairs
- Presented by: Sharon Ní Bheoláin
- Country of origin: Ireland
- Original languages: English; Irish

Production
- Production location: RTÉ Television Centre
- Camera setup: Multi-camera
- Running time: Approximately 60 minutes

Original release
- Network: RTÉ One; RTÉ News channel

Related
- RTÉ News; Morning Edition

Leader's Questions is an Irish TV programme broadcast on RTÉ One and RTÉ News channel. It is produced by RTÉ News and Current Affairs, edited by Joe Mag Raollaigh and is presented by Sharon Ní Bheoláin. Political correspondents Micheál Lehane and Paul Cunningham also present from time to time.

The programme airs every Wednesday and Thursday at around 11:45 during the Dáil term and broadcasts live proceedings from Leinster House of questions posed by opposition leaders in parliament to the Taoiseach and the Tánaiste. The programme is on air for around 60 minutes. Before and after Dáil proceedings the presenter chairs discussion and analysis with political and media figures.

| Presenter | Role | Years | Other roles |
|---|---|---|---|
| Sharon Ní Bheoláin | Main achor | 2018–present | Nine O’ Clock presenter |
| Micheál Lehane | Relief anchor | | RTÉ News Reporter |
| Paul Cunningham | Relief anchor | | RTÉ News Reporter |
