= John Kilraine =

Irish journalist

- Born: John Kilraine; 1959 or 1960 (age 65–66); London, England
- Education: Trinity College Dublin; Dublin City University
- Occupation: Journalist
- Years active: 2003–present
- Notable credit(s): Nationwide; RTÉ News; TV3; 98FM; Sunday Independent; The Irish Press

John Kilraine (born 1959/1960) is an Irish journalist for RTÉ News, where he has been a reporter for Nationwide since 2024. He previously was the RTÉ London correspondent from April 2022 to May 2024 and Dublin correspondent from November 2011 to April 2022.

== Career ==
Prior to his RTÉ career, Kilraine worked as a journalist for TV3, Dublin's 98FM, Sunday Independent and The Irish Press.

He joined RTÉ in July 2003 and reported extensively on the Mahon Tribunal. He also reported on the visit of President Michael D. Higgins to Peru, Colombia and Cuba in 2017 as a video journalist.

On 8 January 2010, Kilraine's report for the Six One News capturing a male pedestrian slipping on ice in Dublin near the Four Courts went on to go viral online. On 7 January 2020, ten years later, Coors Light erected a plaque in commemoration at the location of the incident, which read: "In honour of 'The guy who slipped on the ice' on RTÉ News January 8th 2010, your memory lives on."

In January 2018, Kilraine lodged a legal action against trade union official and anti-homelessness campaigner Brendan Ogle over comments he made during the occupation of Apollo House. Kilraine, who reported for RTÉ News in January 2017, claimed Ogle defamed him in a Facebook post by questioning his and RTÉ's objectivity and impartiality. RTÉ criticised Ogle's "personal attacks" on its staff at the time, saying it stood by its reporting as "fair and accurate".

Kilraine was appointed as London correspondent with RTÉ News in April 2022, succeeding Sean Whelan. He previously held the role of Dublin correspondent for over 15 years, reporting in particular the capital's homeless and housing crisis.

In May 2024, RTÉ confirmed Kilraine's contract as London correspondent had ended and would return to its Irish newsroom having served an initial two years. He began reporting for RTÉ's Nationwide programme later that year.

== Personal life ==
Kilraine was born in London, England. He grew up in Dublin and is a graduate of Trinity College Dublin with an honours degree in English and History and holds a postgraduate diploma in journalism from Dublin City University.

In December 2014, Kilraine was the victim of an aggravated burglary at his home.

Media offices
Preceded by Sean Whelan	RTÉ News London Correspondent; 2022–2024	Succeeded by Tommy Meskill
