= Morning Edition (Irish TV programme) =

- Genre: News; Current affairs
- Presented by: Keelin Shanley Anthony Murnane
- Country of origin: Ireland
- Original languages: English; Irish

Production
- Production location: RTÉ Television Centre
- Editor: Anthony Murnane
- Camera setup: Multi-camera
- Running time: 120 minutes

Original release
- Network: RTÉ One; RTÉ News Now
- Release: 28 January 2013 – 28 November 2014

Related
- RTÉ News

RTÉ Morning Edition is an Irish news television programme that was broadcast on RTÉ One and RTÉ News Now from 28 January 2013 to 28 November 2014. The programme was presented by Keelin Shanley and Anthony Murnane. It was produced by RTÉ News and Current Affairs.

== Format ==
The programme aired every Monday to Friday from 09:00 to 11:00 and provided a live morning mix of news, sport, business, topical discussion and entertainment. The show was a success upon its launch. The first show started at 09:00 on 28 January 2013 and the first season ran until May 2013. The show returned for a second season on 2 September 2013. The programme's biggest competitor was TV3's Ireland AM.

== Programming ==
The programme launched on 28 January 2013. The programme received some criticism from its launch as RTÉ does not provide any breakfast television programme with many believing the programme airs too late in the morning.

== Cancellation ==
On 5 November 2014, it was announced that the show was cancelled, and would not be returning in January 2015 after its 2-year run. The final programme was broadcast on 28 November 2014.
