= Sky News Ireland =

Defunct Irish news channel run by Sky News

- Presented by: Gráinne Seoige; Ray Kennedy; Brian Daly
- Country of origin: Ireland
- Original language: English

Production
- Production location: Dublin
- Running time: 30 minutes
- Production company: Sky Ireland

Original release
- Network: Irish feed of Sky News
- Release: 24 May 2004 – 3 November 2006

Sky News Ireland is a former programming block on Sky News, broadcast in Ireland. It was a separate feed from the UK and international versions of Sky News. Sky News Ireland was broadcast from its studios in Dublin. The service was also available in the UK and around the world on the Sky News Active (Red Button) service.

== Background ==
Sky News launched in Europe in February 1989. In May 2004, Sky News confirmed the launch of an Irish version of the channel; prior to this, Sky News was broadcast in Ireland with specific opt-out advertising and sponsorship. Specialised Irish news content aired for 30 minutes each night from 19:00 and 22:00. These special broadcasts were presented by Gráinne Seoige, news anchor Ray Kennedy and Brian Daly. On 24 October 2005, the 19:00 programme was moved to 18:30, this put it in direct competition with RTÉ News: Six One.

The bulletin was also available to international viewers via the Sky News Active service (red button) which proved quite popular with the Irish diaspora abroad. The channel was available to European viewers with a DVB-S satellite receiver. Sky News Ireland was the first Irish news service to be broadcast in widescreen, beating plans by RTÉ News and TV3 News. On 27 December 2005, it was confirmed Sky News Ireland's 18:30 bulletin was to be simulcast on the Irish feed of Sky One from 9 January 2006.

Reporters for the service included Tadhg Enright, Jonathan Healy, Alison O'Reilly, Orla Chennnaoui, David Blevins, Eibhlín Ní Chonghaile, Geraldine Lynagh, Amanda Cassidy, Aisling Ni Choisdealbha and John Sherwin. Weather on Sky News Ireland was usually presented by Lisa Burke.

In October 2006, according to Neilsen, ratings for the 22:00 programme were an average of 135,000 viewers, 18:30 programme averaging 65,000 viewers. However, The Guardian reported that viewing figures for the first half of 2006 were much lower, at just 6,000 for the early-evening bulletin and 17,000 for the late broadcast.

== Closure ==
On 31 October 2006, it was reported that the programme block would cease at the end of November 2006. After 3 November 2006, no further Sky News Ireland bulletins were broadcast. Ray Kennedy presented the final programme at 22:00 on 3 November, after which the staff left in protest at the handling of the closure by their British Sky News managers in London.

Although specific Irish programming ended, Sky News continues to air an Irish opt-out advertising and sponsorship feed and continues to operate studios and offices in Dublin and Belfast.
