= Brenda Power =

Irish journalist, barrister and radio and television broadcaster

- Born: Kilkenny, Ireland
- Education: College of Commerce, Rathmines; King's Inns
- Occupations: Barrister; journalist; broadcaster
- Known for: Conservative views
- Television: Crimecall; Would You Believe
- Children: 5

Brenda Power (born 1962) is an Irish journalist, barrister and a radio and television broadcaster on RTÉ and Newstalk.

== Personal life ==
Power is the eldest daughter of Patrick and Rose Power of Ballynooney, Mullinavat, Kilkenny. She is separated and has five children. Brenda won the A.T. Cross Young journalist of the year award in the early 1980s. Power is a graduate of the College of Commerce, Rathmines, with a diploma in journalism. While working as a journalist, Power studied at the King's Inns and was called to the bar in 1996.

== Career ==
Power is a former presenter of Crimecall. Prior to this, she filled in for Marian Finucane and Joe Duffy on their respective radio shows. Power worked as a presenter/reporter on Would You Believe, on RTE 1 TV. She has also featured as a panelist in TV3's Midday Programme and RTE's Cutting Edge panel show. She also presented radio shows in the 2000s, including the phone-in programme Your Call on Newstalk, and The Brenda Power Show.

During the summer of 2006, Power stood in for George Hook on The Right Hook on Newstalk. She has also worked for The Irish Press group writing The People Column. She wrote for Magill and Image magazines, and as a columnist with The Sunday Times and the Irish Daily Mail. In 1996, Power qualified as a barrister, specialising in Common Law. Power also works as a media and public relations consultant. In 2010 she published, The Noughties: From Glitz to Gloom (Collins), about Ireland from the Celtic Tiger to crash and the Recession.

== Views and controversy ==
Power has been known for her Catholic and conservative viewpoints. For instance, she has written that '...all of the seven deadly sins have since been rebranded as lifestyle choices — envy is motivation, lust is polyamory, and sloth is me-time'. She has accused doctors allowing children under 16 access to abortion without their parent's consent of being guilty of assault. However she has adopted a moderate Pro-Choice position and revealed she voted "Yes" in the 2018 referendum to repeal the Eight Amendment to the Irish constitution while stating she opposes further liberalisation including the removal of the mandatory three-day wait for women seeking an abortion. Regarding suicide, Power has argued "failing to voice even the mildest social disapproval of suicide ... we may be making it too easy for troubled people to escape themselves and their responsibilities."

Power has voiced opposition to LGBT rights. She wrote in opposition to same-sex marriage in her Times Online column. She is highly critical of LGBT adoption ("I wouldn't like a child to be brought up by two men dressed all day in women's clothes, to be frank"), gay pride ("foolish and anachronistic"), and the Irish gay community, which she describes as "misogynistic". In addition, Power has compared gender dysphoria to eating disorders and other mental illnesses. She has stated her support for the decision of the English High Court in Bell v Tavistock (2020) regarding puberty blockers.

In 2015, she was criticised by Traveller advocacy group Pavee Point and the Irish Council for Civil Liberties for a column that accused Travellers of "beating their own cousins in family rows" and "torturing and murdering old folk and causing mayhem on school playgrounds". She was interviewed by the gardaí, but the Director of Public Prosecutions declined to pursue legal action, a result Power claimed was a victory for free speech. She compared herself to Charlie Hebdo. Her views on Muslim immigration to Europe, which Power claims would reduce the freedoms of Western women, drew criticism from a number of prominent members of Ireland's Muslim community, including Umar Al-Qadri. Additionally she has voiced strong opposition to proposals aimed at accommodating Muslim students in primary and secondary schools.
