= Vivienne Traynor =

Irish journalist and presenter (born 1971)

- Born: 1971 (age 54–55); Skerries, County Dublin
- Occupations: Journalist and news presenter
- Employer: RTÉ
- Notable credit(s): RTÉ News: One O'Clock; RTÉ News: Six One
- Spouse: Justin Treacy
- Children: 4

Vivienne Traynor (born 1971) is an Irish journalist and presenter with RTÉ, where she has been a relief presenter for the One O'Clock News, Six One News and Nine O'Clock News. She is the courts reporter for RTÉ.

== Personal life ==
Traynor is from Skerries, County Dublin, Ireland. She is married to sports anchor Justin Treacy and has four children. In 2009, she donated a kidney to her nephew, something she discussed in an October 2009 interview on The Late Late Show. On 14 June 2013, she won a Justice Media Award in the "Court Reporting for Broadcast Media" category for her work on the Marie Fleming assisted suicide case.
