= Liffey Champion =

Weekly newspaper of north County Kildare and west Dublin, Ireland

- Type: Weekly newspaper
- Format: Tabloid
- Founded: 17 May 1991
- Language: English
- Headquarters: Mill Lane, Leixlip
- City: Leixlip
- Country: Ireland
- Circulation: 7,500
- ISSN: 1649-5756

The Liffey Champion is a local newspaper for north County Kildare and the Lucan area of west Dublin in Ireland. It is based in Leixlip. The first edition was printed on 17 May 1991.

Published weekly every Thursday, the paper is in a tabloid format, and varies in length, averaging about 48 pages long, with approximately half of its pages being printed in full colour. The paper is currently priced at €1.90.

The paper also provides coverage of local news, major events and sport, including Gaelic football, hurling and rugby. Its journalists cover local authority meetings of South Dublin County Council and Kildare County Council, along with local court proceedings in Kilcock and Naas, and various meetings in the local communities. Several of the newspaper's journalists have gone on to take up positions in national and international media. For example, former Champion journalist Sharon Tobin later worked as a news reporter for TV3 and RTÉ News.

The newspaper is not a member of the Audit Bureau of Circulations Irish division, and as such, no official circulation figures exist. As of early 2007, the publisher supplied figures of 7,500.
