= Crimecall =

- 2017 Poster
- Also known as: Garda Patrol; Crimeline
- Genre: Factual
- Based on: Aktenzeichen XY… ungelöst
- Presented by: Carla O'Brien
- Country of origin: Ireland
- Original languages: English, Irish

Production
- Production locations: Dublin, Ireland
- Running time: 15 minutes (Garda Patrol); 60 minutes
- Production companies: Green Ink; 360 Production South

Original release
- Network: RTÉ One
- Release: 28 October 1964 – present

Related
- Crimewatch

Crimecall is a television show broadcast once monthly on RTÉ. It is co-produced in Dublin, Ireland, by Green Ink Ltd and 360 Production South Ltd. Since September 2023, the show has been presented by journalist Carla O'Brien. It is a second RTÉ adaptation of German crime programme Aktenzeichen XY… ungelöst, and its format matches that of its British derivative Crimewatch and re-enacts unsolved crimes.

The Garda Bureau of Community Engagement is responsible for Crimecall.

== History ==
On 28 October 1964, RTÉ began broadcasting Garda Patrol, a fifteen-minute weekly television show seeking public assistance in solving crimes. The show was later revamped in 1992 (this was closely modelled on BBC's Crimewatch UK), and retitled Crimeline. Broadcast once a month, it was originally presented by David Harvey and Marian Finucane and produced by Midas Productions. Following Finucane's departure in November 2000, she was replaced by Anne Doyle in January 2001. This version of the show was axed in October 2003 after eleven years on air. Since September 2004, the show has been known as Crimecall.

== Presenters ==
The show has had many presenters over the years including:

=== Crimeline (1992–2003) ===
- Marian Finucane (–2000)
- David Harvey
- Anne Doyle (2001–2003)

=== Crimecall (2004–present) ===
- Brenda Power (2004–2006)
- Dáithí Ó Sé (2004–2005)
- Anne Cassin (2006–2011)
- Con Murphy (2006–2011)
- Grainne Seoige (2011–2016)
- Philip Boucher-Hayes (2011–2016)
- Keelin Shanley (2016–2017)
- Sharon Ní Bheoláin (2018–2023)
- Carla O'Brien (2023–present)
