= Sharon Ní Bheoláin =

Irish journalist, newsreader, and presenter

- Born: Sharon Boland; 15 February 1971 (age 55); Malahide, Dublin, Ireland
- Education: Trinity College Dublin
- Occupations: Newsreader; Journalist
- Employer: RTÉ
- Notable credit(s): Nuacht RTÉ; RTÉ News: One O'Clock; RTÉ News: Six One; RTÉ News: Nine O'Clock; Leaders' Questions; Crimecall
- Spouse: Kevin Cantrell (m. 1999; div. 2005)
- Partner: Finbarr Heslin
- Children: 1

Sharon Ní Bheoláin (Irish: [n̠ʲiː ˈvʲoːlˠaːnʲ], approximately nee VYOH-lawn; born Boland on 15 February 1971) is an Irish journalist, newsreader, and presenter with RTÉ, Ireland's national radio and television broadcaster, where she has presented the Nine O'Clock News since 2018. She has presented many flagship programmes including Crimecall, Nuacht RTÉ, One O'Clock News, and Six One News, as well as all other news bulletins on both radio and television.

== Early life and education ==
Sharon Boland was born in Ayrefield, County Dublin, on 15 February 1971. Her family moved to Malahide in 1980. Though not a native Irish speaker, she graduated from Trinity College Dublin (TCD) with a Bachelor of Arts honours degree in early and modern Irish in 1992.

== Career ==
Before joining RTÉ, she worked for the Dublin radio station, Raidió Na Life.

Ní Bheoláin began her career with RTÉ in 1994, presenting Nuacht RTÉ and in 1997, she became the presenter of News 2. Throughout the early 2000s, she had sporadic appearances on various RTÉ News programmes, including the Six One News, the Nine O'Clock News and on RTÉ Two's news programmes. In 2005, she became permanent co-presenter of the Six One News, alongside Bryan Dobson. In December 2017, Ní Bheoláin announced that she would be leaving Six One News.

She also presented the short-run RTÉ series Turas Teanga, which helped viewers learn the Irish language.

In 2018, she became the anchor of the Nine O'Clock News, sharing presenting duties with Eileen Dunne, while it was also announced that she would present Crimecall every month along with presenting Leaders' Questions every Wednesday and Thursday morning during the Dáil term.

On September 20, 2026 she replaced by Aine Lawlor as presenter of The Week in Politics.

== Personal life ==
Ní Bheoláin married cameraman Kevin Cantrell in 1999, settling in Clontarf; they have one daughter. They split up in 2005. Her partner since 2009 is vet Finbarr Heslin.

In 2014, she was the victim of two online stalkers.
