= Sharon Tobin =

Irish journalist and newsreader

- Born: 11 October 1979 (age 46); Castleknock, County Dublin, Ireland
- Education: Ballyfermot College of Further Education
- Occupations: Journalist, newsreader
- Years active: 2000–present
- Notable credit(s): East Coast FM; TV3 News; RTÉ News
- Spouse: Paul Dunne (m. 2008–2017)

Sharon Tobin (born 11 October 1979) is an Irish journalist and newsreader working for RTÉ, Ireland's national radio and television station, where she has co-presented the Six One News since September 2023. She has also presented the One O'Clock News and Nine O'Clock News.

== Career ==
After completing the Leaving Certificate and a brief stint at the Institute of Education, Tobin attained a Higher National Diploma (HND) in radio production and journalism and a media production management degree from Ballyfermot College of Further Education, then known as Ballyfermot Senior College. Upon graduation, she landed her first job with East Coast FM in Bray, County Wicklow and later worked for the Liffey Champion and Show Business Weekly. She also worked at a community radio station in west Dublin, presenting and working on the news.

Tobin went on to work at TV3 News, where she focused on international news and was also a newsreader, before moving to RTÉ News in July 2008 as a journalist.

Tobin was named as one of four presenters to host Monday Night Live, a new eight-part current affairs panel series on RTÉ One, in September 2022.

In September 2023, Tobin took over as co-anchor of the RTÉ News: Six One alongside David McCullagh.

== Personal life ==
Tobin married music industry worker Paul Dunne in 2008. They have two children, a son and daughter. The couple split in 2017. Tobin resides in Mullingar, County Westmeath.
