= Bryan Dobson =

Irish journalist and newscaster

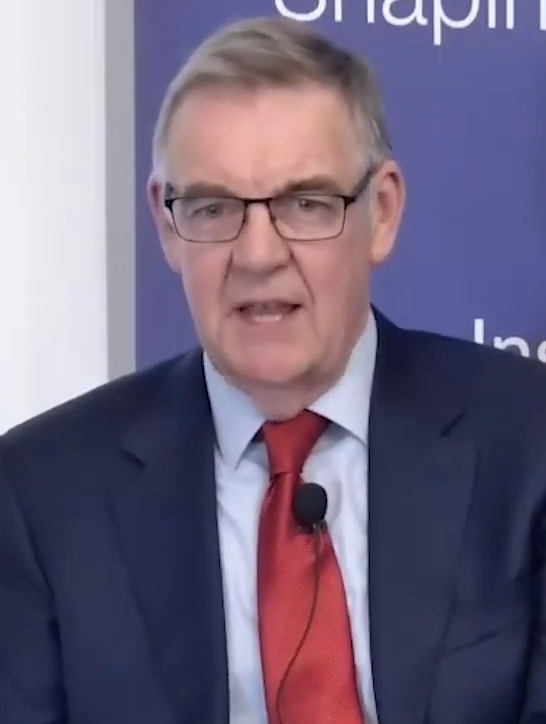
- Dobson in 2025
- Born: Bryan David Dobson; 10 February 1960 (age 66); Sandymount, Dublin, Ireland
- Other name: Dobbo
- Education: Rathmines College of Commerce; Dublin Institute of Technology
- Occupations: Journalist; news presenter; presenter
- Employer: Raidió Teilifís Éireann (RTÉ) (formerly)
- Notable credits: RTÉ News: Nine O'Clock; RTÉ News: Six One; RTÉ News: One O'Clock; RTÉ News and Current Affairs; RTÉ News at One
- Spouse: Crea Dobson (m. 1994)
- Children: 2

Bryan David Dobson (born 10 February 1960) is an Irish journalist, now retired, a newscaster and presenter who worked for RTÉ. He presented the RTÉ News at One on RTÉ Radio One, RTÉ News: Six One, RTÉ News: Nine O'Clock, most recently Morning Ireland, and occasionally RTÉ News: One O'Clock.

== Early life ==
Dobson was raised in Sandymount in a Church of Ireland family. He attended Newpark Comprehensive School, Blackrock, Dublin. It was one of the first schools to introduce the Transition Year programme. In it, he presented a half-hour radio programme. When he finished school, he attended a media course in the Rathmines College of Commerce, Dublin Institute of Technology.

== Broadcasting career ==
=== Early career ===
Dobson previously worked for the Dublin pirate station Radio Nova, hosting their nightly Dublin Today programme. Before joining RTÉ, he worked for BBC Northern Ireland.

=== RTÉ ===
Dobson joined RTÉ in 1987 as a reporter for This Week on Radio 1. He was later appointed as business correspondent, before joining RTÉ News as a presenter in 1991. In September 1996 he was named as the co-presenter of the flagship early evening news programme, RTÉ News: Six One on RTÉ One, alongside Sharon Ní Bheoláin. He left his position as co-presenter on 25 October 2017 after 21 years to move to early morning radio on Morning Ireland.

He also presented various special programmes such as RTÉ's coverage of general elections. In May 2011 he fronted RTÉ television coverage of Queen Elizabeth II's visit to the Republic of Ireland.

On 24 January 2024 Dobson announced his retirement from broadcasting having worked for RTÉ for 37 years. He presented his last show on 3 May 2024.

== Controversy ==
In 2003, Dobson became embroiled in a minor controversy. Dobson was accused of a conflict of interest when it was reported that he had provided some training for senior local authority officials in answering questions in the media, although the controversy was somewhat defused when Dobson expressed regret for what was viewed as a misjudgment.

== Personal life ==
Dobson lives in Dublin with his wife Crea and their two children.
