= Carla O'Brien (artist) =

Australian artist

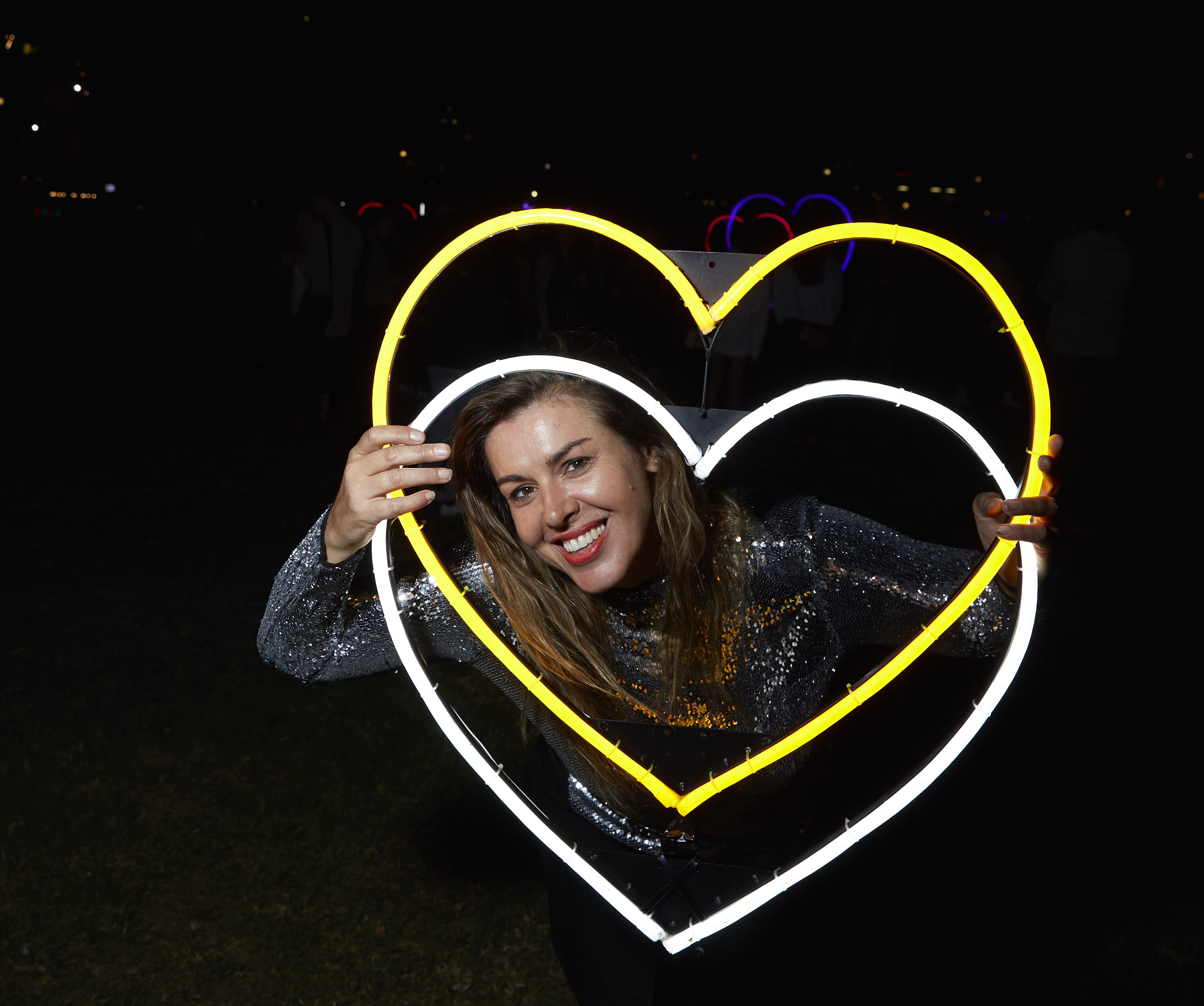
Carla O'Brien and her LED Hearts – White Night 2017

Carla O'Brien is a visual artist based in Melbourne, Australia. Her primary medium is LED neon flex. Her installations have featured at events and festivals around the world, including Burning Man, the White Night Melbourne festival in 2015 and 2017, and White Night Ballarat in 2017.

Carla's "Neon Night Garden" exhibition was held QV Square in May/June 2017. The exhibition featured a series of new and classic neon installations and marks her largest exhibition to date.
