= Ray Kennedy (journalist) =

Irish news journalist (born 1970)

- Born: 1970 (age 55–56); Dublin, Ireland
- Education: BA (Ord) Law. BA (Hons) International Relations. Dip Journalism. Dip EU Law.
- Occupation: Journalist
- Employer: RTÉ
- Children: 2

Ray Kennedy is an Irish news presenter and award winning journalist working for RTÉ, Ireland's national television and radio station, where he has presented the Nine O'Clock News since September 2023, having previously presented the weekend editions of the Six One News and One O'Clock News.

He is former Ireland Correspondent for Sky News in Dublin and was also one of the Sky News Ireland's two anchors. for its weeknightly programmes.

== Career ==
Before joining Sky News, Kennedy worked as a reporter and news anchor for Irish channels RTÉ and TV3. His career began in 1989, working as a reporter with the Irish Independent and Irish Press newspaper groups before radio and television presenting.

He has held the posts of Political Correspondent with Independent Network News (INN). Weekend Anchor TV3, and Ireland Correspondent Sky News International.

In 2016, he won the Justice Media Award television journalist category for the coverage of the Gorse Hill repossession case. In 2017, he was shortlisted for the Amnesty International Media Awards for reporting on poverty in Brazil ahead of the Rio Olympics. In 2006, he was nominated one of Ireland's favourite news presenters at the TV Now Awards.

== Work ==
Overseas assignments have included the funeral of Princess Diana in 1997 and the war and refugee crisis in Kosovo 1999. He covered the 2004/05 Asian tsunami for Sky News live from Thailand, and was also dispatched to Rome by Sky for the death of Pope John Paul II and election of Pope Benedict XVI. In 2004, Ray Kennedy covered the US presidential election live from Washington, D.C.

He has spent time working from Sky News centre in London. He also broadcast from the Fox News studios in Washington DC with Brit Hume and John Gibson.

Ray Kennedy reporting from Rome for Sky News during election of new Pope, 2005

He provided three hours of live coverage on Sky News for the 1916 Easter Rising - 90th anniversary military parade in Dublin. He broadcast live commentary on Sky News international for the state funeral of former Taoiseach Charles Haughey.

He left Sky News in 2008 returning to RTÉ News.

On 19 September 2022, Kennedy was the presenter of RTÉ's coverage of the funeral of Queen Elizabeth II from London, along with Kate Egan.

In September 2023, he became the anchor of the Nine O'Clock News, sharing presenting duties with Sharon Ní Bheoláin.
