= Éamonn Lawlor =

Irish radio broadcaster

- Born: 1951 (age 74–75); Delvin, County Westmeath, Ireland
- Education: MA in Modern English and American Literature, University College Dublin
- Occupation: Radio presenter
- Employer: RTÉ

Éamonn Lawlor (born 1951) is an Irish radio broadcaster on RTÉ lyric fm.

Éamonn Lawlor was born in Delvin, County Westmeath. He was educated at Rockwell College, Cashel, and University College Dublin where he received a Master of Arts in Modern English and American Literature. Lawlor is one of Ireland's leading current affairs broadcasters. He was RTÉ News and Current Affairs's Europe Correspondent from 1979 to 1989. He became the second male presenter of RTÉ News: Six One, from 1992 to 1996. He then joined Brian Farrell and Miriam O'Callaghan as one of the co-presenters of the current affairs programme Prime Time on RTÉ One.

In May 1999 Lawlor left the current affairs department of RTÉ and joined RTÉ lyric fm. He currently presents The Lyric Concert every weekday nights. Lawlor is also a visiting lecturer at the International Academy of Broadcasting in Montreux, Switzerland.
