= David McCullagh =

Irish journalist, author and presenter (born 1967)

- Born: 1 December 1967 (age 57)
- Education: University College Dublin
- Occupation: Journalist
- Notable credits: RTÉ News: Six One; Prime Time
- Spouse: Anne-Marie Smyth
- Children: 1

David McCullagh (born 1 December 1967) is an Irish journalist, author and presenter with RTÉ, Ireland's national radio and television station, where he has presented the Today with David McCullagh show on RTÉ Radio 1 since November 2025. He previously co-presented the Six One News from 2020 to 2025, Prime Time from 2013 to 2020, and was political correspondent with RTÉ News.

== Career ==
He began his journalistic career working for the Evening Press. In 2001, he was political correspondent with RTÉ, along with David Davin-Power. He presents Behind Closed Doors on RTÉ One which details released State Documents. He has also presented The Week in Politics and election and referendum programmes on RTÉ. He was appointed to present the current affairs programme, Prime Time, in September 2013.

In 1999, he won a prize under the category 'TV features and documentaries' in the ESB national media awards. He has also written the book A Makeshift Majority: The first inter-party government, 1948-51, and a biography of John A. Costello. The Reluctant Taoiseach: A Biography of John A Costello, was launched in 2010.

On 31 August 2020, McCullagh began presenting the Six One News alongside Caitríona Perry.

During the 2022 Russian invasion of Ukraine, McCullagh interviewed the Russian ambassador to Ireland Yury Anatoliyevich Filatov on RTÉ News: Six One, asking him pointed questions about Russia's deception prior to the invasion and the unprovoked, aggressive nature of the invasion. The interview was widely praised.

In September 2022, McCullagh was named as one of four presenters to host Monday Night Live, a new eight-part current affairs panel series on RTÉ One, beginning on 3 October.

In August 2025, McCullagh was named as the successor to Claire Byrne as the presenter for Today With... on RTÉ Radio 1, and began in November. He signed off from the Six One News on 31 October.

In September 2025, he hosted a series on Éamon de Valera.

=== Bibliography ===
- De Valera: Rise (1882–1932). Gill Books. 2017. ISBN 9780717155866.
- De Valera: Rule: (1932–1975). Gill Books. 2018. ISBN 9780717179220.

== Personal life ==
McCullagh attended Newpark Comprehensive School and studied politics in University College Dublin. He holds a PhD in the subject.

McCullagh is married to journalist Anne-Marie Smyth; they have one daughter, Rosie.
