= Keelin Shanley =

Irish journalist (1968–2020)

- Born: Caoilfhionn Shanley; 24 August 1968; Dublin, Ireland
- Died: 8 February 2020 (aged 51); Dublin, Ireland
- Education: Trinity College Dublin (B.A.)
- Occupation: News presenter
- Employer: RTÉ
- Notable credits: Morning Edition; Crimecall; Prime Time; RTÉ News: Six One; Sunday with Keelin Shanley
- Spouse: Conor Ferguson
- Children: Lucy; Ben

Caoilfhionn Shanley-Ferguson (24 August 1968 – 8 February 2020), also known as Keelin Shanley, was an Irish journalist, newsreader and presenter with RTÉ, Ireland's national radio and television station, where she had presented the Six One News, alongside Caitríona Perry from January 2018 until her death in February 2020.

== Early life ==
The daughter of Derry Shanley and his wife Orna, Keelin Shanley grew up in Monkstown with her siblings. She studied biochemistry at Trinity College Dublin.

== Career ==
Shanley worked as a reporter and presenter with RTÉ's flagship current affairs television programme, Prime Time for over 10 years, Shanley made a number of award-winning documentaries.

Shanley presented special budget and election coverage, Crimecall, Morning Edition, The Consumer Show and documentary Hacked on RTÉ One, as well as Morning Ireland, Today with Seán O'Rourke and The Late Debate on RTÉ Radio 1. She also worked as a news reporter for Radio France International and for CNN World Report.

== Personal life ==
Shanley lived in Dún Laoghaire.

On 8 February 2020, RTÉ announced that Shanley had died following a two-year battle with cancer, aged 51. Shanley, who died on the same day as the 2020 Irish general election, had first been diagnosed during the 2011 Irish general election and spoke of her experience on The Late Late Show in 2013.
