= Sharon Lynch =

Irish rugby union player

- Born: 17 September 1982 (age 44)
- Height: 1.63 m (5 ft 4 in)
- Weight: 74 kg (163 lb; 11 st 9 lb)

Rugby union career
- Position: Hooker
Senior career
| Years | Team | Apps | (Points) |
| 20xx– | Old Belvedere | | |
International career
| Years | Team | Apps | (Points) |
| 20xx– | Ireland | | |

Sharon Lynch (born 17 September 1982) is an Irish female rugby union player. She represented Ireland at the 2014 Women's Rugby World Cup. She first played rugby in 2008, after moving to Dublin for work.

Lynch is a real estate agent. She is an associate director at Savills.
