= Prime Time (Irish TV programme) =

Irish current affairs programme

- Logo used from 2013 to 2021
- Genre: Current Affairs
- Created by: RTÉ News and Current Affairs
- Directed by: Kevin O'Connell
- Presented by: Miriam O'Callaghan; Sarah McInerney; Fran McNulty
- Country of origin: Ireland
- Original language: English

Production
- Producers: Isabel Perceval, Sally Anne Godson, John Cunningham, Philip Gallagher, Lucinda Glynn, Aaron Heffernan
- Production locations: RTÉ Television Centre, Donnybrook, Dublin
- Editor: Richard Downes
- Running time: 40 minutes

Original release
- Network: RTÉ One
- Release: 17 September 1992 – present

Related
- Prime Time Investigates; Today Tonight; Claire Byrne Live; The Frontline; Questions and Answers

Prime Time is an Irish current affairs television programme airing on RTÉ One on Tuesday and Thursday nights (following the RTÉ Nine O'Clock News).

First broadcast on RTÉ One in 1992, Miriam O'Callaghan has been its main presenter since 1995. Only one show per week is broadcast during the summer months. In January 2013, The Frontline's format and presenter were subsumed into Prime Time as part of a re-branding exercise at RTÉ News and Current Affairs. Pat Kenny soon left RTÉ. Later the Monday slot which had been The Frontline was again split from Prime Time; Claire Byrne left to present the newly branded Claire Byrne Live programme in that slot.

== Format ==
Ireland's current affairs and major societal issues are dealt with, often with politicians, journalists, commentators and industry representatives giving their views live in the studio or via satellite link-up from RTÉ's regional studios and abroad. Two to three stories tend to be covered, with a pre-recorded piece from a reporter followed by a studio discussion. Sometimes the full programme is devoted to one topic, and may consist entirely of an in-depth documentary piece or investigation from a single reporter. Extended or additional editions are broadcast on occasions such as a general election or resulting from major international events, such as the November 2015 Paris attacks. Typically there is no audience attendance, although during these special editions audience involvement and attendance may be included.

== History ==
=== Early years ===
Prime Time in its original format began on Thursday 17 September 1992, replacing Today Tonight— similar in format, which had aired since 1980. At the outset the programme had two presenters, Olivia O'Leary and Brian Farrell, and three reporters, Áine Lawlor, Mike Milotte, and Brendan O'Brien. The introduction of the new programme was part of a wider change in current affairs broadcasting by RTÉ. Today Tonight, which had been broadcast from Monday to Thursday, would now be replaced by five very different and distinct types of current affairs programmes which would be broadcast from Sunday to Thursday. These included Farrell on Sunday, a series where Brian Farrell would conduct a series of one-to-one interviews with public figures. Questions and Answers would fill the Monday current affairs slot and would continue with its usual format of a panel of public figures answering questions from the audience. Tuesday File would contain a weekly filmed report. Marketplace, which was previously broadcast on Network 2, would occupy the Wednesday slot and would deal with financial matters, industrial relations, public affairs and business. Prime Time would round off the week's current affairs programming on Thursday evenings.

=== Cardinal Secrets ===
Mary Raftery's Prime Time special "Cardinal Secrets" broadcast of 2002 led to the Murphy Commission of Investigation into clerical abuse in the Dublin Archdiocese being set up; the Murphy Report was published in 2009.

=== Reynolds defamation ===
A spin-off series, Prime Time Investigates, used to be shown on Monday nights in short seasons of four to six episodes, featuring investigative journalism and undercover reporting. The series suspended in 2011 after RTÉ's Aoife Kavanagh defamed Fr. Kevin Reynolds in an episode aired on RTÉ One with the title, "Mission to Prey", during which Kavanagh falsely accused Fr. Kevin Reynolds of raping a woman and fathering a child in Kenya. Director-General of RTÉ Noel Curran admitted the broadcasting of "Mission to Prey" was "one of the gravest editorial mistakes ever made" at RTÉ.

PTI was officially cancelled by RTÉ director-general Noel Curran on 4 April 2012. RTÉ was fined €200,000 by the Broadcasting Authority of Ireland (BAI) as a result of the defamation of Fr Kevin Reynolds following what the BAI said were serious breaches of the Broadcasting Act 2009. Its report found that "Second-hand repetition of gossip appears to have been treated as corroboration, as Ms Kavanagh did not appear to have met or questioned colleagues who according to the primary source, were aware of the allegations". Aoife Kavanagh resigned from RTÉ on 4 May 2012.

=== Meath East by-election debate ===
On 25 March 2013, a Prime Time television debate held ahead of the 2013 Meath East by-election featured the candidates from the four parties RTÉ perceived to be the front-runners: Fine Gael, Labour, Fianna Fáil and Sinn Féin. Excluded were all other candidates, including the Green Party and Workers' Party candidates, as well as Direct Democracy Ireland's Ben Gilroy, who would finish fourth, ahead of Labour.

Workers' Party candidate Seamus McDonagh said the Prime Time editor had no "consistent criteria" for this decision, and criticised the lack of an invitation to even sit in the audience despite having, he said, the support of several TDs including Richard Boyd Barrett, John Halligan, Finian McGrath and Thomas Pringle. DDI's Ben Gilroy said RTÉ "just basically ignored us completely."

=== Enda Kenny interview ===
Taoiseach Enda Kenny used Prime Time to submit to a rare live television interview on 19 February 2015. RTÉ delayed the much anticipated interview for an episode of British soap opera EastEnders that was broadcasting scenes live to celebrate 30 years on air. RTE had planned to show the episode before the following days episode as an hour long episode. However, the BBC had not made international broadcasters aware of the significance of the episode in the Who Killed Lucy? storyline. RTE decided to broadcast the episode and Prime Time followed the programme.

== Presenters ==
Prime Time is currently presented by Miriam O'Callaghan, Sarah McInerney and Fran McNulty.

Former presenters

- Louise Byrne
- Mark Coughlan
- David McCullagh (2013–2020) (left Prime Time to present the Six One News)
- Claire Byrne (2013–2014) in between The Frontline & Claire Byrne Live There was a Monday edition of the programme.
- Vincent Browne 2000–2001
- Richard Crowley (originally reported for the show in his role as a foreign correspondent, replaced Mark Little as a presenter and returned to radio news after completing his three-year contract.
- Donogh Diamond (joined as a reporter, often covered for the main presenters)
- Brian Farrell 1997–2004
- Pat Kenny 2012–2013 (having presented one edition in 2012 when all usual presenters were unavailable, Kenny joined the show when his former show The Frontline was subsumed into Prime Time)
- Éamonn Lawlor 1996–1999
- Mark Little 2002–2009 (left RTÉ to set up his new social media journalism venture Storyful)
- Michael Macmillan 1994–1996
- Olivia O'Leary 1992–1994
- Keelin Shanley (joined as a reporter, rose to the role of presenter, moved on the present morning news show Morning Edition)

Current reporters

- Mark Coughlan
- Barry Cummins
- Conor McMorrow
- Aoife Hegarty
- Louise Byrne
- Barry O'Kelly
- Conor Wilson
- Rita O'Reilly
- Oonagh Smyth

Former reporters

- Aoife Kavanagh (resigned RTÉ in light of her involvement in the "Mission To Prey" episode of Prime Time Investigates)
- Ian Kehoe
- Áine Lawlor
- Mike Milotte was a senior reporter/presenter from 1992 until 2009
- Clare Murphy
- Brendan O'Brien
- Kevin Rafter

== See also ==
- List of programmes broadcast by Telefís Éireann
