= Jamie Campbell =

Jamie Campbell may refer to:

- Jamie Campbell (personality), Inspiration behind global musical 'Everybody's Talking About Jamie', star of BBC documentary 'Jamie: Drag Queen At 16'
- Jamie Campbell (comedian), American comedian
- Jamie Campbell (producer) (born 1977), British presenter of ITV's 24 Hours with...
- Jamie Campbell (English footballer) (born 1972), English footballer active 1991–2005
- Jamie Campbell (Scottish footballer) (born 1992), Scottish footballer for Partick Thistle
- Jamie Campbell (rugby union) (born 2001), Scottish rugby union player
- Jamie Campbell (sportscaster) (born 1967), Canadian sportscaster
- Jamie Campbell, character in Zoo

== See also ==
- James Campbell (disambiguation)
- Jim Campbell (disambiguation)
- Jamie Campbell Bower (born 1988), English actor
- Jamie Campbell-Walter (born 1972), British racing driver
