= Today with... (RTÉ Radio 1) =

- Other names: Today; Today with Pat Kenny; Today with Seán O'Rourke; Today with Claire Byrne; Today with Sarah McInerney; Today with David McCullagh
- Genre: News and current affairs
- Running time: 120 minutes
- Country of origin: Ireland
- Language: English
- Home station: RTÉ Radio 1
- Hosted by: Pat Kenny (1970s–2013); Sean O'Rourke (2013–2020); Sarah McInerney (2020); Claire Byrne (2020–2025); David McCullagh (2025–present)
- Recording studio: Donnybrook, Dublin
- Website: Official website

Today with David McCullagh is a current affairs magazine broadcast on RTÉ Radio 1 on weekday mornings. The Today with... format, originally associated with broadcaster Pat Kenny who presented the show from the 1970s until 2013, has also been hosted by Sean O'Rourke (2013–2020) and Sarah McInerney (May–August 2020). Claire Byrne hosted the show between August 2020 and August 2025. As of 2025, it is hosted by David McCullagh.

Marketed as a "mid-morning current affairs magazine", the programme format covers current news stories, analysis, sports coverage, with some featured and consumer interest stories. As of 2019, the show reportedly had 321,000 average daily listeners.

== Presenters ==
=== Pat Kenny (1970s–2013) ===
Originally associated with Pat Kenny, who first presented the programme in the 1970s, it was a replacement for Gay Byrne's similar programme. The Today with Pat Kenny format featured current affairs topics with interviews from journalists, politicians, celebrities and human-interest guests.

The programme (known for a period as The Pat Kenny Show) was named 'Best National Radio Programme' at the Plain English Campaign awards in 2005, and won PPI Radio Awards for 'Current Affairs Programme' in 2008 and 2009. As of 2008, the average audience for the show was 291,000. The programme featured weather, sport and news, with Valerie Cox acting as the show's reporter, and Eoghan Corry contributing weekly travel segments.

In January 2012, Pat Kenny was accused of "insulting" residents of a Dublin north inner city community after he referred to "a hovel in Ballybough" during the programme. City councillor Nial Ring was "inundated with calls from annoyed constituents" and responded that there were no "hovels" in Ballybough. Pat Kenny defended his remarks.

In July 2013, Kenny announced his resignation from RTÉ with immediate effect in order to take up a new position presenting a new programme on the rival station Newstalk from September 2013 in the same time slot. In August 2013, RTÉ announced that, following Kenny's departure, Sean O'Rourke would take over the programme.

=== Seán O'Rourke (2013–2020) ===
Taking over from Kenny in 2013, Sean O'Rourke presented the programme from September 2013 as Today with Seán O'Rourke. It was one of the most popular programmes on Radio 1 and one of RTÉ's most popular programmes across its radio networks. As of 2018, the programme had 312,000 daily listeners. It retained much of its format, and covered the main stories of the day, with analysis, sports coverage, news bulletins, in-depth features and consumer interest. O'Rourke presented his last show on 8 May 2020, and was succeeded by Sarah McInerney.

=== Sarah McInerney (2020) ===
Today with Sarah McInerney was presented, during the summer months of 2020, by Sarah McInerney. Launched on 11 May 2020, as the interim successor to Today with Seán O'Rourke, it was broadcast in the same 10:00 to 12:00 timeslot. Claire Byrne took over the timeslot in August 2020, and McInerney moved to presenting Drivetime alongside Cormac Ó hEadhra.

=== Claire Byrne (2020–2025) ===
Claire Byrne hosted the show from 24 August 2020 until November 2025.

=== David McCullagh (2025–present) ===
It was announced, in August 2025, that David McCullagh would take-over from Byrne as host of the show beginning in late 2025. McCullagh started hosting the programme in November 2025.
