= The Week in Politics =

- The Week in Politics
- Genre: News and Current Affairs
- Presented by: Seán Duignan; Caroline Erskine; Donal Kelly; Sean O'Rourke; Áine Lawlor former presenters New presenter coming in September 2026 current.
- Country of origin: Ireland
- Original language: English

Production
- Production locations: Studio 3, RTÉ Television Centre, Donnybrook, Dublin 4, Ireland
- Camera setup: Multi-camera
- Running time: 60 mins
- Production company: RTÉ

Original release
- Network: RTÉ One; RTÉ News channel
- Release: 1996 – present

Related
- Prime Time; Leader's Questions; European Parliament Report

The Week in Politics (TWIP) is an Irish news and current affairs programme broadcast on RTÉ One and the RTÉ News channel. It is presented by Áine Lawlor until 2026, occasionally by Sharon Ní Bheoláin or Paul Cunningham. In its original format in 1996 it was hosted by Caroline Erskine, Donal Kelly and Seán Duignan.

In late 2000's and early 2010's Sean O'Rourke presented it.

The programme reflects on the political week, with interviews and discussions. The majority of guests are politicians who are Teachtaí Dála or Irish Senators. The programme is broadcast live at noon on Sunday and is repeated throughout the day on the RTÉ News channel and its traditional late night slot on RTÉ One. The programme moved from its late night slot to midday in January 2013.

The programme went off the air for seven weeks in early 2020 during the COVID-19 pandemic; it returned at the end of April. Due to social distancing requirements, the majority of contributors then came on air from RTÉ regional studios or via video conferencing technology. Prior to COVID-19, contributors came to Studio 3 on the RTÉ campus in Donnybrook, Dublin. In March 2021 the programme underwent a complete visual and audio rebranding. The Week in Politics is edited by Joe Mag Raollaigh.

New series begun on 20 September 2026 presented Sharon Ní Bheoláin.

== History of notable moments ==
=== Simon Harris interview ===
In October 2020, as cases of COVID-19 increased across Ireland, Level 3 restrictions were introduced in Dublin and some border counties. With health authorities advising more comprehensive nationwide measures be adopted, speculation and debate over what action the government would take intensified. On 18 October, Minister for Further and Higher Education, Research, Innovation and Science Simon Harris went on the programme and said the government would act the following day. He said the action they would take would be nationwide and decisive. The comments were widely quoted in most national broadcast, print, and online media outlets. They were viewed on The Week in Politics' Twitter account 126,000 times. The following day on 19 October, Taoiseach Micheál Martin announced that the entire country would move to Level 5 restrictions for a period of six weeks.

=== Barry Cowen interview ===
On 5 July 2020, Barry Cowen, the then-Minister for Agriculture, Food and the Marine in the new three-party ruling coalition went on the programme to apologise for a drink driving incident from four years earlier. In an extensive interview with presenter Áine Lawlor, he outlined the circumstances of the incident; he said it was a stupid mistake he was very much regretted. Controversy over the incident continued over the following days and culminated in the Minister's sacking nine days later by Taoiseach Micheál Martin.

=== Child abuse compensation ===
Pat Carey, the government Chief Whip, used the show to call for changes to the compensation scheme for victims of child abuse following the revelations contained within the Commission to Inquire into Child Abuse.

=== Seanad controversy ===
Fine Gael by-election candidate, George Lee caused controversy in May 2009 when he called for the abolition of Seanad Éireann on The Week in Politics after hearing that the senators only sat for forty days and cancelled one session to pursue a round of golf. Lee is a former employee of RTÉ, having served as their chief economics editor for years before announcing his decision to seek election. The Irish Independent suggested Lee displayed "a lack of basic political knowledge" as Dáil Éireann sits for just one extra day. Lee called the controversial golf session "an absolute outrage" on the show and, when prompted further on his views, said: "I really couldn't be bothered if they [the senators] were shut down, it's a disgrace". Members of his own party were said to be "furious" at Lee's remarks, with one unnamed senator saying it was an "attack... born out of ignorance... does he want to close down the Dáil, too?". Maurice Cummins described the Seanad as the "whipping boy" of Irish politics and Frances Fitzgerald asked Lee to read over the party's policy on the matter.

=== Bertie Ahern's kitchen cupboardgate ===
When former Taoiseach Bertie Ahern hid in a kitchen cupboard for a television advertisement in 2010, opposition parties used the show to describe the skit as "terrible" for the country.

=== Pat Rabbitte's admission ===
In 2012, host Sean O'Rourke discussed broken promises with Labour Party Minister for Communications, Energy and Natural Resources Pat Rabbitte. During the discussion, with the minister being asked if he had broken any campaign promises, Rabbitte said, "Isn't that what you tend to do during an election?"
