= Karen Creed =

Irish journalist

- Born: Karen Creed; Coachford, County Cork, Ireland
- Education: Dublin Institute of Technology
- Occupations: Multimedia journalist; news presenter
- Years active: 2004–present
- Employer: RTÉ
- Notable credit(s): RTÉ News (2013–present); RTÉ News: Six One; France 24 (2011–2013); Irish Examiner (2006–2013); Dublin's Q102 (2005–2008)
- Spouse: Peter Charmant
- Children: 3

Karen Creed is an Irish multimedia journalist and presenter with RTÉ, Ireland's national radio and television station, where she has been a relief presenter for the Six One News. She previously worked for France 24, Irish Examiner and Dublin's Q102.

== Career ==
Creed began her career as an intern journalist for News Italia Press in May 2004. She moved on to become a senior broadcast journalist for Dublin's Q102 from February 2005 to May 2008, and then as an editor for the Sunday Independent Travel Magazine for four years until 2011. In 2006, Creed was a freelance journalist for the Irish Examiner and at the same time, she was a broadcast journalist and news presenter with France 24 until May 2013, when she joined RTÉ as a multimedia journalist, reporter and news presenter for the Six One News.

== Personal life ==
Creed was born in Coachford, County Cork and attended Scoil Mhuire, Cork and graduated from Dublin Institute of Technology where she received a Bachelor's degree in science and journalism.

Creed is married to Peter and have three children, Simone, Faith and Ronan.
