= RTÉ News: Nine O'Clock =

Irish television news programme

- RTÉ News graphics image
- Genre: News, Weather
- Created by: RTÉ News and Current Affairs
- Presented by: Sharon Ní Bheoláin; Ray Kennedy
- Country of origin: Ireland
- Original language: English

Production
- Production locations: Studio 3, RTÉ Television Centre, Donnybrook, Dublin 4
- Camera setup: Multi-camera
- Running time: 25 minutes (Weekday); 20 minutes (Weekend)

Original release
- Network: RTÉ One; RTÉ News channel
- Release: 31 December 1961 – present

Related
- RTÉ News: One O'Clock; RTÉ News: Six One

RTÉ News: Nine O'Clock is RTÉ's nightly news programme broadcast each night on Irish television channels RTÉ One and RTÉ News at 9:00pm. The bulletin airs until 9:25pm Monday to Friday and until 9:20pm on Saturday and Sunday. It is presented by Sharon Ní Bheoláin as a rotating anchor on the programme alongside Ray Kennedy.

== History ==
Former ident from 2009 to 2014

In the early years of RTÉ Television, Nine O'Clock News was broadcast at 9:30pm. By 1974, the programme was moved to 9:00pm.

RTÉ followed the BBC in having its news bulletins presented by a newsreader, who took no part on news gathering but simply read a script presented to them.

Among the most prominent readers of the programme were Charles Mitchel and Maurice O'Doherty. Later presenters of the Nine O'Clock News included Don Cockburn and Derek Davis. RTÉ journalists were eventually introduced as news presenters including Bryan Dobson and Anne Doyle.

== Format ==
The bulletin usually runs for 25 minutes, including an advertising break which divides the broadcast in two.

Traditionally three separate elements were incorporated within the programme: news, sports results and the weather forecast. The weather forecast was subsequently separated and is now broadcast directly after the programme. There is usually no sports mentioned unless a major event is occurring.

== Presenters ==
=== Current ===
| Presenter | Role | Years |
|---|---|---|
| Sharon Ní Bheoláin | Rotating anchor | 2018–present |
| Ray Kennedy | Rotating anchor | 2023–present |
| Kate Egan | Weekend/Relief presenter | |
| Eileen Whelan | Relief presenter | |
| Karen Creed | Relief presenter | |
| Sharon Tobin | Relief presenter | |
| Vivienne Traynor | Relief presenter | |
| Petula Martyn | Relief presenter | 2025–present |
| Brian O'Donovan | Relief presenter | 2025–present |
| Maggie Doyle | Relief presenter | 2025–present |
| Juliette Gash | Relief presenter | 2025–present |
| Sharon Lynch | Relief presenter | 2025–present |
| Christopher McKevitt | Relief presenter | 2026–present |
| Samantha Libreri | | |

=== Former presenters ===
| Presenter | Years | Other roles |
|---|---|---|
| Charles Mitchel | 1961–1984 | |
| Don Cockburn | 1962–1992 | |
| Maurice O'Doherty | 1964–1983 | |
| Derek Davis | 1975–1991 | |
| Ken Hammond | 1991–1996 | |
| Bryan Dobson | 1991–1996 | Former Six One presenters |
| Anne Doyle | 1997–2011 | Former Six One presenters |
| Eileen Dunne | 2011–2022 | |

== Controversy ==
On 7 January 2007, the programme was embroiled in controversy after reporting that Northern Irish politician David Ervine had died following complications from a heart attack. His death was given extensive coverage on RTÉ News: Nine O' Clock that night, with newsreader Anne Doyle mentioning that "he had just died" as she was reading the headlines. Panic arose following the broadcast, prompting Doyle to state that she could neither confirm nor deny his death. Ervine died the following day.

In March 2009, following the Brian Cowen nude portraits controversy, RTÉ News: Nine O'Clock carried a report on two oil paintings depicting then-Taoiseach Brian Cowen in the nude that were briefly displayed in Dublin art galleries as an act of guerrilla art. The report by Tadhg Enright displayed the paintings and mentioned that Cowen was "not thought to have posed for the anonymous artist". On 24 March, the programme included an apology read by Eileen Dunne "for any personal offence caused to Mr Cowen or his family or for any disrespect shown to the office of Taoiseach by [the prior] broadcast." The original item was removed from the online archives at RTÉ.ie, and the apology added. The news report was criticised as being in "bad taste" by Fianna Fáil Senators Maria Corrigan and Mary O'Rourke and TDs M. J. Nolan and Michael Kennedy. Fine Gael TD Michael W. D'Arcy called it the "most distasteful report I have seen on RTÉ in years". Kennedy urged consideration for the feelings of Cowen's wife and children, and called on Director-General of RTÉ, Cathal Goan, to resign, but did not advocate charging the artist.
