= Samantha Libreri =

Irish journalist

- Born: 13 October 1982 (age 43); Dublin, Ireland
- Occupation: Journalist
- Years active: 2000–present
- Known for: RTÉ News eastern correspondent
- Spouse: Niall Colman
- Children: 2

Samantha Libreri (/lɪˈbrɛəriː/, born 13 October 1982) is an Irish journalist for RTÉ, Ireland's national radio and television station, where she has been the eastern correspondent for RTÉ News since 2024.

== Early life ==
Libreri was born in Dublin in 1983 and grew up in Finglas. Her surname is from a Maltese great-grandfather.

She attended University College Dublin, where she edited The University Observer and received a B.A. in English and Sociology.

== Career ==
As a student, Libreri began working as a news assistant for RTÉ News in 2000. In 2004 she won six National Student Media Awards (Smedias). In 2005, she was hired as a journalist for RTÉ. In 2007 she won a Justice Media Award for her work on road safety with Charlie Bird and in 2011 and 2012 she was named Transport Journalist of the Year. During her twenty-year career as a reporter, Libreri covered issues in the Greater Dublin Area in addition to major stories such as the Carrickmines fire, as well as presenting RTÉ's Morning Ireland and Drivetime radio programmes.

In 2012 she wrote a book about the people of Finglas: Finglas: A People's Portrait, with photographs by Darren Kinsella.

In April 2024, Libreri was appointed Eastern correspondent for RTÉ News, reporting on social, economic, cultural and political developments in all of Dublin, east Meath, north and east Kildare and north Wicklow.

In November 2024, Libreri was assigned by RTÉ News to report on Fine Gael leader Simon Harris for the general election.

== Personal life ==
Libreri is a lifelong fan of Shamrock Rovers F.C.

Libreri is married to Niall Colman. She gave birth to her first child at the end of 2013, a son. She later had a daughter. They live in Clontarf, Dublin.

Media offices
Preceded by John Kilraine as Dublin Correspondent	RTÉ News Eastern Correspondent; 2024–present	Incumbent
