= The Angelus (Irish broadcast) =

Irish religious broadcast

The Angelus is an Irish radio and television religious programme, first broadcast in 1950, of the sound of an Angelus bell ringing for one minute. On radio it is broadcast at 12 midday and 6 pm every day. On television, it is only broadcast at 6 pm, immediately before the main evening news. Since 2009, the programme on television no longer includes Catholic imagery and the Angelus prayer itself is never broadcast.

The bells were recorded at St Mary's Pro-Cathedral, although initially broadcast live.

Radio Éireann first broadcast The Angelus on 15 August 1950. The Secretary of the Department of Posts and Telegraphs, Leon Ó Broin, and the Archbishop of Dublin, John Charles McQuaid, had discussed the original idea in the late 1940s.

The Catholic broadcast has sometimes been challenged, while some non-Catholic faith leaders have called for its continuation, notably the Church of Ireland (although less prominent than in the Roman Catholic Church the Angelus is also part of the Anglican/Episcopal tradition) and the Presbyterian Church in Ireland. Archbishop Eames of the Church of Ireland welcomed the new version in 2009. The secretary of the mosque in Clonskeagh and the Chief Rabbi supported keeping the broadcast.

In 2010 Michael Nugent of Atheist Ireland criticised the broadcast of the Angelus on the state-owned broadcaster. He said that his organisation would campaign for a secular state where neither religion nor atheism was promoted by the state.

== Television format ==
Televised programming began at Telefís Éireann's launch. Images shown were pictures of the Annunciation. More recently, it showed "a number of people of varying gender and ages pause to pray at the sound of the bell".

=== 2009 relaunch ===
From 21 September 2009, RTÉ Television reformatted the broadcast before RTÉ News: Six One. It features seven different editions, with a different person shown in each one. Featured people include a chemist from Finglas, a mother from Sixmilebridge, grandparents feeding swans in Shannon, a fisherman from Enniscorthy and an office worker from Zambia at her office near the Phoenix Park. The one-minute feature attracts an average audience of 318,000. It was developed by Kairos Communications.

=== 2015 revamp ===
From 2015, a new form of the Angelus, The People's Angelus, are transmitted on Fridays, produced by ordinary people, artists, and aspiring filmmakers. Angelus films produced by Kairos are transmitted on the other days of the week.

=== 2023 revamp ===
Saturday to Thursday Angelus had a revamp in late May or early June 2023.

== See also ==
- "We Are Armed with Allahu Akbar": stemming from the Iranian Revolution of 1979, the IRIB in Iran airs the religious and patriotic chant every night at 7 pm IRST (UTC+3:30), right before the start of its evening news bulletin on TV1 and IRINN. The key difference is that RTÉ's broadcast of Angelus is technically separate from the Six One news, while the "We Are Armed with Allahu Akbar" song and its accompanying video sequence are incorporated into the title sequence of IRIB's 7 pm news bulletin.
