= Seán Duignan =

Irish journalist (born 1936)

- Born: 1936 (age 89–90); Galway, Ireland
- Education: University College Galway
- Occupations: Journalist, newsreader, government press secretary
- Years active: 1954-2003
- Notable credit: RTÉ News
- Spouse: Marie Falvey (m. 1965; died 2026)
- Children: 3

Seán Duignan (born 1936) is an Irish journalist, newsreader, political aide and writer. Best known for his near forty-year career with RTÉ News, Duignan also worked as press secretary to the Fianna Fáil-Labour Party government between 1992 and 1994.
