= Brian O'Donovan =

Irish journalist

- Born: 13 June 1980 (age 45); Cork, Ireland
- Education: Dublin City University
- Occupations: RTÉ News Work and Technology Correspondent
- Years active: 2002–present
- Notable credit(s): Red FM; TV3 News; RTÉ News
- Spouse: Joanna O'Donovan (m. 2007)
- Children: 2

Brian O'Donovan (born 1980) is an Irish journalist. He is the RTÉ News Work and Technology correspondent since February 2022. He previously was the Washington correspondent from January 2018 to February 2022.

== Career ==
O'Donovan began his broadcasting career with County Cork radio station Red FM in 2002. Three years later, he made the move to television when he joined TV3 News. Over the next ten years he held various positions including news reporter, finance correspondent and documentary maker.

In 2015, O'Donovan joined RTÉ News where he worked as a multimedia journalist reporting across television and radio news. Since then, he has reported on major international news stories including the aftermath of the 2016 Nice truck attack, the plight of Syrians in refugee camps near the Jordanian-Syrian border, the verdict of the Molly Martens Corbett trial in North Carolina, and on the Catalan independence protests in Spain.

In December 2017, it was announced that he would succeed Caitríona Perry as the Washington correspondent for RTÉ News.

As Washington correspondent, O'Donovan covered two presidential impeachments, the Black Lives Matter protest movement, the COVID-19 crisis, the 2020 US presidential election and the storming of the US Capitol Building.

On 8 December 2021, it was announced that he would succeed Ingrid Miley as RTÉ's new Work and Technology correspondent in February 2022.

== Personal life ==
O'Donovan has been married to Joanna O'Donovan since 2007. They have two daughters. O'Donovan studied Communications at Dublin City University (DCU), and following college he taught English in China.

Media offices
Preceded by Caitríona Perry	RTÉ News Washington Correspondent; 2018–2022	Succeeded by Sean Whelan
Preceded by Ingrid Miley as Industry and Employment Correspondent	RTÉ News Work and Technology Correspondent; 2022–present	Incumbent
