= Claire Byrne =

Irish radio and TV presenter

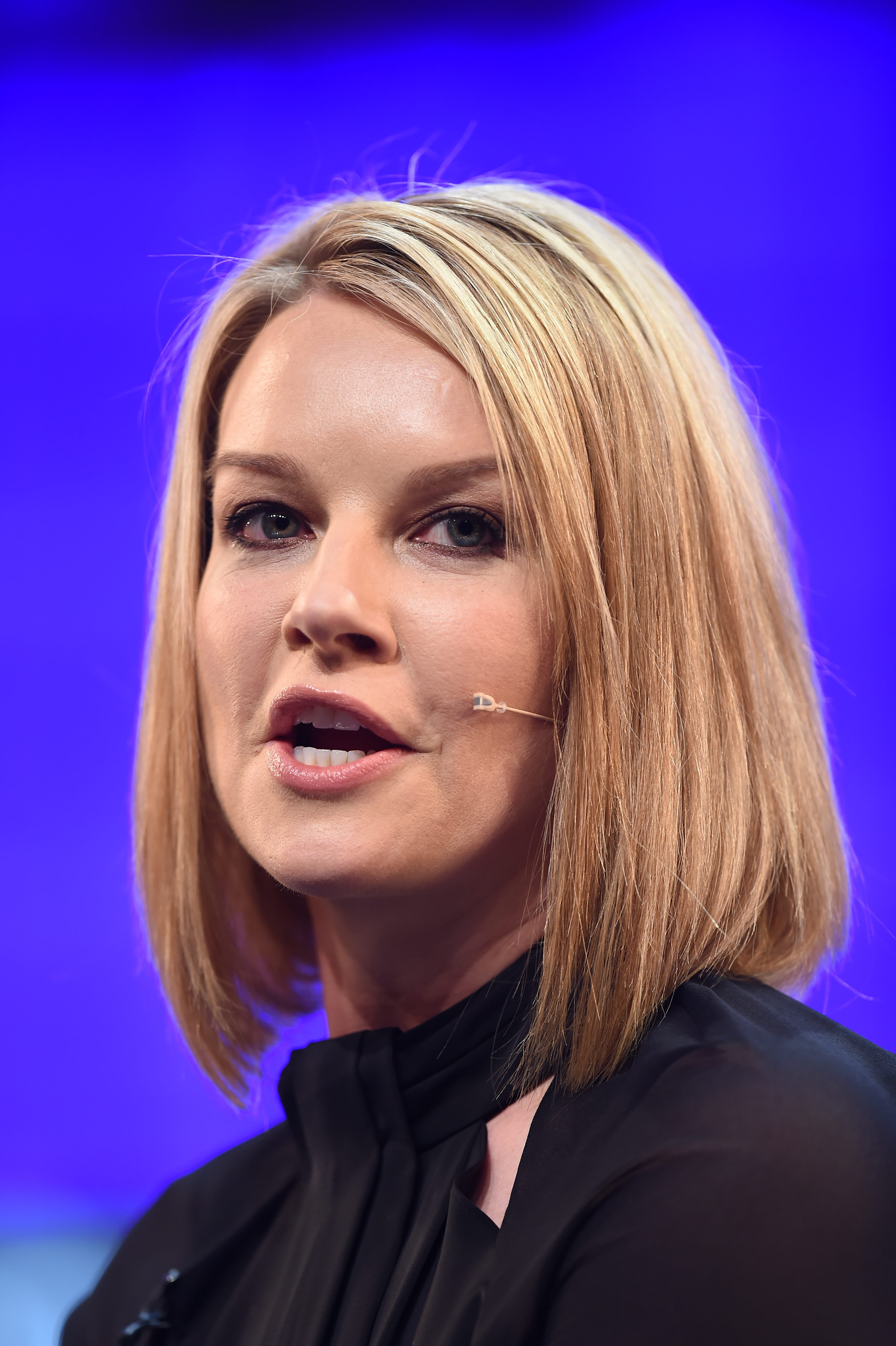
- Byrne in 2015
- Born: 11 August 1975 (age 51); Mountrath, County Laois, Ireland
- Education: University College Dublin; Rathmines College of Further Education
- Occupations: Journalist; Presenter; News presenter
- Years active: 1998–present
- Employer: Newstalk
- Notable credit(s): TV3 News; The Daily Show; Prime Time; Claire Byrne Live Today with Claire Byrne ( RTÈ Radio 1) The Claire Byrne Show (Newstalk)
- Spouse(s): Richard Johnson (m. 2003; div. 2006); Gerry Scollan (m. 2016)
- Children: 3

Claire Byrne (born 11 August 1975) is an Irish radio and television presenter.

Byrne presented The Daily Show from September 2010 to March 2012. In 2013, she became an anchor on RTÉ's flagship current affairs programme Prime Time. From January 2015 until May 2022, she hosted her own self-titled weekly current affairs television programme, Claire Byrne Live. In August 2020, she took over the hosting of the Today with ... programme, presenting it as Today with Claire Byrne on RTÉ Radio 1. In 2025, Byrne announced her intention to leave RTÉ and rejoin Newstalk, with David McCullagh due to take over the Today with ... programme. She joined Newstalk in early 2026.

== Early life ==
Byrne is the daughter of Tom and Breda Byrne. She grew up on the family farm in County Laois, and was educated locally at the Brigidine Convent in Mountrath. She later studied Politics, Sociology and Social Science at University College Dublin, but did not complete the course. She subsequently attended the Rathmines College of Further Education where she studied journalism.

== Career ==
Byrne is a client of self-styled "agent to the stars" Noel Kelly of NK Management.

Byrne began her broadcasting career with East Coast Radio and worked with BBC Radio in the Channel Islands, before becoming news editor with Channel 103 in Jersey. She returned to Ireland shortly afterwards to take up her first television job as a reporter on the fledgling TV3.

Byrne left after just one year to work as London news anchor with Channel 5 and later with ITV News, but was lured back to TV3 to present the station's breakfast show Ireland AM. In 2004, she replaced Gráinne Seoige as the main female presenter of the TV3 News at 5.30.

Byrne joined the independent Irish radio station Newstalk in 2006, amid a high-profile legal case with her former employer TV3, which went to court to stop the news anchor broadcasting on Newstalk's breakfast slot. She presented the show with Ger Gilroy, with Ivan Yates taking over as co-presenter in 2009.

In 2010, Byrne presented her last breakfast show with Newstalk before moving to RTÉ where she co-presented, until March 2012, The Daily Show with Daithí Ó Sé.

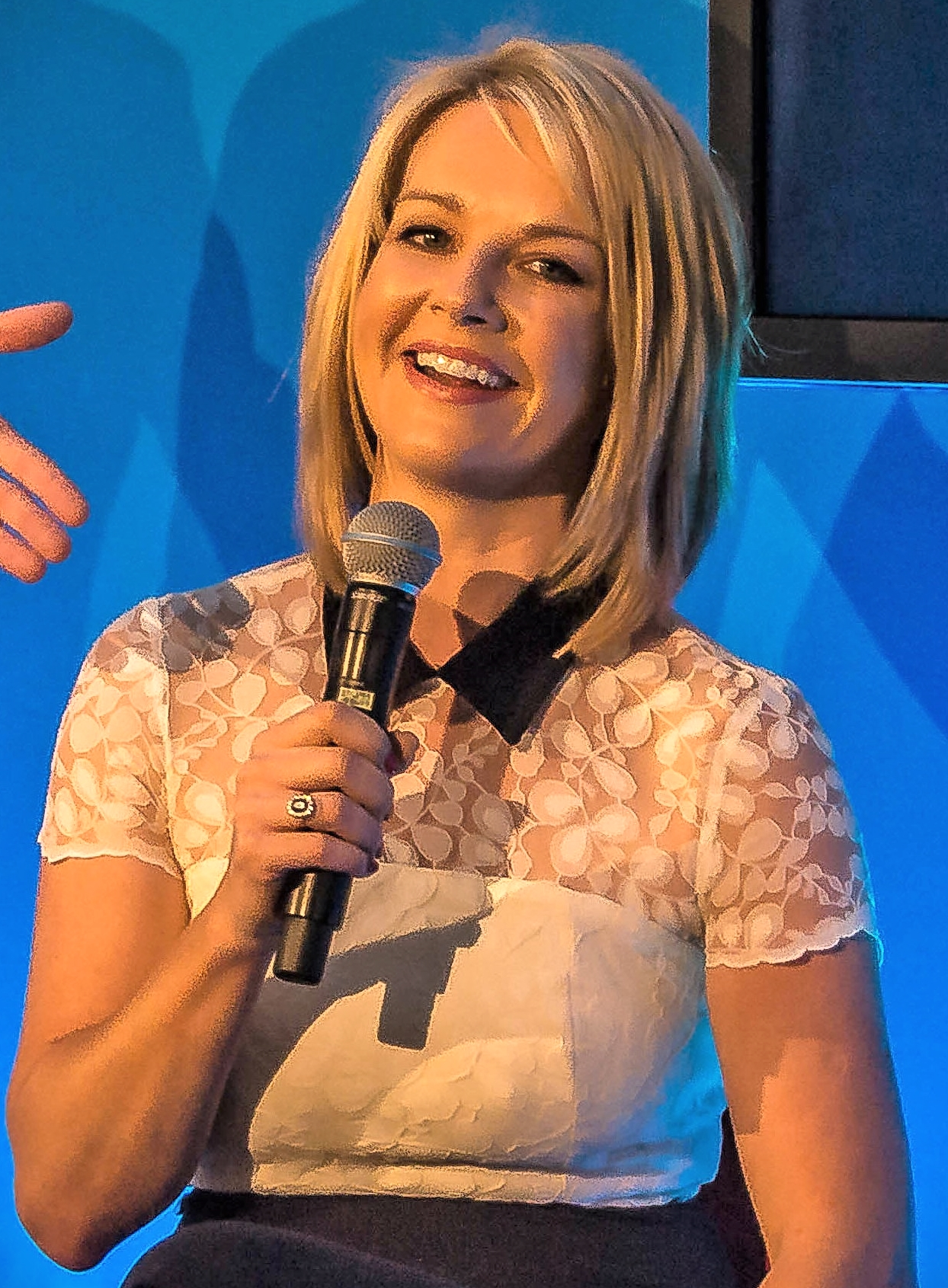
Byrne at RTÉ's winter season launch in 2015

In a major shake up of news broadcasts on RTÉ in early 2013, Byrne joined the current affairs programme Prime Time as an anchor alongside Miriam O'Callaghan and Pat Kenny.

In November 2014, it was announced that she would have her own current affairs show, Claire Byrne Live, which would be broadcast on RTÉ One from January 2015.

In August 2020 Byrne took over as presenter of the re-titled Today with Claire Byrne, which had been known as Today with Sarah McInerney for the summer, after the retirement of Sean O'Rourke.

In February 2022, an episode of Claire Byrne Live aired entitled 'The Rise of Sinn Féin' which featured several guests explaining why they would or would not vote for Sinn Féin. The episode was subject to criticism for alleged bias against the party, the credibility of the responses, and questions raised about RTÉ's responsibilities as a public broadcaster.

In May 2022, it was announced that Claire Byrne Live would end, and its final episode would air on 30 May 2022.

In April 2023, Byrne began hosting Ireland's Smartest, a quiz show developed by RTÉ.

Byrne was tipped to become host of The Late Late Show when fellow NK Management client Ryan Tubridy announced his departure; Byrne, however, ruled herself out in May 2023.

As of late 2025, Byrne was scheduled to leave RTÉ to rejoin Newstalk, starting from early 2026. David McCullagh was named as the new host of the Today with ... programme, scheduled to take over the show from November 2025.

Byrne's show started on Newstalk in February 2026, with The Claire Byrne Show replacing Pat Kenny's slot on weekdays from 9:00AM-12:00PM.

== Personal life ==
Byrne was previously married to radio executive Richard Johnson; the marriage ended in 2006. In 2013, she became engaged to business consultant Gerry Scollan. In 2016, Byrne married Scollan at a ceremony in Dublin attended by close friends and family. She has three children, a boy born in 2013, and two girls, born in 2014 and 2017.

In January 2015, she said in an interview that due to financial commitments she could not afford to be a stay at home mum for her children.

On 23 March 2020, Byrne announced that she had tested positive for COVID-19. She returned to filming Claire Byrne Live in the RTÉ 1 studio on 6 April 2020. Her garden shed, from which she presented in 2020, became the focus of attention again on 4 April 2022 when Byrne tested positive for COVID-19 for a second time and presented both her radio and television programme from the shed.
