= Caitríona Perry =

Irish journalist and presenter

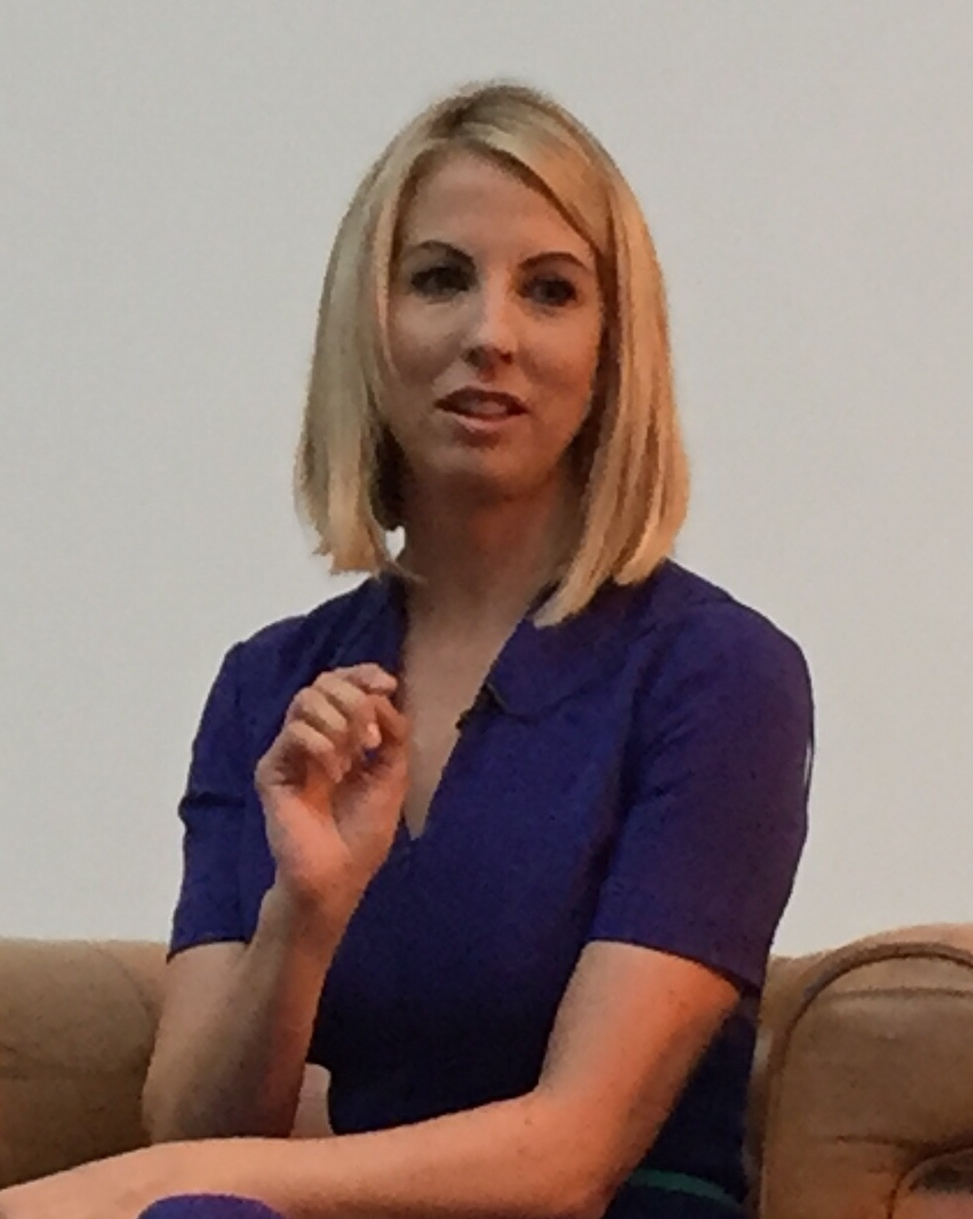
- Perry in 2017
- Born: 15 October 1980 (age 45); Rathmines, Dublin, Ireland
- Education: Dublin City University (B.A.) (M.A.)
- Occupation: News presenter
- Years active: 2000–present
- Employer(s): BBC News (current); RTÉ News (former)
- Agent: Noel Kelly
- Notable credit(s): BBC World News America; RTÉ News: Six One
- Children: 2

Caitríona Perry (born 15 October 1980) is an Irish journalist who works for BBC News as a chief presenter based in Washington, D.C. She formerly worked for RTÉ, Ireland's national radio and television station, where she presented the Six One News from January 2018 to May 2023 and was the RTÉ News Washington correspondent from February 2013 to December 2017.

== Career ==
Perry has a bachelor's degree in journalism from Dublin City University, and a master's degree in international relations. She joined RTÉ News in 2007 after working at Newstalk and Today FM. She became RTÉ's Washington correspondent in 2013, where she covered stories such as the US presidential election in 2016, the first inauguration of Donald Trump and the Berkeley balcony collapse. She subsequently wrote a book about her experience of the election entitled In America: Tales from Trump Country.

Perry herself became the subject of news stories in June 2017 after an encounter at the White House with President Donald Trump. While he was on a telephone call with Taoiseach Leo Varadkar, Trump summoned Perry to compliment her on having a "nice smile", which Irish Central described as Trump being "fixated with" Perry, The Daily Telegraph described as "creepy", and Perry herself described as "bizarre".

In January 2018, she took over as co-anchor of the RTÉ News: Six One alongside Keelin Shanley. She presented many RTÉ News Specials, including the US presidential election in 2020, the inauguration of Joe Biden, the visit by Pope Francis to Ireland, additional programmes during the COVID-19 pandemic, and Joe Biden's visit to Ireland.

On 4 May 2023, she announced that she would be leaving RTÉ after almost 16 years to take up a new role as chief presenter with the BBC in Washington D.C. She signed off for the final time as co-presenter of the Six One News on 26 May and started her new job with BBC World News America in August.

== Personal life ==
Perry grew up in Knocklyon in Dublin. She gave birth to a girl on 29 July 2019, and to a boy on 20 September 2022.

Media offices
Preceded by Richard Downes	RTÉ News Washington Correspondent; 2013–2017	Succeeded by Brian O'Donovan
