= The People in Need Trust =

Former charity in Ireland

Logo

The People in Need Trust was a charity in Ireland. It was deregistered in 2016.

Its main fundraiser, the RTÉ People in Need Telethon, was broadcast by RTÉ from 1989 until 2007 and supported by Eircom (formerly Telecom Éireann), raising more than €35 million in total. The theme tune was "Come On Everybody" by Eddie Cochran. As with The Late Late Toy Show, Gay Byrne presented it wearing distinctive knitted jumpers.

Previously there was Self Aid on 17 May 1986 followed by Telethon For The Homeless on 10 June 1988. The event was replaced by RTÉ Does Comic Relief on 26 June 2020.

== History ==
The People in Need telethon took place nine times. Merchandise included People in Need Telethon T-shirts, buckets, jumpers, welly boots and caps for each event.

=== 1989 event ===
The 1989 event took place on Friday 21 April, broadcasting live on RTÉ One from 18:30 with the opening segment being presented by Gay Byrne. He interviewed his wife Kathleen Watkins reporting from London with music by Johnny Logan, music was performed by Hothouse Flowers, Aslan and Enya in studio with Mick Flavin in Longford that night. Lynsey de Paul also performed a song for the event. There was studio auction with visible telephonists. Maxi reported from Limerick. Tommie Gorman and Ciana Campbell reported from Sligo. Anne Doyle reported from Athlone. Bibi Baskin reported from Cork. Seán Bán Breathnach reported from Galway. Cynthia Ní Mhurchú reported from Waterford. It was broadcast from RTÉ Studios and from the Round Room of the Mansion House, Dublin with Pat Kenny.

The final total raised by the telethon, as reported at the end of the programme, was £2,389,967. The Telethon featured in RTE's Reeling In the Years review of 1989.

=== 1990 event ===
The 1990 event took place on Friday 4 May, broadcasting live on RTÉ One from 18:30 with the opening segment being presented by Gay Byrne, Gerry Ryan and Dave Fanning. It was decided to hold the event every 2nd year (i.e. biennially rather than annually) due to financial problems. Something Happens performed the music that day.

=== 1992 event ===
The 1992 event took place on Friday 8 May, broadcasting live on RTÉ One from 18:30 with the opening segment being presented by Gay Byrne, Gerry Ryan and Derek Davis. An RTÉ strike earlier in the year threatened cancellation of the event.

=== 1994 event ===
The 1994 event took place on Friday 20 May, broadcasting live on RTÉ One from 18:30 with the opening segment being presented by Gay Byrne, charity work was carried out on both sides of the island of Ireland. The events included sports presenter Des Cahill and radio DJ Ian Dempsey bowling. Other entertainment on the night included a raffle and a Cadbury's Treasure Island Hunt, followed by an auction with Theresa Lowe and Derek Davis. The final total raised by the telethon, as reported at the end of the programme, was £3 million.

=== 1996 event ===
The 1996 event took place on Friday 26 April, broadcasting live on RTÉ One from 18:30 with the opening segment being presented by Gay Byrne. Derek Davis and Mary Kennedy in Galway. Christy O'Connor Jnr playing golf interviewed by Gerry Ryan and Joe Duffy.

=== 1998 event ===
The 1998 event took place on Friday 24 April, broadcasting live on RTÉ One from 18:30 with the opening segment being presented by Gay Byrne and Gerry Ryan. The main event included Lorraine Keane. A version of Billy Joel's Piano Man and an accompanying music video was released, featuring artists The Carter Twins, Leslie Dowdall, Christy Dignam, Eimear Quinn, Linda Martin and Paul Harrington, Frances Black, Don Baker, Gavin Friday and Liam Reilly. President, Mary McAleese made an appearance on the night.

=== 2000 event ===
The 2000 event took place on Friday 5 May, broadcasting live on RTÉ One from 18:30 with the opening segment being presented by Gay Byrne and Brendan O'Carroll. The main events included Westlife and Dustin the Turkey performing the music while Aonghus McAnally and Joe Duffy did some reporting.

In 2001, the 2002 event was cancelled, due to financial problems, the introduction of the Euro, Foot and Mouth Disease and the 2003 Special Olympics World Summer Games. The new plan was to hold the event every 4 years.

=== 2004 event ===
The 2004 event took place on Friday 21 May, broadcasting live on RTÉ One from 19:00 with the opening segment being presented by Gay Byrne and Gerry Ryan. A radio station "Charity 252", was operated by celebrities, (including Bláthnaid Ní Chofaigh, Eileen Reid, Brian McFadden, Amanda Brunker, Mickey Joe Harte, Emma O'Driscoll, Shirley Temple Bar, Donncha Ó Dúlaing and George Murphy) locked into a residence for a week, over RTÉ's longwave Atlantic 252 radio station, with nightly highlights of RTÉ Two. A nightly TV highlight show was narrated by broadcaster Aonghus McAnally.

It was decided not hold a telethon in either 2005 or 2006 due to the Ryder Cup in Ireland and the change of Pope. It was decided the following event in 2007 would be moved from late spring or early summer to autumn.

=== 2007 event ===
The 2007 event took place on Friday 26 October, broadcasting live on RTÉ One from 19:00 with the opening segment being presented by Bláthnaid Ní Chofaigh. Following the Nine O'Clock News, Ryan Tubridy hosted the telethon, with Laura Woods in charge of a telephone auction, and Kathryn Thomas reporting from the Eircom call centre. Clint Velour and the Camembert Quartet provided the musical entertainment for the night with guest singers including Dana, Caroline Morahan, Brian Ormond and Gráinne Seoige.

After midnight Charlie Bird did Jason Byrne's Anonymous as "Charles Black" where he fooled colleagues Pat Kenny, Derek Mooney, Joe Duffy, Eileen Dunne and Colm Murray and politicians Willie O'Dea, Mary O'Rourke, Michael D. Higgins and David Norris. However Sharon Ní Bheoláin and George Lee recognised him instantly.

Lucy Kennedy, magician Keith Barry, comedian Karl Spain, boxer Bernard Dunne, Kristina Grimes of The Apprentice and sports broadcaster Eamon Horan also took part in the event. Grimes won the game, which Paddy Power bookmakers had sponsored for €30,000.

The final total raised by the telethon, as reported at the end of the programme by the director, John Holohan, was €7,550,333.

Following the economic crash in 2009 no further Telethons were held, and the charity was wound down in 2016.

== See also ==
- RTÉ Does Comic Relief
