= Colm Murray =

Irish broadcaster, newsreader, and sports journalist

- Born: 22 March 1952; Moate, County Westmeath, Ireland
- Died: 29 July 2013 (aged 61); Dublin, Ireland
- Education: University College Galway; Maynooth University
- Occupations: Broadcaster, newsreader, and sports journalist
- Years active: 1978–2013
- Employer: RTÉ
- Known for: RTÉ News
- Spouse: Anne (?–2013)

Colm Murray (22 March 1952 – 30 July 2013) was an Irish broadcaster, newsreader, and sports journalist, best remembered for his reports on horse racing. Employed by RTÉ from 1978 until his death in 2013, 3 years after being diagnosed with motor neurone disease, Murray was the first sportscaster on the newly launched hour-long rolling news bulletin, the Six One News.

== Early life ==
Born on Church Street, Moate, County Westmeath where his parents ran a petrol station and newsagent, Murray was the eldest of four, with three younger sisters. The youngest sister, Patricia, died from a tumour when she was six years old in 1969 and another sister, Catherine, died shortly before Colm. Murray was educated at the Convent of Mercy National School, Blessed Oliver Plunkett Boys' National School and the Carmelite College. He subsequently attended University College Galway where he completed a Bachelor of Arts in English, French, and History. He later qualified as a secondary school teacher for Maynooth University and spent six years teaching in Athlone, Tullamore, and Ballymun.

== Broadcasting career ==
In 1978, Murray responded to a newspaper advertisement seeking a continuity announcer for state broadcaster RTÉ. His application was successful and he began his presenting career on Hospital Requests on RTÉ Radio.

After six years as a continuity announcer and radio presenter, Murray joined RTÉ News as a full-time newscaster, working alongside figures such as Maurice O'Doherty, Charles Mitchel, Anne Doyle and Don Cockburn. In 1989, he moved into the area of sports coverage where he became a sportscaster, sports reporter and sports presenter, sometimes out in the field but usually in the studio. He was the first sportscaster on the newly launched hour-long rolling news bulletin, the Six One News.

== Personal life ==
Murray was married to his wife, Anne, until his death, with whom he had two daughters, Catherine and Patricia, both named in honour of his sisters. Murray was a cousin of RTÉ radio star Cathal Murray and uncle to professional wrestler Karen Glennon through his sister Mary.
