= Sinéad Crowley =

Irish journalist and novelist

- Born: Sinéad Crowley; 1974 (age 51–52); Walkinstown, Dublin, Ireland
- Education: Dublin City University; University College Dublin
- Occupations: Journalist; novelist
- Years active: 1997–present
- Employer: RTÉ (former)
- Spouse: Andrew Phelan
- Children: 2

Sinéad Crowley (born 1974) is an Irish journalist and novelist who formerly worked for RTÉ, Ireland's national radio and television station, where she was Arts and Media Correspondent for RTÉ News from 2006 to 2023. She has published four novels, three of which were shortlisted for the Irish Book Awards.

== Career ==
Crowley began her career as a journalist and film reviewer for the Northside People and later worked on the radio stations, Raidió Na Life, Clare FM and Radio Kerry.

She joined Raidió Teilifís Éireann (RTÉ) in 1997 as a reporter in Irish language programmes and joined the RTÉ Newsroom as a journalist in August 1999. In December 2006, Crowley was appointed Arts and Media Correspondent for RTÉ News on television, radio and online. Since September 2019, she is a lecturer in journalism at Dublin City University. Crowley was on secondment to COVID-19 coverage on the One O'Clock News, Six One News and the Nine O'Clock News when the pandemic arrived in Ireland.

On 28 July 2023, Crowley announced that she would be leaving RTÉ after 26 years in the national broadcaster.

== Personal life ==
Crowley is a fluent Irish speaker from Walkinstown in Dublin. She attended Dublin City University and University College Dublin and received a bachelor's degree in communication and media studies. She also received a master's degree in women's studies. Crowley is married to Andrew Phelan, who works for the Irish Independent, and has two sons.

== Awards and nominations ==
Crowley has published three crime novels, Can Anybody Help Me? (2014), Are You Watching Me? (2015) and One Bad Turn (2017) in the novel series DS Claire Boyle. All three novels were shortlisted for the Irish Book Awards. In 2022, she published a fourth novel, The Belladonna Maze.

Novel	Year	Award	Category	Result	Ref.
Can Anybody Help Me?	2014	Irish Book Awards	Ireland AM Crime Fiction Award	Shortlisted	
Are You Watching Me?	2015	Irish Book Awards	Ireland AM Crime Novel of the Year	Shortlisted	
One Bad Turn	2017	Irish Book Awards	Irish Independent Crime Fiction Book of the Year	Shortlisted	
