= Tony Connelly =

Irish journalist and author

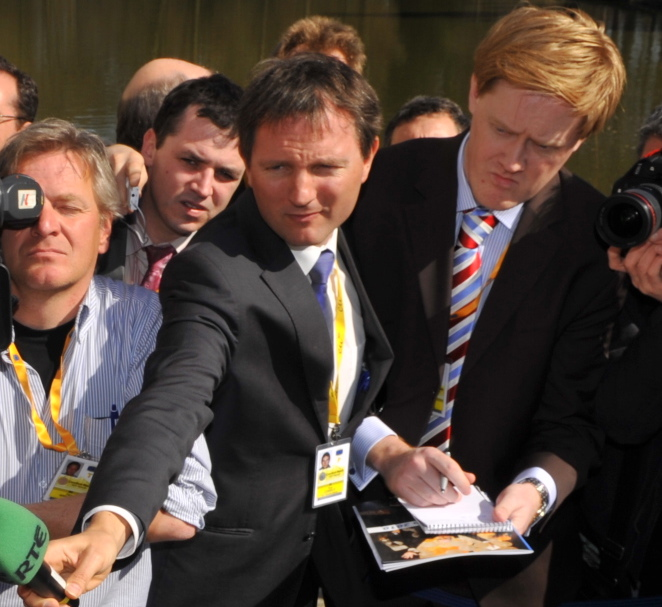
- Connelly (centre)
- Born: 21 December 1964 (age 61); County Antrim, Northern Ireland
- Education: Trinity College Dublin
- Occupation: Journalist
- Notable credit(s): Europe Editor, RTÉ News and Current Affairs
- Children: Matteo, Jack, Felix

Tony Connelly (born 21 December 1964, in County Antrim) is an Irish journalist and author. He is Europe Editor for RTÉ News.

Connelly has written for other agencies and publications, including Time, United Press International and the Irish Independent. His views have also been sought by Euronews, which considers him a respected journalist and "experienced Euro watcher". Connelly's first book Don't Mention the Wars: A Journey Through European Stereotypes was published in 2009.

== Early and personal life ==
Connelly was born in 1964. He lived in Portstewart, before moving to Derry at the age of six. He studied English at Trinity College Dublin. After failing to qualify for a course in the National Institute for Higher Education, he moved to London to work on a construction site. He was laid off after his first day.

He lives in Brussels. His son Matteo lives in Rome.

== Career ==
Connelly's journalistic career began writing for the Derry Journal and the Oxford Courier. He returned to Ireland in 1990. He gained work in the Irish Independent, Evening Herald, Time and United Press International. He joined RTÉ in 1994 as a television and radio reporter.

Connelly has reported from conflicts in Rwanda, Angola, Kosovo, Afghanistan, Iraq, Lebanon, Georgia and Gaza. In 2001 he was appointed Europe correspondent for RTÉ News and Current Affairs, along with Sean Whelan. He won an ESB National Media Award in 1998 and a second in 2001 in the Campaigning and Social Issues category. In 2007, he examined the development of biofuels for RTÉ. In 2009, at least one newspaper indicated he might replace Charlie Bird as RTÉ's Washington Correspondent should Bird opt out. Bird did prematurely leave his post, replaced by Richard Downes. That year he travelled via train around Eastern Europe for RTÉ, through Hungary, the Czech Republic, Poland and Germany, to celebrate the twentieth anniversary of the collapse of the Berlin Wall.

In 2011, Connelly was appointed RTÉ's Europe Editor. In February 2022, while Connelly was reporting on the 2022 Russian invasion of Ukraine in Kyiv, he was forced to shelter in a basement amid fears of further Russian air strikes.

In November 2024, Tony was awarded an honorary degree by University of Galway for services to journalism and European affairs.

== Bibliography ==
- Don't Mention the Wars: A Journey Through European Stereotypes (2009). This book details European stereotypical views. Historian Bridget Hourican in The Irish Times notes the author "has plunged straight in: are all French waiters rude, Germans innately bellicose, Swedes depressed, Spaniards obsessed with death"? Connelly confronts the stereotypes of ten EU countries, visiting them all — "In Paris he’s served in a swanky restaurant; in Spain he attends a bullfight; in Sweden he looks at a skyscraper where none of the windows opens (to prevent suicide)". The book was launched at the European Union building on Dawson Street in Dublin on 25 November 2009.
- Brexit & Ireland (2017).

Media offices
Preceded by Seán Whelan	RTÉ News Europe Editor; 2011–present	Incumbent
