= Sinéad Hussey =

Irish journalist

- Born: Sinéad Hussey; 1983 (age 42–43); Longford, Ireland
- Education: Maynooth University (B.A.) (M.A.)
- Occupation: Journalist
- Years active: 2004–present
- Employer: RTÉ
- Notable credit(s): RTÉ News; Shannonside Northern Sound; Newstalk; LMFM; North West Radio
- Children: 2

Sinéad Hussey (born 1983) is an Irish journalist. She is the Midlands correspondent for RTÉ News since July 2022. She previously was north east correspondent for RTÉ News from 2019 to 2022, and worked for Shannonside Northern Sound, LMFM, North West Radio and Newstalk.

== Career ==
Hussey started her career as a broadcast journalist for Shannonside Northern Sound in June 2004, where she worked as a receptionist, sports reporter and later a senior news reporter. She also worked as a news reporter and newsreader for LMFM in Drogheda and North West Radio in County Donegal.

Hussey joined Newstalk in October 2006 as a senior news correspondent, covering politics and crime.

She moved on to join RTÉ News and Current Affairs as a multimedia journalist in September 2011, where she has reported across television, radio and online news including RTÉ's Six One News, Nine O'Clock News and Morning Ireland programmes.

After working in RTÉ for ten years, Hussey was appointed North East correspondent following a competition on 12 January 2019, and has reported on counties Louth, Monaghan, Meath and Cavan.

On 8 July 2022, she was appointed Midlands correspondent for RTÉ News following a competition.

== Personal life ==
Hussey was born in Longford. Hussey holds a BA in Economics and Spanish, and a MA in communications from Maynooth University. She lives in Mullingar, County Westmeath and has two children.
