= Larry Donnelly =

Irish-American lawyer, political commentator and lecturer (born 1974)

- Born: Lawrence Donnelly; 1974 (age 51–52); Boston, Massachusetts, USA
- Education: College of the Holy Cross
- Occupations: Law researcher Political columnist University lecturer
- Employer: University of Galway
- Spouse: Eileen Whelan (m. 2009)
- Children: 2 (Seán and Larry Jr.)

Lawrence Donnelly (born in Boston, Massachusetts; 1974) is an Irish-American law attorney, writer and political contributor residing in Ireland.

A legal research lecturer at National University of Ireland, Galway (NUIG), he is a regular political commentator on RTÉ Radio 1 and the nightly television news bulletin, RTÉ News on Two, also contributing to his local radio station Galway Bay FM. He has a political column in The Sunday Business Post.

Donnelly came to wider attention when he moderated a debate involving McCain lobbyist Grant Lally and former Congressman Bruce Morrison established by the Law Society and the Literary and Debating Society in the build-up to the 2008 U.S. presidential election, before sitting on the RTÉ television panel on election night, 4 November 2008. He married RTÉ newsreader Eileen Whelan in 2009 and have two sons together Seán and Larry Jr. He is a nephew of the US diplomat and politician Brian J. Donnelly.
