= Goodbody =

Goodbody may refer to:

- Goodbody & Co., a United States stockbroker that faced collapse in 1970 and had to merge into Merrill Lynch
- Goodbody Stockbrokers, an Irish stockbroker, based in Dublin
- Manliffe Goodbody (1868-1916), Irish football and tennis player
- Buzz Goodbody, English Theatre Director
- Will Goodbody, Irish journalist
- James Perry Goodbody, Irish politician
- Tim Goodbody, Irish sailor
- Richard Goodbody, British Army Officer, Adjutant-General
- Catherine Williamson (née Goodbody) Irish politician in Britain, Mayor of Canterbury (1939-1941)
- Slim Goodbody, a fictional character
