= Paul O'Flynn =

Paul O'Flynn may refer to:

- Paul O'Flynn (Gaelic footballer) (born 1985), Irish Gaelic footballer
- Paul O'Flynn (journalist) (born 1985), Irish television reporter

== See also ==
- Paul Flynn (disambiguation)
