= Charlie Bird Explores =

- Bird in the Amazon
- Genre: Documentary film
- Presented by: Charlie Bird
- Country of origin: Ireland
- Original language: English

Production
- Running time: Amazon (1 X 52 minutes); Ganges (2 X 40 minutes); Arctic (2 X 40 minutes)

Original release
- Network: RTÉ One

Charlie Bird Explores is the title of a series of documentary films shot by RTÉ News and Current Affairs chief news correspondent Charlie Bird, in which the reporter travelled to different locations around the world. The series broadcast over a number of years features Bird's adventures in the Arctic, the Ganges and the Amazon. The documentaries were produced by Crossing the Line Films.

For his Amazon journey, Bird crossed South America from ocean to ocean, tracing the course of the Amazon River. En route he told the story of the region and how it plays a crucial role in global warming and environmental change. For his Ganges trek, Bird took a path from the sea to the river's source, battling from the Bay of Bengal to the Himalayas along the river. In the Arctic, filmed in 2008, Bird met the Inuit community in Grise Fiord, Nunavut.
