= Gerry Reynolds (broadcaster) =

Irish journalist, broadcaster and television producer

- Born: Gerard Reynolds; Ireland
- Occupation: Controller of Digital Channels for RTÉ
- Notable credit(s): RTÉ News, Nationwide, The Local Eye, Helicopter Search and Rescue, Rescue 117

Gerard Reynolds is an Irish journalist, broadcaster and television producer.

Born Gerard Reynolds, one of four sons of the Garda Detective Superintendent, John Willy Reynolds. One of his brothers is journalist Paul Reynolds. Reynolds began his broadcasting career with RTÉ Radio 2 as a newsreader before moving to RTÉ News working as a journalist. He was the first correspondent for the midlands, based out of Westmeath in 1988.

By 1996 Reynolds had become head of broadcasting for RTÉ Cork. He was appointed Controller of Digital Channels in 2001. Since then Reynolds has continued to produce documentary and news related shows for RTÉ.
