= IMN =

Imn or IMN may refer to:

- Imation, previous NYSE symbol
- Al Iraqiya, formerly IMN, Iraqi TV broadcaster
- "IMN", a song by Mudvayne on their 2005 album Lost and Found
- Immediate Mobilization Networks, an alleged paramilitary organization formed by Venezuelan President Hugo Chávez
- Instituto Meteorológico Nacional, national meteorological agency of Costa Rica
- Irish Medical News, an independent newspaper for doctors and health professionals in Ireland
