= Sean Whelan (journalist) =

Irish journalist

- Education: University College Dublin, National Institute for Higher Education
- Occupation: Journalist
- Notable credit: RTÉ News

Sean Whelan is an Irish journalist with RTÉ, Ireland's national radio and television station, where he has been the London correspondent for RTÉ News since April 2026, having previously held the position from 2019 to 2022. He previously was RTÉ's Washington correspondent, Europe editor and Economics correspondent.

== Career ==
He graduated from University College Dublin with a degree in History and Politics. He then obtained a postgraduate in journalism from the National Institute for Higher Education and in accounting and finance from the Association of Chartered Certified Accountants.

Whelan began his career in journalism in the mid-1980s as a freelance feature writer with Magill and the Irish Independent, before working as a reporter in London on the business newspaper, Marketing. He moved back to Ireland in the early 1990s and worked as a business journalist at The Sunday Tribune.

He joined RTÉ in 1991 at the same time as Mark Little, Rachael English and Paul Reynolds. Whelan worked in a number of areas, including the foreign desk, serving as the deputy foreign editor. He has reported from wars in Bosnia and Kosovo and on the return of Hong Kong to the People's Republic of China.

Whelan was based in Brussels from 1999. In 2001, he became Europe Correspondent, and was appointed Europe Editor in 2003. After the resignation of George Lee as Economics Editor to begin a career in politics, Whelan became Economics Correspondent.

In March 2019, it was announced that he would succeed Fiona Mitchell as the London correspondent for RTÉ News.

On 21 January 2022, it was announced by RTÉ that Whelan would succeed Brian O'Donovan as the new Washington correspondent from February 2022.

On 28 April 2026, it was announced that he would return as the London correspondent for RTÉ News, succeeding Tommy Meskill.

Media offices
Preceded by Tommy Meskill	RTÉ News London Correspondent; 2026–present	Incumbent
Preceded by Brian O'Donovan	RTÉ News Washington Correspondent; 2022–2026	Succeeded by Jackie Fox
Preceded by Fiona Mitchell	RTÉ News London Correspondent; 2019–2022	Succeeded by John Kilraine
Preceded by Tommie Gorman	RTÉ News Europe Editor; 2001–2010	Succeeded by Tony Connelly
