= Pat McGrath (journalist) =

Irish journalist

- Born: 1975 (age 49–50); Cork, Ireland
- Education: NUI Galway
- Occupation: RTÉ News Western Correspondent
- Years active: 1994–present
- Notable credit(s): Clare FM; RTÉ lyric fm RTÉ 2fm Morning Ireland; RTÉ News

Pat McGrath (born 1975) is an Irish journalist. He has worked as the Western correspondent for RTÉ News since 2012.

McGrath began his broadcasting career with local radio station Clare FM in 1994. Five years later he made the move to national radio when he joined RTÉ as a journalist with RTÉ lyric fm in Limerick, before joining RTÉ 2fm in 2002 as a reporter with the Newsbeat programme. McGrath subsequently worked on the flagship Morning Ireland programme.
