= MidWest Radio =

Midwest Radio
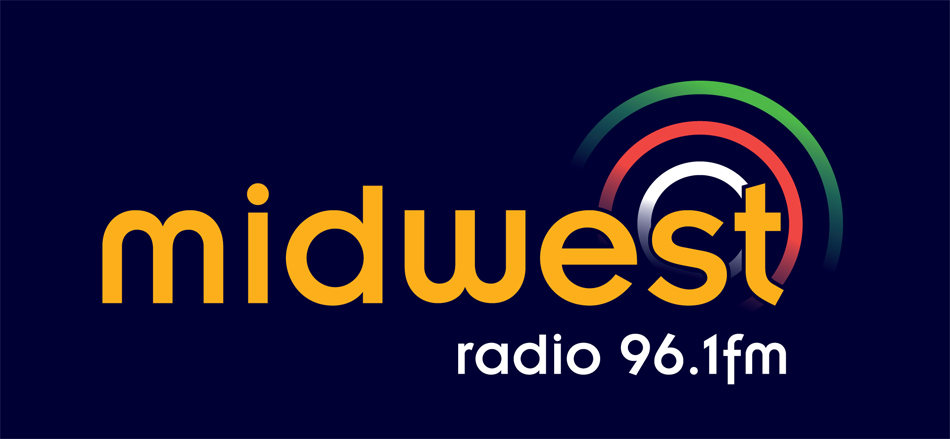
- Logo used since 2008
- Ireland
- Broadcast area: County Mayo (overspill into Counties Sligo, Roscommon and Galway)
- Frequencies: 96.1 MHz (Main); 97.1 MHz (Achill/Belmullet); 95.4 MHz (Westport); 95.5 MHz (Ballina/Killala)
- RDS: Midwest

Programming
- Languages: English, Irish
- Format: Adult contemporary

Ownership
- Owner: County Mayo Radio Ltd (CEO Paul Claffey)

History
- First air date: 24 July 1989 (1979 and 1985–88 as a pirate)

Links
- Webcast: Listen Live
- Website: midwestradio.ie

MidWest Radio is a radio station based in County Mayo, Ireland. Officially opened in 1989 (having operated previously as an unlicensed station), its current studios are located on Clare Street, Ballyhaunis. The JNLR/MRBI radio listenership survey released in February 2020 shows that Midwest Radio has the second highest listenership rates in the country and the highest of any local radio station, with a market-share of 60% of its catchment area.

== History ==
=== Pirate Era ===
The station's roots trace back to 29 September 1978, when Paul Claffey, a local dancehall promoter, initiated broadcasts from a garden shed in Castlerea, County Roscommon. This early incarnation of MidWest Radio focused on pop and rock music, operating without a licence until early 1979. Financial challenges and the broader economic climate led to a temporary cessation. However, in November 1985, Claffey revived the station, this time transmitting from the cloakroom of the Midas Nightclub in Ballyhaunis, County Mayo. Operating on 1332 kHz, the station aired daily from 10 a.m. to 7 p.m., with Claffey and Chris Carroll as its sole presenters. The duo managed both on-air duties and advertising sales, laying the groundwork for the station's future.

Amid regulatory changes in 1988 outlawing unlicensed stations, Midwest announced its closure for 30 December. The news prompted public outcry and a campaign led by local TD Jim Higgins. A farewell concert was held at the Midas, drawing huge crowds and featuring country artists such as TR Dallas and Declan Nerney. Presenters and musicians credited the station for promoting Irish country music when mainstream media would not. The final show was hosted by John Duggan, a retired Garda and one of Midwest's early broadcasters.

=== Legitimised ===
On 24 July 1989, MidWest Radio commenced official broadcasts under a new commercial licence, marking its transition to a legitimate broadcaster. Initially based on Abbey Street, Ballyhaunis, the station later relocated to Clare Street, where it remains today.

Midwest Radio launched an online only radio station - Midwest Irish Radio - in 2005. This has a separate schedule to Midwest Radio, although The Mid Morning Show does broadcast on Midwest Irish Radio. The majority of its schedule consists of non-stop Irish music. Its sister station NorthWest Radio shut down in 2004 having lost its broadcasting licence and was replaced by Ocean FM.

== Shows ==
The station is on air 24 hours a day. Between 1am and 7am an automated service is run, like most Irish radio stations. This automated service consists of "Rewind" which is a repeat of The Tommy Marren Show and The Mid Morning Show followed by back to back music. Regular programming beings every day at 7am, with the exception of Sunday, and finishes most nights at 1am. Like many local radio stations in Ireland, it mainly broadcasts country music and classic hits. Some of the station's programmes do contain current chart music such as The Breakfast Show, The Late Late Lunchbox, Classic Express and Friday night's Hot Hits hour
