= Claffey =

Claffey is an Irish surname. People surnamed Claffey include:

- Daniel Claffey (1869–1924), New Zealand cricketer
- Kieran Claffey (1949–1995), Irish Gaelic footballer
- Niall Claffey (born 1978), Irish hurler
- Peter Claffey (born 1996), Irish actor and rugby union player
- Úna Claffey (born 1947), Irish journalist and political adviser
- Vinny Claffey, Irish gaelic footballer (played until 2003)
- Gentleman Jack Gallagher, ring name of Oliver Claffey (born 1990), English wrestler
