= Martina Fitzgerald =

Martina Fitzgerald may refer to:

- Martina Fitzgerald (Canadian journalist)
- Martina Fitzgerald (Irish journalist)
