= Oireachtas (disambiguation) =

Oireachtas may refer to:

- Oireachtas, the modern legislature of the Republic of Ireland
- Oireachtas Report, a highlights package broadcast on RTÉ One
- Oireachtas (Irish Free State), the historical legislature of the 1922–1937 Irish Free State
- Oireachtas na Gaeilge, an important Irish cultural festival that celebrates the Irish-language arts, and traditional dance; more formally called "An tOireachtas"
- Oireachtas (Irish dance), annual Irish dancing championship competition

== See also ==
- Families in the Oireachtas, list of Irish political families
