= Mícheál Lehane =

Irish journalist

- Born: 1979 (age 46–47); Cahersiveen, County Kerry, Ireland
- Education: Mary Immaculate College
- Occupation: RTÉ News Political Correspondent
- Years active: 1999–present
- Notable credit(s): The Kerryman; Irish Examiner; RTÉ News

Mícheál Lehane (born 1979) is an Irish journalist. In May 2017, it was announced that he would succeed David Davin-Power as joint-Political Correspondent for RTÉ News.

Lehane began his career with The Kingdom newspaper in Killarney in 1999 and later joined the Irish Examiner where he worked for three years.

In 2004 Lehane joined RTÉ News as a member of the political staff. Over the years he was a regular contributor to Morning Ireland, RTÉ News at One, Drivetime and The Week in Politics for more than a decade, while he also presented political programmes on RTÉ television and radio.
