= Vincent Kearney =

Irish journalist

- Born: Vincent Kearney; 1 June 1965 (age 61); West Belfast, Northern Ireland
- Occupation: Journalist
- Years active: 2001–present
- Notable credit(s): RTÉ News (2019–present); BBC Northern Ireland (2001–2019); Northern Editor (2021–present); Northern Correspondent (2019–2021); The Sunday Times; Belfast Telegraph
- Spouse: Louise Kearney
- Children: 4

Vincent Kearney is an Irish journalist. He is the current Northern Ireland editor for RTÉ News since 2021. He previously was northern correspondent for RTÉ News from 2019 to 2021, and worked for BBC Northern Ireland, The Sunday Times and the Belfast Telegraph for 32 years.

== Career ==
Prior to joining RTÉ, Kearney worked as a reporter and producer for daily news and documentaries for the BBC, including four years with BBC Northern Ireland's Spotlight programme. During his 32 years of experience, Kearney was Home Affairs correspondent for BBC Northern Ireland, Northern Ireland correspondent with The Sunday Times and also a journalist for the Belfast Telegraph for nine years. Kearney joined RTÉ in January 2019 as Northern Ireland correspondent, where he reported across all of RTÉ's flagship news programmes, providing television, radio and online coverage.

Kearney succeeded Tommie Gorman as Northern Ireland editor for RTÉ News in April 2021.

== Personal life ==
Kearney was born in West Belfast, Northern Ireland. He is married to Louise Kearney for 30 years and have four children. They currently reside in Lurgan, County Armagh.

=== MI5 phone tapping ===
MI5 admitted in documents submitted to the Investigatory Powers Tribunal in 2025 that they had illegally obtained communications data from Kearney's phone on two occasions in 2006 and 2009, when he was the Home Affairs correspondent for BBC Northern Ireland. Kearney described it as "unprecedented" and that he was "deeply concerning" for himself and other journalists.

Patrick Corrigan, Amnesty Internationals' Northern Ireland director said "The right of a journalist to protect their confidential sources is the bedrock in which the free press is built, so this is particularly alarming."

Gerry Kelly of Sinn Féin said MI5 needed to be accountable, adding: "The government have to bring in an accountability mechanism which works".

Claire Hanna, leader of the SDLP, said "The Policing Board must exercise its powers to conduct a forensic review of surveillance practices targeting local journalism and to examine any political interference by security actors, a clear abuse of power that cannot be justified."

On 23 July 2026, MI5 and the PSNI were ordered to pay £10,000 each in damages to Kearney for illegally accessing his phone data. Kearney welcomed the judgment as "a tremendous victory for journalism and an affirmation of the duty and legal rights of journalists to protect sources".

Media offices
Preceded by Brendan Wright	RTÉ News Northern Correspondent; 2019–2021	Succeeded by Conor Macauley
Preceded by Tommie Gorman	RTÉ News Northern Editor; 2021–present	Incumbent
