= Sandymount High School =

School in Dublin, Ireland

Coordinates: 53.3335°N 6.2255°W

Sandymount High School was a coeducational secondary school on Herbert Road, Sandymount, Dublin 4 which operated for over 50 years before closing in 1999.

== History ==
Sandymount High School was founded in 1947 and was initially controversial because, as a non-denominational school, it wasn't owned by a church but by the Cannon family, who also provided the two headmasters the school had: father and son Patrick and Conall Cannon. Patrick's wife Masie Cannon also served as headmistress.

=== Federation of Lay Catholic Secondary Schools/Federation of Irish Secondary Schools ===
The school was founded against the wishes of John Charles McQuaid, then Archbishop of Dublin. As the school was not run by clergy, there was no schools association for it to join. Together with forty to fifty other schools, they joined the Federation of Lay Catholic Secondary Schools, of which Patrick Cannon would be a leading figure.

The Department of Education didn't recognise FLCSS until 1958, when then Minister for Education Jack Lynch. Lynches' successor Patrick Hillery publicly accused the Federation of blackening Irelands' image abroad in a report the Federation published in 1962.

The Department suspended recognition of the Federation the same year, on grounds of the Federation adopting a new title. In January 1962 the Federation had renamed itself Federation of Irish Secondary Schools, which the Department claimed was misleading. The Federation disputed the reason the Department cease recognition.

=== Students and facilities ===
The school's student body included those from a local council estate called Beech Hill, the offspring of parents disenchanted with denominational/same-sex schools, students on the Malahide/Howth to Bray rail corridor and foreign nationals who paid tuition fees.

While the school had a gym — basically exercise classes — for Intermediate Certificate students, it had no compulsory sports or sports team for a period. Otherwise rugby union was the main school sport for both Intermediate and Leaving Certificate male students during the early 1960s.

=== Rival school ===
A rival school opened next door several years later: Marian College, run by the Catholic Church. It was originally intended to be co-educational and named Riverside College, but both the name and its co-educational character were changed at the insistence of John Charles McQuaid as he disliked the influence of Sandymount High.

The school was closed in 1999 and the land was sold for development. The site now contains a gated community called Cannon Place.

== Alumni ==
Notable former pupils include Fionnula Flanagan, Charlie Bird, Eamonn Dunphy, Dervla Kirwan and Ronnie Delaney.
