= Richard Downes =

Irish broadcaster and journalist

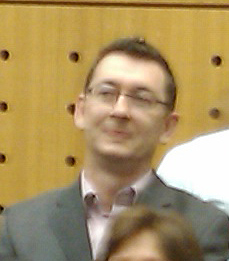
- Richard Downes in 2009
- Born: Raheny, Dublin, Ireland
- Occupations: Journalist, broadcaster, author
- Notable credit(s): Morning Ireland; RTÉ News
- Spouse: Mairead O'Driscoll
- Children: 2

Richard Downes is an Irish broadcaster and journalist. He has worked for the Press Association, Reuters, the Financial Times, the BBC and RTÉ. He was one of the presenters of Morning Ireland on RTÉ Radio 1 from 2002 until 2010 and was Washington Correspondent for RTÉ News from 2010 until 2013.

== Early and personal life ==
Downes was reared in Edenmore on Northside Dublin, born the ninth of ten children. His father was a civil-servant whose library Downes became fascinated with from an early age. He admired the souvenirs brought back from Africa by his cousins who were missionaries. His brother was also based in Nigeria.

He is married to Mairead and they have two children. He lives in North Dublin.

== Career ==
Downes's career in journalism started in 1985 in London, where he worked for the Press Association, Reuters, and the Financial Times. He later moved to the BBC. There he was made Southern Africa Correspondent. From 1998 he was based in Baghdad for two years. He grew to know the country and was sent to report on the Desert Fox aerial assault against Saddam Hussein which took place that December. He was to later write of his experiences in his 2006 book In Search of Iraq: Baghdad to Babylon.

In 2000, he moved to RTÉ News and Current Affairs. He was later redeployed to Iraq, this time with RTÉ. He covered many events in the country since the start of the Iraq War. He left before Saddam Hussein's statue was toppled, claiming he was "at an advanced stage of psychological disintegration" and that the pressure on his family was too much to bear.

Downes published his book in 2006, In Search of Iraq: Baghdad to Babylon, which has an account of his time in Iraq. In 2008, during the 2008 Zimbabwean presidential election, he was one of only a few to be granted access into Zimbabwe. Downes was only allowed to stay in the country for a period of three days but he returned disguised as a tourist and filmed a secret report for the BBC's Newsnight.

He presented Ireland's most listened to radio programme, Morning Ireland from 2002 to 2010. It was announced in April 2010 that he would succeed Charlie Bird as RTÉ's Washington Correspondent. When Bird announced his premature departure from the role, Downes was rumoured by the Evening Herald to replace him. He was in the United States for three years. At the news of the role he said that he was a "surprised but rather delighted man." He took up the role in June 2010.

He returned to Dublin and was replaced by Catriona Perry in late 2013.

=== Literary work ===
- In Search of Iraq: Baghdad to Babylon (New Island Press, 2006)

Media offices
Preceded by Charlie Bird	RTÉ News Washington Correspondent; 2010-2013	Succeeded by Caitríona Perry
