= Margaret Ward (journalist) =

Irish journalist

- Born: Ireland
- Education: Dublin City University
- Occupation: Journalist
- Notable credit: RTÉ News

Margaret Ward is an Irish journalist. She joined RTÉ in 1994, before becoming Foreign Editor in 1999.

== Education and career ==
Ward obtained a Bachelor of Arts in International Marketing and Languages from Dublin City University in 1985. She worked in business and non-governmental organization.

=== RTÉ ===
She joined RTÉ News and Current Affairs in 1994. She was appointed Foreign Editor in 1999. In her time at RTÉ she has provided coverage from over 20 countries and has reported from conflicts in Balkans, Afghanistan, Kosovo, Rwanda, North Korea and Sudan. Ward has also acted as a location producer for RTÉ during the Good Friday Agreement and the Omagh bombing. After a leave of absence from RTÉ beginning in September 2006, she wrote about her experiences in Chad in August 2007.

Ward has also made two documentaries for RTÉ. One programme was on Ireland and World War I and another on the Rwandan genocide.

=== China ===
RTÉ moved Ward to Beijing, People's Republic of China in 2007, setting up a news bureau there ahead of the 2008 Olympic Games. In China, she also covered the 2008 Sichuan earthquake. After €2 million in budget cuts, the bureau was closed in 2009, giving RTÉ a saving of €75,000.
