= Jackie Fox (journalist) =

Irish journalist

- Born: 13 June 1990 (age 36); County Galway, Ireland
- Education: Dublin City University (B.A.) (M.A.); University College Dublin (M.A.)
- Occupation: Journalist
- Years active: 2012–present
- Employer: RTÉ
- Notable credit: RTÉ News
- Children: 2

Jackie Fox (born 13 June 1990) is an Irish journalist with RTÉ, Ireland's national radio and television station, where she has been the Washington correspondent for RTÉ News since March 2026. She previously was a presenter on Morning Ireland and This Week and created and co-presented the RTÉ U.S. politics podcast States of Mind.

== Career ==
Fox began her career with television production company Sideline Productions in Dublin, before moving to radio as a presenter with 8Radio, where she presented an alternative weekly music show.

She joined RTÉ in July 2012 on an internship as a newsreader on RTÉ 2fm. From 2013 to 2018, she worked on Morning Ireland and This Week on RTÉ Radio 1, before moving to the RTÉ foreign news desk in 2018. During her time as a foreign reporter for RTÉ, Fox reported from countries including the United States, Malaysia, Saudi Arabia, Ethiopia and Seychelles on human rights and climate change.

In August 2019, Fox reported from Malaysia on the disappearance of 15-year-old Irish-French teenager Nóra Quoirin, who went missing from the Dusun rainforest resort near Seremban. She reported from the scene during the extensive search operation and on the discovery of Quoirin's body ten days after her disappearance. Fox subsequently secured an exclusive interview with Quoirin's parents, Meabh and Sébastien, in which they spoke publicly for the first time since their daughter's disappearance and death.

Ahead of the 2020 United States presidential election, Fox created the RTÉ U.S. politics podcast States of Mind, co-presenting it for three series alongside RTÉ's then-Washington correspondent Brian O'Donovan, and alongside Sean Whelan during the 2024 election.

After working in RTÉ for 14 years, Fox was appointed Washington correspondent for RTÉ News on 21 January 2026, beginning her role in March.

== Personal life ==
Fox is a native of County Galway, Ireland. She holds a BA in communication studies and a MA in journalism from Dublin City University, as well as a MA in American Studies from University College Dublin and a certificate in business, international relations and the political economy at the London School of Economics. Fox is married to Gareth since their wedding in Connemara in June 2021 during the COVID-19 pandemic. They have two children.

Media offices
Preceded by Sean Whelan	RTÉ News Washington Correspondent; 2026–present	Incumbent
