= Laura Hogan =

Irish journalist

- Born: Athlone, County Westmeath, Ireland
- Education: Dublin City University (B.A.)
- Occupation: Journalist
- Employer: RTÉ
- Notable credit(s): RTÉ News; TV3 News; East Coast FM; Today FM

Laura Hogan is an Irish journalist employed by RTÉ, Ireland's state radio and television station, where she has been the North East correspondent for RTÉ News since January 2023. She previously worked for TV3 News, East Coast FM and Today FM.

== Career ==
Hogan graduated from Dublin City University (DCU) with a BA in journalism. She began her broadcasting career as a programme researcher in TV3 and also worked as a newsreader at East Coast FM and later at Today FM.

She worked as a journalist with TV3/Virgin Media for almost a decade. During her time there she provided extensive coverage of the 2016 general election and the Belfast Rape trial. She was subsequently awarded the Law Society of Ireland's Justice Media Award for her reporting of the trial in 2017 and a certificate of merit in the same category in 2018.

Hogan joined RTÉ News in 2018 as a multimedia journalist, reporting across RTÉ platforms, including the Six One News, Nine O'Clock News and Morning Ireland programmes. She provided extensive coverage of the COVID-19 pandemic, and also covered news and politics in Northern Ireland in 2021.

On 20 December 2022, Hogan was appointed North East correspondent following a competition, and has reported on counties Louth, Monaghan, Meath and Cavan.

== Personal life ==
Hogan is from Athlone, County Westmeath, and lives in Dublin. She is a former student of Our Lady's Bower Secondary School and has two siblings.
