= Fergal Bowers =

Irish journalist

- Born: 1961 (age 64–65)
- Occupations: Journalist; health correspondent
- Employer: RTÉ

Fergal Bowers (born November 1961) is an Irish journalist. He was the health correspondent for RTÉ News until November 2026. Previously he worked as an editor for Irish Medical News from 1988 to 2000, and irishhealth.com from 2000 to 2004.

== Career ==
Bowers has been a journalist since 1980. He began his career working for Rod & Gun, a monthly fishing and shooting magazine and Sail N' Power, a boating and sailing magazine, both published from Rathfarnham in Dublin. He was editor of Irish Pro & Am Golf News, a monthly Irish golf newspaper from 1983 to 1985. He was editor of The Oracle, a monthly newspaper for the Dublin South West region, based in Tallaght from 1987 to 1988. He was a senior reporter and later appointed editor for Irish Medical News in 1988 and won an ESB National Media Award in 1996 for his coverage of the Hepatitis C blood infection scandal.

On 31 October 2000, it was announced that he would be a new editor for Ireland's independent health website irishhealth.com. In August 2004, he was appointed by RTÉ to the senior position of health correspondent. Bowers is most associated with Ireland's national public service broadcaster, RTÉ News, and his radio, television and online coverage of the COVID-19 pandemic in Ireland between 2020 and 2022.

In April 2020, Bowers was involved through COVIDAID Ireland in the release of a charity single On Horseback, in aid of Age Action Ireland and the Irish Red Cross Hardship Fund, for families affected by the pandemic.

== Books ==
Bowers is the author of four non-fiction books: about Opus Dei in Ireland, suicide in Ireland, the BTSB anti-D scandal, and his brother Colman's 1999 murder in California of Colman's wife Georgina.
