= Orla O'Donnell =

Irish journalist

- Born: 1975 (age 50–51); Dalkey, County Dublin, Ireland
- Occupations: Journalist, presenter
- Years active: 1994–present
- Employers: RTÉ; TG4

Orla O'Donnell (born 1975) is an Irish journalist. She is legal affairs correspondent for RTÉ News and presents Finné, TG4's documentary series. She previously was Galway and Dublin correspondent for TG4 from 1996 to 1999.

== Career ==
From Dalkey, County Dublin, O'Donnell started her career as a reporter and correspondent for TG4 from July 1996 to June 1999. She joined Raidió Teilifís Éireann (RTÉ) in June 1999 and has appeared on RTÉ's main news programmes, in both television and radio, almost daily for over two decades. She became Dublin correspondent for RTÉ from June 2003 to July 2006 and since July 2006, O'Donnell is Legal Affairs Correspondent for RTÉ News.

Since 5 September 2018, O'Donnell presents TG4's crime documentary series, Finné, which focuses on Irish news stories that have made headlines over the last 50 years.

O'Donnell reported on the COVID-19 crisis for RTÉ News when the pandemic reached Ireland in 2020.
