= Colm Connolly (journalist) =

Irish journalist (1942–2025)

- Born: 1942; Dublin, County Dublin, Ireland
- Died: 4 January 2025 (aged 82); Cyprus
- Occupations: Journalist; newsreader; author
- Employers: BBC News; RTÉ News
- Spouse: Anna nee Bieraugel
- Children: Eoin & Ciara

Colm Connolly (13 February 1942 – 4 January 2025) was an Irish journalist, documentarian and newsreader, best known for his work with RTÉ News.

== Life and career ==
Born in County Dublin, Colm Connolly was the son of Francis and Sean Connolly, and younger brother to Niall Connolly.

Colm was a guitarist in the Paramount Showband in the 1960s. He later began working as a freelance journalist with BBC Bristol and presented a regional current affairs programme for five years.

Colm married Anna Bieraugel, who worked for ITV and returned to Ireland to work with RTÉ News as a reporter and newsreader in 1975.

One of his first major assignments was as principal reporter on the kidnapping of Tiede Herrema in October and November 1975. Connolly published a book about the kidnapping − Herrema: Siege at Monasterevin − two years later.

In the late 1980s, Connolly also moved into documentary making. His subjects included poet Francis Ledwidge, soldier Myles Keogh and the Titanic. He also researched, wrote, directed and produced a documentary on the life and assassination of Michael Collins called “The Shadow of Béalnabláth.” The documentary went on to win a Jacob Award. Colm wrote the accompanying book “Michael Collins”.

Connolly went on to pen “The Voice” and “The Pact”, both published thrillers, and the as yet unpublished story of Kevin Barry, along with creating documentaries on the famous writers and poets of Kerry.

Connolly was a renowned journalist and news reader for RTÉ News' and the first Arts and Media correspondent for the network, and remained with RTÉ News until his retirement in 2003.

Connolly died peacefully surrounded by his family, on the 4 January 2025, in Cyprus at the age of 82.
