= Yvonne Murray (journalist) =

Irish journalist

- Born: Yvonne Murray; Howth, Dublin, Ireland
- Occupation: Journalist
- Employer: RTÉ
- Notable credit(s): RTÉ News; BBC
- Spouse: John Sudworth
- Children: 3

Yvonne Murray is an Irish journalist. She is the current Global Security reporter based in New York for RTÉ News since December 2022. She previously reported for RTÉ News on Chinese affairs from Taipei, Taiwan.

== Career ==
Murray previously worked for the British Broadcasting Corporation (BBC). She also contributed television reports to Channel 4 News, worked on independent documentary productions and written for The Economist.

In 2018, she re-established RTÉ's presence in China, from where she contributed multimedia reports across RTÉ News outlets including Morning Ireland, Six One News, Nine O'Clock News, Prime Time and RTÉ News online. Her reporting for RTÉ examined Ireland's relationship with China, charted the rise of China's economy, the regime's tightening authoritarianism at home as well as its growing influence on the world stage. She reported on-the-ground from Hong Kong, on the mass detention of Uyghurs in Xinjiang, on cross-strait tensions from Taiwan and from Wuhan, on the outbreak of the COVID-19 pandemic.

On 31 March 2021, it was revealed that Murray and her family were forced to leave China amid concerns for the safety of her husband, John Sudworth who was the China correspondent for BBC News at the time. She and her family lived in China for ten years and decided to relocate to Taiwan, after facing legal threats and pressure from Chinese authorities.

On 14 December 2022, RTÉ News appointed Murray as its new Global Security reporter based at the United Nations in New York. In her role she would provide comprehensive reporting and analysis on global news, and specifically the work of the UN Security Council.

== Personal life ==
Murray was born in Howth, Dublin, Ireland. She is married to John Sudworth, and has three children. Two of their three children were born in China and all three speak Chinese proficiently.
