= Mary Regan =

Irish journalist

- Born: 16 April 1982 (age 44); Moycullen, County Galway, Ireland
- Education: Dublin City University; University College Dublin
- Occupation: Political Editor of the Irish Independent
- Notable credit(s): UTV Ireland; Irish Examiner; RTÉ News; Irish Independent
- Spouse: Paul O'Flynn (m. 2012)
- Children: 2
- Relatives: Emma Eliza Regan (sister)

Mary Regan (born 16 April 1982) is an Irish journalist, who has been the Political Editor of the Irish Independent since 2025, having formerly held the same role with UTV Ireland and the Irish Examiner. She previously was a political reporter for RTÉ News from 2018 to 2025, news editor with the Sunday Business Post and was a regular panelist on Tonight with Vincent Browne.

== Career ==
Regan worked in the RTÉ newsroom before becoming a political columnist for Vincent Browne's Village magazine.

In 2006, while writing for the Irish Examiner she was awarded the "Young Journalist of the Year", as well as GSK Medical Media Awards' "National Journalist of the Year". She joined the Examiner's political team in 2008. She has also reported internationally, including from the White House.

In 2011, Regan participated in the US State Department's International Visitor Leadership Program in she was invited to Washington D.C. She is also an Edward R. Murrow professional journalism scholar.

Regan joined the RTÉ News political staff in 2018, before being appointed the first female political editor of the Irish Independent and Sunday Independent in March 2025.

== Personal life ==
Regan was born in Moycullen, County Galway. She studied Journalism in Dublin City University and attained a Master's degree in European Politics in University College Dublin.

She married the RTÉ news presenter Paul O'Flynn in 2012. They have two children.

She is the sister of Irish film actress and model Emma Eliza Regan.
