= RTÉ Does Comic Relief =

Irish fundraiser event

- Genre: Telethon
- Based on: Red Nose Day
- Presented by: Deirdre O'Kane; Baz Ashmawy; Nicky Byrne; Jennifer Zamparelli; Eoghan McDermott
- Country of origin: Ireland
- Original languages: English, Irish

Production
- Production location: RTÉ Television Centre
- Camera setup: Multiple
- Running time: 4+ hours

Original release
- Network: RTÉ One, RTÉ Player worldwide
- Release: 26 June – 27 June 2020

Related
- People in Need 2007

RTÉ Does Comic Relief was an Irish telethon event that took place on 26 June 2020, in the midst of the COVID-19 pandemic. Raidió Teilifís Éireann (RTÉ) hosted the four-hour telethon "RTÉ does Telethon" in aid of the Community Foundation for Ireland, a trust with a target of distributing funds to over 4,000 non-profit organisations at a national, regional, and local level throughout Ireland.

== Background and origins ==
RTÉ last held a telethon in 2007, in aid of The People in Need Trust. Subsequent telethons had been cancelled following the economic crash in 2009.

From March to May, weekly appeals during The Late Late Show raised hundreds of thousands of Euro for various charities. RTÉ also broadcast the global One World: Together at Home television event in April.

The show developed from an annual St. Patrick's Day comedy show in Dublin's 3Arena, created by comedian Deirdre O'Kane and TV producer Darren Smith, the 2020 edition having been cancelled.

== Main event ==
€5 million was raised on the night, including donations matched by the Government, with a number of Irish and international companies donating large sums of money towards the fund. Unlike People in Need campaigns, due to the lockdown restrictions, no community fundraising (such as bucket collections, sponsored activities, or merchandise sales) took place in the days leading up to the main event. These restrictions were also a big cause of the need for such a fundraiser, as many charities were unable to run their own annual events.

=== Presenters ===
The show was hosted by Deirdre O'Kane, Baz Ashmawy, Nicky Byrne and Jennifer Zamparelli, and Eoghan McDermott as a group, with a pause for RTÉ News: Nine O'Clock.

=== Sketches and features ===
Because of the lockdown, sketches were all recorded in advance, recorded content for the show included a short episode of Normal People with Paul Mescal and Daisy Edgar-Jones reprising their roles of Connell and Marianne, and Fleabag's (hot) Priest played by Andrew Scott. Michael McElhatton reprised his Raymond "Rats" Doyle from the 2000 show Paths to Freedom. Saoirse-Monica Jackson, Louisa Harland, Nicola Coughlan, Jamie-Lee O'Donnell, and Dylan Llewellyn, played Derry Girls-versions of themselves in a sketch with Saoirse Ronan. Peter McDonald and Pat Shortt contributed sketches and the Home School Hub team performed shout-outs to some of their viewers. Donncha O'Callaghan beat Roy Keane and Hilary Rose in a How Cork are You? quiz. Others included Aisling Bea, Hozier, Samantha Mumba, Amy Huberman, Chris O'Dowd, Christy Moore and host of other Irish and international celebrities, comedians, actors, and musicians.

Ray D'Arcy, Dustin the Turkey, Zig and Zag had a Den reunion. This segment was followed by the announcement of a full reunion series beginning in November.

A mockumentary on the history of The Panel featured interviews from its presenter Dara Ó Briain, and panellists Ed Byrne, Neil Delamere, Mairead Farrell, Andrew Maxwell and Colin Murphy as well as guests Adam Hills and David Mitchell.

Westlife conducted a raffle to win a performance at a venue to be chosen by the winner.

== See also ==
- The Big Night In — equivalent event in the UK in aid of BBC Children in Need and Comic Relief
