= Paul Flynn =

Paul Flynn or Flinn may refer to:

- Paul Flynn (Gaelic footballer) (born 1986), Dublin Gaelic footballer
- Paul Flynn (Waterford hurler) (born 1974), Irish hurler
- Paul Flynn (Tipperary hurler) (fl. 2017), Irish hurler
- Paul Flynn (British politician) (1935–2019), British Labour Party MP for Newport West
- Paul Flynn (American politician), Maine state legislator
- Paul Flinn (American football), born 1895, American football player

== See also ==
- Paul O'Flynn (disambiguation)
