= Fiona Mitchell =

Irish journalist

- Born: Fiona Mitchell; 1972 (age 53–54); Killeigh, Tullamore, County Offaly, Ireland
- Education: NUI Galway, Maynooth University
- Occupations: Journalist, news correspondent
- Years active: 1998–present
- Employer: RTÉ
- Notable credit(s): RTÉ News; Morning Ireland
- Spouse: Alan Johnston

Fiona Mitchell (born 1972) is an Irish journalist and news correspondent with RTÉ, Ireland's national radio and television station, where she previously was the London correspondent for RTÉ News from January 2015 to June 2019.

== Career ==
Mitchell began her journalism career with local radio station Midlands 103 and made the transition from local radio to television in 1998 with TV3. Mitchell joined Raidió Teilifís Éireann in 2000, where she worked as a reporter on RTÉ Radio 1's Morning Ireland and the RTÉ foreign news desk before being appointed news editor in 2006. In November 2014, Mitchell was appointed the RTÉ News London correspondent after previously worked as deputy foreign editor. Her appointment came a month after RTÉ announced in October 2014 that they would be reinstating the position, having previously axed it in 2012.

During her time as deputy foreign editor, Mitchell provided extensive coverage of the resignation of Pope Benedict XVI, the State visit by President Michael D. Higgins to the United Kingdom and the 2014 Scottish independence referendum. As London correspondent, she provided extensive coverage of several major terrorist attacks, the Grenfell Tower fire, the 2015 and 2017 general elections, the birth of Princess Charlotte, the Wedding of Prince Harry and Meghan Markle and the Brexit referendum.

In 2019, Mitchell was succeeded by Sean Whelan as London correspondent, and since then, she has been a news correspondent for RTÉ.

It was revealed in July 2023 amid the RTÉ secret payment scandal that when Mitchell was London correspondent, she had to use cafés in London as a workplace and was forced to do live on-air interviews from café toilets due to RTÉ giving up their London office space, whilst RTÉ was simultaneously paying for a membership at an exclusive club in the city.

Mitchell provided analysis from London across television and radio platforms for RTÉ's comprehensive coverage of the 2024 UK general election, alongside London correspondent Tommy Meskill.

== Personal life ==
Mitchell grew up in Killeigh, Tullamore, County Offaly and has one sister Frances, and one brother Barry, who lives in the US state Indiana. She graduated from NUI Galway with a BA in sociology, politics and history in 1993 and continued on to complete a MA in history in Maynooth University. On 16 April 2019, Mitchell received the NUI Galway Alumni Award for Arts, Literature and Celtic Studies. She is married to BBC journalist Alan Johnston. At the age of 31, Mitchell was diagnosed with breast cancer.

Media offices
Preceded by Brian O'Connell	RTÉ News London Correspondent; 2015–2019	Succeeded by Sean Whelan
