= John Sudworth =

BBC journalist

John Sudworth (Chinese: 沙磊) is a British journalist. He was previously the Beijing correspondent for the British Broadcasting Corporation (BBC) and is currently a North American correspondent for the network. He had lived and worked in China for nine years. His wife, Yvonne Murray, is a reporter for the Irish public broadcaster RTÉ. In 2017, Sudworth and his camera crew were attacked and forced to sign a confession in a Chinese village. In 2020, Sudworth won a George Polk Award for his reporting on the Xinjiang re-education camps. After suffering pressure and threats from the Chinese government, he left Beijing and moved to Taipei with his wife and three young children in March 2021.
