= Eileen Whelan (journalist) =

Irish journalist, newsreader and presenter (born 1964)

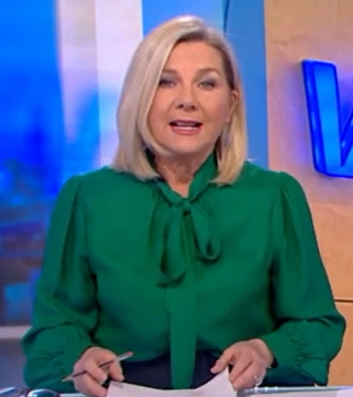
- Born: 1964 (age 61–62); Wicklow, Ireland
- Education: Dublin City University
- Occupation: News presenter
- Years active: 2000–present
- Employer: RTÉ
- Notable credits: RTÉ News: One O'Clock; RTÉ News: Six One
- Spouse: Larry Donnelly (m. 2009)
- Children: 2

Eileen Whelan (born 1964) is an Irish journalist, newsreader and presenter with RTÉ, Ireland's national radio and television station. She hosts The Wicklow Town St. Patricks Day Parade.(Nothing to do with her radio and television things.) As well as her famous roles presenting One O'Clock News, Six One News and Nine O'Clock News, as well as all other news bulletins on both radio and television.

== Career ==
Whelan began her career as a newsreader for a radio station in her home town Wicklow and Dublin's Q102. She joined RTÉ, Ireland's national radio and television station in 1989 and presented RTÉ2's News on Two. Whelan relocated to London in 1997 where she worked as a newsreader for Sky News, BBC News and Independent Television News, before returning home to Ireland to become a news reporter for RTÉ News in 2000.

Whelan presents the One O'Clock News on weekdays and has also presented the Six One News as a relief presenter.

== Personal life ==
Whelan is married to Larry Donnelly since 2009, a legal research lecturer at National University of Ireland, Galway (NUIG), and have two sons together, Seán and Larry Jr.
