= Paul Reynolds (RTÉ journalist) =

Irish journalist

- Occupation: Journalist
- Years active: 1991–present
- Known for: RTÉ News crime correspondent

Paul Reynolds is an Irish journalist. As of 2023, he was the crime correspondent for RTÉ News.

Reynolds has been featured on RTÉ News programmes, on both television and radio, since the late 1990s. He joined RTÉ in 1991 at the same time as Mark Little, Rachael English and Sean Whelan. In June 2009, he won the Political and Current Affairs Journalist of The Year at the Irish National Media Awards.

His brother is broadcaster Gerry Reynolds, also of RTÉ.
