= Radio Kerry Holdings =

Irish radio network

Radio Kerry Holdings is a holdings company that owns several Irish radio stations.

Radio Kerry Holdings was established in 1990. In 2005, Radio Kerry Holdings purchased Shannonside and Northern Sound.

In May 2019, Radio Kerry Holdings attempted to purchase Tipp FM and Clare FM. The deal collapsed in July 2019.

== Radio stations owned by the company ==
- Radio Kerry
- Shannonside
- Northern Sound
