= Paschal Sheehy =

Irish journalist

- Born: 1973 (age 52–53); Tralee, County Kerry, Ireland
- Education: Rathmines School of Journalism
- Occupation: RTÉ News Southern Editor
- Years active: 1994-1996; 1997-present
- Notable credit: RTÉ News

Paschal Sheehy (born 1973) is an Irish journalist. He has served as Southern Editor for RTÉ News since August 1997. He also worked in the print media as a journalist with The Kerryman and as news editor with The Examiner.

Media offices
Preceded by Tom McSweeney	RTÉ News Southern Editor; 1997–present	Incumbent
