= RTÉ News =

News service by Irish broadcaster RTÉ

- Logo used since 2014
- Type: Independent Business Division (IBD) of RTÉ
- Industry: Media
- Headquarters: RTÉ Television Centre, Donnybrook; Dublin 4, Ireland
- Area served: Specific services for Ireland, including Northern Ireland
- Key people: Deirdre McCarthy (managing director)
- Services: Radio and television broadcasts
- Owner: RTÉ
- Website: rte.ie/news

RTÉ News and Current Affairs (Irish: Nuacht agus Cúrsaí Reatha RTÉ), also known simply as RTÉ News (Nuacht RTÉ), is the national news service provided by Irish public broadcaster Raidió Teilifís Éireann (RTÉ). Its services include local, national, European and international news, investigative journalism and current affairs programming for RTÉ television, radio, online, podcasts, on-demand and for independent Irish language public broadcaster TG4. It is the largest and most popular news source in Ireland – with 77% of the Irish public regarding it as their main source of Irish and international news. It broadcasts in English, Irish and Irish Sign Language. The organisation is also a source of commentary on current affairs. The division is based at the RTÉ Television Centre in Donnybrook, Dublin; however, the station also operates regional bureaux across Ireland and the world.

== History ==
=== Early history ===
On 1 January 1926, 2RN, Ireland's first radio station, began broadcasting. Its first advertised news bulletin was put out on 24 May 1926. Nine months later, on 26 February 1927, the station broadcast its first daily news report.

During the Second World War, referred to in Ireland as The Emergency, media censorship of radio broadcasts (under the provisions of the Emergency Powers Act 1939) affected news bulletins. Before any news bulletin was broadcast, the script of the bulletin was read over the phone to the Head of the Government Information Bureau, Frank Gallagher. Censorship under the Act was lifted on 11 May 1945.

=== 1960s ===
On 31 December 1961 Ireland's first national television station, Telefís Éireann, was officially launched. A new Television Complex was built at Donnybrook in Dublin and the news service was the first to move in. Charles Mitchel read the first television news bulletin at 18:00 on 1 January 1962. Andy O'Mahony was the station's other chief newsreader in the early days of the new service. The new studios were still being completed, so construction work was heard during news bulletins. Later, on Telefís Éireann's first full day of broadcasting, Broadsheet made its debut. This programme provided a more detailed analysis of topical matters and current affairs. There was a mixture of incisive and light-hearted items, unscripted studio interviews and filmed reports. Presented by John O'Donoghue, Brian Cleeve and Brian Farrell, some of these men would continue broadcasting with the station until the new century. Telefís Éireann's first full day also saw the first broadcast of the Nine O'Clock News, a half-hour bulletin including news, news view, weather, and sports results.

Broadsheet was broadcast for the last time in 1964. It was replaced by Frank Hall's Newsbeat, a news and current affairs programme that focused more on the light-hearted stories from around the country.

In 1966 Maurice O'Doherty joined the newsroom as a newsreader. Later that same year the station's new flagship news programme was broadcast for the first time. Seven Days had a production team with people such as Eoghan Harris, Brian Cleeve, Brian Farrell, and John O'Donoghue. In 1967 the programme merged with another, Division, and became 7 days.

The news was under the Telefís Éireann's (TÉ) news department, while public affairs came under TÉ's programming department. In the mid-1960s three public affairs programmes emerged. Home Truths, a series to help people with consumer issues, 7 Days, a series that looked a political policy, and Division, a series of debates between government and opposition party leaders. Each would come under pressures due to various different groups, including government ministers.

Home Truths was successful in bring ordinary issues to the fore, in one instance a programme exposing meat prices caused butchers and the meat industry to protest the new TV service, this in turn caused issues for the advertising sales department who were having to deal with boycotts or changes to their advertising schedule, this in turn caused problems for producers who felt force to take on more softer issues due to TÉ's commercial concerns.

Division was produced to replace Party Political Broadcasts. It had been agreed with the main parties that TÉ would invite different politicians to discuss various issues, however even from the outset TÉ had to get the permission of the party's Chief Whip before allowing any local or national politician on to debate. However, when TÉ invited a Farming Representative into a debate with the Minister for Agriculture, the Fianna Fáil Chief Whip refused, stating that the agreement was "for politicians only".

Meanwhile, when TÉ attempted to send reporters to Vietnam for 7 Days they were advised by the Government that this was unnecessary; this view was taken due to Ireland's relationship with the United States. By the end of the 1960s, Home Truths and Division had been subsumed into 7days, while 7days was brought under the control of the News Division.

=== 1970s and 1980s ===
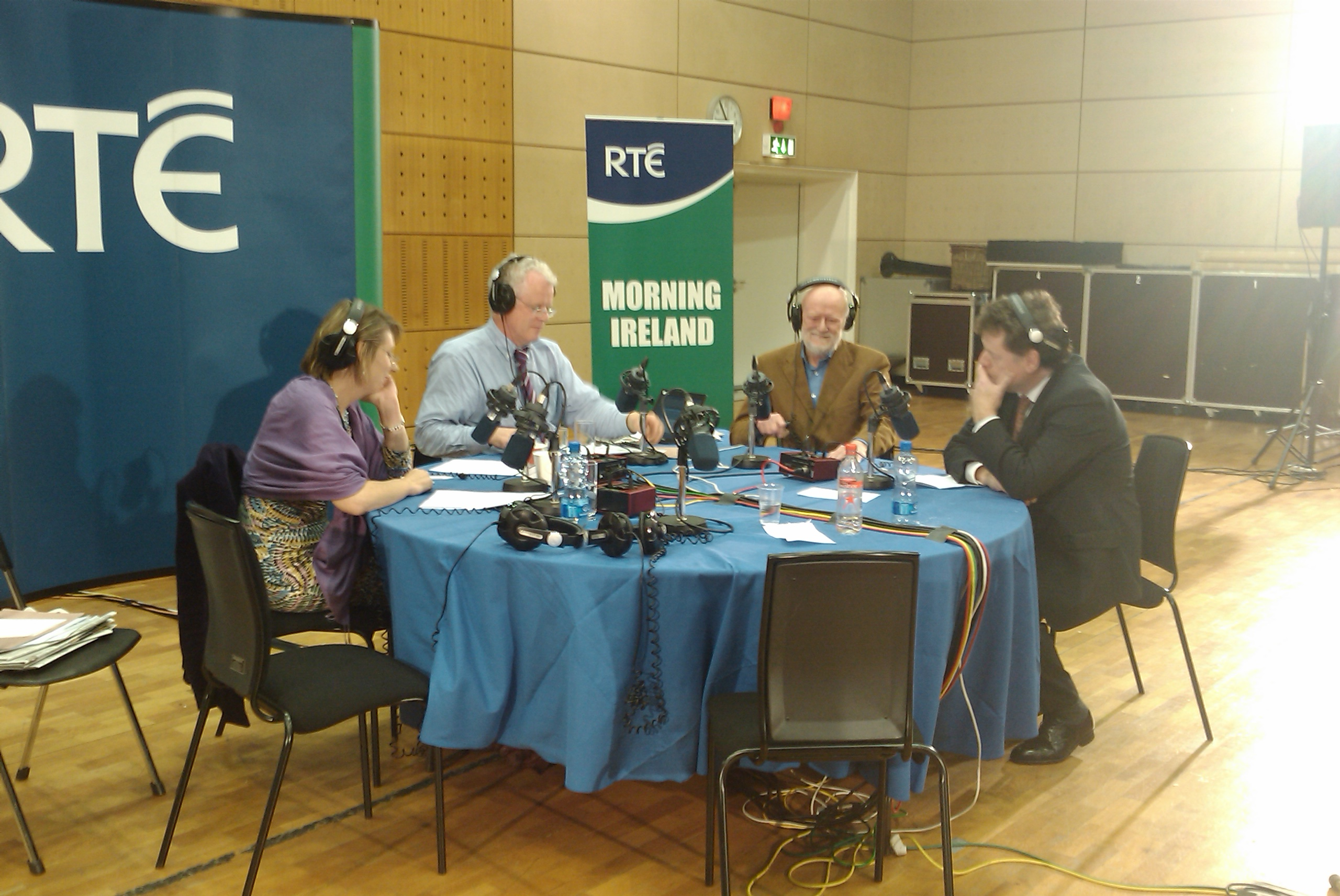
Various presenters of Morning Ireland

When Radio Éireann and Telefís Éireann merged, RTÉ News was expanded, providing coverage to new stations RTÉ Raidió na Gaeltachta and RTÉ Radio 2.

In the 1970s, News moved from the original black and white picture format to colour television.

In the early 1980s, in the space of two years, there were three general elections. This demanded a larger schedule of current affairs. New programmes Morning Ireland and Today Tonight were launched.

The current set of TV News programmes began in 1988, as RTÉ re-aligned their programmes. Seán Duignan and Eileen Dunne were the first presenters of Six One, which began in October 1988

=== 1990s and 2000s ===
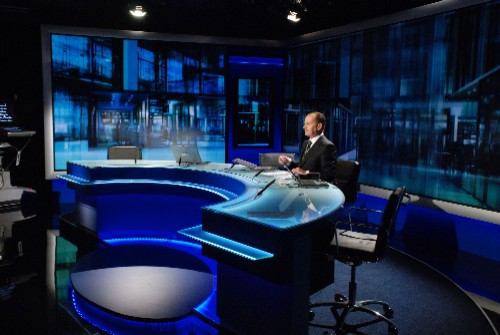
The RTÉ News Studio in 2009

In 1991, RTÉ News appointed its first legal affairs correspondent, Kieron Wood. Also in the 1990s, the first Washington, D.C. correspondent Mark Little was appointed, and Teilifís na Gaeilge, RTÉ lyric fm and RTÉ.ie were established. In 1992 RTÉ launched its flagship current affairs programme Prime Time replacing Today Tonight. Other notable current affairs programmes from the 1990s include The Week in Politics and Oireachtas Report. Ed Mulhall became managing editor in the Newsroom Division in 1994 and was appointed managing director of RTÉ News and Current Affairs in 1997.

Much of RTÉ's News output remained the same throughout the start of the 21st century. In 2003 RTÉ's news department was merged with its Current Affairs department to form RTÉ News and Current Affairs. Also in September 2003, all RTÉ news reports in English on all networks were rebranded as RTÉ News, ending the separate branding of News 2 and 2FM News. In December 2008, RTÉ News moved out of their usual studio 3 in the Television Centre at Donnybrook and moved into a temporary studio while work was carried out in studio 3 for the relaunch. The new look was unveiled on the One O'Clock news programme on Monday 9 February 2009. Due to RTÉ cutbacks, instead of using satellite, reporters on foreign assignments were asked to send reports by internet link. RTÉ's Beijing bureau was closed in June 2009. 2009 brought major changes the current affairs schedule with the axing of the long-running Questions and Answers which was replaced by The Frontline.

=== 2010s ===
The 2010s opened with what has since been commemorated as "one of the most memorable moments of Irish television" being shown on RTÉ's televised news bulletins; amid a deep freeze on 8 January 2010, RTÉ showed one male individual slipping and sliding down the street in Dublin.

On 3 April 2012, it was announced that Ed Mulhall had quit RTÉ News and Current Affairs.

On 24 October 2012, RTÉ News & Current Affairs announced some major changes to its output from 2013. Prime Time relaunched with a larger studio and additional presenters Claire Byrne and George Lee. The Frontline was also brought under the Prime Time brand with the programme now airing three times a week. In 2012, RTÉ announced it was moving some of its regional newsrooms to local Institute of Technology as a cost-saving arrangement. The affected areas are Sligo, Dundalk, Galway, Athlone and Waterford. RTÉ will retain the Cork and Limerick bureaux.

In January 2013, RTÉ launched a morning news programme, Morning Edition, which aired weekdays between 09:00–11:00 on RTÉ One and RTÉ News Now. Morning Edition was cancelled in November 2014. The Week in Politics now airs twice every Sunday premiering live at 12:00 and repeated again at its usual late-night slot. Morning Ireland relaunched in 2013 in a new studio and continues to air both on RTÉ Radio 1 and RTÉ News.

On 26 April 2014, RTÉ News got a new look for all of its news programmes across RTÉ Television, with a tweaked logo, new opening and closing titles, new graphics, new backdrop in Studio 3, and a new arrangement of the 9 February 2009 news music. The new look was unveiled at the Six One news bulletin.

On 22 September 2014, RTÉ News on Two was dropped. It was replaced by two new early evening bulletins called News Feed at 18:55 and 19:55. In January 2017 News Feed was also dropped. RTÉ2 does not provide any news service outside the children's programme news2day.

On 12 January 2015, RTÉ dropped the Monday night edition of Prime Time replaced by Claire Byrne Live.

On 27 October 2017, RTÉ launched its News Archives Collection not filled much after Christmas Eve 2020 (7 March 1985 – 31 December 1990). Plans to close the gaps on missing dates only 14 clips were filled between June 2021 and April 2022. But plans to upload film news (31 December 1961 – 6 March 1985) or (1991–1999) on videotape should be decided in late May or early June 2022 via RTÉ Archives.

In the summer of 2018, RTÉ announced their plan to refurbish and overhaul their news output in early 2019. RTÉ confirmed that they would be putting out to tender a contract worth close to €1.7 million to refurbish and renovate their news studio "Studio 3" at RTÉ Television Centre in Dublin. The overhaul would see the studio being redesigned, with a smaller news desk area and a larger second presentation area, along with new lighting, graphics, music, and presentation.

On 15 December 2018, RTÉ News moved out of Studio 3 into a temporary studio (Studio 2) at the television centre. Work then commenced on refurbishing and overhauling Studio 3.

The refurbished Studio 3 of RTÉ was relaunched on 28 January 2019. Jon Williams, RTÉ News & Current Affairs Managing Director, said: "The new studio and design builds on the themes that have made RTÉ Ireland's number one choice for TV News – bringing our audiences stories from across the world and around the corner. I'm particularly thrilled that "O'Donnell Abú" will again herald the news of the day – and grateful to the RTÉ National Symphony Orchestra for their interpretation of an iconic piece of music. The star of the news is the news – and I'm delighted that the audiences to RTÉ News will reap a dividend from last year's land sale."

=== 2020s ===
On 30 May 2022, Claire Byrne Live was axed and canceled after seven years.

In June 2022, managing director of RTÉ News and Current Affairs, Jon Williams, announced his departure from RTÉ. In December of that year, Deirdre McCarthy was appointed as RTÉ's first female managing director, having held the position on an interim basis.

From October to December 2022, it was called Monday Night Live but Upfront with Katie Hannon was the official replacement on Monday 30 January 2023. After 2 years, it was axed on 26 May 2025.

In 2026, an RTÉ investigation titled "Christian Brothers – The Assets, The Abusers" won the "Journalism Award" at the 2026 Sandford St Martin Awards, which recognise excellence in broadcasting on religion, ethics, and spirituality. The judges praised its rigorous and well-evidenced journalism.

== Programming ==
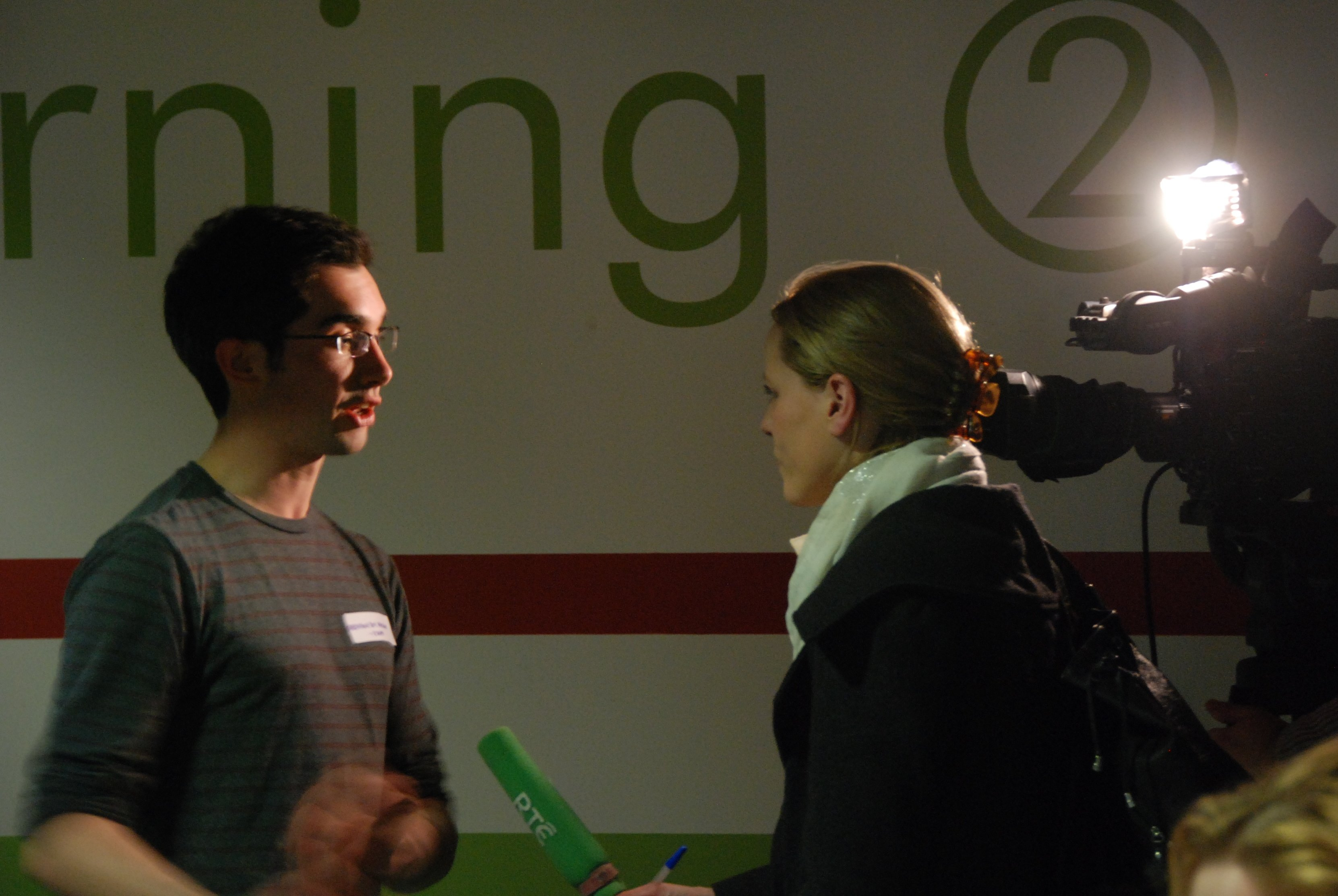
An interview for Nuacht RTÉ taking place

RTÉ News and Current Affairs is responsible for all the news across all RTÉ broadcasting and online services. along with providing news to TG4. General news bulletins on TV and radio are usually branded as RTÉ News.

RTÉ News faces competition from within Ireland and abroad. National news competitors include Virgin Media News on TV and Bauer Media Audio Ireland on Radio (via Newstalk and Today FM). As Ireland is a predominantly English-speaking nation, international news channels (CNBC Europe, CNN International, EuroNews, France 24, BBC News, Sky News, etc.) compete with RTÉ with regards television news coverage of international events. Despite this competition, however, RTÉ News remains the most popular source of news in Ireland. RTÉ News and the Irish Times remain the two most trusted media outlets in Ireland.

=== Television programmes ===
RTÉ News and Current Affairs television programmes include:

==== English-language ====
- RTÉ News: One O'Clock
- RTÉ News: Six One
- RTÉ News: Nine O'Clock
- Prime Time
- Leader's Questions
- The Week in Politics
- European Parliament Report
- news2day

==== Former TV programmes ====
- Questions and Answers
- One to One
- Oireachtas Report
- RTÉ News: Headlines (RTÉ One mid-morning, afternoon and late-night bulletins)
- RTÉ News on Two
- The Frontline
- Claire Byrne Live
- Morning Edition
- Upfront with Katie Hannon

==== Special news programmes ====
The department also broadcasts numerous special programmes throughout the year. RTÉ has comprehensively covered every general and local election in Ireland since it was established. RTÉ has also covered some international elections such as elections for the Northern Ireland Assembly and Westminster as well as the US Presidential Election. Each year the Budget is covered with the budget delivery and analysis given on RTÉ One with RTÉ2 covering the live budget debate from Dáil Éireann.

On occasion RTÉ may also provide rolling news coverage on an important developing news story such as on 9/11, the London Bombings of 2005, the COVID-19 pandemic and events in Ireland such as the Dublin riots of 2006 and the 2023 historic visit of US President Joe Biden to Ireland. Schedules are usually interrupted on RTÉ One to provide details of breaking stories.

==== Irish-language ====
- Nuacht RTÉ
- Nuacht TG4
- Timpeall na Tíre (TG4)
- 7 Lá (TG4)

Irish Sign Language

- RTÉ News with Signing
- Cinnlinte Nuachta until 2009.

==== Weather forecasts ====
Weather forecasts are provided by Met Éireann developed and presented largely by a team of meteorologists and specially trained weather presenters. The first televised weather forecast occurred on 31 December 1961.

RTÉ Weather provides regional, national, European and world weather reports. Special weather reports occur during significant weather events and specialist reports during the European ski season and reports for warmer climates during the winter season. Weather reports are in Irish, Irish Sign Language, and English.

Weather reports are also supplied for radio, online and on the RTÉ Player.

=== Radio ===
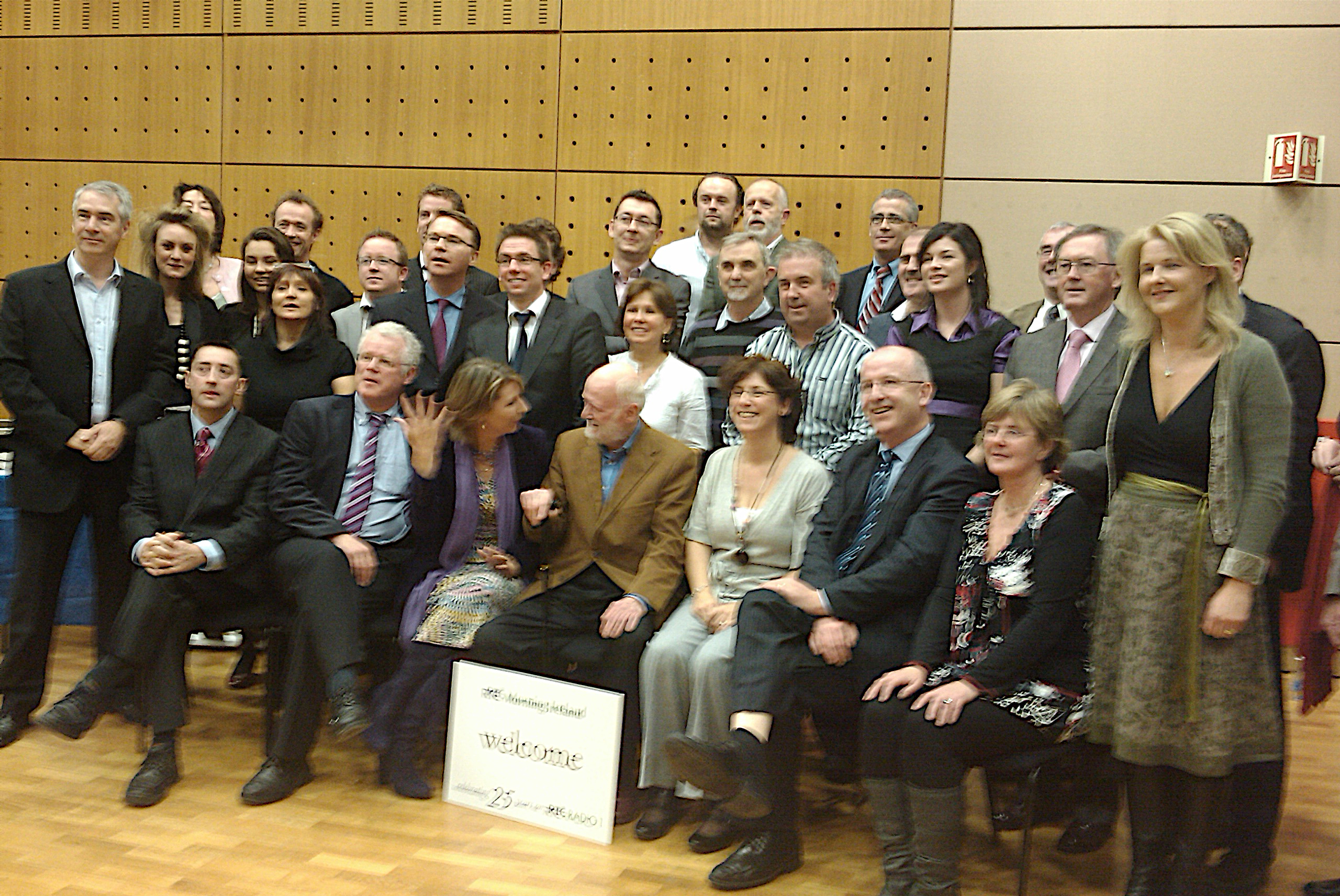
RTÉ News and Current Affairs team that have spent time on Morning Ireland

RTÉ News and Current Affairs radio programmes include:

==== English-language ====
- Morning Ireland
- RTÉ News at One
- Drivetime
- World Report
- This Week
- News bulletins on the hour on RTÉ Radio 1
- News bulletins on the hour on RTÉ 2fm from 7am until 7pm, sport only bulletins from 8pm until 12am.
- News bulletins on the half-hour on RTÉ Lyric fm.

==== Irish-language ====
- Adhmhaidin
- Nuacht a hAon
- Nuacht a Sé
- Regular Irish-language news bulletins on RTÉ Radio 1, RTÉ 2fm and RTÉ Raidió na Gaeltachta.

=== Online ===
Launched in May 1996; RTÉ News content is also available worldwide on the internet at rté.ie/news. The website provides news content in visual, audio and written formats. Users have the opportunity to stream previous news broadcasts from both TV and radio. Archived material is available through RTÉ Archive. Content is also made available through social media such as Facebook, Instagram, and Twitter. RTÉ News also produces an app which features breaking news content among other news content.

=== RTÉ News channel ===
Since 12 June 2008, RTÉ News has been served by the RTÉ News channel, formerly RTÉ News Now. The channel airs commercial-free 24 hours a day with the latest live news. The station was initially made available on mobile phones and online at rte.ie/news. The channel broadcasts in the Irish, English and ISL languages. The channel is also available on Saorview (channel 6), Sky channel 578, Eir channel 200, Virgin Media channel 200, mobile phone service providers such as O2 Ireland, Vodafone Ireland and Android. The channel also provides a free service to users of iPhone, iPod Touch and iPad. The channel was available on train services within Dublin city and surrounding regions under a special agreement between Irish Rail, Transvision and RTÉ. Previously, Sky News provided such a service. The channel was rebranded from RTÉ News Now to RTÉ News channel in August 2020 with minor changes to its programming line-up.

== Bureaux ==
RTÉ have studios and offices in the following locations:

Regional

- Athlone
- Baile na nGall
- Belfast
- Castlebar
- Cork
- Derry
- Dublin
- Dundalk
- Galway
- Letterkenny
- Limerick
- Sligo
- Waterford

International

- Beijing (closed following the 2008 Beijing Olympics, reopened in 2018 with Yvonne Murray and closed again since 2021)
- Brussels
- London
- Washington D.C.

== Notable staff past and present ==
Regular newsreaders	Role
Eileen Whelan	Anchor of the RTÉ News: One O'Clock
Sharon Tobin	Co-anchors of the RTÉ News: Six One
Tommy Meskill	Co-anchors of the RTÉ News: Six One
Sharon Ní Bheoláin	Rotating anchors of the RTÉ News: Nine O'Clock
Ray Kennedy	Rotating anchors of the RTÉ News: Nine O'Clock

=== Reporters ===
==== Regional ====
Northern Ireland

- Vincent Kearney (Northern editor)
- Conor Macauley (Northern correspondent)

East

- Samantha Libreri (Eastern correspondent)

North East

- Laura Hogan (North East correspondent)

North West

- Shane Ó Curraighín (North West correspondent)

West

- Pat McGrath (Western correspondent)

Mid West

- Petula Martyn (Mid West correspondent)

Midlands

- Sinéad Hussey (Midlands correspondent)

South East

- Conor Kane (South East correspondent)

South

- Paschal Sheehy (Southern editor)
- Barry Gallagher (Reporter)
- Seán Mac an tSíthigh (Reporter)

==== International ====
- Eimear Lowe (Foreign editor)
- Edmund Heaphy (Deputy Foreign editor)
- Tony Connelly (Europe editor)
- Liam Nolan (Eastern Europe reporter)
- Jackie Fox (Washington correspondent)
- Sean Whelan (London correspondent)
- Fiona Mitchell (Correspondent)
- Yvonne Murray (Global Security reporter)

==== Specialist correspondents and editors ====
Politics

- Micheál Lehane (Correspondent)
- Barry Lenihan (Correspondent)
- Sandra Hurley (Reporter)
- Joe Mag Raollaigh (Political coverage editor)

Economy and Industry

- David Murphy (Economics and Public Affairs)
- Fergal O'Brien (Business)
- Brian O'Donovan (Work and Technology)

Legal and Justice

- Vivienne Traynor (Courts)
- Orla O'Donnell (Legal Affairs)
- Paul Reynolds (Crime)

Specialist Affairs

- Fergal Bowers (Health)
- George Lee (Environment)
- Aengus Cox (Agriculture and Consumer Affairs)
- Ailbhe Conneely (Social Affairs and Religion)
- Emma O'Kelly (Education)
- Evelyn O'Rourke (Arts and Media)

=== Former newsreaders ===
- Don Cockburn
- Peter Collins
- Richard Crowley
- Derek Davis
- Bryan Dobson
- Anne Doyle
- Seán Duignan
- Eileen Dunne
- John Finnerty
- Noel Fogarty, sacked in September 2021
- Jimmy Greeley
- Mary Kennedy
- Éamonn Lawlor
- Flor McCarthy
- Aengus Mac Grianna
- David McCullagh
- Geraldine McInerney
- Charles Mitchel
- Michael Murphy
- Colm Murray
- Maurice O'Doherty
- Una O'Hagan
- Andy O'Mahony
- Caitríona Perry
- Deirdre Purcell
- Keelin Shanley
- Kate Smith (later UTV)
- Fionnuala Sweeney
- Terry Wogan
- Vere Wynne-Jones

=== Former reporters and correspondents ===
- Charlie Bird (Chief News correspondent)
- Úna Claffey (Political correspondent)
- Carole Coleman (Washington correspondent), current reporter
- Colm Connolly (Arts and Media correspondent)
- Sinéad Crowley (Arts and Media correspondent)
- Paul Cunningham (Political correspondent), current This Week presenter
- David Davin-Power (Political correspondent)
- Jim Dougal (Northern editor)
- Jim Fahy (Western editor)
- Martina Fitzgerald (Political correspondent)
- Will Goodbody (Business editor), current Allied Irish Banks head of external communications
- Tommie Gorman (Northern editor)
- Orla Guerin (Europe correspondent) (later BBC)
- Cathy Halloran (Mid West correspondent)
- Fergal Keane (Northern Ireland correspondent) (later BBC)
- Donal Kelly (Political Editor)
- John Kilraine (London correspondent), current Nationwide correspondent
- Joe Little (Religious and Social Affairs correspondent)
- Mark Little (Washington correspondent & Prime Time presenter)
- Eileen Magnier (North West correspondent)
- David McCullagh (Political correspondent)
- Ingrid Miley (Industry and Employment correspondent)
- Ciaran Mullooly (Midlands correspondent) (later MEP)
- Jennie O'Sullivan (Southern reporter)
- Mary Regan (Political reporter), current political editor of the Irish Independent
- Michael Ryan (South East correspondent) (later presenter of Nationwide)
- Robert Shortt (Economics correspondent), current RTÉ company secretary
- Margaret Ward (Foreign Editor, China correspondent)
- Mary Wilson (Legal Affairs correspondent), former Drivetime presenter
- Teresa Mannion (Western Regional reporter)

=== RTÉ Sport newsreaders ===
- Eamon Horan
- Jacqui Hurley
- Paul O'Flynn

== Controversies ==
In March 2009, RTÉ was involved in controversy over a report about the placing of naked paintings of Taoiseach Brian Cowen in two Dublin Art Galleries. Initially, the station carried a television news report that displayed the pictures and treated the topic in a humorous light. However, after complaints from within the governing Fianna Fáil party, the station aired an apology to the Taoiseach.

In May 2011, RTÉ broadcast on a Prime Time Investigates programme allegations that the Roman Catholic Priest Kevin Reynolds raped and impregnated a Kenyan teenager. A scandal ensued when the allegations were discovered to be false, which generated intensive media coverage and political debate in Ireland, resulting in a government inquiry into the broadcaster.

In November 2020, during the COVID-19 pandemic, RTÉ apologised after several top news presenters and correspondents, including Bryan Dobson, David McCullagh, Miriam O'Callaghan, Eileen Dunne and Paul Cunningham, were photographed at a retirement party at RTÉ headquarters where social distancing was not fully observed. Taoiseach Micheál Martin described the photographs as "very disappointing". A month later, a health and safety review conducted by RTÉ into the gathering found that five breaches of COVID-19 protocols occurred, with up to 40 people present at the time.
