= Radio Kerry =

Radio station in County Kerry, Ireland

- Ireland
- Broadcast area: County Kerry, Ireland
- Frequencies: 96.2 MHz - 97.6 MHz, DAB

Programming
- Format: Adult Contemporary with local news, sports and specialist programmes

Ownership
- Owner: Radio Kerry Holdings

History
- First air date: 14 July 1990

Links
- Website: http://www.radiokerry.ie/

Radio Kerry is a full-service, licensed radio station that operates from the franchise area of County Kerry in southwest Ireland.

Radio Kerry was established in 1989 and began broadcasting on 14 July 1990. The station headquarters are in Tralee, the principal town of County Kerry, with a remote studio in Killarney. The original studios were based at Park View, Tralee, New Street, Killarney and The Barracks, Cahersiveen. In April 1995, Radio Kerry HQ moved to a custom-designed building in Tralee town centre with digital broadcasting, production and editing facilities incorporating a television studio. Shortly afterwards, the station moved its Killarney studio to Rock View, off High Street, Killarney and the Cahersiveen studio was re-located to the O'Connell Centre in the town. Today, there are approximately 70 people employed at the station in full-time, part-time and freelance positions.

== Broadcast ==
Radio Kerry broadcasts 24 hours a day, with a mix of live music and talk programmes between 7 am and 11 pm daily and music through the night from 1 am to 7 am. Many programmes are also broadcast from Radio Kerry's Killarney studio. The station broadcasts on five frequencies - 96.2, 96.6, 97.0, 97.2 and 97.6 MHz FM stereo throughout the county of Kerry. The station can also be picked up in parts of the surrounding counties of Cork, Limerick, Tipperary and Clare. The RDS PS (identification) is simply "Kerry". The station streams live online using the Windows Media Audio, aacPlus and MP3 formats. It was available on the DAB trial which was available in Dublin City and County and parts of the greater North East region. The multiplex which carried it was using a frequency licensed for all of Ireland. The trial ceased operating on Monday 1 December 2008.

Radio Kerry had an audience market share of 54% of all radio listeners in Kerry.

=== Frequencies ===
Frequency	Transmitter	Service area
96.2 MHz	Kilkeveragh	West Kerry
96.6 MHz	Tullig	Killarney
97.0 MHz	Mullaghanish	East Kerry
97.2 MHz	Knockmoyle	Tralee
97.6 MHz	Cnoc an Oir	North Kerry
97.6 MHz	Dingle Head	Dingle peninsula

== Development ==
In March 1999, Radio Kerry introduced an Outside Broadcast Unit which enabled the station to broadcast from towns and villages all over the county. In early 2005, the 6 broadcasting studios at Radio Kerry's Tralee Headquarters underwent a complete refurbishment. Also around this time there was a major investment to upgrade facilities at all 6 transmission sites. In June 2005, the new Radio Kerry Killarney studios were opened at Glebe Lane in the town. In September 2005, Radio Kerry completed the acquisition of Shannonside Northern Sound. This gave the Radio Kerry group access to the counties of Longford, Roscommon & South Leitrim through the Shannonside FM service and the counties of Cavan and Monaghan through the Northern Sound Radio service. Shannonside FM broadcast on 95.7, 97.2, 104.1, and 104.6 MHz. Northern Sound broadcast on 94.8, 96.3 and 97.5 MHz. Shannonside and Northern Sound have studios in Longford, Cavan and Monaghan and also stream live online using the Windows Media Audio format. As a result, the Radio Kerry group is now the largest independent radio group in Ireland. Radio Kerry's share of the commercial radio market in Ireland stands at 11%. The maximum market share allowed in Ireland by a single radio company is 17.9%. Early 2007 saw the introduction of a brand new outside broadcast unit. It contains the very latest in digital broadcasting and IP technology which allows programmes to be transmitted over PSTN, ISDN and satellite.

== Awards and recognition ==
Radio Kerry's programme presenters and producers have been awarded Jacob's Awards, Sony PPI Radio Advertising Awards for commercial production, ESB Community Games Awards for consistent commitment to community games reportage and McNamee Awards for its sports programmes. It has also received a BT award for technical innovation. In October 2005, Radio Kerry was named BCI/Phonographic Performance (Ireland) Limited (PPI) Irish Local Station of the Year. Radio Kerry has also been named Local Radio Station of the Year in 2007 and 2010. In December 2005, it received 1st place in the 2005 BCI New Adventures in Broadcasting Awards for the "Keys To The Kingdom" programme series which focused on the uniqueness of being from County Kerry. In October 2006, the Radio Kerry Sports Team were awarded a PPI Radio Award for Sports Coverage, in particular the way which All Ireland Gaelic Football Campaign of 2005 was brought to the listeners.

== Radio Kerry Training ==
Radio Kerry Training was established in September 2005. It designs and delivers targeted training packages for the radio sector and plays a role in identifying and developing new talent for entry-level positions in the industry. Primarily, Radio Kerry Training delivers the City and Guilds of London Institute Diploma in Media Techniques 7501 (Radio Production) radio broadcasting course, run in conjunction with FÁS - Ireland's Training and Development Authority.

== Charity ==
Among other projects, the Radio Kerry Bingo supports four charities.

== Sister Stations ==
Shannonside

Northern Sound
