= European Parliament Report =

Irish TV programme

- Genre: News and Current Affairs
- Presented by: Edel McAllister
- Country of origin: Ireland
- Original languages: English; Irish

Production
- Production locations: European Parliament, Strasbourg
- Camera setup: Multi-camera
- Running time: 30 minutes

Original release
- Network: RTÉ One; RTÉ News channel

Related
- RTÉ News

European Parliament Report is an Irish television programme broadcast on RTÉ One and the RTÉ News channel. It is produced by RTÉ News and Current Affairs and airs weekly on Sunday nights at around midnight usually after The Week in Politics. It features reports of recent happenings from the European Parliament in Strasbourg. It is filmed from inside the European Parliament buildings and usually features a panel of guests discussing the recent proceedings in parliament. The programme is presented by Edel McAllister.
