= North West Radio =

Former radio station in Ireland (1990–2004)

North West Radio (NWR) was a radio station that broadcast to south County Donegal, north County Leitrim and throughout County Sligo from 1990 to 2004. It was a sister station of MidWest Radio (MWR) and was replaced by Ocean FM. The station had studios in Sligo Town and Donegal Town.

Throughout its history, NWR topped listener polls and had won several high-profile awards. At the time of the removal of its license it was the most listened to local station in the Republic of Ireland, with a daily listenership figure of 64%.

The decision to give the license to Ocean FM was a controversial one and split the Broadcasting Commission of Ireland (BCI) three votes to three, with the chair casting the deciding vote in favour of the new station. The Commission argued that it had done so because the link up between NWR and MWR meant that not enough programmes were being produced by N.W.R. and that the station did little to attract younger listeners. These claims were denied by the CEO of NWR and MWR, Paul Claffey, who said that it amounted to Dublin telling people in the north west what kind of station they should listen to.

The decision was also unpopular with many of the residents of Counties Sligo and Leitrim, and a group to save the station was established and around 5,000 marched on the Dáil in Dublin demanding a reversal of the awarding of the license away from NWR.

Many people in the south of County Donegal would have preferred to have received Highland Radio from Letterkenny instead of N.W.R., or Ocean FM, for that matter, from Sligo Town.

North West Radio stopped broadcasting on midnight, 30 September 2004, with "Amhrán na bhFiann" being the last track played. An attempt to gain back the licence in 2014 under the name "Coast FM" proved unsuccessful
