= Charles Mitchel =

Irish actor and broadcaster

- Mitchel on his last news broadcast in 1984
- Born: Charles Gerald Mitchel; 8 November 1920; Monkstown, Dublin, Ireland
- Died: 18 August 1996 (aged 75); Donnybrook, Dublin, Ireland
- Education: Trinity College Dublin
- Occupations: Actor and newscaster
- Years active: 1961–1984
- Notable credit: RTÉ Nine O'Clock News
- Spouse: Betty Stubbs (m. 1949)
- Children: 2

Charles Gerald Anthony Mitchel (8 November 1920 – 18 August 1996) was an Irish actor and broadcaster, best known as an RTÉ television newscaster for almost 23 years.

== Early life ==
Born in Dublin, Mitchel was educated at Clongowes Wood College boarding school in Clane, County Kildare. Mitchel subsequently attended Trinity College Dublin where he studied forestry. It was here that his interest in acting developed and he quickly became a leading member of the Trinity Players. Mitchel left Trinity in 1947 without taking a degree. He immediately joined the Gate Theatre where he played with the Longford company until 1958. He was one of the founders of Irish Actors Equity and served as president of the Catholic Stage Guild.

== Broadcasting career ==
In 1961 Mitchel, joined the newly formed state television station, Telefís Éireann, as its first chief newsreader. His starting salary was £26 per week. Mitchel read the first bulletin on the network at 9.15pm on Sunday 31 December 1961.

He received numerous honours, including being awarded television personality of the year in December 1962 – he also became the first RTÉ presenter to win a Jacobs' Award.

As chief newsreader, Mitchel led a team of readers for the main evening bulletins including Andy O'Mahony, Maurice O'Doherty, Don Cockburn and in later years, Derek Davis and Anne Doyle. Mitchel retired from RTE on Thursday 8 November 1984 after presenting his last TV bulletin, the flagship Nine O'Clock News.

In 1989 he joined LMFM, a local radio station in Drogheda, County Louth, where he read the news and answered listeners' queries.

== Personal life ==
Mitchel was keenly interested in animal welfare and served as vice-president of the Irish Society for the Prevention of Cruelty to Animals for several years in the 1980s. He bred Basset Hounds and adjudicated at dog shows.

Mitchel married Elizabeth ('Betty') Stubbs on 9 May 1949 and they had two children, Nicholas and Susan. He died on 18 August 1996 at Bloomfield Nursing Home, Donnybrook and is buried at Glasnevin cemetery.
