= Irish Medical News =

- Ireland's leading medical newspaper
- Type: Weekly
- Founded: 1984
- Language: English
- City: Dublin
- Country: Ireland
- ISSN: 0790-2905
- Website: www.imn.ie

Irish Medical News is an independent quality bi-weekly newspaper for doctors and health professionals working in Ireland. It was established in 1984 as a 12-page newsletter and has since grown to a full-colour paper of between 48 and 64 pages. It is known for its strong news content and the quality of its writers and contributors. It has broken numerous exclusive health stories of national importance over the years. It was re-launched in March 2016 with a new look. Previous editors include RTÉ Health Correspondent, Fergal Bowers; current irishhealth.com editor Niall Hunter, Gary Finnegan, Donal Bergin and Priscilla Lynch.
