= Martina Fitzgerald (Irish journalist) =

Irish journalist

- Born: Kilskyre, Ireland
- Education: University College Dublin
- Occupations: CEO Scale Ireland; board director; former political journalist and author
- Years active: 2001-present

Martina Fitzgerald is CEO of Scale Ireland, the national representation body for tech start-ups and scale-ups. She is also a board member of Dóchas and the National Screening Advisory Committee.

== Career ==
Martina Fitzgerald has been CEO of Scale Ireland since 2020. She is also a member of the board of Dóchas and the National Screening Advisory Committee

She was a visiting fellow at Columbia University in New York in 2019, having previously delivered training to pre-university women in Laos in Southeast Asia and at Georgetown University for the US organisation, Running Start.

She has two decades senior communications experience having previously worked as a national political journalist. She is author of the best-selling book, Madam Politician (2018).

Fitzgerald was named as one of the most influential Irish journalists on Twitter in 2018.

She worked for RTÉ News and Current Affairs for 18 years including as Political Correspondent from October 2013 to December 2018.

From her base in Leinster House, Fitzgerald reported on all major political news stories including general elections in 2007, 2011 and 2016, as well as the marriage equality referendum in 2015 and Eighth Amendment referendum in 2018. Working on all RTÉ's flagship radio and television programmes including Morning Ireland and the Six One News, Fitzgerald also reported from Japan and Tanzania as well as covering the death of John Paul II, the London Bombings and Brexit from Madrid and London.

During the three months of negotiations that led to the formation of the Fine Gael/Independent minority coalition in 2016, Fitzgerald was a near permanent presence outside Government Buildings and was subjected to two 'video bombs' while live on air. She was widely praised for her professionalism in continuing with her broadcasts but, based on security concerns, RTÉ changed its policy for on-street political reporting.

RTÉ was widely criticised for not renewing Fitzgerald's contract as Political Correspondent in December 2018. It was later reported that Fitzgerald had engaged lawyers following which RTÉ reached a settlement with its former political correspondent.

== Madam Politician ==
Fitzgerald is the author of 'Madam Politician: The women at the table of Irish political power', published by Gill Books in October 2018. Former Supreme Court judge Catherine McGuinness launched the book in the National Library of Ireland.

Fitzgerald's book was a No.1 bestseller and received huge critical acclaim including being named Irish political book of the year in both the Sunday Business Post and the Irish Mail on Sunday. Other favourable reviews noted: 'Whether you have no interest in politics, or are fully engaged, this is an essential read’ (Sunday Independent); and ‘Fitzgerald’s fascinating work [does] not disappoint’ (Irish Examiner).

The Sunday Times described the book as a 'highly readable digest' based on Fitzgerald's interviews with 17 of the 19 women have been appointed to cabinet positions in the history of the Irish state, 'with the missing two being the late Eileen Desmond and Constance Markievicz. The fact that Markievicz's immediate successor as a female minister was Máire Geoghegan-Quinn, with 60 years of all-male cabinets between them, is one of the more stark illustrations of the paucity of female representation in Irish politics.'

Several well-known broadcasters praised the book including: ‘A fascinating read’ – Seán O’Rourke; 'It's a great book, a great read’ – Ray D’Arcy; and 'An absolute must' – Mark Cagney. Former Irish Times editor - and former Progressive Democrat TD - Geraldine Kennedy criticized the book's title, and claimed that ‘by accident or design it does a disservice’ to the former ministers and presidents interviewed by Fitzgerald. Kennedy's review was widely disparaged including by Irish Times political correspondent Harry Magee who told the Irish Times politics podcast: ‘I fundamentally disagree with the review. I thought it was quite vicious, and the premise on which it was based was wrong... I think she [Kennedy] was over the top.'

The hardback edition included endorsements from Emily O’Reilly, European Ombudsman, who described 'Madam Politician' as ‘a timely and important contribution to the contemporary reflection on women's historic and future place in Irish society and public life' while broadcaster Miriam O’Callaghan said it was ‘a compelling read that couldn’t be more timely.'

Novelist Cecelia Ahern praised Fitzgerald’s book in social media postings in December 2018: ‘Whether you’re interested in politics or not, this is a fascinating informative read... Thoroughly enjoying it & feeling inspired by the journeys of these remarkable women, many of whom I’ve known & admired since childhood.’

In interviews following its publication, Fitzgerald described the process of writing her book as 'gruelling and torturous.'

== Women in public life ==
Fitzgerald has spoken at numerous public events in Ireland as well as in Brussels, US and China about the role of women in public life. She was one of the contributors to a special Irish Times supplement marking the historical significance of the 1918 general election for Irish women.

She has also spoken about the importance of gender pay across all sectors not just in the media and has supported the idea of companies having to publish their pay data.

She delivered a TED Talk at Trinity College, Dublin on the topic of female under-representation in public life in 2019.

== Personal life ==
Fitzgerald grew up in Kilskyre in County Meath. She studied history and politics at UCD where she was Auditor of the Politics Society. She has a strong involvement with UCD including participating in the UCD Festival 2017 and the UCD Women in Leadership conference in 2018, 2019 and 2020. She is a member of the editorial board of UCD's alumni magazine, Connections.
