= Úna Claffey =

Irish former journalist and political adviser

- Born: 1947 (age 78–79); Dublin, Ireland
- Education: University College Dublin; Aix-Marseille University
- Occupations: Journalist, writer, political adviser
- Years active: 1977–2000
- Notable credit(s): Today Tonight; Morning Ireland; RTÉ News

Úna Claffey (born 1947) is an Irish former journalist and political adviser.

Born in Dublin, Claffey completed Bachelor of Arts in History, Ethics, Politics and Metaphysics from University College Dublin. She also studied politics in the United States and holds a diploma in French language and literature from Aix-Marseille University in Nice.

Claffey joined RTÉ in 1977 as a production assistant. In 1982 she joined Today Tonight as a reporter before taking over as host of Morning Ireland. Claffey later became a member of RTÉ's political team where she worked as a political correspondent based in Leinster House.

In 2000 Claffey was appointed political adviser to Taoiseach Bertie Ahern.
