= Shannonside Northern Sound =

Shannonside FM

Ireland
- Broadcast area: Counties Longford, Leitrim and Roscommon
- Frequencies: 104.1 MHz (Longford/Roscommon); 97.2 MHz (South Leitrim); 95.7 MHz (Boyle); 104.6 MHz (West Roscommon)

Programming
- Languages: English; Irish

Ownership
- Owner: Radio Kerry Holdings

History
- First air date: 1989

Links
- Webcast: Listen Live
- Website: ShannonSide FM

Northern Sound

Ireland
- Broadcast area: Counties Cavan & Monaghan
- Frequencies: 94.8 MHz (Cavan); 96.3 MHz (Monaghan); 97.5 MHz (Carrickmacross)

Programming
- Languages: English; Irish

Ownership
- Owner: Radio Kerry Holdings

History
- First air date: 1989

Links
- Webcast: Listen Live
- Website: Northern Sound

Shannonside Northern Sound is a dual radio franchise which operates across counties Cavan, Monaghan (Northern Sound Radio), Leitrim, Longford and Roscommon (Shannonside FM) in Ireland. It has a 46.9% market share.

== History ==
Shannonside FM and Northern Sound Radio were established in 1989 as separate radio stations. In 1995 both licences and franchise areas were combined to create the first regional station in Ireland. In 2005, Shannonside Northern Sound was purchased by Radio Kerry Holdings.

Several high-profile broadcasters started their careers at the station, including Damien O'Reilly, Ciaran Mullooly, Fran McNulty, Audrey Carville, Sinead Hussey, Justin Treacy, Niall Donnelly, Gareth O'Connor, Fintan Duffy and many others.

== Shows ==
The two stations have their own different schedules 7am-7pm weekdays, with the exception of The Joe Finnegan Show (9am – 11am). Outside of these times, the same programmes are broadcast across both stations.

== Premises ==
The franchise has 3 local bases:

Longford – Headquarters

Monaghan – studios, offices and broadcasting school, opened in October 2008

Cavan – studio and sales office, opened in July 2007

== Frequencies ==
Northern Sound Radio is broadcast on 96.3 MHz from Monaghan, 94.8 MHz from Cavan and 97.5 MHz from Carrickmacross. Shannonside FM is broadcast on 104.1 MHz (Longford/Roscommon), 97.2 MHz (South Leitrim), 95.7 MHz (Boyle), 104.6 MHz (West Roscommon).

== Sister Station ==
Radio Kerry
