= Will Goodbody =

Irish journalist

- Born: 1977; Wicklow, Ireland
- Education: Trinity College, Dublin; Dublin City University
- Occupation: Allied Irish Banks Head of External Communications
- Years active: 2001–present
- Notable credit(s): TV3 News; RTÉ News

Will Goodbody (born 1977) is an Irish former journalist, who has served as Head of External Communications at Allied Irish Banks since February 2025. He previously was the RTÉ News Business Editor from 2018 to 2025.

== Career ==
Goodbody began his journalism career in the print media as a markets reporter with the Sunday Business Post in 2000. The following year he made the move to television when he joined TV3 News. Over the following two years he worked as a general news reporter.

In 2003, Goodbody joined RTÉ News where he initially worked as a reporter and occasional editor on its flagship morning radio news programme, Morning Ireland on RTÉ Radio 1. In 2005 he moved to the news desk, from where he worked as a general news journalist in Dublin and around the country and part-time Deputy Programme Editor for RTÉ News. Goodbody was RTÉ's Science and Technology correspondent between 2013 and 2018.

In November 2018, it was announced that he would succeed David Murphy as the Business Editor for RTÉ News.

In December 2024, it was announced that Goodbody would leave RTÉ to join Allied Irish Banks as Head of External Communications from February 2025.

Media offices
Preceded by David Murphy	RTÉ News Business Editor; 2018–2025	Succeeded by Fergal O'Brien
