= Tommie Gorman =

Irish journalist (1956–2024)

- Born: 3 April 1956; County Sligo, Ireland
- Died: 25 June 2024 (aged 68)
- Education: Summerhill College; College of Journalism, Rathmines
- Occupation: Journalist
- Notable credit(s): RTÉ News (1980–2021); Europe Editor (1989–2001); Northern Editor (2001–2021); European of the Year (2001)
- Spouse: Ceara Roche
- Children: 2

Tommie Gorman (3 April 1956 – 25 June 2024) was an Irish journalist. He worked for RTÉ News from 1980 to 2021, where he was the former Northern Ireland editor.

Gorman was known for his personal interviews with figures such as Seán Quinn, Gerry Adams and Roy Keane, the latter following the 2002 Saipan incident. He retired in April 2021.

== Life and career ==
Gorman was born on 3 April 1956. He began his journalistic work with the Western People newspaper in County Mayo, where he worked for journalist John Healy. He joined RTÉ in 1980 and became North-West correspondent. In 1989, he moved to Brussels to become Europe Editor, and was appointed Northern Ireland Editor in 2001.

In 1989, Tommie featured in a report on RTÉ Regional correspondents presented by Eithne Hand.

Gorman also made several documentaries. Many of these were on a Northern Ireland topic.

Following the murder of Michaela McAreavey, Gorman went to Mauritius to cover the trial for RTÉ News.

In early 2021, it was announced that Gorman would retire in April 2021. On 25 June 2024, Gorman died at the age of 68.

== Interviews ==
He risked a massive $3,000 on hiring a helicopter to trace Seamus Heaney in Athens when he won the 1995 Nobel Prize in Literature - the ploy worked.

Gorman was known for the 2002 interview with Republic of Ireland footballer Roy Keane after he quit in the build-up to the 2002 FIFA World Cup during which Gorman begged Keane to return. The interview was broadcast over a half-hour of television on 27 May 2002. It was the top television programme of May 2002, beating even coverage of the country's general election which had been held ten days earlier. Details of the interview were later circulated outside Ireland. Afterwards Gorman said Keane was "deeply emotional".

In January 2009, Gorman conducted an interview with Seán Quinn. The interview was a rare appearance in the media by Quinn. When the Quinn Group posted the interview on YouTube, “Publicity-shy tycoon jumps on YouTube bandwagon” the video attracted 28 views, including two carried out for research purposes by the Irish Independent.

In December 2009, Gorman conducted a 29-minute interview with Gerry Adams, the President of Sinn Féin. The interview contained references to Adams's personal life and family background, including child abuse allegations surrounding family members.

== Awards and honours ==
Gorman was awarded European of the Year in 2001 for his work on radio and television reports on EU institutions. The award was presented to him in Dublin by President of Ireland Mary McAleese.

Gorman was given an honorary master's degree by NUI Galway in October 2009.

== Earnings ==
In 2005 Gorman was ninth in RTÉ's top earners list, with a salary of €200,367. He offered a pay freeze in February 2009.

Media offices
Preceded by David Davin-Power	RTÉ News Northern Editor; 2001–2021	Succeeded by Vincent Kearney
