= Oireachtas Report =

- Presented by: Edel McAllister, Ailbhe Conneely and Conor McMorrow
- Starring: 33rd Dáil, 26th Seanad, President of Ireland
- Country of origin: Ireland

Original release
- Network: RTÉ One
- Release: present

Related
- European Parliament Report

Oireachtas Report is an Irish political television programme broadcast on RTÉ One. Presented by Edel McAllister, Ailbhe Conneely and Conor McMorrow one per edition, it transmits nightly highlights of that day's proceedings in the national parliament of Ireland, known as the Oireachtas.
