= Paul O'Flynn (journalist) =

Irish television reporter

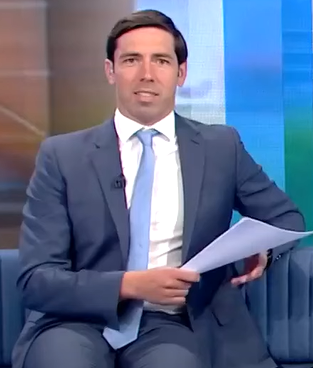
- O'Flynn in 2020
- Born: 12 January 1981 (age 45)
- Education: Dublin City University (B.A.) (M.A.)
- Occupations: Journalist, news presenter
- Employer: RTÉ
- Notable credit: RTÉ News
- Spouse: Mary Regan (m. 2012)
- Children: 2

Paul O'Flynn (born 12 January 1985) is an Irish journalist employed by RTÉ, Ireland's national radio and television station, where he currently works as a news and sport presenter for RTÉ News.

== Career ==
O'Flynn often uses creative means to tell his stories to viewers, such as slurping noodles for a broadcast during the 2019 Rugby World Cup. He was filmed diving into the sea at Sandycove's Forty Foot on 20 May 2020 in a news report about government COVID-19 pandemic restrictions on public swimming being eased, with the footage being broadcast at 1 pm that afternoon then being pulled when Dún Laoghaire–Rathdown County Council told RTÉ it was "promoting a prohibited act".

O'Flynn has been involved in swimming since he was four years of age, won the 2018 Liffey Swim and is also a water polo enthusiast. He has membership of the Half Moon Swimming Club.

== Personal life ==
O'Flynn graduated from Dublin City University with a BA in journalism and an MA in International Relations. He is married to Mary Regan, who also works for RTÉ News. They have two children.
