= Ocean FM (Ireland) =

Radio station in northwest Ireland

Ireland
- Broadcast area: South Donegal, North Leitrim and Sligo
- Frequencies: 94.7MHz (Ballyshannon); 102.5MHz (Truskmore); 103.0MHz (Glencolumbkille); 105.0MHz (Barnesmore)

Programming
- Languages: English; Irish (Connacht Irish and Ulster Irish)

Ownership
- Owner: North West Broadcasting Ltd

History
- First air date: 1 October 2004

Links
- Website: oceanfm.ie

Ocean FM is a local radio station that broadcasts to parts of the northwest of Ireland. The station covers the area of south County Donegal, north County Leitrim and most of County Sligo and it broadcasts into parts of south-west County Fermanagh. It started broadcasting on 1 October 2004, replacing North West Radio (NWR). The station broadcasts from Collooney (County Sligo)

Locally owned and locally operated, Ocean FM serves all adults in County Sligo, South Donegal and North Leitrim. Their shareholders include many of the leading businesspeople and sports personalities in the region. They broadcast news, sports, current affairs, special interest programmes across parts of the northwest.

Ocean FM covers sports events across the region with live commentary at key matches involving teams from all three counties. The service is streamed live over the internet on web stream, Twitter and Facebook.

== See also ==
- Pauric McShea, match analyst
