= RTÉ News on Two =

- On-screen logo 9 February 2009
- Also known as: Newsnight (1978–1988); Network News (1988–1997); News2 (1997–2004)
- Genre: News and current affairs
- Presented by: Eileen Whelan; Aengus Mac Grianna; Una O'Hagan
- Country of origin: Republic of Ireland
- Original language: English

Production
- Production location: Donnybrook, Dublin
- Editors: Lynsey Kiely, Bethan Kilfoil, Paul Tanney & Aisling Bastable
- Camera setup: Single camera
- Running time: 10–22 minutes

Original release
- Network: RTÉ Two
- Release: 2 November 1978 – 18 September 2014

Related
- News Feed; RTÉ News: Six One; RTÉ News: Nine O'Clock

RTÉ News on Two is a late-night news programme that aired each Monday to Thursday on Irish public television channel RTÉ Two between 2 November 1978 and 18 September 2014. The transmission time of this programme varied each night, but it generally aired between 22:45 and 23:30. Until 4 January 2013, the programme was broadcast every Monday to Thursday, lasting 22 minutes, reducing to ten minutes after this date. A world weather forecast followed each broadcast.

RTÉ News on Two took a different agenda to other RTÉ News and Current Affairs programmes. Its content was customised for a younger audience, and presenters and journalists tend to use more informal language on the programme. From 2 October 2006 the bulletin was presented by Eileen Whelan, following the departure of Anthony Murnane, who was with the programme from the beginning. Eamonn Falvey edited the programme from 2 April 2007 until December 2009. Gareth O'Connor was the programme editor until 2010. It was mainly presented by Eileen Whelan, Aengus Mac Grianna and Una O'Hagan.

From 5 March 2007 until 18 September 2014, RTÉ News on Two was streamed live on the internet and archive shows are available to view through the RTÉ website. For the duration of the 2011 general election campaign, RTÉ News on Two in its regular format was only aired on Thursday night, with a reformatted programme, The Eleventh Hour, airing Monday-Wednesday (with a short RTÉ News on Two extended summary airing beforehand).

== History ==
The programme began as Newsnight in 1978 and was usually the last programme of the day during RTÉ 2's first ten years on the air. It was largely an international news service with reports from BBC News, ITN, ABC News, CBS News and other American networks.

On 3 October 1988, RTÉ 2 relaunched as Network 2, and their news programme was relaunched as Network News. It was a regular RTÉ News bulletin but the new name reflected the new name of the channel it was broadcast on.

In 1997, as part of RTÉ's revamp of Network 2 as "N2", the programme was completely changed and renamed News 2. News 2 was presented by Sharon Ní Bheoláin (who had presented Nuacht RTÉ for a number of years) and Anthony Murnane. Both presenters would present alternating weeks, with another presenter for the sports news. Unlike RTÉ News on RTÉ One, News 2 was presented from a green screen studio, the presenters sat on high stools, the main news presenter would sit on the right with the sports presenter on the left at different desks.

In 2003, RTÉ began another rebranding exercise and choose to highlight what channels they own, hence N2 was relaunched as RTÉ N2 (however continuity referred to the channel as RTÉ Network 2). The RTÉ Network 2 news programme was restored to the regular RTÉ News look and branding (as RTÉ News on Two), and now broadcasts from the regular RTÉ News studio, but many of the innovations of News 2 and the younger agenda remain. For example, the presenter usually stands to introduce the first story.

The series was replaced by two early evening bulletins called News Feed on 22 September 2014, which ran until January 2017.

Late-night news programme aired on both RTÉ One and RTÉ News Now on Friday and Saturday nights after the final prime time programme of the evening (e.g. The Late Late Show, Kenny Live, Tubridy Tonight).

There are no morning or late night news bulletins on any RTÉ channel.

== See also ==
Other RTÉ News and Current Affairs programmes include:

- RTÉ News: One O'Clock
- RTÉ News: Six One
- RTÉ News: Nine O'Clock
