= Maurice O'Doherty =

Irish broadcaster (1932–1998)

- Born: Maurce O'Doherty; 17 November 1932; Limerick, Ireland
- Died: 5 April 1998 (aged 65); Dublin, Ireland
- Education: St. Flannan's College, Ennis
- Occupation: Newsredaer
- Years active: 1962–1984
- Notable credit: RTÉ News
- Spouse: Phyl Savage
- Children: 4

Maurice O'Doherty (17 November 1932 – 5 April 1998) was an Irish broadcaster best known as a newsreader for RTÉ News from 1966 until 1983. As a contemporary of Charles Mitchel the two men made the Nine O'Clock News the most watched news programme on Irish television.

== Early life ==
The son of a member of the Garda Síochána from Donegal, O'Doherty was born in Limerick in 1932. He was educated locally before later boarding at St. Flannan's College in Ennis. After completing his secondary schooling O'Doherty worked with the state transport provider CIÉ at Foynes before joining Met Éireann in Shannon. It was here that he developed an interest in acting and he became a key member of the College Players in Limerick. In 1961 O'Doherty was transferred to Met Éireann's Central Analysis and Forecasting Office in Dublin.

== Broadcasting career ==
After moving to Dublin O'Doherty applied for a position as an announcer with Radio Éireann and was accepted. He started out presenting music shows such as Hospital Requests and Today in the Dáil. During a newspaper strike in 1966 he was invited to read both radio and television news bulletins. Over the next two decades he became one of the most recognised faces and voices in Irish broadcasting. His unscripted and humorous asides that he would slip into his bulletins also became popular, much to the ire of the RTÉ authorities. He also became famous for announcing the death of Éamon de Valera on RTÉ on 29 August 1975. In 1983 O'Doherty announced his retirement from the state broadcaster, blaming bad working conditions. He subsequently toured the country as a comedy act before moving to Paris.

== Private life ==
O'Doherty was married to theatre producer Philomena "Phyl" Savage (d. 27 August 2005) whom he met during his earlier acting days in Limerick. The couple had four children, Cahir, Sharon, Ewan and Fearga.

== Death ==
O'Doherty died at the Adelaide Hospital in Dublin on 5 April 1998 aged 65. He had been suffering from cancer. In keeping with his dry sense of humour his epitaph reads "I'm sorry, I'll read that again."
