= David Davin-Power =

Irish journalist (1952–2024)

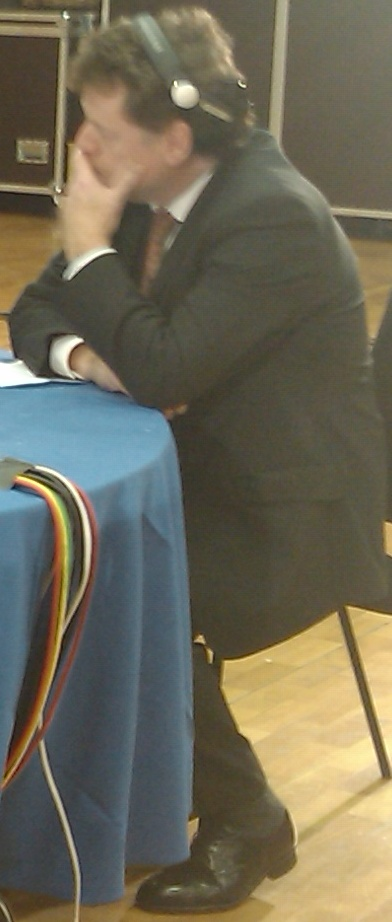
- Davin-Power in 2009
- Born: 24 April 1952; Portobello, Dublin, Ireland
- Died: 31 October 2024 (aged 72); Glasnevin, Dublin, Ireland
- Occupation: Journalist
- Employer: RTÉ News
- Spouses: Christine Bowen (divorced); Dearbhla Collins (m. 2001)
- Children: 5

David Davin-Power (24 April 1952 – 31 October 2024) was an Irish journalist, best known for his work as a political correspondent with RTÉ News.

== Career ==
Davin-Power was one of the first presenters of Morning Ireland, along with David Hanly. He was also a former Northern Ireland Editor for RTÉ News and Current Affairs. In the early 1990s, he served as the head of news for the now-defunct Century Radio.

In August 2001, Davin-Power was made a political correspondent at RTÉ. In March 2009, he made an appearance on RTÉ News: Nine O'Clock from the Fianna Fáil Ardfheis, surrounded by members of the party glaring at the camera.

In 2015, Davin-Power co-presented the RTÉ documentary Gallipoli – Ireland's Forgotten Heroes, discussing the World War I campaign from an Irish perspective.

In 2018, Davin-Power was an award adjudicator for the Mayo Association of Dublin.

== Personal life and death ==
Davin-Power was born in Portobello, Dublin on 24 April 1952 and was educated at University College Dublin. He was married to Dearbhla Collins since 2001, the sister of Finghin Collins, and previously to Christine Bowen. He had five children, three from his first marriage and two from his second.

Having been ill since March, Davin-Power died at the Bon Secours Hospital, Dublin on 31 October 2024, aged 72.
