= Charlie Bird =

Irish journalist and broadcaster (1949–2024)

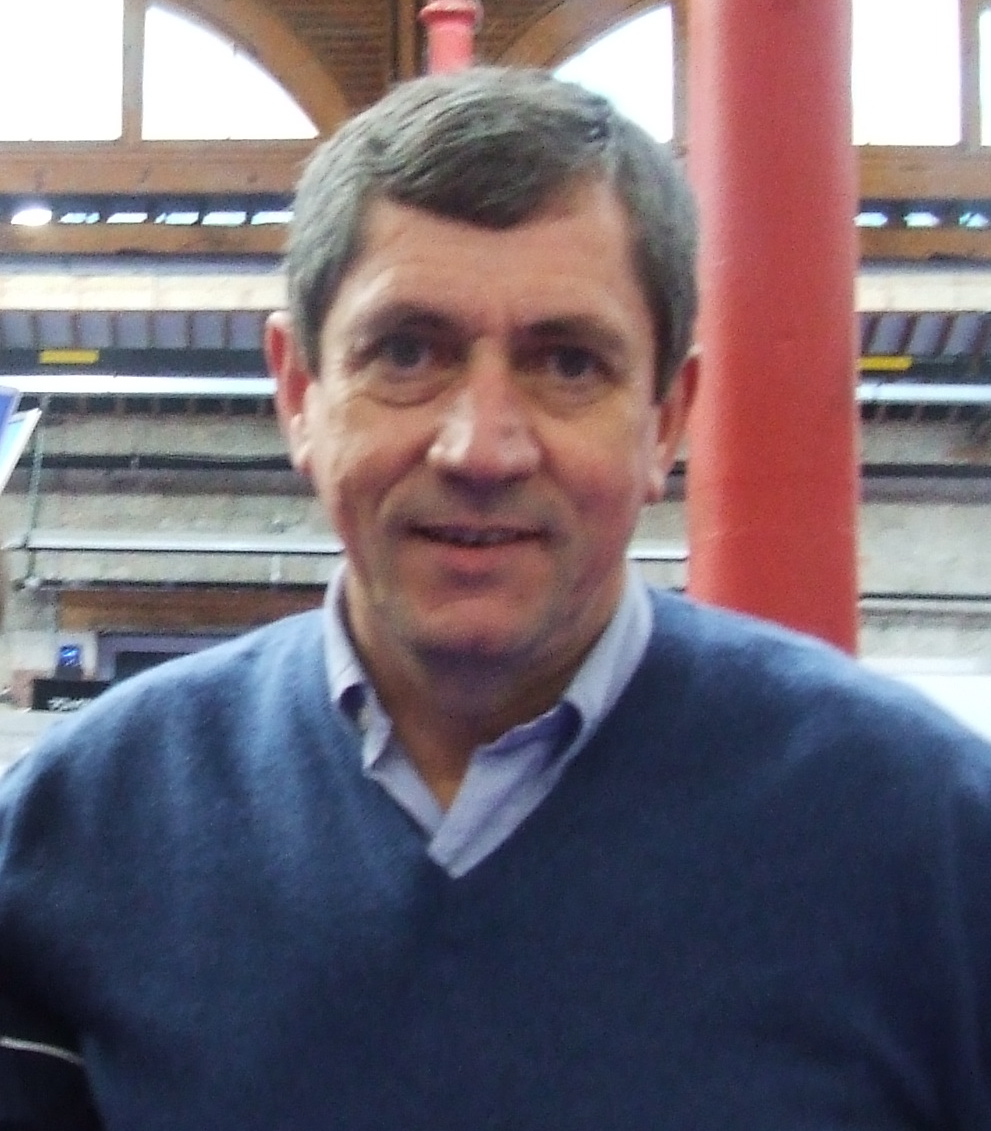
- Bird in 2007
- Born: 9 September 1949; Sandymount, Dublin, Ireland
- Died: 11 March 2024 (aged 74); Magheramore, County Wicklow, Ireland
- Education: Sandymount High School
- Occupation: Journalist
- Notable credit: RTÉ News
- Spouses: Mary O'Connor (m. 1974; div. 1998); Claire Mould (m. 2016)
- Children: 2

Charles Brown Bird (9 September 1949 – 11 March 2024) was an Irish journalist and broadcaster. He was Chief News Correspondent with RTÉ News until January 2009. He took up the role of Washington Correspondent, but prematurely returned to his earlier post in Ireland in June 2010. He retired from RTÉ in August 2012.

== Early life ==
Charles Brown Bird was born in Sandymount, Dublin on 9 September 1949. (Note: In his semi-autobiography This Is Charlie Bird, he states he has two birth certificates, one saying he was born 4 September 1949, the other 9 September 1949. He chooses to celebrate his birthday on 9 September.) He was educated at Sandymount High School.

In the late 1960s, Bird took an active interest in far-left politics, being a member of Young Socialists. In this role, along with Tariq Ali of the International Marxist Group, he attended the funeral of Peter Graham of Saor Éire who was assassinated on 25 October 1971 in an internecine dispute. A photograph of the funeral shows Ali and Bird giving a clenched fist salute at the grave.

In the early 1970s, Bird joined Official Sinn Féin (later Sinn Féin: the Workers' Party). In 1973, he was their director of elections in Dublin South-Central, but in 2022, he claimed he left shortly thereafter and had only been involved with the party for a few months. Subsequently, Bird was recruited into RTÉ by Workers' Party member Eoghan Harris in the mid-1970s.

For a period, Bird was a member of the Labour Party but left after Noël Browne walked out of the party following the 1977 Labour party conference in Cork. (Note: Browne was against the decision by Labour to form an election pact with Fine Gael that the two would form a coalition together if they got the votes.)

== Career ==
=== 1990s ===
Bird began his career in RTÉ as a writer responding to fan mail for a children's show, and later became a researcher before moving into a position in the newsroom in 1980. For many years in the 1990s, Bird was the only point of contact between RTÉ and the Provisional IRA. He witnessed first-hand the ceasefires and the subsequent twists and turns of the peace process. On the international front, Bird reported on the Gulf War and was in Syria for the release of Brian Keenan in 1990. He covered the outbreak of the Somali Civil War in the early 90s and the Rwandan genocide in 1994.

In 1998, Bird and his colleague George Lee broke the story about a tax evasion scheme being operated by National Irish Bank, in which the bank was offering customers looking to avoid tax offshore investment schemes in the Isle of Man. For this, both men were awarded "Journalist of the Year".

While the NIB story represented a professional highpoint, the aftermath represented a low one; "the worst time of my life" as Bird described it in 2006. During his coverage of the NIB story, Bird reported that Beverley Flynn had assisted clients of the bank in evading tax by funnelling undeclared income to Clerical Medical schemes based in the Isle of Man. Flynn denied the claims and sued RTÉ for libel. What followed was "the longest-running libel case in the history of the state". The matter went to the Irish High Court in 2001; a jury found that while RTÉ was unable to prove its case, they also stated that the allegations levelled against Flynn were substantially true. Thus, Flynn was judged to have "won" the case, but was awarded no damages. Flynn appealed the matter to the Supreme court, but lost, but continued to legally pursue the matter. The issue was never fully settled until 2007, when RTÉ agreed to settle with Flynn to the sum of €1.24 million. That became a controversy in itself, with the public outraged that ultimately the taxpayer would have to foot such a steep bill, as well as accusations that Taoiseach Bertie Ahern was involved and had encouraged RTÉ to settle.

=== 2000s ===
In the early 2000s, Bird covered a number of major international news stories for RTÉ News such as the September 11 attacks in New York and the 2004 Indian Ocean earthquake and tsunami. He also covered domestic stories such as a 2004 horse-doping scandal including Cian O'Connor and the story of the Colombia Three, three Irish Republicans charged with providing training to FARC rebels.

Bird was awarded an Honorary Degree of Doctor of Laws from University College Dublin in 2004.

Bird was attacked during the Dublin riots of 25 February 2006, suffering a fractured cheekbone, soft tissue damage and bruising. On RTÉ News broadcasts later that evening, he spoke of his personal experience—and of how his assailants had recognised him and called him an "Orange Bastard". Witnesses included Sunday Independent journalist Daniel McConnell, who reported on the event the following day. Bird's appearance on the Six O'Clock News was criticised by The Sunday Times in its edition the following day, as it felt "Bird makes himself the story". In 2008, a man pleaded guilty to violent disorder and assaulting Bird.

Bird presented the Charlie Bird Explores series in 2006, 2007 and 2008. In this collection of documentary programmes, he visited the Amazon, the Ganges, and the Arctic.

On 7 October 2008, Bird was announced to become the RTÉ News and Current Affairs Washington correspondent in January 2009. His first report as Washington correspondent was on the Nine O'Clock bulletin about US Airways Flight 1549. RTÉ received 30 complaints after he "failed to wear a suit and tie" on Six One during coverage of the death of Ted Kennedy.

=== 2010s ===
Bird provided coverage from the 2010 Haiti earthquake in January 2010. A two-part documentary about his first year in the United States was broadcast later that month on RTÉ One. In it he spoke of his "madness" in moving to the country and his lack of contacts and recognition in Washington DC. At the end of the second programme, he announced he would vacate his Washington post. Early viewing figures suggested that the two programmes got viewing averages of 473,000 and 563,000 people. RTÉ cited Bird's "popularity" when asked about the large audience.

Bird returned to Ireland to take up his previous job of Chief News Correspondent with RTÉ in June 2010. He covered a high-profile leadership challenge of Enda Kenny on his return. The Washington role was filled by Richard Downes. During August 2010, Bird began presenting The Marian Finucane Show. Bird retired from RTÉ on 26 August 2012; his last broadcast was presenting The Marian Finucane Show on RTÉ Radio 1.

Bird presented Tonight with Vincent Browne on TV3 between 29 August and 1 September 2016.

In 2016, he published A Day in May in response to the Thirty-fourth Amendment of the Constitution of Ireland. In 2018, sections of this publication were used as part of a play by the same name in the Olympia Theatre, Dublin.

== Personal life, illness and death ==
In 1974, he married Mary O'Connor, and they had two daughters. They divorced in 1998. In 2016, he married Claire Mould.

On 27 October 2021, Bird announced that he had developed motor neurone disease, after experiencing problems with his voice. He subsequently announced "Climb For Charlie", a campaign where he and other celebrities would climb Croagh Patrick to raise awareness of the condition.

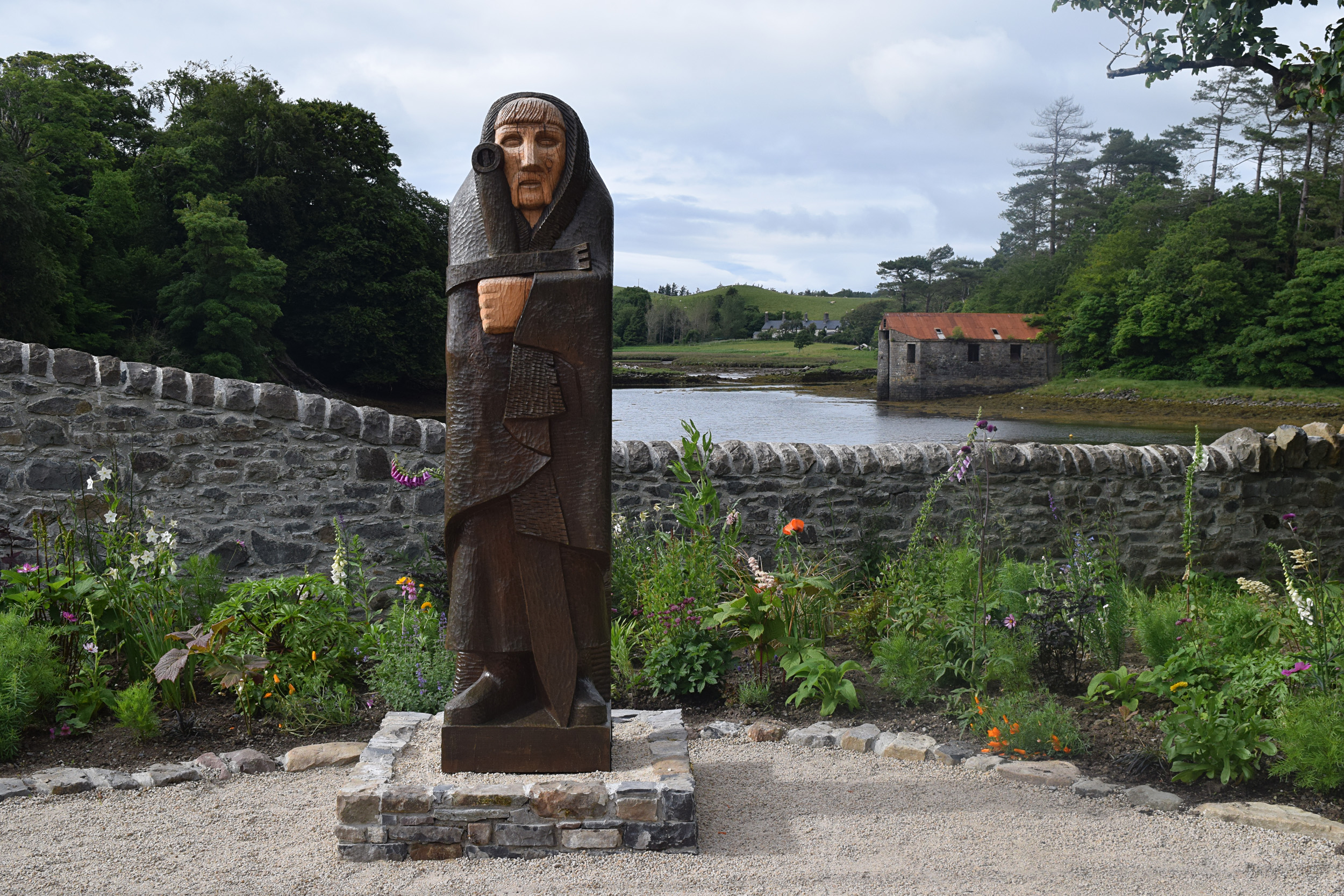
An Saighdiúir statue at the quay entrance of Westport House

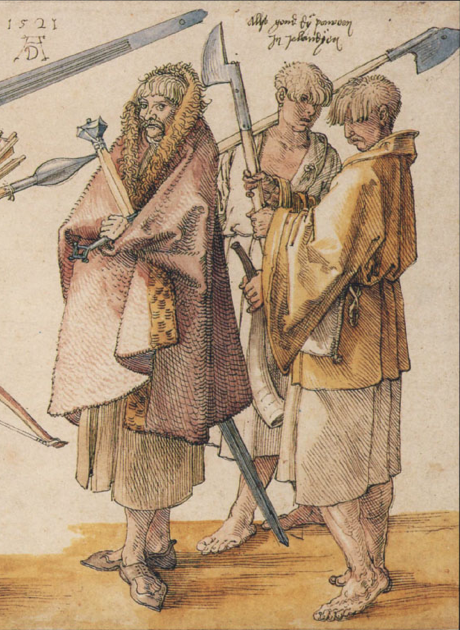
Illustration by Albrecht Dürer upon which the statue was based

In April 2022, after completing the "Climb with Charlie", Bird donated a wooden sculpture to Westport House to thank the local community. The piece, titled An Saighdiúir (The Soldier), was created by Wicklow sculptor Seighean Ó Draoi. Standing eight feet tall and carved from Lebanese Cedar, it represents an ancient Irish soldier. The design was influenced by a 1521 work of German artist Albrecht Dürer depicting Irish fighters in Europe, and also draws on the history of dispossessed Irish known as Kerns and Tories, who resisted English settlement in the 16th century. Bird, accompanied by his wife Claire and their dog Tiger, presented the sculpture at the Quay entrance to Westport House. It was accepted by Harry and Cathal Hughes, owners of the estate, along with estate and construction manager Michael King. The donation followed Bird's fundraising climb of Croagh Patrick in 2021, which raised more than €3.6 million for the Irish Motor Neurone Disease Association and Pieta House.

On 12 June 2022, the Sunday World reported that Bird had selected his burial place. On 23 August 2023, he entered home hospice care. He died on 11 March 2024, aged 74.

== Notes ==
Media offices
Preceded by Robert Shortt	RTÉ News Washington Correspondent; 2009–2010	Succeeded by Richard Downes
