= Don Cockburn =

Irish journalist and presenter

- Born: 13 March 1930; Dublin, Ireland
- Died: 4 September 2017 (aged 87); Dublin, Ireland
- Education: Synge Street CBS, Dublin
- Occupation: Newsreader
- Years active: 1958–1992
- Notable credit(s): RTÉ News, Nine O'Clock News
- Spouse: Marie Scully
- Children: 2

Donald Cockburn (13 March 1930 – 4 September 2017) was an Irish journalist, presenter and newsreader. He is best known as a long-serving newsreader for Raidió Teilifís Éireann (RTÉ), who anchored the broadcaster's main evening television news programmes during over thirty years of service.

Cockburn was educated at Synge Street CBS, later studying Russian and Spanish at Trinity College Dublin at night after receiving a dispensation from Archbishop John Charles McQuaid to do so.

He originally joined RTÉ as a part-time announcer in 1958, and was made a full-time employee in 1972. He was formerly employed in Dublin Corporation as head of wages in the engineering department.

He retired twenty years later on 15 December 1992, having served as a newsreader for many years. His was known for cycling to RTÉ's Montrose Studios every day.

He died on 4 September 2017.
