= Eamon Horan =

Irish sports journalist

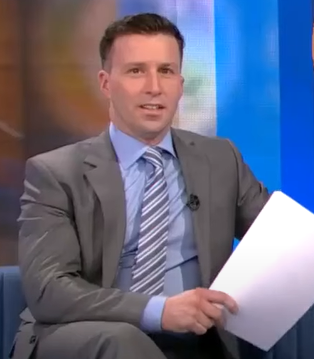
- Horan in 2020
- Born: Eamon Horan; 1975 (age 50–51); Ballycumber, County Offaly
- Occupation: Sports journalist
- Years active: 1992–present
- Employer: Raidió Teilifís Éireann (RTÉ)
- Notable credit: RTÉ News: Six One
- Children: 3

Eamon Horan (born 1975) is an Irish sports journalist employed by Raidió Teilifís Éireann (RTÉ), Ireland's national radio and television station, where he currently works for RTÉ Sport as a sports news presenter on RTÉ News: Six One.

== Career ==
Horan began his broadcasting career with Midlands 103 in 1992. He worked for KISS fm in Boston and WKLB-FM in Massachusetts in 1995.

In 2008, Horan filled in as the presenter of The RTÉ 2fm Breakfast Show with Caroline Morahan. In 2007, he reported on the World Athletics Championships in Osaka, Japan. He also reported on the London Paralympic Games in 2012 and the postponed Tokyo 2020 Paralympic Games.

== Personal life ==
Horan is a native of Ballycumber, County Offaly. He graduated from University College Galway in 1997 with a higher diploma in communications.

Horan is married to Nicola Anderson, a journalist with the Irish Independent and together they have three children.

On 2 April 2020, during the COVID-19 pandemic, Horan supported the launch of HSE Midlands's video campaign appealing to the public to continue supporting those in frontline services.
