= Clare FM =

Irish radio station

Coordinates: 52°50′43.94″N 8°58′39.06″W

County Clare; Ireland
- Frequencies: 95.2–96.6 MHz, DAB

Programming
- Format: Adult contemporary with local news, sports and specialist programmes

Ownership
- Owner: Clare Community Radio Holdings

History
- First air date: 10 September 1989

Links
- Website: http://www.clare.fm/

Clare FM is an Irish radio station which broadcasts to County Clare and the surrounding areas.

The station has won many Irish radio awards. Clare FM broadcasts on frequencies 95 – 96FM including 95.2, 95.5, 95.9, 96.4 & 96.6. In the past, it also provided an opt-out service.

In January 2019, it was announced that the station was sold to Radio Kerry Holdings. In July 2019, the proposed sale fell through following a breakdown during the negotiations.

A history on the beginning of the commercial radio station was released in 2019. 'Launching Clare FM' was written by Ger Sweeney, the first presenter to speak on the Clare FM airwaves.

== Frequencies ==
Frequency (MHz)	Transmitter	Service area
95.2	Ennistymon	Ennistymon, Lahinch
95.5	Burren Hill	southwest County Clare
95.9	Woodcock Hill	southeast County Clare
96.4	Maghera	County Clare
96.6	Killaloe	Killaloe and Ballina
