= 2019 in Irish television =

| List of years in Irish television | (table) |
- … 2009; 2010; 2011; 2012; 2013; 2014; 2015; 2016; 2017; 2018; 2019; 2020; 2021; 2022; 2023; 2024; 2025; 2026; 2027; 2028; 2029 …
- Art; Archaeology; Architecture; Literature; Music; Philosophy; Science; +...

The following is a list of events relating to television in Ireland from 2019.

== Events ==
- 2 February – The second series of Ireland's Got Talent debuts on Virgin Media One.
- 15 February – To coincide with the launch of RTÉ2 +1, RTÉ One +1 begins broadcasting 24 hours a day. Previously it had only broadcast from 7pm to 2am.
- 19 February – Launch of the timeshift channel RTÉ2+1.
- 8 March –
  - Sarah McTernan is announced by RTÉ as the Irish representative for the Eurovision Song Contest 2019 in Tel Aviv, Israel, where she will perform the song "22".
  - The Friday evening edition of Virgin Media One's The 6 O'Clock Show is replaced by Xposé.
- 24 March – Mairead Ronan and dance partner John Nolan win the third series of Dancing with the Stars.
- 27 March – Virgin Media announces that its partnership with Sky's AdSmart will to go live in Ireland in the final quarter of the year.
- 7 April – BSD win the second series of Ireland's Got Talent.
- 16 May – Sarah McTernan becomes the fifth Irish act in six years to not reach the Eurovision Song Contest final, when she is among the semi-finalists who are not selected for the final.
- 23 June – The Sunday Independent reports that the Broadcasting Authority of Ireland has recommended that on-demand television services broadcasting in Ireland should pay a levy to do so.
- 25 June – Pensioners stage a protest outside the BBC studios in Belfast and Derry following the BBC's decision to end universal free UK television licenses for those aged 75 and over, a decision that will affect those living in Northern Ireland.
- 28 June – Veteran presenter Gay Byrne is honoured with the Ireland-US Council's Lifetime Achievement Award at a ceremony at Dublin Castle, but is unable to attend the event due to a broken wrist and chest infection.
- 15 August – Eir Sport and Virgin Media Sport contract a deal to show Virgin Media Sport on eir Vision and eir Sport 1 on Virgin Media Ireland.
- 12 September – Virgin Media Sport HD launches on Sky on channel 422.
- 4 October – Virgin Media One launches a new weekday schedule, which sees Ireland AM extended by an extra hour, running from 7.00am – 11.00am, replacing the simulcast of ITV's This Morning. Ireland AM is followed by Elaine.
- 4 November – The death is announced of veteran broadcaster Gay Byrne, who presented The Late Late Show for 37 years.
- 7 November – It is announced that Aertel will be shut down as part of cost-cutting measures at RTÉ.
- 12 November – It is confirmed that Pasquale La Rocca will join the fourth series of Dancing with the Stars as a professional dancer.
- 14 December – Golfer Shane Lowry is named the 2019 RTÉ Sports Person of the Year.
- 15 December – The McSharry family from County Sligo, coached by Donncha O'Callaghan, win season seven of Ireland's Fittest Family.
- 31 December – Rob and Marian Heffernan and their family win the 2019 Christmas celebrity special of Ireland's Fittest Family together with €10,000 for their charity of choice.

== Debuts ==
- 6 January – Resistance on RTÉ One (miniseries) (2019)
- 17 September – Adventure Time on TG4 (2010–2018)

== Changes of network affiliation ==
| Shows | Moved from | Moved to |
|---|---|---|
| Fireman Sam | RTÉjr | Virgin Media Three |

== Ongoing television programmes ==
=== 1960s ===
- RTÉ News: Nine O'Clock (1961–present)
- RTÉ News: Six One (1962–present)
- The Late Late Show (1962–present)

=== 1970s ===
- The Late Late Toy Show (1975–present)
- The Sunday Game (1979–present)

=== 1980s ===
- Fair City (1989–present)
- RTÉ News: One O'Clock (1989–present)

=== 1990s ===
- Would You Believe (1990s–present)
- Winning Streak (1990–present)
- Prime Time (1992–present)
- Nuacht RTÉ (1995–present)
- Nuacht TG4 (1996–present)
- Ros na Rún (1996–present)
- TV3 News (1998–present)
- Ireland AM (1999–present)
- Telly Bingo (1999–present)

=== 2000s ===
- Nationwide (2000–present)
- TV3 News at 5.30 (2001–present) – now known as the 5.30
- Against the Head (2003–present)
- news2day (2003–present)
- Other Voices (2003–present)
- Saturday Night with Miriam (2005–present)
- The Week in Politics (2006–present)
- At Your Service (2008–present)
- Operation Transformation (2008–present)
- 3e News (2009–present)
- Dragons' Den (2009–present)
- Two Tube (2009–present)

=== 2010s ===
- Jack Taylor (2010–present)
- Mrs. Brown's Boys (2011–present)
- MasterChef Ireland (2011–present)
- Today (2012–present)
- The Works (2012–present)
- Celebrity MasterChef Ireland (2013–present)
- Second Captains Live (2013–present)
- Claire Byrne Live (2015–present)
- The Restaurant (2015–present)
- Red Rock (2015–present)
- TV3 News at 8 (2015–present)
- Ploughing Live (2015–present)
- First Dates (2016–present)
- Dancing with the Stars (2017–present)
- The Tommy Tiernan Show (2017–present)
- Striking Out (2017–present)

== Ending this year ==
- 4 October – Xposé (2007–2019)

== Deaths ==
- 14 March – Pat Laffan, 79, actor
- June – Tom Jordan, actor (Fair City)
- 11 July – Brendan Grace, 68, comedian and singer (Father Ted)
- 14 July – Karl Shiels, 47, actor (Fair City)
- 23 July – Danika McGuigan, 33, actress
- 4 November – Gay Byrne, 85, broadcaster (The Late Late Show)

== See also ==
- 2019 in Ireland
