= 2018 in Irish television =

The following is a list of events relating to television in Ireland from 2018.

== Events ==
=== January ===
- 8 January – Micko airs on RTÉ One.
- 23 January – Saorview announces the launch of Free TV, a channel designed to promote the launch of its premium service Saorview Connect.

=== February ===
- 1 February – Joanne Cantwell is named as the new presenter of The Sunday Game following popular studio host Michael Lyster's retirement from RTÉ at the end of the 2018 GAA season.
- 3 February – Ireland's Got Talent makes its debut on TV3.

=== March ===
- 24 March – RDC win the first series of Ireland's Got Talent.
- 26 March – Jake Carter and dance partner Karen Byrne win the second series of Dancing with the Stars.

=== April ===
- 28 April – Reports emerge that RTÉ has asked the Minister for Communications, Climate Action and Environment for permission to reduce the Aertel teletext service on the grounds that it has been superseded by more recent technology. For legal reasons, RTE has to get permission from the Minister to make significant changes to Aertel.

=== May ===
- 7 May – RTÉ announce plans for a timeshift channel for RTÉ2.

=== June ===
- 6 June – Ireland's Got Talent will make its UK television debut on 5Star.

=== July ===
- 1 July – ITV closes UTV's Havelock House studios and UTV begins broadcasting from a new broadcast centre at City Quays 2 in the Belfast Harbour Estate.

=== August ===
- 30 August – TV3 is rebranded as Virgin Media One, while its sister channels 3e and be3 become Virgin Media Two and Three respectively. A fourth pay TV sports channel, Virgin Media Sport, launches on the Virgin Media platform.

=== September ===
- 1 September – To coincide with the rebranding of TV3 to Virgin Media One, the Saturday AM and Sunday AM breakfast programmes are renamed as "Weekend AM".
- 18 September – Launch of Virgin Media Sport.
- 28 September – Players of the Faithful airs on RTÉ One.

=== October ===
- 12 October – The Late Late Show is broadcast live from Central Hall Westminster in London, the first time the programme has broadcast from the United Kingdom since 1980.
- 30 October – Jennifer Zamparelli is announced as the new co-host of the Irish version of Dancing with the Stars alongside Nicky Byrne.

=== November ===
- 3 November – RTÉ2 celebrates its 40th anniversary and begins to offer vintage clips of shows from RTÉ2 on the RTÉ archives website.
- 29 November – BBC Two Northern Ireland starts broadcasting in HD.
- 30 November – The Late Late Toy Show is livestreamed on RTÉ Player, where anyone anywhere in the world can watch live as it is not Geo-blocked. It is also broadcast on RTÉ One, and goes on to become the most watched programmes on Irish television in 2018.

=== December ===
- 15 December – Rugby union player Johnny Sexton is named the 2018 RTÉ Sports Person of the Year.
- 16 December – The Coney family from County Tyrone, coached by Anna Geary, win season six of Ireland's Fittest Family, making Geary the first coach to win twice.
- 31 December – Norma Sheahan and her family win the 2018 Christmas celebrity special of Ireland's Fittest Family, and €10,000 for their charity of choice.

== Debuts ==
- 3 February – Ireland's Got Talent on TV3
- 8 February – The Young Offenders on RTÉ2
- 27 August – Killing Eve on RTÉ2
- 10 October – Finding Joy on RTÉ1
- 26 November – Death and Nightingales on RTÉ1

== Ongoing television programmes ==
=== 1960s ===
- RTÉ News: Nine O'Clock (1961–present)
- RTÉ News: Six One (1962–present)
- The Late Late Show (1962–present)

=== 1970s ===
- The Late Late Toy Show (1975–present)
- The Sunday Game (1979–present)

=== 1980s ===
- Fair City (1989–present)
- RTÉ News: One O'Clock (1989–present)

=== 1990s ===
- Would You Believe (1990s–present)
- Winning Streak (1990–present)
- Prime Time (1992–present)
- Nuacht RTÉ (1995–present)
- Nuacht TG4 (1996–present)
- Ros na Rún (1996–present)
- TV3 News (1998–present)
- Ireland AM (1999–present)
- Telly Bingo (1999–present)

=== 2000s ===
- Nationwide (2000–present)
- TV3 News at 5.30 (2001–present) – now known as the 5.30
- Against the Head (2003–present)
- news2day (2003–present)
- Other Voices (2003–present)
- Saturday Night with Miriam (2005–present)
- The Week in Politics (2006–present)
- Xposé (2007–2019)
- At Your Service (2008–present)
- Operation Transformation (2008–present)
- 3e News (2009–present)
- Dragons' Den (2009–present)
- Two Tube (2009–present)

=== 2010s ===
- Jack Taylor (2010–present)
- Mrs. Brown's Boys (2011–present)
- MasterChef Ireland (2011–present)
- Irish Pictorial Weekly (2012–present)
- Today (2012–present)
- The Works (2012–present)
- Deception (2013–present)
- Celebrity MasterChef Ireland (2013–present)
- Second Captains Live (2013–present)
- Claire Byrne Live (2015–present)
- The Restaurant (2015–present)
- Red Rock (2015–present)
- TV3 News at 8 (2015–present)
- Ploughing Live (2015–present)
- First Dates (2016–present)
- Dancing with the Stars (2017–present)
- The Tommy Tiernan Show (2017–present)
- Striking Out (2017–present)

== See also ==
- 2018 in Ireland
