= Donna and Joseph McCaul =

Irish pop duo and Eurovision contestants

Donna and Joe McCaul
- Born: 30 May 1984 (age 42) (Donna); 26 January 1988 (age 38) (Joe)
- Origin: Athlone, County Westmeath, Ireland
- Genre: Euro-pop
- Years active: 2005–present
- Members: Donna McCaul (vocals, dance), Joseph McCaul (vocals, dance)

Donna and Joseph McCaul (born 30 May 1984 and 26 January 1988, respectively), also known as The McCauls, are a brother and sister musical duo who represented Ireland in the Eurovision Song Contest 2005 in Ukraine. They were not pre-qualified for the final, due to Ireland's result from the 2004 contest, which meant they took part in the semi-final on 19 May 2005.

The decision for Donna and Joe to represent Ireland was voted on by an Irish television audience and was announced on RTÉ's You're a Star on 6 March 2005. They sang "Amazing Grace" at an audition in Waterford to earn their place in the live national finals.

They were the first ever Irish act to take part in a Eurovision Song Contest semi-final. They went no further. They returned to Ireland and appeared as guests on The Podge and Rodge Show the following year.

Following their brief spell in the spotlight, they were contestants on the RTÉ reality series Fáilte Towers in 2008, and guest-presented an episode of The Podge and Rodge Show. Donna gained some further publicity when she declared she was a lesbian. She appeared in an RTÉ Christmas special with Katherine Lynch in 2008 and featured in an episode of Anonymous during which Bazil Ashmawy fooled her on television. Joe presents a Saturday show on Athlone Community Radio. Joe reached bootcamp in series 9 of The X Factor.

== Early lives ==
Donna and Joe McCaul were born in Athlone, County Westmeath. They were raised in a family of six children. Their parents are separated and their father, Gerry, left the family when Donna and Joe were very young. Donna experienced illnesses from a young age, and had her first panic attack when she was seven. She felt claustrophobia at school. She started her career by touring in a band with Doc Carroll. Her favourite song is "From This Moment On" by Shania Twain. She sang at Our Lady's Bower Secondary in Athlone, and at the age of eighteen, was victorious in a competition called Teen Popstars. She recorded an album of cover versions at Rosemount Studios in Moate and released it locally.

== Career ==
=== You're a Star ===
They took part in the live You're a Star finals after advancing from the Waterford auditions, where they had sung "Amazing Grace". Donna had auditioned for the show in Longford the year before. They reached the final where they beat County Wexford-based group Jade, which took second place in the final after a national telephone vote. The siblings were aged 13 and 16 at the time.

=== Eurovision Song Contest ===
Their aim in the Eurovision Song Contest was to finish in the top ten at the semi-final stage, and thus qualify for the final on 21 May 2005. They had travelled in Europe to promote their song on television, taking in destinations such as Croatia and Bosnia and Herzegovina. Despite being unknown, Donna and Joe and the Irish audience were hoping that their lively song would appeal to voters across the Europe. However, they failed to get past the semi-final round. One media report beforehand had predicted, "Everybody knows that the McCauls don't stand a chance, yet we're sending them over to the event in Kyiv like lambs to the slaughter". Despite this, the BBC website greeted the news with the headline "Ireland in shock Eurovision exit". Louis Walsh said Ireland had failed because it had sent "two amateurs". Former Eurovision winner Linda Martin said they were "childish and inexperienced" without any "star quality". Marty Whelan said, "They worked their little socks off all week" and the Irish Independent said, "They sang and moved with a confidence beyond their years and wiggled their asses with some elan". They were so far Ireland's youngest act in Eurovision as they were 16 and 21 at that time.

=== Post Eurovision ===
Donna and Joe was their stage name on the Eurovision Song Contest – Kyiv 2005 two-disc album. Recently the duo have been billed as simply The McCauls, although they have since begun to pursue separate careers.

On 20 February 2006, the McCauls appeared on The Podge and Rodge Show to perform their latest single. The hosts (noted for their sharp wit and cut-throat interview techniques) focused however on ridiculing the pair instead of promoting them. This saw Podge and Rodge cut to a commercial whilst Donna and Joseph sang their new song and return from the break when the song was finished. The episode was heavily criticised and later, co-host Lucy Kennedy insisted they show a recorded version of the performance, only to find Rodge had recorded lesbian kissing scenes over the tape.

Donna and Joe appeared on Fáilte Towers in August 2008.

On 2 August 2008, Donna and Joe appeared as a couple on the Irish reality television show Fáilte Towers broadcast on RTÉ One. The show involved celebrity members taking on different jobs each day as part of the staff of a large country hotel in Ireland. While there they encountered, among other people, fellow Eurovision entertainer, Dickie Rock, as well as a fake wedding, a nudist group and a set of Japanese tourists before "checking out" after being chosen to leave over Big Brother winner Brian Dowling and former Liberty X singer Michelle Heaton. Whilst in the hotel the pair managed to raise over €30,000 for their chosen charity Aware, an Irish voluntary organisation providing support to through depression. Media coverage of the pair's time in Fáilte Towers was scathing, with one report saying: "By definition, this type of reality TV is nothing more than a springboard for wannabe celebs who have somehow scraped onto the bottom of the fame ladder". Don Baker, a fellow contestant on the show, asked Donna to perform a concert with him at the Helix on 18 September 2008.

On 17 November 2008, both Donna and Joe were invited to guest present The Podge and Rodge Show. During the show Donna took over from Lucy Kennedy's spot, whilst Joe was soaked with purple gunge whilst singing the Prince classic "Purple Rain".

On 26 December 2008, Donna was invited to appear on an RTÉ Christmas special, a comedy skit show in which Katherine Lynch starred as Singing Bernie Walsh, a character from her RTÉ show Katherine Lynch's Wonderwomen.

Donna was recently caught out by Jason Byrne on the Irish television show Anonymous, when Bazil Ashmawy disguised himself as a shy man in his early thirties who was lacking in confidence and needed Donna's help to overcome this problem. The show was aired on RTÉ Two sometime in spring 2009.

Donna and Joe sang their Eurovision entry at the wedding of TV presenter Alan Hughes and Karl Broderick (who wrote the song) at the Mansion House, Dublin on 30 September 2011.

Joe studies journalism and media. Donna was one of the backing singers for J. Anvil at the Maltese pre-selection for the Eurovision Song Contest 2011. Her debut solo single was due for release in November 2011.

On 24 February 2012, Donna entered the Irish Eurovision national final with her song "Mercy". She finished in third place.

On 2 February 2015, it was revealed that Donna had made it to the blind auditions of The Voice USA 2015. In September 2015, Joe auditioned for the twelfth series of The X Factor and made it past the arena auditions to bootcamp. However, he was eliminated at six chair challenge stage.

Awards and achievements
| Preceded by Chris Doran with "If My World Stopped Turning" | Ireland in the Eurovision Song Contest; 2005 | Succeeded by Brian Kennedy with "Every Song Is a Cry for Love" |
| Preceded by Chris Doran | Winner of You're a Star; 2005 | Succeeded by Lucia Evans |
