= Ireland in the Eurovision Song Contest 2005 =

- Eurovision Song Contest 2005
- Participating broadcaster: Radio Telefís Éireann (RTÉ)
- Country: Ireland
- Selection process: You're a Star
- Selection date: 6 March 2005

Competing entry
- Song: "Love?"
- Artist: Donna and Joe
- Songwriters: Karl Broderick

Placement
- Semi-final result: Failed to qualify (14th)

Participation chronology

Ireland was represented at the Eurovision Song Contest 2005 with the song "Love?", written by Karl Broderick, and performed by Donna and Joe. The Irish participating broadcaster, Radio Telefís Éireann (RTÉ), organised the competition You're a Star in order to select its entry for the contest. The competition consisted of 17 shows and concluded with a final, resulting in the selection of "Love?" performed by Donna and Joe as the Irish Eurovision entry after facing a public televote.

Ireland competed in the semi-final of the Eurovision Song Contest which took place on 19 May 2005. Performing during the show in position 22, "Love?" was not announced among the top 10 entries of the semi-final and therefore did not qualify to compete in the final. It was later revealed that Ireland placed fourteenth out of the 25 participating countries in the semi-final with 53 points.

== Background ==
Prior to the 2005 contest, Radio Éireann (RÉ) until 1966, and Radio Telefís Éireann (RTÉ) since 1967, had participated in the Eurovision Song Contest representing Ireland thirty-eight times since RÉ's first entry in 1965. They have won the contest a record seven times in total. Their first win came in 1970, with "All Kinds of Everything" performed by Dana. Ireland holds the record for being the only country to win the contest three times in a row (in 1992, 1993, and 1994), as well as having the only three-time winner (Johnny Logan, who won in 1980 as a singer, 1987 as a singer-songwriter, and again in 1992 as a songwriter). In 2004, "If My World Stopped Turning" performed by Chris Doran placed twenty-second.

As part of its duties as participating broadcaster, RTÉ organises the selection of its entry in the Eurovision Song Contest and broadcasts the event in the country. The broadcaster confirmed its intentions to participate at the 2005 contest on 29 May 2004. RTÉ has consistently used a national final procedure to choose its entry, with several artists and songs being featured. Since 2003, RTÉ had set up the talent contest You're a Star to choose both the song and performer to compete at Eurovision. For the 2005 contest, alongside its confirmation, the broadcaster announced that both the song and performer would be selected via You're a Star.

== Before Eurovision ==
=== You're a Star ===
RTÉ selected its entry for the Eurovision Song Contest 2004 through the third season of the music competition series You're a Star, which was developed by RTÉ and co-produced with Screentime ShinAwil. The shows took place in the Mahoney Hall of the Helix in the Dublin City University (DCU), hosted by Ray D'Arcy and featured a judging panel composed of RTÉ 2fm presenter Dave Fanning, IMRO Deputy Chairperson Barbara Galavan and singer-songwriter Hazel Kaneswaran. The competition consisted of 17 shows, which commenced on 11 September 2004 and concluded on 6 March 2005. All shows in the competition were broadcast on RTÉ One.

The competition took place over two phases. The first phase involved candidates attending auditions held across Ireland in Limerick, Waterford, Sligo, Dublin, and Portlaoise (bands only) between 11 September 2004 and 16 October 2004. The first three shows showcased the auditions and the judging panel selected 36 candidates to take part in a week-long workshop where they were supported by a team of choreographers, stylists and vocal coaches. The fourth to sixth shows covered the workshop with ten contestants being selected by the judges to go forward to the next stage in the competition. The seventh show introduced eight wildcards selected by the judges from the eliminated acts with two being selected to also go through to the next stage following a public televote. The second phase was the ten live shows where the results of all shows were determined solely by a public televote; the judging panel participated in an advisory role only. Following the ninth show, the three contestants remaining in the competition were matched with a potential Eurovision Song Contest song selected by a jury panel with members appointed by RTÉ from 255 entries received through a public submission. The three finalist songs were announced on 2 March 2005. The public televote that took place in both phases was conducted through telephone and SMS.

Competing songs
Song	Songwriter(s)
"Love?"	Karl Broderick
"Pink Champagne"	Ray Traynor
"Will I Be Dreaming"	Fran King, Larry Hogan

==== Results summary ====
Colour key
– Contestant received the most public votes
– Contestant received the fewest public votes and was eliminated

Contestant	Show 1	Show 2	Show 3	Show 4	Show 5	Show 6	Show 7	Show 8	Show 9	Show 10 (Final)
Donna and Joseph McCaul	2nd	—N/a	7th	4th	2nd	1st	2nd	1st	1st	1st
Jade	3rd	—N/a	6th	3rd	4th	4th	4th	2nd	2nd	2nd
The Henry Girls	—N/a	4th	1st	2nd	5th	5th	1st	3rd	3rd	Eliminated (Show 9)
Peter Fagan	—N/a	3rd	2nd	1st	1st	3rd	3rd	4th	Eliminated (Show 8)	
Aine O'Doherty	—N/a	2nd	3rd	5th	6th	2nd	5th	Eliminated (Show 7)		
Lorraine Maher	—N/a	1st	5th	6th	3rd	6th	Eliminated (Show 6)			
Ann Harrington	5th	—N/a	8th	7th	7th	Eliminated (Show 5)				
Sinéad Mulvey	—N/a	5th	4th	8th	Eliminated (Show 4)					
David Hope	1st	—N/a	9th/10th	Eliminated (Show 3)						
George	4th	—N/a	9th/10th	Eliminated (Show 3)						
Fran King	—N/a	6th	Eliminated (Show 2)							
Sinéad Hand	6th	Eliminated (Show 1)								

==== Live shows ====
The ten live shows took place between 9 January and 6 March 2005. The first eight shows featured various themes: free choice for the first three shows, well known recent hits for the fourth shows, summer songs for the fifth show, Motown love songs for the sixth show, Elvis Presley songs for the seventh show, and movie soundtracks and Eurovision songs for the eighth show. Either one or two contestants were eliminated in each of the eight shows. The three remaining contestants each performed their candidate Eurovision songs during the ninth show and one contestant was eliminated. In the final show, "Love?" performed by Donna and Joseph McCaul was selected as the winner.

Show 1 – 9 January 2005
R/O	Artist	Song (Original artists)	Place	Result
1	Jade	"Beautiful Thing"	3	Advanced
2	Donna and Joseph McCaul	"So Strong"	2	Advanced
3	George	"Lady Marmalade" (Labelle)	4	Advanced
4	Sinéad Hand	"You're So Vain" (Carly Simon)	6	—N/a
5	David Hope	"You Can Call Me Al" (Paul Simon)	1	Advanced
6	Ann Harrington	"Can't Take My Eyes Off You" (Frankie Valli)	5	Advanced

Show 2 – 16 January 2005
R/O	Artist	Song (Original artists)	Place	Result
1	The Henry Girls	"I'm Like a Bird" (Nelly Furtado)	4	Advanced
2	Sinéad Mulvey	"I Love Rock 'n' Roll" (The Arrows)	5	Advanced
3	Fran King	"Heart of Glass" (Blondie)	6	—N/a
4	Aine O'Doherty	"Big Yellow Taxi" (Joni Mitchell)	2	Advanced
5	Peter Fagan	"She's Always a Woman" (Billy Joel)	3	Advanced
6	Lorraine Maher	"Good Riddance" (Green Day)	1	Advanced

Show 3 – 23 January 2005
R/O	Artist	Song (Original artists)	Place	Result
1	Jade	"Dragon"	6	Advanced
2	Donna and Joseph McCaul	"It Takes Two" (Marvin Gaye and Kim Weston)	7	Advanced
3	Lorraine Maher	"All Me"	5	Advanced
4	David Hope	"On That Train"	9-10	—N/a
5	George	"You Might Need Somebody" (Turley Richards)	9-10	—N/a
6	Ann Harrington	"Everytime" (Britney Spears)	8	Advanced
7	Aine O'Doherty	"Piece of My Heart" (Erma Franklin)	3	Advanced
8	The Henry Girls	"Long Time Gone" (The Everly Brothers)	1	Advanced
9	Peter Fagan	"Walking in Memphis" (Marc Cohn)	2	Advanced
10	Sinéad Mulvey	"Don't Speak" (No Doubt)	4	Advanced

Show 4 – 30 January 2005
R/O	Artist	Song (Original artists)	Place	Result
1	Sinéad Mulvey	"Seven Nation Army" (The White Stripes)	8	—N/a
2	Donna and Joseph McCaul	"I'll Stand by You" (The Pretenders)	4	Advanced
3	Peter Fagan	"Take Your Mama" (Scissor Sisters)	1	Advanced
4	Jade	"Obviously" (McFly)	3	Advanced
5	Lorraine Maher	"Cannonball" (Damien Rice)	6	Advanced
6	Ann Harrington	"Left Outside Alone" (Anastacia)	7	Advanced
7	The Henry Girls	"Vertigo" (U2)	2	Advanced
8	Aine O'Doherty	"Mr. Brightside" (The Killers)	5	Advanced

Show 5 – 6 February 2005
R/O	Artist	Song (Original artists)	Place	Result
1	The Henry Girls	"Soak Up the Sun" (Sheryl Crow)	5	Advanced
2	Peter Fagan	"Lovely Day" (Bill Withers)	1	Advanced
3	Aine O'Doherty	"Heyday"	6	Advanced
4	Lorraine Maher	"July"	3	Advanced
5	Jade	"Surfin' U.S.A." (The Beach Boys)	4	Advanced
6	Donna and Joseph McCaul	"My Girl" (The Temptations)	2	Advanced
7	Ann Harrington	"Holiday" (Madonna)	7	—N/a

Show 6 – 13 February 2005
R/O	Artist	Song (Original artists)	Place	Result
1	The Henry Girls	"Stop! In the Name of Love" (The Supremes)	5	Advanced
2	Lorraine Maher	"What Becomes of the Brokenhearted" (Jimmy Ruffin)	6	—N/a
3	Aine O'Doherty	"I Heard It Through the Grapevine" (Marvin Gaye)	2	Advanced
4	Jade	"Ain't No Sunshine" (Bill Withers)	4	Advanced
5	Donna and Joseph McCaul	"End of the Road" (Boyz II Men)	1	Advanced
6	Peter Fagan	"Let's Stay Together" (Al Green)	3	Advanced

Show 7 (Elvis Presley songs) – 20 February 2005
R/O	Artist	Song	Place	Result
1	Donna and Joseph McCaul	"Blue Suede Shoes"/"Jailhouse Rock"	2	Advanced
2	The Henry Girls	"That's All Right"	1	Advanced
3	Aine O'Doherty	"Always on My Mind"	5	—N/a
4	Jade	"Suspicious Minds"	4	Advanced
5	Peter Fagan	"Burning Love"	3	Advanced

Show 8 – 27 February 2005
R/O	Artist	Song (Original artists)	R/O	Song (Original artists)	Place	Result
1	The Henry Girls	"Down in the River to Pray"	5	"A Little Peace" (Nicole)	3	Advanced
2	Peter Fagan	"Livin' on a Prayer" (Bon Jovi)	6	"Somewhere in Europe" (Liam Reilly)	4	—N/a
3	Jade	"Just Like Jesse James" (Cher)	7	"Hold Me Now" (Johnny Logan)	2	Advanced
4	Donna and Joseph McCaul	"(I've Had) The Time of My Life" (Bill Medley and Jennifer Warnes)	8	"Rock 'n' Roll Kids" (Paul Harrington and Charlie McGettigan)	1	Advanced

Show 9 – 5 March 2005
R/O	Artist	Song	Place	Result
1	The Henry Girls	"Will I Be Dreaming"	3	—N/a
2	Donna and Joseph McCaul	"Love?"	1	Advanced
3	Jade	"Pink Champagne"	2	Advanced

Final – 6 March 2005
R/O	Artist	Song	Place
1	Donna and Joseph McCaul	"Love?"	1
2	Jade	"Pink Champagne"	2

==== Ratings ====
Viewing figures by show
Show	Air date	Viewers	Ref.
Final	6 March 2005	916,000	

== At Eurovision ==
The Eurovision Song Contest 2005 took place at the Palace of Sports in Kyiv, Ukraine and consisted of one semi-final on 19 May, and the final on 21 May 2005. According to Eurovision rules, all nations with the exceptions of the host country, the "Big Four" (France, Germany, Spain and the United Kingdom), and the ten highest placed finishers in the 2004 contest were required to qualify from the semi-final in order to compete for the final; the top ten countries from the semi-final progressed to the final. As Ireland had placed 22nd in the previous contest, the nation had to compete in the semi-final this year. On 22 March 2005, an allocation draw was held which determined the running order for the semi-final and Ireland was set to perform in position 22, following the entry from Bulgaria and before the entry from Slovenia.

The Irish stage performance was choreographed by Daryn Crosbie and directed by Ronan Johnston, with Donna and Joe together on stage with backing vocalists/dancers Clare Ivory, Linzi Cowap, Donna Bissett and Alana Murrin. At the end of the semi-final, Ireland was not announced among the top 10 entries and therefore failed to qualify to compete in the final. It was later revealed that Ireland placed 14th in the semi-final, receiving a total of 53 points.

In Ireland, the semi-final was broadcast on RTÉ Two and the final was broadcast on RTÉ One with both shows featuring commentary by Marty Whelan. RTÉ appointed Dana (who won Eurovision for Ireland in 1970) as its spokesperson to announce the results of the Irish televote during the final.

=== Voting ===
Below is a breakdown of points awarded to Ireland and awarded by Ireland in the semi-final and grand final of the contest. The nation awarded its 12 points to the Denmark in the semi-final and to Latvia in the final of the contest.

==== Points awarded to Ireland ====
Points awarded to Ireland (Semi-final)
Score	Country
12 points	United Kingdom
10 points	Hungary
8 points	
7 points	
6 points	
5 points	Croatia; Malta; Romania
4 points	Bosnia and Herzegovina; Turkey
3 points	
2 points	Andorra; Estonia; Poland
1 point	Bulgaria; Cyprus

==== Points awarded by Ireland ====
Points awarded by Ireland (Semi-final)
Score	Country
12 points	Denmark
10 points	Norway
8 points	Romania
7 points	Israel
6 points	Latvia
5 points	Lithuania
4 points	Netherlands
3 points	Moldova
2 points	Switzerland
1 point	Estonia

Points awarded by Ireland (Final)
Score	Country
12 points	Latvia
10 points	Malta
8 points	United Kingdom
7 points	Denmark
6 points	Israel
5 points	Romania
4 points	Norway
3 points	Switzerland
2 points	Greece
1 point	Bosnia and Herzegovina
