= 2026 in Irish television =

The following is a list of events relating to television in Ireland from 2026.

== Events ==
=== January ===
- 1 January – RTÉ One's New Year's Eve celebrations included a special edition of The Late Late Show from 10.25pm presented by Patrick Kielty, with performances from David Gray, Lyra, Garron Noone and Sharon Shannon, and a live countdown from Dublin Castle with a performance from Inhaler. Irish athlete Kate O'Connor, Olympic rower Fintan McCarthy, architect Dermot Bannon and cast members from The Traitors Ireland also appeared on the show.
- 5 January – Virgin Media One airs the Coronation Street/Emmerdale crossover episode Corriedale ahead of the launch of a new "Soap Power Hour" that will see Emmerdale airing at 8pm and Coronation Street at 8.30pm on weeknights.
- 6 January – Virgin Media One begins showing the sitcom Friends at 7.30pm on weeknights.
- 24 January – RTÉ and Virgin Media Television reveal their schedules for coverage of the 2026 Six Nations Championship.

=== February ===
- 4 February – Guinness and Virgin Media Television announce they are collaborating for a second year to provide audio description and sign language for viewers of the Six Nations Championship.
- 19 February – Former Coronation Street actress Beverley Callard makes her debut in Irish soap Fair City.
- 20 February – The 22nd Irish Film & Television Awards take place at the Dublin Royal Convention Centre.

=== March ===
- 15 March – Katelyn Cummins and professional dancer Leonardo Lini win series 9 of Dancing with the Stars.

=== July ===
- 7 July – RTÉ confirms that Patrick Kielty will return as presenter of The Late Late Show in September, following speculation he would not do so.

=== August ===
- 18 August – The Westmeath Rose, Caoilfhinn Ní Choiligh, wins the 2026 Rose of Tralee, which was shown on RTÉ 1 over two nights.

=== September ===
- 17 September – RTÉ confirms it will not return to the 2027 Eurovision Song Contest, due to Israel's participation, the second occasion on which it has withdrawn from the contest.

== Debuts ==
- 1 February – These Sacred Vows on RTÉ 1.
- 8 November - The Galway Bay Murders on RTÉ 1.

== Ongoing television programmes ==
=== 1960s ===
- RTÉ News: Nine O'Clock (1961–present)
- RTÉ News: Six One (1962–present)
- The Late Late Show (1962–present)

=== 1970s ===
- The Late Late Toy Show (1975–present)
- The Sunday Game (1979–present)

=== 1980s ===
- Fair City (1989–present)
- RTÉ News: One O'Clock (1989–present)

=== 1990s ===
- Would You Believe (1990s–present)
- Winning Streak (1990–present)
- Prime Time (1992–present)
- Nuacht RTÉ (1995–present)
- Nuacht TG4 (1996–present)
- Reeling In the Years (1999–present)
- Ros na Rún (1996–present)
- Virgin Media News (1998–present)
- Ireland AM (1999–present)
- Telly Bingo (1999–present)

=== 2000s ===
- Nationwide (2000–present)
- Virgin Media News (2001–present) – now known as the 5.30
- Against the Head (2003–present)
- news2day (2003–present)
- Other Voices (2003–present)
- The Week in Politics (2006–present)
- At Your Service (2008–present)
- Two Tube (2009–present)

=== 2010s ===
- Room to Improve (2007–present)
- Jack Taylor (2010–present)
- Mrs. Brown's Boys (2011–present)
- MasterChef Ireland (2011–present)
- Today (2012–present)
- The Works (2012–present)
- Second Captains Live (2013–present)
- Ireland's Fittest Family (2014–present)
- The Restaurant (2015–present)
- Red Rock (2015–present)
- First Dates (2016–present)
- Dancing with the Stars (2017–2020, 2022–present)
- The Tommy Tiernan Show (2017–present)

=== 2020s ===
- The Style Counsellors (2020–present)
- The 2 Johnnies' Late Night Lock In (2023–present)

== Deaths ==
- 20 March – Ben Keaton, 69, Irish actor (Emmerdale, Casualty, Father Ted).
- 22 March – Michael Lyster, 71, sports broadcaster (The Sunday Game). (death announced on this date)
- 3 May – Gary Lydon, 61, actor (The Banshees of Inisherin, The Clinic, War Horse). (death announced on this date)
