= Anonymous (TV series) =

- Created by: Kite Entertainment; Animo Television
- Starring: Jason Byrne
- Country of origin: Ireland
- No. of episodes: 30

Production
- Running time: 26 minutes

Original release
- Network: RTÉ Two
- Release: 2006 – 11 April 2011

Anonymous is an Irish television series broadcast on RTÉ Two. Its concept was to disguise well-known personalities, with the use of prosthetic masks, bestow upon them a fake identity, and set them up in what were intended to be humorous situations for the sake of entertainment.

== Format and history ==
Anonymous was presented by Jason Byrne, who also used a hidden microphone to communicate mischievous ideas via whispering to the disguised personality. It ran for five series, with the last series broadcast in 2009. Byrne was offered funding for a further season, but turned it down, stating that it was too hard to find people who didn't know of the show and therefore saw through the ruses (its sister program, Naked Camera, did not help matters). He wanted the show to be remembered as being good while it lasted, and not being cancelled when it became desperate. Byrne was the celebrity who went anonymous in the final episode (Hector O hEochagain, the second ever guest behind Samantha Mumba, presented the show).

== Participants ==
The series is known for showing the then Progressive Unionist Party leader David Ervine in a humorous light in an episode filmed before his death in January 2007. Ervine was one of three political representatives from Northern Ireland who agreed to partake in the programme; the others were Paul Maskey of Sinn Féin and John Dallat of the SDLP.

They were interviewed by Belfast comedian Patrick Kielty, who was in the guise of New York TV reporter, "Betty Silverman". Ervine's family consented for the episode to be broadcast in the aftermath of his death.

In the opening episode of the third series, Westlife member Nicky Byrne, was dressed up as Mick Byrne, "an evangelistic Garda from Kiltimagh on a mission to clean up the mean streets of Swords." For the role he had to put on a Longford accent and, as Garda Byrne, he took the names of foreign nationals, asking them for their licence to be in Ireland; asked locals for cigarettes, and chastised people for walking too fast and speaking too loudly in the betting shop. He then drove around the local shopping centre in a motorised trolley making his own siren sound and asking people where they were going. He called to his own parents' house to ask for Westlife autographs and tickets for Croke Park and makes a fool of his friends, former Leeds United footballer Gary Kelly and rugby international Brian O'Driscoll.

Also featuring in the series were model Glenda Gilson as a tree-hugging eco-warrior, and TV presenter Craig Doyle as Argentine sports reporter "Rodrigo Depassa".

== International versions ==
Anonymous has several different versions around the world, with the format being produced in countries including;

Germany, Romania, Spain (La Sexta), UK (ITV) (with Stephen Mulhern),

British channel ITV started broadcasting its own hour-long version of the show on Saturday 18 July 2009, allotting it a prime time spot at 6.30pm.

In ITV's first episode, X Factor judge Louis Walsh, actress and comedian Jennie McAlpine, Richard Arnold (TV presenter), former English rugby union player Austin Healey, actress Michelle Keegan, (singer Shayne Ward and former English rugby captain Matt Dawson went 'Anonymous'.

== Episodes ==
This is an incomplete and comprehensive list of episodes of Anonymous.

=== Series 1 (2006) ===
#	Pretender	Character
1	Samantha Mumba	"Sister Felicitus"
2	Hector Ó hEochagáin	"Paul Tuomey"
3	Brian McFadden	
4	Keith Duffy	
5	Des Bishop	
6	Kathryn Thomas	"Thomas Kay"

=== Series 2 (2007) ===
#	Pretender	Character
1	Ronan Keating	"Mick the Cabbie"
2	Ken Doherty	"Father Sean"
3	Patrick Kielty	"Betty Silverman"
4	Pamela Flood	"Doreen Prendergast"
5	Keith Barry	"Kavi Shergill"
6	Lucy Kennedy	"John Fitzgerald"

=== Series 3 (2008) ===
The third series featured Nicky Byrne, Glenda Gilson and Craig Doyle amongst others.

=== Series 4 (2009) ===
#	Pretender	Character	Date of broadcast
1	Amanda Byram	"Nanna"	2 March 2009
2	Jason McAteer	"Peter Campbell"	9 March 2009
3	Baz Ashmawy	"Karl DeButler"	16 March 2009
4	Aidan Power	Happy Harrison	23 March 2009
5	Brendan O'Carroll		30 March 2009
6	Jason Byrne	Jim Keegan	6 April 2009

=== Series 5 (2011) ===
#	Pretender/s	Character/s	Date of broadcast
1	Amanda Brunker	"Nuala Ni Buachailli "	7 March 2011
2	Grainne Seoige	"Gillian Cullen"	14 March 2011
3	Jedward	"Seanie and Edwina"	21 March 2011
4	Rosanna Davison		28 March 2011
5	Michelle Heaton	Brian Spencer Moore	4 April 2011
6	Jason Byrne	Sister Sinead Murphy	11 April 2011
