= Caitlín Nic Aoidh =

Irish television personality

- Education: Maynooth University
- Years active: 2014-
- Television: TG4

Caitlín Nic Aoidh (born on the 24th of April, year undisclosed, in Cloughaneely, County Donegal, Ireland) is a television presenter for TG4. She is a native Irish speaker from Cloughaneely, County Donegal.

== Education ==
Caitlín Nic Aoidh attended secondary school at Pobalscoil Chloich Cheannfhaola in Falcarragh. She later studied at Maynooth University, where she received her undergraduate degree in Irish and Music and her master's degree in Irish. She was also awarded a Professional Diploma in Education at NUI Galway.

== Career ==
Following her study in Maynooth, Caitlín moved to Galway, where she taught Irish and Music at secondary school level. She joined TG4 as a weather forecaster and television presenter in 2014.

On Halloween in 2016, viewers were shocked when Caitlín suddenly disappeared after a bolt of lightning flashed on screen. It was later revealed that it was in fact a trick that had become popular at the time, as part of a response to the TV show Have I Got a Bit More News for You.

She was a guest on The Tommy Tiernan Show in 2018.

She was nominated for 'Best TV Presenter' at the 2016 STELLAR Shine Awards.
