= A Shine of Rainbows =

- Canadian poster
- Directed by: Vic Sarin
- Written by: Vic Sarin; Catherine Spear; Dennis Foon
- Produced by: Tina Pehme; Kim Roberts; James Flynn
- Starring: Connie Nielsen; Aidan Quinn; John Bell; Jack Gleeson; Tara Alice Scully; Niamh Shaw
- Cinematography: Vic Sarin
- Edited by: Alison Grace
- Music by: Keith Power
- Distributed by: Sepia Films; Freestyle Releasing
- Release dates: October 2009 (London Film Festival); April 9, 2010 (Canada)
- Running time: 101 minutes
- Countries: Ireland; Canada
- Language: English

A Shine of Rainbows, also known as Tomás and the Rainbows, is a 2009 Irish-Canadian family drama film, directed and co-written by Vic Sarin as an adaptation of the novel A Shine of Rainbows by Lillian Beckwith.

== Plot ==
During the 1960s, young Irish orphan Tomás (John Bell) is harassed and ridiculed for his small size, timidity, and stuttering by the other children in his orphanage. Just after freeing a pigeon from his classroom, he is called to the headmasters' office to be greeted by Maire (Connie Nielsen). Maire has adopted him and takes him back to her island home, where Tomás meets Maire's husband, Alec (Aidan Quinn). Tomás is intimidated by Alec, who had expected Maire to adopt an older child.

Tomás makes friends with Nancy (Tara Alice Scully) and Seamus (Jack Gleeson). They take him to their 'secret' cave, which is inhabited by bats. Tomás is frightened by the bats and flees from the cave, after which Nancy and Seamus find and console him. Tomás is introduced to his new school and is generally accepted by the pupils. As Maire's influence on him begins to emerge, he grows more confident and becomes drawn to wildlife.

Soon thereafter, Alec and Tomás go fishing when Maire has to go to the mainland for some shopping. They find a young abandoned seal on the beach. Tomás decides to care for the seal, which he names 'Smudge.'

For Tomás's birthday, Maire and Alec give him a new fishing rod and reel. The next morning, Alec takes Tomás out to teach him to use the tackle, but Alec becomes distracted with helping some friends move a stuck boat. He tells Tomás to wait for him at the beach until he is finished helping his friends, but ultimately goes to a pub afterwards instead of returning to the beach. Tomás waits for Alec for nearly the entire day.

Later, Maire finds Tomás and takes him out in the boat herself. She discloses she was also an orphan and had similar experiences to Tomás, which caused her to choose to adopt him over the other children. Maire teaches Tomás to picture his grandmother in his mind and he does, remembering her for the first time many years. He learns he can recall memories by 'painting' them in his mind. They then see a rainbow and Maire promises to take Tomás into one someday. That night, Maire has an argument with Alec, telling him that he shouldn't have left Tomás waiting.

The next day, Maire becomes sick, and is seen by a doctor (Gerard Bonner). Tomás goes to stay with Katie (Niamh Shaw), Seamus and Nancy's mother. He buys Maire a colorful tablecloth and visits her at her bedside, where he is informed that Maire will likely die shortly. Alec sends a distraught Tomás home from the hospital, and later returns and informs him that Maire has died.

At Maire's funeral, Alec continues to act cold towards Tomás despite their shared sorrow. Tomás says that Alec needs him but Alec continues to be brusque with Tomás. Tomás also learns from his friends that the orphanage will soon reclaim him, as Alec never signed the adoption papers.

Alec starts to drink heavily and burns all of Maire's possessions. When Tomás finds out, he blames Alec for Maire's death and runs away to Katie's home. She explains to Tomás how sad Alec is about losing Maire. The next day, Tomás goes to feed Smudge and asks him to pass on a message to Maire, asking her 'what he should to do.' A rainbow appears, bathing Tomás and Smudge in light.

Tomás returns home to finds Alec having fallen asleep after drinking. Tomás wakes Alec, giving him a red scarf Maire had 'smiled' into for him earlier. Alec goes to bed holding the scarf and hearing Maire's laughter.

In the morning, Tomás packs up his possessions and goes out in the boat to deliver Smudge to his Maire. When Alec realizes that Tomás isn't at home, he searches for him at the beach. He finds that Tomás's boat has capsized, but Smudge and a pod of seals push him to the shore. Alec is relieved to find that Tomás is still alive.

Back home, Alec asks if Tomás wants to go back to the orphanage. Tomás refuses, and states that he wants to stay with Alec. Alec finally signs the adoption papers, and Tomás calls him 'Dad.'

== Cast ==
- Connie Nielsen as Maire O'Donnell
- Aidan Quinn as Alec O'Donnell
- John Bell as Tomás
- Jack Gleeson as Seamus
- Tara Alice Scully as Nancy
- Niamh Shaw as Katie
- Laura Doherty as Nurse
- Ian McElhinney as Father Doyle
- Shaun McCreanor as Extra from School
- Megan McCreanor as Extra from school
- Shaun McLaughlin as Extra from school

== Production ==
The film was primarily shot in County Donegal, Ireland. Some of the orphanage scenes were shot in an abandoned hospital 'touched-up' by the design crew. Over 500 locals/extras were seen for casting, over three days, including many children. 'Smudge' was an animatronic, and its scenes were shot first, due to concerns about bad weather on the beach, which never occurred. In fact, for the 'rain scene' (jumping in puddles), they had to produce it, as it failed to rain during production.

Music by The Henry Girls was featured in the film.

Nielsen and Quinn had previously co-starred together in Return to Sender (2004).

== Accolades ==
Award	Category	Result
Chicago International Children's Film Festival - Children's Jury Award	Live-Action Feature Film or Video - English Language - Vic Sarin	Won
Genie Award	Adapted Screenplay - Vic Sarin, Catherine Spear and Dennis Foon	Nominated
Heartland Film Festival - Audience Award	Best Dramatic Feature - Vic Sarin	Won
Irish Film and Television Awards	Best Original Score - The Henry Girls	Nominated
