= Niamh Shaw =

Irish actress, scientist and science communicator

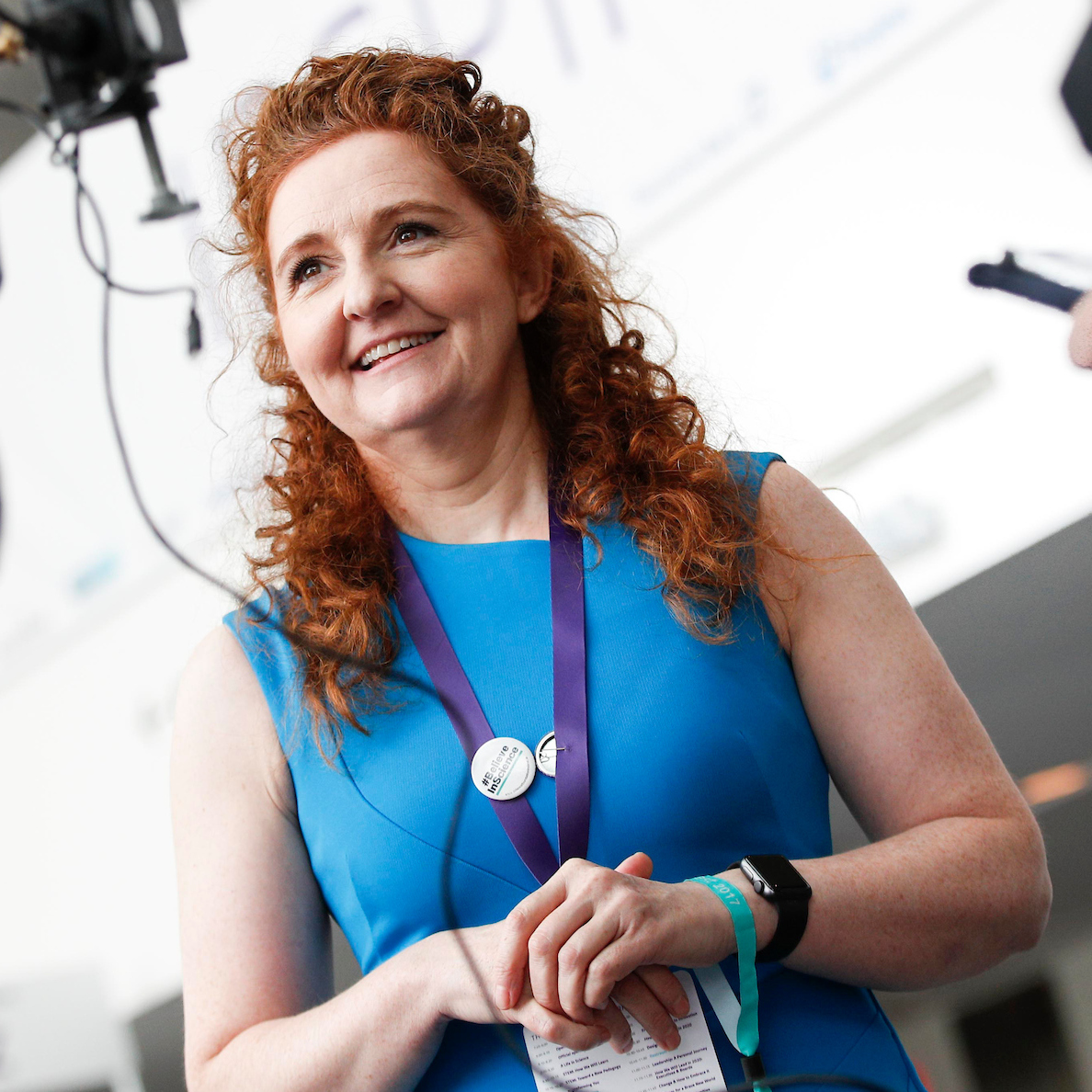
- Dr. Niamh Shaw in 2017
- Education: University College Dublin, (PhD)
- Occupations: Science Communicator, writer and performer
- Years active: 2005 — today
- Website: niamhshaw.ie

Niamh Shaw is an Irish scientist, engineer, STEM communicator, writer, and performer.

Shaw was the 2019–2020 Honorary Ambassador for the Irish Girl Guides. Her first book, Dream Big: An Irishwoman's Space Odyssey, published by Mercier Press tells the story of her 40-year quest to fulfill her childhood dream.

== Early life and education ==
Shaw graduated from University College Dublin in 1990 with a Bachelor of Engineering in Mechanical Engineering, focusing on Biosystems Engineering, a Master in Biosystems Engineering in 1995, and Ph.D. in Food Science in 2001.

From 2001–2003 Shaw was a postdoctoral researcher in the Department of Food Science and Technology at University College Dublin.

In 2015, she participated in the International Space University Space Studies Programme.

== Career ==
In 2003, Shaw began performing and acting. In 2007–2008 she appeared as Frances McGuigan in Fair City and as Mable Mills in the movie Dorothy Mills. She also appeared in Satellites & Meteorites (2008), A Shine of Rainbows (2009), Hideaways (2011), Little Brother, Big Trouble: A Christmas Adventure (2012), and You're Ugly Too (2015).

As an improvisation comedian, she has performed with The Craic Pack Comedy Improv, The Cardinals, Snatch Comedy, Cork, and The Second City, Los Angeles.

=== Science communicator ===
In 2011, Shaw created her first theatre show, "That's About the Size of It". During the show's making, she was invited by an arts initiative at CERN (Arts@CERN) to discuss her ideas about STEM and public engagement with particle physicists at the facility. The show toured from 2011 to 2013.

Other science-related shows include Baking in Space (2018–2019), Art in Mind (2016–2018), Irish Astronauts of 1991 (2018), My Place in Space (2014–2016), and Memory of Place (2015).

From 2014 to 2019, she was an artist in residence at Cork Institute of Technology BlackRock Castle Observatory.

Shaw is a co-founder of STEAMakers, a global initiative with her fellow SSP15 alumni, to create a global community and inspire the next generation to consider careers in STEM. She has presented scientific papers on the collaborative nature of her work between technology, science, and art. She is a regular speaker at STEM events to promote "Women in STEM" science outreach. In 2014, she participated in TEDxUCD (2014).

She has been contributing to the International Space University Space Studies Programme since 2016, as a lecturer in 2016, core lecture co-chair in 2017, and co-chair for the Humanities Department in 2018.

Since 2014, Shaw has set her life's mission to get to space as an artist and citizen rather than an astronaut.

In 2019, she travelled to NASA's Johnson Space Centre in Houston, Texas to speak at their annual Cross Industry Innovation Summit.

She joined the Homeward Bound (organization) for their 2023 expedition to Antarctica. In preparation for this, she developed an educational programme with the Environmental Awareness Office of Laois County Council for classrooms on climate change and the extreme environment of the Antarctic.

=== Speaker / lecturer ===
Shaw has spoken at conferences, summits, and TEDx events, including WIRED UK (Tate Modern, UK), New Scientist Live (Excel UK), and NASA Johnson Innovation Summit (Houston, Texas, USA).

On 9 March 2019, she spoke at Áras an Uachtarain, in response to President Higgin's "Women in STEM" speech at a special reception to celebrate International Women's Day.

Since completing the Space Studies Programme in 2015, she has been involved in lecturing on communications and arts content at the same programme in 2016, 2017, and 2018.

=== Performer / writer / artist ===
Shaw's theatre project, Diary of a Martian Beekeeper, premiered at Space week 2017, followed by a limited run in 2018. The show was funded under Science Foundation Ireland's 2017 Discover programme, working with ESA's Astronaut Centre to capture the massive group effort behind human space exploration.

Her second STEAM show, To Space concerned her dream to get to the International Space Station, sharing her mission with the astronaut crew on board. The show toured Europe and Australia between 2014–2016, including Edinburgh Fringe (2015), Adelaide Fringe (2016), Edinburgh International Science Festival (2016), and Cheltenham Science Festival (2016).

She has presented academic aspects of her work in STEAM at scientific conferences, including Communicating Astronomy with the Public (CAP) 2018, the International Astronautical Congress (2017, 2016), the European Geosciences Assembly (2015–2018), and European Planetary Sciences Congress (2015).

Shaw is a regular contributor to Irish radio and press on science and technology-related topics, and a regular writer for the BBC Sky at Night astronomy magazine.

Her other work in science art and technology and public engagement includes Memory of Place (Festival of Curiosity, 2016, 2015), "Dream Big" (International Space University, 2015), "Speaking with Plants" (University College Dublin Science Expression, 2014), That's About The Size Of It (Dublin City of Science, 2012; Dublin Fringe Festival, 2011), Boys of Foley Street (ANU Productions, Dublin Theatre Festival, 2012).

Her work has been supported by the European Space Agency (2015), Science Foundation Ireland (2014), The Arts Council of Ireland (2014, 2011), Arts@CERN (2011), Show in A Bag (2011), Dublin City Council Drama Bursary (2011).

Shaw is an alumna of MAKE (2011), The SPACE Programme (2011), The Festival of Curiosity Residency (2013), and The Robert Wilson Watermill International Spring Residency, New York (2010).

=== Analog Mars Missions ===
In 2017, she was part of Crew 173 in a simulated Mars mission at the Mars Desert Research Station in southern Utah as the artist and journalist for an international crew of six.

After MDRS-173, she experienced a zero-g flight at the Star City Yuri Gagarin Cosmonaut Training Center.

In 2018, she was an advisor and artist at a new analogue Mars facility, D-MARS, located in the Ramon Crater, Israel, and documented their first analog mission, D-MARS01.

Shaw has worked with Lottie Dolls to create a workshop for young girls, combining drama and space exploration. She has brought along Stargazer Lottie to her Mars Analog mission experiences, both in Utah and Israel, as well as bringing the doll to the zero-g flight in Russia.

Based on her Mars Analog experiences, Shaw joined with Sarah Baxter to create Shaw's third theater show, Diary of a Martian Beekeeper (2018).

=== Television, radio, and print ===
Shaw is a regular contributor on television and radio about science topics and her space adventures. She has appeared on The Tommy Tiernan Show, The Late Late Show, Today show on RTÉ One, and The Seven O'Clock Show on TV3. She has also contributed articles on a variety of space and science-related topics.

=== Honours and awards ===
In 2014, she was named one of Ireland's talented 38 Technology Women.

Shaw won a Science Foundation Ireland Outstanding Contribution to STEM Communication Award in 2018, sharing with Dr. John O'Donoghue of the Royal Society of Chemistry.

On International Women's Day 2019, at a special reception at Áras an Uachtaráin to celebrate Irish Women in STEM, she was invited to respond to Uachtaráin na hEireann, President Michael D. Higgins's speech. She is the 2019/2020 Honorary Ambassador to the Irish Girl Guides.

She was recognised by the European Space Agency as a European Space Champion in 2022 for her work in outstanding space advocacy.
