= James Kavanagh (media personality) =

Irish social media influencer

- Born: 17 July 1989 (age 36); Churchtown, Dublin, Ireland
- Occupations: Social media influencer; television presenter; co-founder of Currabinny
- Partner: William Murray (2013–present)
- Relatives: John Kavanagh (brother)

James Alan Kavanagh (born 17 July 1989) is an Irish social media personality, influencer, entrepreneur, television presenter, podcaster, and occasional DJ. He rose to prominence on Snapchat in 2015 doing vlogs and parodies. He has since gained a large following online, amassing over 110,000 followers across Snapchat, Twitter, Instagram and Facebook. He is admired by his fans for his over-the-top reactions, observational humour and aesthetic choices.

In 2016 Kavanagh and his partner William Murray started the food company Currabinny. Some of the pair's ventures include being finalists on RTÉ's The Taste of Success and producing their first book, The Currabinny Cookbook, which was published by Penguin in 2018 and won EUROSPAR Cookbook of the Year at the 2018 An Post Irish Book Awards.

Kavanagh has worked with many companies as an influencer, including Opel, Irish League of Credit Unions, Durex, Huawei and Coca-Cola as well as with various charities, including UNICEF. In 2018, he began his television career as the co-host of Ireland's Got Talent's companion sister show Ireland's Got Mór Talent on Virgin Media Television.

== Early life ==
Kavanagh was born on 17 July 1989 in Churchtown in Dublin. He has two older siblings, including a brother, John, who founded Straight Blast Gym Ireland. James Kavanagh attended primary school in Good Shepard National Primary School in Churchtown, and attended Wilson's Hospital School for his secondary education.

== Career ==
=== Early work ===
Kavanagh had previously pursued a career in public relations management, starting off in youth marketing company Thinkhouse Ireland in 2010, where he worked with brands such as Kerrygold and Barry's Tea. He then moved to Notorious PSG in 2015.

=== 2015–2016: Social media and rise in popularity ===
Kavanagh took up the social media platform Snapchat in May 2015. He started making vlogs and parodies of other personalities on social media, including parodies of makeup tutorials. He also made videos of him scaring his partner William Murray, by way of sneaking up behind him and yelling his name, which gained the attention of Channel 4's Rude Tube. His videos made appearances on the show, further elevating his image in the media.

In that year, Kavanagh started making regular appearances on the Irish radio station SPIN 1038, where he discussed recommendations of activities to do in Dublin at the weekend, and the TV3 fashion show Xposé.

=== 2016: The beginning of Currabinny ===
In February 2016, Kavanagh left PR management to pursue a career in food with his partner William Murray, a graduate from the Ballymaloe Cookery School. They created the food company Currabinny named after Murray's home at Curraghbinny in County Cork. Their first public appearance was at the Teeling Whiskey Food Market in March 2015, where they sold their own food, including a banana, pecan and white chocolate loaf and "Glamnilla" biscuits, which went viral on Twitter. They made a few more appearances at food festivals around Ireland, including hosting the Teeling Whiskey Harvest Supper in November 2016.

Throughout November of that year, Kavanagh and Murray were contestants on the RTÉ2 cooking competition show The Taste of Success. They entered their pecan and white chocolate banana loaf as their dish. They made it to the semi-finals of the show before losing to Michele Kilkenny.

In April 2016, as part of Autism Awareness Month, James filmed an interview with his nephew Seán on Snapchat, about his personal experience and insight of having autism. The interview gained popularity appearing on the DailyEdge.ie and The Irish Examiner news websites, The Today Show in the United States and Channel 9 in Australia. Parents and schoolteachers called the interview inspirational and gave them an insight of their own children's difficulties with autism.

=== 2018: Television career and The Currabinny Cookbook ===
Kavanagh began his television career in 2018 for the first series of Ireland's Got Talent as the co-host of companion sister show Ireland's Got Mór Talent on TV3 (now Virgin Media Television) alongside Glenda Gilson, and is set to host the upcoming second series beginning in 2019.

In December 2016, Penguin Books approached Currabinny to write a cookbook with their recipes. Kavanagh and Murray produced the pair's first book, The Currabinny Cookbook, and it was published by Penguin on 4 October 2018. On 29 November that year, the book was chosen as the winner of the EUROSPAR Cookbook of the Year at the An Post 2018 Irish Book Awards

As of 2018, Kavanagh has been largely inactive on Snapchat, instead favouring the platform Instagram for the stream of content he is principally known for, which too has a story feature in the vain of the app. He also posts occasionally to a personal YouTube channel that consists of travel vlogs and comedic content, often with more cinematic editing and production values; the earliest video on his channel dates back to 2013, one of many older uploads that have since been removed.

== Personal life ==
Kavanagh is pro-choice and was very prolific and active in his support of the movement to repeal the Eighth Amendment of Bunreacht na hÉireann ahead of the referendum held on it in May 2018.

Kavanagh lives with his partner William Murray, a chef and freelance artist. The two met through the gay hookup app, Grindr. Reluctant to meet at first, as Murray's profile had been blank, Kavanagh has stated that it was William's "superb grammar and punctuation" that led him to eventually meet Murray. In May 2018, the two adopted a Welsh Sphynx cat whom they named after Diana, Princess of Wales.
