= Rebecca Tallon de Havilland =

Irish activist and television host

- Born: Rebecca Tallon; 6 June 1958 (age 67); Granard, County Longford, Ireland
- Occupations: Hairdresser, makeup artist, activist, television presenter
- Known for: First Irish trans woman to host a television series; HIV/AIDS activism
- Notable work: His Name is Rebecca (2010)

Rebecca Tallon de Havilland (born 6 June 1958) is an Irish transgender rights and HIV/AIDS activist and television host. In 2024, she presented Second Chances on Virgin Media Television; Irish media described it as the first Irish TV series presented by a trans woman.

== Biography ==
Tallon de Havilland was born and spent her early childhood in Granard, County Longford. She moved to Dublin aged seven. She moved to London in her twenties, pursuing a career as a hairdresser and makeup artist. While in London, she came out as a transgender woman. In 1987, when about to undergo gender confirmation surgery, she was diagnosed with HIV, and told she had two years to live. In 1991, while working as a model, she was outed on the front page of an Irish national newspaper, at a time when she had not yet told her family in Ireland of her intention to undergo surgery. She said that articles about her in the Irish press were of a "sexualised Page Three nature". Negative media coverage and the resultant damage to her career contributed to alcohol and drug issues.

In the early 2000s, she became the first transgender woman in Ireland to change the sex marker on her passport. She became sober while living in Belfast in the mid-2000s. She began campaigning in the area of sexual health in the early 2010s, writing for Boyz and working with the Terrence Higgins Trust. Tallon de Havilland moved back to Dublin in 2022. The same year, she led the Pride section of the Dublin Saint Patrick's Day Parade. In 2023, she was a guest on The Tommy Tiernan Show. In 2024, she hosted a television series, Second Chances, for Virgin Media Television, in which she helped participants overcome obstacles relating to addiction, abusive relationships and other issues. It was the first time a TV series in Ireland had been presented by a trans woman.

== Bibliography ==
- Tallon de Havilland, Rebecca (2010). His Name is Rebecca. Poolbeg Press. ISBN 9781842234440.
