= Malin, County Donegal =

Village in County Donegal, Ireland

Malin Málainn
- Village
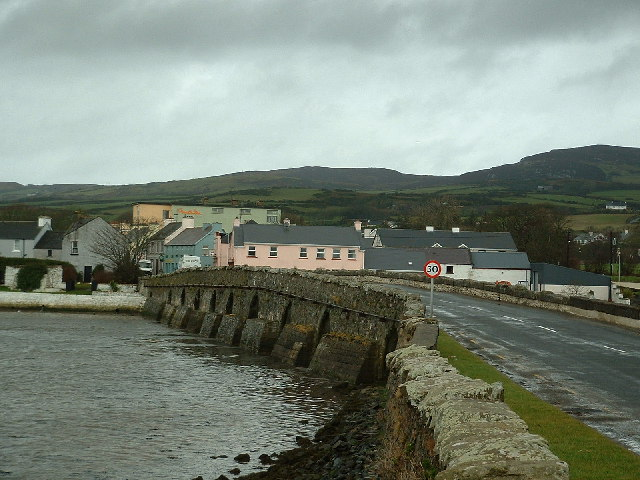
- Malin Bridge

- Location in Ireland
- Coordinates: 55°15′N 7°16′W
- Country: Ireland
- Province: Ulster
- County: County Donegal

Government
  - Dáil constituency: Donegal
  - EU Parliament: North–West

Population (2022)
  - Total: 154
- Time zone: UTC+0 (WET)
  - Summer (DST): UTC-1 (IST (WEST))
- Irish Grid Reference: C467453

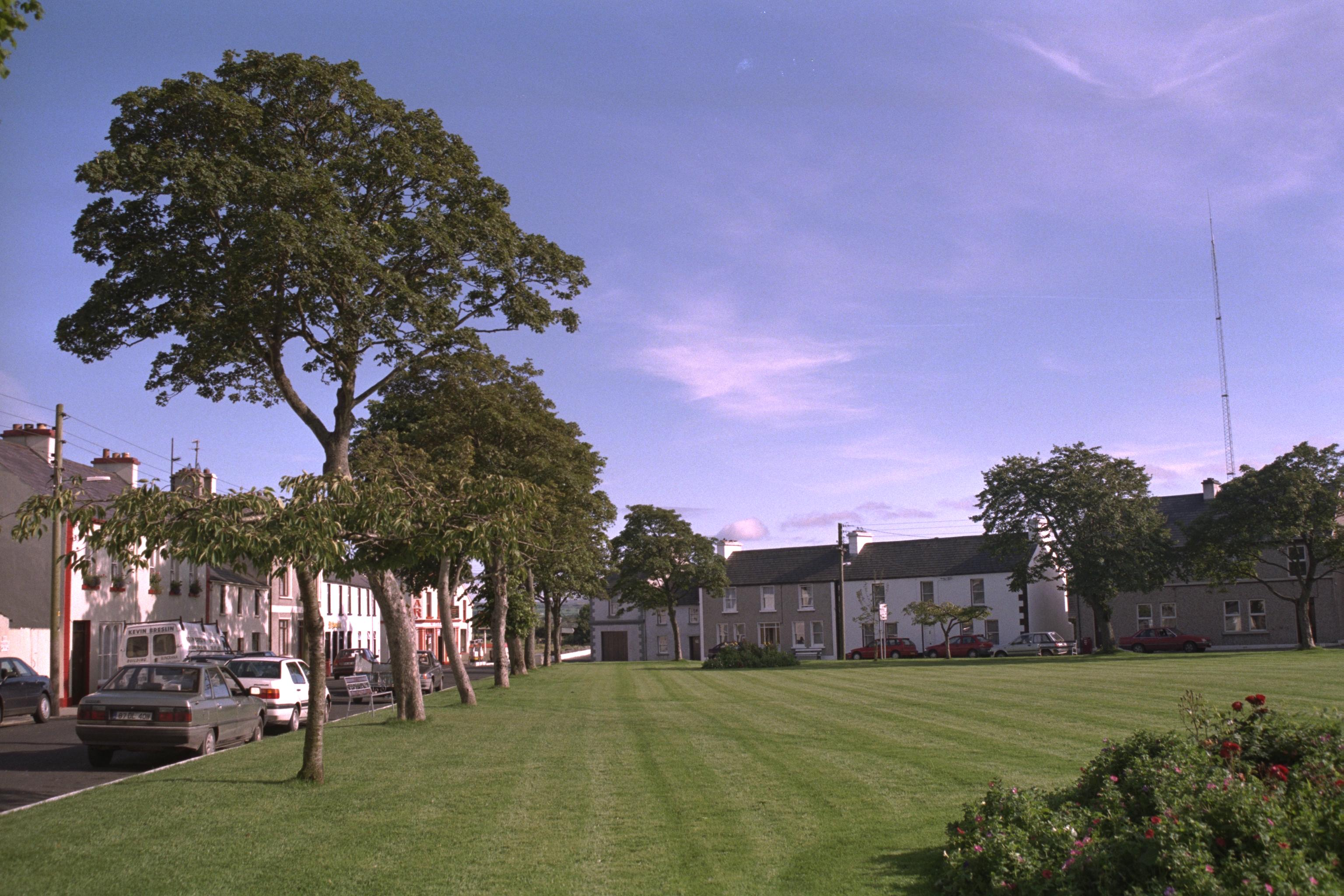
Malin in 1996

Malin (Irish: Málainn) is a village in County Donegal, Ireland, situated 6 km (4 mi) north of Carndonagh. A further 13 km (8 mi) north further is Malin Head, the most northerly point of the island of Ireland. It was a planned settlement plotted around a triangular green. Malin won the Irish Tidy Towns Competition in 1970 and 1991.

== Sport ==
The village's GAA club, also called Malin, is considered a senior football club; it is the most northern-located GAA club in Ireland. The Malin 5k run is held annually, and there is also a raft race which takes place to raise funds for the RNLI.

== Tidy towns ==
Malin has won the Tidy Towns contest twice, and earned a Bronze in 2002.

== Notable people ==
- The Rev. William Elder, politician and clergyman in Canada
- The Irish folk music trio The Henry Girls are from Malin.
- Sir William McArthur, Lord Mayor of London

== See also ==
- List of populated places in the Republic of Ireland
