= Ireland's Got Talent series 1 =

Ireland's Got Talent
- Series 1
- Presented by: Lucy Kennedy
- Judges: Denise van Outen; Jason Byrne; Michelle Visage; Louis Walsh
- Winner: RDC
- Runners-up: FKFT; Xquisite

Release
- Original network: TV3
- Original release: 3 February – 24 March 2018

Series chronology
- Next → Series 2

The first series of the Irish talent competition series Ireland's Got Talent began broadcasting in Ireland during 2018, from 3 February to 24 March 2018 on TV3 and was hosted by Lucy Kennedy.

The judges for the first series were Denise van Outen, Jason Byrne, Michelle Visage and Louis Walsh.

The inaugural series was won by the dance troupe RDC.

According to the Irish Times, the debut episode attracted 521,800 viewers.

== Series overview ==
The judges' auditions were taped in November 2017 at the TLT Concert Hall & Theatre, Drogheda. The live shows were held at The Helix, Dublin which started on 19 March 2018, continuing at 21 March until the 24th for the final.

- Winner
- Runners-up
- Finalist
- Semi-finalist (lost judges' or public vote)
- Golden buzzer
- Wildcard (previously eliminated act reinstated to the final)

Name of act	Age(s)	Genre	Act	Semi-final	Result
Aaron J. Hart	24	Singing	Rapper	3	Finalist
Affia Ni Fhaolain	18	Singing / Music	Singer & Pianist	3	Eliminated
Atlantic Rhythm	N/A	Dance	Dance Group	3	Eliminated (Lost Judges' Vote)
Christopher King	29	Singing	Singer	1	Eliminated
Deaftones	13-22	Singing	Choir	2	Eliminated (Lost Judges' Vote)
Double Impact	9 & 12	Dance	Contemporary Dance Duo	2	Finalist
Evelyn Williams	81	Singing	Singer	3	Eliminated
FKFT	N/A	Dance	Hip Hop Dance Group	1	Runners-up
Grim Squeaker	33	Danger	Sideshow Act	3	Eliminated
Keeva Air Candy	32	Acrobatics	Aerialist	1	Eliminated
Linda McLoughlin	38	Singing	Singer	1	Finalist
Martin McGuinness	51	Singing	Drag Act	2	Eliminated
Matt Dodd	68	Singing	Singer	1	Finalist
Mini Puppet Popstars	N/A	Comedy	Puppeteer Group	1	Eliminated
Paul Ryder	30	Singing	Drag Act	1	Eliminated (Lost Judges' Vote)
Philip Murphy	72	Singing	Singer	3	Eliminated
RDC	12-22	Dance	Dance Group	2	Winner
Ronan Brady	31	Acrobatics	Cyr Wheel Acrobat	3	Eliminated
Sean Hegarty	34	Comedy	Comedian	2	Eliminated
Shaniah Rollo	13	Singing	Singer	2	Eliminated
Steve Barry	31	Singing	Opera Singer	2	Eliminated
Tamara Operi	28	Singing	Rapper	1	Eliminated
Xquisite	8-11	Dance	Dance Group	3	Runners-up
Zacc Milne	19	Dance	Dancer	2	Finalist

=== Semi-finals summary ===
Buzzed out | Judges' vote | Won the Public's Vote | Won the Judges' Vote
Lost Judges' Vote | Eliminated

==== Semi-final 1 (19 March) ====
- Guest performance: Tokio Myers

Semi-Finalist	Order	Buzzes and judges' votes				Result
Semi-Finalist	Order	Walsh	Visage	Byrne	Outen	Result
FKFT	1					Advanced (Won Public Vote)
Matt Dodd	2					Eliminated
Tamara Operi	3					Eliminated
Keeva Air Candy	4					Eliminated
Christopher King	5					Eliminated
Mini Puppet Popstars	6					Eliminated
Linda McLoughlin	7					Advanced (Won Judges' Vote)
Paul Ryder	8		^{1}			Eliminated (Lost Judges' Vote)

- ^1Visage did not cast her vote due to the majority support for Linda McLoughlin from the other judges, but admitted on Ireland's Got Mór Talent that her voting intention would have been for Paul Ryder.

==== Semi-final 2 (21 March) ====
Semi-Finalist	Order	Buzzes and judges' votes				Result
Semi-Finalist	Order	Walsh	Visage	Byrne	Outen	Result
RDC	1					Advanced (Won Public Vote)
Steve Barry	2					Eliminated
Double Impact	3					Advanced (Won Judges' Vote)
Martin McGuinness	4					Eliminated
Shaniah Rollo	5					Eliminated
Sean Hegarty	6					Eliminated
Deaftones	7				^{2}	Eliminated (Lost Judges' Vote)
Zacc Milne	8					Eliminated

- ^2Van Outen did not cast her vote due to the majority support for Double Impact from the other judges, but admitted that her voting intention would have been for Deaftones.

==== Semi-final 3 (22 March) ====
Semi-Finalist	Order	Buzzes and judges' votes				Result
Semi-Finalist	Order	Walsh	Visage	Byrne	Outen	Result
Atlantic Rhythm	1					3rd (Lost Judges' Save)
Affia Ni Fhaolain	2					Eliminated
Xquisite	3					1st (Won Public Vote)
Ronan Brady	4					Eliminated
Evelyn Williams	5					Eliminated
Grim Squeaker	6					Eliminated
Aaron J. Hart	7		^{3}			2nd (Won Judges' Vote)
Philip Murphy	8					Eliminated

- ^3Visage did not cast her vote due to the majority support for Aaron J. Hart from the other judges, but admitted that her voting intention would have been for this semi-finalist.

=== Final (24 March) ===
Contestant	Order	Finished
Double Impact	1	Bottom 5
Linda McLoughlin	2	Bottom 5
RDC	3	Winner
FKFT	4	Top 3
Aaron J. Hart	5	Bottom 5
Matt Dodd	6	Bottom 5
Xquisite	7	Top 3
Zacc Milne	8	Bottom 5
