= Ireland's Got Talent series 2 =

Ireland's Got Talent
- Series 2
- Hosted by: Lucy Kennedy
- Judges: Denise van Outen; Jason Byrne; Michelle Visage; Louis Walsh
- Winner: BSD
- Runners-up: Fly Youth; Rebel Acro

Release
- Original network: Virgin Media One
- Original release: 2 February – 7 April 2019

Series chronology
- ← Previous; Series 1

The second and final series of the Irish talent competition series Ireland's Got Talent began broadcasting in Ireland on 2 February 2019 on Virgin Media One and was hosted by Lucy Kennedy.

Denise van Outen, Jason Byrne, Michelle Visage and Louis Walsh returned as judges for the second series.

The series was won by Dublin dance group BSD. They had received the golden buzzer from Jason Byrne. Dance group Fly Youth and gymnastics group Rebel Acro finished in the runner-up position.

== Series overview ==
The judges auditions were taped in November 2018 at The Helix, Dublin.

- Winner
- Runners-up
- Finalist
- Semi-finalist (lost judges' or public vote)
- Golden buzzer
- Wildcard (previously eliminated act reinstated to the final)

Name of act	Age(s)	Genre	Act	Semi-final	Result
Aidan McCann	9	Magic	Close Up Magician	1	Eliminated (Lost Judges' Vote)
Barry Darcy	38	Singing	Singer	3	Eliminated
BSD	10-17	Dance	Dance Group	2	Winner
Declan Colgan	20	Singing / Music	Singer & Pianist	1	Eliminated
Fionn McMorrow	10	Dance	Contemporary Dancer	3	Finalist
Flair	31-36	Acrobatics	Aerial Group	3	Eliminated
Fly Youth	13-18	Dance	Dance Group	1	Runners-up
Hiphopical	5-18	Dance	Dance Group	2	Eliminated (Lost Judges' Vote)
Iveta Tumasonyte	14	Singing	Singer	3	Eliminated
Jake O'Shea	25	Dance	Irish Dancer	3	Finalist
Johnny Quinn	60	Music	Yodeller	2	Eliminated
Julie McCabe	30	Singing	Singer	3	Eliminated (Lost Judges' Vote)
Liv Gregorio	8	Singing	Singer	1	Eliminated
MC Daycent	25	Singing	Rapper	1	Eliminated
MC Notn	39	Music	Beatboxer	3	Eliminated
One Island Clan	21-28	Acrobatics	Parkour Group	1	Eliminated
Rebel Acro	10-18	Acrobatics	Acrobatic Group	2	Runners-up
Robyn Diamonds	25	Singing	Drag Act	2	Eliminated
Rodelle Borja	29	Singing	Singer	2	Eliminated
Sea Of Change	34-70	Singing	Choir	2	Finalist
Sharon & Brandon	41 & 19	Singing	Singing Duo	1	Finalist
Sharyn Ward	33	Singing	Singer	1	Finalist
Storm	22	Singing	Singer	3	Eliminated
Tara Jamieson	23	Singing / Music	Singer & Pianist	2	Eliminated

=== Semi-finals summary ===
- Won the public vote
- Won the judges' vote (or public vote if split decision)
- Lost the judges' vote (or public vote if split decision)
- Wildcard (previously eliminated act reinstated to the final)
- Golden buzzer
- Buzzed out
- Judge's vote

==== Semi-final 1 (30 March) ====
- Guest performer: Mabel ("Don't Call Me Up")

Contestant	Order	Buzzes and judges' votes				Result
Contestant	Order	Van Outen	Byrne	Visage	Walsh	Result
MC Daycent	1					Eliminated
Declan Colgan	2					Eliminated
One Island Clan	3					Eliminated
Liv Gregorio	4					Eliminated
Fly Youth	5					1st (Won Public Vote)
Sharon & Brandon	6					Wildcard
Aidan McCann	7	^{1}				3rd (Lost Judges' Vote)
Sharyn Ward	8					2nd (Won Judges' Vote)

- ^1Van Outen did not cast her vote due to the majority support for Sharyn Ward from the other judges, but admitted that her voting intention would have been for Aidan McCann.

==== Semi-final 2 (31 March) ====
- Guest performer: Riverdance

Contestant	Order	Buzzes and judges' votes				Result
Contestant	Order	Van Outen	Byrne	Visage	Walsh	Result
Hiphopical	1					3rd (Lost Judges' Vote)
Tara Jamieson	2					Eliminated
BSD	3					1st (Won Public Vote)
Johnny Quinn	4					Eliminated
Rodelle Borja	5					Eliminated
Rebel Acro	6	^{2}				2nd (Won Judges' Vote)
Sea Of Change	7					Wildcard
Robyn Diamonds	8					Eliminated

- ^2Van Outen did not cast her vote due to the majority support for Rebel Acro from the other judges, but admitted that her voting intention would have been for this semi-finalist.

==== Semi-final 3 (6 April) ====
- Guest performer: Aslan

Contestant	Order	Buzzes and judges' votes				Result
Contestant	Order	Van Outen	Byrne	Visage	Walsh	Result
Storm	1					Eliminated
Flair	2					Eliminated
Barry Darcy	3					Eliminated
Iveta Tumasonyte	4					Eliminated
Fionn McMorrow	5					1st (Won Public Vote)
MC Notn	6					Eliminated
Julie McCabe	7				^{3}	3rd (Lost Judges' Vote)
Jake O'Shea	8					2nd (Won Judges' Vote)

- ^3Walsh did not cast his vote due to the majority support for Jake O'Shea from the other judges, but admitted that his voting intention would have been for Julie McCabe.

=== Final (7 April) ===
- Guest Performer: RDC (Series 1 winners) with Lyra, and Lewis Capaldi

Contestant	Order	Finished
Rebel Acro	1	Top 3
BSD	2	Winner
Sharon and Brandon	3	Bottom 5
Jake O’Shea	4	Bottom 5
Sea of Change	5	Bottom 5
Sharyn Ward	6	Bottom 5
Fionn McMorrow	7	Bottom 5
Fly Youth	8	Top 3
