= Glenda Gilson =

Irish model and television presenter

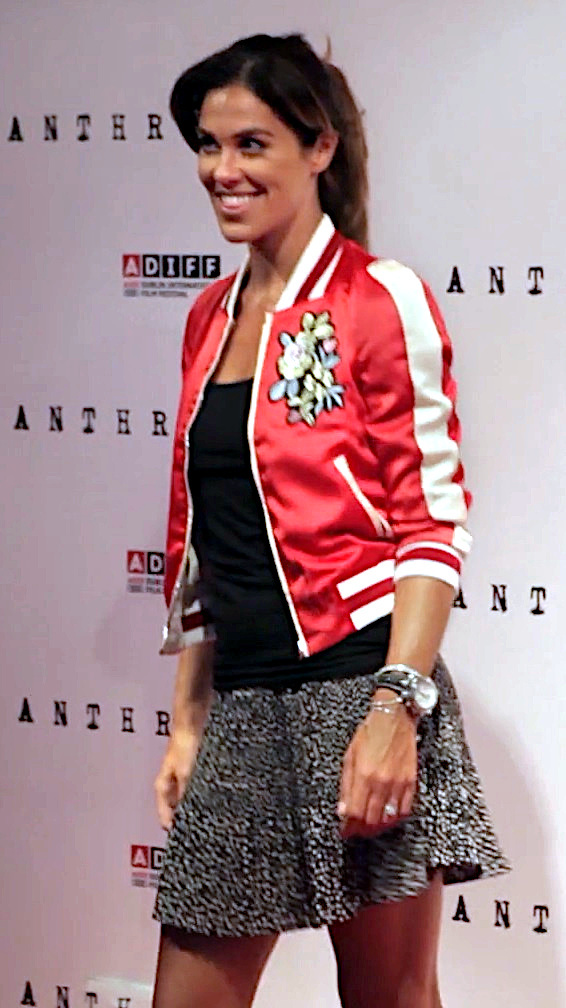
- Gilson at ADIFF 2016
- Born: 3 March 1981 (age 45); Tallaght, Dublin, Ireland
- Modelling information
- Height: 1.78 m (5 ft 10 in)
- Hair colour: Brown
- Eye colour: Green

Glenda Gilson (born 3 March 1981) is an Irish former model and television presenter.

== Career ==
=== Beauty ===
Gilson represented Ireland in the Miss Hawaiian Tropic in 2002 in Oahu and went on to win the title for Europe. Her success secured widespread international exposure, as she appeared in the pages of Cosmopolitan, Marie Claire and Company and Ireland's own VIP.

=== Presenting ===
In 2006, Gilson embarked on a presenting career, appearing as the face of Irish music channel Bubble Hits hosting the news and entertainment show Glenda's Showbiz Gossip. She presented Xposé from 2008 until its cancellation in 2019.

In March 2008, she appeared as a contestant on the RTÉ reality show, Celebrity Bainisteoir.

In 2012, Gilson appeared as a contestant on the TV3 reality show, Celebrity Salon.

In December 2017, Gilson was announced as the host of Ireland's Got Talent companion-series Ireland's Got Mór Talent alongside social media star, James Kavanagh. Gilson and Kavanagh returned for a second and final series in 2019.

In 2020, Gilson participated in the fourth season of the Irish edition of Dancing with the Stars. Gilson and her professional partner, Robert Rowiński, were eliminated on 26 January 2020.

=== Legal difficulties ===
Gilson and her brother Damien could face jail after consistently refusing to comply with court orders in relation to the liquidation of their car company. Justice Mary Finlay Geoghegan said in May 2011 that Ms Gilson and her brother are “not compliant” with the rules and described the situation as “extremely serious” and “the motion for attachment and committal still stands.” In 2012 Gilson was revealed to be a tax defaulter. On 14 September 2012 she was named on the Revenue list of tax defaulters as having been required to pay €73,000 including interest and penalties. In April 2015 she was in the Irish High Court to block attempts, by the liquidator of a company where she was a non-executive director, to impose certain restriction on her from acting as a company director for a period of five years.

== Personal life ==
Gilson is a niece of former Fianna Fáil politician Liam Lawlor, who died in a car accident in Russia in October 2005. She was at one stage involved in a high-profile relationship with then-Irish rugby captain Brian O'Driscoll.

In August 2014, Gilson married Dublin businessman Rob MacNaughton at St Senan's Church in Kilrush, County Clare. They have two sons.
