= The Jades (Irish band) =

Irish rock group

Background information
- Also known as: Jade
- Origin: Wexford, Ireland
- Years active: 2002–?
- Labels: Rag Doll
- Website: Official website

The Jades, formerly known as Jade, are an Irish all-female rock group from Kilmuckridge, County Wexford, Ireland. The Jades' line-up consists of sisters Sheila and Yvonne on lead vocals, guitar, and drums respectively, with friend Elaine on guitar and backing vocals.

== Background ==
Before the band came together, each member had built up considerable experience performing locally in musicals and shows, but The Jades was the first formal band any of them joined when they came together after finishing school. They first came to public attention in Ireland through their colourful live shows and their appearances on the RTÉ series You're a Star.

== You're A Star ==
The band first came to prominence in 2005, on the Irish TV series You're a Star, which was a competition to determine who would represent Ireland in the Eurovision Song Contest 2005. The band then known as 'Jade', which they later changed. During the show they were known for their lively, colourful performances, but came second to Donna and Joseph McCaul, a brother-and-sister act from Westmeath.

== Amber Skies ==
The Jades worked on their debut album Amber Skies, with David Odlum producing. The first fruit of their combined efforts titled "Sooner or Later", was released on 16 May 2009, on their own Rag Doll label. The single has already been described by one music industry insider as "a pounding slice of melodic pop/rock with harmonies to die for".

All of the tracks on their forthcoming album are originals by The Jades, who pride themselves on being one of the few all-female bands in Ireland writing their own songs and playing their own instruments. According to guitarist and backing vocalist Elaine, "We’ve recorded the album, including the single, mostly in Wexford and in Sun Studios in Temple Bar and then we spent ten days in France to add the finishing touches. We’re really excited about getting the album done and getting the single out. We’re also looking forward to doing some live gigs after having been in the studio for so much of last year".

The album was released on 14 August 2009 with a show at Crawdaddy.

List of songs on Amber Skies

1. "Bermuda Song"
2. "Last Laugh"
3. "Sooner or Later"
4. "Beautiful Thing"
5. "Loser"
6. "The Way"
7. "Look at Me Now"
8. "Over And Over"
9. "You And Me"
10. "You in the Corner"

Performances included; 12 July 2009 Oxegen, Punchestown; 18 July 2009 Dunbrody Festival, New Ross; 1 August 2009 Mitchelstown Festival, Cork; and 14 August 2009 Crawdaddy, Dublin.
