= The Henry Girls =

Irish folk group

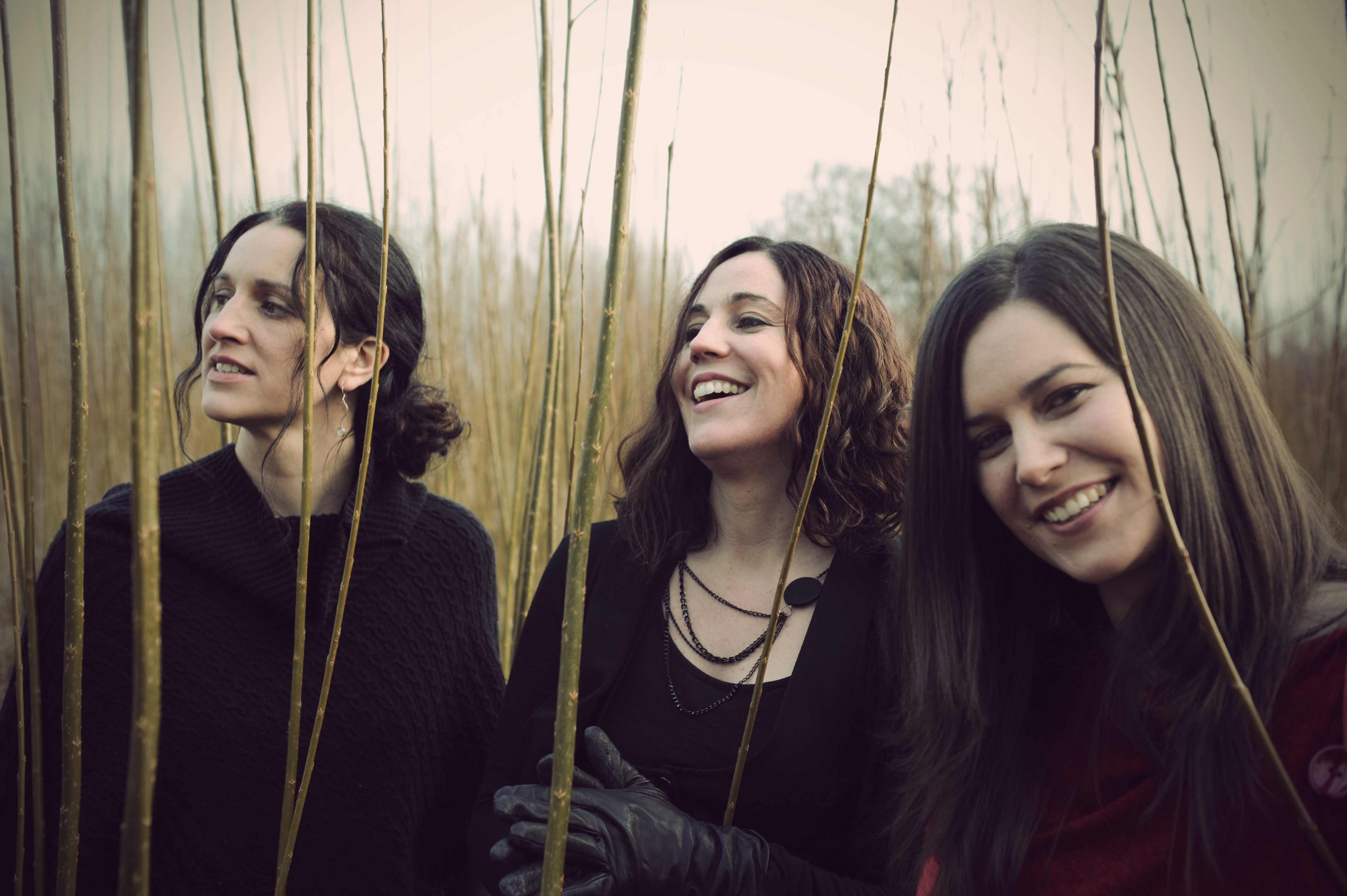
- The Henry Girls in 2008

Background information
- Origin: Malin, County Donegal, Ireland
- Genres: Folk rock; roots rock
- Members: Karen McLaughlin; Lorna McLaughlin; Joleen McLaughlin
- Website: thehenrygirls.com

The Henry Girls are an Irish folk and roots music group. The band consists of three sisters: Karen, Lorna and Joleen McLaughlin. All three have studied music at university level and are multi-instrumentalist, utilizing fiddles, ukulele, banjo, guitar, harp, mandolin, piano, and accordion. The Henry Girls often sing in harmony and their sound has been described as a mix of traditional Irish folk music and Americana. They have contributed backup vocals to Mary Black's album Stories from the Steeples. They have also collaborated with Session Americana, Dónal Lunny, Moya Brennan, Jennifer Kimball, and The Fox Hunt.

== History ==
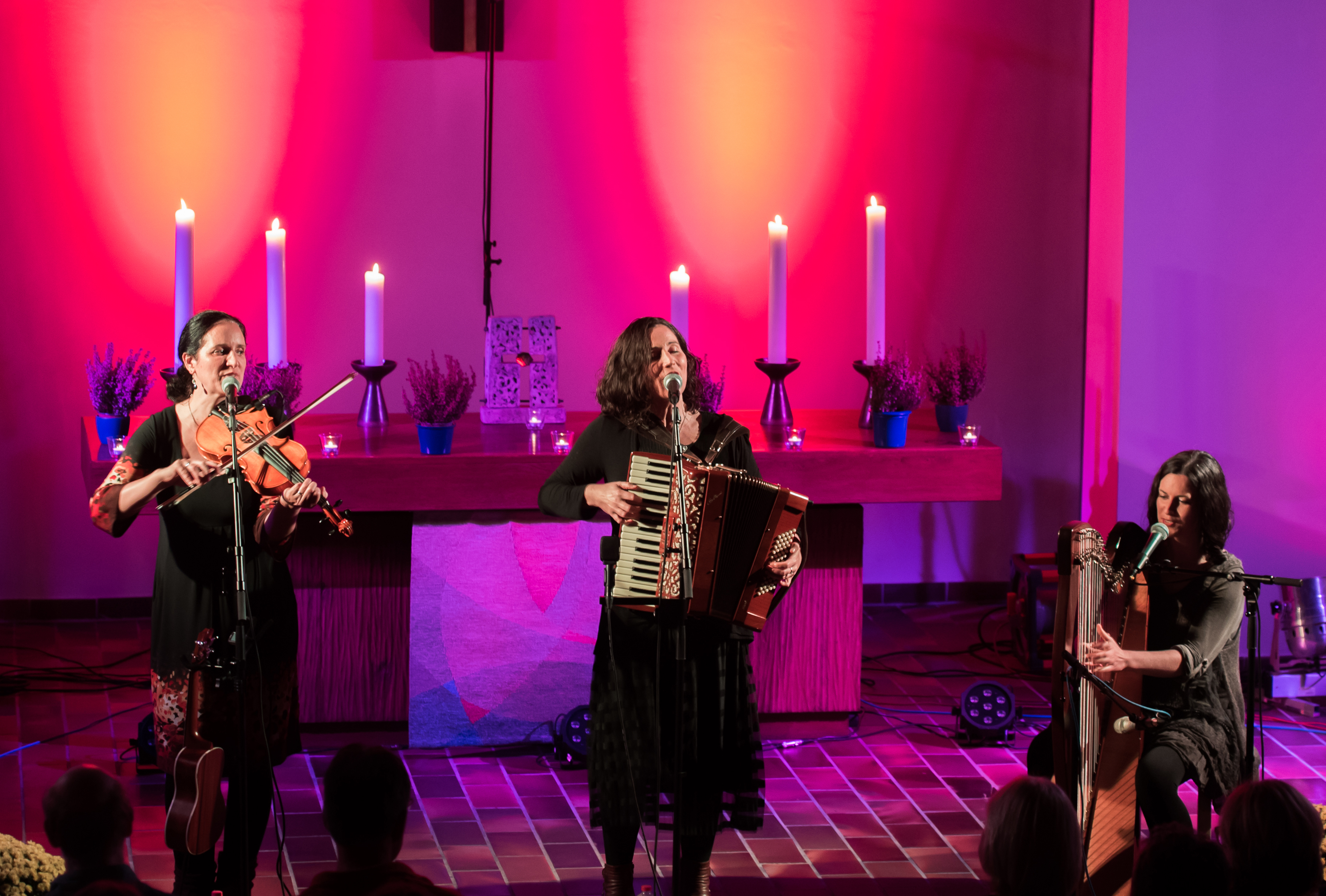
The Henry Girls performing at Lottes Musiknacht 2018

The McLaughlin sisters are from Malin in Inishowen, County Donegal, Ireland. They formed the band over 10 years ago. They named the band after their grandfather. They released their debut album, Between Us, in 2003, and was produced by Máire Breatnach. They released their album Dawn in 2010, and that year they were nominated for an Irish Film and Television Award for Best Original Score for the film A Shine of Rainbows, which featured songs from the album Dawn.

== December Moon ==
In 2011 they released their album December Moon. The album features all original songs but four, including a cover of Elvis Costello's "Watching the Detectives." It was produced by Calum Malcolm.

== Louder Than Words ==
In early 2014, the trio released the album Louder than Words.

== Members ==
Members at Lottes Musiknacht 2018

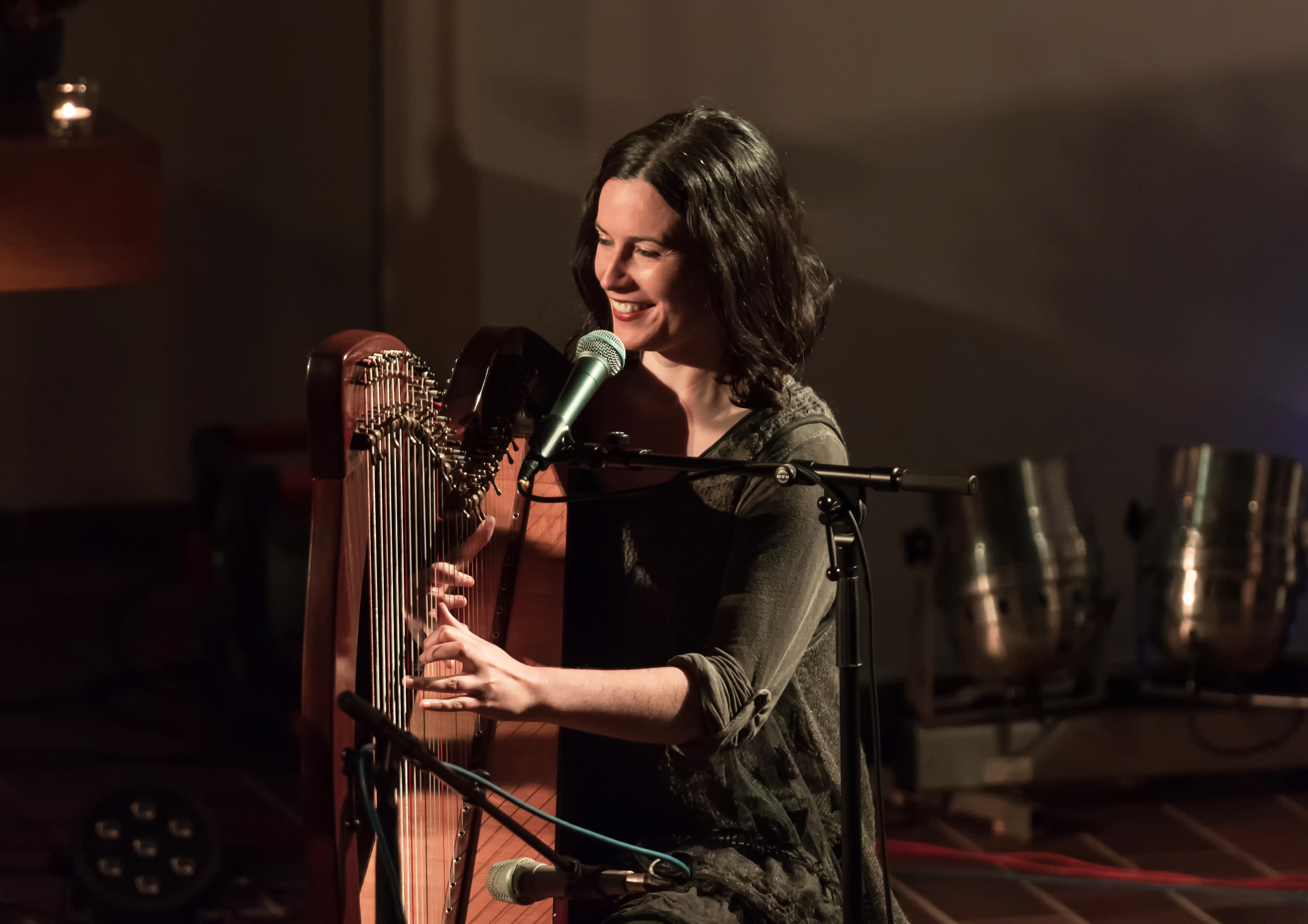
Joleen

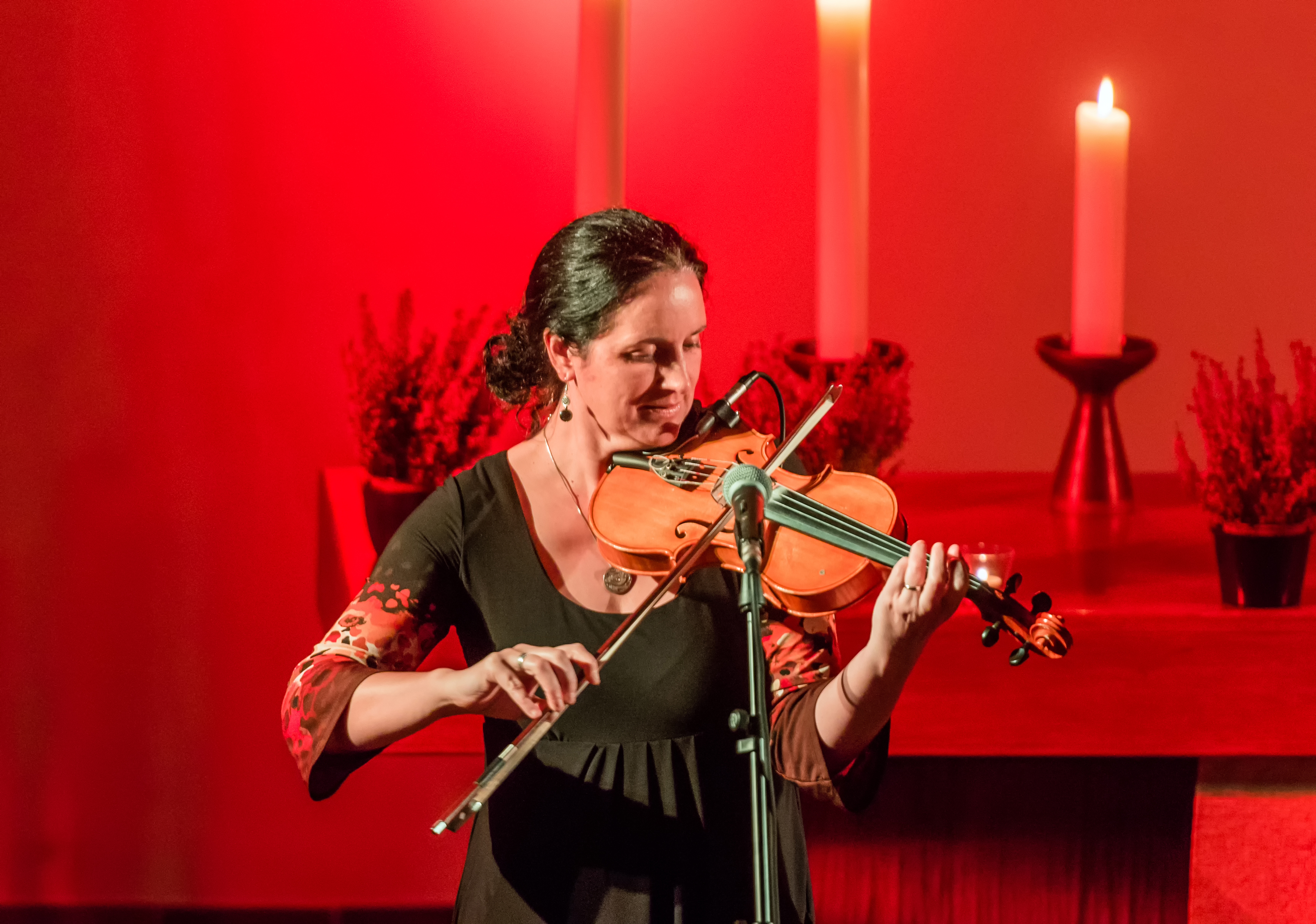
Karen

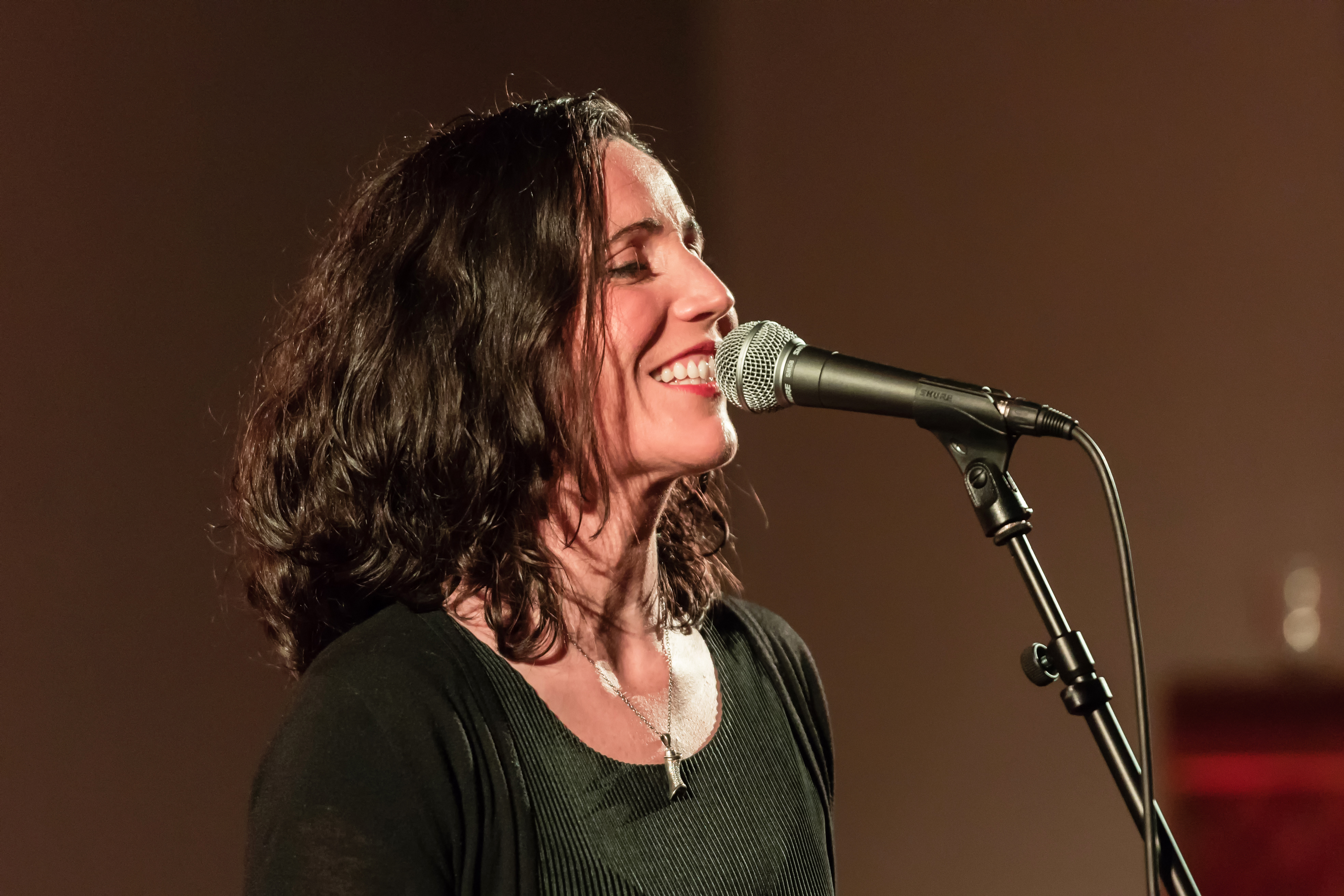
Lorna

== Discography ==
=== Albums ===
Year	Album
2003	Between Us
2007	Morning Rush
2009	Dawn
2011	December Moon
2014	Louder Than Words
2017	Far Beyond The Stars
2020	Shout Sister Shout (Performed Live by the Henry Girls)
2024	A Time To Grow

=== Singles ===
Year	Single	Album
2013	"Maybe"	Louder Than Words
2014	"The Weather"	Louder Than Words
2023	"A Time To Grow"	A Time To Grow
2023	"Not Your Fight"	A Time To Grow
