= Ireland's Got Talent =

Television series

- Genre: Talent show
- Created by: Simon Cowell
- Presented by: Lucy Kennedy
- Judges: Louis Walsh; Michelle Visage; Denise van Outen; Jason Byrne
- Country of origin: Ireland
- Original language: English
- No. of series: 2
- No. of episodes: 24

Production
- Executive producers: Shane Byrne; Darren Smith; Stephen Stewart
- Running time: 60–120 minutes (inc. adverts)
- Production companies: Kite Productions; Green Inc

Original release
- Network: Virgin Media One
- Release: 3 February 2018 – 7 April 2019

Related
- The All Ireland Talent Show; Got Talent (franchise)

Ireland's Got Talent is the Irish version of the international Got Talent franchise. The series launched on 3 February 2018 on Virgin Media One (formerly known as "TV3") and was hosted by Lucy Kennedy, accompanied by a sister show entitled Ireland's Got Mór Talent presented by Glenda Gilson and James Kavanagh.

Contestants of any age, who possess some sort of talent, can audition for the show, with their performance judged by a panel of judges; the lineup consisted of Denise van Outen, Jason Byrne, Michelle Visage and Louis Walsh. Those who make it through the auditions compete against other acts in a series of live semi-finals, with the winning two acts of each semi-final proceeding into the show's live final. The prize for winning the contest is a €50,000 cash prize as well as their own primetime Christmas television special on Virgin Media One.

The series was cancelled in July 2019.

== History ==
A previous Irish version of the Got Talent franchise, entitled The All Ireland Talent Show aired between 2009 and 2011. In the mid 2010s, it was announced that current The X Factor judge, Louis Walsh, would be launching a new Irish talent show, produced by Simon Cowell, with himself as a judge. The show was expected to be premiered in 2017 or 2018. Walsh later stated that he would like to broadcast an Irish edition of Got Talent, though he stated that the untitled talent show was only in early development. RTÉ One and TV3 showed interest in ordering the programme, however, TV3 originally turned down the show in 2016. It was reported that Cowell would be a special guest judge on the programme during the series' launch, but this did not happen.

In February 2016, RTÉ One denied that The Voice of Ireland would be cancelled in order to broadcast the new talent show. However, the show was later replaced by Dancing with the Stars. In August 2017, it was reported that Lucy Kennedy would host the show, with Walsh later confirming himself and Michelle Visage on ITV's This Morning as two of the judges on the show which will launch in January 2018. The series was announced during a press conference at the National Concert Hall in Dublin on 30 August 2017, with Denise van Outen and comedian Jason Byrne confirmed as the other two judges.

Glenda Gilson and James Kavanagh present the sister show, Ireland’s Got Mór Talent.

=== Judges ===
Judges gallery

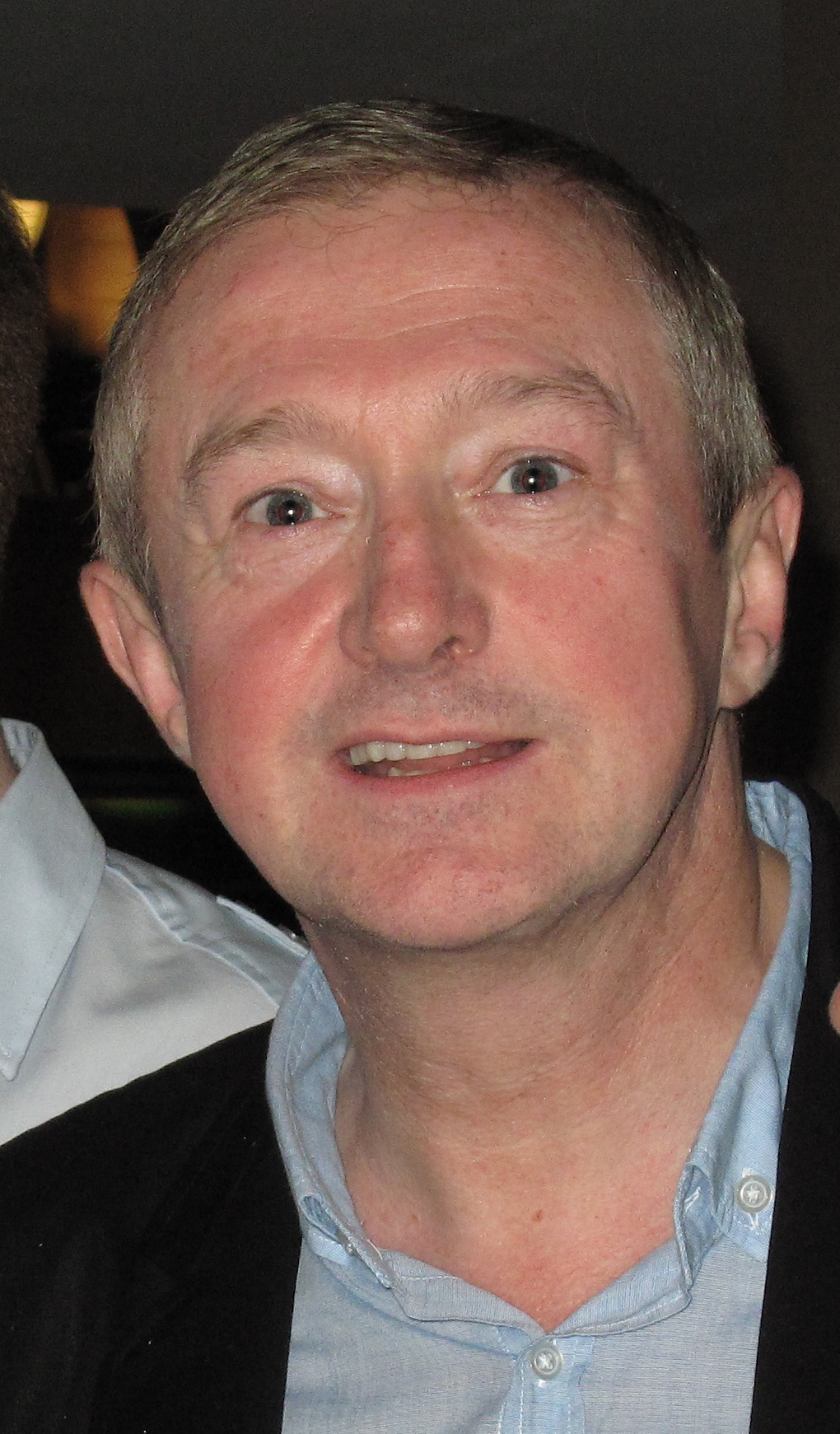
Louis Walsh
(2018–2019)

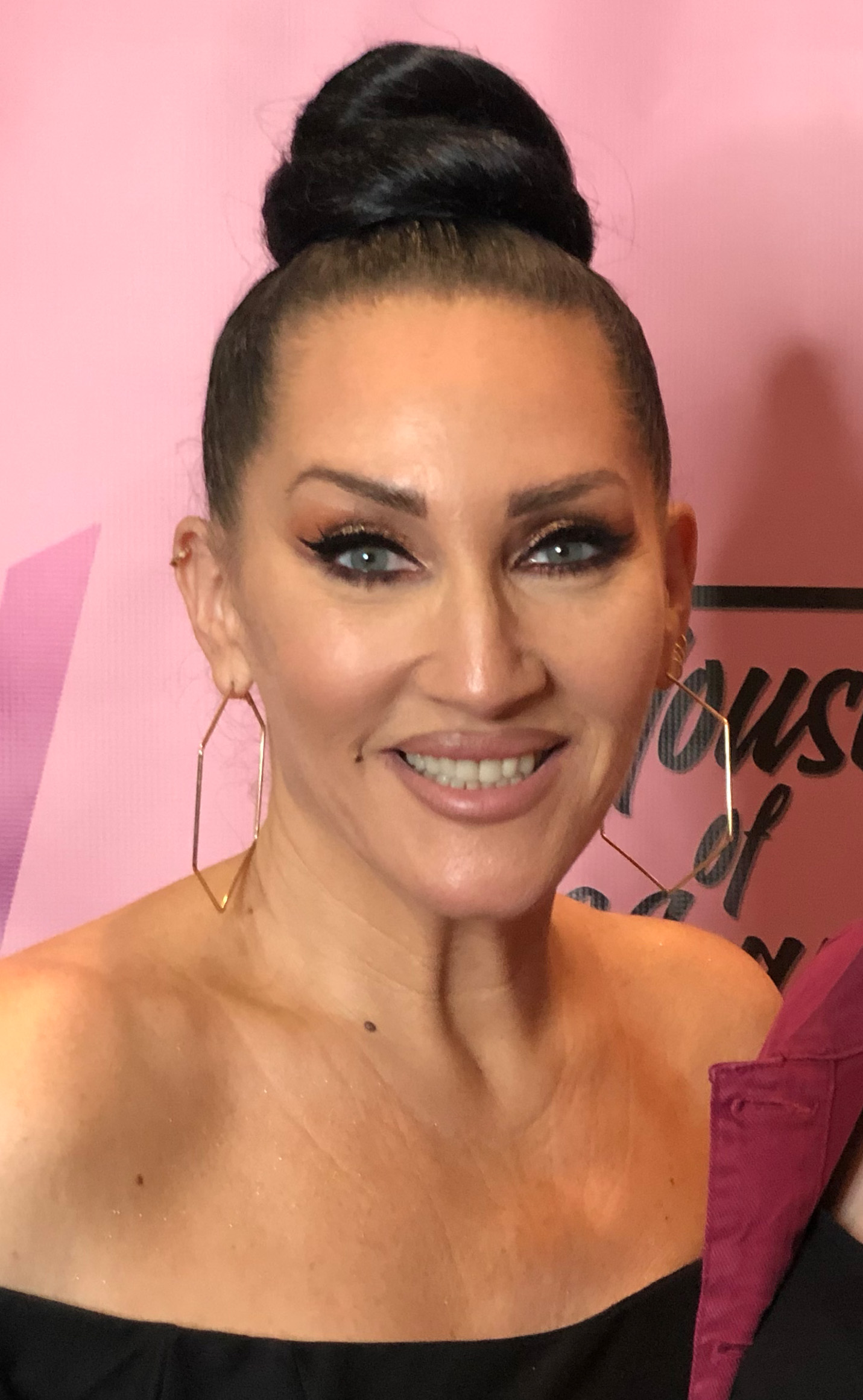
Michelle Visage
(2018–2019)

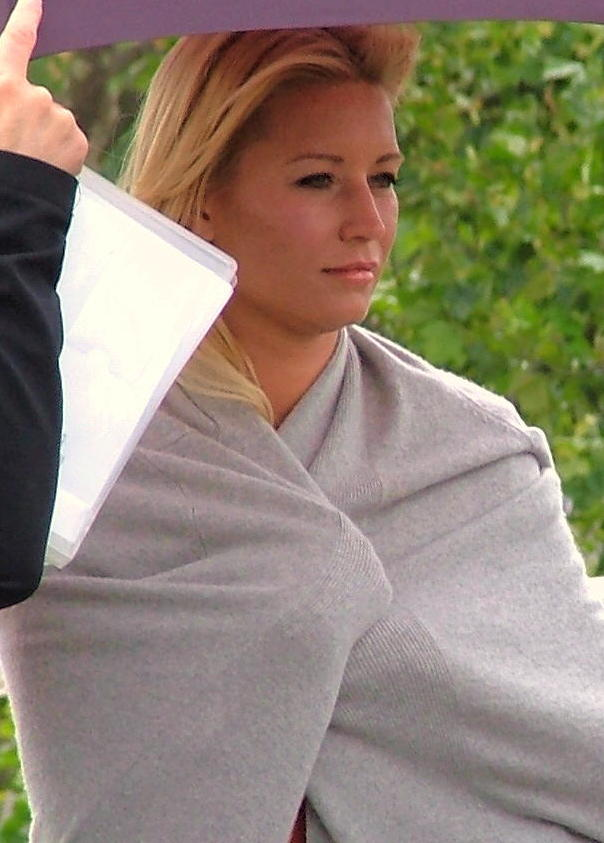
Denise van Outen
(2018–2019)

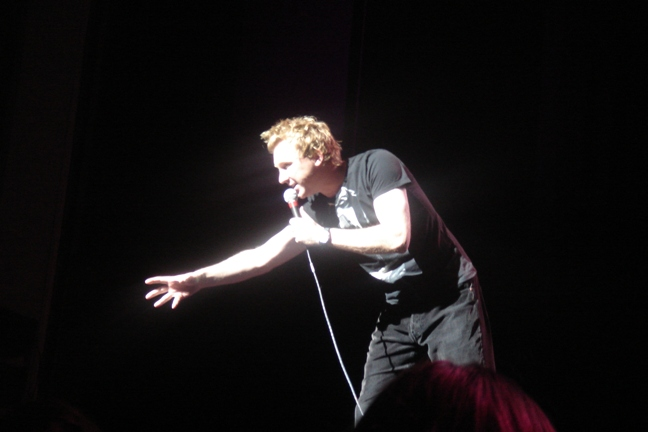
Jason Byrne
(2018–2019)

== Format ==
=== Auditions ===
The show holds two rounds of auditions for contestants. The first round, referred to as the "open auditions", is held across several different cities around Ireland during the Autumn months. The second round, referred to as the "Judges' Auditions", is held, before the broadcast of the show later that year during spring or early summer – these auditions consist of the contestants who made it through the first round and are held within a select set of cities. For the Judges' Auditions, each site used for these is located within a theatre or convention hall. These sites are primarily chosen for the purpose of having facilities that can handle large volumes of contestants, with each set up into three arrangements when auditions are taking place: a waiting area for contestants to prepare and await their turn to perform, with monitors to allow them to see the performances of other contestants; the wings, where a contestant enters and leaves from, and where friends and family of the contestant can view them from; and the main stage, where the contestant performs their act before the judging panel, who are located in front of the stage. The main stage area is usually modified to include the judges' panel desk, along with a special lighting rig above the stage, consisting of Xs that each have the name of a judge under them.

Each contestant that auditions is given a number by the production team and remains in the waiting area until called out into the wings, giving them a certain amount of time to prepare their act. Upon being allowed onto the main stage, they will usually be asked by one of the judges for their name and what they plan to perform, along with other details such as age, occupation, personal background, and what they wish to achieve if they won. After this, they are then given three minutes to conduct their performance before both the judges and a live audience, with some acts being supported by a backing track provided by the production team. If at any time, the judges find the performance to be unconvincing, boring or completely wrong, they may use the buzzer before them, which changes the Xs from white to red; if all the judges press their buzzers, then the performance is immediately over. However, a judge can retract their buzzer's use if they felt they had done so prematurely before witnessing a contest's performance to the end; this is true if the performance appears to look bad, but later turns out to have been good in their eyes.

Once a performance is over, each judge will give an overview of what they thought about the act, before casting a vote. If the contestant(s) receives a majority vote of "Yes", they then proceed onto the next stage in the contest, otherwise they are eliminated from that series' contest.

All 4 judges and host have a Golden Buzzer, this means the act that impressed them most gets the golden buzzer sending the act(s) straight through to the live semi-finals.

=== Semi-finals ===
Contestants that make it into the semi-finals by making it through the auditions and being chosen by the judges perform once more before an audience and the judges, with their performance broadcast on live television. Like the Audition stage of the contest, each semi-finalist must attempt to impress by primarily conducting a new routine of their act within the same span of time; the judges can still use a buzzer if they are displeased with a performance and can end it early if all the buzzers are used, along with giving a personal opinion about an act when the performance is over. Of the semi-finalists that take part, only two can progress into the final, which is determined by two different types of votes – a public phone vote, and a judges' vote.

The phone vote, which occurs after all the semi-finalists have performed, determines the first winner of the semi-final and takes place via a special phone line over a short break from the programme. During this time, the public votes for the act they liked best, through a phone number in which the final two digits are different for each semi-finalist – these digits are primarily arranged by the order of their appearance. Once the lines have closed and the votes have been counted, the programme airs a live results episode, in which the semi-finalist with the highest number of votes automatically moves into the final. The second winner is determined by the judges' vote, which held after the results of the phone vote have been given out, and determines whether the second or third most popular semi-finalist in the public vote moves on to the final. The judges' vote, held after the result of the phone vote, determines the second act that wins this stage, and is conducted between the second and third most popular acts the public voted on. After the number of judges was increased to four, the rule on the judges' vote was modified – if the vote is tied, the semi-finalist with the second highest tally of public votes automatically moves on to the final.

=== Final ===
For the final of each series, the format of the contest operates in exactly the same manner as the semi-finals, including being broadcast live on television, though this time the winner is determined purely by a phone vote, with the finalists attempting to secure more votes than the others by performing a new routine at their best. Upon the result being given, the top two acts are brought onto the stage, with the hosts announcing which of them received the most votes. The winner of each year's contest will receive a €50,000 cash prize as well as their own primetime Christmas television special.

== Ireland’s Got Mór Talent ==
Glenda Gilson and James Kavanagh present the sister show, Ireland’s Got Mór Talent.

== Series overview ==
Series	Premiere	Finale	Winner's prize	Winner	Runner(s)-up	Presenter	Judges			
1	3 February 2018	24 March 2018	€50,000	RDC	FKFT; Xquisite	Lucy Kennedy	Denise van Outen	Jason Byrne	Michelle Visage	Louis Walsh
2	2 February 2019	7 April 2019	€50,000	BSD	Fly Youth; Rebel Acro	Lucy Kennedy	Denise van Outen	Jason Byrne	Michelle Visage	Louis Walsh

Notes

1. In addition to the cash prize, winners also awarded their own prime time Christmas television special on Virgin Media One, this did not happen. However, this special did air directly before the series 2 finale.

=== Series 1 (2018) ===
In May 2015, Louis Walsh expressed his interest in launching the Irish version of the Got Talent franchise.

The series was announced during a press conference at the National Concert Hall in Dublin on 30 August 2017, with Denise van Outen, Jason Byrne, Michelle Visage and Louis Walsh confirmed as the judges.

The judges auditions were taped at the TLT Concert Hall & Theatre, Drogheda. The semi-finals and final were held at The Helix, Dublin which started on 19 March 2018, continuing at 21 March until the 24th for the final. The judges auditions were taped in November 2017 at the TLT Concert Hall & Theatre, Drogheda. The first series started airing on 3 February 2018. Dance troupe RDC was hailed as the winner, with FKFT and Xquisite, both dance acts, as runners-up.

=== Series 2 (2019) ===
On 27 June 2018, the producers' auditions for second series was announced on the show's website.

All four judges and presenter were reported to return for the second series which began on 2 February 2019.

This was the last series as in July 2019 before the program was cancelled.

== International broadcast ==
- In 2018, the series began airing in the United Kingdom on 5Star.
- In 2020, Ireland's Got Talent Premieres on AXS TV in United States.
