= Would You Believe (TV series) =

Irish religious documentary series

- Starring: Various religious folk
- Country of origin: Ireland

Production
- Running time: 30 minutes

Original release
- Network: RTÉ One

Would You Believe is a religious television series broadcast on Ireland's RTÉ One. Airing each Sunday night at 22:40, it is currently the network's longest-running documentary series.

== Archive ==
This is an incomplete archive of programme titles and broadcast dates.

=== 1990s ===
Transmission date	Title
Unknown date	"Mary McAleese"

=== 2000s ===
2000–2004

2005–2006

Transmission date	Title
22 September 2005	"Slipping Away"
5 October 2005	"Men of Substance"
6 October 2005	"Hunted Down"
12 October 2005	"Crazy Diamond"
14 October 2005	"Dads"
19 October 2005	Diary of a Madman
31 October 2005	"The Calling"
2 November 2005	"Devil's Pack"
4 November 2005	"Walking on Clouds"
11 November 2005	"Iron Will"
17 November 2005	"Mother and Child"
23 November 2005	"Bridging the Gap"
30 November 2005	"Fragile X"
9 December 2005	"Heading Home"

2006–2007

Transmission date	Title
22 September 2006	"Second Chance"
10 October 2006	"Devil In Me"
15 October 2006	"Warhammers"
22 October 2006	"Last Words"
27 October 2006	"Sensor"
5 November 2006	"Finding Azamat"
12 November 2006	"Mums The Word"
17 November 2006	"The Stolen Years"
26 November 2006	"Music In Blood"
10 December 2006	"Pariah"
17 December 2006	"Something About Trish"
11 February 2007	"Faith Healer"
18 February 2007	"Charlie & Mary"
25 February 2007	"The Preacher"
2 March 2007	"Head Strong"
5 March 2007	"Robert Hasten Slowly"
11 March 2007	"Behind Closed Doors"

2007–2008

Transmission date	Title
30 September 2007	"Silent Witness"
7 October 2007	"Phone-a-Friend"
14 October 2007	"Out of the Frying Pan"
21 October 2007	"Love, Law & Ansbacher"
28 October 2007	"Perfect Disorder"
4 November 2007	"Dara"
11 November 2007	"Positively Frank"
18 November 2007	"At Home with Maurice Neligan"
25 November 2007	"Song for My Son"
2 December 2007	"Peter McVerry"
6 December 2007	"And Vespa Makes 5"
16 December 2007	"Felicity's Journey"
24 February 2008	"John O'Donohue"
2 March 2008	"A Fall from Heaven on Earth"
9 March 2008	"Bullied"
16 March 2008	"Leading Lady"
30 March 2008	"Food for Thought"
3 April 2008	"Sleeping with the Enemy"
2 September 2008	"Looking For a Miracle" (Special)

2008–2009

2009–2010

Fair City actor Tommy O'Neill discussed his life on 14 March 2010 episode.

All programmes from oldest to most recent online to celebrate 60 years of television Christmas 2021.
