= The Tommy Tiernan Show =

Irish television talk show

- Genre: Chat show
- Presented by: Tommy Tiernan
- Starring: Fred Cooke (announcer)
- Country of origin: Ireland
- Original language: English
- No. of series: 9
- No. of episodes: 82 and counting

Production
- Production locations: Studio 4, RTÉ Television Centre, Donnybrook, Dublin 4, Ireland
- Running time: Approx. 60 minutes

Original release
- Network: RTÉ One
- Release: 5 January 2017 – present

The Tommy Tiernan Show is an Irish chat show presented by Tommy Tiernan. It was first broadcast on RTÉ One on 5 January 2017. The first two series aired on Thursday evenings, with the third series moving to a Saturday evening slot. The premise of the show is that host Tommy Tiernan and the audience don't know who the guests will be.

== Episodes ==
The first four series of the show were filmed in front of a studio audience. Due to the COVID-19 pandemic, Series 5 and 6 were recorded without an audience. The studio audience was reintroduced for Series 7, but the show returned to a no-audience format for Series 8 onwards.

Series	Episodes	Originally released	
Series	Episodes	First released	Last released
1	6	5 January 2017	9 February 2017
2	6	3 January 2018	7 February 2018
3	8	4 May 2019	29 June 2019
4	10	2020	2020
5	10	2021	2021
6	13	(special: 27 December 2021); 8 January 2022	26 March 2022
7	12	8 January 2023	25 March 2023
8	16	6 January 2024	20 April 2024
9	16	4 January 2025	19 April 2025

=== Series 1 (2017) ===
No. in series	Guests	Original release date
1	Christy Dignam, Vogue Williams and Russell Howard with music from Aslan.	5 January 2017
2	Ray D'Arcy, The Crimmins triplets and Richard Baneham with music from Gavin James.	12 January 2017
3	Musicians John Sheahan and Paddy Moloney, Professor Brendan Kelly and Lisa McHugh who also performed music for the episode.	19 January 2017
4	Activist and actor John Connors, Irish football legend John Aldridge and author Lisa McInerney with music from The Riptide Movement.	26 January 2017
5	Legendary jockey Sir AP McCoy, author Louise O'Neill, and GAA player Briege Corkery, with music from Lynched	2 February 2017
6	Irish comedian Joanne McNally, musician John Grant, GAA player Philly McMahon, and musical act Booka Brass Band.	9 February 2017

=== Series 2 (2018) ===
No. in series	Guests	Original release date
1	Fionnula Flanagan, Shaykh Umar Al-Qadri and Foster and Allen. Music from Áine Cahill	3 January 2018
2	Michael Healy Rae, Emily Power Smith, and Michael Harding, with music from Loah and the RTÉ Concert Orchestra	10 January 2018
3	Sharon Horgan, Senator Lynn Ruane and Donncha O'Callaghan.	17 January 2018
4	Ruby Wax, Martin Hayes and Dr. Niamh Shaw. Music by Martin Hayes and Dennis Cahill.	24 January 2018
5	Imelda May, Blindboy Boatclub, and Nigel Owens, with music from the Waterboys.	31 January 2018
6	Rosemary Smith, Damien Dempsey, Fiona Ni Fhlaithearta, Caitlín Nic Aoidh and Irial Ó Ceallaigh.	7 February 2018

=== Series 3 (2019) ===
No. in series	Guests	Original release date
1	Football legend Paul McGrath, Autism awareness campaigner Ciara-Beth Ní Griffin, and Offaly golfing sensation Shane Lowry. Music was by Zoë Conway, Máirtín O'Connor and Dónal Lunny.	4 May 2019
2	Musician Adam Clayton, economist David McWilliams and actress Eileen Walsh. Music was by SOAK.	11 May 2019
3	Stand-up comedian Eddie Izzard, Irish amateur boxer Kellie Harrington and Irish author and storyteller Eddie Lenihan. Music was by Wallis Bird and the Line Up Choir.	25 May 2019
4	Gaelic games commentator Mícheál Ó Muircheartaigh, Life and Relationship Coach, Gráinne Carr and Irish television presenter and broadcaster Angela Scanlon. Music by Villagers with the RTÉ Concert Orchestra	1 June 2019
5	Irish actor Barry Keoghan, Kellie Maloney and daughter, Sophie Maloney, and Irish actor Emmet Kirwan. Music was by Mick Pyro.	8 June 2019
6	Fr. Brian D'Arcy, Irish singer-songwriters Sallay and Emma Garnett, and Dundalk tattooist, Baz Black. Music was by Junior Brother.	15 June 2019
7	Comedian and actor, Jon Kenny, international motivational speaker, explorer, and author, Mark Pollock and Simone George, and Professor Aoife McLysaght. Music was by Chvrches	22 June 2019
8	Irish singer-songwriter, actor, radio and television presenter Keith Duffy, Somali-Irish social activist Ifrah Ahmed and Irish Poet Paul Muldoon. Music was by American musical group Tank and the Bangas.	29 June 2019

=== Series 4 (2020) ===
10 episodes

- Hozier, Mark Smith, Aisling Byrne and Paddy Holohan
- Brendan O'Carroll, Elizabeth Oakes, and Donna Zuma

=== Series 5 (2021) ===
16 episodes

- Andrea Corr, Nicola Tallant and Darragh Carroll. Music was by Andrea Corr with the RTÉ Concert Orchestra.
- Sinéad Burke, Ian Robertson and Deirdre Robertson, Séamus and Breanndán Begly. Music was by Emma Langford.
- Brenda Fricker, Bashir Otukoya, and Senator David Norris.
- Mary Coughlan, Zak Moradi, and Senator Eileen Flynn.
- Baz Ashmawy, Jess Kavanagh, and Manchán Magan. Music was by Pillow Queens.
- Brian O'Driscoll, Stephen Rea and Judge Gillian Hussey. Music was by AE Mak.
- Dublin Zoo's Gerry Creighton, Dave Balfe/For Those I Love.
- Philomena Begley, Helen Behan, Chris "Big Bear" McNaghten. Music was by Muireann Nic Amhlaoibh, Gerry O'Beirne and Dónal O'Connor.
- Liam Cunningham, The 2 Johnnies, and Mary Reynolds. Music was by Daoirí Farrell and Dónal Lunny.
- Seán Boylan, Fionnghuala O'Reilly, and David Brophy.
- Joe Slattery, Eamon Dunphy, Lisa O'Neill, FeliSpeaks and Tolü Makay.
- Sinead Kane, Neven Maguire, and Mike Scott. Music by David O'Doherty and his father Jim Doherty.
- Rita Ann Higgins, Ardal O'Hanlon and Ciarán Bolger. Music was by Pugwash.

=== Series 6 (2022) ===
- A special episode aired on 27 December 2021
- Marie Cassidy, Killian Donnelly and Barry McGuigan.
- Gabriel Byrne, Davy FitzGerald, Santis O'Garro

=== Series 7 (2023) ===
- Roy Keane, football analyst, and former international player
- Martin Shaw, storyteller and collector of myths
- Roz Purcell, model and influencer
- Donovan, singer-songwriter
- Ken Doherty, former world champion snooker player
- Dara Ó Briain, stand-up comedian
- Rebecca Tallon de Havilland, transgender activist

=== Series 8 (2024) ===
No. in series	Guests	Original release date
1	Dylan Moran, Sarah De Lagarde, Sean Ronayne, MC Fred Cooke with music from Huun Huur Tu	6 January 2024
2	Empowerment coach and former international dominatrix Miss Erica Storm, comedian David McSavage and Dancing With The Stars judge Arthur Gourounlian. With music from The Blades.	13 January 2024
3	TV presenter, actor and singer Bradley Walsh, opera singer Celine Byrne and inner city GP Dr. Austin O’Carroll. With music from The Breath.	20 January 2024
4	Author Jono Lancaster, former professional footballer and manager Roddy Collins and historians and creators of The Bad Bridget project, Elaine Farrell and Lianne McCormick. With music from Rachael Lavelle.	27 January 2024
5	Former professional footballer Paul Merson, musicians Liam Ó Maonlaí & Fiachna Ó Braonáin and psychotherapist and celebrant Karen Dempsey. With music from Mick Flannery.	3 February 2024
6	Nurse & HIV+ advocate Aoife Commins, comedian, broadcaster & author Dermot Whelan and singer/songwriter & record producer Róisín Murphy.	10 February 2024
7	Author Gerry Kelly, actress Siobhán McSweeney and stone lifter David Keohan with music from Eoghan Ó Ceannabháin.	17 February 2024
8	Nessa Hurley & Anne O'Connell, American engineer and retired NASA astronaut Dan Tani and author and Booker prize winner Paul Lynch. Music is from The Last Dinner Party.	17 February 2024
9	Charles Hendy, Andrew Hendy & Sean McKenna, better known as The Mary Wallopers, sexual assault survivor Sarah Grace and film producer and educator Lord David Puttnam. With music from The Yankari Afrobeat Collective.	2 March 2024
10	Comedian John Bishop, Capuchin Franciscan priest-friar Brother Richard and dancer and community activist Edwina Guckian. Music is from NewDad.	9 March 2024
11	Kerry sporting legend Kieran Donaghy, language rights activist Linda Ervine and poet, writer, spoken-word artist & pharmacist Dagogo Hart. Music is from The Workshop.	16 March 2024
12	Ultra endurance runner & Irish paralympian Peter Ryan, poet John Cooper Clarke and musician & psychologist Louize Carroll. Music is from Susan O'Neill.	23 March 2024
13	Singer/songwriter Guy Garvey, death doula & psychotherapist Laura Coleman and folklorist, author & documentary maker Manchán Magan. Music is from Guy Garvey & Mark Potter from Elbow.	30 March 2024
14	Former international goalkeeper & broadcaster Shay Given, comedian Deirdre O’Kane and artist Bernard Canavan. Music is from SÍOMHA with the RTÉ Concert Orchestra.	6 April 2024
15	Snooker player Stephen Hendry, professor of psychiatry Brendan Kelly and poet Paula Meehan. Music is from Roisin El Cherif.	13 April 2024
16	Comedian, actor & writer Roisin Conaty, musician Mik Pyro and Irish weightlifter Thammy Nguyen.	20 April 2024

=== Series 9 (2025) ===
No. in series	Guests	Original release date
1	Musician Pete Doherty, writer Irvine Welsh, and journalist Aedín Ní Thiarnaigh.	4 January 2025
2	David Gray, Bernard Phelan, and The Wild Geeze.	11 January 2025
3	Emer Halpenny and Brian Daly, George Hamilton, and Lisa O'Neill.	18 January 2025
4	Fern Brady, Seamus O'Rourke, and Dr Lollie Mancey, with music from A Lazarus Soul with Steve Wickham.	25 January 2025
5	Paul Giamatti, Emma Doran, and Doireann Ní Ghlacáin, with music by Mohammad Syfkhan.	1 February 2025
6	Jimmy Carr, Aaron Sunderland Carey, and Cait O'Riordan.	8 February 2025
7	Lemn Sissay, Mairéad Ní Mhaonaigh, and brothers John and Cian Adams, with music from Chubby Cat.	15 February 2025
8	Comedian Eddie Izzard, dentist and activist Dr Manizha Khan, and Michael Mulcahy, with music from Sam Amidon.	22 February 2025
9	Boxer Chris Eubank, playwright Enda Walsh, and writer Elizabeth Zion.	1 March 2025
10	Dame Kelly Holmes, Oran Finegan, and Mat Fraser, with music by Niamh Bury.	8 March 2025
11	Comedian and broadcaster Paddy McGuinness, academic and broadcaster Aoibhinn Ní Shúilleabháin, and musician God Knows.	15 March 2025
12	Musician Gavin Friday; cultural historian Dr Siobhán Doyle; and comedians Shane Daniel Byrne, Tony Cantwell, and Killian Sundermann.	22 March 2025
13	Martin O'Neill, physicist Jocelyn Bell Burnell, and Marti Pellow, with music by Glasshouse.	29 March 2025
14	Leo Moran and Davy Carton from The Saw Doctors, Kyla Cobbler, and composer Bill Whelan.	5 April 2025
15	Charlotte Church, Davy Russell, and Oein DeBhairduin, with music from Cardinals.	12 April 2025
16	Damian Lewis, Tríona Ní Dhomhnaill and Maighread Ní Dhomhnaill, and Clive Anderson.	19 April 2025

== Cultural impact ==
- The House, a song from the 2023 album Hit Parade by Róisín Murphy, samples Murphy and Tiernan's conversation on the show
