= Jason Byrne (comedian) =

Irish comedian (born 1972)

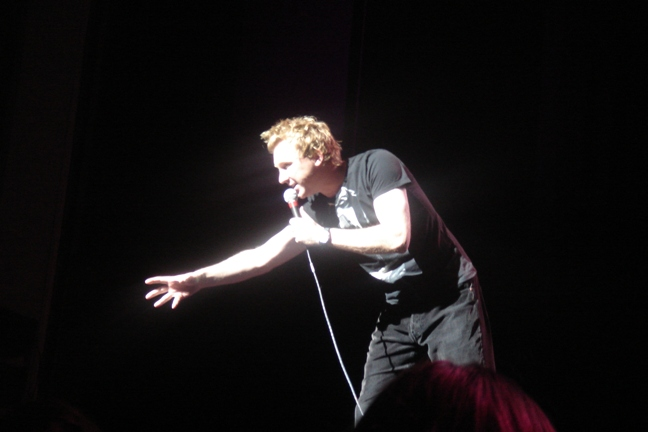
- Byrne performing in So You Think You're Funny in 2008
- Born: 25 February 1972 (age 54); Dublin, Ireland
- Notable work: Father Ted; Live at the Apollo; Alice in Wonderland
- Spouse: Brenda Byrne (m. 2004; div. 2018)
- Children: 2

Comedy career
- Years active: 1995–present
- Medium: Television, stand-up
- Genres: Observational comedy, surreal humour, insult comedy
- Website: Official website

Jason Byrne (born 25 February 1972) is an Irish stand-up comedian.

In August 2008, he made his twelfth Edinburgh Festival Fringe appearance. Byrne previously presented a mid-morning radio show on Phantom FM as well as a comedy chat show The Jason Byrne Show featuring P. J. Gallagher, and a comedy panel show called The Byrne Ultimatum on RTÉ Two. He created and starred in a radio show also called The Jason Byrne Show from 2010 to 2012 on BBC Radio 2. The second series was awarded a Gold Sony Radio Award for Best Comedy.

In 2018, he published The Accidental Adventures of Onion O'Brien, a series of books about a young boy growing up in Ireland who has constant bad luck. The book is based on Byrne's childhood.

== Personal life ==
Byrne was born on 25 February 1972 in Dublin, in the suburb of Ballinteer. Byrne was married to Brenda from 2004 until 2018 and has two children.

== Awards and nominations ==
- Finalist in So You Think You're Funny in 1996
- Nominated for the Perrier Best Newcomer Award in 1998
- Nominated for the Perrier Award in 2001 for his show entitled "Jason Byrne".
- Forth One Fringe Award in 2004 at the Edinburgh Festival Fringe

== Stand-up shows ==
- 2001 – Jason Byrne (Perrier Nominee)
- 2003 – Jason Byrne Hates...
- 2003 – Jason Byrne
- 2004 – Jason Byrne: That's Not a Badger
- 2005 – The Lovely Goat Show
- 2006 – Sheep for Feet and Rams for Hands
- 2007 – Afterhours
- 2008 – Cats Under Mats, Having Chats with Bats
- 2009 – The Byrne Supremacy
- 2010 – Jason Byrne 2010
- 2011 – Cirque Du Byrne
- 2021 - Edinburgh fringe where he was joined by Antonio Falzarano on stage.

== Filmography ==
=== Television ===
- 35 Aside (Football Hooligan) (1996)
- Father Ted (Referee) (1998)
- Comedy Lab (Jason Byrne Is Twiggy No Branch) (1999)
- Dark Ages (Arland) (1999)
- The Jason Byrne Show (2002)
- Separation Anxiety (Waiter) (2002)
- Paddy Muck (2005)
- Emily's Song (Robert) (2006)
- Comedy Cuts (2007)
- Anonymous (2007–2010)
- Dick and Dom's Funny Business (Special Guest) (2011)
- The Comedy Annual (2011)
- Melbourne Comedy Festival Great Debate 2011 (2011)
- Live at the Apollo (Series 7, Episode 1) (2011)
- The Matt Lucas Awards (2013)
- Father Figure (2013)
- Alan Davies: As Yet Untitled (Series 1, Episode 2) (2014)
- Wild Things (Presenter) (2015)
- Don't Say It... Bring It! (Host) (2017)
- Ireland's Got Talent (Judge) (2018–2019)
- Show Me the Movie! (2018)
- Hughesy, We Have a Problem (2018)

=== Film ===
- I Went Down (Cork Man No. 2) (1997)
- The General (Reporter 2) (1998)
- Alice in Wonderland (Pat the Gardener) (1999)
- Killing Bono (Hotel Receptionist) (2011)

=== Radio ===
- The Jason Byrne Show (2010–2012)

=== Stand-up DVDs ===
- Out of the Box (20 November 2006)
- Live – Cirque Du Byrne (19 November 2012)
