= List of Irish Independent Albums Chart number ones of 2024 =

This is a list of albums that reached number-one on the Irish Independent Albums Chart in 2024. The charts were compiled by Irish Recorded Music Association (IRMA).

== Chart history ==
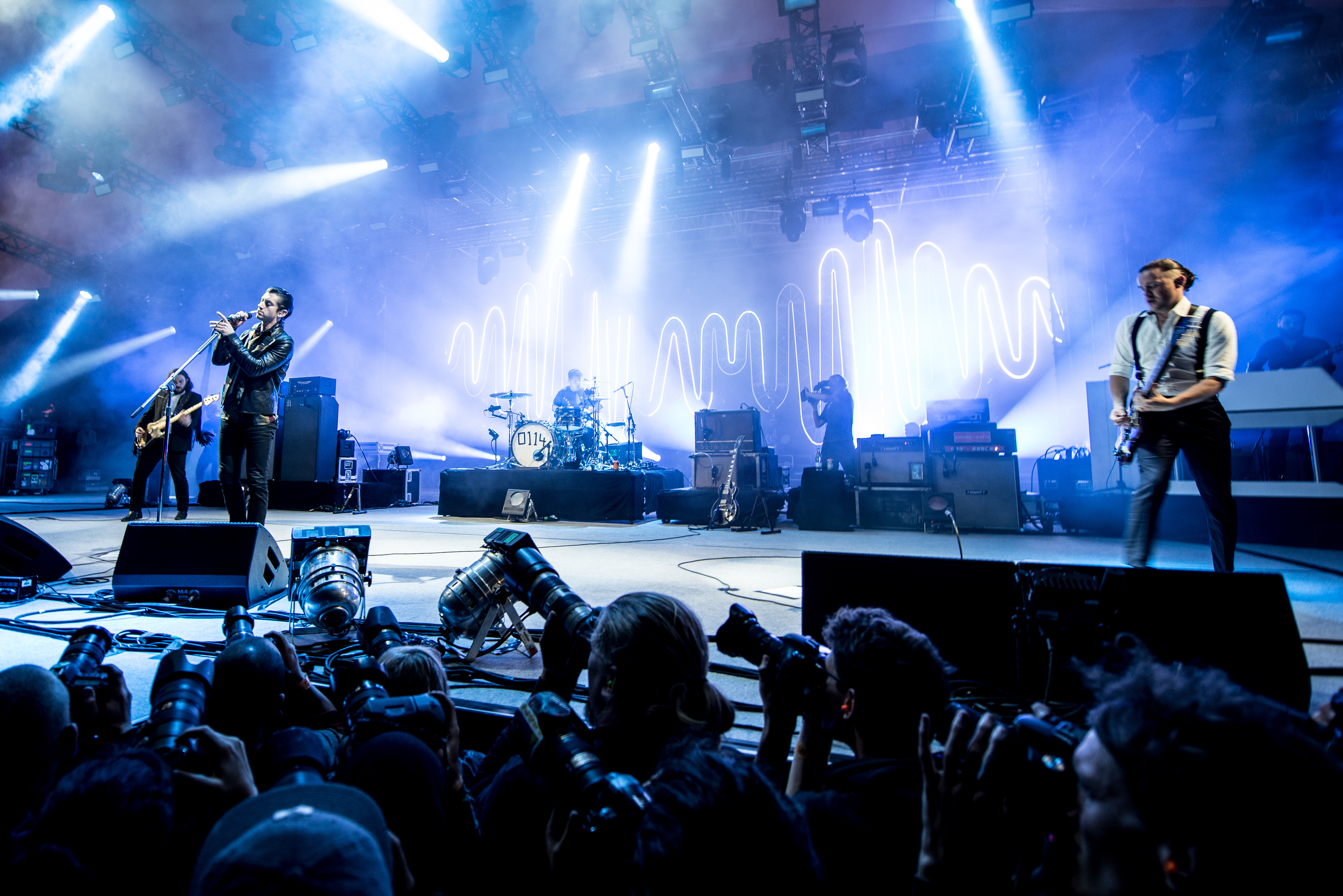
Arctic Monkeys Spent Fourteen weeks at number one this year with AM

List of Irish Independent Albums Chart number-one albums of 2024
Issue date	Album	Artist(s)	Label	Ref
5 January	AM	Arctic Monkeys	Domino	
12 January	Letter to Self	Sprints	City Slang	
19 January	AM	Arctic Monkeys	Domino	
26 January	AM	Arctic Monkeys	Domino	
2 February	Wall of Eyes	The Smile	XL	
9 February	AM	Arctic Monkeys	Domino	
16 February	Vultures 1	Kanye West and Ty Dolla Sign	YZY	
23 February	Vultures 1	Kanye West and Ty Dolla Sign	YZY	
1 March	Vultures 1	Kanye West and Ty Dolla Sign	YZY	
8 March	Vultures 1	Kanye West and Ty Dolla Sign	YZY	
15 March	Vultures 1	Kanye West and Ty Dolla Sign	YZY	
22 March	Doghouse	Travis and Elzzz	Just Ents	
29 March	AM	Arctic Monkeys	Domino	
5 April	AM	Arctic Monkeys	Domino	
12 April	AM	Arctic Monkeys	Domino	
19 April	Lyra	Lyra	Rubyworks	
26 April	Lyra	Lyra	Rubyworks	
3 May	AM	Arctic Monkeys	Domino	
10 May	AM	Arctic Monkeys	Domino	
17 May	That Golden Time	Villagers	Domino	
24 May	AM	Arctic Monkeys	Domino	
31 May	AM	Arctic Monkeys	Domino	
7 June	Small Town Heroes	The 2 Johnnies	Reckless	
14 June	Small Town Heroes	The 2 Johnnies	Reckless	
21 June	Fine Art	Kneecap	Heavenly	
28 June	Fine Art	Kneecap	Heavenly	
5 July	AM	Arctic Monkeys	Domino	
12 July	No Flowers Grow in Cement Gardens	A Lazarus Soul	Bohemia	
19 July	AM	Arctic Monkeys	Domino	
26 July	Live From Dublin	Kingfishr	B-Unique	
2 August	AM	Arctic Monkeys	Domino	
9 August	Vultures 2	Kanye West and Ty Dolla Sign	YZY	
16 August	Live From Phil Grimes	Dave Lofts	Henhouse	
23 August	Satellites	The Script	BMG	
30 August	Romance	Fontaines D.C.	XL	
6 September	Romance	Fontaines D.C.	XL	
13 September	Romance	Fontaines D.C.	XL	
20 September	Romance	Fontaines D.C.	XL	
27 September	Now in a Minute	Susan O'Neill	Son Star House Collective	
4 October	Thoughts & Observation	The Coronas	So Far So	
11 October	Everybody Needs a Hero	Orla Gartland	New Friends	
18 October	Romance	Fontaines D.C.	XL	
25 October	Tension II	Kylie Minogue	BMG	
1 November	Romance	Fontaines D.C.	XL	
8 November	Redesign	Ryan McMullan	Napoleon	
15 November	Romance	Fontaines D.C.	XL	
22 November	Dreaming of Daniel	Jerry Fish	Electric Sideshow	
29 November	Romance	Fontaines D.C.	XL	
6 December	Romance	Fontaines D.C.	XL	
13 December	Romance	Fontaines D.C.	XL	
20 December	Romance	Fontaines D.C.	XL	
27 December	Romance	Fontaines D.C.	XL	

== See also ==
- List of number-one albums of 2024 (Ireland)
- List of number-one singles of 2024 (Ireland)
