= List of number-one albums of 2024 (Ireland) =

The Irish Albums Chart ranks the best-performing albums in Ireland, as compiled by the Official Charts Company on behalf of the Irish Recorded Music Association.

== Chart history ==
Issue date	Album	Artist	Reference
5 January	Stick Season	Noah Kahan	
12 January	Stick Season	Noah Kahan	
19 January	Stick Season	Noah Kahan	
26 January	Stick Season	Noah Kahan	
2 February	Stick Season	Noah Kahan	
9 February	Stick Season	Noah Kahan	
16 February	Stick Season	Noah Kahan	
23 February	Stick Season	Noah Kahan	
1 March	Stick Season	Noah Kahan	
8 March	Liam Gallagher John Squire	Liam Gallagher and John Squire	
15 March	Eternal Sunshine	Ariana Grande	
22 March	Doghouse	Travis and Elzzz	
29 March	Guts	Olivia Rodrigo	
5 April	Cowboy Carter	Beyoncé	
12 April	Cowboy Carter	Beyoncé	
19 April	Lyra	Lyra	
26 April	The Tortured Poets Department	Taylor Swift	
3 May	The Tortured Poets Department	Taylor Swift	
10 May	The Tortured Poets Department	Taylor Swift	
17 May	The Tortured Poets Department	Taylor Swift	
24 May	Hit Me Hard and Soft	Billie Eilish	
31 May	Hit Me Hard and Soft	Billie Eilish	
7 June	Small Town Heroes	The 2 Johnnies	
14 June	Hit Me Hard and Soft	Billie Eilish	
21 June	The Tortured Poets Department	Taylor Swift	
28 June	The Tortured Poets Department	Taylor Swift	
5 July	The Tortured Poets Department	Taylor Swift	
12 July	The Tortured Poets Department	Taylor Swift	
19 July	The Death of Slim Shady (Coup de Grâce)	Eminem	
26 July	The Tortured Poets Department	Taylor Swift	
2 August	The Rise and Fall of a Midwest Princess	Chappell Roan	
9 August	The Rise and Fall of a Midwest Princess	Chappell Roan	
16 August	Stick Season	Noah Kahan	
23 August	Satellites	The Script	
30 August	Short n' Sweet	Sabrina Carpenter	
6 September	Short n' Sweet	Sabrina Carpenter	
13 September	Short n' Sweet	Sabrina Carpenter	
20 September	Short n' Sweet	Sabrina Carpenter	
27 September	Short n' Sweet	Sabrina Carpenter	
4 October	Thoughts & Observations	The Coronas	
11 October	Moon Music	Coldplay	
18 October	Brat	Charli XCX	
25 October	Short n' Sweet	Sabrina Carpenter	
1 November	Chromakopia	Tyler, the Creator	
8 November	A Terrible Beauty	Christy Moore	
15 November	Short n' Sweet	Sabrina Carpenter	
22 November	Short n' Sweet	Sabrina Carpenter	
29 November	GNX	Kendrick Lamar	
6 December	Short n' Sweet	Sabrina Carpenter	
13 December	The Tortured Poets Department	Taylor Swift	
20 December	Short n' Sweet	Sabrina Carpenter	
27 December	Christmas	Michael Bublé	

== Number-one artists ==
Position	Artist	Weeks at No. 1
1	Noah Kahan	10
1	Taylor Swift	10
1	Sabrina Carpenter	10
4	Billie Eilish	3
5	Beyoncé	2
5	Chappell Roan	2
7	Liam Gallagher	1
7	John Squire	1
7	Ariana Grande	1
7	Travis and Elzzz	1
7	Olivia Rodrigo	1
7	Lyra	1
7	The 2 Johnnies	1
7	Eminem	1
7	The Script	1
7	The Coronas	1
7	Coldplay	1
7	Charli XCX	1
7	Tyler, the Creator	1
7	Christy Moore	1
7	Kendrick Lamar	1
7	Michael Bublé	1

== See also ==
- List of number-one singles of 2024 (Ireland)
