= MEO Arena =

Multipurpose indoor arena in Lisbon, Portugal

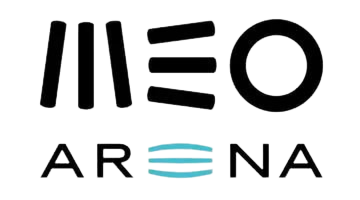

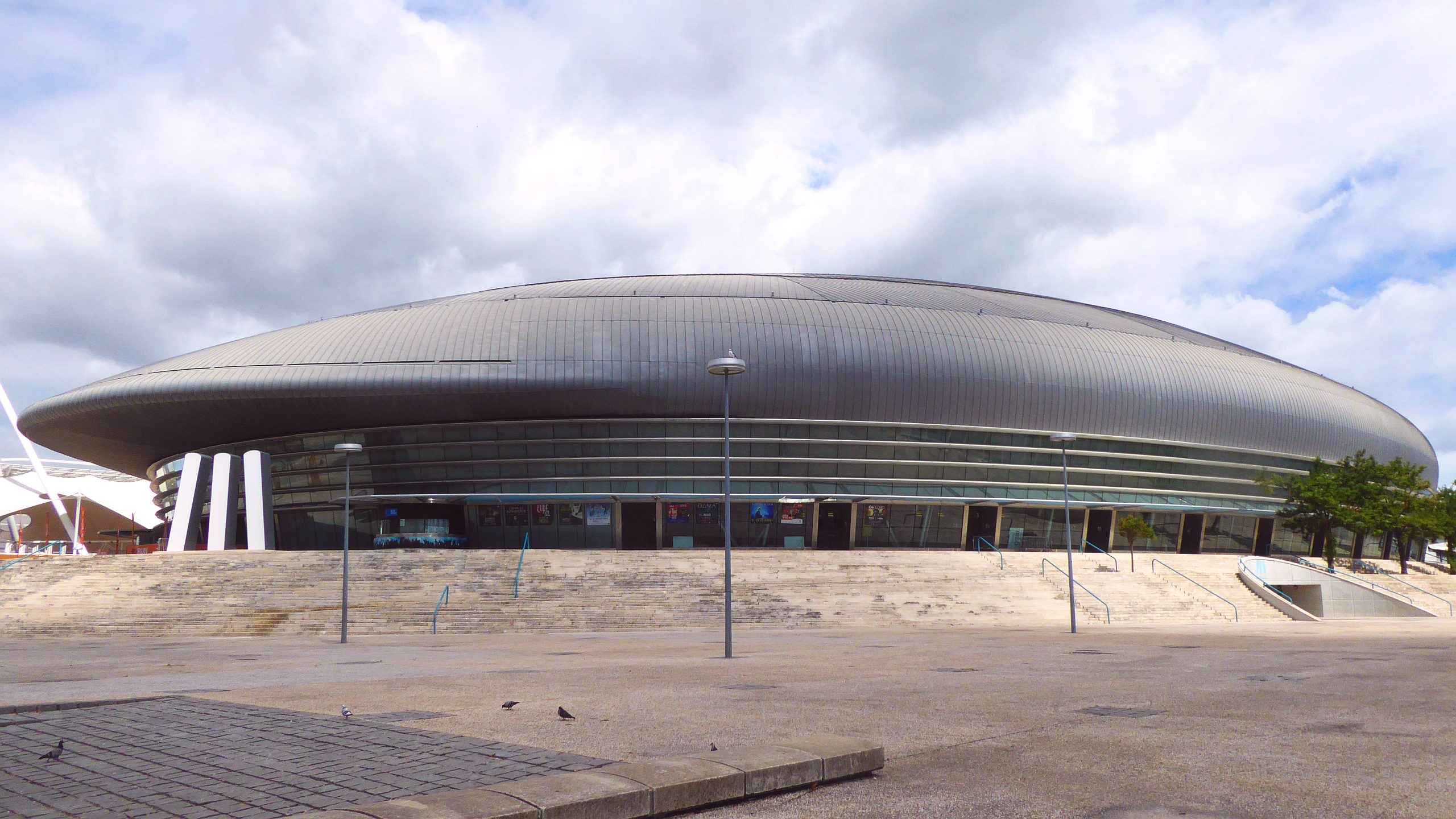
- View of the arena (2016)
- Interactive map of MEO Arena
- Former names: Pavilhão da Utopia (1998); Pavilhão Atlântico (1998–2013); MEO Arena (2013–2017); Altice Arena (2017–2024)
- Address: Lisbon; Portugal
- Location: Rossio dos Olivais, 1990-231 Lisbon, Portugal
- Coordinates: 38°46′7″N 9°5′38″W
- Owner: Live Nation Entertainment, Inc.
- Operator: Live Nation Entertainment, Inc.
- Capacity: 20,100 (concerts); 15,000 (futsal)
- Public transit: Gare do Oriente; Vermelha at Oriente

Construction
- Built: 1996–1998
- Opened: 1998
- Cost: €55 million
- Architect: Regino Cruz
- Main contractor: Skidmore, Owings & Merrill

Website
- arena.meo.pt

MEO Arena (formerly Altice Arena; also referred to by its former name, Pavilhão Atlântico) is a multi-purpose indoor arena in Lisbon, Portugal. The arena is among the largest indoor arenas in Europe and the largest in Portugal with a capacity of 20,000 people and was built in 1998 for Expo '98.

== History ==
Plans to build a multipurpose arena in Lisbon date back to the first discussions of the Expo '98 Master Plan. At the time, the city lacked a versatile facility able to accommodate concerts, congresses and sporting events of big scope. The existing structures, both in Lisbon and in Portugal alike, either had limited capacity (up to 4,000 people), or were difficult to adapt to non-conventional events, such as world class indoor sports competitions. Another shortcoming of existing venues was the lack of technical infrastructure deemed necessary to host modern concerts, musicals and to allow for proper live TV coverage.

The country needed an arena to fill the existing gap between smaller indoor halls, like the Lisbon Coliseum, and open-air stadia. As a consequence, Portugal would not host games of important indoor sports championships and no major concerts would take place in the country in periods of cold and rainy weather.

The decision to build the Pavilhão Atlântico within the masterplan of Expo '98 allowed the arena to have a catchment area well beyond the city of Lisbon. Being a short distance from Gare do Oriente and several major highway interchanges, allows the arena to draw spectators from all over the country.

In July 2012, the arena was sold to Arena Atlântico S.A. for €21,2 million. In May 2013, Portugal Telecom acquired the naming rights to the venue, re-branding it as "MEO Arena" after its services brand MEO. In October 2017, following the acquisition of Portugal Telecom by Altice, the venue was renamed "Altice Arena". In February 2024, Altice Arena reverted to its previous name MEO Arena.

== Architecture ==
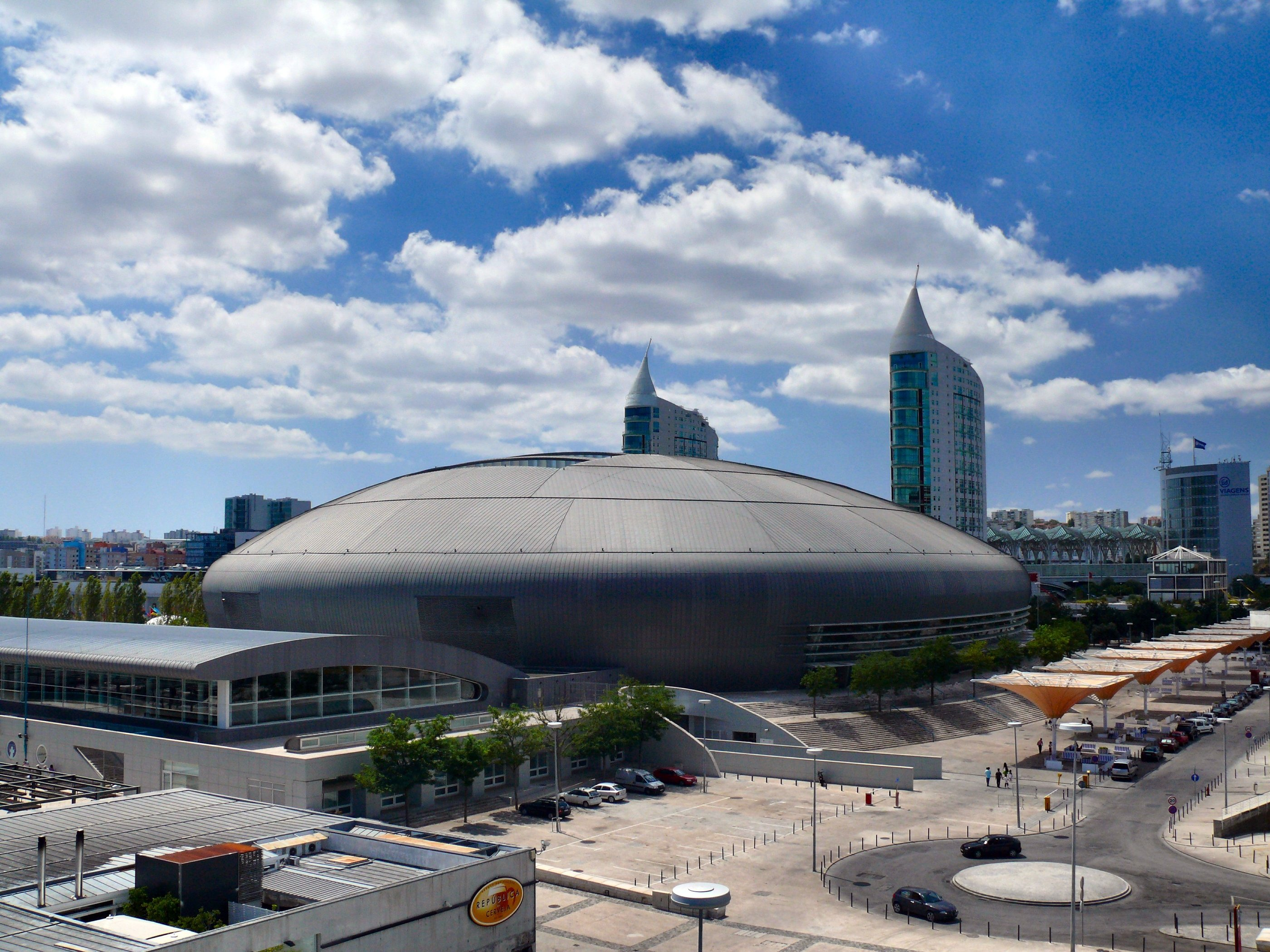
The Atlantic Hall (Pavilhao Atlantico) in Lisbon, 2008

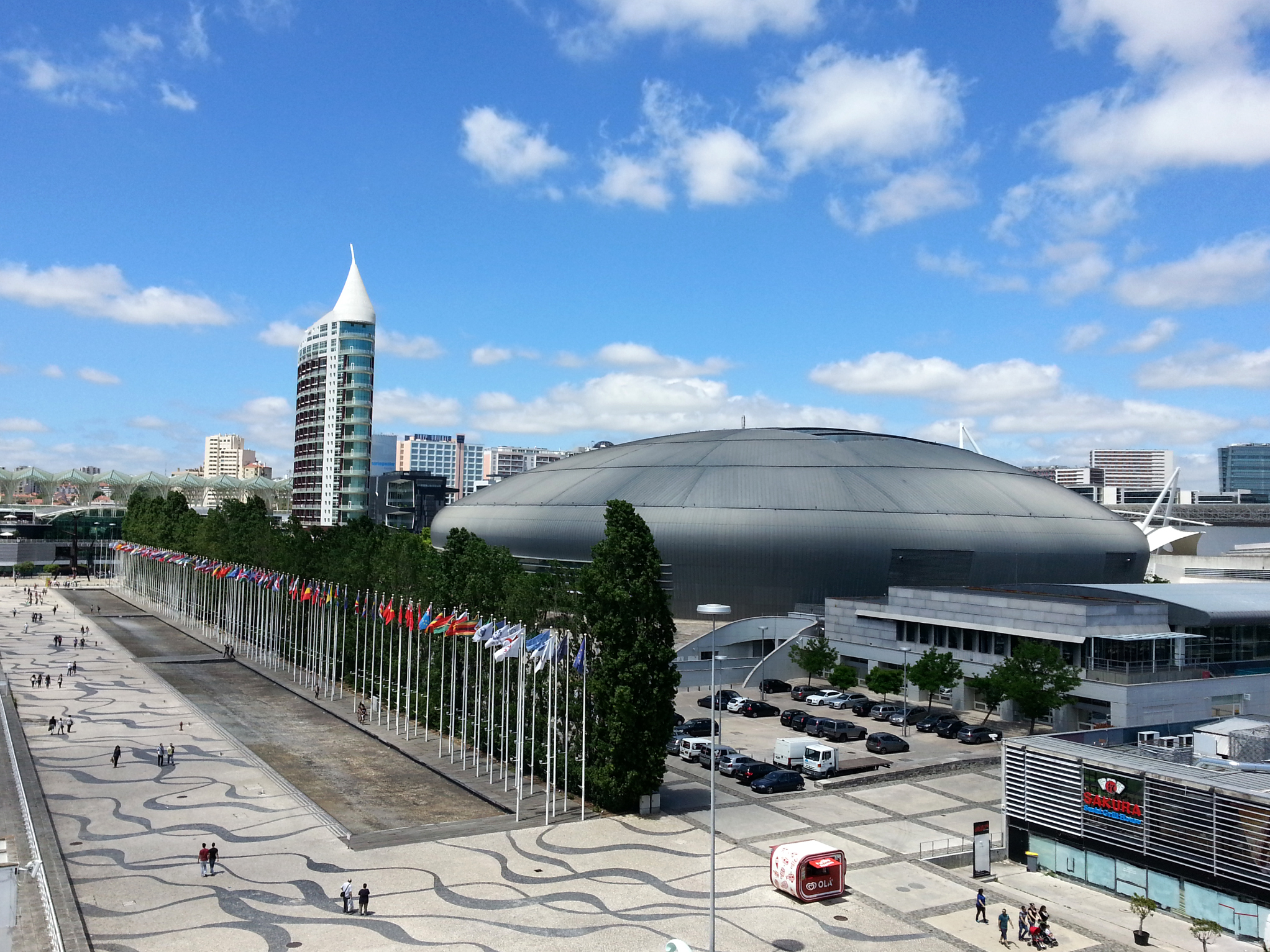
South-side view of the arena (2015)

The building was designed by Portuguese architect Regino Cruz, who is the author of several government and office buildings in Brazil and in Portugal, in association with Skidmore, Owings & Merrill (SOM). SOM has been awarded first prize in the contests for the Olympic stadiums of Manchester and Berlin, and is responsible for designing many big sporting pavilions in the US (Portland, Philadelphia, Oakland and Minneapolis). The studio is also a co-designer of the Vasco da Gama Tower, located at the northern end of the Parque das Nações in Lisbon. The shape of the Altice Arena is reminiscent of a large flying-saucer, a sea turtle's shell or a horseshoe crab. Such a unique shape demanded out-of-the box thinking for its underpinnings, both for structural and symbolic reasons. The roof, for example, sits atop a wood grid, designed in the shape of a carrack. Being part of a world expo celebrating the world's oceans and 15th-century Portuguese discoveries, wood was considered more fitting than either concrete or steel.

The main goals of the design were: 1) Minimise the visual impact generated from such a big structure; 2) rational energy use; and 3) simplify the flow of spectators in and out of the building.

The main façade is oriented towards the south, which increases sun exposure during the colder winter months, at the same time preventing direct sunlight in the summer months. This exposure allows the reduction of heating and air conditioning costs, while at the same time natural ventilation outlets on top of the building provide air circulation and cooling. By placing the main floor 6.4 metres below ground level the architects allowed for a generously high roof, while at the same time reducing the external footprint and minimizing heat exchange (as a result of the smaller surface area exposed to the weather). The external glass façade is shaded by overhanging panels, designed to allow sunlight only during winter months. A system of external moving blinds further allows natural lighting to enter the pavilion.

Accessibility is also straightforward by means of a short stadium-seating-like external staircase that surrounds the entire building.

== Expo '98 ==
During Expo '98, the building was called the Pavilion of Utopia and housed the spectacle "Oceans and Utopias".

The Expo '98 theme was "Knowledge of the Seas or of the Future", and while other expositions approached the "ocean" themes from artistic, scientific or historical perspective, at the Utopian Pavilion, the designers took a symbolic, dreamlike, and/or magical approach to the exhibits. As such, during the 132 days of the exposition, the Pavilion was an open space to showcase works of imagination, reflecting the fears, myths and legends that throughout history, have been associated with the World's oceans. Visitors were awarded with sights of Daedalus, Greek Gods, mythical heroes such as Hercules, as well as colorful displays portraying the birth of mankind and gods, the Big Bang, the Deluge, Atlantis, the Age of Discovery and space travel, just to name a few. Written by François I. Confine and Philippe Genty, and produced by Rozon, the show (which was presented four times a day) mixed classic theatrical elements and modern multimedia technology.

== Events ==
=== Sporting events ===
The arena was also the final venue of the 1999 FIBA Under-19 World Championship, between USA and Spain. The 2001 IAAF World Indoor Championships, the 2002 World Fencing Championships and the 2000 ATP Finals also took place there.

Croatia men's national handball team became world champion for the first time there, after beating Germany at the 2003 World Men's Handball Championship Final.

The arena holds the European record for attendance in club Futsal when 10,076 spectators saw Sporting losing to FC Barcelona (3x5) in the 2014–15 UEFA Futsal Cup final-four.

=== Web Summit ===
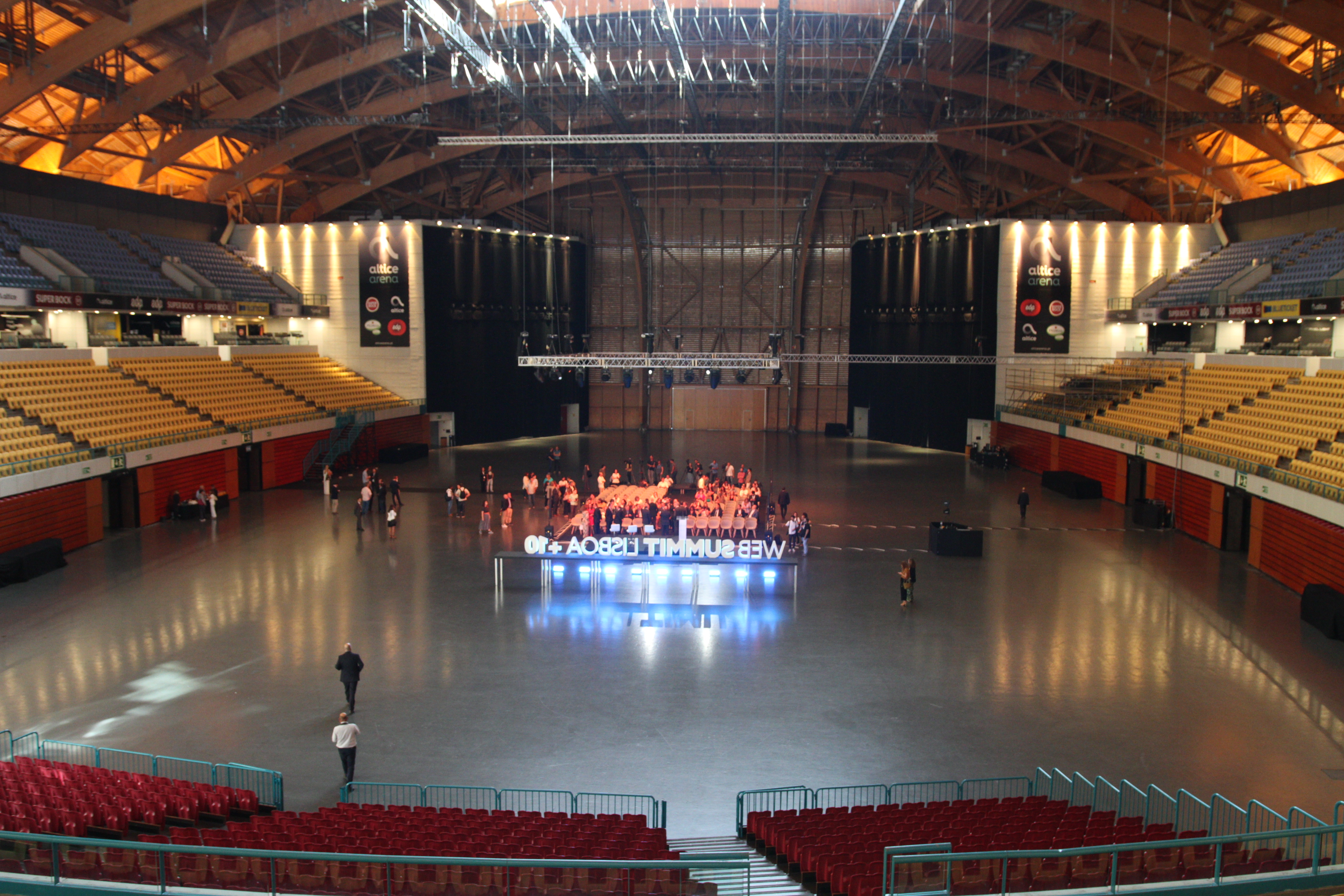
Arena hosting Web Summit 2018

In September 2015, Web Summit co-founder and CEO Paddy Cosgrave announced that the event would be held in Lisbon for three consecutive editions, from 2016 to 2018. Congrave cited the local startup scene and a "cosmopolitan city with better infrastructure conditions and a larger number of hotel rooms" for the decision.

The three-day event held from 7 to 10 November at the MEO Arena, site of Expo '98, drew 53,056 attendees from more than 150 countries and more than 1,500 start-ups spread over 21 venues. Among the more than 600 speakers were a number of tech top executives from around the world, including John Chambers of Cisco Systems, Facebook CTO Mike Schroepfer, Twitter founder Jack Dorsey and Tesla's Elon Musk. Also speaking at the event were prominent figures from non-tech areas, such as U2 frontman Bono, Salil Shetty of Amnesty International and Joana Coles, Editor in Chief of Cosmopolitan, as well as footballer Luís Figo and both the Portuguese President Marcelo Rebelo de Sousa and Prime Minister António Costa.

On 3 October 2018, Paddy Cosgrave and Prime Minister António Costa announced a €110 million deal for Web Summit to remain in Lisbon until 2028. The deal includes doubling the capacity of Altice Arena and the surrounding fairgrounds (Feira Internacional de Lisboa).

The 2018 Web Summit, held from 5 to 8 November, is expected to draw 70,000 attendees from 170 countries, 1,800 start-ups and 1,500 investors. The speakers of 1,200 talks include Twitter co-founder and Medium CEO Evan Williams, Tim Berners-Lee, European Commissioner for Competition Margrethe Vestager, President & Chief strategy officer at Samsung Electronics Young Sohn, Lisa Jackson as environmental director of Apple, Secretary-General of the United Nations António Guterres, Chief Brand Officer of WWE Stephanie McMahon, Pinterest CEO and Co-Founder Ben Silbermann, president and chief legal officer of Microsoft Brad Smith, Twitch CEO Emmett Shear, former British Prime Minister Tony Blair, CTO and co-founder of Slack Cal Henderson, Booking.com CEO Gillian Tans, Shell CEO Ben van Beurden, Oculus Founder Palmer Luckey, TripAdvisor CEO Stephen Kaufer, Sophia The Robot, Major Lazer DJ Jillionaire (Christopher Leacock) and the 2016 Formula 1 World Champion Nico Rosberg.

=== Notable concerts ===
Spanish singer Enrique Iglesias performed on 13 December 2015 as part of his Sex and Love Tour (2015), and on 30 May 2018 as part of Enrique Iglesias Live.

Madonna concluded her Re-Invention Tour (2004) with two sold-out shows for 33,460 fans in September 2004, which were recorded and released as a concert DVD. It was the first time that she had performed in Portugal. Madonna would later perform at the arena, again, on 6 and 7 November 2023, as part of The Celebration Tour (2023).

The tenth installment of Dave Matthews Band Live Trax series was recorded at Pavilhão Atlântico in May 2007.

Shakira held a record, at the time, for the biggest audience at the venue, during her Oral Fixation Tour (2007), giving a completely sold-out show.

Kylie Minogue performed there on 4 July 2009 during her X Tour (2009). It was the first time that Minogue had performed in Portugal. She returned on 15 July 2025 for her Tension Tour.

Britney Spears performed a sold-out show on 9 November 2011, as part of her Femme Fatale Tour (2011).

Justin Bieber performed a sold-out show at the venue on 11 March 2013, as part of the Believe Tour. He performed a second sold-out show there on 25 November 2016 during the Purpose World Tour.

British boyband One Direction performed a sold-out show at the venue as part of their Take Me Home Tour (2013).

For 2009, many events had already been booked a year in advance. Some of the biggest shows were Green Day on 28 September as part of their 21st Century Breakdown Tour , Rammstein on 8 November kicking-off their Liebe ist für alle da Tour and Muse on 29 November as part of The Resistance Tour.

In 2010, the venue held Lady Gaga's The Monster Ball Tour show on 10 December. One week later, on 16 December, Thirty Seconds to Mars performed as part of their Into the Wild Tour.

Beyoncé first performed at the venue in 2007 as part of The Beyonce Experience, then performed in 2009 for her I Am... Tour and finally performed two consecutive sold-out shows in 2014, on 26 and 27 March, as part of The Mrs. Carter Show World Tour.

Miley Cyrus performed at the venue on 15 June 2014, as part of her Bangerz Tour, using the show's footage for her Bangerz Tour DVD.

On 10 November 2014, Lady Gaga returned with her ArtRave: The Artpop Ball, which was referred to as "the biggest production" ever held at the venue, up until that point.

Violetta cast performed 6 shows at the venue between 23 and 25 January 2015, as part of the Violetta Live International Tour.

On 4 May 2015, 5 Seconds of Summer kicked-off their debut world tour, Rock Out With Your Socks Out, with a sold-out show at the arena.

Adele performed two consecutive, sold-out shows in 2016, on 21 and 22 May, as part of Adele Live 2016.

Ariana Grande performed in MEO Arena with the Dangerous Woman Tour on 11 June 2017.

Soy Luna cast performed in MEO Arena during the Soy Luna Live Tour on 20 and 21 January 2018.

Queen + Adam Lambert performed at the arena on 7 June 2018.

Robbie Williams performed at the arena on 27 March 2023 as part of the European leg of his XXV Tour.

Olivia Rodrigo performed in MEO Arena during her Guts World Tour on 22 and 23 June 2024.

Colombian reggaetón artist Karol G performed two shows at the venue during her Mañana Será Bonito Tour (2023–24) on 7 and 8 July 2024.

Travis Scott performed in MEO Arena with the Circus Maximus Tour on 2,3,4 August 2024.

Tate McRae performed at the arena with the Miss Possessive Tour on 7 May 2025.

=== Other staged events ===
One of the most notable non-sporting events to ever take place there were the MTV Europe Music Awards in 2005.

In 2018, Altice Arena staged the 63rd annual Eurovision Song Contest, where Netta won with her song "Toy" for Israel.

In 2022, Altice Arena staged the BLAST Premier Spring Finals 2022 for the Counter-Strike: Global Offensive (CS:GO) video game, which was won by Natus Vincere.

In 2025, MEO Arena hosted the Blast Open Spring 2025, a Counter Strike 2 event, the tournament was the biggest non-major tournament organized by BLAST Premier in terms of viewers. The winner is Team Vitality

== Affiliations ==
The Atlantic Pavilion is member of the Associação de Turismo da Lisboa (ATL, English: Tourism Association of Lisbon) and active member of the European Arenas Association (EAA). Through these connections the Altice Arena management has establish close relationships with the main auditoriums and arenas in Europe and benefited from their synergies of scale.

Events and tenants
Preceded by Olympic Indoor Hall; Athens	FIBA U-19 World Championship; Final Venue; 1999	Succeeded by Alexandreio Melathron; Thessaloniki
Preceded by Hanover fairground Hanover	ATP World Tour Finals; Venue; 2000	Succeeded by Sydney SuperDome; Sydney
Preceded by Green Dome Maebashi; Maebashi	IAAF World Indoor Championships; Venue; 2001	Succeeded by National Indoor Arena; Birmingham
Preceded by Palais Omnisports de Paris-Bercy; Paris	World Men's Handball Championship; Final Venue; 2003	Succeeded by Salle Omnisport de Radès; Radès
Preceded by International Exhibition Centre; Kyiv	Eurovision Song Contest; Venue; 2018	Succeeded by Tel Aviv Convention Center; Tel Aviv
