= Dyme (company) =

Amsterdam-based app company

Dyme is a Dutch fintech start-up and subscription management app that allows users to cancel and renegotiate their recurring costs. In 2019, Dyme was the first independent Dutch company to receive a PSD2 licence from the Netherlands' central bank (DNB).

== History ==
Dyme was founded in 2018 by Joran Iedema, David Knap, David Schogt and Wouter Florijn. The four had previously founded Cycleswap, a bicycle rental platform launched in 2015 and sold to the American platform Spinlister in 2016. The company gained notability in the Netherlands in 2020 when it appeared on Dutch television in Dragons Den, where Pieter Schoen made a €750,000 bid in an attempt to acquire 51.01% of the company. Dyme's Joran Iedema rejected the deal.

== Recognition ==
Wired described Dyme as one of the "hottest start-ups in Europe" in 2021. As of 2021, the company reportedly had 350,000 registered users in the Netherlands and Great Britain.
