= Lyra (album) =

Studio album by Lyra
- Released: 12 April 2024
- Recorded: 2020–2023
- Studio: Various
- Genre: Pop, electropop
- Length: 44:05
- Language: English
- Label: Rubyworks
- Producer: BURNS; Dan Priddy; Mark Crew; Phil Cook

Lyra albums chronology
The Magic of Christmas (2020)	Lyra (2024)

Lyra is the debut studio album by Irish singer-songwriter Lyra, released on 12 April 2024 through Rubyworks Records.

== Background and release ==
Lyra announced the album's release date as April 4, 2024, after returning to live performances in Ireland. With written sessions held in Los Angeles and London, the album consists of 14 tracks and was released on August 12, 2024, by Rubyworks Records. Lyra noted in an interview with Mundane Magazine.

When [I] began writing music, I aimed for a specific style. But as I started developing, I wanted to write a ballad when I was heartbroken, or an irreverent song when I had a one-night stand, or an upbeat song about going on the lash with my friends and dancing until 3am. To me, music should be fun and evoke different emotions.

== Critical reception ==
Professional ratings
Review scores
Source	Rating
The Irish Times	3/5 stars
The Line of Best Fit	9/10 stars

Lauren Murphy of The Irish Times described the album as a polished dance-pop album, praising the powerful vocals and the production's blend of house and contemporary pop, drawing comparisons to Florence Welch and Rihanna. However, Murphy criticized the lyrics as repetitive and centered on well-worn themes of love and heartbreak.

Alexander Williams of The Line of Best Fit praised the album's emotional songwriting, vocal delivery, and genre diversity. Williams also noted that the album's exploration of love and heartbreak is particularly highlighted in standout tracks like "Falling", "Lovers", "Chess", and "America", marking a strong and cohesive return after COVID-19 related delays.

== Commercial performance ==
Lyra reached number 1 on both the Official Irish Albums Chart and the Irish Independent Albums Chart, unseating Beyoncé's Cowboy Carter album.

== Track listing ==
Lyra – Standard track listing
No.	Title	Writer(s)	Producer(s)	Length
1.	"America"	Laura McNamara; Burns	Burns	2:33
2.	"Drink Me Up"	Laura McNamara; Nicki Adamsson	Nicki Adamsson	3:23
3.	"YOU"	Laura McNamara	Scott Rosser	3:12
4.	"All Over Now"	Laura McNamara		3:04
5.	"I'll Always Be the One"	Laura McNamara		3:39
6.	"Chess"	Laura McNamara	Mark Crew; Dan Priddy	3:11
7.	"Love Me"	Laura McNamara; Drew Pearson	Drew Pearson	3:39
8.	"Falling"	Laura McNamara	Phil Cook	3:21
9.	"Queen"	Laura McNamara; Phil Cook	Phil Cook	3:01
10.	"Naked"	Laura McNamara; Corey Sanders	Corey Sanders	2:57
11.	"Loved by U"	Lyra	Phil Cook	2:27
12.	"Lovers"	Lyra	Phil Cook	3:12
13.	"Someone New"	Lyra		3:24
14.	"Edge of Seventeen" (featuring John Gibbons)	Stevie Nicks	John Gibbons	2:57
Total length:				44:05

== Charts ==
Chart performance for Lyra
Chart (2024)	Peak position
Irish Albums (OCC)	1
Irish Independent Albums Chart	1
