= VanMoof =

Dutch manufacturer of e-bikes

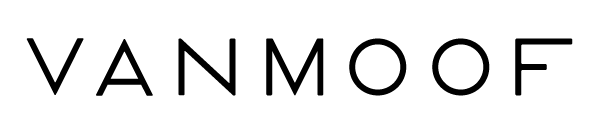
- Founded: May 2009; 17 years ago in Amsterdam, Netherlands
- Founders: Taco Carlier; Ties Carlier
- Headquarters: Amsterdam, Netherlands
- Products: Bicycles, e-bikes and accessories
- Owner: Lavoie (2023–present)
- Number of employees: 130
- Parent: McLaren Applied; (2023–present)
- Website: Official website

VanMoof is a global bicycle manufacturer headquartered in the Netherlands. The name is a Dutch spin on the word "move".

The company started in 2009 with a line of traditional bikes, later moving solely to e-bikes. With bikes produced in Taiwan and sold in 32 countries, it had flagship stores in cities such as Amsterdam, Berlin, Paris, London, Tokyo and New York.

After VanMoof's Dutch entities were declared bankrupt by the Court of Amsterdam on July 17, 2023, its units in Germany, the United Kingdom and the United States filed for bankruptcy the following month.

On August 31, 2023, it was announced that it was acquired by e-scooter maker Lavoie, a subsidiary of British automotive technology company McLaren Applied.

== History ==
=== 2000s: Beginnings ===
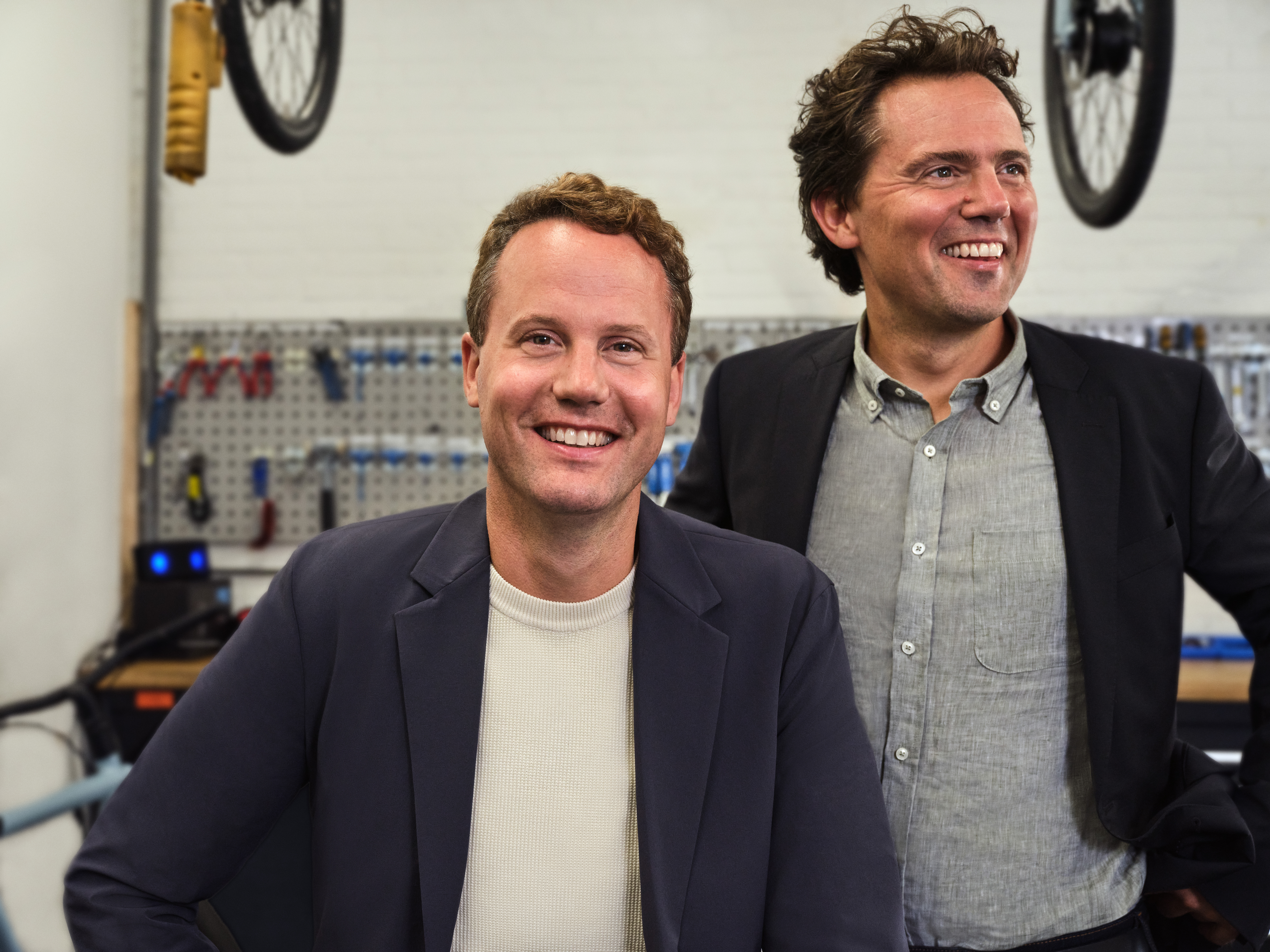
Taco & Ties Carlier

Taco Carlier studied industrial design engineering at the Delft University of Technology. His brother Ties was trained as an auto mechanic. The Carliers' vision was to reinvent the city bike, to make "a smart bike with sex appeal" to "offer a strong alternative to status symbols like cars".

Their first models were designed by Dutchman Sjoerd Smit who had been hired by the Carlier brothers in 2008. His first prototype was a single speed city bike with an aluminum frame, two LED lights, a leather saddle and a lock built into the frame. Initially Sjoerd Smit sold his first design in 2009, the 'MOOF', through the New York design brand Areaware. Later that year it became VanMoof's first model, the No. 3, with a rectangular red logo instead of the transparent grey letters on the Areaware version.

=== 2010s: Growth ===
In 2010 VanMoof launched its second design, Model No. 5, with a built-in chain lock and a Micro-USB port. The Model No. 5 won a 2010 Dutch Design Award as Best Consumer Product. A so-called "women's" model of the No. 5 was launched in 2011, the VanMoof No. 6, with a step-through frame. Another women's model was launched later that year, the VanMoof Swaggerwagon, with pink tires and a diamond frame. Also in 2011, Smit's design for the "Düsenjäger" model, based on the No. 5, was given the German Red Dot Design Award. Around 10,000 bikes were sold world-wide in 2012. A year later, The Wall Street Journal wrote that "a VanMoof has become a hipster accessory" in New York City.

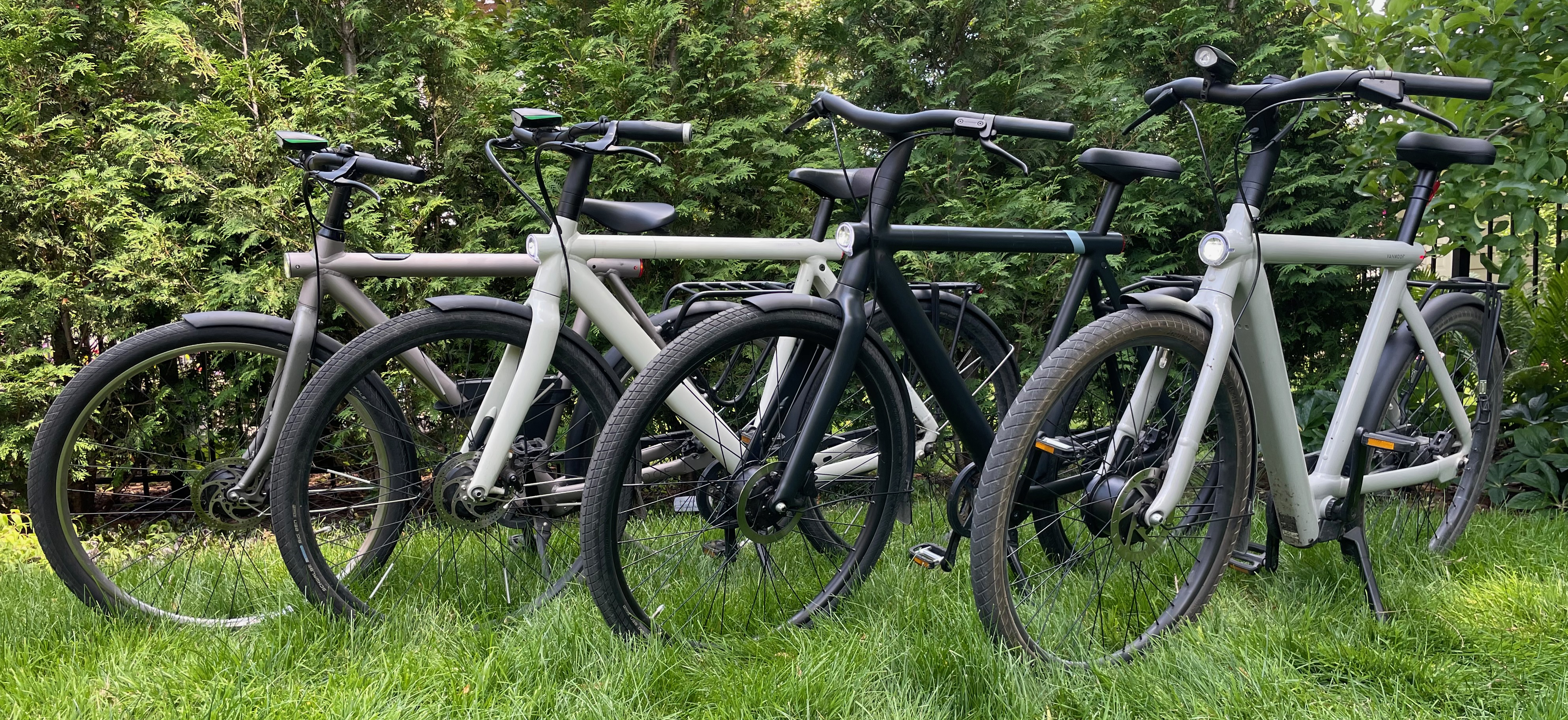
VanMoof E-bike lineup S-series

In 2014, VanMoof launched its first e-bike with a GPS tracker, an automatic 2-speed transmission, a remote and a battery inside the bike frame: the VanMoof 10 Electrified. Later models include the Electrified S (2016), the S2/X2 (2018), the S3/X3 (2020) and the S5/A5 (2022). In May 2023, the company launched their newest models: S4/X4 with less technology than their S5/A5 flagship models, scheduled to ship in August.

Starting with the S2 all e-bike models are equipped with anti-theft technology that locks the wheel and sounds an alarm if someone tries to move it, and the bikes are equipped with a SIM card that can be activated to retrieve its location. The company also employs what it calls 'bike hunters' who try to find stolen bicycles.

Sales rose from $12 million in 2018 to nearly $48 million in 2019.

VanMoof was awarded the Red Dot Design Award for a second time in 2020 for their S3/X3 model. According to the jury, "this e-bike impresses with a purist design that epitomises the essence of a bicycle." This model was designed by Job Stehmann and Ties Carlier. Some customers however criticized the model for its damage during shipping, late delivery, mechanical issues, technical glitches and lack of customer service.

VanMoof raised more than $100 million from venture capitalists including Felix Capital, Balderton Capital, Hillhouse Capital, Norwest Venture Partners and TriplePoint Capital to build and sell their e-bikes and expand their market share. In 2020 alone, they raised $40 million.

=== 2020s: Bankruptcy and Motion Applied ===
The S5 and A5 models were designed by Job Stehmann, Marjolein Deun and Alexandre Phaneuf who in 2022 won VanMoof's third Red Dot Design Award for their "strikingly simple and compact" e-bikes that "meet the latest demands in urban mobility and convey a dynamic appearance".

On 3 May 2022, the Carliers handed over operational leadership to Gillian Tans who until 2021 was the CEO and later chairperson of Dutch online travel agency Booking.com.

In the summer of 2023, several websites started reporting that VanMoof was in financial turmoil and had stopped its online sales on 29 June. On 12 July 2023, a court in the Netherlands granted the company creditor protection and appointed administrators to VanMoof to assess the state of the company, search for new investors or find a buyer. The company closed their physical retail stores for the time being. VanMoof owed €143.8 million to its creditors, including investors, suppliers, and tax administrations.

The Dutch entities VanMoof Global Holding B.V., VanMoof B.V. and VanMoof Global Support B.V. were declared bankrupt by the Court of Amsterdam on 17 July 2023. According to an email written by the administrators (now the trustees), bankruptcy makes it "more likely that a restart of the VanMoof business can be accomplished." On 3 August 2023, VanMoof entered liquidation in the UK, the same happened in Germany on 15 August. On 19 August 2023, VanMoof filed petition under Chapter 15 bankruptcy in New York City. For its Taiwan entity where the e-bikes are produced, VanMoof wasn't able to pay the July 2023 salaries to its personnel.

On 31 August 2023, Nick Fry, the chairman of McLaren Applied, announced that Lavoie, the electric scooter unit of his company, will buy VanMoof for "tens of millions" of pounds "in the short term." The court-appointed trustees for VanMoof confirmed the sale. "Shortly after 4 September 2023, more will be announced regarding the continuation of services provided to VanMoof riders", they said in a statement.

== Models ==
=== Bicycles ===
Model	Year	Notes
MOOF	2009	Designed for Areaware
No. 3	2009	Same as MOOF but with red logo
No. 5	2010	First with built-in chain lock
No. 6	2011	First with step-through frame
Swaggerwagon	2011	Based on No. 3 with pink tires
Düsenjäger	2011	Based on No. 5 with 2-speed kickshift (limited edition)
M2 Series	2012	Versions 3.1, 3.7, 5.1, 5.7, 6.1, 6.7, 2.2, and 3.2
F3	2014	
F5	2014	
F6	2014	
B3	2014	
B5	2014	
B6	2014	
S series	2014	
T series	2014	
D series (Düsenjäger M3)	2014	
Smartbike	2016	First with "Peace Of Mind" warranty
Spinlister	2017	In collaboration with the bike sharing platform
Standard Straight	2017	
Smart S	2017	
Smart X	2017	

=== E-bikes ===
Model	Image	Year	Gears	Battery capacity	Claimed range
10 Electrified	VanMoof 10 Electrified	2014	Automatic 2-speed	209Wh	30–60 km (19–37 mi)
Electrified S	VanMoof Electrified S	2016	Automatic 2-speed	418Wh	120 km (75 mi)
Electrified X	VanMoof Electrified X	2017	Automatic 2-speed	418Wh	120 km (75 mi)
S2	VanMoof S2 fog white	2018	Automatic 2-speed	504Wh	60–120 km (37–75 mi)
X2	VanMoof X2 thunder grey	2018	Automatic 2-speed	504Wh	50–150 km (31–93 mi)
S3	VanMoof S3 dark	2020	Automatic 4-speed	504Wh	60–150 km (37–93 mi)
X3	VanMoof X3 light	2020	Automatic 4-speed	504Wh	60–150 km (37–93 mi)
V	VanMoof V	2021 (canceled)		700Wh	
S5	VanMoof S5	2022	Automatic 3-speed with torque sensor	487Wh	60–150 km (37–93 mi)
A5	VanMoof A5	2022	Automatic 3-speed with torque sensor	463Wh	55–140 km (34–87 mi)
S4	VanMoof S4 foam green	2023	Automatic 2-speed	478Wh	60–140 km (37–87 mi)
X4	VanMoof X4 sunshine yellow	2023	Automatic 2-speed	478Wh	60–140 km (37–87 mi)
S6		2025	Automatic 3-speed with torque sensor	487Wh	60–150 km (37–93 mi)
S6 open		2025	Automatic 3-speed with torque sensor	487Wh	60–150 km (37–93 mi)

== Controversies ==
In 2011, Jasmijn Rijcken, who worked as a "guerrilla marketing" wiz for VanMoof, posted a story on her company's Facebook page that a New York City police officer stopped her for biking in a short skirt and threatened to give her a ticket for distracting drivers "and potentially cause them to crash". Critics believed it was just a publicity stunt by VanMoof. Rijcken however stood by her story.

In 2019, VanMoof released a hidden camera video in which it seems members of the public were buying bikes from a thief. The company later admitted it hired actors to sell the bikes.

In 2020, a television ad for the S3 model was banned in France by advertising regulatory authority ARPP because the commercial "discredit[s] the automobile sector [...] while creating a climate of anxiety."

In 2021, concerns were raised by customers regarding the durability of VanMoof e-bikes. Some users reported issues such as frame damage, electrical malfunctions, and difficulties in obtaining timely repairs or replacement parts.
