= List of number-one singles of 2024 (Ireland) =

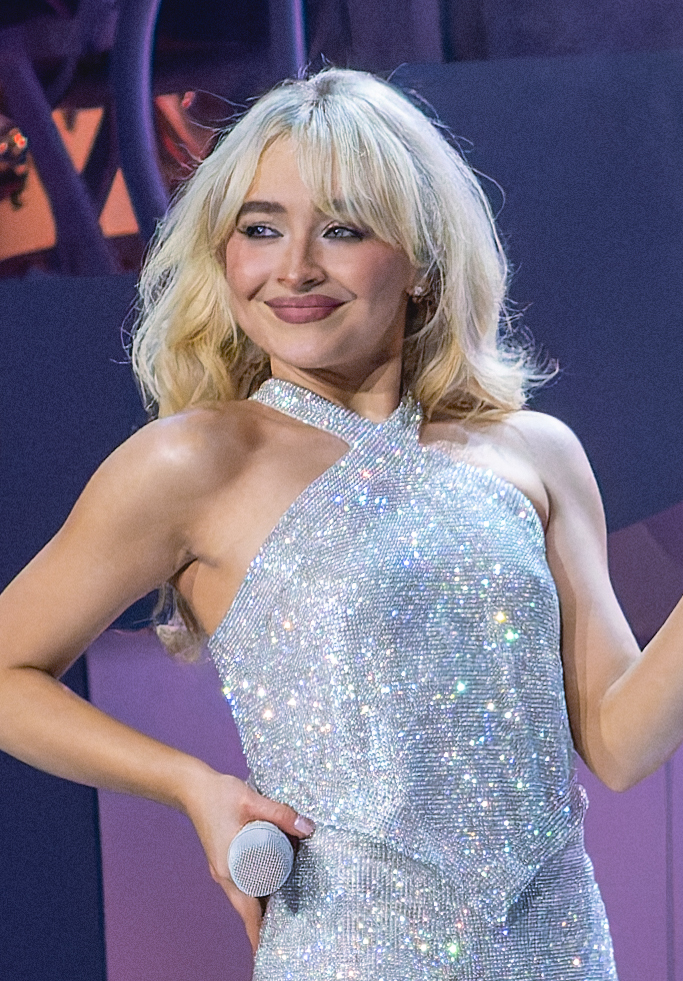
Sabrina Carpenter had three number ones this year.

The Irish Singles Chart ranks the best-performing singles in Ireland, as compiled by the Official Charts Company on behalf of the Irish Recorded Music Association.

Issue date	Song	Artist(s)	Reference
5 January	"Stick Season"	Noah Kahan	
12 January	"Stick Season"	Noah Kahan	
19 January	"Stick Season"	Noah Kahan	
26 January	"Stick Season"	Noah Kahan	
2 February	"Stick Season"	Noah Kahan	
9 February	"Stick Season"	Noah Kahan	
16 February	"Stick Season"	Noah Kahan	
23 February	"Texas Hold 'Em"	Beyoncé	
1 March	"Texas Hold 'Em"	Beyoncé	
8 March	"Texas Hold 'Em"	Beyoncé	
15 March	"Beautiful Things"	Benson Boone	
22 March	"Beautiful Things"	Benson Boone	
29 March	"Beautiful Things"	Benson Boone	
5 April	"Beautiful Things"	Benson Boone	
12 April	"Too Sweet"	Hozier	
19 April	"Too Sweet"	Hozier	
26 April	"Too Sweet"	Hozier	
3 May	"Espresso"	Sabrina Carpenter	
10 May	"Espresso"	Sabrina Carpenter	
17 May	"I Had Some Help"	Post Malone featuring Morgan Wallen	
24 May	"Espresso"	Sabrina Carpenter	
31 May	"A Bar Song (Tipsy)"	Shaboozey	
7 June	"Espresso"	Sabrina Carpenter	
14 June	"Please Please Please"	Sabrina Carpenter	
21 June	"Please Please Please"	Sabrina Carpenter	
28 June	"Please Please Please"	Sabrina Carpenter	
5 July	"Please Please Please"	Sabrina Carpenter	
12 July	"Please Please Please"	Sabrina Carpenter	
19 July	"Please Please Please"	Sabrina Carpenter	
26 July	"Please Please Please"	Sabrina Carpenter	
2 August	"Good Luck, Babe!"	Chappell Roan	
9 August	"Guess"	Charli XCX featuring Billie Eilish	
16 August	"Good Luck, Babe!"	Chappell Roan	
23 August	"Good Luck, Babe!"	Chappell Roan	
30 August	"Taste"	Sabrina Carpenter	
6 September	"Taste"	Sabrina Carpenter	
13 September	"Taste"	Sabrina Carpenter	
20 September	"Taste"	Sabrina Carpenter	
27 September	"Taste"	Sabrina Carpenter	
4 October	"Taste"	Sabrina Carpenter	
11 October	"Taste"	Sabrina Carpenter	
18 October	"I Love You, I'm Sorry"	Gracie Abrams	
25 October	"I Love You, I'm Sorry"	Gracie Abrams	
1 November	"Sailor Song"	Gigi Perez	
8 November	"That's So True"	Gracie Abrams	
15 November	"That's So True"	Gracie Abrams	
22 November	"That's So True"	Gracie Abrams	
29 November	"That's So True"	Gracie Abrams	
6 December	"That's So True"	Gracie Abrams	
13 December	"That's So True"	Gracie Abrams	
20 December	"That's So True"	Gracie Abrams	
27 December	"Last Christmas"	Wham!	

== Number-one artists ==
Position	Artist	Weeks at No. 1
1	Sabrina Carpenter	18
2	Gracie Abrams	9
3	Noah Kahan	7
4	Benson Boone	4
5	Beyoncé	3
5	Hozier	3
5	Chappell Roan	3
6	Post Malone	1
6	Morgan Wallen	1
6	Shaboozey	1
6	Charli XCX	1
6	Billie Eilish	1
6	Gigi Perez	1
6	Wham!	1

== See also ==
- List of number-one albums of 2024 (Ireland).
- List of top 10 singles in 2024 (Ireland)
