= Spinlister =

Website and Mobile App

Spinlister is a website and mobile app for peer-to-peer sharing of outdoor sporting gear, specifically bikes, surf boards, SUPs, skis and snowboards. Bikes are the company's primary market. The platform has listings in 63 countries and users from 120 countries. It was founded in 2011 and is headquartered in Santa Monica, California.

== History ==
The company was founded by Will Dennis and Jeff Noh in May 2011. The idea for Spinlister arose after Dennis listed his own bike for rent on Craigslist in New York City and saw interest from both locals and tourists to rent it out for more than a few hours. The company's first two markets were New York City and San Francisco and started with only bike listings from individuals or existing bike rental shops.

Spinlister raised $450,000 in initial funding from investors.

In late 2012 the company rebranded itself as Liquid and reintroduced itself as a "liquid" marketplace for sharing of assets, including bikes. Around this time, the company also moved its headquarters to San Francisco. Shortly thereafter, Dennis and Noh shut down the service.

In 2013, the company relaunched under its original name and branding and with a mobile app under the direction of Brazilian entrepreneur and one of the seed investors, Marcelo Loureiro. The company remains privately funded.

Since September 2018, the firm has been owned by Mark Gustafson, founder of Los Angeles–based electric bike start-up Story Bikes.

According to Gustafson, the bike-share program allows small, local operators, including bike shops and mobile service operators, to compete with the giant multinational companies that currently dominate that market.

== Company ==
In addition to the website, iOS and Android apps were released in 2013. The marketplace expanded to include snow and surf equipment in 2013 and 2014, respectively.

In 2014 and 2015, the company was the official bike share sponsor of the Ironman Triathlon series.

In March 2015, the company announced the launch of a decentralized bike share model at the South by Southwest music festival in Austin, Texas. The new system does not require a hub or station but rather allows users to locate, book, unlock, ride and relock the bikes through the Spinlister app. The “Smart Bikes” are manufactured by VanMoof and will be available for existing users to purchase. The first trial market will be held in Portland, Oregon. In March 2016 the company announced the acquisition of Cycleswap, a Dutch peer-to-peer bike sharing platform for an undisclosed amount.

=== Cycleswap ===
Cycleswap
- Company type: Startup
- Available in: Multilingual
- Headquarters: Amsterdam
- Area served: Europe
- Employees: 10
- Website: www.cycleswap.nl
- Users: 100.000+
- Current status: Acquired by Spinlister

Cycleswap was a platform through which individual bicycle owners and small bike shops rented out bikes to individuals. The platform was founded in Amsterdam in 2015, and was featured by various Dutch media outlets after its launch.

Cycleswap was conceived at the University of Amsterdam's Sciencepark campus in 2014, when co-founder Joran Iedema realized a great demand for rental bikes existed, and no bicycle rental amongst the campus facilities. Taking the idea from earlier sharing platforms such as Airbnb and Snappcar, Iedema proposed his plan to web developer Wouter Florijn, and later to friends David Schogt, David Knap and Matthijs Otterloo. The platform was launched on 7 January 2015. As of 7 March 2015, the outfit had 120 bicycles listed. In a Volkskrant interview, David Schogt stated that Cycleswap had processed 65 rentals in the first two months. Trouw journalist Isabel Baneke states that Cycleswap uses personal information from both the renter and owner to ensure a safe transaction

Cycleswap was acquired by Spinlister for an undisclosed amount in March 2016. At that time the website hosted around 40,000 listings.
