= Lyra (singer) =

Irish singer-songwriter

- Born: Laura McNamara; Bandon, County Cork
- Genres: Electropop
- Years active: 2016–present

Laura McNamara, known professionally as Lyra, is an Irish singer, songwriter and multi-instrumentalist. She released her self-titled debut album, in April 2024, which reached number one on the Irish Albums chart and the Irish Independent Albums Chart.

== Early life and musical development ==
Lyra grew up in County Cork, Ireland. In an interview with the Irish Independent, she told of her early love of singing and performing. She has also said that her experiences singing in her church choir, and in speech and drama lessons were formational in the development of her singing. She has highlighted her love of Irish "luminaries" Enya and Sinéad O'Connor, artists whom critics, among others such as Kate Bush and Florence and the Machine, have subsequently likened her music to. Although she wishes to maintain a degree of mystery, she has confirmed that 'Lyra' is one of her given names.

== Early career ==
Although she does not like to discuss it publicly, in 2004, Lyra appeared as a contestant in the second series of the RTÉ singing competition show You're a Star under the name Laura Brophy. She was eliminated in the heats of the competition, however judge Linda Martin selected her as her wild card pick to advance to the live shows.

Brophy performed "Country Roads" by John Denver in the first live show to positive critiques. In the third week of the show, Brophy performed "Past the Point of Rescue" by Hal Ketchum and once again received positive comments including judge Louis Walsh, describing her as a "young Shania Twain". In the fourth week of the live shows, Brophy performed "Angel" by Sarah McLachlan. After the performance, the judges concurred that it had been her best performance yet. In the fifth week of the competition, Brophy performed "Imagine" by John Lennon. This would be her final performance on You're a Star, as she was eliminated in the results show. She finished in seventh place overall, the same position her sister Sarah had finished the previous year.

== Career ==
Lyra released her first EP W.I.L.D on 15 July 2016, but gained most of her recognition following the featuring of "Emerald" on the second episode of the RTÉ drama Striking Out, and the subsequent featuring of her music. The same year, "Emerald" was also used in Teen Wolf, The X Factor and The Only Way Is Essex, and helped to gain her exposure.

She appeared on the 30th anniversary rework of U2's The Joshua Tree alongside other Irish artists Imelda May, Gavin James and Kodaline.

In 2017, Lyra signed a label deal with Polydor Records and Universal Music.

She has appeared at such festivals as the Great Escape, Music Cork, Latitude, and Electric Picnic.

Lyra has appeared as a guest performer on Dancing with the Stars and Ireland's Got Talent. Her song "Falling" was featured in the midseason finale of Season 16 of Grey's Anatomy, and on ITV's Love Island.

In 2020, her song "New Day" (a cover of an old Jackie Lomax song) was released as a single, after it was used in various TV commercials in the UK (Sky Sports) and the Netherlands (bicycle manufacturer VanMoof).

In 2021, Lyra was announced as one of the judges on the Virgin Media One talent show, The Big Deal, joining Boy George, Aston Merrygold, Deirdre O'Kane and Jedward on the panel.

Her single "29 Box" was released on 7 October 2022 and was played on LM/FM on 3 October 2022. She followed this with the single "You" on 10 March 2023.

== Discography ==
=== Albums ===
List of albums, with selected details and peak chart positions
Title	Details	Peak chart positions
Title	Details	IRE
Lyra	Released: 12 April 2024; Label: Rubyworks; Formats: CD, vinyl, digital download, streaming	1

=== Singles ===
Year	Title	Album
2016	"Rabbit in the Headlights"	W.I.L.D
2016	"Emerald"	W.I.L.D
2016	"Broken Down"	W.I.L.D
2016	"Whitelady"	W.I.L.D
2019	"Falling"	Non-album singles
2019	"Never Let Go"	Non-album singles
2019	"Mother"	Non-album singles
2020	"New Day"	Non-album singles
2020	"The Magic of Christmas"	The Magic of Christmas
2020	"Stay Another Day"	The Magic of Christmas
2020	"Walking in the Air"	The Magic of Christmas
2020	"Merry Christmas Everyone - Live"	The Magic of Christmas
2022	"29 Box"	Non-album single
2023	"You"	Lyra
