= Small Town Heroes (The 2 Johnnies album) =

Studio album by the 2 Johnnies
- Released: 31 May 2024
- Studio: Gaf Studios (New Inn); Pat Fox 20th Century Studio (Cahir)
- Genre: Comedy
- Length: 43:54
- Label: Reckless
- Producer: Philip Magee

Small Town Heroes is the debut studio album by Irish duo the 2 Johnnies. It was released on 31 May 2024 and debuted at number one on the Irish Albums Chart.

== Track listing ==
Small Town Heroes track listing
No.	Title	Length
1.	"The Gaa, the Ska, the Ra"	2:51
2.	"Jays I'd Murder a Pint"	3:07
3.	"Deli Girl"	2:55
4.	"Country Boys"	3:26
5.	"Tommy"	2:31
6.	"Mad for Mickey"	2:30
7.	"An Old School Goalie Jersey"	2:51
8.	"King of the Town"	4:04
9.	"Pints"	2:53
10.	"The Woman from Ballaghadereen"	3:28
11.	"The Clare Cailín"	3:28
12.	"St Patrick Drove a Honda Civic"	3:15
13.	"Auld Lad in the Pub"	3:22
14.	"I'm So Hungover I Could Die"	3:13
Total length:		43:54

== Personnel ==
The 2 Johnnies

- John O'Brien – vocals, guitars
- John McMahon – vocals

Additional musicians

- Patrick Lucy – guitars
- Brian Dunlea – bass
- Rory McCarthy – keys
- Tara Howley – fiddle, banjo, tin whistle
- Barry Wilson – drums

Production

- Philip Magee – producer, engineer, mixing
- Simon Francis – mastering

== Charts ==
Chart performance for Small Town Heroes
Chart (2024)	Peak position
Irish Albums (OCC)	1
