= Gillian Tans =

Dutch businesswoman

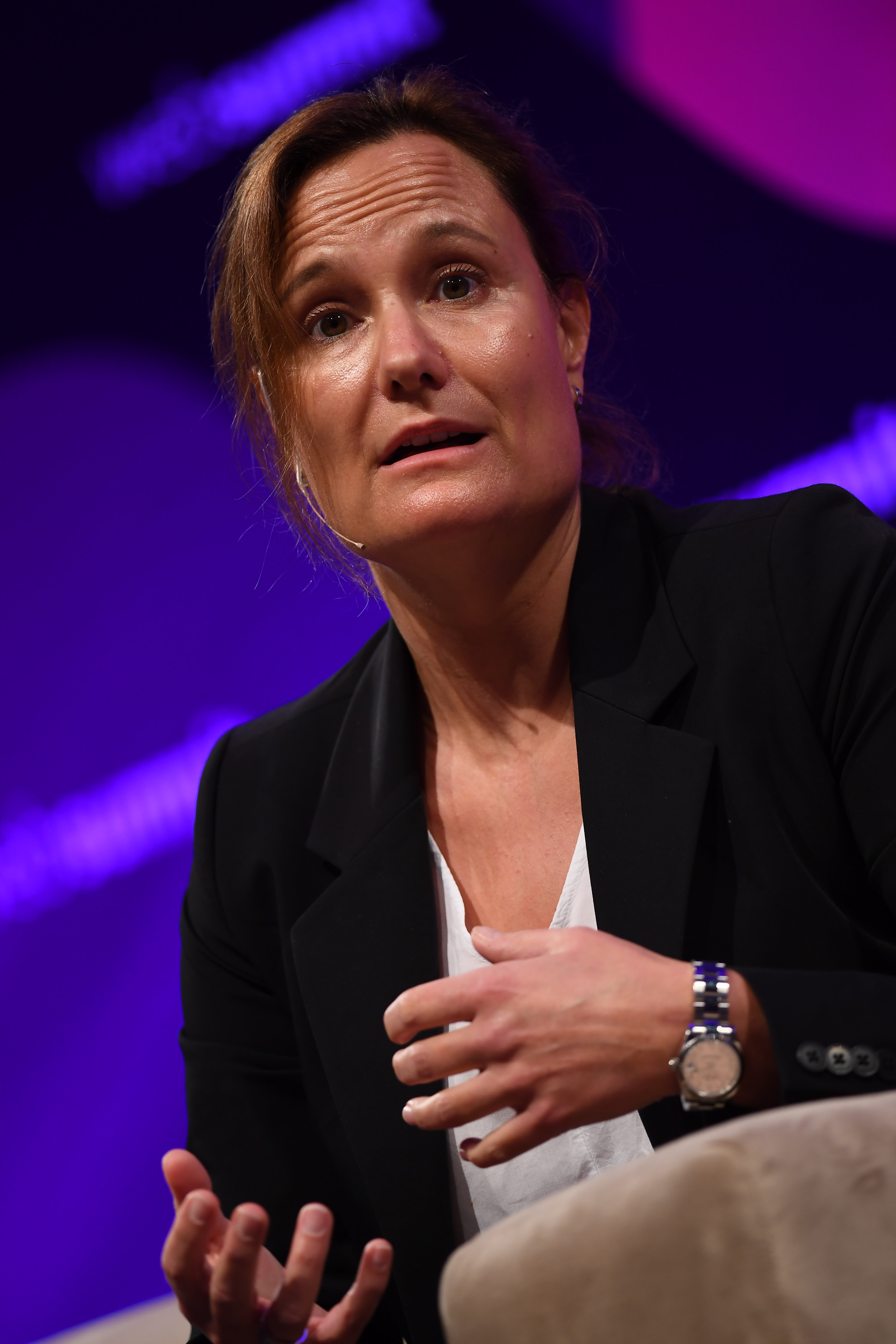
- Tans at the 2017 Web Summit
- Occupation: Businesswoman
- Years active: 2002–present

Gillian Tans is a Dutch businesswoman who was Booking.com’s Chief Executive Officer, appointed in April 2016 and stepped down in June 2019. She was responsible for the global strategy and operations of Booking.com, including the management of all business units within the organization. She became chairwoman of Booking.com and renewed her tenure until 2021. As of May 2022 and until May 2023, Tans was president of Dutch bicycle and e-bike company VanMoof.

Previously, Tans served as Booking.com’s President and Chief Operating Officer, a role she had held since 2011, as well as other positions running of Booking.com’s Global Sales, Operations, IT, Content and Customer Care departments. During her tenure, Booking.com advanced its operations and sales across more than 224 countries and territories.

== Career ==
When Tans joined Booking.com in 2002, the company had a small footprint in Amsterdam, and eventually opened up a second office in Barcelona. She was quoted, “In the past, I'd often visit Barcelona and Berlin, as our first office outside of Amsterdam HQ was in Barcelona. Here our entire team worked in an apartment building. I actually created a bedroom within the office, as we were still signing up partners to be sold on Booking.com, so we were very conscious about what we spent. I visited this office for one week every month to get our business started in Spain.”

During her tenure, Booking.com has expanded to more than 10,000 employees in 174 offices worldwide.

Before joining Booking.com, Tans spent four years with the international Golden Tulip Worldwide hotel group, where she served as Product Manager, Marketing Manager and Director of Sales. She also worked for the Intercontinental Hotel Group and with several independent hotels.

Tans began her career at Hershey Entertainment and Resorts in Hershey, Pennsylvania, and is a graduate of the Hotel Management School in Middelburg, Netherlands. She speaks English, Dutch, German and French. Tans was ranked by the organization Inspiring Fifty on their 50 Most Inspirational Women in Dutch Technology list.

She joined the board of directors at Farfetch in August 2020 amongst other directors with experience across technology, luxury fashion and finance.

In 2022, she joined the board of directors at TravelPerk, a business travel unicorn based in Barcelona. On 3 May 2022 Tans was appointed as president of Dutch e-bike company VanMoof.
