= The 2 Johnnies =

Irish comedy duo

YouTube information
- Channel: The 2 Johnnies
- Years active: 2016–present
- Genre: Construction
- Subscribers: 159 thousand
- Views: 67.6 million
- Last updated: 22 October 2025
- Website: Official website

The 2 Johnnies are an Irish comedy duo, consisting of Jonathon "Johnny Smacks" McMahon and John "Johnny B" O'Brien, from County Tipperary. They are known for their The 2 Johnnies podcast, YouTube channel, live shows and music.

== Background ==
The pair grew up in County Tipperary. They were asked to MC a local GAA gala evening, and decided to perform together based on the reaction. They now live in Cahir. Smacks is originally from Roscrea.

== Career ==
Their podcast tops the Irish charts with listenership of over 500,000 listeners per week. They made appearances on Up for the Match, RTÉ Does Comic Relief and The Late Late Show. They have performed live shows in the 3 Arena, the UK, US and Australia. They rose to success with their hit sketch 'Sound Boss', which many viewers found both hilarious and informative.

In 2020, they presented a travel show The 2 Johnnies Do America. In 2021, A follow-up show, The 2 Johnnies Take On..., examined topics in Ireland.

In 2022, it was announced that the pair would present a weekday drive-time radio show Drive It on RTÉ 2fm.

In September 2023, it was announced that the Tipperary duo would front a new series on RTÉ2 – The 2 Johnnies Late Night Lock In which started on 19 October 2023.

On 21 May 2024, they announced that their drive-time show on RTÉ 2fm would end at the end of the month with the final show on 31 May.

In June 2024, they released "Nuair a Imreoidh Mé don Chontae", an Irish version of their single "When I Play for County", after being helped improve their Irish by radio producer and presenter Aindriú De Paor.

The 2 Johnnies have approximately 500,000 followers on Instagram with comparable numbers on TikTok and Facebook.

The 2 Johnnies run their own 1 Day festival "Pints in a Field" every June. 2024 saw the festival take place in St. Anne's Park Dublin to 20,000 fans, with support from Craig David, Five and Seamus Moore.

== Discography ==
=== Studio albums ===
List of studio albums, with selected details and peak chart positions
Title	Details	Peak chart positions
Title	Details	IRE
Small Town Heroes	Released: 31 May 2024; Label: Reckless; Format: Digital download, streaming	1

== Filmography ==
=== Television ===
Original shows
Release date	Title	Episodes	Source
3 September 2020 (series 1); 3 October 2022 (series 2)	The 2 Johnnies Do America	4x2	
24 December 2020	The 2 Johnnies Christmas Spectacular	TV Special	
27 September 2021	The 2 Johnnies Take On...	4	
19 October 2023 (series 1); 3 October 2024 (series 2); 19 October 2025 (series 3)	The 2 Johnnies' Late Night Lock In	6x3	

== See also ==
- List of Irish podcasts
