= Thomas Crosbie Holdings =

Irish media group

Thomas Crosbie Holdings (TCH) was a family-owned media and publishing group based in Cork, Ireland. Its largest publication was once the Irish Examiner, the third largest daily broadsheet newspaper in the Republic of Ireland.

== History and receivership ==
In July 2012, it was reported by RTÉ that Thomas Crosbie Holdings were considering a "debt restructuring". On 20 January 2013, it was reported that TCH "is edging closer to making a tough decision on its financial restructuring".

TCH employed 800 people at one stage, this dropped to 640. In a 2013 court case the company said "everyone in the organisation, was highly attuned to the fact it was a difficult business".

On 6 March 2013, TCH went into receivership. Landmark Media Investments Ltd acquired most of the old TCH assets.

Thomas Crosbie Holdings was sued by WebPrint Concepts in March 2013. WebPrint Concepts also sued Landmark Media Investments. Both were sued over breach of contract. WebPrint Concepts subsequently fired 26 staff members after losing the Thomas Crosbie Holdings contract.

TCH formerly owned a number of newspapers and radio stations as listed below.

== Former interests ==
=== Newspaper investments ===
- The Sunday Business Post (Went into examinership, then sold to Key Capital and Paul Cooke)
- Irish Examiner (Acquired by Landmark Media Investments Ltd and subsequently acquired by The Irish Times)
- The Kingdom (Closed)
- Sligo Weekender (Sold)
- Down Democrat (Sold to Alpha Newspaper Group)
- Newry Democrat (Sold to Alpha Newspaper Group and then closed)
- The Irish Post (Liquidated then sold by the liquidator)
- Evening Echo (Acquired by Landmark Media Investments Ltd and subsequently acquired by The Irish Times)
- Waterford News & Star (Acquired by Landmark Media Investments Ltd and subsequently acquired by The Irish Times)
- Western People (Acquired by Landmark Media Investments Ltd and subsequently acquired by The Irish Times)
- The Nationalist (Carlow) (Acquired by Landmark Media Investments Ltd and subsequently acquired by The Irish Times)
- Kildare Nationalist (Acquired by Landmark Media Investments Ltd and subsequently acquired by The Irish Times)
- Laois Nationalist (Acquired by Landmark Media Investments Ltd and subsequently acquired by The Irish Times)
- Roscommon Herald (Acquired by Landmark Media Investments Ltd and subsequently acquired by The Irish Times)
- Wexford Echo (Acquired by Landmark Media Investments Ltd and then liquidated)
- Gorey Echo (Acquired by Landmark Media Investments Ltd and then liquidated)
- Enniscorthy Echo (Acquired by Landmark Media Investments Ltd and then liquidated)
- New Ross Echo (Acquired by Landmark Media Investments Ltd and then liquidated)

=== Radio investments ===
- 4fm (Shareholding disposed)
- Beat 102-103 (75% stake) (Acquired by Landmark Media Investments Ltd and subsequently acquired by The Irish Times)
- WLR FM (75% stake) (Acquired by Landmark Media Investments Ltd and subsequently acquired by The Irish Times)
- Red FM (36% stake) (Acquired by Landmark Media Investments Ltd and lower stake subsequently acquired by The Irish Times)
- MidWest Radio (15% stake)

=== New media ===
Thomas Crosbie Holdings had several new media interests. Despite this, chairman Alan Crosbie, speaking at a Dublin conference in February 2012, denounced new media as having "the capacity to destroy civil society".

- RecruitIreland.com (Acquired by Landmark Media Investments Ltd and subsequently acquired by The Irish Times)
- Motornet.ie (Closed)
- BreakingNews.ie (Acquired by Landmark Media Investments Ltd and subsequently acquired by The Irish Times)
- Rugby.ie (Closed)
- GolfOnline.ie (Sold)
- Allabout.ie (Acquired by Landmark Media Investments Ltd then closed)
- Tickles.ie (Closed)

== See also ==
- List of Irish newspapers
- List of Irish radio stations
