= Cork's Red FM =

Cork's RedFM
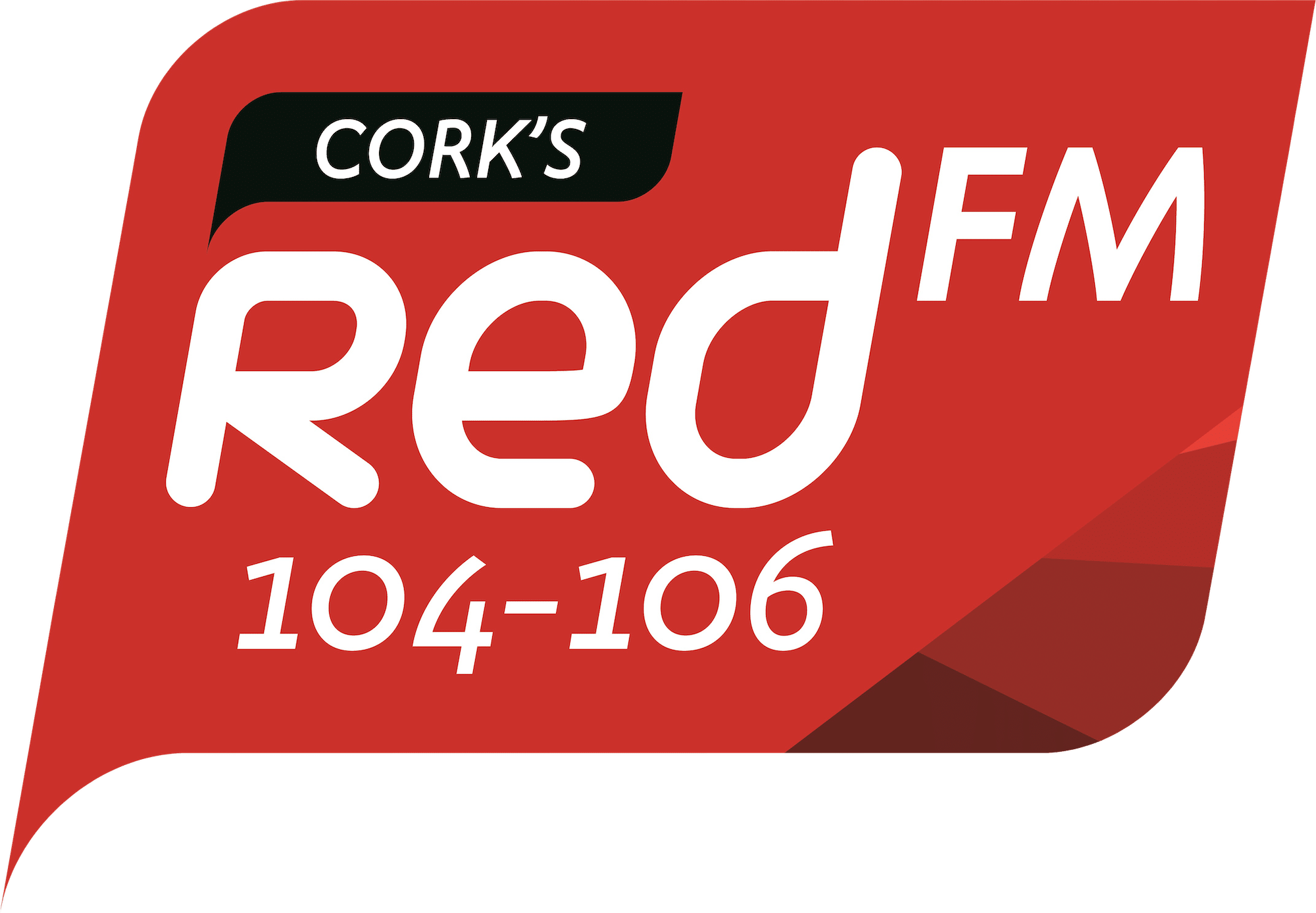
- Logo used from 2014 till 2024

County Cork; Ireland
- Frequency: 104.2–106.1 MHz
- RDS: RedFM

Programming
- Languages: English, Irish
- Format: Adult contemporary

Ownership
- Owner: Bauer Media Audio
- Sister stations: Today FM; Newstalk; Dublin's 98FM; SPIN 1038; SPIN South West; iRadio

History
- First air date: 16 January 2002

Links
- Website: www.redfm.ie

Cork's RedFM is an Irish radio station which broadcasts to Cork and the surrounding area, and is aimed at a youth audience. The station commenced broadcasting on 16 January 2002" and was awarded Ireland's first youth radio licence. Its target market is the 15-35 age group in Cork city and county.

On 1 March 2023, the radio station was acquired by Bauer Media Audio and became one of the group's stations in the country. It adopted a new branding kit in early 2024, to closer align with sister stations across the Bauer network. This included a new tagline, Cork's Good Times, taken from the network's similarly formatted 98FM in Dublin from 2022 to 2025.

== History ==
Some of RedFM's key personnel had previously worked at Atlantic 252 which ceased broadcasting on Thursday 20 December 2001. RedFM's first Chief Executive, The late Cork native Henry Condon (known on air as Henry Owens) and Charlie Wolf, a Boston native, had both been well known voices on Atlantic 252.

Adrian Bodenham was Red FM's Production Director at launch, and moved to Ireland to join the team from the UK's Virgin Radio. The station has picked up 13 PPI Radio Awards since first broadcasting, including winning the "Best Breakfast Show" award two years in a row, in 2008 and 2009.

In 2014 the station signed up a well known Cork Presenter Neil Prendeville. Neil had previously been a staple of rival local station Cork's 96FM. Listenership to RedFM has improved since the transfer.

In December 2017, a sale was agreed of the 17.5% of Red FM owned by Landmark Media Investments to The Irish Times pending regulatory approval. In July 2018, the 17.5% stake in the station to The Irish Times was complete.

In November 2022, the station reached a deal for acquisition by Bauer Media Audio, completed in March 2023. The acquisition resulted in sweeping changes to the station's weekday and weekend schedules, with the resignation of many veteran presenters. The station has since adopted a new branding kit shared by stations across the Bauer network in Ireland, including the tagline from similarly formatted 98FM in Dublin. The station also regularly features cross-promoted competitions from across Bauer stations under a local moniker.

In July 2023, the station saw the departure of both its afternoon and drivetime veteran presenters, Philip Bourke and Dave MacArdle, who had each worked at the station for over 20 years. They both later joined milt- city station Ireland's Classic Hits Radio (where they operate as cover presenters) . Their departure was quickly followed by weekend presenter Isabel Bartak-Healy, leaving for rival station Cork's 96FM after 12 years. The next month saw the return of Keith Cunningham to host a new flagship Breakfast show, following the station cutting their working relationship with local Olympian Rob Heffernan and comedian Laura O'Mahony.

== Business ==
Siteridge Limited currently hold a licence from the Broadcasting Authority of Ireland for Cork City and County and broadcast as Red FM. Shareholders in Siteridge Limited included Thomas Crosbie Holdings. Thomas Crosbie Holdings went into receivership in March 2013. Their stake acquired by Landmark Media Investments.

In March 2013, Dublin born Diarmuid O'Leary, the then Advertising Sales Director of the Irish Daily Star, joined RedFM as CEO.

== News ==
RedFM's Head of News is female, and all newsreaders are female, with the exception of some male sports readers who occasionally read news.

In early 2024, the station's weekend local news bulletins except for sport news were axed, with Red FM now airing network news bulletins from Newstalk.

== Frequencies ==
Cork's RedFM frequencies
Frequency (MHz)	Transmitter	Service area	Power (kW)
104.2	Carrigaline	Carrigaline and Cobh	0.1
104.5	Nowen Hill	West Cork	8.5
105.0 (inactive)	Newmarket	Newmarket	0.5
105.1	Youghal	Youghal	0.1
105.2	Kinsale	Kinsale	0.2
105.4	Bantry	Bantry	0.2
105.4	Fermoy	Fermoy	0.2
105.7	Corran Mountain	North Cork	2.5
106.1	Hollyhill	Cork City and SE Cork	2.0
