= Liz Reddy =

Irish television and radio personality

- Occupations: Television and radio personality

Liz Reddy is an Irish television and radio personality, known for her work as Head of News at WLR FM, one of Ireland's most successful local radio stations, and her shows on Waterford @ 8, a now-defunct local television station run by the staff of WLR FM.

== Waterford @ 8 / City Channel ==
WLR FM staff used to run a local television station, "Waterford @ 8", on which Reddy presented a programme; the channel closed due to lack of financial viability. City Channel's Waterford Report was first presented by WLR FM's Aoibhin Fallon, a member of the news team at WLR FM who later co-presented the Timmy Ryan Breakfast Show on WLR FM. Colleagues Janice Corrigan from WLR FM News and Mary O' Neill from Beat 102 103 News present Waterford Report on City Channel.

== Awards ==
Reddy was nominated for the Champagne Nicholas Feuillatte Women of the Year Award. She has won a Phonographic Performance Ireland (PPI) award for her documentary "Confessions of an Exeter City Nut". In 2003, she placed second for the PPI's News Broadcaster of the Year Award.
