= Down Democrat =

Northern Irish newspaper

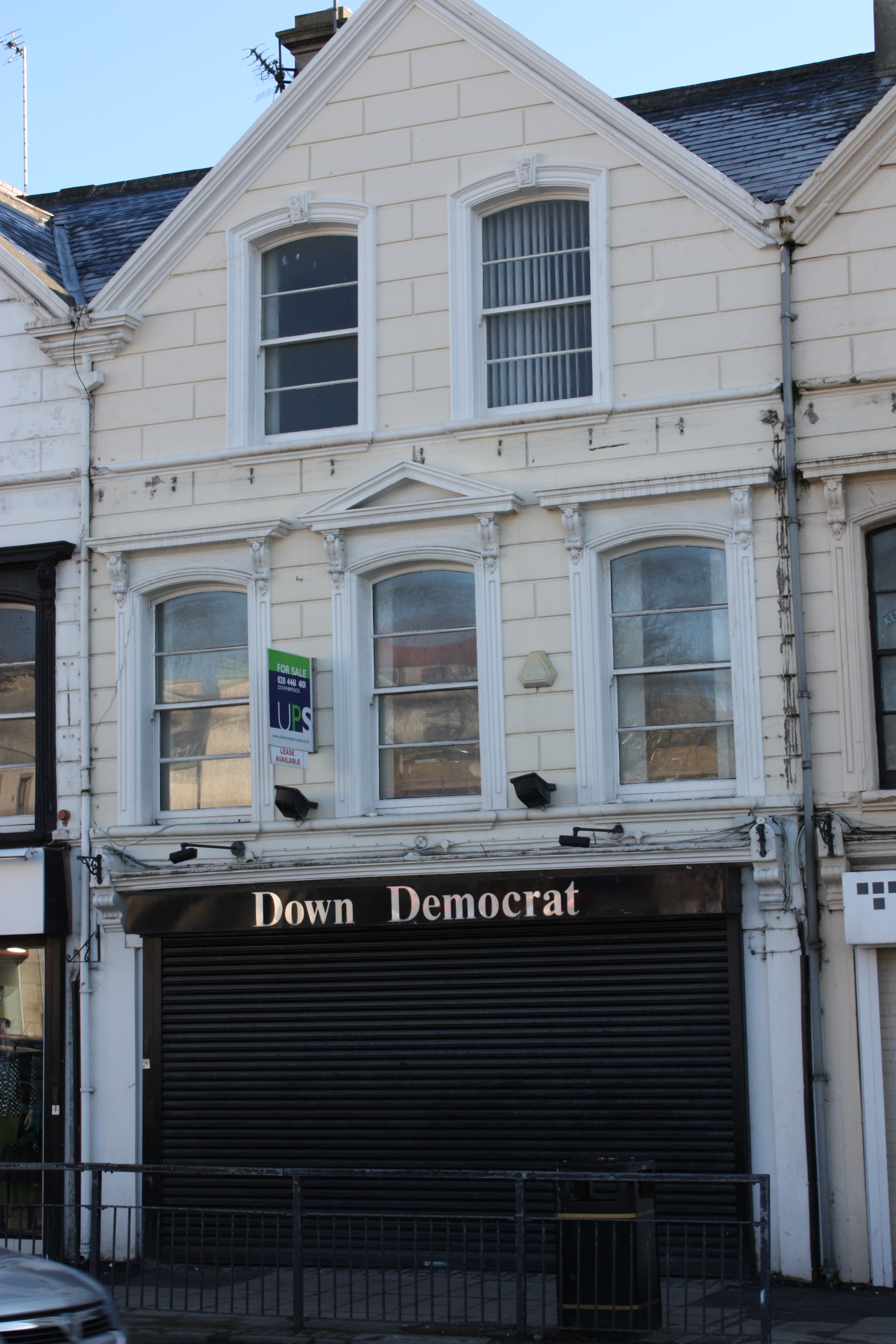
Down Democrat (former) office, Market Street, Downpatrick, February 2010

The Down Democrat was a weekly tabloid newspaper based in Downpatrick, County Down, Northern Ireland. It was published by Thomas Crosbie Holdings and then acquired by Alpha Newspaper Group.

It was closed down in 2011 (14 years ago).
