= Beat 102 103 =

Irish regional radio station

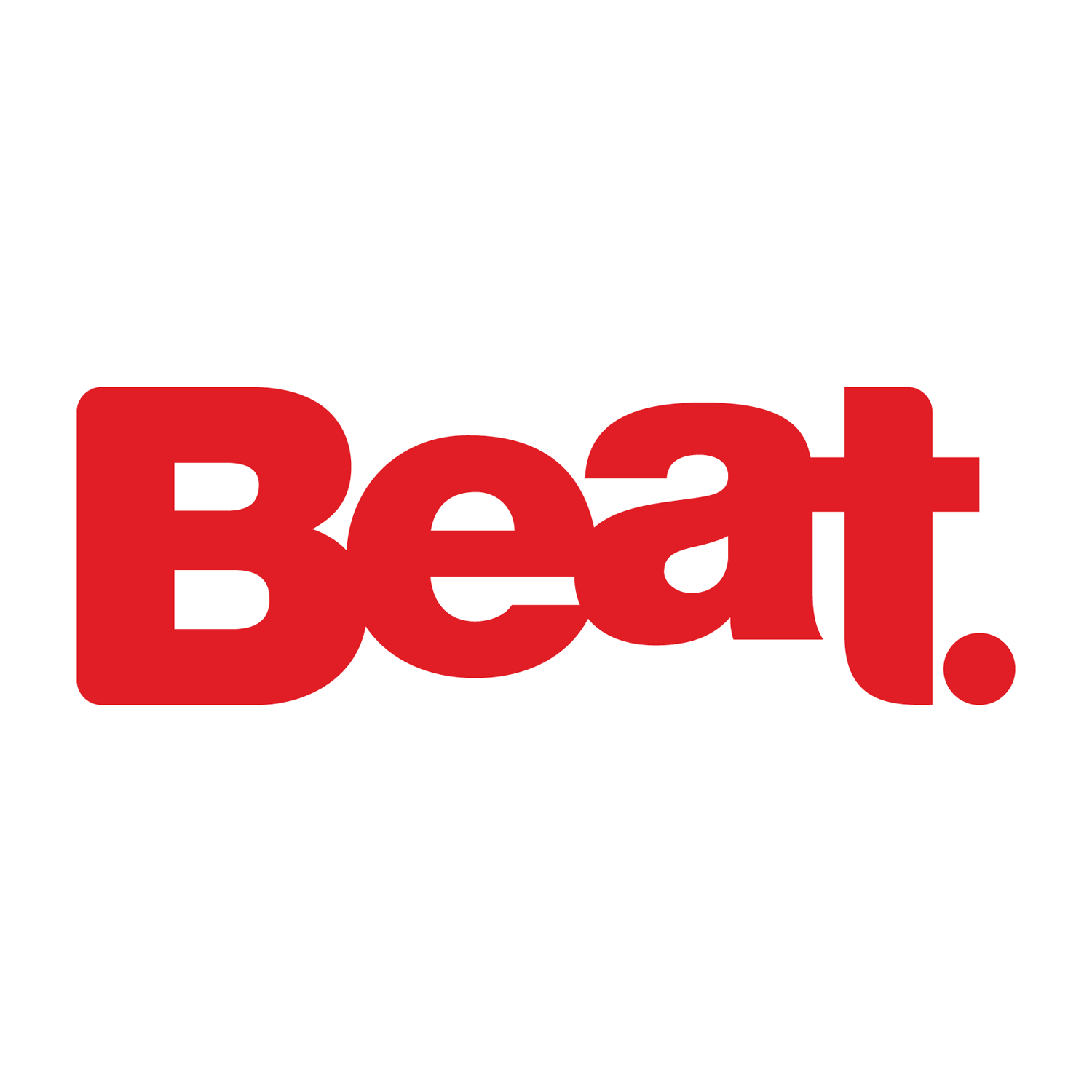
- Ireland
- Broadcast area: Counties Waterford, Carlow, Kilkenny, Wexford and Tipperary
- Frequency: 102.0 – 103.1 FM

Programming
- Language: English with dedicated Irish Language Chart Music programme
- Format: CHR

Ownership
- Owner: Bauer Media Audio Ireland
- Sister stations: Today FM; SPIN 1038 iRadio and all other Bauer Media Audio Ireland stations

History
- First air date: Tuesday 1 July 2003

Links
- Webcast: Play
- Website: beat102103.com

Beat 102 103 is an independent regional radio station in Ireland licensed by Coimisiún na Meán covering counties Waterford, Carlow, Kilkenny, Wexford and Tipperary in the south-east of the country. It began broadcasting on 1 July 2003 from studios at The Broadcast Centre, Ardkeen, Waterford (shared with Waterford station WLR FM), becoming the first station to operate under a regional licence.

The station is a Top 40 Hit/CHR station aimed at listeners aged between 15 and 35. The main presenters on Beat are Niall Power, Shonagh Lyons, Michelle Heffernan, Darren Rice and Kirsten Matte Maher, Ava Sommers and Lydia Des Dollas .

On 13 April 2007, Cork-based Thomas Crosbie Holdings (TCH) announced it had acquired 75% ownership of both Beat 102 103 and WLR FM, in a deal worth a combined €14 million with WLR FM managing director Des Whelan keeping 25% of each. TCH already had a media presence in the South East, owning several newspapers in the region.

Thomas Crosbie Holdings went into receivership in March 2013. The 75% stake was acquired by Landmark Media Investments.

In December 2017, a sale was agreed to The Irish Times pending regulatory approval. In July 2018, the sale of the station to The Irish Times was complete.

A second stream, Noughty Beats, was launched in 2018. On 22 March 2024, Bauer Media Audio Ireland agreed to acquire Beat 102–103. The deal was finalised on 1 August 2024.

In 2024 Beat 102 103 was awarded the Outstanding Achievement Award at the annual IMRO National Radio Awards for Outstanding Achievement for their Digital Media Literacy initiative.

== Beat News and Beat Sport ==
News and Sport bulletins are at 10 to the hour from 06.50 'till 18.50 daily, with a 10-minute Beat News Roundup broadcast at 12.30. At 19.50, 20.50, 21.50, 23.30 and 01.00 on weekdays, "The Juicy Bits", a news, showbiz and weather bulletin is also broadcast.

=== The News & Sport Team ===
- Aoife Kearns
- Jesse Maher
- Rachael Dunphy
- Jayde Maher
- Kyle Butler
- Odran Johnson

== Frequencies ==
Frequency	Transmitter
102.0 MHz	Mount Leinster
102.2 MHz	Dungarvan
102.4 MHz	Clonmel
102.6 MHz	Gorey
102.8 MHz	Carrickpherish
103.1 MHz	Forth Mountain
103.1 MHz	Carrick-on-Suir
