= Tim Graham =

Tim or Timothy Graham may refer to:

- Tim Graham (sports journalist), American sports journalist
- Tim Graham (TV producer) (1958–2015), British journalist, television presenter and producer
- Tim Graham (athlete) (born 1939), British sprinter
- Tim Graham (Home and Away), a fictional character from the Australian soap opera Home and Away
- Tim Graham, director of media analysis at the Media Research Center
