= R. M. "Bertie" Smyllie =

Robert Maire Smyllie
- Born: March 20, 1893; Hill Street, Shettleston, Glasgow, Scotland
- Died: September 11, 1954 (aged 61); Dublin, Ireland
- Education: Sligo Grammar School
- Alma mater: Trinity College Dublin
- Occupations: Journalist; newspaper editor
- Spouse: Kathlyn Reid (m. 1925)
- Writing career
- Pen name: Nichevo
- Language: English
- Years active: 1920–1954
- Period: 1920–1954
- Genre: Journalism
- Subjects: Politics; social commentary; cultural history
- Notable awards: Order of the White Lion (Czechoslovakia, 1939)

Robert Maire Smyllie (20 March 1893 – 11 September 1954), known as Bertie Smyllie, was editor of The Irish Times from 1934 until his death in 1954.

== Biography ==
=== Early life ===
Robert Maire Smyllie was born on 20 March 1893 at Hill Street, Shettleston, Glasgow in Scotland. He was the eldest of four sons and one daughter of Robert Smyllie, a Presbyterian printer originally from Scotland who was working in Sligo town at the time, and Elisabeth Follis, originally from Cork. His father had married in Sligo on 20 July 1892 and later became proprietor and editor of the unionist Sligo Times. Smyllie attended Sligo Grammar School in 1906 and enrolled at Trinity College Dublin (TCD) in 1911.

=== Journalist ===
After two years at TCD, Smyllie’s desire for adventure led him to leave university in 1913. Working as a vacation tutor to an American boy in Germany at the start of World War I, he was detained in Ruhleben internment camp, near Berlin, during the war. As an internee, he was involved in drama productions with other internees. Following his release at the end of the war, Smyllie witnessed the German revolution of 1918–1919; during this period, he encountered revolutionary sailors from Kiel who temporarily made him a representative of the Workers’ and Soldiers’ Council, and he observed key events including the looting of the Kaiser’s Palace and violent clashes between rival factions in Berlin. It was also in this period that Smyllie secured a personal interview with Lloyd George at the Paris Peace Conference. This helped Smyllie gain a permanent position with the Irish Times in 1920, where he quickly earned the confidence of editor John Healy. Together, they took part in secret but unsuccessful attempts to resolve the Irish War of Independence.

Smyllie contributed to the Irishman's Diary column of the paper from 1927. In 1927, he published an exclusive report outlining a draft government including both Labour and Fianna Fáil TDs, signalling the volatile politics of the early state years.

Smyllie’s knowledge of languages (particularly the German he had learned during his internment) led to numerous foreign assignments. His reports on the rise of National Socialism in 1930s Germany were notably prescient and instilled in him a lasting antipathy towards the movement.

=== Editor of the Irish Times ===
When Healy died in 1934, Smyllie became editor of the Irish Times and also took on the role of Irish correspondent for The Times (London), a position that brought significant additional income. Under Healy’s leadership, the Irish Times shifted from representing the Anglo-Irish ascendancy to becoming an organ of liberal, southern unionism, and eventually became a critical legitimising force in the Irish Free State. Smyllie enthusiastically supported this change. Smyllie established a non-partisan profile and a modern Irish character for the erstwhile ascendancy paper; for example, he dropped "Kingstown Harbour" for "Dún Laoghaire". He also introduced the paper's first-ever Irish-language columnist. Smyllie was assisted by Alec Newman and Lionel Fleming, recruited Patrick Campbell and enlisted Flann O'Brien to write his thrice-weekly column "Cruiskeen Lawn" as Myles na gCopaleen. As editor, Smyllie introduced a more Bohemian and informal style, establishing a semi-permanent salon in Fleet Street’s Palace Bar. This became a hub for journalists and literary figures and a source of material for his weekly column, Nichevo.

One of Smyllie’s early political challenges as editor concerned the Spanish Civil War. At a time when Irish Catholic opinion was strongly pro-Franco, Smyllie ensured the Irish Times coverage was balanced and fair, though advertiser pressure eventually forced the withdrawal of the paper’s young reporter, Lionel Fleming, from the conflict. Smyllie’s awareness of the looming European crisis earned him the Order of the White Lion of Czechoslovakia in 1939. However, during the Second World War, Smyllie clashed with Ireland’s censorship authorities, especially under Minister Frank Aiken. Smyllie challenged their views both publicly and privately, though his relationship with the editor of the Irish Independent, Frank Geary, was cold, reducing the effectiveness of their joint opposition to censorship.

During the 1943 Irish general election, Smyllie used the paper to promote the idea of a national government that could represent Ireland with authority in the postwar world. He praised Fine Gael’s proposal for such a government and criticised Éamon de Valera for dismissing it as unrealistic. This led to a public exchange between de Valera and Smyllie, with the latter defending the Irish Times’ role as a constructive voice for Ireland's future rather than a partisan interest.

Following the war, Smyllie’s editorial stance shifted towards defending Ireland’s neutrality and diplomatic position. When Winston Churchill accused de Valera of fraternising with Axis powers, Smyllie countered by revealing Ireland’s covert collaboration with the Allies, such as military and intelligence cooperation, despite official neutrality. In the same period, Smyllie continued to oppose censorship, particularly the frequent banning of Irish writers by the Censorship of Publications Board. This opposition featured prominently in a controversy on the Irish Times letters page in 1950, later published as the liberal ethic. The paper also adopted a critical stance towards the Catholic Church, notably during the 1951 resignation of Minister for Health Noël Browne amid opposition from bishops and doctors to a national Mother and Child Scheme. Smyllie’s editorials suggested the Catholic Church was effectively the government of Ireland, though he maintained a cordial relationship with Archbishop John Charles McQuaid, who invited him annually for dinner.

Smyllie was also wary of American foreign policy, showing hostility particularly during the Korean War. American diplomats in Dublin alleged that Smyllie was "pro-communist". Despite growing readership among an educated Catholic middle class, the Irish Times’ circulation in 1950 remained under 50,000, far below the Irish Independent and the Fianna Fáil-aligned Irish Press.

== Final years ==
In later years, Smyllie’s health declined, prompting a quieter lifestyle. He moved from his large house in Pembroke Park, Dublin, to Delgany, County Wicklow. As he did not drive, he became less present in the newspaper office in D’Olier Street, contributing to a decline in the paper’s dynamism. His health deteriorated further, resulting in frequent absences from his editorial duties, though he retained his position despite management attempts to limit his authority, especially over finances. Robert Smyllie died of heart failure on 11 September 1954.

== Personal life ==
In 1925, Smyllie married Kathlyn Reid, eldest daughter of a County Meath landowner. They had no children.

Smyllie hit his tee shots with a nine iron, spoke in a curious mix of Latin phrases and everyday Dublin slang, and cycled to work wearing a green sombrero.
