= Western People =

Irish newspaper

- Type: Weekly newspaper
- Format: Tabloid (broadsheet until 2013)
- Owner: The Irish Times
- Editor: James Laffey
- Founded: 1883
- Political alignment: Central
- Headquarters: Ballina, County Mayo
- Website: westernpeople.ie/

The Western People is a weekly local newspaper published in Ballina, County Mayo in Ireland. It was first published in 1883.

The newspaper was part of the Thomas Crosbie Holdings group. Thomas Crosbie Holdings went into receivership in March 2013. The newspaper was acquired by Landmark Media Investments. In December 2017, a sale was agreed to The Irish Times pending regulatory approval; in July 2018, this sale was completed.

The Ballina Herald newspaper (1844 – 28 April 1962), later named Ballina Herald and Mayo and Sligo Advertiser, merged with the Western People in or around 1962.

According to the Audit Bureau of Circulations, it had an average weekly circulation of 18,242 in 2008 (ABC Jan-Dec 2008; 12 month figure). Circulation fell to 13,236 for 2012.

== See also ==
- John Healy
