= John Cunningham (journalist) =

John Cunningham (June 1945 – 8 February 2012) an Irish journalist from Salthill, Galway (originally from Tuam, County Galway). He was national journalist of the year in 1979. He was editor of the Waterford News & Star from 1982 to 1984 and editor of the Connacht Tribune from 1984 to 2007. Cunningham was also a journalism lecturer in National University of Ireland, Galway. He was awarded an honorary MA in 2006 by NUIG.

He was married to his wife, Nuala, with whom he had four sons - Shane, Ivor, Gary and Enda. He died in 2012 following a battle with cancer.
