= Thomas Bleakley McDowell =

Irish businessman (1923–2009)

Chief Executive of The Irish Times
- In office 1962–1997

Personal details
- Born: Thomas Bleakley McDowell; May 18, 1923 Belfast, Northern Ireland
- Died: September 15, 2009 (aged 86) Dublin, Ireland
- Spouse: Margaret Telfer
- Children: 2
- Education: Royal Belfast Academical Institution
- Alma mater: Queen's University Belfast
- Occupation: Newspaper executive

Military service
- Allegiance: United Kingdom
- Branch/service: British Army
- Years of service: 1942–1955
- Rank: Major
- Unit: Royal Inniskilling Fusiliers; Royal Ulster Rifles
- Battles/wars: Second World War

Thomas Bleakley McDowell, often called T. B. McDowell, or simply "the Major" (18 May 1923 – 9 September 2009), was an officer in the British Army, an MI5 agent and subsequently chief executive of The Irish Times for nearly 40 years.

== Early life ==
Born in Belfast on 18 May 1923, Thomas Bleakley McDowell was the only child of Thomas McDowell, a clerk originally based on the Antrim Road and later of Upper Jordanstown, and his wife Violet (née Hardy) from Dundalk, County Louth. The family were Protestant members of the Church of Ireland and identified politically as unionists. His upbringing was financially constrained due to his father's chronic lung condition, the result of being gassed in the first World War; his father died in 1944.

McDowell attended a local primary school on the Antrim Road before winning a scholarship to the Royal Belfast Academical Institution, where he completed his education in 1941 as the Second World War continued. Although he initially wished to enlist in the British army, he respected his parents' wishes and postponed doing so. He spent a year studying commerce at Queen's University but remained uncertain about his long-term direction.

In 1942, he enlisted in the Royal Inniskilling Fusiliers and was commissioned in 1943. He later transferred to the Royal Ulster Rifles, beginning the military career that shaped the next phase of his life.

== Military career ==
During officer training in 1943, McDowell suffered a knee injury, which made him ineligible for active service. Treated at a hospital in Bangor, County Down, by the physiotherapist Margaret Telfer, he later married her in 1947. The injury redirected his wartime duties, and he served as a weapons instructor and inspector at Omagh, County Tyrone, for the remainder of the conflict. After the war, he obtained a regular commission in the Royal Ulster Rifles. He was posted to occupied Austria, where he served in Vienna on joint patrols with Russian, American and French officers. By December 1947, he had been promoted to captain. He was then granted leave to complete his university studies, returning to Queen's University and graduating with a law degree in 1950.

In 1951, he was called to the English bar after a summer of intensive legal study and subsequently rejoined the British army. Extra-regimental postings followed in Edinburgh and, from 1951, in the Judge Advocates Office in London. His legal training led to his transfer into the army legal service at the War Office, where promotion prospects were limited. He retired from the army with the rank of major in 1955, reportedly having undertaken some work for MI5 during this period.

Facing the likelihood of overseas postings that would separate him from his young family, he left military service and accepted a position as a legal adviser with James North Ltd, a London-based manufacturer of protective clothing. Lacking direct industry experience, he initially sought a managerial role to familiarise himself with the company’s operations. The company suggested a management position in its operations in Dublin. He slotted easily into the city's old business establishment, joining the Kildare Street Club, becoming a director of Pim's department store, and setting his career firmly on a commercial rather than a legal path.

== The Irish Times ==
His involvement with newspapers came about through the recognition of his business acumen. He was asked by some acquaintances to take a look at the financial troubles of the Evening Mail, which was bought subsequently by The Irish Times, adding to the latter's own financial difficulties.

He was asked later by The Irish Times to see if Roy Thomson, the Canadian-born British press baron whom he had met while they both looked separately at the Evening Mail, might be interested in taking it over. Thomson passed, and the company then asked McDowell himself to take charge as chief executive in 1962.

Among his first actions was to close the Evening Mail and the Sunday Review, a short-lived tabloid that was ahead of its time. A year later, another problem was resolved when Douglas Gageby, who had been hired as managing director of The Irish Times shortly before McDowell's arrival, took over as editor.

=== Relationship with Douglas Gageby ===
Thus, what had begun as a slightly awkward relationship turned into a highly successful partnership as Gageby set about broadening the newspaper's editorial appeal and McDowell set it on a successful commercial course.

McDowell always credited Gageby and his successors as editors with the success of the newspaper, pointing out in an interview last year for the newspaper's archives that "people buy the paper to see what the editor has said, not to know how it is printed or what kind of paper is used".

Although he had a close relationship with editors, especially Gageby, he did not interfere in the editorial running of the newspaper. He did not share Gageby's republicanism but believed that the minority in the North had been treated badly by the majority.

When the North erupted in violence in 1969 - a time when there was little or no real communication between nationalists and unionists or between Irish and British politicians and bureaucrats - he tried on his initiative to interest the then British prime minister, Harold Wilson, in talks with all the other parties involved.

His efforts came to nothing but irritated the then British ambassador to Dublin, Sir Andrew Gilchrist, whom he had bypassed.

In a briefing letter about McDowell's approach, Gilchrist wrote that McDowell had described Gageby as "on Northern questions a renegade or white nigger". McDowell strongly denied the charge when Gilchrist's letter was published in 2003: "I never used that phrase, nor would I have thought of using it, about Gageby," he said in last year's interview. "Other people (in Belfast) called him a renegade, but I never thought he was a renegade. Douglas never made any secret of what he was. There could be no doubt about him turning or changing or anything like that."

=== The Irish Times Trust ===
By the early 1970s, the circulation of The Irish Times had almost doubled in a decade to 60,000, and it was making money. Some of the directors indicated an interest in selling the company, and McDowell proposed instead that it be turned into a trust. It was a period when several newspapers in Ireland and Britain had changed hands or were seen as being vulnerable to takeovers.

He aimed to protect the newspaper's independence, make it as difficult as possible for anyone to take over, and formalise its aims in a guiding trust.

McDowell's primary interest in the arrangements was in drawing up the terms of the trust, using his legal expertise and drawing on a wide range of media models including the Guardian, the Observer, the Economist magazine, and the New York Times as well as other documents ranging from the Constitution to the American Declaration of Independence.

He worked on the trust document for many months, going through 28 drafts before he was satisfied with the result. Among the issues he had to consider was the mechanism for appointing trustees: various options which would allow public bodies or interests to name members were considered but ruled out because of fears that the appointments would become politicised.

He eventually opted to appoint them himself, with the help of each one selected to appoint others. When he had finished the draft trust document, he showed it to Gageby, who suggested that a proviso requiring the newspaper to reflect minority views be included, which it was.

The five directors of the company, including McDowell and Gageby, transferred their shares in the company to a solicitor in the autumn of 1973 in anticipation of announcing the trust at the end of that year.

Further delays in finalising the trust terms resulted in its announcement in April 1974, on the eve of the introduction of capital gains tax.

The timing gave rise to suggestions that the directors were taking their cash (£325,000 each) out of the company before the new tax took effect.

McDowell always denied that this was the case, maintaining that the timing was coincidental: he was also adamant that the motivation behind the formation of the trust itself was altruistic. The formation of the trust left the newspaper with a large bank debt, used to buy out the directors/shareholders, at what turned out to be a difficult economic period after the first oil crisis hit the Western world in the autumn of 1974. McDowell successfully guided The Irish Times' financial fortunes through the subsequent recession and into further periods of growth throughout the 1980s and 1990s.

He stood down as chief executive of the company in 1997 and retired from the chairmanship of The Irish Times Trust in 2001: he was given the title President for Life in recognition of his huge contribution to the newspaper.;

During his visit to the new Irish Times offices on Tara Street in June 2008 for the unveiling of a portrait of him by Andrew Festing, he described the newspaper and his family as the two loves of his life.

== Personal life ==
His wife, Margaret, died in 1992.
