= The Echo (Cork) =

Irish morning newspaper based in Cork

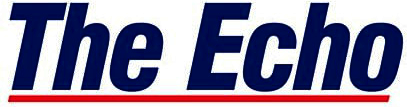
- Type: Daily morning newspaper
- Format: Tabloid
- Owner: The Irish Times
- Editor: Maurice Gubbins
- Founded: 1892 (as the Evening Echo)
- Political alignment: Populist
- Headquarters: Assumption Road, Blackpool, Cork
- Website: echolive.ie

The Echo, formerly known as the Evening Echo, is an Irish morning newspaper based in Cork. It is distributed throughout the province of Munster, although it is primarily read in its base city of Cork. The newspaper was founded as a broadsheet in 1892, and has been published in tabloid format since 1991.

The newspaper was part of the Thomas Crosbie Holdings group, and 'sister paper' to the group's Irish Examiner (formerly the Cork Examiner). Thomas Crosbie Holdings went into receivership in March 2013. The newspaper was acquired by Landmark Media Investments, which in turn was sold to The Irish Times in 2018.

Unlike the Irish Examiner, which is now a national daily, The Echo's focus is on local news.

The Echo is published daily except Sunday.

== History ==
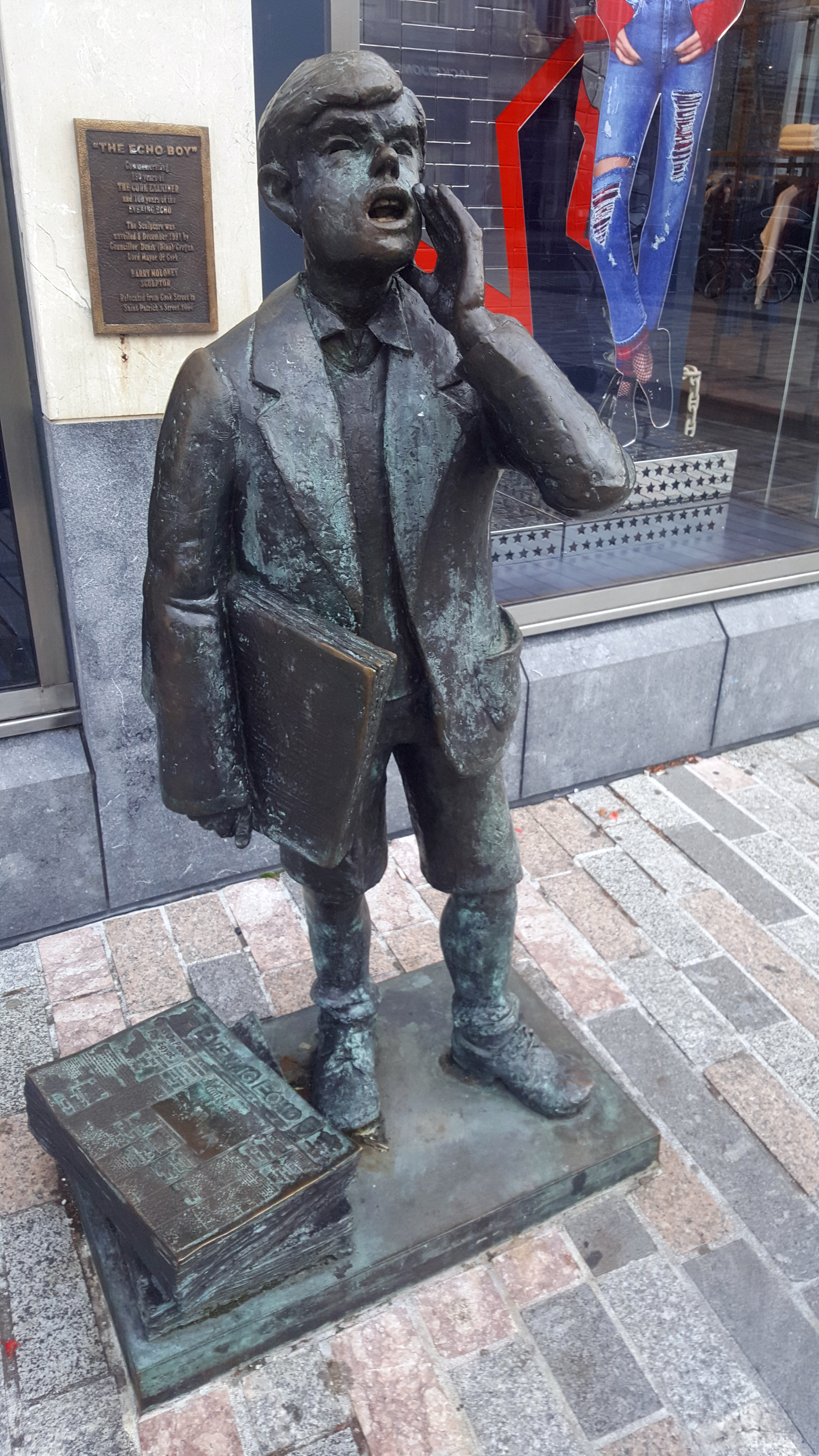
Echo Boy statue, Cork City

Echo seller with distinctive cry

The Evening Echo was first published in 1892. It was launched as an evening paper by Thomas Crosbie, then proprietor of the Cork Examiner. Crosbie had himself joined the Examiner in 1841, taking over as editor—and later owner—after the death of founder John Francis Maguire in 1871. The newspaper remained in the hands of the Crosbie family until the 21st century.

The presses used by the Examiner and Echo printed the First National Loan for the Sinn Féin Finance Minister Michael Collins in 1919, leading to the British authorities' briefly shutting down the paper. The I.R.A damaged the printing presses in 1920, and they were destroyed by the anti-Treaty I.R.A. in 1922.

For decades the Evening Echo had been connected to the "Echo Boys", who were poor and often homeless children that sold the newspaper.

The title was sold in July 2018, along with other assets of Landmark Media Investments, to The Irish Times group.

In January 2019, it was announced that in March 2019 the Evening Echo would rebrand as The Echo and change from an evening newspaper to a morning newspaper.

== Affiliations ==
The Echo has a number of affiliations, including in sporting and cultural circles. The newspaper is the official sponsor of the Cork Senior Hurling Championship, as well as media sponsor of Feis Maitiú Corcaigh. The Cork International Choral Festival is also supported by the newspaper.

== Circulation ==
Average circulation was approximately 30,000 copies per issue in 1990, 28,000 by 1999, had decreased to 24,000 by 2009, and was approximately 8,000 by the end of 2019.

Year (period)	Average circulation per issue
1990 (January to December)	30,525
1999 (January to June)	27,914
2006 (January to June)	27,085
2008 (January to June)	25,829
2009 (January to June)	24,192
2010 (January to June)	22,288
2011 (January to June)	20,011
2012 (January to June)	17,556
2012 (July to December)	16,560
2013 (July to December)	14,147
2014 (January to June)	13,787
2014 (July to December)	13,110
2015 (January to June)	12,278
2015 (July to December)	11,534
2016 (January to June)	10,976
2016 (July to December)	10,270
2017 (January to June)	9,880
2017 (July to December)	9,449
2018 (January to June)	9,011
2018 (July to December)	8,559
2019 (January to June)	8,439
2019 (July to December)	8,081

In 2020, The Echo exited ABC circulation audits.
