= The Nationalist (Carlow) =

Irish regional newspaper

- Type: Weekly newspaper
- Format: Tabloid
- Owner: The Irish Times
- Editor: Conal O'Boyle
- Founded: 1883
- Political alignment: Nationalism
- Headquarters: Hanover House, Carlow
- Website: http://www.carlow-nationalist.ie/

The Nationalist is an Irish regional newspaper, published each Tuesday in Carlow. It has three comprehensive sections, containing news, sport and 'living' articles.

== History ==
The first edition of The Nationalist and Leinster Times was published on Browne Street, Carlow in 1883. It later moved to 58 Dublin Street and then to its offices Tullow Street, which the newspaper occupied until December 2005. Between the demise of The Carlow Sentinel in 1921 and the start of The Carlow People in 1996, The Nationalist was Carlow's sole regional newspaper. During the construction of the newspaper's new offices they used a space formerly occupied by a gym in Carlow Shopping Centre. The Nationalist moved into its new premises at Hanover House, Hanover, Carlow town, in early 2007.

The newspaper was part of the Thomas Crosbie Holdings group. Thomas Crosbie Holdings went into receivership in March 2013. The newspaper was acquired by Landmark Media Investments.

In December 2017, a sale was agreed to The Irish Times pending regulatory approval. In July 2018, the sale of the title to The Irish Times was complete.

Its current editor is Conal O'Boyle.

== Current features ==
=== News ===
- Around Carlow Town by Elizabeth Lee
- East-West Link by Suzanne Pender
- Godfrey's Gospel by Michael Godfrey
- Looking South by Michael Tracy
- Times Past by Frank White

=== Sport ===
- Carlow GAA Scene
- Pádraig Amond column on soccer
- Where are they now by Kieran Murphy
- Racing
- Tee to Green
- Reports and features on the Carlow and District Football League

=== Living ===
- Top of the Class, The Nationalist schools' page
- The Box Office, The Nationalist guide to arts and entertainment
- Night Town, all the latest social pictures

== Sister publications ==
The paper has regional variations, The Laois Nationalist, and The Kildare Nationalist.

== See also ==
- Brendan Murphy, columnist
