= Enniscorthy Echo =

Irish newspaper

- Type: Weekly local newspaper
- Format: Tabloid
- Editor: Tom Mooney (as of 2008)
- Founded: 1902
- Ceased publication: 2017
- Political alignment: Irish nationalist; Populist
- Language: English
- Headquarters: Slaney Place, Enniscorthy, County Wexford, Ireland
- Price: € 2 (as of 2008)

The Enniscorthy Echo was a local newspaper published once per week in County Wexford, Ireland. Founded in 1902, it folded in mid-2017.

== History ==
The newspaper was first published in 1902 from offices at Abbey Square, Enniscorthy, County Wexford. It was founded by the nationalist politicians William Sears and Sir Thomas Esmonde. In 1908, it moved its offices to Mill Park Road, Enniscorthy.

Originally known as the Echo and North Wexford and General Advertiser, it was later known as the Enniscorthy Echo and South Leinster Advertiser. Initially published on Fridays, the paper contained content in both English and Irish and, while it covered national and international news items, it mainly focused on local issues.

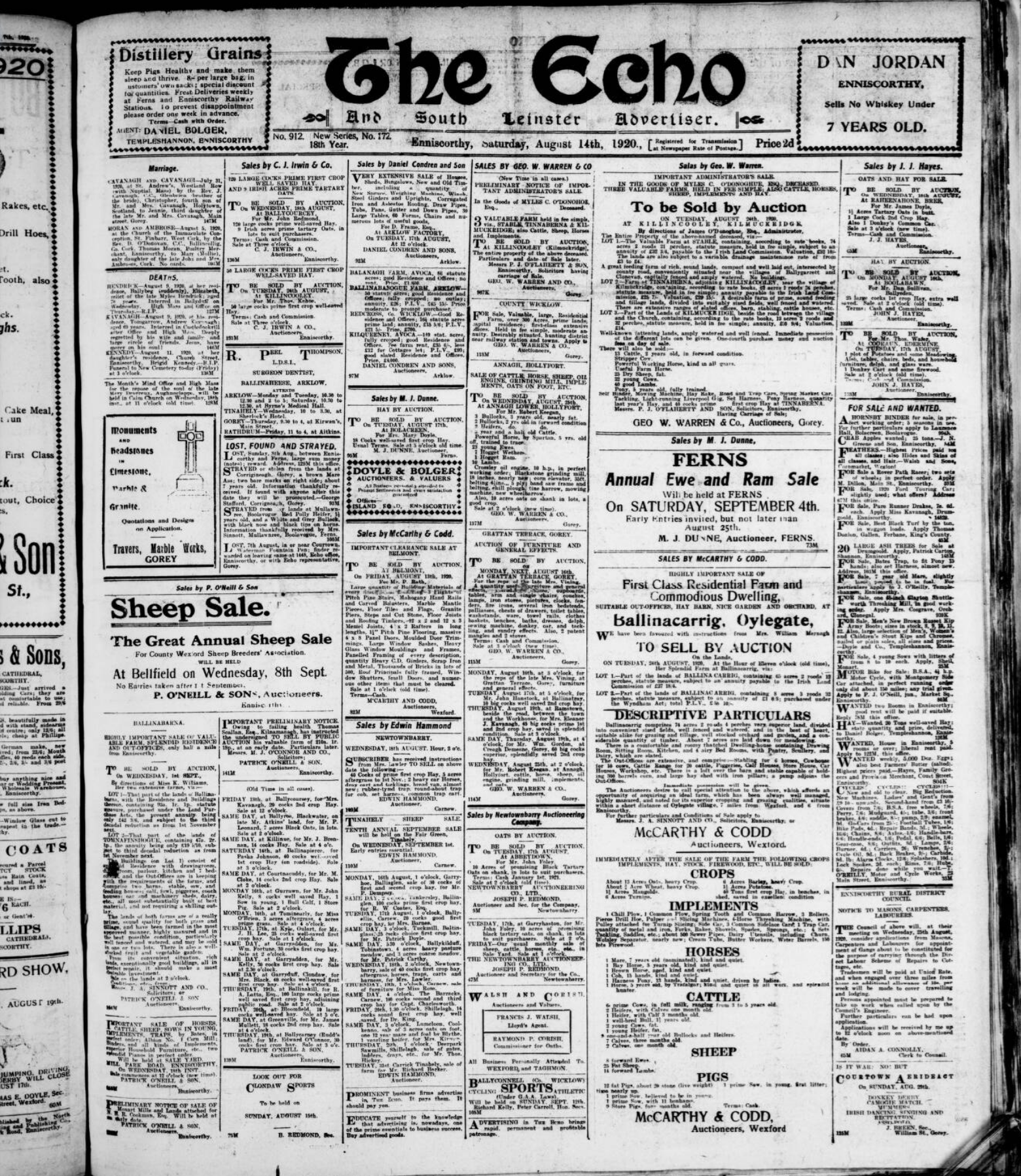
Frontpage of the Echo and South Leinster Advertiser, 14 August 1920

During the revolutionary period of the 1910s and 1920s, the newspaper was "one of the few openly Sinn Féin papers" prior to the 1916 Easter Rising. It was "suppressed" by the British authorities in 1916 and its editor, William Sears, was arrested. Remaining nationalist in its outlook, the Liberal MP Joseph Kenworthy suggested that, in 1921 during the Irish War of Independence, a local British military officer had "ordered" that the newspaper publish articles that were "advertisements by His Majesty's Government" and questioned whether the newspaper was "censored".

In the 1980s, the Enniscorthy Echo was placed into receivership before being bought by a local business family and "re-opened" in 1988.

The newspaper became part of the Thomas Crosbie Holdings group in 2006. In March 2008, the Enniscorthy Echo moved to new offices at Slaney Place in Enniscorthy. As of the early 21st century, the newspaper focused primarily on stories relating to Enniscorthy town and its surrounds, as well as those relating to County Wexford as a whole.

When Thomas Crosbie Holdings went into receivership in March 2013, the newspaper was acquired by Landmark Media Investments.

In mid-2017, a liquidator was appointed to the Wexford Echo Limited, a subsidiary of the Landmark Media Group which owned the Enniscorthy Echo. While it was reported at the time that the liquidator intended to keep the publications open, with the intent that "a buyer for the titles can be found", the Enniscorthy Echo subsequently closed.
