= Communications Clinic =

Irish communications and PR company

- Industry: Public relations
- Headquarters: Dublin, Ireland
- Key people: Terry Prone (Chairman), Anton Savage (Director), Eoghan T. McDermott (Managing Director)
- Website: communicationsclinic.ie

The Communications Clinic is an Irish communications company on Adelaide Road in Dublin, set up by former employees of Carr Communications. The company's work involves public relations, interview and media coaching.

== History ==
The company was set up by Terry Prone and Tom Savage. Many other staff from Carr joined the business, including Hilary Kenny, Anton Savage and Gerard Kenny. Tom Savage was formerly Chairman of the Board of RTÉ, having had an extensive career in public relations and media previously. Terry Prone is currently the chairperson of the company. In 2010, the company aimed to have over twenty employees.

== Clients ==
The Clinic's portfolio includes the Gaelic Players Association, over fifteen "major corporate clients", and Sinn Féin. In 2011 they worked with presidential election candidate Gay Mitchell and worked with Taoiseach Enda Kenny for his State of Nation Address.

== Controversy ==
In November 2011, The Communications Clinic was the subject of substantial media attention following the suicide of a former employee, Kate Fitzgerald. This came following an article printed in The Irish Times, under the pseudonym "Grace Ringwood", printed on 9 September 2011 where she detailed her struggle with depression and work. It later emerged, in an article written by Peter Murtagh, that by this stage she had already committed suicide.

Following the revelation that Kate Fitzgerald was an employee of the Clinic, the paper redacted the online version of her article. Editor Kevin O'Sullivan apologised to the Communications Clinic, stating "the original piece were not factual. It is clear that their publication was significantly damaging to the staff and management of her employer, the Communications Clinic". Following these events, Fitzgerald's parents said they felt "deeply hurt" by the paper's actions and a media debate ensued. The parents of Kate Fitzgerald brought a complaint to the ombudsman regarding the Irish Times article. The ombudsman upheld the complaint.
