= Strabane Weekly News and Tyrone & Donegal Reporter =

Irish newspaper

Logo of Strabane Weekly News & Tyrone and Donegal Reporter

The Strabane Weekly News and Tyrone & Donegal Reporter is a local paper published in the border town of Strabane, County Tyrone, Northern Ireland and covers the west of the county. The paper also covers the area of east Donegal in the Republic of Ireland, in particular the hinterland of the town of Lifford, which is located across the River Mourne, on the other side of the border, from Strabane. The paper sells well in Raphoe and in St Johnston. The publication is owned by the Alpha Newspaper Group and has a current circulation of 3,382.
