= Keith Cunningham =

Irish radio producer (born 1977)

Keith Cunningham or "K.C." (born 1977 or 1978) is an Irish radio presenter, producer and radio programmer.

After spending a number of years with Today FM in Dublin, and commuting each week, he left the station to return home to his family in Cork. After spending some time at Cork's Red FM, as of late 2021, Cunningham was presenter of "KC & Ross in the Morning" (previously "The KC Show" from 2017-2019) on Cork's 96FM. As of 2024, Cunningham was working with Today FM.

== Early career ==
Originally from Breaffy near Castlebar in County Mayo, Cunningham started his radio career with pirate station Kiss FM in the early 1990s. After studying in Dublin, he returned to County Mayo to launch the pirate station, Power FM.

Following roles with local radio stations MWR FM and Galway Bay FM, he joined Dublin's FM 104 in 2000. He remained at FM 104 until he transferred to the newly opened Cork's RedFM.

== Later career ==
Cunningham started at Cork's Red FM in 2002, presenting a late-night dance music show. In 2004, he moved to Red Drive from 5-7 pm weekdays and continued to present dance show formats.

In 2005, Cunningham took over The Red Rooster Breakfast Show on Red FM, initially presenting the show on his own. He later teamed up with co-host Mark Linehan ("Lenny from Blarney"). From 2007 until the end of the show in 2010, the show won several PPI radio awards, including "best breakfast show" in Ireland for 2008 and 2009. Cunningham also won "best regional DJ" at the 2008 Meteor Awards.

After working with Today FM in Dublin from 2010 to 2014, Cunningham returned to Cork's Red FM as part of an overhaul of the radio station. From 2014 he presented The KC Show alongside Jason Coughlan on that station.

Cunningham later left Red FM and moved to 96 FM, and presented The KC Show (later "KC & Ross in the Morning") from 2017 to 2023. Cork's Red FM announced that he was returning to the station in June 2023. He rejoined Today FM in early 2024.
