= Newry Democrat =

Northern Irish newspaper

The Newry Democrat is a full colour newspaper serving Newry, County Down, Northern Ireland. It was published by Thomas Crosbie Holdings and in 2010 was acquired by the Alpha Newspaper Group, owned by John Taylor, Baron Kilclooney.

In 2011, journalists on the paper voted to strike over forced redundancies.
