= Tim Graham (TV producer) =

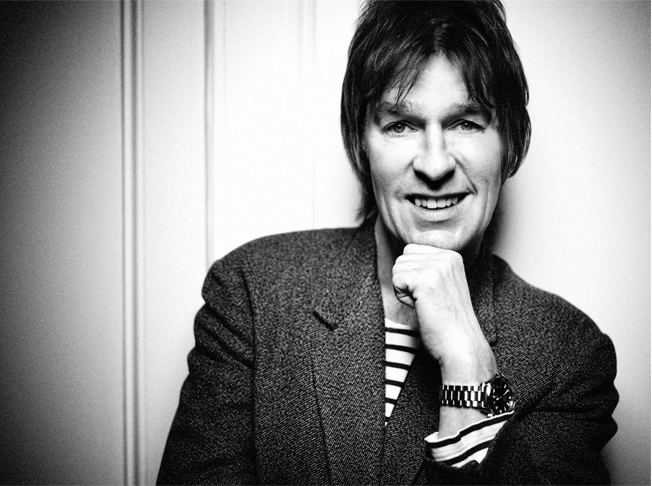
- Tim Graham
- Born: Timothy Graham; 1958; Holloway, Middlesex, United Kingdom
- Died: 6 September 2015 (aged 56–57)
- Years active: 1983–2015
- Notable work: Boiling Point
- Father: John Graham

Timothy Graham (1958 – 6 September 2015) was from Holloway, London of Irish/Scots parentage and the son of John Graham. In his own right, he was a British, RTS Award-winning TV Producer, journalist, former television presenter, chairman and founder of Soho-based Fin London.

== Television career ==
Graham began his TV career as a researcher on ITV show Number 73 (1983–1984) and became its music associate (1985). He worked on two series of Tyne Tees' The Tube, before becoming presenter on Channel 4's BAFTA-winning Wired (1988), working with artists including Elton John, Miles Davis, Paul Weller, Nina Simone, Johnny Cash, Al Green and Iggy Pop.

He also co-devised BBC Children's series What's That Noise!, which won a Royal Television Society Children's Entertainment Award in 1992.

In 1997, Graham was promoted to deputy editor of cable and satellite channel Granada Talk TV.

At LWT, Graham executive-produced shows including Gordon Ramsay's Beyond Boiling Point (2000), having produced the chef's first television series Boiling Point (1999), including its pilot episode for Channel 4.

In early 2001, Graham was promoted to Deputy Managing Director of LWT's digital unit The Lab - having formed its start-up team as Head of Development. He headed-up shows including The End of the Week Show, a topical discussion programme with Mariella Frostrup and created the first series of ITV's The Borough, which was awarded special commendation by the ITC.

Later producing work included A Place in the Sun and, at his own production company, exec'ing the lead episode of Megafactories Series 5 for National Geographic Channel which aired in over 66 countries worldwide.

== Music Journalism & Writing career ==
Graham began his media career as an Arts/Music writer for pop culture magazines including BLITZ, Melody Maker and Hot Press. For radio, he produced the Radio 1 Doing the Business documentary 'The Glass Ceiling', about women in the music business.

Graham wrote poetry for a number of audio books, including Cricket: A Sport in Verse which features his work Mantra of the Beast and Beirut Wedding Poem.

== Voiceover career ==
Graham voiced a number of commercials, including Guerlain for ITV, Rimmel and Siemens.
