= John Graham (journalist) =

- Born: 10 October 1926; Omagh, Northern Ireland
- Died: 4 August 1974 (aged 47); Biarritz, France
- Writing career
- Language: Journalist

John Graham (1926–1974) was a Northern Irish IPC-commended journalist who wrote for numerous British regional and national newspaper titles and was political editor of the Sunday Mirror during the early 1970s.

== Personal life ==
Born John Alwyn Graham on 10 October 1926 in Omagh, County Tyrone, Northern Ireland, Graham was educated as a scholarship boy at The Royal School Armagh. He left school at 16 to begin his apprenticeship at The Ulster Gazette as a tea boy. This was Graham's first step toward a 31-year career in journalism that would lead him to become a front page fixture on Fleet Street. He later joined the Labour Party in 1949 and sat on both its policy and publicity committees in Northern Ireland.

== Journalism ==
Graham began his career as a junior reporter on the Ulster Gazette in County Armagh, Northern Ireland, before moving to the Belfast Telegraph where he was the industrial correspondent. He later joined the Daily Herald as its only staff journalist in Ireland, stating when interviewed in 1972:

Much of my time was spent in dashing back and forth across the border after stories.

John was the youngest member of the NUJ's National Executive, while he became chief news editor and foreign editor of the pre-Murdoch Sun prior to becoming political correspondent and later political editor on theSunday Mirror from 1969.

He received a special commendation in the IPC National Press Awards for two years running – in both 1972 and 1973.

== Tributes ==
Following John's untimely death in Biarritz, France on 7 August 1974, messages were received by the Editor of the Sunday Mirror from both Prime Minister Harold Wilson and the Leader of the Opposition Edward Heath. Wilson stated, as directly quoted to the Editor:

John was a man who was not only admired for his high professionalism but who also won great affection by his personal qualities of charm, integrity and good humour. We shall miss him greatly.

He is buried at St Mark's Church of Ireland, Armagh.
