= Carrickfergus Advertiser =

The Carrickfergus Advertiser was a weekly newspaper in the County Antrim town of Carrickfergus in Northern Ireland. Founded in 1883, the Carrickfergus Advertiser was part of a group of regional newspapers that also included the Ballyclare Gazette and Larne Gazette. All three newspapers had closed by 2014.

== History ==
The Carrickfergus Advertiser was established in 1883. In 1991, it was acquired by the Alpha Newspaper Group, partly owned by former Ulster Unionist Party MP and later member of the House of Lords John Taylor, Baron Kilclooney.

The East Antrim Gazette Series had three editions: the Carrickfergus Advertiser (established 1883), the Ballyclare Gazette and Larne Gazette (both established in 1994). The Carrickfergus Advertiser was the traditional weekly newspaper of the area, and was the only paper with a full-time office in the centre of Carrickfergus. The three editions (the Carrickfergus Advertiser, Ballyclare Gazette and Larne Gazette) circulated in an area with a population of approximately 80,000.

ITN journalist Dermot Murnaghan started his career at the Carrickfergus Advertiser.

The Larne Gazette closed in 2011. The Ballyclare Gazette and Carrickfergus Advertiser closed down in January 2014.
