= Tyrone Constitution =

Northern Irish newspaper

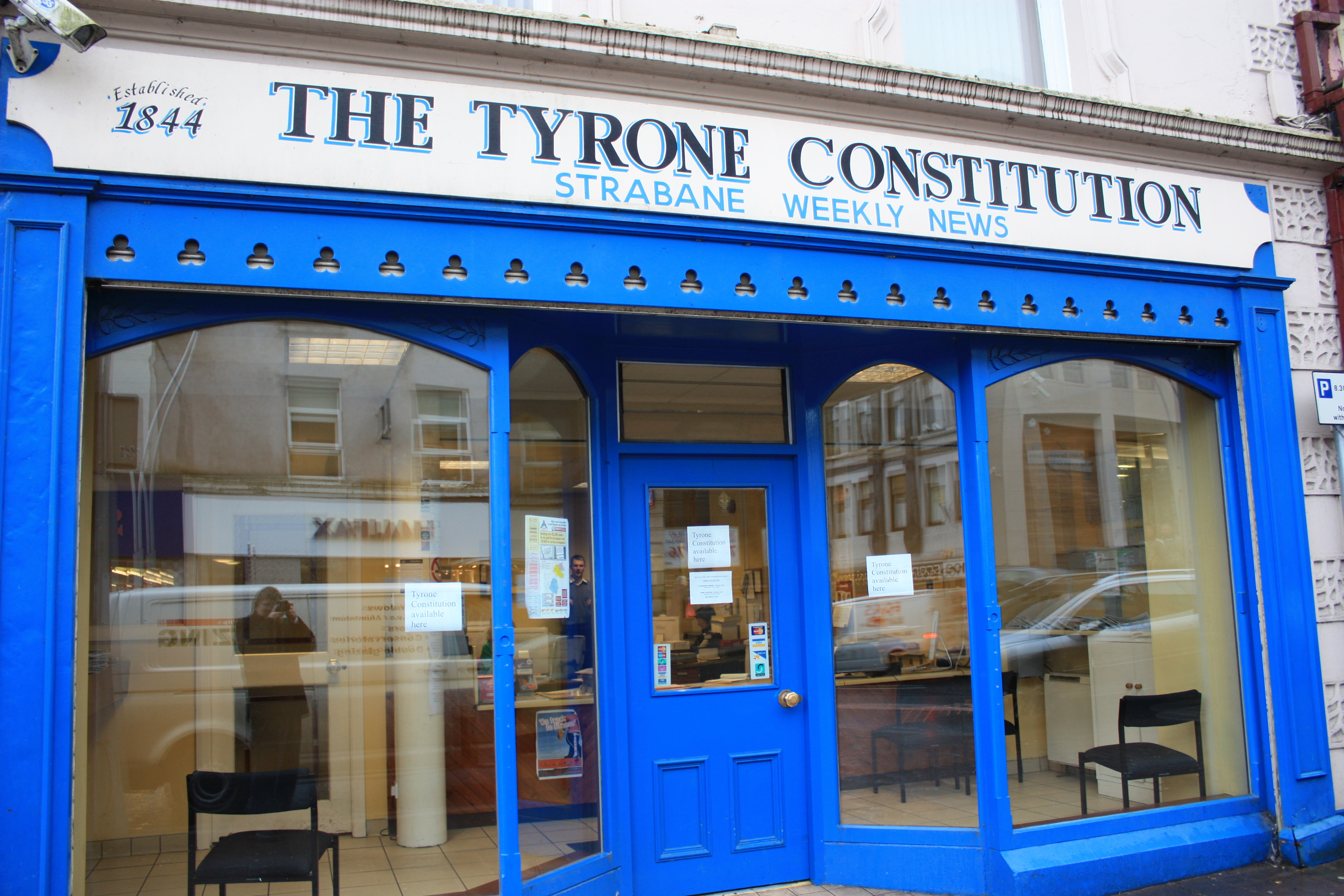
The Tyrone Constitution, High Street, Omagh, January 2010

The Tyrone Constitution is a newspaper based in Omagh, County Tyrone, Northern Ireland. It is published by the Alpha Newspaper Group. It describes itself as "The traditional newspaper for Omagh and district since 1844".

The Tyrone Constitution was established in 1844, the oldest newspaper in the county, and one of the longest-running in Northern Ireland. It circulates in a wide area of Tyrone, stretching from the Clogher Valley in the South to the Sperrin Mountains in the North and also penetrates into North Fermanagh. Omagh, the market county town of Tyrone, is at the heart of the circulation area and where the newspaper's editorial and advertising offices are sited. Although covering a largely rural area, there are significant business and commercial centres dotted throughout the sprawling circulation area. The Constitution has long been known for its in-depth coverage of community life and issues that concern the local populace. This was recognised when it received the Northern Ireland and UK Weekly Newspaper of the Year accolade in 1999.
