= Waterford News & Star =

Newspaper in Ireland

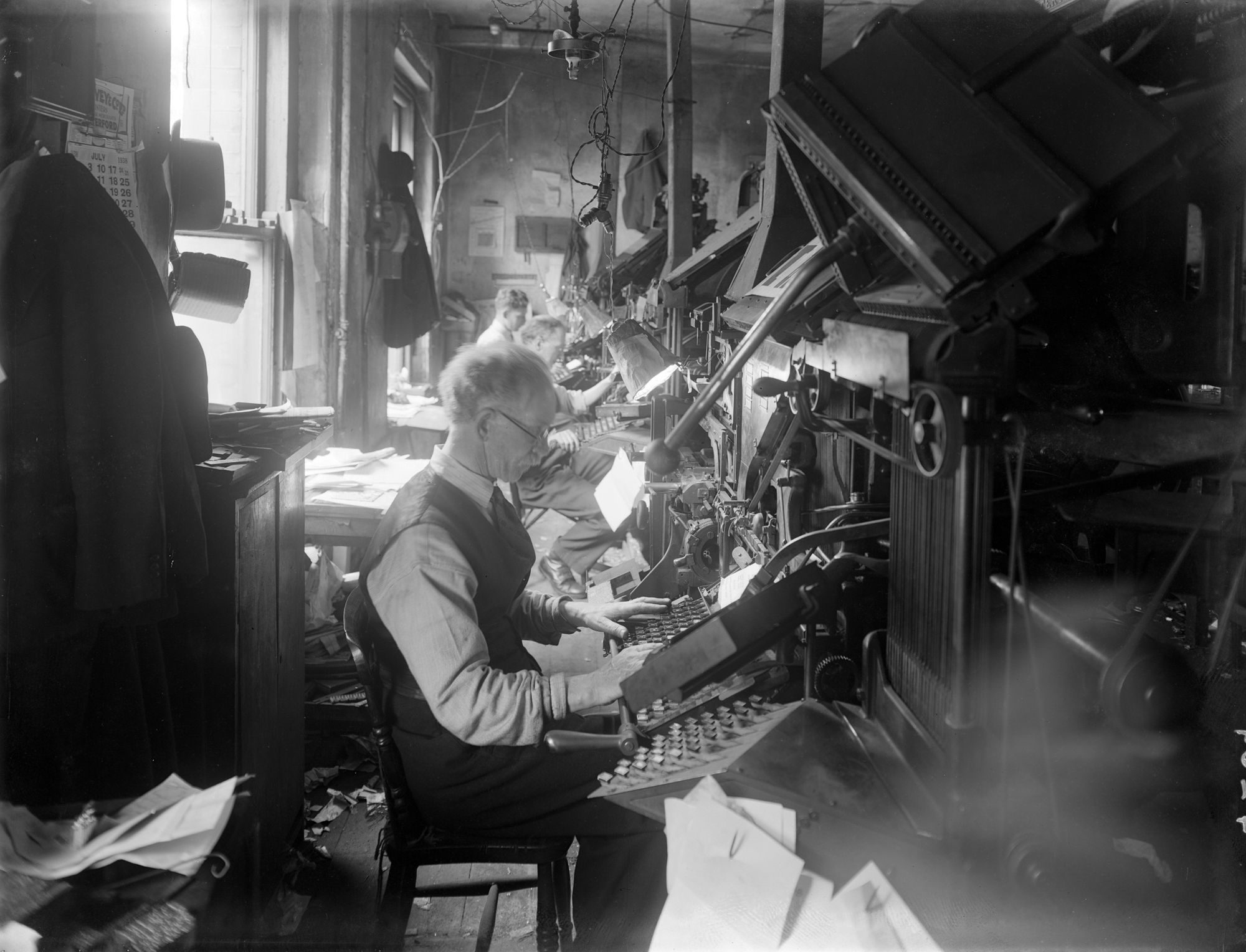
Typesetters working on linotype machines at the Waterford News, 29 July 1938

The Waterford News & Star is a local newspaper based in the Irish city of Waterford, first published as the Waterford Star in 1848.

In December 2007, it changed from a broadsheet to a tabloid. The Waterford News & Star in 2010/11 moved from its offices in Michael Street, Waterford City, to Gladstone House, Gladstone Street, Waterford. and covers stories from across the city and county.

John Cunningham was editor from 1982 to 1984. Another editor of the paper was Paddy O'Neill father of the present Irish Times Editor Paul O'Neill. Mary Frances Ryan is the present editor of the paper

The newspaper was part of the Thomas Crosbie Holdings group. Thomas Crosbie Holdings went into receivership in March 2013. The newspaper was acquired by Landmark Media Investments. In December 2017, a sale was agreed to The Irish Times pending regulatory approval. In July 2018, the sale of the title to The Irish Times was complete.

The sub-editing for the Waterford News & Star was provided by Wexford Echo Limited. Wexford Echo Limited went into liquidation in June 2017.
