= Tyrone Courier =

Northern Irish newspaper

The Dungannon News and Tyrone Courier is a weekly newspaper based in Dungannon, County Tyrone, with an office in Cookstown Northern Ireland. It is published by the Alpha Newspaper Group on Wednesdays.

It was formed from the merger of the separate Dungannon News and Tyrone Courier newspapers in the 19th century and is locally known as simply The Courier.
