= Boiling Point (miniseries) =

1999 British television documentary series

Boiling Point is a 1999 British television documentary series on British chef Gordon Ramsay produced by Tim Graham and David Nath for London Weekend Television (LWT), and narrated by Jack Davenport. With each segment 30 minutes in length, the five-part series was broadcast 25 February 1999 – 25 March 1999 on Channel 4.

Chef Ramsay is closely followed during eight months of his life as he opens his first (and now flagship) restaurant, Restaurant Gordon Ramsay, on Royal Hospital Road in Chelsea in September 1998. This establishment would later on earn him the prestigious three Michelin Stars. It also covers his participation in the dinner made at the Palace of Versailles on 11 July 1998 to celebrate the closing of the 1998 FIFA World Cup and features young chefs Marcus Wareing and Mark Sargeant at the early stages of their careers, as well as mentor Marco Pierre White.

Boiling Point was the first mass exposure of Ramsay to television audiences, revealing his highly driven, impatient and hot-tempered personality, which has become his trademark.

The series was followed in 2000 by a six-part LWT miniseries, Beyond Boiling Point, again produced by Tim Graham (this time with Paul Denchfield and Lucy Leveugle) for LWT, which follows Ramsay as he copes with his celebrity status and juggles cooking with the ever-increasing demands on his time from beyond the kitchen.

== List of episodes ==
Episode 1
Ramsay has resigned as head chef of the Aubergine Restaurant - managed by A-Z Restaurants - after its management overruled his authority and sacked one of his most trusted chefs. This, combined with Ramsay's belief that he can no longer realistically pursue his goal of obtaining three Michelin stars in a restaurant with corporate ownership, leads him to strike out on his own and open his first restaurant. He learns that ITV has secretly filmed him verbally abusing his staff for a television show called Britain's Most Unbearable Bosses, and that the show is planned to air on the same night that the restaurant opens. He worries this will negatively affect bookings and permanently damage his reputation, but these fears do not materialise when the restaurant ends up being fully booked.

The restaurant's opening night gets off to a chaotic start when the extraction fans and air conditioning fail simultaneously, raising the temperature inside the kitchen to 138 °F (58 °C) and causing most of the staff to nearly pass out. Despite this, Ramsay refuses to compromise his high standards and makes an unforgettable impression on the staff in the process. Towards the end of the night, he angrily sacks his assistant wine waiter for drinking a bottle of Badoit in front of customers. The episode ends with Ramsay returning home to watch Britain's Most Unbearable Bosses with his wife Tana and Marcus Wareing.

Episode 2
It is October 1998, the restaurant is a month old. Ramsay accepts £5,000 (later revealed to be £3,500) from the English Apples and Pears Association to demonstrate a Bramley apple recipe, but he secretly uses a Granny Smith apple base with a bit of Bramley puree, telling the camera the food critics won't know the difference. Ramsay then gains notoriety for ejecting Sunday Times food critic A. A. Gill - and by extension his dining partner Joan Collins - from the restaurant after the latter published a series of personal attacks against him and his failed football career. He also serves lunch to Matthew Fort, food critic for The Guardian, who later offers a mixed review of his food.

Episode 3
Gordon fishes with Marco Pierre White, who confides to the camera about Gordon's highly competitive nature, which creeps into even the simplest things like fishing. Ramsay's maitre d' Jean-Claude Breton spots staff from the Michelin Guide appearing for dinner, perhaps a sign of a coveted third Michelin star, and Ramsay banishes the camera crewmembers from the kitchen in order to perfect the service.

Episode 4
To celebrate the 1998 FIFA World Cup, MasterCard sponsors a dinner at Versailles in Paris. Ramsay helps plan the event, in which no natural gas is allowed as a fire precaution. Ramsay has to cook with electric, which he hasn't done in years. Dinner timing is held up by delays with makeup for a dance troupe, causing a cascade of failures that result in overcooking of all the sea bass. Ramsay is disillusioned with the assembly-line nature of catering. He says he can't wait to get on the 8:30 a.m. train and return to his 14-table dining room where standards are maintained.

Episode 5
It is March 1999 and Episode 2 has aired, upsetting the apple association that had given Ramsay £3,500. There is a large protest group outside the restaurant; Ramsay goes in the basement and telephones his contacts for help, though the show fails to explain the outcome. Ramsay disciplines carelessness in his establishment: waiter Silva serves a table the wrong starters and is sacked; chef Mark neglects to send out starters and is sent out for a break; waiter Tom keeps getting down on the floor to clean something and Ramsay smacks his head. In January 1999, Michelin is days away from releasing its new list, which could possibly make Ramsay the youngest three-star chef, displacing Ramsay's mentor Marco Pierre White. Ramsay and Marco engage in a friendly rivalry seeking inside information on the announcement; soon an inside contact tells Ramsay there are no new three stars.
