= Anton Savage =

Irish radio and television presenter

- Born: Dublin, Ireland
- Occupations: PR Advisor, Radio presenter, television presenter
- Known for: Presenter on Newstalk, Commuxations Expert, RTÈ Today TV Show panelist and Former presenter on Today FM and Ireland AM

Anton Savage is an Irish radio and television presenter.

== Early life ==
Anton Savage was born in Dublin. He is the only child of media commentator Terry Prone and former RTÉ chairman Tom Savage.

Savage studied in Belvedere College, before completing a degree in English in Trinity College Dublin.

== Career ==
Savage's first job was as a trainee researcher for Daybreak on Radio Ireland. He then moved on to working with his parents at their company Communications Clinic. While working for Communications Clinic, Savage worked for Fine Gael politicians including then Taoiseach Enda Kenny.

He has presented many shows on Irish radio throughout his radio career. He has been a regular presenter on Today FM, having presented the Sunday Business Show in 2011 before hosting his own show, Savage Sunday. He took over from Ray D'Arcy's 9 am-12 pm slot with The Anton Savage Show in 2015. In 2016, Savage left Today FM. In 2021, it was announced that Savage would begin hosting a weekend programme on NewsTalk. In December 2025 it was announced that Anton Savage would be becoming the new presenter of Newstalk Breakfast in February 2026 , weekday mornings 7-9 on Newstalk replacing Ciara Kelly & Shane Coleman who from February 2026 become the new presenters of The Hard Shoulder . As a result Anton Savage’s weekend shows ended in late January 2026.

== TV career ==
In 2013, Savage became one of the hosts of Ireland AM, filling in for Mark Cagney while he was undergoing surgery, however, he left in 2014 to present his own show on TV3.

Savage was praised by Russell Crowe in 2018 for his response to David Quinn while on the Virgin Media One Tonight Show.

In 2020, Savage returned to Ireland AM, following the departure of Karen Koster from the show.

== Personal life ==
Savage married his wife Cathy in 2012.
