= John Healy (Irish journalist) =

Irish journalist

John Healy (1930–1991) was an Irish journalist and author from Charlestown, County Mayo, who wrote for The Western People and The Irish Times.

== Personal life ==
Healy was born on 22 April 1930 in Charlestown, Co. Mayo. His parents were Stephen Healy, an insurance agent, and Nora Healy (née O'Donnell), a nurse. He attended secondary school at St Nathy's College in Ballaghadereen. In 1953 he married Evelyn Duffy.

== Career ==
He joined the Western People in 1948, then moved to Dublin to work for the Irish News Agency, a government-run news service managed by Conor Cruise O'Brien. He worked for a time for The Irish Press group before joining the Irish Times in 1959. Healy also edited The Dublin Evening Mail for a time.

Healy was a journalist with The Irish Times newspaper, writing the Backbencher column in the 1960s and 1970s. He was a close friend of the editor, Douglas Gageby.

Healy's book No One Shouted Stop (The Death of an Irish Town), published in 1968, chronicled the economic and social decline of rural life in the west of Ireland in a time of widespread poverty and mass emigration. He also wrote Nineteen Acres on the history and lifestyle of his family, who were small farmers.

Healy was a strong Fianna Fáil supporter and one of the most fervent journalistic supporters and admirers of both Donagh O'Malley and Charles Haughey. Healy's support for the latter caused considerable controversy among his fellow Irish Times journalists, many of whom were outspoken opponents of Haughey.

== Death and legacy ==
Healy died 6 January 1991, and was survived by his wife, Evelyn.

In March 2007, a RTÉ radio journalist visited Charlestown and assessed the changes in Healy's hometown in the forty years since the writing of his book.

Honours and places bearing his name include the Western Development Commission/John Healy Awards, the N5 Charlestown bypass, and the John Healy Western People Awards.

== Published works ==
- The Death of an Irish Town (Mercier Press, 1968)
- Nineteen Acres (ISBN 0906312108, Kennys Bookshops, 1978)
