= Martyn Turner =

Political cartoonist

Martyn Turner (born 1948) is an English-born Irish political cartoonist, caricaturist and writer, working for the Irish Times since 1971. His cartoons appear four times a week in the newspaper, parodying current events.

== Life ==
=== Early life and education ===
Turner was born in Wanstead, Essex and grew up in London. He was educated at Bancroft's School. In 1967, he went to Belfast, enrolling at Queen's University Belfast where he read geography. Turner was the first member of his family to go to university. Returning to London for his first Christmas break from college, he learned that his grandparents came from both Irish Catholic and Scottish Presbyterian backgrounds. He declared himself neutral in all matters northern Irish.

Living in Belfast exposed Turner to the sectarianism of the city and he experienced the initial years of the Troubles. Northern Ireland politics have been a major theme in his work.

=== Career ===
Around 1970, he began drawing professionally for the Sunday News. Upon graduation, he joined the Belfast current affairs magazine Fortnight, where he became assistant editor, editor and then co-editor with Tom Hadden. In 1976 he was made political cartoonist at the Irish Times, where he still draws four cartoons a week and writes occasionally. The Cartoonists and Writers Syndicate / New York Times distribute some of Turner's cartoons to over 200 journals and newspapers around the world.

He has also worked for British various publications such as The Scotsman, Business AM, The Business, The Sunday Express, The Independent, The Guardian and The Spectator and the Paris-based current affairs magazine Courrier International, as well as The Washington Post.

=== Personal life ===
Turner lives in County Kildare with his wife. In 2020, he became an Irish citizen through naturalisation. He has one son and two grandsons. He is a lifelong supporter of Leyton Orient.

== Recognition ==
Turner has been recognised and honoured with:

- 1997, Commentator of the Year Award, Irish Media Awards
- 1998, award of an honorary doctorate by the University of Ulster
- 2001, award of European Political Cartoonist of the Year, Forte dei Marmi
- 2001, award of an honorary doctorate by Queen's University Belfast
- 2010, Canadian Human Rights Awards
- 2010, Tonight Media Awards, Dublin

== Publications ==
=== Solo works ===
- End Games (Irish Times Books, 2020)
- Turner's Taoisigh – My Brush With Kildare Street (Irish Times Books, 2014)
- Our Work Here Is Done (Irish Times Books, 2011)ISBN 9780907011354
- Up Every Tree- The bumper Book of Bertie (Gill and Macmillan, October 2006) ISBN 0-7171-4158-6
- Martyn Turner's Greatest Hits (Gill & Macmillan, 28 October 2003) ISBN 0-7171-3573-X
- Railings (Blackstaff Press, October 2000) ISBN 0-85640-687-2
- The Golfer's Guide to World History (Blackstaff Press, November 1999) ISBN 0-85640-663-5
- Brace Yourself, Bridge It! (Blackstaff Press, October 1998) ISBN 0-85640-639-2
- The Noble Art of Politics (Blackstaff Press, October 1996) ISBN 0-85640-583-3
- Pack Up Your Troubles (Blackstaff Press, September 1995) ISBN 0-85640-569-8
- The Odd Couple (Irish Times Books, November 1994) ISBN 0-907011-21-7
- Politics et al. (Irish Times Books, 1992)
- The Long Goodbye: A cartoon tribute to a Taoiseach (Irish Times Books, 1992) ISBN 0-907011-19-5
- The Man Who Won the Tour De France (Gill & Macmillan, 31 October 1991) ISBN 0-7171-1916-5
- Not Viking Likely (Irish Life Viking Adventure, 1988)
- Heavy Weather (Gill & Macmillan, 31 December 1989) ISBN 0-7171-1699-9
- Fistful of Dáilers (Gill & Macmillan, 20 October 1987) ISBN 0-7171-1551-8
- 'Illuminations' (Boethius Press 1986)
- Martyn Turner: The Book (Irish Times Books, 1983) ISBN 0-907011-10-1

In 2007, 2008, 2009, 2010 and 2011 The Irish Times published a calendar of Turner cartoons, given away free with the newspaper

=== Collaborative works ===
- Thin Black Lines Rides Again – Colm Regan, Scott Sinclair, Martyn Turner (TIDE – June 1994) ISBN 0-948838-30-2
- Cattle Rustling: A Retelling of the Táin – James Simmons, Martyn Turner (Fortnight Educational – December 1991) ISBN 0-9509081-3-4
- Thin Black Lines – Colm Regan, Scott Sinclair
- Columba – A cartoon History of The Americas (Potatoe Press)

=== Illustration ===
- Pull the Door Marked Push: Inside the High I. Q. Society – Anne Schulman (Granta Editions, Nov 1992) ISBN 0-906782-96-1
