= Tom Savage (Irish media figure) =

Irish television presenter (1940–2017)

- Born: 10 October 1940
- Died: 30 March 2017 (aged 76)
- Education: Maynooth College; Queen's University Belfast (QUB)
- Occupation: Chairperson
- Employer: Raidió Teilifís Éireann (RTÉ)
- Spouse: Terry Prone
- Children: Anton Savage

Tom Savage (10 October 1940 – 30 March 2017) was a senior Irish media executive, the director of The Communications Clinic and a former Roman Catholic priest.

== Early years ==
Savage was born on 10 October 1940 in County Louth. He entered Maynooth in 1959 earning degrees in divinity and arts, before being ordained a priest in 1964 for service in the Roman Catholic Archdiocese of Armagh.

The relatively recently appointed Archbishop then appointed Savage to further studies at QUB. It was while studying at Queen's that he was a member of Sigerson Cup winning QUB team.

After graduating from Queens in 1968, he became Director of Social Welfare in the Archdiocese of Armagh, a post he held until 1972. Also in 1972, William Cardinal Conway appointed him to the Independent Broadcasting Authority (IBA).

In 1972, he was seconded to the Catholic Communications Institute at the request of Bunny Carr, the then Director of the Catholic Communications Centre in Booterstown, Dublin, where he became a lecturer. During those years, he was a regular presenter of the End the Day religious programme on UTV and of Outlook on RTÉ TV.

Tom Savage lectured in the Sociology of Media and Central and Local Government in the School of Journalism in Rathmines and was a third level external examiner for the then VECs in Athlone and Carlow. He was the first Health Promotion Officer of the then Health Education Bureau.

== Communications career ==
He joined Bunny Carr's company, Carr Communications, in the mid-1970s. He delivered consultancy and management training in Britain, the US, Canada, Greece, France, Italy, Spain and Portugal. He was Communications Advisor to former Taoiseach Albert Reynolds. He resigned from the company in 2008.

His textbook on negotiations, "How to Get What you Want", was published in 1999.

== RTÉ career ==
He worked in RTÉ Radio as a night news editor and in its features department. He presented RTÉ television shows It Says in the Papers, Eyewitness to History, and For Better or For Worse. He was appointed Chairman of the RTÉ Board on the 24th February 2009.

== Personal life ==
Savage's first career was as a Roman Catholic priest.

Savage met and married to Terry Prone, while he was working in Dublin in the early 1970s: he left the priesthood and was laicised in 1975. Their wedding was celebrated by Fr Brian Darcy. Prone went on to be become a co-owner of The Communications Clinic. Their son, Anton Savage, was an Irish radio presenter on Today FM.

Savage died in 2017 and his funeral mass was celebrated by his old Maynooth College friend Cardinal Sean Brady who said of him "we studied the ancient classics together, played on the pitch and prayed in the same pews. We became friends for life."
