= Landmark Media Investments =

Irish media holding company

Landmark Media Investments was a media holding company owned by Tom Crosbie and his father Ted Crosbie with Irish newspaper, radio and digital investments. Their ownership was via Rinvery Ltd. Landmark Media Investments was established in February 2013 and acquired several assets of Thomas Crosbie Holdings in March 2013. Landmark Media Investments sold all their media interests to The Irish Times in July 2018.

== Employee numbers and job cuts ==
Landmark Media Investments employed 554 as at March 2013. Employee numbers were reduced to around 500 as at April 2014. The number of staff employed subsequently fell to around 420. Staff levels were 414 as at 31 December 2017.

In April 2014, Landmark Media Investments announced 55 to 60 job cuts. The job cuts were mainly caused because of efficiencies due to the centralisation of activities in Cork.

In June 2015, further job cuts occurred at the Roscommon Herald.

== Legal cases ==
Landmark Media Investments, as occupiers of a building in Cork, were sued by Kilquane in April 2013. Although the case was against Examiner Publications Ltd, Landmark Media Investments occupied the building. Kilquane wanted Landmark Media Investments to vacate the building after rent was allegedly not paid on the building for two years. The case had a full hearing on 8 May 2013. On 16 May 2013, Landmark Media Investments were given a High Court order to vacate their premises. The floors occupied were vacated. The building was put up for sale, by the owners, in September 2016.

Landmark Media Investments were sued by WebPrint Concepts in March 2013. WebPrint Concepts also sued Thomas Crosbie Holdings. Both were sued over breach of contract. Judge Peter Kelly would only move the case onwards to the Commercial Court if WebPrint supplying evidence of funds to cover the case.

On 3 July 2014, Landmark Media Investments, Thomas Crosbie Holdings and Post Publications LTD were involved in an unfair dismissal lawsuit. In February 2015, the verdict, against Post Publications, was appealed.

In July 2017, Landmark Media Digital, who are owned by Landmark Media Investments, and who publish breakingnews.ie, were taken to the Labour Court by the National Union of Journalists (NUJ). The NUJ alleged that Landmark Media Investments are underpaying 'journalists' and subjecting them to unsocial hours without compensation.

== Bid for The Sunday Business Post ==
Landmark Media Investments, submitted a basic proposal to buy The Sunday Business Post, including funding facilities to the newspaper's examiner on 29 March 2013, as did other potential bidders. Landmark Media Investments was expected to form a joint venture with The Irish Times if it succeeded.

It was reported on 28 April 2013, that Landmark Media Investments had pulled out of the bidding for The Sunday Business Post. Landmark Media Investments were not successful in their bid for the Sunday Business Post.

== Beat 102 103 license renewal ==
The Broadcasting Authority of Ireland submitted tenders for the renewal of radio licenses in 2013. Beat 102-103, who were owned by Landmark Media Investments, were up against Power FM for the same license.

On 2 May 2013, the Broadcasting Authority of Ireland opened up the license renewal process to a "competitive licensing process", with two bidders remaining for the license that Landmark Media then hold.

Beat 102 103 was the sole bidder for the licence and signed an agreement with the BAI for ten more years of broadcasting.

== Radio licences ==
After Thomas Crosbie Holdings went into receivership, Landmark Media Investments required some approvals to gain ownership of the former Thomas Crosbie Holdings radio assets.

On 10 January 2014, The Competition Authority cleared, with proposals, the acquisition by Sappho Limited (who are 100% owned by Landmark Media Investments) of sole control of WKW FM Limited (Beat 102 103) and South East Broadcasting Company Limited (WLR FM) and joint control of Siteridge Limited (Red FM).

== ABC exit ==
ABC publish newspaper circulation figures on a bi-annual basis for Irish newspapers. Landmark Media Investment newspapers received ABC circulation statistics for 2012, with most ABC circulation statistics showing declines. In 2013, Landmark Media Investments pulled the majority of their newspapers from the ABC circulation statistics.

== Financial accounts ==
In December 2014, Landmark Media Investments published their 2013 accounts. There was a €700,000 loss for the period. There was a bank loan of €19.5 million carried over from Thomas Crosbie Holdings. There was a further €1 million loan from its parent company, Rinvery Ltd. A deficit of €2.8 million relating to the legacy TCH pension scheme will be reflected in the 2014 accounts. The directors believed that there was enough "resources" for 2014.

In the Wexford Echo liquidation court case, which took place in June 2017, it was revealed that debt owed to AIB from Landmark Media Investment stood at €16.5 million. This was not total debt, rather just debt owned to AIB.

In October 2017, Landmark Media Investments published their 2014 accounts. The accounts, which covered 2015, showed that Landmark had recorded an impairment charge of €14.7m as it prepared for the sale. This led to a €14.9m loss. “An offer was made by this prospective purchaser, and negotiations including due diligence process are currently ongoing to finalise the terms of the sale,” the directors said in their report.

== BenchWarmers ==
In mid 2015, Landmark Media Investments sought to acquire Benchwarmers.ie. Benchwarmers.ie is a “sports and banter” site.

The acquisition was subject to approval by the Competition and Consumer Protection Commission (CCPC). In May 2017, the CCPC cleared the proposal.

== Red FM loan ==
Landmark Media Investments fully owned a subsidiary called Sappho Ltd. Sappho Ltd own 17% of Siteridge Ltd. Siteridge Ltd own Red FM. Sappho Ltd provided a loan of €1.3 million to Red FM. The loan was an interest free loan. Siteridge Ltd made a loss in 2014.

== 2017 Wexford Echo Limited liquidation ==
On 29 June 2017, it was reported that a liquidator had been appointed to Wexford Echo Limited, who were owned by Landmark Media Investments, and published the Wexford Echo, Gorey Echo, New Ross Echo and the Enniscorthy Echo. Wallace, an insolvency practitioner at KPMG, has been appointed as liquidator and was trying to find a buyer. The Waterford News and Star and The Nationalist and Leinster Times are also affected because Wexford Echo Limited provided sub editing for these titles.

On 1 July 2017, it was reported that Kevin Mitchell, who owns Datascope, was a potential buyer.

On 9 July 2017, it was reported that Wexford Echo Limited had lost €187,000 in 2015, lost €253,000 in 2016 and lost €131,000 from January 2017 to May 2017. Wexford Echo Newspapers owed €525,000 to AIB and €524,000 to Landmark Media Investments as at liquidation point.

On 19 August 2017, it was reported that most staff had been made redundant.

== 2017/2018 sale to The Irish Times ==
In February 2017, it was reported that Landmark Media Investments had appointed KPMG as advisors. A range of options were being considered, including an Independent News and Media "link" with the Irish Examiner.

In March 2017, it was reported that The Irish Times might bid for the Irish Examiner, and by April both The Irish Times and Independent News & Media had signed non-disclosure agreements and entered a sales process for the Irish Examiner. On 17 April 2017, though Independent News & Media stated that they were not in talks to acquire the Irish Examiner, the Irish Independent reported that "The Irish Times was "understood to be engaged with the team hired to find a buyer for the paper".

During May 2017, it was reported that both Key Capital and The Irish Times were considering a bid to acquire the Irish Examiner. It was also reported that Iconic Newspapers might acquire the Landmark Media Investments regional titles and that PWC and AIB were in discussions about a debt restructure.

By July 2017, it had been reported that Iconic Newspapers, Trinity Mirror and Independent News & Media were all interested in acquiring the remaining regional newspapers.

In August 2017, it was reported that Landmark Media Investments had ceased making payments into the Irish Examiner Pension Scheme. The scheme was to be wound up. At the same it was reported that The Irish Times would be the likely purchaser of Irish Examiner and a deal was likely to be announced in Q4 2017.

By late August 2017, it was reported that The Irish Times were in "pole position" to acquire the Irish Examiner, and that Iconic Newspapers were likely to acquire the Landmark Media Investments regional titles. It was also reported that Rupert Murdoch's Wireless Group was interested in acquiring Landmark Media Investments radio assets.

On 17 September 2017, it was reported that The Irish Times purchase of the Irish Examiner had been agreed in principle but costs, staffing and debt apportionment were still be agreed. It was suggested that the sale of the Irish Examiner to The Irish Times would occur first, with Iconic Newspapers then acquiring regional titles. Some staff were reportedly concerned about job losses.

On 17 October 2017, Landmark Media Investments confirmed that the sale of the Group was under negotiation. By 6 December 2017, Landmark Media Investments had confirmed that all newspaper, radio and website interests would to be sold to The Irish Times subject to regulatory approvals. AIB was to take a "debt write down" as part of the sale.

During March and April 2018, The Competition and Consumer Protection Commission (CCPC) announced their decision to carry out a Phase 2 investigation into the proposed transaction, whereby The Irish Times would acquire sole control of the Irish Examiner. The CCPC then cleared The Irish Times deal to buy Landmark Media Investments, and (following this determination) the parties had to submit a separate notification to the Minister for Communications, Climate Action and Environment. The Minister for Communications, Climate Action and the Environment, Denis Naughten, approved the proposed transaction in June 2018. The BAI also approved the radio station purchases. Legal and compliance steps are required next before the deal can close.

On 10 July 2018 the acquisition was complete. The Irish Times owned the media investments from this date. The Crosbie family no longer owned the media assets.

== Former newspaper investments ==
- Irish Examiner (Sold to The Irish Times)
- Evening Echo (Sold to The Irish Times)
- Roscommon Herald (Sold to The Irish Times)
- Western People (Sold to The Irish Times)
- Waterford News & Star (Sold to The Irish Times)
- The Nationalist (Carlow) (Sold to The Irish Times)
- Kildare Nationalist (Sold to The Irish Times)
- Laois Nationalist (Sold to The Irish Times)
- Wexford Echo (Liquidator appointed in June 2017)
- Gorey Echo (Liquidator appointed in June 2017)
- Enniscorthy Echo (Liquidator appointed in June 2017)
- New Ross Echo (Liquidator appointed in June 2017)

== Former radio investments ==
- Beat 102-103 (75% ownership) (Sold to The Irish Times)
- WLR FM (75% ownership) (Sold to The Irish Times)
- Red FM (17% ownership) (Sold to The Irish Times)

== Former digital investments ==
- RecruitIreland.com (Sold to The Irish Times)
- BreakingNews.ie (Sold to The Irish Times)
- BenchWarmers.ie (Sold to The Irish Times)
