= Ulster Gazette =

Northern Irish newspaper

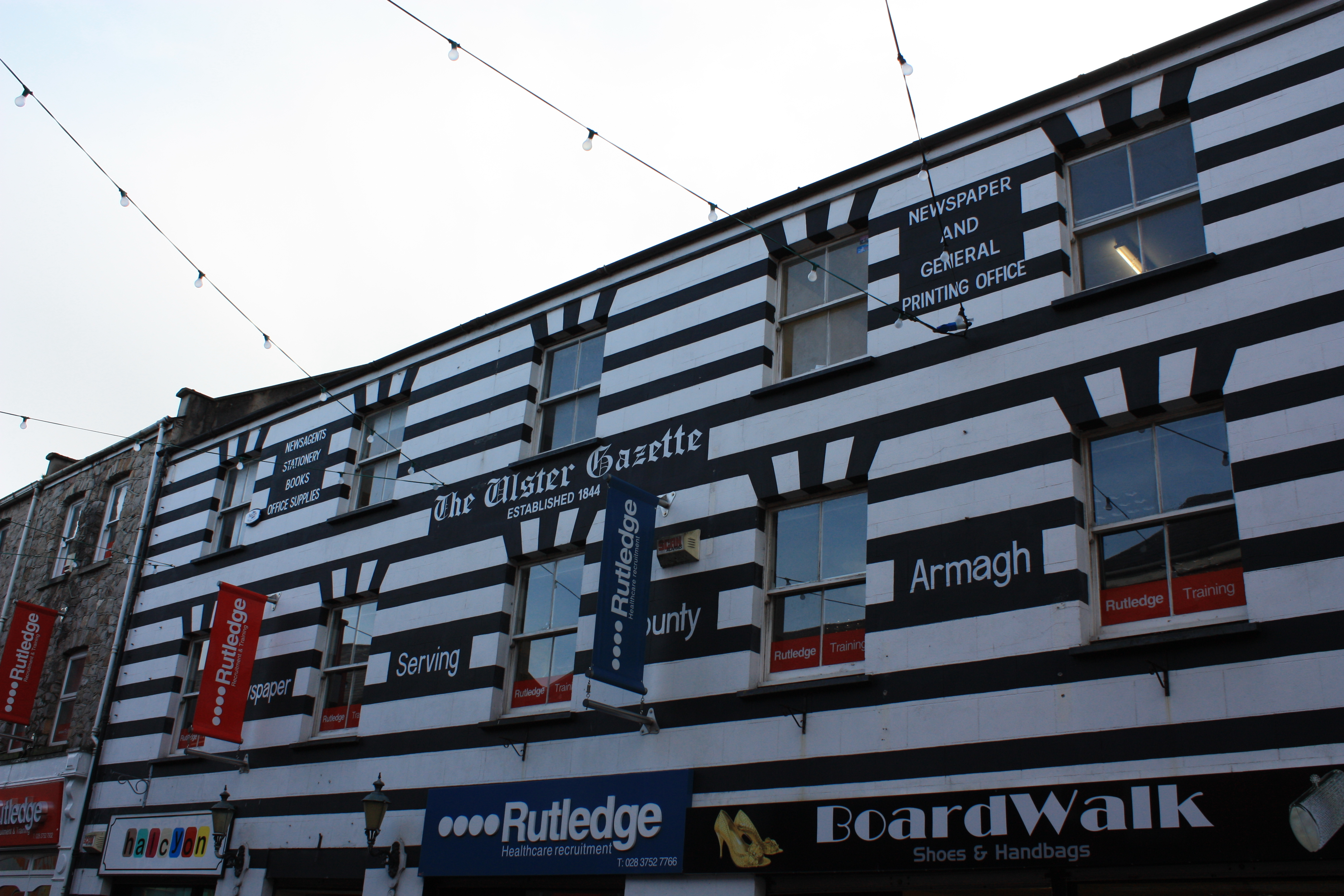
Ulster Gazette, Scotch Street, Armagh, November 2009

The Ulster Gazette, also known as the Ulster Gazette and Armagh Standard, is a newspaper based in Armagh, Northern Ireland. It is published by the Alpha Newspaper Group and has had the largest readership in the Armagh city and district since 1844.

The Gazette circulates throughout the entire City and District of Armagh and in some parts of Portadown.

The newspaper's circulation in 2013 was an average of 7,130 copies sold a week.
