= WLR FM =

Radio station in Waterford, Ireland

Waterford; Ireland
- Broadcast area: Waterford City and County, Ireland
- Frequency: 95.1fm / 97.5fm / 94.8fm

Programming
- Languages: English, with dedicated Irish programme and occasional Irish spoken on other programming
- Format: Adult contemporary/talk

Ownership
- Owner: The Irish Times and Des Whelan
- Sister stations: Absolute Irish Radio

History
- First air date: 8 September 1989

Links
- Webcast: https://www.wlrfm.com/player
- Website: wlrfm.com

WLR FM, or more commonly WLR (Waterford Local Radio) is the local radio station covering Waterford City and County, Ireland. It was named the IMRO (Irish Music Rights Organisation) "Local Station of the Year" in 2019, 2020, 2021, 2022 and 2024. In addition to the official franchise area, the station also has a considerable listenership in South County Kilkenny and East County Cork. Licensed by the Broadcasting Commission of Ireland since 1989, WLR was originally a pirate radio station.

WLR broadcasts on three frequencies: 95.1 MHz for most of the county (and a low-power transmitter also on 95.1 MHz for Waterford city centre), 97.5 MHz for Waterford city and much of East Waterford, and a low-power transmitter on 94.8 MHz to cover the East Waterford coast. In September 2018, WLR launched a new Country and Irish digital radio station Absolute Irish Radio.

== History ==
The original WLR, which was a pirate station, launched on 23 June 1978 broadcasting from the garage of Rick Whelan at Killotteran just outside the city. This unlicensed operation was one of the longest lasting in the country and continued for just over a decade until its closure at the end of 1988 – new radio licences were to be awarded by the then IRTC (now Broadcasting Authority of Ireland) in 1989.

WLR, with a number of local businessmen on board formed a consortium to apply for the franchise to broadcast to Waterford city and county. This application had competition from two other applicants, one (Deise Broadcasting Company) involved former pirate ABC Radio and local business people, and another application (Waterford Radio/WRFM) which was backed by the then Waterford Foods and The Munster Express newspaper. The IRTC held oral hearings for the Waterford licence at the Tower Hotel in Waterford city on 27 April 1989 where all three applicants presented their case.

The WLR consortium won and the licensed WLR FM launched on 8 September 1989 from studios on Georges Street above the Georges Court Shopping Centre in Waterford City. The station broadcast from these studios for many years until the building of the present purpose-built Broadcast Centre, at Ardkeen, Waterford. The station's licence has been unchallenged on subsequent renewals.

The station was 75% owned by Thomas Crosbie Holdings until that company went into receivership in March 2013. The 75% stake was acquired by Landmark Media Investments. In December 2017, a sale of the 75% stake to The Irish Times newspaper was agreed pending regulatory approval. In July 2018, the sale of the station to the newspaper was complete.

== Studios ==
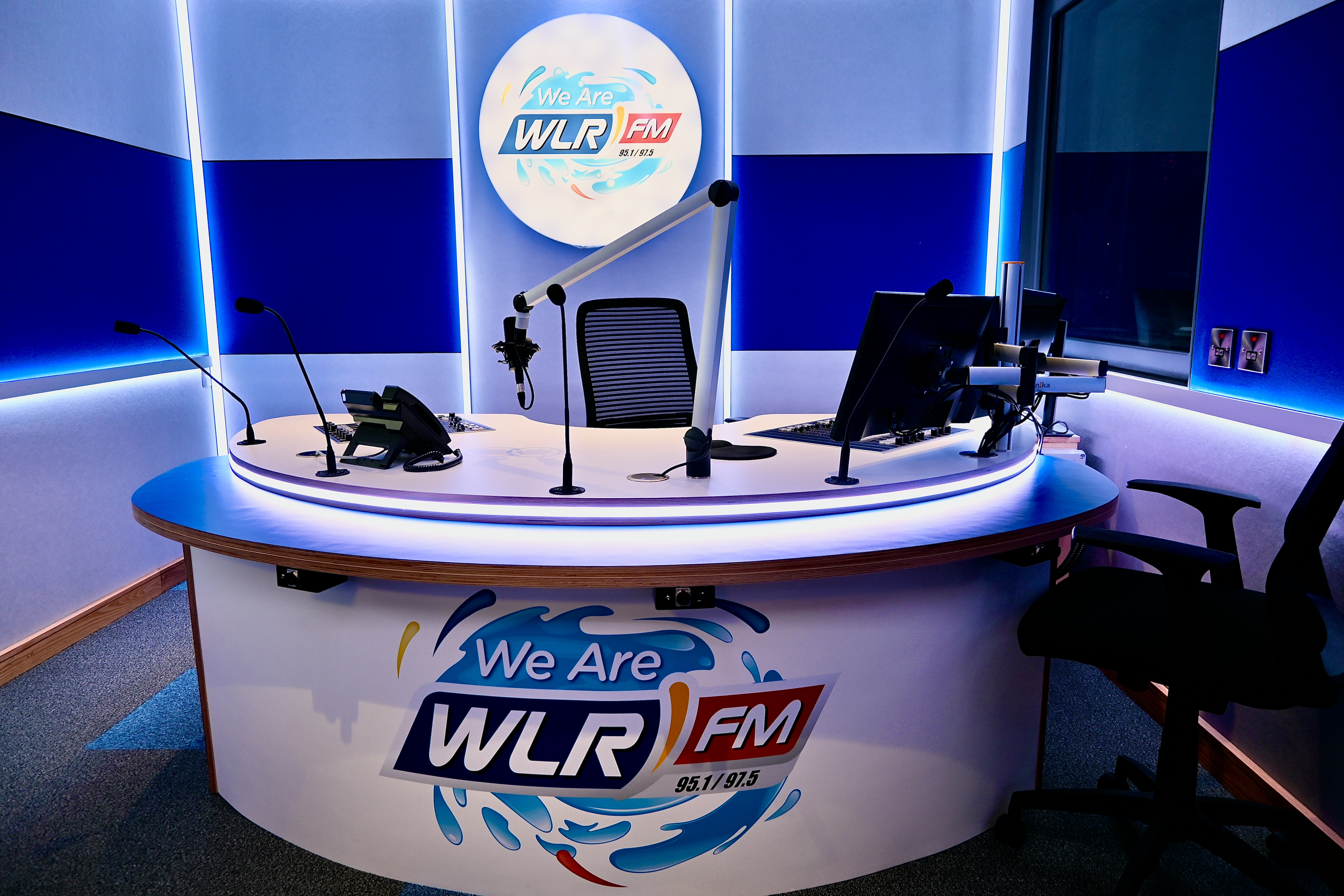
Main talk studio

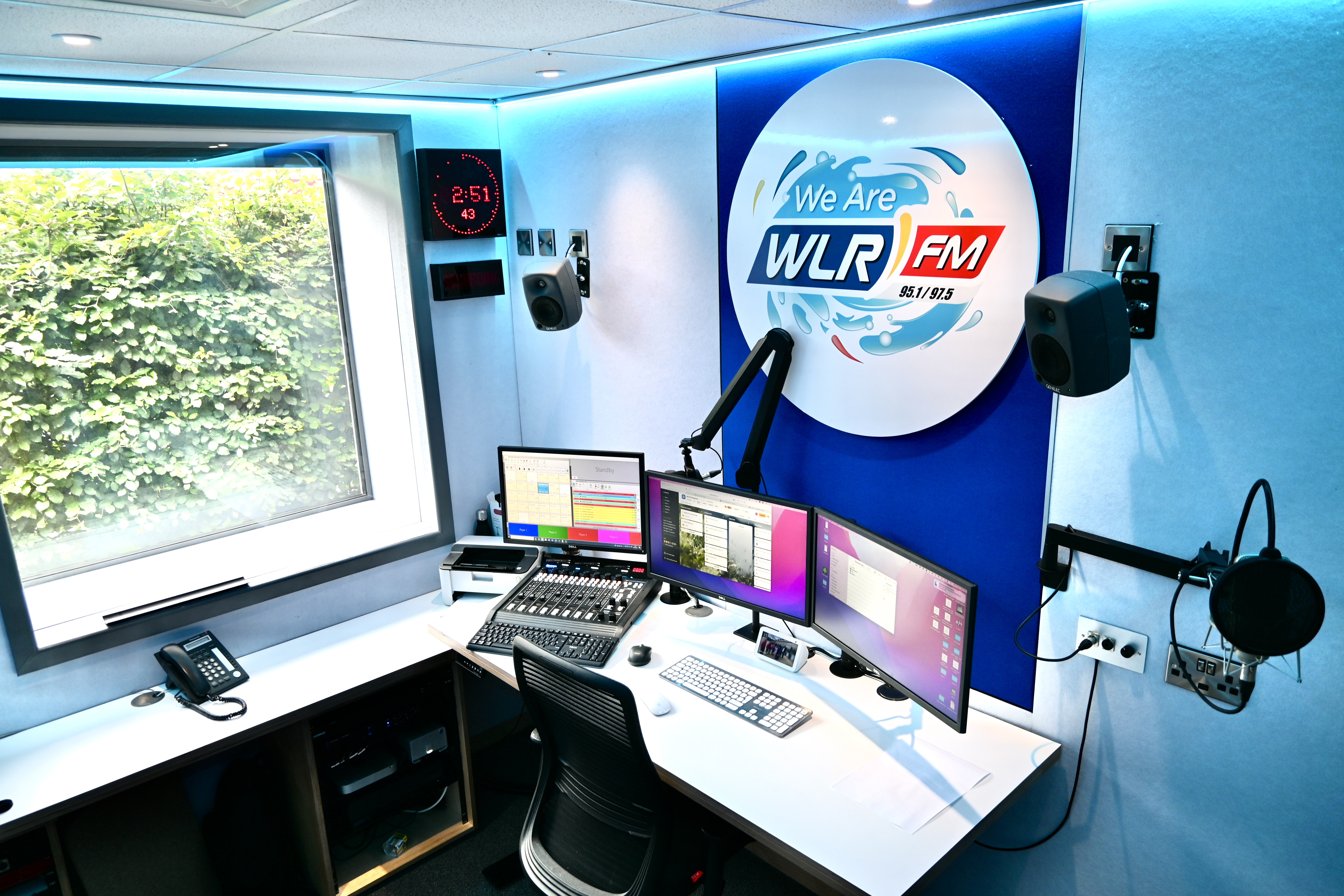
Commercial production studio

The station has purpose-built studios at The Broadcast Centre, Ardkeen, Waterford City (shared with regional youth station Beat 102 103) and at the Dungarvan studio at The Plaza, Dungarvan Shopping Centre. The Broadcast Centre was opened by the taoiseach, Bertie Ahern, in 2003. It replaced WLR FM's previous studio at Great Georges Street in Waterford City, while the new Dungarvan studio was opened by head of the Broadcasting Authority of Ireland, Michael O'Keefe, on 10 November 2007, replacing the existing studio at Harbour Bay in the town.

An outside broadcasting unit was launched in 2020. The first studio opened in April 2024.

== Market share ==
According to the JNLR 2018-1 National Radio Listenership Survey, WLR FM reached a weekly audience of 64,000 in the first quarter of 2018.
