= Douglas Gageby =

Irish newspaper editor

(Robert John) Douglas Gageby (29 September 1918 – 24 June 2004) was one of the pre-eminent Irish newspaper editors of his generation. His life is well documented and a book of essays about him, written by many of his colleagues, some of whom had attained fame for their literary achievements, was published in 2006 [Bright Brilliant Days: Douglas Gageby and the Irish Times, ed. Andrew Whittaker, Dublin, A&A Farmar, 2006].

Gageby was born in Dublin, at 54 Upper Beechwood Avenue, Ranelagh, to Thomas Gageby, a Belfast-born civil servant. His mother, Ethel Elizabeth née Smith, was a schoolteacher from County Cavan. The Gageby family moved to Belfast when Douglas was about three as his father went to work for the Northern Ireland Civil Service following partition. His paternal grandfather Robert Gageby had stood as a Labour parliamentary candidate in Belfast North in 1910, and was a Belfast City Councillor for 20 years, first elected in 1898 as a trade union candidate supported by the Independent Labour Party.

He was educated at Belfast Royal Academy and Trinity College Dublin, where he was elected a scholar in Modern Languages (French and German) in 1940. He was also actively involved with the student newspaper Trinity News. He enlisted in the Irish Army as a private soldier at the outbreak of World War II. He was commissioned later, and he served as an intelligence officer. He reported from post-war Germany for The Irish Press and went on to work under Conor Cruise O'Brien in the Irish News Agency. In 1954 he was the first editor of the Evening Press. In 1963 he became editor of The Irish Times, a post he held until 1986, having been brought back from a short retirement in 1974. He is credited with moving the Irish Times from a Unionist organ into a successful Irish journal of record.

== 'White Nigger' controversy ==
In 2003 it was revealed that a director (and later Chairman) of The Irish Times, Major T. B. McDowell, had referred to Gageby as a 'white nigger' for his views and role in the paper during the Northern Ireland Civil Rights Movement's campaign in the 1960s. The comment appeared in a letter from the British Ambassador to Dublin, Sir Andrew Gilchrist, to Kelvin White, head of the Irish Section of the British Foreign Office and is dated 2 October 1969. Gilchrist was referring to conversations which he had with McDowell where the latter professed himself to be fully behind the British government in the North and hostile to Gageby's coverage of the CRM. However, historian Mark O'Brien notes "Despite his contacts with London, McDowell's actions did not interfere with Gageby's editorials on Northern Ireland", due to the fact McDowell believed in editorial independence (even though McDowell strongly disagreed with Gageby's nationalist views), and because Gageby was making the newspaper commercially successful. Under the 30 year rule, this letter was made available to newspapers on 22 and 23 December 1999, but no newspaper published it at that time.

The communiqué was later discovered by the historian, Jack Lane, and published in the Irish Political Review, a small magazine strongly antagonistic to The Irish Times, in January 2003. He brought it to the attention of The Irish Times editor, Geraldine Kennedy, on 10 January 2003 and she replied on 15 January 2003 saying she was "unable to confirm the veracity of it" and did not publish it. When, on 26 January 2003, the Sunday Independent (Ireland) published the story, The Irish Times finally followed the next day, 27 January. Nonetheless, on 24 April 2004 Kennedy defended her position by saying, "The contents of the letter in question were published on January 27, 2003, as soon as its existence was drawn to my attention."

== Private life ==
Douglas Gageby was married to Dorothy, daughter of Seán Lester (last Secretary General of the League of Nations). His daughter, Susan Denham was the Chief Justice of the Supreme Court of Ireland from 2011 to 2017.

== Works ==
- "Last Secretary General: Sean Lester and the League of Nations" by Douglas Gageby, 1999, ISBN 1-86059-108-6
