= Alpha Newspaper Group =

Alpha Newspaper Group is a media group, primarily involved in local newspaper publishing and radio broadcasting, in Northern Ireland. The company's headquarters are in Moygashel near Dungannon, County Tyrone.

== Ownership ==
The group is partly owned, and chaired, by businessman and retired Ulster Unionist politician John Taylor, Baron Kilclooney.

Alpha Newspaper Group previously owned two newspapers in County Offaly (Tullamore and Midland Tribune) in the Republic of Ireland. In April 2019, Alpha Newspapers sold these titles to Iconic Newspapers subject to regulatory approval.

== Titles published ==
=== Northern Ireland ===
==== Newspapers ====
- Ballymena Guardian
- Northern Constitution
- The Outlook
- Strabane Weekly News and Donegal Reporter
- Tyrone Constitution
- Tyrone Courier
- Ulster Gazette
- Coleraine Chronicle
- Ballycastle Chronicle
- Antrim Guardian
- Newry Democrat
- The Ballymoney Chronicle
- The Mid Ulster Chronicle

==== Radio stations ====
Alpha Newspapers, The Irish News and River Media are part of the consortium Northern Media Group, which operates six radio stations in Northern Ireland:

- Q Radio Belfast
- Q Mid Antrim 107
- Q Mid Ulster 106
- Q102.9
- Q101.2
- Q97.2

=== Former Republic of Ireland ===
- Midland Tribune (Acquired from Midlands Tribune, sold to Iconic Newspapers)
- Tullamore Tribune (Acquired from Midlands Tribune, sold to Iconic Newspapers)
- Roscommon Champion (Closed)
- Longford News (closed)
- Athlone Voice (closed)
- Ballyclare Gazette(sold)
- Carrickfergus Advertiser (Closed)
- Larne Gazette (closed)
