= The Irish Times =

Daily newspaper in Ireland

- Type: Daily newspaper
- Format: Broadsheet
- Owners: The Irish Times Trust CLG (The Trust); The Irish Times DAC
- Editor: Ruadhán Mac Cormaic
- Founded: 29 March 1859; 167 years ago
- Language: English; Irish
- Headquarters: 24–28 Tara Street, Dublin, Ireland
- Circulation: Circulation no longer audited
- ISSN: 0791-5144
- OCLC number: 137350020
- Website: www.irishtimes.com

The Irish Times is an Irish daily broadsheet newspaper and online digital publication. It was launched on 29 March 1859. The editor is Ruadhán Mac Cormaic. It is published every day except Sundays. The Irish Times is Ireland's leading newspaper and the largest subscription news service in Ireland. It is owned by The Irish Times Trust rather than by a private commercial entity. It is considered a newspaper of record for Ireland.

Though formed as a Protestant Irish nationalist paper, within two decades and under new owners, it became a supporter of unionism in Ireland.

In the 21st century, it presents itself politically as "liberal and progressive", as well as being centre-right on economic issues. The editorship of the newspaper from 1859 until 1986 was controlled by the Anglo-Irish Protestant minority, only gaining its first nominal Irish Catholic editor 127 years into its existence.

The paper's notable columnists have included writer and arts commentator Fintan O'Toole and satirist Miriam Lord. The late Taoiseach Garret FitzGerald was once a columnist. Michael O'Regan was the Leinster House correspondent for more than 30 years. Senior international figures, including Tony Blair and Bill Clinton, have written for its op-ed page.

Its most prominent columns have included the political column Backbencher, by John Healy; Drapier (an anonymous piece produced weekly by a politician, giving the 'insider' view of politics); Rite and Reason (a weekly religious column, edited by Patsy McGarry, the religious affairs editor); and the long-running An Irishman's Diary. An Irishman's Diary was written by Patrick Campbell in the forties (under the pseudonym "Quidnunc"); by Seamus Kelly from 1949 to 1979 (also writing as "Quidnunc"); and in the early 2000s by Kevin Myers. After Myers' move to the rival Irish Independent, An Irishman's Diary has usually been the work of Frank McNally. On the sports pages, Philip Reid is the paper's golf correspondent.

One of its most popular columns was the biting and humorous Cruiskeen Lawn satire column written, originally in Irish, later in English, by Myles na gCopaleen, the pen name of Brian O'Nolan (Brian Ó Nualláin) who also wrote books using the name Flann O'Brien. Cruiskeen Lawn is an anglicised spelling of the Irish words crúiscín lán, meaning "little full jug". Cruiskeen Lawn made its debut in October 1940, and appeared with varying regularity until O'Nolan's death in 1966.

== History ==
=== Origins in 19th century ===
A newspaper entitled The Irish Times was founded in 1823, but this closed in 1825. The title was revived decades later by Lawrence E. Knox, (later known as Major Lawrence Knox), a 22-year-old army officer. Initially he published thrice-weekly publication but soon shifted to a daily newspaper; the first edition was published on 29 March 1859. He founded it as a moderate Protestant newspaper, reflecting his politics. Knox envisaged it as a "new conservative daily". Its headquarters were at 4 Lower Abbey Street in Dublin. Its main competitor in its early days was the Dublin Daily Express.

After Knox's death in 1873, the paper was sold to the widow of Sir John Arnott, a Member of Parliament (MP), a former Lord Mayor of Cork, and owner of Arnotts, one of Dublin's major department stores.

The sale, for £35,000, led to two major changes. Arnott shifted the headquarters to 31 Westmoreland Street; the newspaper operated from this area until 2005. Its politics shifted dramatically, and it became predominantly Unionist in outlook. It was closely associated with the Irish Unionist Alliance. The paper, along with the Irish Independent and various regional papers, called for the execution of the leaders of the failed 1916 Easter Rising.

=== 20th century ===
Though the paper became a publicly-listed company in 1900, the Arnott family continued to hold a majority shareholding until the 1960s (even after the family lost control, the great-grandson of the original purchaser was the paper's London editor). The last member of the Arnott family to sit on the paper's board was Sir Lauriston Arnott, who died in 1958.

During the 1930s, the editor was R. M. Smyllie. The longest-serving editor of The Irish Times was Douglas Gageby.

In 1974, ownership was transferred to a non-charitable trust, The Irish Times Trust. The previous owner, ex British Army officer and MI5 agent, Major Thomas Bleakley McDowell, was made "president for life" of the trust that runs the paper; he was paid a large dividend.

The Irish Times launched an online edition of its newspaper in 1994.

The paper established its first bureau in Asia when foreign correspondent Conor O'Clery moved to Beijing, China, in 1996.

=== 21st century ===
The Irish Times suffered considerable financial difficulty in 2002 when a drop in advertising revenue coincided with a decision by the company to invest its reserves in the building of a new printing plant. None of the journalists was laid off, but many took a voluntary redundancy package when the paper was greatly restructured.

Some foreign bureaus were closed and it stopped publishing "colour" pages devoted to Irish regions, with regional coverage merged with news. The paper's problems stemmed partly from internal strife, which led to McDowells's daughter, Karen Erwin, not being made chief executive. The reorganisation had the desired effect; after posting losses of almost €3 million in 2002, the paper returned to profit in 2003.

In 2004, The Irish Times launched a digital edition of its newspaper, whereby it could be read online in the same format as its physical edition.

In May 2005, the paper launched a new international edition, to be printed in Great Britain so as to be available in London and southeast England at the same time as other daily newspapers (previously, copies of the Irish edition were flown from Dublin to major cities in Britain on passenger flights, arriving around lunchtime).

In 2008 the Central Bank of Ireland fined The Irish Times after its management admitted breaking market abuse rules.

In 2009, the Supreme Court ordered the paper to pay €600,000 in costs, despite it having won its case in support of protecting journalistic sources. The court said the paper's destruction of evidence was "reprehensible conduct".

When the Irish government signed the Companies Act 2014, the Trust registered the overall Irish Times Group as a designated activity company, The Irish Times Designated Activity Company (The Irish Times DAC).

In December 2017, The Irish Times reportedly had reached an agreement to purchase the newspaper, radio and website interests of Landmark Media Investments, which include the Irish Examiner. Initially subject to regulatory approval, the sale was completed in July 2018.

In September 2018, The Irish Times started a voluntary redundancy scheme. This followed the Landmark Media Investments acquisition.

Beginning in 2015, The Irish Times focused on growing the number of its subscribers in order to achieve a more sustainable funding model. In December 2025, the editor Ruadhán Mac Cormaic announced that for the first time, its journalism was fully funded by its subscribers.

==== Diversification ====
The company has diversified from its original Irish Times title as a source of revenue. Irish Times Limited took a majority share for €5m in the Gazette Group Newspapers, a group publishing three local newspapers in West Dublin, and has acquired a property website, MyHome.ie, the second-largest property internet website in Ireland, for €50m, seen as insurance against the loss of revenue from traditional classified property advertising.

In June 2009, journalists called on the board and trust to review "the flawed investment and diversification strategy of the company" and passed a motion saying that "ongoing investment in loss-making projects poses a serious threat to employment" at the newspaper. Four months later, the company announced a loss of €37 million and that 90 staff would be made redundant. The director, Maeve Donovan, who instigated the "investment and diversification" strategy, subsequently retired. She dismissed suggestions that she would receive a significant "golden handshake", saying that her package would be "nothing out of the ordinary at all". She was given a €1m "ex-gratia" payment by the newspaper "relating to a commutation of pension rights agreed with her".

The managing director said in 2009 that mobile phone applications would be a key investment for newspapers and in 2010, The Irish Times launched an application for iPhone and Android smartphones.

In June 2010, Gazette Group Newspapers' managing director claimed the company's affairs were being conducted oppressively by its majority shareholder, the Irish Times.

On 2 May 2024, it was announced that the Irish Times Group had acquired obituary business RIP.ie.

== Political stances and controversial stories ==
The editor during the 1930s, R. M. Smyllie, had strong anti-fascist views, and angered the Irish Catholic hierarchy by opposing General Franco during the Spanish Civil War. During World War II, The Irish Times, like other national newspapers, had problems with Irish Government censorship. The Irish Times was largely pro-Allies and was opposed to the Éamon de Valera government policy of neutrality.

In 1969, the longest-serving editor of The Irish Times, Douglas Gageby, was allegedly called a "white nigger" by company chairman Thomas Bleakley McDowell, because of the newspaper's coverage of Northern Ireland at the outset of the Troubles, which was supportive of Irish nationalism.

John Waters, a columnist who spoke out about the perceived vast salaries of the editor, managing director and deputy editor, was sacked and re-hired a week later, in November 2003. Former editor Geraldine Kennedy was paid more than the editor of the UK's top non-tabloid newspaper The Daily Telegraph, which has a circulation of about nine times that of The Irish Times. Later, columnist Fintan O'Toole told the Sunday Independent: "We as a paper are not shy of preaching about corporate pay and fat cats but with this there is a sense of excess. Some of the sums mentioned are disturbing. This is not an attack on Ms Kennedy, it is an attack on the executive level of pay. There is double-standard of seeking more job cuts while paying these vast salaries.

On 23 December 2004, The Irish Times ran a front-page story on the Provisional IRA's denial of involvement in the Northern Bank robbery, one of Europe's largest ever, and on the same day refused to print a column by Kevin Myers which said that the Provisional IRA was responsible. Myers was reported to be shocked by the spiking of his column. Some two weeks later, the paper printed a report that there might, after all, be a "nationalist" connection. Myers later left the paper in May 2006.

On 31 July 2010, The Irish Times published an article titled "The fighting Irish" about Irish nationals who enlisted in the British Armed Forces. The article featured interviews with members of the Royal Irish Regiment and the Irish Guards. It was subsequently criticised by current affairs magazine The Phoenix, which argued that the article romanticised the War in Afghanistan and served as little more than an indirect advertisement for the British military. The Phoenix accused the editor of The Irish Times, Geraldine Kennedy, of violating the Irish Defence Act which prohibits all forms of military recruitment advertising on the behalf of foreign militaries.

On 9 September 2011, the paper published a pseudonymous article by Kate Fitzgerald. Unknown to the paper, she had taken her life on 22 August 2011. The revelation sparked a nationwide debate on suicide with her parents appearing on television to discuss suicide and depression. The article criticised the reaction to her illness by her employer, The Communications Clinic, although it was only after she was identified as the author that her employer became known. The article was later removed from the paper's website, causing controversy online. The editor later told her parents that sections of her article were factually incorrect, but could not say which ones. Kate's parents complained to the Office of the Press Ombudsman about an apology made to The Communications Clinic, their complaint was upheld.

In September 2019, the paper reprinted an article from the New York Times by William Broad. The article claimed that "the blossoming anxiety over professed health risks of 5G [fifth generation wireless technology] 'can be traced to a single scientist and a single chart'". A complaint to the Office of the Press Ombudsman of the Press Council of Ireland was filed by Tom Butler of the University College Cork. The Press Council Ombudsman upheld Butler's complaint, ruling that "The Irish Times breached Principle 1 (Truth and Accuracy) of the Code of Practice of the Press Council of Ireland".

== Governance ==
In 1974, ownership was transferred to a non-charitable trust, The Irish Times Trust. The former owner, Major Thomas McDowell, was made "president for life" of the trust which runs the paper and was paid a large dividend. However several years later the articles of the Trust were adjusted, giving Major McDowell 10 preference shares and one more vote than the combined votes of all the other directors should any move be made to remove him. McDowell died in September 2009. The Trust is regulated by a legal document, the Memorandum and Articles of Association, and controlled by a body of people (the Governors) under company law. It is not a charity and does not have charitable status. It has no beneficial shareholders and it cannot pay dividends. Any profits made by The Irish Times cannot be distributed to the Trust but must be used to strengthen the newspaper, directly or indirectly. The Trust is composed of a maximum of 11 Governors. The Trust appoints Governors who are required to be "representative broadly of the community throughout the whole of Ireland".

As of March 2023, John Hegarty is the chair of the Trust, and the governors are Edmond Harty, Maeve Carton, Catherine Day, Bernard Harbor, David Sterling, Fiach Mac Conghail and Marguerite Sayers. They are predominantly from an Irish public sector background.

In 2015, The Irish Times Trust Limited joined as a member organisation of the European Press Prize.

== Offices ==
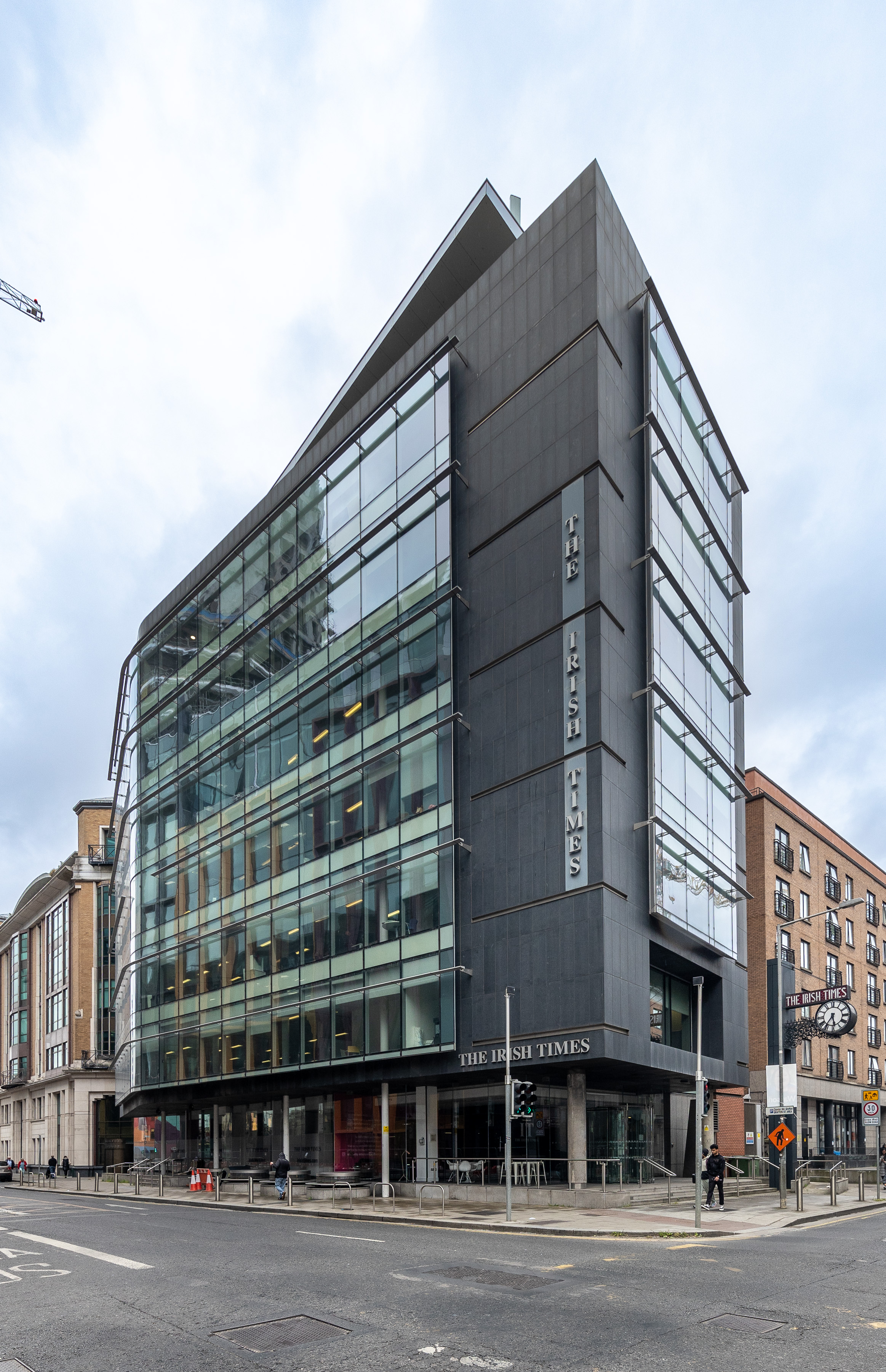
The Irish Times building, on Tara Street

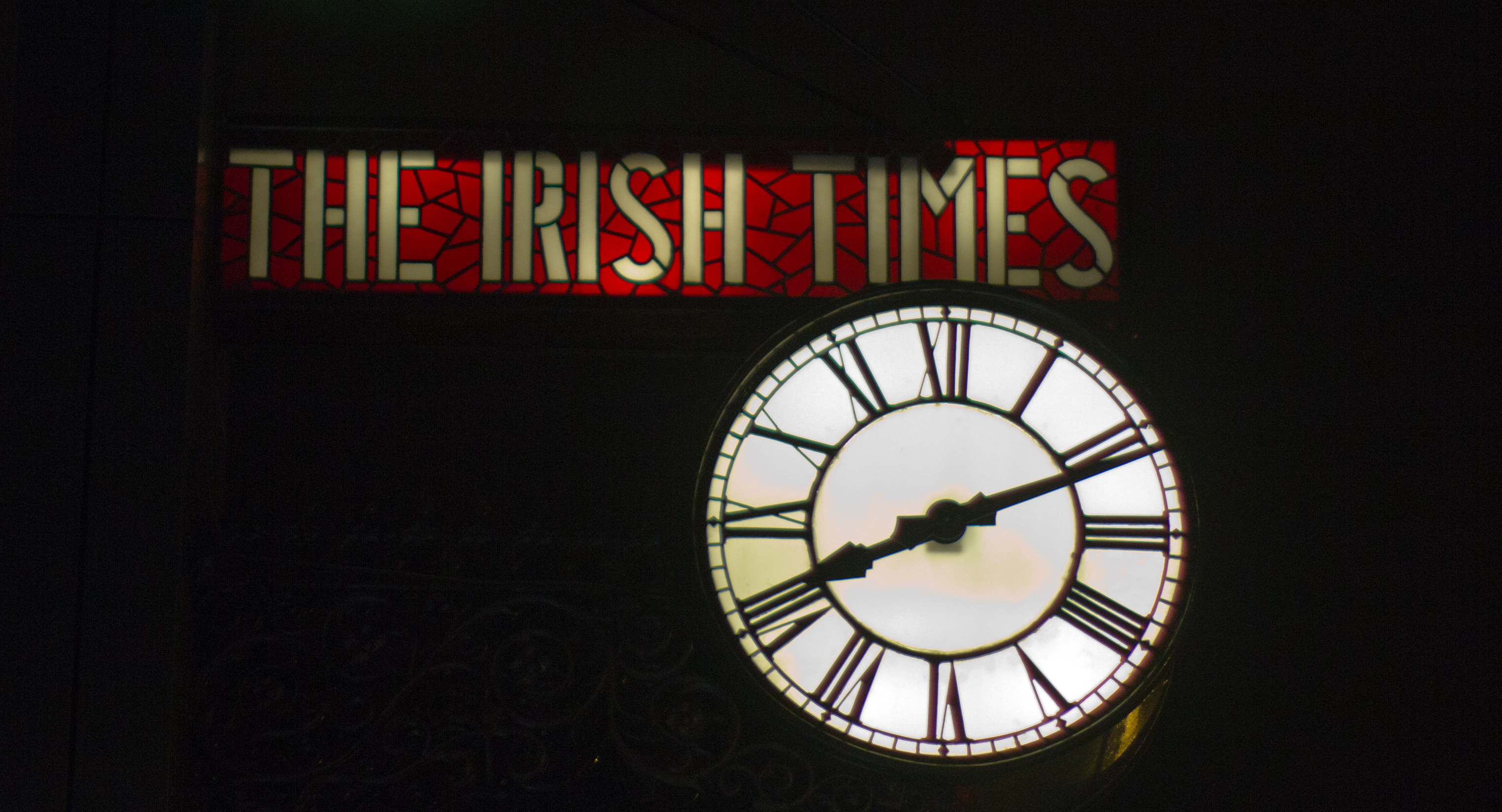
The Irish Times Clock, originally mounted on the D'Olier Street building, moved with the newspaper to the Tara Street offices in 2006.

In 1895, the paper moved from its original offices on Middle Abbey Street to D'Olier Street in the centre of Dublin. "D'Olier Street" became a metonym of The Irish Times which in turn was personified as "The Old Lady of D'Olier Street". In October 2006, the paper relocated to a new building on nearby Tara Street.

== Irish Times Literature Prizes ==
The Irish Times Literature Prizes were established in 1988, with the inaugural Irish Times International Fiction Prize (worth £7,500 in 1998) awarded in 1989. The Irish Literature Prizes (four categories, each worth £5,000 in 1998) were awarded for fiction, poetry, and non-fiction written in English. In 1998, a separate prize was for the first time awarded for a work in the Irish language, for the most outstanding title of all of the categories, which was awarded by a separate panel of judges.

The Irish Times International Fiction Prize, also known as the Irish Times/Aer Lingus International Fiction Prize until 1992 (when Aer Lingus ceased its sponsorship of the awards), was awarded annually until 2001. The winners of this prize were:

- 1989: Libra, by Don DeLillo
- 1990: Possession, by A. S. Byatt
- 1991: Wartime Lies, by Louis Begley
- 1992: Mating, by Norman Rush
- 1993: The Shipping News, by E. Annie Proulx
- 1995: The Master of Petersburg, by J. M. Coetzee
- 1997: Reading in the Dark, by Seamus Deane
- 1999: Birds of America: Stories, by Lorrie Moore
- 2001: Anil's Ghost, by Michael Ondaatje

== Formats and content ==
=== Columns ===
Regular columns include:

- An Irish Diary, a daily column with one frequent author at a time and many occasional contributors. Originally An Irishman's Diary and credited to "Quidnunc"; once the real authors was credited, the title was sometimes changed to An Irishwoman's Diary, An Englishman's Diary, etc. as appropriate. Frequent authors included Patrick Campbell, 3rd Baron Glenavy (1950s–60s), Kevin Myers (1980s–90s), and Frank McNally (since 2000s)
- Another Life, a weekly natural history column written and illustrated since 1977 by Michael Viney
- Rite and Reason, a weekly religious column, edited by the religious editor, Patsy McGarry. Many prominent Roman Catholic and Church of Ireland bishops, Irish Jewish leaders, theologians from all faiths, and journalists, among others, have written the column which is published on the op-ed page on Mondays.
- Social and Personal

=== Print ===
The paper has the same standard layout every day; the front page contains one main picture and three main news stories, with the left-hand column, News Digest, providing a "teaser" of some of the stories inside the Home News, World News, Sport, and Business Today sections, as well as other information such as winning lottery numbers and weather forecasts. Inside, it usually contains eight to twelve pages of Irish news, called "Home News", covering the Republic of Ireland and Northern Ireland. It devotes several pages to important stories such as the publication of government reports, government budgets, and important courts cases.

World News contains news from its correspondents abroad and from news wires and services such as Reuters, the Guardian Service, and the Los Angeles Times-Washington Post service; the paper has correspondents in London, Paris, Brussels, and Washington.

The Irish Times publishes its residential property supplement every Thursday, one of the printed residential property listings for the Dublin area; this is also online. Motoring and employment supplements are published on Wednesday and Friday respectively, and are also available online.

A business supplement is published every Friday, as is an entertainment supplement called The Ticket, with film, music, theatre reviews, interviews, articles, and media listings. Michael Dwyer, the film critic and recipient of the Chevalier des Arts et des Lettres, wrote for the supplement until his death in 2010.

On Saturdays, a Weekend section is published, with news features, arts profiles, television and radio columns, and book reviews of mainly literary and biographical works, with occasional reviews in the technology sector. The Saturday edition also includes the Magazine with consumer and lifestyle features on food, wine, gardening, and there are travel and sports supplements.

Three Sudoku puzzles and two crosswords are published daily including a cryptic crossword, formerly compiled by "Crosaire", and a "Simplex" crossword. There is also a letters page. J.J. Walsh contributed a chess puzzle to the paper for 70 years, from April 1955 until his retirement in May 2025. The puzzle was initially a weekly feature but became a daily fixture in September 1972.

The paper carries political cartoons by Martyn Turner and the American cartoon strip, Doonesbury. The business section has a satirical illustration by David Rooney every Friday. Tom Mathews contributes an arts-inspired cartoon (called "Artoon") to the arts section on Saturday.

The Irish Times previously carried a weekly Irish-language page on Wednesdays. This was expanded to a full supplement, titled Scéal, in April 2025.

=== Digital ===
In 1994, The Irish Times established a web presence on IEunet.ie, which moved to the address Irish-times.ie in 1995; it was the first newspaper in Ireland and one of the first 30 newspapers in the world to establish an online presence. The company acquired the domain name ireland.com in 1997, and from 1999 to 2008, used it to publish its online edition. This was freely available at first but charges and a registration fee were introduced in 2002 for access to most of the content. A number of blogs were added in April 2007, written by Jim Carroll, Shane Hegarty, and Conor Pope. On 30 June 2008, the company relaunched ireland.com as a separate lifestyle portal and the online edition of the newspaper was now published at irishtimes.com. Access to news on the new domain name was supplied free of charge, but a subscription was charged to view its archives.

On 15 October 2012 John O'Shea, Head of Online, The Irish Times, announced that the ireland.com domain name had been sold to Tourism Ireland, and that the associated ireland.com email service would end on 7 November 2012. The domain name was sold for €495,000. The ending of the email service affected about 15,000 subscribers.

The newspaper announced on 17 February 2015 the reintroduction of a paywall for its website, irishtimes.com, beginning on 23 February.

== Editors ==
1. George Ferdinand Shaw (1859)
2. Rev. George Bomford Wheeler (1859–1877)
3. James Scott (1877–1899)
4. William Algernon Locker (1901–1907)
5. John Edward Healy (1907–1934)
6. R. M. "Bertie" Smyllie (1934–1954)
7. Alec Newman (1954–61)
8. Alan Montgomery (1961–1963)
9. Douglas Gageby (1963–1974 and 1977–1986)
10. Fergus Pyle (1974–1977)
11. Conor Brady (1986–2002)
12. Geraldine Kennedy (2002–2011)
13. Kevin O'Sullivan (2011–2017)
14. Paul O'Neill (2017–2022)
15. Ruadhán Mac Cormaic (2022–present)

== Past and present contributors ==
- Charles Acton
- Malachy Clerkin
- Gerry Thornley
- John O Sullivan
- Sean Moran
- Johnny Watterson
- Gavin Cumiskey
- Mary Hannigan
- John Banville
- Brendan Behan
- Maeve Binchy
- Vincent Browne
- Tom Clonan
- Myles na gCopaleen
- Cónal Creedon
- Garret FitzGerald
- Theodora FitzGibbon
- Donal Foley
- Elgy Gillespie
- John Healy
- Mary Holland
- Róisín Ingle
- Dennis Kennedy
- Karlin Lillington
- Liam MacGabhann
- Emer McLysaght
- Lara Marlowe
- Seamus Martin
- Kevin Myers
- Breda O'Brien
- Conor O'Clery
- Aidan O'Sullivan
- Fintan O'Toole
- Fergus Pyle
- Arthur Quinlan
- Martyn Turner
- John Waters
- Noel Whelan
- Terence de Vere White
- Thomas Woods
- Maev-Ann Wren
- Newton Emerson

== Circulation ==
=== Print ===
Average print circulation was approximately 100,000 copies per issue in 2011, dropping to approximately 62,000 by 2017. The circulation of the newspaper is no longer audited.

Year (period)	Average circulation per issue
2005 (July to December)	117,370
2011 (January to June)	100,951
2012 (January to June)	92,565
2012 (July to December)	88,356
2014 (January to June)	80,332
2014 (July to December)	76,882
2015 (January to June)	76,194
2016 (January to June)	72,011
2016 (July to December)	66,251
2017 (January to June)	62,423
2017 (July to December)	61,049
2018 (January to June)	60,352
2018 (July to December)	58,131
2019 (January to June)	56,518
2019 (July to December)	54,147

=== Digital ===
ABC measure digital circulation based on paid for digital subscriptions that include an ePaper in the package. This means that the free student edition and the basic package, which does not include an ePaper, are excluded from the below statistics.

Year (period)	Average circulation per issue
2017 (July to December)	16,939
2018 (January to June)	18,903
2018 (July to December)	21,275
2019 (July to December)	24,389

== Newspapers owned by The Irish Times DAC ==
- The Irish Times
- Irish Examiner (acquired from Landmark Media Investments)
- The Echo (acquired from Landmark Media Investments)
- Roscommon Herald (acquired from Landmark Media Investments)
- Western People (acquired from Landmark Media Investments)
- Waterford News & Star (acquired from Landmark Media Investments)
- The Nationalist (Carlow) (acquired from Landmark Media Investments)
- Kildare Nationalist (acquired from Landmark Media Investments)
- Laois Nationalist (acquired from Landmark Media Investments)

== The Irish Times DAC investments ownership ==
=== Magazine ===
- Gloss Magazine (100% stake via Gloss Publications)

=== Radio ===
- WLR FM (acquired from Landmark Media Investments)

=== Digital ===
- RecruitIreland.com (acquired from Landmark Media Investments)
- BreakingNews.ie (acquired from Landmark Media Investments)
- Myhome.ie (acquired from Sherry FitzGerald, the Gunne Group and Douglas Newman Good)
- RIP.ie (acquired from Gradam Communications in 2024)

=== Other assets ===
- Itronics (training company)
- DigitalworX (web publisher)

== See also ==
- List of newspapers in Ireland
- Irish Times National Debating Championship
- List of Irish companies
- The Times (United Kingdom)
- The New York Times (United States)
