= List of newspapers in the Republic of Ireland =

Below is a list of newspapers published in Ireland.

== National titles – currently published – English language ==
=== Daily national newspapers ===
Title	Market type	Publisher	Ownership	Location	Format	Circulation (avg. paid single copies)
Irish Daily Star	National – tabloid	Reach plc	United Kingdom	Dublin	Tabloid	16,874 (May 2025)
Irish Daily Mirror	National – tabloid	Reach plc	United Kingdom	Dublin	Tabloid	14,661 (May 2025)
Irish Daily Mail	National – tabloid	DMG Media	United Kingdom	Dublin	Tabloid	14,285 (May 2025)
The Irish Sun	National – tabloid	News UK	United Kingdom	Dublin	Tabloid	Unknown
Irish Examiner	National – quality	The Irish Times	Ireland	Cork	Broadsheet	No longer audited
Irish Independent	National – quality	Mediahuis	Belgium	Dublin	Compact	No longer audited
The Herald (Ireland)	National – tabloid	Mediahuis	Belgium	Dublin	Tabloid	No longer audited
The Irish Times	National – quality	The Irish Times	Ireland	Dublin	Broadsheet	No longer audited

=== Sunday national newspapers ===
Title	Market type	Publisher	Ownership	Location	Format	Circulation (avg. paid single copies)
Irish Mail on Sunday	National – tabloid	DMG Media	United Kingdom	Dublin	Tabloid	32,707 (May 2025)
The Irish Sunday Mirror	National – tabloid	Reach plc	United Kingdom	Dublin	Tabloid	11,501 (May 2025)
Daily Star Sunday	National – tabloid	Reach plc	United Kingdom	London	Tabloid	4,099 (May 2025)
The Sunday Times	National – quality	News UK	United Kingdom	Dublin	Broadsheet	Unknown
The Irish Sun on Sunday	National – tabloid	News UK	United Kingdom	Dublin	Tabloid	Unknown
Sunday Independent	National – quality	Mediahuis	Belgium	Dublin	Broadsheet	No longer audited
Sunday World	National – tabloid	Mediahuis	Belgium	Dublin	Tabloid	No longer audited
Business Post	National – quality	Kilcullen Kapital Partners	Ireland	Dublin	Broadsheet	No longer audited

== Regional titles – currently published – English language ==
=== Carlow ===
- Carlow People (free newspaper published by Voice Media)
- The Nationalist (Owned by The Irish Times)

=== Cavan ===
- The Anglo-Celt (owned by Celtic Media Group).

=== Clare ===
- The Clare Champion (owned by the Galvin family)
- The Clare Echo
- The Clare County Express Est. 1979

=== Cork ===
- The Avondhu – north-east Cork and neighbouring areas of Limerick, Tipperary, Waterford
- Ballincollig News – Free tabloid monthly newspaper for Ballincollig, County Cork, sister publication of Bishopstown News
- Bishopstown News – Free monthly newspaper for the Western Suburbs (mainly Bishopstown and Wilton) of Cork City
- The Carrigdhoun – Carrigaline and south-east Cork
- Cork Independent – free Cork city- and county-based weekly newspaper
- The Cork News – free Cork city based weekly newspaper, launched 18 September 2009
- The Corkman (owned by Mediahuis)
- The Douglas Post – weekly magazine for Douglas, Cork
- The Echo (owned by The Irish Times)
- The Mallow Star (owned by VSO Publications)
- Midleton News – A4 size fortnightly newspaper for Midleton County Cork, sister publication of Youghal News, originally free, now retails for one euro
- The Muskerry News – free 40-page A4 monthly newspaper for the Ballincollig and Blarney area
- The North City News – free 40-page A4 monthly newspaper for the northside suburbs of the city of Cork
- The Opinion (formerly The Bandon Opinion) – monthly magazine for West Cork
- The Southern Star – primarily West Cork circulation
- The Vale Star (owned by VSO Publications)
- West Cork People – free monthly newspaper for West Cork, 9,000 copies
- Youghal News – free A4 size fortnightly newspaper for Youghal County Cork

=== Donegal ===
- Derry People/Donegal News (owned by North West of Ireland Printing and Publishing Company)
- The Donegal Democrat (owned by Iconic Newspapers)
- Donegal People's Press (owned by Iconic Newspapers)
- Donegal Post (owned by Iconic Newspapers)
- Finn Valley Post (owned by Iconic Newspapers)
- Finn Valley Voice
- Inish Times (owned by Iconic Newspapers)
- Inishowen Independent (owned by Iconic Newspapers)
- Tirconaill Tribune
- Letterkenny People (owned by Iconic Newspapers)
- Letterkenny Post (owned by Iconic Newspapers)

=== Dublin ===
- Northside People and Southside People - Dublin People Media Group.
- Dublin Gazette
- The Dublin Voice
- Dublin Inquirer
- The Echo
- Liffey Champion – south-west Dublin
- Newsgroup (Tallaght News, Clondalkin News, Lucan News, and Rathcoole & Saggart News)
- Northside News
- Southside News

=== Galway ===
- Connacht Telegraph (owned by Celtic Media Group)
- The Connacht Tribune/Galway City Tribune (owned by Iconic Newspapers)
- The Galway Advertiser
- The Tuam Herald((owned by Celtic Media Group

=== Kerry ===
- Kenmare News – free 40-page A4 monthly newspaper for the Kenmare area
- The Kerryman (owned by Mediahuis)
- Kerry's Eye
- Killarney Advertiser - www.killarneyadvertiser.ie, weekly community news magazine since 1973

=== Kildare ===
- Kildare Nationalist (owned by The Irish Times)
- Kildare Post (owned by Iconic Newspapers)
- Leinster Leader (owned by Iconic Newspapers)
- Liffey Champion – north Kildare and west Dublin

=== Kilkenny ===
- The Kilkenny People (owned by Iconic Newspapers)
- The Kilkenny Reporter (free sheet, owned by Iconic Newspapers, not connected with closed newspaper of the similar name Kilkenny Reporter).
- The Kilkenny Observer (free sheet, owned by Amici Sempre Ltd)

=== Laois ===
- Laois Nationalist (owned by The Irish Times)
- The Leinster Express (owned by Iconic Newspapers)

=== Leitrim ===
- Leitrim Observer (owned by Iconic Newspapers)

=== Limerick ===
- Limerick Leader (owned by Iconic Newspapers)
- Limerick Post
- Vale Star (published by VSO Publications)
- Weekly Observer (published by VSO Publications)

=== Longford ===
- Longford Leader (owned by Iconic Newspapers)

=== Louth ===
- The Argus (owned by Mediahuis)
- The Drogheda Independent (owned by Mediahuis)
- Drogheda Leader
- The Dundalk Democrat (owned by Iconic Newspapers)
- The Dundalk Leader
- The Mid Louth Independent

=== Mayo ===
- Connaught Telegraph (owned by Celtic Media Group)
- The Mayo News (owned by Iconic Newspapers)
- Western People (owned by The Irish Times)

=== Meath ===
- The Meath Chronicle (owned by Celtic Media Group)
- The Meath Topic (owned by Topic Newspapers)

=== Offaly ===
- The Offaly Topic (owned by Topic Newspapers)
- The Midland Tribune (owned by Iconic Newspapers)
- The Offaly Independent (owned by Celtic Media Group)
- Tullamore Tribune (owned by Iconic Newspapers)

=== Roscommon ===
- Roscommon Herald (owned by The Irish Times)
- Roscommon People

=== Sligo ===
- The Northwest Express
- The Sligo Champion (owned by Mediahuis)
- Sligo Weekender (owned by Dorothy Crean)

=== Tipperary ===
- The Midland Tribune (owned by Iconic Newspapers)
- The Nationalist (owned by Iconic Newspapers)
- The Nenagh Guardian
- The Tipperary Star (owned by Iconic Newspapers)

=== Waterford ===
- The Dungarvan Leader
- The Dungarvan Observer
- The Munster Express
- Waterford News & Star (Owned by The Irish Times)
- Waterford Today (free newspaper, owned by Voice Media)

=== Westmeath ===
- The Athlone Topic (owned by Topic Newspapers)
- Westmeath Examiner (owned by Celtic Media Group)
- Westmeath Independent (owned by Celtic Media Group)
- Westmeath Topic (owned by Topic Newspapers)

=== Wexford ===
- The County Wexford Free Press
- The Enniscorthy Guardian (owned by Mediahuis)
- The Gorey Guardian (owned by Mediahuis)
- The New Ross Standard (owned by Mediahuis)
- The Wexford People (owned by Mediahuis)

=== Wicklow ===
- Bray People (owned by Mediahuis)
- Wicklow People (owned by Mediahuis)
- Wicklow Voice (free newspaper, owned by Voice Media)

== Political newspapers ==
- An Phoblacht – irregular magazine politically aligned to Sinn Féin
- Irish Republican News – online weekly newspaper
- LookLeft - bi-monthly political magazine produced by the Workers' Party.
- Saoirse Irish Freedom – monthly newspaper aligned to Republican Sinn Féin
- The Socialist – monthly newspaper politically aligned to the Socialist Party
- Socialist Voice – monthly newspaper published by the Communist Party of Ireland
- Socialist Worker – bi-weekly newspaper aligned to the Socialist Workers Party
- The Sovereign Nation - bi-monthly newspaper aligned to the 32 County Sovereignty Movement
- The Starry Plough – bi-monthly newspaper politically aligned to the Irish Republican Socialist Party
- Forward - sporadically published newspaper by the Connolly Youth Movement

=== Pan-regional ===
- The Avondhu – covers North East Cork, West Waterford, South Limerick and South Tipperary
- The Munster Express – covers the South East
- The Nationalist & Munster Advertiser
- Northwest Express – covers the 8 Northwest counties

=== University newspapers ===
==== Cork ====
- UCC Express – University College Cork

==== Dublin ====
- College Tribune – University College Dublin
- The College View – Dublin City University
- The Edition – Dublin Institute of Technology
- Trinity News – Trinity College Dublin
- The University Observer – University College Dublin
- The University Times – Trinity College Dublin

==== Galway ====
- Sin Newspaper – University of Galway

==== Limerick ====
- An Focal – University of Limerick

=== Minority newspapers ===
- Metro Éireann – multicultural paper for immigrants and ethnic minorities

(See also below in Foreign-language newspapers)

=== Online ===
- TheJournal.ie
- Broadsheet.ie
- The Ditch (website)

=== Other ===
- Iris Oifigiúil – official state gazette
- The Irish Catholic, weekly newspaper
- The Church of Ireland Gazette, monthly publication
- Methodist Newsletter - monthly
- Presbyterian Herald - monthly official publication of the Presbyterian Church in Ireland.
- Irish Farmers Journal
- The Irish Field

== Irish-language newspapers ==
=== Daily newspapers ===
- Tuairisc.ie (online)
- NÓS.ie (online)

=== Weekly newspapers ===
- Seachtain – Irish language newspaper which eventually replaced Foinse, included with the Wednesday Irish Independent
- Goitse – local weekly Irish language newspaper for the Gaeltacht parish of Gweedore.
- An Páipéar (in print and online)

=== Monthly newspapers ===
- Saol – Irish language monthly newspaper based in Dublin

=== Defunct ===
In the past there was one daily newspaper:

- Lá Nua, based in Belfast

There were two weekly newspapers:

- Gaelscéal – previously available every Friday
- Foinse – was distributed Wednesdays with the Irish Independent, replaced by Seachtain

==== College newspapers with columns in Irish ====
- The University Times (Trinity College Dublin student newspaper)
- UCC Express (University College Cork student newspaper)
- The College Tribune (University College Dublin Student Newspaper) – Irish Section
- The Edition (Dublin Institute of Technology student newspaper)
- An Focal (University of Limerick student newspaper)
- The College View (Dublin City University student newspaper)

== English-language papers with regular Irish-language columns ==
Many English-language newspapers have Irish-language columns, including:

- An Phoblacht
- Irish Independent – on Wednesdays includes the newspaper Seachtain
- Connaught Telegraph
- Evening Echo – weekly Irish-language segment
- Irish Echo
- Irish News
- The Irish Times - on Tuesdays includes the newspaper Scéal.
- The Irish Examiner - on Tuesdays includes the newspaper Scéal.

== Other languages ==
=== Catalan ===
- Diari Liffey – news from Ireland in Catalan

=== Russian ===
- Наша Газета (Nasha Gazeta) – paper targeted at speakers of the Russian language

=== Polish ===
- Nasz Glos
- Polska Gazeta
- Polski Express
- Polski Herald – special Polish edition of every Friday's Evening Herald
- StrefaÉire – Polish language newspaper for the Polish community in Ireland

== Closed newspapers, no longer published ==
=== Daily ===
- An Claidheamh Soluis – "The Sword of Light", see Gaelic League
- Cork Constitution – renamed 1873, ceased publication 1922
- Cork Free Press – founded 1910, ceased publication 1916
- The Clare Courier
- Daily Express – founded 1851, ceased general publication 1921
- Daily Ireland – launched in January 2005, ceased in September 2006
- The Daily News – opened and closed in 1982
- The Dublin Evening Mail – renamed the Evening Mail, closed in the 1960s
- The Evening News – opened in May 1996 and closed in September of the same year
- The Evening Press – closed in 1995
- The Evening Telegraph – closed 1924
- The Freeman's Journal – merged with the Irish Independent in 1924
- Irish Bulletin – official Irish Republic gazette; closed 1922
- The Irish Press – closed in 1995
- Limerick Standard
- Lá – the first Irish Gaelic medium daily paper, renamed Lá Nua, closed in 2008

=== Sunday and weekly ===
- Anois – closed in 1996
- Inniú – closed in 1984
- Ireland on Sunday – replaced with Irish Mail on Sunday 2006
- The Irish Citizen – closed 1920
- Irish Daily Star Sunday – closed January 2011
- The Irish Family – closed 2008
- An Gaedheal – closed 1937
- Metro Éireann - closed 2020
- Irish News of the World – closed July 2011
- The Sunday Journal
- The Sunday Press – closed in 1995
- Sunday Review – published in Dublin 1957–1963
- The Sunday Tribune – closed February 2011
- The United Irishman – founded 1899; closed 1906

=== Regional ===
- Athlone Advertiser (variant of Galway Advertiser)
- Athlone Voice
- Ballymun Concrete News
- The Cashel Advertiser
- The Cashel Gazette
- The Cavan Echo
- The Cavan Voice
- The Clare People
- The Clonmel Chronicle
- The Clonmel Herald
- The Clonmel Journal
- Connemara View – ceased publication in December 2010
- The Cork on Sunday – short-lived (late 1990s) Sunday newspaper for Metropolitan Cork
- The Cork Weekly – a free weekly paper for Metropolitan Cork incorporating the Douglas Weekly, ceased July 2009
- The Corkonian
- Donegal on Sunday
- Donegal Times (Closed in 2017)
- The Dublin Daily – renamed the Dublin Evening, a daily paper started in 2003 that ran for four months before running out of money
- Dublin Penny Journal
- The Dungarvan People and The Waterford People – sister papers, existed in 2008
- The East Cork Express
- East Cork Journal – launched September 2007. Ceased publication in 2020 during pandemic lockdown.
- The East Cork News – discontinued in 1991 after several years, was a sister publication of the Waterford News and Star (owned by Examiner/TCH)
- The East Cork Post – short-lived Youghal based newspaper in the mid-1980s
- The East Galway Democrat
- The Enniscorthy Echo
- Fingal Independent (owned by Independent News and Media)
- The Flying Post - First regular Dublin newspaper from 1699, mainly a reprint of a similar London newspaper
- The Galway Vindicator
- Galway First
- Galway Voice
- Galway Independent
- The Gorey Echo’’
- Herald AM
- Imokilly Monthly – a monthly newspaper in East Cork which appeared during 2009, a descendant of a previous publication, the Imokilly People
- Imokilly People – circulated in East Cork and South-West Waterford. Previously existed 1989 – July 2007 and reappeared briefly under new ownership in late 2008
- The Kildare Voice
- Kilkenny Advertiser – free newspaper
- The Kilkenny Voice
- The Kingdom
- The Leitrim Echo
- Letterkenny Leader – became the Letterkenny Post in 2005
- The Liffey Voice
- The Limerick Reporter
- Limerick Chronicle
- Limerick Independent
- Longford News (Now closed)
- Mayo Advertiser
- The Meath Echo
- The Meath Post
- The Meath Telegraph
- The Meath Weekender
- The Northern Standard
- Metro
- Midleton Post – existed from February until sometime in 2008
- Monaghan Post
- The Monaghan Voice
- The Mullingar Advertiser
- The Muskerry Herald – Ballincollig, County Cork
- North County Leader (Closed in 2017)
- The Naas Voice
- The New Ross Echo
- The Offaly Express
- Roscommon Champion (Now closed)
- The Democrat (Roscommon)(Newspaper stopped/disrupted by court action)
- The Roscrea People
- The Skibbereen Eagle – incorporated into The Southern Star
- The Sligo Independent – published in Sligo 1855–1921; changed name to Sligo Independent and West of Ireland Advertiser 1921–1961
- The Sligo Journal – sister paper of the Western Journal, published for Sligo 1977–1983
- The Sligo Post
- The Northside People (49.9% owned by Celtic Media Group)
- The Southside People (49.9% owned by Celtic Media Group)
- Tallaght Voice
- The Tipperary Advocate
- The Tipperary Free Press
- The Tipperary Leader
- The Tipperary Vindicator
- The Tipperary Voice
- The Tipperaryman
- The Waterford Chronicle (1804–1872)
- The Waterford People and The Dungarvan People – sister papers, existed in 2008
- The Western Journal
- The Wexford Echo
- The Youghal Tribune – sister newspaper of the Dungarvan Observer
- The Cavan Times
- North Wicklow Times
- South Wicklow Times

=== Other ===
- Irish War News

== See also ==
- List of online newspaper archives
- Radio in Ireland
- Television in Ireland
