= Leinster Leader =

Irish newspaper

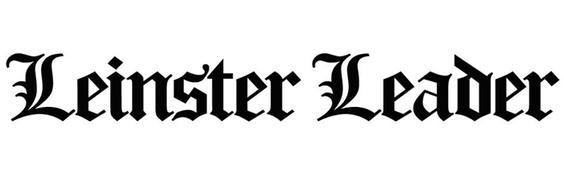
- Type: Weekly newspaper
- Owner: Iconic Newspapers
- Editor: Laura Coates
- Founded: 1880
- Language: English
- Headquarters: Naas
- Website: leinsterleader.ie

The Leinster Leader is a newspaper published in Naas, County Kildare, Ireland. Johnston Press bought the Leinster Leader Group in 2005. The Leinster Leader Group, as well as publishing the Naas-based Leinster Leader also published The Dundalk Democrat, Leinster Express (Portlaoise), Limerick Leader, Offaly Express, and the Tallaght Echo. The paper is currently owned by Iconic Newspapers, who acquired Johnston Press' titles in Ireland in 2014.

== History ==
The paper was founded 1880 in Naas, County Kildare, as the Leinster Leader and Central Counties Commercial and Agricultural Adviser by Patrick Cahill, LLB, who was its first editor in August 1880. Patrick Cahill was an Irish Nationalist, Land League Activist and supporter of Home Rule, he was jailed under the Protection of Person and Property Act 1881.

One of the early majority shareholder of The Leader in its early days was the MP for North Kildare James Laurence Carew.

John Wyse Power, a supporter of nationalist causes and a founding member of the GAA, succeeded Cahill as the second editor of the paper for a year and a half.

Another editor of the paper were Seumus and his brother Michael O'Kelly, both prominent Nationalists, Michael succeeded Seamus as Editor of the Leader, in 1912, but upon his arrest in 1916, Seamus resumed the editorship briefly.

Recent editors have included Michael Sheeran (1997-2007) and Senator John Whelan.

== Circulation ==
According to ABC, circulation declined to 5,738 for the period July 2012 to December 2012, this represented a fall of 12% on a year-on-year basis.
