= Leitrim Post =

- Type: Weekly newspaper
- Format: Tabloid
- Owner: River Media
- Founded: 2007
- Ceased publication: 2009 due to the Great Recession
- Headquarters: Carrick-on-Shannon, County Leitrim
- Circulation: 4,014

The Leitrim Post was a local newspaper covering County Leitrim in northwest Ireland. The paper was one of a series published in the region by River Media and stable-mates included the Donegal Post and Sligo Post. For the first half of 2007 the paper's circulation figures averaged at 4,014. The newspaper followed the same template as other papers in the River Media group with a focus on human interest stories and an emphasis on sport. It was based in Carrick-on-Shannon and competed with another paper called the Leitrim Observer. It was edited by journalist Colin Regan who was also a member of the Leitrim senior football team at the time. The Leitrim Post ceased publication in 2009 due to a decline in advertising revenue and a reduction in staffing levels as a result of the economic crash.
