= Conor Kane (journalist) =

Irish journalist

- Born: Conor Kane; Fethard, County Tipperary, Ireland
- Occupation: Journalist
- Years active: 1994–present
- Employer: RTÉ
- Notable credit(s): RTÉ News; Irish Independent; Irish Examiner; The Nationalist; Wicklow People; Roscommon Herald; South East Correspondent

Conor Kane is an Irish journalist. He is South East correspondent for RTÉ News since June 2019. He previously worked for the Irish Independent, Irish Examiner, The Nationalist, Wicklow People and Roscommon Herald.

== Career ==
Kane began his career as a reporter for Roscommon Herald in April 1994. From July 1996 to September 2003, Kane worked for the Wicklow People, and began reporting for The Nationalist in Clonmel until November 2006 when he joined the Irish Examiner to become a senior news reporter. Kane joined the Irish Independent and worked as South East correspondent from December 2008 to August 2010.

Prior to joining Raidió Teilifís Éireann, he was a freelance journalist reporting on news and sport in the south-east of Ireland. Kane was appointed South East correspondent for RTÉ News and Current Affairs on 20 May 2019 after his predecessor Damien Tiernan stepped down in January 2019, and has reported on counties Waterford, Wexford, Wicklow, Tipperary, Kilkenny and Carlow.

== Personal life ==
Kane was born in Fethard, County Tipperary, Ireland. He graduated from Dublin Institute of Technology in 1993 and holds a journalism degree. Kane has one daughter and four sons.
