= Finn Valley Post =

Irish newspaper

- Type: Weekly newspaper (freesheet)
- Format: Tabloid
- Owner: Iconic Newspapers
- Founded: July 2007
- Language: English
- Headquarters: Ballybofey, County Donegal

The Finn Valley Post was a free local newspaper in County Donegal, Ireland, based in the town of Ballybofey. The paper was first published on 18 July 2007 by the River Media group, which produced other local titles such as the Donegal Post and Letterkenny Post. The newspaper, which covers much of east and central County Donegal, derives its name from the River Finn which flows through the area. In November 2018, River Media sold the newspaper (along with six other regional titles) to Iconic Newspapers.
