= Sligo Post =

- Type: Weekly free newspaper
- Format: Tabloid
- Owner: River Media
- Founded: 16 May 2007
- Headquarters: Sligo, County Sligo, Ireland
- Website: Website (archived 2007)

The Sligo Post was a free tabloid newspaper published in Sligo, County Sligo, Ireland. The newspaper specialised in local news and sport, as well as sections such as property, motoring, entertainment, farming and fashion.

The paper was first published on 16 May 2007, and was a weekly publication issued on Wednesdays. The paper ceased production in June 2010.

The newspaper was owned by River Media, which also published The Kildare Post, The Derry News, The Donegal Post and The Letterkenny Post.
