= Eugene McHale (Gaelic footballer) =

Irish Gaelic footballer, manager, and referee

Personal information
- Born: County Mayo, Ireland
- Occupation: Officer with the Garda Síochána

Sport
- Sport: Gaelic football
Inter-county
- Years: County
- Mayo

Eugene McHale is a former Gaelic footballer who played at senior level for the Mayo county team. He also played for Knockmore, his home team, and won five Championship medals.

During his playing career, he was one of the most recognisable footballers in the province of Connacht. He scored a goal for Mayo against Kerry in the 1981 All-Ireland Senior Football Championship semi-final.

He moved to Cliffoney, County Sligo, in 1980 and has lived there ever since. He served as a guard in nearby Grange until his retirement and is a columnist for the Sligo Weekender.

McHale has also refereed matches and managed teams. In 2001, he made history when he became the first person from outside the parish to be appointed manager of the Easkey senior team.
