= Patrick Cahill =

Patrick Cahill or Pat Cahill may refer to:

- Patrick Cahill (Sinn Féin politician) (1884–1946), Irish politician and newspaper editor
- Patrick Cahill (Irish Nationalist) (died 1886), Irish newspaper editor and political activist
- Patrick Cahill (Fine Gael politician), Irish Lord Mayor of Dublin from 1947 to 1948 as a member of Fine Gael
- Patrick Cahill (Australian hunter) (c. 1863–1923), Australian buffalo hunter and protector of Aborigines in the Northern Territory
- Pat Cahill, British comedian
- Pat Cahill (footballer) (1919–1966), Australian rules footballer
