= Inish Times =

- Type: Weekly newspaper
- Format: Tabloid
- Owner(s): Iconic Newspapers
- Founded: 1999
- Headquarters: Buncrana, County Donegal
- Website: www.inishtimes.com

The Inish Times is a local Irish newspaper based in Buncrana on the Inishowen peninsula in County Donegal. It serves the Inishowen area and is also sold in nearby areas such as Derry and Letterkenny. The paper, which is published each Tuesday, was first started in 1999 and is now part of the River Media group of publications which include the Letterkenny Post and the Donegal Post. The editor, Catriona Gallen, was at the helm at the paper's relaunch in 2010. The sports section is edited by Johnny Craig who received a Football Association of Ireland Communications Award in 2011 for Best Regional Coverage.

In November 2018, River Media sold the title to Iconic Newspapers.
