= Conor Kane =

Conor Kane may refer to:

- Conor Kane (footballer) (born 1998), Irish left back from Palmerstown, County Dublin
- Conor Kane (journalist), Irish journalist from Fethard, County Tipperary
