= Iconic Newspapers =

Newspaper company

- Type: Private limited company
- Industry: Media
- Founded: 29 November 2013
- Headquarters: 30 Hatch Lane, Dublin / 47 Great Marlborough Street, London
- Key people: Malcolm Denmark
- Products: Publishing of Newspapers and online media.
- Website: mediaforcegroup.co.uk

Iconic Newspapers is a British-owned newspaper company that publishes over 20 regional newspapers in Ireland. Iconic Newspapers are owned by Mediaforce who are majority owned by British businessman Malcolm Denmark. Iconic Newspapers hold their newspaper assets in a subsidiary called Formpress Publishing.

Mediaforce acts as an intermediary for the vast majority of Irish newspapers and advertising agencies. If agencies want to place ads for their national clients in newspapers, they mostly go through Mediaforce.

In 2014, Iconic Newspapers acquired Johnston Press Ireland. Johnston Press Ireland was formed in 2005 following the purchase of Scottish Radio Holdings's newspapers known as Score Press by Johnston Press in 2005 for £155 million. In the same year, Johnston Press Ireland also purchased the Leinster Leader Group (just after Leinster Leader Group had purchased Tallaght Publishing Ltd), who published six titles, for €138.6 million.

The company is based in Naas, County Kildare.

== History ==
In May 2017, it was reported that Iconic Newspapers may bid to acquire some Landmark Media Investments regional titles. Iconic Newspapers did not proceed with this acquisition.

In September 2017, it was reported that Iconic Newspapers managing director, Joe Flaherty, had been selected to run for Fianna Fáil in Longford-Westmeath.

In November 2017, it was reported that Iconic Newspapers were making staff redundant at the Donegal Democrat.

In January 2018, the 2017 accounts were published. Revenues at Formpress Publishing Ltd declined by 2pc from €13m to €12.6m. Numbers employed by the company last year reduced from 165 to 161 with staff costs declining from €6.84m to €6.59m.

In November 2018, it was announced that Iconic Newspapers had acquired 7 titles from River Media.

In November 2018, Fine Gael Senator Paudie Coffey sued Iconic Newspapers over an article written in the Kilkenny People.

In January 2019, the accounts up to March 2018 were published. Revenues at Formpress Publishing Ltd. declined by 3pc, from €12.6m to €12.2m. Numbers employed by the company last year increased from 161 to 163. Profits declined 6%.

In March 2019, Iconic Newspapers settled a defamation action from an ex-minister over an article in the Tipperary Star.

In April 2019, Iconic Newspapers acquired two newspaper titles from Alpha Newspaper Group. The acquisition was subject to Competition Authority approval. In October 2019, the Competition Authority approved the transaction subject to conditions. The Irish Government needed to approve the acquisition next.

In August 2019, Fine Gael Senator Paudie Coffey settled his High Court action with Iconic Newspapers.

In October 2019, it was reported that Ionic Newspapers were in advance talks to acquire The Munster Express.

In March 2020, the accounts up to 31 March 2019 were published. The results were affected by the acquisitions. Numbers employed by the company reduced from 153 to 149.

In March 2020, Iconic Newspapers let staff go due to lack of newspaper advertising due to the coronavirus pandemic. The National Union of Journalists (NUJ) said that Iconic Newspapers "has laid off dozens of journalists, made a number of staff compulsorily redundant and temporarily shut two newspapers".

In December 2020, it was announced that Iconic Newspapers' owners Mediaforce was subscribing £6 million in loan notes towards the sale of JPI Media Publishing Limited to National World plc. JPIMedia is the third largest publisher of regional newspapers and websites in the United Kingdom, with over 100 newspapers including 13 daily newspapers.

In January 2021, further staff cuts occurred at Iconic Newspapers publications such as the Tipperary Star.

In October 2021, it was announced that David Fordham had taken up a directorship role with National World, plc, at the request of Mediaforce, which is the owner of Iconic Newspapers. It was revealed in the same report that Mediaforce owns 26pc of National World.

In September 2022, it was announced Iconic Media Group will purchase The Mayo News.

In December 2024, it was reported that Iconic Media Group are leading the race to acquire the Connacht Tribune.

In December 2025, it was reported that Iconic Media Group are seeking to acquire Alpha Newspaper Group who owns 13 newspapers and websites, all outside Belfast. Its titles include the Newry Democrat, Mid Ulster Courier, and the Ballymena Guardian. Alpha also owns the YourAdsNI advertising platform that focuses on the Northern Ireland market.

== Current Irish newspaper titles ==
As of 2024, the company's titles included:

- Derry News (acquired from River Media)
- County Derry Post (acquired from River Media)
- Donegal Democrat (acquired from Johnston Press)
- Donegal People's Press (acquired from Johnston Press)
- Donegal Post (acquired from River Media)
- Dundalk Democrat (acquired from Johnston Press)
- Finn Valley Post (acquired from River Media)
- Inish Times (acquired from River Media)
- Kildare Post (acquired from River Media)
- Kilkenny People (acquired from Johnston Press)
- The Kilkenny Reporter (launched by Iconic Newspapers, not connected to closed title called Kilkenny Reporter)
- Leinster Express (acquired from Johnston Press)
- Leinster Leader (acquired from Johnston Press)
- Leitrim Observer (acquired from Johnston Press)
- Letterkenny People (acquired from Johnston Press)
- Letterkenny Post (acquired from River Media)
- The Limerick Chronicle (acquired from Johnston Press)
- Limerick Leader (acquired from Johnston Press)
- Longford Leader (acquired from Johnston Press)
- Mayo News (acquired from Dermot Berry)
- Midland Tribune (acquired from Alpha Newspaper Group)
- The Nationalist (Tipperary) (acquired from Johnston Press)
- Tipperary Star (acquired from Johnston Press
- Tullamore Tribune (acquired from Alpha Newspaper Group)

== Former newspaper titles ==
- Limerick Chronicle (now a supplement in the Limerick Leader, not a standalone title)
- Offaly Express

== Websites ==
- Carlow Live
- Cork Live
- Offaly Express (former newspaper title)
- Derry Now
- Donegal Live (involves the news teams of the Donegal Democrat, Donegal Post, Donegal People's Press and Inish Times)
- ÉireBheo
- Kildare Now
- Tipperary Live (The Nationalist and the Tipperary Star)
- Waterford Live

Iconic Newspapers run 23 websites, which are mainly websites linked to their newspaper titles.
