= Elizabeth Somers =

- Lasarfhiona Ní Shamhraidin
- Born: 14 October 1881; Waterford, Ireland
- Died: 28 December 1934 (aged 53); Dublin

Elizabeth Somers (14 October 1881 – 28 December 1934) was an Irish republican, writer, and industrial revivalist.

== Early life ==
Elizabeth Somers was born in Waterford city on 14 October 1881. Her parents were William Somers, post office engineer, and his wife Elizabeth (née Walsh). Somers had at least 3 brothers. The family moved to Cork city in 1883 when her father was transferred there, where Somers attended a convent school. Her father died in 1891, and her mother was appointed postmistress of Whitegate, County Cork. As a pupil, Somers wrote for the children's magazine St. Patrick's edited by William O'Brien, even winning prizes. The family moved again in 1901, when Somers' mother became postmistress of Belmullet, County Mayo until 1908. Somers was moved by the poverty she saw there, and was elected as a poor law guardian for Belmullet shortly after she arrived there. She went on to become a supporter of Sinn Féin, writing numerous articles for Arthur Griffith's journals. She used her name in Irish as her pen name, Lasarfhiona Ní Shamhraidin, Eilis Lasarfhiona or just Lasarfhiona. Somers also wrote for The Mayo News, and in the Irish Peasant with a regular column, "An grianán".

== Irish republicanism and advocacy ==
Somers moved to Dalkey, County Dublin in 1908 with her mother who was again taking a position as the town postmistress. From here Somers was an active member of The Gaelic League and Sinn Féin, as well as a supporter of Cumann na mBan and the Irish Volunteers. She eventually became the secretary of the local Cumann na mBan unit. Somers' campaign against Irish recruitment into the British Army in 1915 led to her mother losing her job as postmistress of Dalkey. This made her the first civil servant to lose her job due to her association with Irish republicanism. Her persistent lobbying of Matthew Nathan through correspondence led to her mother being reinstated at the end of World War I. Her brother, D.C. Somers, was sentenced to five years' penal servitude due to his participation in Easter 1916, and lost his job in the civil service. These led to the family suffering financially. Both her brothers, D.C. and Michael, served in the IRA during the Irish War of Independence. Somers was a public speaker and raised funds for Sinn Féin from 1917 onwards.

Somers was appointed secretary of the Dublin Industrial Development Association in 1917, an organisation which went on to become the National Agricultural and Industrial Development Association (NAIDA). This was a lobbying group for small Irish businesses, advocating for protective tariffs to aid in the development of Irish industry. At the offices of the NAIDA at 3 St Stephen's Green, Somers oversaw a permanent exhibition of Irish Industries. Until her death, Somers was the public face and administrator of the NAIDA. While serving as the minister for industry and commerce, Seán Lemass described Somers as the NAIDA's "directing spirit" and noted her "heroic work". She was the instigator of the "Buy Irish" campaigns, encouraging the expansion and development of Irish industries. Somers was against the 1921 Anglo-Irish Treaty, switching her allegiance to Fianna Fáil.

Along with her unmarried brother, Michael, Somers lived with her mother. Somers developed heart disease in 1931 due to high blood pressure, leading to her sudden death from a heart attack on 28 December 1934.
