= Donegal Times =

Irish local newspaper

- Type: Community Newspaper Published Fortnightly
- Format: Tabloid
- Owner: Liam Hyland
- Editor: Liam Hyland
- Founded: 24 March 1989
- Ceased publication: 2017
- Language: English
- Headquarters: The Diamond, Donegal Town

The Donegal Times was a local newspaper in County Donegal, Ireland. The paper was based in Donegal Town. The paper acted as a newsletter, covering mainly community and social issues affecting the town and its immediate environs. It was first printed in March 1989 as a special supplement in the Donegal Democrat, then a stand-alone publication, ordinarily published on the second and fourth Wednesday of the month. Only one edition was published in December.

The Donegal Times was one of three papers that had a base in Donegal Town, the other two being the Donegal Democrat and the Donegal Post. It used a sketch of Donegal Castle as its logo. The paper eventually stopped updating its website with stories and now acts only as an archive of older articles.

The paper regularly took a stance on issues that have polarized the community. High-profile examples are rows that erupted over reports on the Donegal Town Mart and the Donegal Bay Waterbus.

Liam Hyland, the editor, died on 9 September 2017, and the paper ceased publication.
