= Daniel William Cahill =

Irish physicist

Daniel William Cahill (November 28, 1796 – October 28, 1864) was a Roman Catholic preacher, lecturer, writer and educator in Ireland and the United States.

== Biography ==
Daniel Cahill was born at Ashfield, Arles, Queens County, Ireland. He was the third son of Daniel Cahill, a civil engineer, and Catherine Brett. He was sent to Carlow College as a lay student, and in 1816 entered Maynooth, where he became proficient in natural philosophy and languages. He was ordained a Catholic priest after he had passed through the Dunboyne establishment.

In 1825, Cahill was appointed professor of natural philosophy (mathematics, physics, chemistry and astronomy) at Carlow College, where he taught for some years. He then opened a school at Seapoint, Williamstown, which he conducted from 1835 to 1841. Meanwhile, he wrote largely for the press, and for a time edited the Dublin Telegraph. He became a distinguished preacher and lecturer, and his vigorous attacks on the government and the Established Church of Ireland extended his reputation. In December 1859 he visited the United States, where he lectured on astronomy and other scientific subjects and preached in many American and Canadian cities.

As he generally gave his services for religious and charitable purposes, large sums of money were raised by him for Catholic projects. He was of commanding presence, being six feet five inches in height (196 cm), and handsome.

=== Death and legacy ===
He was buried in Boston, but his body was exhumed in 1885 and taken to Ireland, where it was reburied in Glasnevin Cemetery, Dublin, on his grave is a statute of him.

The Land League campaigner, nationalist and newspaper publisher Patrick Cahill (who had studied in Carlow) was his nephew, as was Thomas Cahill, who became president of the Jesuit College in Melbourne, Australia.

== Works ==
His writings consist chiefly of lectures and addresses, with some letters to prominent Protestants. Cahill's publisher in Dublin during the 1850s was John F. Nugent. His letters would occasionally appear in the Freeman's Journal.

Works and letters were collected and first published by A. Franchi in New York, 1854, under the full title: ""First American edition of the works of the Rev. D. W. Cahill, D.D. : the highly distinguished Irish priest, patriot and scholar : containing a brief sketch of his life, the most important addresses, speeches, controversial sermons &c. delivered in Ireland, England and Scotland : together with his celebrated letters to Lord John Russell, Lord Palmerston, the Duke of Wellington, the Earl of Derby, the Earl of Carlisle, &c. &c. &c. : being the most interesting work ever presented to the Catholic public.". Another edition was published the following year in Boston by P. Donahoe, then in 1879 and 1885 by D. & J. Sadlier.
