= The Diamond, Donegal =

Main square in Donegal Town, Ireland

Coordinates: 54.653889°N 8.110278°W

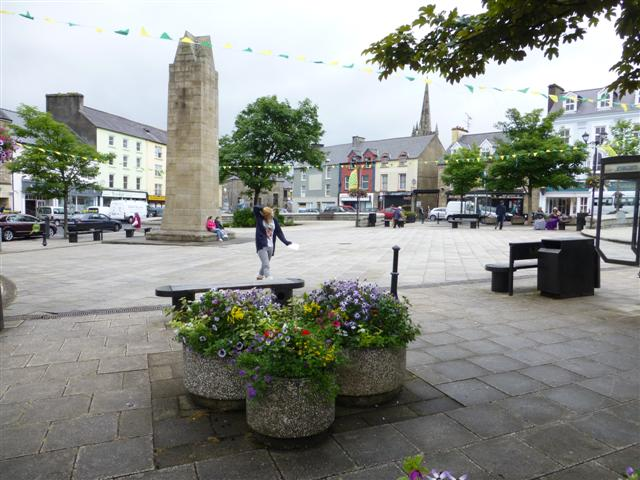
Within the Diamond, featuring the Four Masters obelisk.

The Diamond is the main square in Donegal Town. It forms the town centre with an extensive pedestrian area with seating and trees. It includes a prominent 'obelisk' unveiled in 1938 celebrating 'the Four Masters', four Gaelic historians led by Brother Mícheál Ó Cléirigh who wrote The Annals of the Four Masters between 1630 and 1636. The Plantation of Ulster and the establishment of 'plantation towns' often included a meeting area or market place (often with a 'mercat cross') in the town centre.

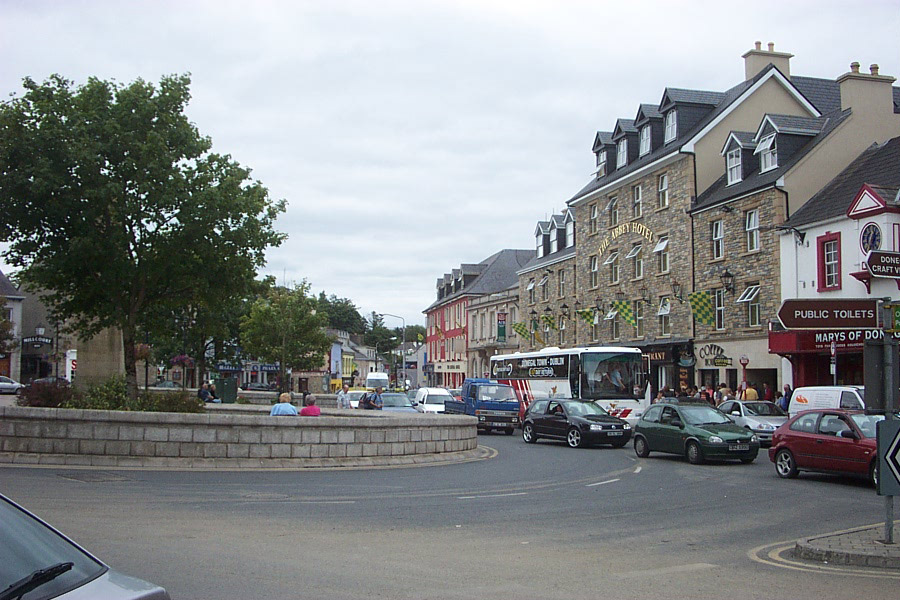
The Diamond and The Abbey Hotel in 2005.
