= Westmeath Topic =

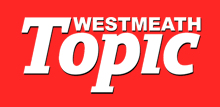
- Type: Weekly newspaper
- Format: Tabloid (Wednesday)
- Owner: Topic Newspapers
- Founded: 11 November 1971; 54 years ago
- Headquarters: 6 Dominick Street; Mullingar; County Westmeath; Ireland; N91 VHW7
- Website: topic.ie

The Westmeath Topic is a weekly newspaper founded in Mullingar, Ireland in November 1971. It was established by Dick Hogan, Albert Morris and Tommy Kiernan, each of whom had previously worked with the Westmeath Examiner.

Beginning as a small A4-size magazine under the name "TOPIC", the publication subsequently became a weekly newspaper circulated primarily in the Midlands Region.

It is one of a small number of Irish titles which are still printed, published and owned locally. The newspaper is owned by the Topic Newspapers group, which also publishes the Athlone Topic, Meath Topic and Offaly Topic titles.
