= Finn Valley Voice =

Irish newspaper

The Finn Valley Voice is a local newspaper published in the Finn Valley region of County Donegal in Ireland. Founded in 1994, it is based in Ballybofey. It is independently owned by four women. The newspaper is one of two to be based in Ballybofey, competing with the Finn Valley Post, and covers several other urban areas such as Stranorlar, Lifford, Castlefin and Fintown. The Finn Valley Voice is not assessed for circulation by the Audited Bureau of Circulations (ABC).
