= John Whelan (Irish politician) =

Irish politician (born 1961)

Senator
- In office 25 May 2011 – 8 June 2016
- Constituency: Labour Panel

Personal details
- Born: 24 March 1961 (age 65) Portlaoise, County Laois, Ireland
- Party: Labour Party
- Occupation: Journalist, Editor, Politician

John Whelan (born 24 March 1961) is an Irish Labour Party politician and former member of Seanad Éireann.

A former journalist, Whelan was editor of the Leinster Express newspaper. He joined the Labour Party in 2010 and was selected as that party's candidate for the Laois–Offaly constituency at the 2011 general election. The selection convention was highly controversial, with the convention itself ending after 15 minutes in "total chaos". A number of members left the Labour Party and joined the Socialist Party and contested the constituency unsuccessfully while a number of others canvassed for Sinn Féin candidate Brian Stanley. Whelan polled 5,802 votes (7.8%) being beaten to the final seat by Fianna Fáil's Seán Fleming.

He was elected to the 24th Seanad on the Labour Panel in April 2011. In 2016, he again unsuccessfully ran for a Dáil seat in Laois.

Whelan works as a PR consultant as Communicate Ireland along with journalist John Drennan.
