= Kilkenny People =

Newspaper in Ireland

- Type: Weekly Newspaper
- Founder: Edward Thomas Keane
- Editor: Sam Matthews
- Language: English
- Headquarters: 34 High Street, Kilkenny City
- City: Kilkenny
- Website: kilkennypeople.ie

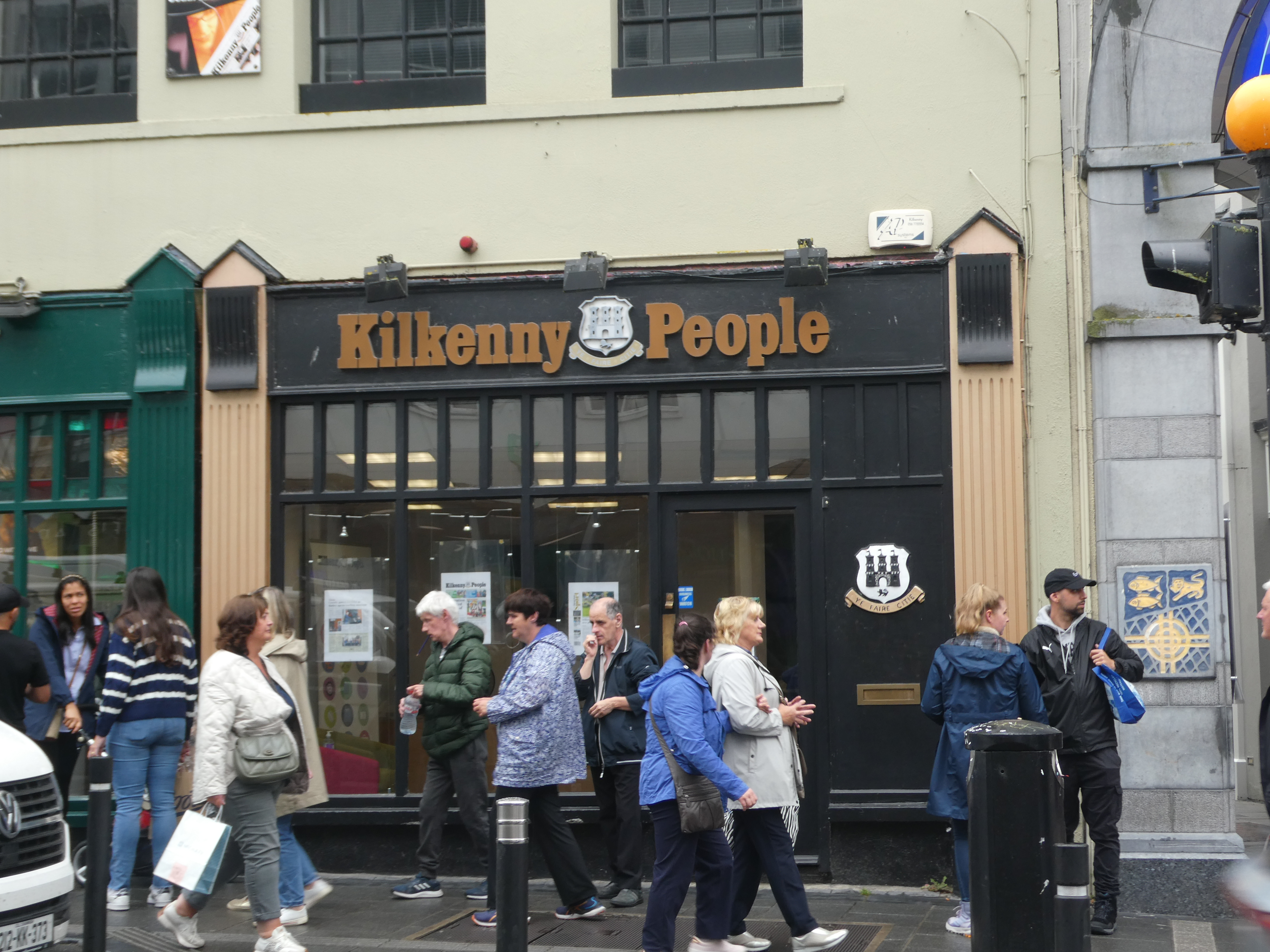
Newspaper offices

The Kilkenny People is a local newspaper circulated in County Kilkenny, Ireland.

Popular in Kilkenny City and County, the newspaper competes with The Munster Express in the south of the county. The Kilkenny People is published on Wednesdays every week and is currently owned by Iconic Newspapers, which acquired Johnston Press's titles in Ireland in 2014. The paper is printed in multiple sections, dealing primarily with news, property, motoring, arts, farming and sport. The newspaper is also known for its coverage of District and Circuit Court sittings. Originally set up as a newspaper for supporters of Charles Stewart Parnell, it survived and prospered while others folded and closed.

In 1919, British Forces removed the printing press and printing equipment from the newspaper's offices in Kilkenny City. This move prevented messages of Irish Independence being communicated throughout the region. The move caused public outrage at the time however it was not long before the newspaper was back printing again.

Throughout the 20th Century, The Kilkenny People chronicled major events in Irish history from a local perspective, including the Irish War of Independence, the Civil War, the foundation of the Irish Free State, and Ireland's evolving role within Europe. The newspaper has played a key role in providing comprehensive local coverage of elections, court sittings, county council meetings, and major civic and sporting events.

The paper is currently edited by Sam Matthews. Previous editors include Brian Keyes, Tom Molloy, Sean Hurley and John Kerry Keane.

Reporters include Christopher Dunne, Mary Cody, Liam Kelly O'Rourke, Sian Moloughney and Robert Cribbin.

James Joyce referred to it in his novel Ulysses.

== Circulation ==
Circulation has been on the decline in recent years. According to the Audit Bureau of Circulations, the paper had an average weekly circulation of 17,578 for the first six months of 2006. Circulation declined to 10,591 for the period July 2012 to December 2012, this represented a fall of 8% on a year-on-year basis. In 2024, it was reported that Formpress Publishing, part of Iconic Media group, which owns The Kilkenny People and Kilkenny Live, recorded pretax profits of almost €1.7 million in the year to the end of September 2023.

== Kilkenny Live ==
In 2022, the online website for the newspaper rebranded from Kilkenny People to Kilkenny Live, to reflect the fact that 'news can be covered live, in the moment, and can be shared instantly'. Kilkenny Live has a strong focus on hyper-local news and aims to bridge the gap between legacy readers and a younger, digital-first audience. Content Editor (Digital) for Kilkenny Live is Christopher Dunne.
