= Cork Independent (newspaper) =

Free newspaper in Cork, Ireland

- Type: Weekly newspaper
- Format: Tabloid
- Owner(s): IFN Group Newspapers
- Editor: Brian Hayes Curtin
- Headquarters: Blackpool, Cork.
- Circulation: 21,009 (2013)
- Website: www.corkindependent.com

The Cork Independent is a free newspaper in Cork, Ireland. The paper is published weekly and contains local news, health and beauty, business, opinion, social events, entertainment, motoring and property as well as input from a number of columnists.

The Cork Independent is published by the IFN Group, which previously published the Galway Independent until the Galway Independent went into liquidation in September 2017.

The newspaper has been published under the Cork Independent masthead since 2007, having previously operating under the name Inside Cork.

The newspaper is printed (but not owned) by Celtic Media Group.
