= Damien Tiernan =

Irish journalist

- Born: 1970 (age 54–55); Newtownmountkennedy, County Wicklow, Ireland
- Education: University College Dublin
- Occupation: RTÉ News South East Correspondent
- Years active: 1993–present
- Notable credit(s): Wicklow People; New Ross Standard; RTÉ News
- Spouse: Louise Tiernan (m. 2001; div. 2021)
- Children: 2

Damien Tiernan (born 1970) is an Irish journalist. He was the South East Correspondent for RTÉ News from 1996 to 2019. He resigned from RTÉ in January 2019 to work with Waterford Local Radio.

Prior to working for RTÉ he worked as a reporter for the Wicklow People and New Ross Standard. Damien was educated at Presentation College, in Bray, and University College Dublin studying English and Philosophy.
