= Drogheda Leader =

- Drogheda City's free newspaper
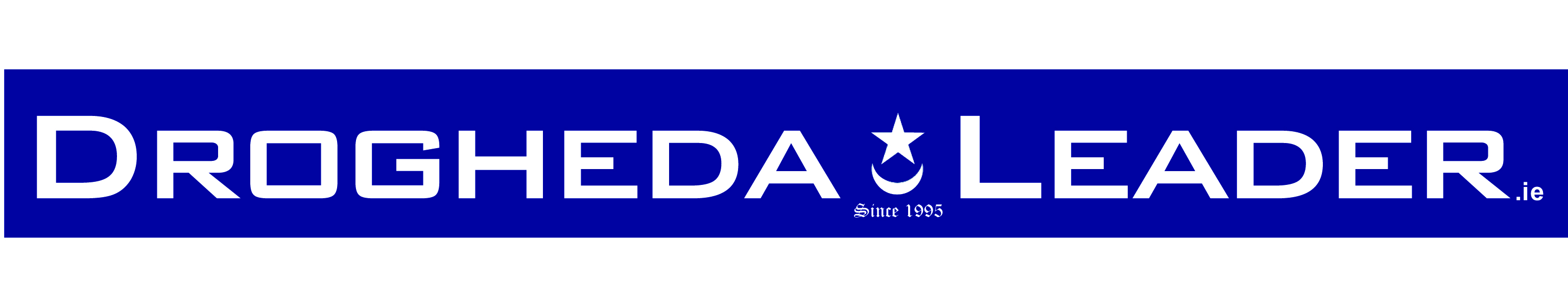
- Type: Newspaper
- Format: Newsprint and online
- Owner(s): Drogheda Leader
- News editor: Gordon Hatch
- Founded: June 1995; 30 years ago
- Headquarters: Laurence Street, Drogheda
- Website: www.droghedaleader.ie

The Drogheda Leader is a regional newspaper published in Drogheda, County Louth, which serves Drogheda, East Meath and Mid-Louth. The newspaper is printed (but not owned) by Celtic Media Group.

== History ==
The newspaper was established in 1995 with an initial circulation of 12,000. It expanded rapidly into one of the North East of Ireland's largest newspapers with a circulation of 29,000 newspapers weekly. A Market Research Bureau of Ireland (MRBI) readership poll in October 2009 showed the newspaper was the market leader in the Drogheda region with 84% readership, compared with 53% readership of the other regional newspaper Drogheda Independent.

In 2009, MRBI stated 'Of all the publications surveyed the highest readership is achieved by the Drogheda Leader, 84% of the catchment area claimed to have read or looked at an issue in the last week, the gap between the Drogheda Leader and Drogheda Independent has widened since 2002 research'.

The newspaper is published in a printed and online format in full colour on each of its pages and carries a variety of local news and advertising features.
