= Seumas O'Kelly =

Irish journalist, fiction writer, poet, and playwright

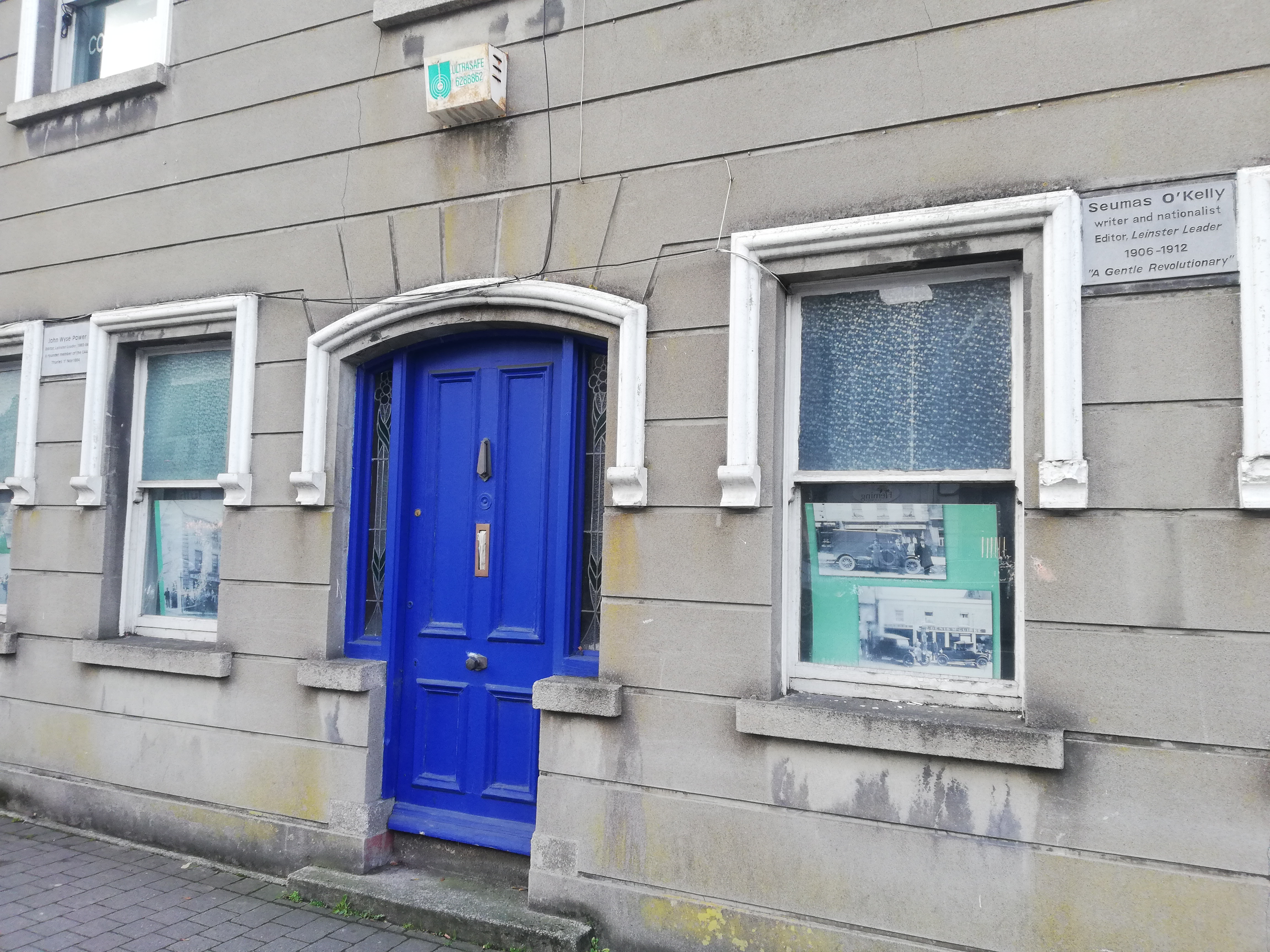
Former Leinster Leader offices on Naas's Main Street, with a memorial plaque to O'Kelly

Seumas O'Kelly (1881 – 14 November 1918) was an Irish journalist, fiction writer, poet, and playwright.

Born in Loughrea, County Galway, O'Kelly was educated locally and began his career as a journalist with the Cork newspaper Southern Star. He moved from The Southern Star to the Leinster Leader in Naas where he remained as editor until he went to work in 1916 for Nationality, the Sinn Féin party newspaper. Michael O'Kelly, his more militant brother, took over at the Leader in 1912, but was interned after the April 1916 Easter Rising. Seumas returned to the Leader for a brief stint. There is a plaque in his honour outside the Leader's offices which reads "Seumas O'Kelly – a gentle revolutionary". He wrote numerous plays, short stories, and novels. His short story "The Weaver's Grave" was adapted into a radio play, by Mícheál Ó hAodha, which won the Prix Italia for Radio Drama in 1961.

O'Kelly was a friend of the Irish nationalist Arthur Griffith, founder of both the political party Sinn Féin and its newspaper Nationality. He died prematurely of a heart attack following a raid on the paper's headquarters at Harcourt St by British security forces.

== Prose fiction ==
These three books are available in digital copies at HathiTrust as of November 2018.

- Waysiders: Stories of Connacht (Dublin: The Talbot Press and London: T. Fisher Unwin, 1917) – 10 stories
- The Lady of Deerpark (London: Methuen, 1917)
- The Golden Barque and The Weaver's Grave (Talbot, 1919) – 2 novellas
- The Leprechaun of Killmeen (Dublin: Martin Lester, 1920) – novella
- Irish Short Stories by Seamus O' Kelly (Cork: The Mercier Press, 2024)
