= Westmeath Examiner =

Newspaper in Ireland

- Type: Weekly newspaper
- Format: Compact; previously broadsheet
- Owner(s): Celtic Media Group
- Editor: Brian O'Loughlin
- Founded: 1882; 143 years ago
- Language: English
- Headquarters: Blackhall Place, Mullingar, County Westmeath; N91 V2NT
- Website: westmeathexaminer.ie/

The Westmeath Examiner is a weekly newspaper in County Westmeath, Ireland. It was founded in 1882.

The Westmeath Examiner is a sister paper of the Westmeath Independent which circulates in the Athlone area of the county. The Westmeath Examiner circulates in the north of the county and is based in Mullingar, the county town of County Westmeath. In May 2004, both papers were sold by their owners Martin Nally and Ronald Carroll to Celtic Media Group - a subsidiary of the Scottish owned Dunfermline Press - along with the third sister paper Offaly Independent. On 16 May 2015, The Westmeath Examiner saw a change from broadsheet to compact format.

In June 2012, the Irish management team of Celtic Media Group acquired the business and assets of the group for €5.5 million.

Other Irish newspaper titles that are part of the same stable include The Anglo Celt, in Cavan; The Meath Chronicle in Navan; and, since May 2014, The Connaught Telegraph.

According to the Audit Bureau of Circulations, the paper had an average weekly circulation of 9,687 during the first six months of 2006. For the same period in 2011, it had an average weekly circulation of 5,719, a fall that was in line with industry trends, which, broadly, endured sudden sharp declines in paid-for sales. However, following a move from a Wednesday publication date to a Tuesday, and a change to its digital offering, the newspaper saw renewed growth in paid-for sales.

== See also ==
- List of Irish newspapers
