= Offaly Independent =

Irish newspaper

- Format: Broadsheet until 2013 now Tabloid.
- Language: English
- Headquarters: Patrick Street, Tullamore
- City: Tullamore
- Country: Ireland
- Website: offalyindependent.ie

The Offaly Independent is a newspaper that covers Tullamore, County Offaly, Ireland and the surrounding area. It is published by Celtic Media Group.

== History ==
The Offaly Independent was first printed in 1894 as the Tullamore & King's Co. Independent intended to serve King's County (later renamed County Offaly). The Tullamore & King's Co. Independent continued to be published until 1920 when it went on hiatus for a year due to Irish Republican Army activity before being published again as the Offaly Independent following the name change of King's County to County Offaly. In 1968 it merged with the Westmeath Independent and started to be published as the Offaly-Westmeath Independent until 1985 when it dropped the use of "Westmeath".

The Offaly Independent came into ownership of Celtic Media Group, which in turn was owned by the British Dunfermline Press, after being purchased for €20 million in 2004. In 2012, the Group was sold off for €5.5 million for Dunfermline Press to cover debts owed to Lloyds TSB. In 2017, there were plans to sell the newspaper to Independent News & Media. The deal was approved by the Competition and Consumer Protection Commission and was due to go for review by the Broadcasting Authority of Ireland but the deal fell through after Celtic Media Group cancelled the transaction. Until 2019, it was printed in County Meath.

The newspaper temporarily changed its name to the Obama Independent for its 20 June 2011, edition to commemorate U.S. President Barack Obama's visit to the local village of Moneygall. The issue was intended to be a special souvenir edition of the president's visit to County Offaly. It was the first time the newspaper had changed the name on its masthead in 119 years.
