= John Drennan =

Irish political journalist and writer

John Drennan (born Sean Armstrong) is an Irish political journalist and writer. He is a columnist for the Sunday Independent, an occasional TV panelist and a frequent contributor to radio shows. From County Laois he was educated at St. Patrick's College, Maynooth where he studied for an arts degree and worked as a part-time postman to fund his shooting and fishing hobbies. A gun enthusiast and writer of dole diaries, Drennan was openly affiliated with Fine Gael for many years and often referred to himself warmly as an "Old Blueshirt".

In 2015, Drennan announced that he was leaving his role with the Sunday Independent and had joined Renua — a new anti-abortion political party founded by Lucinda Creighton TD — to work as their Communications Director. After the party's underwhelming performance during the 2016 general elections, Drennan resigned and returned to his work as a journalist.

He has contributed to a number of publications, such as Magill and Village.

Drennan works as a Communications and PR consultant as Communicate Ireland along with journalist and former senator John Whelan.

== Publications ==
- Cute Hoors and Pious Protesters by John Drennan, Gill and Macmillan Ltd., 2011.
- Standing by the Republic: 50 Dail Debates That Shaped the Republic by John Drennan, Gill and Macmillan Ltd., 2012.
- Paddy Machiavelli How the Irish Prince Secures Power, by John Drennan, Gill Books, 2014.
- The Great Betrayal by John Drennan, Gill & Macmillan Ltd., 2015.
