= Donegal (town) =

Town in County Donegal, Ireland

Donegal Dún na nGall (Irish)
- Town
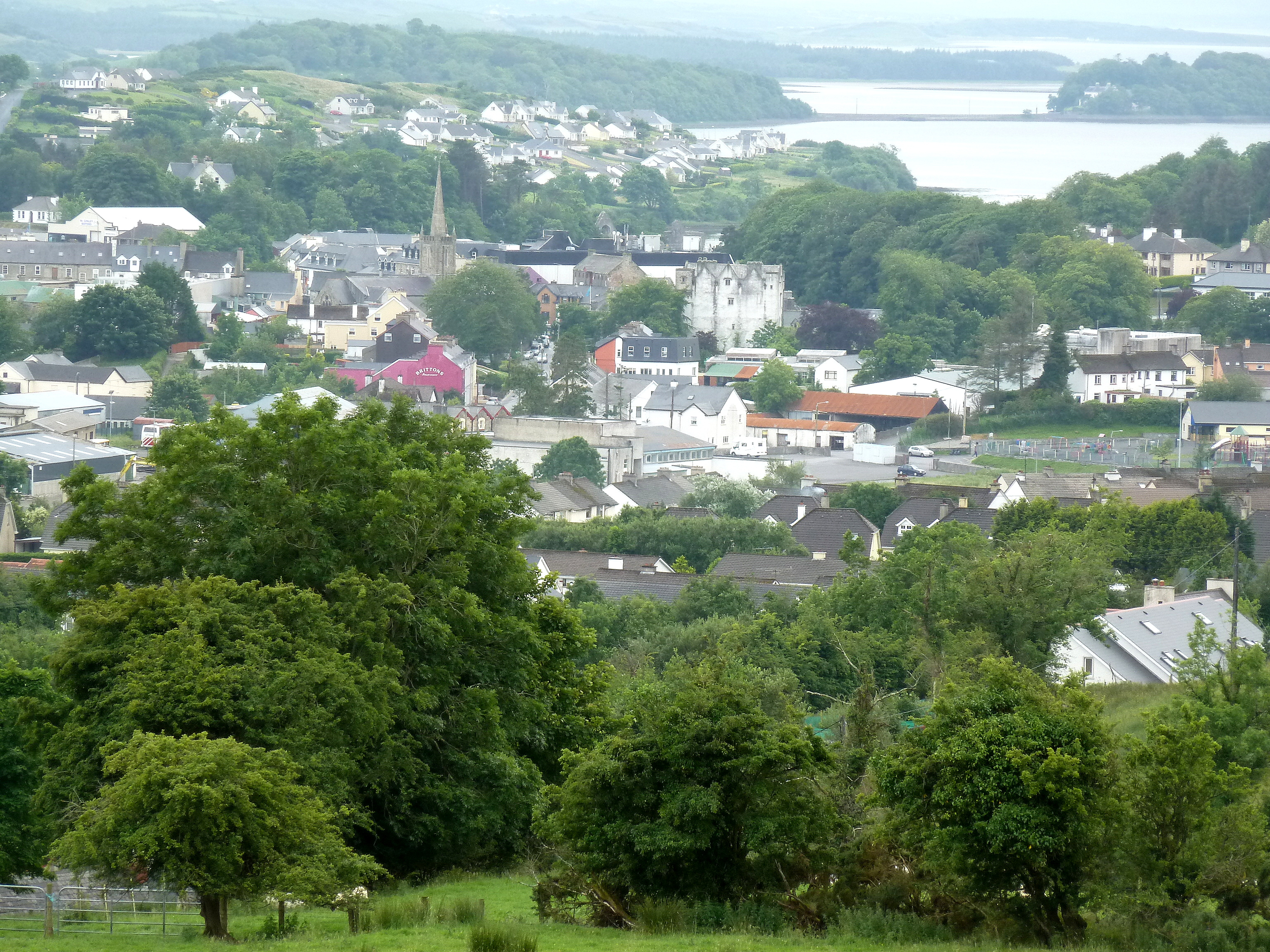
- Donegal Town, as seen from Drumroosk East

- Coat of arms

- Location in Ireland
- Coordinates: 54.654°N 8.110°W
- Country: Ireland
- County: County Donegal
- Province: Ulster
- Barony: Tirhugh
- Dáil Éireann: Donegal
- Region: Donegal

Area
  - Town: 2.8 km^{2} (1.1 sq mi)
- Elevation: 32 m (105 ft)

Population (2022)
  - Density: 967.4/km^{2} (2,506/sq mi)
  - Urban: 2,749
- Time zone: UTC±0 (WET)
  - Summer (DST): UTC+1 (IST)
- Eircode routing key: F94
- Telephone area code: +353(0)74
- Irish Grid Reference: G924789
- Website: www.donegaltown.ie

Donegal (/ˌdʌnɪˈɡɔːl, ˌdɒn-, ˈdɒnɪɡɔːl/ DUN-ig-AWL, DON-, DON-ig-awl; Irish: Dún na nGall [ˈd̪ˠuːnˠ n̪ˠə ˈŋal̪ˠ], "fort of the foreigners") is a town in County Donegal, Ireland. Although Donegal gave its name to the county, Lifford is now the county town. From the 15th until the early 17th century, Donegal was the "capital" of Tyrconnell, a Gaelic kingdom controlled by the O'Donnell dynasty of the Northern Uí Néill. The town is in a civil parish of the same name.

Donegal is in South Donegal, and is located at the mouth of the River Eske and Donegal Bay, which is overshadowed by the Blue Stack Mountains ("the Croaghs"). The Drumenny Burn, which flows along the eastern edge of Donegal Town, flows into the River Eske on the north-eastern edge of the town, between the Community Hospital and The Northern Garage. The Ballybofey Road (the R267) crosses the Drumenny Burn near where it flows into the River Eske. The town is bypassed by the N15 and N56 roads. The centre of the town, known as The Diamond, is a hub for music, poetic and cultural gatherings in the area. There is a memorial to the Four Masters in the centre of the Diamond.

== History ==
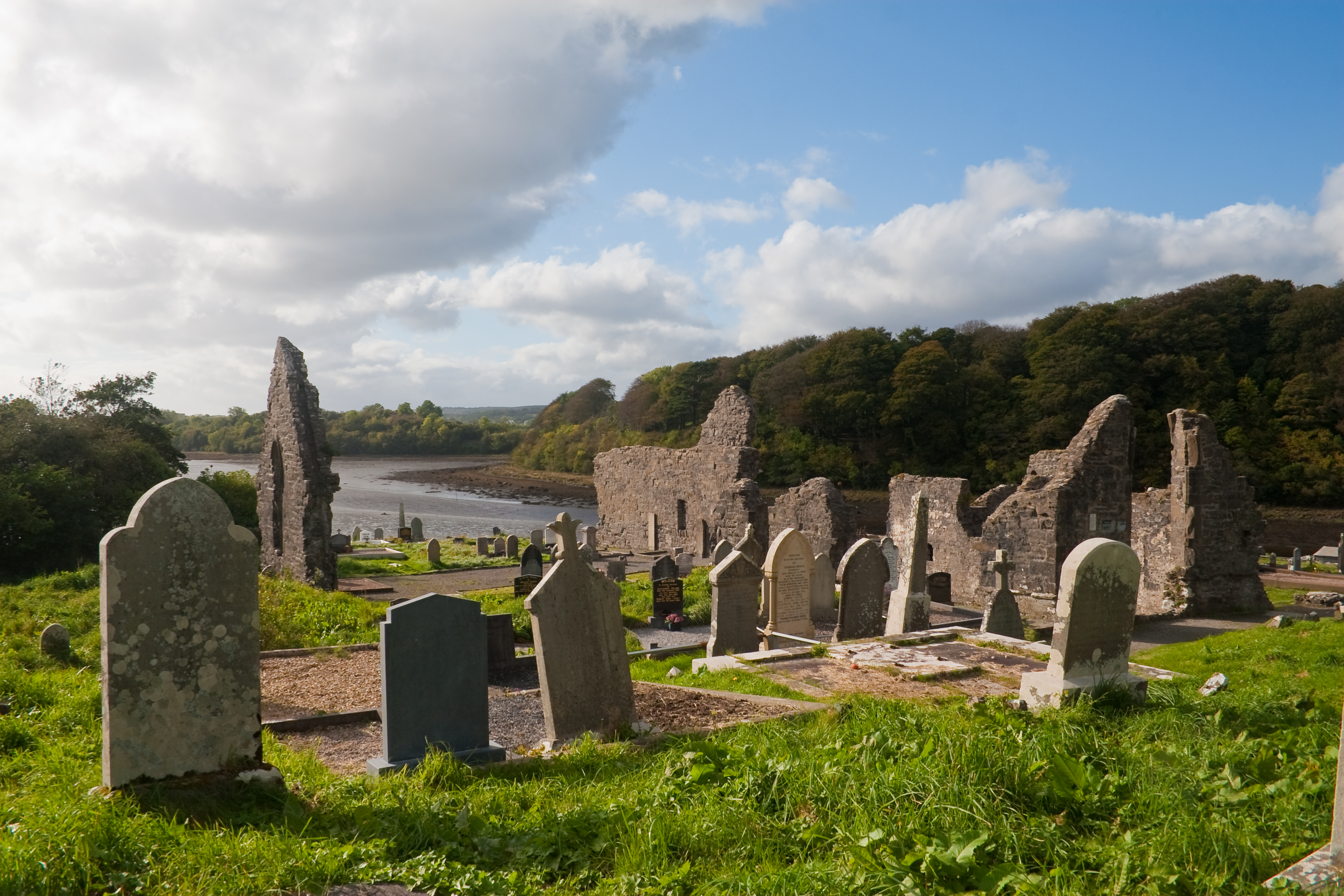
Donegal Abbey was founded by King Hugh Roe O'Donnell in 1474

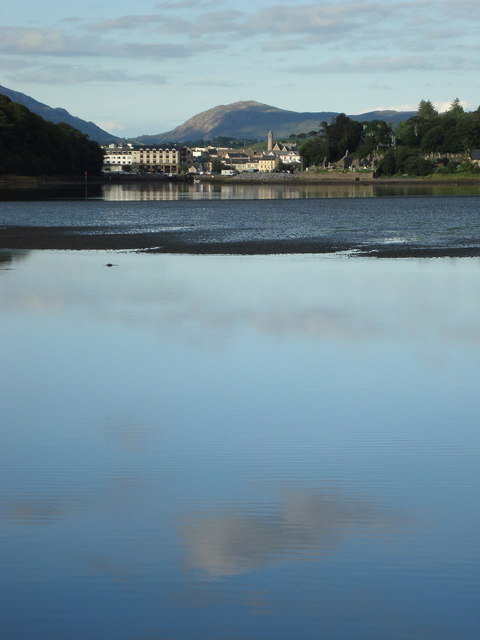
Approaching Donegal Town by sea

There is archaeological evidence for settlements around the town dating to prehistoric times, including the remains of ringforts and other defensive earthworks.

Donegal Town itself is famous for being the former centre of government of the O'Donnell dynasty, the great Gaelic royal family who ruled Tyrconnell in west Ulster for centuries and who played a pivotal role in Irish history. Their original homeland lay further to the north in the area of Kilmacrennan. From the 15th to the 17th century, they were an important part of the opposition to the colonisation of Ireland by England. The town itself contains Donegal Castle, on the banks of the River Eske, and the remains of Donegal Abbey, a Franciscan friary founded in the 15th century on the southern shore of Donegal Bay.

While Donegal Abbey represents the original Franciscan foundation associated with the O’Donnell lordship, it had ceased to function as an active centre by the early seventeenth century. Documentary and archival evidence preserved in Franciscan records indicates that the Convent of Donegal was subsequently re-established at Bundrowes (Bun Drobhaoise) in Bundoran, County Donegal, where it functioned as a house of refuge. Modern scholarship, drawing on Franciscan archival material including the Louvain Papers, identifies Bundrowes Friary in Bundoran as the principal base of Mícheál Ó Cléirigh during his years in Ireland and as the institutional setting in which the Annals of the Four Masters were compiled between 1632 and 1636, rather than at Donegal Town itself.

The story of Hugh Roe O'Donnell, Lord of Tyrconnell, was the inspiration behind many books and films, most notably Disney’s The Fighting Prince of Donegal.

In 1601 the Siege of Donegal took place during the Nine Years' War. After the Flight of the Earls from near Rathmullan in September 1607, the castle and its lands were seized by the English Crown and given to an Englishman, Captain Basil Brooke, as part of the Plantation of Ulster. Captain (later Sir) Basil Brooke (ancestor of the Viscounts Brookeborough) was granted the castle around 1611 and he proceeded to carry out major reconstruction work and added a wing to the castle in the Jacobean style. The current plan of the town was also laid out by Brooke, including an attractive town square known as The Diamond. From the late 17th until the early 20th centuries, Donegal Town formed part of the vast estates of the Gore family (from 1762 Earls of Arran in the Peerage of Ireland) and it was during their ownership that the town took on its present appearance. Donegal Borough returned two members to the Irish House of Commons, the lower house of the Parliament of Ireland, until the Acts of Union 1800 came into force in January 1801. Evidence of the Great Famine still exists, including a workhouse, whose buildings are now part of the local hospital, and many famine graves.

The population in 1841 was 1,366.

== Buildings of note ==
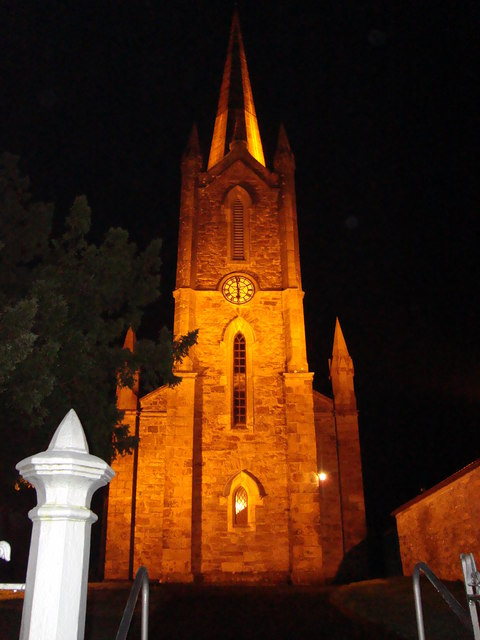
The Church of Ireland at night in Donegal Town.

=== Donegal Castle ===
Donegal Castle was the stronghold of the O'Donnells. It has been restored by the Office of Public Works.

=== St. Patrick's Church of the Four Masters ===
Dedicated to Saint Patrick and "the Four Masters", this Catholic church was built in the early 1930s and was completed in 1935. Known locally as "the Chapel" or "the Town Chapel", it was designed by Ralph Henry Byrne, the famous Dublin architect, in a mixed neo-Irish Romanesque and neo-Gothic style.

=== Donegal Parish Church ===
This Church of Ireland church was built in a simple Gothic style mainly in the late 1820s and was completed in 1828. The main church appears to have been designed by a Mr Graham of Donegal Town. A chancel was added in 1890. The chancel of 1890 was designed by the office of J. Guy Ferguson in Derry and built in a neo-Gothic style by James McClean builders from Strabane.

== Industry and tourism ==
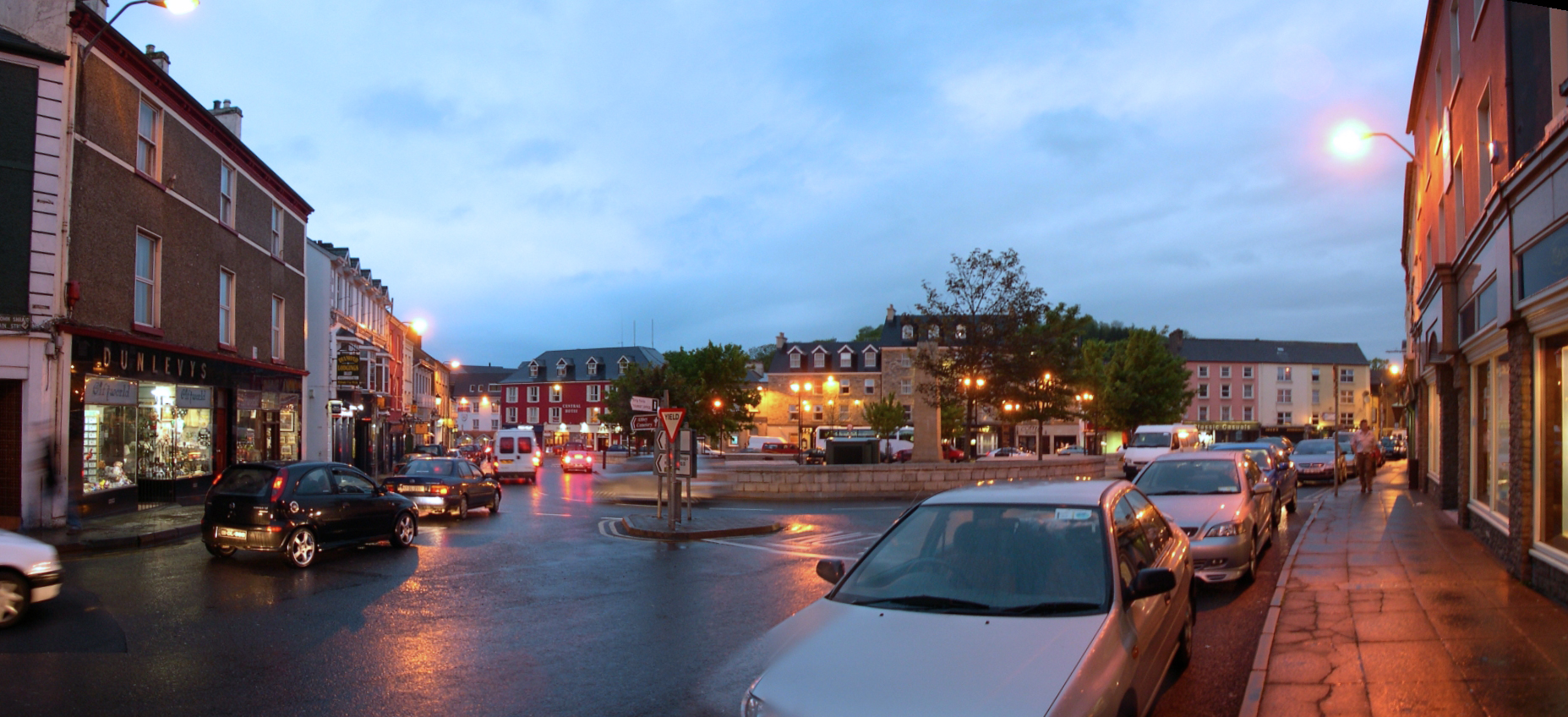
Donegal town centre at night

There are many sandy beaches in the area of Donegal, such as Murvagh beach, and some boasting good surfing conditions, such as Rossnowlagh. Donegal is also used as a base for hill-walking in the nearby Blue Stack Mountains. The town has many hotels catering for visitors, and nearby towns such as Letterkenny offer public swimming pools, cinemas and large shopping centres.

Like most clothing manufacturers in Ireland, the size of the workforce has been in decline for many years. Some of the clothing manufacturers have survived by focusing on one particular item of clothing. For example, tailor David Hanna, who started making suits for the locals in 1924, switched to making only hats in 1964 and is now shipping them all over the world. Donegal also has a long tradition of weaving carpets. Donegal Carpets have been made in Killybegs for over one hundred years and have been found in Áras an Uachtaráin, the University of Notre Dame and the White House.

On 1 December 2016, National Geographic Traveller named Donegal as the number 1 coolest destination of 2017. According to Pat Riddell, editor of the UK magazine, "It's a warm-hearted place, but wilderness always feels just a stone's throw away. And it is wilderness . . . world-class wilderness. We think it's due a big year."

== Transport ==
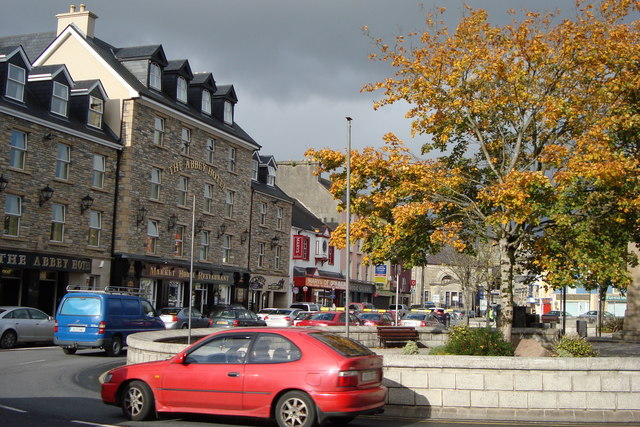
The Abbey Hotel in the Diamond

The Bus Éireann service number 64 Derry/Galway route; this makes several other stops including Letterkenny and Sligo (which allows for rail connections by Iarnród Éireann, from Sligo Mac Diarmada railway station in Sligo to Dublin Connolly railway station). This route also allows for rail connections from Waterside Railway Station in Derry to Belfast Grand Central, via Coleraine. The number 30 Donegal Town/Dublin route which makes stops at other key towns such as Enniskillen (which provides connections to Belfast via Ulsterbus). The number 490 Glencolmcille/Donegal route which makes stops in Carrick, Kilcar, Killybegs and Mountcharles. The number 492 Dungloe/Donegal route connects Dungloe to Donegal, with stops in Glenties, Ardara and Killybegs.

The other public bus service, TFI Local Link, provides numerous routes for Donegal, including Route 292 to Ballyshannon, Route 293 to Glencolmcille and Route 994 to Portnoo. Route 264 from Ballyshannon to Letterkenny also has a stop in Donegal.

Private bus operator, Feda O'Donnell Coaches (also known as Bus Feda), operates 2 Donegal/Galway routes: a regular from Crolly to Galway via Letterkenny and Donegal, and a Monday/Sunday service from Glenties to Galway that stops in Donegal. Bus Feda has also operates 2 services to Limerick via Letterkenny and Donegal, with stops in Sligo, Knock and Tuam. On Fridays during the college term it has a regular service to Limerick City, and on Sundays during term it also has stops at University of Limerick, TUS Limerick Moylish Campus and Mary Immaculate College.

Donegal railway station opened on 16 September 1889 and finally closed on 1 January 1960. The site of the old station is now used by CIÉ as a bus depot while the actual building is the home of the Donegal Railway Centre.

== Sport ==
Donegal town is home to many amateur sports clubs. The most popular sport in the area is Gaelic football, and the local GAA club is Four Masters. The club has also been developing hurling. Other popular sports include association football, rugby union, basketball and track and field.

Donegal Town was host to the final stage of the World Rally Championship on 1 February 2009.

== Media ==
The town is home to the regional newspapers Donegal Democrat and Donegal Post, and previously the local Donegal Times newspaper. The Northwest Express regional newspaper is also distributed throughout the town and surrounding county, as is The Derry Journal. Ocean FM, an independent local radio station from Collooney in County Sligo, has one of its three studios in the town, which broadcasts to most of south County Donegal. Highland Radio, which is based in Letterkenny, can also be received in the town. In the game Red Dead Redemption 2, the character Sean Macguire is from Donegal.

== Notable people ==
Historical

- Donnell Óg O'Donnell (c. 1242–1281), The O'Donnell, crowned King of Tyrconnell in Raphoe Cathedral in 1258
- Hugh Roe O'Donnell I (died 1505), The O'Donnell, King of Tyrconnell, builder of Donegal Castle
- Sir Hugh Doo O'Donnell (died 1537), The O'Donnell, King of Tyrconnell
- Manus O'Donnell (1490–1564), The O'Donnell, King of Tyrconnell, biographer of Saint Colmcille or Columba
- Sir Hugh O'Donnell (died 1601), The O'Donnell, King of Tyrconnell
- Hugh Roe O'Donnell (1572–1602), The O'Donnell, 24th Chieftain, Prince and Lord of Tyrconnell; born and raised in East Donegal
- Rory, 1st Earl of Tyrconnell (1575–1608), The O'Donnell, Prince and Lord of Tyrconnell
- Hugh Albert, 2nd Earl of Tyrconnell (1606–1642), Prince and Lord of Tyrconnell
- Lady Mary Stuart O'Donnell (1607–c. 1639), Irish noblewoman, renowned for her flight from England to Flanders, daughter of Rory, The O'Donnell, Prince and Lord of Tyrconnell

Modern

- Colonel Robertson, soldier and philanthropist
- John White (1833–1894), Conservative MP in the House of Commons of Canada
- Patrick O'Donnell (1856–1927) of Glenties, Bishop of Raphoe, Cardinal and Archbishop of Armagh
- Tom Conaghan, former Independent Councillor for Donegal and Gaelic football manager
- Mary Coughlan, former Fianna Fáil TD for Donegal South-West and Tánaiste
- Karl Lacey (born 1984), Gaelic footballer and 2012 All Stars Footballer of the Year

== Climate ==
Climate in this area has mild differences between highs and lows, and there is adequate rainfall year-round. The Köppen climate classification subtype for this climate is "Cfb" (Marine West Coast Climate/Oceanic climate).

Climate data for Donegal
Month	Jan	Feb	Mar	Apr	May	Jun	Jul	Aug	Sep	Oct	Nov	Dec	Year
Mean daily maximum °C (°F)	8 (46)	7 (45)	9 (48)	10 (50)	13 (55)	15 (59)	16 (61)	17 (62)	15 (59)	13 (55)	10 (50)	8 (47)	12 (53)
Mean daily minimum °C (°F)	3 (38)	3 (37)	4 (39)	5 (41)	7 (45)	9 (49)	11 (52)	11 (52)	10 (50)	8 (47)	5 (41)	4 (40)	7 (44)
Average precipitation mm (inches)	110 (4.5)	76 (3)	86 (3.4)	58 (2.3)	58 (2.3)	64 (2.5)	71 (2.8)	91 (3.6)	100 (4)	120 (4.7)	110 (4.5)	100 (4.1)	1,060 (41.6)
Average precipitation days	19	13	16	12	12	13	13	15	16	18	18	18	183
Source: Weatherbase

== See also ==
- List of towns and villages in the Republic of Ireland
- Abbey Vocational School
- List of monastic houses in Ireland#County Donegal
- Donegal, Pennsylvania
