= Drogheda Independent =

Irish newspaper

- Drogheda City's free newspaper
- Type: Newspaper
- Format: Newsprint and online
- Owner(s): Mediahuis Ireland, a subsidiary of Mediahuis
- Founded: 1884; 142 years ago
- Headquarters: Shop Street, Drogheda
- Website: drogheda-independent.ie

The Drogheda Independent is a newspaper that serves the Drogheda area, including Drogheda, Mid-Louth and East Meath.

The newspaper covers stories from local and regional news, advertisements and its own database of records. It is Drogheda's only non-free newspaper, the other main newspaper in Drogheda being the free Drogheda Leader.

The paper is owned by Mediahuis, through its subsidiary Independent News & Media.
