= The Anglo-Celt =

Weekly local Irish newspaper for Swellan, in Cavan

- Type: Weekly newspaper
- Format: Broadsheet 1846-2015; Tabloid 2015 - present
- Owner: Celtic Media Group
- Editor: Linda O'Reilly
- Deputy editor: Damian McCarney
- Founded: 1846
- Language: English
- Headquarters: Kilmore Business Park, Dublin Road, Cavan
- City: Cavan
- Country: Ireland
- Circulation: 11,692 (2013)
- Website: The Anglo-Celt

The Anglo-Celt (/ˈæŋɡloʊ ˈsɛlt/) is a weekly local newspaper published every Thursday in Swellan, Cavan, Ireland, founded in 1846. It exclusively contains local news about Cavan and Monaghan and surroundings. The news coverage of the paper is mainly based on the paper's local counties of Cavan and Monaghan. Traditionally focused on Cavan, The Anglo‑Celt has been the main local title to serve both counties, especially following the closure of The Northern Standard in late 2025. Over the years it has fended off competition from papers like the Cavan Post, The Northern Standard and The Cavan Voice. It is owned by Celtic Media Group.

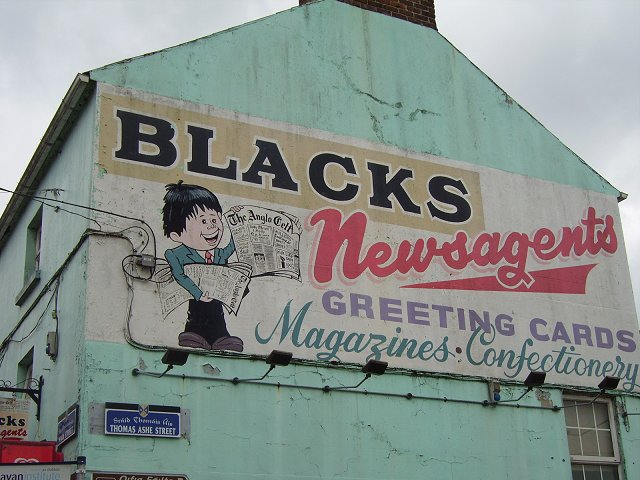
Billboard in Cavan town for Blacks Newsagents; the newsboy holds a copy of The Anglo-Celt.

According to the Audit Bureau of Circulations, it had an average weekly circulation of 18,000 during the first six months of 2007.

From 2000 to 2018, the newspaper had its offices in the former Cavan railway station.

Previously published in Broadsheet format, in 2015 the format changed to Tabloid.
