= An Gaedheal =

Bilingual Irish newspaper, published 1934–1937

An Gaedheal was a bilingual Irish newspaper published in Dublin from June 1934 to November 1937.

In its first twelve months, the paper appeared weekly, but from June 1935 until it came to an end it was published monthly.

With articles in both English and Irish, the paper was the successor of An Caman, also published in Dublin, which had ceased publication in June 1934.

The paper covered both national and international news and sought to oppose the Anglicization of Ireland by promoting the use of the Irish language. The first issue, dated 16 June 1934, priced at one penny, noted that its launch followed immediately the cessation of An Caman, "… so that the marching ranks of Gaeldom should not go without a clarion voice to champion their cause."

The new publication took over some of the features of An Caman, and also its writers, including "Bird of Boyle Roche".
