= The Waterford Chronicle =

The Waterford Chronicle (1804-1872) was a newspaper from Waterford, Ireland. The paper was founded in 1804, and was known then as Ramsy's Waterford Chronicle. In 1825, the Irish language scholar Philip Fitzgerald Barron bought the Waterford Chronicle, and used it to advocate for Catholic emancipation. The paper was passed to his brother Pierse Richard Barron, and then sold to a Mr Peter Strange before being owned by Edward Netterville Barron (another member of the Barron family). The paper struggled, going through various owners. It was published twice weekly for a while, revived by Patrick Flyin in 1850, and then became a weekly publication in 1865.

The paper ceased publication in 1872.
