= Polski Herald =

Polski Herald was a Polish language supplement published within the Wednesday edition of the popular Irish tabloid evening daily the Evening Herald in 2006 and 2007.

The supplement began as a result of the increasing number of Polish speaking immigrants arriving in Ireland after the EU accession of ten new members on 1 May 2004. The supplement seeks to support the increasing number of Polish nationals living in Ireland by providing local community information and news from home.
