= Tipperary Star =

Newspaper in Ireland

- Type: Weekly newspaper
- Format: Broadsheet until 2013 now Tabloid.
- Owner: Iconic Newspapers
- Editor: Anne O'Grady
- Founded: 1909
- Language: English
- Headquarters: Friar Street, Thurles
- City: Thurles
- Country: Ireland
- ISSN: 1393-9084
- OCLC number: 885427118
- Website: tipperarystar.ie

The Tipperary Star is a weekly regional newspaper covering news in County Tipperary, Ireland. The newspaper's main office is located in Thurles town. The paper is currently owned by Iconic Newspapers, who acquired Johnston Press's titles in Ireland in 2014.

The paper was first published on 4 September 1909.

The Tipperary Star is no longer ABC audited for circulation. For the first six months of 2008, average circulation was 9,072, according to the Audit Bureau of Circulation.

In March 2019, the Tipperary Star settled a lawsuit over an article about a TD.

== Editors ==
- Gerard O'Grady (1975–1987)
- Michael Dundon (1987–2011)
- Anne O'Grady (2011–2021)
- Noel Dundon (2021–present)
