= Longford Leader =

Weekly newspaper published in Longford, Ireland

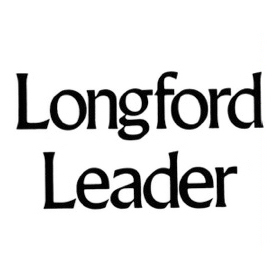
- Type: Weekly newspaper
- Format: Broadsheet
- Owner(s): Iconic Newspapers
- Editor: Alan Walsh
- Founded: 1897; 128 years ago
- Headquarters: Leader House, Longford
- Website: www.longfordleader.ie

The Longford Leader is a weekly newspaper, which has published in Longford, Ireland since 1897.

== History ==
The Longford Leader was founded, as The Longford Leader and Roscommon, Leitrim and Westmeath News, as a local newspaper with a Nationalist perspective, in 1897, by local activist and M.P., J. P. Farrell, and fellow M.P., Jasper Tully; it was one of a range of Nationalist projects on which they partnered. Farrell was the official proprietor and first editor. It was published on Saturdays, and priced at one penny.

As of 2002, the Leader was owned by four shareholders, local businessmen Eugene McGee (holding 47%) and Padraic Gearty, and Patricia Murray and Michael Dolan. In that year, it was fully acquired by Scottish Radio Holdings (SRH), for 9.1 million euro, after a competition between SRH and the parent company of the Cork Examiner; it made a profit of around 1 million euro for that year, up over 50% from the previous year, with a staff of 20. SRH's policy was not to interfere in operations, and it left the editor and managing director, Eugene McGee, in place.

Johnston Press acquired SRH's newspapers in 2005. The paper is currently owned by the Iconic Newspapers group, controlled by Malcolm Denmark, which acquired Johnston Press's titles in the Republic of Ireland in 2014, for 8.5 million euro after they cost more than 115 million euro to acquire. While data on individual newspapers' performance is not released, the holding company for the Irish regional titles remained profitable as of 2018.

As of 2020, the editor is Alan Walsh.

== Publication ==
The Longford Leader is published weekly on a Wednesday from its offices on the Dublin Road in the town of Longford, reporting on and circulated within County Longford and the surrounding counties. It has a news website, and Facebook and Twitter accounts. The newspaper also has an electronic form (an "e-paper"), and its archives can be accessed on a paid basis from its own site back to 2010, and further back via the Irish Newspaper Archives website.

The paper had a circulation of around 13,000 in 2002, from a county population of around 30,000. According to ABC, circulation declined to 7,167 for the period July 2012 to December 2012; this represented a fall of 7% year-on-year.
