= The College View =

Student newspaper of Dublin City University

- Type: Fortnightly
- Format: Compact
- School: Dublin City University
- Editor: Leonor Selas do Amaral
- Deputy editor: Ruby Dolan
- Founded: 1999
- Headquarters: Clubs and Socs Office; Dublin City University; Glasnevin; Dublin 9, Ireland
- Website: thecollegeview.ie

The College View is Dublin City University’s independent student newspaper, run voluntarily by students affiliated to DCU's Media Production Society. The newspaper was first published in 1999 after changing its name from The Bullsheet, its predecessor.

The College View has seven sections – News, Opinions and Features, Irish & Lang, Satire & Cartoons, Sports, Lifestyle and The HYPE (Arts). The sections cover everything from DCU student issues to national student issues, humour and satire to life through the eyes of students, as well as extensive sports coverage and analysis. The Irish & Lang section is written and edited by students interested in both Irish and Languages alike.

The newspaper is circulated among 12,000 students as well as DCU lecturers and staff.

== History ==
The College View was founded in 1999, and went under the name of The Bullsheet, a reference to the other DCU publication An Tarbh, for a while. The newspaper has changed layout several times during its history. It has always been tabloid-size. In January 2022 The College View affiliated with the DCU Media Production Society.

== Administration ==
The newspaper is run entirely voluntarily and is affiliated to the DCU Media Production Society. In addition to advertising revenue, The College View is funded by a grant from the Society Life Committee, however the newspaper remains fully independent.

== Supplements ==
The HYPE is the arts supplement of The College View. It was previously named the Suss until the 2017/18 academic year. It was previously named Flux where it won magazine of the year at the 2010 Oxygen.ie Student Media Awards. The arts supplement was previously named The Attic, having been renamed in 2009/10.

The Look was a fashion supplement produced in conjunction with the DCU Style Society in the past; however, is now published independently.

== The Bill O'Herlihy Cup ==
The Bill O'Herlihy Cup is an annual five-a-side football match held every year between The College View and DCUfm.

The game is a yearly tradition each April at Dublin City University between the rival student newspaper and radio station.

Founded in 2010, the game is named after broadcaster and journalist Bill O'Herlihy.

The Cork native covered numerous World Cups, European Championships and Olympic Games for RTÉ and is considered one of the greatest-ever Irish sports broadcasters. O'Herlihy died in May 2015.

The Bill O'Herlihy Cup was named in his honour. O'Herlihy presented the trophy on one occasion during a visit to Dublin City University and was interviewed by DCUfm about his career in media and broadcasting afterwards.

Winners:

2021: Postponed

2020: Postponed

2019: The College View

2018: DCUfm

2017: The College View

2016: The College View

2015: DCUfm

2014: DCUfm

2013: DCUfm

2012: The College View

2011: The College View

2010: DCUfm

== Awards ==
Oxygen.ie National Student Media Awards

- Journalist of the Year 2019 - Gabija Gataveckaite
- Features Writer News and Current Affairs 2019 - Ciara O'Loughlin
- RSA Award for Journalism on Road Safety 2019 - Cait Caden
- Editor of the Year 2018 - Shauna Bowers
- SFI Science Writer of the Year 2018 - Shauna Bowers
- Arts & Pop culture Feature Writer of the Year 2018 - Colin Gannon
- Journalist of the Year (National Press) 2018 - Aaron Gallagher
- Irish Journalist of the Year Iriseoireacht trí Ghaeilge (Scríofa) 2016 - Cal Ó Donnabháin
- Journalist of the Year (National Press) 2013 - Sarah Bermingham
- People's Choice Award 2012 - Under editor Catherine Dennehy.
- Irish Journalist of the Year 2013 Iriseoireacht trí Ghaeilge (Scríofa) - Derek O'Brien
- Irish Journalist of the Year 2012 Iriseoireacht trí Ghaeilge (Scríofa) - Frances Mulraney'
- Magazine of the Year 2010(Flux) - Samuel Hamilton
- News Features Writer of the Year 2010 - Stephen Mangan
- Arts Features Writer of the Year 2010 - Patrick Kavanagh
- Sports Writer of the Year 2010 - Stephen Mangan
- Journalist of the Year 2010 - Samuel Hamilton
- Sports Writer of the Year 2009 - Stephen Mangan
- Journalist of the Year 2009 - Michael McHale

DCU Hybrid Awards

- Website of the Year 2018 - thecollegeview.ie
- Layout and Design of the Year 2018 - Daniel Troy and Amanda Ward
- Website of the Year 2017 - thecollegeview.ie
- Publication Layout of the Year 2017 - Scout Mitchell and Hannah Kelly
- Arts/Features Journalist of the Year 2017 - Orla O'Driscoll
- News/Current Affairs Journalist of the Year 2017 - Aaron Gallagher
- News/Current Affairs Journalist of the Year 2016 - Hayley Halpin
- Arts/Features Journalist of the Year 2016 - Scout Mitchell
- Publication Layout of the Year 2014 - Marie Lecoq and Rachel McLaughlin (The College View)
- Sports Journalist of the Year 2014 - Ruaidhrí Croke
- Arts/Features Journalist of the Year 2014 - Aoife Bennett
- Website of The Year 2013 - Nicky Ryan (TheCollegeView.ie)
- News and Current Affairs Journalist of The Year 2013 - Sam Griffin
- Journalist of The Year 2013 - Sam Griffin
- Sports Journalist of The Year 2013 - Eoghan Cormican
- Sports Journalist of the Year 2012 - Brendan White
- Arts/Features winner - Valerie Loftus 2012
- Irish Language Journalist of the Year 2012 - Derek O'Brien
- News and Current Affairs Journalist of the Year 2012 - Sarah Doran
- Journalist of the Year 2012 - Aoife Mullen
- Journalist of the Year 2011 - Niall O'Connor
- Journalist of the Year 2010 - Stephen Mangan
- Features Writer of the Year 2010 - Sam Matthews
- Sports Writer of the Year 2010 - Michael Glennon

== Notable contributors ==
- Zainab Boladale - RTÉ Presenter

== Current editorial team (2025/2026) ==
The current editorial team for the academic year 2025/2026 is as follows:

Editor-In-Chief: Leonor Selas do Amaral

Deputy Editor-In-Chief: Ruby Dolan

News Team

- Editors: Pauline Bouillon, Shari Irfan & Felim Ryan

Sports Team

- Editors: Eva Timmons & Lucy Leonard

Production Team

- Sub-Editors: Amy Gough, Orla White, Aoibhe Dixon, Hannah Power & Alex Reilly

Arts Team

- Editor: Sadie Loughman

Features & Opinion Team

- Editors: Ailish Connor & Maria Yolanda Wolfer

Irish & Languages Team

- Editor: Zach Hodgkiss

Illustrations & Satire Team

- Editor: Sinead Armstrong

Lifestyle Team

- Editor: Aibhe Devilly

Science & Technology Team

- Editor: Brianna Murphy O'Dwyer

Sustainability & Environment Team

- Editor: Emma Whitney

== Editors ==
Vol	Year	Editor-in-Chief	Deputy Editor	News Editor(s)	Online Editor	Production Editor(s)
Vol XXVI	2024-2025	Katie O’Shaughnessy	Leonor Selas Amaral	Annu Mandal, Adam Van Eekeren, Zara Stafford		Kamil Kasza, Emily Grimes & Chloe Farrell
Vol XXV	2023-2024	Hannah Giron Daygo
Vol XXIV	2022-2023	Matthew Joyce	Muiris O'Cearbhaill	Louise Hickey, Jamil Bhaloo
Vol XXIII	2021-2022	Jamie McCarron	Devin Sean Martin	Jessica Woodlock, Muiris O'Cearbhaill, Kasey Leigh McCrudden, Matthew Joyce, Louise Hickey
Vol XXII	2020-2021	Aoibhín Meghen	Shauna Burdis	Niamh Quinlan
Vol XXI	2019-2020	Brendan Fernando Kelly Palenque	Aine O'Boyle	Aoife O'Brien & Tadgh McNally		Sally Dobie
Vol XX	2018-2019	Callum Lavery	Gabija Gataveckaite	Cáit Caden & Ellen Fitzpatrick	Emily Sheahan	Rachel Helpin & James Nolan
Vol XIX	2017-18	Shauna Bowers	Kyle Ewald	Kyle Ewald & Fionnuala Walsh		Daniel Troy
Vol XVIII	2016-17	Aaron Gallagher	Aidan Geraghty	Hayley Halpin & Rebecca Lumley		Scout Mitchell
Vol XVII	2015-16	Catherine Devine	Katie O'Neill	Katie O'Neill	Kevin Kelly	Scout Mitchell
Vol XVI	2014-15	Michael Cogley	Finnian Curran	Finnian Curran & Sharron Lynskey	David Mathews	Gianluca Avagnina
VoL XV	2013-14	Aoife Mullen	N/A	Sarah Bermingham & Ciara Moore	Mary McDonnell	Marie Lecoq
Vol XIV	2012-13	Brendan White / Jenny Darmody	Jenny Darmody / Sam Griffin	Aoife Mullen	Nicky Ryan
Vol XIII	2011-12	Ceile Varley / Catherine Dennehy	Rachel Grassick / Conor Donohoe	Sorcha Jowitt & Aisling Phelan
Vol XII	2010-11	Steve Conlon / Niall Farrell	Niall Farrell	Ceile Varley
Vol XI	2009-10	Audrey Donohue / David Kearns	Samuel Hamilton	Niall O'Connor / Samuel Hamilton
Vol X	2008-09	Stephen Dunne / Michael McHale		Michael McHale / Audrey Donohue
Vol IX	2007-08	Eoin O'Neill	-	Stephen Dunne
Vol VIII	2006-07	Aisling O'Rourke	-	Lyndsay McGregor / Sarahlee Madigan
Vol VII	2005-06	Cathal McMahon	-	Maeve Ni Ghealbhain
Vol VI	2004-05	TBC	TBC	TBC
Vol V	2003-04	TBC	TBC	TBC
Vol IV	2002-03	Adrienne Sweeney	-	Sean Carroll
Vol III	2001-02	Paul O'Flynn	-	Mary Regan
Vol II	2000-01	Michael Brennan	Paul O'Flynn	Jody Sheridan
Vol I	1999-00	Laura Slattery	Jimmy Healy	Patrick Horan / Ciaran Cronin
