= The Irish Family =

Irish weekly Roman Catholic newspaper from 1992 to 2008

- Type: conservative, religion-orientated
- Format: weekly
- Owner: Thomas Keaveney
- Publisher: Nation Communications and Media Ltd
- Editor: Lorcan Mac Mathúna
- Ceased publication: September 2008
- Headquarters: Dublin

The Irish Family (later The Irish Family Press) was an Irish weekly Roman Catholic newspaper from 1992 to 2008, providing news and commentary about the Roman Catholic Church and social issues. It was traditional Catholic in outlook, supporting the Tridentine Mass and critical of the European Union.

It was founded as The Democrat in 1992 after the X Case. Shortly thereafter it changed its title to The Irish Democrat, which was later changed to The Irish Family to avoid confusion with the paper of the same name run by the Connolly Association. In its first years it was run by Dick Hogan, a Mullingar-based local newspaper proprietor and Catholic activist. It published a regular column on Marian devotion by the theologian Fr Michael O'Carroll. It was strongly hostile to European integration and supported attempts to establish an independent Catholic political party. Other contributors included Donna-Marie Cooper O'Boyle and Ann-Marie Madden.

Editor until early 2006 was Gerry McGeough, an IRA activist who until 2003 was on the Sinn Féin executive, and who had spent a number of years in prison for various arms offences. He left to set up a new nationalist newspaper, The Hibernian. He was jailed in February 2011 for the shooting of an off-duty UDR soldier in 1981 and membership of the IRA. He was followed as editor by Lorcan Mac Mathuna, who had previously been associated with the anti-abortion movement Youth Defence.

The newspaper was not doing well financially. The company's accounts show it made a loss of €58,272 in the year ended 30 September 2005. It announced in August 2008 that it was ceasing printing and would go online. However, an online version does not seem to have appeared.
