= Galway Advertiser =

Free weekly newspaper in Galway, Ireland

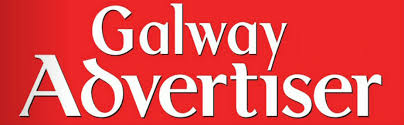

- Type: Weekly newspaper
- Format: Tabloid
- Owner(s): Galway Advertiser Ltd
- Founder(s): Ronnie O'Gorman
- Editor: Declan Varley
- Founded: 1970
- Language: English
- Headquarters: 41-42 Eyre Square, Galway
- City: Galway
- Country: Ireland
- Website: advertiser.ie

The Galway Advertiser is a free newspaper distributed throughout Galway city and county each Thursday.

== History ==
The Galway Advertiser was founded in 1970 by Ronnie O'Gorman, with the first edition published on 16 April 1970. O'Gorman edited the paper until his retirement in 2001, following which, he served as chairperson of Galway Advertiser Ltd.

In the 1980s, the paper published editions written entirely by Galway's student population.

In 2001, the newspaper purchased its new headquarters, the former Norwich Union building at Eyre Square in Galway for IR£1.5 million.

It was the first of the regional newspapers under the "Advertiser" banner, which now also includes publications based in Athlone and County Mayo, as well as advertiser.ie.
