= Meath Echo =

- Type: Newspaper
- Format: Tabloid
- Owner(s): Irish Village Papers
- Founded: 2004
- Ceased publication: 2011
- Headquarters: County Meath
- Circulation: 65,000 (as of 2011)
- Website: www.meathecho.com

The Meath Echo is a newspaper that was created in 2004 when three local papers in County Meath joined forces: The Ratoath News, The Local Echo, and The Ashbourne And District Eagle.

Speaking to Sunday Business Post, the editor of Irish Village Papers Joe Doyle said:

The merging of the three titles will enable us to produce our very popular newspapers more often. Like larger national newspapers, The Meath Echo will only concentrate on local issues and local sports.

== Content ==
- Local News for Ashbourne, Ratoath, Navan, Kells, Trim, Slane, Dunboyne and more
- Sports News for Meath
- Things to do in County Meath
- Advertisement for local shops
- Recruitment for County Meath
- Property Section
- What's new in Motors
- Weekly polls on Current Topics

The Meath Echo Entertainment Section contained:

- Free Event Listing for County Meath
- Cinema movie reviews
- Latest DVD reviews
- Retro review competition - review of an all-time classic film e.g. Buffalo 66, The Big Lebowski - Submitted by readers
- Competitions
