= Metro Éireann =

Irish newspaper

- Type: Fortnightly newspaper
- Format: Tabloid
- Editor: Chinedu Onyejelem
- Founded: April 2000
- Ceased publication: 2020
- Political alignment: Multicultural
- Headquarters: Dublin, Ireland
- Website: www.metroeireann.com

Metro Éireann was an Irish multicultural tabloid newspaper. It was established in April 2000 by editor Chinedu Onyejelem and his colleague Abel Ugba, Nigerian-born journalists who had emigrated to Ireland. Based in Dublin, Metro Éireann focussed on issues affecting Ireland's immigrants.

== Founders ==
Editor Chinedu Onyejelem had previously worked on The Irish Times and The Irish Catholic before co-founding the paper. He is one of Ireland's most visible immigrants (now an Irish citizen) and was a recipient of a People of the Year Award in 2006 in recognition for his work on multiculturalism. Onyejelem is a member of the Irish Department of Foreign Affairs-NGO Standing Committee on Human Rights and is a fellow of the Transatlantic Forum on Migration and Integration. Co-founder Abel Ugba is now an academic at the University of East London.

== Publications ==
Metro Éireann frequently broke news stories of national significance. In 2007, it published an article which revealed the Garda Síochána's decision to disallow its officers from wearing religious headwear. This particular story led to a national debate in the mainstream media on issues pertaining to cultural integration, religious rights, assimilation, and Irishness. Other news stories have also led to intensified public debate through the years.

The newspaper was published fortnightly and featured columns from Ireland-based contributors from around the world, including Nigeria, Somalia, Pakistan, Israel, South Africa, Poland and the United States. It carried a dedicated Irish language section and strongly promoted minority sports such as women's rugby and martial arts. The Booker Prize–winning writer Roddy Doyle and American political commentator Charles Laffiteau were among its regular contributors. But because newspapers are dependent on printers being able to print, distributors being able to deliver copies around the country and shops being open for people to buy or pick up copies of its newspapers, the Irish government's March 2020 national lockdown in response to the COVID-19 pandemic wiped out every part of this chain and forced Metro Éireann to cease publishing in April 2020. It also published an Annual Magazine over a number of years, eg, Ireland in 2005, Ireland in 2006.

== Events ==
Metro Éireann ran the annual MAMA (Media and Multicultural Awards) event and also devised complementing awards which involved various sections of Irish society: the business community through the Ethnic Entrepreneur of the Year Awards, launched by President Mary McAleese in 2007; the creative arts through the Metro Éireann Writing Awards (judged by Roddy Doyle); the musical community through the Dublin International Gospel Music Festival; and the Nigerian Diaspora via the Global Achievers Awards for Nigeria, which also honoured Irish people who have made positive contributions to Nigeria or the Nigerian communities (e.g. missionaries).
