= Sligo Weekender =

Local newspaper in Ireland

- Type: Weekly newspaper
- Format: Tabloid
- Owner: Dorothy Crean
- Publisher: Sligo Weekender Ltd
- Founded: 1983
- Headquarters: Sligo, County Sligo, Ireland
- Website: sligoweekender.ie

The Sligo Weekender is a weekly local newspaper published every Thursday in Sligo, County Sligo, in Ireland. It contains news of interest to Sligo town and county along with the surrounding counties of Leitrim, Roscommon and North Mayo.

== History ==
The newspaper was founded in 1983 by Brian McHugh, initially as an advertising-funded 'freesheet' with some local news. In 1996, McHugh sold the publication to Thomas Crosbie Holdings (TCH), publisher of the Irish Examiner and other titles; he remained as editor. It became a paid-for newspaper in 2002.

In December 2010, TCH sold the tabloid newspaper to Carrick-on-Shannon native Kevin Mitchell, who operated a printing company in Wexford. Mitchell subsequently sold the newspaper and, as of 2022, it was owned by Dorothy Crean.

== Competition and circulation ==
As of 2007, the newspaper's competition included the Sligo Champion and Sligo Post. According to circulation figures collated by the Audit Bureau of Circulations for late 2007, the Sligo Weekender then had a weekly circulation of approximately 7,900 copies.

== Recognition ==
In 2004, the Sligo Weekender won a "community activity" award (for newspapers with circulations under 50,000) at the International Newspaper Marketing Awards. It also previously received an "award of excellence" at the European Newspaper Design Awards.
