= Leitrim Observer =

Weekly Irish newspaper

- Type: Weekly newspaper
- Format: Tabloid
- Owner: Iconic Newspapers
- Editor: Colm McSherry
- Founded: 1889
- Headquarters: Carrick-on-Shannon, County Leitrim
- Website: www.leitrimobserver.ie

The Leitrim Observer is the oldest newspaper in County Leitrim, Ireland. It is a weekly newspaper published every Wednesday and once competed with another newspaper called the Leitrim Post which closed in 2009.

== History ==
The Leitrim Observer was founded by the Mulvey family in 1889. It was bought by Pat Dunne, for a rumoured sum of £150, some time before 1910. When the Black and Tans came to Carrick-on-Shannon during the War of Independence, they badly burned the newspaper's premises, destroying many of its early files.

Historically, each paper was folded by hand, until the early 1950s when the first folding machine was introduced. By the latter part of the 20th century, the paper moved from hot metal printing to the use of linotype machines. The owners of the Observer later invested in an electronic photo-engraving machine, only the second of its kind in Ireland, which cost £5,000.

Pat Dunne died in 1968 and his nephew, Greg, took over the running of the company, re-organising the paper and spending £10,000 on updated machinery. In later years, another Pat Dunne, son of Greg, took over as managing director.

In September 1998, Scottish Radio Holdings purchased the Leitrim Observer for £1 million. UK-based group Johnston Press later purchased the Leitrim Observer in June 2005. Since 2014, the paper has been owned by Iconic Newspapers, which acquired Johnston Press's titles in Ireland in 2014.

== Circulation ==
According to ABC, circulation declined to 6,273 for the period July 2012 to December 2012, this represented a fall of 9% on a year-on-year basis.
