= Westmeath Independent =

Local weekly newspaper serving County Westmeath, Ireland

The Westmeath Independent is a local newspaper, founded in 1846, serving County Westmeath, Ireland. It is based in the town of Athlone. Publication is weekly on Wednesdays. It is owned by Celtic Media Group.

Circulation as of 2012 was 7726.
