= The Mayo News =

Newspaper published in Westport, Ireland

- Type: Weekly newspaper
- Format: Tabloid
- Owner: Dermot Berry
- Editor: Michael Duffy
- Founded: 1892
- Political alignment: Centrism
- Language: English
- Headquarters: Westport, County Mayo
- Website: mayonews.ie

The Mayo News is a weekly local newspaper published in Westport in Ireland.

== History and profile ==
The Mayo News was established in Westport in 1892 by William and Patrick J Doris. In 1968 the paper's format changed from broadsheet to tabloid to sell better. After writing several editorials on the Corrib gas controversy during her tenure, editor Denise Horan took up a position as Shell Ireland's senior communications advisor at the end of April 2009.

According to the Audit Bureau of Circulations, the paper had an average weekly circulation of 10,315 during 2005.

In 2007 and in 2014 the Mayo News was named the European Newspaper of the Year in the category of local newspapers.

In 2016 the Mayo News won awards for the Best Designed Newspaper and the Sports Story of the Year and was shortlisted in the categories of News Story of The Year, Best use of Photography and Best Feature Story of the Year at the Local Ireland Media Awards.

The newspaper is printed (but not owned) by Celtic Media Group.

In September 2022 it was reported that the paper would be acquired by Iconic Newspapers, which owns over 15 local weekly titles.
