= Colonel Robertson's Fund =

Colonel Robertson (c. 1737–c. 1791) was the son of a clergyman based in County Donegal, Ireland. In his will, dated 1790, he left a sum of money to the Diocese of Raphoe for use by schools. This fund aided the transition between the outdoor hedge school and the indoor-based education provided by the national school system. A number of schools in County Donegal were supported by the fund.

== History ==
=== Bequest ===
Colonel Robertson's will, dated 25 December 1790, bequeathed a sum of money, out of the interest of which, £15 per annum was to be paid to each of the parishes in the diocese of Raphoe. During the 19th century, these funds were used for the support of a school-master and to instruct children of all religious denominations. The fund increased and enabled the trustees to grant £40 to each parish, for the erection of a school-house.

According to the Thirteenth Report of the Commissioners for enquiring into the State of all Schools on Public or Charitable Foundations in Ireland (March 1812):

"There is in the Diocese of Raphoe a very munificent Endowment for the education of the Children of the lower orders of the people, established under the last Will and Testament of the late Colonel Robertson, who in the year 1790, by his last Will and Testament dated 25 September in that year, did among other Bequests therein mentioned make the following:-

"I give and devise to the Parishes of the Diocese of Raphoe a sum of money, which by its interest at the rate of five per cent shall be found sufficient to produce fifteen pounds sterling annually to each Parish, for or towards establishing a School therein, and purchasing books, as well of entertainment as of instruction, in every Parish of said Diocese; and it is to be understood, that such as in said Parishes may not be of the Established Religion, are notwithstanding to share equally in this Legacy, which it is to be hoped will contribute to their conformation with the English church, by enlightening their understandings; and I do appoint the Lord Primate of Ireland, the lord Archbishop of Dublin, the Lord Bishop, Dean, Archdeacon and Rectors of said Diocese for the time being, to be Trustees herein for said Parishes, with a power to form such regulations in the founding and conducting of said Schools aforesaid as may seem best to them; and to dispose of, in the purchase of Lands of Inheritance in fee simple, or to put to interest on good security in Ireland, the aforesaid sum of money."

=== Decree of 1803 ===
In the 'Thirteenth Report of the Commissioners for enquiring into the State of all Schools on Public or Charitable Foundations in Ireland', 18 March 1812 it was recorded that:

On Monday the 7th day of March, 1803, the Right honourable the Lord Chancellor of Ireland, Lord Redesdale, was pleased to pronounce the following Decree respecting said Charitable Bequest.

DECREE: It is ordered, adjudged and decreed by the Right honourable the Lord Chancellor of Ireland, that the Bequests in the Testator's Will to the Parishes of the Diocese of Raphoe, of a sum of money, which by its Interest, at the rate of five pounds per cent, shall be found sufficient to produce 15 pounds sterling annually to each Parish, ought to be considered as a Bequest of 300 pounds sterling for the benefit of each Parish; and it appearing that there are 31 Parishes in said Diocese, it is further ordered that the said Bequest ought to be Deemed and is hereby decreed as a Bequest of the sum of nine thousand three hundred pounds sterling, payable within one year after the death of the Testator."

=== Later developments ===
The Robertson schools were generally not seen as improving local education; in 1856, 26 of the schools were visited by the schools inspector and only 4 were scored as being satisfactory.

In 1858, the Commissioners of Education inspected the schools and found that the fund had become a hindrance to the development of education. It was observed that:

"when the entire support of the master is thrown on the endowment by the rector of the parish, the bequest of Colonel Robertson becomes an evil rather than a benefit, as, by superseding all other support, it introduces a starveling, useless school. With some exceptions, the diocese of Raphoe would have been provided with parochial schools of a better class if the endowment had never been made".

Robertson's fund supported approximately 100 schools in Donegal during the 19th century.

Today, there are a number of schools that carry the name Robertson in Donegal. For example, Robertson National School, Stranorlar and Robertson National School, Lifford.
