= Patrick Cahill (Irish Nationalist) =

Newspaper editor and activist (died 1886)

- Born: Castletown, County Laois
- Died: 1885/86; Castletown
- Occupations: newspaper editor and activist
- Notable work: founder and editor of the Leinster Leader newspaper

Patrick Cahill LLB (died 1885/6) was the founder and editor of the Leinster Leader newspaper, a political activist who supported Irish Nationalist causes such as the Land League and Home Rule.

== Life ==
He was born in Castletown, County Laois and was educated at St. Patrick's, Carlow College, where his uncle was the distinguished orator and natural philosopher Dr. Daniel William Cahill. At Carlow he studied for and obtained an LLB from the University of London.

He founded the Leinster Leader on 14 August 1880 in Naas, County Kildare, serving as its first editor. He served as the Honorary Secretary of the Queen's Co. Independent Club, and was credited with its success. The Club later became a branch of the Land League.

He was arrested as part of his political activities the Coercion Act of 1881 for publishing seditious material. He was imprisoned, once in Kilkenny Gaol, later he was jailed in Clonmel under the Protection of Person and Property Act 1881. Imprisonment compromised his heath and he died at his home in Castletown in 1885 or 1886.

His brother was the Rev. Thomas Cahill, S.J., became president of the Jesuit College in Melbourne, Australia. He also had a sister, who lived in his house after his death.

A large monument was erected over Cahill's grave in Arles Churchyard, funded by public subscription with the inscription:

Sacred to the memory of Patrick Cahill L.L.B "This monument has been erected by a people truly grateful for the earnestness with which he devoted his splendid abilities in the cause of his religion and his country."
