= Meath Chronicle =

Irish Newspaper

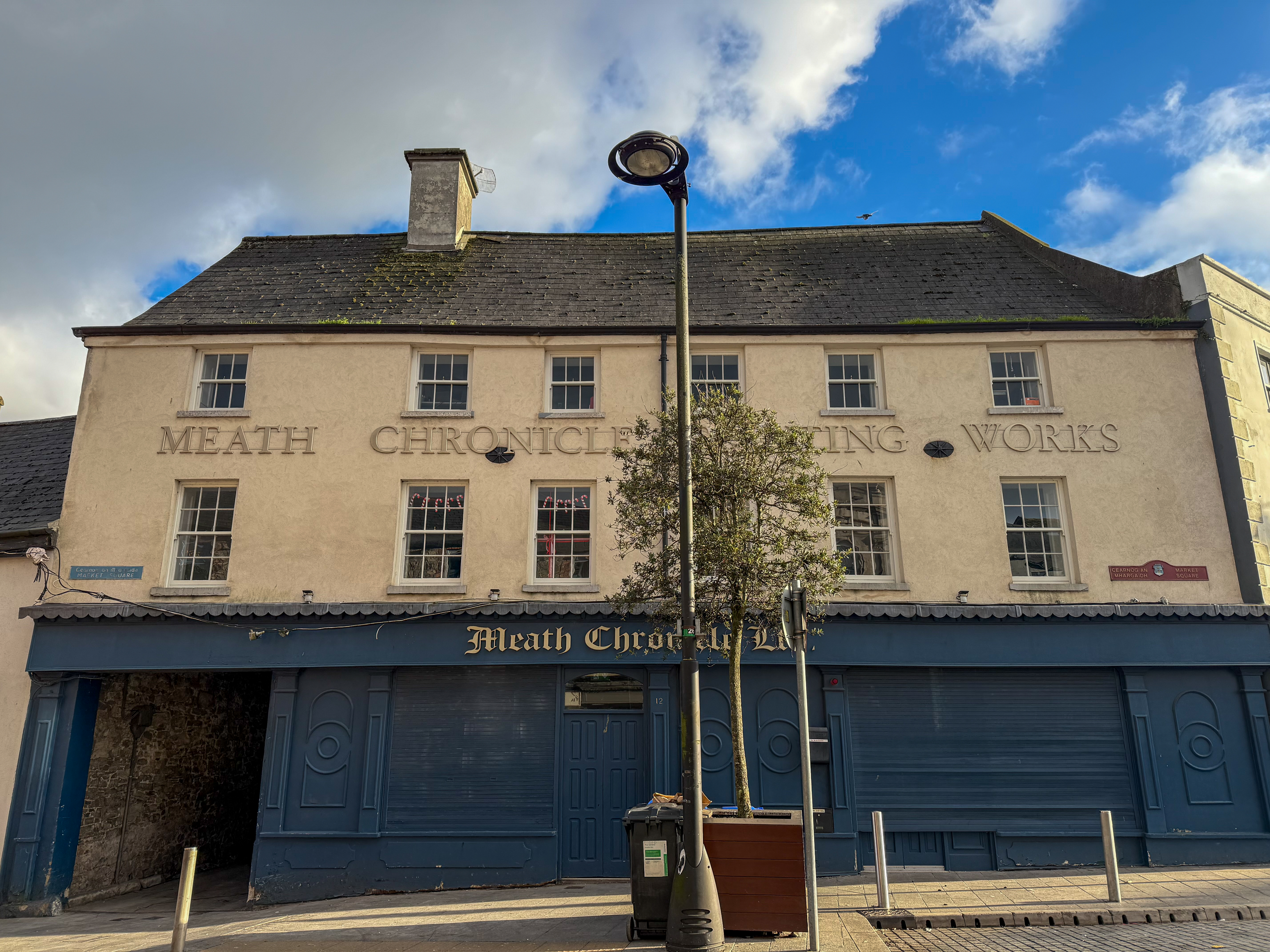
Meath Chronicle office in Navan

The Meath Chronicle is a local newspaper serving County Meath (as well as County Cavan), Ireland and based in the town of Navan. It is published weekly and owned by Celtic Media Group.

Circulation as of 2008 was 14,651. According to ABC, circulation declined to 10,373 for the period July 2012 to December 2012, this represented a fall of 5% on a year-on-year basis.

The newspaper changed from broadsheet to tabloid format in 2015.
