= The Connaught Telegraph =

Newspaper in Castlebar, Ireland

- Type: Weekly newspaper
- Format: Compact
- Owner: Celtic Media Group
- Editor: Tom Kelly
- Founded: 1828
- Political alignment: Central
- Headquarters: Castlebar
- Website: Connaught Telegraph website

The Connaught Telegraph is a weekly local newspaper published in Castlebar, County Mayo in Ireland. The paper is in compact format (six columns), and published every Tuesday.

== History ==
Frederick Cavendish (1777–1856) founded The Connaught Telegraph or Mayo Telegraph as it was originally named, on 17 March 1828, and used it as an organ to help fight the battles of the lower classes. He swiftly established a reputation as a man of authority and strong opinions, and demonstrated how powerful the press could be in the long and arduous struggle to achieve Home Rule for Ireland. As editor, Cavendish earned a reputation as a man to be respected. When setting up the newspaper, he incorporated it into the titles of other local publications. As a result, many historians believe The Telegraph goes back as far as 1828. They base their assertion on the fact the name or title of a newspaper does not and could not take from the age of the original newspaper.

In July 2014, after being bought out by Celtic Media Group, The Connaught Telegraph changed from its broadsheet format to a smaller compact format in line with other local and national titles.
