= Derry News =

Northern Irish newspaper

The Derry News is a newspaper based and published in Derry, Northern Ireland.

== History ==
It was first published in February 2001. The newspaper changed hands in the summer of 2006, when a consortium including River Media and the Irish News acquired the title from the McCarroll family.

The newspaper was revamped and printed in full colour resulting in a significant upturn in sales. The Derry News is edited by John Gill.

The Derry News won Weekly Newspaper of the Year at the Northern Ireland Media Awards in 2010 and also won the Weekly Newspaper of the Year award at the 2011 UK Society of Editors Regional Press Awards. The Derry News also won Front Page of the Year at both the 2016 Northern Ireland Media Awards and the 2016 UK Society of Editors Regional Press Awards for its coverage of a tragedy which resulted in five members of the one family drowning when their vehicle was submerged in a lough.

Former Editor Ciaran O'Neill won NI Weekly Newspaper Journalist of the Year in June 2014.

In November 2018, it was announced that River Media had sold the title to Iconic Newspapers.
