= New Ross Standard =

Irish local newspaper

- Type: Local newspaper
- Format: Tabloid
- Owner(s): Mediahuis Ireland, a subsidiary of Mediahuis
- Founded: c. 1889
- Language: English
- Headquarters: County Wexford, Ireland
- Price: € 2
- Website: www.newrossstandard.ie

The New Ross Standard is a local weekly newspaper published every Tuesday in County Wexford, Ireland. It is published in colour.

The newspaper was first published c. 1889. In later years, it has been made available as an online newspaper.

It contains stories relating primarily to New Ross town and its surrounding area, as well as stories relating to County Wexford and to a lesser extent County Kilkenny. It was, as of 2021, the "best selling regional newspaper in the New Ross area".

It is owned by the Mediahuis Ireland, a subsidiary of Mediahuis.
