= Dundalk Democrat =

Newspaper in Dundalk, Ireland

- Type: Weekly newspaper
- Owner: Iconic Newspapers
- Editor: Michelle O'Keeffe
- Staff writers: Donard McCabe, Jason Newman
- Founded: 1849
- Language: English
- City: Dundalk
- Country: Ireland
- Website: dundalkdemocrat.ie

The Dundalk Democrat, originally the Dundalk Democrat and People's Journal, is a regional newspaper printed in Dundalk, Ireland.

Established by Joseph Cartan, with its first issue published on 20 October 1849, it "endorsed nationalism and tenant right" from the start, and then later the Tenant League, and Independent Party candidates running for County Louth.

The paper primarily serves County Louth as well as County Monaghan and parts of County Armagh, County Down, County Cavan and County Meath. It comes out every Tuesday with three editions: The Town Edition, The County Edition and The Monaghan Democrat. The paper is owned by Iconic Newspapers, which acquired Johnston Press's titles in the Republic of Ireland in 2014. The Dundalk Democrat is one of two non-free newspapers in Dundalk, the other being The Argus.

The original offices of the Dundalk Democrat still stand at No. 3 Earl Street in the centre of Dundalk. It now operates from 16b Williamsons Mall, a short distance from its original location.
