= The Nationalist (Tipperary) =

Irish newspaper

- Type: Weekly newspaper
- Format: Broadsheet until 2013 now Tabloid
- Owner: Iconic Newspapers
- Language: English
- Headquarters: Queen Street, Clonmel
- City: Clonmel
- Country: Ireland
- Circulation: 13,171 (as of 2011)
- Website: nationalist.ie

The Nationalist is a newspaper based in Clonmel in County Tipperary, Ireland, which was established in 1890.

It is a broadsheet newspaper that appears weekly, covering news, events, and sport in both Clonmel town and south Tipperary. It had a circulation of over 14,000 in 2010. It was formed to represent the views of the Irish nationalist community in County Tipperary, which led to the first editor being jailed under a Coercion Act on charges that he had intimidated a cattle dealer for taking a farm from which tenants had been evicted. It supported the Anglo-Irish Treaty, which led to the paper being shut down by Séumas Robinson during the Irish Civil War.

The paper is owned by Iconic Newspapers, which acquired Johnston Press's titles in Ireland in 2014.

As of early 2011, The Nationalist reportedly had a circulation of approximately 13,000 copies.
