= Leinster Express =

Irish newspaper

- Type: Weekly
- Format: Tabloid
- Owner(s): Iconic Newspapers
- Founded: 1831
- Headquarters: Portlaoise, County Laois; Ireland
- Circulation: Unknown, no longer ABC audited
- Sister newspapers: Offaly Express
- Website: www.leinsterexpress.ie

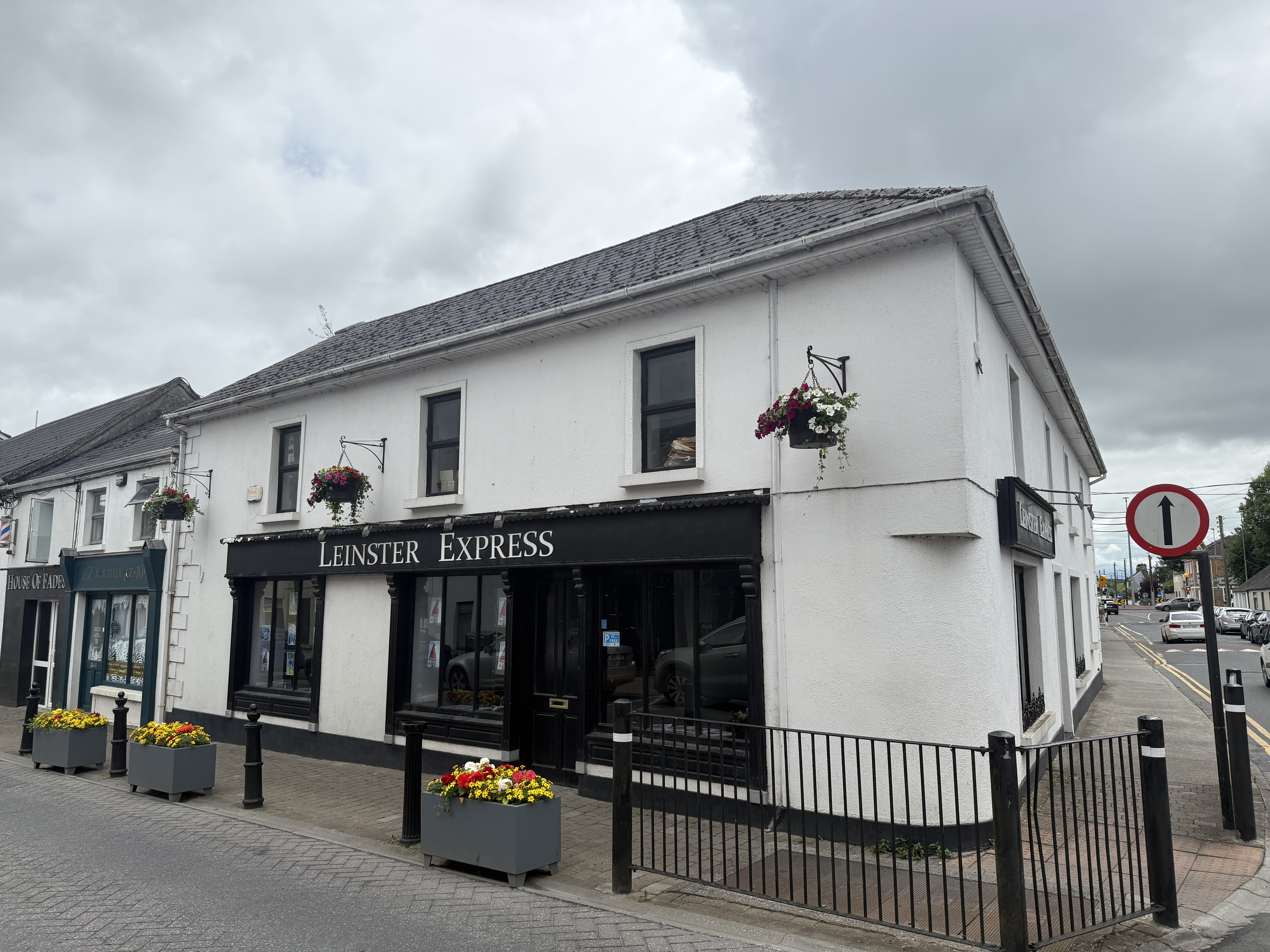
Headquarters at Portlaoise

The Leinster Express is a regional newspaper in Ireland that serves County Laois.

The paper was part of the Leinster Leader Group, which was sold to Johnston Press in late 2005. The paper is currently owned by Iconic Newspapers, who acquired Johnston Press' titles in Ireland in 2014. The offices of the Leinster Express are based in Portlaoise.

The Leinster Express was originally published in Maryborough (renamed Portlaoise in 1929), Queen's County (renamed County Laois in 1922), Ireland in 1831 - an archive of its papers are available in Laois County Library in Portlaoise.
