= Offaly Express =

The Offaly Express is an online newspaper and former print newspaper in Ireland that serves County Offaly. The paper is part of the Iconic Newspapers Group. The offices of the Offaly Express are based in Portlaoise. The paper was founded in 1984.

Justin Kelly is editor of the Offaly Express.

In June 2012, it was announced that Johnston Press Ireland were to close the Offaly Express' print newspaper version with the loss of 8 jobs. The final edition was published on 5 July 2012 after 29 years.

The paper was published on a weekly basis every Wednesday and accepted submissions via e-mail including articles and pictures relevant to the county.

Although the paper has closed down, the website is still operational and is one of the strongest regional or local digital titles in Ireland.

In 2014, Iconic Newspapers acquired Johnson Press's titles in Ireland.
