= The Munster Express =

Newspaper in the Republic of Ireland

- Format: Tabloid
- Owner: Doreen Connolly MD
- Editor: Paul Mooney
- Founded: 1860
- Language: English
- Headquarters: 49 Patrick Street, Waterford
- City: Waterford
- Country: Ireland
- Website: www.munster-express.ie

The Munster Express newspaper was established in 1860 in the South Eastern Irish city of Waterford.

The newspaper covers stories from Waterford city and County Waterford plus south Kilkenny, co Tipperary and co Wexford. It retails at €3.20. The Munster Express's office is located on Patrick Street in Waterford City.

The paper has four sections - News, Sport, Townlands and Entertainment.

The Munster Express has been edited by Paul Mooney since May 2024.

The newspaper covers Waterford City and County; South Kilkenny; Carrick-on-Suir and Clonmel, County Tipperary; and New Ross, County Wexford.
