= Letterkenny Post =

Irish newspaper

- Type: Weekly freesheet
- Format: Tabloid
- Owner: Iconic Newspapers
- Editor: Rory Mooney
- Founded: 1 September 2005
- Headquarters: Letterkenny, County Donegal
- Website: www.letterkennypost.com

The Letterkenny Post (formerly the Letterkenny Leader) is a freesheet newspaper published by Iconic Newspapers in Letterkenny, County Donegal. It was the first paper from River Media. The newspaper specialises in property, motoring, entertainment, farming and fashion. Its offices are located at the Dry Arch Business Park, Bonagee. The paper also publishes a free digital copy of the paper through its website.

== History ==
It was published weekly from 1 September 2005 with close to €700,000 being invested in its weekly publication. This publication has stopped publishing.

== Ownership ==
The newspaper was owned by River Media. In November 2018, it was acquired by Iconic Newspapers.
