= River Media =

- Company type: Privately held
- Industry: Media
- Founded: 2005
- Headquarters: Letterkenny, Ulster, Ireland
- Key people: Padraig O'Dwyer, Tim Collins,
- Products: Newspapers and radio

River Media is an Irish media group that was founded in 2005. It operated local newspapers and local news websites in County Donegal, County Londonderry and County Kildare.

River Media was based in Letterkenny, County Donegal, but it also had offices in Derry City, Dungiven, Buncrana, Donegal Town and Kildare.

In November 2018, it was announced that River Media had sold their 7 weekly newspapers to Iconic Newspapers.

The company now operates as an active company with a registered office in Belfast and is part of a consortium forming Northern Media Group that operates Q Radio stations in Northern Ireland.

== Titles ==
=== Former newspaper titles ===
- Letterkenny Post (Sold to Iconic Newspapers)
- Finn Valley Post (Sold to Iconic Newspapers)
- Inish Times (Sold to Iconic Newspapers)
- Donegal Post (Sold to Iconic Newspapers)
- Derry News (Sold to Iconic Newspapers)
- County Derry Post (Sold to Iconic Newspapers)
- Kildare Post (Sold to Iconic Newspapers)

=== Former online publications ===
- Derry Now (Sold to Iconic Newspapers)
- Donegal Now (Sold to Iconic Newspapers)
