= Celtic Media Group =

Irish newspaper publishing company

- Country of origin: Ireland
- Headquarters location: Navan, County Meath
- Publication types: Newspapers
- Official website: www.celticmediagroup.ie

Celtic Media Group provides publishing, printing and pre-press (graphic design) services to the Irish newspaper sector. It also has a digital consultancy service.

== History ==
Previously owned by the Scottish media firm, Dunfermline Press Group, the Celtic Media Group is owned by its Irish management team, following a management buy-out which was completed in 2012.

Celtic Media expanded following the acquisition of the Connaught Telegraph in 2014 and its co-ownership of Dublin People Group, publisher of Northside People & Southside People, acquired in 2018.

The group's publishing titles – among them Meath Chronicle; Anglo Celt; Westmeath Examiner – were the subject of an acquisition bid by Independent News & Media (INM) in late 2016 which was approved by the Competition & Consumer Protection Commission and the Department of Communications. However, both parties opted not to proceed with the acquisition due to the level of undertakings around employment levels required by the regulatory process.

The print company, operated by Celtic in Navan, was restructured in October 2019 with the loss of 16 jobs and the cessation of its long-standing Trinity Mirror contract. Two print contracts were subsequently secured – the Northern Standard newspaper and the Racing Post Weekender title – with the Navan plant operating on a lower cost base.

The group won three of the 12 overall awards and received 11 nominations in the 2020 Local Ireland Media Awards.

In July 2020, the Southside People and Northside People titles were restructured under a new owner. Celtic continued to provide pre-press and print services to the Dublin People titles.

Frank Mulrennan, CEO of Celtic and representing the Local Ireland industry body, told the Oireachtas Committee on Media (December 2020) that the country's 46 weekly local newspapers publish "vital, trusted, and needed public information" but are facing major challenges. He said: "In reality, our industry is still badly impacted by the last recession and the digital dominance of the likes of Facebook and Google."

In 2021, the print plant announced the renewal of its contract to print the Racing Post daily newspaper and three weekly titles for five years.

== Current newspaper titles ==
- The Connaught Telegraph
- The Anglo-Celt
- Meath Chronicle
- Westmeath Examiner
- Westmeath Independent

== Former assets ==
- Forum. (Meath, free newspaper, publication 'suspended' in 2017).
- Offaly Independent(Suspended in March 2020)
- Southside People (49.9% stake) (liquidator appointed in May 2020)
- Northside People (49.9% stake) (liquidator appointed in May 2020)

== See also ==
- List of Irish newspapers
