= Donegal Post =

- Type: Weekly newspaper
- Format: Compact
- Owner(s): Iconic Newspapers
- Founded: June 2006
- Headquarters: Donegal Town
- Website: https://www.donegallive.ie/

The Donegal Post is a local weekly regional newspaper published in County Donegal, Ireland. When the paper was first launched by River Media in June 2006, it served the area of south County Donegal, west County Fermanagh, north County Leitrim and north County Sligo.

It was soon joined by sister papers in Sligo, Leitrim, Cavan, Monaghan and Wicklow which have all since closed down. The Rivermedia directors have cited the effects of the current economic recession as the main problem leading to the closures.

The Donegal Post is based in Pier 1, Quay Street, Donegal Town, and covers several other major towns in County Donegal, including Ballyshannon, Bundoran, Donegal Town, Glenties, Ardara and Killybegs. The paper's popularity grew as a result of its snappy news style and pictorial content. In a county with heavy competition, it has been able to carve out its own niche and now has a regular weekly readership.

In November 2018, it was announced that River Media had sold the title to Iconic Newspapers.

== See also ==
- Pauric McShea, who has a weekly column, "McShea's Say"
