= Gemma O'Doherty =

Irish journalist and political candidate

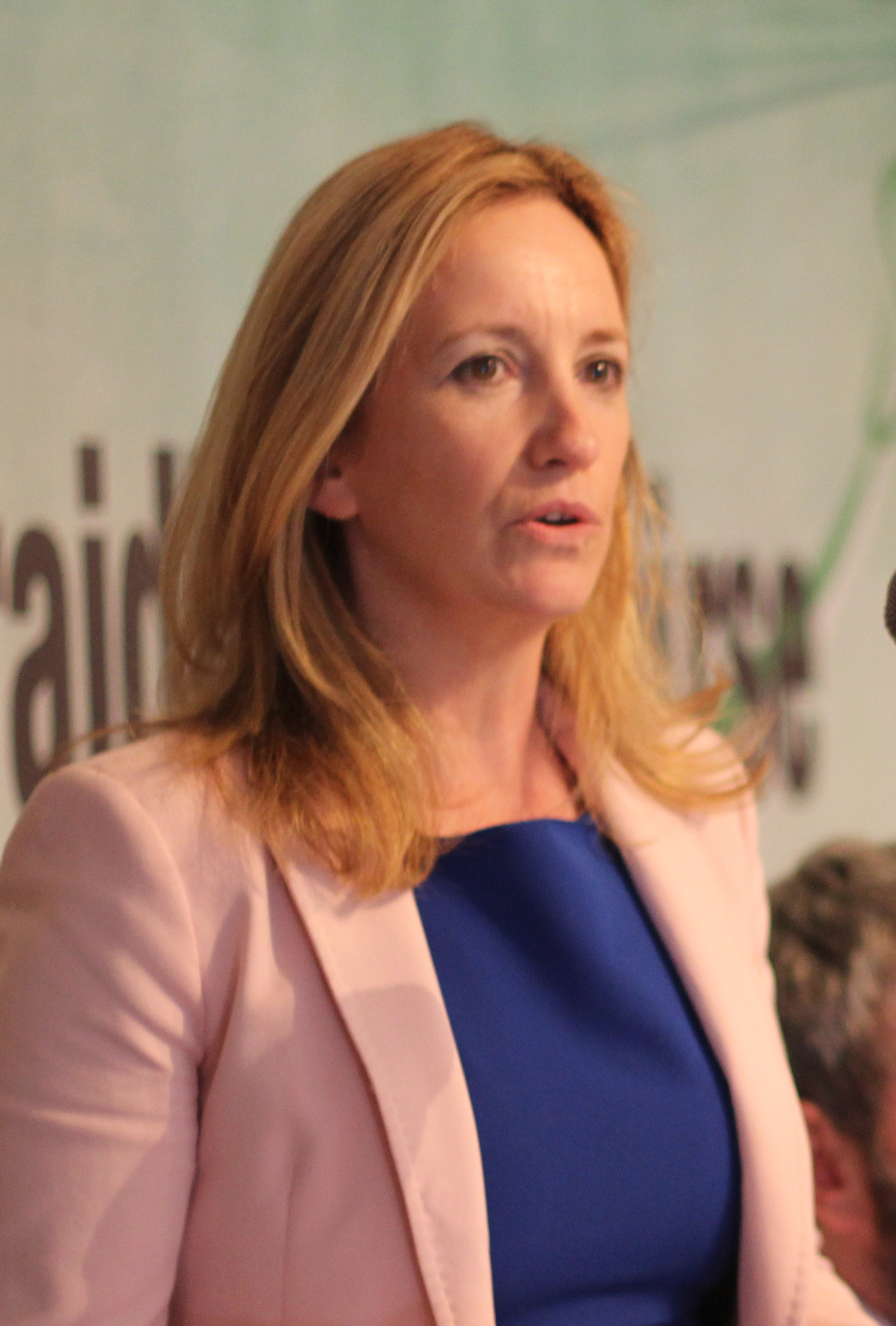
- Speaking at Sinn Féin Summer School, June 2014
- Born: 24 August 1968 (age 58); Ranelagh, Dublin, Ireland
- Education: Muckross Park College
- Alma mater: University College Dublin
- Occupation: Journalist
- Years active: 1995–present
- Known for: Journalist for the Irish Independent, seeking presidential nomination, far-right activism, promotion of conspiracy theories
- Spouse(s): Peter Carvosso (died 2015)
- Website: gemmaodoherty.com

Gemma O'Doherty (born 24 August 1968) is an Irish far-right activist and conspiracy theorist. She began her career as a staff writer for the Irish Independent, contributing articles on travel, the criminal justice system and corruption, but was dismissed in 2013. She attempted to run as a candidate in the 2018 Irish presidential election, but failed to secure the minimum qualifying number of nominations required to be added to the ballot. O'Doherty was unsuccessful in the 2019 European Parliament election in Ireland, receiving 1.85% of first preference votes in the Dublin constituency. She unsuccessfully ran in the 2020 Irish general election receiving just under 2% of first preference votes.

Her views on a range of subjects have led to a series of legal actions and calls for tightening of hate-crime legislation. She has been banned from YouTube since July 2019 for violations of its policies on hate speech.

== Early life ==
Gemma O'Doherty was born in Ranelagh in Dublin, to Hubert O'Doherty, a pharmacist, and his wife Sheila. O'Doherty has a BA in Politics and an MA in Equality Studies from University College Dublin. She was a teacher before becoming a journalist, and lived in Spain for a number of years. At age 18, she spent a summer in a kibbutz in Israel. She is the widow of the editor of the Irish Independent's Sunday Review, Peter Carvosso. Born in England in 1947, he died of motor neurone disease in January 2015, aged 67; O'Doherty was his second wife.

== Journalism ==
O'Doherty joined the Irish Independent in 1995 as a staff writer, later becoming Chief Features Writer. However, her highest-profile work concerned her reporting on Ireland's criminal justice system and on police corruption in the Garda Síochána. In 2013, Roy Greenslade in The Guardian, at the time she was fired from the Irish Independent, described her as "one of Ireland's leading investigative journalists", but mentioned concerns over the ethics of her newsgathering methods. In 2018, another Irish journalist, Michael Clifford, questioned the impact of her investigative work and her use of "theories of conspiracy".

In 2010, O'Doherty wrote an article highlighting issues in the investigation into the 1985 death of priest Niall Molloy, after a society wedding in County Offaly that included senior Irish political figures, and the collapse of the subsequent manslaughter trial. Her work led to the reopening of the case. According to O'Doherty, her research had "exposed a cover-up of staggering proportions involving several institutions of the State and the Catholic Church". In 2015, a Garda review of the case concluded that the original Garda investigation was correctly concluded.

In April 2013, while investigating the penalty points cancellation scandal, O'Doherty sought to question Martin Callinan, Garda Commissioner, about the quashing of his own speeding points and called to his private home at approximately 10 pm in order to do so, speaking to Callinan's wife. In August 2013, Doherty was fired from the Irish Independent and, though the newspaper rejected any links between the events, editor-in-chief Stephen Rae branded her as a "rogue reporter" for approaching the commissioner without editorial permission. (Note: UK-based papers reported that Stephen Rae had also had his penalty points annulled by the Irish Garda, and that Rae had been a former editor of the Garda Review Magazine.) The Irish National Union of Journalists condemned the dismissal as unfair.

O'Doherty lodged a complaint about her dismissal with the Employment Appeals Tribunal (EAT), which was resolved in 2014 with Independent News & Media plc tendering an apology and paying her an undisclosed sum. Similarly, she won a defamation case against the Irish Independent at the High Court. As part of the apology, Independent Newspapers stated that it wished to "acknowledge the exceptional work of multi-award winning investigative journalist Gemma O'Doherty for the Irish Independent during the course of a lengthy career".

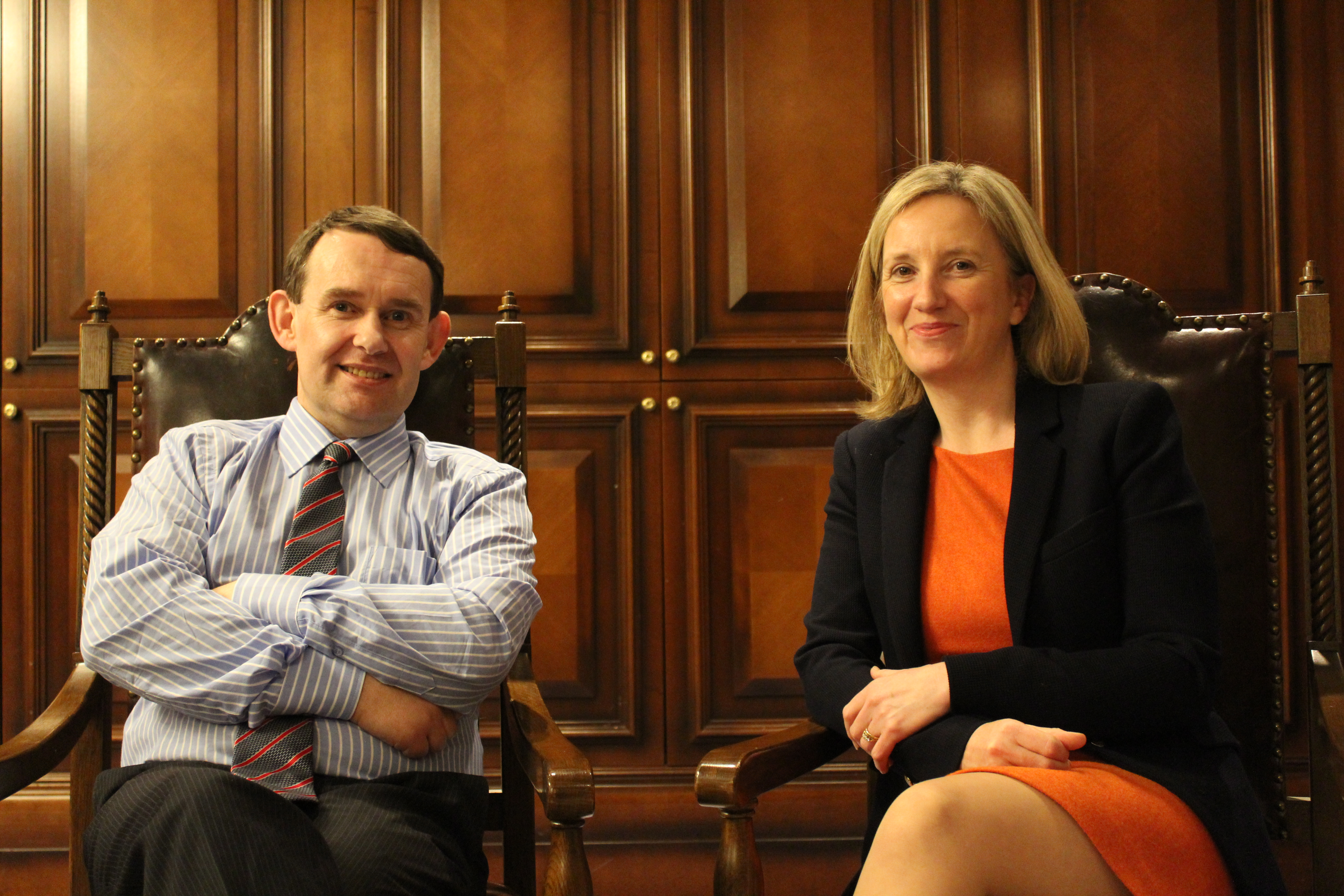
Justin Barrett being interviewed by Gemma O'Doherty in 2019.

After the Irish Independent, O'Doherty worked freelance, publicly criticising "the cosy cartel that exists between the press, power and the police in this country". In 2016, she produced a documentary, Mary Boyle: The Untold Story, about the disappearance of a child in 1977, which was published on YouTube. The disappearance of Mary Boyle is the longest running missing child case in Ireland, and the documentary implies political interference in the investigation. It led to O'Doherty being sued for defamation by Fianna Fáil politician Sean McEniff for damages of €75,000. In 2019, after McEniff's death, a judge granted his estate leave to continue the case.

In late 2017, O'Doherty wrote an article, published by Village magazine, concerning allegations of long-term child sexual abuse in Terenure College, Dublin, and followed it up in early 2018 with allegations that the Gardaí did not act on information they had about issues regarding the college's rugby coach, John McClean. A year later, McClean was formally charged with indecently assaulting nine students in Terenure College over a 17-year period.

In August 2019, Village published an editorial on O'Doherty and her relationship with the magazine. It described her as "the It girl for Irish extremism: racism, anti-Islamism, homophobia and transphobia". It defended her previous freelance work for the magazine, saying "O'Doherty's politics were not offensive until some time after Village published its last piece by her" and concluded by stating that "Once O'Doherty revealed herself as racist she was no longer welcome in these pages".

In August 2021, O'Doherty and John Waters launched a freesheet newspaper titled The Irish Light, largely consisting of anti-vaccine propaganda and other conspiracy theories. It is run in conjunction with The Light, a UK publication, and reprints much of the UK version's articles.

In December 2022, Edel Campbell, the mother of Diego Gilsenan, a minor who had died by suicide, called for the removal of her son's image, and that of 41 other people, from the cover of The Irish Light. Their images had been used without permission in videos posted online by O'Doherty, and in a cover story of the freesheet, which linked their deaths to the Covid vaccine. The images used included those of people who had died from suicide and Katie Moran, a camogie player who had died following an incident during a match.

== Politics ==
O'Doherty announced on 19 August 2018 she was seeking a nomination to stand for the Irish presidency in the 2018 election on an anti-corruption platform. However, her campaign fell into controversy when during a nomination hearing she stated that there was state collusion in the murder of journalist Veronica Guerin, and threatened councillors, including the brother of Veronica Guerin, with libel after her claims were strongly disputed. O'Doherty's claims drew labels of a conspiracy theorist from the Irish media, including Veronica's brother, councillor Jimmy Guerin. On 24 September, Laois County Council became the only council to nominate her as a presidential candidate. Having failed to reach the required four county council nominations by 26 September, she could not stand for election. O'Doherty attributed her failure to secure the political nominations to being "blocked by the political elite from contesting."

In February 2019, O'Doherty founded Anti-Corruption Ireland (ACI), described as a "political movement", which promotes "'truth, justice and integrity in public office', where public servants who abuse citizens' rights and their taxes will lose their jobs, pensions and their liberty". However, O'Doherty's strong § Opinions across a range of subjects (e.g. Muslim immigration, HPV vaccine, LGBT rights, and George Soros), including "false flag" claims regarding the March 2019 Christchurch mosque shootings, became an issue for ACI. In March and April 2019, the Imperial and Maritime hotels in Cork, a pub in Sligo and a parish hall in Schull cancelled public meetings that had been booked by ACI. In April 2019, the Ballyvolane House hotel in Cork cancelled another ACI booking, citing O'Doherty's views as the reason. As of 2019, ACI was not registered as a political party, but was registered as a "third party" with the Standards in Public Office Commission.

On 10 April 2019, O'Doherty announced that she intended standing in May's European Parliament election, in the Dublin constituency. O'Doherty registered as an independent candidate, and not an ACI candidate, as ACI is not a registered political party, with newspapers reporting her saying that she was going to offer Anti-Corruption Ireland to the Irish people, and saying that "if they don't want it I can say that I tried but they didn't want it, they wanted to continue to pursue the death of their country". However, O'Doherty continued to use ACI branding on some of her European election campaign posters and literature. During the campaign in May 2019, adverts for O'Doherty and ACI appeared on the sides of Dublin Bus, the public service transport operator, carrying the slogan "It is time to take Ireland back". The adverts were criticised by LGBT activists and the National Bus and Rail Union (NBRU). Dublin Bus's parent company, Córas Iompair Éireann, subsequently announced it and its subsidiary companies would no longer allow political advertising. O'Doherty received 1.8% of first-preference votes in the European Parliament elections, finishing 12th out of 19 candidates in the first count. She was eliminated on the 9th count.

She was later a candidate in the 2019 Dublin Fingal by-election held on 29 November 2019. She received 1,026 (4.1%) first preference votes and was eliminated on the third count. Following the election, Minister for Justice Charles Flanagan suggested that the Irish media had given O'Doherty a "free pass" for her views on immigration, after Fine Gael's candidate for the Wexford by-election, Verona Murphy, had been criticised for linking migration to Ireland with ISIS.

O'Doherty ran as an independent candidate in the Dublin Fingal constituency, in the 2020 general election. She secured 1.97% of the first preference vote and was eliminated on the fifth count.

== Opinions ==
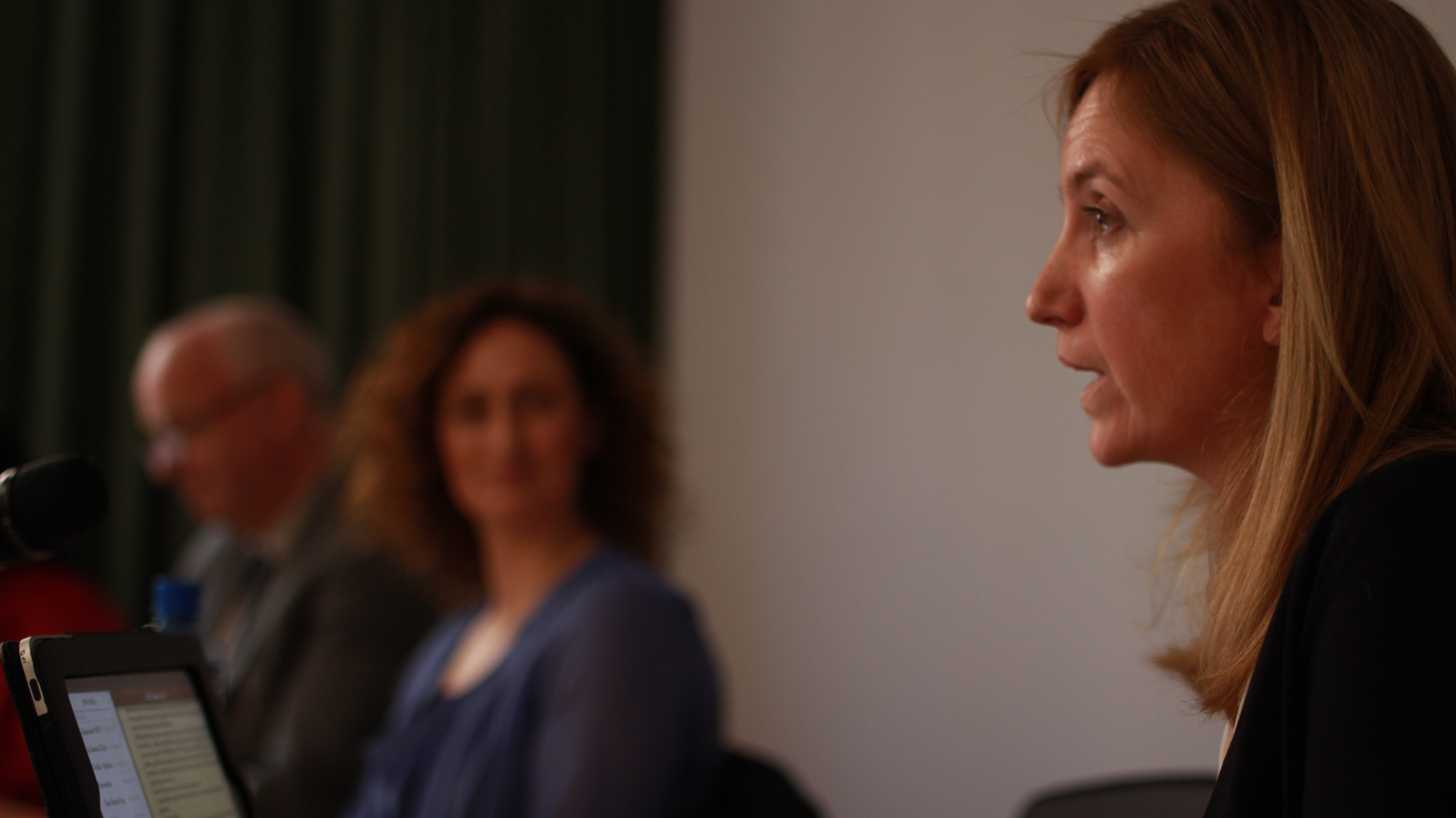
O'Doherty speaking at "Make it Happen Women's Day", 13 March 2015

O'Doherty holds conspiracy theorist views. As a journalist, she won an award for medical reporting. However, she has since claimed that there is a link between water fluoridation and cancer, and alleged that the HPV vaccine is both untested and dangerous.

In September 2018, during the presidential election campaign, O'Doherty drew criticism for her claim, described as conspiratorial, that the state colluded in the murder of journalist Veronica Guerin. The Irish political satire magazine The Phoenix called O'Doherty's claim a "credibility destroying move", and said "that ludicrous assertion helped to scupper her bid for a presidential nomination".

O'Doherty is associated with anti-immigration views, which she defends saying: "Because I have always stood up for the poor; I see the inequality. That's my academic background," she said. "That's why I'm against mass immigration, mass uncontrolled immigration as opposed to controlled immigration."

In March 2019, O'Doherty tweeted that the Christchurch mosque shootings in New Zealand had the hallmarks of a "false flag" operation to incite fresh Islamic State attacks. The tweet led to two of the four Laois councillors who endorsed her 2018 presidential nomination to rescind their support.

In September 2019, a number of media outlets reported on a tweet (published by O'Doherty and later deleted by Twitter) which led to racial abuse of a County Meath interracial couple who had appeared in an advertisement for the German-based supermarket chain Lidl. The tweet read "German dump Lidl gaslighting the Irish people with their multicultural version of 'The Ryans'. Kidding no one! Resist the Great Replacement wherever you can by giving this kip a wide berth. #ShopIrish #BuyIrish." "The Great Replacement", referred to in O'Doherty's tweet, is a white nationalist right-wing conspiracy theory. According to The Irish Times, O'Doherty threatened legal action against the couple for speaking to the newspaper about the Twitter thread and the impact it had on them and their child. Some news coverage associated the events with calls for a review of hate-crime legislation. The abuse directed at the family caused them to leave the country to return to England after receiving a threat that left them fearing for their lives. The abuse was investigated under the Garda Síochána's diversity and integration strategy (which includes hate crime).

In May 2021, O'Doherty stated in a live-streamed video that "I don't see anyone or know anyone who is gay who is happy", calling it a "miserable lifestyle".

In August 2022, the Global Project against Hate and Extremism published a report on the growth of far-right and hate groups in Ireland. The report stated that "white nationalist, anti-LGBTQ+, anti-immigrant, and anti-lockdown groups seem to be coming together and echoing each other's hateful rhetoric" and identified twelve far-right groups, including the National Party, that had experienced growth in recent years. O'Doherty's Anti-Corruption Ireland was included due to its white nationalist and anti-immigrant stances and advocacy of conspiracy theories.

=== Social media and Twitter ban (2020) ===
In March 2014, O'Doherty set up an account on Twitter (now X). In 2017, the annual "#murraytweetindex", (Note: The "#murraytweetindex" is run by Murray Communications, an established Irish public relations and communications company. It is released once a year, usually by April–May of the following year.) which ranks the influence of Twitter accounts of Irish journalists, ranked O'Doherty's Twitter account as the 7th most influential overall account, third most influential news category account, and the most retweeted account. By 2018, O'Doherty had fallen out of the top 20 most influential accounts; the "#murraytweetindex" website ranked her as the 26th-most influential overall account, but she retained her position as the third-most influential news category account.

In July 2020, the account was "permanently suspended after repeated violations of the Twitter rules".

=== YouTube ban (2019) ===
In July 2019, O'Doherty's YouTube channel was permanently removed for hate speech violations. The Irish Times reported that her account was suspended the week before after posting a video regarding ethnic minorities in Ireland; however, O'Doherty appeared to evade this ban by using an alternative account. The Times quoted a spokesman for Google saying that "both Ms O'Doherty's accounts have been removed for "repeat" breaches of its rules", and that "When users violate these policies repeatedly, such as our policies against hate speech and harassment, or our terms prohibiting circumvention of our enforcement measures, we terminate their accounts".

== Legal actions ==
=== Court action against COVID-19 legislation ===
In April 2020, O'Doherty and John Waters launched a legal action against the laws passed to deal with the COVID-19 pandemic in the Republic of Ireland. They sought to have part of the legislation declared void in the High Court, describing it as "unconstitutional", "improperly acted" and "very flawed". Waters further stated, as a basis for the claim, that the laws were brought in by a caretaker government, by a Dáil with a limited number of TDs, and enacted by an outgoing Seanad. When the matter was discussed in the High Court later in April 2020, the government's counsel expressed its opposition to the action. During the proceedings, up to 100 supporters of O'Doherty and Waters gathered at the Four Courts but were not permitted to enter the courtroom by the judge because of social distancing rules. Gardaí later announced that they were investigating the gathering at the Four Courts, stating that they had asked the group to disperse over concerns about social distancing and the rules on non-essential travel.

On 28 April 2020, at the next hearing on the matter, Gardaí and barriers prevented crowds from entering the court. About forty supporters of the applicants turned up, and no arrests were made. During the meeting, O'Doherty said that the people of Ireland were under "mass house arrest" and Gardaí were "using guns" to frighten people. At the next hearing, on 6 May 2020, O'Doherty said that the COVID-19 conditions were comparable to living in "Nazi Germany". She also said that the basis for introducing the restrictions was "scientifically fraudulent" and that evidence to that effect would be presented at the full hearing of their action. The State's representation opposed the application, saying that the claims were not arguable.

On 13 May 2020, Mr Justice Charles Meehan dismissed the applicants' case. On 2 March 2021 the Court of Appeal dismissed the appeal to permit O'Doherty and Waters to challenge the award of costs of that hearing against them. Counsel for the state argued that some of the applicants' submissions were "Bermuda Triangle stuff". A further appeal was heard by the Supreme Court in July 2022, which upheld the decision to dismiss the challenge brought by O'Doherty and Waters against the constitutionality of laws introduced in response to COVID-19.

=== Defamation ===
In September 2019, independent councillor Jimmy Guerin (brother of Veronica Guerin) took a defamation action against O'Doherty. Guerin claimed that he was defamed in comments allegedly posted by O'Doherty on Twitter and Facebook.

The High Court was told in August 2020 that she had been "actively trying to evade" service of notice of defamation proceedings. Attempts had been made to serve documents on O'Doherty, but they had not been successful. Guerin's solicitors secured orders against O'Doherty, including one that she had been formally served with the summons outlining the action against her after an ex parte hearing. O'Doherty denied that she had tried to evade service of defamation proceedings, and claimed that the defamation action was vexatious and an "outrageous attempt" to prevent her from revealing corruption. She sought orders preventing the publishing of her purported home address by the media and to have Jimmy Guerin's action against her struck out.

In October 2020, Judge Richard Humphreys ordered that there was to be no publication of O'Doherty's full address and in particular the street name or house number, house name or her email address. The judge however stated "I want to record clearly that [O'Doherty] has failed to substantiate any of her allegations of wrongdoing made against [Guerins] legal team" and awarded costs to Guerin saying that this was "to factor in my disapproval of the unsubstantiated complaints made by the [O'Doherty] against the [Guerin's] legal team".

In December 2022, O'Doherty's action against Guerin was struck out with costs awarded to Guerin, as it had been initiated outside the statute of limitations.

=== Injunction at request of Beaumont Hospital ===
In June 2021, Beaumont Hospital, Dublin sought injunctions against O'Doherty, specifically concerning videos posted online that it claimed were "clearly defamatory". Three videos posted by O'Doherty claim the hospital is a "death camp", with staff "forced" to take what was described as an "experimental Covid 19 injection" that O'Doherty alleges "has killed hundreds of thousands." Opposing the granting of the injunction, O'Doherty claimed the attempt to injunct was "spurious and outrageous"; she repeated the allegations, and said she stands over them. The High Court ruled against O'Doherty on 9 July 2021, granting the injunctions and ordering that the videos be taken down.

=== Convictions over Kilmacanogue bridge incident ===
She was arrested at the footbridge over the N11 at Kilmacanogue in August 2020. On 29 September 2021 she was found guilty at Bray Courthouse of three charges: threatening and abusive behaviour, refusing to give her name and address to a Garda and resisting arrest. She received a suspended sentence of two months and was fined €750. The judge also criticised her for deliberately saying "atrocious" things to the gardaí, including calling them traitors and accusing them of covering up paedophilia and murder, which he described as a "a clear and intentional breach of the peace".

=== Conviction for breach of lockdown laws ===
In December 2020 she travelled to Cork from Dublin in breach of lockdown regulations to attend a protest in Grand Parade. On 12 December 2020 at 4:35 pm she spoke to a crowd, claiming that COVID-19 was a "hoax" and "RTE was spreading lies on behalf of the Government".

She was later asked by a Garda if she had a reasonable excuse to leave her county, to which she claimed the Garda didn't know the constitution or his oath and that she was on "essential duties". The Garda said that she didn't carry out any journalistic duties and was protesting during restrictions.

On 16 November 2022 the judge convicted and fined her €750, giving her five months to pay. She was not in the court.

=== Legal action over use of deceased teen's photo ===
In May 2023, Edel Campbell, the mother of a teenager who died by suicide, sued O'Doherty in the High Court for "unauthorised and inappropriate use" of a photo of her son. O'Doherty had used the photo of the woman's son in an article in The Irish Light, trying to link sudden deaths to COVID-19 vaccines. The solicitor said their client had brought the case "reluctantly" but that "given the continuing conduct of Ms O'Doherty as publisher of The Irish Light newspaper our client felt she has no alternative". On 12 June, a formal complaint was also made to the Garda Síochána about the publication. Interim restraining orders against O'Doherty were granted on 23 June. They prevent O'Doherty from harassing Campbell, or from publishing Campbell's or her late son's images, or from inciting others to intimidate Campbell. The court also made orders requiring O'Doherty to remove any image of the plaintiff and her late son from any form of media that O'Doherty owns or operates. On 25 July, O'Doherty's lawyers admitted to the High Court that she was in control of a Twitter account which was alleged to have breached a previous order of the court.

In April 2024, O'Doherty was arrested and brought before the court for contempt, having failed to appear when summoned the eleven times prior. It was alleged that O'Doherty had breached the issued restraining order on numerous occasions. She stated that she couldn't comply with the order, claiming that it was an "illegal injunction" because the court is not permitted to be funded by third-parties, referring to a GoFundMe fundraiser for the case. O'Doherty used the trial to promote her anti-vaccine journalism. When the case was adjourned, O'Doherty was released from custody on condition that she attend the next hearing. O'Doherty later requested for the judge be recused when she learned he previously served as a barrister for former Garda Commissioner Martin Callinan.

== Awards ==
- 2000 ESB National Media Awards for "Print Campaigning and Social Issues".
- 2011 GlaxoSmithKline Irish Medical Media Awards for "Consumer Print Media".
- 2011 International Journalism Festival Award for "Best Travel Writing".
