= Tonight with Vincent Browne =

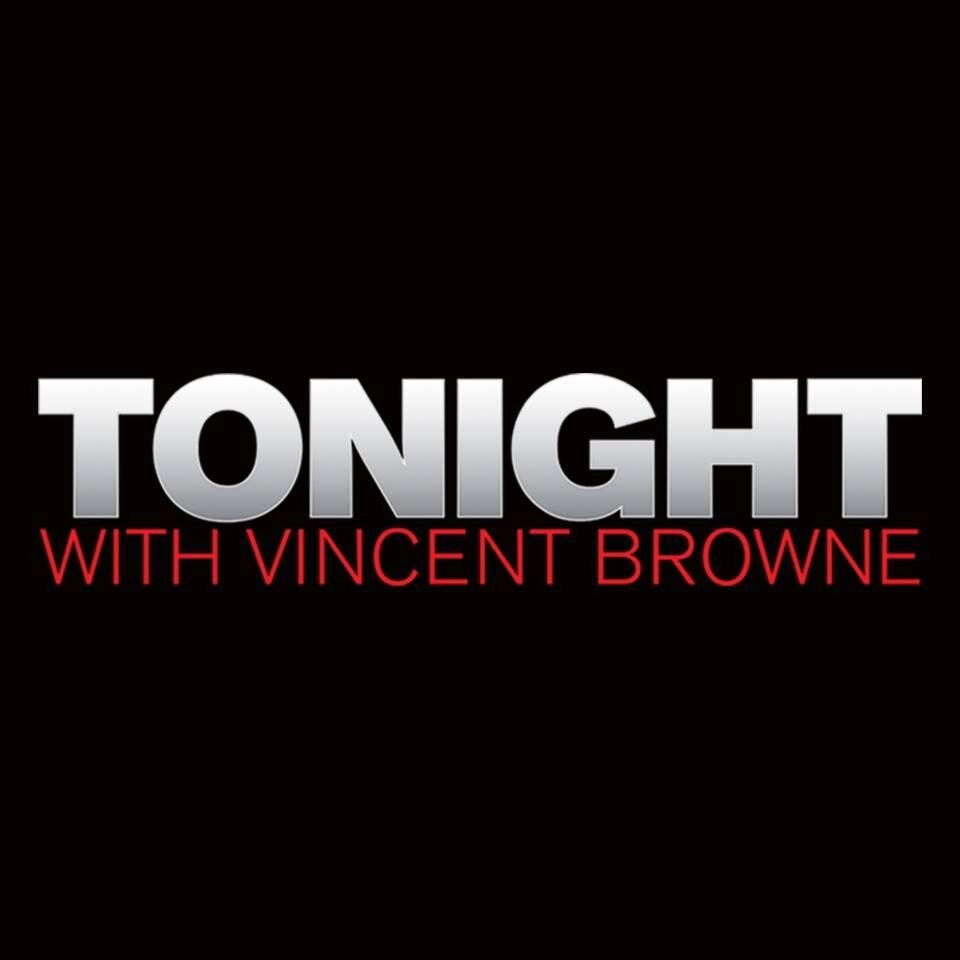
- Tonight title card
- Genre: Current affairs
- Presented by: Vincent Browne
- Country of origin: Ireland
- Original language: English

Production
- Production locations: Ballymount, Dublin 24
- Running time: 45 minutes

Original release
- Network: TV3
- Release: 4 September 2007 – 27 July 2017

Related
- The People's Debate with Vincent Browne

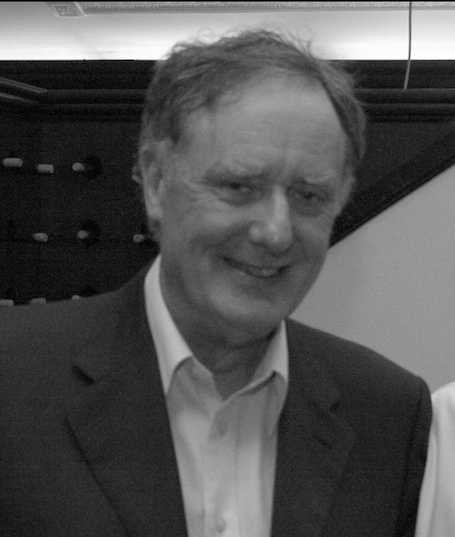
Vincent Browne was the presenter of the programme

Former logo of TV3 Nightly News

Tonight with Vincent Browne (formerly Nightly News with Vincent Browne) is a news analysis, current affairs and politics programme which was broadcast on Ireland's TV3 from 2007 to July 2017. Its time on air coincided with the premierships of Brian Cowen and Enda Kenny, bookended by the conclusion of Bertie Ahern's premiership and the initial weeks of Leo Varadkar's. The Tonight Show, hosted by Ivan Yates (initially) and Matt Cooper, replaced it in mid-September 2017.

It was moderated by Vincent Browne — a journalist noted for his rather acerbic style, with The Guardian describing him as "Ireland's Jeremy Paxman".

== Format ==
It was broadcast on Monday to Thursday nights, usually from 23:05 to 23:55, though it was occasionally extended during referendums and general elections. When Browne was absent, another person presented instead: this was typically one of other presenters, others Ger Colleran, Declan Ganley, Tom McGurk, Mary O'Rourke, Sam Smyth or Ivan Yates. When anyone other than Vincent Browne hosted the show, it was simply called Tonight. Each year, approaching the Christmas period, Browne gave out political awards to deserving recipients.

Tonight with Vincent Browne moved to TV3's Sony HD studio but vacated it for two weeks while RTÉ borrowed it to film School Around the Corner, hosted by Ray D'Arcy.

== History ==
Tonight with Vincent Browne is noted for having coerced various experienced politicians, including Joan Burton and Conor Lenihan, into embarrassing meltdowns live on air. Burton asked Browne if he was "asking me a question or just trying to harangue me?" and then set about repeatedly interrupting Joe Higgins leading Browne to interject: "Joan, you get hyper-irritated when anyone harangues you so please don't harangue Joe", but to no avail as Burton continued to interrupt. When Conor Lenihan refused to resign over the Brian Cowen leadership vote, Lenihan stood up angrily, glared, pointed his finger at Browne and sneered, "It's easy for you to be cynical about people who go into public life and I really do resent the sneering insinuation that you're trying to put to me", with Browne responding, "Conor, you're not going to shout me down and you can take me full-on on this if you like" which is exactly what happened. Lenihan lost his seat dramatically in the general election the following February.

After airing an interview with Fianna Fáil politicians Charlie O'Connor and Darragh O'Brien, recorded outside Leinster House following the vote of confidence in then Taoiseach Brian Cowen, Browne popped up onscreen back in the studio and remarked: "God, it would do your head in, wouldn't it?".

Banking analyst Peter Mathews made a name for himself with regular appearances on the programme and was later elected to the Dáil.

In August 2012, Cian O'Connor gave his first television interview since winning a bronze medal at the London Olympics to stand-in presenter Tom McGurk, while lawyer Eddie Hayes was interviewed by Sam Smyth on the show the following week.

The programme was critical in informing the Irish public about the death of Savita Halappanavar as the news was breaking.

On the night of 28 May 2015, with Browne mysteriously absent and the programme instead moderated by Ger Colleran (editor of Independent News & Media's Irish Daily Star), Colleran read a statement from TV3 management asserting that no discussion about Independent TD Catherine Murphy's comments in the Dáil that day would be permitted following letters from billionaire businessman and INM controller Denis O'Brien's lawyers. O'Brien had earlier successfully applied for an injunction against RTÉ preventing the state broadcaster from airing a report on O'Brien was receiving, with the direct permission of former CEO of the Irish Bank Resolution Corporation (IBRC)—the former Anglo Irish Bank, a rate of approximately 1.25% when IBRC should have been charging 7.5%. This in turn led to outstanding sums of upwards of €500 million. O'Brien then wrote to special liquidator Kieran Wallace to demand that these same favourable terms that were granted him by way of verbal agreement be continued. The Irish government later appointed Kieran Wallace to conduct an investigation into these same dealings. Wallace then colluded with IBRC and Denis O'Brien to seek an injunction in Ireland's High Court to hide this information from the public. High court Judge Donald Binchy granted O'Brien the injunction and told the court that certain elements of the judgement would have to be redacted. The Irish media therefore could not report on details of the injunction. When Independent TD Catherine Murphy managed to successfully raise this in the Dáil on 28 May 2015, lawyers acting for O'Brien immediately forced the country's media to censor its own coverage. Foreign commentators covering these events for the international media suggested Irish democracy had been "wiped away at a stroke". Some enterprising citizens received a positive response by printing Catherine Murphy's speech from foreign media coverage and handing copies to passers-by on the streets of the nation's towns and cities in an attempt to inform those relying on state media.

On Monday 27 July 2015, Tonight with Vincent Browne was temporarily replaced with The Late Review during the summer recess. Browne's programme returned that September.

Frequently absent with illness and exhaustion brought on by a tour of the nation with The People's Debate, (and substituted by such names as Ivan Yates and Matt Cooper), on 3 May 2016 Browne returned to the chair after a break that overlapped with the 2016 general election. Listening to Damien English speak well of his party, Fine Gael, on their stance over water, Browne declared "fucking amazing" that "the fella who made a real cock-up" (former environment minister Phil Hogan) had been promoted to the European Commission. Browne immediately explained his indiscretion as follows: "I'm sorry, I've been off for a few weeks". Media hailed it as a moment of "Classic Vincent!".

Brown presented his last show on the 27 July 2017, when Leo Varadkar (who had recently become Taoiseach for the first time) was a guest.

== Contributors ==
While politicians often featured, other contributors included:

- Robert Ballagh
- Mick Clifford
- Eoghan Corry
- Siobhan Creaton
- Eamon Delaney
- Robert Fisk
- Constantin Gurdgiev
- Justine McCarthy
- Paul Anthony McDermott
- Patsy McGarry
- John McGuirk
- Julien Mercille
- Senan Molony
- Eoin Ó Murchú
- Jim Power
- Kathy Sheridan
- Noel Whelan (Fianna Fáil adviser, though here in the role of political analyst)

Past contributors at the time of the programme's conclusion included:

- Sarah Carey
- Derek Davis (died in May 2015)
- Cassie Stokes

== Ratings ==
Despite airing on what is usually considered a graveyard slot, the show has been highly successful with on average 166,000 viewers. However, when TV3 temporarily replaced Tonight with Vincent Browne with UK celebrity reality show I'm a Celebrity...Get Me Out of Here! in November 2011, its RTÉ rival The Frontline gained nearly 70,000 viewers.
