= The Frontline (Irish TV programme) =

Topical debate television programme in Ireland

- Directed by: David Donaghy
- Presented by: Pat Kenny
- Country of origin: Ireland
- Original languages: English, Irish
- No. of seasons: 4

Production
- Producer: Dave Nally
- Production locations: Studio 4, RTÉ Television Centre, Donnybrook, Dublin, Ireland
- Running time: 60 minutes

Original release
- Network: RTÉ One
- Release: 21 September 2009 – 28 January 2013

Related
- Questions and Answers; Prime Time

The Frontline is a topical debate television programme in Ireland, which aired for 60 minutes every Monday night on RTÉ One at 22:30. It debuted on Monday, 21 September 2009. The Frontline replaced a similar political analysis show Questions and Answers. The programme features around an invited audience and featured guests.

Many public figures politicians have appeared on the programme. Some incidents on the programme have attracted a large amount of media coverage. The programme has generally received positive reviews. The programme is broadcast from Studio 4 in RTÉ. The first programme received an audience share of 43.4%, with a viewing audience of 464,000. Later into the programme 100,000 fewer people watched it, watching The Apprentice instead. It won "Best Current Affairs programme" at the 7th Irish Film and Television Awards in February 2010.

The show returned in September 2012. However, RTÉ announced in October 2012 that the show would be revamped in early 2013. In November 2012, media reports indicated that this revamp would involve The Frontline being axed and replaced with Prime Time: Debate, and that the new show would be similar to The Frontline but under the Prime Time branding. The Frontline aired for the final time on 28 January 2013.

== Format ==
The Frontline was hosted by former The Late Late Show presenter and RTÉ Radio 1 presenter Pat Kenny. The programme runs for 60 minutes on Monday nights on RTÉ One. It was directed by David Donaghy and produced by Dave Nally. Studio 4 in the RTÉ Television Centre was the venue of the programme. That was also used for The Late Late Show.

The show differed from its predecessor Questions and Answers in that the show does not entirely focus on a panel. The show regularly featured one-on-one interviews with key political and social figures, such as the Minister for Finance and the Leader of the Labour Party, as well as specially themed shows. Other formats include a panel from various social and political backgrounds discussing political issues affecting Ireland and the wider world. The programme debates "the most important news stories of the week". The programme also features debate on "major political, economic and social issues". The programme also features some satire.

Steve Carson, head of programming in RTÉ Television, said the programme wouldn't be a replica of the old format. An audience also features as part of the discussion similar to Questions and Answers.

For the beginning of the programme, Kenny "zips around the studio, microphone in hand".

"The core of it will remain that audiences get a chance to ask politicians questions, but the format will be a lot more varied".

— Steve Carson, head of programming in RTÉ Television.

== History ==
The first indication that Pat Kenny would present another television programme, was on the night he announced his departure from presenting The Late Late Show. By the time of presenting his last programme, it was announced a new current affairs programme would begin in autumn 2009. It was later announced that it would be 21 September 2009.

There was a high demand for tickets, which RTÉ described as phenomenal. 4,000 applications were received for a capacity of 120 seats (originally 60 for Questions and Answers, which was subsequently doubled). A public invitation for comments and ideas on topics was issued by the makers of the show.

The first programme had guests such as Eamon Dunphy, Fintan O'Toole, Pat Farrell, Tom Parlon and Brian Lenihan, Minister for Finance. Audience members included small business people and mortgage holders. Lenihan talked about the proposed National Asset Management Agency and the purchase of €28 billion in loans from Anglo Irish Bank.

As a result of cutbacks, RTÉ could only afford to spend €2 on sandwiches per audience member.

The programme won "Best Current Affairs programme" at the 7th Irish Film and Television Awards on 20 February 2010. Kenny accepted the award.

A special programme about the aftermath of sudden recession aired in May 2010.

The programme returned to RTÉ One on 20 September 2010.

There was a previous Frontline during the end of the 1970s and beginning of the 1980s in between The Politics Programme and Today Tonight. ‘Frontline’ was an investigative report and analysis programme on issues of the day from Brian Farrell, Michael Heney, Forbes McFall and Michael Ryan.

=== Ratings ===
For the first two programmes, viewing figures were above the programme's predecessor Questions and Answers. The first programme had an initial audience of 464,000 viewers. Overall, the second programme reached an audience of 653,000. In November 2009, the viewership was reduced to 333,000, less than the 493,000 received by The Apprentice on TV3 When George Lee appeared on the programme explaining his resignation from politics on 8 February 2010, the viewing figures were at 627,000.

The Frontline gained nearly 70,000 viewers when TV3 temporarily replaced its rival Tonight with Vincent Browne with UK celebrity torture show I'm a Celebrity...Get Me Out of Here! in November 2011.

=== Incidents ===
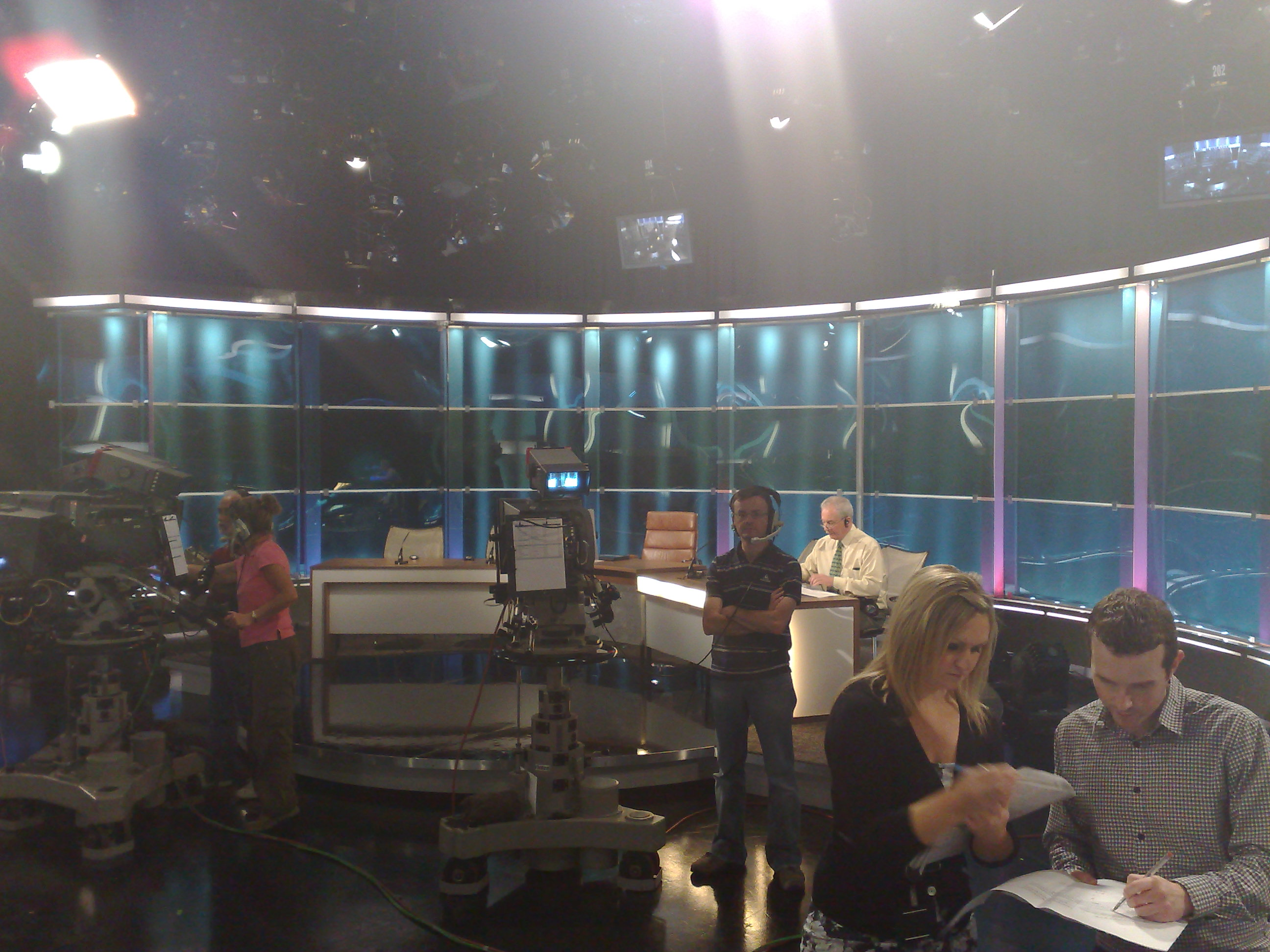
The Frontline's studio before the first broadcast

On 2 November 2009, Jack O'Connor of SIPTU suggested that in the 2010 budget, "a reasonable level of tax" should be placed on "Trophy Houses". Kenny responded by asking what is a trophy house. To this O'Connor responded with "A house like yours, probably." After some hesitation, Kenny quoted:

I built my house in 1988. Like, why is that a trophy house? I don't want this kind of crap coming at me.

O'Connor then apologised instantly.

The following week (9 November 2009), during an interview with Mary Hanafin, Alan O'Brien (who has a conviction from 2006 for incitement to hatred), a member of the audience, spent three minutes accusing Kenny of "pontificating and moralising" people on social welfare, despite being in receipt of a €600,000 salary. Then referring to a previous court case involving Kenny, he concluded by saying, "Now I am going to sue an old woman for a field because I feel I might make a million or more." After being removed by security, the programme continued.

Days before the 2011 presidential election, a debate was held between the candidates on The Frontline. A tweet was read out by Pat Kenny which caused Seán Gallagher, ahead on opinion polling, to falter on live television. Michael D. Higgins subsequently won the election. A member of Gallagher's campaign team described it as an "earth shattering" moment for Seán Gallagher. Gallagher later took RTÉ to court over its role in the sabotage of his election campaign.

During the debate held on 21 May 2012 concerning the Irish European Fiscal Compact referendum, Pat Kenny got down on his hands and knees and shouted at a farmer in the audience to shut up. He also promised a debate on the CAP "in January"—scheduling of which would have occurred two months after it was announced that The Frontline had been axed.

== Reception ==
The programme generally received a "big thumbs up". Patrick Freyne of the Sunday Tribune described the programme, in his television review column, as "the People versus A Bunch of Bastards". He also called it "slick, pacy and well-researched". Hilary Fannin writing in The Irish Times, predicted that the programme, in relation to the economy, "will [not] be allowed to debate much else in the months to come". She also rated it as one of the best current affairs programmes in 2009. The two reviewers said that, compared to The Late Late Show, Kenny was more "in his comfort zone". Sarah Carey, also in The Irish Times, was disappointed by the tone of the programme even though Kenny was "thoroughly enjoying himself". She said it was a televised version of Liveline.

Future President of Ireland Michael D. Higgins, then a Labour Party TD, said in February 2010 that The Frontline "degrade[d] politics" and called it a "really bad programme".
