= The People's Debate with Vincent Browne =

- Genre: Politics
- Presented by: Vincent Browne
- Country of origin: Ireland
- Original language: English
- No. of episodes: 46

Production
- Running time: 120 minutes

Original release
- Network: TV3
- Release: 5 March 2014 – 22 February 2016

Related
- Tonight with Vincent Browne

The People's Debate with Vincent Browne was a topical debate TV3 television programme in Ireland. Presented by Vincent Browne, the two-hour-long broadcast occurred before a studio audience where audience members participated on the chosen subject(s). Initially airing on the first Wednesday of every month at 10 pm, in the months ahead of the 2016 general election it took to airing more regularly as it undertook a tour of all Dáil Éireann constituencies.

== Origins ==
The People's Debate was launched by TV3 on 12 February 2014. The programme was described as an "experiment in democracy television" featuring a "range of hard hitting, intelligent and probing topics" with "no boundaries as it deals with serious current affairs issues in Ireland from topical matters, political discussion, economics and the affairs of the nation."

The first transmission occurred on Wednesday 5 March 2014. The final show aired on 22 February 2016.

== Chairman ==
The programme was chaired by Vincent Browne, who also presents the four-times weekly Tonight with Vincent Browne.

Browne described the programme as "a new experiment in Irish television". He claimed: "This will be TV3's largest audience show to date with 150–200 people debating the important national issues of the day. There will be no panel of the usual important suspects – if the usual important suspects want to participate they will do so on the same basis as everyone else. This is democracy television."

== List of episodes ==
#	Motion	Broadcast date
1	That the Fine Gael-Labour Government deserves the support of the Irish people	5 March 2014
2	That Irish women are not yet liberated	2 April 2014
3	That the Irish people should elect Eurosceptic candidates in the upcoming European elections	7 May 2014
4	That Ireland is homophobic	4 June 2014
5	That Budget 2015 should prioritise the relief of the squeezed middle income earners	1 October 2014

Tour of constituencies

Browne toured the Dáil Éireann constituencies with the programme throughout 2015 and early 2016 (ahead of a general election), concluding with the constituencies of the four leaders of the parties with the largest representation in the 31st Dáil. The ruling party, Fine Gael, boycotted many of the early debates.

Constituency	Sitting TDs^{1}	Excuses offered by absentees	Broadcast location	Broadcast date	Date recorded (if different)
Wicklow	Stephen Donnelly, Andrew Doyle, Anne Ferris, Simon Harris, Billy Timmins		Grand Hotel in Wicklow	Wednesday, 14 January 2015	Saturday, 10 January 2015
Clare	Pat Breen, Joe Carey, Timmy Dooley, Michael McNamara		Auburn Lodge Hotel in Ennis	Wednesday, 21 January 2015	Friday, 16 January 2015
Cork North-West	Áine Collins, Michael Creed, Michael Moynihan		Charleville Park Hotel	Wednesday, 28 January 2015	Friday, 23 January 2015
^{2}Donegal	Pearse Doherty, Charlie McConalogue, Joe McHugh, Pádraig Mac Lochlainn, Thomas Pringle		Clanree Hotel in Letterkenny	Wednesday, 4 February 2015	Friday, 30 January 2015
^{2}Cavan–Monaghan	Seán Conlan, Heather Humphriesies, Caoimhghín Ó Caoláin, Joe O'Reilly, Brendan Smith		Errigal Hotel in Cootehill	Wednesday, 25 February 2015	Monday, 23 February 2015
Dublin North-West	Dessie Ellis, John Lyons, Róisín Shortall		The Regency Hotel, Swords Road	Wednesday, 4 March 2015	Monday, 2 March 2015
Sligo–Leitrim	Michael Colreavy, John Perry, Tony Mcloughlin	Perry promised until that morning then said he had another engagement; didn't reply to several attempts at contact. Mcloughlin refused.	The Clarion Hotel in Sligo Town	Wednesday, 11 March 2015	Monday, 9 March 2015
Meath West	Peadar Tóibín, Damien English Ray Butler		The Knightsbrook Hotel in Trim	Wednesday, 25 March 2015	Monday, 23 March 2015
Dublin Mid-West	Frances Fitzgerald, Robert Dowds, Derek Keating, Joanna Tuffy		Red Cow Moran Hotel	Wednesday, 1 April 2015	Monday, 30 March 2015
Kildare North	Bernard Durkan, Anthony Lawlor, Catherine Murphy, Emmet Stagg		Killashee House Hotel in Naas	Wednesday, 15 April 2015	Monday, 13 April 2015
Galway West	Noel Grealish, Seán Kyne, Éamon Ó Cuív, Brian Walsh, Derek Nolan		Galway Bay Hotel in Salthill	Wednesday, 22 April 2015	Monday, 20 April 2015
Limerick County	Niall Collins, Dan Neville, Patrick O'Donovan		Rathkeale House Hotel	Wednesday, 29 April 2015	Monday, 27 April 2015
Meath East	Regina Doherty, Dominic Hannigan, Helen McEntee	McEntee said she had an illness.	Headfort Arms Hotel in Kells	Wednesday, 13 May 2015	Monday, 11 May 2015
Waterford	Paudie Coffey, Ciara Conway, John Deasy, John Halligan	Deasy "couldn't be bothered" according to Browne	Tower Hotel	Wednesday, 20 May 2015	Monday, 18 May 2015
Dublin South-Central	Catherine Byrne, Eric Byrne, Michael Conaghan, Joan Collins, Aengus Ó Snodaigh	Michael Conaghan "couldn't be bothered" according to Browne	Our Lady's Hall in Drimnagh	Wednesday, 3 June 2015^{3}	Monday, 25 May 2015 or 1 June 2015?^{3}
Laois	Charles Flanagan, Seán Fleming, Brian Stanley		Abbeyleix Manor Hotel	Wednesday, 10 June 2015	Monday, 8 June 2015
Galway East	Ciarán Cannon, Paul Connaughton Jnr, Michael Kitt, Colm Keaveney		Raheen Woods Hotel in Athenry	Wednesday, 17 June 2015	Monday, 15 June 2015
Kerry	Jimmy Deenihan, Martin Ferris, Brendan Griffin, Tom Fleming, Michael Healy-Rae, Arthur Spring	Deenihan was abroad at the time, representing the government in San Francisco following the Berkeley balcony collapse.	Gleneagle Hotel in Killarney	Wednesday, 24 June 2015	Monday, 22 June 2015
Dublin Rathdown	Peter Mathews, Olivia Mitchell, Shane Ross, Alan Shatter, Alex White		Brass Bar at the Stillorgan Park Hotel	Wednesday, 1 July 2015	Monday, 29 June 2015
Offaly	Marcella Corcaran Kennedy, Barry Cowen		Tullamore Court Hotel	Wednesday, 8 July 2015	Monday, 6 July 2015
Dublin Bay North	Tommy Broughan, Richard Bruton, Terence Flanagan, Finian McGrath, Aodhán Ó Ríordáin		Clontarf Hotel	Wednesday, 9 September 2015	Monday, 7 September 2015
Roscommon–Galway	Michael Fitzmaurice, Denis Naughten		The Abbey Hotel, Conference and Leisure Centre in Roscommon	Wednesday, 16 September 2015	Monday, 14 September 2015
Carlow–Kilkenny	John Paul Phelan, Pat Deering, Bobby Alyward, John McGuinness, Ann Phelan (Arrived Late)		The Woodford Dolmen Hotel in Carlow	Wednesday, 23 September 2015	Monday, 21 September 2015
Cork South-West	Jim Daly, Noel Harrington, Michael McCarthy		The Maritime Hotel in Bantry	Wednesday, 30 September 2015	Monday, 28 September 2015
Dublin South-West	Seán Crowe, Eamonn Maloney, Paul Murphy, Pat Rabbitte		St Anne's GAA Club	Wednesday, 7 October 2015	Monday, 5 October 2015
Dublin Central	Joe Costello, Paschal Donohoe, Mary Lou McDonald, Maureen O'Sullivan		DCU St Patrick's Campus	Wednesday, 21 October 2015	Monday, 19 October 2015
Dún Laoghaire	Seán Barrett, Richard Boyd Barrett, Eamon Gilmore, Mary Mitchell O'Connor		The Royal Marine Hotel	Wednesday, 4 November 2015	Monday, 2 November 2015
Wexford	Paul Kehoe, Liam Twomey,James Browne, Brendan Howlin, Mick Wallace		White's Hotel	Wednesday, 11 November 2015	Monday, 9 November 2015
Tipperary	Séamus Healy, Alan Kelly, Michael Lowry, Mattie McGrath, Noel Coonan, Tom Hayes	Kelly promised he would appear but never arrived.	Clonmel Park Hotel	Wednesday, 18 November 2015	Monday, 16 November 2015
Cork North-Central	Billy Kelleher, Kathleen Lynch, Dara Murphy, Jonathan O'Brien		The Commons Inn, Commons Road, Cork	Wednesday, 25 November 2015	Monday, 23 November 2015
Dublin Bay South	Lucinda Creighton, Kevin Humpheys, Eoghan Murphy		The Ballsbridge Hotel	Wednesday, 2 December 2015	Monday, 30 November 2015
Limerick City	Michael Noonan, Willie O'Dea, Kieran O'Donnell, Jan O'Sullivan		The Limerick Strand Hotel	Wednesday, 9 December 2015	Monday, 7 December 2015
Kildare South	Seán Ó Fearghaíl , Martin Heydon		The Keadeen Hotel in Newbridge	Wednesday, 6 January 2016	Monday, 4 January 2016
Dublin Fingal	Clare Daly, Alan Farrell, James Reilly, Brendan Ryan		The Grand Hotel in Malahide	Wednesday, 13 January 2016	Monday, 11 January 2016
Cork East	Seán Sherlock, David Stanton, Tom Barry, Sandra McLellan		The Firgrove Hotel in Mitchelstown	Wednesday, 27 January 2016	Monday, 25 January 2016
Longford–Westmeath	James Bannon, Gabrielle McFadden,Willie Penrose, Robert Troy		The Grenville Arms Hotel in Mullingar	Wednesday, 3 February 2016	Monday, 1 February 2016^{4}
Cork South-Central	Jerry Buttimer, Simon Coveney, Ciarán Lynch, Micheál Martin, Michael McGrath		The Rochestown Park Hotel in Cork	Tuesday, 9 February 2016	N/A
Louth	Gerry Adams, Peter Fitzpatrick, Ged Nash, Fergus O'Dowd		The Carrickdale Hotel in Dundalk	Wednesday, 17 February 2016	N/A
Dublin West	Tánaiste Joan Burton, Ruth Coppinger, Leo Varadkar		The Carlton Hotel in Blanchardstown	Thursday, 18 February 2016	N/A
Mayo	Dara Calleary, Taoiseach Enda Kenny, Michelle Mulherin, Michael Ring		Mayo Convention Centre at the TF Royal Hotel in Castlebar	Monday, 22 February 2016	N/A

- 1. TDs present at a debate among their constituents are marked in green. TDs absent from a debate among their constituents are marked in red.
- 2. Between debates No. 4 and No. 5 (Donegal and Cavan–Monaghan), there occurred a studio debate on 11 February 2015 on the upcoming marriage referendum.
- 3. Transmission postponed from 27 May due to unspecified scheduling difficulties (possibly the airing of the Europa League Final football game, which occurred on the same night)
- 4. Originally announced for Monday 18 January 2016, then abruptly postponed.
