= The Late Late Show season 53 =

The 53rd season of the Irish television programme, The Late Late Show, the world's longest-running chat show, began on 5 September 2014 and is expected to conclude in May 2015. Ryan Tubridy's sixth season as host, it airs on RTÉ One each Friday evening from 21:30.

Local guests this season included Bosco, Bono and The Edge, Tánaiste Joan Burton, Alan Shatter (months after his resignation as minister for justice), Des O'Malley, Francis Brennan, Liz O'Donnell, Micheál Martin and Dustin the Turkey. A panel debate on Irish Water in October was followed by an interview with Anti-Austerity Alliance TD Paul Murphy in February, after which Tubridy's style of questioning came in for much criticism. A trio of Gleesons (Brendan, Domhnall and Brian) were interviewed on the same night in December.

International guests interviewed this season included Eva Longoria, Alan Rickman, Dominic West, Ryan O'Neal, Russell Crowe and Richard E. Grant (the latter alongside Gabriel Byrne). English actors Michael Palin and John Cleese, both of the comedy troupe Monty Python, were interviewed over consecutive episodes in December.

The season closed with a dance special and a tribute by Giles, Brady and Dunphy to Bill O'Herlihy after his death earlier that week.

== Sponsorship ==
Sky Broadband sponsored the show for a second year.

== Declining audience ratings ==
Audience ratings declined considerably (at one point even The Saturday Night Show attracted more viewers).

== Sinéad O'Connor ==
The singer used her appearance this season (21 November edition) to call for non-violent revolution. She did so from Tubridy's chair, having convinced him to swap places with her.

== Paul Murphy interview ==
On 20 February 2015, Tubridy interviewed Anti-Austerity Alliance TD Paul Murphy in relation to the campaign against the implementation of a water tax. The interview proved frustrating, with many expressing annoyance at the tone and some of the questions asked. Opponents of the water tax praised Murphy on social media for what was said to have been his restraint during the interview. Much commentary was critical of Tubridy. Murphy himself described his encounter with Tubridy as "an exercise in badgering and trying to make me responsible for things that are nothing to do with me", a reference to Tubridy's attempts to link him to a protests against President Michael D. Higgins which he said he had nothing to do with. Julien Mercille, the academic and writer of The Political Economy and Media Coverage of the European Economic Crisis: The Case of Ireland, observed that "Tubridy was pretty good from the standpoint of protecting government interests. [...] He asked all the right questions to try to discredit the water charges protests and Paul Murphy".

- http://www.independent.ie/entertainment/television/ryan-oneal-interview-shocks-crowe-and-late-late-viewers-31085447.html

== Special editions ==
The Late Late Toy Show took place on 28 November.

A Valentine's Day edition aired on 13 February 2015 attracted an extraordinary number of complaints. One of the show's guests, Ronan O'Gara, even talked about "getting up on Jessica"; Tubridy covered his mouth in shock upon hearing this vulgarity. O'Gara later admitted he had drunk two coffees and nothing else before the interview.

Eurosong took place on 27 February 2015.

The final episode of the season was a charity dancing special. It did, however, manage to work in a tribute by Giles, Brady and Dunphy to Bill O'Herlihy after his death earlier that week (others like George Hamilton and Après Match's Risteárd Cooper were spoken to as members of the audience).

== Episode list ==
No.	Original release date	Guest(s)	Musical/entertainment guest(s)
1	5 September 2014	Maria Walsh (2014 Rose of Tralee)	Interskalactic
2	12 September 2014	The Script	The Script
3	19 September 2014	Tom Vaughan-Lawlor	Sharon Corr
4	26 September 2014	Kelly McDonagh Mongan and family	Margo
5	3 October 2014	Ed Sheeran	Ed Sheeran
6	10 October 2014	Majella O'Donnell	The Riptide Movement
7	17 October 2014	Emily Ratajkowski	Mary Black
8	24 October 2014	Bono and The Edge	Bono and The Edge
9	31 October 2014	Brian O'Driscoll	Music from Grease
10	7 November 2014	Eva Longoria	Madness
The Longoria interview was recorded in advance on 4 November
11	14 November 2014	Saoirse Ronan	HomeTown
12	21 November 2014	Sinéad O'Connor	The Coronas
13	28 November 2014	Various children	TBA
The Late Late Toy Show
14	5 December 2014	Brendan O'Carroll and Jennifer Gibney	Olly Murs
15	12 December 2014	Brendan, Domhnall and Brian Gleeson	Imelda May
16	19 December 2014	Take That	Take That
17	9 January 2015	Michael O'Leary	Celtic Woman
First episode using the new Late Late set
18	16 January 2015	Stephanie Roche	Bay City Rollers
19	23 January 2015	Mikey North and Ian Puleston-Davies	TBA
20	30 January 2015	Donncha O'Callaghan	Mike Denver
21	6 February 2015	Nick Munier, John Walsh from Shebeen on Wheels, Vogue Williams, Kodaline, Maia Dunphy, Siobhan O'Connor, Moe Dunford and Terry McMahon, Father Pierre 'Jalapeno' Pepper	Kodaline
22	13 February 2015	Louis Walsh	James Bay, Altan
Valentine's Day special
23	20 February 2015	Marco Pierre White	The Shires and Dónal Lunny
24	27 February 2015	Phil Coulter, Mairead Farrell, Panti Bliss and Linda Martin	Phil Coulter and Niamh Kavanagh (performance of Coulter's song "Congratulations")
Eurosong 2015 (Marty Whelan also featured and presented from backstage)
25	6 March 2015	Mary Berry	The Overtones
26	13 March 2015	Ibrahim Halawa's sisters	The Kilfenora Céilí Band
27	20 March 2015	Maria Walsh (Rose of Tralee) and Adi Roche	Jersey Boys
Russell Crowe also performed with the house band
28	27 March 2015	Barry Cummins and Dearbhail McDonald	HomeTown
29	3 April 2015	Liam Cunningham	Paul Brady
30	10 April 2015	Jack Reynor and Gerard Barrett	Albert Hammond
31	17 April 2015	Michael Lyster	Charley Pride
32	24 April 2015	Killian Scott and Peter Coonan	Mamma Mia
33	1 May 2015	Jennifer Maguire and Darren Kennedy	The Three Degrees
34	8 May 2015	Jason Byrne	Don McLean
35	15 May 2015	Jim Sheridan	Once the Musical, Dublin
36	22 May 2015	RTÉ Washington correspondent Caitriona Perry	Nathan Carter
37	29 May 2015	Giles, Brady and Dunphy pay tribute to Bill O'Herlihy	Dancing, dancing and still more dancing
