= Pablo Foncillas Díaz-Plaja =

- Born: August 23, 1973 (age 53); Barcelona, Spain
- Education: University of Barcelona (LLB); IESE Business School (MBA); University of Navarra (PhD)
- Occupations: Business school lecturer, author, speaker
- Known for: Marketing, sales, digital transformation
- Board member of: Globalpraxis; Fundación Exit

Pablo Foncillas Díaz-Plaja (born 23 August 1973, Barcelona) is a Spanish business school lecturer and author. He has taught in IESE Business School and at other business schools in Europe and Latin America. He is also a public speaker and has given a talk at TEDxBarcelona.

== Early life and education ==
Foncillas was born in Barcelona on 23 August 1973. He attended the Swiss School of Barcelona.

He holds a law degree from the University of Barcelona and an MBA from IESE Business School. He later completed a PhD in digital transformation at the University of Navarra.

== Career ==
Since the 1990s, Foncillas combined roles in industry with academic and consulting work, holding positions at companies including Port Aventura, Aramark and Spanair.

He was a faculty member at IESE Business School for about a decade. He has taught students and participants from institutions including New York University Stern School of Business, ESADE, IE Business School, San Telmo Business School, Universidad del Pacífico (Peru), UCD Michael Smurfit Graduate Business School and INSEAD–CEDEP. His work focuses on digital transformation and its impact on business models.

In 2015, Foncillas spoke at a TEDxBarcelona Salon event held at the Mazda Space in Barcelona. His talk, titled "El fracaso: claves para fallar con éxito" ("How to fail successfully"), addressed the management of failure in organisations and argued for a culture that treats failure as part of learning and innovation.

Foncillas writes regularly for La Vanguardia and Clarín, and contributes to Harvard Deusto Business Review. His commentary has appeared on RTVE and on COPE. He has served on advisory and governing boards of Fundación Exit and Globalpraxis.

== Books ==
- Moda en el entorno digital (EUNSA, 2015, co-author). ISBN 978-84-313-3026-2
- Sin miedo al cambio (EUNSA, 2016). ISBN 978-84-313-3119-1
- Winners: El método para ganar clientes en la era de Amazon (Conecta / Penguin Random House, 2019). ISBN 978-84-16883-54-7
- El supermercado (Thomson Reuters Aranzadi, 2019, co-author). ISBN 978-84-1308-362-9
- Fact Energy. La sostenibilidad que viene (Deusto, 2021). ISBN 978-84-234-3243-1
- Maestros del juego (Conecta / Penguin Random House, 2023, co-author). ISBN 978-84-17992-69-9
