= Questions and Answers (TV programme) =

1986–2009 Irish topical debate TV show

- The final title card of the programme when it ended in 2009
- Genre: Current affairs
- Presented by: John Bowman (1988–2009); Olivia O'Leary (1986–1988)
- Country of origin: Ireland
- Original language: English

Production
- Production locations: Studio 2, RTÉ Television Centre, Donnybrook, Dublin 4, Ireland
- Camera setup: Multi-camera
- Running time: 45–60 minutes

Original release
- Network: RTÉ One
- Release: 2 November 1986 – 29 June 2009

Related
- The Frontline

Questions and Answers is a topical debate television programme broadcast in Ireland for 23 years between 1986 and 2009.

Similar in format to the BBC television programme Question Time, it originally aired on Sunday nights but later moved to Monday nights when it was usually shown at 10.30 pm. The first two series were presented by Olivia O'Leary; however, John Bowman took over as chairperson for all subsequent series.

Broadcast on RTÉ One, the show typically featured politicians from large political parties as well as public figures who answered questions put to them by the audience. The final edition aired on 29 June 2009. Director-General of RTÉ Cathal Goan described the programme as an "integral part of the national conversation for over 20 years". It was replaced by The Frontline, a series hosted by Pat Kenny.

== Format ==
The programme, was launched in the late 1980s. Each week the chairperson initiates a discussion between several prominent politicians and commentators. The discussion is led by questions asked by members of the audience. The first question will usually deal with the major political issue of the week. The final question is often a trivial or comic question.

Questions and Answers was usually broadcast from the RTÉ television complex in Donnybrook, Dublin with only occasional broadcasts from around Ireland.

It was broadcast at 22:30, although one edition which was broadcast at 21:30 drew comment from Declan Lynch in the Irish Independent who wondered if it was "a gesture to the poor ould fellas who might have some chance of staying awake past the first question".

For its first decade the programme was taped for broadcast from approximately 19:00 on the night of transmission. From the late 1990s, however, the programme was broadcast live, with phoned-in or emailed-in comments from viewers read out on air.

== Presenters ==
- Olivia O'Leary (1986–88)
- John Bowman (1988–2009)
- Vincent Browne (Guest Presenter)

== History ==
=== Lenihan Tape Affair: 1990 ===
The programme has occasionally set the national news agenda. During a broadcast in 1990 the then Tánaiste and expected next President of Ireland, Brian Lenihan, badly damaged his chances of being elected. He denied involvement in an effort eight years earlier in January 1982 to pressurise the then President to refuse a parliamentary dissolution – contradicting previous statement he had made.

Lenihan had actually confirmed his involvement in the effort some months earlier in an on-the-record interview with a journalist Jim Duffy, as he had to numerous political colleagues privately over eight years. During the presidential election campaign he changed his story, first in an Irish Press interview, and then on Questions and Answers. Some journalists had been told by Lenihan previously of his role in pressurising Hillery, but had been told it in an 'off the record' conversation and so could not reveal it (though one did hint it in an unsigned editorial in the Irish Independent during the crisis following the programme).

However following the programme, Duffy, in a backlash to pressure from Lenihan's Fianna Fáil not to reveal the information, did reveal that Lenihan's account on the programme conflicted with his pre-campaign version. The minor party in Charles Haughey's government, the Progressive Democrats, threatened to quit government and cause a general election unless either Lenihan was sacked from cabinet or an inquiry was ordered into the events of January 1982. When Lenihan refused to resign, Haughey, instead of ordering an inquiry into who had made the calls in 1982, sacked him.

The "ill-fated appearance" was remembered in the final episode of Questions and Answers in 2009.

=== Doherty on McCabe death: 1996 ===
Sinn Féin's Pat Doherty also used the show in 1996 to deny the involvement of the Provisional IRA in the death of Jerry McCabe. Members of that group were later convicted of manslaughter and Sinn Féin have campaigned for their early release in conjunction with the Belfast Agreement.

Doherty's refusal to condemn the murder was remembered in the final episode of Questions and Answers in 2009.

=== McLaughlin and Michael McDowell on Jean McConville killing: 2005 ===
In 2005, Sinn Féin chairman Mitchel McLaughlin told viewers that though it had been wrong for the Provisional IRA to kill Jean McConville, a widowed mother of ten young children kidnapped, shot and secretly buried, the action was not a "crime". In the aftermath of his comments, he was subjected to extreme criticism from within the Irish government, from all the main parties in Dáil Éireann, the media and by the public on radio shows.

Labour Party leader Pat Rabbitte, in a press release immediately afterwards commented that "Any civilised society must consider the abduction and murder of a mother of 10 children to be a crime of considerable barbarism" while Mrs McConville's son Michael said that McLaughlin, along with Sinn Féin TD Arthur Morgan, who had made similar comments elsewhere, "should be holding their heads in shame".

McLaughlin's refusal to call the murder a crime was remembered in the final episode of Questions and Answers in 2009.

=== Michael O'Brien vs. Noel Dempsey: 2009 ===
In one of the last episodes, former mayor of Clonmel and Fianna Fáil member, Michael O'Brien confronted Minister for Transport Noel Dempsey about the way the Commission to Inquire into Child Abuse had treated survivors of the industrial schools, pointing out that the allegedly non-adversarial process had involved him being accused of lying. He said the government should change the constitution so that the assets of the religious orders who ran the industrial schools could be frozen. He also spoke of how he still suffered nightmares about the abuse he suffered in Ferryhouse and how his experience of the questioning had led him to contemplate suicide but his wife had persuaded him not to do it. He ended his remarks by saying "You know me minister" to Noel Dempsey to which Dempsey nodded in silence. Presenter John Bowman in the final show just weeks later said that interruption was "by far the most memorable moment" in the history of Questions and Answers.

== Final episode ==
The final episode was broadcast on 29 June 2009. It featured an interview with Taoiseach Brian Cowen plus three separate panels filled with senior politicians. The first panel featured Minister for Health Mary Harney, Fine Gael leader Enda Kenny, Labour spokesman on justice Pat Rabbitte, tax lawyer Suzanne Kelly, and Senator David Norris. The second panel featured The Irish Times columnist and writer John Waters, former Progressive Democrats minister Liz O'Donnell, Fergus Finlay, former chef-de-cabinet of the Irish Labour Party and current chief executive of Barnardos, solicitor Catherine Ghent, and vice-president of Sinn Féin Mary Lou McDonald. The third panel featured Noel Whelan, barrister with political background, Eddie Hobbs financial advisor with political future, Green party leader and Minister for the Environment John Gormley, MEP Mairéad McGuinness, editor of the Irish Daily Star Ger Colleran.

John Boland, writing in the Irish Independent, described the final episode as "genuinely engrossing", saying that "reminiscence rather than recrimination won through". He described the overall programme as a "weird combination of the unmissable and the frequently unwatchable".

=== Demise ===
The final Questions and Answers aired on 29 June 2009. The decision was taken when the presenter, John Bowman stepped aside. It would be replaced by a similar programme, The Frontline said to involve public participation and to run in the same time slot on a Monday night. Some politicians were said to have welcomed the show's demise, saying it was "well past its sell-by date". One government Minister told the Evening Herald newspaper: "Government and opposition parties were finding it more and more difficult to get people to go on a show that was late at night and at the start of the week to debate topics which had been trashed to death on every other show over the weekend." Prime Time presenter Miriam O'Callaghan was speculated upon as a replacement but insisted she knew nothing of the show's departure until she read about it on the RTÉ website.
