= Justine McCarthy =

Irish journalist and broadcaster

- Born: Bandon, Co Cork
- Occupations: Writer, broadcaster, journalist
- Writing career
- Genre: Non-fiction
- Subjects: Culture, politics
- Notable works: Mary McAleese: The Outsider; Deep Deception: Ireland's Swimming Scandals; An Eye on Ireland: New and Selected Journalism

Justine McCarthy is an Irish journalist, author and a columnist with The Irish Times. A commentator on politics and culture, she has been an adjunct professor of Journalism at the University of Limerick. She often appeared on Tonight with Vincent Browne.

She is the author of Mary McAleese: The Outsider, about the eighth President of Ireland; Deep Deception: Ireland's Swimming Scandals, praised by Pat Kenny and Joe Duffy and described by Fintan O'Toole as "the best of the large crop of books by Irish journalists this year, it grows beyond its immediate subject to become a terrifying anatomy of the capacity for denial and vilification within any enclosed world". and An Eye on Ireland; New and Selected Journalism published by Hachette in 2023.

In October 2010, Kevin Myers criticised McCarthy for an article she wrote concerning John Waters, describing it as "the very quintessence of the feminist narrative". In August 2011, David Quinn, founder of the Iona Institute, a socially conservative organisation that advocates the advancement and promotion of the Christian religion and what it sees as the religion's social and moral values, objected to McCarthy's Sunday Time's column critiquing his conservative agenda.

McCarthy has won more than a dozen national Journalism Awards, including the 2012, 2022 and 2023 NNI Journalism Awards honour in category Columnist of the Year.
