= Michael Clifford (journalist) =

Irish author and investigative journalist

- Education: Presentation Brothers College, Cork
- Occupations: Author, Investigative Journalist
- Employer: Irish Examiner
- Notable work: "A Force for Justice: The Maurice McCabe Story" (2018)
- Awards: Journalist of the Year (2016)

Michael "Mick" Clifford is an Irish author and investigative journalist currently working as a special correspondent with the Irish Examiner.

== Career ==
Clifford attended Presentation Brothers College, Cork for the final two years of his schooling.

He is a regular interviewer and interviewee on Irish television and radio. When Vincent Browne retired from his popular current affairs television programme in 2017, Clifford was tipped as one of his most likely successors. He has also stood in for Eamon Dunphy on the latter's podcast The Stand, having previously been a regular guest. In 2018, he called for an investigation into the Irish Prison Service, having claimed that "a serving prison officer has made certain claims in a sworn affidavit to the Justice Minister Charles Flanagan about methods used to stem the suspected flow of drugs and mobile phones into prisons – by prisoners and prison officers".

Clifford has written four books; the non-fiction Bertie Ahern and the Drumcondra Mafia (2012, with Shane Coleman), A Force for Justice: The Maurice McCabe Story (2018), and two crime novels; Ghost Town was published in 2012. He lives in Dublin.

He was awarded the title "Journalist of the Year" in 2016, having won acclaim for his work in exposing the smear campaign against Irish police whistleblower Maurice McCabe by senior members of the Garda Síochána. In 2014, TV3's Tonight with Vincent Browne named him "Journalist of the Year" for his work on the McCabe story.
