= The Light (newspaper) =

British conspiracy theory newspaper

- June 14, 2026 issue of The Light
- Founded: 27 September 2020; 6 years ago
- Language: English
- Website: thelightpaper.co.uk
- Free online archives: Yes

The Light is a monthly British, far-right and conspiratorial newspaper founded by flat earther Darren Scott Nesbitt (frequently under the pseudonym Darren Smith) on 27 September 2020. The publication was initially known for claiming the COVID-19 pandemic was a hoax, but has since endorsed articles by Holocaust deniers and Neo-Nazi authors. The paper has a sister publication, named The Irish Light, which was launched in Ireland by Gemma O'Doherty and John Waters. The Light also has affiliated publications in Canada and Australia.

The paper has been criticised for spreading COVID-19 misinformation and endorsing antisemitic conspiracy theories including Holocaust denial, as well as making death threats against journalists and health professionals. It regularly prints articles written by conspiracy theorist Vernon Coleman, and according to a review from Harvard Kennedy School "includes content that is aimed at prompting participation and activism amongst adherents of conspiracy theories, rather than simply presenting information". The paper has called for a "second Nuremberg Trial" and executions of journalists, politicians and doctors, leading it to being described by Dave Renton as a "far-right propaganda sheet", whilst other investigative groups have described it as containing "extremist propaganda".

Although the company behind the paper was dissolved on 15 February 2021, the BBC reported in June 2023 that at least 100,000 copies of The Light were being printed each month and that the publication had more than 18,000 followers on the social media site Telegram.

== Claims ==
The print publication regularly makes conspiratorial claims surrounding Bill Gates and world leaders, promotes climate change denial and claims vaccines are weaponized mind control devices. It has called for modern-day Nuremberg trials for journalists, politicians and doctors and repeatedly referenced conspiracy theories concerning Agenda 21 and the Great Reset. It regularly criticised the COVID-19 restrictions in the United Kingdom by comparing vaccination efforts to Nazi extermination camps. The paper was also found to have spread false claims concerning vaccines, COVID-19 and COVID-19 death figures.

In September 2022, The Light shared an article written by Paul Joseph Watson claiming that Lyudmyla Denisova, the former Ombudsman for Human Rights in Ukraine, had admitted to lying about the Russian military committing rape crimes in Ukraine. The disinformation analysis group Logically found that Denisova had only accepted her use of inappropriate language in describing the rape crimes, but had not admitted to lying about said crimes.

In November 2022, The Irish Light ran a headline with the phrase 'Died Suddenly' connected to marketing efforts around the release of an independent anti-vaccine film of the same name. In this issue, the paper used the images of 42 deceased individuals, claiming they had died due to being vaccinated. Upon investigation, none of the deaths were found to be due to vaccines but were caused by drowning, long-term illness, car accidents, meningitis and other events. The misuse of the names and images of the deceased individuals being used to promote anti-vaccine conspiracy theories caused severe distress among family members of the bereaved and an increase in online abuse.

== Far-right links ==
The paper has been criticised by the anti-racist group Hope not Hate for its support of the far-right. It has printed articles by Holocaust deniers John Hamer, David Icke, Professor Anthony Hall and Nesta Helen Webster, and has recommended books by white supremacist Eustace Mullins as a "renowned author", along with featuring articles by pseudonymous blogger Lasha Darkmoon who "suggested that people had been brainwashed against questioning the Holocaust". It also defended radio host Graham Hart, who was sentenced to 32 months imprisonment after making anti-Semitic remarks on his radio show in which he characterized Jewish people as "filth" and "rats" who "deserve to be wiped out". The paper also regularly references Cultural Marxism conspiracy theory, which has similar roots in anti-Semitism and has also promoted the neo-Nazi propaganda film Europa: The Last Battle on its Telegram channel.

It has also printed interviews with anti-Islam party politician Anne Marie Waters, media figure Katie Hopkins and printed articles co-authored by the English Democrats chair Robin Tilbrook and Heritage Party leader David Kurten, along with promoting material by Mark Collett, the neo-Nazi leader of the fascist group Patriotic Alternative. According to its founder, he is in communication with the editor of the German far-right conspiracy theory publication Demokratischer Widerstand (Democratic Resistance), which has stated that it is a "partner" newspaper of The Light. Demokratischer Widerstand has been linked to the Reichsbürger movement, the group behind the 2022 failed coup attempt in Germany. The paper regularly promotes the political ideologies of far-right figures such as the former English Defence League leader Tommy Robinson, Italy’s post-fascist leader Giorgia Meloni and Hungary’s autocratic ruler, Viktor Orbán.

== Distribution and criticism ==
The paper is purchased via private Facebook groups and Twitter contacts and then distributed by volunteers who are instructed to airdrop copies through letterboxes or abandon the paper in public spaces. Local leaders have accused the publication of "inflaming division and harassment with false and misleading claims about vaccines, the financial system and climate change". Its distributors have also been criticised for deliberately targeting and threatening councillors, teenagers and children.

After copies of the paper were distributed in Stroud, residents protested against the paper, stating that "we are alarmed by The Light's use of the pandemic to push support for antisemitism, Holocaust denial and racist hate speech - as well as for denial of climate change, NHS-bashing, and other reactionary views." Siobhan Baillie, the MP for Stroud, called anti-vaccine misinformation "dangerous, damaging and disrespectful" and later raised concerns in Parliament, stating: "Will the secretary of state assist me in to reassure Stroud about the vaccines and encourage people not to share Covid information from unofficial sources to stop this dangerous, damaging and disrespectful behaviour."

Simon Fell, the MP for Barrow and Furness, said of the paper: "This is a 'paper' set up by a conspiracy theorist who makes a pretty penny from selling t-shirts about global conspiracies. The only advice I can give people is to wash their hands after popping it in the recycling bin. Last time I looked there was no shortage of toilet roll anymore and people had stopped stockpiling. Consequently I can't imagine the demand for this will be high." Neil O'Brien, MP for Harborough has also criticised the paper. After being distributed in Barrow-in-Furness, Cumbria's Director of Public Health levied a similar criticism against its contents.
