= Jim Power (economist) =

Irish economist

- Other names: Jim Powers
- Occupation: Economist
- Employer: Self
- Television: Prime Time; Tonight with Vincent Browne
- Board member of: Agri-Aware, a food awareness body; Chairperson of Love Irish Food

Jim Power is a self-employed economist and podcaster, previously Chief Economist at Friends First, a subsidiary of insurance multinational Achmea. From Waterford, Ireland, he is married and has children.

Power attended University College Dublin (UCD). He has worked for the Bank of Ireland as its Chief Economist, and for Allied Irish Banks as its Treasury Economist. He teaches at Dublin City University and at UCD's Michael Smurfit Graduate Business School.

His weekly column features in the Irish Examiner, and he is often to be seen commentating in Ireland's media, in newspapers, on radio, and on television programmes such as the now defunct Tonight with Vincent Browne. He also edits Friends First's Quarterly Economic Outlook.

In April 2007, Power appeared on Prime Time where he vehemently opposed UCD Professor of Economics Morgan Kelly's warning that Ireland was heading for economic disaster. Power repeatedly insisted that the Irish property bubble would become "more sustainable in the long term", that it would not burst, and that "the reality is that those things [soaring interest rates, employment shortage, a lot of foreign multinationals leaving the country] are unlikely to happen". Within months it had.

Power later took to writing about the financial crisis. His first book, Picking Up the Pieces, appeared in 2009. Dublin Central TD Paschal Donohoe said it was a "humane thought provoking book."

Since February 2021 he has been hosting his own podcast The Other Hand with fellow economist Chris Johns.
