= Europa: The Last Battle =

2017 neo-Nazi propaganda film

- Promotional poster
- Directed by: Tobias Bratt
- Written by: Tobias Bratt
- Produced by: Tobias Bratt
- Edited by: Tobias Bratt
- Release date: 2017
- Running time: 12 hours
- Country: Sweden
- Language: English

Europa: The Last Battle is a 2017 English-language Swedish ten-part neo-Nazi propaganda film created by Tobias Bratt, a Swedish far-right activist associated with the Nordic Resistance Movement, a European neo-Nazi movement. It promotes antisemitic conspiracy theories, many in relation to World War II including Holocaust denial. The film has been promoted on multiple social media platforms by individual users, particularly white nationalists and conspiracy theorists.

== Narrative ==
Europa: The Last Battle promotes various antisemitic conspiracy theories, claiming that Karl Marx was part of a centuries-long plan by Jews to spread communism and take over the world and that Jews control the world's money supply and are conspiring to engineer the downfall of the white "Aryan" race by encouraging immigration and interracial relationships. It includes out-of-context quotes from Marx and Moses Hess's book Rome and Jerusalem to promote the idea that Jews are behind the evils of the world, and claims that Soviet leader Joseph Stalin supposedly having Jewish wives proves that Jews were controlling him.

The film also engages in historical revisionism to claim that Jews started World War I and II as part of a plot to establish Israel by provoking the Nazis into acting in self-defence. It also claims that Jews caused Germany's defeat in World War I, which is commonly referred to as the stab-in-the-back myth, and that Adolf Hitler was fighting against a global Jewish plot.

== Reception ==
Gregory Davis, a researcher at the United Kingdom-based anti-racism group Hope not Hate, said the film "denies the proven reality of the Holocaust whilst providing justifications for the violent antisemitism that fuelled it. Its mix of blatant falsehoods and slanted portrayal of real events gives it no historical legitimacy whatsoever, and it serves only to demonise the Jewish people and whitewash the crimes of the Nazi regime."

== Promotion ==
The film has been promoted by white supremacists and antisemitic conspiracy theorists, the British conspiracy newspaper The Light and QAnon conspiracy theorists on Telegram. It has also been shared on platforms such as Instagram, BitChute, Rumble, TikTok and the Telegram chat of Disclose.tv, a German disinformation outlet with a following that includes Holocaust deniers and neo-Nazis. YouTube and Facebook have blocked the film from being uploaded, but links to the film on other sites can be shared.
