= Michael Smurfit Graduate Business School =

Postgraduate division of University College Dublin, in Blackrock, Dublin

Coordinates: 53.2958°N 6.1846°W

- University College Dublin
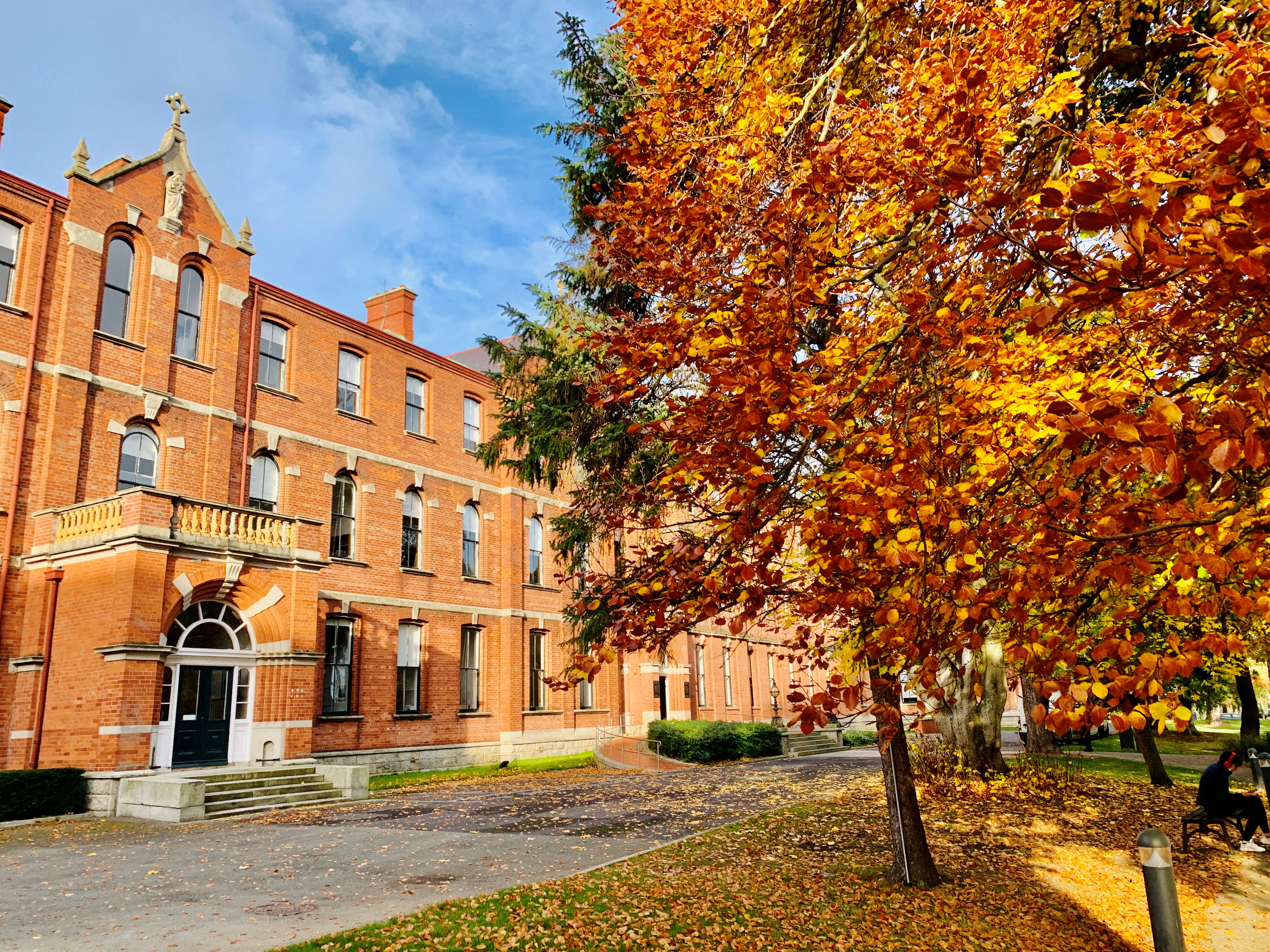
- Motto: Ad Astra
- Motto in English: To the Stars
- Established: 1908
- Named for: Michael Smurfit
- Architectural style: Victorian
- Dean: Anthony Brabazon
- Website: https://www.smurfitschool.ie/

The Michael Smurfit Graduate Business School is the graduate business school of the University College Dublin (UCD) and is located in Blackrock, Dublin, Ireland, on the site of the former teacher-training Carysfort College. Undergraduate business education is provided by the Quinn School of Business on USD's main Belfield campus.

It originates from the UCD Faculty of Commerce, founded in 1908. UCD's Michael Smurfit Graduate Business School is ranked 24th in the Financial Times' ranking of leading European Business Schools in 2023. The business school's Masters in International Management is ranked 3rd in the world.

== History ==
In 1964 UCD became one of the first European universities to offer a Master of Business Administration (MBA). In 1991, the Graduate School of Business moved to the dedicated campus at Blackrock. The school is built upon an extraordinary leadership gift from Dr Michael WJ Smurfit.

== Memberships ==
The Smurfit School is a member institution of the Association to Advance Collegiate Schools of Business International (AACSB), the European Quality Improvement System (EQUIS), the quality improvement system administered by the European Foundation for Management Development, and the Association of MBAs. The school is also a member of the Global Alliance in Management Education, an alliance of 26 academic institutions and over 50 leading multinational corporations.

== Rankings ==
In 2018 the Financial Times ranked the school as the best business school in Ireland and 23rd in the top 100 business schools in Europe. The Economist Intelligence Unit ranked the full-time MBA programme 63rd in the world in 2014. The Financial Times ranked the school 89th in the world's top 100 full-time MBA programs (2018), while it ranked the Smurfit School's executive MBA programme 94th in the world (2014) and 41st in Europe (2015). Smurfit is the only Irish institute that has made into the top 100 in the Financial Times rankings. The business school's Masters in International Management is ranked eighth in the world.

== People ==
=== Benefactors ===
- Michael Smurfit – business executive
- Denis O'Brien – business executive

=== Teachers and Professors ===
- Conor Brady – newspaper editor
- Brian Hillery – politician
- Jim Power – economist

=== Alumni ===
- Michael Beary – Irish Army general and former UNIFIL commander
- Sarah Carey – columnist and broadcaster
- Ciarán Hope – Fulbright Scholar and composer of orchestral, choral, and film music
- Conor McNamara – sports commentator
- Derval O'Rourke – athlete
- Nóirín O'Sullivan – Garda Commissioner
- Julie-Ann Russell – footballer
- Eóin Tennyson – Alliance Party MLA for Upper Bann

=== Board members/Advisors ===
- Kathleen Murphy – lawyer and business executive
- Margaret Brennan – CBS News correspondent
- Phillip Matthews – director
