= Julien Mercille =

Irish news analyst and academic

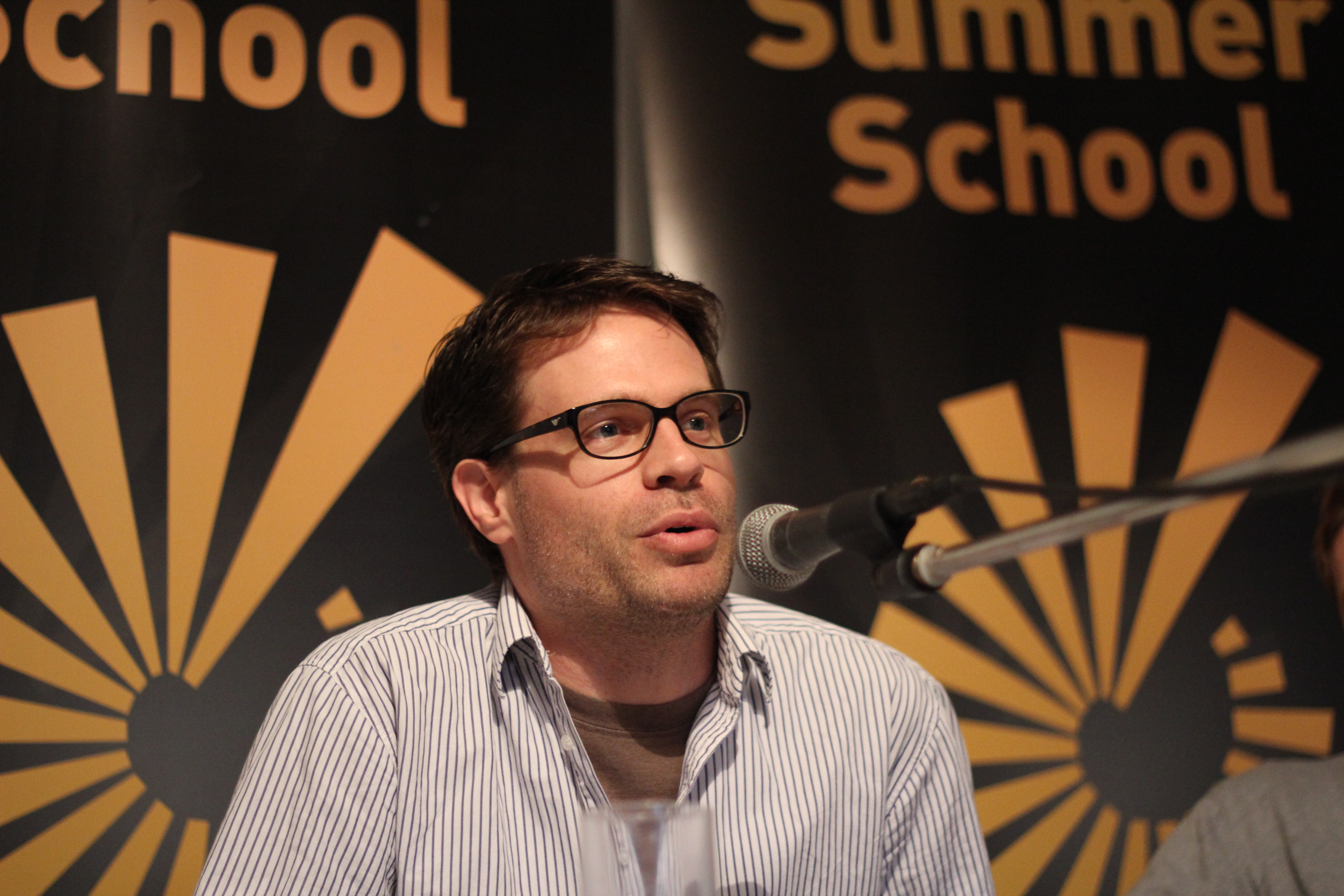
Julien Mercille in 2013

Julien Mercille is an academic at University College Dublin's School of Geography, Planning & Environmental Policy. He has contributed articles to the Irish national media on platforms RTÉ, Newstalk and TV3 (on Tonight with Vincent Browne).

== Early life and education ==
Mercille received his PhD from the University of California, Los Angeles in 2007. Before this he received his MA from the University of Kentucky and he also studied at McGill University in Montreal, Quebec, Canada.

== Career ==
Mercille researches and writes about the role of the media in Ireland and elsewhere, and in particular political economy. His articles have been critical of the media's focus on the feelings of politicians, while ignoring the feelings of ordinary citizens. His controversial paper, The Role Of The Media In Propping Up Ireland's Housing Bubble, was heavily discussed in the press. After Paul Murphy TD appeared on The Late Late Show, Mercille wrote a critical analysis of interviewer Ryan Tubridy and of Marc Coleman, former economics editor at The Irish Times.

Mercille is the writer of The Political Economy and Media Coverage of the European Economic Crisis: The Case of Ireland. He has also addressed the Cleraun Media Conference, an important forum where ethical and professional issues are discussed.

His other interests include global politics and the "war on drugs".
