= Sarah Carey =

Irish columnist and broadcaster

- Born: 1969 (age 56–57)
- Citizenship: Irish
- Education: Trinity College Dublin; University College Dublin
- Occupations: Columnist, broadcaster, communications consultant
- Children: 3

Sarah Carey (born 1969) is an Irish columnist, broadcaster and communications consultant. She writes for the Irish Independent. From March 2011 until August 2017 she presented Talking Point on Newstalk. She is a former columnist for The Sunday Times,The Herald and The Irish Times.

== Education and career ==
Carey has a degree in history from Trinity College Dublin, and a post-graduate diploma in Business Studies from the Michael Smurfit Graduate Business School in University College Dublin (U.C.D.). She has worked as a communications consultant for many companies, particularly in public affairs and infrastructure. Carey is also a professional chair and facilitator of conferences and workshops. She worked for Esat Digifone. and has also worked in the technology industry including Cape Clear and search engine Cuil. Carey was appointed by the Department of the Environment to the Appeals Board of the Register of Architects and Chartered Surveyors, serving two terms from 2013 to 2019.

== Blog and early writing ==
In 2002 she began writing the blog GUBU, "An Irish woman's social, political and domestic commentary". Then, after reading the blog, Sunday Times Irish Editor Fiona McHugh offered Carey a column. The Sunday Times column ended when she started writing a weekly opinion column for The Irish Times in 2008. The blog also ended in 2008. Carey revealed that in her time at The Sunday Times, opinion columnists had been forbidden from expressing views in favour of the Lisbon Treaty.

== Moriarty Tribunal ==
=== Witness ===
Because she had worked as Marketing Coordinator for Esat Telecom, she was a witness at the Moriarty Tribunal. In 2004 she leaked information provided to her by the tribunal about political donations made by Denis O'Brien to political parties in Ireland. The information included a letter of thanks to O'Brien from Michael McDowell of the Progressive Democrats. These leaks were published by journalist Stephen Collins in The Sunday Tribune. She denied to her legal team that she had been the source of the leak. When told she would be questioned under oath, she admitted she was the source. Carey said "her motives were political" as the Tribunal had only highlighted O'Brien's donations to Fine Gael, and not those to other parties. The Tribunal judge publicly rebuked her in 2004 for wasting the tribunal's time in identifying the source of the leak.

=== Moriarty Tribunal report and aftermath ===
When the final Tribunal report was published in March 2011, she appeared on Prime Time, a national TV news analysis show, in which she defended the leak and her support for Mr O'Brien. Days later, she resigned from her job with The Irish Times. In a statement, the editor, Geraldine Kennedy, a former Teachta Dála and Progressive Democrat colleague of Michael McDowell's, said that "her credibility as a columnist had been damaged by the findings of the report of the Moriarty tribunal and its aftermath." She continues to write for other newspapers. and appears regularly on RTE television and radio programmes.

== Personal life ==
Carey lives in County Meath and is married with three children. Her father William Carey was a Fine Gael councillor for 47 years on Meath County Council.
