= John Waters (columnist) =

Irish columnist and author (born 1955)

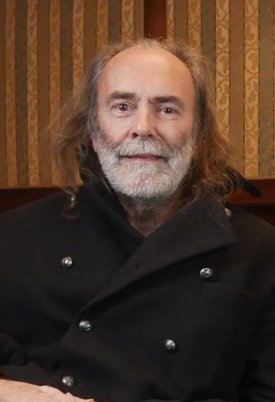
- Waters in 2019
- Born: John Augustine Waters; 28 May 1955 (age 71); Castlerea, County Roscommon, Ireland
- Occupations: Columnist, author
- Years active: 1981–present
- Known for: Writing in The Irish Times, entering the Eurovision Song Contest
- Political party: Independent
- Spouse: Rita Simons (m. 2014)
- Children: 1
- Website: johnwaters.ie

John Augustine Waters (born 28 May 1955) is a far-right Irish columnist, political candidate, journalist and author. He started his career with the music and politics magazine Hot Press, and the Sunday Tribune newspaper. He later edited the social magazine In Dublin and the investigative and current affairs magazine Magill. He became a regular columnist at The Irish Times and Irish Independent, while authoring some non-fiction works, and developed The Whoseday Book which raised 3 million euros for charity. He has also been a member of the Broadcasting Authority of Ireland.

Waters was an unsuccessful independent candidate in the 2020 Irish general election (to elect the 33rd Dáil) for the Dún Laoghaire constituency. He was also an unsuccessful candidate for the Midlands–North-West constituency at the 2024 European Parliament election.

== Career ==
=== Early career ===
Waters's career began in 1981 with the Irish politics and music magazine Hot Press. He wrote for the Sunday Tribune and later edited In Dublin magazine from 1985 to 1987 and Magill.

Waters has written several books and, in 1998, he devised The Whoseday Book — which contains quotes, writings and pictures of 365 Irish writers and musicians – raising €3 million for the Irish Hospice Foundation.

=== Irish Times and Irish Independent ===
Waters wrote a weekly column for The Irish Times from 1990 to 2014. He was briefly fired during a dispute with the then editor, Geraldine Kennedy, but was shortly thereafter reinstated.

In March 2014, Waters left The Irish Times, and shortly after started writing columns for the Sunday Independent and Irish Independent.On 13 July 2014 the Sunday Independent published what it described as Waters' first column for the paper. He has since written regular columns for that paper and its sister the Irish Independent. In 2018 he released a new book called Give Us Back the Bad Roads.

=== Other work ===
Waters is a fortnightly contributor to the American journal First Things and is a Permanent Research Fellow at the Center for Ethics and Culture, University of Notre Dame.

In August 2021, John Waters and Gemma O'Doherty launched a freesheet newspaper titled The Irish Light, largely consisting of anti-vaccine propaganda and other conspiracy theories. It is run in conjunction with The Light, a UK publication, and reprints much of the UK version's articles.

== Politics and advocacy ==
Waters was an active participant in the Catholic cultural movement Communion and Liberation. He has given at least one talk to the Iona Institute, a Dublin-based socially conservative organisation that advocates the advancement and promotion of the Christian religion and what it sees as the religion's social and moral values.

He was a member of the Broadcasting Authority of Ireland until he resigned in January 2014, during which time he was a litigant seeking damages from the broadcaster RTÉ.

In 2015, he became involved with First Families First in calling for a 'No' vote in the referendum for the Thirty-fourth Amendment of the Constitution (Marriage Equality) Bill 2015.

In February 2018 he appeared with Nigel Farage at an Irexit conference organised by Hermann Kelly. The conference described itself as open "only to supporters of an Irish exit from the European Union". There were several members of the far-right National Party - headed by Justin Barrett - at the conference. Waters denied that Ireland was a republic, state or democracy. Waters was quoted as saying "We have to remove the media because they don’t permit us to have the conversation" to which the crowd responded enthusiastically. They also applauded his claim that immigrants "have no affinity or allegiance to the countries they end up in" and that "[t]his is our fault because we don’t demand it". He claimed that "Europeans no longer have a place to call home" and that European Christianity was being eroded by "metastatic cancer".

In 2019 he appeared in a number of podcasts with Gemma O'Doherty and Justin Barrett.

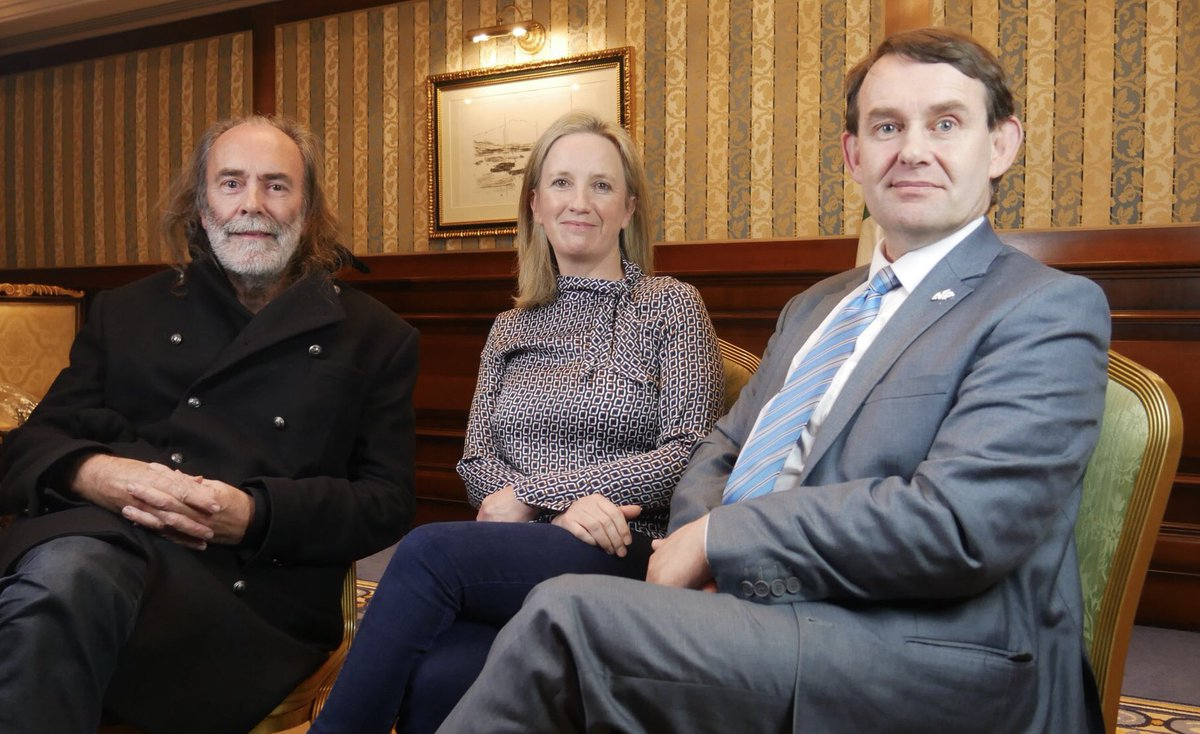
Waters with Gemma O'Doherty, and Justin Barrett of the National Party.

=== 2020 general election ===
==== Balbriggan meeting ====
On 28 January 2020, Waters and O'Doherty addressed an Anti-Corruption Ireland meeting in Balbriggan. During the meeting he said "many of the ethnicities that are coming here” had “fertility rates that are two or three times the Irish rate" and claimed the Great Replacement conspiracy theory of Renaud Camus would happen in Ireland. He criticised the Fianna Fáil slogan "An Ireland for all", saying in an outraged tone "Who were Fianna Fáil referring to? ISIS? There are two words missing. Except Paddy". During his speech he openly speculated about being murdered in a nursing home by an immigrant care worker.

==== Campaign and election ====
Waters ran under the banner of Gemma O'Doherty's far-right group, "Anti-Corruption Ireland", in the 2020 Irish general election, in the Dún Laoghaire constituency. In his pre-election writings he referred to the Great Replacement conspiracy theory and referred to The Strange Death of Europe. As Anti-Corruption Ireland is not a registered political party, he appeared on the ballot paper as an independent. Waters received 1.48% of first preference votes and was eliminated on the first count.

=== High Court action against COVID-19 legislation ===
On 15 April 2020, Waters and Gemma O'Doherty launched a legal action against laws dealing with the COVID-19 pandemic. They sought to have various parts of the legislation declared null and void by a judge of the High Court.

The legislation included:

- Health (Preservation and Protection and other Emergency Measures in the Public Interest) Act 2020
- Emergency Measures in the Public Interest (COVID-19) Act 2020
- The 1947 Health Act (Affected Areas) Order

as well as temporary restrictions brought in due to COVID-19 under the 1947 Health Act.

Waters said to the court that the legislation was "unconstitutional", "improperly acted" and "very flawed". He said that the challenge was brought on the grounds that the laws were brought in by a caretaker government, by a Dáil where the number of TDs were limited and was enacted by an outgoing Seanad. The action was to be taken against the Minister for Health (Ireland), Ireland and the Attorney General. In a hearing on the matter, Mr Justice Paul Sankey said that the court was only concerned with the legality of the legislation and not about government policy, directed that the application for permission to bring the challenge be made on notice to the State respondents, and adjourned the matter for a week.

In a second hearing, the Counsel for the State, told the court that the State would oppose the application for leave to bring the challenge, and stated that the Seanad and Ceann Comhairle would need to be added as notice parties. During this hearing, O'Doherty stated that the vast majority of people were unaffected by COVID-19 which she said was "no threat to life" and that Irish people should be allowed to go outside and "build up a herd immunity". During the discussion, the applicants questioned if the proceedings were being held in public. Up to 100 supporters of the applicants gathered in the Round Hall of the Four Courts but were not permitted to enter the courtroom because of social distancing rules introduced because of COVID-19. An application to let some or all of the supporters into the courtroom was dismissed by the judge, who said that the court was being held in public and was being reported on by the media. The following day, Gardaí announced that there was an investigation into the large gathering at the Four Courts, stating that they had asked the group to disperse because of concerns with adherence to guidelines on social distancing and non-essential travel. Gardaí said the group dispersed and no arrests were made but investigations were ongoing.

At the next hearing, on 28 April 2020, there was a strong Garda presence at the Four Courts, and barriers were used to prevent crowds from entering the court. Members of the Public Order Unit and the Bridewell Garda station were stationed at all main entrances to the building. About forty supporters of the applicants turned up. No arrests were made. At this hearing, Mr Justice Charles Meehan fixed the applicant's appeal for hearing on 5 May 2020. During the meeting, O'Doherty said that the people of Ireland were under "mass house arrest" and Gardaí were "using guns" to frighten people.

On 5 May 2020, there was again a strong Garda presence outside the Four Courts. In her submission to the court O'Doherty said that the COVID-19 conditions were comparable to living in "Nazi Germany" and that the basis for introducing the restrictions was "scientifically fraudulent" and that evidence to that effect would be presented at the full hearing of their action. The State's representatives opposed the application for leave, saying that the claims were not arguable.

On 13 May 2020, Mr Justice Charles Meehan dismissed the applicant's case. He said that the applicant's claims were not arguable and the court could not grant them an application to have their challenge determined at a full hearing of the High Court. He said that the applicants had not provided any facts or expert evidence to support the view that the laws challenged by the applicants were unconstitutional, and noted that the applicants had "no medical or scientific qualifications or expertise, [and] relied on their own unsubstantiated views, gave speeches, engaged in empty rhetoric and sought to draw parallel to Nazi Germany which is both absurd and offensive".

On 2 March 2021, the Irish Court of Appeal dismissed an appeal by Waters and O'Doherty of the High Court's refusal to permit them to bring their challenge, and its award of costs of that hearing against them. Counsel for the state in the appeal argued that some of the applicants' submissions were "Bermuda Triangle stuff".

On 5 July 2022 the Supreme Court upheld the decision to dismiss the challenge brought by him and Gemma O'Doherty against the constitutionality of laws introduced in response to COVID-19.

=== 2024 European Parliament election ===
He ran as an independent candidate in the 2024 European Parliament election in the constituency of Midlands–North-West. Waters received 13,692 (2.0%) first preference votes but was not elected.

== Non-fiction and drama ==
Waters has written a number of works of non-fiction as well as plays for radio and the stage. The title of his first non-fiction book, Jiving at the Crossroads, is a pun of Irish president Éamon de Valera's vision of a rural Ireland which is often misquoted as "comely maidens dancing at the crossroads". In the book, Waters comments on modern Ireland. Another non-fiction work, Lapsed Agnostic, describes his "journey from belief to un-belief and back again."

== Appearances ==
=== Eurovision Song Contest ===
Waters has entered the Eurovision Song Contest. "They Can't Stop the Spring", the song he co-wrote with Tommy Moran and performed by the band Dervish, was selected following a telephone vote of viewers on RTÉ's The Late Late Show to be Ireland's entry in Eurovision Song Contest 2007 in Helsinki. The song finished last in the European competition final, receiving only 5 points.

In 2010, RTÉ announced that Waters had sought to represent Ireland again at Eurovision, with the song "Does Heaven Need Much More?", co-written with Tommy Moran. In the Irish National Final on 5 March 2010, the song was performed by Leanne Moore, the winner of You're a Star 2008, and finished in fourth place.

=== Electric Picnic 2010 ===
Waters attended the Electric Picnic music festival in 2010 and wrote that he felt a sense of dissatisfaction with the event, concluding that there was a lack of meaning underpinning events at the festival. Sunday Tribune journalist Una Mullally replied that if Waters felt disconnected or out of place at the Electric Picnic, that it was because the country had changed, and continued "perhaps this is the first Irish generation who have purposely opted out of tormenting themselves by searching for some unattainable greater meaning and who have chosen instead just to live".

=== Television ===
In 2007, Waters took part as one of the guest amateur chefs, in the RTE The Restaurant, programme. In 2008, he took part in a television programme which researched his family's past. Parish records revealed that his great-granduncle, also called John Waters, died of starvation during the Great Famine.

In 2011 he sat for the painter Nick Miller, the subject of a naked portrait for an Arts Lives RTÉ programme, called Naked.

Over the years Waters has participated on a number of current affairs programmes on Irish television, including Questions and Answers (RTÉ), Vincent Browne Tonight (TV3), and The Late Late Show (RTÉ).

== Views ==
=== Criticism of blogosphere ===
During a newspaper review on radio station, Newstalk 106, Waters declared blogs and bloggers to be "stupid". He then repeated those claims the following week, sparking controversy amongst Irish bloggers who took exception to his views. In the same interview, Waters claimed that "sixty to seventy percent of the internet is pornography".

=== Northern Ireland ===
Of the Troubles in Northern Ireland, and the acceptance of the Good Friday Agreement by Sinn Féin, Waters has written, "After thirty years of conflict and more than 3,000 deaths, the Provos had achieved nothing more than had been on the table at the beginning. Now they were prepared to exchange all the alleged principles on which they had fought their 'war' for a few seats in an assembly that could have been agreed nearly three decades previously if they had been prepared to be reasonable. They had fought for 'freedom' and settled for power."

=== Pantigate ===
On 11 January 2014, Waters was mentioned by Irish drag queen Panti (Rory O'Neill) on RTÉ's The Saturday Night Show with Brendan O'Connor while discussing homophobia. O'Neill said that Waters, among other Irish journalists, was homophobic.

Waters and the others mentioned threatened RTÉ and O'Neill with legal action. RTÉ subsequently removed that section of the interview from their online archive. On 25 January episode of The Saturday Night Show, O'Connor issued a public apology to those named on behalf of RTÉ for being mentioned in the interview held two weeks previously. RTÉ compensated Waters and others mentioned.

RTÉ received hundreds of complaints about the issue. A rally against the payout and censorship drew 2,000 people, and the appropriateness of the payout was later discussed by members of the Oireachtas. The issue was also discussed in the European Parliament. RTÉ's head of television defended the €85,000 payout and blamed the decision mostly on Ireland's Anti-Defamation Laws.

=== Dispute with The Irish Times colleagues ===
In February 2014, Waters' implicated fellow The Irish Times journalist Patsy McGarry as the author of a handful of ad hominem Tweets, written anonymously. In the piece, Waters' alleged an institutional bias within The Irish Times against Catholic social teaching. Despite this, in March 2014, it was announced that John Waters had decided to stop contributing to The Irish Times. Reports stated that he had been unhappy at The Irish Times since the controversy.

=== Comments on depression ===
In April 2014, Waters replied when asked if he had become depressed because of the reaction to his actions over RTÉ and Rory O'Neill: "There's no such thing. It's an invention. It's bullshit. It's a cop out."

He was criticised by many, including Paul Kelly, founder of the suicide prevention charity Console, guidance councillor Eamon Keane, journalist Suzanne Harrington (whose late husband suffered from depression), gay rights activist Panti, charity campaigner Majella O'Donnell as well as online commenters.

His former partner Sinéad O'Connor expressed concern for Waters, saying that she thought he was suffering from depression and needed to admit it.

=== Faith and society ===
Waters devoted much of his column space in The Irish Times to discussing the role and importance of religion and faith in society. In an interview, he has described people of faith as "funnier, sharper and smarter" than atheists. In a 2009 article titled "Another no to Lisbon might shock FF back to its senses" Waters voiced his opposition to gay marriage stating that it was "potentially destructive of the very fabric of Irish society".

==== Thirty-fourth amendment to the Constitution of Ireland ====
In 2015 a referendum was held on the matter of same-sex marriage. Before the referendum the Constitution was assumed to contain an implicit prohibition on same-sex marriage.

Waters was involved with a group opposing the referendum called First Families First, along with Kathy Sinnott and Gerry Fahey.

After the referendum passed, Waters described the result as 'catastrophic' for Irish society. He also said "Not just the gay, LGBT lobby, but virtually the entire journalistic fraternity turned on me and tried to basically peck me to death".

In February 2017, Waters spoke at a panel where he blamed LGBT activists for his decision to quit journalism. He said "I stopped being a journalist because of the LGBT campaign. They tried to present themselves as beautiful gentle people, but these people aren't". Waters compared the activists that attacked him to the Black and Tans, saying "I would prefer them to the people I met last year in the campaign. I would prefer them, bring them back. Bring back the Black and Tans". "The ugliest phenomenon I have ever seen in 30 years a journalist," Waters added.

He also claimed that the clerical child abuse cases were "closely aligned to homosexuality". He claimed "Now paedophile priests, there's no such thing… that's the single most interesting lie about all this. 90% of the abusers in Catholic church, they were not paedophiles, they were ephebophiles. An entirely different phenomenon. They were abusers of teenage boys which is closely aligned to homosexuality".

=== Urban/rural divide ===
In Jiving at the Crossroads he wrote about what he perceived the divide between secular urban Ireland and rural areas. He felt that the former looked down on the latter. In his Hot Press radio column he had relied on stock images of rural life, but the book was an attempt to make amends.

He was influenced by John Healy, admiring his works Nineteen Acres and The Death of an Irish Town.

=== Change in audience ===
From 2014 onwards, he mostly did not write to influence mainstream public opinion. The thirty-fourth Amendment of the Constitution of Ireland recognised same sex marriage in Ireland (previously held to be prohibited by the constitution) and the thirty-sixth Amendment of the Constitution of Ireland which changed the constitutional position on abortion. He no longer wrote for a mostly Irish audience, but for one centred on the United States, becoming involved in culture wars between conservatives and progressives. He now appeared on conservative podcasts with large audiences.

=== Direct provision ===
Direct provision is a system of asylum seeker accommodation that has been criticised as illegal, inhuman and degrading.

Far right groups, as part of their xenophobic policy, had been encouraging people to oppose DP centres for some years, with little success. However, in November 2018, a proposed DP centre was firebombed in Moville. The following February, protests against a proposed DP centre in Rooskey saw another arson attack on a proposed DP centre. In September 2019, Oughterard saw the largest ever protests against a proposed DP centre, which was blockaded night and day for three weeks. Another 24/7 protest began on Achill Island the following month, which continued until 2020, the longest ever protest against a DP centre. Plans to accommodate asylum seekers in these four places were dropped. While there have been small protests against DP centres since Achill, none have been successful.

In a podcast in 2019 he claimed that direct provision was not inhumane and that asylum seekers lived in luxury compared to how he grew up.

=== Other views ===
Waters has referred to himself as a "neo-Luddite" or later as a "luddite". At one stage he refused to use e-mail and stated his concern that society ignores the negative aspects of the Internet.

In his articles titled "Impose democracy on Iraq" and "Bush and Blair doing right thing", Waters explained his support for the 2003 invasion of Iraq, a position based on his belief that Iraq posed an imminent threat to the West due to its possession of weapons of mass destruction.

He wrote an article titled "Two sides to domestic violence", which criticised the lack of gender balance in Amnesty International's campaign against domestic violence in Ireland. Waters cited the National Crime Council report, conducted by the Economic and Social Research Institute, which found approximate gender symmetry in most measures of domestic violence and he pointed out that despite these statistics, funding for women victims of domestic violence (€15 million) disproportionately outstrips funding for male victims. Waters' article led to a response from the head of Amnesty International's Irish branch.

=== Jailing over parking fine ===
In September 2013 he was jailed for around two hours in Wheatfield Prison over non-payment of a parking fine. The case dated back to 2011 and Waters claimed that he returned to his car one minute over a 15-minute grace period. He refused to pay the fine as a matter of principle.

=== Defamation action against Waters ===
In November 2018 The Irish Times journalist Kitty Holland took a defamation action against Waters for accusing her of lying about the cause of death of Savita Halappanavar. In July 2024, Holland was awarded €35,000 damages for defamation of character against Waters.

Following the verdict, Waters was ordered to pay Holland's full legal costs, estimated to be €150,000.

== Publications ==
=== Non-fiction ===
- Jiving at the Crossroads: The Shock of the New in Haughey's Ireland (Blackstaff, 1991) ISBN 978-0-85640-478-8
- Race of Angels: Ireland and the Genesis of U2 (4th Estate/Blackstaff, 1994) ISBN 978-0-85640-542-6
- Every Day Like Sunday? (Poolbeg, 1995) ISBN 978-1-85371-423-8
- An Intelligent Person's Guide to Modern Ireland (Duckworth, 1997) ISBN 978-0-7156-2791-4 New edition (2001) ISBN 978-0-7156-3091-4
- The Politburo Has Decided That You Are Unwell (Liffey Press, 2004) ISBN 978-1-904148-46-3
- Lapsed Agnostic (Continuum, 2007) ISBN 978-0-8264-9146-6
- Beyond Consolation: or How We Became Too Clever for God... and Our Own Good (Continuum, 2010) ISBN 978-1-4411-1421-1
- Feckers: 50 People Who Fecked Up Ireland (Constable, 2010) ISBN 978-1-84901-442-7
- Was it for this? Why Ireland lost the plot (Transworld Ireland, 2012) ISBN 978-1-848-27125-8
- Give Us Back the Bad Roads (Currach Press, 2018) ISBN 9781782189015

=== Plays ===
- Long Black Coat (with David Byrne) (Nick Hern Books, 1995) ISBN 978-1-85459-263-7
- Holy Secrets (on BBC Radio 4, 1996)
- Easter Dues (1997)
- Adverse Possession (on BBC Radio 3, 1998)

== Personal life ==
Waters was born on 28 May 1955 in Castlerea, County Roscommon to Thomas (1904–1989) and Mary Ita Waters (née McGrath; 1920–2012). From a relationship with singer Sinéad O'Connor, he has a daughter, born in 1996 in London. Following her birth, a long legal custody battle ensued resulting in Waters having custody of his daughter and living with her in Dalkey.

He suffered from an alcohol addiction until 1989 when he gave it up completely, a decision that he credits with transforming his life. He married Rita Simons in December 2014.

He reported on his social media pages that he suffered a minor stroke in September 2026
