= Vincent Browne =

Irish journalist

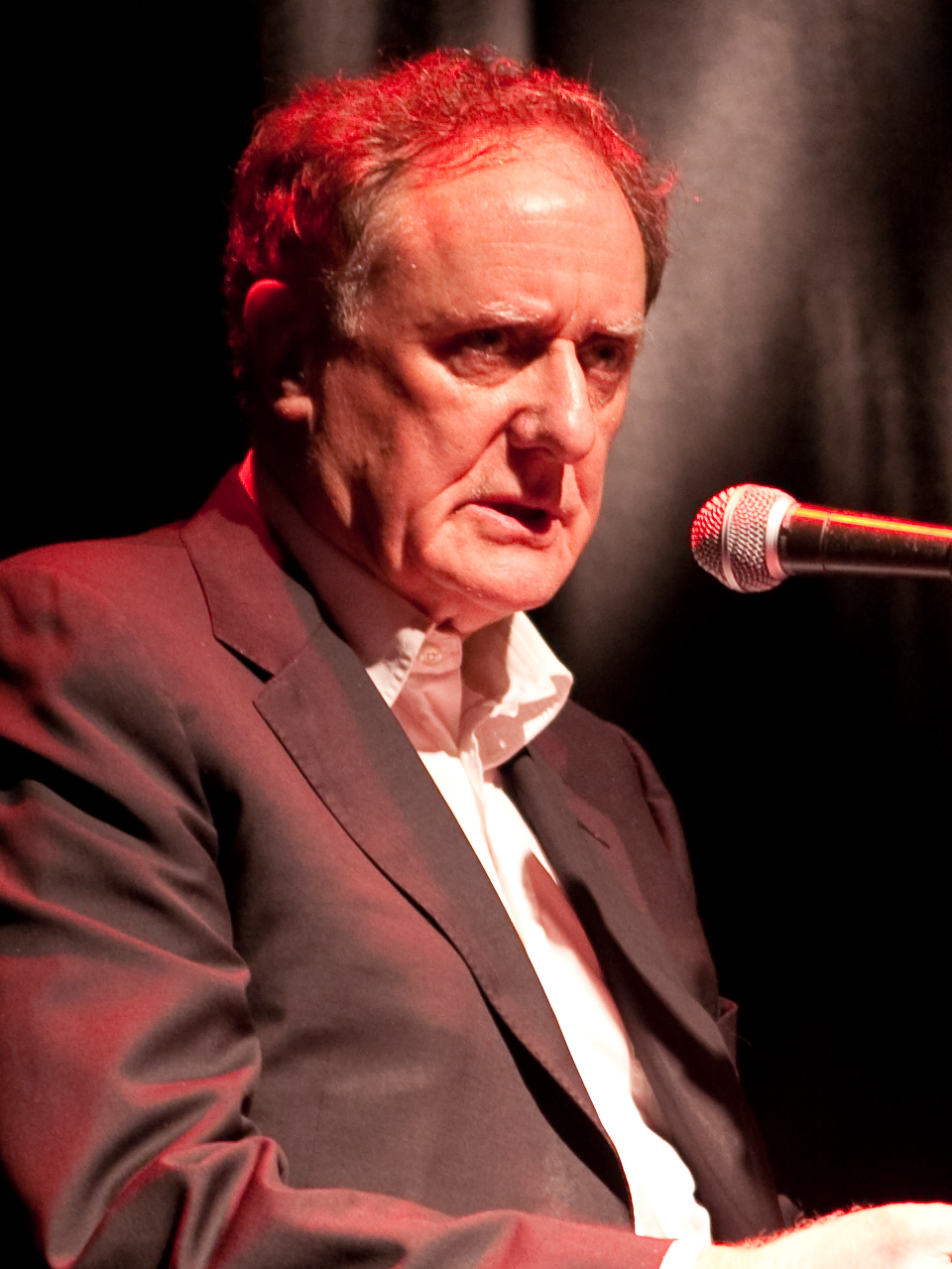
- Browne in 2011
- Born: 17 July 1944 (age 82); Broadford, County Limerick, Ireland
- Education: Castleknock College; University College Dublin
- Occupations: Broadcaster and journalist
- Employer(s): The Irish Times, The Sunday Business Post, TV3
- Known for: Presenting TV3's Tonight with Vincent Browne
- Spouse: Jean Browne
- Children: Emma; Julia

Vincent Browne (born 17 July 1944) is an Irish print and broadcast journalist. He is a columnist with The Irish Times and The Sunday Business Post and a non-practising barrister. From 1996 until 2007, he presented a nightly talk-show on RTÉ Radio, Tonight with Vincent Browne, which focused on politics, the proceedings of tribunals on political corruption and police misconduct. From 2007 to 2017 he presented Tonight with Vincent Browne on TV3, which was broadcast from Monday to Thursday at 11:00pm.

== Early life ==
Born in 1944, he grew up in Broadford, County Limerick, where he attended the local national school. He spent a year at the Irish language college, Coláiste na Rinne in An Rinn, County Waterford, then a year at queen of Angel's secondary school in Dromcolliher, County Limerick, before going to Castleknock College. He graduated from University College Dublin with a Bachelor of Arts degree in Politics and Economics. He also founded the oldest surviving UCD newspaper, the College Tribune. He also served as UCD Young Fine Gael's Chairperson.

== Career ==
He worked on RTÉ's The Late Late Show for five months in 1967–68. He reported on the Soviet and Warsaw Pact invasion of Czechoslovakia in 1968 for The Irish Times and then edited a monthly news magazine, Nusight in 1969–1970.

He was appointed Northern news editor of The Irish Press group in 1970 (working for all three newspapers in the group, The Irish Press, the Evening Press and The Sunday Press) and covered the most intense and violent period of the Northern Ireland conflict. In 1974, he joined Independent Newspapers and, after a brief period in the Evening Herald, worked for the Sunday Independent, then edited by Conor O'Brien and later by Michael Hand.

He launched Magill magazine in September 1977 with Noel Pearson and Mary Holland. Magill became Ireland's foremost investigative publication. Among its writers were Gene Kerrigan, Pat Brennan and Paddy Agnew. He remained editor of Magill until 1983, when he became involved in the relaunch of the Sunday Tribune with Tony Ryan, then of GPA and later of Ryanair. A series of articles he published in Magill highlighting the links between the Workers' Party and the Official IRA in the 1980s caused him and other journalists to receive death threats. After the publication of "The Lost Revolution: the Story of the Official IRA and the Workers' Party" it was revealed that the Official IRA had planned to assassinate him by planting a bomb on his boat, but the operation was called off at the last minute. He was editor of the Sunday Tribune until 1994. He has written a weekly column for The Irish Times since then, and since 2000, has written weekly for The Sunday Business Post. He started broadcasting on RTÉ radio in 1996.

In 1997, he relaunched Magill magazine, which had ceased publication in 1990. In the 13 issues he published then, the magazine broke several major stories. One led to the establishment of the Planning Tribunal, originally chaired by Mr Justice Fergus Flood; another caused a committee of the Oireachtas to examine the DIRT scandal; another caused an investigation of insurance "churning" by Irish Life, a leading Irish insurance company. He sold the Magill title to Hosen publisher, Mike Hogan, in November 1998. He was called to the Irish Bar in 1997 and for a while practised as a barrister. He no longer practices law.

In October 2004, he launched a current affairs magazine, Village, of which he was editor. Village ceased publication in August 2008 before being re-launched under a new editor, Michael Smith. Browne now writes a column for Village magazine.

He was involved in a controversy over the tapping of his telephone by the Irish state from February 1975 to February 1983. When this was disclosed by former minister for justice Seán Doherty, Browne sued the State. He made a settlement with the State in early 1997 which included an agreement to publish a statement on the settlement, stating, inter alia, that the State had intercepted his telephone conversations for reasons of State security – Browne had written much about the IRA in the early- to mid-1970s – while accepting that Browne had himself never been involved in subversion or crime. On being given access to the transcripts from 1981, Browne claimed that it was apparent the motivation for the interception of his telephone conversations for the eight-year period had little to do with the security of the State – it was aimed at garnering information on his work as a journalist, entirely aside from his reporting of the IRA. Browne sought to have the agreement altered to permit a public acknowledgement that the intercepts were not done for security reasons. The Fine Gael–Labour-Democratic Left coalition government refused. He subsequently disclosed this himself on television and later in print.

For ten years he presented the programme Tonight with Vincent Browne on RTÉ Radio 1. In August 2000, he substituted for John Bowman on the RTÉ television programme Questions and Answers. He also presented Prime Time on RTÉ One.

From 14 January 2007, he presented Tonight with Vincent Browne, a nightly current affairs television show on TV3 before stepping down from this role on 27 July 2017. Despite airing on what is usually considered a graveyard slot, the show was highly successful drawing up to 166,000 viewers.

In June 2012, Denis O'Brien wrote to Browne threatening to sue him. Browne disclosed this letter to the general public.

Browne later wrote a piece for The Irish Times on why O'Brien "is not a fit person to control INM [Independent News & Media]". In it he questioned O'Brien's previous threats to sue Sam Smyth and asked "[H]ow plausible is it that the removal of Sam Smyth from a Sunday morning radio programme on Today FM, which Denis O'Brien controls, and his ostracisation now within the Irish Independent to which he is contracted (not one article by him has been published for some months), isn't part of the same campaign which Denis O'Brien and [one of his then representatives on the board of INM] Leslie Buckley, conducted against Sam Smyth in 2010?"

In 2012, Browne sold his home in Dalkey for €2.6 million in order to pay off a mortgage and debts related to The Village Magazine.

In 2015, after asking were other members of the media wimps, he led a posse of journalists and camera crews into Gorse Hill, the up-market house at the centre of a legal battle.

== Politics ==
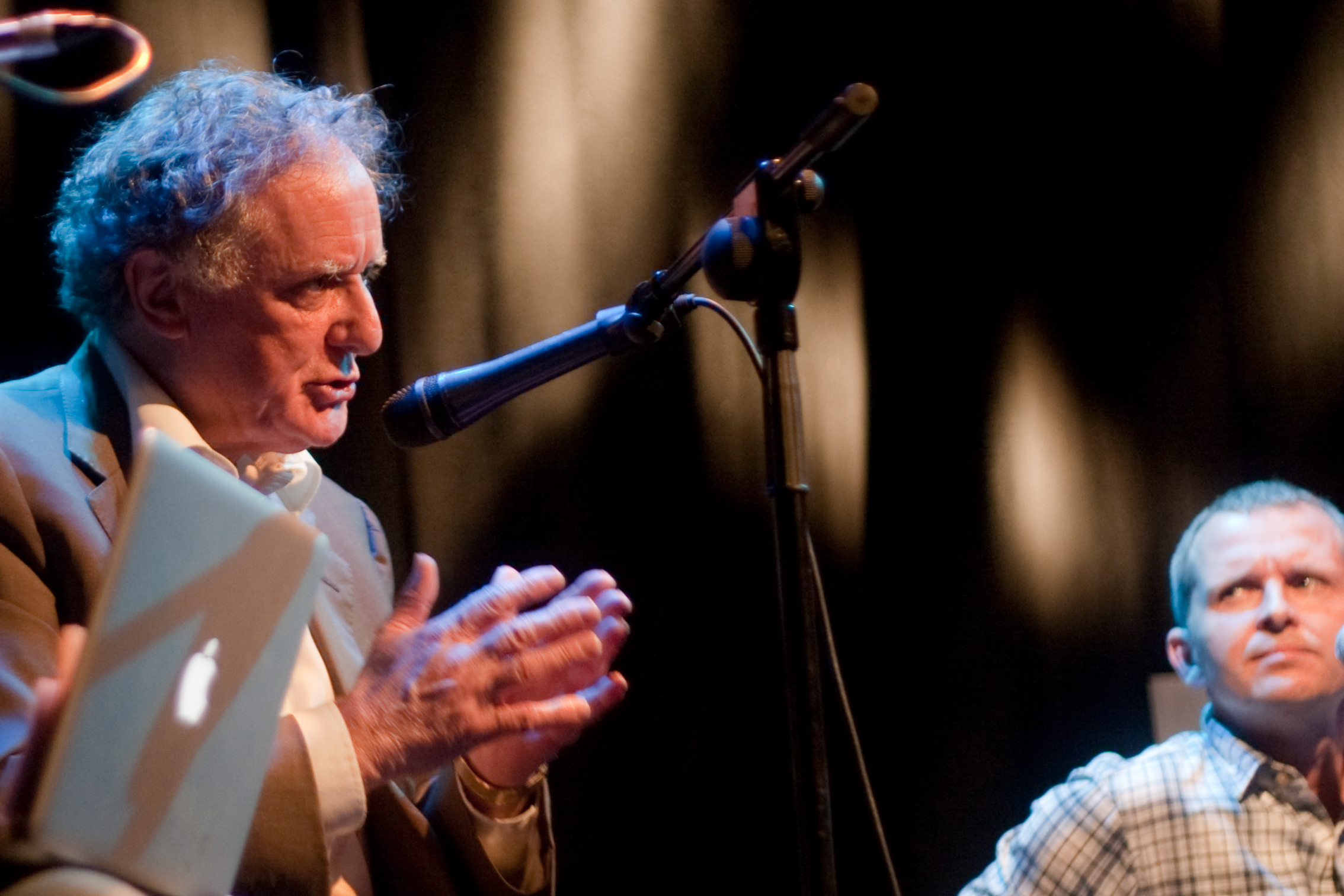
Vincent Browne speaks as Richard Boyd Barrett watches on, 2011.

In 1994, he sought a nomination for the Fine Gael party in that year's European elections or the possible general election of that year (it was thought a general election might follow the collapse of the Albert Reynolds' government). He was rebuffed by the leader of Fine Gael and future Taoiseach, John Bruton. He then became a vocal critic of the party.

A staunch critic of Fine Gael leader Enda Kenny, in 1982 Browne appeared on The Late Late Show to discuss the effectiveness of TDs where he poured scorn on Kenny, claiming he was "purporting" to be a TD. In October 2010, he was forced to make a public apology to Kenny after jokingly asking whether Fine Gael was requesting that he go into a dark room with a gun and bottle of whiskey. This was in reference to Fine Gael's position in the polls, where they were in second place to Labour, and a previous leadership challenge to Kenny by Richard Bruton. Kenny refused to appear on the leaders' debate hosted by Browne on TV3 during the 2011 general election campaign.

He voted "No" in the 2012 Irish European Fiscal Compact referendum.

In July 2003, writing of the Arms Crisis, he said "the gravest injustice was done to Albert Luykx (a member of the SS during World War II) ... who never had reason to believe that in lending money to the operation and giving otherwise of his services, he was not acting on behalf of the Irish state".

In October 2012, while presenting Tonight with Vincent Browne, he said of Israel that it "polarises the Islamic community of the world against the rest of the world" and that it had stolen land from the Arabs. Israel's deputy ambassador to Ireland concluded these to be "racist, anti-Semitic remarks". Browne in turn said he was not antisemitic, but a critic of Israel, and himself criticised "the suggestion that because you're critical of Israel, you're automatically anti-Semitic. I don't think that's acceptable". Furthermore, Browne said it was "blackmail" to try to dismiss every critic of Israel as antisemitic. The Broadcasting Authority of Ireland threw out the accusation of antisemitism, though it asked Browne to deliver an apology on TV3.

He was a wedding guest of Fine Gael senator Jerry Buttimer.

== Personal life ==
Browne is married and has two daughters. He sold his €2.6 million home in Dalkey in June 2011 to pay off debts incurred from the establishment of Village magazine, and to provide a pension. He now resides in Dún Laoghaire.
