= List of Irish Times employees =

This is a list of notable employees of The Irish Times, past and present.

== Editors ==
1. Dr. George Ferdinand Shaw (1859)
2. Rev. George Bomford Wheeler (1859–77)
3. James Scott (1877–99)
4. William Algernon Locker (1901–7)
5. John Edward Healy (1907–34)
6. R. M. "Bertie" Smyllie (1934–54)
7. Alec Newman (1954–61)
8. Alan Montgomery (1961–63)
9. Douglas Gageby (1963–74 and 1977–86)
10. Fergus Pyle (1974–77)
11. Conor Brady (1986–2002)
12. Geraldine Kennedy (2002–11)
13. Kevin O'Sullivan (2011–2017)
14. Paul O'Neill (2017–present)

== Current staff ==
=== News and current affairs, columnists ===
- Vincent Browne, columnist
- Stephen Collins, chief political correspondent
- Garret FitzGerald, columnist
- Róisín Ingle, features editor, columnist
- Karlin Lillington, technology and related business, privacy and culture
- Miriam Lord, political sketch writer
- Lara Marlowe, U.S. correspondent
- Fintan O'Toole, columnist (also serves as assistant editor)

=== Sport ===
- Philip Reid, golf correspondent

=== Critics ===
- Eileen Battersby, literary critic
- Jim Carroll, music critic
- Una Mullally
- Orla Tinsley

=== Cartoonist ===
- Martyn Turner

== Former staff ==
- Charles Acton, music critic (1956–1987)
- John Banville, sub editor and literary editor
- Maeve Binchy
- Sarah Carey, former columnist
- Myles na gCopaleen, satirical columnist
- Michael Dwyer, film critic
- Donal Foley, satirical columnist
- John Healy, political commentator
- Mary Holland, Northern Ireland correspondent
- Tom Humphries, columnist
- Seamus Martin, international editor, editor of Electronic Publications, features editor, Moscow correspondent, South Africa correspondent
- Kevin Myers, columnist
- Gerry Noone, former sports editor
- Conor O'Clery, foreign correspondent in Beijing, London, Moscow, New York City and Washington, D.C.
- Fergus Pyle, Northern Ireland editor
- Arthur Quinlan, western correspondent
- Paul Tansey, economics editor
- Terence de Vere White, literary editor
- John Waters
- Maev-Ann Wren, business features editor, economics editor, senior newspaper editor
