= Ruadhán Mac Cormaic =

- Born: 1980 or 1981 (age 44–45); Dublin, Ireland
- Education: Trinity College Dublin; University of Strasbourg; Cambridge University
- Occupations: Journalist; editor; author
- Spouse: Jean O’Mahoney
- Writing career
- Years active: 2007–present
- Genres: Non-fiction; journalism
- Notable work: The Supreme Court

Ruadhán Mac Cormaic is an Irish journalist and author who became editor of The Irish Times in 2022, following a career that included roles as a foreign affairs, migration, legal affairs, and Paris correspondent. A graduate of Trinity College Dublin, the University of Strasbourg, and Cambridge, he is also the author of the Supreme Court (2016).

== Career ==
Mac Cormaic studied history and politics at Trinity College Dublin. While in his second year, he edited the student newspaper Trinity News, and in his third year, he spent time at the University of Strasbourg as part of the Erasmus Student Exchange Programme. After graduating, he returned to Dublin, contributing freelance articles to The Irish Times, working as a sub-editor at the Sunday Tribune, and briefly holding a role akin to a walk-on part in the current affairs division of RTÉ Television. He then pursued a Master of Philosophy in modern European history at Cambridge University, during which time he considered whether to pursue a PhD or a career in journalism.

In 2007, he received the Douglas Gageby Fellowship for young journalists and joined The Irish Times on a three-month contract in the newsroom. This was extended multiple times before he was offered a staff position. Over the following years, he held several specialist reporting roles. He began as migration correspondent, followed by a posting as Paris correspondent. In this role, he covered events including the 2012 French presidential election and the Tunisian revolution. He commented on France's perception of Ireland's economic crisis, particularly concerning austerity measures and corporate tax policy.

He later became legal affairs correspondent, during which time he developed a strong interest in the judiciary. This led to the publication of his 2016 book The Supreme Court, a detailed account of the history, workings and influence of the Supreme Court of Ireland. He subsequently became foreign affairs correspondent, covering international developments such as the Syrian civil war and the 2016 US presidential election. His work during this period earned him the NewsBrands Ireland award for foreign coverage in 2017.

In 2017, Mac Cormaic was appointed assistant editor at The Irish Times. In that role he was involved in shaping the newspaper's institutional voice. He also edited the Lives Lost series, a project documenting Irish lives lost to COVID-19, which was recognised by NewsBrands in 2020 for best COVID-19 coverage.

=== Editor of The Irish Times ===
In 2022, following Paul O'Neill's decision to step down, Mac Cormaic was appointed editor of The Irish Times, becoming the 15th person to hold the position since the paper's founding in 1859. He officially took up the role on 26 October 2022. As editor, he also joined the board of The Irish Times DAC.

== Political views ==
The Phoenix has described Mac Cormaic's political views as centre-left.

== Personal life ==
Mac Cormaic is from Dublin and is fluent in Irish and French in addition to English. He is married to Jean O'Mahony, who works for the Irish Human Rights and Equality Commission and previously served as an adviser to Labour Party leader Eamon Gilmore.
