= Paddy Murray (journalist) =

Irish journalist and writer (1953–2022)

- Born: 5 August 1953
- Died: 24 February 2022 (aged 68)
- Education: Blackrock College
- Writing career
- Genres: journalism comedy
- Notable works: Evening Herald; Sunday World; Sunday Tribune

Patrick Thomas Murray (5 August 1953 – 24 February 2022) was an Irish journalist and writer. He wrote for the Evening Herald, Sunday World, and spent time as editor of the Sunday Tribune.

== Education ==
Born in Dublin, County Dublin, Leinster, Ireland, he was educated at Blackrock College. Murray spent a year attending University College Dublin (UCD). While there he wrote and performed comedy sketch shows as part of a three-man comedy group, The Machine. His partners in The Machine were Brendan Martin and Billy McGrath. While the trio were writing and rehearsing sketches for a forthcoming show, another student knocked on their door to offer a sketch he had written. The student's name was Dermot Morgan, who later found fame as the titular character in the television series Father Ted. Murray and Martin were instrumental in giving Morgan his break on television when they introduced him to the producer and writing team of RTÉ comedy series The Live Mike.

== Career ==
After leaving UCD, Murray studied journalism at the College of Commerce in Rathmines, Dublin. His first job at the end of the course was with the Evening Herald in Dublin and he interviewed John Wayne in the Gresham Hotel in the early 70s. Apart from a short time in the UK in the 1970s, Murray was employed by Independent Newspapers or one of its subsidiaries for most of his professional life. He was editor of the Sunday Tribune from 2003 until 2005.

Murray's comedy writing credits included: Week Ending BBC Radio 4; The Two Ronnies and Dave Allen at Large both BBC TV. For RTE television, he wrote for The Live Mike, The Late Late Show, Twink and many others. He wrote for stage, revue and stand-up comedians. He was one of the main contributors to the popular RTÉ satirical radio programme Green Tea starring Oliver Callan. He also wrote for Brendan O'Connor and for Callan's Kicks.

He was also President of Terenure Sports Club, a multi sports facility in the Dublin suburb.

Murray wrote a regular column in the Dublin paper, the Sunday World until May 2019 when he was told that, due to cutbacks, his column was being dropped, ending 46 years of writing for newspapers in the Independent Group. The last column appeared on 5 May 2019.

He edited the Blackrock College 150th anniversary book Fearless and Bold, published in November 2009.

In 2016, he was named Popular Columnist of the Year in the annual Newsbrands Ireland Newspaper Awards.

From March 2020, he wrote for the Irish Times about Covid 19 and his own health difficulties, and a blog, "The World According to Paddy". In 2021 he published a memoir And finally: A Journalist's life in 250 stories recalling his career in journalism.

== Personal life ==
Murray was married to Connie, who was Ireland's first female sports editor when she was appointed to that role in the Irish Daily Star in the 1990s, and they had one daughter, Charlotte. He died on 24 February 2022, at the age of 68.
