= The Hibernia Magazine =

Defunct Irish magazine

Hibernia
- Cover of the Hibernia, c. 1979
- Type: Magazine
- Format: Current affairs
- Founder: Basil Clancy
- Founded: 1937; 89 years ago
- Political alignment: Catholic (1937 to 1968 under Basil Clancy); Irish republican (1968 to 1980 under John Mulcahy)

The Hibernia Magazine was a magazine published in Ireland, initially as a monthly magazine then fortnightly. The Magazine was started in 1937 had a Catholic ethos, being supported by the Knights of Saint Columbanus It was edited and owned by Basil Clancy from 1949 until January 1968 when John Mulcahy (who went on to own The Phoenix) took over, when it became politically left-wing and republican.

The Magazine ceased publication in 1980, after it was sued by the RUC; following its closure, Mulcahy went on to set up the Sunday Tribune.

Over the years a number of public figures in Ireland contributed to the magazine: the economist Raymond Crotty, the TD Ernest Blythe and Proinsias Mac Aonghusa; others include agony aunt Angela McNamara, journalists Terry Keane, Hugo Monro, Brian Trench, Bruce Arnold, John Jordan Ulick O'Connor, Ed Moloney, Senator Alexis FitzGerald and Dr. Maurice Manning. The writer Maeve Binchy wrote a travel column for the magazine. Other writers who made regular contributions included Francis Stuart, Seamus Heaney, John Banville and Colm Toibin.

Many found it hard to adequately and accurately describe the content of the magazine; Conor Cruise O'Brien called it "a cross between the Good Wine Guide and Republican News", Vincent Browne referred to it as "liberal and sometimes radical", John Horgan described it as "irreverent”, “eclectic”, “crusading” and “investigative".
