= Business & Finance =

Fortnightly Irish business magazine (1964-)

- Categories: Business magazine
- Frequency: Fortnightly
- Publisher: Ian Hyland
- Founder: Hugh McLaughlin
- Founded: September 1964
- First issue: 18 September 1964
- Company: Catalyst Media Group
- Country: Ireland
- Language: English
- Website: businessandfinance.com
- ISSN: 0007-6473

Business & Finance (sometimes B&F) is an Irish business magazine published by Catalyst Media, that was established by Hugh McLaughlin in September 1964. It provides news, comment, and analysis on Irish and international news stories. The readership consists of business professionals, including senior level business leaders such as CEOs and heads of functions. It was a sister title to investigative news magazine Magill, which closed in 2009.

== History and circulation ==
The magazine has been published continually since its foundation in 1964. At the beginning of the 2000s, the magazine was published on a weekly basis. Its parent company was Belenos Publications, which acquired the magazine in 2001. It was acquired in 2002 by Catalyst Media, owners of Dublin Tech Summit.

From 2008 to 2012, Business & Finance was edited by John Walsh, who took over from Constantin Gurdgiev, who left in March 2008.

== Other titles ==
In 2025, Business & Finance has published several "top 100" indices, including CEO 100, CIO 100, CMO 100, and Top 100 Companies Leading in Wellbeing.

They have previously released other publications including 100 Great Irish Companies, (Note: Last published December 2016) CFO 100, (Note: Last published May 2016) CIO 100, (Note: Last published April 2017) Elevation Fast 100, (Note: Last published 2015) FDI 100, (Note: Last published February 2017) Financial Services 50, (Note: Last published December 2015) Fintech Ireland, (Note: Last published June 2016) Global 100, (Note: Last published November 2014) Ireland Inc, (Note: Last published March/April 2014) Life Science 50, (Note: Last published July 2016) Tech 100, (Note: Last published September 2016) Top 100 Companies in Ireland, (Note: Last published May 2015) Top 500, (Note: Last published May/June 2013) and Who's Who in Irish Business. (Note: Last published 2013)

== Other company operations ==
Business & Finance Media Group manages the Business & Finance Awards, in partnership with KPMG Ireland. The awards recognize Irish and international business leaders.

Previously, the presented several other awards and events including the Business & Finance Asia Pacific / Ireland Awards, (Note: Last presented in 2011) the Business & Finance US Awards, (Note: Last presented in 2011) Corporate Restructuring Summit, (Note: Last presented in 2012) the eircom Junior Spiders, (Note: Last presented in 2012) Golden Spider Awards, (Note: Also known as the eircom Spiders and the Spiders) Ireland Day, (Note: Last presented in 2012) and the Life Sciences International Summit. (Note: Last presented in 2012)

Also in the portfolio is the Top 1000 Companies in Ireland Database and a real-time online news portal.

== Controversy ==
Moranna Ltd., the company previously publishing Business & Finance, folded in early 2011 owing more than €500,000. A new debt-free company was then established to continue publishing the magazine.
