= Brian Rattigan v DPP =

Irish Supreme Court case

Brian Rattigan v Director of Public Prosecutions [2008] IESC 34
- Coat of arms of Ireland
- Court: Supreme Court of Ireland
- Decided: 7 May 2008

Case history
- Appealed from: Brian Rattigan v Director of Public Prosecutions [2005] 647 JR
- Appealed to: Brian Rattigan v Director of Public Prosecutions [2008] IESC 34

Court membership
- Judges sitting: Geoghegan J, Denham J, Hardiman J., Murray C.J., Fennelly J.

Case opinions
- This was a very serious case of Judicial Review regarding the possibility of achieving a fair trial in relation to a murder supposedly committed by Rattigan. In this case the severity of the case lead to the court rejecting the appeal and upholding the decision of the trial judge.
- Decision by: Justice Geoghegan
- Concurrence: Denham J. Fennelly J. Murray C.J. Hardiman J.

Keywords
- Constitution; Personal Rights; Right to Life; Unborn; Right to Travel; Abortion; Suicide; Injunction

Brian Rattigan v DPP [2008] IESC 34; [2008] 4 IR 639 was an Irish Supreme Court case in which the Court ruled that a criminal trial would be prohibited where prosecutorial delay or adverse pre-trial publicity created a substantial risk of unfairness to the accused.

== Background ==
On 25 August 2001 Declan Gavin was killed on Crumlin Road, Dublin 12. There had been an altercation involving passengers in a Nissan Micra car outside an Abrakebabra. From this car a person jumped out wearing a balaclava and holding a knife. This person then stabbed Declan Gavin, Gavin ran inside the Abrakebabra followed by the man brandishing a knife. The man with the knife did not gain entrance to the fast food restaurant as the security guard closed the door. After multiple failed attempts of forcing entry to the Abrakebabra he ran back to the car and sped off. There was a palm print in what appeared to a blood like substance on the window of the fast food restaurant, this print was identified as Brian Rattigan's palm print. Subsequently, a finger print from the door of Abrekabara was also found to be Brian Rattigans.

Rattigan was then arrested by the Gardaí and interviewed. Interviews were conducted and recorded on paper however Rattigan refused to sign any of these. Within these interviews Rattigan was "evasive and maintained that he had not been near Crumlin Shopping Centre for a considerable time." Rattigan claimed that he was not in the vicinity of Crumlin Road on 25 August 2001 nor was he near this place for several months. He made claims that he was having sexual relations with a married woman and refused to name the woman on the night of the attack on Gavin. However, this alibi was lacking any sufficient detail or supporting evidence. He then said that he was at his brother Joey's birthday party and that he did not leave this event all night. He made the comment that he will not admit anything and that it was the job of the Gardaí to prove it. When asked about his presence in the Nissan Micra car he said he could not remember. The many answers given by Rattigan were conflicting, at one stage he was at the party, then others he could not remember his whereabouts, other times when answering his affair with the married woman was his answer but when pressed on this issue he claimed not to be with her on 25 August 2001.

The glass window in Abrakebabra was replaced the previous week to the murder of Gavin and this window is cleaned around three times a week. Also of note the Nissan Micra which was at the scene of the stabbing was found burning in the Cookstown Industrial Estate shortly after the stabbing. This car was also stopped by a member of the Gardaí and it was confirmed that Shane Moloney and Joey Rattigan the brother of Brian Rattigan, were in the car.

This case based on the facts above appeared before the High Court, however issues arose in the fact that there was extreme delay by the DPP in bringing proceedings against Rattigan. There were severe delays in the production to the court of a book of evidence. This along with the media coverage of the legal proceeding was a contentious matter as Rattigan argued.

== Holding of the Supreme Court ==
Mr Justice Geoghan of the Supreme Court delivered the decision in this case of Rattigan's appeal of the decision of Mr. Justice O'Higgins in the High Court.

Rattigan made an application for judicial review on multiple grounds. In the High Court the injunction was refused against the DPP. The injunction was requested on three grounds, prosecutorial delay in bringing the prosecution, the alleged prejudicial media coverage which was proposed to negatively impact on Rattigan's chances of receiving a fair trial and finally it was alleged that there was a lack of recording of interviews.

In relation to the prosecutorial delay it was clear that there was significant time which elapsed in this case at all stages. In September 2001 Rattigan was arrested but was released days later. He was then rearrested in November 2001. The file on Rattigan's alleged murder of Gavin was given to the Chief Prosecution Solicitor in March 2002, it was then forwarded to the DPP at the end of the same month. It was not until September 2003 that Rattigan was to be charged with the murder. He was then charged and remanded in custody until November 2003. After appearing before the District Judge seven times the case was struck out, due to undue delay in December 2003. The 16 month delay before Rattigan was again charged was accompanied by various excuses. These excuses included the fact that changes had to be made to the book of evidence because of recent case law and the choice to rely on finger print evidence. The Supreme Court did not accept this argument. Whilst being critical of the DPP for the extensive delay the Court did not find that this was grounds for the injunction to be granted in favour of Rattigan and to dismiss the murder trial against him.

A minor ground which was referred to in relation to the judicial review was the lack of electronic recording. This point was given little attention and was seen as irrelevant, the complaint in relation to this was lodged regarding the witness statements. This was irrelevant as these could not be entered into court but rather the witness would have to give evidence in Court. Furthermore, reference was made to the fact that there was no legal obligation in relation to recording the interviews at that time. These arguments were rejected by Justice Geoghegan

The prejudicial media coverage was alleged to be occurring in relation to the murder trial but also the trial in the High Court for judicial review. Justice Geoghegan did state that there were newspaper articles which could have had the effect of creating an unfair trial. The right to a fair trial has been established in this case as a constitutional right which is superior. However, this right is being addressed in light of the right of the public to a fair prosecution especially in the case of a crime so severe as this case. The Court took the stance that the publicity had occurred before the trial and therefore had faded from the memory of persons and the length of the trial usually suggests that an unfair trial as a result of the media coverage will reduce. In this instance too the Supreme Court agreed with the decision reached by the High Court and found that the alleged prejudicial media coverage was not in fact a reason for this trial to be abandoned. There was reference made to further media coverage which had been published following the trial in the High Court which was assessed by the Supreme Court. An issue arose in relation to a Sunday Tribune and Daily Mail articles about which there were contempt of court proceedings issued. These cases remained unsettled until after the decision of the Court in the judicial review case brought by Rattigan. This material was apologised for and a confirmation that information similar to that which was contained in the article would not be reproduced.

In this case it was understood that the independent evidence of the blood fingerprint was strong and to prohibit the trial on the risk of unfairness due to media courage would not be correct. In conclusion the appeal on the grounds of judicial review was not granted and the case was allowed to proceed even though there was a delay by the DPP. The judgement issued by Justice Geoghegan was supported with concurring decisions by all other Judges in the case.

== See also ==
Crumlin-Drimnagh feud

Shooting of David Byrne

Media bias
