= Entertainment.ie =

Irish web company

- Founded: 3 August 1997
- Headquarters: Dublin, Ireland
- Area served: Ireland
- Owner: Packed.House
- Founders: Julian Douglas, Mat May, Diarmaid Mac Aonghusa
- Key people: David O'Shaughnessy (Editor)
- Website: entertainment.ie
- Commercial: Yes

Entertainment.ie is an Irish web company based in Dublin. The company provides news and reviews of programs and films for TV and the cinema. It also provides information on upcoming comedies, festivals, theater shows and music in Ireland, as well as celebrity news and gossip.

The site was developed in 1997 by Fusio.

The Irish Times acquired a 30% stake in the company in May 2007.

== Awards ==
Entertainment.ie won the 2005 Golden Spider Media Award as Irish Entertainment website of the year. It won the award for Best Entertainment Site at the Digital Media Awards Grand Prix in 2006 and Best Entertainment Website at the Irish Web Awards in 2008.

== Mobile ==
Entertainment.ie has seven mobile apps, including:

- Celebrity showbiz gossip – gives free access to celebrity stories, images and videos. It is available for IOS devices.
- Tv Guide Ireland – 7-day TV listing with program details and descriptions for 95 channels (IOS).
- Cinema Guide Ireland – free app that shows cinema listings, film reviews, film trailers and film news. It has every cinema screen in Ireland listed (IOS/Android).
- Entertainment.ie – listings and details for over 7,000 venues (IOS/Android).

In January 2014, Entertainment.ie acquired Beaut.ie, an Irish beauty blog for women. The blog had previously decided to cease business after eight years.
