= Ursula Halligan =

Irish political editor

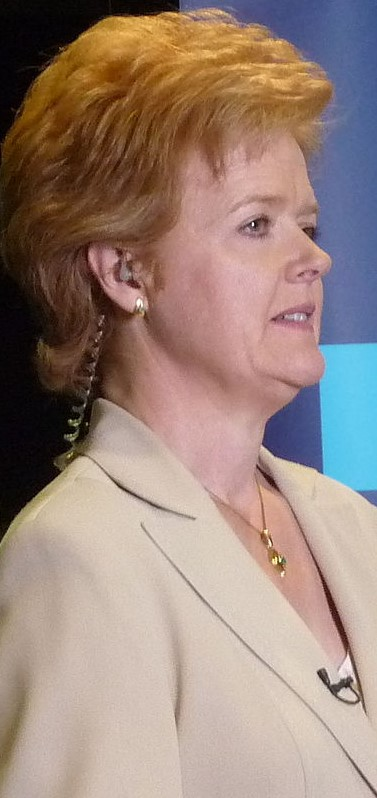
- Ursula Halligan at the RDS in 2009
- Born: 1960 (age 64–65)
- Occupation: Journalist
- Notable credit(s): RTÉ Current Affairs; TV3 News

Ursula Halligan is an Irish journalist who was the political editor of Ireland's main independent television station, TV3.

== Biography ==
Halligan grew up in Templeogue, Dublin. She is a Catholic. Her late brother, Professor Aidan Halligan (1957–2015), who held a number of senior leadership positions in English medicine including Deputy Chief Medical Officer for England, refused the appointment in 2004 by the Irish Government as the first head of the Health Service Executive, and was "a giant in British medicine" according to the NHS Alliance. It was not until 1990 that she entered journalism. She worked at the Sunday Tribune and Vincent Browne's Magill magazine. After a period with RTÉ News and Current Affairs, she joined TV3 at its inception. In 2000, she won TV Journalist of the Year at her country's National Media Awards. She presented The Political Party, the channel's main weekend current affairs programme until the show was axed as part of wider cutbacks due to the station's financial situation, in March 2009.

On 26 December 2009, Halligan famously disclosed during a TV3 news broadcast that the then Minister for Finance Brian Lenihan Jnr had been diagnosed with pancreatic cancer. Among those who criticised her were Taoiseach Brian Cowen, senior government members and the Sunday Independent. However, she did receive support from numerous other publications and journalists, including the political bi-weekly Village magazine, Ger Colleran, editor of the Irish Daily Star tabloid and the Phoenix magazine, who stated that "If a report of the finance minister facing a serious illness while simultaneously grappling with the biggest financial crisis in the history of the state is not in the public interest then nothing is".

In September 2011, Halligan presented a three-part series on the rise and fall of Fianna Fáil, the party wiped out at the general election of the previous February.

In July 2012, Halligan was involved in a direct showdown with the Taoiseach, Enda Kenny, after Kenny was asked about his opposition to same-sex marriage outside the National Library, a question which caused him to veer into a flowerpot. Government press secretary Feargal Purcell complained of assault to Halligan's bosses and called her a "disgraceful" woman. Witnesses, and there were plenty (including at least 20 journalists and RTÉ television cameras) said one of Kenny's political advisers, a Mark Kennelly, had aggressively "barged" across Halligan. One of them said: "He was like a rugby player about to tackle someone. If anyone was assaulted it was probably Ursula Halligan." The incident became referred to as "flowergate" due to the flowerpot into which the Taoiseach had landed.

In an article published in The Irish Times on 15 May 2015, Halligan came out as gay, writing that she had fallen in love with a girl in her class at the age of 17 and had written in her diary then: "There have been times when I have even thought about death, of escaping from this world, of sleeping untouched by no-one forever. I have been so depressed, so sad and so confused." Accordingly, she announced her support for a 'yes' vote in the Marriage Equality referendum, scheduled for the following week. Her absence from TV3's coverage of the referendum campaign had been remarked upon, Halligan having previously informed her employer of her position. She endorsed a YES vote as "the most Christian thing to do", a position that forced her out of the channel's referendum coverage. Halligan's article was well received; fellow broadcaster Graham Norton called it “heartbreaking” and retweeted it to his one-million followers. An article by Miriam Lord on Halligan's public acknowledgement of her sexual orientation was well received. Referring to the close proximity of her disclosure to the referendum seven days later, Halligan said she had intended to deal with the matter two weeks earlier, only to be delayed by the untimely death of her brother.
