= John Mulcahy (journalist) =

Irish journalist and editor (1932–2018)

- Born: John Denis Mulcahy; May 17, 1932; Perth, Western Australia, Australia
- Died: September 7, 2018 (aged 86); Dublin, Ireland
- Education: Clongowes Wood College
- Alma mater: Trinity College Dublin
- Occupations: Journalist; editor; publisher
- Spouse: Nuala O'Farrell (m. 1957)
- Children: 8, including Michael Mulcahy
- Writing career
- Pen name: Goldhawk
- Language: English
- Years active: 1968–2007
- Period: 1960s–2018
- Genres: Investigative journalism; Satire
- Subjects: Politics; Business; the Arts
- Notable works: Hibernia; The Sunday Tribune; The Phoenix; Irish Arts Review; Union (2009)

John Mulcahy (17 May 1932 – 7 September 2018) was an Irish journalist, magazine and newspaper editor, and publisher, who founded The Sunday Tribune newspaper and The Phoenix magazine.

Born in Perth, Western Australia, he moved to Ireland as a child following the death of his father, and was educated at Clongowes Wood College and Trinity College Dublin. After working in the financial sector in Canada and Ireland, he took over the ailing Catholic periodical Hibernia in 1968, transforming it into a fortnightly, and later weekly, current affairs magazine noted for its investigative coverage of Irish politics, business and The Troubles.

Following the closure of Hibernia in 1980, amid a series of libel actions, Mulcahy co-founded The Sunday Tribune with the publisher Hugh McLaughlin, though he departed the newspaper within a year. In 1983 he launched The Phoenix, a fortnightly satirical and current affairs magazine which, through its pseudonymous "Goldhawk" column, published a series of investigations into prominent figures in Irish business and politics, including Charles Haughey. He remained proprietor-editor of the magazine until 2007, after which his son Aengus took over its running. In 2002, Mulcahy also became proprietor-editor of the Irish Arts Review, broadening its readership and production values over the following sixteen years, and he later served on the board of governors of the National Gallery of Ireland.

Mulcahy was widely credited with mentoring a generation of Irish journalists who went on to prominent careers in the country's media, including Maeve Binchy and Geraldine Kennedy. He was married to Nuala O'Farrell, who worked alongside him as literary editor at both Hibernia and The Phoenix, and the couple had eight children, one of whom, Michael Mulcahy, served as a Lord Mayor of Dublin and TD. Mulcahy died in Dublin in September 2018, aged 86, having continued to work on the Irish Arts Review until shortly before his death.

== Early life ==
John Denis Mulcahy was born on 17 May 1932 in Perth, Western Australia, the fourth and youngest child of Daniel Mulcahy, a doctor, and Josephine Mulcahy (née Delaney), a nurse. His father was known by the nickname "Digger". His older siblings were Michael, later a psychiatrist (d. 2021); Peggy Avis (d. 1954); and Deirdre Bunbury (d. 2009). Mulcahy's grandfather had emigrated from County Tipperary to Australia in the 1880s, prospering in mining in Western Australia and as a hotelier in Fremantle and Boulder. The Irish Independent's obituary states that the grandfather made his fortune in the Australian gold fields before returning home to Ireland, though this detail is not corroborated by other sources. Mulcahy's father died suddenly in Perth in July 1935, when Mulcahy was three years old.

Following his father's death, Mulcahy's mother brought the family back to Ireland, settling in Ballinakill, County Laois. She remarried a second doctor, Pat Nyhan, who also died when Mulcahy was fifteen and a pupil at Clongowes Wood College. According to the Irish Independent, she went on to marry a third time and lived between Dublin and Bermuda. Mulcahy was educated at Killashee junior school and Clongowes Wood College, both in County Kildare. On leaving school he worked in hotels in Switzerland and London, before returning to Ireland to study economics and history at night at Trinity College Dublin while working for a chemical company, and later as a financial adviser to a wealthy Dublin family.

Mulcahy graduated in 1956 and moved to Montreal, Canada, where he worked first for the Canadian subsidiary of Imperial Chemical Industries and then for a financial advisory company, and began writing on business for the Montreal Financial Times. He married Nuala O'Farrell, whom he had met at a twenty-first birthday party in Howth, in New York in 1957, shortly before his mother and stepfather moved there. The couple's first child, Nicholas, was born in Montreal in 1958.

== Career ==
=== Hibernia ===
Mulcahy and his wife returned to Ireland around 1960, where he found employment with the businessman Con Smith, an investor in the monthly magazine Hibernia, for which he was already writing. In January 1968 he raised the funds to take over the title from Basil Clancy, becoming proprietor-editor and immediately moving it to a fortnightly schedule. Under Mulcahy the magazine adopted a sharper, more critical editorial line; the writer and politician Conor Cruise O'Brien was quoted as describing it as "a cross between the Good Wine Guide and Republican News". Hibernia became embroiled in the internal split within Sinn Féin, and its critical stance towards Official Sinn Féin and the Official IRA reportedly put Mulcahy's own life under threat. Hibernia also gave particular attention to The Troubles, corruption in the planning process and the conduct of the Royal Ulster Constabulary. In 1974, he organised a petition against internment that gathered more than 100,000 signatures, which he personally delivered to the British government at 10 Downing Street.

Hibernia employed a number of journalists early in their careers who went on to prominent roles in Irish media, including Maeve Binchy and Nuala O'Faolain. The magazine moved to weekly publication in 1977. It also carried a pseudonymous gossip column styled "Tom Luby", to which business and political figures reportedly supplied anecdotes on the understanding that they themselves would not be named in it. In 1980, the column published an untrue story concerning a priest, Fr Michael Egan of Granard, County Longford, and his appearance before Judge Seán Delap on a drunk-driving charge. Egan was awarded £17,000 in damages, and with a further action pending from Delap, Mulcahy closed the magazine in October 1980.

=== The Sunday Tribune ===
Following the closure of Hibernia, Mulcahy co-founded The Sunday Tribune in November 1980 with the publisher Hugh McLaughlin, who had previously launched the Sunday World. Accounts differ as to the manner of Mulcahy's departure from the newspaper. The Irish Times and The Times reported that he resigned within about a year owing to difficulties in his working relationship with McLaughlin, though not before appointing Geraldine Kennedy as the country's first female political correspondent at a national newspaper. The Dictionary of Irish Biography, as cited by the Irish Independent, instead states that McLaughlin ousted Mulcahy and brought in the Smurfit packaging group as a new partner, after which the paper was rejuvenated under editor Conor Brady. The same source attributes the newspaper's early difficulties to inadequate funding and what it described as ill-advised journalistic and editorial appointments.

=== The Phoenix ===
In January 1983, Mulcahy founded The Phoenix, a fortnightly current affairs and satirical magazine, serving as its proprietor-editor. The magazine was controlled by Penfield Enterprises, through which Mulcahy and his wife Nuala provided their services. He also provided the voice of the magazine's pseudonymous columnist "Goldhawk" in radio advertisements broadcast over several decades. The reference work Modern Irish Lives noted that the magazine had subjected Ireland's business, political, media and artistic circles to unwanted attention.

The "Goldhawk" column published a series of investigations into public figures, including Charles Haughey's finances, Michael Smurfit's involvement in a property deal concerning Telecom Éireann, the revelation of a child fathered by the priest Michael Cleary, and details of a large pension payment made to Michael Fingleton of Irish Nationwide. Pursuit of such stories led to a number of libel actions, referred to by the magazine as visits to "the Four Goldmines" (a pun on the Four Courts). The magazine's circulation reportedly peaked at almost 20,000 copies before declining to a little over half that figure by the time of Mulcahy's death.

Mulcahy stepped back from active involvement with the magazine in 2007. His son Aengus later took over the running of the magazine, and his daughter Brigid took over the Irish Arts Review; another son, Michael, served for a period as a Fianna Fáil TD.

=== Digger ===
In 1987, Mulcahy attempted to replicate The Phoenix in the United Kingdom with a London-based magazine, Digger, moving frequently between Dublin and London over a period of about seven months. The publication was unable to compete with the long-established Private Eye and folded amid the costs of legal actions, after which Mulcahy returned his attention to The Phoenix.

=== Irish Arts Review and National Gallery ===
In January 2002, Mulcahy became proprietor-editor of the Irish Arts Review, then an annual publication with a small circulation. Under his editorship the magazine moved to a quarterly schedule, increased in page size, and grew its readership beyond that of its British counterpart, Modern Painters. His final edition of the Review was published in the week of his death.

In 2008, Mulcahy was appointed by the government to the board of governors of the National Gallery of Ireland, on which he served for five years. He subsequently led a "Save our Rubens" campaign opposing the sale abroad of works from the Beit Foundation art collection.

=== Union ===
Mulcahy was the author of a self-published historical novel, Union (2009), set against the background of the 1798 rebellion, the 1800 Act of Union and the 1803 rebellion led by Robert Emmet.

== Personal life ==
Mulcahy married Nuala O'Farrell in New York in 1957. Nuala worked alongside him as literary and book reviews editor at Hibernia and The Phoenix, and he credited her with stimulating his interest in the arts. The couple had eight children: Nicholas, Michael, Natasha, Stephen, Brigid, John ("Jack"), Hugh and Aengus. Their daughter Natasha died in a road accident near the family home in Ranelagh in 1968, aged six.

Of his children, Nicholas worked with his father before moving to the Sunday Business Post and later founding the magazine Business Plus. Aengus worked for The Phoenix and later took ownership of the magazine. Brigid studied photography in Perth, Western Australia, and became sole owner and editor of the Irish Arts Review. His son Michael Mulcahy was a Dublin city councillor, Lord Mayor of Dublin, TD and senator, representing Fianna Fáil.

Despite his reputation as the anonymous "Goldhawk", Mulcahy was recalled by colleagues as charming and erudite, and as supportive of young writers.

== Death ==
Mulcahy died on 7 September 2018, aged 86, following a long illness, having continued to work on the Irish Arts Review in the weeks beforehand. In accordance with his wishes, his body was donated to the Royal College of Surgeons in Ireland. A memorial Mass was held on 13 September 2018 at St Mary's Church, Haddington Road, Dublin, attended by President Michael D. Higgins, who described Mulcahy's contribution to Irish critical and aesthetic thought as "innovative and immense".

He was survived by his wife Nuala and his children Nick, Michael, Stephen, Brigid, Jack, Hugh and Aengus, having been predeceased by his daughter Natasha.
