= Fergus Pyle =

- Born: March 17, 1935; Dublin, Ireland
- Died: April 11, 1997 (aged 62)

Fergus Pyle (17 March 1935 – 11 April 1997) was an Irish journalist, and editor of The Irish Times from 1974–1977.

He was born in Dublin and educated at Aravon School in Bray, Campbell College, Belfast and Trinity College, Dublin, where he read Latin and French. He went on a scholarship to the University of Freiburg, and spent a year as a stagiaire to the United Nations in New York City. Following this, he worked in London where he edited Tuairim magazine. Notably, he interviewed Conor Cruise O'Brien in the immediate aftermath of the Congo Crisis, on the strength of which he recruited by The Irish Times.

His father William Pyle MRIA was an academic in the English Department in Trinity College Dublin. Fergus Pyle married to Mary Burrows, daughter of the actress Rachel Burrows.

In 1967, he opened the Belfast office of The Irish Times, and then opened the Paris office in 1971 prior to Ireland's entry into the Common Market, when he moved to Brussels in 1973. He took over editorship of the paper in 1974 and remained until 1977 when he left to become Information Officer at Trinity College, Dublin.

He re-joined The Irish Times during Conor Brady's editorship. He spent some time in Belfast as Northern Editor. Following the fall of the Berlin Wall, he spent six months in Berlin. On his return from Germany, he became chief editorial writer. He remained with The Irish Times until his death in 1997.
