= Fintan O'Toole =

Irish journalist, literary editor and drama critic (born 1958)

Fintan O'Toole MRIA
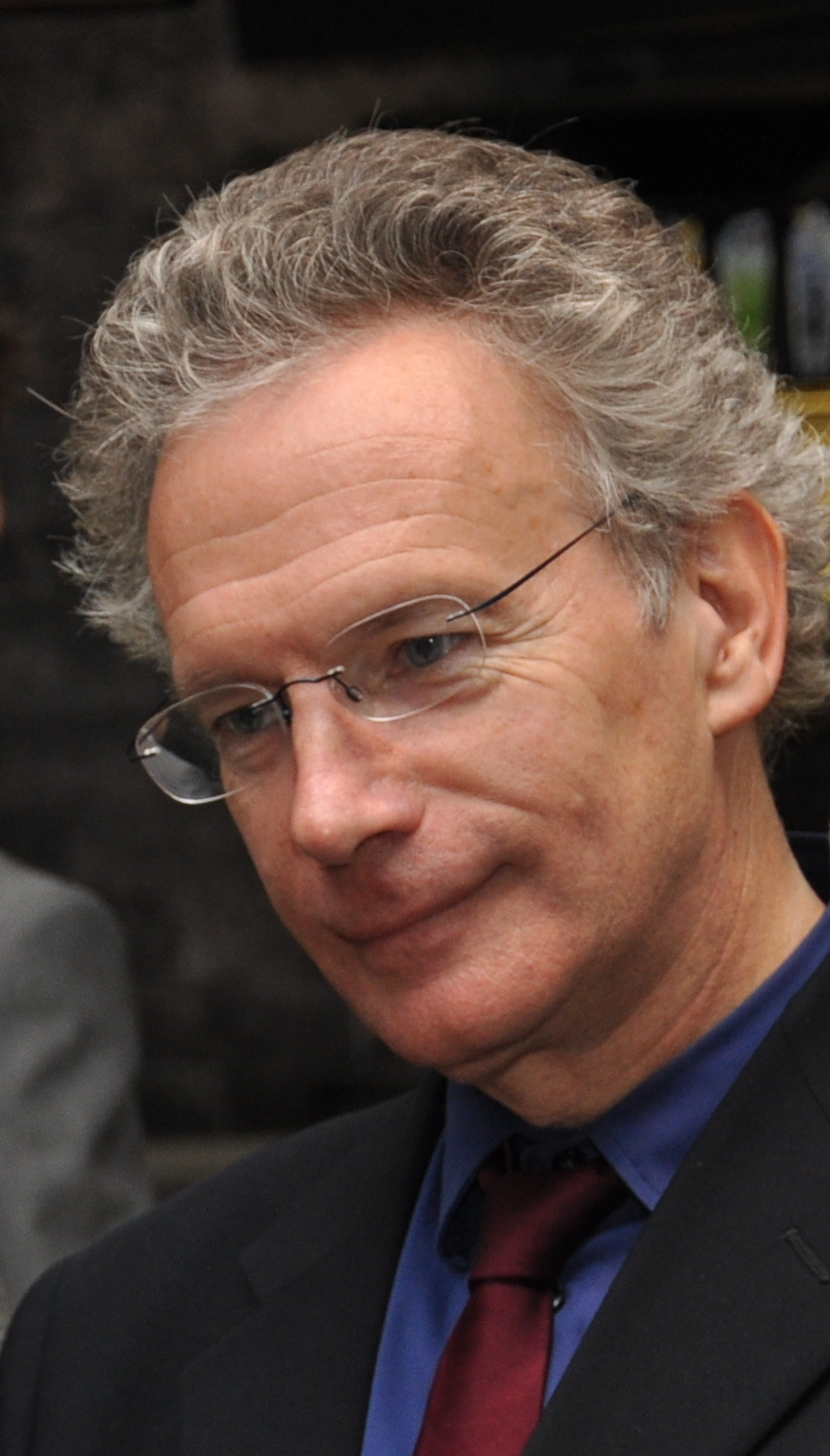
- O'Toole in 2010
- Born: 16 February 1958 (age 68); Dublin, Ireland
- Education: University College Dublin
- Occupations: Journalist, writer, critic

Fintan O'Toole (born 16 February 1958) is an Irish journalist, literary editor, and drama critic for The Irish Times, for which he has written since 1988. He was drama critic for the New York Daily News from 1997 to 2001 and is Advising Editor and a regular contributor to The New York Review of Books. He is also an author, literary critic, historical writer and political commentator.

In 2011, The Observer named O'Toole one of "Britain's top 300 intellectuals", despite not being British or living in the United Kingdom. Between 2012 and 2024, O'Toole was a visiting lecturer in Irish letters at Princeton University and contributed to the Fund for Irish Studies Series.

== Early life and education ==
O'Toole was born in Dublin in a working-class family. He was educated at Scoil Íosagáin and Coláiste Chaoimhín in Crumlin (both run by the Christian Brothers) and at University College Dublin (UCD). He graduated from the university in 1978 with a Bachelor of Arts in English and philosophy.

== Career ==
In 1980, O'Toole became In Dublin magazine's drama critic. He joined the Sunday Tribune upon its relaunch by Vincent Browne in 1983, and worked as its drama critic, literary editor, arts editor, and feature writer. From 1986 to 1987 he edited Magill magazine.

O'Toole joined The Irish Times as a columnist in 1988 and his columns have appeared twice weekly ever since. He took a sabbatical in 1990–91 to work as literary adviser to the Abbey Theatre. In 1994 he was one of the presenters of the last season of BBC TV's The Late Show. From 1997 to 2001 he was the New York Daily News's drama critic. In 2011, he was appointed literary editor of The Irish Times. He also has published articles regularly in the New York Review of Books and The Guardian.

In 2017, Faber and Faber commissioned O'Toole to write an official biography of Seamus Heaney. O'Toole said of the process that his "one terror is that [Heaney's] favourite communication mode was the fax, and faxes fade."

In 2018, he was awarded the UCD Alumni Award in Arts & Humanities.

From 2012 to 2024, he was the Visiting Leonard L. Milberg ’53 Professor in Irish Letters at Princeton University.

== Views ==
O'Toole has criticised what he sees as unfavorable attitudes toward immigration in Ireland, the state of Ireland's public services, growing inequality during Ireland's economic boom, the Iraq War, and the U.S. military's use of Shannon Airport, among other issues. In 2006, he spent six months reporting for The Irish Times in China.

O'Toole's former editor, Geraldine Kennedy, was paid more than the editor of the UK's top non-tabloid newspaper, The Daily Telegraph, which has a circulation about nine times that of The Irish Times. Later, O'Toole told a rival Irish paper, the Sunday Independent:

We as a paper are not shy of preaching about corporate pay and fat cats but with this, there is a sense of excess. Some of the sums mentioned are disturbing. This is not an attack on Ms Kennedy, it is an attack on the executive level of pay. There is a double-standard of seeking more job cuts while paying these vast salaries.

In June 2012, O'Toole compared the Irish Constitutional Convention to the American Citizens Union, a reformist political organisation that the New York City political machine Tammany Hall did not bother to suppress so long as it did not threaten its hegemony.

In August 2019, after the selection of Boris Johnson as Prime Minister of the United Kingdom, O'Toole proposed to get Parliament to back an alternative Cabinet who would push back the October deadline for Brexit to allow a trade deal to be negotiated. The proposal required seven Sinn Féin MPs in northern Irish border constituencies to resign in favour of a pact between the four largest anti-Brexit parties in Ireland, thereby triggering by-elections at a certain date in mid-September. O’Toole believed they would result in a more hardline anti-Brexit parliamentary faction that would make a stronger case for a no-confidence vote in Johnson. Sinn Féin leader Mary Lou McDonald sharply criticised the proposal, saying the existing anti-Brexit factions in Parliament were strong enough without the party making too many policy concessions.

O'Toole's 26 June 2018 Irish Times column examined how the Donald Trump administration's policies and public-facing communications about immigration and asylum seekers from Mexico might be deliberately calculated to bring elements of fascism to the U.S. An April 2020 column in The Irish Times asserted that Trump's destruction of the public image and reputation of the US culminated with his bungling of the COVID-19 pandemic crisis, and that subsequently pity was the only appropriate feeling for the American people.

In a 2024 New York Review of Books essay, O'Toole rejects the common interpretation of William Shakespeare's tragedies in terms of protagonists' flaws leading to their own destruction. "So what does Shakespeare teach us?" he asks, and replies: "Nothing. His tragic theater is not a classroom. It is a fairground wall of death in which the characters are being pushed outward by the centrifugal force of the action but held in place by the friction of the language. [...] We return to the tragedies not in search of behavioral education but because the wilder the terror Shakespeare unleashes, the deeper is the pity and the greater the wonder that, even in the howling tempest, we can still hear the voices of broken individuals so amazingly articulated."

== Selected publications ==
=== Books ===
- The Politics of Magic: the Work and Times of Tom Murphy. 1987.
- A Mass for Jesse James: A Journey Through 1980s Ireland, 1990
- Black Hole, Green Card: The Disappearance of Ireland, 1994
- Meanwhile Back at the Ranch: The Politics of Irish Beef, 1994
- Macbeth & Hamlet, 1995
- A Traitor’s Kiss: The Life of Richard Brinsley Sheridan, 1997
- The Ex-Isle of Ireland: Images of a Global Ireland, 1997
- The Lie of the Land, 1998
- The Irish Times Book of the Century, 1999
- Shakespeare is Hard But So is Life, 2002
- Contributor, Granta 77: What We Think of America, 2002
- "Jubilee", Granta 79: Celebrity, 2002
- After The Ball, 2003
- Post Washington: Why America Can't Rule the World, 2005 (with Tony Kinsella)
- White Savage: William Johnson and the Invention of America, 2005
- The Irish Times Book of The 1916 Rising, 2006 (with Shane Hegarty)
- Ship of Fools, How Stupidity And Corruption Sank The Celtic Tiger, 2009
- Enough is Enough: How to Build a New Republic, 2010
- Up the Republic!: Towards a New Ireland (editor), 2012
- A History of Ireland in 100 Objects, 2013
- Modern Ireland in 100 Artworks, 2016
- Judging Shaw, 2017
- Heroic Failure: Brexit and the Politics of Pain, 2018
- The Politics of Pain: Postwar England and the Rise of Nationalism, 2019
- Three Years in Hell: The Brexit Chronicles, 2020
- We Don't Know Ourselves: A Personal History of Ireland Since 1958, 2021
- For and against a united Ireland, 2025 (with Sam McBride)

=== Articles ===
- Fintan O'Toole, "The King of Little England", The New York Review of Books, vol. LXVIII, no. 10 (10 June 2021), pp. 44–46. About Boris Johnson.
- Fintan O'Toole, "Eldest Statesmen", The New York Review of Books, vol. LXXI, no. 1 (18 January 2024), pp. 17–19. "Biden's signature achievements as president [are] securing large-scale investment in infrastructure and in the transition to a carbon-free economy... [But t]here has been a relentless decline in absolute [economic] mobility from one generation to the next..." (p. 18.) "With the promised bridge to a new generation as yet unbuilt, time is not on Biden's side, or on the side of American democracy." (p. 19.)
- Fintan O’Toole, “The Second Coming,” The New York Review of Books, vol. LXXI, no. 19 (5 December 2024), pp. 1, 6, 8. "Trump’s second coming may not quite herald the end of the world, but it will hand the ship of state over to a motley crew of libertines and libertarians, control freaks and fanatics. It will stage its own spectacles of mass roundups and treason trials for the amusement of the many millions who are, it now seems abundantly clear, entertained by exhibitions of cruelty. It will be a nonstop show, its cacophonous soundtrack amplified by Elon Musk and the thriving denizens of the digital manosphere." (p. 8.)

== Awards ==
- 1981 National Press Awards, The Young Journalist Award
- 1993 AT Cross Award for Supreme Contribution to Irish Journalism
- 1993 Justice Media Award of the Incorporated Law Society
- 2000 Millennium Social Inclusion Award
- 2012 TV3 Tonight Show Journalist of the Year
- 2013 Irish Book Awards (Best Irish Published Book of the Year), A History of Ireland in 100 Objects
- 2014 National LGBT Federation GALA Journalist/Broadcaster Award
- 2014 Awarded Honorary Doctorate in Letters for services to broadcasting by Queen's University Belfast
- 2017 European Press Prize (Commentator Award)
- 2017 Orwell Prize for Journalism
- 2017 Awarded Honorary Doctorate in Laws by NUI Galway
- 2017 NewsBrands Ireland Journalism Awards Broadsheet Columnist of the Year
- 2018 NewsBrands Ireland Journalism Awards Broadsheet Columnist of the Year
- 2018 University College Dublin UCD Alumni Award in Arts & Humanities
- 2019 Awarded Honorary Doctorate in Letters by Trinity College Dublin
- 2019 Appointed the 2019-20 Parnell Fellow of Magdalene College, Cambridge.
- 2020 NewsBrands Ireland Journalism Awards Broadsheet Columnist of the Year
- 2020 Member of the Royal Irish Academy
- 2021 Irish Book Awards (Odgers Berndtson Non-Fiction Book of the Year) for We Don’t Know Ourselves: A Personal History of Ireland Since 1958
- 2021 Irish Book Awards (An Post Irish Book of the Year) for We Don’t Know Ourselves: A Personal History of Ireland Since 1958
- 2022 Awarded Honorary Doctorate in Letters by Glasgow University
- 2023 Member of the American Academy of Arts & Sciences
- 2024 Robert B. Silvers Prize for Journalism
- 2024 Member of the American Philosophical Society
- 2024 Eire Society of Boston Gold Medal
- 2024 iBAM! Award for Media/Journalism
- 2024-2025 Christopher Ewart-Biggs Memorial Prize (with Sam McBride) for "For and Against a United Ireland"
- 2026 NewsBrands Ireland Journalism Awards Broadsheet Columnist of the Year
