= Hugh McLaughlin (publisher) =

Hugh McLaughlin (October 1918 – 1 January 2006) was an Irish publisher and inventor. He was married to Nuala Ryan.

McLaughlin was born at Killygordan, County Donegal, in Ulster, the youngest child of a stationmaster. At 16, he became a barman's apprentice in Gardiner Street in Dublin, the largest city in Ireland. In 1935 he established a tailoring business with his sister Anne Beggs. By 1950 he was involved with a printing company called Fleet and began publishing magazines for greyhound owners. He printed Kavanagh's Weekly in 1952, which featured Patrick Kavanagh. Due to this success, Hugh McLaughlin decided to continue to publish indigenous Irish magazines. These would compete with British magazines. Titles included Creation, which was edited by his wife Nuala, Woman's Way, Woman's Choice, Business & Finance, This Week and Nikki. These magazines were published by his company, the Creation Group.

Business & Finance, still published today, is a business magazine established by McLaughlin in September 1964. He believed he could repeat in business media the success that was achieved by Irish Farmers Journal, which he had played a key role in establishing. Business and Finance was initially owned equally by McLaughlin himself; Noel Speidel, a surveyor with whom he had carried out successful property developments in Dublin, and its founder-editor Nicholas Leonard, who resigned as the financial editor of The Irish Times to join it. In 1965 all of McLaughlin's printing and publishing activities were combined in a new holding company called Creation Property and Printing, later changed to Creation Group. New Hibernia acquired a convertible loan interest in the company in the summer of 1965.

In October 1968 the News of the World bought a majority shareholding in the Creation group. Later on the same day, Robert Maxwell made a takeover bid for the British tabloid. The bid was rejected and the News of the World ended up being controlled by Rupert Murdoch. Following this, the Carr family, who were previously the largest shareholders in the News of the World, bought the majority holding in Creation group.

In 1973 McLaughlin founded the Sunday World with his business partner Gerry McGuinness. By 1977 Creation went into liquidation, which resulted in magazine titles being sold and in 1978 Independent Newspapers took a 54 per cent stake in the Sunday World. Hugh McLaughlin went on to establish another Sunday newspaper, the Sunday Tribune, with business partner John Mulcahy. In 1982 he unsuccessfully launched a daily newspaper, the Daily News. This was to be his last publishing venture.

In retirement, McLaughlin invented a machine, the Water Hog, that removed water from cricket pitches and putting greens.
