= Eileen Battersby =

American-born Irish journalist (1956–2018)

- Born: Eileen Whiston; 4 June 1956; Los Angeles County, California, U.S.
- Died: 23 December 2018 (aged 62); Oldbridge, County Meath, Ireland
- Education: University College, Dublin
- Occupation: Literary critic
- Children: 1
- Writing career
- Notable work: Teethmarks on My Tongue (2016)
- Notable awards: National Arts Journalist of the Year (4 times); National Critic of the Year Prize (2012)

Eileen Battersby (née Whiston; 4 June 1956 – 23 December 2018) was the chief literary critic of The Irish Times. She sometimes divided opinion, having been described by John Banville as "the finest fiction critic we have", while attracting the ire of Eugene McCabe after she gave Dermot Healy an unfavourable review in 2011. Her first novel, Teethmarks on My Tongue, was published by Dalkey Archive Press in 2016.

== Biography ==
Battersby was born in Los Angeles County, California. After moving with her family to Ireland, she attended secondary school at Loreto in Bray, County Wicklow. She went on to graduate with honours in English and History from University College, Dublin, and later received an honours MA degree on American writer Thomas Wolfe. She began reviewing fiction in 1984. Her reviews of books and sports writing led her into a career in journalism as a staff arts writer with The Irish Times, eventually becoming their chief literary correspondent. She wrote on archaeology, history, architecture, geography and horses and championed fiction in translation.

Battersby published a memoir, Ordinary Dogs: A Story of Two Lives (2011), about her two rescue dogs. Her collection Second Readings (2010) features 52 of her reviews. She won the National Arts Journalist of the Year award four times. She also won the National Critic of the Year prize in 2012.

In 2011, controversy ensued when Battersby found Dermot Healy's novel Long Time, No See wanting. Her unfavourable review prompted an angry letter of protest from Eugene McCabe who castigated her for disemboweling "one of the great masters of Irish writing." However, others like Jon McGregor said of a critical review from Battersby of his first novel "The things she picked up on were the criticisms I’d now have – it’s overwritten, an explosion of similes, sentimentality, overdeterministic plotting. She let rip, but you felt it was coming from a proper critic."

== Death ==
Battersby and her daughter were involved in a single-vehicle accident in Oldbridge, four kilometres outside Drogheda on 22 December 2018. Both required hospitalisation; Battersby died the following day. She was 62. President Michael D. Higgins paid tribute to Battersby, writing that literary criticism had "suffered a great loss". He continued, "All of us owe her a debt of gratitude for her unstinting efforts to bring the best writers from around the world to our attention, her unflinching standards, and for the enthusiasm with which she brought her celebration of all aspects of the arts to so many different audiences." She was survived by her daughter, Nadia, her mother (Elizabeth Whiston), and three siblings. Poet Mary O'Donnell published a poem, "Elegy for a Writer", in remembrance of Battersby.

== Bibliography ==
- Second Readings: From Beckett to Black Beauty, 2010, Liberties Press, ISBN 978-1905483815
- Ordinary Dogs: A Story of Two Lives, 2011, Faber and Faber, ISBN 978-0571277834
- Teethmarks on My Tongue, 2016, Dalkey Archive Press, ISBN 978-1-62897-147-7

== See also ==
- List of Irish Times employees
- List of people who died in traffic collisions
