= Sally Hayden =

Irish journalist

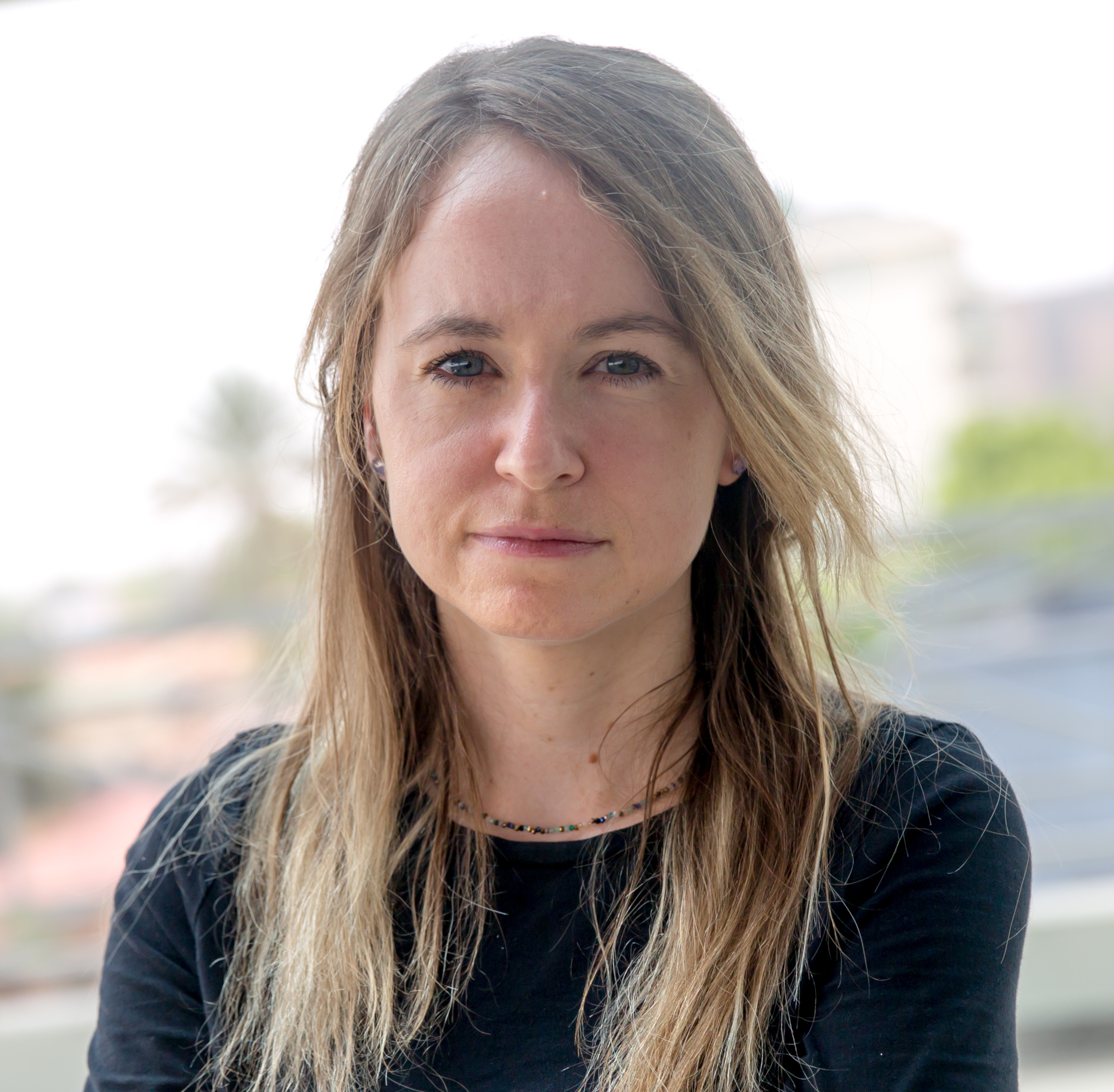
- Hayden in 2024
- Born: 1989 (age 36–37)
- Education: University College Dublin (BCL) Trinity College Dublin (MA)
- Occupation: Journalist

Sally Hayden is an Irish journalist and writer. A foreign correspondent, she has reported from Sudan, Ethiopia, Uganda and Rwanda. Her book My Fourth Time, We Drowned, a nonfiction account of irregular migration to Europe through Libya, was published in 2022 and awarded the Orwell Prize for Political Writing, the 2022 Michel Déon Prize, and the Overall Book of the Year at the 2022 Irish Book Awards. Her second book, This is Also a Love Story: Searching for Good in a Divided World, was published in 2026.

== Early life ==
Hayden obtained a Bachelor of Civil Law degree from University College Dublin in 2012. Hayden also holds a master's degree in international relations from Trinity College Dublin.

== Career ==
Hayden has written for the BBC, TIME, The Guardian, Newsweek, The Washington Post, Al Jazeera, CNN International, NBC News, Channel 4 News, The New York Times, Thomson Reuters Foundation News, Magnum Photos, The Irish Times, The Financial Times, The Daily Telegraph, RTÉ. In 2014, she was staff writer with VICE News.

=== Recognition ===
In 2020, Hayden was awarded the UCD Alumni Award in Law. She was named "Journalist of the Year" in 2023 at the Irish Journalism Awards, "Foreign Coverage Journalist of the Year" in 2019 and 2023, and "Journalist of the Year" at the Irish Journalism Awards in 2025.

=== My Fourth Time, We Drowned ===
Hayden's debut book, My Fourth Time, We Drowned, was published in 2022, documenting irregular migration through Libya from the perspectives of migrants. The book subsequently became available in four other languages (see § Bibliography).

It was distinguished with the Orwell Prize for Political Writing in 2022.

In May 2023, author Max Porter named it as a "Book to Change the World". It was named the Irish Book Awards non-fiction, and overall, book of the year in 2022, and was shortlisted for the 2022 Baillie Gifford Prize.

For International Migrants Day 2022, Kim Yi-Dionne and Laura Seay of The Washington Post named the book among the top three new books to read on the topic.

== Bibliography ==
- My Fourth Time, We Drowned: Seeking Refuge on the World's Deadliest Migration Route. HarperCollins. 2022. ISBN 9780008445577.
  - En de vierde keer zonken we (in Dutch). Translated by van Riemsdijk, Hans. Nieuw Amsterdam. 23 August 2023. ISBN 9789046831243.
  - E la quarta volta siamo annegati (in Italian). Translated by Bertola, Bianca. Bollati Boringhieri. 2023. ISBN 9788833941363.
  - Cuando lo intenté por cuarta vez nos ahogamos (in Spanish). Translated by Pelayo Alonso, Lidia. Capitán Swing. 2024. ISBN 9788412779813.
  - Bienvenue aux enfers (in French). Buchet Chastel. 16 May 2024. ISBN 9782283039458.
  - Za czwartym razem zatonęliśmy (in Polish). Post Factum. 30 October 2024. ISBN 9788382307955.
- This is Also a Love Story: Searching for Good in a Divided World. HarperCollins. 2026. ISBN 978-0-00-862326-5.
