= Paul O'Neill (newspaper editor) =

Irish journalist

Paul O’Neill (1964 or 1965) is an Irish journalist. In April 2017, he succeeded Kevin O'Sullivan as editor of The Irish Times. He held the post until October 2022.

== Journalism career ==
O'Neill's first journalism career was at the Waterford News & Star in 1982; he then worked for the Cork Examiner in 1989.

He joined The Irish Times in 1989 as London Correspondent, before working as a news reporter, Crime Correspondent, Deputy News Editor, and Finance Editor. He served as Deputy Editor of the newspaper under both Geraldine Kennedy and Kevin O'Sullivan. At some point, he briefly left the newspaper to work in public relations.

On 5 April 2017, the Irish Times Trust announced that O'Neill would be replacing O'Sullivan as the newspaper's editor. In October 2022, O'Neill decided to step down as editor and was succeeded by Ruadhán Mac Cormaic.

== Personal life ==
O'Neill was born in either 1964 or 1965, and brought up in Waterford by his parents Paddy and Josie (née Larkin). His father was editor of the Waterford News & Star, while his mother's family owned a bar and grocery store in Enniscorthy, County Wexford.

O'Neill is an avid cyclist, and has written several articles on the subject. He and his wife Jennifer have two daughters.
