= Daily News (Ireland) =

The Daily News was a short-lived Irish tabloid newspaper launched in 1982 by Dublin businessman Hugh McLaughlin, the owner of the Sunday Tribune. The paper proved a financial and critical disaster from its first issue on such a scale that it forced its sister paper, the recently launched Sunday Tribune, which had been building its sales, into liquidation.

Among the complaints levelled against the Daily News were its substandard design, poor printing, poor quality and a concept that had little to offer. However, the paper's extremely poor distribution was the single greatest cause of its demise. Quite frequently, the morning edition was not delivered to newsagents in the capital, Dublin, until 8.00am or after — when its target demographic was already in work. This was crucial — if the 'News' could have breached a critical circulation figure, its undercapitalisation could have been remedied, but advertising revenue failed to roll in and McLaughlin was forced to shut it down.

One big mistake proved to be a decision to put a photograph of the topless wife of businessman John DeLorean on the front page. Used without her permission, the publication of the image enraged feminists, infuriated DeLorean, offended many readers and was of such poor quality that even those who wished to see the picture could not see it clearly. Within days of the débâcle the paper folded.

Its sister paper, the Sunday Tribune, was saved from bankruptcy by journalist Vincent Browne, who bought the title. A decade later, another newly launched sister newspaper of the Tribune, the Dublin Tribune, again forced the financially successful Tribune to the brink of closure and again forced a change in ownership. No-one however bought the rights to the Daily News following its closure in 1982.
