= Irish Journalism Awards =

Annual awards for print journalism in Ireland

- Awarded for: The best in Irish journalism
- Sponsored by: NewsBrands
- Date: November 2024
- Venue: Mansion House
- Country: Ireland
- Presented by: Matt Cooper
- Eligibility: Irish journalists
- First award: 2011
- Final award: 2024

Highlights
- Business Journalist of the Year: Killian Woods
- Campaigning Journalism: Anne Sheridan
- Columnist of the Year (Broadsheet): Mick Clifford
- Foreign Coverage: Hannah McCarthy
- Front Page of the Year: The Irish Sun
- Website: www.irishjournalismawards.ie

The Irish Journalism Awards is an annual award ceremony organised by NewsBrands (formerly National Newspapers of Ireland). Categories include Journalist of the Year, Critic of the Year, News Website, Young Journalist, and Foreign Coverage Journalist.

Recipients of awards have included Fintan O'Toole (Columnist of the Year, 2017, 2018, 2020, 2026), Sally Hayden (Journalist of the Year 2023, Foreign Coverage Journalist of the Year 2019, 2023), Martin Breheny (Sports Story of the Year 2017) and Nicola Tallant (Podcast of the Year 2021).

Awards were not presented from 2013 to 2015.

== 2025 ==
- Sally Hayden, Journalist of the Year, Features Journalist of the Year (Broadsheet), Foreign Coverage
- Rosita Boland, Arts Journalism and Criticism
- Killian Woods, Business Journalist of the Year
- Roisin Ingle, Columnist of the Year (Broadsheet)
- Brenda Power, Columnist of the Year (Popular)
- Michael O'Toole, Crime Journalist of the Year, Scoop of the Year
- Michael O'Farrell, Campaigning Journalism
- The Irish Sun, Front Page of the Year
- The Irish Sun, Headline of the Year
- The Irish Examiner Weekend, Magazine of the Year
- Business Post North Star, Digital Innovation of the Year
- Jenny Friel, Features Journalist of the Year (Popular)
- John Mooney, Political Journalist of the Year, Investigative Journalism
- Ken Foxe, News Reporter of the Year
- Chris Maddaloni, Best Video Journalism
- Connor O'Carrol, Young Journalist of the Year
- John Lee, "From Bomb to Ballot", Podcast of the Year
- Eugene Masterson, Showbiz Journalist of the Year
- Ian O'Riardan, Sportswriter of the Year (Broadsheet)
- Derek Foley, Sportswriter of the Year (Popular)

=== 2024 ===
- Killian Woods, Business Journalist of the Year
- Mark Tighe and Marie Crowe, Journalist of the Year, Investigative Journalism
- Anne Sheridan, Campaigning Journalism
- Mick Clifford, Columnist of the Year (Broadsheet)
- Brenda Power, Columnist of the Year (Popular)
- Conor Gallagher, Crime Journalist of the Year
- Keith Duggan, Arts Journalism and Criticism
- Sally Hayden, Features Journalist of the Year (Broadsheet)
- Debbie McCann, Features Journalist of the Year (Popular)
- Hannah McCarthy, Foreign Coverage
- The Irish Sun, Front Page of the Year
- Irish Daily Star, Headline of the Year
- The Ticket, Magazine of the Year
- Daniel Murray, Political Journalist of the Year
- Donal Lynch, Showbiz Journalist of the Year
- Kitty Holland, News Reporter of the Year
- Paddy Logue, et al. (The Irish Times), Digital Innovation of the Year
- "The Stardust Tragedy" (The Irish Sun), Podcast of the Year
- Níall Feiritear, Scoop of the Year
- Cathal Dennehy, Sportswriter of the Year (Broadsheet)
- Derek Foley, Sportswriter of the Year (Popular)
- Enda O'Dowd, Best Video Journalism
- Eimer Mcauley, Young Journalist of the Year

=== 2023 ===
- Sally Hayden, Journalist of the Year, Foreign Coverage
- Paul Cullen, News Reporter
- Malachy Clerkin, Broadsheet Sportswriter
- Paddy Logue, Digital Innovation
- Enda O'Dowd, Best Use of Video
- Seanín Graham, Broadsheet Features
- Keith Duggan, Arts Journalism and Criticism
- Justine McCarthy, Broadsheet Columnist
- Shauna Bowers, Young Journalist
- Donal MacNamee, Business Journalist
- Mary Carr, Popular Columnist.
- Paul Healy, Crime Journalist,
- Michael O'Farrell, Campaign Journalism
- The Irish Examiner, Front Page
- Irish Daily Star, Headline
- Stephen Milton, Freelance Showbiz Journalist
- Neil O'Riordan, Popular Sportswriter
- John Mooney, Investigative Journalism
- Beau Donnelly, Scoop
- Daniel Murray, Political Journalist of the Year
- Ben Haug, Magazine
- The Irish Sun, Podcast of the Year

=== 2021 ===
The ceremony was held remotely due to the COVID-19 pandemic. The winners for 2021 were:

- Joe Brennan, Business Journalist of the Year
- Irish Examiner, Campaigning Journalism
- Michael O' Toole, Crime Journalist of the Year
- Justine McCarthy, Columnist of the Year (Broadsheet)
- Maeve Quigley, Columnist of the Year (Popular)
- Lara Marlowe, Features Writer (Broadsheet)
- Michael Doyle, Features Writer (Popular)
- Patrick Freyne, Arts Journalism & Criticism
- Marion McKeone, Foreign Coverage
- Irish Examiner, Front Page of the Year
- Irish Daily Star, Headline of the Year
- Mostafa Darwish, Investigative Journalism
- Irish Country Living, Newspaper Magazine of the Year
- Craig Hughes, News Reporter of the Year
- Naomi O'Leary, Political Journalist of the Year
- Aoife Moore and Paul Hosford, Scoop of the Year
- Sandra Mallon, Showbiz Journalist of the Year
- Keith Duggan, Broadsheet Sports Journalist
- Kieran Cunningham, Popular Sports Journalist
- Kathleen Harris, Best Video Journalism
- Nicola Tallant, Podcast of the Year
- Rosanna Cooney, Young Journalist of the Year
- IrishExaminer.com, Digital News Coverage

=== 2020 ===
The winners for 2020 were:

- Lives Lost Team, The Irish Times
- Lorcan Allen, Business Journalist
- The Irish Times, Best Coverage of COVID
- Daniel Kinahan, Campaigning Journalism
- Fintan O'Toole, Columnist of the Year (Broadsheet)
- Linda Maher, Columnist of the Year (Popular)
- John Burns, Critic of the Year
- Patrick O'Connell, Crime Journalist of the Year
- Conor Lally, Features Writer (Broadsheet)
- Maeve Quigley, Features Writer (Popular)
- Marion McKeone, Foreign Coverage
- Irish Examiner (Gay Byrne Tribute), Front Page of the Year
- Irish Mirror (The Parting Glass), Headline of the Year
- Political Team (Irish Independent), Investigative Journalism
- The Irish Times Magazine, Newspaper Magazine of the Year
- Wayne O'Connor, News Reporter of the Year
- The Irish Times (irishtimes.com), News website of the Year
- Inside Politics (The Irish Times), Podcast of the Year
- Miriam Lord, Political Journalist of the Year
- Cormac McQuinn and Fionnán Sheahan, Scoop of the Year
- Johnny Watterson, Sportswriter (Broadsheet)
- Neil O' Riordan, Sportswriter (Popular)
- Ken Sweeney, Showbiz Journalist of the Year
- Enda O'Dowd, Best Use of Video
- Claire Scott, Young Journalist of the Year

=== 2019 ===
The ceremony took place on 14 November 2019. The winners for 2019 were:

- Paddy Clancy, Lifetime Achievement Award
- Mark Tighe, Journalist of the Year
- Hilary Fannin, Columnist (Broadsheet)
- Michael O' Farrell, Business Journalist
- Feargal O' Connor, Business Story
- The Sunday Times, Campaigning Journalism
- Larissa Nolan, Columnist (Popular)
- Nicola Tallant, Crime Journalist
- Norma Costello, Crime Story
- Liam Fay, Critic
- Conor Gallagher, Features (Broadsheet)
- Catherine Fegan, Features (Popular)
- Sally Hayden, Foreign Coverage
- The Irish Examiner, Front Page
- The Irish Sun, Headline
- Colin Coyle, Mark Tighe and Paul Rowan, Investigative Journalism
- Mark Tighe, News Reporter of the Year
- The Floating Voter, Podcast of the Year
- Kevin Doyle, Political Journalist
- Peter O'Dwyer, Political Story
- Eddie Rowley, Showbiz Journalist
- Barry Moran, Showbiz Story
- Mark Tighe, Scoop of the Year
- Cathal Dennehy, Sports Journalist (Broadsheet)
- Roy Curtis, Sports Writer (Popluar)
- Simon Carswell and Enda O' Dowd, Best use of Video
- Irishtimes.com, Best News Website
- Jack Power, Young Journalist

=== 2018 ===
The ceremony took place on 15 November 2018. The winners for 2018 were:

- Rosita Boland, Journalist of the Year
- Tom Lyons, Business Journalist
- Mark Paul and Colm Keena, Business Story
- Charlie Weston, Campaigning Journalism
- Philip Nolan, Columnist (Popular)
- Fintan O' Toole, Columnist (Broadsheet)
- Stephen Breen, Crime Journalist
- Michael O'Toole, Crime Story
- Richard Pine, Critic of the Year
- Irish Farmers Journal, Digital Excellence
- Conor Lally, Features (Broadsheet)
- Aoife Finneran, Features (Popular)
- Sally Hayden, Foreign coverage
- Irish Daily Mail, Front Page
- Irish Daily Star, Headline
- Maeve Sheehan, Wayne O'Connor and Mark O'Regan, Investigative Journalism
- Susan Mitchell, News Analysis
- Fiach Kelly, Political Journalist
- Ellen Coyne, Political Story
- Mark Tighe, News Reporter
- Rosita Boland, Scoop of the Year
- Jennifer O' Brien and Catherine Sanz, Showbiz Story
- Barry Egan, Showbiz Journalist
- Vincent Hogan, Sports Story
- Vincent Hogan, Sports Writer (Broadsheet)
- David Coughlan, Sports Writer (Popluar)
- Amy Molloy, Young Journalist of the Year

=== 2017 ===
- Catherine Fegan, Journalist of the Year
- Jack Horgan-Jones, Business Journalist of the Year
- John Meagher, Business Story of the Year
- Fintan O'Toole, Columnist of the Year (Broadsheet)
- Michael O'Toole, Crime Journalist of the Year and Crime Story of the Year
- Patrick Freyne, Critic of the Year
- The Irish Times Abroad and Ciara Kenny, Digital Excellence
- Conor Lally, Features Journalist of the Year (Broadsheet)
- Ruadhán Mac Cormaic, Foreign Coverage
- Irish Daily Mirror, Front Page of the Year
- Irish Daily Star, Headline of the Year
- Michael O'Farrell, Investigative Journalism
- Daniel McConnell and Fiachra Ó Cionnaith, News Analysis
- Conor Feehan, News Reporter of the Year
- John Lee, Political Journalist of the Year
- Ellen Coyne, Political Story of the Year
- Sorcha Crowley and Sligo Champion, Local Ireland Regional Journalist of the Year
- David Labanyi, Scoop of the Year
- Martin Breheny, Sports Story of the Year
- Malachy Clerkin, Sports Journalist of the Year
- Ken Sweeney, Showbiz Journalist of the Year
- Nadine O' Regan, Showbiz Story of the Year
- Niall O' Connor, Young Journalist of the Year

=== 2016 ===
The winners for 2016 were:

- Michael Clifford, Journalist, Broadsheet Columnist
- Ken Sweeney, Showbiz Journalist
- The Irish Sun, Headline
- Tom Lyons, Business Journalist
- Fearghal O'Connor, Business Story
- Paddy Murray, Popular Columnist
- Nicola Tallant, Crime Journalist
- Alan Sherry, Crime Story
- Patrick Freyne, Critic
- The Irish Times, Digital Innovation
- Catherine Fegan, Popular Feature Writer
- Susan Mitchell, Broadsheet Feature Writer
- Jason O'Brien, Foreign Coverage
- The Herald, Front Page
- Peter Murtagh, Investigative Journalist
- Rosita Boland, News Analysis
- Patrick O'Connell, News Reporter
- Jody Corcoran, Political Journalist
- Niamh Horan, Political Story
- Maeve Quigley, Showbiz Stor
- Vincent Hogan, Sports Story
- Neil Francis, Sports Writer
- Sunday World, Scoop of the Year
- Sean Dunne, Young Journalist

=== 2013 ===
- Kitty Holland, Journalist of the Year
- Ian Kehoe, Business Journalist of the Year
- Paul Howard, Columnist of the Year
- David Walsh (The Lance Armstrong Doping Scandal), Campaign of the Year
- Mick McCaffery, Crime Journalist of the Year
- Fintan O'Toole, Critic of the Year
- Sunday World, Design and Presentation
- independent.ie, Digital Excellence
- Eoin Butler, Features of the Year
- Jason O'Brien, Foreign Coverage
- Deja Voodoo (Western People), Headline of the Year
- Michael O'Farrell, News Analysis of the Year
- Kitty Holland, News Reporter of the Year
- Young Irish Writing (The Irish Times), Newspapers in Education (NiE)
- Fiach Kelly, Political Journalist
- Anthony Hennigan, Local Ireland Regional Journalist of the Year
- Paul Williams, Scoop of the Year
- Roy Curtis, Sports Reporter of the Year
- Neil Francis, Sports Columnist of the Year
- Barry Egan, Showbiz Journalist of the Year
- Elaine O'Loughlin, Young Journalist of the Year

=== 2012 ===
- Michael Brennan, Fiach Kelly, Cormac McQuinn and Fionnan Sheahan, Journalist of the Year
- Ian Kehoe, Business Journalist of the Year
- Justine McCarthy, The Sunday Times (columnist),
- Dermot Bolger, Irish Daily Mail (commentator), Columnist of the Year
- Nicola Tallant, Crime Journalist of the Year
- Eileen Battersby, Critic of the Year
- Irish Daily Mail, Design and Presentation
- Philip Nolan, Features of the Year
- Tiocfaith Ar Lamh (Irish Daily Star), Headline of the Year
- Titanic Supplement (Irish Independent), Newspapers in Education (NiE)
- Miriam Lord, Political Journalist
- Marisa Reidy, Local Ireland Regional Journalist of the Year
- Michael O'Farrell, Scoop of the Year
- Ewan McKenna, Sports Reporter of the Year
- Eamonn Sweeney, Sports Columnist of the Year
- Alexandra Ryan, Showbiz Journalist of the Year
- Jennifer Bray, Young Journalist of the Year

=== 2011 ===
- Simon Carswell, Journalist of the Year
- Tom Lyons and Brian Carey, Business Journalist of the Year
- Martina Devlin, Columnist of the Year
- Patrick Freyne, Critic of the Year
- Irish Examiner, Design and Presentation
- Kathy Sheridan, Features of the Year
- TY People (People Newspapers), Newspapers in Education (NiE)
- Miriam Lord, Political Journalist
- Colette Browne and Wexford Echo, Local Ireland Regional Journalist of the Year
- Senan Molony, Scoop of the Year
- Keiran Shannon, Sports Columnist of the Year
- Jennifer O'Brien, Showbiz Journalist of the Year
- Fiach Kelly, Young Journalist of the Year
