= Jim Carroll (journalist) =

Irish music journalist

- Born: 1968 (age 57–58); Tipperary, Ireland
- Other name: On the Record
- Occupation: Music journalist
- Notable credit(s): Founder and editor of Muse; Co-founder of the Choice Music Prize
- Website: http://www.irishtimes.com/blogs/ontherecord/

Jim Carroll (born Tipperary in 1968) is an Irish music journalist, blogger and editor who is currently employed by The Irish Times. He runs a blog titled "On the Record" for the newspaper.

Carroll is a co-founder of the Choice Music Prize, an annual music award given to one Irish album from ten nominations. He also has a radio programme on Dublin's Phantom FM. In 1997 he founded the internet music magazine Muse.

== Views ==
Carroll uses his "On the Record" blog to air his views. In October 2006, Irish Independent journalist Anne-Marie Walsh reported that his views on the Humanzi album as "the most expensive and embarrassing flop of 2006" contrasted greatly with NME's report that the band were "the biggest new act in the country " and that their success "has stopped Dublin in its tracks". His views have also been mentioned by the BBC.

In 2005, the Irish Examiner included Carroll on a list of "those who called the tune in Irish music" that year, saying his column "remains one of the most influential on music".

== Journalism ==
Carroll founded and began editing internet music magazine Muse in 1997. It was subsequently purchased by Irish telco Eircom.

He joined The Irish Times in November 2000.

On 27 January 2009, Carroll reported for The Irish Times on the leaking a day early of the nominees list for the 2009 Meteor Awards.

Alongside his musical colleagues with The Irish Times, Tony Clayton-Lea and Sinéad Gleeson, Carroll opted to sit a Christmas music examination in Popular Music and Music Management at the Institute of Art and Design in Dún Laoghaire on 11 December 2009. He obtained a score of 79 per cent, higher than his colleagues who obtained scores of 71 per cent and 73 per cent respectively. Carroll wrote essays on hip-hop, U2 and the Electric Picnic. The marker noted: "outstanding depth of analysis. Impressive breadth of knowledge. Outstanding use of references and fluency of use. Comprehensive. Master’s level work in that it adds to the body of knowledge on the topic. Very strong critical analysis of U2.com. Watch for tiny details which may read in a confusing manner".

In March 2010, Carroll won an Irish Blog Award in the Best Blog from a Journalist category. He won this same award for a second year in a row in March 2011.

== Choice Music Prize ==
In 2005, Carroll co-founded the Choice Music Prize alongside Dave Reid. The prize is known in the Irish media for its tendency to come to "some pretty eccentric decisions". Carroll and Reid continue to co-ordinate the annual event. Carroll announces the winner. The first winner, Julie Feeney, was given a global record deal with Sony after receiving the award.

Within four years Carroll commented:

Our titchy little maverick event has morphed into an event that is prominent on the musical scene.

Carroll stepped down from the project after the 2010 Live Event.

== Music business, radio and DJing ==
Carroll previously reviewed music for a number of different radio shows include Today FM's Pet Sounds and RTÉ Radio 1 arts programme Rattlebag.

He had a radio programme called The Far Side on Phantom FM. He DJed alongside colleague Sinéad Ní Mhorda at Grand Canal Square as part of the Dublin Dance Festival, a free event, on 19 April 2008.

Before concentrating on journalism and broadcasting, Carroll worked in the music business where he co-founded the Lakota record label, worked in A&R for several UK labels (including Go! Discs, Warner Music and Dedicated Records) and worked as a press officer for London Records.

== See also ==
- List of Irish Times employees
