= Eir Spiders =

The Spider Awards
- Awarded for: "Driving digital excellence"
- Country: Ireland (Republic of Ireland and Northern Ireland)
- First award: 1996; 30 years ago
- Website: thespiders.ie

The Spider Awards (previously known as the Golden Spider Awards and for sponsorship reasons as the Eircom Spiders and later the Eir Spiders) is an annual awards ceremony for Irish contributions to online and digital media across a number of categories.

Established in 1996, the awards are hosted by Business & Finance and historically sponsored by telecommunications company Eir (formerly known as Eircom).

A parallel set of awards for young people aged 19 and under, known as the "Junior Spiders", was established in 2009.

Since 2018 the awards have reputedly come "under the umbrella" of the Dublin Tech Summit conference.
