= We Don't Know Ourselves =

2021 nonfiction book by Fintan O'Toole

We Don't Know Ourselves: A Personal History of Ireland Since 1958
- First edition cover
- Author: Fintan O’Toole
- Language: English
- Genre: History, essay, memoir
- Publisher: Head of Zeus (UK), Liveright (U.S.)
- Publication date: 2021
- Publication place: Ireland
- Media type: Print (hardcover and paperback)
- Pages: 624
- ISBN: 978-1784978297

We Don't Know Ourselves: A Personal History of Ireland Since 1958 (published with the subtitle A Personal History of Modern Ireland in the United States) is a book by Irish journalist and critic Fintan O’Toole published in 2021. The book combines aspects of history, memoir, reporting, political commentary and criticism to present a portrait of Ireland from 1958 to the present day.

== Synopsis ==
While We Don't Know Ourselves does not constitute a comprehensive history of Ireland since 1958, it analyzes a wide array of significant events and trends in modern Irish history, several of which O'Toole ties to his own experiences living in Ireland. Subjects discussed include the economic modernization reforms led by Taoiseach Seán Lemass in the 1950s and 1960s, emigration to Britain and the United States, Ireland's entry into the European Economic Community in 1973, Catholicism's significant influence on Irish society and politics, the Troubles in Northern Ireland, the public debates on contraception and abortion, Ireland's emergence as a tax haven, the Catholic Church sexual abuse scandals in the 1990s and 2000s, the Celtic Tiger economic era, the subsequent banking crisis, and the successful referendum campaigns to legalize same-sex marriage in 2015 and abortion in 2018.

== Reception ==
We Don't Know Ourselves was a No. 1 Irish Times bestseller.

It received positive reviews in the Irish Times, The Guardian, The Atlantic, New York Times, Times Literary Supplement, and the Financial Times.

The Times Literary Supplement describes the book as "masterly, fascinating and frequently horrifying".

It was selected as one of The New York Times's "10 Best Books of 2022" list.

== Awards ==
The book won the 2021 Book of the Year award at the Irish Book Awards.
