= Kevin O'Sullivan (journalist) =

Irish newspaper editor

Kevin O'Sullivan (born c. 1960) is an Irish journalist. He was the editor of The Irish Times from 2011 to 2017. He was the thirteenth editor of the paper, succeeding Geraldine Kennedy on 23 June 2011, and succeeded in turn by Paul O'Neill on 5 April 2017. He is not the presenter of the same name on Talk.

== Early life and education ==
O'Sullivan comes from Tramore, County Waterford. He holds a BSc from University College Dublin, having graduated in 1981, and earned a Diploma in Journalism from Dublin City University in 1983.

== Career ==
O'Sullivan worked for the Connacht Tribune and the Tuam Herald, before moving to The Irish Times in 1997. At the Times, he worked as a journalist, night editor, an editor for special projects and a health supplement, and the environmental matters and food science correspondent. He became news editor in 2006.

== Personal life ==
O'Sullivan is married, to Ger O'Sullivan, with three children.
