= Geraldine Kennedy =

Irish journalist and politician (born 1951)

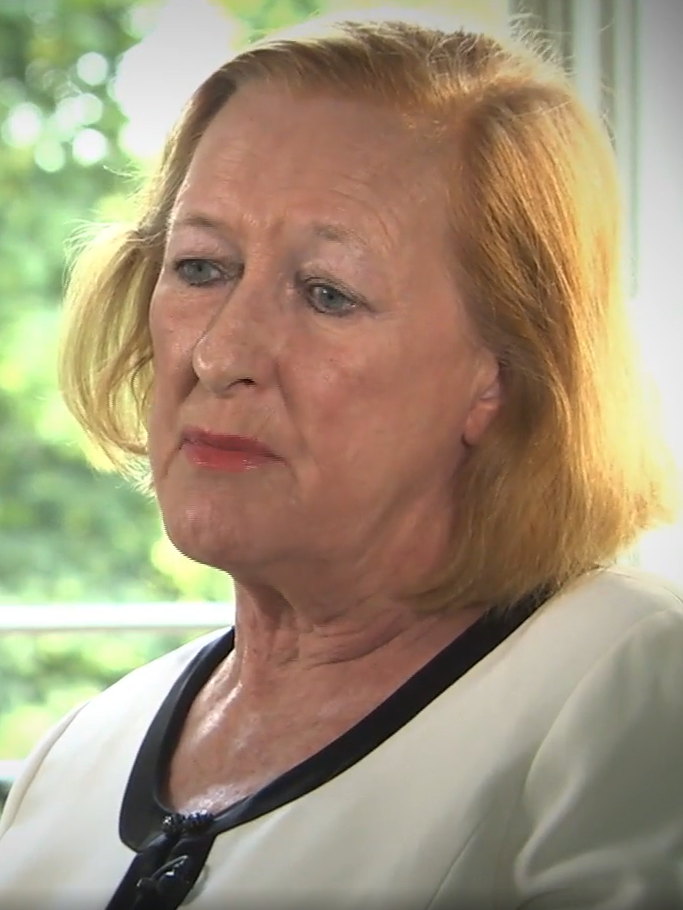
- Kennedy in 2015

Teachta Dála
- In office February 1987 – June 1989
- Constituency: Dún Laoghaire

Personal details
- Born: 1 September 1951 (age 74) Tramore, County Waterford, Ireland
- Party: Progressive Democrats (1985–1989)
- Spouse: David Hegarty (m. 1983)
- Children: 2
- Education: Dublin Institute of Technology

Geraldine Kennedy (born 1 September 1951) is an Irish journalist and politician who served as the first female editor of The Irish Times newspaper. She previously served as a Teachta Dála (TD) for the Dún Laoghaire constituency from 1987 to 1989.

In 1982, Kennedy's telephone, along with those of two other journalists, was tapped by the Minister for Justice, Seán Doherty. The revelation in 1992 that Charles Haughey had ordered the phone taps led to Haughey's resignation as Taoiseach.

== Early career ==
Kennedy studied at Dublin Institute of Technology and began her journalistic career with a regional newspaper, the Munster Express. She moved to the Cork Examiner after less than a year, but spent only a few years there before joining The Irish Times.

On the foundation of the Sunday Tribune in 1980, Kennedy joined as the paper's political correspondent. The paper's publisher, John Mulcahy, had become familiar with Kennedy when she had contributed to his journal Hibernia. When the Tribune briefly ceased production, Kennedy moved to the Sunday Press.

Early in 1987, Kennedy successfully sued the incumbent Charles Haughey-led Fianna Fáil government for illegally tapping her phone.

== Political career ==
Kennedy stood in the 1987 general election as a candidate for the newly formed Progressive Democrat party in Dún Laoghaire. She came third in the poll, winning 9.4% of the first-preference vote. She was one of fourteen Progressive Democrat TDs elected to Dáil Éireann in that election — the greatest number of seats the party was to win. Kennedy was appointed the party's spokesperson for foreign affairs.

She stood again in the 1989 general election and won 9% of the first-preference vote but failed to retain her seat.

== Return to journalism ==
Following her election defeat, Kennedy returned to The Irish Times, then edited by Conor Brady, whom she had worked with at the Tribune when he was the editor. She avoided party-political journalism for several years, but she returned to covering politics in the early 1990s, and became The Irish Times' political editor in 1999. She became the newspaper's first female editor upon the departure of Conor Brady in late 2002. One of her rivals for the editor's chair was the paper's high-profile columnist, Fintan O'Toole.

Kennedy was paid more than the editor of Britain's top non-tabloid newspaper The Daily Telegraph, which has a circulation of about nine times that of The Irish Times. Later columnist Fintan O'Toole told the Sunday Independent: "We as a paper are not shy of preaching about corporate pay and fat cats but with this there is a sense of excess. Some of the sums mentioned are disturbing. This is not an attack on Ms Kennedy, it is an attack on the executive level of pay. There is double-standard of seeking more job cuts while paying these vast salaries."

In September 2006, Kennedy approved the publication of an article in The Irish Times giving confidential details of investigations being made into payments purported to have been made in 1993 to Taoiseach Bertie Ahern. Kennedy refused, upon request of the investigating Tribunal, to provide details of the source of the printed information. She responded that the documents had since been destroyed. Her refusal caused the Tribunal to seek High Court orders compelling her to provide details of the source. On 23 October 2007, the High Court granted the orders compelling her to go before the Tribunal and answer all questions. In its judgment, the High Court, criticising her decision to destroy the documents, said it was an "astounding and flagrant disregard of the rule of law". In 2009, however, the Supreme Court overturned this ruling, holding that the High Court had not struck the correct balance between the journalists’ right to protect their source and the tribunal's right to confidentiality.

Kennedy announced on 12 March 2011 her intention to retire from The Irish Times by September, after a nine-year term as editor. She actually retired in June, and was succeeded by news editor, Kevin O'Sullivan, who succeeded her as editor on 23 June 2011.

In August 2012, she was appointed adjunct professor of journalism at the University of Limerick. She has been awarded five honorary doctorates from Irish universities.

Dáil	Election	Deputy (Party)	Deputy (Party)	Deputy (Party)	Deputy (Party)	Deputy (Party)
21st	1977	David Andrews (FF)	Liam Cosgrave (FG)	Barry Desmond (Lab)	Martin O'Donoghue (FF)	4 seats 1977–1981
22nd	1981	David Andrews (FF)	Liam T. Cosgrave (FG)	Barry Desmond (Lab)	Martin O'Donoghue (FF)	Seán Barrett (FG)
23rd	1982 (Feb)	David Andrews (FF)	Liam T. Cosgrave (FG)	Barry Desmond (Lab)	Martin O'Donoghue (FF)	Seán Barrett (FG)
24th	1982 (Nov)	David Andrews (FF)	Liam T. Cosgrave (FG)	Barry Desmond (Lab)	Monica Barnes (FG)	Seán Barrett (FG)
25th	1987	David Andrews (FF)	Geraldine Kennedy (PDs)	Barry Desmond (Lab)	Monica Barnes (FG)	Seán Barrett (FG)
26th	1989	David Andrews (FF)	Brian Hillery (FF)	Eamon Gilmore (WP)	Monica Barnes (FG)	Seán Barrett (FG)
27th	1992	David Andrews (FF)	Helen Keogh (PDs)	Eamon Gilmore (DL)	Niamh Bhreathnach (Lab)	Seán Barrett (FG)
28th	1997	David Andrews (FF)	Monica Barnes (FG)	Eamon Gilmore (Lab)	Mary Hanafin (FF)	Seán Barrett (FG)
29th	2002	Barry Andrews (FF)	Fiona O'Malley (PDs)	Eamon Gilmore (Lab)	Mary Hanafin (FF)	Ciarán Cuffe (GP)
30th	2007	Barry Andrews (FF)	Seán Barrett (Note: Served as Ceann Comhairle in the 31st Dáil from 2011 to 2016 and was returned automatically at the 2016 general election.) (FG)	Eamon Gilmore (Lab)	Mary Hanafin (FF)	Ciarán Cuffe (GP)
31st	2011	Mary Mitchell O'Connor (FG)	Seán Barrett (FG)	Eamon Gilmore (Lab)	Richard Boyd Barrett (PBP)	4 seats from 2011
32nd	2016	Mary Mitchell O'Connor (FG)	Seán Barrett (FG)	Maria Bailey (FG)	Richard Boyd Barrett (AAA–PBP)	4 seats from 2011
33rd	2020	Jennifer Carroll MacNeill (FG)	Ossian Smyth (GP)	Cormac Devlin (FF)	Richard Boyd Barrett (S–PBP)	4 seats from 2011
34th	2024	Jennifer Carroll MacNeill (FG)	Barry Ward (FG)	Cormac Devlin (FF)	Richard Boyd Barrett (PBP–S)	4 seats from 2011
