= Sunday World =

Irish newspaper

- Type: Sunday newspaper
- Format: Tabloid
- Owner(s): Mediahuis Ireland, a subsidiary of Mediahuis
- Editor: Brian Farrell
- Founded: 1973
- Headquarters: Talbot Street, Dublin
- Circulation: 75,000
- Website: sundayworld.com

The Sunday World is an Irish newspaper published by Mediahuis Ireland, a subsidiary of Mediahuis. It is the second largest selling "popular" newspaper in the Republic of Ireland, and is also sold in Northern Ireland where a modified edition with more stories relevant to that region is produced. It was first published on 25 March 1973. Until 25 December 1988 all editions were printed in Dublin but since 1 January 1989 a Northern Ireland edition has been published and an English edition has been printed in London since March 1992.

== Origins ==
The Sunday World was Ireland's first tabloid newspaper. Hugh McLaughlin and Gerry McGuinness launched it on 25 March 1973. It broke new ground in layout, content, agenda, columnists and use of sexual imagery.

In 1976 and 1982 it was the only newspaper in the country published on Saint Stephen's Day.

The title also publishes a separate Northern Ireland newspaper edition.

It is owned by Independent News & Media, a subsidiary of Mediahuis.

== Developments ==
In 2012, a voluntary redundancy scheme was put in place, which was oversubscribed. In early 2013, it was announced that the Irish Daily Star and the Sunday World would start to share some functions.

In 2014, another redundancy scheme was announced. The redundancy scheme was due to the sharing of functions with the Evening Herald.

In March 2017, it was announced that INM are merging the Sunday World and The Herald newsrooms. Later in 2017, INM announced that they were closing the Sunday World website.

Issues from 14 June 1987 to 2006 are online at the British Newspaper Archive, Newspaper.com has issues (2002-now) and 2018 to date on the Irish News Archives.

== Investigative journalism ==
In 2001, a journalist working for the paper in Northern Ireland, Martin O'Hagan, was killed by Loyalist paramilitaries in Lurgan, Co Armagh. O'Hagan was the first journalist to draw attention to the activities of Billy Wright. Wright lived only a few miles from O'Hagan in north Armagh, and had attempted to have the journalist murdered in 1992. The threat was sufficient to cause O'Hagan to temporarily move to the Sunday World office in Dublin, and then to Cork. He continued working for the newspaper, returning to his family in Lurgan in the late 1990s. When killed, O'Hagan became the first reporter covering the Northern Ireland conflict to be killed by paramilitaries.

In 2005 the paper was sued by a well known Dublin criminal figure Martin "the Viper" Foley after it reported that he was a leading figure in gang related crime and had links with the IRA elements. Foley argued that the report placed his life in jeopardy and sought to gag the paper. The attempt failed as the High Court rejected his allegations and refused to prevent further reporting.

In 2010 the paper won a landmark legal ruling when a privacy and defamation case taken by Ruth Hickey was dismissed by the President of the High Court Mr Justice Nicholas Kearns. The ruling copperfastened the importance of freedom of expression in Irish law and stated that it can only be outweighed by the right to privacy in limited circumstances. Mr Justice Kearns also defended the right of the newspaper to publish information that was clearly in the public domain on the internet (in this case the infamous "zip up your mickey" telephone voicemail rant by Twink whose husband had left her for Ms Hickey).

On 19 March 2006, Sunday World reporter Hugh Jordan tracked down former Sinn Féin official and MI5 and PSNI informant Denis Donaldson at a remote, rustic cottage in County Donegal. Sixteen days later, Donaldson was murdered there, and the paper was heavily criticised for identifying and showing a photo of the location. In 2009 the Real IRA claimed responsibility for the killing.

On 1 November 2009, Northern Editor Jim McDowell attracted complaints to the Press Complaints Commission after the paper published on the front page the photograph of a man hanging from a bridge, having killed himself under the headline "Halloween Horror". McDowell claimed on Stephen Nolan's BBC Radio Ulster show on 2 November that it was meant to dissuade individuals thinking about suicide but the decision to publish was condemned by suicide awareness and support groups.

== Awards ==
In 2008, the newspaper won the prize for the Newspaper of the Year (Sunday) at the annual Chartered Institute of Public Relations Press and Broadcast Awards for Northern Ireland. The Sunday World Investigations Editor Nicola Tallant was named the Crime Reporter of the Year by the National Newspapers of Ireland three times, in 2012, 2016 and 2019.

In 2016, The Sunday World won the prize for 'Scoop of the year' at the Newsbrands Ireland Journalist of the Year awards for its exclusive coverage of the Regency Hotel gangland murder.

Paddy Murray - Columnist of the Year (Popular) - 2016

Pat O'Connell – News reporter of the year – 2016

Eddie Rowley – Showbiz journalist of the year – 2019

Nicola Tallant – Crime journalist of the year – 2012,2016, 2019

Roy Curtis – Sport journalist of the year – 2013, 2019

Alan Sherry – Crime story of the year – 2016

== Circulation ==
Year (period)	Average circulation per issue
1999 (January to June)	308,848
2000	311,000
2008 (July to December)	285,214
2009 (July to December)	270,453
2011 (January to December)	250,667
2013 (July to December)	208,281
2015 (January to June)	178,867
2015 (July to December)	175,060
2016 (January to June)	162,938
2016 (July to December)	149,652
2017 (January to June)	143,503
2017 (July to December)	133,946
2018 (January to June)	130,083
2018 (July to December)	123,095
2023 (March)	75,000
