= Miriam Lord =

Irish journalist

- Born: 1962 (age 63–64); Dublin, Ireland
- Occupation: Journalist
- Writing career
- Genres: Non-fiction, political commentary

Miriam Lord (born 1962) is an Irish journalist and political sketch writer employed by The Irish Times newspaper. Her work for the paper includes daily coverage of major political matters through her Dáil Sketch, and Miriam Lord's Week which reviews the weeks political events published in the Saturday edition of the paper.

== Career ==
Miriam Lord was educated at King's Inns Street Secondary School (now Mount Carmel) and went on to study journalism at the College of Commerce in Rathmines. She had earlier previously worked for the Drogheda Independent newspaper and for The Irish Times's rival broadsheet, the Irish Independent.

In October 2011, Lord won a 'Best political journalist award' at the National Newspapers of Ireland's Journalism Awards. She did it again in the following year. The judges said about her: "Never less than forensic in detail, engaging in language, courageous, outspoken and laved with wit, this journalist continues to excel."

A 2015 article on Ursula Halligan's public acknowledgement of her sexual orientation was well received.
