= Dublin Tech Summit =

Technology conference in Dublin, Ireland

- Genre: Technology
- Frequency: Annual
- Venue: RDS Dublin
- Location: Dublin
- Country: Ireland
- Inaugurated: February 2017
- Founders: Ian Hyland, Ben English
- Attendance: 8,000+
- Website: dublintechsummit.tech

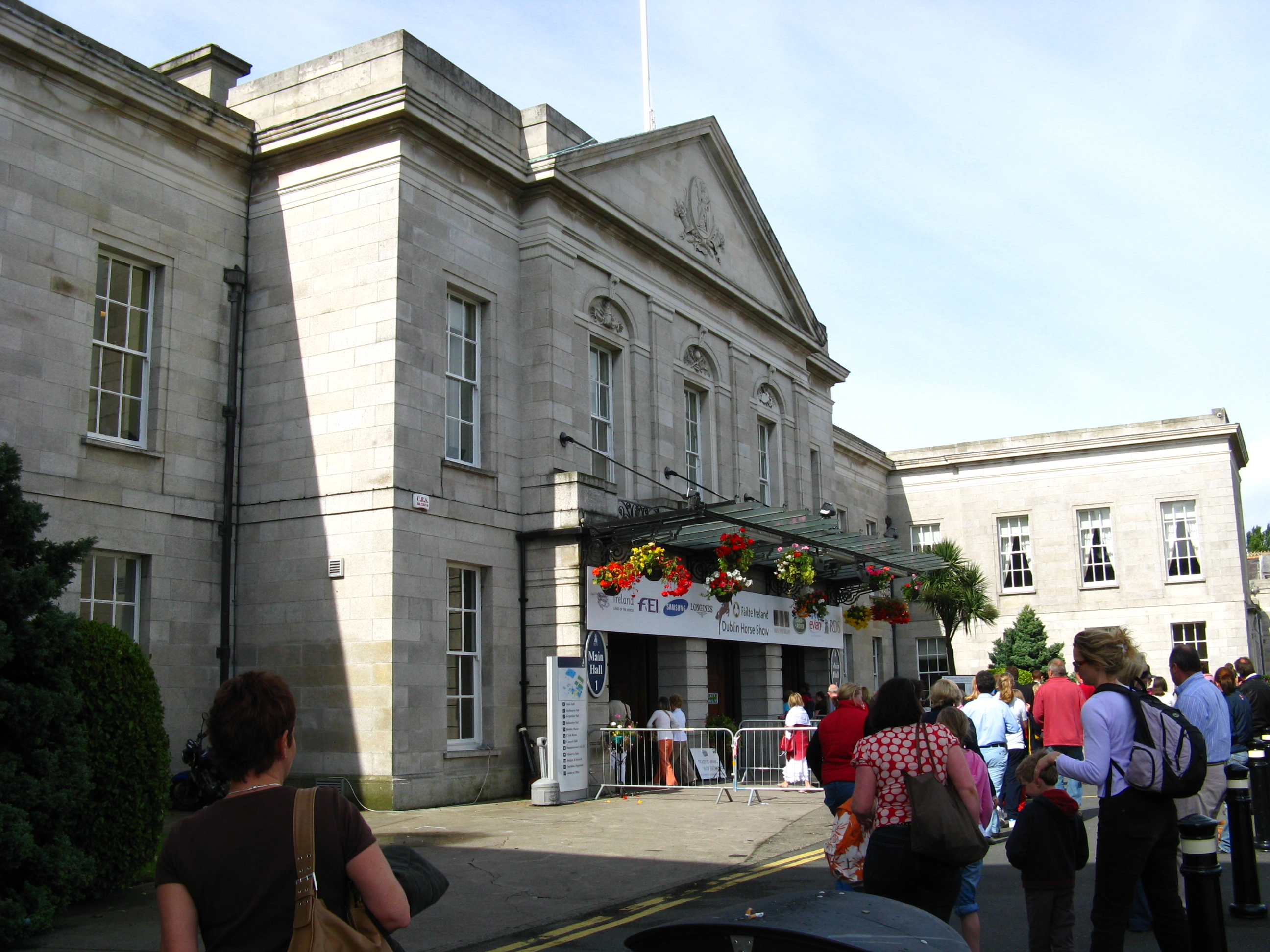
The RDS Dublin hosted the 2019 Dublin Tech Summit

The Dublin Tech Summit rebrand launched in January 2025

The Dublin Tech Summit (DTS) is an international technology conference held in Dublin, Ireland. The first summit took place on 15 and 16 February 2017, at the Convention Centre Dublin in the city's Silicon Docks area.

Irish telecom firm Eir (Eircom Limited) was a founding partner of the Dublin Tech Summit and a lead sponsor.

The event is one of many vying to fill the void left by the controversial departure of the Web Summit to Lisbon, Portugal after 2016. It bills itself as one of Europe's "fastest growing international tech conferences".

The Dublin Tech Summit aims to run annually and attract over 10,000 attendees. It is reputedly focused on attracting speakers, startups, exhibitors, sponsors, and investors, covering a number of themes, including: emerging technologies, machine learning, space exploration, "Tech for Good", "Diversity in Tech", big data and analytics.

In its inaugural event, two-thirds of the 10,000 attendees came from outside Ireland, and 48% were female, with DTS reportedly attempting to encourage attendance from under-represented groups in the tech industry.

DTS19, the 2019 event, took place in Dublin's RDS Arena from 10 April to 11 April 2019. In 2020, during the COVID-19 pandemic, the organisers held a virtual summit event.
