= The Phoenix (magazine) =

Political and current affairs magazine in Ireland

- January 2020 cover
- Type: Magazine
- Format: Current affairs Satire
- Owner: Penfield Enterprises Ltd.
- Founder: John Mulcahy
- Editor: Paddy Prendeville
- Founded: 1983
- Ceased publication: June 15, 2026
- Headquarters: 44 Lower Baggot Street; Dublin 2 Ireland
- ISSN: 0790-0562
- Website: www.thephoenix.ie

The Phoenix was an Irish political and current affairs magazine, established in 1983 by John Mulcahy. Sometimes compared to the British magazine Private Eye, the magazine was edited by Paddy Prendeville from 1984 to 2026. The publication was generally published fortnightly, with a larger annual issue each December. The Phoenix has produced "a fortnightly diet of humour, financial analysis, and news with an insider slant from the worlds of security, politics, media, arts, and law." It was announced in June 2026 that the magazine would be closing down after 43 years.

== History and operations ==
The magazine was launched in January 1983. It was established by journalist and publisher John Mulcahy, who had previously run the Sunday Tribune newspaper, which first collapsed financially in 1982, and the Irish republican political magazine Hibernia, which ceased publishing in 1980 after a libel action. The name Phoenix was a reference to its "emergence from the ashes" of these two publications. Mulcahy, the original "Goldhawk", intended the magazine to publish inside stories that mainstream outlets would not print.

Published by a company named Penfield Enterprises Ltd., and based on Baggot Street, the magazine had an ABC-audited circulation of 19,014 for 2004 and 18,268 in 2007. It has been described as having "played a pivotal role in investigative journalism in Ireland". Among the magazine's notable stories were a 1996 report that Charles Haughey had received more than £1 million from supermarket tycoon Ben Dunne, and coverage of the Telecom Éireann scandal in 1991, which contributed to the resignation of Michael Smurfit as chairman of that company. In December 2008, the magazine reported that Anglo Irish Bank was "technically bankrupt", prompting legal threats from the bank's solicitors demanding withdrawal of all copies from shops; Anglo Irish Bank was nationalised the following month.

Mulcahy oversaw the magazine's operations until 2007.

In 2026, it was announced that the magazine would cease publication and the company behind it would go into liquidation. The NUJ described the closure as "another blow to media plurality in Ireland". In June 2026, former Phoenix contributor Pat Leahy published a retrospective on the Phoenix. In his article, Leahy argued that the Phoenix did not primarily fail because it struggled to adapt to the internet, but because it gradually lost the distinctive insider journalism that had made it essential reading. In Leahy's view, the magazine published fewer exclusive revelations, became more focused on opinion, and operated in an Ireland where political corruption had declined since the tribunal era, reducing demand for the kind of investigative reporting on which its reputation had been built.

== Layout and style ==
Features in the magazine included a news column; detailed profiles ("Pillars of Society" and "The Young Bloods"); "Affairs of the Nation", which looked at political scandals; "Bog Cuttings" which consisted of humorous and unusual events outside Dublin (often bizarre court cases), "Hush Hush" and "On the beat", which dealt with security and intelligence matters; and a satirical section, "Craic and Codology". It also had an extensive financial column, "Moneybags".

Like Private Eye, the cover featured a photo montage with a speech bubble, putting ironic or humorous comments into the mouths of the famous in response to topical events. Other features included an "Apology" section (where the magazine offered an ersatz apology for the failings or success of some person or event), "That Menu in Full", the use of ("That's enough of this. -Ed" type interjections) and their derivatives, and the Christmas Gift lists, where implausible gifts with ridiculous features were offered for sale.

In contrast to Private Eye, the Phoenix was printed on magazine stock rather than newsprint, and used colour, including photography, quite extensively.

== Positions ==
In the 1980s, the Workers' Party was a frequent target of satire and investigation over its funding methods, which resulted in Phoenix founder John Mulcahy receiving threats from the Official IRA.

In the late 2000s, it was highly critical of the Corrib gas pipeline and supported the Shell to Sea and Pobal Chill Chomáin campaigns against the laying of the pipeline. It published a supplementary summary and commentary on the Goldstone Report on the siege of Gaza and attacked the actions of the Israeli government over the illegal use of Irish passports in the assassination of Mahmoud al-Mabhouh, and the 2010 Gaza flotilla raid. The magazine was highly critical of the 2007–2011 Fianna Fáil–Green Party coalition. It called for the 2011 Irish budget to be defeated and pointed out that the money loaned as part of the EU stability fund would come at the cost of a crippling rate of interest.

During the 2022 Russian invasion of Ukraine, The Phoenix was highly critical of Ukraine, and accused the Irish media of seeking to undermine Irish neutrality by exploiting "Ukrainian misery".

== See also ==
- Magill
- Waterford Whispers News
- Private Eye
- Village (magazine)
- The Ditch
- The Hibernia Magazine
