= Conor Brady =

Irish newspaper editor, academic and novelist

Conor Brady is an Irish journalist, novelist and academic. He was the editor of The Irish Times between 1986 and 2002.

== Early life ==
Brady was born in Dublin and spent his early childhood in Tullamore in County Offaly, Ireland. He received his primary education at St. Columba's Christian Brothers College, in Tullamore; his secondary education was at the Cistercian College, Roscrea in County Tipperary. At University College Dublin (UCD) he took primary and postgraduate degrees in history and politics. While at UCD he also edited Campus UCD News, one of the college's two newspapers.

== Press career ==
He was the editor of the Sunday Tribune and worked both on radio and television with RTE before assuming the Editorship of the prestigious The Irish Times in 1986. He joined The Irish Times as a trainee journalist, on graduation from UCD where he had been editor of "Campus," the college newspaper. He worked for the newspaper in its Dublin, Belfast and London offices and for a time on the newly-established European Desk. In 1973, he re-established The Garda Review which had ceased publication and in 1975 was chosen to be one a team of journalists to establish the news features section of RTE under the direction of the legendary Mike Burns.

The fact that he was the first Catholic to be appointed as editor of what was still perceived as a Protestant-oriented newspaper was remarked upon at the time and was seen as part of a process of The Irish Times seeking to broaden its position in Irish society. He was also the first editor to be appointed at the newspaper after a competitive interview process with the participation of staff representatives.

Previously he had been Features Editor, then Night Editor and latterly Deputy Editor. He reported on crime and security and covered events in Northern Ireland before being assigned to the London bureau in the 1970s. Later he worked on the newspaper's European Desk and on a number of assignments abroad, including the accession of new member states to the European Economic Community. He reported on the conflict in Rhodesia, later Zimbabwe. He was appointed as a director of The Irish Times Ltd in 1985.

Brady was judged to be an excellent editor who increased the newspapers circulation figures to their highest levels over two decades. He positioned the newspaper firmly behind the Northern Ireland peace process while strongly supporting the liberal reform agenda in the Republic.

He focused on developing coverage of foreign news with the establishment of overseas bureaux in Moscow, Beijing, South Africa and elsewhere. He also extended the coverage of arts and books as well as finance and sport. The Irish Times launched its first digital editions during his tenure. He was chair of the World Editors Forum (Paris) 1996–2000 and chair of the Advisory Committee to the European Journalism Centre (Maastricht) 1996–1999.

He retired from The Irish Times in 2002, after implementing an editorial restructuring of the organisation, necessitated by an accumulation of high costs and a fall in advertising revenues. Editorial numbers dropped by more than 100 as journalists opted for redundancy terms. There was some staff criticism of the parting package agreed between Brady and the company, with some claims that it was over-generous at a time of financial challenge for the organisation. However, The Irish Times subsequently went into a lengthy period of marked financial success, with reduced costs, strong revenues and free of debt. He published his autobiography, entitled Up with The Times, in 2005.

Between 2014 and 2019 he wrote a weekly column for the Irish edition of The Sunday Times.

== Academia ==
Brady was a visiting professor at John Jay College, City University of New York; Senior Teaching Fellow at Michael Smurfit Graduate School of Business, and University College Dublin. In 2020 he was appointed as Honorary Professor in the journalism school of the National University of Ireland Galway (NUIG). In 2023 he was honoured by the National University of Ireland with an honorary doctorate in literature, D.Litt.

== Civic service ==
Brady was a member of the Garda Síochana Ombudsman Commission from 2005 to 2011. He was chair (2003–2008) of The British-Irish Association. He served as a member of the Remembrance Commission, set up under the Good Friday Agreement. In May 2017 he was appointed to be a member of a new commission on the future of policing in Ireland but he resigned in October, citing lack of resources and political commitment. In 2016 he became a member of the Top Level Appointments Committee (TLAC) becoming its chair in 2019. TLAC selects leadership for senior public service positions.

He has been a non-executive director of ARC Cancer Support and he has been a director of the Institute of International and European Affairs. He is vice chair of Midlands Radio 103 and co-founder of CaliberAI, a defamation and harm speech technology solutions startup. In 2022 he was appointed as chair of the board of Esker Arts CLG, a new arts centre to serve the midlands at Tullamore Co Offaly.

== Writer ==
Brady has several published books on a range of subjects, from histories of the Irish police force to personal memoirs of his journalistic career.

He has also written a series of crime fiction novel, set in Victorian Dublin and featuring the character of "Detective Sergeant Joe Swallow", under the titles A June of Ordinary Murders, The Eloquence of the Dead, A Hunt in Winter and In the Dark River.

== Publications ==
- Guardians of the Peace: The Irish Police (2000).
- Up with The Times (2005).
- A June of Ordinary Murders (2012).
- The Eloquence of the Dead (2013).
- The Guarding of Ireland: The Garda Síochana & the Irish State 1960–2014 (2014).
- A Hunt in Winter (2016).
- In the Dark River (2018)
