= Sunday Tribune =

Former newspaper of Dublin, Ireland

- Sunday Tribune Masthead, 2000s
- Type: Sunday newspaper
- Format: originally tabloid, then broadsheet, later tabloid again
- Owner: Tribune Newspapers PLC
- Editor: Nóirín Hegarty
- Founded: 1980
- Ceased publication: 1982; 2011
- Relaunched: 1983
- Political alignment: Centre/Liberal
- Headquarters: 27-32 Talbot Street, Dublin 1
- Circulation: 65,717 (as of Jan–June 2008)
- Readership: 177,000 (5% of market)
- Website: tribune.ie (defunct)

The Sunday Tribune was an Irish Sunday broadsheet newspaper published by Tribune Newspapers plc. It was founded in 1980 as a tabloid, before converting to broadsheet in 1981. It closed in 1982 and relaunched in 1983. It reverted to tabloid in 2010 and entered receivership in February 2011 after which it ceased to trade. Over the years of its publication it was edited by Conor Brady, Vincent Browne, Peter Murtagh, Matt Cooper, Paddy Murray and Nóirín Hegarty.

== Foundation and collapse ==
The newspaper was founded in 1980 by John Mulcahy as a tabloid with Conor Brady (later editor of The Irish Times) as its first editor. The format changed to broadsheet with the addition of a colour supplement magazine after the first year. It was moderately successful but its growing financial stability (it had not yet made a profit but was moving in that direction) was undermined when its then owner, Hugh McLaughlin, launched the financially misjudged downmarket tabloid Daily News in 1982. The News proved to be a publishing disaster, with poor quality printing, bad distribution, and misjudged content, and pulled its sister paper, the Tribune, down with it within weeks. The Tribune went into receivership.

=== Relaunch ===
The title was bought by Vincent Browne, who relaunched it in 1983 and became its editor. One of the shareholders was Tony Ryan.

== Investment and success ==
The paper became one of Ireland's most successful newspapers in the 1980s, eating into the market of The Sunday Press, which like other Press titles was hæmorrhaging readers through underfunding, an aging market and poor management decisions. Replicating McLoughlin's mistake of a decade earlier, against advice Browne launched a new sister paper, the Dublin Tribune, which collapsed – pulling the Sunday Tribune down with it.

It had a circulation of 65,717 and readership of 177,000 (5% of market) from Jan–June 2008.

The Dublin Tribune, though a commercial failure, was a breeding ground for a number of talented young journalists under the direction of editors Michael Hand and Rory Godson. These included Patricia Deevy, Diarmuid Doyle, Ursula Halligan, Nicola Byrne, Ronan Price, Richard Balls, Paul Howard, Colm Murphy, Brendan Fanning, Conn O Midheach, Rory Kerr, Ryle Nugent and Ed O'Loughlin who was on the shortlist for the Booker Prize for his novel Not Untrue And Not Unkind. Susan McKay joined the staff fulltime in 1992 first as social affairs correspondent and then as Northern Ireland editor.

The Sunday Tribune was saved from bankruptcy by Tony O'Reilly's Independent News and Media (then called Independent Newspapers plc), which acquired a 29.9 per cent stake in the company. Even before the investment the relationship between Browne and the board of the company had been contentious. In the aftermath of the Dublin Tribune debacle Browne was sacked as editor.

Browne was succeeded as editor by Peter Murtagh, a Dublin-born journalist formerly with The Irish Times who moved to London in 1985 and was news editor at The Guardian. Appointed Sunday Tribune editor in 1994, Murtagh had limited success, seeing early circulation growth dissipate and the paper starved of resources. He resigned after just over two years, telling journalists he could not secure sufficient investment from the Board. Later, he rejoined The Irish Times

After taking its 29.9 per cent stake, Independent Newspapers made an offer to increase its share to a majority level, however the Minister for Industry and Commerce, Desmond O'Malley, blocked the takeover attempt in 1992. Despite this, it is believed by many Irish business journalists that Independent Newspapers effectively control the Sunday Tribune via a series of loans.

Matt Cooper, a business journalist with O'Reilly's Irish Independent newspaper, succeeded Murtagh as editor from 1996 to 2003. When Cooper departed the Sunday Tribune in early 2003 and moved into broadcast journalism with Today FM radio station, he was succeeded by Paddy Murray, who was before and afterwards a columnist with the Sunday World newspaper.

Murray's tenure was marked by a rise in circulation to well above 80,000, aided four or five times a year by classical music CD promotions. Readership under Murray reached 281,000 - its highest to date - according to the Joint National Readership Survey of 2005. That represented an 8.4 per cent share. During his time as editor, Murray launched a campaign in the paper to save the Gabhra Valley from destruction by the M3 motorway. The campaign was later dropped by the Sunday Tribune, but Murray kept it up in the Sunday World.

The paper was alone among English-language newspapers in Ireland at the time, to come out strongly against the invasion of Iraq (see however the daily Lá), Murray's editorial predicting, accurately, that the invasion was akin to opening Pandora's Box. Even around this time of relatively improved readership, the future of the newspaper was believed to be uncertain. It continued to survive in the increasingly competitive Irish newspaper for several more years, in part helped by the collapse of the Irish Press group, which removed its highly popular Sunday Press from the market. Though many of its readers would not necessarily have been politically close to the Sunday Tribune, they were closer to it than the main alternative, the Sunday Independent.

After Murray's tenure as editor ended in January 2005 he was succeeded as Sunday Tribune editor by Nóirín Hegarty, a former deputy editor at the INM-owned Dublin morning tabloid Evening Herald. Many journalists believe that in the following years, the Sunday Tribune moved closer to tabloid-style content in a bid to combat INM's rival, Associated Newspapers' tabloid Irish Mail On Sunday newspaper, which launched in 2006. On 19 September 2010 it reverted to tabloid from broadsheet.

In 1983, 1988, 1994 and 2005 the Sunday Tribune published its Christmas edition on Friday 23 & Saturday 24 December due to Sunday being Christmas Day.

== Final closure ==
On 1 February 2011 it was announced that the Sunday Tribune had gone into receivership, with fresh investment being sought by McStay Luby. The following day it was announced that there would be no further edition of the newspaper for four weeks. The last issue appeared on 30 January 2011. On 6 February 2011, the Irish Mail on Sunday committed a "shameless" crime when it allowed copies of its newspaper go on sale with an imitation Sunday Tribune cover. This plagiarism was "denounced" when it became public. The Irish Mail on Sunday was subsequently sued.

The paper was often humorously referred to as "The Turbine", especially in the satirical magazine The Phoenix.

On 22 February 2011, following a review by the Receiver, in consultation with the management of the company, of the financial and risk areas of the Sunday Tribune it was decided that publication of the newspaper together with its online edition would be deferred during the sale process.

== Digital archive ==
The Sunday Tribune's archive from 1986 to 2005 was added to the British Newspaper Archive between November 2018 and February 2019.

== See also ==
- Vincent Browne
- Veronica Guerin
- John Mulcahy
