= Jacob's Awards =

Annual awards for excellence in Irish television and radio (1962–1993)

Jacob's Award
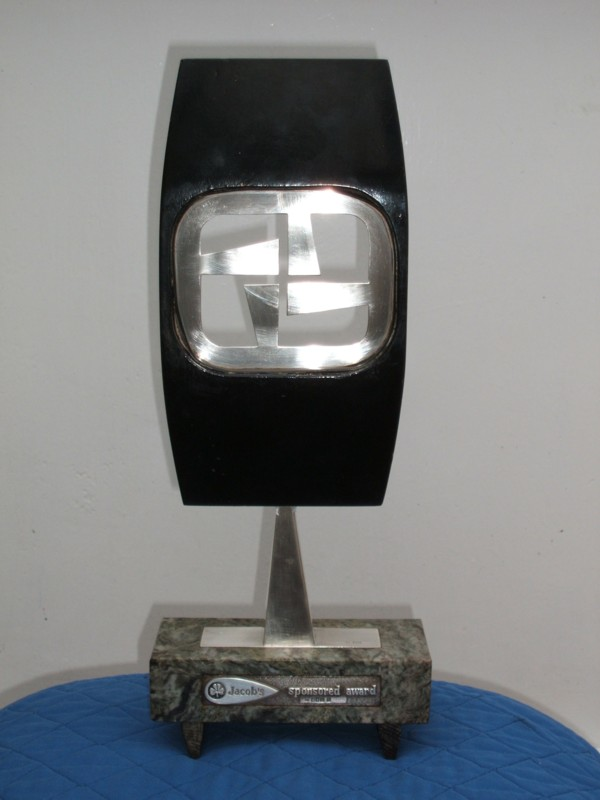
- Jacob's television award
- Awarded for: Outstanding contributions to Irish television and radio
- Country: Ireland
- Presented by: National newspaper television and radio critics
- First award: 1962
- Final award: 1993

The Jacob's Awards were instituted in December 1962 as the first Irish television awards. Later, they were expanded to include radio. The awards were named after their sponsor, W. & R. Jacob & Co. Ltd., a biscuit manufacturer, and recipients were selected by Ireland's national newspaper television and radio critics. Award winners were chosen annually until 1993, when the final awards presentation took place.

Winners of a Jacob's Award include Fionnula Flanagan (1965), Gay Byrne (1979), and Brendan Gleeson (1992). The record for the most awards won is held by Gay Byrne, who was honoured six times between 1963 and 1981.

== History ==
Telefís Éireann was launched as Ireland's first indigenous television station on 31 December 1961. Three months later, it was announced by W. & R. Jacob & Co. Ltd. that they intended to sponsor an award for outstanding contributions to the new medium. According to a retired journalist, Éanna Brophy, public relations consultant and Radio Éireann presenter Frankie Byrne was a key organiser of the awards throughout their existence. Each year separate panels of radio and television reviewers from Irish newspapers met several times in the boardroom of Jacob's, where Byrne presided as panellists debated each other's nominees, and selected winners at the final meeting.

According to former Jacob's chairman, Gordon Lambert, Frankie Byrne actually started the awards in 1962 and her role in their eventual longevity seems to have been crucial. This is borne out by the fact that no ceremonies took place following Byrne's death in December 1993. Recalling her involvement in the awards five years after her death, television critic Tom O'Dea summed up her unique contribution: "I think it is no skin off anyone's nose to accord her the distinction of giving the awards night the character it had, wheelchairs for the irretrievably drunken, and all."

On 4 December 1962, the first awards ceremony took place at the sponsor's headquarters in Dublin. There were nine winners, chosen by a panel of national newspaper television critics. Each winner received an award designed by the artist, Richard Kingston. This consisted of a silver St. Brigid's Cross mounted on a base of bog oak and Connemara marble.

The Jacob's Awards honoured teams of programme makers as well as individuals. For instance, in 1962, Telefís Éireann's Sports Department won an award for its general coverage during the station's first year of broadcasting. In 1965, a limit of eight annual awards was set, and the critics also decided not to confine themselves to fixed categories in making their selections.

A special 'Golden Trophy' was introduced in 1966 to recognise exceptional performance. This was awarded every five years, although it was dropped in the mid-1980s.

In 1969, the number of awards was increased to a maximum of thirteen in order to incorporate radio. A separate panel of national newspaper radio critics was formed to choose recipients of the new award, a highly polished, white metal cylinder designed by Robert Costelloe. This was replaced in 1981 by a trophy comprising a painted canvas mounted on a stainless steel background, designed by Theo McNab.

For most of their history, Jacob's Awards were awarded to programmes broadcast on RTÉ because the national state broadcaster held a monopoly in Ireland. However, in 1989, commercial radio was introduced, and RTÉ's monopoly in sound broadcasting was broken. The critics responded by widening the scope of the awards to include the new local stations. RTÉ did not face indigenous competition in television until the advent of TV3 in 1998, by which time the Jacob's Awards had ended.

== Awards ceremony ==
In early years, awards were presented in Jacob's factory; later they moved to a hotel, usually in Dublin. In the 30 years of its existence, compères of the annual Jacob's Awards event included Hilton Edwards and Frank Hall. Winners were presented with their awards by a senior member of the Irish government, sometimes the taoiseach of the day (Jack Lynch in 1977, for example).

Due to the "economic circumstances of the sponsoring company", the 1983 and 1984 awards were presented at a single event, which took place on 22 February 1985.

What turned out to be the final awards ceremony took place in Dublin on 11 November 1993. The Minister for Arts, Culture and the Gaeltacht, Michael D. Higgins, presented the awards on that occasion. No formal announcement was made by the sponsor about the future of the awards so the reason they were terminated is unknown. However, the death of Frankie Byrne shortly after the 1993 event may have been a factor.

== Controversy ==
The 1970 awards were attended by some controversy. Eoghan Harris refused to accept an award for his production of the Irish-language current affairs programme, Féach. In a statement issued on the day of the awards ceremony, Harris criticised RTÉ for its involvement with commercial sponsorship. However, five years later his attitude changed and he accepted a second award for a special report on 7 Days.

Also in 1970, guests arriving at the awards ceremony were confronted by a picket of 50 female employees of W. & R. Jacob who were protesting against the cost of the banquet. One picketer carried a placard bearing the legend: "Only room at the inn for the in-people".

In 1990, RTÉ threatened to pull out of its longstanding practice of broadcasting the awards ceremony because of the involvement of Tánaiste, Brian Lenihan. Lenihan had been invited to present the awards in his capacity as Tánaiste and Minister of Defence. However, in the meantime, he was chosen by Fianna Fáil as that party's candidate in the forthcoming Irish presidential election. RTÉ claimed that going ahead with its planned broadcast would give unfair additional publicity to Lenihan, leaving the station in breach of its own guidelines on election coverage. After a brief stand-off, Lenihan agreed to withdraw from the awards ceremony. He was replaced by Minister for Labour, Bertie Ahern.

== Winners – multiple awards ==
=== Six ===
- Gay Byrne (1963, 1970, 1971, 1976, 1978, 1981)

=== Four ===
- Mike Murphy (1978, 1979, 1980, 1988)
- Andy O'Mahony (1969, 1981, 1986, 1989)

=== Three ===
- Wesley Burrowes (1965, 1974, 1976)
- Brian Mac Lochlainn (1969, 1971, 1992)
- Olivia O'Leary (1973, 1982, 1986)
- Julian Vignoles (1984, 1991, 1992)

=== Two ===
- Tony Barry (1970, 1990)
- John Bowman (1970, 1981)
- Anne Daly (1980, 1989)
- Norris Davidson (1973, 1974)
- Derek Davis (1983, 1991)
- Donall Farmer (1969, 1978)
- Brian Farrell (1968, 1977)
- Pat Feeley (1977, 1979)
- Alan Gilsenan (1989, 1990)
- Frank Hall (1966, 1975)
- Shay Healy (1984, 1989)
- Michael Heney (1990, 1992)
- Eamon Keane (1966, 1971)
- Joe Lynch (1962, 1977)
- Muiris Mac Conghail (1967, 1985)
- Ciarán Mac Mathúna (1969, 1990)
- Ian McGarry (1975, 1981)
- Joe Mulholland (1977, 1979)
- John O'Donovan (1970, 1974)
- Kevin O'Kelly (1969, 1980)
- Cathal O'Shannon (1976, 1978)
- Eoin Ó Súilleabháin (1965, 1974)
- James Plunkett (1965, 1969)
- John Quinn (1988, 1993)
- RTÉ Sports Department (1962, 1966)

== Winners – full details ==
=== 1960s ===
==== 1962 ====
Television

- Eileen Crowe (Best actress for The Well of the Saints)
- Joe Lynch (Best actor for Shaw's The Shewing-up of Blanco Posnet)
- Burt Budin (Best producer)
- Hancock's Half Hour (Best imported programme)
- Broadsheet (Best home-produced programme)
- Proinsias Mac Aonghusa (Best contribution in the Irish language)
- Hilton Edwards (Most original contribution to television for the series Self Portrait)
- Telefís Éireann's Sports Department (general coverage)
- Charles Mitchel (Newsreader)

==== 1963 ====
Television

- Blaithin Nic Chaomhin (Best contribution in the Irish language)
- Radharc (Most enterprising programme)
- Conor Cruise O'Brien (Best original script for programme on Charles Stewart Parnell)
- Telefís Éireann's Sports Department (Best outside broadcast)
- Cyril Cusack (Best actor for Triptych)
- Gay Byrne (Outstanding personality)
- Peter Collinson, (Best producer for The Bomb)
- Monica Sheridan (Individual award for her cookery programme)

==== 1964 ====
Television

- Bunny Carr (Presenter of Teen Talk)
- Paddy Jennings (Editor of On The Land)
- Paddy Crosbie ("for his many amusing and entertaining contributions to Telefís Éireann")
- Brian Cleeve (script and narration on Discovery)
- Jim Norton (acting performance in Solo series)
- 64 (current affairs series)
- Alan Pleass (design of Letter from the General)
- Chloe Gibson (producer of The Importance of Being Oscar)
- The Great War, (BBC series)
- Micheál MacLiammóir (acting performance in The Importance of Being Oscar)

==== 1965 ====
Television

- Wesley Burrowes (contributions to Telefís Éireann's Drama Department)
- James Plunkett (writer and producer of Many Happy Christmases episode of The Life and Times of Jimmy O'Dea)
- Gerry Murray (producer of TV coverage of the 1965 Irish General Election)
- Tom McGrath (producer of Irish National Song Contest)
- Fionnula Flanagan (acting performance in An Triail)
- Eoin Ó Súilleabháin (presenter of Labhair Gaeilge Linn)
- Peter Watkins (writer and director of Culloden)

==== 1966 ====
Television

- Michael Viney (maker of documentary Too Many Children)
- Frank Hall (editor of Newsbeat)
- Lelia Doolan (producer of The Plough and the Stars)
- May Cluskey (acting performance in Tolka Row and The Plough and the Stars)
- Eamonn Keane (acting performance in When do you die, Friend?)
- Justin Keating (writer and presenter of Telefís Feirme)
- Stuart Hetherington ("for his outstanding film work")
- Andreas Ó Gallchóir (producer of On Behalf of the Provisional Government)

Golden Trophy

- RTÉ Sports Department

==== 1967 ====
Television

- John Cowley (acting performance in The Riordans series)
- John Healy (scriptwriter for Headlines and Deadlines)
- Telefís Scoile (television lessons for schools)
- Muiris Mac Conghail (producer of current affairs programme 7 Days)
- Amuigh Faoin Spéir (Irish: "Out Under the Sky") (wildlife series)
- The Forsyte Saga (BBC drama series, adaptation of novels)

==== 1968 ====
Television

- Marie Kean (for her acting performance in Samuel Beckett's Happy Days)
- Rev. Romuald Dodd O.P. (for the high standard of religious programmes)
- Brian Farrell (presenter of 7 Days)
- Augustine Martin (presenter of Telefís Scoile programme on English literature)
- Jeremy Sandford (writer of Cathy Come Home)

==== 1969 ====
Radio

- Diarmuid Ó Muirithe (presenter of Idir Shúgradh is Dáiríre)
- Andy O'Mahony ("for his consistently high standard in broadcasting and presentation")
- Noel Ó Briain (producer of Judas Iscariot agus a Bhean)
- Máire Ní Mhurchú ("for the intuitive sympathy she shows towards those to whom she talks and the manner in which she conveys her enjoyment in broadcasting").
- Ciarán Mac Mathúna ("for his work in the discovery and conservation of traditional Irish music")
- Mike Burns (news and current affairs)
- A. J. Potter (composer of Sinfonia de Profundis)

Television

- Kevin O'Kelly (commentator on Apollo 11 moon landing)
- Brian Mac Lochlainn (producer of Oileán Tearmainn)
- Donall Farmer (producer of Looking into Drama)
- Aideen O'Kelly (acting performance in Oileán Tearmainn)
- James Plunkett (producer of Anthology, arts programme)
- Hugh Leonard (scriptwriter on TV adaptations of Nicholas Nickleby and Wuthering Heights)

=== 1970s ===
==== 1970 ====
Radio

- Rick Walshe
- John Bowman
- Pat Sweeney
- Rhoda Coghill
- P. J. O'Connor
- Aidan Grennell

Television

- John O'Donovan
- Bil Keating
- Tony Barry
- Lord Kenneth Clark
- Gay Byrne

==== 1971 ====
Radio

- Eamonn Keane (radio drama)
- Liam Nolan ("for his achievement in improving the prestige of sound broadcasting")
- Liam Hourican (reports on Northern Ireland)
- Sunday Miscellany (magazine programme)

Television

- Brian Mac Lochlainn (producer of A Week in the Life of Martin Cluxton)
- Canon J. G. McGarry (contributor to Outlook, religious series)
- Michael Ryan (presenter of Enterprise)
- Alpho O'Reilly (designer of 1971 Eurovision Song Contest)

Golden Trophy

- Gay Byrne

==== 1972 ====
Radio

- Gene Martin (producer)
- Jimmy Magee (sports commentator)
- Tom McGurk (documentary maker)
- Micheál Ó Conaola (documentary maker)
- Rosaleen Linehan (Get an Earful of This)

Television

- Pan Collins (researcher on The Late Late Show)
- Noel Smyth (producer of Encounter)
- Rory O'Farrell (film editor of Belfast 1972)
- Mike Twomey (cast member on Hall's Pictorial Weekly)
- Frank Duggan (cast member on Hall's Pictorial Weekly)
- Paddy Gallagher (presenter of Report, current affairs series)

==== 1973 ====
Radio

- Roibeard Ó Faracháin (Controller of Radio Programmes for "his defence of free speech since the early days of broadcasting and for his aesthetic sense in encouraging programmes like the Thomas Davis lectures")
- Kieran Sheedy (editor of Imprint)
- Tommy O'Brien (presenter of Your Choice and Mine)
- Olivia O'Leary (news reporter)

Television

- Norris Davidson (documentary maker)
- Niall Toibín (star of If The Cap Fits)
- Tim O'Connor (Editor of The Sunday Sports Show)
- Deirdre Friel (director of Cancer by Eugene McCabe)
- Eileen Colgan (acting performance in Hatchet by Heno Magee)
- Ted Nealon (presenter of 1973 Irish general election results)
- Alistair Cooke (writer and presenter of Alistair Cooke's America)

==== 1974 ====
Radio

- Eoin Ó Súilleabháin (acting performance in The Father)
- Aine McEvoy (producer of Church in Action, religious affairs programme)
- Norris Davidson (opera commentaries)
- Neasa Ní Annracháin ("for her outstanding contribution to a distinguished company of actors")
- John O'Donovan (host of Dear Sir or Madam, listener feedback programme)
- Joe Linnane ("long and meritorious service to broadcasting")

Television

- Peggy Dell (light entertainment)
- Louis Lentin (drama production)
- Frank Kelly (cast of Hall's Pictorial Weekly)
- Wesley Burrowes (creator and scriptwriter The Riordans)

==== 1975 ====
Radio

- Diarmuid Peavoy (Listen and See - programme for the blind)
- Michael O'Callaghan (My Own Place)

Television

- Frank Hall ("for creating an original programme format and for the independence and individuality of his style")
- Terry Willers (cartoonist on Hall's Pictorial Weekly)
- Maire de Barra (presenter of Rogha Ceoil)
- Eoghan Harris (7 Days documentary on the Dublin Bay oil refinery)
- Ian McGarry (music presenter)
- Proinsias Ó Duinn (orchestral conductor)
- John Alderton (acting performance in My Wife Next Door)
- Adrian Malone (executive producer of The Ascent of Man)

==== 1976 ====
Radio

- Gay Byrne (for The Gay Byrne Show)
- Eavan Boland (The Arts Programme)
- Tom McArdle (Knock at the Door - pre-school programme)
- Padraic Ó Raghallaigh ("for the sustained excellence of his interview series")

Television

- Cathal O'Shannon (documentary on Spanish Civil War, Even The Olives Are Bleeding)
- John Kelleher (producer of The Greening of America)
- Liam Ó Murchú (presenter of Trom agus Éadrom)
- Eugene McCabe (writer of trilogy of TV plays Victims)
- Tony Kenny (light entertainment)
- Pat Fergus (presenter of Landmark, agricultural matters)

Golden Trophy

- Wesley Burrowes (scriptwriter and editor of The Riordans)

==== 1977 ====
Radio

- Jane Carty (for encouraging Irish musicians)
- Kathleen Kelliher (Helping Adults to Read)
- Albert Rosen (conductor of the RTÉ Symphony Orchestra)
- Pat Feeley (Coiciosan – new writing in the Irish language)

Television

- John O'Donoghue (presenter of PM)
- Brian Farrell (presenter of 1977 Irish general election results)
- Joe Lynch (acting performance in Eugene McCabe's TV play King of the Castle)
- Joe Mulholland (producer of Féach programme on a fishing tragedy in County Donegal)
- Eamon Morrissey (cast of Hall's Pictorial Weekly)

==== 1978 ====
Radio

- Al Byrne (Discovery programme on nuclear energy)
- Bernadette Greevy (for her performance in Mahler concert)
- Leo Enright (report on Dublin delinquents for This Week)
- Proinsias Ó Conluain (documentary on Irish countryside)

Television

- Gay Byrne (host of live coverage of Rose of Tralee contest)
- Maeve Binchy (writer of TV play Deeply Regretted By...)
- Mike Murphy (presenter of Murphy's America)
- Peter McNiff ("for his courageous handling of issues on Newsround")
- Donal Farmer (acting performance in Deeply Regretted By...)
- Cathal O'Shannon ("for his sympathetic interviewing style" in Emmet Dalton Remembers)

==== 1979 ====
Radio

- Morgan O'Sullivan (presenter of Late Date)
- Marian Finucane (presenter of Women Today)
- Dan Treston (producer of The Secret Garden)
- Pat Feeley ("for his programmes on Irish social history")

Television

- Gabriel Byrne (acting performance in Bracken)
- Mike Murphy (presenter of The Live Mike)
- Con Bushe (programmes for young people)
- Michael O'Carroll (Wheels in Unison - The Health Race '79)
- Mick Lally (acting performance in Roma and Bracken)
- Joe Mulholland (Let My Tombstone be of Granite - documentary on Frank Ryan)
- RTÉ (special award to the station for its coverage of the visit to Ireland by Pope John Paul II)

=== 1980s ===
==== 1980 ====
Radio

- Kevin O'Kelly (presenter of Addendum - religious affairs series)
- John Skehan (presenter of Play It Again, John - extracts from the radio archive)
- Anne Daly (reporting of Archbishop Romero's funeral)
- Dave Fanning (disc jockey)
- Mike Murphy (for his early morning radio show)

Television

- John Lynch (producer of The Law Courts edition of Insight series)
- Frank Cvitanovich (producer and director of Murphy's Stroke - documentary on the Gay Future betting coup)
- Frank Grimes (acting performance in Strumpet City)
- John McColgan (producer of Hunky Dory - musical based on songs by Dory Previn)
- Robert Kee (writer and presenter of Ireland - A Television History)
- Barry Cowan (presenter of Today Tonight - current affairs series)

==== 1981 ====
Radio

- Harry Bradshaw (presenter of Folkland and The Long Note)
- Andy O'Mahony (presenter of Page by Page and The Church in Action)
- John Bowman (presenter of Day by Day)
- Pat Kenny (for "evidence of unusual versatility" as presenter of Saturday View on RTÉ Radio 1, The Kenny Report and The Outside Track, both on RTÉ 2fm)

Television

- Forbes McFall (reporter on Today Tonight)
- Bernard MacLaverty (author of TV play My Dear Palestrina)
- Godfrey Graham (lighting cameraman on Eugene McCabe's play Winter Music)
- Ian McGarry (producer/director of the TV coverage of the 1981 Eurovision Song Contest)
- Tish Barry (reporter on edition of Today Tonight dealing with victims of The Troubles in Northern Ireland)
- Twink (performer in the Christmas Light Entertainment Special on RTÉ Two)

Golden Trophy

- Gay Byrne ("in recognition of his outstanding broadcasting achievements on both radio and television")

==== 1982 ====
Radio

- Donal Flanagan (producer of Introspect series)
- Ray Lynott (presenter of A Traveller's Tunes)
- Des Kenny (presenter of Ask About Gardening)
- William Styles (producer of radio adaptation of James Joyce's Ulysses)

Television

- Seán Ó Mordha (producer of Is there one who understands me? - documentary on James Joyce)
- Pat O'Connor (director of TV adaptation of The Ballroom of Romance)
- Olivia O'Leary (presenter of Today Tonight)
- William Trevor (author of The Ballroom of Romance)

==== 1983 ====
Radio

- Jim Fahy ("for unearthing treasures from our tradition in Looking)
- Mark Cagney (RTÉ 2fm disc jockey)
- Caroline Murphy (sports commentator)
- Betty Purcell (presenter of Talk Back)
- Venetia O'Sullivan (In Love with Ireland - documentary on Arnold Bax)

Television

- Derek Davis (Presenter of The Season That's In It)
- Brendan O'Brien, (reporter on Today Tonight)
- Mary McEvoy (acting performance in Glenroe)
- Brian Lynch (author of Caught in a Free State)
- Teresa Mannion (co-presenter of Youngline)
- Mary Dinan (co-presenter of Youngline)

==== 1984 ====
Radio

- Siobhan McHugh/Shay Healy (producer and presenter of Strawberry Fields Forever - documentary series on the 1960s)
- Padraic Dolan (documentary maker You Can't Live on Love - programme on unemployment)
- Julian Vignoles ("for demonstrating the creative role which the producer can play in many areas on radio")
- Michael Littleton (for development of The Thomas Davis Lectures)

Television

- Bob Quinn (scriptwriter and director of Atlantean)
- Ciana Campbell (presenter of Access)
- J. Graham Reid (writer of The Billy Trilogy)
- Joe O'Donnell (creator and producer of Bosco)

==== 1985 ====
Radio

- P. J. Curtis (presenter of His Kind of Music)
- Hilary Orpen (producer of Liveline)
- David Hanley (presenter of Morning Ireland)
- John Caden (producer of The Gay Byrne Show)

Television

- Muiris Mac Conghail (for Oileán Eile - documentary on the Blasket Islands)
- Michael O'Connell (producer of Shadows - series on Victorian Ireland)
- Niall Mathews (producer of Live Aid for Africa)
- David Shaw Smith (film-maker and producer of English Silk)
- Nuala O'Faolain (producer of Plain Tales)

==== 1986 ====
Radio

- Andy O'Mahony (presenter of Books and Company)
- BP Fallon (presenter of The BP Fallon Orchestra)
- Colette Proctor (acting performance in The Far Side of the Moon)
- Brendan Balfe (presenter of The Spice of Life documentary series)
- Larry Gogan (presenter of Ireland's Top Thirty)

Television

- Olivia O'Leary (presenter of Questions and Answers)
- Michael T. Murphy (Access Community Drama)
- Marty Whelan (presenter of Videofile)
- Éamon de Buitléar (presenter of Cois Farraige leis an Madra Uisce)
- Eugene Murray (editor of Today Tonight)
- Thelma Mansfield (co-presenter of Live at 3)

==== 1987 ====
No awards listed

==== 1988 ====
Radio

- John Quinn (series on Ewan MacColl and Peggy Seeger)
- Martha McCarron (The Sad, the Mad and the Bad - series on institutional life in Ireland)
- Colm Keane (American Profiles)
- Myles Dungan (14-part series Vietnam)
- Treasa Davison (presenter of Playback)

Television

- Ray McAnally (acting performance in A Very British Coup)
- John Feehan (writer of Exploring the Landscape - natural geography series)
- John McHugh (researcher of The Late Late Show special on The Dubliners)
- Michael Lyster (presenter of The Sunday Game)
- Declan Lowney (director of the 1988 Eurovision Song Contest)
- Mike Murphy (presenter of Murphy's Australia)

==== 1989 ====
Radio

- Anne Daly (reporter on Worlds Apart)
- Andy O'Mahony (presenter of The Sunday Show)
- Bill Long (producer of Singing Ark, Flowering Flood - documentary on Dylan Thomas)
- John MacKenna (How the heart approaches what it yearns)
- Eamonn Ó Muirí

Television

- Zig and Zag ("for keeping the children of the nation happy")
- Alan Gilsenan (documentary on Irish emigrants)
- Colm Connolly (director, writer and narrator of The Shadow of Béalnabláth)
- Bernard Loughlin (narrator of The Border - The Great Divide)
- Shay Healy

=== 1990s ===
==== 1990 ====
Radio

- Cathal Mac Coille (co-presenter of Morning Ireland)
- Gerry Ryan (presenter of The Gerry Ryan Show on RTÉ 2fm)
- Luke Verling (documentary maker The Story of the West Clare Railway for Clare FM)
- Ciarán Mac Mathúna (presenter of Mo Cheol Thú)
- Nell McCafferty (for her reports on the 1990 World Cup for The Pat Kenny Show)
- Ken Murray (documentary maker Our Man in Europe for LMFM)
- Mick Bourke ("for his seamless editing of a sound picture of an All-Ireland Final day")

Television

- Michael Heney (for a series of documentaries on public issues)
- Bill O'Herlihy (presenter of Network 2 coverage of 1990 World Cup)
- Alan Gilsenan (director of documentary on AIDS)
- Tony Barry (director of TV adaptation of Somerville and Ross' novel, The Real Charlotte)
- Mary Raftery (reporter on edition of Today Tonight dealing with |Patrick Gallagher's property empire)
- Stella McCusker (acting performance in Dear Sarah)

==== 1991 ====
Radio

- Paddy O'Gorman (presenter of Queuing for a Living on RTÉ Radio 1)
- Julian Vignoles (producer of documentary, No Meadows in Manhattan, on RTÉ Radio 1)
- Stevie Bolger (presenter of Afternoon Tea with Stevie B. on Cork 89FM)
- Dermot Morgan (writer and performer in Scrap Saturday on RTÉ Radio 1)
- Robert Fisk (for his coverage of the Gulf War on RTÉ Radio 1)
- Seán Bán Breathnach (sports commentaries on RTÉ Raidió na Gaeltachta)
- Dan Collins (presenter of The Rambling House on Radio Kerry)

Television

List incomplete (see Talk Page)

- Derek Davis (co-presenter of Live at 3)
- Sean Duignan (presenter of Six-One News)

==== 1992 ====
Radio

- John Creedon (presenter of RTÉ Radio 1's Risin' Time)
- Joe Duffy (reporter on RTÉ Radio 1's The Gay Byrne Show)
- Orla Guerin (RTÉ's Eastern Europe correspondent)
- Mícheál Ó Muircheartaigh (Gaelic Games reporter on RTÉ Radio 1's Sunday Sport show)
- Joe Steve Ó Neachtain (writer/actor in RTÉ Raidió na Gaeltachta's drama series, Baile an Droichid)
- Julian Vignoles (RTÉ Radio 1 documentary maker Death of a Farmer)
- Eilis Geary (presenter of The Arts Programme on Cork's 96FM and 103FM)

Television

- Michael Heney (reporter on edition of Today Tonight series dealing with the Nicky Kelly case)
- Brendan Gleeson (acting performance in The Treaty - drama about Michael Collins broadcast on RTÉ One)
- Brian Mac Lochlainn (producer of Network 2's Nighthawks series)
- Rynagh O'Grady (documentary maker Born Bolshie - Chloe Gibson's contribution to Irish television drama)
- Seán Ó Tuarisg (presenter of RTÉ One's Cursaí)
- Dick Warner (presenter of Waterways)

==== 1993 ====
Radio

- Des Cahill (RTÉ Radio)
- Tim Lehane (RTÉ Radio)
- John Quinn (RTÉ Radio)
- Doireann Ní Bhriain (RTÉ Radio)
- Tomás Ó Ceallaigh (Raidió na Gaeltachta)
- Martin Maguire (LMFM)

Television

- Anne McCabe (RTÉ)
- Donal Toolan (RTÉ)
- Moya Doherty (RTÉ)
- Ray D'Arcy (RTÉ)
- Ian Gibson (ITV)
- Mark Galloway (ITV)

== See also ==
- IFTA Film & Drama Awards
