= Philip Young =

Philip Young may refer to the following people:

- Philip Young (ambassador) (1910–1987), American diplomat
- Philip Young (security officer), convicted of murder in Afghanistan
- Philip E. Young, founder of Titleist
- Philip Young (MP), Member of Parliament (MP) for Shropshire
- Phil Young (rugby league), Australian rugby league player
- Phil Young (writer), Irish writer
- Phil Young (politician), member of the Connecticut House of Representatives
- Philip Yonge or Young (1709–1783), British clergyman
