= Jim Fahy =

Irish journalist (1946–2022)

- Born: James Fahy; 21 November 1946; Loughrea, County Galway, Connacht, Ireland
- Died: 14 January 2022 (aged 75); Tuam, County Galway, Connacht, Ireland
- Education: Kilrickle National School; De la Salle School, Loughrea; Garbally College
- Occupations: Journalist and broadcaster
- Years active: 1965–2011
- Employer: RTÉ (1974–2011)
- Known for: Looking West; Western Editor RTÉ News
- Awards: Jacob's Awards for Radio 1984

James Fahy (21 November 1946 – 14 January 2022) was an Irish journalist, broadcaster and documentary-maker. He was the Western Editor for RTÉ News and was RTÉ's longest-serving regional correspondent at the time of his retirement in 2011.

== Early life ==
Fahy was born in Kilrickle, County Galway, in 1946. He was educated locally in Kilrickle National School, De la Salle School, Loughrea and Garbally College (1960–1964). He aspired to become a pilot, but instead embarked on a career as a journalist.

== Career ==
Fahy started working in 1965 for The Tuam Herald. While working at the paper he wrote a social diary which he called Nitescene. He was looked upon with great respect by his former colleagues at the paper.

Fahy joined RTÉ in 1974 as its first Western News Correspondent. In his early career in this role he reported on events such as the building and controversy of Ireland West Airport, the kidnapping of Don Tidey by the IRA and the affair that local Bishop Eamon Casey had. He is well known for making over 450 editions of Looking West for RTÉ Radio between 1977 and 1984, a programme about storytellers and musicians in the West of Ireland. It was described by The Irish Times as "ground-breaking".

While working for RTÉ News and Current Affairs, Fahy also travelled abroad, making many documentaries, a large number of which featured Irish aid workers. With producer Dick Warner, he interviewed Mother Teresa of Calcutta in 1976 and journeyed across Africa for documentaries. More recently, he reported from Belarus, Haiti and Somalia. He was also on the scene of the September 11 attacks and profiled the Irish-American victims of them. In 2002, his documentary Stories from the Twin Towers won a gold medal at the New York Festivals Television Programming Awards.

Fahy won numerous other awards, including a Jacob's Award in 1984, as well as forty other national and international awards, many with producer Caroline Bleahen.

[..] every single thing that happened in the West of Ireland, be it political or cultural or international, the first thing people would say to each other was, 'have you contacted Jim Fahy?' [...]

— President Michael D. Higgins, RTÉ News: Six One, 31 December 2011.

Fahy was appointed to the position of Western Editor by RTÉ in 2005, and was based in the station's Galway studio. In 2011, he retired along with other high-profile news broadcasters Anne Doyle and Michael Ryan. He worked for the station for 37 years and was accomplished as the longest-serving regional news correspondent. His final news report was broadcast on RTÉ on 31 December 2011. A tribute was paid to him from President Michael D. Higgins, who said that he would be "missed" and that he has a "seductive charm".

Fahy compiled a biography on the Irish-American labour poet Michael McGovern, which was published posthumously in 2025.

== Personal life ==
Fahy was married to Christina until his death. Together, they had two children: Shane and Aideen.

Fahy died at his home in Tuam on 14 January 2022, at the age of 75.
