= Michael Twomey (actor) =

Irish actor, comedian, director, producer and writer

- Born: 21 February 1933; Ballintemple, Cork, Ireland
- Died: 16 August 2017 (aged 84); College Road, Cork, Ireland
- Occupations: Insurance salesman, actor, comedian, director, producer, writer
- Years active: 1944–2017
- Television: Newsbeat; Hall's Pictorial Weekly
- Spouse: Marie Twomey
- Children: 1 boy and 2 girls

Michael F. Twomey (21 February 1933 – 16 August 2017) was an Irish actor, comedian, director, producer and writer who together with Frank Duggan formed the award-winning double act Cha and Miah. The partnership lasted from 1969 until their retirement in 2012.

Born in Cork, Twomey was introduced to the theatre by his mother, an enthusiastic amateur actress. He made his first appeared on stage in the old Cork Opera House in 1944 at the age 11, in Eugene O'Neill's Ah, Wilderness! He played on and off in theatre, pantomime and revues in Cork for the next 70 years and also formed a friendship with the playwright John B. Keane, playing in the early productions of many of his plays with the Southern Theatre Company.

Twomey also had a small part in John Huston's 1956 film Moby Dick, however, his big television break came in 1969 when he performed a spoof interview about the dangers of smoking on Telefís Éireann. When Frank Hall later asked him do a slot on his Newsbeat show, Frank Duggan was drafted in to form a double act. They became household names through their weekly slot on Hall's Pictorial Weekly between 1971 and 1980, with Twomey’s Miah in the role of pub philosopher and the dimwitted Cha as his foil.
