= Discovery (Irish TV series) =

1960s Irish documentary television series

Discovery is the first documentary television series to be broadcast on RTÉ. The series started on 7 January 1964 with a programme on Dublin Airport.

The series producer was Charlie Scott, and Brian Cleeve was the presenter and scriptwriter. Each half-hour edition focused on a specific subject, such as a commercial or state enterprise, an aspect of Irish culture, or some notable feature of the country's landscape.

In December 1964, Brian Cleeve received a Jacobs' Award for his contribution to the programme. However, in January 1966, it was announced that Cleeve was being dropped as the series' narrator because his voice was no longer felt to be suitable. Later that year, he left the programme completely to join the new 7 Days team.

Following Cleeve's departure, Discovery continued for another season using a number of alternative presenters, such as Paddy Gallagher, John Skehan, Michael Viney, and Terry Wogan.

In 2002, RTÉ screened digitally remastered versions of several of the original programmes. The topics covered included skydiving, mountaineering in the Wicklow mountains, and lighthouses off the Cork coast.
