= Ciarán Mac Mathúna =

Irish broadcaster and music collector (1925-2009)

- Born: 26 November 1925; Limerick
- Died: 11 December 2009 (aged 84)
- Occupations: Folklorist, Broadcaster
- Known for: Collecting music; Mo Cheol Thú

Ciarán Mac Mathúna (26 November 1925 – 11 December 2009) was an Irish broadcaster and music collector. He was a recognised authority on Irish traditional music and lectured extensively on the subject. He travelled around Ireland, England, Scotland and America collecting music.

According to Sam Smyth in the Irish Independent, Mac Mathúna was "on a mission to collect songs and stories, music, poetry and dance before they were buried under the coming tsunami of pop music".

He presented the radio programme, Mo Cheol Thú, for 35 years. Upon his retirement in 2005, the managing director of RTÉ Radio, Adrian Moynes, described Mac Mathúna as "inseparable from RTÉ Radio". Upon his death in 2009, the Irish Independent described him as "a national treasure".

== Early life and education ==
Mac Mathúna was born in Limerick, spending his early years in Mulgrave Street. He was schooled at CBS Sexton St, and later graduated from University College Dublin with a BA in modern Irish and Latin. Subsequently, he completed an MA in Irish.

== Career ==
After college Mac Mathúna worked as a teacher and later at the Placenames Commission. In 1954, he joined Radio Éireann where his job was to record Irish traditional musicians playing in their own locales. This entailed visiting such places as Sliabh Luachra, County Clare and County Sligo, and the resulting recordings featured in his radio programmes:

- Ceolta Tire
- A Job of Journeywork — listened to by Johnny McEvoy
- Humours of Donnybrook — Al O'Donnell and Luke Kelly performed a famous version of "On Raglan Road" on this show in 1979

Director-General of RTÉ Cathal Goan later recalled that Mac Mathúna interviewed him for his first job at the station. Goan assisted in the organisation of Mac Mathúna's music collection for the RTÉ Libraries and Archives.

Mac Mathúna's long-running Sunday morning radio series Mo Cheol Thú (You are my music) began in 1970 and continued until November 2005, when he retired from broadcasting. Each 45-minute programme offered a miscellany of archive music, poetry and folklore, mainly of Irish origin. It was one of radio's longest running programmes. The last episode was broadcast on 27 November 2005 at 8.10 am.

Mac Mathúna won two Jacob's Awards, in 1969 and 1990, for his RTÉ Radio programmes promoting Irish traditional music. He received the Freedom of Limerick city in June 2004. He was also awarded honorary doctorates by NUI Galway and the University of Limerick. In 2007, he received the Musicians Award at the 10th annual TG4 Traditional Music Awards.

Joe Kennedy in the Sunday Independent in 2007 compared Mac Mathúna to "an amiable rock, rolling gently along, still picking up some moss and morsels of music that he may have missed".

== Personal and later life ==
His wife Dolly MacMahon (using the English version of her surname) was a singer of traditional songs. She came from Galway and met her husband in 1955. He had two sons named Padraic and Ciarán, one daughter named Déirdre, and four grandchildren at the time of his death: Eoin, Colm, Conor and Liam.

He died on 11 December 2009.

Taoiseach Brian Cowen paid tribute, saying: “He was encyclopaedic in his knowledge of Irish traditional music and its artists and for many decades, wherever good Irish music was played and enjoyed, Ciarán was to be found in its midst”. Minister for Arts, Sport and Tourism Martin Cullen described Mac Mathúna as "a man of great intellect with a wonderful commitment to and understanding of Irish folklore and the traditional arts". Niall Stokes, editor of Hot Press, spoke of being "in the process of losing a great generation of Irish folk pioneers" — musician Liam Clancy had died just days previously – and called for a "[continuation of] justice to the extraordinary work they did in reviving the true spirit of Irish folk and traditional music and re-instating it at the heart of the Irish experience [...] in our public policy, and in particular our broadcasting framework". A billboard advertisement for Mo Cheol Thú with the caption “The Touch of the Master’s Hand’’ was positioned in Terenure College Chapel where his corpse was carried.

Mac Mathúna's funeral on 15 December 2009 was attended by hundreds of people, including aides-de-camp of the President and Taoiseach, RTÉ Director-General Cathal Goan, poet Séamus Heaney and others. Heaney said at the funeral:

Over a lifetime he helped the population of Ireland to realise the beauty, strength and value of their native cultural possessions, above all their musical culture. The musical instrument which Ciaran played to magical effect, and which entranced generations of listeners, was his own voice.

Musicians to perform at the ceremony included Peadar Ó Riada, Cór Cúil Aodha and members of The Chieftains and Planxty. The corpse was then taken to Mount Jerome Crematorium. Journalist Kevin Myers said Mac Mathúna's legacy would be the "rebirth of Irish music", adding:

Well, if Ciarán Mac Mathúna can die, I suppose anyone can. Actually, I had always thought that he was immortal. He certainly appeared to have all the ingredients.

== See also ==
- List of Irish music collectors
