= Eamon Morrissey (actor) =

Irish actor (born 1943)

- Born: 25 January 1943 (age 82); Dublin, Ireland
- Occupation: Actor
- Years active: 1964–present

Eamon Morrissey (born 25 January 1943) is an Irish actor, best known for his comic performances on stage and television. He currently plays Cass Cassidy in Fair City.

== Early life ==
An only child, Morrissey was born in Dublin and grew up in the suburb of Ranelagh. His parents encouraged his early interest in stage performance and he won several medals for his recitations at the Feis Ceoil. While still in his teens and a pupil at Synge Street CBS, Morrissey worked part-time as a stage manager in various Dublin theatres. He left school before sitting the Leaving Certificate in order to try his hand at acting in London. After spending several years there doing odd jobs, he was chosen for the part of Ned, the emigrant, in the 1964 world première of Brian Friel's Philadelphia, Here I Come!.

== Career ==
=== Stage ===
Philadelphia, Here I Come! later became a huge success on Broadway and Morrissey enjoyed a lengthy sojourn in the United States as a member of the cast. In July 1967, another Friel play, Lovers, opened at the Gate Theatre in Dublin with Morrissey in the leading role of Joe.

In 1974, Morrissey adapted the satirical writings of Brian O'Nolan into a successful one-man show entitled The Brother. In his two-hour solo performance, Morrissey portrays a "porter-swilling, nose-picking pub philosopher with ingenious solutions to the world's problems". The Brother continues to be an enduring hit with audiences throughout the world. Morrissey went on to create two more one-man shows, Patrick Gulliver, drawn from the works of Jonathan Swift, and Joycemen, which features various characters from James Joyce's Ulysses.

=== Television ===
In 1977, Morrissey won a Jacob's Award for his performances in Frank Hall's long-running satirical TV series, Hall's Pictorial Weekly. Each week he appeared as a variety of grotesque characters, most notably The Minister for Hardship (based on the then-Finance Minister, Richie Ryan). Two decades later, he appeared as Father Derek Beeching in "Speed 3", an episode of Channel 4's sitcom Father Ted.

In 2009, Morrissey returned to prime-time Irish television as Cass Cassidy in the RTÉ One soap opera, Fair City. In 2011, Morrissey was among the nominees for Best Supporting Actor at the annual Irish Film and Television Awards (IFTAs) for his role in Fair City.

=== Film ===
Morrissey's most significant movie appearance to date came in 1986 when he took the central role of Arthur in Peter Ormrod's Eat the Peach.

== See also ==
- List of Fair City characters
