= Barry Cowan =

Barry Cowan may refer to:

- Barry Cowan (broadcaster) (1948–2004), journalist and broadcaster with BBC Northern Ireland
- Barry Cowan (tennis) (born 1974), former British tennis player

== See also ==
- Barry Cowen (born 1967), Irish politician
