= John O'Donoghue =

John O'Donoghue may refer to:

- John O'Donoghue (politician) (born 1956), Irish Fianna Fáil politician
- John O'Donoghue (TV presenter), Irish journalist
- John O'Donoghue (1960s pitcher) (born 1939), American player
- John O'Donoghue (1990s pitcher) (born 1969), American baseball player
- John O'Donoghue (poet) (1954–2008), Irish Catholic poet, spiritual writer and philosopher
- John O'Donoghue (hurler) (born 1942), former Irish hurler
