= John Skehan =

Irish reporter and presenter (1922–1992)

- Born: 18 July 1922
- Died: 18 November 1992 (aged 70)
- Occupations: Broadcaster, commentator

John Skehan (18 July 1922 – 18 November 1992) was a prolific broadcaster on RTÉ, radio and television, for four decades.

Prior to joining RTÉ, Skehan served in the Irish Army, reaching the rank of captain during The Emergency.

Skehan began his television career as a reporter on Broadsheet, Telefís Éireann's first current affairs series. He went on to become a familiar face and voice on later programmes such as Discovery.

Later he moved to radio and, in 1980, he won a Jacob's Award for his radio archive series Play It Again, John. In the late 1980s and 1990s he presented a weekly series on RTÉ Radio 1 entitled Words and Music, in which he interviewed notable people and played a selection of their favourite records.

Towards the end of his life, Skehan returned to television as a snooker commentator.
