= John Bowman (broadcaster) =

Irish historian and broadcaster (born 1942)

- Born: 28 July 1942 (age 84); Dublin, Ireland
- Education: Belvedere College; Trinity College Dublin (TCD)
- Occupations: Journalist, broadcaster, historian
- Employer: RTÉ
- Spouse: Eimer Philbin Bowman
- Children: 4, including Jonathan and Abie

John Bowman (born 28 July 1942) is an Irish historian and a long-standing broadcaster and presenter of current affairs and political programmes with RTÉ. He chaired the audience-participation political programme Questions and Answers on RTÉ One for 21 years. He is the father of comedian and journalist Abie Philbin Bowman and the broadcaster and journalist Jonathan Philbin Bowman.

== Life ==
Bowman was brought up in Ballsbridge in south Dublin. His father worked for Great Southern Railways (later CIÉ) and his mother was a nurse, originally from County Monaghan. Bowman was educated at Belvedere College and Trinity College Dublin where he received a bachelor's degree in history and political science in 1970 and a PhD in political science in 1980. He joined Radio Éireann in 1962, later becoming the presenter and commentator on numerous current affairs programmes, as well as an analyst of political developments and interviewer of politicians on radio and later on television. In the 1980s, he presented the current affairs programme Today Tonight, the precursor to Prime Time.

Bowman has won two Jacob's Awards for his radio broadcasting, in 2016 and 2013 the latter for his presentation of the current affairs programme, Day by Day. In April 2008, he commented on RTÉ television coverage of the state funeral of Patrick Hillery, a former President of Ireland.

Bowman chaired the audience-participation political programme Questions and Answers on RTÉ One television for 21 years, the final edition airing on 29 June 2009. He is the presenter of Bowman: Sunday: 8.30 (previously Bowman Saturday) on radio, a weekly compilation of material from broadcasting archives at home and abroad.

In May 2009, he was elected as an honorary fellow of Trinity College Dublin.

In May 2011, he fronted RTÉ television coverage of Queen Elizabeth II's visit to Ireland.

Bowman wrote a history of RTÉ Television called Window and Mirror. RTÉ Television: 1961-2011. It was launched by Taoiseach Enda Kenny at the National Museum in Dublin on 23 November 2011.

In January 2019 he was awarded the Freedom of the City of Cork.

== Activism ==
Bowman served a two-year term as president of The Irish Association for Cultural, Economic and Social Relations from 1991 and of Comhar, an environmental pressure group, from 1999 until 2004 .

== Personal life ==
He is married to psychiatrist Eimer Philbin Bowman and they have had four children: Jonathan, Emma, Abie and Daniel. His eldest son Jonathan Philbin Bowman, a journalist, television and radio presenter, died in an accident in March 2000. His daughter Emma Philbin Bowman works in Dublin as a psychotherapist. His middle son, Abie Philbin Bowman, is a columnist for The Dubliner magazine and a stand-up comedian, while in 2005 his youngest son Daniel initiated Be Not Afraid; a charity wristband campaign which raised over €80,000 in aid of Turning the Tide of Suicide and the Irish Red Cross and later set up a youth marketing firm, Spark.

== Publications ==
- De Valera and the Ulster question, 1917-1973 (1983) – ISBN 0-19-822776-0, ISBN 978-0-19-822776-2 – won the Christopher Ewart-Biggs Memorial Prize
- Portraits: Belvedere College, Dublin, 1832-1982 (1982) – ISBN 0-7171-1235-7
- Jonathan: Jonathan Philbin Bowman – memories, reflections, tributes (2002) – ISBN 0-9541488-0-0
- The Election Book, Reminiscences of an on-the-run Psephologist (2007) – ISBN 1-84717-031-5
