= Today Tonight (Irish TV programme) =

- Genre: News and current affairs
- Presented by: Brian Farrell; Barry Cowan; Olivia O'Leary; Pat Kenny; John Bowman
- Country of origin: Ireland
- Original language: English

Production
- Production locations: RTÉ Television Centre, Donnybrook, Dublin 4, Ireland
- Editor: Joe Mulholland
- Camera setup: Multi-camera
- Running time: 30 minutes

Original release
- Network: RTÉ One
- Release: 6 October 1980 – 27 August 1992

Related
- Frontline (Ireland); Prime Time, Farrell

Today Tonight is an Irish news and current affairs programme noted for its in-depth analysis, robust cross-examination of senior politicians and investigative reporting. The programme was broadcast on RTÉ One for the first time on Monday 6 October 1980.

Brian Farrell, Barry Cowan and Olivia O'Leary were the three original presenters. They were subsequently joined by others such as Pat Cox, John Bowman and Pat Kenny. All of these presenters later went on to hold other positions in RTÉ Television. Today Tonight was broadcast from Monday to Thursday on RTÉ One after the main evening news and restored the station's reputation for current affairs broadcasting following the demise of 7 Days in 1976. The last edition of the programme was broadcast on 27 August 1992 and was replaced by Prime Time.

It won a number of Jacob's Awards.

An in-depth report into the 14 February 1981 Stardust fire broadcast by Today Tonight on 16 February 1981 led to a senior adviser of Taoiseach Charles Haughey accusing RTÉ of undermining the Stardust Tribunal.
