= St. Leo's College =

St. Leo's College may refer to:

- St Leo's College, University of Queensland, Brisbane, Australia
- St. Leo's College, Carlow, Ireland, a girls' school
- St. Leo's Catholic College, Wahroonga, Sydney, Australia, a school

== See also ==
- Saint Leo University, Florida, USA, previously known as Saint Leo College
