= Godfrey Graham =

Irish cricketer (1936–2026)

Personal information
- Full name: Godfrey Richard Graham
- Born: 23 August 1936; Dublin, Irish Free State
- Died: 28 July 2026 (aged 89); Dublin, Ireland
- Batting: Right-handed
- Bowling: Leg break googly

Domestic team information
- Years: Team
- 1954: Ireland

Career statistics
Competition	First-class
Matches	1
Runs scored	1
Batting average	–
100s/50s	–/–
Top score	1*
Balls bowled	138
Wickets	2
Bowling average	50.00
5 wickets in innings	–
10 wickets in match	–
Best bowling	2/100
Catches/stumpings	1/–
- Source: Cricinfo, 1 January 2022

Godfrey Richard Graham (23 August 1936 – 28 July 2026) was an Irish cricketer. A right-handed batsman and right-arm fast-medium bowler, he played just once for the Ireland cricket team, a first-class match against Scotland in July 1954.

== Biography ==
Graham joined RTÉ Television shortly after it was launched as one of its first lighting cameramen. For the next 40 years, he worked on some of the station's most significant programmes, including Discovery and the visit to Ireland of US President John F. Kennedy.

In 1981, Graham won a Jacob's Award for his role as lighting cameraman on the RTÉ television production of Eugene McCabe's play Winter Music.

Graham died in Dublin on 28 July 2026, at the age of 89.
