= Abie Philbin Bowman =

Irish journalist and comedian (born 1969)

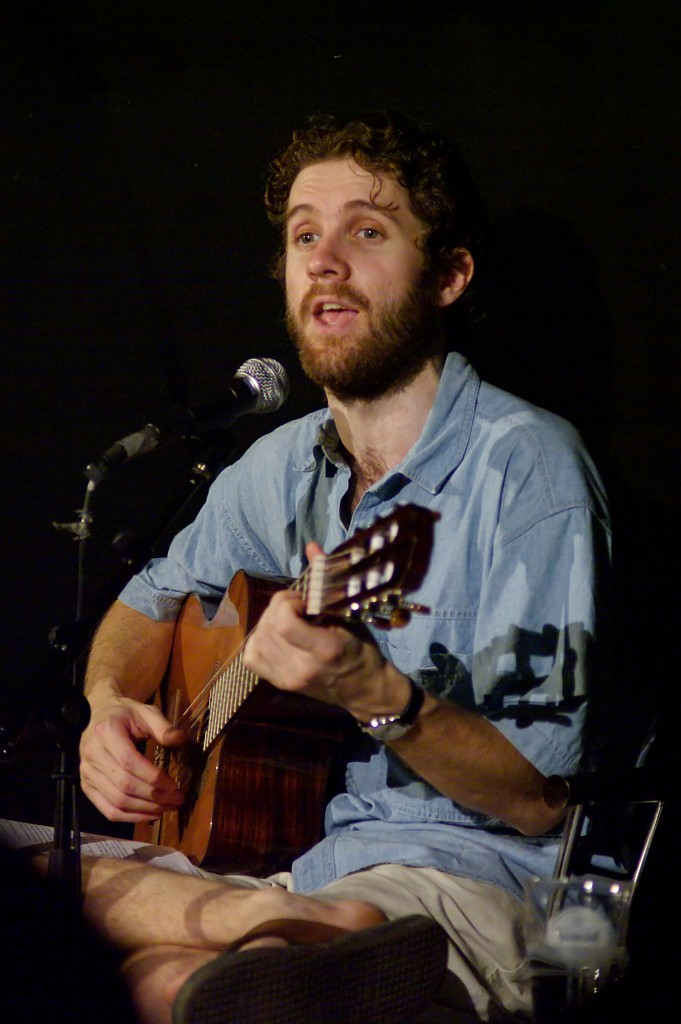
- performing Eco-Friendly Jihad
- Born: 28 July 1981 (age 45); Dublin
- Website: www.AbieLaughs.com

Abie Philbin Bowman (born 1981) is an Irish comedian and journalist. His One Man Shows include Jesus: The Guantanamo Years, Eco-Friendly Jihad and Developing the Country as a Hole. He worked on RTÉ programmes, including Arena, CAKE, Callan's Kicks and Irish Pictorial Weekly.

== Early career ==
Abie Philbin Bowman is the son of broadcaster John Bowman and the brother of deceased journalist Jonathan Philbin Bowman. With debating partner, Manus de Barra, Abie won the Leinster Schools, National Schools and International Observer Mace debating competitions in 2000. In 2002, he was elected a Scholar of Trinity College Dublin in History and English.

He wrote a regular column for The Dubliner magazine from 2001 to 2008.

== Comedy ==
Abie Philbin Bowman is the writer/director/performer of Jesus: The Guantanamo Years, which was staged in 2006 in the Project Arts Centre (Temple Bar, Dublin) and the Underbelly (Cowgate, Edinburgh) as part of the Edinburgh Fringe. The show was widely reported in the media and sold out – The Scotsman referred to him as "the face of this year's Fringe". In 2007, the show toured to London's West End, Jimmy Tingle's Off Broadway Theater in Boston, theatres across Ireland and the World Performing Arts Festival in Lahore, Pakistan. Performances in Belfast in Autumn 2007, were boycotted by Ian Paisley's Democratic Unionist Party.

Since then, Philbin Bowman has written, performed and toured a number of stand up shows including: Eco-Friendly Jihad (2008), ‘Sex, Lies and the KKK’ (2010); ‘Pope Benedict Bond Villain’ (2011); Stand Up Against the Bankers (with Aidan Killian), (2012); The IMF vs Jedward (2013) and Developing the Country as a Hole (2015). He continues to tour festivals around Ireland and further afield.

== TV & Radio ==
In November 2008, he began working in radio full-time. On the night Barack Obama was elected US President, Philbin Bowman interviewed the National Membership Director of the Ku Klux Klan on Irish radio station, i102-104. Later that month, he began hosting the main talk show – The Third i – on their sister station, i105-107. He hosted the Third i until May 2009.

In 2012, he took part in Ireland's Celebrity Mastermind, broadcast on TV3, raising money for Amnesty International. In the first round, his specialist subject was 'Monty Python's Life of Brian'. He scored 16 out of 16, and achieved the highest total score of any competitor in the first round. He reached the final, where he answered questions on ‘The Stupidity of Father Dougal Maguire' coming in second to the Series Winner, 2FM DJ Rick O'Shea.

Since 2012, Philbin Bowman has written for, and starred in, the satirical TV show, Irish Pictorial Weekly, in a number of roles. From 2013 to 2015 he was also a writer on Callan's Kicks on RTÉ Radio 1, and appeared briefly on the TV adaptation Callan Kicks the Year.

In 2013, he was the subject of an edition of Would You Believe, Nothing Sacred. The episode explored his approach to religious and political themes in comedy.

Since 2013 he has been a regular reporter on the RTÉ Radio 1’s flagship Arts Show, Arena. In August 2015, he hosted the show for the first time. In 2015, he hosted the first season of a new Children’s arts show CAKE – Culture and Arts for Kids and Everyone – on RTÉ jr Radio. The first season ran for 10 episodes.
