= Yves Rousseau =

French inventor and aviator

Yves Rousseau is a French inventor and aviator credited with multiple ultralight aircraft FAI world records. He has received international recognition for his 13 years of work on human-powered ornithopter flight. Rousseau attempted his first human-powered flight with flapping wings in 1995.

In 2005, Rousseau was given the Paul Tissandier Diploma, awarded to those who have served the cause of aviation in general and sporting aviation in particular, by their work, initiative, devotion or in other ways. After having made oscillate the wings of a hang glider, Yves mounted his patented flapping mechanism on a 'Vector' ultralight airplane and on 20 April 2006, at his 212th attempt, he succeeded in flying a distance of 64 metres, observed by officials of the Aero Club de France. Unfortunately, on his 213th flight attempt, a gust of wind led to a wing breaking up, causing the pilot to be gravely injured and rendered paraplegic.

Rousseau patented a few ultralight aircraft, including the wheeled prone ultralights Pulcim 220, the Pulcim 521 and a foot-launched powered hang glider harness called Relax 220.

== World records ==
FAI powered microlight world records by Rousseau
Place	Date	Aircraft	Class	Record
France	22 October 1989	Tecma – Colt Ascender	RWL1	Distance straight line & limited fuel: 397 km (247 mi)
France	16 July 1989	Tecma – Colt Ascender	RWL1	Distance closed circuit & limited fuel: 213 km (132 mi)
France	18 July 1992	Medium Ropuleim	RWF1	Altitude above sea level: 5230 m (17,159 ft)
France	18 July 1992	Medium Ropuleim	RWF1	Climb time to 3000 m: 24 min (410 ft/min = 2.08 m/s)
