= Bill Long (writer) =

Irish writer and broadcaster

- Born: 28 April 1932; Waterford, Ireland
- Died: 21 May 2010 (aged 78)
- Occupations: Writer, broadcaster
- Spouse: Peg
- Children: Four

Bill Long (28 April 1932 – 21 May 2010) was an Irish writer and broadcaster. He often featured on RTÉ Radio 1. He was also Ireland's longest surviving heart transplant patient.

== Early life ==
Long was born a Catholic in Waterford in 1932. He lived in a thatched house with his immediate and extended family, including his mother, father, brother and his mother's parents. His father was a grower of vegetables. Long was fond of reading as a child, devouring Henry David Thoreau, Henry Wadsworth Longfellow and Zane Grey, and encountering trouble at school while reading when he was supposed to be paying close attention to his religious studies. His time at a boarding school was funded by a family friend but he quit after two years. He attended a Congregation of Christian Brothers school in Tramore but quit that as well, at the age of 14. He married a wife, Peg, and they had two sons and two daughters.

== Career ==
After leaving school Long enlisted in the navy. He soon left that as well. He began reporting for the Cork Examiner, before transferring to a newspaper in Waterford and then onward to the Irish Press, followed by the Irish Independent and then The Irish Times and even briefly with Raidió Teilifís Éireann. He also worked in Revlon's public relations department. Long resided in London where Raymond Chandler was a next-door neighbour. The two shared in common a youth spent in Waterford so bonded well. Long also went on trips to the United States and South America. He met figures such as Thomas Merton and Katherine Anne Porter, the latter of whom encouraged him to write in earnest. So he left his job at Revlon. While writing he made radio documentaries to generate funds to feed his family. Among these are Singing Ark (which won a Jacobs Award) and the Dylan Thomas documentary Flowering Flood. He featured on RTÉ Radio 1's Sunday Miscellany. Long was also a homiletics lecturer at National University of Ireland, Maynooth (NUIM).

Bright Light, White Water, published in 1993, documented the history of every Irish lighthouse and their keepers off the Irish coast, with Long living inside Howth's Baily lighthouse while writing. He later had a heart attack and a heart transplant followed in 1994. The transplant and recuperation received public interest – RTÉ filmed a documentary and Long's book, Change of Heart, described what had happened and advocated increased donor awareness. He was able to write and edit further books, completing his first memoir shortly before his death in 2010.

== Bibliography ==
- Bright Light, White Water (1993)
- Change of Heart (1994)
- Brief Encounters: Meetings with Remarkable People (1999)
- Voices of Connemara (2009), with Raymonde Standun.
- The Lamp and the Lullaby; tales from a rural childhood (memoir) (2010)
