= Brian Farrell (broadcaster) =

English author & journalist

- Born: Bernard Brendan Farrell; 9 January 1929; Manchester, England
- Died: 10 November 2014 (aged 85); Dublin, Ireland
- Education: University College Dublin, Harvard University
- Years active: 1957–2004
- Spouse: Marie-Thérèse Dillon
- Children: 7

Bernard Brendan "Brian" Farrell (9 January 1929 – 10 November 2014) was an Irish author, journalist, academic and broadcaster. He presented programmes such as Today Tonight, and Prime Time on RTÉ.

== Early life ==
Born in Manchester, England to Irish parents, Farrell moved to Dublin, Ireland during the Second World War. He was educated at Coláiste Mhuire, Dublin; University College Dublin and Harvard University. He married Marie-Thérèse Dillon in April 1955 while attending Harvard.

== Family ==
He is survived by his wife Marie-Therese and seven children, Naomi, Bernard, Miriam, David, Rachel, Theo and Brian. Two of his sons followed him into academia: David Farrell is Head of the School of Politics and International Relations at University College Dublin, and Theo Farrell is the Vice-Chancellor at La Trobe University. Brian Farrell's wife, Marie-Thérèse, is the daughter of Dr. Theo Dillon, one of the sons of John Dillon the Irish nationalist politician. Her uncle was James Dillon, the Leader of the Fine Gael party from 1959 to 1965.

== Academic career ==
In 1955 he joined the administrative staff of University College Dublin became director of extramural studies and in 1957 assistant to the registrar. In 1966, he began lecturing in the Department of Ethics and Politics there and went on to become senior lecturer in politics. In the early 1980s, having run the Department of Ethics and Politics for a number of years since the death of the departmental head, Professor Rev Conor Martin, Farrell was controversially denied the post of department head and professor. The post instead was given to Professor John H. Whyte of Queen's University Belfast (QUB). In 1985 in compensation he was made Associate Professor of Politics, where he became the senior lecturer in Irish government. He retired from academia in the mid-1990s.

He wrote a number of books on Irish political history, including Chairman or Chief (regarding the office of the Taoiseach), The Founding of Dáil Éireann and a biography of Seán Lemass.

== Broadcasting career ==
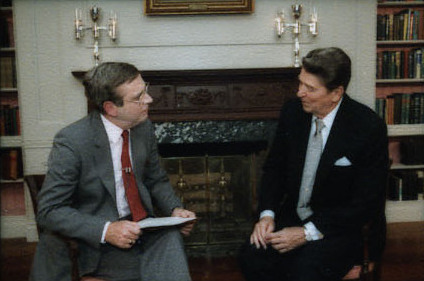
Farrell interviewing US President Ronald Reagan in 1984

Farrell also had a successful career as a media commentator. He wrote articles for The Irish Press and the Irish Independent. During the 1950s he worked with Radio Éireann and in 1962 he joined the newly established Irish television station, Telefís Éireann. He presented RTÉ's main programmed of comment and analysis - Broadsheet, Newsbeat, 7 Days, The Politics Programme, Frontline, Today Tonight, Farrell and Prime Time - into the new millennium. He also continued to work on radio from time to time until his retirement in 2004.

Farrell covered major events at home and abroad, starting with the visit of the American President John F. Kennedy to Ireland in 1963.

He presented the results programmed for ten Irish general elections. He interviewed several US Presidents, including this interview with Ronald Reagan in 1984.

Farrell was honored twice by the national press TV critics for his work in RTÉ current affairs programming. He received his first Jacob's Award in 1968 for his presentation of 7 Days. His second was awarded for his central role in RTÉ's coverage of the 1977 general election results.

In December 2000, he presented an Irish historical program 100 Years, a retrospective of events in Ireland over the 20th century.

In 2004 he presented a documentary Lights, Camera, Farrell!, that looks back at the election archives from television, highlighting some of the great moments from programmed and campaigns in Ireland.

== Death ==
On 10 November 2014, Farrell died after a long battle with Parkinson's disease at the age of 85, he was surrounded by his family.

President Michael D Higgins described Farrell as "an outstanding broadcaster and political commentator" who "set the standard for others to follow".

Prime Time presenter Miriam O'Callaghan said "Brian had a vast knowledge of Irish politics and history. He could reference events that happened 100 years ago as clearly if they had happened last week. But he never showed it off or flaunted it." Ms O'Callaghan went on to say that Farrell had the ability to "destroy and fillet politicians - but in the nicest possible way. There was no ego with Brian and that's very unusual in our industry. He was a true gentleman and one of the good guys".

Tánaiste Joan Burton said he was "a formidable interviewer for politicians to have to face".

RTÉ's Director General Noel Curran described Farrell as "a fantastic colleague. Wise, witty and supportive".

His Funeral Mass was held at 10.30am on Friday 14 November 2014 in the Church of the Holy Cross, Dundrum followed by cremation at Mt. Jerome, Harold's Cross.

== Publications ==
- Chairman or Chief? (Studies in Irish Political Culture), (1971), ISBN 0-7171-0535-0, Editor.
- Founding of Dáil Éireann, (1971), ISBN 0-7171-0536-9.
- Seán Lemass, (1983), ISBN 0-7171-1074-5.
- Communications and Community in Ireland, (1984), ISBN 0-85342-727-5.
- Consensus in Ireland: Approaches and Recessions, (1988), ISBN 0-19-827545-5, Foreword.
- Child Poverty in Ireland, (2000), ISBN 1-86076-183-6.

== See also ==
- Chaired a 1987 Debate between Garret FitzGerald and Charles Haughey
