= Paul Tansey =

Irish economist and writer (1949–2008)

Paul Anthony Joseph Tansey (17 August 1949 – 21 September 2008) was an Irish journalist and economics editor for The Irish Times.

Tansey was a former deputy editor of the Sunday Tribune and assistant editor of The Irish Times before becoming the paper's economics editor. He was educated at Blackrock College, Trinity College Dublin (TCD), where he edited Trinity News in 1970, and the London School of Economics (LSE). He earned an MBA from Trinity College in 1987.

Tansey collapsed on 21 September 2008, while playing tennis at the home of his friend, Senator Shane Ross, in Enniskerry. He was taken to hospital, but was pronounced dead. He was 59. He was survived by his wife, writer and broadcaster Olivia O'Leary, and their daughter, Emily. His funeral Mass was held in Monkstown.

Sean Barrett, an economist at Trinity College Dublin described Tansey as a "'dedicated writer' who 'stayed around until 1am' to make sure the newspaper was printed properly", in an interview with the RTÉ Radio 1 show, Morning Ireland.
