= Leo J. Enright =

Irish radio presenter

Leo J. Enright (born 18 March 1955) is an Irish radio broadcaster and news reporter. He is a member of the Board of Governors of the School of Cosmic Physics at the Dublin Institute for Advanced Studies.

== Early life and career ==
Leo Enright was born in London, but considers Dublin his home town. He was educated at St. Fintan's High School, Sutton and University College Dublin. As a Fellow of the World Press Institute, he studied American history, economics and culture at Macalester College, in St. Paul, Minnesota.

== Major achievements ==
In 1978, Enright won a Jacob's Award for his report on Dublin delinquents, broadcast on RTÉ Radio's This Week programme.

In 2000, with support from NASA's Astrobiology Institute, he completed the Workshop on Molecular Evolution at the Josephine Bay Paul Center for Comparative Molecular Biology and Evolution.

In 2008 he shared in a Thea Award for his work as science advisor on "Cosmos at the Castle", an interactive exhibition at Blackrock Castle Observatory exploring extreme life on earth and in space. The award was presented by the Themed Entertainment Association, a worldwide association of designers and producers of themed experiences such as museums, zoos and theme parks.
