= Glasheen =

Suburb of Cork city, Ireland

Glasheen An Glaisín
- Suburb
- Location in Ireland
- Coordinates: 51°53′11″N 08°30′52″W
- Country: Ireland
- Province: Munster
- County: County Cork
- Time zone: UTC+0 (WET)
  - Summer (DST): UTC-1 (IST (WEST))

Glasheen (Irish: An Glaisín) is a suburb in south central Cork city in Ireland. The area earned its name from the stream that flows through it, under the Glasheen Road. Glasheen means small stream in Irish. The local schools include Glasheen B.N.S and Glasheen G.N.S.

== People ==
The former Taoiseach Jack Lynch is buried in St. Finbarr's Cemetery on the Glasheen Road. Eddie Hobbs, the TV presenter on "Show me the Money" was born and reared in Glasheen, as was RTÉ presenter Bill O'Herlihy.

Glasheen BNS past pupils include sportsmen Jimmy Barry-Murphy (dual Cork hurling and football star), Michael Bradley (coach to the Connacht Rugby Team), and Neal Horgan (former player with Cork City Football Club).

== See also ==
- List of towns and villages in Ireland
