= Hilary Boyle =

Journalist, broadcaster, and activist

- Born: Hilary Joyce Thompson; 25 October 1899; London, England
- Died: 21 October 1988 (aged 88); Bray, County Wicklow, Ireland
- Known for: Activism
- Spouse: Charles Boyle (m. 1921; div. 1950)
- Children: 4

Hilary Joyce Boyle (née Thompson; 25 October 1899 – 21 October 1988) was a journalist, broadcaster, and activist.

== Biography ==
Born on 25 October 1899 in London, she was the second child of Winifred Helen Thompson (née Hopkins) and Gerald Alexander Thompson, vicar of St Gregory's church, Canterbury, and canon of Canterbury Cathedral. Boyle received her education in an all-girls school in South London. In 1921 she married a British Army officer, Lt-Col. Charles Leofric Boyle and through his postings spent time in Ireland, Jamaica, Malta and India between 1925 and 1935.

Boyle moved back to England from India and subsequently settled in Ireland. She separated from her husband in 1935 and they finally divorced in 1950 and her husband married again. They had four daughters and eventually she was estranged from them also. She lived in Ballsbridge and later Cabinteely for most of her life in Ireland.

Boyle became a Roman Catholic but later left it to join the Communist Party of Ireland. She was involved in a number of activist activities including the Dublin Housing Action Committee and the anti-Vietnam-war campaign. She ensured that she marched both north and south of the border on various protests. She was involved in the Irish Anti-Apartheid Movement and homeless work.

Boyle also wrote for the Woman's Way magazine as a gardening editor as well as various other articles. She also wrote to the Irish Times letters page and for RTE Radio's Sunday Miscellany. Boyle was a guest of the Late Late Show more than once. Boyle wrote Every Common Bush. A Book of Flower Legends for Children which was published in 1947. Boyle died on 21 October 1988 in the Arras retirement home, Bray.
