= Madeleine O'Rourke =

Irish aviator

- Born: Madeleine Byrne; 1951; Dublin, Ireland
- Died: 2 June 2006 (aged 54–55); St Vincent's Hospital, Dublin

Madeleine O'Rourke (1951 – 2 June 2006) was an Irish aviator, aviation events organiser, and sound engineer.

== Early life and family ==
Madeleine O'Rourke was born Madeleine Byrne in 1951 in south Dublin. Her parents were Olive (née Poole) and Peter J. Byrne, who was an electrical engineer with the ESB. The family home was on Lansdowne Road, Dublin. She had one older brother. During the 1930s, her mother had been an amateur tennis champion at junior and senior level. She married Colm O'Rourke on 17 November 1972 in St Mary's church, Haddington Road, Dublin. They were both sound engineers in RTÉ. They had one daughter, Marguerite.

== Flying career ==
O'Rourke attended an air show in Ballyfree, County Wicklow, when she was 16 and was "completely hooked" on aviation. She joined the Irish Aero Club in 1971, one of only 6 women in the membership of 200. She was appointed social secretary, and when finances allowed she took flying lessons. She took her first solo flight in July 1972. She joined the Dublin Ballooning Club (DBC) with her husband in 1975, and later joined the Irish Ballooning Association. She became the secretary of the DBC in 1987, helping in the production of a short history for its ten-year anniversary. In her capacity as a DBC official she attended Irish Aero Club board meetings. She volunteered to be the organising secretary of a fundraising air show which had been proposed. O'Rourke and a team of volunteers staged the Air Spectacular, in Fairyhouse, County Meath, on 27 August 1978 as her first event for a budget of £500.

O'Rourke and her team would organise increasingly complex and popular shows over the next 9 years. At first with small budgets, and later with sponsorship from Aer Rianta and British Airways. The early shows took place on racecourses and small airfields with poor infrastructure. These shows entailed partnering with air traffic control in Dublin Airport. During the first event, this was done from a payphone by a volunteer with a pocketful of 10p coins. Later events took place on Baldonnel airfield, which had better facilities, but still required logistics of parking, ticketing, catering, and toilets for over 100,000 visitors. They were complex events, for which O'Rourke acknowledged that the organisers needed "the patience of a saint, the arms of an octopus, and nerves of steel."

During the 1987 event, O'Rourke worked with the RAF, making the visit of the Red Arrows to Baldonnel the first time since 1922 that the RAF officially visited the Irish state. Having achieved this, O'Rourke stepped back from airshow organising. She continued her involvement in aviation, and was the first woman to fly a microlight in Ireland on Sandymount Strand in June 1980. In the same year, she became the first secretary of the Irish Microlight Aircraft Association.

She wrote Air Spectaculars: air displays in Ireland (1989), and produced a 75th-anniversary history of the Irish Air Corps in 1997. For the 2000 Air Spectacular she compiled a souvenir programme. She produced a number of videos on the history of flight, with one such video from 1990 being widely shown in schools. Another such production was to mark the 50th anniversary of an RAF crash in Wicklow in 1941. She worked with schools on educational events as part of her role in the Irish Aviation Council regarding "air education". She was a researcher and assistant for a wide range of RTÉ radio programmes, with particular interest in aviation history, the most notable of which was the four-part Spreading our wings aired in October 2005 and presented by Gay Byrne. She was a regular contributor to the Sunday Miscellany radio, and wrote many letters to newspapers on the topic of aviation. Another series, Home Grown Wings (1998), focused on the Society of Amateur Aircraft Constructors. She wrote a Masters thesis Flying for the Silver Screen and the Irish Story for an MA in Film Studies. She had a particular interest in the early Irish aviator, Lilian Bland, which led her to founding a project to bring all material relating to Bland together.

O'Rourke was awarded the Paul Tissandier Diploma by the Fédération Aéronautique Internationale in 1980, for her contributions to Irish sport aviation. The World Aerospace Education Organization gave her their award in 1992 for leadership in aerospace education. In 1994, she was elected a member of the Royal Aeronautical Society. She died on 2 June 2006 in St Vincent's Hospital, Dublin. Her husband donated her library to the Air Corps Flying Training School, which is now displayed at the Air Corps College.
