= Rachel Burrows =

Irish actress, broadcaster and teacher

- Born: Rachel Dobbins; 29 April 1912; Limerick, Ireland
- Died: 15 April 1987 (aged 74); Dublin, Ireland
- Spouse: Rev. George Henry Jerram Burrows

Rachel Burrows (29 April 1912 – 15 April 1987) was an Irish actress, broadcaster, and teacher.

== Biography ==
Rachel Burrows was born in Limerick on 29 April 1912. She was the daughter of the county surveyor for County Clare, Peter Le Fanu Knowles Dobbin, and his second wife Kathleen (Kitty) (née Vance). She was descended from Richard Brinsley Sheridan and James Sheridan Knowles. She grew up in Kilkishen House, County Clare and attended St Brandon's School in Bristol. Burrows attended Trinity College Dublin (TCD), graduating with a BA with first-class honours in 1933, followed by an M.Litt. in 1947. While attending TCD she was one of the founding members of the Dublin University Players. On 28 April 1934, she married the Rev. George Henry Jerram Burrows (died 2003), the former headmaster of the Cork grammar school and canon of the cathedrals of St Fin Barre and Ross. The couple had two daughters. From 1937 to 1947 she taught English in Limerick, before moving with her family to Cork, where she taught at the Cork grammar school until 1971, and becoming well known in the amateur theatrical community. She was a member of Ashton Productions, and she was key to the establishment of Cork's Everyman Theatre. Burrows was a founding members of the Limerick and Cork Alliance Française.

The Burrows moved to Dublin in 1971, where she retired from teaching in 1972, and took up acting professionally, working on radio, stage and television. She appeared in numerous productions by Micheál Mac Liammóir and Hilton Edwards, including The good natured man and An ideal husband. As part of the 1973 Dublin Theatre Festival, she performed in Lord Arthur Savile's crime by World Theatre Productions. Her most notable roles were in RTÉ's The Riordans as Miss Benson, and as Lady Bracknell in The importance of being earnest by Oscar Wilde. The 1980 production of this play in Cork was her last stage appearance. Burrows was a regular contributor to RTÉ Radio's Sunday Miscellany with reflections drawn from family diaries recalling life as a Protestant in southern Ireland in the 19th century. She was an authority of the work of Rabindranath Tagore, with her tribute to him being included in the 1962 publication by University College Cork to mark the centenary of his birth.

Burrows died in Dublin on 15 April 1987. She donated her notebooks to the Library of Trinity College Dublin which include notes she took in TCD during a series of lectures by Samuel Beckett, which are now kept in manuscript collections of the Library.
