= Melosina Lenox-Conyngham =

- Born: 22 February 1941; Ceylon (now Sri Lanka)
- Died: 1 October 2011 (aged 70); Waterford, Ireland
- Occupations: Explorer, writer
- Relatives: Gerald Lenox-Conyngham (great-uncle); Hubert Butler (uncle); Sophia Grene (niece)

Melosina Lenox-Conyngham (22 February 1941 – 1 October 2011) was an Irish explorer and writer.

== Early life and family ==
Melosina Anne Lenox-Conyngham was born in Ceylon on 22 February 1941, the daughter of Gerald Hamilton Lenox-Conyngham and Joanna ('Joan') Vernon Butler. Her father, a tea planter in Wattegoda, was a nephew of Sir Gerald Lenox-Conyngham. A maternal uncle was Hubert Butler. The family evacuated from Ceylon in advance of a Japanese invasion to Salisbury, Southern Rhodesia, with her father serving with the Royal Naval Volunteer Reserve. Her brother, Vere, was born in Rhodesia in August 1942. The three then lived near Durban, South Africa for two years. Her sister, Eleanor, was born in 1946. Towards the end of World War II, the family returned to Ceylon, where Lenox-Conyngham began her schooling. She was later sent as a boarder to a finishing school, Brondesbury-at-Stocks, Hertfordshire, England, taking some French classes in the University of Grenoble, and holidaying with relatives in Ireland.

== Career ==
Lenox-Conyngham held varying positions in a number of countries: a ski bum in Mount Snow, Vermont, secretary to the editor of a farmers' journal, a tennis coach in a hotel in Miami, Florida, and was employed for a period as the secretary to Sir Geoffrey Agnew, an antiques dealer, in London. She inherited Lavistown Cottage, County Kilkenny from an uncle and aunt, living there permanently from around 1973. From here, she rode with the Kilkenny Hunt. She continued to travel, living for months at a time in places such as Afghanistan, Malaya and China, generally travelling alone and on a whim.

In Ireland, she became interested in local and family history, encouraged by her uncle Hubert whom she lived near. He had founded the Butler Society, and she served as secretary of many years. She attended international Butler gatherings, and some 1976 to 2009 she was key to organising the Irish triennial gatherings of members of the society. These events were attended by Butler descendants from all around the world. She was a regular contributor to RTÉ Radio's Sunday Miscellany and other shows in the 1980s. Her interest in family history and her travels provided subject matter for her Irish Times articles which were published throughout the 1990s. She had a particular interest in historical diaries, and traveled Ireland in search of unpublished examples. This resulted in her 1997 book, Diaries of Ireland: an anthology, 1590–1987.

She was first diagnosed with cancer in 2007, and when in remission, she continued to travel and write. Obituaries in her writing style were published by the Irish Times, The Times and The Daily Telegraph up until her own death. Lenox-Conyngham died in Waterford Regional Hospital on 1 October 2011, and is buried in Ennisnag churchyard, County Kilkenny. A volume of her essays, A life in postcards (2013), was edited by her niece Sophia Grene. A large collection of family papers collected by Lenox-Conyngham is now held by Kilkenny Archives Ltd.
