= Bill O'Herlihy =

Irish television broadcaster (1938 – 2015)

- Born: 26 September 1938; Glasheen, Cork, Ireland
- Died: 25 May 2015 (aged 76); Dublin, Ireland
- Education: St. Finbarr's College
- Occupations: Sports broadcaster, public relations executive
- Years active: 1965–2014
- Notable credit(s): • Newsbeat • 7 Days • RTÉ Sport
- Spouse: Hilary
- Children: 2

Bill O'Herlihy (26 September 1938 – 25 May 2015) was an Irish television broadcaster and public relations executive. He was best known for his broadcasts for Raidió Teilifís Éireann (RTÉ), primarily in politics and sport. A presenter for ten FIFA World Cups and ten Summer Olympic Games, O'Herlihy was noted for his "Okey doke" catchphrase. He retired from RTÉ following its coverage of the 2014 FIFA World Cup. According to the Irish Examiner newspaper, "with the possible exception of Michael O'Hehir, Bill O'Herlihy was the broadcaster most universally welcome in Irish homes over the last 50 years."

== Early life ==
Born and raised in Glasheen in Cork city, O'Herlihy was the son of a local government official and the grandson of William O'Herlihy, a Cork Examiner news editor. He was educated at Glasheen boys' national school and later at St. Finbarr's College, Farranferris.

== Print journalism ==
After finishing his schooling at fifteen, O'Herlihy followed his grandfather into journalism and secured a job in the reading room of the Cork Examiner. He was only seventeen years old when he subsequently became sub-editor of the Evening Echo, a position he held for five years. He also graduated to the positions of news, features and sports reporter.

== Broadcasting ==
In the early 1960s O'Herlihy began his broadcasting career when he started to do local soccer reports from Cork for Radio Éireann. In 1965 he made his first television broadcast in a programme commemorating the sinking of the Lusitania off the Cork coast. After three years O'Herlihy was asked to join RTÉ's current affairs programme 7 Days to add the required field-reporting skills to the studio-based interviews. The programme had a reputation for its hard-hitting investigative reporting and he reported on many varying stories from illegal fishing in Cork to the outbreak of the crisis in Northern Ireland. In November 1970 the 7 Days programme came into controversy when O'Herlihy reported a story on illegal money lending. The report was unconventional as it was one of the first television pieces to use hidden cameras, it claimed the government were not responding to illegal moneylending. A tribunal of inquiry would follow, and O'Herlihy was forced to move away from current affairs.

Following this controversy, while O'Herlihy wasn't sacked (as he had fifteen months left on his contract with RTÉ), he was moved to the RTÉ Sports department - where he worked under Michael O'Hehir, who disliked O'Herlihy and his broadcasting style. In spite of this O'Herlihy fronted RTÉ's television coverage of the Olympic Games that year. He also became involved in the production of various sports programmes.

O'Herlihy was not long in the RTÉ Sports department when he became a regular presenter for such programmes as Sunday Sport and Sports Stadium. In 1978 he became RTÉ Soccer host alongside Eamon Dunphy, in 1984 John Giles joined the panel and Liam Brady did in 1998. Since 1974 Bill became RTÉ's chief sports presenter for such events as all Olympic Games until 2012, FIFA World Cups until 2014, UEFA European Football Championships until 2012 and European and World Track and Field Championships. He hosted RTÉ highlights of the Ryder Cup in 2006 when it was at the K Club in Ireland and continued to present coverage of Ireland's soccer internationals for RTÉ, along with Eamon Dunphy, Johnny Giles and Liam Brady.

He hosted RTÉ's coverage of rugby union in the 1980s and early 1990s. However, when RTÉ attained the rights to cover the English Premier League in 1992, Tom McGurk took over as host of RTÉ's coverage of rugby union. O'Herlihy covered the Premier League, Irish Internationals and the Champions League before dropping the Premier League in 2008. He continued to cover the Olympic Games and International Athletic Championships such as the European & World Athletics. He presented the first Rugby World Cup on RTÉ television in 1987 and, with Jim Carney, co-presented the first edition of The Sunday Game in 1979.

In 2012, while covering Chloe Magee's progress at the 2012 Summer Olympics O'Herlihy remarked that badminton was once considered "a mainly Protestant sport". RTÉ subsequently received a number of complaints, and while Magee criticised the remarks, the argument was made that the incident inadvertently reflected a complex historical reality.

O'Herlihy presented RTÉ Sport's coverage of the 2010 FIFA World Cup, his ninth FIFA World Cup. He fronted 18 European Championships and FIFA World Cups for RTÉ, the last of which came in 2014. This proved to be the final tournament with O'Herlihy at the helm; he retired at its conclusion and died the following year.

At the time of his death, O'Herlihy was working on a sports version of Reeling in the Years, which RTÉ immediately cancelled.

== Public relations and political advice ==
As a result of the fallout of the 7 Days tribunal, O'Herlihy appeared to quit journalism altogether in 1973, and established a new public relations company called Public Relations of Ireland (O'Herlihy Communications). In 2004, the Sunday Independent reported that O'Herlihy had lobbied on behalf of an Irish company, Bula Resources which was adversely affected by sanctions on Iraq. Environmental lobbygroup and charity An Taisce also claim that O'Herlihy's company, on behalf of a client, was involved in lobbying for controversial rezoning of land at Cherrywood in Dublin. O'Herlihy's PR consultancy was also involved in lobbying for the tobacco industry in Ireland, which came under scrutiny for attempts to influence government health and budget policy.

O'Herlihy had grown up in a family that had strongly supported the Fine Gael party and, in 1977, he became a media adviser to the party. He fulfilled that role for much of the next decade and was one of Garret FitzGerald's "handlers" during his two terms as Taoiseach in the 1980s.

== Death ==
O'Herlihy attended the 12th Irish Film & Television Awards on Sunday 24 May 2015. He died the following day at the age of 76 nearly a year after his retirement. He was survived by his wife Hillary and daughters Jill and Sally. Johnny Giles, Liam Brady and Eamon Dunphy appeared on The Late Late Show in tribute later that week.
