= Paul Tissandier =

French aviator

- Paul Albert Gaston Tissandier
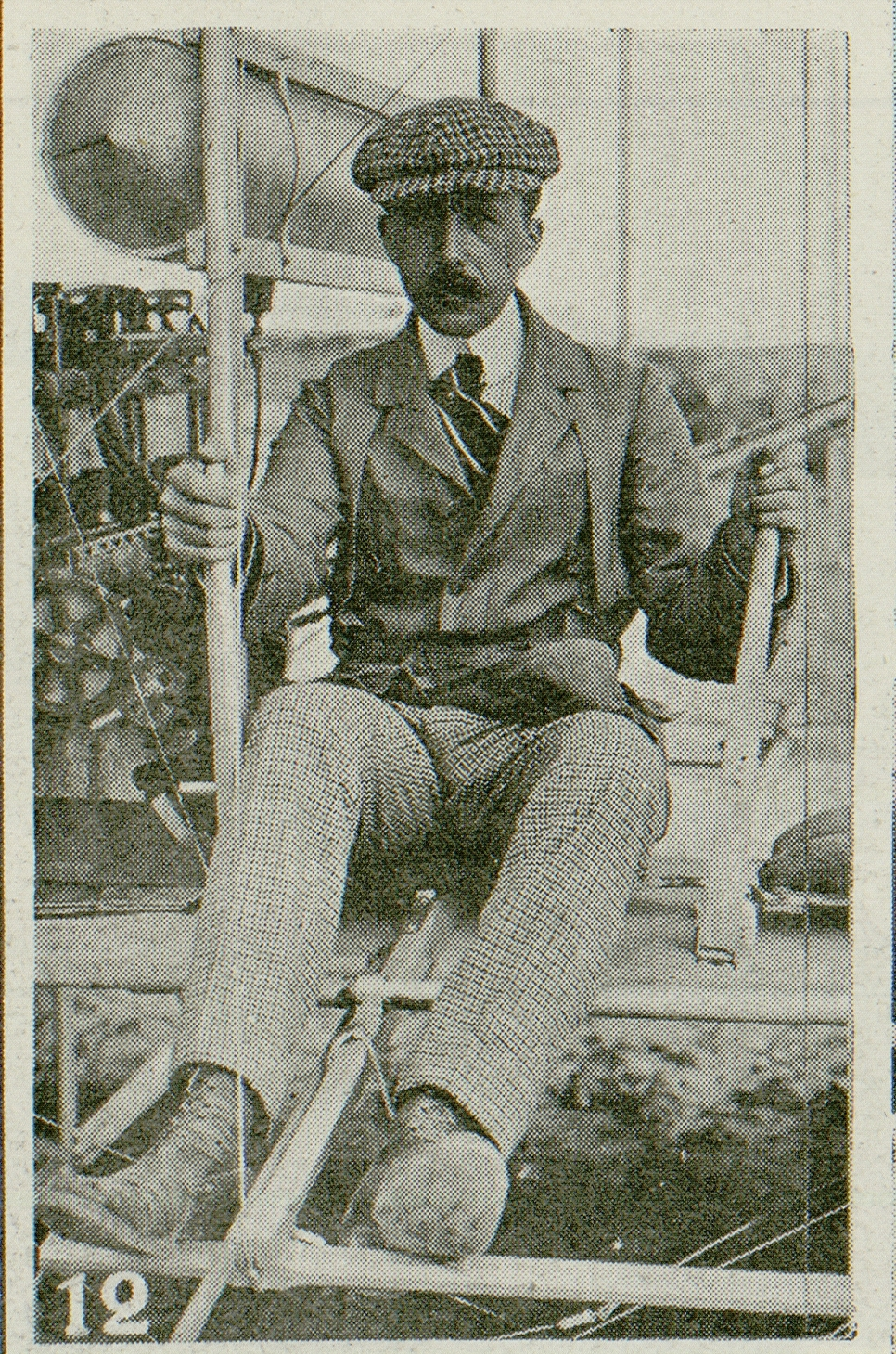
- Born: February 19, 1881; 1st arrondissement of Paris
- Died: March 11, 1945 (aged 64)
- Awards: Legion of Honour

Paul Tissandier (19 February 1881 – 11 March 1945) was a French aviator. He was the treasurer of the Fédération Aéronautique Internationale (FAI) from its foundation (1905) to 1919, and its Secretary General from 1913 to 1945, and it awards the Paul Tissandier Diploma every year in his honor.

== Biography ==
Tissandier was the son of aviator Gaston Tissandier and nephew of Albert Tissandier, Gaston's brother.

Tissandier began his flying career as a hot air balloon pilot and later moved to airships and finally to airplanes. He was a pilot-pupil of Wilbur Wright. Together with Count Charles de Lambert, he was involved in the construction of hydro-gliders.

The Aero Club Paul Tissandier based at the Saint-Cyr-l'École airfield was named in his honour.

== Paul Tissandier Diploma ==
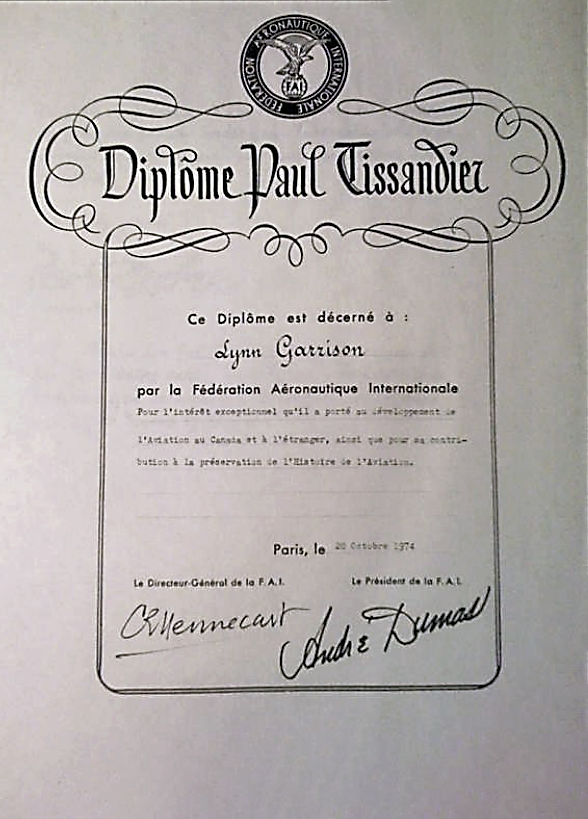
Paul Tissandier Diploma awarded to Lynn Garrison

The Paul Tissandier Diploma is a perpetual international award established in 1952 by the Fédération Aéronautique Internationale in memory of Tissandier who was Treasurer of the FAI from its foundation to 1919 and its Secretary General from 1913 to 1945. The diplomas are awarded to those persons who have served the cause of aviation and private and sporting aviation in particular, by their work, initiative, devotion or other endeavours.

Each Aero club which is a member of FAI may recommend a number of deserving candidates for the diploma each year; the U.S. is allowed three. The recipients are confirmed by the FAI Administrative Council and publicly announced and the Diplomas are awarded at the annual FAI General Conference.

=== Recipients ===
Notable recipients include:

- Marina Afrikanova – Soviet glider pilot, FAI world record holder
- Stéphane Cantin - Helvético-Canadien, Instructeur parapente et paramoteur vivant au Québec (2025)
- Alessandro Bianchi – Italian Minister for Transportation
- Paul Bikle - current world-record holder for height gain in a glider
- Ivo – Slovenian producer of ultralight and light aircraft
- Walter J. Boyne – US Air Force combat veteran
- Lynn Garrison – Canadian aviator and mercenary
- Nick Goodhart – British world gliding champion, record breaker and engineer
- Jerzy Makula – Polish world glider champion
- Yves Rousseau – French aviation pioneer
- Kathy Sutton – Canadian world sky diving champion
- Roger Poncelet – third-generation Belgian wooden aeroplane and propeller manufacturer
- Nabil Baz – Egyptian aviator
- Svetlana Kapanina – Russian aerobatic pilot
- Stewart Wood – President of the Experimental Aircraft Association of South Africa, 1992–2002
- Madeleine O'Rourke – Irish aviator and organiser of air shows in Ireland
- August Christov Kabaktchiev – a Bulgarian colonel-general, athlete and deputy minister of defence of Bulgaria, 1960–1972
- Božo Grubić – Serbian modeler and world free-flight champion

== Gallery ==
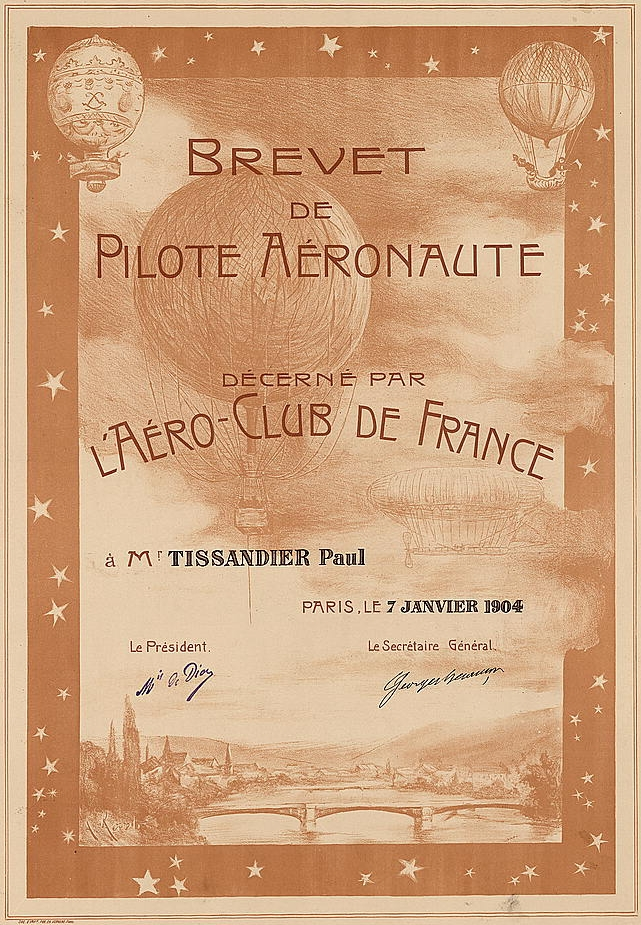
Balloon pilot's licence issued by the Aéro-Club de France to Tissandier in 1904

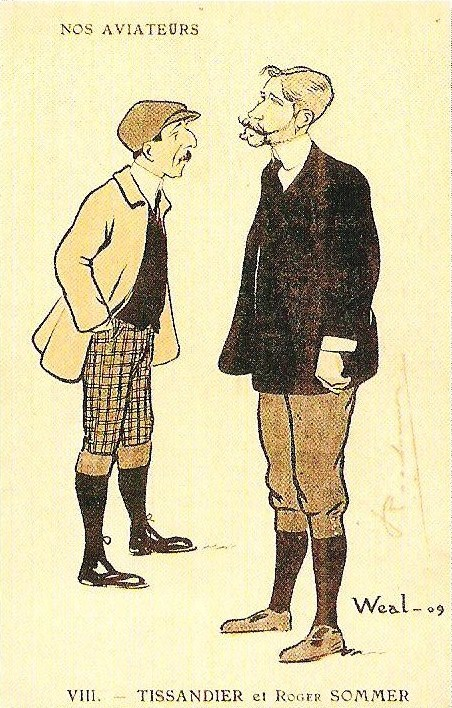
Caricature of Tissandier and Roger Sommer
