= Joe Mulholland (managing director) =

Irish television executive (1940–2026)

- Born: 1940; Ballybofey, Ireland
- Died: 31 January 2026 (aged 85)
- Occupations: Film editor, business executive
- Known for: Managing Director of RTÉ Television
- Spouse: Annie Vuillemin (m. 1968; died 2025)

Patrick Joseph Mulholland (October 1940 – 31 January 2026) was an Irish television executive. He served in a number of capacities with national broadcaster RTÉ, including as managing director of RTÉ Television.

== Early life ==
Mulholland was born in Stranolar near Ballybofey, County Donegal. Growing up in poverty, he survived diphtheria, while his father spent much of the year away from home, working on building sites in England. Mulholland was educated at Finn College in Ballybofey, having won a scholarship to attend the privately run school. He later moved to London, working in a variety of jobs until he secured a third-level place in the De La Salle Teacher training college in Manchester. After graduation in 1964, Mulholland travelled to France to study drama and work.

== Career ==
Mulholland returned to Ireland in 1970 and secured a place on the first trainee TV producer/director course at RTÉ. His first assignment was in Irish language programming, working on TV shows including Féach. Mulholland was later promoted to head of current affairs in 1980, during which time he launched the broadcaster's flagship current affairs programmeToday Tonight. Mulholland became Director of News in 1990, later serving as controller of programmes, before being appointed managing director of RTÉ Television. He retired from that position in October 2000. Mulholland later produced a number of documentaries.

== Personal life and death ==
Mulholland met his future wife, Annie Vuillemin, during his studies in France. They married in Donegal in 1968, spent the early years of their marriage in France before returning to Ireland in 1970. Mulholland's wife predeceased him in August 2025.

Mulholland died on 31 January 2026, at the age of 85.
