= Frankie Byrne (broadcaster) =

Irish broadcaster

Frankie Byrne

Frankie Byrne (27 December 1922 – 11 December 1993) was an Irish public relations consultant and broadcaster.

== Early life ==
Byrne was born into a successful family of journalists from Dublin. Cared for by servants, from a young age Byrne felt like she wasn't loved as much as the other children in the family. She was the middle child with two brothers and two sisters. The eldest sister was named Olive, followed by Michael, Brian and Esther. Frankie attended boarding school in Rathfarnham. Byrne had a limited relationship with her parents. Her father was a racing journalist and broadcaster who lived in the Gresham Hotel on O’Connell street where his job at Radio Éireann was located. Frankie became addicted to nicotine and alcohol. Other family members also struggled with addictions: her siblings Olive and Mick died from alcoholism, and Brian also had a drinking problem.

== Career ==
In the late 1940s, Frankie Byrne worked at the Brazilian embassy in Dublin. She was a pioneer in Irish radio and her program the “Agony Aunt” led to public confessionals on the radio. She wrote an Agony Aunt column for the Evening Press during the same period. She was best known for her 22 years of the radio program ‘Dear Frankie’. On the show she gave relationship advice to listener requests. Dear Frankie sponsored by Jacobs paved the way for the contemporary radio programs such as The Gerry Ryan Show and RTÉ's Liveline with Joe Duffy.

Dear Frankie was broadcast from 1963 to 1985. Dear Frankie opened with the words, ‘Welcome to Women’s Page, a program for and about you’ The program began as a 15-minute question and answer format on household issues but soon became a radio program that allowed people to share confidences and seek advice. Frankie shared household problems with her listeners ranging from jealous husband to lovelorn teenagers. Frankie claimed she knew nothing about domestic science but that she did know about love. Byrne advised on domestic relationships while living a life of turmoil. The most unique feature of Dear Frankie was that the program set people to talking, and helped begin a national conversation on the lonely struggles of generations of Irish women.

== Personal life ==
Byrne never married but had a 25+ year relationship with Frank Hall the satirist and columnist for the Evening Herald. Their relationship had been disputed by some family members who denied they had a child together and that the couple were just good friends. Nevertheless, in the middle of this relationship, Byrne became pregnant in the mid-50s, giving birth to their daughter Valerie on 12 July 1956. Byrne wanted to keep the baby but ultimately gave her up to St Clare's Orphanage in Stamullen. She frequently visited her baby daughter until she was eventually adopted some 15 weeks later, going to a family who went on to adopt four more children Frankie's relationship with Frank Hall came to an end in the mid-70s. Frankie, who had struggled with alcoholism for many years, stopped drinking in the mid-70s, was subsequently prescribed Valium and was addicted to the drug for the remainder of her life.

== Later life and death ==
Byrne and her daughter were reunited a decade before Byrne's death. “My mother – my real mother – was very supportive”, Byrne's daughter said.“She had some information that helped, but she didn’t give it to me until just before I was married, when I was 20, and I just kept that information that I had and tracked her down about seven years later.” Frankie and Valerie met on 13 December 1983; the last time Valerie saw her was exactly ten years later, on 13 December 1993, in the mortuary in St Vincent's Hospital.

Byrne died at the age of 71 from Alzheimer's disease in St Vincent's Hospital, Dublin, on Saturday 11 December 1993. Tributes were paid by colleagues and friends including the RTE assistant Director-General, Mr Bobby Gahan, who described the late Ms Byrne's voice as "one of the greatest sounds of radio". Others who paid public tribute to her include fellow broadcasters Larry Gogan and Gay Byrne.

== Legacy ==
Frankie Byrne is remembered as an influential force during the time of her radio show, and it has been said that ‘whole generation’ can ‘hum the signature tune to Frankie Byrne’s radio program’. When Frankie Byrne died in 1993 there was an outburst of support. Gay Byrne described her as having been “A national institution who had been loved by everyone”. Dear Frankie, is often credited as the first 'agony aunt’ radio show program format in Ireland.

Frankie’s talk show and life inspired numerous pieces of literature including a stage production in 2010 and 2012, authored by Niamh Gleeson and produced by the Five Lamps Theater Company, which told the story of her ‘tragic and secretive life’. She was also the subject of a book published in 1998, which compiled the advice which she gave on Dear Frankie. In 2006, RTÉ aired a documentary on Frankie Byrne, in which they explored her life following the show, and included interviews with Frankie's family and friends, including her daughter Valerie.

Frankie Byrne is also famous for having been the first woman to found a Public relations company in 1963, that worked almost exclusively in promoting Jacob's, including the annual Jacob's Awards ceremony for excellence in Irish broadcasting.
