= Andy O'Mahony =

Irish broadcast journalist (born 1934)

- Born: 23 August 1934 (age 92); Clonmel, County Tipperary, Ireland
- Education: Trinity College Dublin, University College Dublin, Harvard University
- Occupation: Broadcaster

Andy O'Mahony is an Irish broadcast journalist who worked for RTÉ (Raidio Telefís Éireann) from 1961 to 2013. He was one of the network's first television news anchors, and thereafter was a radio and television host of various long-running series. He also made radio and television programmes for BBC between 1977 and 1988, including a number of television arts documentaries for BBC Two.

The programmes he was most closely identified with over the years consisted of a number of book-based radio series for RTÉ. Series such as Books and Company, Off The Shelf and Dialogue provided a regular forum for the discussion of ideas in economics, politics and culture. From 1988 to 2000, he presented The Sunday Show, a current affairs talk show for RTÉ Radio 1. He earned four Jacob's Radio Awards (1969, 1981, 1986, 1989).

A lifelong book collector, he donated his personal library in February 2015 to the Glucksman Library at the University of Limerick. This collection of over 7000 volumes reflects the donor's various interests, ranging from philosophy, religion and literature to economics, politics and the history of ideas.

His autobiographical memoir Creating Space: The Education of a Broadcaster was published by the Liffey Press in 2016.

== Background, education and research interests ==
Born in Clonmel, County Tipperary in 1934, O'Mahony is the eldest child of Andrew O'Mahony, a local retailer and his wife Nora Collins, who was widowed in 1943. Early schooling by the Christian Brothers at St. Mary's was followed by a year at the High School Clonmel. His secondary education continued at Mount St. Alphonsus in Limerick, a Redemptorist boarding school where he studied Latin and Greek (1947–51). At the Royal Irish Academy of Music in Dublin he was a student of the British baritone Dennis Noble. He graduated in commerce and public administration from Trinity College Dublin (1961) and in philosophy and logic from University College, Dublin (1965). He has a PhD in psychology from Trinity College Dublin and was a visiting fellow in the Department of Philosophy at Harvard University (1982–83).

== Early career with the Bank of Ireland ==
After a year's clerking with Clonmel Foods Ltd, in County Tipperary in 1952/1953, he worked for the Bank of Ireland from 1954 to 1961. During his last year in banking, he was also a part-time announcer/newsreader with Radio Éireann.

== Broadcasting career with RTÉ ==
In November 1961 he joined Radio Éireann as a radio announcer/ newsreader. Two years later he became a news anchor with Ireland's new television service, Telefís Éireann (later RTÉ). In that first decade of broadcasting, he also presented arts and music programmes on radio. In 1972, he quit radio and television news to concentrate on feature programmes and pursue academic research interests.

=== Radio ===
His many radio series included Focus, Music and Musicians, Opera and the Singer (1968–1972), Involvement (1972–1973), Lookaround (1972–1978), Beckett at 70 (1976), Inside Europe (1978–1979), Bookweek (1980–1982), Introspect (1982) Books and Company (1985–1988), The Sunday Show, (1988–2000) Na Taoisigh (2001), 30 Years in the European Union (2002), Off The Shelf and Dialogue (1978–2013). One-on-one Dialogue guests over a 25-year period included : Eric Hobsbawm, Denis Donoghue, Richard Hoggart, Gerald Barry, Karlheinz Stockhausen, Nuala Ni Dhomhnaill, Nuala O'Faolain, Terry Eagleton, Roger Scruton, Hans Kung, John O'Meara, Michael Dummett, Anthony Kenny, John Gray, Shirley Williams, Garry Hynes, Simon Callow, Fiona Shaw, John Moriarty, Chris Patten, James Lovelock, Margaret Drabble, Richard Kearney, Mary Midgley, Roy Foster and Richard Sennett.

=== Television ===
His television work included The Course of Irish History (1966); National commentary for Our World (1967); Over the Barricades (1975); Predicting the Future (1979); Opening of the National Concert Hall in Dublin (1981); Wednesday Plus (1983); Crosscurrents (1985); High Profile (1986/1987); Guest Host on The Late Late Show in 1989; 20/20: Predicting the Future (1999).

== BBC Broadcasts ==
=== Radio ===
Various arts documentaries for BBC Northern Ireland from 1977 to 1987, including profiles of Brian Friel, Sean O'Faolain, Benedict Kiely and Richard Condon; documentary about religion for Radio 4 in 1986.

=== Television ===
For BBC, Northern Ireland, a six-part series, Widows of Writers (1977). Lifetimes, (1978–1986) a studio interview series with writers, artists and scholars, including Seamus Heaney and Seamus Deane. Also, for the BBC Gallery series, conversations with the novelist William Trevor and the classical scholar, E.R. Dodds.

For BBC Two, documentary profiles of the playwright, Seán O'Casey (1980), the tenor, John McCormack (1984), and the inventor, Harry Ferguson (1984). Studio interview with writer, Christabel Bielenberg about life in 1930's Germany (1987).

== Publications ==
- Irishness in a Changing Society ISBN 0-86140-245-6 (Princess Grace Library, Monaco,1988)
- The Dolmen Press: A Celebration, ISBN 1-901866-75-0 (Dublin, 2001)
- Collective Memory in Ireland and Russia ISBN 5-8243-0810-1 (Rosspen, Moscow, 2007)
- The Irish Reader: Essays for John Devitt ISBN 978-0-9555025-1-4 (Dublin, 2007)
- Dialogue with Gillian Rose, philosopher/social theorist in the journal Culture, Theory and Society (Sage. L.A., 2008)
- Creating Space: The Education of a Broadcaster ISBN 978-1-908308-93-1 (Liffey Press, 2016)
