= Olivia O'Leary =

Irish journalist and writer (born 1949)

- Born: 1949 (age 76–77)
- Education: St Leo's College, Carlow
- Alma mater: University College Dublin (UCD)
- Occupations: Journalist, writer and current affairs presenter
- Spouse: Paul Tansey (d. 2008)
- Children: 1
- Relatives: Oz Clarke (cousin)

Olivia O'Leary (born 1949) is an Irish journalist, writer and current affairs presenter.

== Education ==
Educated at St Leo's College, Carlow, and at University College Dublin (UCD), she worked with the Nationalist and Leinster Times in Carlow. In the late 1970s, she began working for The Irish Times as parliamentary sketchwriter.

She currently broadcasts a weekly political diary on Drivetime, a radio programme broadcast by Raidió Teilifís Éireann's channel RTÉ Radio 1.

In 1972, she joined Raidió Teilifís Éireann (RTÉ) as a current affairs presenter and later worked as a presenter on Today Tonight, Questions and Answers and Prime Time. She became the first regular female senior presenter of the BBC's current affairs programme, Newsnight and also presented First Tuesday, a monthly documentary strand produced by Yorkshire Television for ITV.

She has co-authored the book Mary Robinson: The Authorised Biography, with Dr Helen Burke, and in 2004 wrote Politicians and Other Animals, a sketch on Irish politics.

O'Leary was Chairperson of the Office of the Ombudsman's 20th Anniversary Conference.

In 2009, she left the Roman Catholic Church over the cover-up of clerical abuse scandals and the long-standing refusal of the church to ordain women.

She was married to Paul Tansey, Economics Editor of The Irish Times. He died suddenly in September 2008. She has one daughter.

On 5 December 2011, O'Leary was awarded an honorary doctorate by her alma mater UCD. In 2017, Trinity College Dublin awarded her with an honorary doctorate.

She is a cousin of TV personality and wine expert Oz Clarke.

== Awards and honours ==
O'Leary won three Jacob's Awards during her broadcasting career with RTÉ. Her first came in 1973 for her work as a radio news reporter. In 1982, she won her second Jacob's Award for her hosting of Today Tonight. Her chairing of Questions and Answers brought her a third award in 1986. She has also won a Sony Award for her BBC Radio 4 programme Between Ourselves. In 2019, she was admitted as a member of the Royal Irish Academy.
