= John MacKenna =

Irish writer

John MacKenna (born 1952, Castledermot, Co Kildare) is an Irish playwright and novelist. He has produced multiple radio series, authored novels, and acted in theatre productions. MacKenna won the 1989 Jacob's award in the Radio category for How the heart approaches what it yearns.

== Biography ==
MacKenna taught for several years before working as a producer at RTÉ Radio from 1980 until 2002 when he left the station to spend more time writing and acting. While in RTE, he worked in several areas including music, education, current affairs, documentaries, features and religion. He lectures on Creative Writing at Maynooth University and runs a writer's group called The Hedge School. His most recent book The Lock-Keepers Wife was top of the Irish best sellers list this year.

== Radio series ==
MacKenna has produced several radio series, including work on the Amish people of Pennsylvania and the Shaker Community of Sabbath Day Lake. Some notable works include:

- Someone Has To Do It
- Secret Gardens of the Heart
- How The Heart Approaches What It Yearns, on songwriter Leonard Cohen, which won MacKenna the 1989 Jacob's Award

His radio play The Woman at the Window - based on the life of the Quaker writer Mary Leadbeater - was broadcast by RTÉ Radio and won a silver medal at the Worldplay Radio Festival in New York in 2007.

== Theatre work and plays ==
MacKenna was previously associated with the Meeting lane Theatre Company between 1980 and 2002. Currently, he writes for, directs, and acts with the Mend and Makedo Theatre Company in Ireland. His major works with the Company are:

- Breathless (2005 & 2010, directed by Petra Costigan-Oorthuijs and Richard Ball)
- My Father's Life (2006)
- We Once Sang Like Other Men (2009, directed by Marian Brophy)
- Redemption Song (2011, directed by Marian Brophy)
- Lucinda Sly (2015)

His theatrical work, Who by Fire, for the Water to Wine Theatre Company is based on the experiences of a Holocaust survivor. It uses the songs of Canadian songwriter Leonard Cohen to set the mood for a chilling exposition of the continuing threat of totalitarianism.

In 2008, his play Corner Boys (directed by Marian Brophy) toured the country. In 2017, his collaborative requiem with Leonard Cohen, Between Your Love and Mine, premiered at Áras an Uactaráin and toured nationally. In the autumn of 2019, the play was staged at the National Concert Hall in Dublin. His collaborative play with Angela Keogh, Jerusalem Tomorrow, toured in theatres across Ireland in 2018.

His one-man play, The Mental, directed by Angela Keogh and written and performed by MacKenna, premiered and toured across Ireland in the autumn of 2018 and spring of 2019.

== Publications (novels and poetry) ==
MacKenna has authored several novels:

- Clare, on the life of English poet John Clare, re-published in 2014 on the poet's 150th death anniversary (Irish Classics series, New Island Books, 1994)
- The Last Fine Summer (Picador, 1998)
- A Haunted Heart (Picador, 2000)
- The Space Between Us (New Island Books, 2009)
- Joseph (New Island Books, 2014)
- The Lock-keeper's Wife (Lilliput Press 2026)

Several of his novels have been translated with French, Italian, Chinese and Hungarian editions appearing

He has published five collections of short stories:

- The Fallen, won 1993 Irish Times Award for best first book of fiction (Blackstaff, 1992)
- A Year of Our Lives (Picador, 1995)
- The River Field (New Island Books, 2007)
- Once We Sang Like Other Men (New Island Books, 2017)
- We Seldom Talk About the Past (New Island Books, 2021)

He has written several volumes of poetry on a range of topics:

- Where Sadness Begins (Salmon Books, 2012)
- By the Light of Four Moons (Doire Press, 2015)

MacKenna has written multiple memoirs and biographies:

- Shackleton: An Irishman in Antarctica, on Antarctic explorer Sir Ernest Shackleton (University of Wisconsin Press, 2002)
- Things You Should Know (New Island Books, 2006)
- Absent Friend, on his thirty-year friendship with Leonard Cohen (The Harvest Press, 2023)
- Father, Son and Brother Ghost (The Harvest Press, 2024)

In 2016, his adaptation of Ernest Shackleton's South was published by Real Reads.

In October 2020, I Knew This Place - a collection of more than eighty of his essay contributions to the RTÉ series Sunday Miscellany, was published by The Harvest Press, which released a CD of MacKenna reading twenty-eight radio essays from I Knew This Place. His novel The Lock-keeper's Wife was published in 2026 (Lilliput Press)

== Other activities and recognition ==
MacKenna won the 1989 Jacob's Award in the radio category for his docu-series How The Heart Approaches What It Yearns. In 2014, MacKenna was short-listed for the position of Irish Fiction Laureate by the Arts Council, Ireland. His works have won the Hennessy Literary Award, the Irish Times Fiction Award, and the C Day-Lewis Award.

He teaches several media studies and creative writing courses at Maynooth University and at The Hedge School in Moone, Kildare.
