= Jonathan Philbin Bowman =

Irish broadcaster and journalist (1969–2000)

Jonathan Philbin Bowman (6 January 1969 – 3 March 2000) was an Irish journalist and radio broadcaster.

== Life and career ==
Born in Dublin in 1969, Jonathan Philbin Bowman, the son of the historian and broadcaster John Bowman, was educated at Sandford Park School and at Newpark Comprehensive School. He chose to leave formal education in his early teens, a decision he announced on The Late Late Show.

He mostly worked as a freelance journalist. He spend some time during his early career as a presenter on FM104 where he co- hosted a radio show called The Rude Awakening alongside Scott Williams, George Hellis and Margaret Callanan . He then joined The Sunday Independent newspaper as a columnist. He later presented television programmes on RTÉ, such as the quiz show Dodge the Question.

Bowman died in a fall at his home on Fitzgerald Street in Harold's Cross, Dublin, on 3 March 2000. Tributes were paid to him by party political leaders. He was survived by his parents, his sister Emma, his brothers Abie and Daniel and his only child Saul Philbin Bowman (Saul Mehigan).
