= RTÉ Libraries and Archives =

Irish media archive

- RTÉ Archives logo 2015
- Region served: Ireland
- Official language: English/Irish
- Website: www.rte.ie/archives/

The RTÉ Libraries and Archives are a collection of photographs, sounds recordings, video footage and written records (of articles such as scripts) in various formats across a wide range of topics pertaining to Irish life and society.

The collection is derived from the material used by Raidió Teilifís Éireann in their activities as national broadcaster for Ireland. As RTÉ is part funded by a licence fee from Irish householders with televisions, it has a responsibility to maintain and update this collection and make it available to the general public.

In common with most broadcasters, much of RTÉ's early material was never recorded, with tapes wiped for re-use or simply dumped. The remaining footage largely consists of random extracts, rather than complete series. However, they provide insightful examples of historical programming.

During Christmas 2021, more footage of clips, news, sports and programmes was added to mark 60 years of television. In December 2022, new collections were added, adding more news reports and programmes. In 2023, the online historical newspaper project Century Ireland, which had existed since 2012, ended.

In 2024, the complete events and reports of visits of Pope John Paul II in 1979, US President Ronald Reagan in 1984 and Russian President Mikhail Gorbachev in 1989 went online.

In 2026, RTÉ's coverage of the FIFA World Cup (1962-2022) went online, as did a number of series of Hall's Pictorial Weekly.

== Logo ==
The RTÉ Archives logo incorporates the current RTÉ corporate logo with a take on the 1967 corporate logo for the word archive. There are two versions of the logo; generally the first letter of the word archive is used but the full word is also used.

== See also ==
- Reeling in the Years
- TV50
