= 7 Days (Irish TV programme) =

Irish current affairs television programme (1966–76)

- Also known as: Seven Days
- Directed by: Eoghan Harris
- Presented by: Brian Cleeve; Brian Farrell; John O'Donoghue
- Country of origin: Ireland

Production
- Producer: Muiris Mac Conghail

Original release
- Network: Radio Telefís Éireann
- Release: 26 September 1966 – 1976

7 Days (previously Seven Days) is an Irish current affairs television programme presented by Brian Farrell, Brian Cleeve, and John O'Donoghue, and was broadcast on RTÉ One from 1966 until 1976.

== History ==
=== Background ===
Seven Days was created by RTÉ One as a replacement for the existing programme Sixty Six. It was developed at a time when the station was expanding its current affairs programming. Innovations included having TDs and senators from the political parties giving their opinions on Dáil proceedings instead of hearing from the political correspondents of the daily newspapers. Broadcast live on Monday evenings between 8:45pm and 9:15pm, it quickly became RTÉ's flagship current affairs programme. Seven Days was broadcast for the first time on 26 September 1966.

=== Presenters ===
John O'Donoghue, Brian Cleeve and Brian Farrell were the first presenters of the programme. The three had earlier worked on Telefís Éireann's first current affairs programme Broadsheet in the early 1960s.

=== Rebranding ===
In 1967 the programme was merged with another current affairs programme, Division, and rebranded as 7 Days. As a result of this amalgamation the team of presenters was expanded to include David Thornley, Ted Nealon, Bill O'Herlihy and Paddy Gallagher.

In 1968, it was announced that the current affairs programme, which often tackled subjects of public controversy in a forthright manner, was to be moved to the RTÉ News division. This led to a threatened strike and ultimately to the resignation of several of the programme's presenters.

7 Days was the first home-produced programme to be shown in colour by RTÉ, although colour transmissions of imports predated it.

=== Tribunal of Inquiry ===
In December 1969 the Oireachtas voted to establish a tribunal of inquiry regarding a 7 Days piece on money-lenders. The programme, which was filmed in part with hidden cameras and microphones, claimed that illegal moneylending was causing misery and that the State was not responding to it. The tribunal's terms of reference were:

- That the allegation of the use of strong-arm methods by unlicensed moneylenders was unfounded
- That the numbers and scale of illegal moneylenders operating in the country were far less than those suggested by the programme
- That the statements made in the programme purporting to be confessions by moneylenders as to strong-arm debt recovery tactics were entirely valueless

The tribunal concluded that the programme content had been exaggerated, although earlier claims that participants had been bribed with alcohol to respond to questions in a certain way were found to be untrue. Following the tribunal's report, comments critical of the manner of its establishment and the implications of the tribunal's conclusions were made in the Dáil on 25 February 1971 and 9 March 1971 by, among others, Barry Desmond and Garret FitzGerald.

=== Ending ===
7 Days was broadcast for the final time in 1976.
