= Hall's Pictorial Weekly =

Irish satirical television series (1971 to 1980)

- Cover of DVD The Very Best of Hall's Pictorial Weekly, Vol.1! released in 2004
- Also known as: Hall's Pictorial Weekly
- Genre: Satire
- Written by: Frank Hall
- Presented by: Frank Hall
- Starring: Frank Kelly; Eamon Morrissey; Paul Murphy; Pat Daly; Michael Twomey; Frank Duggan
- Country of origin: Ireland
- Original language: English
- No. of series: 9

Production
- Production locations: Studio 2, RTÉ Television Centre, Donnybrook, Dublin 4, Ireland
- Camera setup: Multi-camera
- Running time: 30–40 minutes
- Production company: Raidió Teilifís Éireann

Original release
- Network: RTÉ, RTÉ One
- Release: 29 September 1971 – 19 March 1980

Related
- Ballymagash

Hall's Pictorial Weekly is an Irish satirical television series broadcast on Raidió Teilifís Éireann from 1971 to 1980. Regarded as RTÉ's flagship comedy show, it featured satirical sketches on current news stories, politics and popular culture, as well as parody songs, comedy sketches, re-edited videos, cartoons and spoof television formats. The show was written, presented and edited by Frank Hall and featured a cast including Frank Kelly and Eamon Morrissey.

== History ==
=== Development ===
Hall's Pictorial Weekly had its origins in the daily regional news magazine Newsbeat, which ran between 1964 and 1971. The programme was noted for concentrating on colourful characters and off-beat reportage, as well as occasional comedy sketches. According to Hall, it occurred to him one day that he would be much more the master of the situation if he simply sat at home and wrote sketches, instead of looking for stories around the country.

=== Beginnings ===
The first episode of Hall's Pictorial Weekly aired on 29 September 1971. Set in the offices of a mythical provincial newspaper in the fictional town of Ballymagash, it initially continued to cover offbeat regional news in the manner of Newsbeat, but gradually gave over more time towards comedy sketches and parodies.

In testament to the show's popularity, the term "Ballymagash-style politics" quickly became common parlance as a shorthand way of describing the type of "parish-pump" politics which became one of its key satirical targets.

Every programme had a featured town or village at the start and the complete set of them will be online at RTÉ Archives in 2026.

=== Political satire ===
Hall's Pictorial Weekly was at its strongest during the 1973–1977 term of the Fine Gael-Labour Party coalition government. So sharp and constant was its satirical send up of the government ministers of the time, that it is generally accepted that the programme played an important part in bringing the coalition into disrepute and perhaps even contributed to bringing it down. Ireland at the time had a very volatile economic situation and the show spared no political expense in portraying the then Taoiseach, Liam Cosgrave, as the "Minister for Hardship," while the Minister for Finance, Richie Ryan, was portrayed as "Richie Ruin".

The show also portrayed the former Taoiseach Jack Lynch as a rather benign pipe-smoking figure, referred to as "the real Taoiseach". The political party he led, Fianna Fáil, was also lampooned as being called "Feel and Fall". Charles Haughey was parodied as "Charlie Hawkeye".

=== Title music ===
The title tune is called "Timothy" taken from the album "More Music From Peter Gunn", the soundtrack album for the American television series Peter Gunn, composed and conducted by Henry Mancini.

== Ending ==
In April 1980, RTÉ decided not to go ahead with the planned tenth series of Hall's Pictorial Weekly due for transmission in the following May and June. Effectively the show was axed, although no clear statement about the programme's demise was made by the broadcaster.

== Commercial release ==
In 2004, a DVD featuring highlights from the series was released under the title, The Very Best of Hall's Pictorial Weekly (Vol 1). A second volume The Very Best of Hall's Pictorial Weekly (Vol 2) was released a few years later.

== Broadcast dates ==
=== Series ===
Series	Year	Dates	No. episodes	Day	Time
Series 1	1971–72	29 September – 31 May	24 episodes	Wednesday	7:30pm–8:10pm
Series 2	1972–73	30 September – 26 May	25 episodes	Saturday	8:00pm–8:30pm
Series 3	1973–74	27 September – 23 May	30 episodes	Thursday	8:00pm–8:30pm
Series 4	1974–75	25 September – 7 May	27 episodes	Wednesday	8:30pm–9:00pm
Series 5	1975–76	25 September – 3 June	33 episodes	Thursday	9:00pm–9:30pm
Series 6	1976–77	6 October – 25 May		Wednesday	9:00pm–9:30pm
Series 7	1977–78	21 September – May		Wednesday	8:30pm–9:00pm
Series 8	1978–79	– 11 September July		Wednesday	8:30pm–9:00pm
Series 9	1979–80	31 October – 19 March		Wednesday	8:30pm–9:00pm

== See also ==
- List of satirical television news programs
