= Philip Young (security officer) =

South African convicted of murder

- Died: 9 March 2021; Cape Town
- Known for: Disputed conviction for murder in Afghanistan

Philip Young is a citizen of South Africa who was convicted of murder in Afghanistan.

== Incident and conviction ==
According to Young he was working in Afghanistan for Anham, a subcontractor of the Drug Enforcement Administration. Anham was a logistics supplier for the company. Young was Anham's deputy project manager for Afghanistan. He acknowledges shooting an Afghan on 1 October 2009—a former employee, but describes the killing as self-defense. Young was released from prison on 17 May 2012. In the Appellate Court Young was given sixteen years in prison. After the Appellate Court, Young was then represented by American Attorney Kimberley Motley in Afghanistan's Supreme Court. In the Supreme Court, Young's sentence was reduced to seven years in prison.

Young described disgruntled Abdul Ghafar, his former subordinate, opening fire on his vehicle, and that he had merely returned fire. The South African newspaper The Independent quoted Thinus Coetzee, of Amnesty International. He called Young's conviction "deeply flawed":

"The very section of the Afghan Criminal Code under which he was found guilty should have exonerated him on the grounds of self-defence. It was bizarre. None of the paperwork made any sense, so to this day we don't really know what crime he was convicted of."

== Imprisonment ==
Young described being held in a communal cell, with fifteen other men, during his pre-trial detention. He described being held with Taliban and al Qaeda suspects, and had been called upon to fight for his life with fellow prisoners.

Following his conviction he was held in a special counter-narcotics prison and in the Pul-e-Charkihi prison. Conditions improved there. Anham colleagues were allowed to bring him a birthday cake, although he wasn't allowed to eat any of it.

Ultimately, Motley lobbied for Young's early release from prison to the Afghan President Hamid Karzai and he served over two years in prison. His release followed a decree from Afghan President Hamid Karzai.
