= The Dubliner =

Magazine published in Dublin, Ireland (2001-2012)

The Dubliner was a city magazine based in and centred on Dublin, Ireland. It ceased publication in January 2012, eleven years to the day after the first edition in January 2001.

The Dubliner was originally published by Dubliner Media Limited, and came out ten times per year. Contents included human-interest stories, reporting, opinion, political and social commentary, and essays on Irish culture. It also included reviews of restaurants, books, music, comedy, theatre, cinema and art.

The magazine was bought by the VIP Magazine Group in December 2008. In March 2010, it was transformed into a weekly magazine distributed with the Thursday edition of the Evening Herald.

Graydon Carter of Vanity Fair described The Dubliner as "a fantastic publication" - but according to Trevor White it was "an instant failure", and within a few months it was close to bankruptcy. He struggled to keep the magazine afloat for eight years" before selling The Dubliner — and the associated restaurants guide — to magazine publisher Michael O'Doherty in November 2008. Shortly afterwards, O'Doherty explained, "The Dubliner is a magazine I've long admired. Launched nine years ago, shortly after VIP, it has a compact but loyal readership, and a reputation for top-class writing. Sure, it has featured the occasional 10-page yawn-fest about Aosdána, but now that I own the business, I can replace that with pictures of Twink."

In 2006, The Dubliner libelled Elin Nordegren, Tiger Wood's ex-wife, and printed nude photographs purporting to be of Nordegren. Nordegren sued the magazine, of which White was the publisher, in a Dublin court and won substantial damages.

== Regular features ==
"Capital Life" was a guide to Dublin music, theatre, food, drink, film, art, and comedy that appeared each week.

Contributors included Victoria Smurfit, Bono, Maia Dunphy, A. C. Grayling, Abie Philbin Bowman, Brendan O'Connor, Rosanna Davison, Shane MacGowan, Gavin Friday. Jean Butler, Quentin Fottrell, Domini Kemp, Paul Howard, John Stephenson, John Ryan, Gerry Stembridge, Irvine Welsh, John Banville, and Pauline McLynn.

== Dubliner of the Year Award ==
The 'Dubliner of the Year Award' was given to a person from Dublin each year by the magazine..

List of winners

Year	Winner	Achievement
2008	Brian O'Driscoll	Celtic League, and IRB International Try of the Year winner
2009	Ryan Tubridy	new host of The Late Late Show
2010	Bono	Lead singer of U2, campaigner

== Related events ==
Old City, New Dreams, was an annual event organised by the magazine featuring comedy, fashion, food and debates. The 2008 event took place in Dublin's Dundrum Town Shopping Centre. Speakers included Senator David Norris, newspaper columnist Ian O'Doherty, author Paul Howard and restaurateur Kevin Thornton.

In 2008 The Dubliner awarded the inaugural Dubliner of the Year Award to Irish rugby captain and former Lions captain Brian O'Driscoll.

== Staff ==
Martha Connolly was the last editor of the magazine; previous editors included Emily Hourican, Eoin Higgins, Nicola Reddy and founding publisher Trevor White. Paul Trainer was publishing manager, then managing editor of the magazine and The Dubliner 100 Best Restaurants book.

White reports the magazine's operation in The Dubliner Diaries.
