= Mo Cheol Thú =

- Genre: Music
- Running time: 45 minutes
- Country of origin: Ireland
- Language(s): English
- Home station: RTÉ Radio 1
- Hosted by: Ciarán Mac Mathúna
- Recording studio: Donnybrook, Dublin
- Original release: 1970 – 27 November 2005
- Website: www.rte.ie/radio1/mocheolthu/

Mo Cheol Thú (literally "you are my music": a traditional expression of praise in the south-west of Ireland for any outstanding feat), also carries the meaning "you are my darling" [Dinneen 1927 Edition p.186] and "I love you", was a radio programme of Irish traditional music broadcast by Radio Éireann (later RTÉ Radio 1) for three quarters of an hour each Sunday morning between 1970 and 2005.

One of Irish radio's longest running programmes and presented by broadcaster Ciarán Mac Mathúna, the series came to an end with Mac Mathúna's retirement in 2005. The last programme, beginning at 8.10 am, was broadcast on 27 November 2005. Mac Mathúna died just over four years later, on 11 December 2009.

The programme consisted of instrumental music and songs in both English and Irish as well as conversation between Mac Mathúna and various guests.
