= Phil Young (writer) =

Irish writer

- Born: Ireland
- Education: Trinity College Dublin
- Occupations: Biographer, short story writer
- Writing career
- Notable works: Patricia Lynch, Storyteller

Phil Young is an Irish writer of both fiction and non-fiction, noted for her 2005 biography of Patricia Lynch.

== Early life and education ==
Young is a native of Dunmanway in west Cork who later moved to in Dublin. She graduated from Trinity College, Dublin, with an MPhil in Anglo-Irish literature.

== Career ==
She has had a number of short stories and articles published in various magazines. She has also featured on the RTÉ radio programme Sunday Miscellany.

=== Notable work ===
Patricia Lynch, Storyteller, published by Liberties Press in 2005, is a biography of one of Ireland's most popular authors of children's books. Young discusses the author's life and work, shedding light on her relationship with her family and her husband, R. M. Fox, on her dealings with her various publishers, and on the creation of her many books. Although often overlooked in the past, Patricia Lynch is arguably the finest children's author Ireland has ever produced. Her writing includes The Turf-Cutter's Donkey, which was illustrated by Jack Yeats, and the Brogeen series.
