= Dick Warner =

Irish writer and environmentalist

- Born: Richard Warner; 19 July 1946; Ireland
- Died: 16 June 2017 (aged 70); Ballinasloe, County Galway, Ireland
- Education: Trinity College Dublin
- Occupations: Environmentalist, writer
- Known for: Presenter of Waterways

Dick Warner (19 July 1946 – 16 June 2017) was an Irish environmentalist, writer and broadcaster.

== Career ==
Warner was best known for presenting three series of the half-hour documentary programme, Waterways, in which he explored Ireland's canals by barge. Waterways was first broadcast in 1991 on Ireland's national TV station, Raidió Teilifís Éireann (RTÉ) and later transmitted internationally on channels such as Discovery and Channel 4.

In 1992, Warner won a Jacob's Award for Waterways.

He worked on over ninety other broadcast television documentaries, including Spirit of Trees and Ironing the Land. Warner also carried out work for the Central Fisheries Board, The Loughs Agency, The Office of Public Works, the National Botanic Gardens and Tourism Ireland

Warner wrote a weekly column for the Irish Examiner, published every Monday, and another season of Waterways began airing on RTÉ in 2011. Prior to its closure Warner wrote a column in the Evening Press.

Warner was a graduate of Trinity College Dublin where he studied English literature and German and started a lifelong association with the media when he edited the college newspaper.

He was married with two children and resided in County Kildare.

Warner died suddenly on 16 June 2017, after falling ill while travelling on a boat on the River Shannon near Ballinasloe.

== Bibliography ==
- Waterways: by steam launch through Ireland (1995)
- Voyage: Around the Irish Coast (1999)
- The Liffey: Portrait of a River (2008)
