= Sunday Miscellany =

Irish radio programme (1968–present)

- Genre: prose; poetry; music; Miscellany; music
- Running time: 50 minutes
- Country of origin: Ireland
- Language: English
- Home station: RTÉ Radio 1
- Hosted by: none
- Produced by: Sarah Binchy
- Recording studio: RTÉ Radio Centre
- Original release: 1968; 58 years ago
- Website: www.rte.ie/radio/radio1/sunday-miscellany/

Sunday Miscellany is an English-language Irish radio programme featuring new Irish writing of poetry and (mostly non-fiction) prose, broadcast on Sunday mornings on RTÉ Radio 1 since 1968. The programme does not have hosts, but contributions of writings read by the writers are intercut with related music. Contributors are a mix of established authors and poets and novices who have submitted their written works for consideration.

The standard format is pre-recorded, but frequently, versions of the programme have been recorded in front of a live audience with a chamber or full orchestra and vocalists.

A selection of pieces from the show, entitled Sunday Miscellany: A Selection 2018 – 2023, won an Irish Book Award in 2023.

The series had over 300,000 listeners in August 2024, beating presenter-led shows such as Sunday with Miriam and Liveline.

The opening theme was "Galliard Battaglia" by Samuel Scheidt from the show's beginning until 19 April 2026.

== Notable contributors ==
Contributors to the programme have included:

- Rachel Burrows
- Hilary Boyle
- Eric Cross
- Rachael Hegarty
- William Keohane
- Benedict Kiely
- Melosina Lenox-Conyngham
- Brian Leyden
- Bill Long
- John MacKenna
- Stella G. Mew
- Éilís Ní Dhuibhne
- Billy O'Callaghan
- Madeleine O'Rourke
- John Ryan
- Jessica Traynor
- Phil Young
- Seán J. White

== Bibliography ==
Selections of pieces performed on the show have been published.

- Heaney, Marie, ed. (2000). Sunday Miscellany:A Selection from 1995-2000. Town House. ISBN 9781860591341.
- Heaney, Marie, ed. (2004). Sunday Miscellany:A Selection from 2003 and 2004. Town House. ISBN 9781860592300.
- Ní Anluain, Clíodhna, ed. (2006). Sunday Miscellany:A Selection from 2004-2006. New Island Books. ISBN 9781905494132.
- Heaney, Marie, ed. (2009). A Treasury of Sunday Miscellany. New Island Books. ISBN 978-1848400504.
- Ní Anluain, Clíodhna, ed. (2013). September Sundays:As Heard on Sunday Miscellany. New Island Books. ISBN 9781848402782.
- Ní Anluain, Clíodhna, ed. (2019). Miscellany 50:Fifty Years of Sunday Miscellany. New Island Books. ISBN 9781848407473.
- Binchy, Sarah, ed. (2023). Sunday Miscellany:A Selection, 2018-2023. New Island Books. ISBN 9781848409040.
