= Michael McGovern (poet) =

American poet

Michael McGovern

Michael McGovern (1847 – 1933) was a working-class poet who gained national recognition in the late 19th and early 20th centuries. He was widely known as "the Puddler Poet", and his work reflected his support of labor unions.

Born in [Castlefield, Williamstown, County Galway], Ireland, McGovern emigrated first to England and then to the United States. He eventually settled in Youngstown, Ohio, along with his wife, the former Anne Murphy, and secured work in the local steel mills. McGovern rose to the position of puddler, a skilled laborer responsible for converting pig iron into wrought iron by removing impurities.

In 1899, McGovern secured national celebrity with the publication of Labor Lyrics and Other Poems. He went on to author a popular newspaper column in the Youngstown Daily Vindicator.

McGovern's poems fall into three basic categories: rolling mill rhymes, labor growls and miscellaneous trifles, and amorous verses "to show that a rolling mill man has a heart as susceptible to the purest motives of love as those who have millions wherewith to purchase a title".

Some scholars have argued that McGovern's work, which features religious themes, shows the influence of the Social Gospel movement. This intellectual movement drew sharp connections between social justice causes and the teachings of the New Testament.

== Related links ==
- Mahoning Valley Historical Society
- Ohio Memory
- Youngstown State University
