= St Leo's College, Carlow =

School in County Carlow, Ireland

St. Leo's College

Location
- Dublin Road; Carlow, County Carlow, R93 PW84; Ireland
- Coordinates: 52.8424°N 6.9227°W

Information
- Type: Secondary school
- Religious affiliation: Catholic
- Established: 1839; 187 years ago
- Founder: Sisters of Mercy
- Principal: Niamh Broderick
- Gender: Girls
- Website: www.stleoscarlow.ie

St. Leo's College is a girls' secondary school in Carlow, County Carlow, Ireland that was founded by the Sisters of Mercy in 1839.

== History ==
The school was built using funds provided by the Bishop of Kildare and Leighlin in the 1830s, Dr Edward Nolan. He invited nuns from the Sisters of Mercy to found a school, which he would fund the construction and maintenance of a new convent. The founding group of nuns arrived in Carlow on 10 April 1837 with Catherine McAuley. The new convent was blessed and opened on 1 July 1839. A pension school was opened on 1 May 1840.

The large section of the school, visible from Dublin Road, was opened in 1962 to mark the 125th anniversary of the school's foundation.

== Notable alumni ==
- Olivia O'Leary, journalist, writer and current affairs presenter
- Kathryn Thomas, TV presenter
