= Michael Viney =

British-born Irish journalist and nature writer (1933–2023)

Michael Viney MRIA
- Born: 6 February 1933; Brighton, England
- Died: 30 May 2023 (aged 90)
- Occupations: Writer; broadcaster; artist
- Spouse: Ethna McManus (m. 1965)
- Children: 1
- Writing career
- Subjects: Nature

Michael Viney MRIA (6 February 1933 – 30 May 2023) was a British-born Irish artist, author, broadcaster and journalist. Best known for his writings on nature, he contributed to The Irish Times from 1962.

== Early life and beginning of career ==
Michael Viney was born in Brighton, England on 6 February 1933, to parents who operated a cafe. Although interested in art as a career, he began work with the Brighton and Hove Herald at the age of 16, before stints at the Evening Argus, The Star, and Today. In 1962, he took a career break and moved to Tully Cross in Connemara, and eventually decided to stay in Ireland, performing freelance assignments for The Irish Times, later becoming a staff journalist.

== Career ==
=== The Irish Times and RTÉ ===
In the 1960s Viney wrote for The Irish Times about social issues such as the fate of people in institutional care. His articles were later incorporated into the Ryan Report on institutional abuse of children in Ireland.

Viney began working at RTÉ Television as a presenter in programmes aimed at social and consumer affairs and with items on household and family matters. He took training there as a TV director and became a production editor in 1976.

=== Move to Mayo ===
Viney left Dublin in 1977 with his wife, Ethna, and daughter for a simpler life in County Mayo, at their holiday home on one acre at Thallabawn, Murrisk, near the coast south of Louisburgh.

=== Nature writing ===
Viney published "Another Life", a weekly column in The Irish Times, from 1977. Over the years the focus of the column shifted from sustainability to natural history. His last column was published in February 2023.

== Personal life ==
Viney married Ethna McManus in 1965, and they had a daughter. He was an atheist.

Viney died on 30 May 2023, at the age of 90.

== Recognition ==
In 1966, Viney won a Jacob's Award for his RTÉ Television documentary, Too Many Children.

Viney was a member of Aosdána, Ireland's academy or affiliation of distinguished creative artists. He was elected to the Royal Irish Academy in May 2017.

== Bibliography ==
Viney's books include:

- Ireland: A Smithsonian Natural History. 2003
- Ireland's Ocean (co-written with Ethna Viney)
- 'A Year's Turning' 1996, The Blackstaff Press' 3 Galway Park, Dundonald, Belfast BT16 OAN.
