= Broadsheet (TV programme) =

Irish current affairs TV programme

- Created by: Telefís Éireann
- Presented by: John O'Donoghue; Brian Cleeve; Brian Farrell
- Country of origin: Ireland
- Original language: English
- No. of episodes: 393

Production
- Production locations: Studio 2, Telefís Éireann Television Centre, Donnybrook, Dublin 4, Ireland
- Camera setup: Multi-camera
- Running time: 35 minutes

Original release
- Network: Telefís Éireann
- Release: 1 January 1962 – 4 October 1963

Related
- Newsbeat

Broadsheet is a Telefís Éireann television current affairs programme presented by John O'Donoghue, Brian Cleeve, and Brian Farrell and broadcast in Ireland live on weekday evenings from 1962 to 1963.

== Background ==
Broadsheet was created by Telefís Éireann as the newly established station's flagship current affairs programme. Broadcast live from Monday to Friday between 6:40pm and 7:15pm, the new programme was in direct competition with BBC Television's Tonight programme. Broadsheet was broadcast for the first time on 1 January 1962, the first full day of programming by Telefís Éireann. It was edited by P. P. O'Reilly.

== Content and style ==
The programme was broadcast half-an-hour after the early evening news and provided a more detailed analysis of topical matters and current affairs. There was a mixture of incisive and light-hearted items: unscripted studio interviews and filmed reports. The programme received a Jacob's Award for broadcasting in 1962.

Broadsheet was broadcast for the last time on 4 October 1963. It was replaced by a new programme called Newsbeat, which effectively was a merger between News and Broadsheet.

The three presenters - O'Donoghue, Cleeve and Farrell - went on to play prominent roles in subsequent current affairs programmes on RTÉ right up until the 2000s.

== Other sources ==
- Dowling, Jack & Doolan, Lelia. Sit Down and Be Counted: The Cultural Evolution of a Television Station. Wellington Publishers (1969)
- Horgan, John. Broadcasting and Public Life: RTÉ News and Current Affairs 1926-1997. Four Courts Press (2004). ISBN 1-85182-839-7
- Bruce, Jim. Faithful Servant: A Memoir of Brian Cleeve. Lulu (2007). ISBN 978-1-84753-064-6
