= Frank Hall (broadcaster) =

Irish television broadcaster, journalist, and film censor (1921–1995)

- Born: Frank Hall; 24 February 1921; Newry, County Down, Ireland
- Died: 21 September 1995 (aged 74); Dublin, Ireland
- Occupations: Broadcaster, journalist, satirist, film censor
- Years active: 1962–1986
- Notable credits: Newsbeat; The Late Late Show; Hall's Pictorial Weekly
- Spouse(s): Aideen Hall, née Kearney
- Children: 5 with Aideen Hall; 1 with Frankie Byrne

Frank Hall (24 February 1921 – 21 September 1995) was an Irish broadcaster, journalist, satirist and film censor. He is best remembered for his satirical revue programme Hall's Pictorial Weekly.

== Early life ==
Born in Newry, County Down, Hall received little more than a primary education as he left school at the age of twelve to work in a local shop. He later worked as a waiter in London before moving to Dublin. On his return he joined the art department of the Irish Independent. Hall subsequently worked with the Evening Herald where he wrote a column on dance bands.

== Television ==
After that, he moved to RTÉ where he worked in the newsroom. He presented The Late Late Show for the opening of the 1964 season, but his lack of success in that seat led to the return of the previous presenter, Gay Byrne. From 1964 to 1971 he presented Newsbeat , a regional news programme. When Newsbeat ended, Hall started writing and presenting Hall's Pictorial Weekly, a political satire show that ran for over 250 episodes until 1980. A successor show, Hall and Company, ran from 1980 until Hall's retirement from television in 1986. He served as spokesperson for the Irish jury in the Eurovision Song Contest 1965 and 1966.

Hall won two Jacob's Awards, in 1966 and 1975, for his work on Newsbeat and Hall's Pictorial Weekly respectively.

== Film censor ==
In 1978, Hall was appointed Ireland's national film censor. During his period as censor he was known for his strict application of Irish censorship and his defence of family values. Among the films banned by him was Monty Python's Life of Brian, which he described as "offensive to Christians and to Jews as well, because it made them appear a terrible load of gobshites".

== Family controversy ==
Hall had a long running affair with the well known agony aunt, Frankie Byrne, with whom he had a daughter, who was given up for adoption shortly after her birth in 1956. In the 2006 RTE screening of Mint Production's documentary Dear Frankie, Frank was named as the father of Frankie's daughter though this was disputed at the time by Hall family members. In 2010, a play written by Niamh Gleeson, also entitled Dear Frankie, opened in the Liberty Hall theatre. Later in 2012, it opened again in the Gaiety Theatre, going on to play in theatres across the country.

== Death ==
Hall died of a heart attack in Dublin in 1995. He is buried in Dardistown Cemetery in North Dublin.

Media offices
Preceded by Gay Byrne	Host of The Late Late Show; 19 September 1964 – 19 December 1964	Succeeded by Gay Byrne
