= Newsbeat (Irish TV programme) =

- Created by: Telefís Éireann
- Presented by: Frank Hall; Michael Ryan; Cathal O'Shannon
- Country of origin: Ireland
- Original language: English

Production
- Running time: 20-40 minutes

Original release
- Network: Telefís Éireann
- Release: 7 September 1964 – 11 June 1971

Related
- Broadsheet

Newsbeat is a Telefís Éireann television current and regional affairs programme, presented by Frank Hall, and broadcast in Ireland live on weekday evenings from 1964 until 1971.

== Background ==
Newsbeat was created by Telefís Éireann as a replacement for the station's flagship current affairs programme Broadsheet. The programme was originally broadcast live from Monday to Friday between 6:01pm and 6:40pm. It was the first television programme by Telefís Éireann to be jointly produced by the News and Programming divisions of the new station.

== Content and style ==
The programme opened with a ten-minute summary of the news and, unlike Broadsheet, concentrated on more off-beat and light-hearted regional filmed reports and unscripted interviews from around Ireland. Frank Hall, as well as being editor of the programme, was also the main presenter. He was assisted in reporting duties by Michael Ryan and Cathal O'Shannon.

News and Newsbeat were subsequently split into two separate back-to-back programmes before the latter found a regular 25-minute slot weekdays at 7:00pm. Newsbeat was broadcast for the last time on 11 June 1971.

== Presenters ==
Frank Hall later went on to present the satirical programme Hall's Pictorial Weekly while Michael Ryan went on to present Nationwide until December 2011.
