= John O'Donoghue (TV presenter) =

British broadcaster

John O’Donoghue (6 October 1931 – 11 September 2014) was a broadcaster. He grew up in Milltown, County Kildare, and studied history at University College Dublin. He worked as a schoolteacher then trained as a barrister, but pursued a career in broadcasting instead.

O'Donoghue joined Telefís Éireann in the early 1960s, and presented the new station's first current affairs programme, Broadsheet. He also presented Irish television’s first coverage of a general election count in 1965, from a special "elections newsroom" in Studio One. O’Donoghue then went on to present the popular current affairs programme 7 Days, which went on air in 1966 and ran for ten years. His later work included the regional news and features programmes Next Stop in the 1970s and Ireland’s Eye (1980–83).
