= Nuala O'Faolain =

Irish journalist and writer (1940–2008)

- Born: 1 March 1940; Dublin, Ireland
- Died: 9 May 2008 (aged 68); Dublin, Ireland
- Resting place: Kilbarrack Cemetery
- Education: University College Dublin; University of Hull; University of Oxford
- Occupations: Academic; TV producer; journalist; writer
- Writing career
- Notable works: Are You Somebody? (1996); Almost There (2001); My Dream of You (2003); The Story of Chicago May (2005)
- Notable awards: Jacob's Award (1985); Prix Femina étranger (2006)

Nuala Brigid Anne O'Faolain (Note: /ˈnuːlə oʊ ˈfweɪlɑːn/ NOO-lə oh-FWAY-lahn) (1 March 1940 – 9 May 2008) was an Irish journalist and writer. Her debut memoir, Are You Somebody?, published when she was in her mid-fifties, became a sensation in Ireland and a worldwide bestseller.

Born to a Dublin family with a journalist father who led a bohemian lifestyle, O'Faolain grew up poor and isolated. After studying English literature and spending time as an academic, she worked as a TV producer for the BBC and RTÉ, before becoming a newspaper columnist at The Irish Times in 1986. Her writing frequently touched on the role of women in Irish society.

Originally written as an introduction to a book of her columns, Are You Somebody? was first published in 1996 and was the number-one bestseller in Ireland for five months. In 1998, it topped the New York Times bestseller list. O'Faolain wrote two further non-fiction works: a second memoir, Almost There; and a biography, The Story of Chicago May, which won the Prix Femina étranger. She also published two novels, My Dream of You and Best Love, Rosie, the latter of which was released posthumously.

While being interviewed by her friend Marian Finucane on radio in April 2008, O'Faolain announced that she had been diagnosed with terminal cancer; she died four weeks later. She is regarded as one of the finest Irish writers of her generation, and has influenced the memoir form in Ireland.

== Early life and career ==
Nuala O'Faolain was born in Dublin on 1 March 1940, the second of nine children to Tomás O'Faolain (Note: Tomás O'Faolain was sometimes known as Thomas Phelan.) (1911–1980) and Kathleen O'Sullivan (1915–1985). Originally a schoolteacher and Army lieutenant, under the pen name Terry O'Sullivan, her father became a prominent social diarist for the Evening Press in Dublin; he was distant from his children and engaged in extra-marital affairs which produced at least two half-siblings. Despite earning as much money as the newspaper's editor, Douglas Gageby, he did not share his income with his family. "He was a dapper, clever, reticent man and he treated the family as if he had met them at a cocktail party," O'Faolain wrote of him in her memoir. The family lived in poor conditions, frequently going hungry; her mother became an alcoholic. O'Faolain's sister Noreen recalled their mother going to the pub every day at 4 p.m. and not returning home until midnight.

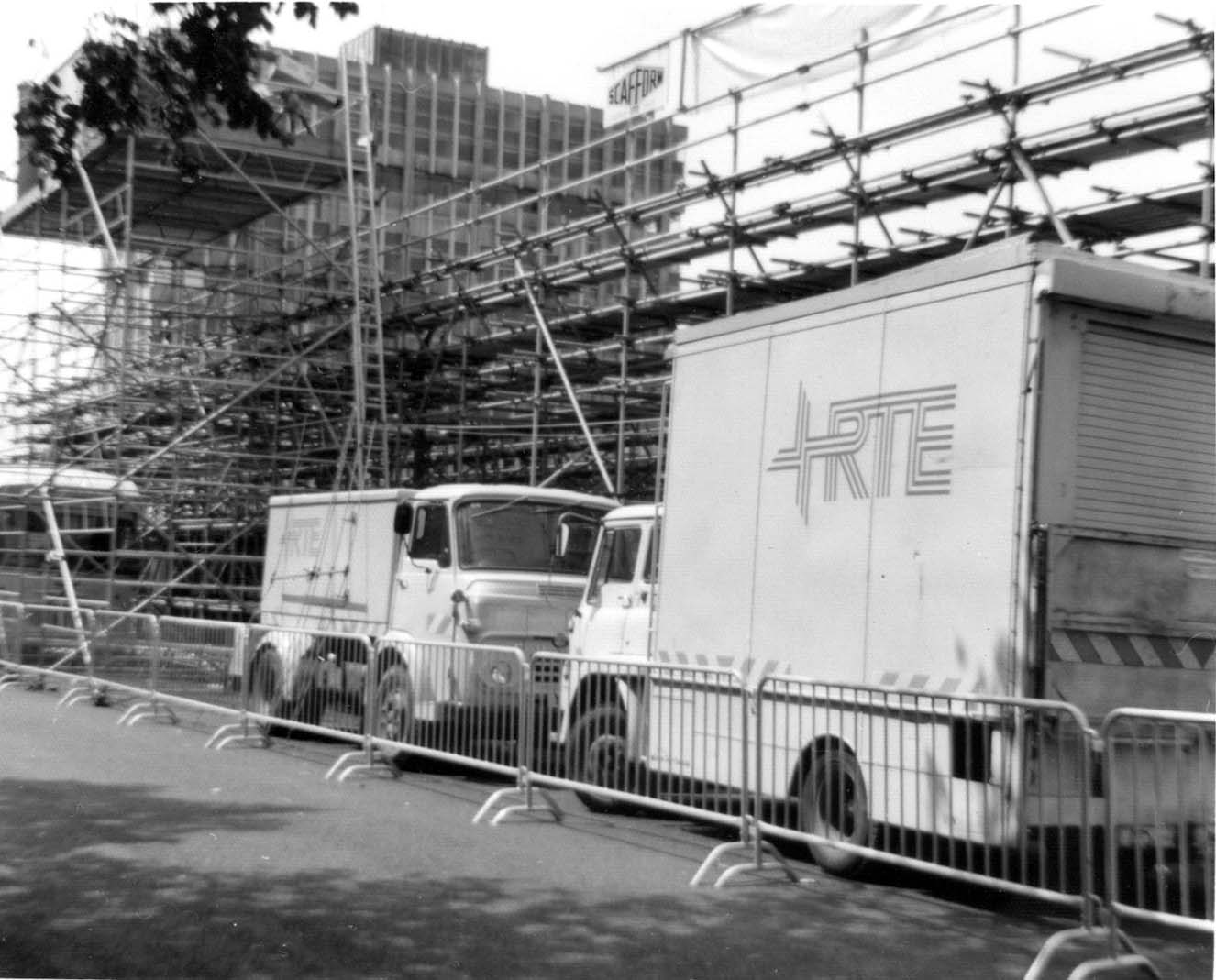
O'Faolain spent several years working for RTÉ in Dublin.

O'Faolain attended convent school in Dublin but was expelled aged fourteen after going home from dances with a married man. She then went to St. Louis', a boarding school in County Monaghan, whose austere environment and strict educational standards benefitted her. From there, she studied English literature at University College Dublin (UCD), where she ran in a social circle including Mary Lavin, John McGahern, Patrick Kavanagh, and Louis MacNeice. Although she dropped out of her studies temporarily and spent time working menial jobs in England, with financial assistance from Lavin and others, she graduated in 1961. On scholarships, she studied medieval English at the University of Hull before completing a postgraduate degree in 19th-century English literature at the University of Oxford. She then returned to Dublin to work at UCD as an academic in the English literature department, which brought her into contact with the bohemian Dublin literary scene of the late 1960s and early 1970s.

In 1970, O'Faolain moved to London to work for the BBC. She was a producer at the Community Programme Unit, which sought to allow members of the public to create programmes for national broadcast on human interest topics like transgender people, anti-pornography protests, and community organising in the Bogside. She also made programmes with the arts faculty of the Open University, and taught evening classes at Morley College. During this period, O'Faolain showed little interest in Ireland, regarding the country as backward and unsophisticated, but a visit to the Merriman Summer School in County Clare in 1974 sparked new enthusiasm. In 1977, she moved back to Dublin to work for the public broadcaster, RTÉ, where she became a colleague of female journalists like Doireann Ní Bhriain, Marian Finucane, and Nell McCafferty – later her partner – who were making programmes about Irish society with a feminist bent. O'Faolain was the producer of Women Today, a pioneering radio programme, from 1983 to 1986. One series she worked on, Plain Tales, a televised interview programme in which women spoke directly to camera about their life experiences, won a Jacob's Award in 1985.

== Writing career ==
O'Faolain had been interested in books from an early age, and credited voracious reading for helping her through a difficult childhood. At Oxford, she encountered the British Marxist historian Raphael Samuel, whose work on material historical development in rural England contributed to her analysis of Irish society. Her introspective and retrospective work was also influenced by the French author Marcel Proust, who was a particular favourite of hers as she got older. O'Faolain worked as a book reviewer for The Times. Between 1990 and 1993, she co-presented Booklines, a television programme about books for RTÉ, a programme she said "nobody ever watched because it was on terribly late at night".

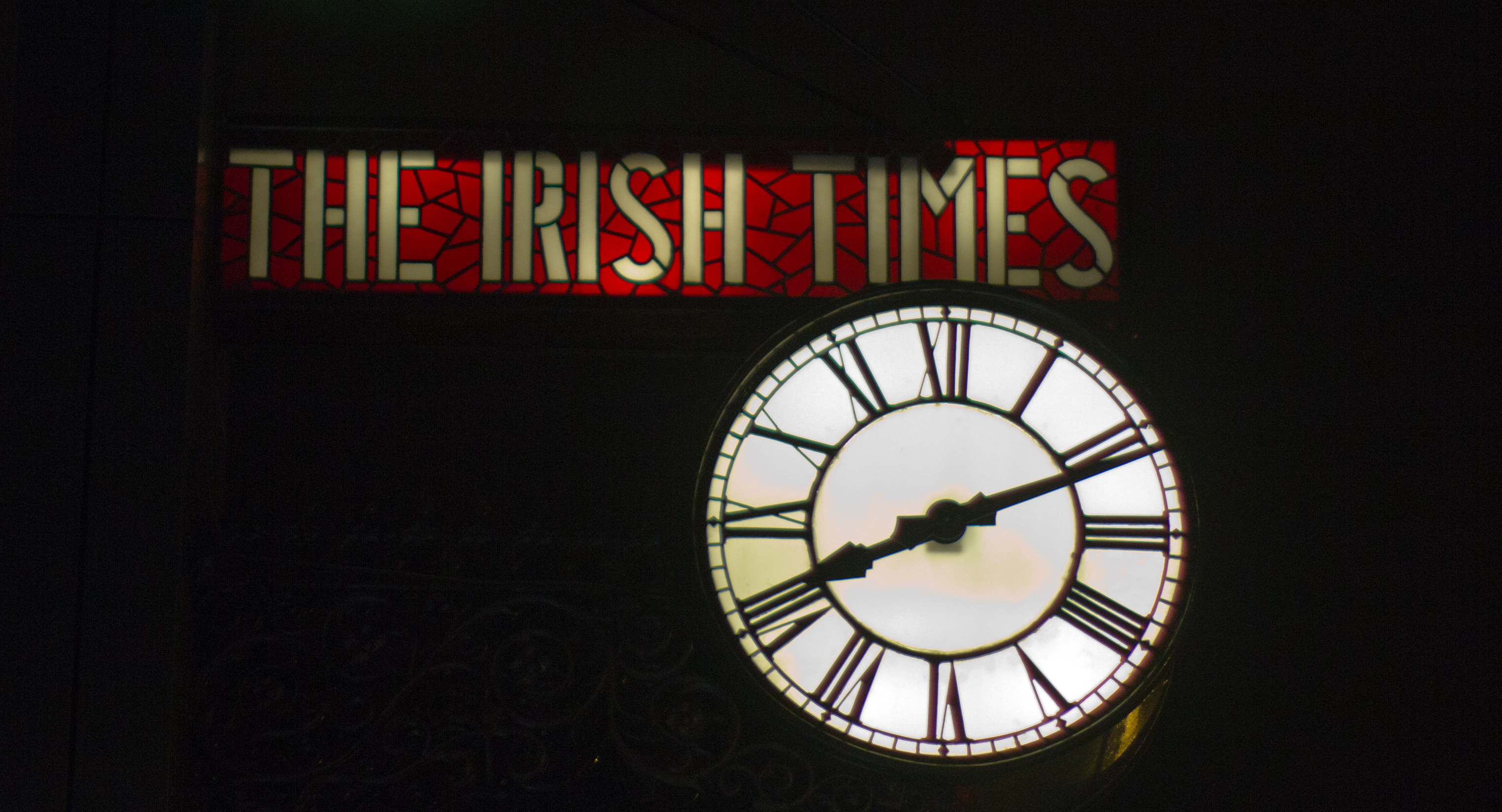
O'Faolain's columns for The Irish Times became the basis for her 1996 memoir, Are You Somebody?.

In 1986, Conor Brady, the editor of The Irish Times, offered O'Faolain a newspaper column after hearing her being interviewed by Gay Byrne on the radio. Brady was struck by her ability to "infuse ordinary people's everyday activities with value and interest". The column became a major success; O'Faolain was awarded journalist of the year in 1986. O'Faolain wrote about domestic violence, homophobia, the role of the Catholic Church, class, sexual mores, the Travelling community and Ireland's high birth rate. Her writing was outspoken and carried notes of humour. The emotive and uncompromising tone of her columns was praised as fearless and authentic, but others, like her colleague Mary Holland, found her writing self-indulgent. The columns made O'Faolain a figure of some note in Ireland, though she was not a celebrity; in her memoir, she wrote:

I'm fairly well known in Ireland. I've been on television a lot, and there's a photo of me in the paper, at the top of my column. But I'm no star. People have to look at me twice or three times to put a name on me. Sometimes when I'm drinking in a lounge bar, a group of women, say, across the room, may look at me and send one of their number over to me, or when I'm in the grocery store someone who has just passed me by turns back and comes right up to me and scrutinises my face. 'Are you somebody?' they ask. Well – am I somebody? I'm not anybody in terms of the world, but then who decides what a somebody is? How is a somebody made?

O'Faolain acted as a roving commentator for The Irish Times, covering the 1994 Cregg Wood murders in County Clare, and visiting Northern Ireland at the time of the Good Friday Agreement in 1998. Following periods of leave while she worked on her books, she left the paper in 2002, and wrote a column in the Sunday Tribune from 2005 until her death.

=== Non-fiction ===
==== Are You Somebody? ====
In December 1995, the Irish publisher New Island Books asked O'Faolain to write an autobiographical introduction to a book of her newspaper columns. O'Faolain said "I was ashamed of reprinting columns with ancient arguments in them. It's the most pitiful form of bookmaking ... I had to answer the question nobody had asked: where do my opinions come from? The answer was simple: ideology had nothing to do with it. My opinions come from my life." The commissioning editor at New Island, Anthony Glavin, later said: "She had always wanted to write her story, but had never got round to it. And yes, we did talk about her vulnerability a lot. I asked was she sure and she said she was." O'Faolain initially struggled to write in the first-person singular, remarking later "you don't crawl to the edge of 55 in Ireland by thinking you're somebody. You get there sideways." After psychological counselling and a creative writing course, she wrote a 200-page memoir, called Are You Somebody?.

O'Faolain wrote Are You Somebody? in her mid-fifties, at a time when her long-term relationship with Nell McCafferty had just ended. She felt a sense of disappointment at having reached middle age with no partner, no children, and no major accomplishments. She later recalled that she had "wasted my thirties and forties drinking and miserable, unable to break my way out of my little demon-haunted self". The memoir focused heavily on her childhood and her relationship to her parents; she told her friend, the author June Caldwell, that the book began and ended with accounts of their turbulent marriage because "I think out of some mixture of loyalty and being imprinted by pattern, I was trying to oblige them by ruining myself. I was tempted to join my mother in her despair all my life." A major focus of the book was O'Faolain's relationships with men, and her emotional inheritance of her mother's loneliness; even after achieving literary success, O'Faolain remarked of her mother that "her unhappiness seems much more real, still, than my happiness".

Are You Somebody?: The Life and Times of Nuala O'Faolain was published in Ireland in late 1996. O'Faolain appeared on The Late Late Show to promote the book; she was asked by the host, Gay Byrne, "You've slept with a lot of men, haven't you?", to which she replied: "Only three that ever mattered, which is modest for a woman of my age." The interview became warmer as it went on; O'Faolain later described it as one of the highlights of her life because "I did reach down to a rare honesty for it". Emilie Pine wrote that the narrative O'Faolain presented of her life in this interview was not an endearing or popular one, but it resonated with Irish women, and caused the book to quickly sell out. Despite O'Faolain's wish that as few copies be printed as possible, many bookshops in Ireland sold the memoir straight from the wholesalers' boxes because they did not have time to shelve it. It spent twenty weeks at the top of the Irish bestseller list, and O'Faolain was inundated with letters responding to it from Ireland and abroad.

In a review for The Irish Times, Angela Bourke wrote: "Writing about her family, her childhood and womanhood, Nuala O'Faolain unsparingly renders the many bewilderments she has survived as well as the things that have delighted, amused or outraged her. The result is a profoundly textured, truthful memoir, loving and acerbic, vividly told, and so free of blame or bitterness that the reader shudders to think what it must have cost her." The book was published in the United Kingdom in 1997; it also sold well there, and was widely praised by critics. In a review for The Independent, Melissa Benn wrote: "Rare is the book that you really cannot put down, the one that seems as necessary, poignant, impossible and joyful as life. This short work of memory and desire by one of Ireland's most prominent columnists is one of them."

As Are You Somebody? The Accidental Memoir of a Dublin Woman, with a new foreword and without the newspaper columns, the memoir was published by Henry Holt and Company in the United States in 1998. In a review for the New York Times, Zoë Heller wrote: "Contemporary American mores have taught us to regard O'Faolain's dignified brevity with suspicion – as a symptom of 'denial' or, worse still, 'low self-esteem'. In fact, what O'Faolain exemplifies is that rare and much underrated quality – a sense of proportion." It reached number one on the New York Times bestseller list, and sold over 300,000 copies. In total, the memoir sold over a million copies worldwide. Internationally, the book was seen as a female counterpart to Frank McCourt's Angela's Ashes, which was also a worldwide bestseller in the late 1990s and also dealt with Irish childhood and family.

==== Later work ====
A second memoir, Almost There: The Onward Journey of a Dublin Woman, was published in 2003. It focused on O'Faolain's middle age, and her life after the success of Are You Somebody?, when she became wealthy, moved to New York City, began teaching at New York University, and fell in love again. The book included dozens of the letters she had received from readers of her first memoir. In a review for The Observer, Geraldine Bedell wrote: "She deals in the ordinary, daily stuff – moths that stumble through the window on warm air, the silky feel of sand under a hedge on a Donegal beach, where it has never been warmed by the sun. But she handles her material with such particularity of perception and with a way of letting the reader in on the emotion, that it's pretty irresistible." In a starred review, Kirkus Reviews said: "O'Faolain may be 'almost there' – free of turbulence and waste, out of the wild hills and onto calm water – but she may also be constitutionally incapable of such a condition: there's too much grit in her keen eye to let it rest easy upon the world." Almost There was also an international bestseller.

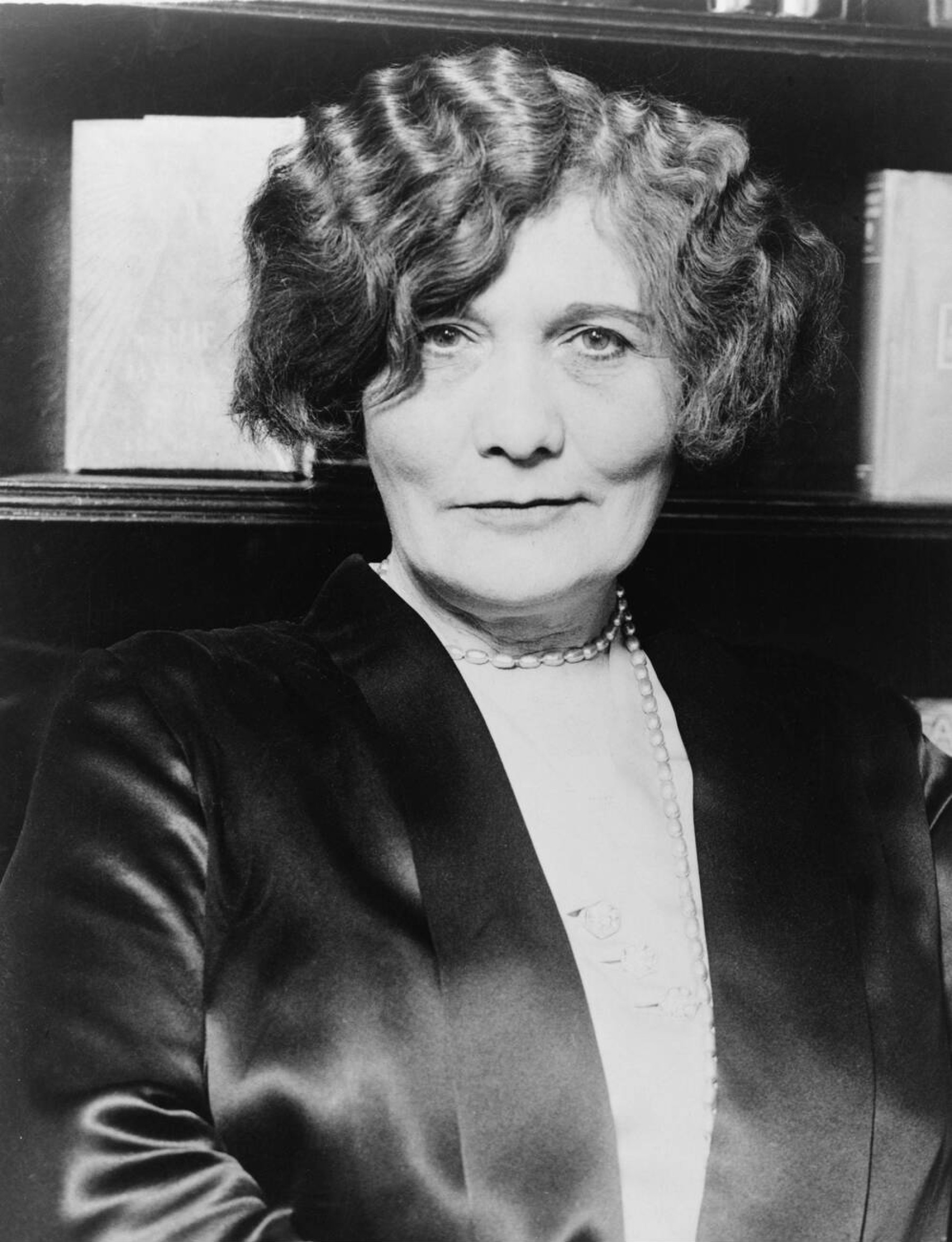
O'Faolain published a biography of Chicago May in 2005.

In 2005, O'Faolain published The Story of Chicago May, a biography of Chicago May, the Irish petty criminal who became notorious in the U.S. in the early 20th century. In a review for The Times, Anne Enright praised the book for not fictionalising May's narrative and respecting her previous autobiographical writing. In 2006, the book won the Prix Femina étranger, a French literary award for foreign writers decided by an all-female jury. On winning the prize, O'Faolain said: "The book is in every bookshop window in France and I wish May knew – she spent a lot of time in French jails for her part in her lover's burglary of the American Express office, still in the Rue Scribe, in 1903."

=== Fiction ===
After the American success of Are You Somebody? in 1998, O'Faolain was offered a million-dollar advance to write a novel. She published the novel, My Dream of You, in 2001. The novel deals with a middle-aged Irish writer's reconnection with her past after the death of a close friend. The novel also has a historical angle, involving the protagonist's research into a 19th-century divorce case in the aftermath of the Great Famine. The novel was a New York Times notable book of 2001 and a bestseller. O'Faolain experienced writer's block while attempting a second novel; Best Love, Rosie was published posthumously in 2009.

=== Writing style ===
In a New York Times review of Almost There, Deborah Mason wrote that O'Faolain had "a tangy storytelling style, nurtured in a mordant Irish sense of irony and an Oxford-trained sleekness of thought." The journalist Dónal Lynch wrote that O'Faolain's writing existed between the "nostalgia of Maeve Binchy and the horror of Frank McCourt". The academic Emer Nolan wrote that O'Faolain had a voice "that rapidly became associated with a unique blend of confessional self-revelation and cultural authority". In the foreword to posthumous collection of columns, A More Complex Truth, Fintan O'Toole praised as unique "her ability to write about, say, mobile phones and abortion, St Patrick's Day parades and sectarian violence, in exactly the same voice. She had perfect pitch for a note that was precisely halfway between the intimacy of a confession and the objectivity of reportage."

The academic Emer Nolan wrote that in Are You Somebody?, O'Faolain showed a lack of interest in conventional femininity, saying: "She takes it for granted that significant romantic relationships involve friendship of a particular kind: she recalls conversations, books, shared work and travel." She also writes frankly about the role of sex in Irish society in the 1970s, and the risks associated with unplanned pregnancy. She writes that her relationships with men are inclined towards what she calls "hero worship". In her entry in the Dictionary of Irish Biography, Patrick Maume wrote that her "identification with the figure of the neglected child resonated with the reassessment of the immediate Irish past that marked the 1990s and 2000s; her constant self-reinvention and self-questioning gave her writing a quality of open-endedness which enhanced its appeal for many readers."

Many reviewers praised Are You Somebody? for its authenticity. The academic Shannon Forbes wrote that the authenticity in O'Faolain's writing derived from her acknowledgement of the fallibility of memory. O'Faolain wrote the memoir as a way of "assembling memories in hopes of transforming disorder into order". She was careful in the memoir to distinguish between historical events in her life and her own interpretation of them. She was also careful to explain to the reader where her archival material has come from, such as when she mentioned that a letter from her father to her mother was found in a biscuit tin after they had died. The academic Jane Elizabeth Dougherty wrote that O'Faolain's memoirs spoke to a discontinuity between girlhood and womanhood which also appeared in the writing of prominent Irish writers Lady Gregory and Éilís Ní Dhuibhne. Like Elizabeth Bowen, O'Faolain's childhood seemed inaccessible relative to male Irish memoirists of childhood like Muiris Ó Súilleabháin and Frank O'Connor. As in Edna O'Brien's writing, female subjectivity seemed to derive from sexual trauma and arrival into the post-pubertal world of patriarchal sexuality.

== Social and political views ==
As a student at UCD, O'Faolain was a member of the National Progressive Democrats, a left-wing political party founded by Noël Browne. During the 1968 student protests at UCD, when O'Faolain was teaching at the university, she was criticised by students as sarcastic and authoritarian. O'Faolain was active in the women's movement from early adulthood; she said she had "always been for feminism since she understood what it was". She was active in the Women's Political Association in Ireland in the 1970s. Her views on abortion shifted over time, from a position in support of abortion rights to one preferring to focus on preventing crisis pregnancies.

O'Faolain described her early life as growing up in a Catholic country which in her view feared sexuality and forbade her even information about her body. In her writings she often discusses her frustration at the sexism and rigidity of roles in Catholic Ireland that expected her to marry and have children, neither of which she did. O'Faolain wrote during the beginnings of the women's movement; her writings often dealt with misogyny. She wrote about domestic violence and female genital mutilation. After her death, her friend Luke Dodd remarked that she had skilfully analysed her own life in relation to the ideal of women's freedom promoted by feminism. She often wrote about the lack of feminist consciousness betrayed by her relationships with men. In spite of her feminism, O'Faolain said "I don't have any problem with the art made by dead white males". O'Faolain often wrote about the hypocrisy of Irish society; after the death of Brendan Smyth in 1997, she wrote: "they went on calling him 'Father' in this culture; even though he embodied the worst wickedness anyone could think of, the notion of taking his title from him, or tacitly agreeing not to use it, was not entertained." O'Faolain's criticisms of the Catholic church and lack of religious belief did not preclude her from having a worldview influenced by Christianity and an attachment to Catholic rituals, reflected in her decision to have a Catholic funeral.

O'Faolain described Ireland as "this damp little shambles of a democracy on the edge of the Western world". Her political views were influenced by her friendships with Liam de Paor, Seán Mac Réamoinn, Raphael Samuel and Arnold Kettle. Her experience of class was influenced by her own experiences of deprivation in childhood. Though her views on Northern Ireland were less republican than those of her partner, Nell McCafferty, she was critical of what she regarded as the anti-nationalist bent of RTÉ in the 1980s.

== Personal life ==
O'Faolain never married and had no children. Although she wrote about her relationships with men and women, she did not identify as bisexual, though others have described her as such.

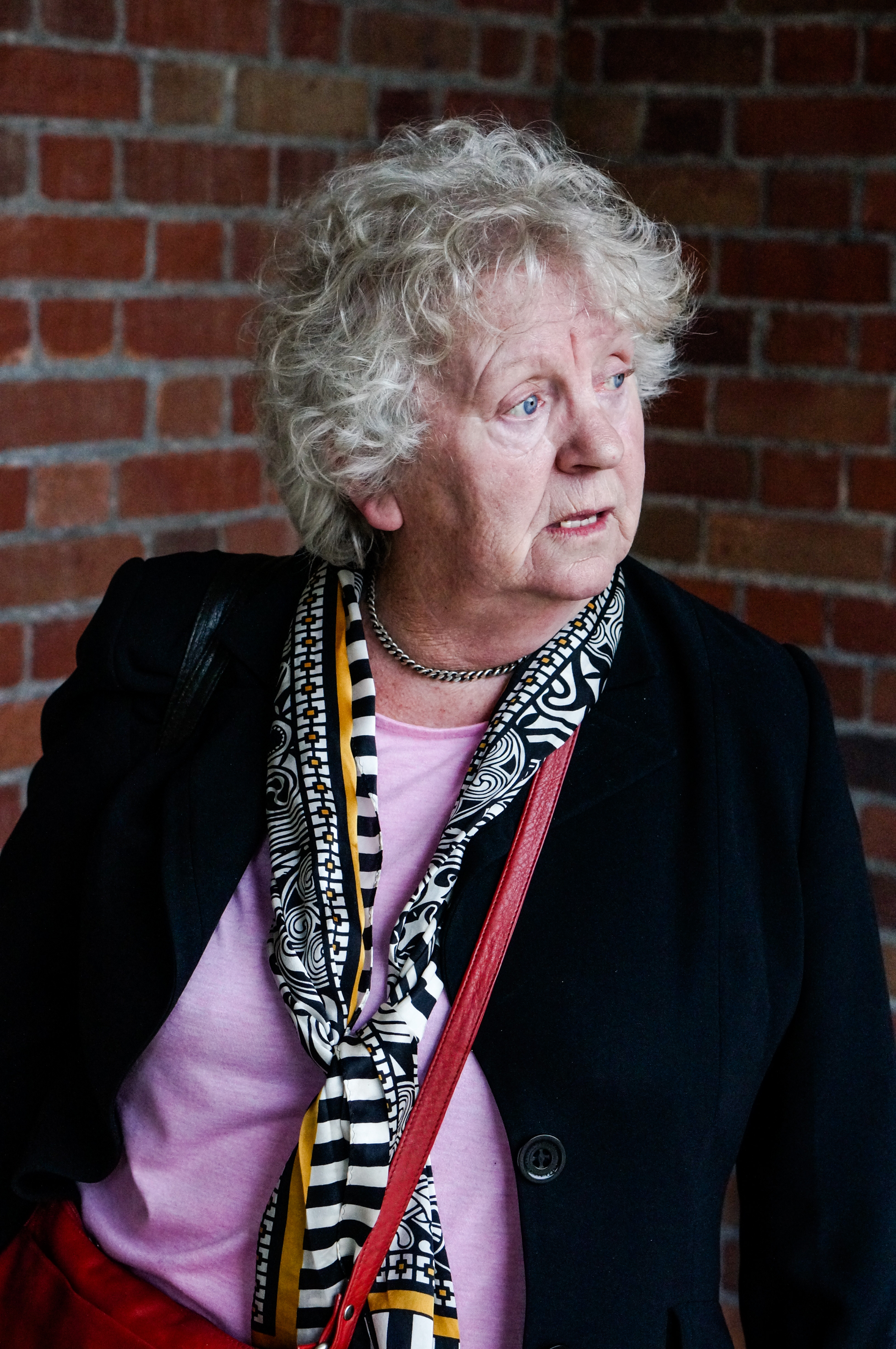
Nell McCafferty in 2014

In the late 1960s and early 1970s, she was in an intermittent relationship with an art critic, Tim Hilton, whom she met at Oxford and had planned to marry. Between 1980 and 1995, O'Faolain was in a relationship with Nell McCafferty, a journalist and feminist. The couple lived in County Clare. Susan McKay wrote in 2008 that they were the "best known closeted lesbian couple in Ireland", only speaking publicly about the relationship after it had ended. After parting ways, O'Faolain and McCafferty were not on speaking terms for some years; McCafferty criticised Are You Somebody? for playing down the seriousness of their relationship. At the time of O'Faolain's death, they had partly reconciled.

After Are You Somebody?, O'Faolain divided her time between Ireland and New York City. During the last six years of her life, O'Faolain was in a relationship with a Brooklyn-based lawyer, John Low-Beer, whom she met on Match.com. In Almost There, O'Faolain wrote of feeling resentment towards Low-Beer's daughter from a previous marriage.

== Illness and death ==
O'Faolain was diagnosed with metastatic cancer while living in New York City in early 2008. She had experienced a strange feeling in the right side of her body and presented at the emergency department of a hospital, where she was told that she had primary tumours in her lungs which had spread to her brain and liver, and that her cancer was incurable. She refused chemotherapy.

O'Faolain returned to Ireland and was interviewed by her friend, Marian Finucane, on her radio show about her terminal illness on 12 April 2008. Both O'Faolain and Finucane were in tears during the interview, which was recorded in Galway, where O'Faolain was undergoing radiotherapy. O'Faolain told Finucane: "I don't want more time. As soon as I heard I was going to die, the goodness went from life". O'Faolain's frank discussion of her illness led to the interview being preceded by a warning that her comments may be upsetting to others with life-threatening conditions. O'Faolain said that she did not believe in God or an afterlife, but as in the song "Thíos i Lár an Ghleanna", she was asking for help she knew would not come from a god she did not believe in. The interview had a major public impact in Ireland; after Finucane's death in 2020, the Irish Independent described it as "one of the most extraordinary [interviews] in the history of Irish broadcasting".

In the final weeks of her life, O'Faolain travelled Europe with close friends and family, staying in the Ritz Hotel in Paris, visiting the Berlin State Opera and the Prado Museum in Madrid for the first time, and, in the week before she died, travelling to Sicily with her family and John Low-Beer. She died in a hospice in Blackrock, Dublin late on 9 May 2008. Her funeral took place in the Church of Our Lady of the Visitation in Fairview in north Dublin on 13 May. O'Faolain's ashes were buried in Kilbarrack Cemetery in north Dublin with her maternal grandparents, Terence and Marion O'Sullivan, and her brother, Dermot Phelan. After Low-Beer complained that she had not mentioned him in her radio interview, she asked that her tombstone be inscribed "Beloved of John Low-Beer of Brooklyn."

== Legacy ==
In 2012, RTÉ announced a major new documentary on her life. Every Single Minute, a 2014 novel by Hugo Hamilton, is based in his experiences travelling in Berlin with O'Faolain during her final illness. A book published in 2019 by the academic Emer Nolan, Five Irish Women: The Second Republic, 1960–2016, analysed O'Faolain's career and contribution to public life alongside those of Edna O'Brien, Sinéad O'Connor, Bernadette Devlin McAliskey, and Anne Enright. The book contrasted the relatively kind reception for O'Faolain's work, and the sympathetic response to her final illness, to the more hostile treatment of O'Brien and O'Connor.

O'Faolain's memoirs were considered a precursor to the first-person narratives which were significant in the 2015 Irish same-sex marriage referendum and the 2018 abortion referendum in creating a dialogue between writer and reader. Boxes of correspondence received by O'Faolain from readers of Are You Somebody? are now archived at the National Library of Ireland. The memoir and its rejection of shame influenced other women to write; Emilie Pine said that her work was "so brave and so loud that it becomes unavoidable, that's what actually broke the silence in the end". For an exhibition on O'Faolain at the Museum of Literature Ireland in 2020, the novelist Anne Enright said: "It was such a small society to bring out a little bomb of a book like that. It was an intense moment of gossip-making, you could not believe she was saying these things."

== Awards ==
- 1985: Jacob's Award as producer of RTÉ television programme Plain Tales
- 2006: Prix Femina étranger, The Story of Chicago May

== Books ==
- O'Faolain, Nuala (1996). Are You Somebody? The Accidental Memoir of a Dublin Woman. New York: Henry Holt and Company. ISBN 0-8050-5663-7.
- My Dream of You, Riverhead Books, 2001. ISBN 1-57322-177-5.
- Almost There: The Onward Journey of a Dublin Woman, Riverhead Books, 2003. ISBN 1-57322-374-3.
- The Story of Chicago May, Riverhead Books, 2005. ISBN 1-57322-320-4.
- Best Love, Rosie, New Island Books, 2009. ISBN 978-1-84840-045-0.
- A More Complex Truth, New Island Books, 2010. ISBN 1848400667, reprinted as A Radiant Life: The Selected Journalism of Nuala O'Faolain, Harry N. Abrams 2011. ISBN 0810998068.

== Sources ==
- Dougherty, Jane Elizabeth (2007). "Nuala O'Faolain and the Unwritten Irish Girlhood". New Hibernia Review / Iris Éireannach Nua. 11 (2): 50–65. doi:10.1353/nhr.2007.0021. JSTOR 20558161.
- Farrelly, Patrick; O'Callaghan, Kate (2012). Nuala (documentary film). Accidental Pictures.
- Forbes, Shannon (2011). "Authentic Life-Writing and Nuala O'Faolain's Are You Somebody? 'The Accidental Memoir of a Dublin Woman'". Irish University Review. 41 (2): 155–67. JSTOR 24576105.
- Nolan, Emer (2019). "Nuala O'Faolain: An Emotional Episode in Public Life". Five Irish Women: The Second Republic, 1960–2016. Manchester University Press. pp. 152–206. ISBN 978-1526136763.
- O'Toole, Fintan (2010). Foreword. A More Complex Truth: Selected Writings. By O'Faolain, Nuala. Dublin: New Island Books. ISBN 9781848400665.
- Pine, Emilie (2011). "The Remembered Self: Irish Memoir, Past and Present Selves". The Politics of Irish Memory. London: Palgrave Macmillan. pp. 52–77. ISBN 978-1-349-31991-6.
- Vodanovic, Lucia (2022). "Confessional Journalism, Authenticity and Lived Experiences: A Case Study of News Stories Published During the Irish Abortion Referendum". Journalism Practice. 18 (3): 571–86. doi:10.1080/17512786.2022.2049012.
