= Nuala Hayes =

Irish actor, storyteller, author and broadcaster

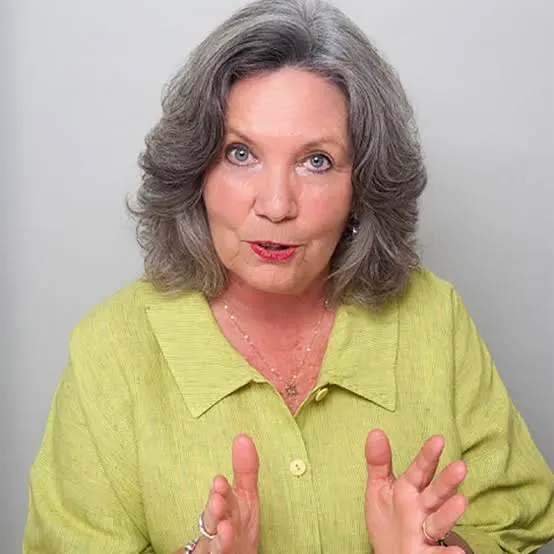
- Born: 19 August 1948 (age 77)
- Occupations: Actor, storyteller, author, broadcaster
- Years active: 1969–present
- Spouse: Art Ó Briain (m. 1972; died 2020)

Nuala Hayes (born 19 August 1948) is an Irish actor, storyteller, author and broadcaster. She trained at the Abbey Theatre and was a member of the Abbey Theatre Company from 1970 to 1975. She is known for originating the role of Máire in the world premiere of Brian Friel's Translations with the Field Day Theatre Company in 1980, and for founding Scéalta Shamhna, Dublin's first storytelling festival, in 1991. She is the author of Laois Folk Tales (2015), published by The History Press.

== Early life and education ==
Nuala Hayes was born on 19 August 1948 in Ireland. She holds a Bachelor of Arts (Honours) degree from University College Dublin. She subsequently trained as an actor at the Abbey Theatre, Ireland's national theatre.

== Acting career ==
=== Abbey Theatre (1970–1975) ===
Hayes trained at the Abbey Theatre and was a member of the Abbey Theatre Company for five years, from 1970 to 1975.^{[1]} During this period, she performed in productions of plays by major Irish playwrights and toured extensively. She also worked with the Young Abbey Theatre in Education Group alongside director Joe Dowling and actor Kathleen Barrington. Abbey Theatre production and casting records for this period are held in the archive at NUI Galway.

=== TEAM Educational Theatre (1975) ===
In 1975, Hayes co-founded TEAM Educational Theatre, a full-time theatre-in-education company that performed in schools throughout Ireland. The company remained active for approximately thirty years.

=== Freelance theatre work ===
After leaving the Abbey Theatre Company, Hayes continued to work as a freelance actor in Irish theatre. In 1989 and 1990 she appeared in an Abbey Theatre touring production of J. M. Synge's The Playboy of the Western World, which toured to the United States. She also appeared in an Gaeity Theatre Production of Seán O'Casey's Juno and the Paycock, which ran at the Aldwych Theatre in London's West End.

In 1999, Two Chairs Company produced Samuel Beckett's Happy Days at the Civic Theatre in Tallaght, Dublin. Hayes played Winnie and Mick Lally played Willie, in a production directed by Colm Ó Briain.

Field Day Theatre Company (1980–1984)

Hayes performed with the Field Day Theatre Company from 1980 to 1984. She appeared in the company's inaugural production, Brian Friel's Translations, which premiered at the Guildhall in Derry on 23 September 1980. The production was directed by Art Ó Briain, and the cast included Stephen Rea, Ray McAnally, Liam Neeson, Hayes, and Mick Lally. Hayes played the role of Máire, an Irish-speaking village girl whose romance with a British army officer forms a central thread of the play.

She also appeared in subsequent Field Day productions, including a version of Anton Chekhov's Three Sisters, Tom Paulin's The Riot Act and Derek Mahon's High Time.

=== Television and radio ===
Hayes appeared in the RTÉ soap drama Glenroe and the Irish language series Ros na Rún on TG4. She also appeared in RTÉ programmes including The Women's Programme and the Irish-language magazine show Cúrsaí.

Hayes has made regular contributions to RTÉ Radio, including appearances on Sunday Miscellany, one of RTÉ's longest-running radio programmes.

As an independent broadcaster, Hayes produced a number of radio documentaries for RTÉ Radio 1 and RTÉ lyric fm, several made under the name Two Chairs Company. These include:

- The Yarnspinners (RTÉ Radio 1)
- Moving Statues (RTÉ Radio 1), made with broadcaster Doireann Ní Bhriain; winner of a Jacob's Award
- Who Was Vere Foster? (RTÉ lyric fm), made with Doireann Ní Bhriain
- The Lay of the Land (RTÉ lyric fm), Two Chairs Company
- You Can't Shove Your Granny off a Bus (RTÉ Radio 1 series)
- Tales at the Crossroads / Tales from the Midlands of Ireland (RTÉ Radio 1), Two Chairs Company; arising from her 2005 Artist in Residence work in County Laois

=== Storytelling work ===
In 1991 Hayes co-founded Two Chairs Company with musician and composer Ellen Cranitch to present words and music in live performance. The company also undertook community education work, running interactive storytelling and music workshops for children in libraries and schools around Ireland.

In 2000, Hayes collaborated with the Verbal Arts Centre in Derry on Everlasting Voices.

Hayes devised The Queen of Irish Storytellers: Stories of Peig Sayers in collaboration with author Éilís Ní Dhuibhne and musician and folklorist Aoife Granville, with live animation by visual artist Rita Duffy. The production toured Ireland and was performed at the Scottish International Storytelling Festival in Edinburgh in 2024.

In 2025, she was one of three storytellers to undertake a ten-month residency on seven West Cork islands as part of Creative Places West Cork Islands. In the same year she appeared in Beckett Sa Chreig / Guth na mBan, a production of three plays for women by Samuel Beckett translated into Irish by Micheál Ó Conghaile.

== Publications ==
=== Books ===
- Laois Folk Tales. The History Press, 2015.
- Bóithrin na Smaointe: Memories and Stories of the Older Generation on Cape Clear Island / Oileán Chléire, West Cork. Photography by John Minihan, 2006.
- St Anthony's Tongue: Stories from Birr Community Nursing Unit, Co. Offaly. Photography by John Minihan, 2011.

=== Anthologies ===
- Folktales of Ireland, Parts I and II.
- Sunday Miscellany Anthology 2018–2023. New Island Books.
- Sunday Miscellany Anthology 2023–2025. New Island Books.
- Shadows + Reflections: The Irish National War Memorial Gardens. Gandon Editions, 2021. ISBN 978-1-910140-32-1 Foreword by President Michael D. Higgins.

=== Audio ===
- The Brewery of Eggshells and Other Stories (CD), with Kate Corkery.

== Organisational roles ==
Hayes served as Chairperson of Storytellers of Ireland / Aos Scéal Éireann from 2020 to 2024.^{[4]} She is listed in the Poetry Ireland Writers in Schools Directory.

== Personal life ==
Hayes married theatre director and filmmaker Art Ó Briain (1947–2020) in 1972.
