= Father & Son (TV serial) =

Irish television crime thriller

- Genre: Crime thriller
- Written by: Frank Deasy
- Directed by: Brian Kirk
- Starring: Dougray Scott; Sophie Okonedo; Stephen Rea; Ian Hart; Reece Noi; Wunmi Mosaku; John Kavanagh; Flora Montgomery
- Composers: Harry Escott & Molly Nyman
- Country of origin: Ireland
- No. of series: 1
- No. of episodes: 4

Production
- Executive producers: Andy Harries; Frank Deasy; James Flynn; Morgan O'Sullivan
- Producer: Michael Casey
- Running time: 46 mins
- Production companies: Left Bank Pictures; Octagon Films

Original release
- Network: RTÉ One
- Release: 29 June – 20 July 2009

Father & Son is a four-part Irish television crime thriller produced by Left Bank Pictures and Octagon Films. The series was broadcast in Ireland on RTÉ One and in the United Kingdom on ITV.

Written by Frank Deasy, the serial depicts the return of Michael O'Connor (played by Dougray Scott) to his native Ireland, after spending several years imprisoned in the United Kingdom. A parallel storyline follows O'Connor's son and sister-in-law in Manchester. The serial was filmed entirely on location in Dublin and Wicklow from October to December 2008, with only minimal second-unit filming in Manchester. Father & Son was first broadcast on RTÉ One in June 2009 and has since received positive reaction from the Irish press. It was broadcast in the UK on the ITV network during June 2010.

== Plot ==
The series focuses on inner city crime life in both the United Kingdom and Ireland. Ex-criminal Michael O'Connor (Dougray Scott) comes back to Ireland to live with his new pregnant partner Anna, free from his past life of crime. Michael was arrested and spent years in prison, leaving his wife Lynne and son Séan (Reece Noi) on their own. Three days later his wife Lynne was murdered, leaving Michael devastated, and he quickly turns his back on crime. He returns to Ireland, leaving his son Séan behind in the care of Lynne's sister Connie. Connie and Séan live in a gang-ridden Manchester suburb. Séan distances himself from the gangs, and their culture of violence. But it's not long until gang leader Jacob King (Dwayne Scantlebury) disturbs the peace. However, with the unfolding of unexpected events, Séan is arrested for a murder which he did not commit, and is imprisoned. These events lead his father Michael back to Manchester to help free his son from prison. Manchester, however brings back painful memories for Michael, as it was here his wife was murdered, and comes to terms that his past involvement in crime resulted in Lynne's death.

== Cast ==
- Dougray Scott as Michael O'Connor
- Sophie Okenedo as Connie Turner
- Ian Hart as D.I. Tony Conroy
- Stephen Rea as Augustine Flynn
- Reece Noi as Sean O'Connor
- Wunmi Mosaku as Stacey Cox
- Simon Delaney as George Harper
- John Kavanagh as John O'Connor
- Terence Maynard as Barrington
- Imani McLaren as Imani Turner
- Flora Montgomery as Anna Caplan
- Darren Morfitt as Blanchflower
- Philip Arditti as Suliman
- Michael McElhatton as D.S. Norman McGinty
- David Wilmot as D.S. Declan Henderson
- Dwayne Scantlebury as Jacob King

== Episodes ==
No.	Title	Directed by	Written by	Original release date	UK viewers (millions)
1	"Episode 1"	Brian Kirk	Frank Deasy	29 June 2009	5.91
Ex-Manchester gangland boss, Michael O'Connor (Dougray Scott), who is now happily settled in rural Ireland, is forced to go back to Manchester, where his past comes back to haunt him where his wife, Lynne, was murdered three days after he went to prison, when his son, Sean O'Connor (Reece Noi), is found guilty of the murder of a gang member and was the witness of the murder of a friend committed by a gang member, Elijah King (Lucien Laviscount). The shooting was committed by Sean's girlfriend, Stacey Cox (Wunmi Mosaku), but to protect her, Sean takes the blame, even though he has no criminal affiliation. Michael must find a way of protecting Sean before he becomes jail bound. Michael's former cellmate, Barrington Smith(Terence Maynard), offers to look after Sean and shares a cell with him. Michael and Barrington catch up at his dialysis appointment and he gives Michael a car with money and a gun in the glove compartment. Later, while Sean is asleep he wakes up to see Barrington having a seizure and he alerts the guards who take him to hospital. Meanwhile, Michael's Irish girlfriend, Anna (Flora Montgomery) finds out she is pregnant with Michael's child. The younger brother of the boy Elijah, Jacob King (Dwayne Scantlebury) who also killed Sean's friend uniting forces with his younger brother, Benjamin King (Omaar March) and they plan to kill Michael.
2	"Episode 2"	Brian Kirk	Frank Deasy	6 July 2009	4.86
D.I. Tony Conroy (Ian Hart) and his team search for Jacob and the Motorway Crew, the gang that killed Sean's friend. Michael and Sean meet at the prison, but relations are hostile. Michael and Barrington hatch a plan to help him escape from prison with Sean, with help of gangster, Augustine Flynn (Stephen Rea), and some creative money laundering. Anna comes to see Michael in Manchester and gets involved involuntarily. Benjamin is found at school with the .38 pistol that killed Elijah and it is found to be an organised crime gun. Meanwhile, Jacob tries to unsuccessfully kill Michael and he goes after Jacob, but soon he lets him go. Elsewhere, Stacy's relationship with Barrington becomes evident.
3	"Episode 3"	Brian Kirk	Frank Deasy	13 July 2009	4.63
Michael meets with Conroy to make a deal and gain the release of Sean. Michael's dad, John O'Connor (John Kavanagh) has a heart attack while visiting Sean at the prison. When Michael goes to pick up clothes for John from his house, he discovers that he has been ratting him out to Conroy, several years ago and which may have led to Lynne's death. Sean discovers that Barrington and Stacey are dating and becomes enraged. Meanwhile, Irish detectives begin to hound Anna in Ireland.
4	"Episode 4"	Brian Kirk	Frank Deasy	20 July 2009	5.05
Michael goes to talk to Sean in prison and tells him about the deal he struck with Conroy, but Sean refuses to co-operate and in the course of events reveals that he accidentally killed Lynne with Michael's loaded gun which he had been playing with. Stacey goes to collect Barrington's money and has a confrontation with Michael. On leaving the hotel, she is shot dead by Jacob. Conroy's partners, Norman McGinty (Michael McElhatton) and Declan Henderson (David Wilmot) enter Anna's house and tie her up and leave and leave a Molotov cocktail next to her on the orders of Augustine. Augustine blackmails Michael in killing Barrington with photographic evidence of Anna being held captive. It then transpires that Augustine and Conroy were in league together to bring Michael down. The series ends with Michael being sent to prison, Anna giving birth to a baby boy and Connie, Sean and Imani going into witness protection.

== Production ==
Frank Deasy was inspired to write Father & Son (under the working title The Return) after considering how decisions he made when he was young shaped the lives of his three children. From that, he developed the character of Michael O'Connor. He also acknowledged how money laundering and investment is relevant to Ireland and wanted to explore how Irish people have "disappeared" into Britain. Deasy compared the premise of Father & Son to his previous television serial The Passion, calling Father & Son "a reverse telling"; "it's the story of a father prepared to sacrifice himself for his son, to cleanse his son's sins, as it were."

British network ITV commissioned Deasy's script but were unable to fund the entire series, so approached Irish broadcaster RTÉ and the Irish Film Board for additional funding. Tax breaks available to television production in Ireland made it cheaper to film outside of Britain. Production, by Left Bank Pictures, was based in Crumlin. Open casting calls for background actors were held on 2 and 3 October at Liberty Hall. Filming ran over 52 days from 13 October to 13 December 2008. Two days were spent filming in Manchester for establishing shots. Location filming took place along the Dublin quays and in Wicklow. The production was the first time director Brian Kirk and producer Michael Casey had used the Red One digital camera. Production of the series in Dublin and Wicklow generated €5 million for the local economy.

== Broadcast and reception ==
Following Episode 1, Donald Clarke for The Irish Times compared Father & Son to the American drama series The Wire, complimenting the opening titles and "its ability to tie together a multitude of apparently unconnected stories". However, he was concerned that the level of realism created by the writing and directing was spoilt by filming the Manchester-set scenes in Dublin: "Deasy appears to have something important and specific to say about gang culture in Manchester, but, filmed largely in Dublin, the series cannot hope to breathe genuine Mancunian air [...] the average Dublin viewer, having spotted familiar roofs and corners, will find his credulity stretched to breaking point." In the Evening Herald, Pat Stacey praised the actors, particularly Dougray Scott, and compared the series to "the kind of stuff writers such as Trevor Preston and the Kennedy Martin brothers, Troy and Ian, used to turn out for ITV in the 70s and early-80s, but with an added edge of social realism." Stacey continued his praise, calling Episode 2 "a fantastically well-crafted thriller that shows no sign of letting up".

The Irish Playwrights and Screenwriters Guild posthumously presented Deasy with the ZeBBie Award for Best Television Script for Episode 1. At the 7th Irish Film and Television Awards, Deasy won the award for Best Television Script, Stephen Rea won Best Actor in a Supporting Role, and the serial was nominated in the Best Single Drama/Drama Serial category, but lost to Five Minutes of Heaven.

ITV broadcast the serial in the UK from 7 to 10 June 2010.
