= Neasa Ní Annracháin =

Irish radio actress (1922–2014)

- Born: 17 October 1922; Skibbereen, County Cork, Ireland
- Died: 18 December 2014 (aged 92); Skibbereen, County Cork, Ireland
- Occupation: Actor
- Known for: Radio acting
- Spouse: Seán Ó Briain (m. 1948; died 1991)
- Children: 3, including Doireann Ní Bhriain
- Relatives: Kieron Moore (brother); Fachtna Ó hAnnracháin (brother); Bláithín Ní Annracháin (sister)

Neasa Ní Annracháin (IPA: [ˈn̠ʲasˠə n̠ʲiː ˈaːn̪ˠɾˠəxaːnʲ]; 17 October 1922 – 18 December 2014) was an Irish actress known for her work on Irish radio.

== Early life ==
Ní Annracháin was born on 17 October 1922 to farmer and author Peadar Ó hAnnracháin from Skibbereen, and his wife, Máire Ní Suithe from Kinsale. She was the second of six children. She attended the Mercy Conservancy Primary School in Skibbereen and a Hawthorn Secondary School in the same area. When her family moved to Dublin, she attended Chatham Street Music College where she played to violin. She also took classes at the Abbey Theater Drama School.

Several members of her family pursued careers in the arts, her brother Ciarán (stage name Kieron Moore) was a film and television actor, while her brother, Fachtna, was director of music at RTÉ Radio, and her sister, Bláithín, played the harp with the National Symphony Orchestra.

== Career ==
Ní Annracháin worked as a civil servant in the Pigs and Bacon Commission, but in 1948 she married Cork civil servant Seán Ó Briain, and as a consequence was required to leave her job, as was the law at the time.

In 1950 she joined the Radio Éireann Players (REP), a repertory company for radio in Ireland. She became a well-known voice on Irish radio and gave performances in both Irish and English. She was noted for her ability to perform in a wide range of theatrical styles, from John Millington Synge to John B. Keane, and from Samuel Beckett to James Joyce.

She played Mommo in the radio version of Tom Murphy's Bailegangaire in 1987. For a long period she read poetry on Mo Cheol Thú, an activity she continued for many years after formally retiring from the REP in 1988.

=== Awards ===
- In 1975, she won a Jacob's Award for her "outstanding contribution to a distinguished company of actors".
- In 1982 the Radio Éireann Players attracted international attention when they broadcast an uninterrupted, unabridged, 30-hour dramatised performance of James Joyce's epic novel Ulysses, to commemorate the centenary of the author's birth. The record-breaking marathon broadcast was carried by live relay internationally and won a Jacob's Broadcasting Award in recognition of its achievement. Ní Annracháin played "Old Gummy Granny"

== Personal life ==
In 1948 she married Cork civil servant Seán Ó Briain, and they had three children, Doireann, Nuala and Éanna. Their oldest daughter Doireann followed her mother's footsteps into a radio career, and is an Irish independent radio producer.

== Later life and death ==
After her husband died in 1991, she sold her Howth cottage in Dublin and returned to her native Skibbereen. In 2009 suffered a stroke and had to move into a nursing home, where she died on 18 December 2014.
