= John Minihan =

John Minihan may refer to:

- John Minihan (photographer) (born 1946), Irish photographer
- John Minihan (politician), Irish politician
