= Andy Pollak =

Northern Irish journalist

Andy Pollak is a Northern Irish journalist and writer who has a focus on cross-border cooperation in Ireland. He led the Centre for Cross Border Studies (CCBS) and served on the board of the Glencree Centre for Peace and Reconciliation.

== Early life and education ==
Pollak was born in Ballymena, County Antrim in 1948, and largely brought up in London. His father, a Czech citizen of German-speaking Jewish descent, lost his editor's job and was forced to flee Czechoslovakia after the Communist takeover in February 1948. His 1951 book, Strange Land Behind Me, tells the story of his 11 years between being badly wounded fighting for the International Brigades in the Spanish Civil War in 1937, through adventures and imprisonment in the Balkans and India, to his escape from Prague. Pollak's mother, Eileen Gaston, from Ballymena, had gone to Prague to teach English after the Second World War. He received a history degree from the University of Sussex in 1969.

== Work ==
After graduation, Pollak spent some time travelling and working in England, France, Canada and Latin America. He returned to Ireland in 1972 and worked for a period with Hibernia magazine and then as a sub-editor with The Irish Times. He continued to work as a journalist in Dublin, London and Mexico City. In Belfast he worked for BBC Northern Ireland as a reporter (1978–1980), the Irish Times as a reporter (1981–1985) and as editor of the Belfast cultural and political magazine, Fortnight (1981–1985). In 1986 with Ed Moloney he co-authored a biography of DUP leader Rev. Ian Paisley.

In 1992–1993 Pollak was coordinator of the Opsahl Commission (chaired by the Norwegian human rights lawyer Torkel Opsahl), an independent 'citizens inquiry' into ways forward for Northern Ireland.

He was the founding director of the Centre for Cross Border Studies (1999–2013). Before that he was a Dublin reporter, religious affairs correspondent, education correspondent and assistant news editor with The Irish Times from 1986 to 1999. He also contributes to the Irish Independent, Belfast Newsletter, The Belfast Telegraph and the Dublin Review of Books.

During his time as director of the Centre for Cross Border Studies, he also edited the Journal of Cross Border Studies in Ireland and was secretary of Universities Ireland (the all-island university presidents' network) and the all-island Standing Conference on Teacher Education North and South (SCoTENS). He was a board member of the Glencree Centre for Peace and Reconciliation from 2014 to 2020. From 2016 to 2023 he was a board member of Places of Sanctuary Ireland, which works to welcome and integrate refugees, asylum-seekers and other migrants.

A blogger, he publishes 2 Irelands Together, commenting on Northern Irish and cross border issues.

== Works ==
In 2019 he co-authored, with former Northern Ireland Deputy First Minister and deputy SDLP leader Seamus Mallon, 'Seamus Mallon: A Shared Home Place'.

== Personal life ==
Pollak is married to radio producer/presenter Doireann Ní Bhriain. The couple have two daughters, Sorcha, an Irish Times journalist, and Grainne, who runs the 'Safe to Create' project for the Irish Theatre Institute.

== Publications ==
- Paisley by Ed Moloney and Andy Pollak, Poolbeg Press, 1986
- A Citizens Inquiry: The Opsahl Report on Northern Ireland [editor], Lilliput Press, 1993
- Seamus Mallon: A Shared Home Place by Seamus Mallon with Andy Pollak, Lilliput Press, 2019
