= Frank Deasy =

Irish screenwriter (1959–2009)

- Born: 19 May 1959; Dublin, Ireland
- Died: 17 September 2009 (aged 50); Edinburgh, Scotland
- Occupation: Screenwriter
- Spouse: Marie

Frank Deasy (19 May 1959 – 17 September 2009) was an Irish screenwriter. He won an Emmy Award for the television series Prime Suspect and was also nominated for his works, Looking After Jo Jo and The Grass Arena. His other works included the BBC/HBO mini-series, The Passion.

Preceding his death from liver cancer on 17 September 2009, Deasy spoke in public about his condition. An appearance on RTÉ Radio 1's Liveline led to a record increase in organ donor card requests in Ireland.

== Life and career ==
Deasy was a native of Artane, Dublin. He initially worked as a child carer with Ireland's Eastern Health Board. He relocated to Glasgow, Scotland, where he died in 2009, having "liked it so much he never came home".

His career credits include Prime Suspect and The Passion. James Walton of The Daily Telegraph described The Passion as "exactly the kind of intelligent and engaging drama you'd expect from a series written by Frank Deasy". For RTÉ he wrote Father & Son, which achieved 26% and 27% audience shares for its first two episodes broadcast on RTÉ One in 2009 and was consistently within Ireland's Top Ten television programmes throughout its run. Father & Son features a character, Barrington Smith, who suffers from kidney malfunction and must escape from prison to find a cure. In spite of this success, John Spain in the Irish Independent commented that Deasy was still not very well known in Ireland at this time. He also wrote films and had a co-credit on Miramax's Prozac Nation, featuring Christina Ricci, Jessica Lange and Lou Reed. Deasy was working on Gaza, a BBC Films drama due to begin filming in October 2009, at the time of his death. One year before his death, Gaza featured on the "Brit List", which features the most deserving unproduced screenplays in Ireland and the United Kingdom. He was also supposed to be writing an eight-part BBC drama series about the House of Medici. He was also due to follow a family over a century for RTÉ.

=== Health ===
"I am only one of thousands of patients on organ transplant lists in Britain, living on our own, invisible, death row."

— Deasy spoke in public in The Observer days before his death.

Deasy was first diagnosed with liver cancer four years before his death. He underwent surgery to remove the tumour but it was found to have returned in January 2009.

Days before his death from the disease, Deasy began discussing his condition in public forums. On his final Sunday, The Observer featured an article detailing his suffering and using it to request more organ donors. Deasy said: "I am only one of thousands of patients on organ transplant lists in Britain, living on our own, invisible, death row". Actor Dougray Scott, who starred in Deasy's drama Father & Son, supported him in The Observer. Deasy's words were echoed in The Observer's editorial which called for an enforcement of presumed consent.

The following day, Deasy's story was carried by The Scotsman newspaper. Later that day, he appeared on Joe Duffy's Liveline programme on RTÉ Radio 1 appealing for more organ donors and insisting that it was a "very urgent matter". On the day his death was reported it was confirmed that a record of at least 5,500 people had applied to become holders of organ donor cards since the interview, 2,000 immediately afterwards and a further 3,500 the following day. By comparison, a similar request on The Late Late Show in 2007 yielded only 1,000 more donor applicants. The Evening Herald carried Deasy's story on 16 September, one day before his death in The Royal Infirmary of Edinburgh. The figures had risen to 10,000 one day after Deasy's death, three times the amount usually received during an annual appeal.

His blood group (B) is that which makes up 10% of people, meaning he could only have received a transplant from such a group. Deasy resided in Scotland at the time of his death in hospital. He was survived by his wife, Marie and their three children. A seminar on organ donation inspired by Deasy took place in Dublin seven weeks to the day after his death.

=== Tributes ===
Mark Murphy, CEO of the Irish Kidney Association, praised Deasy's "selflessness" during his final days alive. Anthony Jones, Deasy's literary agent, said he was a "wonderful, funny, tough and clever man". RTÉ Television's commissioning editor for Drama, Jane Gogan, said Deasy "brought a tremendous honesty and passionate intensity to his work" who "will be a big loss as a friend and inspiration to those he worked with but, more importantly, as a husband and father his loss will be incalculable". Actor Dougray Scott called Deasy "quite simply the most extraordinary and brilliant writer I have ever worked with and one of the most extraordinary and beautiful men I was blessed to have met" and said: "Today a great, great man was taken away from us. Very few times in life is one fortunate and blessed enough to meet a person like Frank Deasy. [...] Whenever I spent time or talked with Frank I always felt the warmth, wisdom and sheer joy of life that I remember getting from my own father. That's how special he was to me. He had everything I admire in a human being. Protective, caring and loving to his very special wife and children. And brave. So brave. Frank Deasy will be with me always". In its editorial on 18 September 2009, the Evening Herald said Deasy "gave hope to thousands".

== Awards and nominations ==
| Year | Award | Category | Work | Result |
|---|---|---|---|---|
| 1993 | British Academy Television Award | Best Single Drama | The Grass Arena | Nominated |
| 1999 | RTS Programme Award | Best Writer | Looking After Jo Jo | Nominated |
| 2007 | British Academy Television Award | Best Drama Serial | Prime Suspect: The Final Act | Nominated |
| 2007 | British Academy Television Award | Best Writer | Prime Suspect: The Final Act | Nominated |
| 2007 | Primetime Emmy Award | Outstanding Writing for a Miniseries, Movie or a Dramatic Special | Prime Suspect: The Final Act | Won |
| 2009 | ZeBBie Award | Best Television Script | Father & Son (Episode 1) | Won |
| 2010 | Irish Film & Television Award | Script (Television) | Father & Son | Won |
