= Eamonn Keane (actor) =

Irish actor (1925–1990)

Eamonn Patrick Keane (born Edmund Keane; 30 March 1925 – 7 January 1990) was an Irish actor.

Keane was born in Listowel, County Kerry and was a brother of the playwright John B. Keane. He was a member of the Radio Éireann Players and appeared in many of the station's drama productions on both radio and television. In 1966, he won a Jacob's Award for his performance in RTÉ Television's production When do you die – Friend? He won a second Jacob's Award in 1972, this time for his contribution to radio drama. He was part of yet another Jacob's Award-winning production in 1982, as a member of the RTÉ Players, when he played Simon Dedalus in RTÉ Radio's unabridged, 30-hour, marathon broadcast of James Joyce's novel Ulysses.

He played the part of Dan Paddy Andy in the 1990 film adaptation of his brother's play The Field. He had appeared in the play's world première at Dublin's Olympia Theatre in 1965, on that occasion taking the role of 'The Bull' McCabe's sidekick, 'The Bird' O'Donnell.

Keane died at Tralee General Hospital, aged 64. He was married to Maura Hassett from whom he separated in 1970. They had three children, Fergal, Eamon and Niamh. The eldest, Fergal Keane, is a well-known journalist and broadcaster.

== See also ==
- Eamonn Keane (weightlifter)
