= Liveline =

Irish radio chat show

- Genre: Interview / phone-in chat
- Running time: 13:45 – 15:00
- Country of origin: Ireland
- Language: English
- Home station: RTÉ Radio 1
- Starring: Kieran Cuddihy(November 2025- Present) various (June 2025 - November 2025); Joe Duffy (1999-2025); Marian Finucane (1985-1999)
- Produced by: Jack Murphy
- Recording studio: Donnybrook, Dublin 4
- Original release: present
- Audio format: FM and Digital radio
- Website: Official site
- Podcast: Liveline

Liveline is an Irish radio interview and phone-in chat show broadcast on RTÉ Radio 1 each weekday afternoon between 13.45 and 15.00. The programme, which was presented from 1999 to 2025 by Joe Duffy — "Talk to Joe", — tends to seek the public's opinion on various questions and debates, and invites conversation on current events and controversies. It also gives a platform to those who have suffered grievances or distressing events, and wish to raise awareness of them on the national airwaves. According to The New York Times, it is Ireland's "most popular radio call-in program". According to the Irish Independent, "[Joe Duffy's] greeting at 1.45pm every weekday—"Hello, good afternoon and you're very welcome to Liveline"—is the signal for 400,000 listeners to sit back and await some lively debate or the exposure of a scam or a social scandal".

From its initial launch in 1985, Liveline was presented and produced by Marian Finucane and Doireann Ní Bhriain, but was taken over in 1999 by Joe Duffy. During his absence, the role of presenter was typically filled by RTÉ presenters Katie Hannon, Philip Boucher-Hayes, or Damien O'Reilly; or prior to his death, Derek Davis. Sporadically, Liveline airs "Funny Fridays", a comedic departure from the usual programme, which tend to be broadcast from various hotels around Ireland, and before an audience. On "Funny Friday", Joe Duffy was joined by a series of comedians who tell jokes, and perform humorous songs. Regular contributing comedians include Brush Shiels and Brendan "Doc" Savage.

As an example of typical programming, in early August of 2007, Liveline ran a series of programmes focusing on the problems experienced by those who holiday abroad, regaling listeners with stories of the dangers of foreign resorts, and the corruption of Turkish and other local police authorities, and warnings of grasping and inhospitable hotel managements. Equally, the poor behaviour of young Irish holiday makers was also highlighted. Callers also aired their grievances over topics such as bikini-wearing models.

In September of 2009, the screenwriter Frank Deasy appeared on Liveline several days before his death from liver cancer to discuss organ donor awareness. A record of at least 5,500 people soon applied to become holders of organ donor cards, 2,000 immediately afterwards and a further 3,500 the following day. By comparison, a similar request on The Late Late Show in 2007 yielded only 1,000 more donor applicants. Mark Murphy, CEO of the Irish Kidney Association, put it down to "the power of Joe Duffy".

On 8 May 2025, Joe Duffy announced that he would be retiring from RTÉ after 37 years with his final Liveline show on 27 June 2025. The final show featured entertainers such as Paul Harrington and June Rodgers a tribute from Taoiseach Micheál Martin by phone and a letter from President Michael D. Higgins.

In October 2025, Virgin Media Television and former Newstalk presenter Kieran Cuddihy, was announced as Duffy’s permanent replacement.

Another completely unrelated radio show called Liveline! airs in the United States and plays Top 40 music. It is hosted by Mason Kelter, who is based in Boston, Massachusetts and started in May 2020. That version of Liveline! is syndicated to more than 70 affiliates as of March 2026 and airs live for five hours, six nights a week.

== Controversies ==
=== Michael McDowell interference ===
Joe Duffy thought about resigning from RTÉ in 2007 after the broadcaster forced him to give Justice Minister Michael McDowell a platform on Liveline to make a "party political broadcast". Duffy considered it "direct party-political interference" in Liveline.

=== Gay adoption debate ===
Whilst presenting Liveline as a stand-in host for regular presenter Joe Duffy in February 2007, Evelyn O'Rourke found herself playing host to a debate on gay adoption. The debate featured heated discussions with journalist Hermann Kelly following the publication of an article he wrote in the Irish Mail on Sunday in which he criticised the notion of gays and lesbians adopting children. Kelly criticised the foster father Colm O'Gorman, the director of the charity "One in Four", and a prospective election candidate for the Progressive Democrats in Wexford.

. Following the debate a number of complaints were aired by listeners centring on the conduct of O'Rourke and alleging that she had cut Kelly off, had interrupted him on occasions, and had left him to defend his stance alone against several hostile callers. A Mary Moriarty, amongst five listeners to complain about the debate, told the Broadcasting Complaints Commission (BCC) that callers had made slanderous remarks on Kelly several times and had not been asked for an apology or retraction of their statements. O'Rourke unwittingly and accidentally revealed her support for gay adoption by referring to the pro-gay adoption callers as "we" when discussing the matter. The BCC decided that the show had not been impartial and that O'Rourke's quick questioning of Kelly had been "unfair". Journalist Eoin McMahon expressed his disgust in the Sunday Independent:

If a journalist or pro-homosexual activist writes an article promoting homosexual rights, three guesses whether Liveline would devote an entire programme rubbishing the article, with the presenter coaxing and cajoling irate callers to put the boot in. The silenced majority: they haven't gone away you know.

=== Slanderous airings ===
Transport minister Martin Cullen and his former PR adviser, Monica Leech, sought compensation in 2005 for damage to their reputation after a caller to Liveline made lewd suggestions about them live on air.

=== 2008 financial crisis / bank running / government outrage controversy ===
Liveline has been censured by the government for host Joe Duffy's repeated attempts to continually discuss the effects of the 2008 financial crisis on Ireland. This followed on from the outrage caused when Duffy was held responsible by Finance Minister, Brian Lenihan for inciting widespread public fear that Irish citizens were on the verge of losing their savings. During the 2008 financial crisis, several callers freely spoke of their lack of confidence in the banking system, of how they had withdrawn their money from banks, some of which were identified, and were either carrying it around on their person, or considering keeping it "under the mattress", or burying it in their garden. Duffy inflamed the situation further by asking a woman what it felt like carrying over €70,000 "down the street", and a man how he would feel carrying his savings with him "on the bus" before opining that the banks would not be believed if they stated the system was working as normal. Lenihan personally rang Cathal Goan, then the Director-General of RTÉ, on 18 September 2008 (the date of the show) to express his outrage at the sudden increase in potentially disastrous speculation following the show.

Duffy and his Liveline production team were rebuked by RTÉ's management. A senior figure in Irish banking called the show "absolutely its single most destructive broadcast ever". RTÉ publicly defended Duffy and Liveline but behind the scenes was said to be deeply embarrassed, even permitting the Sunday newspapers to "castigate" Liveline. Duffy wished to return to the issue the following day, having prepared and even broadcast a promotional piece, but was firmly ruled over by management who decided otherwise, "the damage having already been done". The extent of the Finance Minister's concern first publicly emerged the following morning when he was interviewed by RTÉ's economics editor George Lee. In that interview, Lenihan insisted that deposits were not in any danger and said that people should not be going to banks to shift their deposit accounts "on the basis of unfounded allegations made on radio programmes".

=== Gender bias ===
One councillor voiced her outrage in October 2008 that an upcoming All-Island Public Consultation conference would feature 17 male speakers. No women were in the conference's line-up.

=== 2022 broadcasts on transgender issues ===
In June 2022, several consecutive episodes of Liveline were broadcast which focused on the discussion of transgender issues. The broadcasts were subsequently criticised by LGBTQ+ activists and others, with Ailbhe Smyth accusing the programme of enabling "hate speech", and RTE receiving nine formal complaints. After the episodes were aired, Dublin Pride announced that they would be terminating their media partnership with RTÉ, with a statement from the group saying they were "angered and disappointed" by the discussions held on the broadcasts, and criticising "anti-trans rhetoric" on the programme.
