= Njål Høstmælingen =

Norwegian lawyer and law researcher

Njål Høstmælingen is a Norwegian lawyer and law researcher known for his legal and law-related books and publications since 1998.

== Biography ==
He became a PhD candidate in Law. in 1992. After a brief stint as a scientific assistant to Professor Torkel Opsahl, he served as a magistrate for two and a half years at the Nes tributary office and subsequently obtained his lawyer's license.

In 1996, he took office as head of the Independent Institute for Human Rights (IMR), which later became part of the University of Oslo. In 1995 and 1996, he edited three volumes of Torkel Opsahl's subsequent manuscripts (State Power and Human Rights and Law and Equality). In 1996 he edited the book Implementation of human rights in Norwegian law, and in 1998 freedom of life and belief in a human rights perspective.

In 2007–2008, he was head of the National Institute for Human Rights, which at that time was part of the Norwegian Center for Human Rights. He is a frequent chronicler in Aftenposten and Dagbladet, contributes to various programs in NRK and is a widely used speaker. He has been a member of the Biotechnology Board, the board of the Norwegian Association for International Law and the board of the Norwegian Red Cross.

== Remarkable publications ==
- Njål Høstmælingen (ed.), Implementation of human rights in Norwegian law, 1996
- Njål Høstmælingen (ed.), Freedom of View and Belief in a Human Rights Perspective, 1998
- Bente Schei and Njål Høstmælingen, The Health Handbook, 1999. [2]
- Njål Høstmælingen, International Human Rights, 2003
- Njål Høstmælingen (ed.), Hijab in Norway, Abstract Publishing, 2004
- Njål Høstmælingen, What are human rights in the Universitetsforlaget series What is, 2005
- Njål Høstmælingen, Tore Lindholm and Ingvill Plesner (ed.), State, Church and Human Rights, Abstract Publishing, 2006
- Njål Høstmælingen, Elin Saga Kjørholt and Kirsten Sandberg, The Children's Convention: Children's Rights in Norway, first published in 2008
- Njål Høstmælingen, Turban to trouble: Human rights challenges with the Norwegian requirement for visible ears in passport and ID photographs

In 2019 he wrote a comprehensive article in "Kritisk juss" where he concluded that the Norwegian passports and national ID cards regulations around visible ears violates the Sikhs’ religious obligation to wear ear-covering turbans, and thus limits their freedom of religion or belief, right to respect for privacy, freedom of movement, right to democratic participation and freedom from discrimination.
