= Ulysses (broadcast) =

Radio broadcast of James Joyce's novel "Ulysses"

Ulysses James Joyce Complete Recording

Studio album by RTÉ Players
- Recorded: 1982
- Genre: Drama
- Length: 29:44:55
- Label: RTÉ with the Lannan Foundation

The Ulysses broadcast began on 16 June 1982 (Bloomsday) when the Irish state broadcaster, RTÉ Radio, transmitted an uninterrupted 30-hour dramatised radio performance, by 33 actors of the RTÉ Players, of the entire text of James Joyce's epic 1922 novel, Ulysses, to commemorate the centenary of the author's birth (born 2 February 1882). The broadcast began at 6.30 am and continued until midday the next day. It was carried by live relay internationally, and it won a Jacob's Broadcasting Award in recognition of its achievement.

Writing in The Spectator, John Phipps said, "I can't praise it enough. It is a masterpiece, a rare, enduring example of radio drama as art" and "The RTÉ players give performances of great clarity and insight."

The full 30-hour broadcast was repeated for the first time in 38 years on RTÉ Radio 1 Extra on 16 June 2020, beginning at 8 am. The decision to repeat the transmission was influenced by the death in January of that year of Joyce's grandson and literary estate executor, Stephen Joyce, and by the quarantine introduced in Ireland to limit the spread of the COVID-19 virus. It was broadcast once again on the 120th anniversary of Bloomsday on Radio 1 Extra on 16 June 2024.

The novel Ulysses contains about 265,000 words from a vocabulary of 30,030 words. This record-breaking and historic live literary broadcast was originally released to the public, after the broadcast, as a recording on 20 audio cassettes in 1982 and later digitally remastered on compact disc in two formats: as a 32-CD boxed set, and as a three-CD set of MP3 audio files, released in 2004 (OCLC 315482641 and 605276262).

== Track listing (MP3 version) ==
Disc 1	Length 9:57:05	
Track	Episode	Time
01	Telemachus	45:52
02	Nestor	32:26
03	Proteus	48:07
04	Calypso	45:44
05	Lotus Eaters	42:25
06	Hades	1:08:58
07	Aeolus	1:07:59
08	Lestrygonians 1	52:06
09	Lestrygonians 2	31:45
10	Scylla and Charybdis 1	56:11
11	Scylla and Charybdis 2	20:14
12	Wandering Rocks 1	1:01:06
13	Wandering Rocks 2	24:12

Disc 2	Length 10:02:29	
Track	Episode	Time
14	Sirens 1	1:10:04
15	Sirens 2	27:08
16	Cyclops 1	1:02:11
17	Cyclops 2	1:11:08
18	Nausicaa 1	58:34
19	Nausicaa 2	45:15
20	Oxen of the Sun 1	57:13
21	Oxen of the Sun 2	1:03:10
22	Oxen of the Sun 3	20:06
23	Circe 1	1:07:56
24	Circe 2	59:44

Disc 3	Length 9:45:21	
Track	Episode	Time
25	Circe 3	1:09:00
26	Circe 4	1:01:19
27	Circe 5	30:53
28	Eumaeus 1	1:01:14
29	Eumaeus 2	1:11:34
30	Ithaca 1	55:05
31	Ithaca 2	58:39
32	Ithaca 3	42:43
33	Penelope 1	59:08
34	Penelope 2	54:46
35	Penelope 3	21:00
Total length 29:44:55

== Broadcast personnel (the RTÉ Players) ==
Narrators

- Conor Farrington
- Peter Dix
- Brendan Cauldwell
- Aiden Grennell
- Tomas Studley
- Deirdre O'Meara

Cast

- Leopold Bloom – Ronnie Walsh
- Molly Bloom – Pegg Monahan
- Stephen Dedalus – Patrick Dawson
- Buck Mulligan – Gerry McArdle
- Mr. Deasy – Brendan Cauldwell
- Myles Crawford – Seamus Forde
- Bantam Lyons – Jim Reid
- Simon Dedalus – Eamon Keane
- Haines – Laurence Foster
- Miss Douce – Colette Proctor
- Miss Kennedy – Barbara McCaughey
- Nosy Flynn – Gerald Fitzmahony
- Ben Dollard – Breandán Ó Dúill
- Ned Lambert – Denis Staunton
- W.B. Murphy – Liam O'Callaghan
- Cyril Sargent – Brendan Conroy
- Colm – Colm Hefferon
- Zoe Higgins – Marcella O'Riordan
- Bella Cohen – Eileen Colgan
- John Henry Menton – Eoin White
- The Nymph – Cathryn Brennan
- Virag – Christopher Casson
- Old Gummy Granny – Neasa Ní Annracháin
- Stephen's Mother – Joan Plunkett
- Mrs. Yelverton-Barry – Daphne Carroll
- Cissy Caffrey – Kate Minogue
- Alf Bergin – Joe Taylor
- The Gaffer – Ivan Hanly

Production personnel

- Text Consultant – Roland McHugh
- Sound Supervision – Marcus Mac Donald
- Executive Producer – Micheál Ó hAodha
- Director – William Styles
