= Women Today =

Irish radio/television programme

Women Today The Women's Programme
- Genre: Phone-in chat / Interview
- Running time: 14:00 – 14:30
- Country of origin: Ireland
- Language(s): English
- Home station: RTÉ Radio 1 RTÉ One
- Starring: Marian Finucane; Doireann Ní Bhriain
- Produced by: Clare Duignan; Betty Purcell; Patrick Farrelly (1979–80); Nuala O'Faolain (1983–86)
- Recording studio: Donnybrook, Dublin 4
- Original release: present
- Audio format: FM radio Monaural (television) (1983–86)

Women Today (later The Women's Programme on television) was a pioneering Irish radio programme that was not only geared toward women's issues, but hosted and produced by women as well. It was a first for RTÉ Radio in that such a programme, almost completely run by women, had never been attempted before.

The 30-minute programme first aired on RTÉ Radio 1 on 31 May 1979, and thereafter five days a week until 21 October 1983. On 24 October 1983, the programme was retooled as a 30-minute programme for RTÉ1 television, The Women's Programme, airing until 1986.

== Conception and broadcast history ==
RTÉ Radio was slow to consider women's programming compared to the BBC in the UK. RTÉ's first female-centred programme, Dear Frankie, featuring agony aunt Frankie Byrne, was only first heard on the airwaves in 1963, whereas in the UK, BBC Radio committed to ideas similar to Woman's Hour as early as 1923.

Women Today was the brainchild of Clare Duignan, who would later go on to serve as controller for RTÉ Radio. Duignan wanted to create a show that specifically addressed women's concerns while also simultaneously addressing how female journalists and media personalities had been sidelined at RTÉ until her concept came to fruition.

Duignan, with co-producer Patrick Farrelly, brought together who she felt were the top female reporters on RTÉ Radio at the time and pitched the idea of an all-female show discussing issues that were true and authentic to women, not simply what men thought would pique women's interests. Duignan picked Marian Finucane, who had served as reporter on the programme Day by Day, to host the series in-studio and Doireann Ní Bhriain to serve as the show's reporter for stories outside the studio. In addition, Betty Purcell served as co-producer and Hilary Orpen assisted Ní Bhriain in reporting duties.

Women Today launched on RTÉ Radio 1 on 31 May 1979 and the show became an instant hit with its target demographic. In the programme's first year, Finucane was critically acclaimed for her documentary-style reporting on two issues in particular. The first, the controversial opening of Ireland's first Rape Crisis Centre, saw Finucane, with the help of centre volunteer Mary Doran, clearly outline situations that were indeed scenarios of rape, such as a friend going too far after a night at the pub, even though public opinion might not have seen it that way at that time. Normalising such frank conversations allowed more women to take ownership over their bodies and seek help they might not have otherwise. In the other report, Finucane followed an Irish woman who planned to travel to England for an abortion, with the process chronicled from beginning to end. Entitled "The Lonely Crisis", this documentary would go on to win the Prix d’Italia from the Italian Press Association. Finucane was the host of the series until 1980, when Ní Bhriain took over hosting duties.

Women Today would air for 30 minutes five days a week until 21 October 1983, when it was replaced with a similar programme on television the next Monday, 24 October 1983, called The Women's Programme, with the involvement of Duignan, Finucane, Ní Bhriain, and also Nuala O'Faolain in the role of co-producer. This programme would run until 1986, when it was ended due to the concurrent involvement of Finucane and Ní Bhriain in the radio programme Liveline.

== Impact of Women Today ==
"Women’s issues had been purely swept under the carpet for so many years. Our job was to go out and explore that. It wasn’t journalists who were highlighting these issues at the time, it was activists on the ground and people who weren’t activists at all. We’d read out a letter on air and then a bunch of other letters would come in because women who were going through the same thing would identify with it. We facilitated the conversation."

—Doireann Ní Bhriain, speaking on the impact of Women Today in 2020.

Women Today was instrumental in bringing light to many critical women's issues. Prior to this, women's programmes mainly centred on topics such as homemaking and cooking, which, while significant to many Irish housewives, were not reflective of all women's experiences. Women Today confronted a broad array of subjects that hadn't previously been openly discussed in Irish media, with the exception of some letters to Gay Byrne on The Late Late Show. The program provided a platform for women to not only hear about issues pertinent to their lives, but also to call in and express their own opinions – albeit many times anonymously, due to the social culture prevalent at the time.

Women Today highlighted crucial issues for Irish women in the late 1970s and early 1980s, ranging from women's rights, societal roles, professional opportunities, and quest for equal pay, to physical and mental health, reproductive rights, domestic violence, and representation in media and politics. The show's discussions had a profound impact, touching upon women's legal and voting rights, control over their bodies including birth control and prenatal care, societal expectations of women, and the importance of their role in the public sphere. It also focused on taboo topics such as sexual harassment, unequal treatment in the workplace, breaking societal norms, and domestic violence. At a time when divorce was essentially prohibited, Women Today proved to be an indispensable lifeline for many women stuck in desperate situations.

Despite its overwhelming success, Women Today was still controversial, especially considering it aired during peak listening times in the afternoon, when literally anyone turning on a radio could hear. In particular, one installment of the programme which discussed the topic of female orgasms in a frank manner resulted in hundreds of complaints being lodged to RTÉ by listeners. Finucane said of the show's sudden success, "[We were] broadcasting in peak time radio about aspects of women’s sexuality...which had [now] been talked about out loud. And they were being discussed on the open air and everybody could hear it. Men could hear it!...What bothered [the clergy the most] was that we were uppity women...and a threat to [their] moral authority". Ní Bhriain said in a retrospective, "If you’re getting in trouble all the time you know you’re doing something right. There were certain people who didn’t approve at all of what we were doing, they thought we were rabid feminists and used other dreadful language like that – of course some people still use that sort of language. We were left in no doubt that we were going a bit over the top, but that egged us on all the time."

Women Today also had an impact on the roles expected of female presenters on RTÉ, although perhaps not in the way Duignan had originally intended. In 1980, a report was submitted to the RTÉ Authority, which was later made public, boldly recommending that Marian Finucane never host the iconic Late Late Show as a replacement for Gay Byrne. As a result, Byrne devoted the topic of his next television broadcast to the representation of women in media, then giving his host's seat to Finucane to moderate the rest of the broadcast. The moment was important in Irish popular culture, signifying that even trusted institutions like Gay Byrne, arguably the face of RTÉ at the time, wanted the prevailing culture to change.

=== The Women's Programme ===
The show's successor programme, The Women's Programme, was similar in format and dealt with not just call-in discussions but also stories of women from across the country who were working tirelessly for equality. By the time The Women's Programme made it to television, the impact of women's stories making it to the airwaves was enough to bring about change in society. For example, a 1985 programme focusing on the situation of women workers in the town of Clonmel, improving over time but not fast enough for the local women, did eventually result in more women being given managerial positions across all local industries.

While The Women's Programme was effective in its message, could boast high production values, and had a proven track record of results, there were detractors, typically men, who viewed the programme as "Channel 4-like" (Note: In the UK and in Ireland, the station Channel 4, which began broadcasting in November 1982, was viewed as risqué and even pornographic by many viewers due to its programming strategy which did include a degree of sex and nudity – in the late hours of the evening and overnight, not anywhere near the daytime slot the programme was given on RTÉ1. In short, the men quoted in Magill viewed the women's issues discussed on the programme as too daring for Irish television.) and "a further manifestation of 15 years of women pushing, pushing, pushing" as described in Magill magazine.
