= Brendan Cauldwell =

Irish actor

Brendan Cauldwell (25 October 1922 – 12 January 2006) was an Irish radio, film and television actor.

== Early life and education ==
Cauldwell was born in Fairview, Dublin. He was educated at O'Connell's Irish Christian Brothers School and went on to work in the insurance industry before becoming a full-time actor.

== Career ==
His interest in acting was encouraged by his uncle, who taught him different dialects in an attempt to manage his stammer.

In 1955, he joined the RTÉ Repertory Company. While with the company, he took part in more than 3,000 productions including the international 32-hour broadcast of Ulysses, the longest ever radio drama. In 1961, he performed in The Weaver's Grave. Adapted and produced by Mícheál Ó hAodha, it was written by Galway author Seamus O'Kelly, and won the Prix Italia for Radio Drama. He played another Joycean role when he acted as Father Michael in Joseph Strick's film, A Portrait of the Artist as a Young Man (1977).

His performance as Hennessy in the RTÉ Television production of Strumpet City is regarded as particularly memorable, alongside an earlier performance as Rashers Tierney in the RTÉ Radio 1 production.

He acted in a number of stage, film, and radio productions, including Far and Away and Angela's Ashes. In 1996, he joined the cast of television programme Fair City, playing war veteran Paschal Mulvey, where he worked until 2005.

== Personal life ==
Cauldwell died in his sleep in 2006, aged 83.

== Filmography ==
=== Film ===
Year	Title	Role	Notes
1962	The Playboy of the Western World	Jimmy Farrell	
1962	The Quare Fellow	Shamrock Attendant	
1967	Ulysses	Bob Doran	
1971	Flight of the Doves	Club Manager	Uncredited
1973	Italian Graffiti	The Chemist	
1977	A Portrait of the Artist as a Young Man	Father Michael	
1980	It's Handy When People Don't Die	The Seanchai	
1981	Tristan & Isolde	1st Baron	
1986	The Fantasist	Hotel Bar Drinker	
1992	Far and Away	Tavern Keeper	
1994	War of the Buttons	War of the Buttons	
1994	Ailsa	Moloney	
1996	Moll Flanders	Mr. 100 Guineas	
1996	Messaggi quasi segreti	Night Porter	
1999	Angela's Ashes	Mr. O'Halloran	
2004	The Halo Effect	Old Man Willie	

=== Television ===
Year	Title	Role	Notes
1962	Siopa	Stan Adams	Series
1966	Insurrection	Drunk	Episode: "Tuesday, 25 April 1916: Law and Self-Restraint"
1978	The Heart's a Wonder	Jimmy Farrell	Television film
1980	Strumpet City	Hennessy	7 episodes
1981	Manions of America	Editor	Episode: "Part II"
1981	Die Rosen von Dublin	Seamus	6 episodes
1983	The Irish R.M.	Con Brickley	Episode: "The Boat's Share"
1990	Who Bombed Birmingham?	Callaghan	Television film
1994	Screen Two	Fisherman	Episode: "All Things Bright and Beautiful"
1996	Draiocht	Grandfather	Television film
1997	EastEnders	Priest	Episode dated 25 September 1997
1997	Fair City	Pascal Mulvey	Episode dated 24 December 1997
1998	The Wonderful World of Disney	Isaac Levy	Episode: "Miracle at Midnight"
1999	Mystic Knights of Tir Na Nog	Grudye	Episode: "The Trial of Angus"
2004	Stew	Various characters	Episode #1.6
