= Doireann Ní Bhriain =

Irish independent radio producer (born 1952)

- Born: 1952 (age 73–74); Dublin, Ireland
- Education: University College Dublin (UCD)
- Occupations: Radio producer; voice and presentation trainer, voiceover artist
- Employer: RTÉ (1972–1993)
- Known for: Radio and television journalism

Doireann Ní Bhriain (pronounced [ˈdˠɛɾʲən̪ˠ n̠ʲiː ˈvʲɾʲiənʲ]; born 1952) is an Irish independent radio producer. She began her career as a radio and television journalist, and started out reading children's stories on television. From those beginnings, she went on to work for the Irish broadcaster RTÉ for over 20 years before moving on in 1993. She is best known for her work and affiliation with RTÉ Radio 1.

She was a long-running reporter on the radio current affairs programme Women Today, for which she is well known. She was the presenter of the Eurovision Song Contest 1981, held in Dublin. In 1993, she won a Jacob's Award for her work on RTÉ Radio.

== Early life ==
Ní Bhriain was the first of three children born in Dublin in 1952, to Neasa Ní Annracháin, an actress, and Seán Ó Briain, a civil servant. She made her broadcasting debut at the age of eight in a radio play with her mother, who was part of the Radio Éireann Players. Bilingual in Irish and English, she studied at the University College Dublin and graduated in French and Spanish.

== Early career, 1972–1981 ==
Ní Bhriain started her career with RTÉ in 1972, as a presenter of children's programmes. She then went on to co-present the magazine show Tangents and became one of the first Irish female broadcasters to break into current affairs. She worked as a presenter of the flagship Irish language programme, Féach. She took a break from journalism in 1976 and spent a year in Kenya, teaching in a rural school, and later in Nairobi.

In 1979, she became a reporter on the landmark radio current affairs programme, Women Today, which was hosted at that time by Marian Finucane. She subsequently became presenter of the programme after Finucane's departure.

== Eurovision 1981 ==
Outside Ireland, Ní Bhriain is best known for being the solo presenter of the 1981 Eurovision Song Contest. The dress she wore for the occasion was designed by Richard Lewis, while the gold jewellery was designed by Mary Grey.

In a 2004 interview with the Sunday Times (Irish edition), she said of the experience, "I did it for a laugh...it was offered me because I was quite well known, and because I spoke French and Irish with some ease...I always tell people that there was no autocue in those days: I had to learn it all off."

Ní Bhriain provided the RTÉ Radio commentary for the 1991 Contest.

== Radio work, 1981–1993 ==
After hosting Eurovision 1981, Ní Bhriain left RTÉ again, this time to pursue a scholarship granted to her from the Journalists in Europe programme in Paris. On her return, she co-presented The Women's Programme with Marian Finucane. This was a groundbreaking, prime-time magazine and current affairs programme. She also worked the RTÉ Belfast newsroom (where she met her husband, Andy Pollak) and presented the Book Programme on RTÉ Radio 1. The late 1980s saw her take her first courses in radio production, and soon after she worked as a producer on The Arts Show with Mike Murphy. She also produced several radio documentaries, winning a Jacob's Award in 1983 for her work with Nuala Hayes on 'Moving Statues', a documentary on the work of sculptor Louise Walsh. She left RTÉ in 1993 to run the L'Imaginaire Irlandais festival in France, living between Dublin and Paris until the festival was over in 1996.

== Career in the 2000s ==
In 2000, she moved on to work in arts project management and consultancy for a number of years. She developed an expertise in festival management and cultural tourism. She also continued to work in radio as an independent producer, producing series on volunteering, on minority religions in Ireland, on urban development in Ireland, and documentaries for RTÉ radio and Raidió na Gaeltachta. In recent years, she has specialised in voice and presentation training, independent radio production and television voiceover work in English and Irish. Ní Bhriain currently provides the recorded announcements on the Luas, the tram system in Dublin, in both Irish and English.

== See also ==
- List of Eurovision Song Contest presenters

Preceded by (Netherlands) Marlous Fluitsma	Eurovision Song Contest presenter 1981	Succeeded by (United Kingdom) Jan Leeming
