= Reece Noi =

British actor

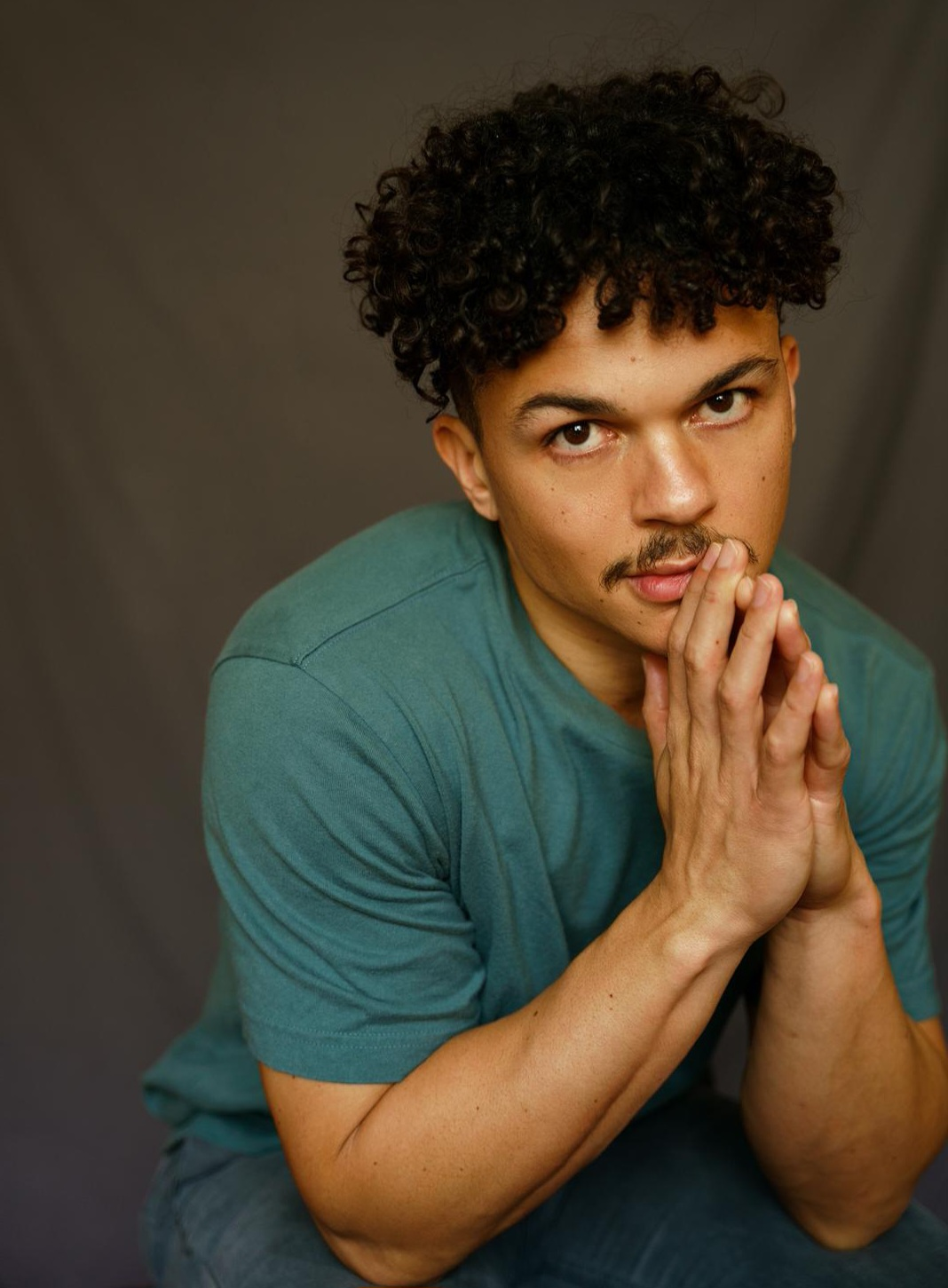
- Reece Noi in Los Angeles circa 2022
- Born: 13 June 1988 (age 38); Manchester, England
- Occupation: Actor
- Years active: 1999–present

Reece Noi (born 13 June 1988) is a British Ghanaian actor. He is best known for portraying Taylor Mitchell in the BBC school-based drama serial, Grange Hill, from 2004 to 2007, and also Noel Parkin and Earl Kelly in the second and fourth series of Waterloo Road in 2007 and 2009 respectively, and Mossador in the HBO series Game of Thrones. Noi also starred in the 2019 Emmy Nominated Netflix crime series When They See Us.

== Career ==
Noi started his career in Liverpool gangster film My Kingdom, a modern day re-telling of Shakespeare's King Lear playing The Fool opposite Richard Harris's Lear. He worked consistently on TV until he landed his role in Grange Hill which led to Noi being very much in demand and he went on to secure roles in the BBC dramas Conviction and Doctors, where he played terminally-ill teenager Sam. Next came a recurring role in Emmerdale as Ryan Hayworth during 2007 and 2008. In 2007, Noi joined BBC school drama Waterloo Road, playing a character named Noel Parkin in the 8th episode of Series 2, and later returned in 2009 to play bad boy Earl Kelly, who in the eighth episode of the series fatally shot his girlfriend Maxine Barlow (played by Ellie Paskell).

Noi made an appearance in the Channel 4 series Shameless, series 4 episode 5, as Debbie's Christian boyfriend, Luke Newman. He also had guest roles of Carl in BBC series Paradox and Tyler Simmons in ITV series The Bill in 2009.

Noi starred alongside Sophie Okonedo and Dougray Scott in ITV four-part drama Father And Son, playing Sean O'Connor on ITV1 in the spring of 2010. In 2011, he appeared in BBC law drama Silk. He then went on to play Levi in Sky Atlantic's Hit & Miss.

In 2012, Noi appeared in ITV2 supernatural comedy Switch alongside former EastEnders star Lacey Turner. He featured on a number of popular UK roles before then appearing in Game of Thrones from 2014 to 2015 as an emancipated slave, called Mossador. In a 2019 interview with Australian publication IF Magazine Noi stated that executive producers David Benoiff and D.B Weiss liked his work on Season 4 so much they then wrote Mossador for him.

Noi appeared in FOX networks mini serial Houdini and Doyle. In 2019 he took on the role of Matias Reyes in Ava DuVernay's Netflix mini series "When They See Us" based on the true story of the "Central Park Five" The show has since been nominated for sixteen Emmy Awards.

In 2022, Noi joined the second and final series of The Mysterious Benedict Society in the recurring role of Marlon alongside Tony Hale as Dr. Curtain.

=== Filmography ===
Year	Title	Role	Notes
2001	My Kingdom	The Boy	
2003	The Virgin of Liverpool	Wesley Churchill	
2010	Four Lions	Shoulderboy	
2010	Threads	Liam	Short film
2011	Seamonsters	Kieran	
2011	Friday	Aiden	Short film
2016	Bliss	Danny	
2016	K-Shop	Malik	
2017	Away	Damo	
2019	The Painters	Nacho	Short Film
2020	Unsound	Noah	
2022	Diary of a Spy	Camden	
2025	Tecie	Jose	

=== TV ===
Year	Title	Role	Notes
2000	Seeing Red	Wayne	
2003	Real Men	Lester	
2004	Outlaws	Ishanti	Guest
2004	Conviction	Darrell Milland	Guest
2004–2007	Grange Hill	Taylor Mitchell	Regular
2006	New Street Law	Adam Lake	Guest
2007	Waterloo Road	Noel Parkin	
2007	Dalziel and Pascoe	Dean Bennett	
2007	Shameless	Luke Newman	
2007	Doctors	Sam Davies	6 episodes
2007	Casualty	Marlon Miller	Guest
2007–2008	Emmerdale	Ryan Hayworth	5 episodes
2009	Waterloo Road	Earl Kelly	8 episodes
2009	Paradox	Carl	Episode 5
2009	The Bill	Tyler Simmons	Guest
2010	Father And Son	Sean O'Connor	
2011	Silk	Mark Draper	
2011	In with the Flynns	Wayne Barton	Guest
2011	Scott & Bailey	Frank Goff	Guest
2011	Casualty	Steve Baker	Guest
2012	Hit & Miss	Levi	
2012	Switch	Aaron	
2014–2015	Game of Thrones	Mossador	3 episodes
2016	Houdini & Doyle	Daniel Berry	
2019	When They See Us	Matias Reyes	TV mini-series
2022	The Mysterious Benedict Society	Marlon	Recurring

=== Video games ===
Year	Title	Role
2014	Dragon Age: Inquisition	Rion the Elementalist/Scout Pellane/Griffon Wing Keep Merchant/Herald's Rest Patron (voices)

=== Theatre ===
- A Streetcar Named Desire Young Collector at The Royal Exchange Theatre, Manchester
- Moonfleece (2010) Link

=== Radio Drama ===
- Zola-Sex (2016) Paul
- Porcelain (2014)
- Divided We Fall (2010) Carl
- Craven (2009) Michael Chambers
- Stone (2009) Tyler Hyman
- Takeaway (2007) Des
