= The Passion (2008 TV series) =

- Genre: Religious drama
- Written by: Frank Deasy
- Directed by: Michael Offer
- Starring: Joseph Mawle; Paloma Baeza; Ben Daniels; James Nesbitt; David Oyelowo; Penelope Wilton
- Composer: Debbie Wiseman
- Country of origin: United Kingdom
- No. of episodes: 4

Production
- Executive producer: Hillary Salmon
- Producer: Nigel Stafford-Clark
- Editor: Paul Knight
- Running time: 172 minutes
- Production companies: BBC Productions; HBO Films; Deep Indigo Productions

Original release
- Network: BBC One
- Release: 16 March – 23 March 2008

The Passion is a television drama serial produced by the BBC and HBO Films in association with Deep Indigo Productions. It tells the story of the last week in the life of Jesus. The serial was first proposed by Peter Fincham in 2006, on the success of the contemporary-set Manchester Passion. Writer Frank Deasy and producer Nigel Stafford-Clark were inspired to make a drama that opened up the story beyond the "vacuum" it is often told in. They did this by expanding the roles of Pontius Pilate and Caiaphas, and exploring the politics of Judea at the time. Deasy and Stafford-Clark were aided by scholar Mark Goodacre, with whom they put together an extensive research manual about the topic.

The part of Jesus is played by Joseph Mawle, who researched the role by reading the Gospels and research papers. Other main roles were played by Paloma Baeza (Mary Magdalene), Ben Daniels (Caiaphas), James Nesbitt (Pilate), David Oyelowo (Joseph of Arimathea), and Penelope Wilton (Mary). It was directed by Michael Offer on location in Morocco from 27 August to 23 October 2007, and broadcast on BBC One in four parts from 16 to 23 March 2008. Its viewing figures ranged from 3.2 million to 4.9 million people, and it received generally positive critical reception.

== Plot ==
Episode 1 — In the first hour-long episode, Jesus's arrival in Jerusalem on Palm Sunday causes a stir among the Jews. The Romans are having to deal with a small rebellion and the High Priest wants to be rid of Jesus, since he is causing a disturbance and challenging his authority.

Episode 2 — In the second half-hour episode, the High Priest Caiaphas calls a council to determine how Jesus should be dealt with after he is overheard mocking the Temple, and his fate is sealed.

Episode 3 — The third hour-long episode, relates the events from the Last Supper to the Crucifixion of Jesus.

Episode 4 — The final half-hour episode, features the Resurrection of Jesus, the sightings of him by Mary Magdalene and others, and his departure from the disciples after impressing upon Peter the importance of spreading his word. Caiaphus' wife gives birth to a son, and Pilate and his wife return to Caesarea.

== Production ==
At a conference in April 2006, Controller of BBC One Peter Fincham announced that following the success of the Manchester Passion—a contemporary retelling of the passion that was broadcast live from the streets of Manchester—a "straight" adaptation would be produced for broadcast in 2008. Fincham wanted it to be the "centrepiece" of BBC One's Easter 2008 schedule and hoped that it would have the same impact as Jesus of Nazareth did in the 1970s. Nigel Stafford-Clark, the producer of BBC One's successful 2005 adaptation of Bleak House, was brought on as producer, and a contract was tendered for a writer. Frank Deasy was announced as having won the contract in July 2006. Stafford-Clark chose him because he believed that Deasy understood the scale of the project. The production was budgeted at £4 million. Both Deasy and Stafford-Clark looked to emulate the style of The Gospel According to St. Matthew (Pier Paolo Pasolini, 1964) over The Passion of the Christ (Mel Gibson, 2004). Deasy had walked out of The Passion of the Christ after 20 minutes because it "drained the spirituality of Jesus". Jesus of Nazareth had opposite effect on him, in that he believed Franco Zeffirelli's version was too spiritual. In his version, Deasy wanted to "draw Jesus down into the world more as a human character who is frustrated, angry, fearful and doubtful, and who doesn't have what is almost a mask of humanity, but is truly human." Deasy and Stafford-Clark formed a development team, bringing on religion scholar Dr Mark Goodacre and the BBC's head of religion and ethics, Michael Wakelin. Together, they prepared a research manual containing as much information as they could find about Jerusalem, first-century lifestyles, and the gospels.

Following his appointment as writer, Deasy spent the next year researching the gospels in Israel and consulting Goodacre. His first draft was submitted in the autumn of 2006. Drawing on what he had learned from Jesus of Nazareth, Deasy chose to portray Jesus as the "human character" in Matthew and Mark, rather than the god-like figure in John. He also incorporated Jesus's relationship with women as written in Luke. For the opening scene of Episode 1, he was influenced by the opening scene of Downfall (Oliver Hirschbiegel, 2004):

In it, a peasant coming to Passover in Jerusalem is frightened when he comes across the disciples, because they've been in the desert or in Galilee for two years. They've been sleeping out and they appear slightly intimidating to him. It attempts to introduce a world in which Christianity didn't yet exist and these precepts and concepts that are so familiar to us now, were startlingly new and really exploded on the scene during this crucial week.

Deasy and Stafford-Clark were also interested in opening up the story beyond the "vacuum" in which they believe other depictions of the week are set. They did this by expanding the roles of Caiaphas and Pilate beyond mere "panto villains", and examining the politics of Judea at the time; Deasy explained that it was "much more rich to see Caiaphas as a flawed human being". Joseph Mawle was the first actor auditioned for the part of Jesus. He was cast in May 2007 and prepared for the role by reading "the Gospels, research papers, medical documents, endless books and prayers". Mawle wanted to meet actor Robert Powell to discuss his portrayal of Jesus in Jesus of Nazareth, but the two could not arrange a convenient time. By chance, the two met in the toilets at Gatwick Airport when Powell was going on holiday with his family and Mawle was leaving for Morocco to film The Passion. James Nesbitt was filming in Belfast when his agent sent him the script. He initially did not want the part, but took it when his agent told him that Stafford-Clark was the producer; Nesbitt had enjoyed his version of Bleak House. He played Pilate as "a cold, hard warrior", and was inspired—by the peace in Ireland—to play him Irish. Paloma Baeza felt a "responsibility" when she was offered the part of Mary Magdalene because of the scale of the story being told. Of playing Mary, she said, "I was looking at her journey, who this person was and her relationship to Jesus. And looking at her as a woman and her predicament."

Production was based at the Atlas Studios in Morocco. Sets were constructed on locations in Ouarzazate from May to August 2007. Principal photography took place from 27 August to 23 October. Scenes in Jerusalem were filmed in Tamnougalt. Many scenes were filmed with hand-held cameras to make it appear that the audience is "eavesdropping" on characters' conversations. A significant scene was the crucifixion in Episode 3. The scene was filmed over three days and was frequently interrupted by torrential downpours. Mawle's make-up call came at 3.30 a.m. and it took five hours to apply cuts, bruises and blisters to his body. As he carried the cross over the sand, Mawle imagined the pain and exhaustion Jesus felt when he did it. Contrary to traditional depictions of the crucifixion, where Jesus is shown nailed to the cross by his hands, production designer Simon Elliot chose to show Jesus in the foetal position, with the nails through his arms. Mark Goodacre advised that this was the most common and effective method of crucifixion used by the Romans, and Elliot believed that "the Victorian image" did not match historical evidence; The Passion's interpretation was based on a skeleton of a crucified man that was discovered near Jerusalem in the 1960s. 3,000 extras participated in the trial scenes in Episode 3.

The first episode was given a preview screening by the BBC at the Apollo West End cinema on 28 February 2008. The episode was introduced by BBC controller of fiction Jane Tranter to an invited audience of press and religious leaders. The producers delivered the final cut of Episode 4 on 11 March.

== Cast ==
Jesus and followers

- Paloma Baeza as Mary Magdalene
- Thomas Buchanan as James, son of Alphaeus
- Lewis Clay as Thomas
- Tom Ellis as Phillip
- Daniel Evans as Matthew
- Eoin Geoghegan as Andrew
- Dean Lennox Kelly as James
- Stuart Kidd as Simon
- Joseph Mawle as Jesus
- Darren Morfitt as Peter
- Steve Morphew as Thaddeus
- Paul Nicholls as Judas
- Vinette Robinson as Mina
- Jamie Sives as John
- Penelope Wilton as Mary
- Eugene Wood as Bartholomew

At the Temple

- Ben Caplan as Yehuda
- Ben Daniels as Caiaphas
- Laila El Mrabti as Caiaphas' daughter
- Laura Fraser as Abigail
- Simon Kassianides as Temple guard
- Munir Khairdin as Second Temple guard
- Denis Lawson as Annas
- John Lynch as Sagan
- David Oyelowo as Joseph of Arimathea
- Elif Yeşil as Nita, Caiaphas' servant

Romans

- Roger Ashton-Griffiths as Syrian prefect
- Mansour Badri as Roman sergeant at Golgotha
- El Housseine Dejjiti as Centurion at bakery
- Karim Doukkali as Garrison Centurion
- Robin Floriant as Rufus, tax collector
- Matthew Flynn as Third Roman soldier
- Esther Hall as Claudia, Pontius Pilate's wife
- Martin Hutson as Pilate's secretary
- Mark Lewis Jones as Marcus
- Gerard Monaco as Capito
- David Maybrick as First Roman soldier
- James Nesbitt as Pontius Pilate
- Ross O'Hennessy as Second Roman soldier
- Driss Roukhe as Roman soldier at procession
- Mohammed Taleb as Robe centurion

People in Jerusalem

- El Jirari Ben Aissa as Simon of Cyrene
- Daniel Catlagirone as Eban
- Stephen Graham as Barabbas
- Mercedes Grower as Neta
- Jamila El Haouni as Widow
- Johnny Harris as Asher
- Mustapha Jamal as Unhappy butcher
- Richard Katz as Money changer
- Barnaby Kay as Man on road to Emmaus
- Abderrahim Moustaid as Simon the Leper
- Craig Parkinson as Man at tomb
- Gary Pillai as Merchant
- Nadia Sadik as Screaming woman
- Abdelouahed Sanouji as Young baker
- Kiran Shah as Jude
- Peter Sullivan as Lawyer
- David Rubin as Pilgrim
- René Zagger as Bird seller

== Reception ==
The serial opened with an hour-long episode on 16 March, followed by a half-hour episode on 17 March, another hour-long episode on 21 March and a concluding half-hour episode on 23 March. An omnibus-style repeat of the first three parts was broadcast in the afternoon of 21 March. The first part opened with overnight ratings of 4.1 million viewers and a 15% audience share. The second episode, scheduled against popular ITV soap opera Coronation Street, dropped to 3.2 million. Episode 3 brought in 3.7 million viewers and Episode 4 received 4.9 million and a 21% share.

The series was generally well received. The main review in The Guardian of the first episode was positive, remarking "you could watch The Passion and totally forget that this story was central to a major world religion. And that's a good thing, I think." However, another article in the paper, discussing UK television over Easter 2008, called it "a dramatisation so conventional and reverent that the only harrumphing angle the papers have been able to find has been the position of the hands on the crucifix". The Independent's Thomas Sutcliffe commented that "only the most zealously dogmatic Christian could complain that it was irreverent", The Daily Telegraph's James Walton's review of the same episode praised the humanising of Pilate and Caiaphas, and felt Mawle's depiction of Jesus, despite not having the same "spell-binding effect as Robert Powell did in Jesus of Nazareth", nevertheless was "more appealingly human". Andrew Billen of The Times praised "some nice touches", but was overall more critical, calling Mawle's portrayal of Jesus too "meek, mild and hangdog".

Stephen Green, from Christian Voice, voiced disquiet over the series giving sympathetic portrayals to Caiaphas and Pilate, though press reactions found this unjustified.

== DVD release ==
The Passion was released on DVD in the UK by Acorn Media UK on 20 October 2008.
