= Torkel Opsahl =

Norwegian human rights scholar and professor

Torkel Opsahl (17 March 1931 in Stavanger — 16 September 1993 in Geneva) was a Norwegian human rights scholar, professor of the University of Oslo since 1965 and head of the board of its Human Rights Institute since 1987. From 1970 to 1984, he was a member of the European Commission of Human Rights. Between 1977 and 1986, he was a member of the UN Human Rights Committee. In 1992-1993 he chaired an independent commission exploring ways forward for Northern Ireland, out of which came the influential book 'A Citizens' Inquiry: the Opsahl Report on Northern Ireland'. Opsahl died from a heart attack at his office in Geneva on 16 September 1993. At the time of his death, he was chairing the UN commission on war crimes in the former Yugoslavia.

== See also ==
- Njål Høstmælingen
- Tove Stang Dahl
