= John Minihan (photographer) =

Irish photographer (born 1946)

John Minihan is an Irish photographer, born in Dublin in 1946 and raised in Athy, County Kildare. At the age of 12 he was brought to live in London, and went on to become an apprentice photographer with the Daily Mail. At the age of 15 he won the Evening Standard amateur photography competition. At 21, he became the youngest staff photographer for the Evening Standard. For thirty years he remained in London, returning every year to his hometown of Athy to record the people and their daily lives.

The work of Minihan in Athy makes up a large part of his canon. Minihan began taking photos in Athy when he was 16. The photos are an attempt to document the lives of the ordinary people of the town in their day-to-day business and also in times of joy and sadness, notably during the wake of a woman called Katy Tyrrell.

In between documenting Athy on visits home, Minihan continued his career on Fleet Street, which included the iconic snap of the 19-year-old Lady Diana Spencer in the garden of the nursery at which she worked, the morning sun to her back, her legs in silhouette through her skirt. Diana had just been announced as the Prince of Wales's love interest and photographers raced to take her photo, Minihan having the fortune to turn up first.

Over the years Minihan developed a close relationship with many writers and his photographs of Samuel Beckett show a particular affinity between the two men. Minihans photos of Beckett are some of his best known, one in particular is described as one of the greatest photos of the twentieth century. William S. Burroughs once referred to Minihan as "a painless photographer".

Minihan is perhaps best known for his photographs of Beckett. Minihan first expressed a desire to photograph Beckett in 1969, following Beckett's winning of the Nobel Prize for literature, having noticed that all the available photos of Beckett were of a poor quality;

'We were running a story but discovered there were only two very vague images of Beckett taken many years before. It was like he didn't exist - that was the moment I decided I wanted to meet this man and take his photograph.'

Minihan first encountered Beckett in London in 1980, while Beckett was working on a production of one of his own plays, Endgame. Minihan met Beckett in the Hyde Park hotel and showed him some of his photos of Athy to break the ice. The two met on a number of occasions over the next few years, but it was not until 1985 that they met in Paris. They arranged to meet in the restaurant of the Hotel PLM, a regular haunt of Beckett. At ten to five, with the light fading, Minihan took the photo that would go on to be called by some as the photograph of the twentieth century. John Calder credited Minihan with capturing,

'the introspective, infinitely sad gaze of a man looking into the abyss of the world's woes'.

Among his numerous photographic publications are Photographs: Samuel Beckett (1995); Shadows from the Pale, Portrait of an Irish Town (1996); and An Unweaving of Rainbows, Images of Irish Writers (1996).

He is currently a freelance photographer specialising in 'the arts'. His book of photographs of Samuel Beckett was published in 1995. His photographs of Athy have been exhibited throughout the world. He was given the freedom of Athy in 1990. Minihan currently lives and works in County Cork.

Minihan's many exhibitions in museums and galleries around the world include the Museum of Modern Art, Rio de Janeiro, 1984; Centre Georges Pompidou, Paris 1986; the National Portrait Gallery, London 1987/8 and the October Gallery, London 1990 as well as the Guinness Hop Store, Dublin 1991.
