= Organ donation in Ireland =

Ireland introduced an opt-out system for organ donation on June 17, 2025, under the Human Tissue Act 2024. All adults in Ireland are now considered organ donors unless they actively choose to opt out. However, it is ultimately up to their family to make the decision whether or not the person can donate their organs after they die.

New legislation introducing a soft opt out system of consent, in which consent for organ donation is assumed unless a person has opted out, is currently before the Irish upper house for consideration.

== Organ donation ==
Organ Donation and Transplant Ireland (Gaelic: Deonú agus Trasphlandú Organ Éireann), part of Ireland's Health Service Executive, manages the overall process of donation and retrieval in Ireland.

Donors in Ireland can be living or dead. Usually living donations consist of giving a kidney to a loved one. After someone has died, a person's organs can be donated after brainstem death or circulatory death. Brainstem death is when there is no brain function, with no blood flow or oxygen to the brain. Circulatory death is when the person is injured beyond recovery and will not survive without the support of a ventilator. Two doctors need to verify death via a series of strict tests

There are Specialist Organ Donation Personnel working in hospitals throughout Ireland who provide training, education, support and advice.

=== Organ Donor Card ===
The Irish Kidney Association is known for its Organ Donor Card. It has no legal basis, but can be used to communicate a patient's wishes to their next-of-kin.

== Current law ==
Currently, a person must opt-in to organ donation. Having a medical condition does not necessarily prevent a person from becoming a donor – it is ultimately up to an organ retrieval specialist to assess organ suitability for transplantation.

In Ireland, the heart, lungs, liver, pancreas and kidneys can be donated.

== New proposed legislation ==
In November 2023, the Dáil Éireann (lower house of the Oireachtas, or Irish parliament) passed the Human Tissue (Transplantation, Post-Mortem, Anatomical Examination and Public Display) Bill 2022. This Bill provides "general conditions for the removal, donation and use of organs and tissue from deceased and living persons", including a soft opt-out system of consent for organ donation. Under this system, consent for organ donation will be taken as given unless a person has registered, while alive, their wish to not become an organ donor. The wishes of the deceased will be central to any decision about their organs being donated, however families will still be consulted. At at 6 December 2023, the Bill is before the Seanad Éireann (upper house of the Oireachtas) for consideration.

The new Bill arose from recommendations in a 2005 report from Dr Deirdre Madden on post mortem practices in Irish hospitals (the Madden Report). In 1999, it was revealed that the organs of thousands of children in Ireland were sold to pharmaceutical companies without their families' knowledge or consent. Following this revelation, Micheál Martin, the Minister for Health at the time, set up the Dunne Inquiry to investigate the incidents. In 2004, Mary Harney took over as Minister for Health and appointed Dr Deirdre Madden to produce a report based on the contents of the Dunne Inquiry.

Former Minister for Health, Simon Harris, has said "that the proposed opt-out system would encourage people to discuss their intentions regarding organ donation with their next-of-kin." The bill also aims to ensure that "no hospital post-mortem examination should be carried out, and no tissue retained, for any purpose whatsoever without authorisation".

The "opt-out" approach is currently used in many other countries including Spain and Belgium. In Spain, the system has proved very effective; the organ donation rates are around 35 per million people in 2012, compared to 17 in the UK.

== Statistics ==
In its 2022 Annual Report, Organ Donation and Transplant Ireland (ODTI) reports that, in 2022, Ireland had 86 deceased and 33 living organ donors, leading to 130 kidney, 51 liver, 20 lung, 10 heart and 2 pancreas transplants.

== Whole body donation ==
A person can also donate their whole body to any of five medical schools in Ireland for research purposes. Each university has its own regulations:

- Trinity College Dublin
- University College Dublin
- The Royal College of Surgeons in Ireland, Dublin
- University College Cork
- National University of Ireland, Galway
