= Marian Finucane =

Irish radio presenter and chat show host (1950–2020)

- Born: 21 May 1950; Dublin, Ireland
- Died: 2 January 2020 (aged 69); Naas, County Kildare, Ireland
- Education: Scoil Chaitríona, Dublin; Dublin College of Technology
- Occupation: Broadcaster
- Employer: RTÉ
- Spouse: John Clarke (m. 2015)
- Children: 2

Marian Finucane (/fɪˈnuːkən/ fin-OO-kən; 21 May 1950 – 2 January 2020) was an Irish broadcaster with RTÉ. Finucane began working with the national broadcaster in 1974, starting as a continuity announcer. She went on to host Women Today (1979–1983), the first Irish women's affairs radio programme presented and produced by women, as well as its successor, The Women's Programme (1983–1986); she was the first presenter of Liveline (1985–1999); and she also presented The Marian Finucane Show at weekend lunchtimes on RTÉ Radio 1 until her death.

== Career ==
Marian Finucane was born in Dublin and educated at Scoil Chaitríona, Glasnevin. She studied architecture at Dublin College of Technology in Bolton Street. Finucane practised as an architect until 1974 when she joined RTÉ as a continuity announcer, having been recruited by Eoghan Harris. In 1976 she became a programme presenter, working mainly on programmes concerned with contemporary social issues, especially those concerning women, in particular Women Today.

Finucane in 1979 was the recipient of a Jacobs' Award for Women Today. Her Liveline radio programme was a combined interview and phone-in chat show on weekday afternoons. In 1980 Finucane won the Prix Italia for a documentary on abortion: she interviewed a woman who was about to have an abortion, had travelled with her to England, been with her in the hospital and talked to her afterwards. The Radio Journalist of the Year Award followed in 1988.

Her television work included information programming on RTÉ such as Consumer Choice and the Garda investigation programme Crimeline.

On Gay Byrne's retirement in 1999, Finucane took over his mid-morning radio slot to present The Marian Finucane Show. Another broadcaster, Joe Duffy, took over Liveline. On 24 June 2005, Finucane presented her final Marian Finucane Show in the weekday morning timeslot. Later that afternoon she received an honorary degree from NUI Galway. Apart from recognising her media work, this degree was in recognition of her work raising funds, along with Clarke, towards the building of an AIDS hospice and orphanage in Cape Town, South Africa. In June 2005 she was replaced in her radio timeslot by Ryan Tubridy; in turn she took over morning slots on Saturday and Sunday.

== Personal life and death ==
Finucane grew up in Glasnevin in Dublin. Her father Daniel Finucane was a Garda sergeant, and her mother Maura Finucane was a teacher at Francis Xavier School. Her father died when she was 12.

Her first marriage ended in separation. She then had two children with her partner, John Clarke. Their daughter developed leukaemia and died, aged eight, in 1990. She and Clarke married in January 2015.

Finucane suffered from heart arrhythmia which did not respond to treatment; John Clarke stated after her death that "I believe for two years that she had been very unwell", noting "she wouldn't go to doctors". In one case, Finucane convinced one of her sisters to mimic her symptoms to a doctor in order to obtain a diagnosis.

After a long flight from India where she had attended a friend's wedding, Finucane reported feeling very unwell upon arriving at her home in Kilteel, County Kildare, and decided to go to bed; she died unexpectedly in her sleep from pneumonia on 2 January 2020, aged 69. Her laboured breathing had been noticed in her final broadcast on 8 December 2019. Her funeral took place on 7 January 2020.

In October 2022 a sculpture in her honour was unveiled outside the RTÉ Radio Centre in Dublin.
