= Radio Éireann Players =

Former radio company

The Radio Éireann Players (RÉP) were a repertory company for radio in Ireland, formed in 1947, which performed in regular drama productions for Irish broadcaster, Radio Éireann. After the depredations of the war-time years and a devastating fire in the Abbey Theatre in 1951, the Radio Éireann Players' powerful weekly performances inspired interest in drama throughout the country. Their effect has been compared to an effort at national re-invention, in the same way that the national theatre fifty years earlier had been an attempt to redefine Irish identity.

== History ==
Under Director Dr. T. J. Kiernan (husband of Delia Murphy, appointed 1935), Radio Éireann had already started broadcasting plays from the Abbey and Peacock theatres in Dublin and the Taibhdhearc in Galway. Roibeard Ó Faracháin, a published poet, who set up the RÉP, became the first Radio Éireann Talks Officer in 1939 (his title changed to General Features Officer in 1945). In 1939 the station broadcast over 80 plays. During the Christmas holidays of 1942, Ó Faracháin drew up his plans to ensure the radio drama, as well as other radio activities, should be served by professionals. He also fostered Irish writers such as Kate O'Brien, Edna O'Brien, James Plunkett and Francis MacManus, among many others.

The formation of a full-time theatre company for a radio station was something new — no English-speaking country possessed one. Many questions were asked, including in the Dáil and Department of Finance, before the station won approval to establish the company. Micheál Ó hAodha became the company's first producer and Roibeárd Ó Faracháin with Ria Mooney of the Abbey recruited. All its members were from Ireland, many being native Irish speakers.

== Founding actors ==
The founding actors (plus three who joined the following year) were: Tom Studley, George Greene, Éamonn Kelly, Joe Lynch, Arthur O'Sullivan, Pegg Monahan, Laurence O'Dea, Frank O'Dwyer, Christine Spencer, Ginette Waddell, Marie Mulvey, Gerard Healey, Leo Leyden, Charles McCarthy, Deirdre O'Meara, Una Collins, Seamus Forde, Charles Davis, Ronald Ibbs, Florence Lynch, Mairín Ní Shuilleabháin, Joseph O'Dea, Christopher Casson, John Stephenson and Aiden Grennell. These "temporary, unestablished Civil Servants" started work at the studios on 18 August 1947.

== Dramatists ==
Plays were written by writers such as Michael Farrell, Padraic Fallon, Benedict Kiely, Frank O'Connor and Seán Ó Faoláin. This was a convenient income for these writers during the hard economic times of the 1940s and 1950s and also provided them a large audience. Another contributor was Brendan Behan, who made his debut with two plays for radio. Between plays, the players acted in radio variety programmes and read pieces on the radio as necessary.

== Prix Italia ==
In 1961, the players performed The Weaver's Grave. Adapted and produced by Mícheál Ó hAodha, it was written by Galway author Seamus O'Kelly, and won the coveted Prix Italia for Radio Drama. The cast was: Frank Dwyer (story-teller), Eamon Kelly (nailmaker), Thomas Studley (stone-breaker), Pegg Monahan (weaver's widow), Brendan Cauldwell (grave digger), Henry Comerford (grave digger), Arthur O'Sullivan (cooper), Maura O'Sullivan (weaver's daughter). The players also won this award in 1965 with Dan Treston's "Piano in the River".

== Jacob's Award ==
The players attracted international attention in 1982 when they broadcast an uninterrupted, unabridged, 30-hour dramatised performance of James Joyce's epic novel Ulysses, to commemorate the centenary of the author's birth. The record-breaking marathon broadcast was carried by live relay internationally and won a Jacob's Broadcasting Award, which were instituted in December 1962 as the First Irish Television Awards, in recognition of its achievement.
