= For One Night Only (TV series) =

- Genre: Light entertainment
- Presented by: Gay Byrne
- Country of origin: Ireland
- Original language: English
- No. of series: 2
- No. of episodes: 12 (+3 Christmas specials)

Production
- Production locations: Studio 4, RTÉ Television Centre, Donnybrook, Dublin 4
- Running time: 65 minutes

Original release
- Network: RTÉ One
- Release: 15 July 2011

Related
- The Gay Byrne Music Show (2000)

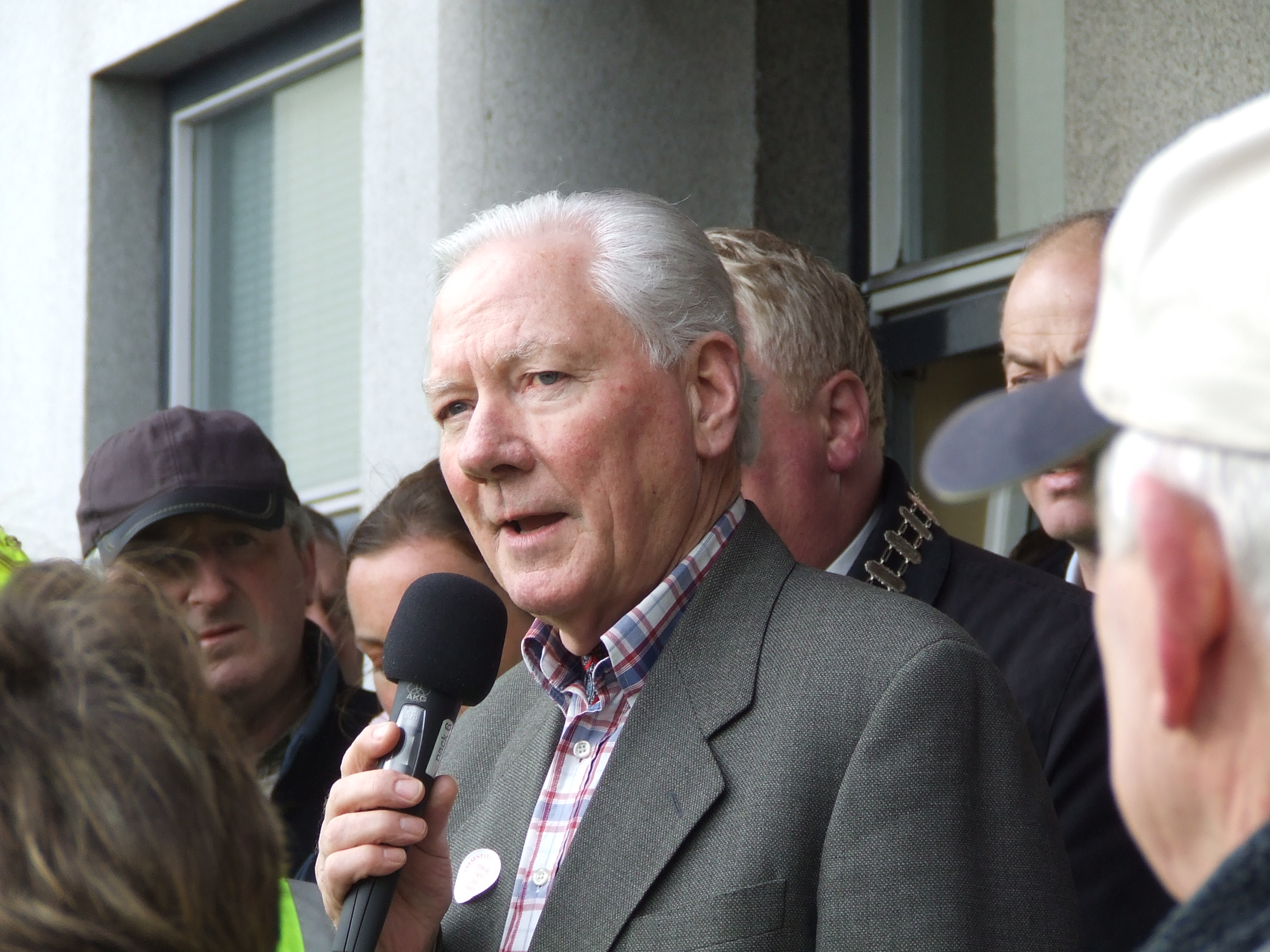
Gay Byrne is presenter

For One Night Only is an Irish light entertainment show hosted by Gay Byrne. It features music and chat with a special guest musician. The studio-based show originally aired on Friday nights as a summer "filler" in 2011. The show returned for a second series in 2012.

== History ==
Following Gay Byrne's retirement as host of The Late Late Show in 1999, he occasionally returned to present other shows. These included, amongst others, The Gay Byrne Music Show, Who Wants to be a Millionaire? and The Meaning of Life. Several of these shows reflected Byrne's own personal interest in a particular subject.

=== Production ===
The first series of For One Night Only was recorded before an audience of 180 in Studio 4 in the RTÉ Television Centre at Donnybrook, Dublin 4. The shows are usually broadcast on Friday nights during July and August, immediately after the RTÉ News: Nine O'Clock at 9:35 p.m.

== Format ==
For One Night Only is described as giving an "intimate and emotional look at the featured artist's life story." The show offers a This Is Your Life-style interview with a special guest musician and is punctuated by performances by that musician.

== Christmas special ==
A special Christmas edition was broadcast on 25 December 2011 as a tribute to The Dubliners 50th anniversary. The show featured Declan O'Rourke, Sharon Shannon, Shane MacGowan, Mary Coughlan and Liam Ó Maonlaí.

== Broadcast dates ==
=== Series 1 ===
Show	Guest	Broadcast date	Recording date
1	Imelda May	15 July 2011	16 June 2011
2	Bob Geldof	22 July 2011	29 June 2011
3	Christy Moore	29 July 2011	9 June 2011
4	Daniel O'Donnell	5 August 2011	15 June 2011
5	Mary Black	12 August 2011	7 June 2011
6	Paul Brady	19 August 2011	30 June 2011

=== Special ===
Show	Guest	Broadcast date	Title
7	The Dubliners	25 December 2011	Christmas special

=== Series 2 ===
Show	Guest	Broadcast date	Recording date
8	Sinéad O'Connor	3 August 2012	15 June 2012
9	The Saw Doctors	10 August 2012	8 June 2012
10	Finbar Furey	17 August 2012	7 June 2012
11	Aslan	24 August 2012	13 June 2012
12	Dickie Rock	1 September 2012	14 June 2012

=== Specials ===
Show	Guest	Broadcast date	Recording date
13	Sharon Shannon	24 December 2012	5 June 2012
14	Boyzone	24 August 2013	13 June 2013
15	Phil Coulter	24 December 2013	11 June 2013
