= Kaegi =

Kaegi or Kägi is a surname. Notable people with the surname include:

- Adriana Kaegi (born 1957), Swiss entertainer
- Dieter Kaegi (born 1957), Swiss opera director
- Fritz Kaegi (born 1971), American politician
- Gottfried Kägi (1911–?), Swiss skeleton racer
- Walter Kaegi (1937–2022), American historian
- Werner Kaegi (1901–1979), Swiss historian
- Werner Kaegi (composer) (1926–2024), Swiss electronic music composer, musicologist and educator

== See also ==
- Kägi Söhne, Swiss biscuit and chocolate company
