= The Irish Tenors =

Irish singing trio

- Genres: Traditional pop
- Instrument: Vocals
- Years active: 1998–present
- Label: PBS
- Members: Anthony Kearns; Ronan Tynan; Patrick Hyland
- Past members: John McDermott; Finbar Wright; Karl Scully Declan Kelly
- Website: theirishtenorsmusic.com

The Irish Tenors are a singing trio from Ireland that was started in 1998 by a group of television producers for a PBS special The Irish Tenors. They have since recorded five PBS specials and eight albums. The group's members are Anthony Kearns, Ronan Tynan and Patrick Hyland.

== History ==
Daniel Harte and Bill Hughes formed the idea of a trio of Irish tenors during the Cannes film festival. Harte and Hughes wanted to produce a television special and first approached Ireland's Finbar Wright (one of Ireland's leading romantic tenors) in 1998 to join the group, but Wright's recording contract with Sony BMG prohibited such a venture. Then they invited Canadian balladeer John McDermott to head up the group and he accepted. After conferring with Ireland's leading vocal coach, Dr. Veronica Dunne, classically trained singers Anthony Kearns and Ronan Tynan were asked to join. In 1999, The Irish Tenors: Live in Dublin debuted on PBS television in the United States.

PBS signed up for another special by the increasingly popular new group, but early in 2000 McDermott's mother died and he decided he could not fully commit himself to the group. Days before PBS was to film The Irish Tenors – Live in Belfast, Daniel Harte and Hughes again contacted Finbar Wright and asked him to step in. Wright agreed to help and was asked to stay on for upcoming tour dates. Having left Sony, Wright was able to join the trio on a permanent basis. In 2001, the Irish Tenors filmed their third special, an historic PBS broadcast at New York's Ellis Island, hosted by Irish-American actor Martin Sheen. Their album Ellis Island topped Billboard's Heatseeker list and landed on its "Top 10 Best of 2001."

The 2005 album Sacred features Kearns, Wright, and McDermott who rejoined the group temporarily after Ronan Tynan left to pursue a full-time solo career. In 2006, Karl Scully joined the group, replacing McDermott and Tynan. The increasingly successful blend of voices presented a nine-part television series for Ireland's RTÉ entitled The Irish Tenors & Friends. Friends performing on the television special with The Irish Tenors included Lord Andrew Lloyd Webber, Paul Carrick, Finbar Furey, Hayley Westenra, Shayne Ward, Sharon Shannon, Peter Grant, Rebecca Storm, Lucia Evans, and Celine Byrne. In 2007, the South Carolina Legislature issued a "Proclamation" welcoming the trio to that State at their performance in Charleston.

Scully remained a member of the trio until Tynan's return in 2012. The current trio comprises Kearns, Tynan and Hyland, who continue to tour twice annually, typically around St. Patrick's Day and around the Christmas holidays.

== Discography ==
- The Irish Tenors – Live in Dublin (1999)
- Home for Christmas (1999)
- Live In Belfast (2000)
- Ellis Island (2001)
- Best of The Irish Tenors (2002)
- We Three Kings (2003)
- Heritage (2004)
- Sacred (2005)
- Christmas (2009)
- Ireland (2010)
- 25th Anniversary Tour CD (2023)

== Filmography ==
- Live in Dublin (1999)
- Live in Belfast (2000)
- Ellis Island (2001)
- In Concert with the Chicagoland Pops Orchestra (2004)
- The Irish Tenors & Friends (2006)
