= Anthony Kearns =

Irish tenor & music producer (born 1971)

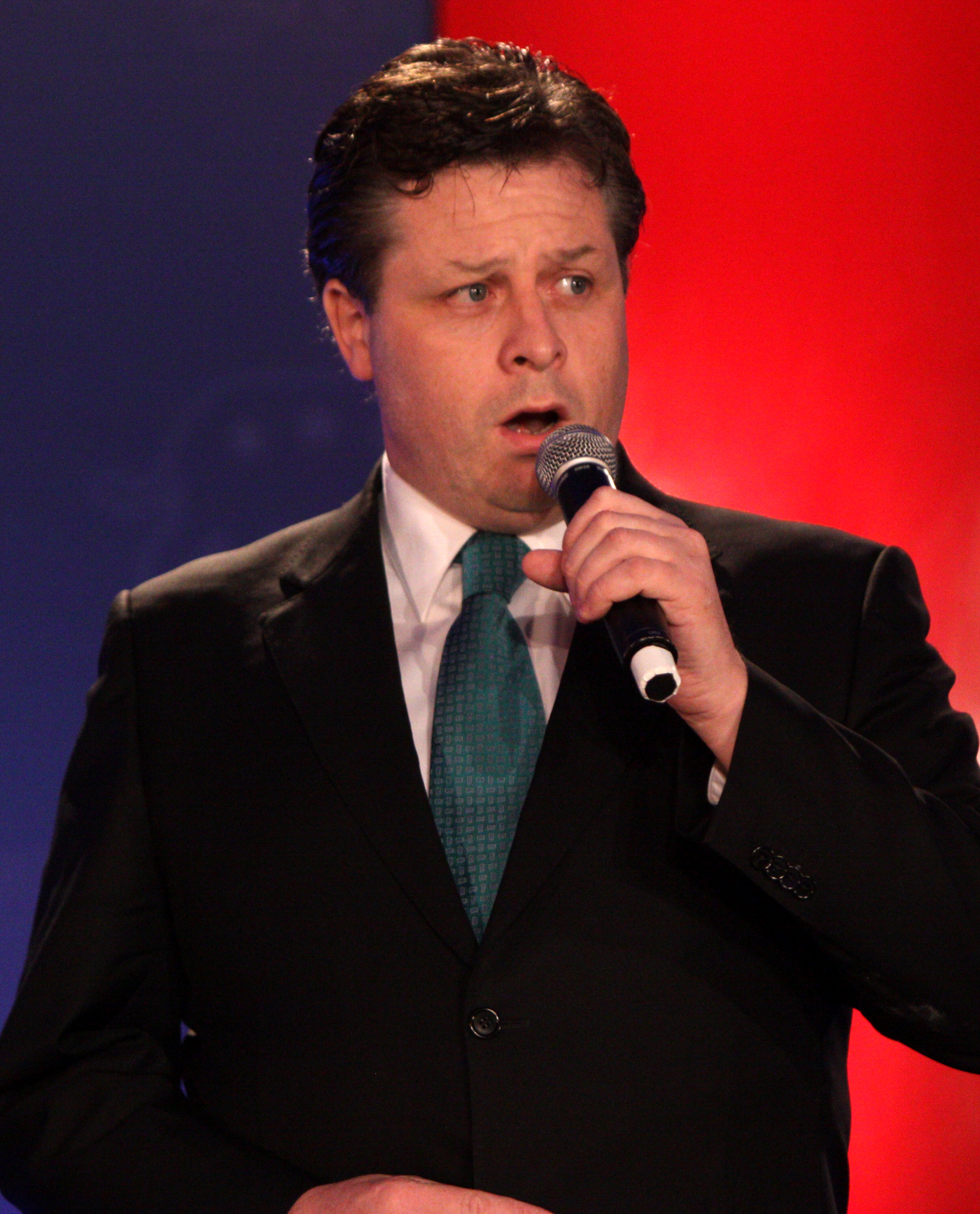
- Kearns performing in June 2011.

Background information
- Born: Anthony Joseph Kearns; 17 August 1971 (age 55)
- Origin: Kiltealy, County Wexford, Ireland
- Genres: Opera, Irish, Classical
- Occupations: Singer, performer
- Years active: 1998–present

Anthony Kearns (born 17 August 1971, in Kiltealy, County Wexford, Ireland) is an internationally acclaimed tenor, record producer, and a member of The Irish Tenors.

== Early life ==
Anthony Kearns is one of six children in a musical family; as a result, his interest in music came at a very early age. Kearns began singing traditional Irish songs with his family and won many singing competitions in his youth, generally in the sean-nós tradition. He played the button (double row black dot) accordion and various other instruments common in Traditional music. He attended F.C.J. Secondary School Bunclody, singing at Mass and school shows. After leaving school, Kearns studied catering and hotel management, while singing in local musical productions and placing in various singing competitions around the country.

Kearns achieved success in 1993 after entering a national radio competition, "Ireland's Search for a Tenor" on the Gay Byrne program, a competition to celebrate the issuing of a new ten pound note (called a "tenner".) The only competitor with no formal training, Kearns won the competition at the finals, held on a city street in Dublin, singing "The Impossible Dream" and "Danny Boy". One of his prizes was an appearance on Gay Byrne's Late Late Show on RTÉ television. After winning the competition, he began training with the renowned Irish opera singer and vocal coach, Veronica Dunne, who had been a judge for the competition. Kearns then began pursuing a full-time career in music. After three years at the Leinster School of Music with Dr. Dunne, he studied at the College of Music in Cardiff [Wales].

== Career ==
=== 1998: The Irish Tenors ===
Kearns' career took a leap in 1998 when Irish producer Bill Hughes and PBS joined forces to begin The Irish Tenors. Kearns, an original member of The Irish Tenors, collaborated with tenors Ronan Tynan, John McDermott, and Finbar Wright to net Gold, Platinum, and Double Platinum CD recognitions. Their first PBS Special before a live U.S. audience, "Live from Ellis Island," was a tribute to U.S. immigrants. The Irish Tenors are among the top three highest-grossing acts for PBS, raising over $10 million over the course of their collaboration. They continue to tour and produce CDs—and are considered to be one of the most successful singing groups from Ireland in history.

In 2006, the trio starred in a nine-part television series, Irish Tenors & Friends, on RTÉ TV. Special guests included Lord Andrew Lloyd Webber, Paul Carrick, Finbar Furey, Shayne Ward, Sharon Shannon, Peter Grant, and others.

=== 2006–2012: Broadway and television performances ===
Kearns teamed up with Bill Hughes again for a PBS project called Hallelujah Broadway, filmed in Prague in February 2010. Hallelujah Broadway has since been broadcast on Irish and U.S. television stations, and Hallelujah Broadway concerts have been presented in various cities in the U.S. as well.

Kearns made his debut appearance on the Fox News Network as a solo artist on Huckabee on 24 April 2010, where he shared his "deep passion for music" with former Gov. Mike Huckabee, the program's host. The interview included Kearns' insights about his meteoric career and rise to fame, and a performance by Kearns of "Danny Boy", and "The Lord's Prayer".

Said Huckabee after the interview, "When [Anthony] sang 'Danny Boy' and 'The Lord's Prayer' on my show, he had one of the most positive responses of any guest I've had to date." Kearns returned to the show in 2011 to sing "Ave Maria" which he dedicated to U.S. troops.

Kearns performed with the Air Force Band at a special Veteran's Day 2012 broadcast "America's Veterans: A Musical Tribute", on Maryland Public Television (a PBS affiliate).

=== 2012–2014: Performances for world leaders ===
Kearns performed at a pre-inaugural brunch, as a guest of the Chairman of the Joint Chiefs of Staff, General Martin Dempsey, in tribute to the Congressional Medal of Honor Society on 20 January 2013. Kearns also sang as the guest of Governor Martin O'Malley at the Maryland Democratic Party's Inaugural Ball to celebrate the Inauguration of U.S. President Barack Obama's second term in office. In March 2012, Kearns sang at a benefit honoring Gov. O'Malley and another prominent Irish-American, Governor Bob McDonnell of Virginia. Kearns sang at Gov. McDonnell's Inaugural Gala in 2010 and his bipartisan Prayer Breakfast (with outgoing Governor Tim Kaine) the next day in Richmond, VA. On 19 March 2013, Kearns performed at the 2013 Friends of Ireland Luncheon at the U.S. Capitol as the guest of Speaker of the House John Boehner. Special guests included President Barack Obama and Taoiseach (Prime Minister of Ireland) Enda Kenny, Members of Congress, and foreign dignitaries from Ireland and the United Kingdom.

On 27 May 2013, Kearns opened the 2013 National Memorial Day Parade Program in Washington, D.C., with a stirring rendition of "America, the Beautiful," with a 260-member chorus from across the country in front of an estimated crowd of 300,000 people to mark the anniversaries of World War II (70th), the Korean War (60th), and the Vietnam War (50th). On 18 June 2013, Kearns performed at the official U.S. ceremony commemorating the 50th Anniversary of President John F. Kennedy's visit to Ireland on Arlington National Cemetery. This was the first time part of the Eternal Flame was allowed to be taken from the grave site.

Kearns appeared on Huckabee to kick off the Christmas season on 1 December 2013, singing "Hark! The Herald Angels Sing." That same week, Kearns headlined the 94th Annual Thanksgiving Day Parade (the oldest in the nation) in Philadelphia, PA singing "We Three Kings" before approximately one million parade-goers and 12 million TV viewers.

On 14 March 2014, Kearns headlined the 113th Annual St. Patrick's Day Banquet hosted by the Irish Fellowship Club of Chicago. Special guests included Illinois Governor Pat Quinn, Chicago Mayor Rahm Emanuel, John McDonough, President and CEO of the Chicago Blackhawks, and others.

=== 2014: National Memorial Day Concert and 9/11 Tribute ===
In early May 2014, it was announced that Kearns would join a distinguished line-up as a soloist in the 2014 Memorial Day Concert on PBS—a national tradition over the past 25 years. Co-hosted by Tony Award-winner Joe Mantegna and Emmy Award-winner Gary Sinise, the concert is a tribute to America's men and women in uniform, their families, and all those who have given their lives for our country. The event was broadcast live to 10 million viewers nationwide from the West Lawn of the U.S. Capitol on Sun., 25 May 2014. Before the concert, Jerry Colbert, executive producer and founder of Capital Concerts, said of Kearns, "We're pleased to have Anthony Kearns lend his powerful voice for what will be a historic and inspiring tribute to America's service men and women, their families, and all those who have made the ultimate sacrifice for our country."

On 12 June 2014, Kearns sang "God Bless America" during the 239th United States Army Birthday Gala held at the historic Union League Club in New York City. The event was emceed by Greg Kelly, co-host of Good Day New York (Fox 5 NY) and a former co-host of Fox and Friends, and featured General Raymond Odierno, U.S. Army Chief of Staff, as the Special Military Guest of Honor.

On 9 September 2014, Kearns headlined the National 11 September Memorial & Museum in New York City—marking the first time that the museum was open to the public. Kearns sang "Isle of Hope, Isle of Tears," by songwriter Brendan Graham which he and The Irish Tenors recorded in 2001 on Ellis Island. The song became a huge hit for Kearns and his Irish Tenor colleagues. Kearns sang before an audience of 1,200 including former New York Mayor Michael Bloomberg, who hosted the event as chairman. The event paid homage to those who died in the attacks, the heroes, and survivors. It also commemorated the rebuilding and resilience of New York and its bond with the American people. Other event participants included singer Ricky Martin, sex therapist, talk show host, and author Dr. Ruth Westheimer, and former NBA player Dikembe Mutombo.

In 2014, Kearns became an International National Ambassador for Wells of Life, a 501(c)(3) nonprofit founded in 2008 to provide Ugandan communities with access to clean and safe drinking water by drilling water wells. Kearns headlined the 2014 Wells of Life Annual Gala and recorded two Public Service Announcements in support of the organization. Kearns recently announced that he would donate a well honoring those who lost their lives on 11 September 2001. The "Anthony Kearns 9/11 Memorial Well" became operational in March 2015.

Kearns highlighted his work for Wells of Life and his 9/11 Memorial Well in several media interviews, including with NPR-affiliate WHYY Philadelphia.

=== 2015: Performances in U.S. and Europe, including for Pope Francis ===
Kearns had several high-profile concerts and engagements in Europe and the U.S. in 2015, including singing the tenor role in "The Irish Ring Concert"—a trilogy of Irish operas that includes Maritana, The Bohemian Girl and The Lily of Killarney—at Ireland's National Concert Hall.

In February 2015, Kearns headlined the "Second Annual Musical Celebration of the Irish Season and Military Tribute" at Salamander Resort & Spa in Middleburg, VA. The gala was co-chaired by former Virginia First Lady Susan Allen and Martha-Ann Alito, both daughters of U.S. military fathers, with the support of Kirsten Fedewa & Associates, L.L.C. Larry Michael, ten-time Emmy winner and "Voice of the Washington Redskins" on NBC4, served as the evening's Master of Ceremonies. The event supported local charities, Our Military Kids and Final Salute, Inc. Other special guests included Supreme Court Justice Samuel Alito; former Governor of Virginia George Allen; Congresswoman Barbara Comstock; VADM Tony Less USN (Ret.), first official squadron commander of the legendary Blue Angels; Colonel James B. Hickey (U.S. Army, Ret.), Senior Military Advisor to Senator John McCain; Shannon Bream, Fox News' Supreme Court reporter and anchor of America's News Headquarters; Virginia State Delegate Tom Russ; and Bruce Allen, president of The Washington Redskins.

On 16 March 2015, Kearns sang at the American Ireland Fund's 23rd National Gala held at the National Building Museum in Washington, D.C. The event honored Thomas J. Donohue, President & Chief Executive Officer of the United States Chamber of Commerce, Senator Richard Durbin, and Congressman Thomas J. Rooney. Other guests in attendance included Honorary Chairs Irish Ambassador to the United States, Anne Anderson; U.S. Ambassador to Ireland, Kevin O'Malley; British Ambassador to the United States, Sir Peter Westmacott; Senators Patrick Leahy and Patrick Toomey; and Congressmen Peter King and Richard Neal. The evening's keynote speaker was the Taoiseach Enda Kenny, TD, Prime Minister of Ireland and the gala's Honorary Patron.

In May, he also performed at a Memorial Day Tribute to Veterans and Veterans Serving in Congress with special guest Brigadier General Steve Ritchie, USAF, Ret., who is the only Air Force Pilot Ace since the Korean War.

Kearns, a sports fan, also sang "The Star-Spangled Banner" at Citi Field in August 2015 before the New York Mets game versus the Boston Red Sox. Previously, Kearns sang during the "Notre Dame: A Welcome Home Celebration" vs Navy Football game in Dublin, Ireland in 2012. He also sang during the Military Tribute at the 137th Preakness, and he performed "The Star Spangled Banner" as the guest of The Washington Redskins when they played against the Atlanta Falcons at FedExField in Landover, MD in October 2012. Most recently, Kearns performing "God Bless America" on Jim McKay Maryland Million Day on Saturday, 17 October 2015 at Laurel Park.

During Pope Francis' first historic visit to the United States in September 2015, Kearns was the final performer during the pre-Mass concert at the World Meeting of Families in Philadelphia, PA. Said Kearns during a CNN interview with Don Lemon before the performance, "I feel very privileged to be a part of such an historic event in honor of His Holiness' visit to the United States. It will be an unforgettable experience." Kearns was accompanied by David George of Louisville, Kentucky. Said Kirsten Fedewa, Kearns' public relations consultant, "This is an exceptional honor for Mr. Kearns, and an once-in-a-lifetime opportunity to share his inspiring voice with those convening in Philadelphia and around the world."

In September 2015, Kearns sang a 9/11 Tribute at a benefit hosted by Tobias Harris of the Orlando Magic, in memory of the 9/11 victims and American military forces who defend liberty around the world.

=== 2016: Ireland 100 at The Kennedy Center and other engagements ===
Kearns began 2016 with a performance at the launch of the commemorations of the 100th anniversary of the 1916 Easter Rising by members of the Irish and American governments in New York City. This was one of more than two hundred cultural events taking place across the United States through 2016 and many others worldwide. Participants at the launch included Minister for Foreign Affairs of Ireland Charlie Flanagan, Irish Ambassador to the U.S. Anne Anderson, Irish Consul General Barbara Jones and New York Senator Chuck Schumer, actor Liam Neeson, and others. The launch took place at the Irish Consulate in New York on the morning of 7 January, followed by the evening reception at the historic Pier A Harbor House in Battery Park, New York.

Kearns was the featured performer during a special military tribute at the 141st Preakness Stakes on 21 May 2016. Kearns sang "America the Beautiful". The tribute is a part of the Preakness' celebration of Armed Forces Day which honors Americans serving in the five U.S. military

On 23 May 2016, Kearns performed as part of the John F. Kennedy Center for the Performing Arts' 2016 major curated festival, "IRELAND 100: Celebrating a Century of Irish Arts & Culture." Kearns also performed in a solo appearance during Opening Night of "IRELAND 100: Celebrating a Century of Irish Arts & Culture" on 17 May 2016, an event directed and hosted by Olivier Award-winning actress Fiona Shaw with the National Symphony Orchestra, under the baton of Irish conductor David Brophy. The event included remarks by Taoiseach Enda Kenny and Vice President Joseph Biden.

Kearns opened the 2016 National Memorial Day Parade Program in Washington, D.C.—the nation's largest—on 30 May 2016. He performed "America the Beautiful" with a 250-member chorus at the top of the televised program. This year's theme was "Saluting our Fallen Heroes from the American Revolution through Iraq and Afghanistan." Highlights included a tribute to the World War II generation, remembering the Gulf War, and honoring the fallen of 11 September 2001.

Kearns performed at the Fifth Annual Memorial Day Kick-off and Tribute to Veterans on 24 May 2016 in Washington, D.C. The event drew a crowd of 150 guests, including bipartisan Members of Congress, senior military members, embassy officials, senior staff and media. Special guests included Master of Ceremonies Daniel Lippman of Politico, retired USMC Captain Jason Haag of the American Humane Association, and World War II veteran Arnold Taylor. Colonel James Tierney (U.S. Army-retired) of the famed 69th Infantry Regiment of New York was also recognized and offered a hallowed toast to our men and women in uniform. Kearns sang several patriotic and classic songs to conclude the program.

Tenor Anthony Kearns headlined the spectacular Anam Cara Awards Gala at the Irish Cultural Center and McClelland Library in Phoenix, AZ on Saturday, 15 October.

Kearns was the featured performer during a special Military Tribute at the 141st Preakness Stakes on 21 May 2016. Kearns sang "America the Beautiful." The Military Tribute is a part of the Preakness' celebration of Armed Forces Day which honors Americans serving in the five U.S. military.

In the fall, Kearns made a return performance at the annual Maryland Million Gala and Auction in October 2016. In addition to the gala and auction, Kearns also performed at Laurel Park Racecourse during the Maryland Million Day races on 22 October. This was the second consecutive year that Kearns performed at the highly anticipated event celebrating the 31st running of Jim McKay Maryland Million Day – and he has become a favorite among the Thoroughbred Racing crowd.

In November 2016, Kearns joined a star-studded musical cast in "America Salutes You", a multi-platform broadcast celebrating active duty military, veterans, and veterans' causes. The program aired nationally on Thanksgiving Day weekend in 2016. In addition to Mr. Kearns, concert performers include pop legend Cyndi Lauper, multi -platinum selling singer/songwriter Gavin DeGraw, country music legend Wanda Jackson, rapper Hoodie Allen, Gospel Grammy winner CeCe Winans, and bluegrass legend Ricky Skaggs.

=== 2017–2018: Lismore Opera Festival, Miller Presidential Center, and U.S. Capitol performance ===
Kearns continues to lend his voice to some occasions, including a special holiday concert at the nonpartisan Miller Center for Public Affairs at the University of Virginia and the Friends of Ireland luncheon hosted by House Speaker Paul Ryan (R-WI) on Thursday, 15 March 2018, at the United States Capitol. As announced by the Speaker's office, "President Donald Trump and Prime Minister (Taoiseach) of Ireland Leo Varadkar are scheduled to participate as an ode to St. Patrick's Day and strong U.S.-Ireland ties. This is the third year that Speaker Ryan will host this event." The annual event is a time-honored tradition started in 1983 by House Speaker Tip O'Neill and President Ronald Reagan, who rose above politics to unite in their shared heritage and desire for peace. "It is indeed a privilege to accept the invitation of Speaker Ryan to sing for the Friends of Ireland Luncheon which highlights the shared history and enduring affection between Ireland and America," said Mr. Kearns. "I hope to express that closeness through my music on this special occasion."

Kearns' received several standing ovations for his performance, which included "O, America!," for the distinguished delegation, which also included Vice President Mike Pence, Irish Ambassador Daniel Mulhall, Cabinet members, and 100 bipartisan members of Congress. He received favorable coverage in "Hollywood on the Potomac" and other media outlets.

On 3 March 2019, Kearns kicked off the spring social season with a performance at a concert event hosted by the ambassadors of Malta, Slovenia, and the Czech Republic at the Perry Belmont House in the heart of Washington, D.C. The soiree was co-emceed by Emmy-award-winning storyteller and former Fox5 anchor Will Thomas and internationally acclaimed interior designer Barry Dixon, and was featured in publications such as The Georgetowner, Washington Diplomat magazine, The Washington Examiner, and more.

== Professional recognition ==
Kearns was recognized in 2010 by the Irish Music Association as the "Best Irish Tenor in the US, UK, and European Union." Recently Kearns was invited to become the Honorary President of Lanza Legend, a website dedicated to honoring the great tenor Mario Lanza, one of the most influential tenors of the 20th century. In that capacity, Kearns was asked by journalist Lindsay Perigo to write the foreword to his new book, "The One Tenor: A Salute to Mario Lanza," published in August 2013.

== Operatic roles ==
Kearns' opera reviews are listed at this footnote: His credits include: Fenton in an Italian production of Falstaff. In Irish productions, he sang Rinuccio in Gianni Schicchi and the title role in Faust for Opera Ireland, Carmen's Don José for Ireland's Glasthule Opera, Don Ottavio in a Lismore Music Festival production of Don Giovanni, and he sang with the Royal Dublin Society as the lead tenor in the first complete performance since the early 20th century of The Lily of Killarney (part of "The Irish Ring" trilogy).

In 2017, Kearns returned to the Lismore Opera Festival in the leading tenor role of Nemorino in Gaetano Donizetti's L'elisir d'amore, at the Lismore Castle Gardens in Lismore, Ireland. It was his third appearance with the Lismore Opera Festival—Ireland's only summer opera festival set in the stunning Lismore Castle and Gardens, in St. Carthage's Cathedral, and in the beautiful and historic great homes along the Blackwater River.

In the U.S., Kearns has performed the roles of Romeo in Romeo & Juliet: Then and Now, Edgardo in Lucia di Lammermoor; and reprised his role as Faust for Opera Naples, Florida. He also sang Alfred in Die Fledermaus for the Emerald City Opera Company in Steamboat Springs, Colorado.

== Charitable causes ==
Kearns sings for many causes world-wide. This includes benefit concerts for autism awareness, and benefits to honor and assist U.S. military troops, veterans, and their families, such as the USO's Operation Enduring Care, the Vietnam Veterans Memorial Fund, Stand Up for Heroes, the Elizabeth Dole Foundation, the World War II Memorial, Saratoga WarHorse, Boulder Crest Retreat for Military and Veteran Wellness, Coalition to Salute America's Heroes, American Humane, Leave No One Behind, and Thanks USA.

== With A Song in My Heart ==
In May 2013, Kearns announced his plan to release his solo album, With a Song in My Heart, on the National Defense Radio Show. The CD features 13 tracks of many genres, including the title song from Rodgers and Hart's musical, "Spring is Here" and other beloved standards such as "La Donne e Mobile," "Ave Maria," and "Granada;" "Salut Demeure Chaste et Pure," an aria from the opera, Faust (which Kearns has starred in); the American folk favorite, "Shenandoah," Broadway tunes ("Younger than Springtime" from Rodgers and Hammerstein), and a few Irish tunes – such as the famed ballads, "Boolavogue" and "Danny Boy," and more. The album was released in fall 2013. The album was arranged and orchestrated by Gavin Murphy and Eric Stern, with sound engineer Jonathan Allen of Abbey Road Studios. Musical accompaniment was provided by long-time accompanist Patrick Healy on piano and the Slovak Symphony Orchestra conducted by Allan Wilson.

In November 2014, it was announced that Kearns' debut solo album, With a Song in My Heart, had been submitted for consideration for a 57th Annual GRAMMY Award nomination in four categories – including "Best Classical Solo Vocal Album." The news was released by Kearns' agent and publicist Kirsten Fedewa.
