= Finbar Wright =

- Finbar Wright, NYC 2006

Background information
- Born: Edward Finbar Wright; 26 September 1957 (age 69)
- Origin: Kinsale, County Cork, Ireland
- Genres: Pop, Jazz, Spanish
- Occupations: Singer, songwriter, musician, poet
- Years active: 1990–present
- Labels: Sony BMG, Ritz, Dara
- Formerly of: The Irish Tenors
- Website: FinbarWright.com

Edward Finbar Wright (born 26 September 1957), known popularly as Finbar Wright, is an Irish singer, songwriter, and poet from County Cork, Ireland.

Wright is a classically trained tenor who emerged during the 1990s in Ireland and has become one of that country's "most popular singers", concentrating on romantic, jazz and pop standards for the adult contemporary audience. Referred to as one of Ireland's great romantic singers, his first album, Because in 1991 reached the top of the Irish music charts. Wright's second recording, Whatever You Believe, also reached the top of the Irish charts with triple platinum certification and produced the number 1 hit single, "Whatever You Believe", now a Christmas favourite in Ireland. His subsequent recordings have also received gold and/or platinum status.

The two-time IRMA "Male Entertainer of the Year" is best known outside of Europe as one of the Irish Tenors from their PBS specials and recordings.

== Early life ==
Born in Kinsale, County Cork, Ireland in 1957, Finbar Wright was the youngest of eight children in a Roman Catholic farming household. Finbar's paternal grandfather, whose family tree includes 7th President of the United States Andrew Jackson, was the son of a Presbyterian farmer living in County Monaghan where he met his future bride, a Catholic from County Cork. The couple married and moved to Cork to begin a family. Grandfather Wright started up his own hackney service which became the family business until one son, Robert, decided to go into farming. Robert later met and married Julia O'Donovan and together raised their eight children on their Ballinspittle farm. Three years after the arrival of their seventh child, Julia gave birth to Finbar on 26 September, one day after the feast-day of Saint Finbarr, the Patron Saint of Cork.

Robert and Julia both enjoyed singing and, subsequently, made it a priority that all eight of the Wright children were taught an appreciation for music, in one form or another. At age 6 young Finbar began studying piano with Ms. Maura Hourihane and singing on local stages with one of his four brothers. At age 11 Finbar, having shown a keen interest and, more importantly, an ability for athletics, was sent to Farranferris College, a diocesan preparatory school known for its hurling tradition. While there, Wright impressed academically as well, and at 16 was sent to university in Palencia, Spain to study for the priesthood.

While studying in Spain, Finbar developed his lasting appreciation and love for Spanish culture and music. He returned to Ireland to take a Bachelor of Divinity Degree at National University of Ireland Maynooth, in County Kildare, where he joined the choir and became senior cantor in charge of liturgical singing. In 1978 Wright, at age 21, was ordained to the Catholic priesthood below the canonical age of 24, a distinction which required special dispensation by the Pope.

1979 saw the historic first visit by a Pontiff to the island nation of Ireland. On 29 September 1979 in Phoenix Park, Dublin, John Paul II celebrated an open-air Papal Mass to an assembled congregation of 1.25 million, at that time roughly one-third of the population of Ireland. Wright was appointed deacon for that Mass and, beneath the commemorative 100 ft (30 m) steel cross, read the Gospel (and sang the Responsories) to the largest gathering of Irish people ever recorded in one place.

As a priest, Fr. Finbar returned to Farranferris College to teach Spanish and Latin. In 1987, following the deaths of his eldest brother and his father, and citing philosophical differences with the Church, Wright, at age 30, made the decision to leave the priesthood and was laicised.

== Career ==
Wright has performed in many of the major concert halls around the world including Carnegie Hall, Sydney Opera House, Radio City Music Hall, Lincoln Center, Royal Albert Hall, Dublin's National Concert Hall and the Hollywood Bowl. He began his formal training at 27 and his professional music career at 32: "Even when I went back to Farranferris as a teacher, I stayed interested in singing...".

Formal vocal studies began in 1984 as Wright attended the Cork School of Music, where he studied music theory with George Dunne, singing with Robert Beare and piano with Angel Climent. He subsequently studied with Ernst Haefliger in Munich, Germany, and with the Romanian soprano Ileana Cotrubaș at Aldeburgh, England. He was chosen to study with Dr. Veronica Dunne, regarded as Ireland's pre-eminent vocal teacher.

In 1987, Wright made his television singing debut on RTÉ's The Late Late Show, hosted by Gay Byrne. He entered the Feis Ceoil competitions in Dublin, winning its major singing awards and, in 1989, he was chosen as Ireland's representative to the BBC Cardiff Singer of the World competition.

In 1990, Wright began his professional music career in earnest, with recitals and concerts around Ireland. By 1991, he was starring in his own video for the United States Public Broadcasting System: Finbar Wright in Concert. His first album, Because (1991), was produced by Phil Coulter and reached the top of the Irish music charts and platinum status. Later that year, Coulter invited Wright to accompany him on a world tour. As his popularity grew, RTÉ invited him to co-host the television series Music of the Night with singer/actress Angeline Ball. Wright's second album, Whatever You Believe went triple platinum in Ireland and made the Mike Batt title song "Whatever You Believe" a Christmas classic in that country. All of Wright's recordings have reached gold and/or platinum status.

Wright was nominated for, and won, the Irish Recorded Music Association's "Male Entertainer of the Year" for two consecutive years, in 1992 and 1993. He has performed with Phil Coulter, Kiri Te Kanawa, Jerry Lee Lewis and Lord Andrew Lloyd Webber. In 1993, Montserrat Caballé invited Wright as special guest artist at her concert in Dublin, after hearing him sing a Spanish song on one of his albums. He is fluent in Irish, English, Spanish, Italian, French and Latin, and his concerts and recordings include songs in most of these languages. The single "South of the Border" (written by Jimmy Kennedy), with its syncopated rhythms and Spanish flair, is a favourite Wright song with American audiences.

In 1995, Wright performed at the State Dinner in Dublin Castle in honour of US President Bill Clinton. He was invited to sing again for President Clinton in Washington, DC. In 1999, Daniel O'Donnell asked Wright to join him at the London Royal Albert Hall for a concert, prompting him to state: "Daniel and I are going to be like the new Irish rat pack". On his 50th birthday (4 October 2007) at the National Concert Hall in Dublin, Wright was presented with a five-foot cake and a leather-bound book of well wishes from former President Bill and Hillary Clinton, and old friends Daniel O'Donnell and Phil Coulter, among others.

Wright has guested on most of Ireland's national television programs, including many appearances on RTÉ's The Late Late Show and UTV's Gerry Kelly show, TV3's Ireland AM, RTÉ's The Afternoon Show and the comedy hit Podge and Rodge. He has guested with the Irish Tenors on all the major network morning shows in the United States, NBC's Today Show, ABC's Good Morning America, CBS' the Early Show as well as Live with Regis and Kelly and several appearances on the home shopping network QVC.

Wright's musical influences include Count John McCormack, Mario Lanza, Ray Charles, Willie Nelson, Freddie Mercury and Queen. Still deeply spiritual, Wright includes at least one piece of sacred music in every concert and on every album. Each of his recordings reflect these influences as he embraces all genres of music, such as popular, jazz, traditional Irish, rock-classics, Spanish rhythms, Neapolitan romance, old standards and light classical.

Finbar Wright in the Irish Tenors

== The Irish Tenors ==
The first to be asked by producer Bill Hughes to join a new group called The Irish Tenors in 1998, Wright had to decline under the terms of his contract with Sony BMG Music. In 2000, having left Sony, he was asked to step in at the last minute to replace John McDermott, who had decided to leave the group, for the Live from Belfast PBS special. Since then, Wright has recorded six albums and five PBS specials with the Irish Tenors.

In 2001, they filmed a historic PBS special at New York's Ellis Island, hosted by Irish/American actor Martin Sheen. Their album Ellis Island topped Billboard's Heatseeker list and landed on its "Top 10 Best of 2001". In 2003, the Irish Tenors participated in the UNICEF Snowflake Lighting celebrations to kick off the festive season in New York, sharing the stage with the mayor of New York, Michael Bloomberg, and movie star Liv Tyler, who hosted the event.

In 2004, Wright and Irish Tenors' friend Anthony Kearns were asked by ABC's Good Morning America to sing the hymn "Amazing Grace" for their coverage of the funeral of former US President Ronald Reagan. In 2006, the trio hosted the nine-part Summer variety series for RTÉ produced by Bill Hughes' Mind the Gap productions, The Irish Tenors, Heroes & Friends, which included Andrew Lloyd Webber, Finbar Furey, Hayley Westenra, Sharon Shannon, Rebecca Storm and Shane Ward, among others. In 2006, the Irish Tenors welcomed newcomer Karl Scully into the group, replacing John McDermott, who had stepped in temporarily in 2004. In 2007, the South Carolina Legislature issued a proclamation welcoming the trio to that State at their performance in Charleston.

== Personal life ==
While attending classes at the Cork School of Music in 1984, Wright met Angela Desmond and, after he left the priesthood, they married in 1990. "By the time I left the priesthood I hadn't seen her for a few years. Then in 1988 I met her [again], by chance, and we met every day for a month and we haven't been apart since." The Wrights live with their two children in County Cork, Ireland. Wright's son Fergus produced and wrote 3 songs for his father's album "60".

== Discography ==
"Whatever You Believe"
Wright's 1992 No. 1 single from the album Whatever You Believe

=== Finbar Wright ===
Title	Year	Label	Sales	Notes
60	2017	Beaumex		Produced by Gavin Murphy, Fergus Wright, Finbar Wright
When I Need Love	2008	Dara-Dolphin		Produced by Finbar Wright
The Essential Finbar Wright	2006	Sony BMG	Gold	Compilation
Another Season	1999	Ritz	Gold	Wright wrote "Black Wind", "Freedom"
I Give My Heart	1997	Sony BMG	Platinum	Wright wrote song "My Girl's in Love With Depardieu"
Lift The Wings	1995	Sony BMG	Platinum	Wright wrote lyrics to "In My Arms"
A Tribute to John McCormack	1993	Sony BMG	Gold	Accompanied RTÉ special
Whatever You Believe	1992	Sony BMG	Platinum x3	Ireland No. 1 Christmas Single "Whatever You Believe"
Because	1991	Sony BMG	Platinum	Produced by Phil Coulter

=== The Irish Tenors ===
Title	Year	Notes
Live in Belfast	2000	PBS television
Ellis Island	2001	PBS television
Best of The Irish Tenors	2002	Compilation 1999–2001
We Three Kings	2003	Christmas
Heritage	2004	with the Chicagoland Pops Orchestra
Sacred	2005	Recorded in Prague

== Television ==
Title	Network	Broadcast Date	Location	Notes
Finbar Wright in Concert	PBS	1991	Belfast Opera House, Belfast, NI	
Music of the Night	RTÉ	1992/1993	RTÉ Studios, Dublin, Ireland	Co-hosted with Angeline Ball
Tribute to John McCormack	RTÉ	1994	National Concert Hall Dublin	
Live in Belfast	PBS	2000	Belfast Opera House, Belfast, NI	with the Irish Tenors
Ellis Island	PBS	2001	Ellis Island, NY, US	Billboard "Top 10 of 2001"
Heritage	PBS	2004	Rosemont Theater, Chicago, IL, US	with the Irish Tenors
The Irish Tenors & Friends	RTÉ	2006	Ardmore Studios, Bray, Co. Wicklow, Ireland	with the Irish Tenors

== Writing ==
Private Friends
- Genre: Poetry
- Published: 26 September 2001, Barleyfield Press
- Publication place: Ireland
- Pages: 42 pp (first edition)

The Gift of Glib (often referred to as "Gift of Gab") was not lost on this Corkman as Finbar began writing song lyrics several years ago, four of which have appeared on his recordings. A more literary style emerged and he began writing full-length verse. Private Friends is a collection of some of Wright's poetry published in 2001 and dedicated to his brother, Robert, who, at age 47, had died suddenly the same year.

== Awards ==
- Ireland Feis Ceoil Singing Competition Dublin, winner x 4
- BBC Cardiff "Singer of the World" winner 1989
- "Male Entertainer of the Year" 1992 Irish Recorded Music Association
- "Male Entertainer of the Year" 1993 Irish Recorded Music Association

== Career timeline ==
- 1979 – Deacon at historic Papal Mass, Phoenix Park, Dublin, Ireland
- 1979–1987 – Catholic Priest
- 1989 – Winner BBC Cardiff "Singer of the World"
- 1989-Pres – Solo Singing Artist
- 1991 – US PBS special, "Finbar Wright in Concert"
- 1992 – Debut at Carnegie Hall, New York City, US
- 1992 – Album Whatever You Believe reached triple platinum sales and single "Whatever You Believe" hit No. 1
- 1991–1993 – Host "Music of the Night" RTÉ
- 1992 – IRMA "Male Entertainer of the Year"
- 1993 – IRMA "Male Entertainer of the Year"
- 1994 – Narrated and Performed in RTÉ's "Tribute to John McCormack" special
- 1991–1999 – Sony BMG Artist
- 1999–2003 – Ritz Records Artist/Music Matters Artist
- 2000-Pres – Member of the "Irish Tenors"
- 2001 – As part of the Irish Tenors performed in the historic US PBS special "Ellis Island"
- 2004 – Landmark performance at the Hollywood Bowl with the Irish Tenors and guests, Three Mo' Tenors, with the LA Philharmonic
- 2005 – Sang with Anthony Kearns for US television's ABC "Good Morning America" coverage of the funeral for former President Ronald Reagan.
