= Blackwater Valley Opera Festival =

Classical music and opera event in Lismore, County Waterford

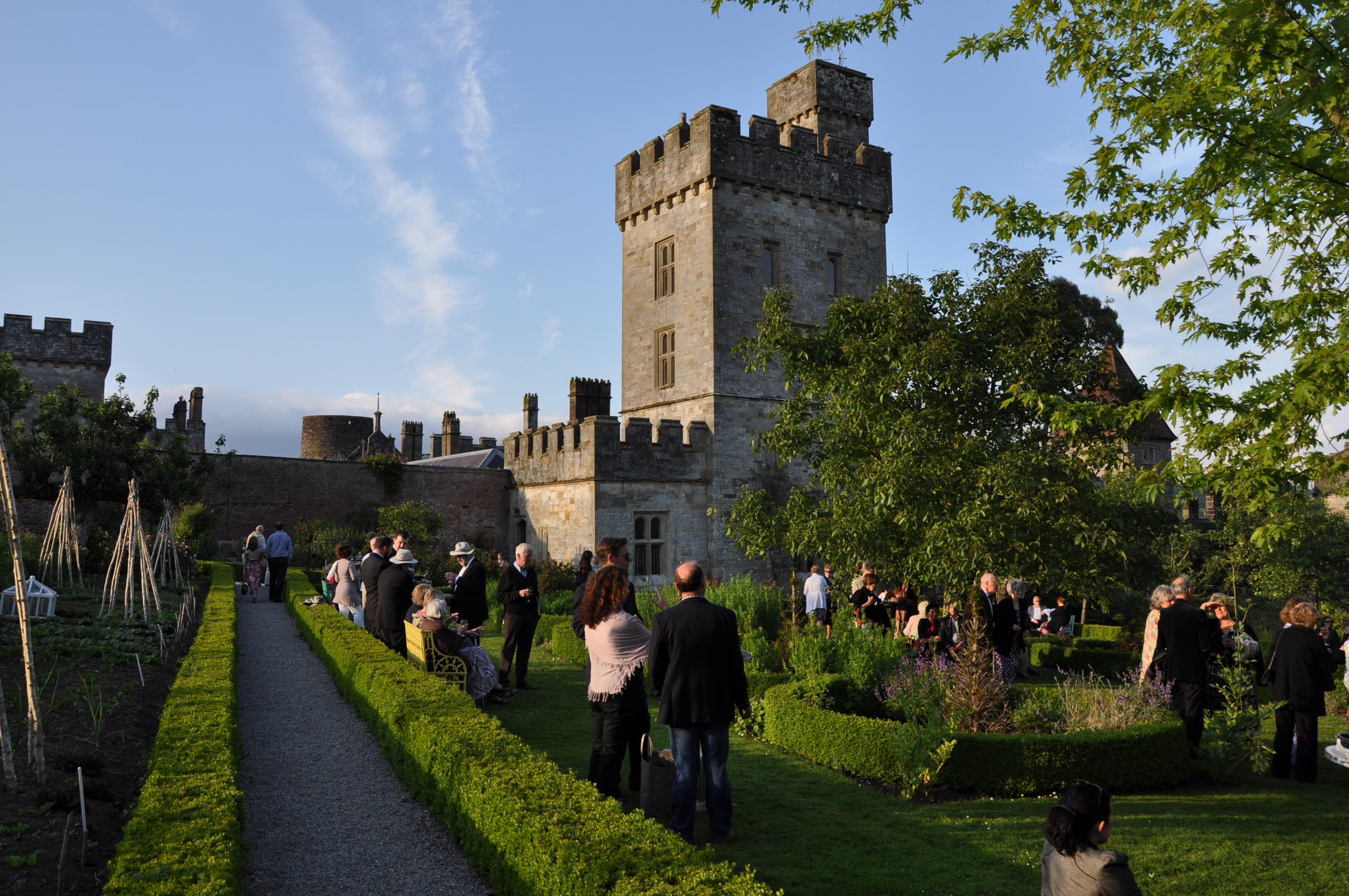
Lismore Castle Gardens, County Waterford

The Blackwater Valley Opera Festival (formerly the Lismore Opera Festival and Lismore Music Festival) is a classical music and opera festival held annually in Lismore, County Waterford, Ireland. Founded in 2010 by Jennifer O'Connell and Dieter Kaegi, the festival was re-launched as the Blackwater Valley Opera Festival in February 2018.

Previous events have consisted of three opera nights performed in Lismore Castle's stable yard. Concerts and recitals have also been staged in Lismore and in historic homes located along the banks of the Blackwater River downstream to the parish of Cappoquin. These venues have included Salterbridge House, Cappoquin House, Tourin House, Dromore Yard and Lismore Cathedral.

In 2012, Irish President Michael D. Higgins inaugurated the festival's annual school's access programme.

Marco Zambelli was the conductor of the festival for several years, except in 2016, when Killian Farrell conducted Così fan tutte, and in 2019 when Darren Hargan conducted Don Pasquale. The 2019 festival presented two operas for the first time, with 15 performances in total, including a solo recital by Giovanni Bellucci.

While the 2020 event was cancelled as a response to the COVID-19 pandemic, the festival's organisers ran outdoor concerts for residential care home residents. By March 2021, this concert series was described as "the largest arts and health intervention supported in response to the COVID-19 pandemic in Ireland" and had included 350 live classical music concerts involving artists like Anthony Kearns, Des Keogh, Celine Byrne and Iarla Ó Lionáird. The 2021 program was also modified due to COVID-19 restrictions and included a number of free open-air recitals in Lismore, Dungarvan, Youghal and Waterford.

The 2022 event included a free open-air concert in Fermoy, as well as concerts from Maurice Steger, Giovanni Bellucci, and Irish Baroque Orchestra.

== Past productions ==
- 2010 Carmen by Georges Bizet
- 2011 Don Giovanni by Wolfgang Amadeus Mozart
- 2012 The Barber of Seville by Gioachino Rossini
- 2013 The Marriage of Figaro by Wolfgang Amadeus Mozart
- 2014 The Magic Flute by Wolfgang Amadeus Mozart
- 2015 La Cenerentola by Gioachino Rossini
- 2016 Così fan tutte by Wolfgang Amadeus Mozart
- 2017 L'elisir d'amore by Gaetano Donizetti (with tenor Anthony Kearns)
- 2018 L'italiana in Algeri by Gioachino Rossini
- 2019 Don Pasquale by Gaetano Donizetti and The Sleeping Queen by Michael William Balfe
- 2021 Gianni Schicchi by Giacomo Puccini
- 2022 Orfeo ed Euridice by Christoph Willibald Gluck
- 2023 Macbeth by Giuseppe Verdi
- 2024 Giulio Cesare by George Frideric Handel
- 2025 A Midsummer Night's Dream by Benjamin Britten
- 2026 Don Giovanni by Mozart
