= John McDermott (singer) =

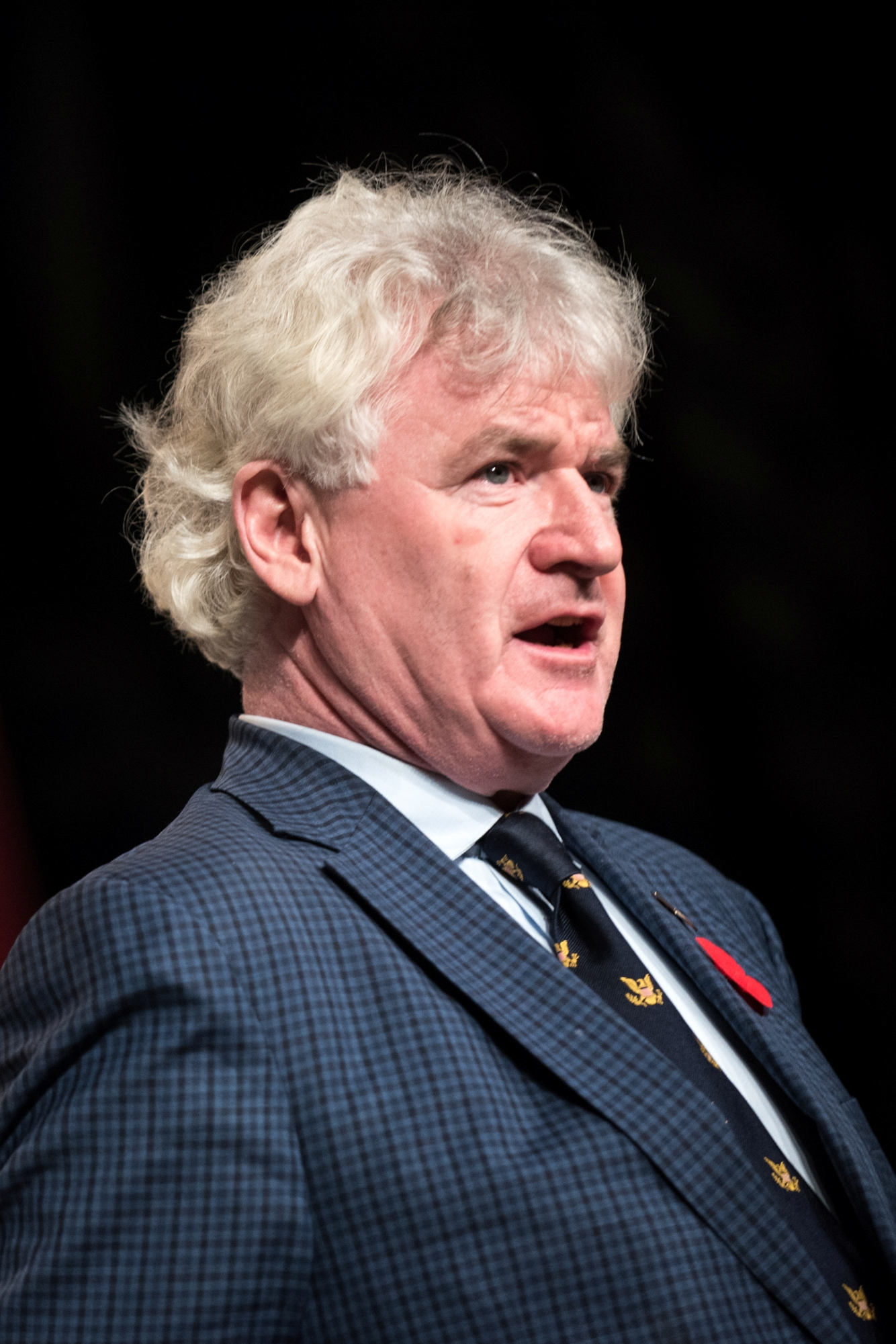

Background information
- Born: John Charles McDermott; 25 March 1955 (age 71); Glasgow, Scotland
- Genres: Celtic music
- Occupations: Singer, songwriter, record producer
- Instruments: Vocals, piano, keyboards, guitar
- Years active: 1980–present
- Label: EMI
- Website: johnmcdermott.com

John Charles McDermott (born 25 March 1955) is a Scottish-Canadian tenor. With Irish roots on both sides of his family, with his father Peter McDermott, immigrating to Scotland from Ireland. John McDermott is best known for his rendering of the songs "Danny Boy" and "Loch Lomond". Born in Glasgow, Scotland, McDermott moved with his family to Willowdale, Toronto, Canada, in 1965. Growing up in a musical family, his only formal musical training was at St. Michael's Choir School in Toronto, Ontario, in 1971 and 1972.

== Starting out ==
After singing at weddings for a few years, he joined with several other choristers to form a group, named The Mistletones, in 1980. He performed "The Ballad of Harry Warden", the closing theme of the 1981 Canadian slasher film My Bloody Valentine.

Starting in 1988, he has regularly been called upon to sing the national anthems at Boston Red Sox, Toronto Blue Jays and Toronto Maple Leafs games. From 1984 through 1992, he worked as a circulation representative for the Toronto Sun; Conrad Black heard him singing at company parties. Black, along with other executives, financed McDermott's independent recording of "Danny Boy" in 1992, which was picked up and released in North America by EMI Music Canada. Following this unexpected success, McDermott decided to pursue a professional singing career.

== Professional career ==
He performed his first concert at the Rebecca Cohn Theatre on 5 October 1993 in Halifax, Nova Scotia. From there he continued to tour the rest of Canada, performing as an opening act for The Chieftains. Throughout 1994, he went on a tour of Australia and New Zealand, following the great success of "Danny Boy", which had been ranked Number 1 on the charts there and achieved triple platinum in New Zealand. Next, in 1995, he went on a tour of Britain with The Seekers.

At this point in his career he was becoming recognized internationally, so he started to tour regularly as a solo act rather than an opening act. He also appeared at several special events including the D-Day ceremonies in France in 1995, and the United States Democratic National Convention in 1996. He has also appeared on television several times, both as a host of CBC Television concert specials in 1997, and in his own television special titled John McDermott: A Time to Remember, which aired on PBS in 2002. He formed The Irish Tenors, and after performing a large concert in Dublin, Ireland in 1998, they spent some time touring the United States, appearing on television, and releasing a gold record.

Since leaving the Irish Tenors, McDermott continues to tour extensively throughout the World, performing with his own group and with the great symphonies of the world. He continues to work to support the veteran community in the United States and in Canada. In 2000, McDermott dedicated McDermott House in Washington, D.C., a transitional home for homeless veterans. His latest release, Journeys: Bringing Buddy Home, was recorded to help support fundraising for Fisher House Boston and launch the Canadian initiative for an outreach centre for Canadian veterans.

In 2010, McDermott took part in the World Jazz for Haiti charity album, recorded at Number 9 Audio Group in support of the Red Cross disaster relief fund. The album featured Canadian artists such as David Clayton-Thomas and Holly Cole.

== Discography ==
- Danny Boy (1992) – Canada: double platinum, Australia No. 25
- Battlefields of Green (1993)
- Old Friends (1994) (platinum)
- Christmas Memories (1994) (platinum)
- Love Is a Voyage (1995) (platinum)
- When I Grow Too Old to Dream (1997)
- If Ye Break Faith.... (1998 Canada), in the US Remembrance (1999)
- Danny Boy Collection (1998) (triple platinum)
- Daughter of Mine (1999) (EP)
- The Irish Tenors with Ronan Tynan and Anthony Kearns (1999) – Australia No. 57
- Love Is a Voyage (2000) (remastered)
- A Day to Myself (2001)
- O Canada (2001)
- A Time to Remember (2002)
- My Forever Friend (2003)
- Stories of Love (2003)
- Songs of the Isles – Ireland (2004)
- Songs of the Isles – Scotland (2004)
- Just Plain Folk (2005) (with Michael P Smith)
- Salute to Our Veterans (2005) (with the pipes and drums of the Ottawa Police Service)
- Legacy of the Patriot (2006)
- On a Whim – The Songs of Ron Sexsmith (2006)
- Images of Christmas (2006) (duets)
- Sharing Christmas – John McDermott & Friends (2007)
- Great is Thy Faithfulness (2008)
- Journeys – Bringing Buddy Home (2009)
- The Old House (2012) (with Jason Fowler)
- My Gentle Harp: A Tribute to Thomas Moore (2012)
- A Traditional Christmas (2012)
- How Great Thou Art (2014)
- Daughter of Mine (2014)
- The Contender (2014)

== Awards and recognition ==
- For his support for veterans' causes, John McDermott was made an honorary member of The War Amps.
- Also for supporting veterans' causes, he has received the US Congressional Medal of Honor Society's Bob Hope Award. September 2001
- Received The Chapel of Four Chaplains " Legion of Honor Award " April 2002
- Received a Minister of Veterans Affairs Commendation for his work on behalf of Veterans 2010.
- Received five Juno nominations (1993–1998)
- Received the Ted Williams Globe and Anchor Award from the United States Marine Corps Semper Fidelis Society. November. 2011
- McDermott was called the "worthy heir to the famed Irish tenor John McCormack" (Chicago Sun-Times).

== See also ==
- John McCormack (tenor)
