= Karl Scully =

Irish opera singer

Karl Scully (born 10 June 1978) is an Irish opera tenor.

== Early life ==
Karl Scully was born in Limerick, Ireland. He is a graduate of the Manhattan School of Music and was a recipient of the Liberace Scholarship and the Mae Zenke Orvis Endowed Opera Scholarship.

== Career ==
He kick-started his career in 2000 when he played the role of Count John McCormack in the cinematic film “Nora”, by Pat Murphy and Gerard Stembridge, starring Ewan McGregor. He followed his on screen success by performing operatic roles such as: Don Jose in “Carmen” by Bizet; The Witch in “Hansel and Gretel” by Humperdinck; MacHeath, in “Beggars Opera” and Albert, in “Albert Herring” by Benjamin Britten; King Ouf in “L'etoile” by Chabrier; Paolino, in "Il Matrimonio Segreto" by Cimarosa; Ferrando, in “Cosi Fan Tutte” by Mozart; and Arturo in “Lucia di Lammermoor" by Gaetano Donizetti. During his time in Italy, Karl was a permanent artist in the Teatro Carlo Felice Opera House in Genoa. While there he performed solo roles alongside world-famous artists including Samuel Ramey, Robert Brubaker, and Dwayne Croft.

=== The Irish Tenors ===
Karl's was heard by two Irish Tenors, Anthony Kearns and Finbar Wright, who invited him to join the group in 2006. Soon after Karl returned to the screens to star in 'The Irish Tenors and Friends,' a 10 part television show.

From 2006–2011, Karl was a member of The Irish Tenors and performed with them and as a soloist in Europe and the US.
