= Kathleen Watkins =

Irish broadcaster, harpist and actress (1934–2024)

- Born: 17 October 1934; Saggart, Dublin, Ireland
- Died: 7 November 2024 (aged 90); Dublin, Ireland
- Education: Dominican College Sion Hill
- Occupations: Broadcaster; harpist; singer; author
- Years active: 1961–2024
- Spouse: Gay Byrne (m. 1964; died 2019)
- Children: 2

Kathleen Watkins (17 October 1934 – 7 November 2024) was an Irish broadcaster, harpist, actress, singer and author. She was married to Gay Byrne from 1964 until his death in 2019.

In her early career, Watkins worked as a folk singer and harpist. She was the first continuity presenter to appear on RTÉ television when it was launched in 1961. She played Grace Gifford in the 1966 docudrama Insurrection. She hosted the Rose of Tralee in 1977, the only woman to do so until Kathryn Thomas began co-hosting in 2023. Watkins published three children's books and two poetry collections.

Watkins died in Dublin on 7 November 2024, at the age of 90.
