= Grumpy Old Men (TV series) =

British television series (2003–2006)

- Genre: Conversational comedy Reality
- Narrated by: Geoffrey Palmer
- Country of origin: United Kingdom
- Original language: English
- No. of series: 3 + 2 specials
- No. of episodes: 14

Production
- Running time: 30 mins

Original release
- Network: BBC Two
- Release: 9 October 2003 – 19 May 2006

Related
- Grumpy Old Women (2004–07)

Grumpy Old Men is a conversational-style British television series, first shown in October 2003 on BBC Two. The first run of four programmes was repeated several times before a second series, also of four episodes, was shown in 2004. A third series was broadcast in April 2006. There was also a 2003 Christmas special. An Irish version, Gaybo's Grumpy Men, was produced by RTÉ in 2005.

== Format ==
The format shows a number of well-known middle-aged men talking about any issues of modern life which irritate them, from the proliferation of excessive road signs to unnecessary and overly loud mobile phone conversations.

Regular contributors include Jeremy Clarkson, Bob Geldof, John Humphrys, A. A. Gill, Nigel Havers, Tony Hawks, Simon Hoggart, John O'Farrell, Rory McGrath, Bill Nighy, Matthew Parris, John Peel, Will Self, Arthur Smith, Tim Rice, Rick Stein, Tony Slattery, Rick Wakeman, Lemn Sissay, Don Warrington, Des Lynam, Richard Madeley, Kelvin MacKenzie, Felix Dexter and Michael Grade. The narrator was Geoffrey Palmer.

== Spin-offs ==
The success of the series spawned Grumpy Old Women, first as a Christmas special and then as a full series in 2005. It repeated the formula of the original, featuring famous middle-aged women talking about their pet hates.

The grumpy old men and women together made a series, Grumpy Old Holidays, in which they talk about the frustrations of air travel, packing and so on. This was first shown on 18 June 2006.

A companion book to the series written by the original series producer Stuart Prebble, Grumpy Old Men (The Official Handbook), was published in 2004, followed by Grumpy Old Men: The Secret Diary in 2005 and Grumpy Old Christmas in 2006, also by Prebble. The first series and its accompanying Christmas special was released on DVD and an audiobook based on the first two series was also made available, read by Arthur Smith.

Following the success of Grumpy Old Men/Women, the producers, Liberty Bell TV, have made a number of other series based on the same format, including Grumpy Old Holidays, It's Grim Up North, My Appalling School Report, He Says, She Says and The Meaning Of Life. All of these were broadcast on BBC Two, except the last-named which was on BBC One.

The Grumpy Guide to Christmas was shown on BBC Two on 23 December 2009.
