= Gaybo's Grumpy Men =

- Also known as: Grumpy Old Men
- Genre: Conversational, Comedy & Reality
- Narrated by: Gay Byrne
- Country of origin: Ireland
- Original language: English
- No. of seasons: 1 Special
- No. of episodes: 1

Production
- Running time: 60 Minutes

Original release
- Network: RTÉ
- Release: 30 December 2005

Related
- Grumpy Old Men

Gaybo's Grumpy Men is an Irish version of the BBC conversational-style television programme Grumpy Old Men on RTÉ which debuted in 2005. This Christmas special featured Gay Byrne as the onscreen presenter, as well as interviewer of his Grumpy Men, this differed from the BBC version in which Geoffrey Palmer is merely the narrator.

The format shows a number of well-known middle-aged men talk about things which annoy.

Contributors, listed in alphabetical order, include Paraic Breathnach, Dave Fanning, Gary Kavanagh, Gerry Lundberg, David Norris, Brendan O'Carroll, Páidí Ó Sé, Cathal O'Shannon, John O'Shea, Alan Stanford & Steve Wall.
