= Gottfried Kägi =

Swiss skeleton racer

Gottfried Kägi (18 February 1911 – ?) was a Swiss skeleton racer who competed in the late 1940s. He finished fifth in the men's skeleton event at the 1948 Winter Olympics in St. Moritz.
