= Dieter Kaegi =

Swiss opera director

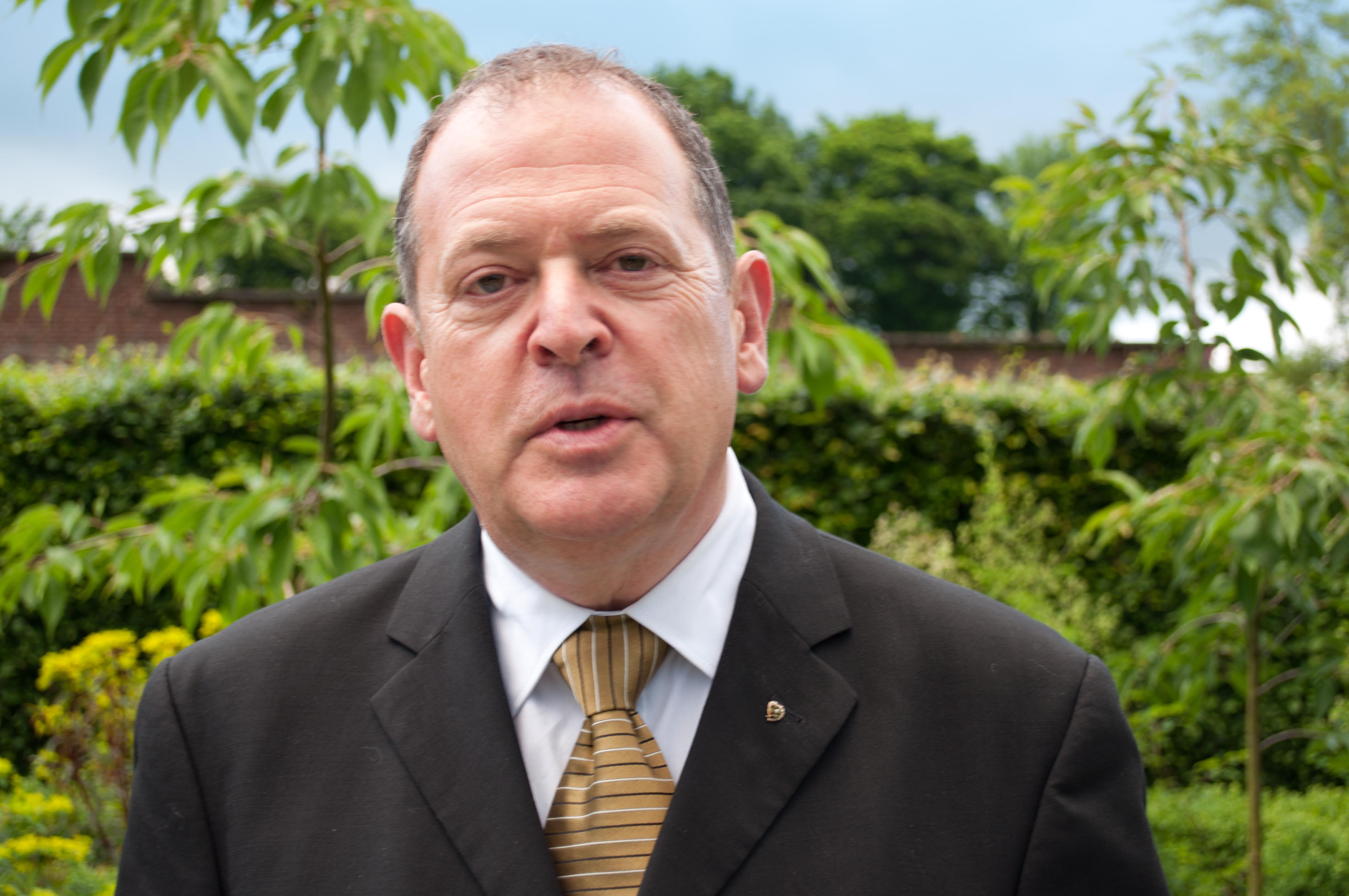
- Dieter Kaegi in Lismore Castle Gardens
- Born: Dieter Kaegi; Zurich, Switzerland
- Occupation: Opera Director
- Years active: 1980—Present
- Awards: Cavaliere services to the Arts

Dieter Kaegi (born 1957) is a Swiss opera director.

== Biography ==
Kaegi was born in 1957 in Zurich, Switzerland.

In 1980, Dieter Kaegi was assistant director at the Zurich Opera under Claus Helmut Drese. In 1982, he became assistant to French opera director Jean-Pierre Ponnelle. During this time, he worked on opera productions for the stage and film. TV productions included L'Italiana in Algeri (1986), two episodes of Live from the Metropolitan Opera Idomeneo (1983) and Le Nozze di Figaro (1985), Cardillac (1985) and Tristan und Isolde (1983).

From 1990 until 1998, he worked as director of productions at the Festival d'Art Lyrique d'Aix-en-Provence.

In 1998, he was appointed Artistic Director of Opera Ireland in Dublin. In 2010, he co-founded Lismore Music Festival. later renamed Blackwater Valley Opera Festival. Kaegi continues to be the event's artistic director.

Since 2012, Dieter Kaegi is General Director of the small Theater und Orchester Biel Solothurn (TOBS) in Switzerland.

== Honours ==
In 2008, Kaegi was presented the Order of Cavaliere by the Italian Government for his services to the arts and opera.
