= The Meaning of Life (TV series) =

Irish interview television series (2009–2016)

- Also known as: The Meaning of Life with Gay Byrne
- Genre: Interview
- Starring: Gay Byrne
- Country of origin: Ireland
- Original language: English
- No. of series: 12
- No. of episodes: 50

Original release
- Network: RTÉ One
- Release: 19 April 2009 – 16 October 2016

The Meaning of Life is an Irish television programme, broadcast on RTÉ One. Presented by Gay Byrne, each edition involves the veteran broadcaster interviewing a prominent public figure.

Interviews with former Taoiseach Bertie Ahern and actors Gabriel Byrne and Brenda Fricker during the second series attracted media attention. Ahern spoke of his religious habits, Byrne and Fricker of being sexually abused as children.

Joe Duffy took over as host from Gay Byrne in 2020.

== Episode list ==
=== Series 1 ===
No.	Original release date	Guest(s)
1	19 April 2009	Colin Farrell
The actor spoke of topics such as his father and his addictions.
2	26 April 2009	Gerry Adams
The Sinn Féin leader spoke of the process of concluding resentment, indignation or anger as a result of a perceived offence, difference or mistake, and ceasing to demand punishment or restitution, the great unknown, Final Judgment and how his beliefs have affected his life as a republican. Byrne said this meeting with Adams had lacked any confrontation but described it as "an interview where you certainly had to think on your feet".
3	3 May 2009	Maeve Binchy
The writer spoke of losing her beliefs as a Roman Catholic during a journey to Jerusalem as a young adult, describing it as "the Road to Damascus experience in reverse".
4	10 May 2009	Ronan Keating
The singer was described by Byrne as "a revelation" after the episode. Keating spoke of his disagreements with his manager Louis Walsh, the death of his mother from cancer and the Marie Keating Foundation which resulted.
5	17 May 2009	Sinéad O'Connor
The musician spoke of her views about the deity of her belief system and how this affects her artistic output. She later said she an Byrne had had "a lovely morning together". The interview was filmed in January 2009 at O'Connor's house. Byrne referenced the interview in an article he wrote for the Sunday Independent later that day.
6	24 May 2009	Neil Jordan
The writer and filmmaker immediately denied being religious, but indicated spiritual beliefs when he stated his view that life continues after the permanent termination of the biological functions that define a living organism. Jordan recalled his father telling him he would return after death and their subsequent post-death encounter during a stormy fixed-wing aircraft flight.

=== Series 2 ===
No.	Original release date	Guest(s)
7	17 January 2010	Gabriel Byrne
The actor spoke for the first time about sexual abuse he had received from the Christian Brothers when he was a boy and also said he had left the priesthood after he "walked up the stairs behind two girls in miniskirts" while on a bus in London.
8	24 January 2010	Tommy Tiernan
9	31 January 2010	Brenda Fricker
The actress spoke about being beaten by her mother and sexually abused by a friend.
10	7 February 2010	Bertie Ahern
The former Taoiseach confessed he had not confessed in the past 40 years but often went to Mass and spoke of the intimacy he shared with Ian Paisley over their religion while in London in 2004.
11	14 February 2010	Mary Robinson
12	21 February 2010	Edna O'Brien

=== Series 3 ===
No.	Original release date	Guest(s)
13	26 September 2010	Terry Wogan
The BBC broadcaster discussed his atheism.
14	3 October 2010	Fionnula Flanagan
15	10 October 2010	Deepak Chopra
16	17 October 2010	Ian Paisley
17	TBA	Mícheál Ó Muircheartaigh
18	TBA	Dana Rosemary Scallon

=== Series 4 ===
No.	Original release date	Guest(s)
19	TBA	Michael Parkinson
20	TBA	Brendan O'Carroll
21	TBA	Mark Patrick Hederman
22	TBA	Brian Cody
23	TBA	Martin Sheen
The actor spoke of his pro-life views and said his wife was conceived through a rape and he says had her mother aborted her, or dumped her in the Ohio River as she had considered, his wife would not exist. He also talked about three of his grandchildren who were conceived out of wedlock, saying his sons "were not happy at the time but they came to love these children. We have three grown grandchildren, two of them are married, they're some of the greatest source of joy in our lives."
24	TBA	Ben Dunne

=== Series 5 ===
No.	Original release date	Guest(s)
25	8 January 2012	Andrea Corr
26	15 January 2012	Paddy Moloney
27	22 January 2012	Shay Cullen
28	29 January 2012	Richard Branson
29	5 February 2012	Bob Geldof
30	TBA	Mary Byrne

=== Series 6 ===
No.	Original release date	Guest(s)
31	9 October 2012	Mary McAleese
The former President of Ireland spoke about same-sex marriage.
32	14 October 2012	Noel Gallagher
33	22 January 2012	Seán Gallagher
The businessman gave his first televised interview since his presidential failure.
34	28 October 2012	Niall Quinn

=== Series 7 ===
No.	Original release date	Guest(s)
35	6 January 2013	Colm Tóibín
36	12 January 2013	J. P. Donleavy
37	20 January 2013	John Lonergan
Former governor of Mountjoy Prison
38	27 January 2013	Maureen Gaffney
UCD Clinical Psychologist
39	3 February 2013	Maria Doyle Kennedy

=== Bono special episode ===
No.	Original release date	Guest(s)
40	25 June 2013	Bono
The musician talked about his humanitarian work, his religious faith, and also his parents' marriage and father's death.

=== Series 8 ===
No.	Original release date	Guest(s)
41	6 October 2013	Colm Wilkinson
The musical star spoke of his absence of faith.
42	TBA	Emily O'Reilly
43	TBA	Peter McVerry
44	TBA	Celine Byrne

=== Series 9 ===
The ninth series began airing on 4 May 2014.

No.	Original release date	Guest(s)
45	4 May 2014	Majella O'Donnell
Interview with the cancer sufferer.
46	TBA	Rory O'Neill
Interview with the man behind the make-up.
47	TBA	Sean O'Sullivan
Interview with the ex-Dragons' Den star.
48	TBA	Eamon Dunphy
Interview with the soccer man.
49	TBA	David Puttnam
Interview with the film producer and British Lord.
50	TBA	Enda Kenny
Interview with the man behind the make-up.

=== Series 10 ===
No.	Original release date	Guest(s)
51	TBA	Cecila Ahern
Interview about growing up with Bertie Aherne.
52	TBA	Stephen Fry
Actor, Comedian, Writer, and Humanist.
53	TBA	Barry McGuigan
Boxer talks about his Catholic faith.
54	TBA	Mary Black
Talks about her disillusion with the Church, her struggles with depression and her mystical experiences.
55	TBA	Rowan Williams
Former Archbishop of Canterbury and now Master of Magdalene College, Cambridge.

=== Series 11 ===
No.	Original release date	Guest(s)
56	TBA	Hozier
Singer.
57	TBA	Joan Burton
Tánaiste talks about adoption, her early influences, politics and morality.
58	TBA	Richard Dawkins
Evolutionary biologist.
59	TBA	Stanislaus Kennedy
Nun.
60	TBA	Eckhart Tolle
Author.

=== Series 12 ===
No.	Original release date	Guest(s)
61	TBA	Ruby Wax
Comedienne.
62	TBA	Dolores Keane
Singer who shares her fight against alcoholism, breast cancer and depression.
63	TBA	John Sheahan
Former member of The Dubliners.
64	TBA	Garry Hynes
Theatre director and founder of Druid Theatre Company.

== Reception ==
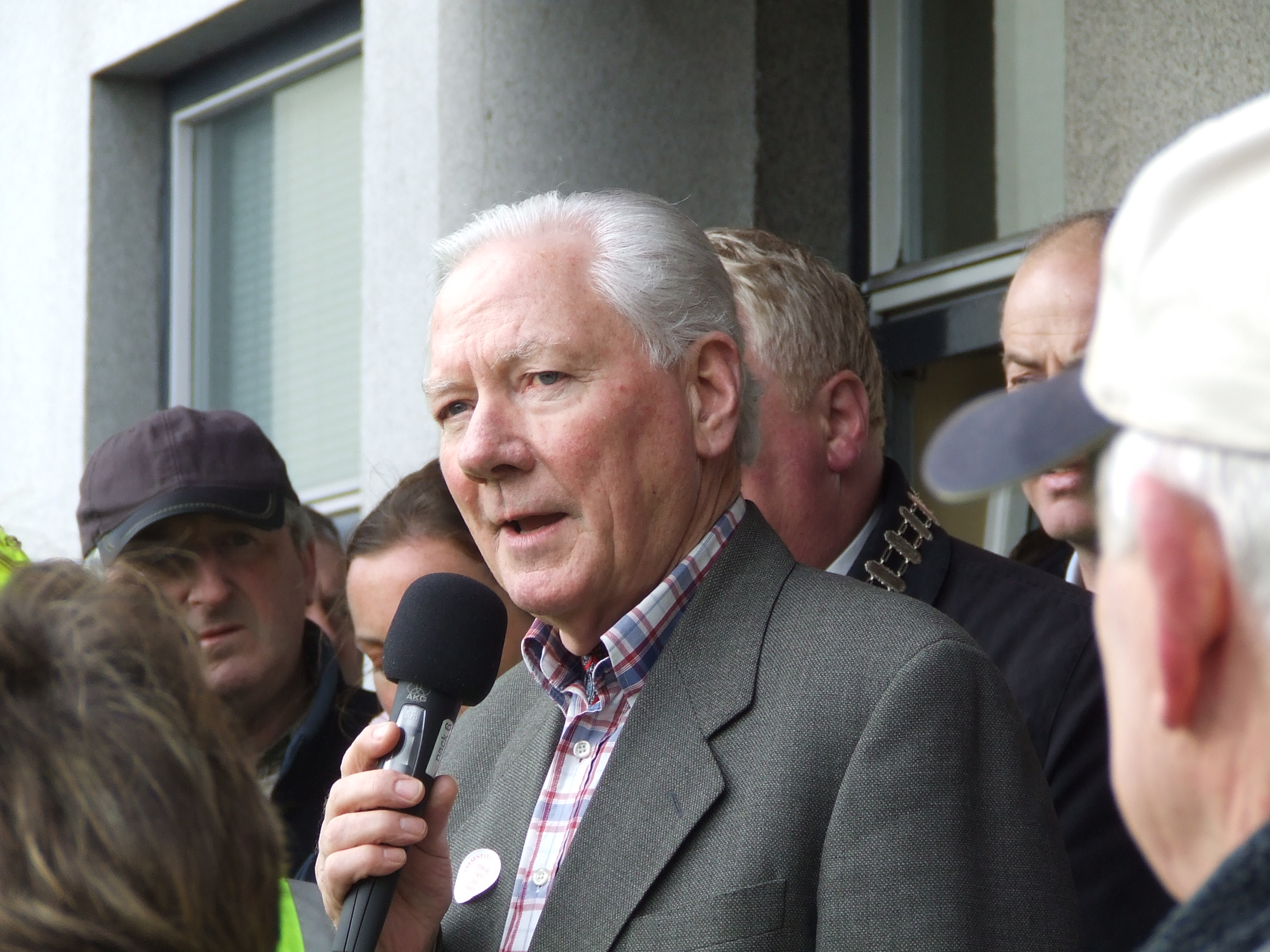
Gay Byrne is the presenter.

John Boland of the Irish Independent claimed the series became "more religious in thrust and tone as it progressed". He described the episode featuring Neil Jordan as a "bizarre encounter", in which the writer and filmmaker "grew more and more bemused" as Byrne questioned him in great detail about his religious faith. Jordan answered such questions as "Do you think your religion might return to you on your deathbed?" and "Do you think there's a day of reckoning?" with "I really haven't got a clue" and "I don't know, Gay" but when he commented that "every time I'm in a plane and it's hit by lightning I bless myself", Byrne replied "Hah!", as if, according to Boland, Jordan had "just revealed a basic faith in the Catholic Almighty rather than a reflex reaction to imminent catastrophe".

The Irish Times's Kevin Courtney said of The Meaning of Life: "The title is a bit grandiose – you could just as easily call it Tell Uncle Gaybo All About It.

Byrne prefers not to discuss his own faith:

I am not going to say, because it would compromise me in terms of the show if people knew I had a position. What you find is that they are all searching. No one has the truth.

== Viewing figures ==
An average of 247,000 viewers tuned into the first four episodes of the series, featuring interviews with Farrell, Adams, Binchy and Keating. The episode featuring Keating attracted the most viewers, with a total of 258,000 reported. Next was the Adams interview, with 251,000 viewers. This was followed by the interview with Binchy which had 231,000 viewers.
