= Who Wants to Be a Millionaire? (Irish game show) =

Irish game show

- The logo used in 2002
- Genre: Quiz show
- Based on: Who Wants to Be a Millionaire? by: David Briggs; Steven Knight; Mike Whitehill
- Presented by: Gay Byrne
- Composers: Keith Strachan; Matthew Strachan
- Country of origin: Ireland
- Original language: English
- No. of seasons: 2

Production
- Running time: 60 minutes
- Production company: Tyrone Productions

Original release
- Network: RTÉ One
- Release: 17 October 2000 – 29 March 2002

Who Wants to Be a Millionaire? is the Irish version of the British quiz show same title which aired on RTÉ One from 2000 to 2002. It was presented by Gay Byrne. The format was the same as on the British show, and the 15 incremental prize amounts had the same numeric values, from 100 up to 1,000,000. These values were denominated in Irish pounds in 2000 and 2001, and in euro in 2002, after the euro changeover.

== Production ==
The Irish version was made by Tyrone Productions under license from Celador, the British originators. The stage, music, and format were identical to the original British format. The quizmaster was Gay Byrne, who was famous as the longtime host of The Late Late Show, and was making one of several returns from retirement.

The top prize fell from (IEP) £1 million (€1,269,738) to €1 million after the euro changeover at the beginning of 2002. The prize money was funded by a combination of a premium-rate telephone number which candidates had to ring to be selected as contestants, and £7m from headline sponsor eircell, which was then eircom's mobile phone subsidiary company. As part of the sale to Vodafone Eircell was rebranded in 2001, as part of this re-brand the series was sponsored by Eircell Vodafone, this was the only use of the Vodafone brand on the series.

Initially the series aired on Friday and Tuesday night, with the Tuesday night episode split between an episode of the Irish soap opera Fair City. The show had several runs over consecutive Sunday evenings. After two years the initial sponsorship contract ended.

RTÉ and the Irish National Lottery company were in discussion about bring the series back as it had been put on hiatus following the loss of its main sponsor in 2002, the National Lottery said that no decision had been made but it was always a possibility, RTÉ axed the series fully in the summer of 2003 and the series would not be making a return for the 2003–04 season.

The biggest known winners were Roger Dowds from Glasnevin, who won £250,000 (€317,435) in January 2001,, stand-up comedian Paddy Courtney, who won £250,000 in June 2001, and Noel O'Connor from Dublin, who won €250,000 in March 2002, although it is not known if people have won more.

=== Specials ===
Two types of specials were produced, a celebrity edition (which usually aired around Christmas or New Year) and a generations edition.

=== Lunula controversy ===
In June 2001, contestant Shane O'Doherty was asked, as the 13th (£250,000) question, in what part of the body the lunula was. He used his phone-a-friend lifeline to ring a physician, who said it was in the heart, which was the answer he then gave. The desired answer was the nail (anatomy), and so O'Doherty's winnings fell from £125,000 back to the guaranteed £32,000. In fact, a lunula is any crescent or moon-shaped structure, including both the white base of the fingernail and the segments of the semilunar heart valves. O'Doherty protested that, since both answers were correct, he should not have been eliminated. He threatened to sue the producers, and the controversy generated media debate for two weeks. Eventually he was allowed to return to the show. He was asked another question, and opted to pass and keep the £125,000 he had previously accrued. The replacement question was also criticised as flawed; it described John Pius Boland as an "Olympic gold medallist" even though the medals received by winners at the 1896 Summer Olympics were actually silver.

== Money trees ==
Payout structure
| Question number | Question value | |
| Question number | 2000–2001 | 2002 |
|---|---|---|
| 15 | £1,000,000 (€1,269,738) | €1,000,000 |
| 14 | £500,000 (€634,869) | €500,000 |
| 13 | £250,000 (€317,435) | €250,000 |
| 12 | £125,000 (€158,717) | €125,000 |
| 11 | £64,000 (€81,263) | €64,000 |
| 10 | £32,000 (€40,632) | €32,000 |
| 9 | £16,000 (€20,316) | €16,000 |
| 8 | £8,000 (€10,158) | €8,000 |
| 7 | £4,000 (€5,079) | €4,000 |
| 6 | £2,000 (€2,539) | €2,000 |
| 5 | £1,000 (€1,270) | €1,000 |
| 4 | £500 (€635) | €500 |
| 3 | £300 (€381) | €300 |
| 2 | £200 (€254) | €200 |
| 1 | £100 (€127) | €100 |
Milestone Top prize
