= Celine Byrne =

Irish soprano (born 1977)

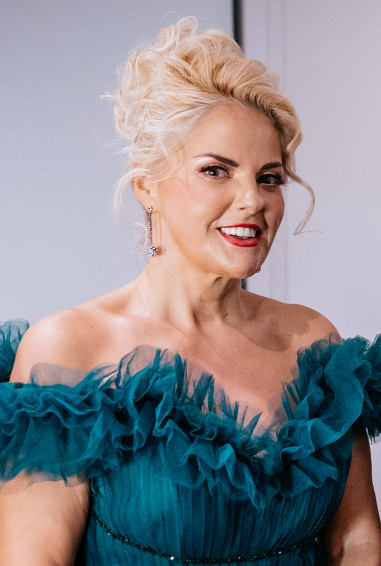
- Byrne in December 2025

Background information
- Born: May 3, 1977 (age 49); Kildare, Ireland
- Website: celinebyrne.com

Celine Byrne (born 3 May 1977 in Kildare) is an Irish soprano.

== Career ==
She first saw opera live at Milan's La Scala when she worked there as an au pair after leaving school. She then decided she wanted to be an opera singer and upon her return home began her first singing lessons age 18. Byrne received her master's degree in music from the Royal Irish Academy of Music in 2007, where she studied with Veronica Dunne, also receiving the RIAM Award for Outstanding Achievement. In addition she has an honours music degree from the Conservatory of Music and Drama, Dublin, where she was awarded the college Gold Medal for excellence. She has received coaching at the National Opera Studio of London and has studied with Christa Ludwig at the Vienna State Opera. In 2007 Byrne was awarded the first prize and gold medal at the Maria Callas Grand Prix, Athens. Other awards include the Margaret Burke Sheridan Gold Medal in 2009 for her contribution to the arts, the William Young Prize at the Veronica Dunne International Singing Competition, Dublin 2007, and the Brabants Dagblad Press Prize at the International Vocal Competition 's-Hertogenbosch, Netherlands.

On television she has performed on The Late Late Show and received her own episode of The Meaning of Life.

Byrne made her operatic debut as Mimì in Scottish Opera's 2010 production of La bohème. In the seasons that have followed, she has performed extensively throughout Europe as well as in the United States, China, Russia and Mexico including performances at the Royal Opera House, Deutsche Oper am Rhein, and Novaya Opera Theatre.
