= Ronan Tynan =

Irish singer (born 1960)

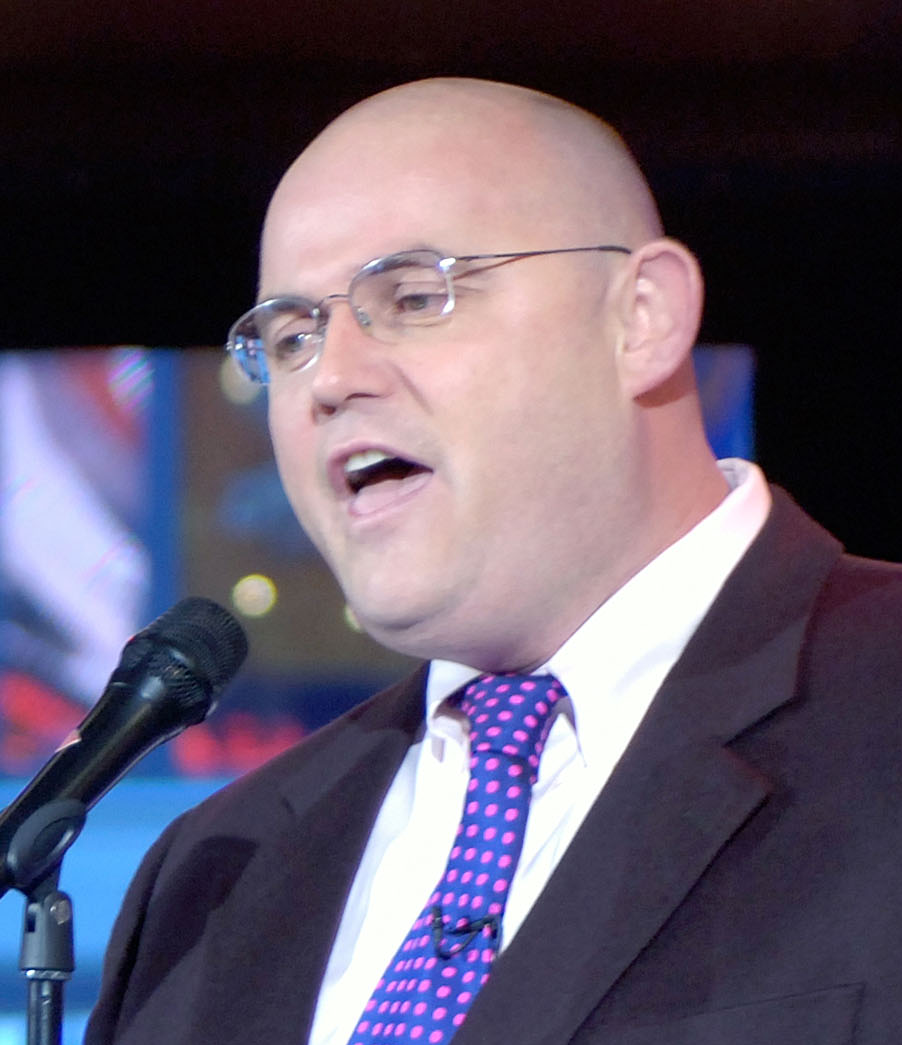
- Tynan performs on Good Morning America November 2006

Background information
- Born: 14 May 1960 (age 66); Dublin, Ireland
- Origin: County Kilkenny, Ireland
- Genre: Classical
- Occupations: Singer (physician by trade)
- Instrument: Vocals
- Years active: 1984–present
- Member of: The Irish Tenors
- Website: Ronan Tynan

Ronan Tynan (born 14 May 1960) is an Irish tenor singer and former Paralympic athlete.

He was a member of The Irish Tenors re-joining in 2011 while continuing to pursue his solo career since May 2004. In the United States, audiences know him for his involvement with that vocal group and for his renditions of "God Bless America." He is also known for participating in the 1984 and 1988 Summer Paralympics.

== Life and career ==
Tynan was born in Dublin, Ireland. His family home is in Johnstown, County Kilkenny, Ireland. He was born with phocomelia, causing both of his lower legs to be underdeveloped; his legs were unusually short (he is now 6-foot 4), his feet were splayed outward, and he had three toes on each foot. He was one of a set of twins; his twin brother Edmond died at 11 months old. At age 20, he had his legs amputated below the knee, after a back injury from a car accident; the injury to his back made it impossible for him to continue using prosthetic legs without the amputation. Within weeks of the accident, he was climbing stairs at his college dormitory on artificial legs. Within a year, Tynan was winning in international competitions in track and field athletics. He represented Ireland in the 1984 and 1988 Summer Paralympics, winning four golds, two silvers, and one bronze medal. Between 1981 and 1984, he won 18 gold medals from various competitions and set 14 world records.

In the following years, Tynan became the first person with a disability to be admitted to the National College of Physical Education, in Limerick. He worked for about two years in the prosthetics industry, then went to Trinity College, became a physician specialising in Orthopedic Sports Injuries, and graduated in 1993.

Encouraged to also study voice by his father Edmund, Tynan won a series of voice competition awards and joined the Irish Tenors.

A devout Roman Catholic, Tynan has appeared on Eternal Word Television Network (EWTN). At the invitation of New York Archbishop Timothy Dolan, he sang at the Archbishop's installation Mass in St. Patrick's Cathedral on 15 April 2009.

=== Presidential performances ===
As a very close friend of the Bush family, Tynan has performed in several events President George W. Bush has attended. Some of them include:

- State funerals of two presidents:
  - Ronald Reagan
  - George H. W. Bush
- George H. W. Bush's 80th birthday
- Prayer service marking George W. Bush's second inauguration
- Saint Patrick's Day reception with President Bush and Irish Taoiseach Bertie Ahern
- 2008 President's Dinner

=== Other performances ===
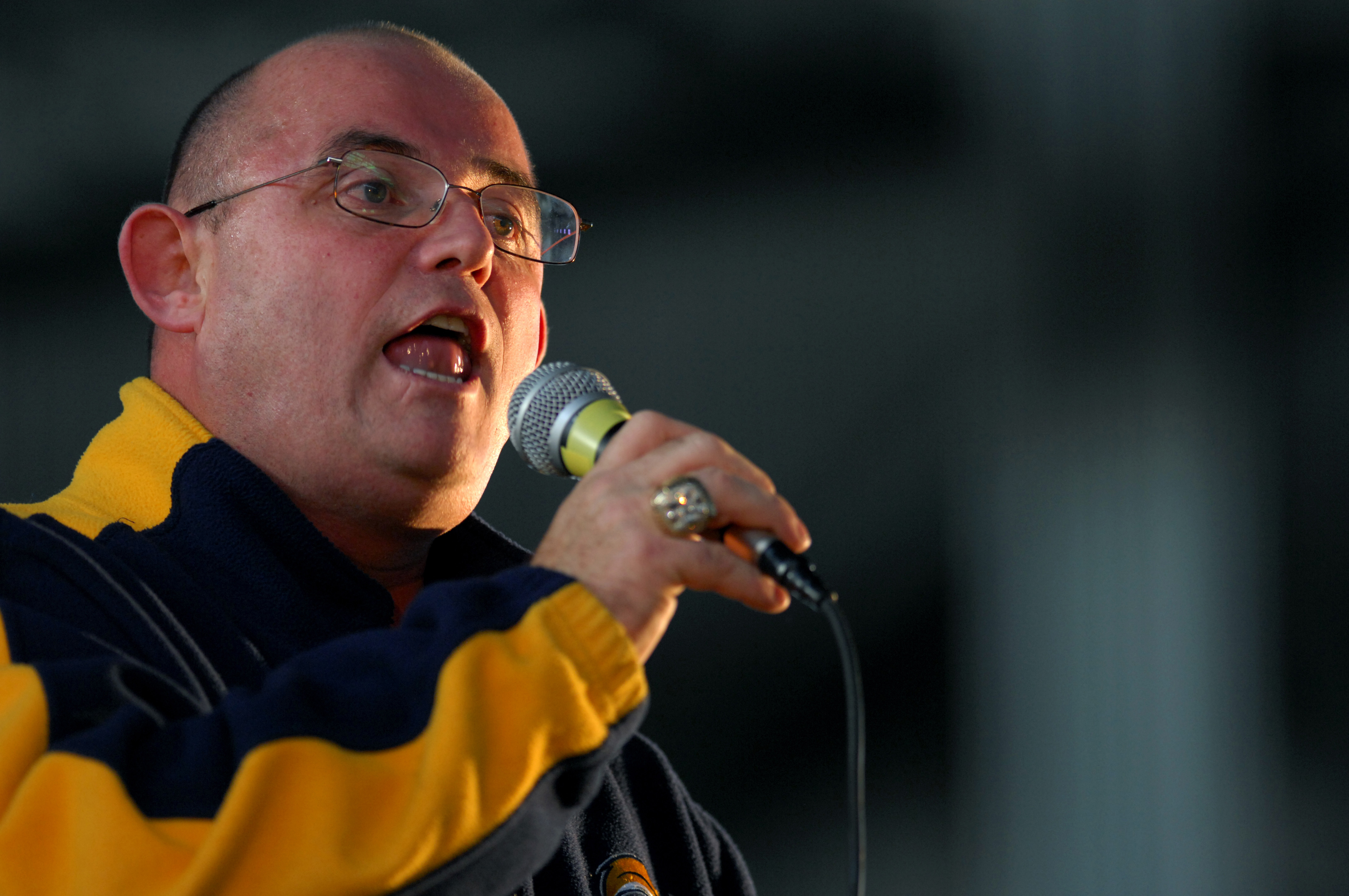
Tynan performs at a USO show at Aviano Air Base, Italy, December 2007

Tynan has sung "God Bless America" at sporting event venues, such as Yankee Stadium (during New York Yankees home Major League Baseball games, including Opening Day, nationally televised games, the last game at the old Yankee Stadium, and playoff games) and on several occasions prior to games involving the National Hockey League's Buffalo Sabres including a performance before 71,217 fans at the AMP Energy NHL Winter Classic along with Sabres anthem singer Doug Allen, who performed the Canadian national anthem, on 1 January 2008, when the Sabres played the Pittsburgh Penguins. Tynan has not performed for the Sabres since Terrence Pegula purchased the team in 2011. Most recently, he sang Eagles Wings at the 2017 Memorial Day Concert.

In 2004 he sang Theme from New York, New York at the Belmont Stakes where Smarty Jones failed in his attempt to win the Triple Crown. and less than a week later he was at the Washington National Cathedral for former United States President Ronald Reagan's state funeral, where he sang "Amazing Grace" and Franz Schubert's "Ave Maria".

Tynan sang for George H. W. Bush at Bush's Houston home on the day of the president's death on 30 November 2018. The first song was "Silent Night", while the second was a Gaelic song. Bush's friend and former aide James Baker said that while Tynan was singing "Silent Night", "[b]elieve it or not, the president was mouthing the words."

=== "As long as they're not Jewish" controversy ===
While a real estate agent and prospective buyer Dr. Gabrielle Gold-von Simson were looking at an apartment in Tynan's building on Manhattan's East Side, Tynan made what was construed to be an antisemitic remark. Shortly after this, the Yankees cancelled Tynan's performance of "God Bless America" for Game 1 of the 2009 American League Championship Series on 16 October 2009 because of the incident.

According to Tynan's version of the event, two Jewish women came to view an apartment in his building. Some time afterwards, another real estate agent showed up with a potential client. The agent joked to Tynan "at least they're not (Boston) Red Sox fans". "As long as they're not Jewish," Tynan replied, referring to the exacting women he had met earlier. The prospective client, Jewish paediatrician Dr. Gabrielle Gold-Von Simson, took umbrage and said: "Why would you say that?" Tynan replied: "That would be scary", and laughed, referring to the previous incident. Tynan subsequently apologised for his remark. The Anti-Defamation League accepted his apology. Tynan performed at an ADL event in Manhattan soon thereafter.

Only 4 July 2010 Tynan performed "God Bless America" for the Boston Red Sox at Fenway Park with the support of some in the local Jewish community.
