= Gay Byrne =

Irish television and radio presenter (1934–2019)

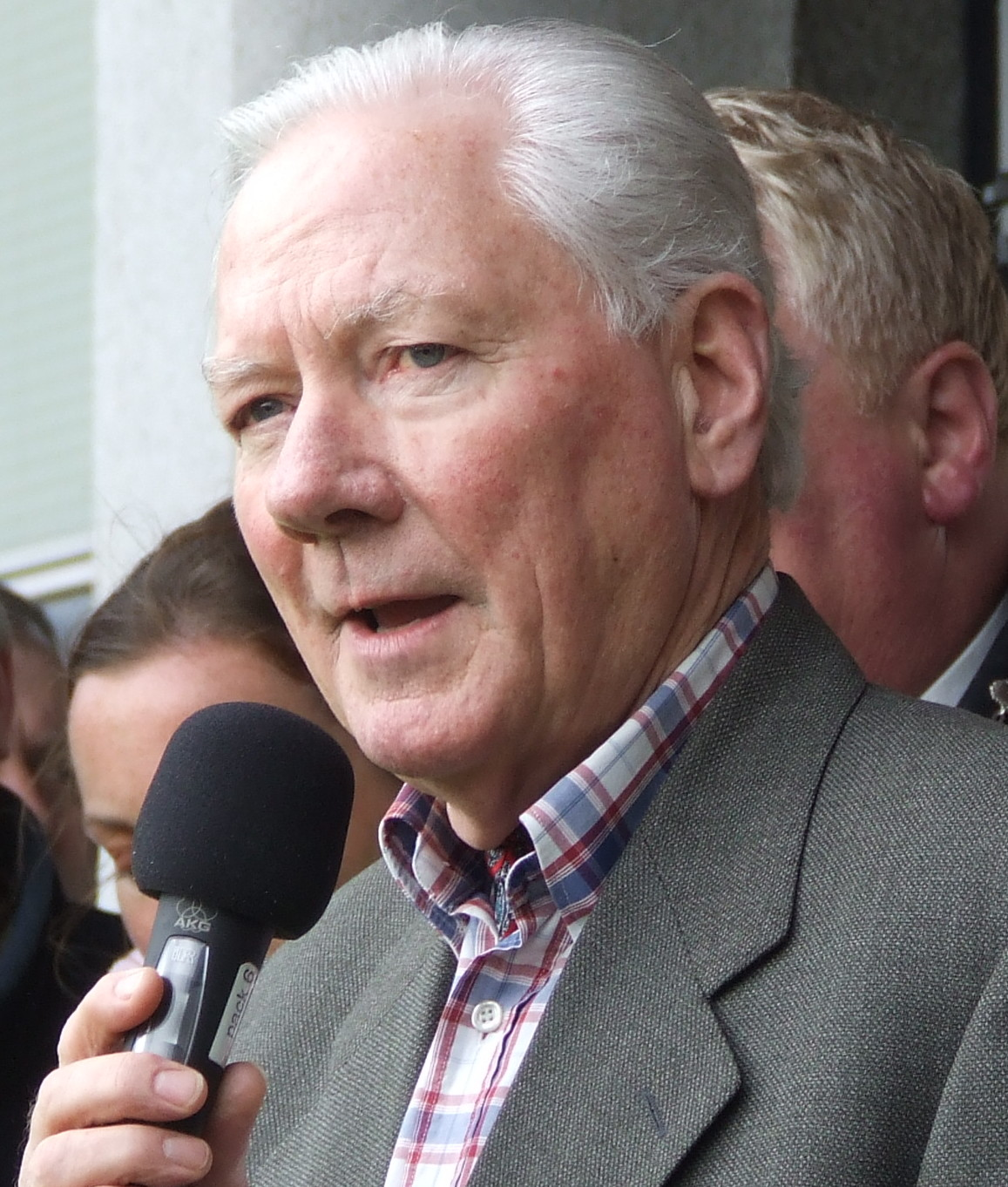
- Byrne in 2007
- Born: Gabriel Mary Byrne; 5 August 1934; Rialto, Dublin, Ireland
- Died: 4 November 2019 (aged 85); Howth, Dublin, Ireland
- Resting place: St. Fintan's Cemetery, Sutton, Dublin, Ireland
- Other names: Uncle Gay; Gaybo; Uncle Gaybo
- Education: Scoil Treasa Naofa; Synge Street CBS honorary doctorate in literature from Trinity College Dublin (1988)
- Occupation: Broadcaster
- Years active: 1958–2019
- Employer: Raidió Teilifís Éireann (RTÉ)
- Notable work: The Late Late Show; The Late Late Toy Show; The Gay Byrne Show; Rose of Tralee; People in Need Telethon; Who Wants to Be a Millionaire?; The Meaning of Life; For One Night Only
- Board member of: Chairman of the Road Safety Authority (2006–2014)
- Spouse: Kathleen Watkins (m. 1964)
- Children: 2

Gabriel Mary Byrne (5 August 1934 – 4 November 2019) was an Irish presenter and host of radio and television. His most notable role was as the first host of The Late Late Show over a 37-year period spanning 1962 until 1999. The Late Late Show is the world's longest-running live chat show. He was affectionately known as "Uncle Gay", "Gaybo" or "Uncle Gaybo".

From 1973 until 1998, Byrne presented The Gay Byrne Hour – later The Gay Byrne Show when it expanded to two hours – on RTÉ Radio 1 each weekday morning. After retiring from his long-running radio and television shows, Byrne presented several other programmes, including Who Wants to Be a Millionaire?, The Meaning of Life and For One Night Only on RTÉ One and Sunday Serenade/Sunday with Gay Byrne on RTÉ lyric fm. In 2006, he was elected Chairman of Ireland's Road Safety Authority. In his retirement he was described as the "Elder Lemon of Irish broadcasting".

In 2010, The Irish Times said Byrne was "unquestionably the most influential radio and television man in the history of the Irish State". He was approached to run in the 2011 Irish presidential election but declined to run, despite topping early opinion polls.

== Early life ==
Byrne was the son of Edward Byrne, who joined the Irish Volunteers in 1912. In 1913, Edward Byrne enlisted as a professional trooper with the British Army's 19th (Queen Alexandra's Own Royal) Hussars cavalry regiment, given a background as a horseman from his father's employment by the Earl of Meath as a coachman in County Wicklow. On the outbreak of World War I he was mobilised and went with his unit to the Western Front, where he took part in heavy fighting in the Ypres Salient and at the Battle of the Somme. He was discharged from the British Army at the war's end in 1919. He later took part in the Irish War of Independence.

In the early 1920s, Edward Byrne was employed by Guinness' St. James's Gate Brewery, where he worked for most of the rest of his life on the barges that operated on the River Liffey, transporting wooden casks from St. James's Gate Brewery to sea ships at the North Wall in Dublin. Byrne's father, Edward, married his mother, Annie, in 1917, when briefly home on leave from the war. The two had met near Bray just before the war began. Both of them were from County Wicklow. His siblings were Ray, Al, Ernest and Mary; all but Mary predeceased him.

Byrne was born on 5 August 1934 and grew up in The Liberties in Dublin. He first lived with his family at 17 Rialto Street, Rialto, Dublin, before his parents moved to 124 (later renumbered 512) South Circular Road, Dublin, in 1944. Byrne's mother, Annie, died in late 1964.

Byrne attended Rialto National School (since closed) and several other schools for short periods. Subsequently, he was educated by the Irish Christian Brothers at Synge Street CBS. He and two classmates bought a jazz record when Byrne was fourteen years old in January 1948, at a time when Radio Éireann refused to play it because of its "licentious" content. In December 2009, Byrne returned to his old primary school on Synge Street to launch an online children's book club, and read an extract from Marita Conlon-McKenna's storybook In Deep Dark Wood. In 2009, whilst celebrating the 250th anniversary of Guinness, he revealed that he had once tried unsuccessfully to earn a job in the brewery near his childhood home.

When he was young, Byrne was inspired by the broadcaster Eamonn Andrews, who had a successful career on British television, and "wanted to be what he was". Andrews was friendly with Byrne's eldest brother.

== Radio career ==
Byrne began his broadcasting career on radio in 1958. State broadcaster Radio Éireann (now RTÉ) gave him a 15-minute slot on Monday nights which he used to play Jazz recordings, his first broadcast for the station being in 1958.

He is now best remembered for his two-hour morning show, The Gay Byrne Hour, which was later renamed The Gay Byrne Show (1972–1999). For many years the show was produced by John Caden. Joe Duffy was a reporter and occasional co-presenter on The Gay Byrne Show.

Byrne featured on radio occasionally after retiring from The Gay Byrne Show – in 2006, he began presenting a weekly Sunday afternoon show entitled Sunday Serenade on RTÉ lyric fm. After 2010, he could be heard playing jazz on Sunday afternoons on lyric fm. This two-hour show began after an encounter with Head of Lyric FM Aodán Ó Dubhghaill at the National Concert Hall. Sunday with Gay Byrne attracted 55,000 listeners through "word of mouth": no advertising and no mention in the RTÉ Guide. The show was broadcast weekly approximately from September to March, with a break during the intervening six months. Byrne once commented on the emptiness of RTÉ at this time of the week:

As soon as Marian finishes at one [o' clock], there is a clear-out. There are a couple of fellas down the corridor doing sport, and that is about it. You have the place to yourself and it is wonderful".

== Television ==
=== The Late Late Show ===
"Anonymous, private people to whom something extraordinary had happened whether it was falling out of an aeroplane or escaping from a burning building or a sinking ship and who had the capacity to tell the story and that was always a sure-fire recipe for arresting people's attention."

— Byrne on the effect ordinary people had when appearing on The Late Late Show.

On 5 July 1962, the first episode of The Late Late Show aired, after Radio Éireann established a television service the previous year. Originally the show was scheduled as an eight-week summer filler.

Initially, Byrne continued to work for other broadcasters, including Granada Television and the BBC in the UK. At Granada, Byrne became the first person to introduce the Beatles on television when they made their small-screen debut on a local news programme People and Places. According to Byrne, Paul McCartney later asked him to be the Beatles' agent during a sound check for his show but he declined the offer. After 1969, Byrne worked exclusively for the Irish state broadcaster.

The Late Late Show, which is still broadcast, has become the world's second longest-running chat show. The show became a forum where controversial topics such as the influence of the Roman Catholic Church, contraception, AIDS, unemployment, homosexuality, abortion, divorce and other hitherto taboo subjects were discussed openly in Ireland, alongside book reviews, celebrity visits, and music acts such as the Boomtown Rats, U2, Sinéad O'Connor, Elkie Brooks, Boyzone and Noel Gallagher. Other guests included Presidents of Ireland, successive Archbishops of Armagh, minor members of the British royal family, politicians, actors and authors. The show had a significant influence on Irish society. Politician Oliver J. Flanagan claimed that "there was no sex in Ireland until Teilifís Éireann went on the air". Bishop of Galway Michael Browne called him "a purveyor of filth" after he asked a woman what colour nightie she wore on her wedding night and she had replied that she believed she'd worn nothing.

More than a decade after departing his role as host of The Late Late Show Byrne is remembered for conducting memorable interviews with former politician Pádraig Flynn and then Bishop of Galway Eamon Casey's lover Annie Murphy, among others. Another memorable moment to occur on The Late Late Show was when he called the winner of a prize car live on air only to discover the woman's daughter had died since she had entered.

During the early years of Byrne's time hosting The Late Late Show, prior to about 1978 when the second national Irish TV channel was launched, he was employed by RTÉ on a continuously renewing 3-month contract, lest his employer might want to fire him any time they choose.

Byrne and The Late Late Show were central to the development of the careers of figures such as Mary Coughlan.

He was noted for wearing a "Bing Crosby sweater" when presenting The Late Late Toy Show.

On 21 May 1999, Byrne presented his last edition of The Late Late Show. He was presented with a Harley-Davidson motorcycle by Bono and Larry Mullen, Jr. Pat Kenny succeeded Byrne as presenter in September 1999, subsequently succeeded by Ryan Tubridy in September 2009. Byrne gave Tubridy his blessing upon taking over the role, saying: "He has all the qualities required, the light deft touch together with a serious mind. I think it's a great adventure that he's setting off on". Byrne returned to The Late Late Show as a guest twice during Tubridy's first season as the presenter, the latter appearance on the day of Gerry Ryan's death.

=== The Meaning of Life ===
In April 2009, RTÉ One began broadcasting a series called The Meaning of Life, during which Gay Byrne interviewed public figures about issues of meaning and life. He preferred not to discuss his own faith:

I am not going to say, because it would compromise me in terms of the show if people knew I had a position. What you find is that they are all searching. No one has the truth.

The programme has contained a number of significant moments, including actor Gabriel Byrne's admission that he had been abused as a child at the start of the second series and Stephen Fry's denunciation of God during the tenth series.

=== Other television work ===
In the 1960s, Byrne presented Let's Dance for Granada Television with popular singing star Marion Ryan. The programme was filmed in the Ballroom at Belle Vue, Manchester and also featured original Come Dancing stars Syd Perkin and Edna Duffield.

Byrne compèred the finals of the Castlebar Song Contest in 1966 and 1967. He also presented the Rose of Tralee festival for 17 years until 1994. Between 1989 and 2001, Byrne hosted the RTÉ People in Need Telethon several times.

After "retiring", Byrne hosted the Irish version of Who Wants to Be a Millionaire?. He also hosted The Gay Byrne Music Show and Make 'Em Laugh, a series about comedy in Ireland, Gaybo's Grumpy Men and Class Reunion. Class Reunion, which was broadcast on RTÉ One in 2005, was compared by some sources to This Is Your Life and featured special guests who were reunited with former classmates to recount stories from their schooldays. Guests on the show included Adi Roche and Pat Spillane.

In the summer season of 2000, Byrne hosted The Gay Byrne Music Show, which was a studio-based show aired on Saturday nights as a summer filler between 8 July and 19 August 2000 and showcased all genres of music in the company of the RTÉ Concert Orchestra. From 2011, he presented more summer filler light entertainment in the form of For One Night Only.

== Later career ==
Byrne did not completely retire and continued to feature occasionally on radio and television after leaving The Late Late Show and The Gay Byrne Show. He launched Joe Duffy's autobiography Just Joe in Harry's Bar in October 2011.

In March 2006, Byrne was appointed as the chairman of the Irish Road Safety Authority, a public body given the task of improving road safety in the Republic of Ireland. The role saw him visit hospitalised survivors alongside President of Ireland Mary McAleese.

=== Politics ===
==== Views ====
In 2010, Byrne asked then-Taoiseach Brian Cowen and "whether you can be Taoiseach and still sit up and have a pint in the local pub. You have to dignify the office". In later years he became known for his anti-EU stance. Bookmakers suggested Byrne might become Mayor of Dublin.

==== 2011 presidential election ====
In August 2011, Byrne was approached by Fianna Fáil as a possible nominee for that year's presidential election. The media advised Byrne, who had enjoyed an avuncular relationship with the public as a performer over many decades, against such a move. An editorial in the Irish Independent said: "This isn't some sort of a reality TV show but a contest for the highest office in the land." The Irish Times queried the distinction between Byrne as a performer versus Byrne as an individual. "But who is it that the Irish people really love? Is it Gaybo or Gabriel Byrne? Given they don't really know the man himself – a man who has retained his privacy throughout a lifetime of fame – the love is surely for the persona rather than the person." Byrne topped polls as the candidate people were most likely to vote for.

On 13 August 2011, Byrne announced that he would not be a candidate for the Presidency. Appearing later on TV3's Midweek programme he called Martin McGuinness, who was contesting the election as a representative of Sinn Féin, a "liar".

Byrne performed a one-man show in front of a sold-out audience at the Gate Theatre on 18 September 2011. The performance was part of a benefit night to raise funds for the Irish Cancer Society. British Ambassador Julian King and Senator David Norris were among those in attendance.

== Personal life ==
Byrne was married to Kathleen Watkins, formerly a well-known harpist. Watkins was also the first continuity announcer to appear on-screen on the opening night of Telefís Éireann on New Year's Eve in 1961. Byrne first met Watkins, a native of Saggart, County Dublin, in 1957. They married in Saggart Catholic church in 1964. The couple had two daughters, Suzy and Crona. The Byrne family lived on Howth Head in Dublin and in later years in Sandymount in Dublin. Byrne became a grandfather on 15 September 2004.

Byrne relied on an accountant friend, Russell Murphy, to manage his finances, and was personally distraught when upon Murphy's death in 1986, it was found that most of his savings had been squandered, and this had been hidden from him.

Byrne was a longtime jazz enthusiast, and hosted a jazz radio show in the later years of his career.

He was a qualified private pilot.

=== Health ===
In later years, Byrne revealed he had hearing loss in one ear. He thought originally that it was due to working in the television and radio industry for over 50 years that caused his hearing loss, but later found out it was genetic as his mother, his sister and three brothers all had hearing problems.

In 2011, Byrne was admitted to St Vincent's Hospital, complaining that his lungs felt as if they were "made of concrete" and there was "nothing going in" and that he expected to die. In 2015, after spending Christmas at home with his family, he suffered a heart attack.

On 20 November 2016, he revealed live on his Time Warp radio broadcast on RTÉ Lyric FM that he was to begin treatment for prostate cancer, and that the cancer might have also spread to his lower back. He told listeners he would be taking a one-week break before returning to work. However, he did not return to the air. Byrne had been quoted by the Irish Mirror saying that "Ideally, I would like to get back to doing my Sunday afternoon radio show on Lyric FM, but my wife and daughters tell me I'm not ready and won't let me do it."

=== Death ===
Byrne died on 4 November 2019 at his home in Howth, aged 85, from prostate cancer. On 5 November 2019, a special live edition of The Late Late Show was broadcast on RTÉ One, with various tributes made to him.

His funeral took place on 8 November 2019 at St Mary's Pro-Cathedral in Dublin and was shown live on RTÉ. After the mass, the hearse carrying Byrne's body made its way back to Howth and was greeted by fans along the route. He was laid to rest, privately, at Saint Fintans Cemetery, Sutton.

== Honours and awards ==
- In 1988, Byrne was awarded an honorary doctorate in letters from Trinity College Dublin.
- In 1999 he was granted the Freedom of the City of Dublin.
- He received a Lifetime Achievement Award in February 2007 from Irish Film and Television Network.
- He holds the record for the greatest number of Jacob's Awards received, winning a total of six for his radio and television work.
- He was appointed chairman of the Road Safety Authority in Ireland in 2006.
- Outstanding Achievement PPI Radio Award (2009) "The only surprise is that it has taken so long for Gaybo to get it".
- Marking RTÉ's 50th anniversary in 2011, Byrne appeared on a postage stamp, part of a set of three that also featured Anne Doyle and Emma O'Driscoll.
- A wax figure of Gay Byrne has been put on public display at Wax Museum Plus on Dublin's College Green.

== Legacy ==
Credited with being a catalyst in the transformation of Irish society since the 1960s, Byrne broke several societal taboos by engaging in discourse on subjects like contraception, homosexuality, and abortion. When Barry Galvin—then Cork city's state solicitor—guested with Byrne on The Late Late Show in 1992 to discuss Ireland's mounting problems with the illegal drug trade, he was subsequently given the post of first-ever head of the Criminal Assets Bureau.

Byrne was frequently described as among the most famous or the most famous figures in Irish broadcasting history. Ryle Dwyer, writing in the Irish Examiner, said Byrne "had more influence on changing life in this country than any of the political leaders". Respondents to a 1998 poll named Byrne both the most hated public figure in Ireland (tied with former Taoiseach Charles Haughey) and the most popular.

== Bibliography ==
- Byrne, Gay. To Whom It Concerns (1972)
- Byrne, Gay; Purcell, Deirdre. The Time of My Life: An Autobiography (Gill & Macmillan, Dublin; 1989) ISBN 0-7171-1615-8

== See also ==
- List of people on the postage stamps of Ireland

Media offices
Preceded by -----	Host of The Late Late Show; 1962–1964	Succeeded by Frank Hall
Preceded by Frank Hall	Host of The Late Late Show; 1964–1999	Succeeded by Pat Kenny
Preceded by Brendan O'Reilly	Eurovision Song Contest Ireland Commentator; 1969	Succeeded by Valerie McGovern
Preceded by N/A	Host of The Rose of Tralee; 1978–1994	Succeeded by Derek Davis
Preceded by Terry Wogan	Eurovision Song Contest Ireland Commentator; 1984	Succeeded by Linda Martin
