= Veronica Dunne (soprano) =

Irish opera singer and singing teacher (1927–2021)

- Born: 2 August 1927; Dublin, Ireland
- Died: 5 April 2021 (aged 93); Dublin, Ireland
- Occupations: Operatic soprano; Voice teacher
- Organizations: Dublin Grand Opera Society; Royal Opera House; Dublin College of Music; Leinster School of Music; Royal Irish Academy of Music; Veronica Dunne International Singing Competition
- Children: 2
- Awards: National Concert Hall Lifetime Achievement Award

Veronica Dunne (2 August 1927 – 5 April 2021), also known as Ronnie Dunne, was an Irish operatic soprano and voice teacher who was described as "an Irish national treasure". After a successful operatic career at the Dublin Opera and the Royal Opera House in London, she focused on voice teaching in Dublin, where she trained future international singers. The triennial Veronica Dunne International Singing Competition was established in 1995. She received the National Concert Hall Lifetime Achievement Award in 2014.

== Early life ==
Dunne was born in Dublin on 20 August 1927. She was the youngest of three children of a well-to-do family. Her father worked as a master builder whose construction firm built the church in Foxrock in the early 1930s. Dunne began singing when she was 11 years old. She studied initially in Dublin with Hubert Rooney. She then sold her pony for £125 in order to fund her dream of studying music in Italy. She went to Rome in 1946 to study with Soldini Calcagni and Francesco Calcatelli. Her family met with Sarsfield Hogan, the secretary of the Department of Finance at the time, to discuss the issue of her monthly allowance, which would have breached foreign exchange controls. Sarsfield permitted her to receive the money on the condition that she return to Ireland in the future and teach her young compatriots to sing.

== Career ==
Dunne made her operatic debut in Dublin in 1948 as Micaëla in Bizet's Carmen with the Dublin Grand Opera Society, and appeared there in 1949 as Marguerite in Gounod's Faust. She won the Concorso Lirico Milano in 1952, which brought her the role of Mimì in Leoncavallo's La bohème at the Teatro Nuovo in Milan, which in turn brought her a contract from the Royal Opera House in London, where she first appeared as Sophie in Der Rosenkavalier by Richard Strauss. She performed at the house alongside Joan Sutherland and Kathleen Ferrier. In 1958, she appeared as Blanche in the first performance at the house of Poulenc's Dialogues of the Carmelites. She also performed with Welsh National Opera, Scottish Opera, and Wexford Festival Opera. She returned to the stage in 2002 to appear as Countess in Tchaikovsky's Pique Dame at the Gaiety Theatre in Dublin.

Dunne gave a number of world premieres of works by contemporary Irish composers including Never to Have Lived is Best (1965) by Seóirse Bodley, as well as Irish Songs (1971) and The Táin (1970) by James Wilson.

Dunne was appointed a vocal teacher at the then Dublin College of Music (today Technical University Conservatory of Music and Drama) in 1962. She was awarded an honorific doctorate in 1987. She retired in 1992, but continuing to teach at the Leinster School of Music and the Royal Irish Academy of Music. Dunne's students included Patricia Bardon, Orla Boylan, Mary Brennan, Tara Erraught, Lynda Lee, Colette McGahon, Anthony Kearns, Suzanne Murphy, and Finbar Wright, who have all sung in the major international opera houses. In 2014, aged 87, she continued to teach 39 hours a week.

The triennial Veronica Dunne International Singing Competition, established by the Friends of the Vocal Arts in Ireland in 1995, awards bursaries in her name. Recipients have included Orla Boylan, Sarah-Jane Brandon, Tara Erraught, Pumeza Matshikiza and Simon O'Neill. Dunne received the National Concert Hall Lifetime Achievement Award in 2014.

== Personal life ==
Dunne married Peter McCarthy in 1953; the couple had two children.

Dunne died at the age of 93, announced on 5 April 2021. Irish President Michael D. Higgins paid tribute to Dunne, saying that she "captivated millions with her singing" and adding, "The legacy she leaves lies in the talents of those scores of others whose talents and performances she unlocked with her enthusiasm, energy and commitment as a teacher and friend."
