= 1988 in Irish television =

The following is a list of events relating to television in Ireland from 1988.

== Events ==
- 30 April – Ireland hosts the Eurovision Song Contest from the RDS Simmonscourt Pavilion, Dublin, after winning it the previous year. Pat Kenny and Michelle Rocca host the 33rd annual contest, which is won by Switzerland, with the song "Ne partez pas sans moi" (Don't Leave Without Me), sung by a 20-year-old Celine Dion. The Irish entry, "Take Him Home", by the band Jump the Gun, ends in eighth place.
- 3 July – The Broadcasting and Wireless Telegraphy Act, legislation concerning licensing for broadcasting, comes into law.
- September – RTÉ 2 is rebranded as Network 2 as part of a major overhaul of the channel.
- 3 October – Australian soap Home and Away receives its Irish television debut on Network 2. On the same day, a new-look RTÉ Weather is launched.

== Debuts ==
=== RTÉ 1 ===
- 4 March – (United Kingdom) / (United States) A Little Princess (1986)
- 7 April – (Wales) Fireman Sam (1987–present)
- 8 April – (United Kingdom) The Gemini Factor (1987)
- 10 June – (United Kingdom) The Secret World of Polly Flint (1987)
- 11 June – (Canada) / (Belgium) Ovide Video (1987–1988)
- 5 July – (United Kingdom) Chocky's Challenge (1986)
- 13 July – (Australia) Kaboodle (1987–1990)
- 6 August – (Canada) The Raccoons (1985–1991)
- 15 October – Kenny Live (1988–1999)
- Undated – (United States) DuckTales (1987–1990)
- Bibi (1988-1994)

=== Network 2 ===
- 1 May – (United States) Jim Henson Presents the World of Puppetry (1985)
- September – Jo Maxi (1988–1993)
- 3 October – (Australia) Home and Away (1988–present)
- 6 October – (Canada) / (United States) The Care Bears Family (1986–1988)
- 6 October – (France) / (Japan) / (Switzerland) / (Italy) Once Upon a Time... Life (1987)
- 6 October – The Floradora Folk (1988–1989)
- 11 October – Nighthawks (1988–1992)
- 28 October – (United Kingdom) T-Bag (1985–1992)
- 1 December – (France) / (Japan) The Mysterious Cities of Gold (1982–1983)
- Undated – (United States) The Tracey Ullman Show (1987–1990)
- Undated – (United Kingdom) The Storyteller (1987–1988)
- Undated - (United States) Full House (1987-1995)

== Endings ==
=== RTÉ 1 ===
- 29 April - Evening Extra (1986-1988)

== Changes of network affiliation ==
Shows	Moved from	Moved to
(Wales) SuperTed	RTÉ One	Network 2
(Canada) / (Scotland) The Campbells	RTÉ One	Network 2
(United States) Alvin and the Chipmunks (Ruby Spears version)	Network 2	RTÉ One
(United States) Muppet Babies	RTÉ One	Network 2
Dempsey's Den	RTÉ One	Network 2
Bosco	RTÉ One	Network 2
(United States) The Wuzzles	RTÉ One	Network 2
(United States) / (Australia) The Berenstain Bears	RTÉ One	Network 2
(United States) ALF	RTÉ One	Network 2

== Ongoing television programmes ==
=== 1960s ===
- RTÉ News: Nine O'Clock (1961–present)
- RTÉ News: Six One (1962–present)
- The Late Late Show (1962–present)

=== 1970s ===
- Sports Stadium (1973–1997)
- The Late Late Toy Show (1975–present)
- RTÉ News on Two (1978–2014)
- Bosco (1979–1996)
- The Sunday Game (1979–present)

=== 1980s ===
- Today Tonight (1982–1992)
- Mailbag (1982–1996)
- Glenroe (1983–2001)
- Rapid Roulette (1986–1990)
- Live at 3 (1986–1997)
- Saturday Live (1986–1999)
- Questions and Answers (1986–2009)
- Dempsey's Den (1986–2010)
- Marketplace (1987–1996)
- Where in the World? (1987–1996)
- Know Your Sport (1987–1998)

== See also ==
- 1988 in Ireland
