= List of The Late Late Show episodes =

This is a list of episodes of The Late Late Show.

== 2000s ==
=== 2008–2009 ===
| No. | Original release date | Guest(s) | Musical/entertainment guest(s) |
|---|---|---|---|
| 1 | 5 September 2008 | Olympic boxing medalists Kenny Egan, Darren Sutherland and Paddy Barnes | Sharon Shannon and Jerry Fish |
An external broadcast live from the Wexford Opera House
| 2 | 12 September 2008 | Trinny and Susannah | Mick Flannery |
| 3 | 19 September 2008 | Paralympics gold medalists and performance director (Jason Smyth, Michael McKillop and Liam Harbison) | The Script |
| 4 | 26 September 2008 | Kathryn Thomas | Boyzone |
| 5 | 3 October 2008 | Sonia O'Sullivan | Katherine Lynch, Tracy Piggott, Mary O'Rourke and Brian Kerr "Run for Africa" on a treadmill |
| 6 | 10 October 2008 | Cecelia Ahern | Mary Coughlan |
| 7 | 17 October 2008 | Michael Parkinson | Duke Special |
| 8 | 24 October 2008 | Tony Curtis | Snow Patrol |
Presented by Gerry Ryan in the absence of Pat Kenny
| 9 | 31 October 2008 | Myleene Klass | The Saw Doctors |
| 10 | 7 November 2008 | Lindsay Wagner | Hardy Drew and the Nancy Boys |
| 11 | 14 November 2008 | Paul O'Grady | Tom Jones |
| 12 | 21 November 2008 | Kelly O'Neill and Shane Curry | Kíla |
At the end of this episode Pat Kenny produced two tickets for the following week's show and tore them to pieces in the presence of Amazon explorer Charles Bird.
| 13 | 28 November 2008 | Nicky Byrne | McFly |
The Late Late Toy Show
| 14 | 5 December 2008 | Michael O'Leary | Pat Shortt |
| 15 | 12 December 2008 | Celebrities on Ice (Lisa Murphy, Shane Byrne, Patricia McKenna and Brian Ormond) | The Dubliners and Damien Dempsey |
| 16 | 19 December 2008 | Boyzone | Boyzone |
Mainly but not officially a Boyzone special
| 17 | 9 January 2009 | TBA | TBA |
Mainly but not officially a Boyzone special
| 18 | 16 January 2009 | TBA | TBA |
| 19 | 23 January 2009 | TBA | TBA |
| 20 | 30 January 2009 | TBA | TBA |
| 21 | 6 February 2009 | TBA | TBA |
| 22 | 13 February 2009 | TBA | TBA |
| 23 | 20 February 2009 | TBA | TBA |
Eurosong special
| 24 | 27 February 2009 | TBA | TBA |
| 25 | 6 March 2009 | TBA | TBA |
| 26 | 13 March 2009 | TBA | TBA |
| 27 | 20 March 2009 | TBA | TBA |
| 28 | 27 March 2009 | TBA | TBA |
Pat quit
| 29 | 3 April 2009 | TBA | TBA |
| 30 | 17 April 2009 | TBA | TBA |
| 31 | 24 April 2009 | TBA | TBA |
| 32 | 1 May 2009 | TBA | TBA |
| 33 | 8 May 2009 | TBA | TBA |
| 34 | 15 May 2009 | TBA | TBA |
| 35 | 22 May 2009 | TBA | TBA |
| 36 | 29 May 2009 | TBA | TBA |

=== 2009–2010 ===
| No. | Original release date | Guest(s) | Musical/entertainment guest(s) |
|---|---|---|---|
| 1^{b} | 4 September 2009 | Brian Cowen | Sharon Corr |
| 2^{c} | 11 September 2009 | Kilkenny senior hurling team | Lumière |
| 3 | 18 September 2009 | The Nolans | The Nolans |
| 4 | 25 September 2009 | Linda and Tony Sutherland—parents of Olympic boxer Darren Sutherland | Paloma Faith |
| 5 | 2 October 2009 | Ant & Dec | Sharon Shannon |
| 6 | 9 October 2009 | Ozzy and Sharon Osbourne | The Magnets |
| 7 | 16 October 2009 | Vince Vaughn | Camilla |
| 8 | 23 October 2009 | Donal Óg Cusack | TBA |
| 9 | 30 October 2009 | Katie Price | TBA |
| 10 | 6 November 2009 | Gordon Ramsay | TBA |
| 11 | 13 November 2009 | Ronan Keating | TBA |
| 12 | 20 November 2009 | Rose Callaly | TBA |
| 13^{d} | 27 November 2009 | Various children | Westlife |
The Late Late Toy Show
| 14 | 4 December 2009 | Peter Andre | Christy Moore |
| 15 | 11 December 2009 | Hector Ó hEochagáin | Michael Bublé |
| 16 | 18 December 2009 | Miley Cyrus | Miley Cyrus |
| 17 | 27 December 2009 | Louis Walsh | TBA |
| 18 | 8 January 2010 | Charlene McKenna and Aisling O'Sullivan | Beardyman |
| 19 | 15 January 2010 | Brenda Blethyn | Queen + We Will Rock You (musical) |
| 20 | 22 January 2010 | Justin Lee Collins | TBA |
| 21 | 29 January 2010 | Benicio del Toro | Nik Kershaw |
Heather Mills's first Irish television interview for 15 years
| 22 | 5 February 2010 | Stephen Baldwin | The Saturdays |
| 23 | 12 February 2010 | Samuel L. Jackson | Dionne Warwick |
| 24 | 19 February 2010 | Colin Farrell and Neil Jordan | Corinne Bailey Rae |
| 25 | 26 February 2010 | Shane MacGowan and Victoria Mary Clarke | Eddi Reader |
| 26 | 5 March 2010 | Johnny Logan, Dana Rosemary Scallon, Michael Ball, Marty Whelan | TBA |
Eurosong special
| 27 | 12 March 2010 | Boyzone | Boyzone |
| 28 | 19 March 2010 | Tess Daly | Mumford & Sons |
| 29 | 26 March 2010 | John Joe (horologist from The Late Late Toy Show) | Paul Brady |
| 30 | 2 April 2010 | Sinéad O'Connor | Altan |
First Good Friday episode in 15 years
| 31 | 9 April 2010 | Martine McCutcheon | Scouting for Girls |
| 32 | 16 April 2010 | Seán Gallagher and Gavin Duffy (Dragons' Den) and four finalists from the Student Enterprise Awards | Heathers |
Heathers reached the top of the Irish Indie Chart following this appearance
| 33 | 23 April 2010 | Beverley Callard (Liz McDonald) | Zena Donnelly |
| 34 | 30 April 2010 | Stockard Channing | Marianne Faithfull |
This episode coincided with the date of the death of Gerry Ryan, who had presented one episode of this show two seasons previously
| 35 | 7 May 2010 | Jason Byrne | Joshua Radin |
| 36 | 14 May 2010 | Andrew Cowles | Niamh Kavanagh |
| 37 | 21 May 2010 | David Kelly | Crystal Swing |
| 38 | 28 May 2010 | Cast of Riverdance + Bill Whelan, Moya Doherty and John McColgan and Caprice Bourret | Crowded House |

== 2010s ==
=== 2010–2011 ===
| No. | Original release date | Guest(s) | Musical/entertainment guest(s) |
|---|---|---|---|
| 1 | 3 September 2010 | Tony Blair | Jedward |
| 2 | 10 September 2010 | The Script | The Script |
| 3 | 17 September 2010 | Mícheál Ó Muircheartaigh | N/A |
| 4 | 24 September 2010 | Tim Robbins | The Rogues Gallery Band |
| 5 | 1 October 2010 | Giovanni Trapattoni | O Emperor |
| 6 | 8 October 2010 | Una Healy and Declan Nerney | Una Healy and Declan Nerney |
| 7 | 15 October 2010 | Hector Ó hEochagáin | Singin' Bernie Walsh |
| 8 | 22 October 2010 | Nigella Lawson | Ronnie Wood |
| 9 | 29 October 2010 | Tom Jones | Tom Jones |
| 10 | 5 November 2010 | Michael Parkinson | N/A |
| 11 | 12 November 2010 | Dawn French | Two Door Cinema Club |
| 12 | 19 November 2010 | Dara Ó Briain | Shayne Ward |
| 13 | 26 November 2010 | Various children | McFly, Joe McElderry, The Strypes |
The Late Late Toy Show; television debut of The Strypes
| 14 | 3 December 2010 | Jack Black | Westlife |
| 15 | 10 December 2010 | Take That | Robbie Williams |
| 16 | 17 December 2010 | Mary Byrne | The Rubberbandits |
| 17 | 24 December 2010 | Robbie and Claudine Keane | Jimmy MacCarthy |
| 18 | 7 January 2011 | Brian Dennehy | Julian Lloyd Webber |
| 19 | 14 January 2011 | Kathryn Thomas and the five Operation Transformation leaders | The Coronas |
| 20 | 21 January 2011 | Discussion on the week's political upheaval that would later lead to the collapse of the government) | Clannad |
| 21 | 28 January 2011 | Bob Geldof | Bob Geldof |
| 22 | 4 February 2011 | Maura Tierney and Ardal O'Hanlon | Mary Coughlan |
| 23 | 11 February 2011 | N/A | Five musical acts |
Eurosong special
| 24 | 18 February 2011 | Thelma Madine | Ellie Goulding |
| 25 | 25 February 2011 | Maureen O'Hara | Wonderland |
| 26 | 4 March 2011 | Cast of The Commitments | Elbow |
| 27 | 11 March 2011 | Phil Lynott (in the year of her son's 25th anniversary) | Thin Lizzy |
| 28 | 18 March 2011 | Rory McIlroy | The JD Set |
| 29 | 25 March 2011 | Ireland cricket team | Buddy Greco |
| 30 | 1 April 2011 | Eamonn Holmes and wife Ruth Langsford | Villagers |
| 31 | 8 April 2011 | Charlie Bird | Jessie J |
| 32 | 15 April 2011 | Kevin Doyle, Sheamus | Josh Groban |
| 33 | 22 April 2011 | John Healy (The Restaurant) | Adrian Edmondson |
| 34 | 29 April 2011 | Jedward | Suede |
| 35 | 6 May 2011 | Seán Gallagher (on why he wants to run for President), Keith and Lisa Duffy (on their work with Irish Autism Action) | Crystal Swing |
| 36 | 13 May 2011 | Christian Louboutin | Mary Black |
| 37 | 20 May 2011 | John Bowman (on the life of Dr. Garret FitzGerald) | Andrea Corr |
| 38 | 27 May 2011 | Taoiseach Enda Kenny (on the visits of Queen Elizabeth II and Barack Obama) | Il Divo and Bell X1 with the RTÉ Concert Orchestra |
Neil Diamond's first ever Irish interview

=== 2011–2012 ===
| No. | Original release date | Guest(s) | Musical/entertainment guest(s) |
|---|---|---|---|
| 1 | 2 September 2011 | Conor Niland | Eleanor McEvoy |
| 2 | 9 September 2011 | Ronnie Whelan | N/A |
| 3 | 16 September 2011 | Paddy Doherty | The Saturdays |
| 4 | 23 September 2011 | Dublin senior football team | Joe McElderry |
| 5 | 30 September 2011 | Mike Murphy | Jedward |
First televised debate of the presidential election campaign
| 6 | 7 October 2011 | Dermot Bannon | Caro Emerald |
| 7 | 14 October 2011 | Cecelia Ahern | Tim Michin |
| 8 | 21 October 2011 | Danielle Ryan, Saoirse Ronan and Charlene McKenna | Ed Sheeran |
| 9 | 28 October 2011 | Katie Taylor | Florence and the Machine |
| 10 | 4 November 2011 | Westlife | Westlife |
Westlife's first interview since announcing their demise
| 11 | 11 November 2011 | PJ Gallagher and Dara Ó Briain | The Wanted |
| 12 | 18 November 2011 | Michael Bublé | Some of those interviewed? |
| 13 | 25 November 2011 | One Direction | One Direction |
| 14 | 2 December 2011 | Various children | TBA |
The Late Late Toy Show
| 15 | 9 December 2011 | Sinitta | Daniel O'Donnell |
| 16 | 16 December 2011 | The Rubberbandits | Charlotte Church |
| 17 | 23 December 2011 | Allen Leech | Ryan Sheridan |
| 18 | 6 January 2012 | TBA | TBA |
| 19 | 13 January 2012 | Keith and Jay Duffy | N/A |
| 20 | 20 January 2012 | Michael O'Leary | N/A |
| 21 | 27 January 2012 | Eamon Dunphy | Ashley Tubridy |
| 22 | 3 February 2012 | Corey Feldman | Bressie |
| 23 | 10 February 2012 | Michelle Heaton | Matt Cardle |
| 24 | 17 February 2012 | Noel Gallagher | Snow Patrol |
| 25 | 24 February 2012 | TBA | Jedward |
Eurosong special
| 26 | 2 March 2012 | Niall Quinn | Big Country |
| 27 | 9 March 2012 | Susan Boyle | The Wanted and trad group the Irish House Party perform "Glad You Came" together |
| 28 | 16 March 2012 | Mia Farrow | Sinéad O'Connor |
| 29 | 23 March 2012 | Natasha Giggs | N/A |
Giggs's first Irish television interview since the affair
| 30 | 30 March 2012 | Johnston, Mooney and O'Brien | Katie Melua |
| 31 | 6 April 2012 | Diarmuid Gavin | Keith Barry |
| 32 | 13 April 2012 | Bob Geldof | N/A |
| 33 | 20 April 2012 | Jonathan Ross | N/A |
Ross's first appearance on the show; McGrath's first appearance in 15 years
| 34 | 27 April 2012 | Steven Gerrard | Marina and the Diamonds |
| 35 | 4 May 2012 | Terry Pratchett RIP | Pat Byrne with Bressie |
| 36 | 11 May 2012 | Jedward | Some of those interviewed? |
| 37 | 18 May 2012 | Ryan O'Shaughnessy | Ryan O'Shaughnessy |
| 38 | 25 May 2012 | President Michael D. Higgins | Glen Hansard |
| 39 | 1 June 2012 | Gay Byrne | Sinéad O'Connor |
50th Anniversary Special

=== 2012–2013 ===
| No. | Original release date | Guest(s) | Musical/entertainment guest(s) |
|---|---|---|---|
| 1 | 7 September 2012 | TBA | TBA |
| 2 | 14 September 2012 | TBA | TBA |
| 3 | 21 September 2012 | TBA | TBA |
| 4 | 28 September 2012 | TBA | TBA |
| 5 | 5 October 2012 | TBA | TBA |
| 6 | 12 October 2012 | TBA | TBA |
| 7 | 19 October 2012 | TBA | TBA |
| 8 | 26 October 2012 | TBA | TBA |
| 9 | 2 November 2012 | TBA | TBA |
| 10 | 9 November 2012 | TBA | TBA |
| 11 | 16 November 2012 | TBA | TBA |
| 12 | 23 November 2012 | TBA | TBA |
| 13 | 30 November 2012 | TBA | TBA |
| 14 | 7 December 2012 | TBA | TBA |
| 15 | 14 December 2012 | TBA | TBA |
| 16 | 21 December 2012 | TBA | TBA |
| 17 | 4 January 2013 | TBA | TBA |
| 18 | 11 January 2013 | TBA | TBA |
| 19 | 18 January 2013 | TBA | TBA |
| 20 | 25 January 2013 | TBA | TBA |
| 21 | 1 February 2013 | TBA | TBA |
| 22 | 8 February 2013 | TBA | TBA |
| 23 | 15 February 2013 | TBA | TBA |
| 24 | 22 February 2013 | TBA | TBA |
| 25 | 1 March 2013 | TBA | TBA |
| 26 | 8 March 2013 | TBA | TBA |
| 27 | 15 March 2013 | TBA | TBA |
| 28 | 22 March 2013 | TBA | TBA |
| 29 | 29 March 2013 | TBA | TBA |
| 30 | 5 April 2013 | TBA | TBA |
| 31 | 12 April 2013 | TBA | TBA |
| 32 | 19 April 2013 | TBA | TBA |
| 33 | 26 April 2013 | TBA | TBA |
| 34 | 3 May 2013 | TBA | TBA |
| 35 | 10 May 2013 | TBA | TBA |
| 36 | 17 May 2013 | TBA | TBA |
| 37 | 24 May 2013 | TBA | TBA |
| 38 | 31 May 2013 | TBA | TBA |

=== 2013–2014 ===
| No. | Original release date | Guest(s) | Musical/entertainment guest(s) |
|---|---|---|---|
| 1 | 6 September 2013 | Bob Geldof | The Boomtown Rats |
Geldof also performed with The Boomtown Rats
| 2 | 13 September 2013 | Lucinda Creighton | Clannad |
| 3 | 20 September 2013 | Sinitta | The High Kings |
| 4 | 27 September 2013 | Joanne O'Riordan | Bell X1 |
| 5 | 4 October 2012 | Davy Fitzgerald, Shane O'Donnell and Patrick Donnellan | Nathan Carter |
| 6 | 11 October 2013 | Melanie McCabe | CÓRus |
| 7 | 18 October 2013 | Colin Farrell | Big September |
| 8 | 25 October 2013 | Kimberley Walsh | Jack L |
| 9 | 1 November 2013 | Shane Filan | Shane Filan |
| 10 | 8 November 2013 | Amanda Holden, John Delaney, Conor McGregor | Little Green Cars |
| 11 | 15 November 2013 | June Brown | Cliff Richard |
| 12 | 22 November 2013 | Finbar Furey, Helen Fielding, AP McCoy, Pat Shortt | Finbar Furey, Kodaline, Wet Wet Wet |
| 13 | 29 November 2013 | Various children | TBA |
The Late Late Toy Show
| 14 | 6 December 2013 | Gary Barlow | Gary Barlow, Shayne Ward with Foster and Allen |
| 15 | 13 December 2013 | Will Ferrell, Steve Carell, Paul Rudd and David Koechner | Chris Hadfield |
Interview with Ferrell, Carell, Rudd and Koechner pre-recorded earlier in the week during their visit for the European premiere of Anchorman 2: The Legend Continues
| 16 | 20 December 2013 | Una Healy | Wallis Bird and Sharon Shannon duet |
Two families were also reunited for Christmas
| 17 | 10 January 2014 | Kian Egan | Gregory Porter |
| 18 | 17 January 2014 | Davy Fitzgerald | James Vincent McMorrow |
| 19 | 24 January 2014 | Josh Hartnett | Michael Bolton |
| 20 | 31 January 2014 | Keith Barry | Mario Rosenstock's Garth Brooks mania sketch |
| 21 | 7 February 2014 | David Norris | Eddi Reader |
| 22 | 14 February 2014 | David Rawle | Robert Mizzell |
| 23 | 21 February 2014 | Richard Dreyfuss and Terry Gilliam | Corner Boy, Midge Ure, Keith Hanley |
| 24 | 28 February 2014 | Louis Walsh, Linda Martin, Eoghan McDermott, Maia Dunphy, Johnny Logan | Johnny Logan |
Eurosong special
| 25 | 7 March 2014 | Amy Huberman, Hugh O'Conor, Peter McDonald and Brian Gleeson | Judith Owen |
| 26 | 14 March 2014 | The family of the late Christine Buckley | Kian Egan |
| 27 | 21 March 2014 | Mike Ross | Raglans |
| 28 | 28 March 2014 | Brendan Gleeson, Killian Scott and John Michael McDonagh | Pixie Lott, The Riptide Movement, The Wolfe Tones |
| 29 | 4 April 2014 | Garda whistleblower John Wilson | Some of those interviewed? |
| 30 | 11 April 2014 | Linda Nolan | Hothouse Flowers |
Magee also performed charity single "These Old Eyes Have Seen It All"
| 31 | 18 April 2014 | Cathy Kelly | Lang Lang |
| 32 | 25 April 2014 | Michelle Heaton (on her health scares) | Something Happens |
| 33 | 2 May 2014 | Christy Moore | 300-person Riverdance performance |
| 34 | 9 May 2014 | Aengus Mac Grianna | Derek Ryan with Sharon Shannon, Mick Flannery |
| 35 | 16 May 2014 | Des Bishop | Emma Stevens |
| 36 | 23 May 2014 | Jonah Hill and Channing Tatum | Aslan |
| 37 | 30 May 2014 | Conor McGregor | HomeTown |

=== 2014–2015 ===
| No. | Original release date | Guest(s) | Musical/entertainment guest(s) |
|---|---|---|---|
| 1 | 5 September 2014 | Maria Walsh (2014 Rose of Tralee) | Interskalactic |
| 2 | 12 September 2014 | The Script | The Script |
| 3 | 19 September 2014 | Tom Vaughan-Lawlor | Sharon Corr |
| 4 | 26 September 2014 | Kelly McDonagh Mongan and family | Margo |
| 5 | 3 October 2014 | Ed Sheeran | Ed Sheeran |
| 6 | 10 October 2014 | Majella O'Donnell | The Riptide Movement |
| 7 | 17 October 2014 | Emily Ratajkowski | Mary Black |
| 8 | 24 October 2014 | Bono and The Edge | Bono and The Edge |
| 9 | 31 October 2014 | Brian O'Driscoll | Music from Grease |
| 10 | 7 November 2014 | Eva Longoria | Madness |
The Longoria interview was recorded in advance on 4 November
| 11 | 14 November 2014 | Saoirse Ronan | HomeTown |
| 12 | 21 November 2014 | Sinéad O'Connor | The Coronas |
| 13 | 28 November 2014 | Various children | TBA |
The Late Late Toy Show
| 14 | 5 December 2014 | Brendan O'Carroll and Jennifer Gibney | Olly Murs |
| 15 | 12 December 2014 | Brendan, Domhnall and Brian Gleeson | Imelda May |
| 16 | 19 December 2014 | Take That | Take That |
| 17 | 9 January 2015 | Michael O'Leary | Celtic Woman |
First episode using the new Late Late set
| 18 | 16 January 2015 | Stephanie Roche | Bay City Rollers |
| 19 | 23 January 2015 | Mikey North and Ian Puleston-Davies | TBA |
| 20 | 30 January 2015 | Donncha O'Callaghan | Mike Denver |
| 21 | 6 February 2015 | Nick Munier, John Walsh from Shebeen on Wheels, Vogue Williams, Kodaline, Maia Dunphy, Siobhan O'Connor, Moe Dunford and Terry McMahon, Father Pierre 'Jalapeno' Pepper | Kodaline |
| 22 | 13 February 2015 | Louis Walsh | James Bay, Altan |
Valentine's Day special
| 23 | 20 February 2015 | Marco Pierre White | The Shires and Dónal Lunny |
| 24 | 27 February 2015 | Phil Coulter, Mairead Farrell, Panti Bliss and Linda Martin | Phil Coulter and Niamh Kavanagh (performance of Coulter's song "Congratulations") |
Eurosong 2015 (Marty Whelan also featured and presented from backstage)
| 25 | 6 March 2015 | Mary Berry | The Overtones |
| 26 | 13 March 2015 | Ibrahim Halawa's sisters | The Kilfenora Céilí Band |
| 27 | 20 March 2015 | Maria Walsh (Rose of Tralee) and Adi Roche | Jersey Boys |
Russell Crowe also performed with the house band
| 28 | 27 March 2015 | Barry Cummins and Dearbhail McDonald | HomeTown |
| 29 | 3 April 2015 | Liam Cunningham | Paul Brady |
| 30 | 10 April 2015 | Jack Reynor and Gerard Barrett | Albert Hammond |
| 31 | 17 April 2015 | Michael Lyster | Charley Pride |
| 32 | 24 April 2015 | Killian Scott and Peter Coonan | Mamma Mia |
| 33 | 1 May 2015 | Jennifer Maguire and Darren Kennedy | The Three Degrees |
| 34 | 8 May 2015 | Jason Byrne | Don McLean |
| 35 | 15 May 2015 | Jim Sheridan | Once the Musical, Dublin |
| 36 | 22 May 2015 | RTÉ Washington correspondent Caitriona Perry | Nathan Carter |
| 37 | 29 May 2015 | Giles, Brady and Dunphy pay tribute to Bill O'Herlihy | Dancing, dancing and still more dancing |

=== 2015–2016 ===
| No. | Original release date | Guest(s) | Musical/entertainment guest(s) |
|---|---|---|---|
| 1 | 4 September 2015 | TBA | TBA |
| 2 | 11 September 2015 | TBA | TBA |
| 3 | 18 September 2015 | TBA | TBA |
| 4 | 25 September 2015 | TBA | TBA |
| 5 | 2 October 2015 | TBA | TBA |
| 6 | 9 October 2015 | TBA | TBA |
| 7 | 16 October 2015 | TBA | TBA |
| 8 | 23 October 2015 | TBA | TBA |
| 9 | 30 October 2015 | TBA | TBA |
| 10 | 6 November 2015 | TBA | TBA |
| 11 | 13 November 2015 | TBA | TBA |
| 12 | 20 November 2015 | TBA | TBA |
| 13 | 27 November 2015 | TBA | TBA |
The Late Late Toy Show
| 14 | 4 December 2015 | TBA | TBA |
| 15 | 11 December 2015 | TBA | TBA |
| 16 | 18 December 2015 | TBA | TBA |
| 17 | 8 January 2016 | TBA | TBA |
| 18 | 15 January 2016 | TBA | TBA |
| 19 | 22 January 2016 | TBA | TBA |
| 20 | 29 January 2016 | TBA | TBA |
| 21 | 5 February 2016 | TBA | TBA |
| 22 | 12 February 2016 | TBA | TBA |
| 23 | 19 February 2016 | TBA | TBA |
| 24 | 26 February 2016 | TBA | TBA |
| 25 | 4 March 2016 | TBA | TBA |
| 26 | 11 March 2016 | TBA | TBA |
| 27 | 18 March 2016 | TBA | TBA |
| 28 | 25 March 2016 | TBA | TBA |
| 29 | 1 April 2016 | TBA | TBA |
| 30 | 8 April 2016 | TBA | TBA |
| 31 | 15 April 2016 | TBA | TBA |
| 32 | 22 April 2016 | TBA | TBA |
| 33 | 29 April 2016 | TBA | TBA |
| 34 | 6 May 2016 | TBA | TBA |
| 35 | 13 May 2016 | TBA | TBA |
| 36 | 20 May 2016 | TBA | TBA |
| 37 | 27 May 2016 | TBA | TBA |
