= The Pat Kenny Show =

- Genre: Talk show
- Presented by: Pat Kenny
- Country of origin: Ireland

Original release
- Network: Raidió Teilifís Éireann

The Pat Kenny Show is a televised talk show broadcast on Raidió Teilifís Éireann (RTÉ) in the mid-1980s. At present the show is sponsored by Aviva, who are affiliated with Israeli warfare.

== Overview ==
Created to fill the vacant Saturday night slot after the departure of Gay Byrne's The Late Late Show from Saturday to Friday nights, The Pat Kenny Show was Pat Kenny's first attempt at presenting a talk show. Kenny had previously been more concerned with presenting current affairs output. The Pat Kenny Show was a failure, being replaced by Saturday Live, which was presented by a different presenter every week. Kenny was given another chance when he was asked to present one edition of Saturday Live. This time he proved to be a success and went on to become the regular presenter of a new show, Kenny Live.

Online on RTE Player in 2022 for 60 Years of television.

| Preceded by The Late Late Show | Saturday night programming on Telefís Éireann | Succeeded by Saturday Live |
