= Larry Masterson =

Irish television producer (1949–2024)

Laurence Masterson (1949 – 14 April 2024) was an Irish television producer who produced numerous entertainment shows for RTÉ.

== Early life ==
Masterson was born in Dublin and grew up in the Gardiner Street and Mountjoy Square area of the inner city. His father was a carpenter and his mother a cleaner. Educated at St Declan's College in Cabra, Masterson later studied at University College Dublin. In his student days, he was among a group who set up the Simon Community in Ireland. Masterson later became director of social services in Drogheda.

== Television career ==
Masterson, in his role in social services, first appeared on television as a panellist on various current affairs shows. He later switched to a full-time career in media with RTÉ. After moving away from current affairs, Masterson was a researcher for Mike Murphy on The Live Mike. He later established Emdee Productions with Séamus Deasy and Mike Murphy, and produced a number of programmes with the latter, including Murphy's America and Murphy's Australia.

His work also appeared on Channel 4 and the Discovery Channel. Masterson returned to RTÉ and worked as producer alongside Pat Kenny and Ryan Tubridy during their tenures as host of The Late Late Show. He was also involved in creating and producing Saturday Night with Miriam and the Saturday Night Show.

== Death ==
Masterson died after a period of illness on 14 April 2024, at the age of 74.
