= The Late Late Show owl =

Television show mascot

The famous old owl insignia from The Late Late Show, now no longer in use.

The Late Late Show owl is a motif that has been used by the world's longest-running chat show, The Late Late Show on RTÉ One television, since its inception in 1962. The owl symbol (a barn owl) is the only remaining theme from the classic format other than the show's name and the traditional annual ‘toy show’ edition. The first thing Ryan Tubridy said when announcing his plans for his takeover as host in August 2009 was: "I can tell you that the owl is not dead". Tubridy posed for photographs on the set holding a wooden owl.

Such is the nature of the owl theme, that RTÉ have used it in advertising campaigns for upcoming television shows. Halifax, a recent sponsor of the show, created its own giant owl mascot which was used to herald the show's arrival, ending and the in-between commercial breaks. It also ran competitions alluding to the famous owl theme, including one for primary schools, with the aim of building a shelter for the barn owl. A month afterwards, the winners, St. Patrick's Boys National School, were invited onto the show to discuss their design.

The mother of the singer Eva Cassidy was startled by the owl on her appearance on The Late Late Show and was heard by the show's researcher Will Hanafin to exclaim loudly: "What's that chicken doing flying there?".
