= Clíona Ní Bhuachalla =

Irish television producer and broadcaster

Clíona Ní Bhuachalla is an Irish television producer and broadcaster known for working on RTÉ Raidió na Gaeltachta.

Her producing career include Irish television series, Legend, Ros na Rún and The Clinic.

She has also appeared on Jo Maxi.

She presented the Irish heat, and provided television commentary for Eurovision Song Contest 1990.

Since 2000, ní Bhuachalla is a producer with the independent production company Icebox films.

Preceded by Michelle Rocca and Ronan Collins	Eurovision Song Contest Ireland Commentator (with Jimmy Greeley); 1990	Succeeded by Pat Kenny
