= Ronan Collins =

Irish broadcaster

- Born: 9 October 1952 (age 73); Dublin, Ireland
- Education: St. Vincent's C.B.S., Glasnevin
- Occupation: Broadcaster
- Employer: RTÈ Gold (2022-2025) RTÈ Radio 1 (1985--2022)
- Known for: The Ronan Collins Show
- Spouse: Woody Collins
- Children: 3

Ronan Collins (born 9 October 1952) is an Irish broadcaster from Glasnevin, Dublin. Up until 23 December 2022, Collins held the prestige of maintaining one of the longest-running radio shows on Ireland's national station, RTÉ Radio 1. At its peak, 250,000 listeners tuned in daily to The Ronan Collins Show between 12 pm - 1 pm, Monday - Friday. From 2022 to 2025 he had a daily programme on RTÈ Gold after leaving his regular show The Ronan Collins Show on RTE Radio One after many years as a regular on air presenter with RTÈ Radio One . His show on RTÉ Gold (2022–2025) was called The Collins Collection and aired weekdays from 10:00AM–1:00PM. The Collins Collection also sometimes aired on Bank Holidays on RTÈ Radio 1 in different timeslots from 2022 to 2025.

== Life and career ==
Collins started his show business career as a member of a showband playing drums.

He began his national radio career on RTÉ Radio 2, having worked on pirate radio prior to that. During his television career, he presented the celebrity game show Play the Game from 1984 to 1995. He also used to present Ireland's national lottery draw, and most recently A Little Bit Showband (2008–2009).

Collins has commentated on the Eurovision Song Contest for RTÉ One television.

He was a presenter as part of RTE's 1992 Barcelona Olympics coverage, shaving off his moustache when Ireland won a medal.

Ronan Collins left his daily lunchtime show at the end of 2022, to be replaced by Louise Duffy. He then presents a regular music show The Collins Collection on bank holidays on RTÈ Radio One and presented show from 2022 to 2025 for RTÉ Gold.

Collins took part in an episode of RTÈ One TV show Keys to My Life ( presented by Brendan Courtney ) in September 2025. Collins left RTÈ in December 2025 after 40 years.

Collins has been married to Woody since 1978, they have three children. In 2012, Collins was diagnosed with type 2 diabetes.

== Controversies ==
Collins controversially had free use of a Lexus (a luxury Toyota motor), supplied by Ben Dunne.

Collins once had a memorably famous row with Louis Walsh on Liveline. Collins described Six's debut single "There's a Whole Lot of Loving Going On" as "absolutely awful" and "lacking in credibility, imagination and musicianship". Walsh called Collins "a failed showband star" who played in "Mickey Mouse bands" and told him to "go and save the kids around the world".

Preceded by Mike Murphy	Eurovision Song Contest Ireland Commentator (with Michelle Rocca); 1989	Succeeded by Jimmy Greeley and Clíona Ní Bhuachalla
