= Shauna Lowry =

Irish television presenter (born 1970)

Shauna Lowry (born 6 July 1970) is a television presenter from Belfast, Northern Ireland. She appeared as a reporter on the BBC series Animal Hospital.

In 1989, she presented the ITV Sunday morning TV show Ghost Train.

Lowry presented the National Lottery and presented coverage of Northern Ireland's celebrations on the Millennium eve party. For a brief period, she was a reporter for GMTV. In the early 1990s, she also presented the RTÉ TV show Jo Maxi and the UTV/RTÉ co-produced travel series Bon Voyage.

In 1993, she appeared as a guest on RTÉ's Winning Streak with Mike Murphy.

In 2000, she appeared on the celebrity special of Robot Wars teamed with Wild Thing, but she was defeated by Vic Reeves in the first round. She also appeared on Lily Savage's Blankety Blank the following year.

In 2005, Lowry appeared in the ITV reality TV show Celebrity Wrestling, under the name Tigress.

She is the president of the Ulster Society for the Prevention of Cruelty to Animals (USPCA) and a trustee of the Battersea Dogs and Cats Home.

She is also a presenter of Animal Planet TV show Top Dog and has presented several television shows for CBBC.

She has also been a presenter on Thomas Cook TV.

She was part of the 2012 Summer Olympics Maker training sessions at Wembley Arena.

She presented a short piece on BBC One's Countryfile at a blacksmith's in 2013.
