= Play the Game (Irish game show) =

- Genre: Game show
- Presented by: Ronan Collins
- Starring: Twink (1984-1994); Brendan Grace (1984-1985); Derek Davis (1986-1994)
- Country of origin: Ireland
- Original language: English

Production
- Production locations: RTÉ Television Centre, Donnybrook, Dublin 4, Ireland
- Camera setup: Multi-camera
- Running time: 30 minutes

Original release
- Network: RTÉ 2 RTÉ One
- Release: 21 November 1984 – 9 April 1994

Play The Game is an Irish televised game show version of charades which was broadcast by RTÉ from 1984 to 1994. The show was hosted by Ronan Collins and featured two teams, one captained by Twink and the other by Brendan Grace. Later versions of the programme had Derek Davis as captain of the men's team.

== Format ==
The game was based on charades, a party game where players used mime rather than speaking to demonstrate a name, phrase, book, play, film or television programme. Each player was given roughly two minutes to act out their given subject in front of his/her team, and if the others were unsuccessful in guessing correctly, the opposing team would have a chance to answer for a bonus point.

It was similar to the UK gameshow Give Us A Clue.
