= Crystal Swing =

Irish country music band

- Origin: Lisgoold, Cork, Ireland
- Genres: Country and western Irish showband Country and Irish
- Years active: 2007–present
- Members: Mary Murray-Burke; Dervla Burke; Derek Burke
- Website: crystalswing.com

Crystal Swing are a new wave Country and western, and country and Irish showband, from Lisgoold, County Cork, Ireland. The family group is made up of mother Mary Murray-Burke and her children Dervla Burke and Derek Burke.

The group rose to national fame in February 2010 when a video of "He Drinks Tequila" became a viral 'sensation' after their video was posted by several well-known bloggers including Irish drag performer Panti and comedy writers Robert Popper and Graham Linehan. A few days later the video was posted by Sean Moncrieff on the website of Irish radio station Newstalk. The video achieved 80,000 hits in four days. As of 2 April 2010, the video had received over 1,000,000 hits on YouTube. "He Drinks Tequila" gained international recognition on 3 March when American chat show host and American Idol judge Ellen DeGeneres posted a link to the YouTube video on her official Twitter page. Despite being offered to perform on Newstalk, Crystal Swing opted to perform on the RTÉ flagship show The Late Late Show.

On 17 March 2010 (Saint Patrick's Day), US TV host Ellen DeGeneres showed a clip of Crystal Swing on her show, The Ellen DeGeneres Show.

On 18 March 2010, the single "He Drinks Tequila" entered the Irish Singles Chart at number 18.

== 2010 ==
In 2010, Crystal Swing appeared on satellite television show, Rural TV. A video of their appearance was then posted on YouTube, and immediately gained thousands of views daily. TV talk show host Ellen DeGeneres tweeted about the group. On 12 March, they made their first live television appearance on Irish television on The Late Late Show with Ryan Tubridy. On 15 March, they appeared on Newstalk 106-108fm with Seán Moncrieff, and on 16 March they appeared on The Afternoon Show. Later in the month they made appearances on Xposé and Ireland AM. On 6 April, they flew to Hollywood to make an appearance on The Ellen DeGeneres Show. The show was recorded on Thursday 8 April, and was broadcast in America on Monday, 12 April.

== Since 2010 ==
After their initial media exposure, the band undertook an extensive tour of the major venues in Ireland with a five-piece band and support acts. The band has appeared with stars such as Lily Allen and Bonnie Tyler as well as most of the home-grown Irish stars of the music industry.

Since 2010, Crystal Swing have continued to tour and have featured on many mainly Irish TV and Radio shows including Living with Lucy, Celebrity Bainisteoir, Driving Me Crazy, Republic of Telly, Celebrity Head Chef, Charity ICA Bootcamp, and Mastermind.

The band have also performed in London, Portugal and the Caribbean.

== Discography ==
=== Studio albums ===
Year	Album details	Peak chart positions	
Year	Album details	IRL	UK
2008	Sweet Dreams: Released: 2008; Label: Formats: CD	—	—
2010	The Best Years of Our Lives: Released: 19 March 2010; Label: Formats: CD, download	56	—

== Singles ==
Year	Title	Chart Positions	Album
Year	Title	IRL	Album
2010	"He Drinks Tequila"	18	The Best Years of Our Lives
2010	"The Hucklebuck"	42	The Best Years of Our Lives
"—" denotes a title that did not chart.
