= Saturday Live (Irish TV series) =

Irish chat show

- Genre: Light entertainment
- Presented by: Various
- Composer: Bill Whelan
- Country of origin: Ireland
- Original language: English
- No. of series: 3

Production
- Producer: Paul Cusack
- Production locations: Studio 1/Studio 4, RTÉ Television Centre, Donnybrook, Dublin 4
- Running time: 65–75 minutes
- Production company: RTÉ

Original release
- Network: RTÉ One
- Release: 25 October 1986 – 18 December 1999

Saturday Live is a televised talk show hosted by various guest presenters, which was broadcast live on RTÉ Television on Saturday nights from 1986 to 1988 and later revived from 1999 to 2000. Saturday Live featured guest interviews and live music from guest music groups and featured a mix of serious discussion and light chat. It was aimed at a younger audience than its main rival, The Late Late Show.

== History ==
The show was broadcast during the autumn-spring season (October to April) and was created to fill the vacant Saturday night slot after the departure of The Late Late Show from Saturday to Friday nights. It was first broadcast on RTÉ One on Saturday 25 October 1986. The original programme ended on 11 April 1988. It was succeeded in October 1988 by Kenny Live, hosted by Pat Kenny, and was revived for the 1999–2000 season after Kenny's departure to host the Late Late Show.

=== 1986–1988 ===
The original run of Saturday Live from 1986–1988 was hosted by a series of guest presenters.

The first episode was presented by Feargal Quinn. Other episodes were presented by BP Fallon, Alan Dukes (then leader of Fine Gael), Rhonda Paisley (daughter of the Rev. Ian Paisley), Eamon Dunphy (soccer pundit), Johnny Giles (soccer pundit), Anthony Cronin (poet), Tiede Herrema (industrialist), Mary Mooney (Fianna Fáil TD), Michael Cleary (priest), Bernard Loughlin, Joe Dolan (singer), Brendan Shine (singer), Yvonne Costelloe, Niall Tóibín (comedian and actor), Eamon Casey (bishop), Pat Ingoldsby (poet), Ulick O'Connor (writer), Henry Mountcharles (aristocrat), Henry Kelly (broadcaster), Shay Healy (broadcaster), Colm Tóibín (writer), Rosemary Smith (rally driver), Tommy Makem (musician), Mick Lally (actor), Ina Broughall, Ronnie Drew (singer), Mícheál Ó Muircheartaigh (sports commentator), Tracy Piggott (broadcaster) Eamon Morrissey (actor), Joe Lynch (actor), and Stephen Roche (professional cyclist).

Bibi Baskin also presented an episode, and subsequently went on to host her own chat show for 6 years from autumn 1988 during midweek.

An episode was also hosted by current-affairs broadcaster Pat Kenny, whose own first attempt at a chat show, The Pat Kenny Show had failed. Kenny's success in the Saturday Live show, together with his hosting of the 1988 Eurovision Song Contest, led to his being considered competent in light entertainment, and he was effectively being made the permanent presenter of the show when the Saturday Live incarnation was replaced in October 1988 by the rebranded Kenny Live.

=== 1999–2000 ===
Following Pat Kenny's move to present The Late Late Show in autumn 1999, the Kenny Live incarnation was retired and the Saturday Live formula was revived for the Saturday night slot for the 1999-2000 season, again with rotating guest presenters.

Among the guest presenters were John Daly (television presenter), Tracy Piggott, Dana (singer) and Dave Fanning (broadcaster).

The revived show proved unpopular and ended after only one series.

| Preceded by The Pat Kenny Show | Saturday night programming on Telefís Éireann; 1986–1988 | Succeeded by Kenny Live |
| Preceded by Kenny Live | Saturday night programming on Telefís Éireann; 1999 | Succeeded by Films - eventually succeeded by Tubridy Tonight |
