= Jo Maxi =

- Also known as: Brash; Hullabullu; Get a Life; Babel; The Plastic Orange
- Genre: Teenage
- Starring: Ray D'Arcy, Clíona Ní Bhuachalla, Antoinette Dawson and Geri Lalor (1988 - 1990); Shauna Lowry, Susan Kavanagh, Michael Sheridan, Margaret O'Donoghue, Niamh Walsh and Celine Whelan(1990 - 1993), Brian Reddin, Brian Graham and Gemma Hill (1992 - 1994) Colin Murnane, (1993 - 1994)
- Country of origin: Ireland
- Original language: English

Production
- Producers: Dermot Horan, Carol Chaffer (1993/1994)
- Camera setup: Brian Miley (1993/1994)
- Running time: 30 minutes

Original release
- Network: RTÉ Two/Network 2
- Release: September 1988 – June 1993

Related
- Echo Island

Jo Maxi, named after Dublin slang for a taxi, was an Irish teenage entertainment show which would report on teenage issues. The presenters would discuss issues relating to teenagers through reports and studio discussions. They would also review books, movies and other TV shows. Gig Guides and job/study information was also reported each night. It was broadcast on Network 2 as part RTÉ's redevelopment of its second channel from October 1988. It was first presented by Ray D'Arcy, Clíona Ní Bhuachalla and various other presenters and reporters.

== Format ==
Jo Maxi was presented from the RTÉ Studios in Donnybrook. It was broadcast each weeknight at 6 o'clock. Various reports were made by different presenters around the country with link-ups to different individuals telling viewers of events coming up in their areas. New bands and music videos were also showcased.

In 1993 Jo Maxi was revamped; this revamp did away with the Jo Maxi brand but the end credits would state that it was a JMTV Production, and would also use the Petrol Pump logo. The relaunch followed on from the successful redesign of Friday's JMTVshow, originally a pop video show, as 'Rocks The Garden' presented by Colin Murnane. It was a wide ranging arts and music magazine show, shot in Temple Bar with live music performed in The Rock Garden Dublin.

The new look Jo Maxi had a different show each weekday. Monday’s was an arts review show called Brash presented by Niamh Walsh, Tuesday’s was a chat show called Hullabullu, Wednesday’s was presented by Gemma Hill called Get a Life it was a job/study guide, Thursday’s was presented by Eileen O’Reilly and was a debate show where different schools would debate a topic in a debate competition, it was called Babel and Friday’s was called Plastic Orange, an alternative pop music show presented by Colin Murnane. Each of the new shows (bar Brash) were presented from RTÉ; Brash was presented around Dublin City. Plastic Orange Crush was a late night spin-off screened in the summer and highlighted by Hot Press Magazine as one of the TV Highlights of the year.

== Initial idea ==
In October 1988, RTÉ 2 was revamped as Network 2. This revamp involved a new logo and brand but also a brand new schedule. The schedule would move most of RTÉ's sports, children's and Irish language programming to Network 2.

As part of this new station RTÉ extended its children's programming starting with Bosco at 14:30 and Dempsey's Den at 15:00 until 18:00, effectively Network 2's afternoon schedule was a children's channel. Jo Maxi would air each week night at 18:00 following The Den. It preceded the Australian teenage soap opera Home and Away. It was aimed at a teenage audience as a lead into Home and Away, and all these changes were brought to air on the day the newly-branded channel was launched - October 3, 1988. This was a month later than the usual traditional TV season launch of September due to the 1988 Summer Olympics, which had ended the day before and which had been covered on the formerly-named RTÉ 2.

In 1994 Jo Maxi was replaced by the children's TV Show Echo Island, the 6 o'clock slot would host various shows mainly imported children's TV including Garfield and Friends and Are You Afraid of the Dark?, but ultimately it was replaced by The Simpsons.

== Further careers ==
- Ray D'Arcy has had a very successful and varied career in Irish TV and radio.
- Clíona Ní Bhuachalla is a producer and co-founder of Icebox Films, and has worked as a producer for RTÉ and TG4 on such successful programmes as Ros na Rún and The Clinic.
- Shauna Lowry continues to work in television, especially in Northern Ireland where she is from.
- Susan Kavanagh left Jo Maxi to join rock band A House.
- Michael Sheridan continued on other TV projects and featured on the satirical sketch show Bull Island from 1999-2001, before turning to motoring journalism
- Colin Murnane moved to London to present for TCC, Trouble, Challenge TV, BBC, Sky One, BBC Radio 5 Live, and more. He is also one of the busiest voice-over artists in Soho and is heard on many ads and campaigns in Ireland still. He also produced and directed the acclaimed documentary The Song For The Year about musician Pierce Turner.
- Geri Lalor is now a qualified secondary school teacher, where she teaches English at Junior and Leaving Cert levels.
- Niamh Walsh is a primary school principal in County Galway.
