= Kenny Live =

- Genre: Light entertainment
- Directed by: John O'Regan
- Presented by: Pat Kenny
- Country of origin: Ireland
- Original language: English
- No. of series: 11

Production
- Producer: Fiona Keane
- Production locations: Studio 1/Studio 4, RTÉ Television Centre, Donnybrook, Dublin 4
- Running time: 75–120 minutes

Original release
- Network: RTÉ One
- Release: 15 October 1988 – 22 May 1999

Related
- Saturday Live; The Late Late Show, Bibi

Kenny Live is a televised talk show presented by Pat Kenny on Raidió Teilifís Éireann (RTÉ). The show debuted in 1988 and aired every Saturday night, except during the summer months, directly after the main evening news. In 1999 Kenny Live came to an end when Kenny succeeded Gay Byrne as host of The Late Late Show.

== History ==
Following the departure of The Late Late Show from the Saturday night slot to Friday nights in 1985, RTÉ was left with a gap in its Saturday night schedule. In 1986, a new chat show called Saturday Live was devised to fill the void. The new show, which featured a different guest presenter every week, ran for two series from 1986 to 1988. It proved unpopular, however. For the autumn schedule in 1988, RTÉ devised a new chat show with a permanent host. Mike Murphy was rumoured to be the host; however, the job ultimately went to Pat Kenny. Since the late 1970s, Kenny had been more associated with current affairs broadcasting, having presented Today Tonight. However, he also showed that he could handle light entertainment when he co-hosted the 1988 Eurovision Song Contest and an edition of Saturday Live that proved successful.

=== Production ===
For the first three years of Kenny Live, the show was broadcast from Studio 1 in the RTÉ Television Centre at Donnybrook, Dublin 4. That studio was also home to the show's Friday night rival The Late Late Show. As RTÉ's biggest studio at the time, the studio held 120 audience members. In January 1991, the show moved into the larger Studio 4, which was originally opened in 1982, but was not fully used by RTÉ until 1986. The size of the audience also more than doubled to 250.

=== Kenny takes over The Late Late Show ===
In 1999, Gay Byrne retired as host of The Late Late Show. There was some speculation as to whether the show would also be retired with Byrne, with Kenny simply transferring Kenny Live to the vacant Friday night slot. In the end it was realised that The Late Late Show was too valuable a brand to discontinue as it had consistently been first or second in RTÉ's ratings viewership figures. Because of this, the Kenny Live brand was retired, with the Saturday night slot reverting to the previous Saturday Live format, and Kenny becoming host of The Late Late Show.

== Format ==
Kenny Live featured guest interviews and live music from guest music groups and featured a mix of serious discussion and light chat aimed at a younger audience than its main rival The Late Late Show.

Preceded by Saturday Live	Saturday night programming on Telefís Éireann; 1988 - 1999	Succeeded by Saturday Live
