= The Late Late Show (Irish talk show) =

Irish chat show

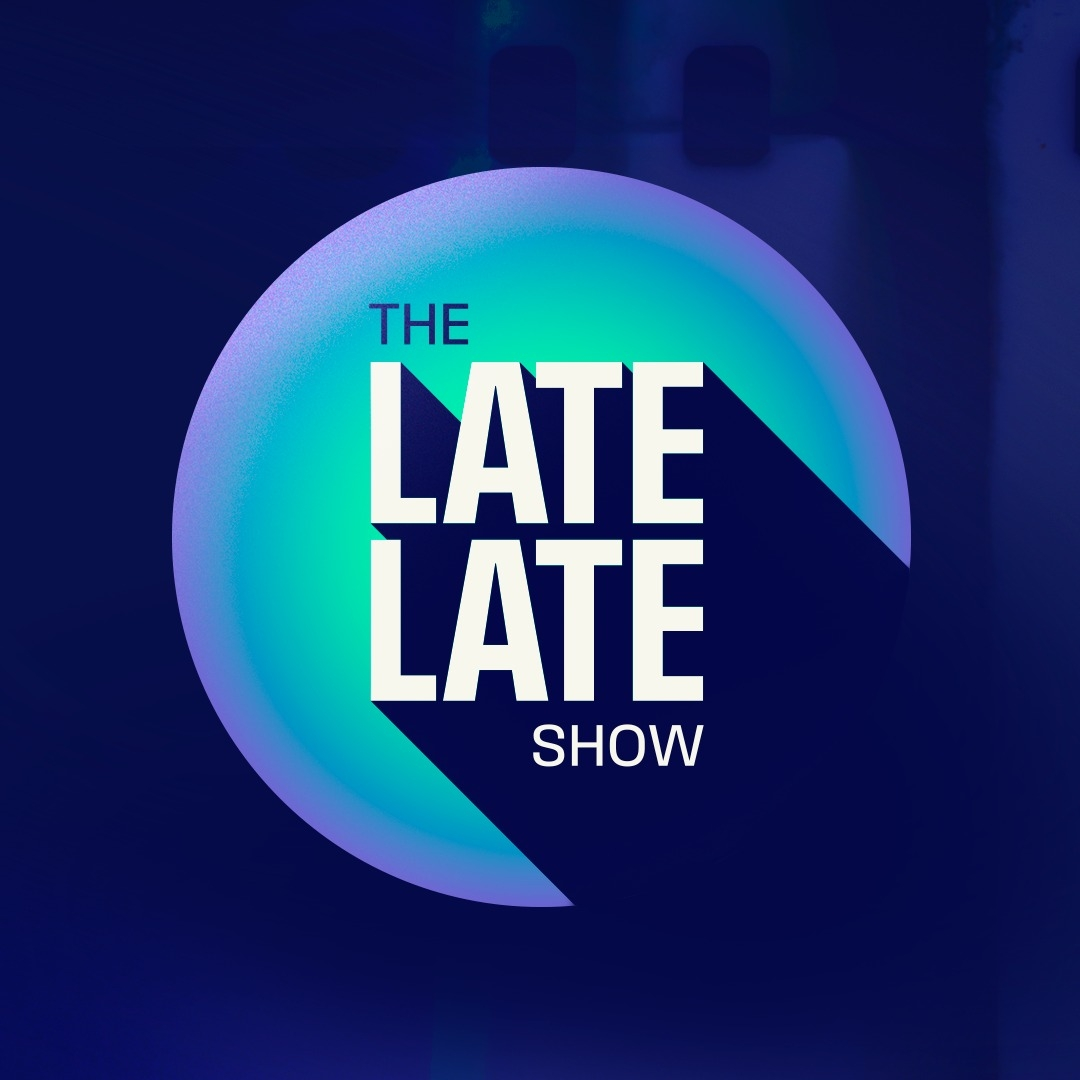
- Also known as: The Late Late
- Presented by: Gay Byrne; Pat Kenny; Ryan Tubridy; Patrick Kielty; Stand ins: Gerry Ryan; Frank Hall; Pat Kenny; Miriam O'Callaghan
- Theme music composer: Chris Andrews
- Opening theme: "To Whom It Concerns" (1960s–1999, 2009–)
- Ending theme: "The Late Late Show" by Nat King Cole (Gay Byrne and Patrick Kielty eras)
- Country of origin: Ireland
- Original languages: English, Irish
- No. of seasons: 50+
- No. of episodes: More than 500 by 1979 (list of episodes)

Production
- Executive producers: Michael Kealy; John McMahon; Jim Jennings; Larry Masterson
- Production locations: Studio 4, RTÉ Television Centre, Donnybrook, Dublin 4
- Running time: 90 minutes

Original release
- Network: RTÉ One
- Release: 6 July 1962 – present

Related
- Kenny Live; Saturday Live; The Saturday Night Show; Saturday Night with Miriam; Tubridy Tonight

The Late Late Show, with its title often shortened to The Late Late, is an Irish chat show. It is the world's second longest-running late-night talk show, after the American The Tonight Show, and is the longest-running live talk show. Perceived as the official flagship television programme of RTÉ, it is regarded as an Irish television institution, and is broadcast live across normally two hours in front of a studio audience on Friday nights at 9:30 pm between September and May. Certain segments are sometimes pre-recorded and aired within the live parts of the show.

Having maintained the same name and format continuously, The Late Late Show was first broadcast on Friday 6 July 1962 at 11:20 pm and in colour from 1976. Originating as temporary summer filler for a niche Saturday night audience (airing at 11:30 pm), it later moved to its current home on Friday night schedules. The format has remained largely the same throughout, featuring interviews, musical performances and discourse on topical issues. It has influenced attitudes of the populace towards approval or disapproval of its chosen topics, directed social change and helped shape Irish societal norms. It averages 650,000 viewers per episode and has consistently achieved RTÉ's highest ratings.

For much of its early life, RTÉ Television Centre's Studio 1 at Montrose in Donnybrook, Dublin 4, was its home; this original studio accommodated a small audience of about 120. In 1995, The Late Late Show transferred to the more spacious Studio 4, adapted specifically to cater for this and Kenny Live. Three external broadcasts have aired, including from the Wexford Opera House on 5 September 2008 and, most recently, from London in 2018.

Gay Byrne hosted the show from its inception until 21 May 1999. Pat Kenny was Byrne's successor, hosting the show for ten years between 1999 and 2009. Ryan Tubridy succeeded Kenny in September 2009 and hosted the show for fourteen years. Under Tubridy, first Quinn Group and then Sky Broadband added sponsorship deals. Tubridy's arrival coincided with a marked increase in audience ratings, with some early statistics comparing him to the Byrne era. Patrick Kielty is the current presenter, having succeeded Tubridy in September 2023.

== 1962–1999: Gay Byrne ==
Logo during the Gay Byrne era

The idea for the show was developed by RTÉ producer Tom McGrath, after he had seen The Tonight Show while working for a Canadian TV station. He proposed it to Gay Byrne, who became the show's first presenter. The first episode aired on Friday 6 July 1962 at 23:20. Byrne was then a young Irish broadcaster working with Granada Television in Britain; while there he had become the first person to introduce The Beatles on television on People and Places.

Originally intended as light summer "filler", The Late Late Show soon developed into a forum for contentious opinion and debate, involving topics such as divorce, contraception and a number of areas hitherto unspoken. Much of the populace, especially in the south and west of Ireland, had no previous experience of television, and many were unprepared for The Late Late Show bringing such discussion into their homes (large swathes of Ireland were rural and devoutly Roman Catholic). Indeed, the politician Oliver J. Flanagan, whilst guesting on the show, proclaimed there to have been "no sex in Ireland until Teilifís Éireann went on the air", reflecting this greater indiscretion. Archbishop of Dublin, John Charles McQuaid, was confronted by a guest in the show's first series — a sensational and unprecedented event. Many more such events would follow, each contributing to the folklore and mythical qualities of The Late Late Show.

Two common formats were used: the first — a series of interviews of celebrity guests, most of whom could be defined as Irish or British and involved in the entertainment industry; the second — a defined topic involving live discussion from a panel and studio audience. The latter tended to be far the weightier in content, as people who were directly connected with the defined topic sat in the audience.

Byrne would remain host for 37 years, retiring in 1999. He came out of retirement to present such programmes as The Meaning of Life and Who Wants to Be a Millionaire?; as of September 2009, Byrne's 37 years remains the longest period through which any individual has hosted a televised talk show. In 1964, with the launch of BBC2, Byrne moved back to the United Kingdom, where his career had started. Frank Hall presented The Late Late Show in Byrne's absence. However, after one year, Byrne returned to RTÉ to present his old show, supplemented by his own radio show.

Few of the 1960s editions of The Late Late Show are extant, as it was prohibitively expensive to use tape to record at this time.

=== Bishop and the Nightie ===
A minor furore erupted in 1966 when the Bishop of Clonfert condemned The Late Late Show as "immoral" and Gay Byrne as a promoter of "filth". The condemnation stemmed from a small item on the show in which Byrne was interviewing a number of couples to see how well they knew each other. Byrne asked the married Fox couple from Terenure what colour nightdress Eileen Fox wore during her honeymoon. Richard Fox implied it was "transparent" and Eileen said she had not worn any nightdress (audio recording). This response was received with laughter by Byrne and the studio audience, with Eileen Fox then suggesting that her nightdress had been white from the options offered. However, the Bishop either misheard or ignored this, feeling the need to protest against this "filthy" programme and the "filth" which was being televised into the nation's homes.

The Bishop of Clonfert sent a telegram: "Disgusted with disgraceful performance", prompting a swift RTÉ apology which the Irish Examiner states was similar to the apology the same broadcaster issued during the Brian Cowen nude portraits controversy in 2009. Meath VEC said it was "anti-national", whilst Loughrea Town Council described it as "a dirty programme that should be abolished altogether". The furore died down after a number of weeks, but is still remembered. When the topic featured on the 2008 documentary How the Irish Have Sex broadcast by rival channel TV3, the Irish Independent's Damian Corless said Éamon de Valera "won't be turning on, but will instead be turning in his grave".

=== Brian Trevaskis affair ===
On a March 1966 episode of The Late Late Show a debate was held on the Roman Catholic Church. Brian Trevaskis, a young student and President of The Phil Society of Trinity College, making his first television appearance, criticised the Bishop of Galway, Michael Browne, for spending so much on a cathedral instead of helping the poor. Trevaskis described the building as a "monstrosity" and referred to the bishop as a "moron". He was invited back on the show the following week, 6 April, to expand on his opinions. The student referred to the fiftieth anniversary of the Easter Rising, a pivotal moment in Irish history, when he expressed his concern over the devotion of money to building churches in a society where women who were impregnated outside marriage were considered outcasts and as such were vulnerable members of society. Trevaskis claimed Ireland was not a Christian country and when asked by the bishop if he knew the meaning of the word "moron", he replied that he was uncertain the bishop knew the meaning of the word "Christian".

=== Annie Murphy interview ===
In 1992, Bishop Eamonn Casey resigned when it was revealed that he had broken his vow of celibacy having fathered a child with a young American divorcee named Annie Murphy in 1973 during his tenure as Bishop of Kerry. Casey was a well-known bishop with a national profile, and had been a guest on The Late Late Show on several occasions. In April 1993, Murphy appeared on The Late Late Show to speak about the affair and their child, Peter. Casey had supported their son financially, but had requested that this be kept quiet to protect his career. At the end of the interview Byrne said if the baby was "half the man his father was" he would be fine and Annie Murphy replied that the boy's mother (meaning herself) was "not so bad either", drawing applause from the studio audience. Casey spent most of his time following the scandal outside Ireland in an effort to avoid media attention, but eventually returned in 2006. More than twenty years later, the Irish Examiner named this one of its "Top 10 moments of Irish television".

=== Tom Gilmartin affair ===
In 1999, Pádraig Flynn, Ireland's EU Commissioner, appeared on the show, during which he commented on Tom Gilmartin and a donation of £50,000 to the Fianna Fáil party. Flynn also talked about "the difficulties" in his own life; he talked of having a salary of IR£100,000 and trying to run three houses, cars and housekeepers along with regular travel. The performance was seen as very out of touch, at a time when house prices in Ireland were rising dramatically, and the average industrial wage was £15,380.

Flynn also made remarks concerning Gilmartin, a Luton-based Irish developer and investor. In response to Byrne's question that Flynn knew Gilmartin, Flynn answered, "Oh yes, yes. I haven't seen him now for some years. I met him. He's a Sligo man who went to England, made a lot of money, came back, wanted to do a lot of business in Ireland, didn't work out for him, didn't work out for him. He's not well. His wife isn't well. He's out of sorts." Flynn seemed to attack the credibility of Gilmartin at a time when he was making allegations in the media of planning irregularities in Dublin.

Gilmartin responded by publicising details of Flynn's failed attempts to get Gilmartin to change his evidence. This led to Flynn's career being effectively ended because the government would not endorse him for reappointment to the European Commission after its mass resignation that year. This "vanity platform" on The Late Late Show saw, as the Irish Examiner later referred to it, Flynn "managed to get both feet into his mouth and talk at the same time".

=== Other incidents ===
Playboy
In January 1966, Victor Lownes, a representative of Playboy, was expected to appear on The Late Late Show; however, he was axed when he revealed that he hoped to recruit young women to work as Bunnies in Playboy clubs.
Women's rights
Elderly feminist campaigner Hilary Boyle criticised the Irish government when she appeared on The Late Late Show during the 1970s, calling them "all so afraid of a belt of the crozier (the Bishop's stick)".
Contraceptive train
When several women, amongst them June Levine and Nell McCafferty, carried bags of condoms from Belfast on a train in protest at Ireland's strict anti-contraception laws in 1971, The Late Late Show became involved in the incident when one of the women, Mary Kenny, appeared in the studio to say that the law was "pretty damn weird".
Lesbian nuns
In 1979, Gay Byrne interviewed a lesbian on The Late Late Show, escaping public condemnation in the process. However, when two former nuns who were lesbians, Rosemary Curb and Nancy Manahan, were booked to appear in 1985, a High Court case ensued and calls came for The Late Late Show to be axed altogether as it would "greatly undermine Christian moral values" and "the respect of the general public for nuns" to feature the pair on live television. Protestors gathered to recite decades of the rosary, sing hymns as the show got underway. According to the Irish Examiner, "the interview with the nuns ended up being not all that scandalous". During the discussion, Sr. Maura, an Irish nun from the Daughters of Sion, remarked that members of the clergy don't 'leave their sexuality at the door' when they enter religious life.
AIDS special
An AIDS special in the 1980s included a controversial demonstration on live television of how to attach a condom to a finger.
Brian Lenihan
Gay Byrne was a personal friend of Brian Lenihan and presented a tribute show in March 1990 to support the case for Lenihan as a candidate for the office of President of Ireland in the 1990 presidential election.
Minding the children
In 1992 several female TDs who had been newly elected to Dáil Éireann appeared on the programme, with Gay Byrne wondering who was taking care of their children.
Peter Brooke
In 1992 the British Secretary of State for Northern Ireland, Peter Brooke appeared on The Late Late Show. After a pleasant interview, Byrne coaxed and goaded the unwilling Brooke into singing "Oh My Darling, Clementine" on a day when seven Protestant construction workers had been killed by an IRA bomb. Unionists were outraged at what seemed to be a moment clearly out of touch with grieving families, and instantly requested the resignation of Brooke. Brooke was humiliated, and subsequently lost his position as Secretary of State to Sir Patrick Mayhew after the 1992 British General Election in April.
Gerry Adams
As a response to a change in legislation against terrorist groups being given publicity, known as Section 31, it became possible for RTÉ to interview Sinn Féin leader Gerry Adams in 1994. Byrne set up a show, with a panel of public figures, Jim Kemmy, Dermot Ahern, Michael McDowell, Hugh Leonard and Austin Currie. The last three openly loathed Adams. Byrne was ordered by RTE management to avoid shaking hands with Adams, something Byrne disagreed with but ultimately complied. During the show, a number of people telephoned in stating that Byrne and the other panelists were acting in a "hostile and aggressive" manner towards Adams. Byrne maintained that nobody was specially invited to the audience. The interview did not seem to damage Adams's popularity, with the Irish Examiner reporting that 70 per cent of people held a favourable view of him after the show.
Terry Keane
The Late Late Show continued to cause controversy right up to Byrne's departure. On his penultimate show in 1999, he interviewed the gossip columnist Terry Keane, who went on to reveal a long affair with the former Taoiseach, Charles Haughey. Haughey, a lifelong acquaintance of Byrne, had intended to be available for the last show but went into hiding from the media as a result of the revelations. Haughey had appealed to Keane not to reveal her story. Keane was publicising her book covering her life in Irish public life, and her career as a journalist with the Irish Independent newspaper group.
Bill Murray
One show featured an interview with Ghostbusters actor Bill Murray. In the audience, comedian Jason Byrne masqueraded as a man who had set up a paranormal investigation agency, similar to that in the film. Murray responded by making a joke regarding his experience in a local restaurant.

Rita Hanley call
In a broadcast on 2 May 1997, the show featured a competition whereby viewers could win a car by submitting a postcard entry. After the first selected winner wasn't available to answer the call, a second winner was called, named Rita Hanley from Cork. When Byrne asked if she was happy and whether she was watching the show, Hanley replied that she was not, as her daughter had died in a road accident the previous day. Rather than terminating the call, Byrne remained on the line to offer condolences with the help of studio guests, including a nun and poet Brendan Kennelly, who recited his poem "Begin." It transpired that Lynda, the late daughter in question, had posted the card for her mother. The unscripted exchange received widespread public attention and has since been cited by media commentators as one of the most significant and memorable moments in Irish television history.

=== Byrne's role as producer ===
The flexibility of the show was augmented by Byrne's position not merely as the show's presenter but also as its producer for much of his period with the show. He intentionally reminded the viewer that the show was being broadcast live through his interaction with people working behind the scenes. Cameras were visible, and if an audience member was invited to speak, the boom microphone could be seen swinging overhead. Some of Byrne's phrases became well known; when instructing that a piece of videotape be played, he invariably announced "you can roll it there, Colette/Roisín", chat to the floor manager, inquiring as to what telephone line a caller was ringing in on, and on some shows would extend its running time by fifteen or thirty minutes, discussing the extra running time with the floor staff and production team as an "aside" during an interview. The effect of all these mannerisms was said to add to the sense of realism in the show, that, as the theme music at the end of the show stated: "It started on The Late Late Show." This was a clip of the Nat King Cole song "The Late Late Show", which appeared on his 1959 album Big Band Cole.

=== Byrne's final show ===
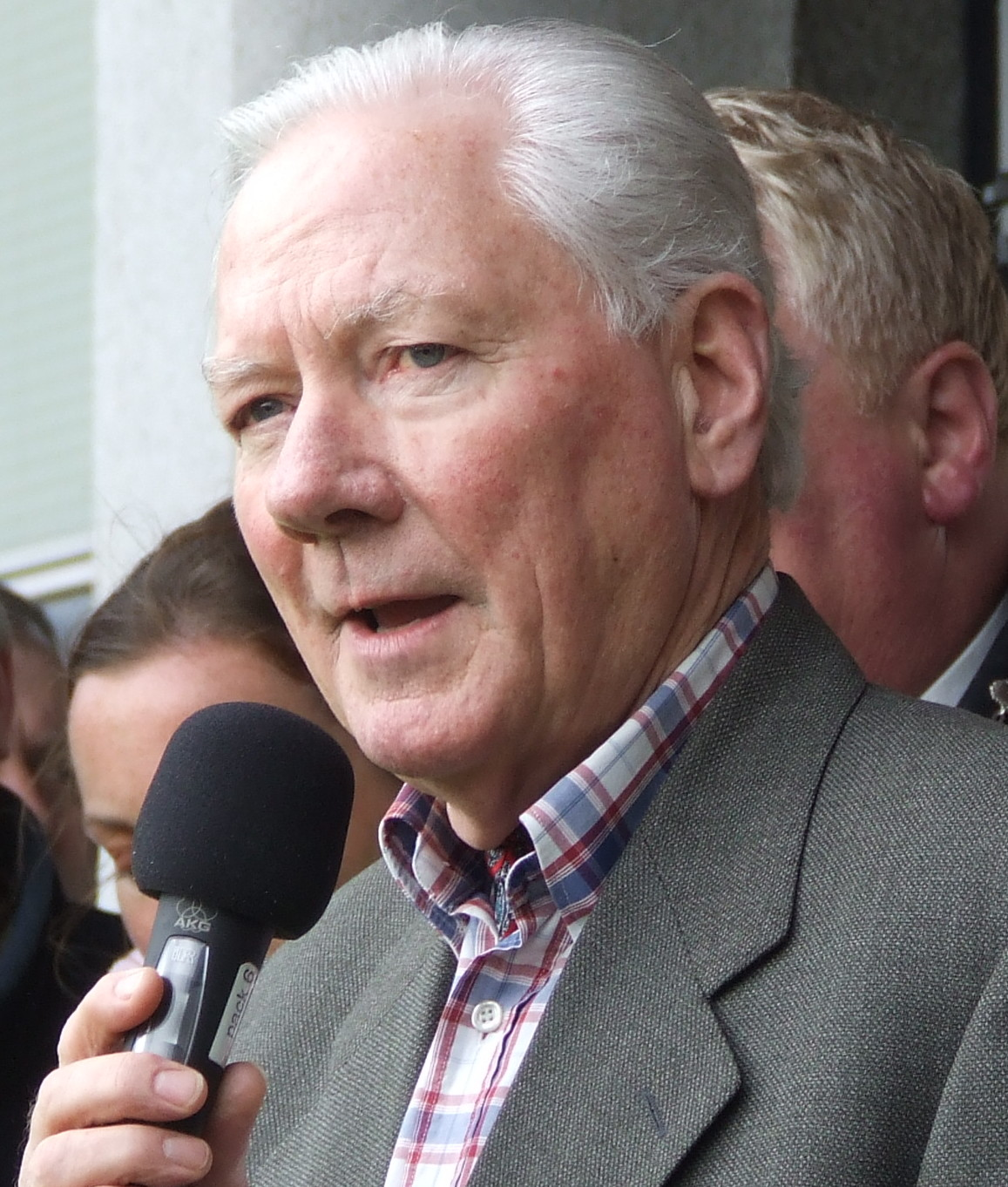
Gay Byrne, seen here in 2007

On 21 May 1999, Byrne presented his last edition of The Late Late Show. The show, beginning at 21:30, lasted four hours (twice as long as a normal edition of The Late Late Show at the time). Tributes flooded in from all quarters for the host. High-profile guests on this final show included author Salman Rushdie and comedian Billy Connolly.

The then Irish President Mary McAleese told Byrne:

You're bearing up well, but people out there are crying tonight, they're very sad. You've entertained us, you've educated us, you've exasperated us. What more could anyone ask over 37 years?

There were also glowing tributes for Byrne from then Taoiseach Bertie Ahern, RTÉ broadcasters Des Cahill, Larry Gogan, Mike Murphy, Marian Finucane, American counterpart Merv Griffin, former Taoiseach Charles Haughey and various other celebrities.

There were musical performances on the night from The Corrs, Christy Moore, Sarah Brightman and Rosaleen Linehan. U2 members Bono and Larry Mullen presented Byrne with a Harley-Davidson motorcycle as a retirement present. Byrne was spotted on the bike regularly, until January 2003 when Byrne and U2 jointly auctioned the bike for The Children's Medical & Research Foundation at Our Lady's Children's Hospital, Crumlin, Dublin.

== 1999–2009: Pat Kenny ==
Including Gerry Ryan for one night.

When Byrne left, The Late Late Show dominated RTÉ's ratings viewership figures, coming in consistently either at number 1 or number 2. (Note: The Late Late Show and Glenroe—a 20th-century soap opera—regularly swapped positions, being either 1 or 2 (RTÉ Guide)) Some columnists writing in the Sunday Independent and The Irish Times called for the show be dropped as its success was linked too intricately with Byrne to work with anyone else. RTÉ, however, retained the show, justifying the decision as it being a powerful brand that attracted extensive advertising revenue. Contemporary media reports speculated that Patrick Kielty, Marian Finucane, Gerry Ryan and Gerry Kelly would take over. However, RTÉ gave the show to Pat Kenny, who for nearly a decade had presented his own Kenny Live show in the Saturday night time slot. Even after seven years at the helm of that show Kenny was often criticised in the media for his presentation style.

Kenny and his staff changed many aspects of The Late Late Show. Its distinctive title music (Note: An instrumental version of the Chris Andrews 1965 UK Top Twenty hit "To Whom It Concerns") was changed, as was the set design and studio layout. Guests, instead of remaining on, were involved only in that part of the show when the focus was them. A new set abandoned the traditional presenter's desk. Unlike Byrne, Kenny ensured his guests were announced in advance. Other than the title, the use of an owl as the show's symbol and the traditional edition marketing toys to children and their parents, (Note: The Late Late Toy Show, broadcast in late November or early December, on which children and special guests advise on the latest toys available for the Christmas market each year.) little of the original remained the same. Byrne's two catchphrases, "It started on The Late Late Show", and "one for everyone in the audience" (Note: When having shown some item on the show, Byrne would announce that there was "one for everyone in the audience" (i.e. that each person sitting in the studio audience would receive their own version of said item).) were dropped. The latter of these phrases has since been revived under Kenny's successor but was not much in use when Kenny was at the helm.

=== "That rude interruption" ===
"The Late Late Intruder"
24 November 2006

As the 24 November 2006 edition of the show was getting underway, an intruder, Paul Stokes from Monkstown, Dublin, emerged from off screen to confront a visibly startled Pat Kenny, who had just greeted three guests, You're a Star judges Thomas Black, Linda Martin, and Brendan O'Connor. Stokes approached Kenny, with his back to the camera, crouched down closer to Kenny and accused Kenny of being a "censor" and described him and his predecessor, Gay Byrne, as "insufferable arseholes". The incident was broadcast live and uncensored before the studio audience. Kenny repeatedly uttered "thank you, thank you". The show cut to a premature commercial break while Stokes was removed from the studio. When the show returned to television screens, Kenny apologised to viewers for what he described as "that rude interruption" and began his interview. Stokes was arrested but later released.

Today FM presenter Jenny Kelly reportedly went into labour whilst laughing as the incident unfolded on her television screen. She described her initial intention as having been to sit down for an evening of Kenny and to "bore the baby into arriving".

It was later revealed that Stokes' daughter was a member of The Late Late Show crew. Shortly after the initial incident, Stokes rammed his vehicle into the front entrance of RTÉ's Donnybrook facility; no one was injured. He was also reported to have stood outside Kenny's house shouting insults and to have painted threatening messages on walls near the house, although a charge of harassment connected with the case was dropped. Stokes was later sentenced to two years in prison for ramming the RTÉ entrance.

=== Other incidents ===
O'Reilly/Callaly interview
In late October 2004, three weeks after Rachel O'Reilly was found murdered at her home in the Naul, County Dublin, the mother and husband of the woman, Rose Callaly and Joe O'Reilly, were Kenny's guests. Callaly's trauma was evident; O'Reilly calmly dealt with Kenny's questions. O'Reilly was later arrested. Two years later, he was convicted of the crime.

Brendan Gleeson
On 17 March 2006 (Saint Patrick's Day, the national holiday), actor Brendan Gleeson became emotional while disclosing his views on the state of the national health service.

Enrique Iglesias
In 2007, an interview with Spanish singer Enrique Iglesias proved awkward for Kenny. When Kenny persisted in asking about his relationship with the tennis player Anna Kournikova, Iglesias responded: "You ask the questions so dry and so seriously that it kind of scares me."

"Jerry Seinfield"
In 2007, Kenny famously introduced the U.S. comedian Jerry Seinfeld as "Jerry Seinfield". Much uncomfortable chat on the topic of bees (Seinfeld being on the show to promote Bee Movie) ensued before Kenny presented Seinfeld with a cheap imitation of his favourite superhero, Superman.

Ticket tearing
In November 2008, Kenny telephoned a competition winner for a prize of a weekend in Dublin, shopping money and two tickets to the Late Late Toy Show episode. The winner, a woman from Cork city, answered the phone and correctly answered the competition question ("Roald Dahl"). The woman's apparent lack of enthusiasm prompted Kenny to turn to Charlie Bird (who had been his previous guest) and say: "If they tortured her, they couldn't get anything out of this woman." Bird laughed. When asked who would be accompanying her using the other ticket, the woman said she was "not particularly interested" in the tickets and tried explaining her idea that they instead be raffled so that a worthier winner might be found. Kenny, the phone receiver perched between his ear and shoulder, pulled the offending sheets of paper from his breast pocket, tore them and said: "I think I'll give up this job".

Pete Doherty
In February 2009, an interview with the English rock musician proved awkward for Kenny with the presenter repeatedly asking about the singer's private life and showing no interest in his music.

Senate first
In March 2009, a debate was held pitting twenty senators against journalists John Drennan and Ian O'Doherty on a proposal to abolish Seanad Éireann. Executive producer Larry Masterson described it as a "first ever for TV".

=== Set design under Kenny ===
Pat Kenny on the new set as launched in September 2007

RTÉ launched the last revamp while Kenny was the host on Friday 7 September 2007, introducing a new set but retaining the title sequence in use since 2003. Designed by Darragh Treacy of RTÉ Production Design, that set consisted of metal, timber and polycarbonate, with carpet as a floor covering; it made for a more complex and layered background than the previous arrangement and was heavily dependent on saturated lighting and modern construction materials. According to Treacy: "I wanted something contemporary that would be architectural and structural, [for example] the horizontal lines and boxes that you see running throughout the set. [...] The back wall of the [chat area] has textured panels which just take the light beautifully and give a great three-dimensional effect. Then the polycarbonate boxes sit in front of that. The fins – the large timber sections – to the left of the chat area are replicated in the entertainment area as well, and are large pieces of timber with a paint finish that take the light."

A desk also reappeared, as initially continued after Byrne's departure but disposed of shortly afterwards despite a final-attempt redesign in 2000. Kenny noted: "After eight seasons of sitting around, lounging around, as if in a living room, we decided just for a change that we'd put the desk in and see what difference it made. We'll work with it: I mean if it doesn't work after five or six weeks, it goes – if it does work, well we'll find ways of using it effectively. I mean it does put a little barrier between myself and the guest, but on the other hand it can be very useful for a formal interview where you don't want to be too intimate with your guest if it's a little bit antagonistic, whereas in the past I was always reclining and even if I had to be a bit aggressive with a guest the body language was a little bit confusing in that regard. So we'll see." In an apparent effort to resolve such problems, the new desk had more of a table design with a transparent underside, was angled to be narrower at the guest end, and was composed of thin elegant profiles of timber and glass.

A new entrance flight of steps was also introduced, somewhat redolent of former Kenny Live sets. Treacy again: "I wanted a grand entrance, but I also wanted an entrance that was part of the background of the set, so they arrive down and join Pat – and it's a feature walk-on for guests". Kenny approved of the steps: "As you come down the steps, be it myself or a guest, you're slowly revealed: more and more of your body is revealed to the audience until finally you're standing in the 'doorway' as it were. I think it'll be interesting; a more dramatic entrance than we've had for the past three or four years." Irish company Design Classics Direct provided new chairs, made to an original 1929 design by Eileen Gray.

=== Kenny's final show ===
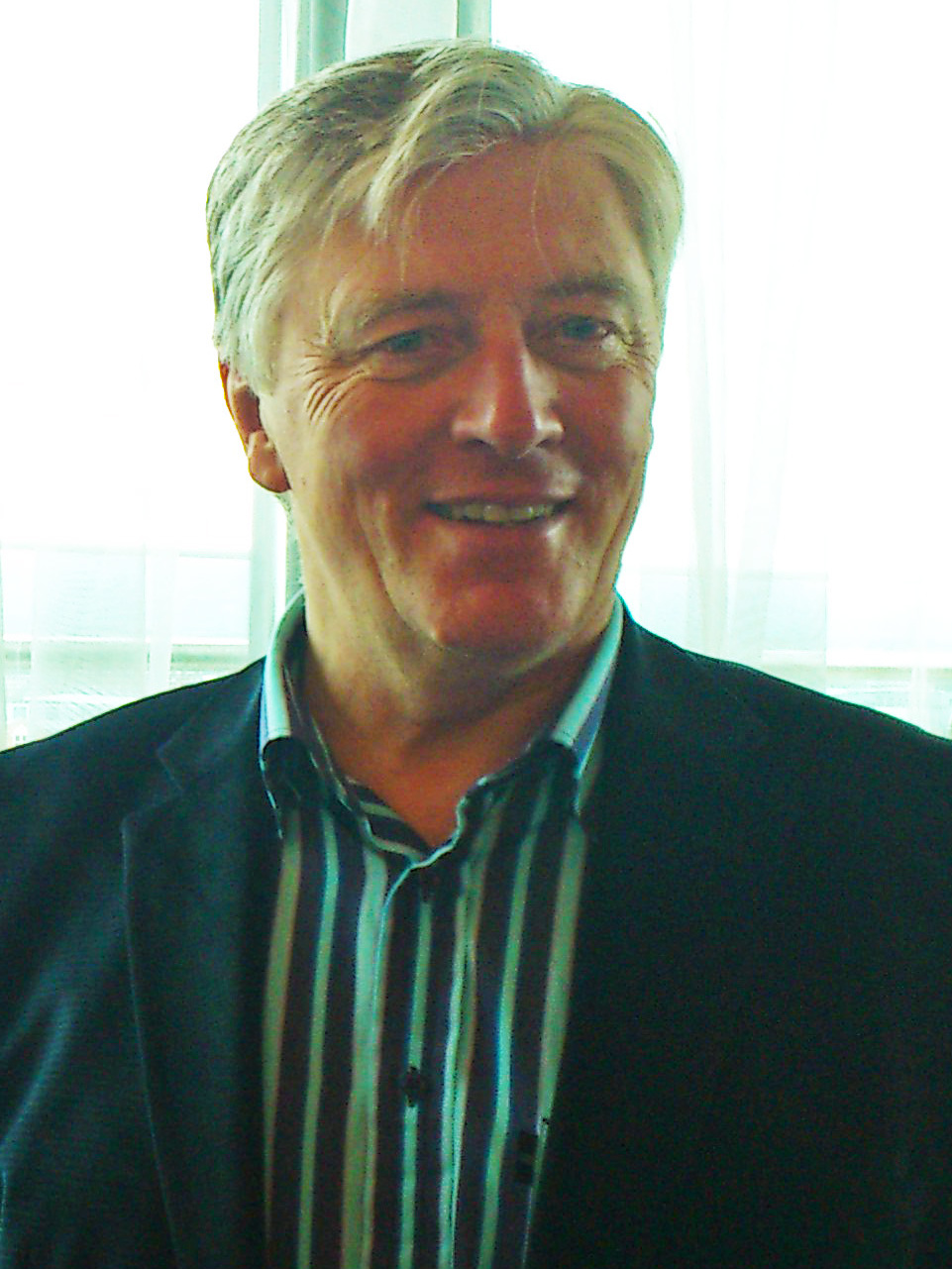
Pat Kenny in 2011

On 27 March 2009, Kenny announced live on air without warning his intention to stand down.

On 29 May 2009, an average share of 55 per cent of the total TV audience tuned in to watch Kenny present his last edition of The Late Late Show as regular host (he returned for one night in 2013 when his successor was unavailable). An outdoor event was set up for the occasion on the RTÉ campus. At the end of the show, Joe Duffy presented Kenny with a cake in the shape of a "10", to mark his ten years of presenting. The Edge of U2 also gave Kenny glasses and a guitar.

== 2009–2023: Ryan Tubridy ==
Logo during the Ryan Tubridy era

Including Pat Kenny for one night and Miriam O'Callaghan for two nights.

After two months of speculation, Ryan Tubridy emerged as Kenny's successor. Original host Gay Byrne gave Tubridy his blessing: "He has all the qualities required, the light deft touch together with a serious mind. I think it's a great adventure that he's setting off on". Other personalities tipped for the role had included Gerry Ryan and Miriam O'Callaghan. O'Callaghan, whom some media commentators considered favourite for the job, claimed she had turned down an offer, so as to keep her Prime Time slot and spend time with her eight children.

Tubridy presented his first programme on 4 September 2009 with a custom picked staff, a new set and house band. He emerged from behind a red curtain and walked to a wooden desk, at which he sat in the same €3,000-plus Irish designed chair as the actress Meryl Streep in the film The Devil Wears Prada. Guests on this first show included Brian Cowen, Saoirse Ronan, Brian McFadden, Joan Collins, Cherie Blair, and Niall Quinn. With an overall audience share of 62 per cent, it was the most watched — outside the annual Late Late Toy Show — since Gay Byrne's retirement in May 1999. This promising start would not last, however; audience ratings had declined by Tubridy's sixth season. Another notable occurrence in Tubridy's first season was when the show aired on Good Friday for the first time in 15 years in 2010. Later the same month (April), the show's former hosts, Gay Byrne and Pat Kenny, alongside fellow RTÉ broadcasters Joe Duffy, Dave Fanning and Brenda Donohue, joined Tubridy to discuss the sudden death of one-time host and colleague Gerry Ryan on 30 April 2010.

Tubridy's second season as host began with a notable interview with former British prime minister Tony Blair. The live interview occurred the night before a book signing at Eason's which attracted international attention when Blair was pelted with shoes and eggs and successfully evaded an attempted citizen's arrest on charges of war crimes.

On 1 February 2013, Pat Kenny returned to host that night's edition when Tubridy's father died.

In 2015, Tubridy's tone and choice of questions when interviewing Anti-Austerity Alliance TD Paul Murphy in relation to the campaign against the implementation of a water tax was much criticised. Opponents of the water tax praised Murphy on social media for what was said to have been his "restraint" during the interview. Julien Mercille, the academic and writer of The Political Economy and Media Coverage of the European Economic Crisis: The Case of Ireland, observed that "Tubridy was pretty good from the standpoint of protecting government interests. [...] He asked all the right questions to try to discredit the water charges protests and Paul Murphy".

In 2011, Tubridy announced that he hoped his time as host would be closer to Kenny's ten years than Byrne's 37, stating that Kenny made the "right tenure" as host. He hosted 14 seasons in total.

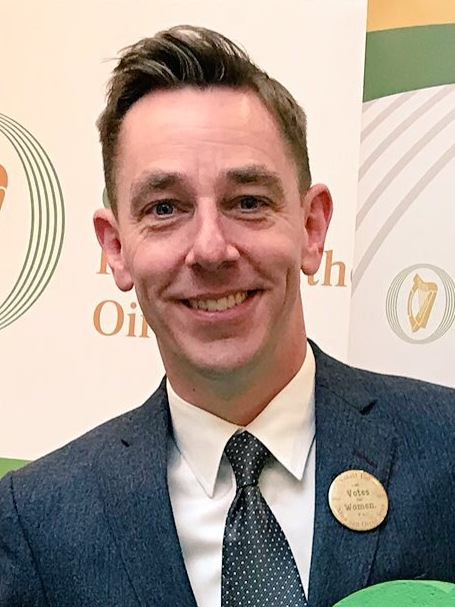
Ryan Tubridy in 2018

In March 2020, Tubridy and his production team were forced to produce the show without their usual live studio audience of around 200 who would come each week to watch the show air live from RTÉ's Studio 4. The COVID-19 pandemic caused all large gatherings of people to be banned, and so RTÉ and the Late Late Show production team decided the talk show would continue to air live every Friday night for the remainder of the season, except there would be no studio audience. The show continued to air live during the pandemic, with special guests either being interviewed via the internet or guests come into the studio and were interviewed by Tubridy whilst maintaining social distance. The first edition of the show without an audience aired on 13 March 2020, and lasted until May 2021. Studio audiences returned on 3 September 2021, initially sitting spaced out at tables in order to maintain social distancing. In May 2022, the mask mandate for audience members was lifted.

On 16 March 2023, Tubridy announced that he would be stepping down as the presenter of The Late Late Show after 14 years.

=== Tubridy's final show ===
On 26 May 2023, Tubridy presented his last edition of The Late Late Show. Messages of congratulations poured in from Saoirse Ronan, Jessie Buckley, Paul McCartney, Russell Crowe and various other celebrities. High-profile guests on this final show included Irish President Michael D. Higgins, comedian PJ Gallagher, Jedward and Charlie Bird.

There were musical performances on the night from Andrea Corr, John Sheahan, Moya Brennan, Steve Wickham, Sharon Shannon and Cian Ducrot. U2 member Bono presented Tubridy with a red Vespa scooter.

== 2023–present: Patrick Kielty ==
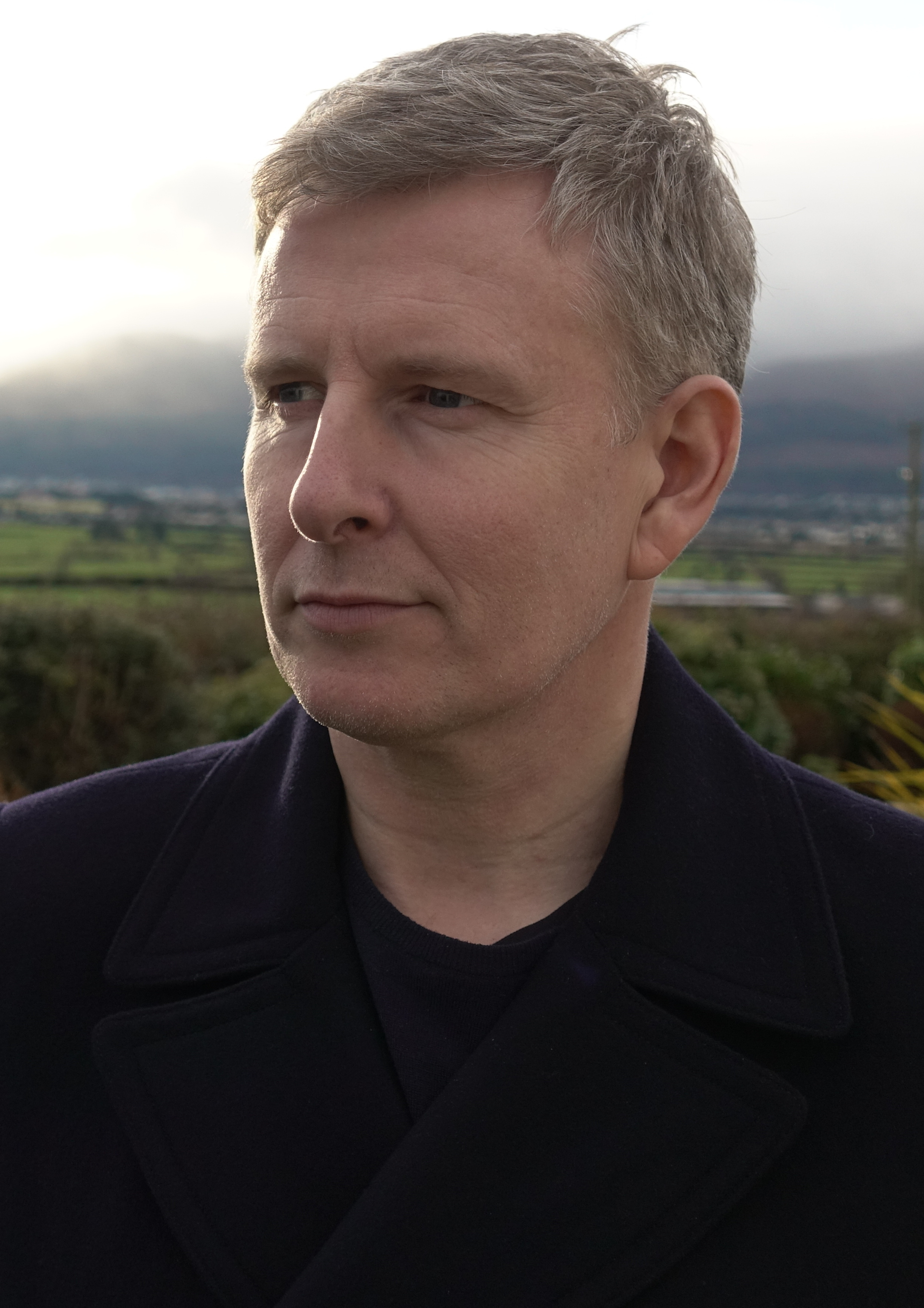
Patrick Kielty in 2017

In May 2023, after much speculation, Patrick Kielty was confirmed as Tubridy's replacement, becoming the show's fourth permanent presenter.

On 17 August 2023, it was announced that the running time for each episode of The Late Late Show would be reduced from approximately two hours to 90 minutes, although each episode would still be split into four parts, with three commercial breaks. The Toy Show, however, retained the two-hour slot. The number of episodes per season was also reduced from approximately 36 to 30.

Kielty's first show as host aired on Friday 15 September 2023. In July 2026, RTÉ confirmed Kielty's contract had been renewed until 2029.

== Hosts ==
Host	From		To		Notes
Host	Date	Age	Date	Age	Notes
Gay Byrne	6 July 1962	27	30 May 1964	29	Also simultaneously hosted Telefís Éireann's first gameshow called Jackpot
Frank Hall	19 September 1964	43	19 December 1964	43	Replacement host
Gay Byrne	2 January 1965	30	21 May 1999	64	
Pat Kenny	10 September 1999	51	29 May 2009	61	Previously hosted Kenny Live
Ryan Tubridy	4 September 2009	36	26 May 2023	49	Previously hosted Tubridy Tonight
Patrick Kielty	15 September 2023	52	Incumbent		

The Late Late Show has had four regular hosts: Gay Byrne, Pat Kenny, Ryan Tubridy and Patrick Kielty. Frank Hall deputised for Byrne for one season in the 1960s.

There have been other rare occasions on which another presenter has hosted the show. In 1972, Byrne became unexpectedly and seriously ill. Frequent panellist Ted Bonner presented in his absence. After 500 episodes of the programme in 1979, This Is Your Life host Eamonn Andrews appeared to Byrne's surprise (he had been expecting American star Dana Andrews). Andrews took over and quizzed Byrne on his seventeen years with the programme. On another occasion, radio broadcaster and former newsreader Andy O'Mahony replaced Byrne for an interview with journalist Deirdre Purcell, who had ghostwritten Byrne's autobiography.

After Kenny's mother suddenly died in October 2008, Gerry Ryan was announced as guest presenter for that week's show with less than 48 hours' notice. Kenny announced his decision to quit live on air in March 2009. On 11 May that year, RTÉ announced Ryan Tubridy as Kenny's successor. Kenny in turn replaced Tubridy on 1 February 2013 for one night only, due to the death of Tubridy's father.

A woman has only presented the Late Late Show on three occasions. On 15 November 1980, towards the end of one show about feminism, Gay Byrne ushered a young Marian Finucane into his seat to present part of an episode. In March and April 2020, Miriam O'Callaghan stood in for Ryan Tubridy on two consecutive weeks when Tubridy was quarantined with suspected symptoms of COVID-19 and later tested COVID-19 positive.

== Toy Show ==
Since the early 1970s, an annual Christmas edition entitled The Late Late Toy Show has been held in late November or early December, where various children's toys are showcased to the audience before the Christmas season.

== Music ==
=== Theme music and opening titles ===
Although not the original theme, the theme music most associated with the show is the instrumental introduction from Chris Andrews' 1965 single "To Whom It Concerns", which was in use as early as 1971 and used until Byrne's final show. The version used on the show was proceeded with a distinctive drum roll, followed by a whistle which would then segue into "To Whom It Concerns". This was always accompanied by the spoken introduction: "Ladies and gentlemen, to whom it concerns, it's "The Late Late Show", and here is your host, Gay Byrne". During the same era, a clip from '"The Late Late Show" by Nat King Cole was used as the closing music. The Late Late Show was unusual during Byrne's era in that the show's production credits ran over the opening title sequence, and only a brief still of the show's logo was shown at the end.

During the Kenny era, "To Whom It Concerns" was replaced, although the new theme incorporated elements of the distinctive drum roll from the old theme. Three different arrangements were used during this era. The show's production credits were moved to the end at this point, and the closing theme has been the same as the opening since 1999.

A new set and title sequence was introduced for Ryan Tubridy's first show, with Chris Andrews' "To Whom It Concerns" returning as the theme music after a ten-year absence, albeit in a new arrangement performed by The Late Late Show Band and RTÉ Concert Orchestra.

=== First musical performances ===
Below is a list of artists whose first televised performance happened on The Late Late Show.

Artist	Song	Date
The Boomtown Rats	"Mary of the Fourth Form"	1977
Boyzone (Note: Boyzone also made their first TV appearance since the death of Stephen Gately on 12 March 2010.)		26 November 1993
Mary Coughlan		1985
Crystal Swing	"He Drinks Tequila"	12 March 2010
Hothouse Flowers		
Sinéad O'Connor	"Mandinka"	26 February 1988
U2	"Stories for Boys"	January 1980
Finbar Wright		
The Strypes	"I Saw Her Standing There"	2010 (Toy Show)
HomeTown	"Roar"	30 May 2014
Westlife (Then known as Westside)	"Flying Without Wings"	13 November 1998
Wonderland	"When the Stars Go Blue"	26 December 2008

=== Other notable musical performances ===
Virgin Prunes, "Theme for Thought", 1979.

Therapy?, invited to perform in 1994, were anticipated to perform their cover version of the Joy Division composition "Isolation"; disheartened with their treatment, however, they decided to perform their own composition "Knives" instead, without prior notice. The performance featured two instances of the expletive "fuck", a word normally expected to be omitted. The nation was affronted. Therapy? returned the following year to perform another of their compositions, this one titled "Stories".

In 1995, the English independent rock band Pop Will Eat Itself defaced the studio whilst in the midst of a performance. The group were invited back to Ireland by Byrne having performed in the country again.

Tammy Wynette and Ray Lynam duet on 22 March 1991 of "Til a Tear Becomes a Rose".

== Eurovision Song Contest ==
The Irish representative for the Eurovision Song Contest has been chosen annually through a variety of shows including a national song competition called Eurosong and a reality TV series called You're a Star. The six finalists perform their songs live on the show, with voting done as a 50–50 split between regional juries and a public televote. The show also includes celebrity interviews, guest performances, and a panel of Eurovision experts who discuss the performances with the host.

Pat Kenny hosted numerous editions of the Eurosong final (which often replaced his Saturday Night chat show Kenny Live) and in 1988 he co-hosted the Eurovision Song Contest. In 2006 and 2007, the song was chosen on The Late Late Show, the performers Brian Kennedy and Dervish had already been chosen to represent the country at the contest. In 2008, RTÉ returned to the national song contest format for Eurosong. 2009 would be the last edition of the format that Pat Kenny would host and The Late Late Show would host the competition until 2015. Eurosong returned in 2022, hosted by Ryan Tubridy, with 2023 being Tubridy's last Eurosong. The format continued into its third consecutive year in 2024, hosted by Patrick Kielty. In December 2025, RTÉ announced that it will not participate in the Eurovision Song Contest in 2026 in protest over Israel's participation in the contest for 2026. It is unknown if the format will return should Ireland return to a future Eurovision Song Contest.

== Accolades ==
The Late Late Show was named "Favourite Irish TV Show" at the TV Now Awards on 22 May 2010.
