= Pat Kenny =

Irish television and radio presenter (born 1949)

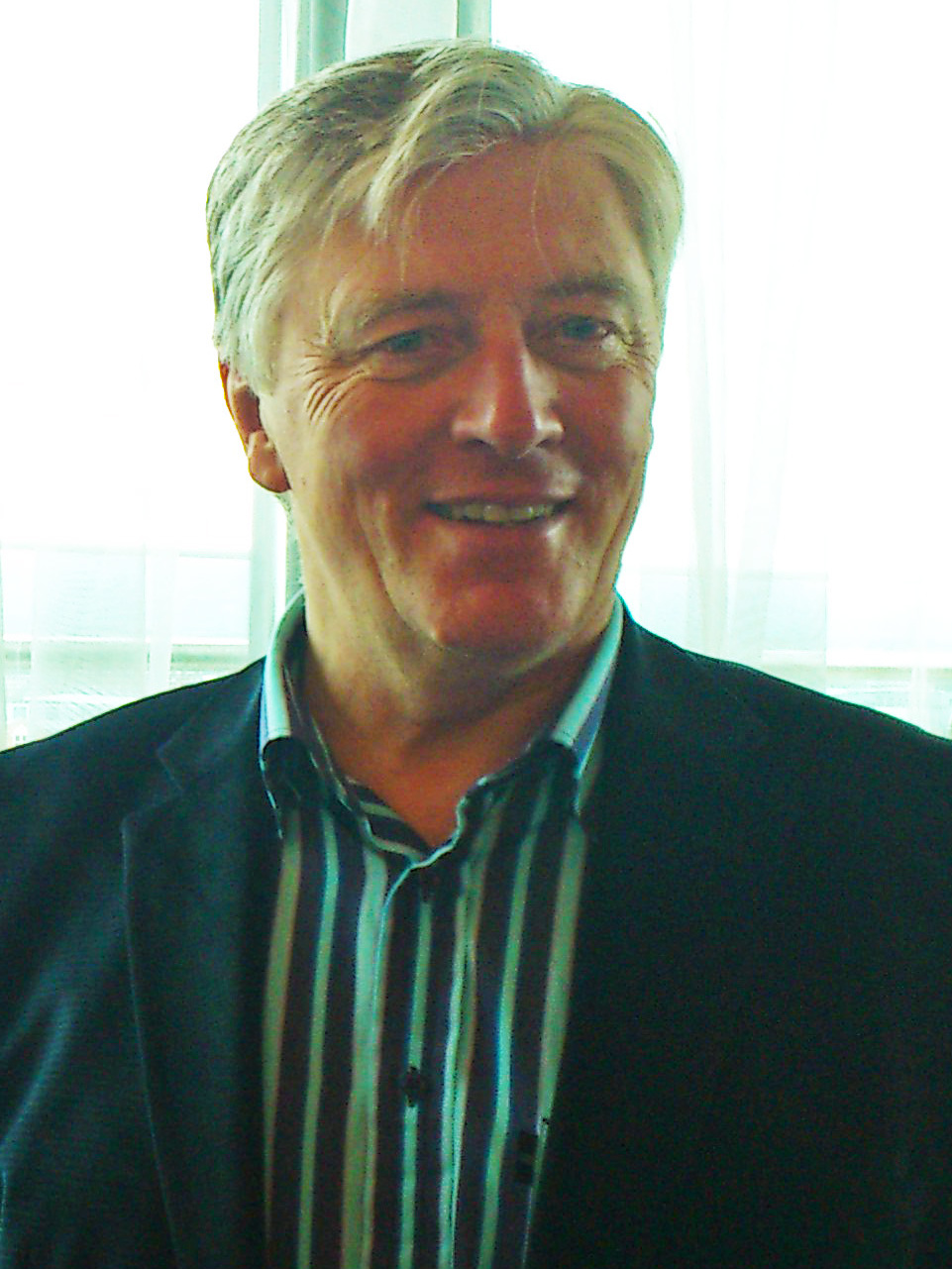
- Kenny in 2011
- Born: Patrick Kenny; 29 January 1948 (age 78); Dublin, Ireland
- Education: University College Dublin; Georgia Institute of Technology
- Occupation: Broadcaster
- Employer: Newstalk
- Known for: Today Tonight; Kenny Live; The Late Late Show; Today with Pat Kenny; The Frontline; The Pat Kenny Show; Pat Kenny Tonight; Eurovision Song Contest 1988
- Spouse: Kathy
- Children: 3
- Website: The Pat Kenny Show

Patrick Kenny (born 29 January 1948) is an Irish broadcaster, who currently hosts the daily radio show The Pat Kenny Show on Newstalk.

Prior to this, Kenny had a 41-year high-profile career at RTÉ, in which he was their highest paid presenter for several years. He presented radio show Today with Pat Kenny on RTÉ Radio 1 each weekday morning between 10:00 and midday until 2013. He hosted The Late Late Show from September 1999 until May 2009, then returned as a stand-in host in January 2013. He presented the current affairs programme The Frontline, each Monday night from 2009 until 2013.

He was the co-host of Eurovision Song Contest 1988, as well as numerous other television shows, including Today Tonight, Saturday Live and Kenny Live, and has worked for both RTÉ Radio 1 and RTÉ 2fm, sometimes simultaneously, in a career that has spanned five decades. He is the holder of a Jacob's Award and was named 23rd most influential person of 2009 by the magazine Village.

== Early career ==
Kenny was educated at the O'Connell School and obtained a chemical engineering degree from University College Dublin (UCD) in 1969. Subsequently, he was a postgraduate student at Georgia Institute of Technology and then a lecturer at Bolton Street College of Technology in Dublin. He began his broadcasting career in parallel to his academic "day-job" by working as a continuity announcer on RTÉ radio in the mid-1970s. He subsequently became a radio disc jockey.

In 1986, Kenny won a Jacob's Award for his "unusual versatility" in presenting three diverse radio shows: Saturday View on RTÉ Radio 1, and, on RTÉ 2fm, The Kenny Report and The Outside Track.

== Television career ==
=== Today Tonight, Eurovision, The Pat Kenny Show, Saturday Live, Kenny Live! ===
Kenny became a television broadcaster on RTÉ's Today Tonight, a current affairs programme in the mid-1980s. He moved in an unexpected direction for a current affairs presenter when he filled the role of co-presenter of the 1988 Eurovision Song Contest. This he did alongside Michelle Rocca at the Royal Dublin Society's Simmonscourt Pavilion. Kenny continued to be associated with Eurovision, providing television commentary for Irish viewers of the event on nine occasions from 1991 to 1999. He was criticised for referring on-air to the transsexual Israeli singer Dana International as "he, she or it" during the 1998 edition of the contest and later refused to apologise for the remark.

He presented The Pat Kenny Show. Subsequently, he had a guest slot on the weekly chat show Saturday Live. He went on to host the show permanently and its title was changed to Kenny Live!. There was a much publicised rivalry between Kenny Live!, broadcast on Saturday nights and The Late Late Show, broadcast on Friday nights. Saturday Live, latterly Kenny Live!, had been conceived as preserving the weekend slot on a Saturday night to prevent loss of viewers and corresponding loss of advertising revenue.

=== The Late Late Show (1999–2009) ===
Gay Byrne retired from presenting The Late Late Show in 1999. Kenny was announced as Byrne's replacement on 24 May 1999. He was in Israel for the 1999 Eurovision Song Contest when the announcement was made that he was taking over at the age of 51. Kenny became the new host, but not without criticism of his style during his tenure; Sunday Independent columnist Eilis O'Hanlon expressed this sentiment in 2006, writing:

"In the same way that Gay Byrne's Late Late can now be seen, looking back, as a reflection of the man's character, then Pat's Late Late is a reflection of his. And that's the problem. The switches from light to dark and back again are now handled too clunkily to convince; the exaggerated mateyness with the audience is cringemaking, making Pat look like the class geek who's too desperate to be seen as one of the lads. At the same time, he can never quite let go of that urge in him that we know how smart he is."

Among the highlights of Kenny's career in presenting The Late Late Show was his Toy Show interview with comedian Jerry Seinfeld. Seinfeld remained tight-lipped, even as Pat Kenny referred to him as Jerry Sein-field. Kenny also came under fire after an interview on The Late Late Show with Babyshambles' lead singer Pete Doherty. Kenny repeatedly questioned Doherty over his much talked about drug habits, with Doherty appearing visibly uncomfortable. Doherty, obviously annoyed, stated that Kenny had asked him "about 12" questions about drugs and Kate Moss, but nothing about his music; "I don't know if you could even name a song that I've written", Doherty quipped at one point. "Possibly not", Kenny replied.

On 27 March 2009, Kenny announced that he would resign as host of The Late Late Show at the end of the season. Guests on his final night included U2, who presented Kenny with a rare Gibson guitar and a pair of shades. During the final programme, which included an outside party, Kenny thanked the crew for their work during his ten-year reign as host.

=== The Frontline and Prime Time (2009–2013) ===
In September 2009, Kenny began presenting The Frontline every Monday night on RTÉ One, a topical debate show revolving around the interaction between Kenny, his guests and an invited audience. On 19 July 2012, Kenny appeared as host of Prime Time, the current affairs programme which replaced Kenny's pre-Late Late Show programme, Today Tonight. The Evening Herald called this " a surprise return to a familiar slot... It was a return to his roots for Mr Kenny who made his name as a current affairs broadcaster". The Frontline ended in January 2013 as Kenny became the co-host with long-time main presenter Miriam O'Callaghan of a revamped Prime Time in February 2013 until he departed RTÉ on 31 July 2013.

=== On-air attacks and interruptions ===
Kenny has sustained several on-air personal attacks during his career as presenter of The Late Late Show and The Frontline. These include:

- In November 2006, Paul Stokes, an intruder on the set of The Late Late Show, confronted Kenny live on air calling the show host and his predecessor Gay Byrne "insufferable arseholes". Eight days later Stokes rammed his car into the entrance of RTÉ's television centre and was subsequently charged with harassment after daubing walls near Kenny's home with threatening messages.
- During an interview with SIPTU general president Jack O'Connor on The Frontline on 2 November 2009, O'Connor suggested that a "reasonable level of tax" should be levied on "trophy houses". When asked to define the term "trophy house", O'Connor replied: "A house like yours, probably", to which Kenny replied, "I built my house in 1988. How is it a 'trophy house'? I don't want this crap coming at me!" O'Connor apologised a few moments later.
- During an interview with Minister for Social and Family Affairs Mary Hanafin on The Frontline on 9 November 2009, an audience member berated Kenny over the issue of an excessive wage. He compared Kenny's wage to that of the President of the United States for 11 hours of broadcast per working week. He alleged that Kenny had no right to pontificate about social welfare, or people who had no means. When Kenny attempted to resume, he was repeatedly interrupted by the audience member who continued to shout. The attack lasted for several minutes before a commercial break was taken.

=== Departure from RTÉ ===
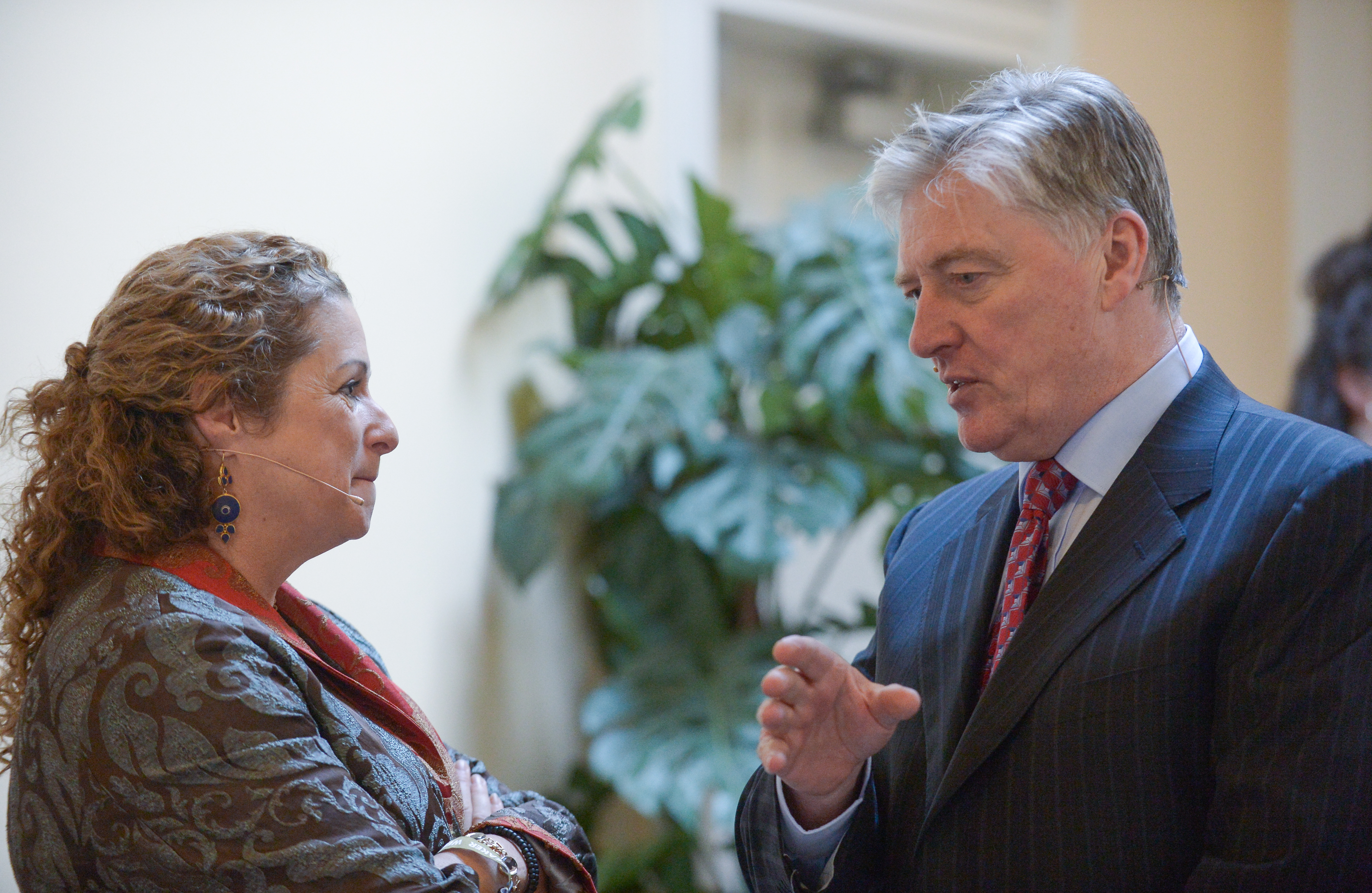
Kenny at the 2014 Dublin Web Summit.

On 31 July 2013, it was announced that Kenny would not be renewing his contract with RTÉ after a 41-year presence there, and would be leaving RTÉ to join radio station Newstalk to host a current affairs magazine show on weekdays from 10 am to 12.30 pm, starting on 2 September 2013. It caused some surprise in RTÉ. RTÉ presenters said the defection of Pat Kenny to rivals Newstalk was a "major loss" for the national broadcaster. Gay Byrne described his decision as a great loss for RTÉ; Miriam O'Callaghan said she has learnt greatly from Kenny; saying that he "... is an incredibly talented broadcaster and has shown all of us current affairs presenters how it is done."

In 2015, after 12 years, Kenny left the weekday programme for a weekend programme.

=== Return to television ===
It was announced in August 2014 that Kenny would return to TV screens in 2015 on UTV Ireland with a new show titled Pat Kenny in the Round, recorded in the Round Room in the Mansion House in Dublin. However the show was axed in September 2015.

In 2016, Kenny joined TV3 to host the current affairs show Pat Kenny Tonight along with Colette Fitzpatrick. Later the series was hosted just by Pat Kenny. A new series Pat Kenny's Big Debate was launched and in 2021 it was announced that Pat Kenny was no longer working with Virgin Media TV.

== Politics and Activism ==
Kenny supported Miriam O'Callaghan when she came under fire from Sinn Féin for challenging Martin McGuinness of his past misdeeds during the 2011 presidential election campaign in a Prime Time debate, saying "I wouldn't criticise Miriam for doing what she did". Kenny was also critical of Seán Gallagher after the presidential candidate objected to a tweet Kenny read out on The Frontline days before the 2011 election. Kenny told Gallagher to get over Tweetgate and get back to what he was "supposed to be good at"—creating jobs, and said he was "judged by the public not to be worthy."

In 2018, Kenny lent his support to a Health Service Executive campaign to educate the public on harm reduction concerning cocaine. While using his radio slot to read out practical advice regarding drug use, Kenny also warned listeners that cocaine "lines the pockets of criminals", despite a perception of the drug as "party central".

Kenny has spoken out against Ireland's historic censoring of Provisional IRA figures in broadcast media, describing the practice as "unsuccessful". He cites both American politician John F. Kennedy and actor Paul Newman as personal heroes. As a child, Kenny witnessed Kennedy in the flesh during the President's 1963 state visit to Ireland, later describing Kennedy as "the epitome of power and charisma" who "was iconic even before he was killed."

He has been a vocal critic of European Commission President Ursula von der Leyen's efforts to promote gender equality at the top of European politics. Speaking in August 2020, Kenny commented: "I know she [President von der Leyen] wants gender balance in the Commission, but it should be: Can you nominate two talented people, and I don't care what gender they are, as long as they can do the job. The idea that you get two people of one gender who are really fabulous, and it would be a toss-up between them, but you have to discard one of them and pick someone of the other gender in order to be politically correct, it doesn't seem right to me."

== Earnings ==
Kenny was the highest-paid presenter on RTÉ in 2008 earning €950,956. His pay was reduced to €729,604 in 2009 due to the economic climate. Director General of RTÉ Cathal Goan, commenting on the salaries paid to the top stars, said: "There's no question that by today's standard, they were excessive. I have to repeat that they were set at a different time in a different competitive reality where some of this talent might be up for poaching by other organisations and in RTÉ’s view at the time, they delivered value for money". Kenny issued the following statement: "I am satisfied that the significant reduction in the fees paid to my company takes account of current economic circumstances while also reflecting my experience over 37 years in broadcasting at RTÉ". His high salary was strongly denounced on live television, while Kenny was hosting. He was not technically a member of RTÉ staff but was paid through a separate company, enabling Kenny and RTÉ to reduce the amount of tax paid on his salary.

Kenny has defended himself by saying he was working harder than ever, that "I've done my bit" and that he would never "put a gun to RTE's head".

In March 2013, it was revealed he had earned €630,000 in 2011. Pat Kenny Media Services Limited, the private company of which Kenny and his wife are sole directors, posted accumulated profits of €1.52 million in 2018.

== Awards ==
In September 2012, Kenny was awarded an honorary Doctor of Science degree by University College Dublin for "exceptional contributions to public service broadcasting." In 2016, he received a lifetime achievement award by the Irish Film and Television Awards (IFTA).

== Styles of Byrne and Kenny ==
Kenny's career has been extensive, having been a continuity announcer, radio disc jockey, television current affairs presenter, subsequently anchor and chat show host. His early radio career mirrored that of Byrne's. However Byrne focused always being in entertainment and never in current affairs. Byrne described himself as an entertainer first.

Initially Kenny was perceived, by a critic, as being unsuited to the field of light entertainment as this description of Kenny Live! stated: "The fact is that Pat Kenny, is unsuited to the type of showbiz knockabout which Gay Byrne is so at home with.":

Kenny has described his style:

"Do you want bland television where everything you hear reinforces your own view, or do you want to be challenged? I favour the latter. I like to challenge people. You might get angry and pick up the phone to Joe Duffy, or you might complain to the Broadcasting Complaints Commission; that's great. It means you're involved in the argument in some way".

Due to his long association with the show, Byrne in his autobiography seemed to almost have proprietarial rights, having been both producer and presenter of the show. Kenny was the subject of much media criticism for his takeover from Byrne.

In autumn 2003, The Late Late Show had a competitor in the Friday evening time slot, with the arrival of competing television chat programme, The Dunphy Show, hosted by controversial broadcaster Eamon Dunphy on RTÉ's main rival TV3. However, The Dunphy Show failed to achieve expected viewership figures and was scrapped in December 2003 after 14 episodes.

In October 2011, Gay Byrne said the idea that he and Pat were competing in some sort of rivalry was "bloody rubbish". John Bowman's history of RTÉ Television contains a quote from chief executive Vincent Finn from when Kenny asked for to be paid more money. "In many ways," Mr Finn told the RTÉ Authority, "he believes he is better than Gay Byrne." Bowman stood by this in a radio interview on Kenny's show, saying that the revelations in which Finn said Kenny "feels very strong about the Gay Byrne thing" were contained in the RTÉ Authority archives.

== Personal life ==
Kenny is married to Kathy. She has publicly defended him against the criticism he received over the amount of money he was paid by RTÉ. They live in Dalkey, Dublin, in a house built in the early 1990s on a site purchased in 1988. They have two daughters and Kenny is also the father of another child from a previous relationship, whom he sees regularly and supports financially. Kenny's family home was on Infirmary Road. Kenny's father, Jim, died in 1982, aged 74. After Kenny's mother Connie died in 2008, her burial received media coverage as it led to Kenny's non-appearance on an edition of The Late Late Show that was aired that same evening.

=== Off-screen personality ===
An RTÉ employee, who had "regular dealings" with Kenny in the 2000s, said at the time he was "really good at what he does" and "works very hard to make both his radio show and the Late Late as good as possible." Kenny was said to be "very good at doling out praise and encouragement, particularly to younger members of staff". When he was confronted live on air in 2006 by Paul Stokes, Kenny consoled Stokes' daughter—Aoife—who happened to be a researcher on the show at the time.

=== 2008 High Court case ===
In April 2008 Kenny and his neighbour went to court over the issue of who owned a nearby field. Kenny's case was that he had entitlement of 'Gorse Hill' through adverse possession sometimes known as squatters rights. During proceedings it was claimed that Kenny placed a lock on the field without telling his neighbour. It was also claimed that Kenny came at him with 'fists raised' and 'jostled' or fought with him. Kenny also claimed damages for his neighbour's assault on him. The case was settled with Kenny buying the land for an undisclosed sum and both sides paying their own costs.

=== Unauthorised advertisements ===
In February 2019 Kenny became a high-profile victim of the fake news phenomenon when it was reported that unauthorised advertisements for erectile dysfunction cures bearing the presenter's likeness had been circulated online. Taking to his Newstalk radio show, Kenny blasted the adverts as "a scam" and advised listeners not to "buy [erectile dysfunction medication] with [Kenny's] imagined recommendation".

=== Reaction to "Golfgate" ===
In the wake of the Oireachtas Golf Society scandal which engulfed Irish politics during the COVID-19 pandemic, Kenny spoke out in defence of his erstwhile RTÉ colleague and rival for the airwaves Sean O'Rourke, who was cut adrift by the national broadcaster for his actions during the scandal. Kenny, himself a keen golfer, described the reaction to O'Rourke's carousing with politicians as "ridiculous". He has criticised the general response of the Irish government to COVID-19, accusing those in power of "pandering to populists and looking over their shoulders at the publicans', farming and hoteliers' lobbies".

== See also ==
- List of Eurovision Song Contest presenters

Media offices
Preceded by (Belgium) Viktor Lazlo	Eurovision Song Contest co-presenter (with Michelle Rocca); 1988	Succeeded by (Switzerland) Jacques Deschenaux & Lolita Morena
Preceded by Jimmy Greeley and Cliona Ni Bhuachalla	Eurovision Song Contest Ireland Commentator; 1991–1999	Succeeded by Marty Whelan
